= 2016 Chicago Cubs season =

Major League Baseball season

2016 Chicago Cubs
- World Series champions National League champions National League Central champions
- League: National League
- Division: Central
- Ballpark: Wrigley Field
- City: Chicago, Illinois
- Record: 103–58–1 (.639)
- Divisional place: 1st
- Owners: Thomas S. Ricketts, Laura Ricketts, Pete Ricketts, Todd Ricketts, Joe Ricketts
- President of baseball operations: Theo Epstein
- General manager: Jed Hoyer
- Manager: Joe Maddon
- Television: WGN-TV; CSN Chicago; CSN Chicago Plus; WLS-TV; WPWR-TV (Len Kasper, Jim Deshaies)
- Radio: WSCR (AM); Chicago Cubs Radio Network (Pat Hughes, Ron Coomer, Mark Grote)
- Stats: ESPN.com; Baseball Reference

The 2016 Chicago Cubs season was the 145th season of the Chicago Cubs franchise, the 141st season in the National League and the Cubs' 101st season at Wrigley Field. The Cubs were managed by Joe Maddon in his second season as Cubs manager, and played their home games at Wrigley Field as members of the National League Central.

They began the season on April 4, 2016 at the Los Angeles Angels and finished the regular season on October 2, 2016 at the Cincinnati Reds. The Cubs finished with the best record in Major League Baseball at 103–58 (and 1 tie), and won their first National League Central title since the 2008 season, winning by 17½ games. The team also reached the 100-win mark for the first time since 1935 and won 103 total games, the most wins for the franchise since 1910. Kris Bryant won the National League Most Valuable Player, the first Cub to accomplish this feat since Sammy Sosa in 1998.

The Cubs defeated the San Francisco Giants in the NLDS and returned to the NLCS for the second year in a row, where they defeated the Los Angeles Dodgers in six games.

The Cubs defeated the Cleveland Indians in seven games in the World Series, their first appearance since the 1945 World Series and first win since the 1908 World Series. In the World Series, the Cubs came back from a three-games-to-one deficit, winning the final three games. The last time a team came back from a three-games-to-one deficit to win the World Series was the Kansas City Royals in 1985. The Cubs were also the first team to win Games 6 and 7 on the road in a World Series since the Pittsburgh Pirates did it against the Baltimore Orioles in 1979. The World Series victory put an end to the so-called Curse of the Billy Goat and the longest World Series championship drought in history.

== Previous season ==
The Cubs finished the 2015 season 97–65, in third place in the Central Division, but qualified for the playoffs for the first time since 2008 as the second wild card. They defeated the Pittsburgh Pirates in the National League Wild Card Game to advance the National League Division Series to face the St. Louis Cardinals. Facing their rival for the first time in playoff history, the Cubs defeated the Cardinals three games to one to advance to the National League Championship Series for the first time since 2003. Facing the New York Mets in the NLCS, the Cubs were swept in four games.

== Offseason ==
=== Broadcast changes ===
After just one year broadcasting on WBBM (780), the Cubs announced the move of their play-by-play to CBS Radio sister station WSCR (670) for the 2016 season, taking advantage of a contract clause allowing the move to WSCR after CBS let their rights to White Sox play-by-play lapse.

=== Transactions ===
==== November 2015 ====
November 19	Signed a major league contract with Minor league free agent RHP Andury Acevedo
November 19	RHP Ryan Cook claimed off waivers from the Boston Red Sox.
November 19	LHP Jack Leathersich claimed off waivers from New York Mets.
November 20	1B Dan Vogelbach, RHP Pierce Johnson, C Willson Contreras, and 3B Jeimer Candelario contracts selected from Tennessee Smokies. Traded 2B Frandy De La Rosa to Texas Rangers for RHP Spencer Patton.

==== December ====
December 2	RHP Ryan Cook, LHP Jack Leathersich, non-tendered by the Cubs, making them free agents.
December 4	Signed former St. Louis Cardinals RHP John Lackey.
December 8	IF Starlin Castro traded to the New York Yankees in exchange for RHP Adam Warren and a player to be named later.
December 9	Signed former Kansas City Royals 2B Ben Zobrist.
December 15	Signed former St. Louis Cardinals OF Jason Heyward.
December 17	The Yankees completed earlier trade by trading SS Brendan Ryan to the Cubs.
December 23	Released SS Brendan Ryan

==== February 2016 ====
February 23	Claimed LHP C.J. Riefenhauser off waivers from the Baltimore Orioles.
February 25	Traded OF/IF Chris Coghlan to Oakland Athletics for RHP Aaron Brooks.
February 26	Signed OF Dexter Fowler to one-year contract for $8 million.

== Regular season ==
=== Game log ===
2016 regular season game log: 103–58 (Home: 57–24; Away: 46–34)
April: 17–5 (Home: 7–2; Away: 10–3)

#	Date	Opponent	Score	Win	Loss	Save	Attendance	Record	Box/ Streak
1	April 4	@ Angels	9–0	**Arrieta** (1–0)	Richards (0–1)	—	44,020	1–0	W1
2	April 5	@ Angels	6–1	**Lester** (1–0)	Heaney (0–1)	—	37,042	2–0	W2
3	April 7	@ D-backs	14–6	**Lackey** (1–0)	De La Rosa (0–1)	—	24,656	3–0	W3
4	April 8	@ D-backs	2–3	Ziegler (1–0)	**Cahill** (0–1)	—	27,539	3–1	L1
5	April 9	@ D-backs	4–2	**Hendricks** (1–0)	Greinke (0–2)	**Rondón** (1)	32,185	4–1	W1
6	April 10	@ D-backs	7–3	**Arrieta** (2–0)	Miller (0–1)	—	33,258	5–1	W2
7	April 11	Reds	5–3	**Warren** (1–0)	Cingrani (0–1)	**Rondón** (2)	40,882	6–1	W3
8	April 13	Reds	9–2	**Lackey** (2–0)	Simón (0–1)	—	36,496	7–1	W4
9	April 14	Reds	8–1	**Hammel** (1–0)	Iglesias (1–1)	—	34,898	8–1	W5
10	April 15	Rockies	1–6	Bettis (2–0)	**Hendricks** (1–1)	—	34,437	8–2	L1
11	April 16	Rockies	6–2	**Arrieta** (3–0)	Bergman (0–2)	—	41,702	9–2	W1
12	April 17	Rockies	0–2	Chatwood (2–1)	**Lester** (1–1)	McGee (3)	41,678	9–3	L1
13	April 18	@ Cardinals	5–0	**Lackey** (3–0)	Leake (0–2)	—	45,432	10–3	W1
14	April 19	@ Cardinals	2–1	**Hammel** (2–0)	Garcia (1–1)	**Rondón** (3)	43,841	11–3	W2
15	April 20	@ Cardinals	3–5	Martínez (3—0)	**Hendricks** (1–2)	Rosenthal (4)	43,093	11–4	L1
16	April 21	@ Reds	16–0	**Arrieta** (4–0)	Finnegan (1–1)	—	16,497	12–4	W1
17	April 22	@ Reds	8–1	**Lester** (2–1)	Moscot (0–1)	—	25,940	13–4	W2
18	April 23	@ Reds	5–13	Wood (2–0)	**Lackey** (3–1)	—	41,660	13–5	L1
19	April 24	@ Reds	9–0	**Hammel** (3–0)	Simón (0–2)	—	36,220	14–5	W1
20	April 26	Brewers	4–3	**Warren** (2–0)	Nelson (3–2)	**Rondón** (4)	35,861	15–5	W2
—	April 27	Brewers	**Postponed (rain)** (Makeup date: August 16)						
21	April 28	Brewers	7–2	**Arrieta** (5–0)	Jungmann (0–4)	—	32,734	16–5	W3
22	April 29	Braves	6–1	**Strop** (1–0)	Johnson (0–3)	—	34,007	17–5	W4
—	April 30	Braves	**Postponed (rain)** (Makeup date: July 7)						

May: 18–10 (Home: 11–5; Away: 7–5)

#	Date	Opponent	Score	Win	Loss	Save	Attendance	Record	Streak
23	May 1	Braves	3–4 (10)	Vizcaino (1–0)	**Rondón** (0–1)	Grilli (2)	40,164	17–6	L1
24	May 2	@ Pirates	7–2	**Hammel** (4–0)	Cole (2–3)	—	18,376	18–6	W1
25	May 3	@ Pirates	7–1	**Arrieta** (6–0)	Niese (3–1)	—	22,195	19–6	W2
26	May 4	@ Pirates	6–2	**Lester** (3–1)	Nicasio (3–3)	—	28,782	20–6	W3
27	May 5	Nationals	5–2	**Hendricks** (2–2)	Ross (3–1)	—	37,564	21–6	W4
28	May 6	Nationals	8–6	**Lackey** (4–1)	Scherzer (3–2)	**Rondón** (5)	39,206	22–6	W5
29	May 7	Nationals	8–5	**Warren** (3–0)	Solis (0–1)	**Rondón** (6)	40,471	23–6	W6
30	May 8	Nationals	4–3 (13)	**Wood** (1–0)	Treinen (2–1)	—	41,233	24–6	W7
—	May 9	Padres	**Postponed (rain)** (Makeup date: May 11)						
31	May 10	Padres	8–7	**Lester** (4–1)	Vargas (0–2)	**Rondón** (7)	34,860	25–6	W8
32	May 11	Padres	4–7	Villanueva (1–0)	**Strop** (1–1)	Rodney (9)	34,508	25–7	L1
33	May 11	Padres	0–1	Pomeranz (4–3)	**Lackey** (4–2)	Rodney (10)	37,828	25–8	L2
34	May 13	Pirates	9–4	**Hammel** (5–0)	Liriano (3–2)	—	37,479	26–8	W1
35	May 14	Pirates	8–2	**Arrieta** (7–0)	Locke (1–3)	—	40,953	27–8	W2
36	May 15	Pirates	1–2	Cole (4–3)	**Lester** (4–2)	Melancon (11)	40,814	27–9	L1
37	May 17	@ Brewers	2–4	Anderson (2–5)	**Hendricks** (2–3)	Jeffress (11)	24,361	27–10	L2
38	May 18	@ Brewers	2–1 (13)	**Wood** (2–0)	Torres (0–1)	**Richard** (1)	31,212	28–10	W1
39	May 19	@ Brewers	3–5	Guerra (3–0)	**Hammel** (5–1)	Thornburg (1)	38,781	28–11	L1
40	May 20	@ Giants	8–1	**Arrieta** (8–0)	Peavy (1–5)	—	41,750	29–11	W1
41	May 21	@ Giants	3–5	Cain (1–5)	**Lester** (4–3)	Casilla (11)	41,507	29–12	L1
42	May 22	@ Giants	0–1	Bumgarner (6–2)	**Hendricks** (2–4)	Casilla (12)	41,359	29–13	L2
43	May 23	@ Cardinals	3–4	Rosenthal (2–1)	**Warren** (3–1)	—	45,008	29–14	L3
44	May 24	@ Cardinals	12–3	**Hammel** (6–1)	Wacha (2–5)	—	44,588	30–14	W1
45	May 25	@ Cardinals	9–8	**Arrieta** (9–0)	Martinez (4–5)	**Rondón** (8)	45,565	31–14	W2
46	May 27	Phillies	6–2	**Lester** (5–3)	Morgan (1–3)	—	38,941	32–14	W3
47	May 28	Phillies	4–1	**Hendricks** (3–4)	Eickhoff (2–7)	—	41,555	33–14	W4
48	May 29	Phillies	7–2	**Lackey** (5–2)	Velasquez (5–2)	—	41,575	34–14	W5
49	May 30	Dodgers	2–0	**Wood** (3–0)	Wood (1–4)	**Rondón** (9)	41,470	35–14	W6
50	May 31	Dodgers	0–5	Blanton (3–2)	**Richard** (0–1)	—	34,681	35–15	L1

June: 16–12 (Home: 7–4; Away: 9–8)

#	Date	Opponent	Score	Win	Loss	Save	Attendance	Record	Streak
51	June 1	Dodgers	2–1	**Lester** (6–3)	Bolsinger (1–2)	—	36,426	36–15	W1
52	June 2	Dodgers	7–2	**Hendricks** (4–4)	Urias (0–1)	—	37,422	37–15	W2
53	June 3	D-backs	6–0	**Lackey** (6–2)	Bradley (2–1)	—	38,813	38–15	W3
54	June 4	D-backs	5–3	**Hammel** (7–1)	Escobar (0–2)	**Rondón** (10)	40,415	39–15	W4
55	June 5	D-backs	2–3	Corbin (3–5)	**Arrieta** (9–1)	Ziegler (11)	41,596	39–16	L1
56	June 6	@ Phillies	6–4	**Lester** (7–3)	Morgan (1–5)	**Rondón** (11)	22,162	40–16	W1
57	June 7	@ Phillies	2–3	Eickhoff (3–8)	**Hendricks** (4–5)	Gómez (19)	27,381	40–17	L1
58	June 8	@ Phillies	8–1	**Lackey** (7–2)	Oberholtzer (2–1)	—	28,650	41–17	W1
59	June 10	@ Braves	1–5	Norris (2–7)	**Hammel** (7–2)	—	30,547	41–18	L1
60	June 11	@ Braves	8–2	**Arrieta** (10–1)	Wisler (2–7)	—	43,114	42–18	W1
61	June 12	@ Braves	13–2	**Lester** (8–3)	Gant (0–1)	—	31,625	43–18	W2
62	June 13	@ Nationals	1–4	Scherzer (8–4)	**Hendricks** (4–6)	Kelley (1)	37,187	43–19	L1
63	June 14	@ Nationals	4–3	**Rondón** (1–1)	Solis (1–2)	—	41,955	44–19	W1
64	June 15	@ Nationals	4–5 (12)	Petit (2–0)	**Cahill** (0–2)	—	42,000	44–20	L1
65	June 17	Pirates	6–0	**Arrieta** (11–1)	Liriano (4–7)	—	41,547	45–20	W1
66	June 18	Pirates	4–3	**Lester** (9–3)	Niese (6–4)	**Rondón** (12)	41,424	46–20	W2
67	June 19	Pirates	10–5	**Hendricks** (5–6)	Taillon (1–1)	—	41,024	47–20	W3
68	June 20	Cardinals	2–3	García (5–6)	**Lackey** (7–3)	Rosenthal (13)	41,166	47–21	L1
69	June 21	Cardinals	3–4	Wainwright (6–4)	**Hammel** (7–3)	Rosenthal (14)	41,616	47–22	L2
70	June 22	Cardinals	2–7	Wacha (3–7)	**Arrieta** (11–2)	—	41,058	47–23	L3
71	June 23	@ Marlins	2–4	Barraclough (4–2)	**Strop** (1–2)	Phelps (3)	25,291	47–24	L4
72	June 24	@ Marlins	5–4	**Cahill** (1–2)	Dunn (0–1)	**Rondón** (13)	24,385	48–24	W1
73	June 25	@ Marlins	6–9	Clemens (1–0)	**Lackey** (7–4)	Ramos (24)	29,457	48–25	L1
74	June 26	@ Marlins	1–6	Fernández (10–3)	**Hammel** (7–4)	—	27,318	48–26	L2
75	June 27	@ Reds	11–8	**Arrieta** (12–2)	Straily (4–5)	—	31,762	49–26	W1
76	June 28	@ Reds	7–2 (15)	**Patton** (1–0)	Hoover (1–2)	—	35,999	50–26	W2
77	June 29	@ Reds	9–2	**Hendricks** (6–6)	Reed (0–2)	—	37,188	51–26	W3
78	June 30	@ Mets	3–4	Goeddel (1–0)	**Peralta** (1–1)	Familia (27)	40,122	51–27	L1

July: 12–14 (Home: 9–6; Away: 3–8)

#	Date	Opponent	Score	Win	Loss	Save	Attendance	Record	Streak
79	July 1	@ Mets	2–10	deGrom (4–4)	**Hammel** (7–5)	—	34,294	51–28	L2
80	July 2	@ Mets	3–4	Colón (7–4)	**Arrieta** (12–3)	Familia (28)	41,151	51–29	L3
81	July 3	@ Mets	3–14	Syndergaard (9–3)	**Lester** (9–4)	—	36,137	51–30	L4
82	July 4	Reds	10–4	**Hendricks** (7–6)	Reed (0–3)	—	41,293	52–30	W1
83	July 5	Reds	5–9	Finnegan (4–7)	**Lackey** (7–5)	—	41,310	52–31	L1
84	July 6	Reds	3–5	DeSclafani (3–0)	**Cahill** (1–3)	Cingrani (10)	41,262	52–32	L2
85	July 7	Braves	3–4 (11)	Alvarez (3–1)	**Patton** (1–1)	Cabrera (2)	41,480	52–33	L3
86	July 8	@ Pirates	4–8	Feliz (3–0)	**Arrieta** (12–4)	Melancon (27)	35,904	52–34	L4
87	July 9	@ Pirates	6–12	Caminero (1–2)	**Warren** (3–2)	Hughes (1)	37,796	52–35	L5
88	July 10	@ Pirates	6–5	**Strop** (2–2)	Watson (1–3)	**Rondón** (14)	37,998	53–35	W1
**87th All-Star Game in San Diego, California**
89	July 15	Rangers	6–0	**Hendricks** (8–6)	Pérez (7–6)	—	41,482	54–35	W2
90	July 16	Rangers	3–1	**Hammel** (8–5)	Darvish (2–1)	**Rondón** (15)	41,346	55–35	W3
91	July 17	Rangers	1–4	Hamels (10–2)	**Lackey** (7–6)	Dyson (19)	41,213	55–36	L1
92	July 18	Mets	5–1	**Lester** (10–4)	Matz (7–6)	**Rondón** (16)	41,353	56–36	W1
93	July 19	Mets	1–2	Robles (4–3)	**Rondón** (1–2)	Familia (33)	41,456	56–37	L1
94	July 20	Mets	6–2	**Hendricks** (9–6)	Colón (8–5)	—	41,210	57–37	W1
95	July 22	@ Brewers	5–2	**Hammel** (9–5)	Nelson (6–8)	**Rondón** (17)	42,243	58–37	W2
96	July 23	@ Brewers	1–6	Davies (7–4)	**Lackey** (7–7)	—	44,643	58–38	L1
97	July 24	@ Brewers	6–5	**Nathan** (1–0)	Smith (1–3)	**Rondón** (18)	43,310	59–38	W1
98	July 25	@ White Sox	4–5	Jennings (4–2)	**Montgomery** (3–5)	—	39,510	59–39	L1
99	July 26	@ White Sox	0–3	Shields (5–12)	**Hendricks** (9–7)	Robertson (24)	39,553	59–40	L2
100	July 27	White Sox	8–1	**Hammel** (10–5)	Ranaudo (1–1)	—	41,166	60–40	W1
101	July 28	White Sox	3–1	**Lackey** (8–7)	Sale (14–4)	**Chapman** (21)	41,157	61–40	W2
102	July 29	Mariners	12–1	**Lester** (11–4)	Iwakuma (11–7)	—	40,951	62–40	W3
103	July 30	Mariners	1–4	Miley (7–8)	**Arrieta** (12–5)	Cishek (25)	41,401	62–41	L1
104	July 31	Mariners	7–6 (12)	**Rondón** (2–2)	Martin (1–1)	—	40,952	63–41	W1

August: 22–6 (Home: 14–2; Away: 8–4)

#	Date	Opponent	Score	Win	Loss	Save	Attendance	Record	Streak
105	August 1	Marlins	5–0	**Hendricks** (10–7)	Conley (7–6)	—	40,937	64–41	W2
106	August 2	Marlins	3–2	**Hammel** (11–5)	Fernández (12–6)	**Chapman** (22)	40,416	65–41	W3
107	August 3	Marlins	5–4	**Grimm** (1–0)	Ramos (1–1)	—	41,147	66–41	W4
108	August 5	@ Athletics	7–2	**Lester** (12–4)	Overton (1–3)	—	25,182	67–41	W5
109	August 6	@ Athletics	4–0	**Arrieta** (13–5)	Gray (5–11)	—	32,358	68–41	W6
110	August 7	@ Athletics	3–1	**Hendricks** (11–7)	Manaea (3–7)	**Chapman** (23)	23,450	69–41	W7
111	August 9	Angels	5–1	**Lackey** (9–7)	Weaver (8–9)	—	41,227	70–41	W8
112	August 10	Angels	3–1	**Hammel** (12–5)	Nolasco (4–9)	**Chapman** (24)	41,015	71–41	W9
113	August 11	Cardinals	4–3 (11)	**Montgomery** (4–5)	Duke (2–1)	—	40,597	72–41	W10
114	August 12	Cardinals	13–2	**Arrieta** (14–5)	Wainwright (9–7)	—	40,848	73–41	W11
115	August 13	Cardinals	4–8	Reyes (1–0)	**Edwards Jr.** (0–1)	—	41,278	73–42	L1
116	August 14	Cardinals	4–6	Bowman (2–4)	**Rondón** (2–3)	Oh (11)	41,019	73–43	L2
117	August 16	Brewers	4–0	**Cahill** (2–3)	Garza (4–5)	**Chapman** (25)	41,148	74–43	W1
118	August 16	Brewers	4–1	**Hammel** (13–5)	Mariñez (0–1)	**Chapman** (26)	39,420	75–43	W2
119	August 17	Brewers	6–1	**Lester** (13–4)	Nelson (6–13)	—	40,310	76–43	W3
120	August 18	Brewers	9–6	**Arrieta** (15–5)	Davies (9–6)	**Chapman** (27)	41,407	77–43	W4
121	August 19	@ Rockies	6–7	Carasiti (1–0)	**Chapman** (3–1)	—	43,950	77–44	L1
122	August 20	@ Rockies	9–2	**Cahill** (3–3)	Hoffman (0–1)	—	48,113	78–44	W1
123	August 21	@ Rockies	4–11	De La Rosa (8–7)	**Hammel** (13–6)	—	46,206	78–45	L1
124	August 22	@ Padres	5–1	**Lester** (14–4)	Jackson (3–4)	—	31,707	79–45	W1
125	August 23	@ Padres	5–3	**Arrieta** (16–5)	Friedrich (4–10)	**Chapman** (28)	33,614	80–45	W2
126	August 24	@ Padres	6–3	**Hendricks** (12–7)	Clemens (2–3)	**Chapman** (29)	30,033	81–45	W3
127	August 26	@ Dodgers	6–4 (10)	**Wood** (4–0)	Liberatore (2–1)	**Chapman** (30)	48,609	82–45	W4
128	August 27	@ Dodgers	2–3	Urías (5–2)	**Hammel** (13–7)	Jansen (38)	49,522	82–46	L1
129	August 28	@ Dodgers	0–1	Blanton (5–2)	**Cahill** (3–4)	Jansen (39)	44,745	82–47	L2
130	August 29	Pirates	8–7 (13)	**Zastryzny** (1–0)	Locke (9–8)	—	38,951	83–47	W1
131	August 30	Pirates	3–0	**Hendricks** (13–7)	Kuhl (3–2)	**Chapman** (31)	38,174	84–47	W2
132	August 31	Pirates	6–5	**Hammel** (14–7)	Vogelsong (3–4)	**Chapman** (32)	38,137	85–47	W3

September: 17–10 (Home: 9–5; Away: 8–5)

#	Date	Opponent	Score	Win	Loss	Save	Attendance	Record	Streak
133	September 1	Giants	5–4	**Smith** (2–4)	Strickland (3–2)	**Edwards Jr.** (1)	38,539	86–47	W4
134	September 2	Giants	2–1	**Lester** (15–4)	Suárez (3–3)	—	40,818	87–47	W5
135	September 3	Giants	2–3	Bumgarner (14–8)	**Arrieta** (16–6)	Casilla (30)	41,250	87–48	L1
136	September 4	Giants	3–2 (13)	**Cahill** (4–4)	Reynolds (0–1)	—	41,293	88–48	W1
137	September 5	@ Brewers	7–2	**Hendricks** (14–7)	Davies (10–7)	—	43,662	89–48	W2
138	September 6	@ Brewers	5–12	Peralta (6–9)	**Hammel** (14–8)	—	32,888	89–49	L1
139	September 7	@ Brewers	1–2	Knebel (1–2)	**Smith** (2–5)	Thornburg (9)	23,832	89–50	L2
140	September 9	@ Astros	2–0	**Lester** (16–4)	Musgrove (2–4)	**Chapman** (33)	33,841	90–50	W1
141	September 10	@ Astros	1–2	McHugh (10–10)	**Lackey** (9–8)	Giles (10)	41,854	90–51	L1
142	September 11	@ Astros	9–5	**Arrieta** (17–6)	Fiers (10–7)	—	31,939	91–51	W1
143	September 12	@ Cardinals	4–1	**Hendricks** (15–7)	Leake (9–10)	**Chapman** (34)	43,397	92–51	W2
144	September 13	@ Cardinals	2–4	Reyes (2–1)	**Hammel** (14–9)	Siegrist (2)	44,060	92–52	L1
145	September 14	@ Cardinals	7–0	**Lester** (17–4)	Martínez (14–8)	—	44,701	93–52	W1
146	September 15	Brewers	4–5	Nelson (8–14)	**Grimm** (1–1)	Thornburg (10)	41,362	93–53	L1
147	September 16	Brewers	5–4 (10)	**Chapman** (1–1)	Boyer (2–4)	—	40,823	94–53	W1
148	September 17	Brewers	3–11	Davies (11–7)	**Arrieta** (17–7)	—	40,956	94–54	L1
149	September 18	Brewers	1–3	Peralta (7–10)	**Hendricks** (15–8)	Thornburg (11)	41,286	94–55	L2
150	September 19	Reds	5–2	**Hammel** (15–9)	Wood (6–4)	**Chapman** (35)	39,251	95–55	W1
151	September 20	Reds	6–1	**Lester** (18–4)	Smith (3–2)	—	40,586	96–55	W2
152	September 21	Reds	9–2	**Lackey** (10–8)	Stephenson (2–2)	—	40,434	97–55	W3
153	September 23	Cardinals	5–0	**Arrieta** (18–7)	Leake (9–11)	—	40,791	98–55	W4
154	September 24	Cardinals	4–10	Reyes (4–1)	**Hammel** (15–10)	—	40,785	98–56	L1
155	September 25	Cardinals	3–1	**Lester** (19–4)	Martínez (15–9)	**Chapman** (36)	40,859	99–56	W1
156	September 26	@ Pirates	12–2	**Hendricks** (16–8)	Kuhl (5–4)	—	20,519	100–56	W2
157	September 27	@ Pirates	6–4	**Lackey** (11–8)	Vogelsong (3–7)	**Peña** (1)	22,454	101–56	W3
158	September 28	@ Pirates	4–8	Taillon (5–4)	**Arrieta** (18–8)	—	24,138	101–57	L1
159	September 29	@ Pirates	1–1 (6)	**Game called (inclement weather)** (game was not made up, tie does not count in record)			19,991	101–57	—
160	September 30	@ Reds	7–3	**Buchanan** (1–0)	Smith (3–3)	—	27,368	102–57	W1

October: 1–1 (Home: 0–0; Away: 1–1)

#	Date	Opponent	Score	Win	Loss	Save	Attendance	Record	Streak
161	October 1	@ Reds	4–7	Adleman (4–4)	**Lester** (19–5)	Iglesias (6)	30,970	102–58	L1
162	October 2	@ Reds	7–4	**Grimm** (2–1)	Iglesias (3–2)	**Edwards Jr.** (2)	32,587	103–58	W1

Legend: = Win = Loss = Postponement
Bold = Cubs team member

=== Season standings ===
NL Central
Team	W	L	Pct.	GB	Home	Road
Chicago Cubs	103	58	.640	—	57‍–‍24	46‍–‍34
St. Louis Cardinals	86	76	.531	17½	38‍–‍43	48‍–‍33
Pittsburgh Pirates	78	83	.484	25	38‍–‍42	40‍–‍41
Milwaukee Brewers	73	89	.451	30½	41‍–‍40	32‍–‍49
Cincinnati Reds	68	94	.420	35½	38‍–‍43	30‍–‍51

Division leaders
Team	W	L	Pct.
Chicago Cubs	103	58	.640
Washington Nationals	95	67	.586
Los Angeles Dodgers	91	71	.562

Wild Card teams (Top 2 teams qualify for postseason)
Team	W	L	Pct.	GB
New York Mets	87	75	.537	—
San Francisco Giants	87	75	.537	—
St. Louis Cardinals	86	76	.531	1
Miami Marlins	79	82	.491	7½
Pittsburgh Pirates	78	83	.484	8½
Colorado Rockies	75	87	.463	12
Milwaukee Brewers	73	89	.451	14
Philadelphia Phillies	71	91	.438	16
Arizona Diamondbacks	69	93	.426	18
Atlanta Braves	68	93	.422	18½
San Diego Padres	68	94	.420	19
Cincinnati Reds	68	94	.420	19

=== Record vs. opponents ===
2016 National League record Source: MLB Standings Grid – 2016
Team	AZ	ATL	CHC	CIN	COL	LAD	MIA	MIL	NYM	PHI	PIT	SD	SF	STL	WSH	AL
Arizona	—	5–2	2–5	3–3	10–9	7–12	2–4	3–4	5–1	4–3	1–5	10–9	6–13	4–3	2–5	5–15
Atlanta	2–5	—	3–3	3–4	1–6	1–5	11–7	2–5	10–9	11–8	3–4	4–2	3–4	2–4	4–15	8–12
Chicago	5–2	3–3	—	15–4	2–4	4–3	4–3	11–8	2–5	5–1	14–4	4–2	4–3	10–9	5–2	15–5
Cincinnati	3–3	4–3	4–15	—	5–2	2–5	3–4	11–8	0–6	4–2	9–10	3–4	3–3	9–10	3–4	5–15
Colorado	9–10	6–1	4–2	2–5	—	7–12	2–5	1–5	6–1	2–5	2–5	10–9	9–10	2–4	4–2	9–11
Los Angeles	12–7	5–1	3–4	5–2	12–7	—	1–6	5–2	4–3	4–2	2–5	11–8	8–11	4–2	5–1	10–10
Miami	4–2	7–11	3–4	4–3	5–2	6–1	—	4–2	7–12	9–10	6–1	3–3	2–4	4–3	9–10	6–14
Milwaukee	4–3	5–2	8–11	8–11	5–1	2–5	2–4	—	2–5	3–4	9–10	3–4	1–5	6–13	4–2	11–9
New York	1–5	9–10	5–2	6–0	1–6	3–4	12–7	5–2	—	12–7	3–3	4–3	4–3	3–3	7–12	12–8
Philadelphia	3–4	8–11	1–5	2–4	5–2	2–4	10–9	4–3	7–12	—	3–4	5–2	3–3	2–5	5–14	11–9
Pittsburgh	5–1	4–3	4–14	10–9	5–2	5–2	1–6	10–9	3–3	4–3	—	3–3	4–3	9–10	2–4	9–11
San Diego	9–10	2–4	2–4	4–3	9–10	8–11	3–3	4–3	3–4	2–5	3–3	—	8–11	1–6	4–3	6–14
San Francisco	13–6	4–3	3–4	3–3	10–9	11–8	4–2	5–1	3–4	3–3	3–4	11–8	—	3–4	3–4	8–12
St. Louis	3–4	4–2	9–10	10–9	4–2	2–4	3–4	13–6	3–3	5–2	10–9	6–1	4–3	—	2–5	8–12
Washington	5–2	15–4	2–5	4–3	2–4	1–5	10–9	2–4	12–7	14–5	4–2	3–4	4–3	5–2	—	12–8

=== Opening Day starters ===
Monday, April 4, 2016 at Los Angeles Angels

Name	Pos.
Dexter Fowler	CF
Jason Heyward	RF
Ben Zobrist	2B
Anthony Rizzo	1B
Kris Bryant	3B
Kyle Schwarber	LF
Jorge Soler	DH
Miguel Montero	C
Addison Russell	SS

Starting Pitcher: Jake Arrieta

=== Season summary ===
==== April ====
The Cubs won their first three games and eight of their first nine to begin the season 8–1, their best start since 1969.

- **April 4** – Dexter Fowler had three hits and Miguel Montero homered and drove in three runs as the Cubs clobbered the Angels 9–0 on Opening Day in Anaheim. Jake Arrieta pitched seven shutout innings allowing only two hits for the win.
- **April 6** – Dexter Fowler, Matt Szczur, and Anthony Rizzo all homered as the Cubs again handled the Angels, winning 6–1. Jon Lester pitched seven innings while allowing only one run in the Cub win.
- **April 7** – As the Cubs next traveled to Arizona to face the Diamondbacks, Kyle Schwarber and Dexter Fowler collided in the outfield which resulted in a torn ACL and LCL in Schwarber's left knee that would cause him to miss the remainder of the regular season. In the game, the Cubs fell behind early, but came from behind as Anthony Rizzo drove in six runs and Fowler drove in two runs as the Cubs won 14–6, their third straight win to open the season. John Lackey struggled in his first start as a Cub, giving up six runs in six innings, but the Cub bullpen shut out the D-backs for the remainder of the game to secure the win.
- **April 8** – In the second game of the series in Arizona, the Cubs took an early lead on a bases loaded walk by Jason Heyward and groundout by Ben Zobrist. Jason Hammell pitched well, allowing only one run in six innings, but four Cub relievers allowed two runs including the walk-off single by Yasmany Tomas as the Cubs fell for the first time on the season 3–2.
- **April 9** – In game three of the series, the Cubs jumped up on the D-backs early, scoring three runs in the first inning. Kyle Hendricks allowed two runs in 6.2 innings of work and Hector Rondon earned his first save of the season as the Cubs won 4–2.
- **April 10** – In the final game of the series, Jake Arrieta and Jorge Soler each homered and drove in two runs. On the mound, Arrieta scattered eight hits in seven innings of work while giving up three runs as the Cubs defeated the D-backs 7–3.
- **April 11** – The Cubs opened the season at Wrigley Field against the Cincinnati Reds, but fell behind 3–0 early. Jon Lester only lasted six innings while giving up the three runs and left trailing 3–0. However, Jason Heyward drove in two runs in the seventh to narrow the lead to 3–2 and Addison Russell hit a three-run home run in the bottom of the eight to give the Cubs the 5–3 win.
- **April 13** – After an off day, the Cubs jumped out to an early 5–1 lead in the first inning against the Reds and pushed the lead to 9–1 by the fourth inning. John Lackey allowed two runs in 6.2 innings in the 9–2 blowout.
- **April 14** – Looking to sweep the Reds, the Cubs led throughout, breaking open a 3–0 lead in the eighth inning by scoring five runs to push the lead to 8–0. The Reds managed a run in the ninth, but the Cubs moved their record to 8–1 on the season in the 8–1 win.
- **April 15** – The Colorado Rockies next visited Wrigley for a three-game series. Kyle Hendricks allowed four runs in six innings and the Cub bullpen allowed two more as the Cubs fell 6–1. The Cubs managed only four hits in the game while committing four errors.
- **April 16** – The Cubs bounced back the next day, scoring six runs on homers by Anthony Rizzo, Jorge Soler, and Dexter Fowler. Jake Arrieta pitched eight scoreless innings before Travis Wood allowed two runs to the Rockies in the ninth as the Cubs won 6–2.
- **April 17** – The Cubs were shutout by future Cub pitcher Tyler Chatwood as the Rockies beat the Cubs 2–0. Jon Lester allowed one run in 7.1 innings, but the Cub offense managed only three hits. The loss marked the first series loss on the season for the Cubs as they fell to 9–3 on the season.
- **April 18** – The Cubs next traveled to St. Louis to face the Cardinals at Busch Stadium. John Lackey pitched seven innings against his former team while striking out 11 and driving in a run. The Cub bullpen blanked the Cardinals as Dexter Fowler homered in the 5–0 win.
- **April 19** – Jason Hammel allowed only one run in six innings and drove in the only Cub runs of the game. St. Louis could manage nothing else and the Cubs won 2–1, moving to 11–3 on the season.
- **April 22** – Kyle Hendricks gave up four runs and could not make it out of the sixth as the Cardinals beat the Cubs 5–3. Anthony Rizzo homered and drove in two in the loss.
- **April 21** – The Cubs hit five homers to beat the Reds 16–0 in Cincinnati. Jake Arrieta threw a no-hitter for the second time in 11 regular season starts while Kris Bryant drove in six runs in the blowout. Anthony Rizzo and Ben Zobrist each homered and drove in three as well as the Cubs pounded out 18 hits.
- **April 22** – Jon Lester allowed five hits, but only one run in seven innings and Anthony Rizzo, Kris Bryant, and Javier Baez each homered in the 8–1 blowout. The win moved the Cubs to 13–4 on the season.
- **April 23** – The Reds scored seven runs in the sixth inning off John Lackey and Trevor Cahill as part of a 13-run output to beat the Cubs 13–5. Addison Russell homered in the loss for the Cubs.
- **April 24** – In the final game of the series, the Cubs beat the Reds 9–0 as Anthony Rizzo homered twice and drove in four runs. Jason Heyward drove in three while Tommy La Stella hit his first homer of the season. As a result, the Cubs remained the only team in baseball not to have lost back-to-back games. Jason Hammel pitched six scoreless innings to earn his third win on the season.
- **April 26** – Returning home to Wrigley to face the Milwaukee Brewers, Addison Russell drove in two runs while Dexter Fowler and Anthony Rizzo each drove in a run to beat the Brewers 4–3. The win moved the Cubs to 15–5 on the season.
- **April 28** – After a rainout the day before, the Cubs cruised to an easy 7–2 win over the Brewers as Ben Zobrist drove in two runs and Jake Arrieta only allowed one run.
- **April 29** – The Cubs welcomed the Atlanta Braves to Wrigley but could manage only one run through seven innings. In the eighth, tied at one, Anthony Rizzo singled to take the lead and Matt Szczur hit a grand slam to give the Cubs the 6–1 win.

The Cubs finished the month of April with an MLB-best record of 17–5. Jake Arrieta was selected National League Player of the Month.

==== May ====
- **May 1** – For a second straight game, the Cubs trailed for the majority of the game before the Cubs drew within one in the eighth. In the ninth, trailing 3–2, Ben Zobrist led off the inning with a walk and reached second on an errant pickoff throw by Braves closer, Arodys Vizcaino. Addison Russell then drove in Zobrist with a single to tie the game at three. However, in the 10th, Hector Rondon gave up a run and the Cubs fell 4–3.
- **May 2** – The Cubs next traveled to Pittsburgh to face the Pirates. Prior to the game, the Cubs announced that Jason Heyward had a sore wrist and would miss a few days. Additionally, Matt Szczur experienced tightness in his hamstring and underwent an MRI. In the game, Anthony Rizzo doubled twice and drove in four runs while Dexter Fowler drove in three as the Cubs blew out the Pirates 7–2.
- **May 3** – For the third regular season month in a row (August, September, April), Jake Arrieta was named Pitcher of the Month for the National League, tying a major league record. For a second consecutive game, Anthony Rizzo doubled twice and the Cubs blew out the Pirates, this time 7–1. The win moved the Cubs record to 19–6 on the season.
- **May 4** – In the final game of the series, the Cubs completed the sweep of the Pirates as Anthony Rizzo and Ben Zobrist each homered in the 6–2 win. Jon Lester scattered eight hits in 5.2 innings to notch his third victory on the season.
- **May 5** – The Cubs returned home to face the Washington Nationals in a four-game series. Ben Zobrist homered again for the Cubs and drove in four runs in the game. Kyle Hendricks and the Cub bullpen shutout the Nationals until the ninth as the Cubs won 5–2.
- **May 6** – In game two against the Nationals, John Lackey pitched seven innings and gave up only two runs. Ben Zobrist homered in his third straight game, homering twice, his fourth in three games. Tommy La Stella and Anthony Rizzo also homered for the Cubs who held on to win 8–6.
- **May 7** – Kris Bryant hit his fifth home run of the season and Addison Russell drove in three as the Cubs beat the Nationals yet again, this time 8–5. Seven Cub pitchers appeared in the game to get the win.
- **May 8** – The Cubs completed the four-game sweep of the Nationals, winning 4–3 in 13 innings. After going to extra innings tied at three, Javier Baez homered in the bottom of the 13th to give the Cubs the win. The win marked the best 30-game start for the Cubs since 1907, going 24–6 (went 22–4 in 1907). The Cubs also became the first team since the 1984 Detroit Tigers to win at least 24 of their first 30 games.
- **May 10** – After a day off, the Cubs welcomed the San Diego Padres to Wrigley looking for their eighth straight win. The Cubs took an early 5–0 and held on to win 8–7. Addison Russell drove in three runs and Kris Bryant and Ben Zobrist each drove in two runs in the eighth straight win.
- **May 11** – Looking to win their ninth straight game, the Cubs took a 4–2 lead to the seventh before the Cub bullpen fell apart. The Padres scored four in the seventh and one in the eight to win the game 7–4. The loss marked the end of the Cubs eight-game winning streak.
- **May 12** – The Cubs suffered their first back-to-back losses of the season, the last team to do so, losing to the Padres 1–0. John Lackey pitched eight innings while allowing only one run, but the Cub offense could manage nothing in the loss.
- **May 13** – Welcoming the Pirates back to Chicago, the Cubs scored three runs in the fifth and broke the game open in the fifth as Kris Bryant homered and David Ross hit a three-run homer to extend the lead to 8–0. The Cubs went on to win 9–2, moving to 26–8 on the season.
- **May 14** – The Cubs blew out the Pirates for the second consecutive game behind homers by Anthony Rizzo and Addison Russell. Jake Arrieta pitched eight solid innings as the Cubs won 8–2.
- **May 15** – The Cubs trailed the Pirates 2–0 going into the bottom of the ninth before Anthony Rizzo drove in a run on a sacrifice fly to cut the lead to 2–1. However, Ben Zobrist could not get the game-tying hit with Jason Heyward at second and the Cubs fell 2–1.
- **May 17** – After a day off, the Cubs traveled to Milwaukee to face the Brewers. Kyle Hendricks gave up four runs in 5.1 innings of work and the Cubs could manage only two solo home runs in the ninth by Jason Heyward and Kris Bryant as the Cubs fell 4–2.
- **May 18** – In game two of the series, David Ross threw out four Brewer base runners and the Cubs tied the game at one in the ninth on an Addison Russell groundout. In the 13th, pitcher Travis Wood, batting because the Cubs were out of position players, walked with the bases loaded to force in the winning run as the Cubs won 2–1.
- **May 19** – Jason Hammell gave up four runs in six innings of work and the Cubs managed only three runs despite a Dexter Fowler leadoff home run. As a result, the Cubs fell to the Brewers 5–3.
- **May 20** – Traveling to San Francisco to face the Giants, the Cubs jumped out early, scoring five runs in the second on RBI singles by Jake Arrieta and Tommy La Stella and a three-run home run by Kris Bryant. That would be all Arrieta would need as he allowed only one run in seven innings of work as the Cubs won 8–1. Jason Heyward suffered an injury colliding with the right-center field wall and the team announced he suffered a contusion and would miss a few games.
- **May 21** – Jon Lester only lasted 2.2 innings as he gave up five runs while walking three and allowing six hits. The Cubs scored once in the eighth and once in the ninth, but it was not enough as the Giants won 5–3.
- **May 22** – The Cubs were shutout 1–0 by Madison Bumgarner and the Giant bullpen on Sunday Night Baseball. The loss dropped the Cubs record to 29–13 on the season.
- **May 23** – Traveling to St. Louis to face the Cardinals, the Cubs took a 3–1 lead into the seventh, but John Lackey could not hold the lead, allowing the Cardinals to tie the game. Adam Warren gave up a walkoff solo home run in the bottom of the ninth to Randal Grichuk as the Cubs fell 4–3.
- **May 24** – Jason Heyward returned to the lineup after missing four games and the Cubs scored six runs in the first inning. Jorge Soler drove in three runs in the game. The Cubs added four in the ninth, blowing out the Cardinals 12–3.
- **May 25** – The Cubs again scored six runs in an inning, this time in the second to take a 6–2 lead. Kris Bryant homered and drove in three as the Cubs held on to beat the Cardinals 9–8 and to move to 31–14 on the season.
- **May 27** – Returning to Wrigley to face the Philadelphia Phillies following an off day, Jorge Soler, David Ross, and Kris Bryant homered as the Cubs won 6–2. Jon Lester allowed two runs in 6.1 innings to get the win.
- **May 28** – The Cubs took an early lead against the Phillies in game two as Dexter Fowler led off the bottom of the first with a home run. Kyle Hendricks pitched nine stellar innings, allowing only one run on five hits as the Cubs won 4–1.
- **May 29** – The Cubs again jumped early on the Phillies, scoring in four of the first five innings and taking a 7–0 lead. Ben Zobrist drove in three and John Lackey allowed only one run in seven innings of work as the Cubs won 7–2, sweeping the Phillies.
- **May 30** – With the Los Angeles Dodgers in town, Jason Hammel left a game against the after two innings with a leg cramp. The Cub bullpen combined for seven perfect innings of relief as the Cubs shut out the Dodgers 2–0. Anthony Rizzo and Jason Heyward drove in the runs for the Cubs in the win which moved the Cubs' record to 35–14 on the season.
- **May 31** – The Dodgers returned the favor in game two of the series, shutting out the Cubs. In a pitching duel until the eighth, the Cub bullpen could not build on Jake Arrieta's seven shutout innings, allowing five runs as the Cubs fell 5–0.

The Cubs finished May with a 35–15 record, the best in the majors, and led the NL Central by 6.5 games over the Pirates.

==== June ====
The Cubs began June with the best run differential in the majors, plus 129, and a record of 35–15, also the best. Cubs starting pitchers began the month with a combined earned run average of 2.38.

- **June 1** – Major League Baseball announced results of early All Star Game voting. The Cubs had five players in starting positions: Kris Bryant, Addison Russell, Ben Zobrist, Anthony Rizzo, and Dexter Fowler. Jon Lester pitched game three of the series against the Dodgers and threw a gem, a complete game four-hitter, as the Cubs beat the Dodgers 2–1.
- **June 2** – In the final game of the series against the Dodgers, Javier Baez, Jason Heyward, Kris Bryant, and Anthony Rizzo all homered while Kyle Hendricks continued his streak of great pitching performances, going eight inning while allowing only two runs. The Cubs won easily 7 .
- **June 3** – Returning home to face the Diamondbacks, the teams engaged in a pitching battle through seven innings. With the Cubs leading 1–0 in the eighth, Addison Russell drove in two runs on a double while Javier Baez doubled to drive in two runs and scored on a throwing error to blow the game open. The Cubs notched the 6–0 win to move their record to 38–15 on the season.
- **June 4** – The Cubs fell behind early as Jason Hammel gave up two runs in the first, but he righted the ship to pitch seven strong inning while allowing only those two runs. Hammel helped the Cub offense as well, driving in two runs as Dexter Fowler and Anthony Rizzo homered to give the Cubs the 5–3 win.
- **June 5** – Jake Arrieta gave up three runs on nine hits while the Diamondback pitching staff limited the Cubs to two runs. The 3–2 loss dropped the Cubs to 39–16 on the season.
- **June 6** – Hitting the road to face the Phillies again, the Cubs took a 6–0 lead into the ninth behind Jason Heyward and Anthony Rizzo's two RBIs each. However, in the ninth, Justin Grimm surrendered three runs on a Freddy Galvis three-run homer and Hector Rondon gave up a solo homer to Tommy Joseph before he nailed down the game and the Cubs won 6–4.
- **June 7** – Kyle Hendricks allowed two runs on four hits, but lasted only five innings while Adam Warren gave up one run in relief. The Cub offense could only manage two runs as the Cubs fell 3–2.
- **June 8** – Major League Baseball released an update of All Star Game voting. The Cubs received the four highest number of votes among NL teams: Anthony Rizzo, Kris Bryant, Dexter Fowler, and Ben Zobrist. Addison Russell was also leading at SS. Against the Phillies, the Cubs scored one in the fifth, three in the sixth, and four in the eighth as Kris Bryant and Ben Zobrist homered. John Lackey allowed no runs in seven innings as the Cubs won 8–1. The win move the Cubs' record to 41–18 on the season.
- **June 10** – After an off day, the Cubs traveled to Atlanta to face the Braves. Jason Hammel gave up three runs on eight hits in 5.2 innings of work and Justin Grimm allowed two runs as the Cubs lost 5–1.
- **June 11** – Jake Arrieta's allowed four hits and two runs in an 8–2 victory over the Braves. The win gave Arrieta a record of 7–0 in road starts and 10–1 overall. Jason Heyward, Anthony Rizzo, Miguel Montero, and Kris Bryant all homered in the win.
- **June 12** – Jon Lester allowed one run in seven innings and the Cub offense clobbered the Braves as Anthony Rizzo and Javier Baez drove in three runs apiece while Ben Zobrist and David Ross drove in two runs each. The 13–2 win moved the Cubs to 43–18 on the season.
- **June 13** – Jon Lester was named National League Player of the Week. The Cubs traveled to Washington, D.C. to face the Nationals and Kyle Hendricks struggled, surrendering four runs in 5.1 innings. The Cubs managed only one run off Washington starter Max Scherzer and lost 4–1.
- **June 14** – The Cubs took an early 3–1 lead in game two of the series in Washington. However, John Lackey allowed a run in the seventh and Travis Wood allowed the tying run in the eighth. In the ninth, Addison Russell walked and moved to second on a sacrifice bunt by David Ross. Albert Almora Jr. followed with a double to score Russell and Hector Rondon nailed down the game with a perfect ninth to give the Cubs the 4–3 win.
- **June 15** – In the final game of the series against the Nationals, the Cubs entered the ninth trailing 2–1. Kris Bryant led off the ninth with a double and Anthony Rizzo homered off of Oliver Perez to give the Vubs the 3–2 lead. However, Hector Rondon surrendered a run in the ninth to tie the game. In the 12th, Addison Russell singled to score Albert Almora Jr. and give the Cubs a one-run lead. However, in the bottom of the 10th, Trevor Cahill gave up two runs as the Cubs lost 5–4.
- **June 17** – The Cubs returned home to face the Pirates after an off day. Jake Arrieta pitched six scoreless innings and the Cub bullpen also held the Pirates scoreless. Matt Szczur and Albert Almora Jr. each drove in two runs as the Cubs won easily 6–0. The win moved Arrieta's record to 11–1 on the season.
- **June 18** – In game two of the series against the Pirates, Dexter Fowler left game after first inning with hamstring discomfort. Jon Lester allowed three runs in seven innings, but Anthony Rizzo, Krist Bryant, and David Ross all homered to give the Cubs a 4–3 win.
- **June 19** – Kyle Hendricks allowed one run while scattering seven hits in six innings. The Cubs scored in each of the first three innings on solo home runs by Anthony Rizzo, Javier Baez, Kris Bryant, and again by Rizzo to give the Cubs a 4–0 lead Willson Contreras hit a home run on the first pitch of his first major-league at-bat in the sixth, a two-run homer, becoming the 30th player in the modern-era to do so and the eighth player in Cubs history to homer in his first at-bat. The Cubs won easily 10–5 to move to 47–20 on the season.
- **June 20** – Welcoming the Cardinals to Wrigley, John Lackey gave up three runs in six innings and the Cubs mustered only two runs RBIs by Kris Bryant and Willson Contreras. Despite putting three runners on in the bottom of the ninth, the Cubs could not tie it and lost 3–2.
- **June 21** – In game two against the Cards, Jason Hammel surrendered four runs in 5.2 innings, but the Cub bullpen pitched 3.1 perfect innings to keep the Cubs in the game. However, the Cubs could only muster three runs as they lost their second straight, this time losing 4–3.
- **June 22** – Jake Arrieta gave up two runs in five innings and Justin Grimm surrendered four runs in 1/3 of an inning as the Cubs were blown out 7–2. Miguel Montero left game after a play at the plate with apparent right knee injury. The Cubs were swept by the Cardinals at Wrigley Field for the first time since 1988.
- **June 23** – The Cubs next traveled to Miami to face the Marlins. Jon Lester pitched well, giving up only two runs in seven innings, but Pedro Strop surrendered two runs in the eighth to give the Marlins a 4–2 lead. The Cubs loaded the bases in the top of the ninth but Chris Coghlan struck out and Ben Zobrist flied out to end the game. The loss was the Cubs fourth straight and longest losing streak on the season to that point.
- **June 24** – The next day, the Cubs put up four runs in the first on home runs by Kris Bryant and Willson Contreras and a two-run scoring single by Javier Baez. Kyle Hendrick, however, surrendered a grand slam to the Marlins' Justin Bour in the bottom of the first to tie the game. The game remained tied until the seventh when Contreras singled in the winning run. The 5–4 win snapped the Cubs four-game losing streak.
- **June 25** – The Cubs took an early 3–1 lead over the Marlins in the third game of the series, but Jon Lackey struggled, surrendering seven runs in 4.1 innings. The Cub bullpen surrendered an additional two runs as the Cubs lost 9–6.
- **June 26** – The Cubs' struggles against the Marlins continued in the final game of the series as the Cub bullpen surrendered four runs and the Cubs were blown out 6–1. Having lost six of their last seven games, the Cubs record fell to 48–26 on the season.
- **June 27** – A road trip to Cincinnati to face the Reds was just what the Cubs needed however. Kris Bryant became the first player in MLB history to hit three home runs and two doubles in one game, going 5–5 in the game with six RBIs. His 16 total bases set a franchise record and he became the youngest player in club history to hit three home runs in the same game. The Cubs needed more offense however as Jake Arrieta gave up five runs while the bullpen surrendered an additional three runs. However, Bryant's last homer of the day in the eighth and Anthony Rizzo's homer gave the Cubs a 10–7 lead and they held on for the 11–8 win.
- **June 28** – In game two of the series against the Reds, the Cubs led 2–1 heading into the ninth. However, Hector Rondon blew the save and gave up the tying run forcing the game into extra innings as a 2–2 tie. By the end of the 12th inning, both teams had usedall their position players. As a result, the Cubs used three pitchers to play left field: Travis Wood entered the game in left in the 14th with Spencer Patton beginning the inning at pitcher. He retired the first batter and was sent to left field and Wood replaced him on the mound. Following a groundout, the two players switched positions again. In the 15th inning, Pedro Strop replaced Patton and played left field with Wood returning to pitch. Wood finished the game with 1 1/3 innings pitched, allowing one hit and striking out three. It was the first time since 1961 that three pitchers moved from the mound to outfield and back in the same game. The last time two pitchers did so was in 1986, when the visiting Mets switched Jesse Orosco and Roger McDowell against Cincinnati. In the 15th inning, Javier Baez hit a grand slam, his first career grand slam, which is the latest grand slam, by inning, in Cubs history, to win the game.
- **June 29** – In the final game of the series, Reds outfielder Billy Hamilton took a fly ball hit by Anthony Rizzo off the face which allowed Rizzo to hit a three-run inside-the-park homer run in the first inning. That was all Kyle Hendricks would need as he scattered eight hits while allowing only two runs in 6.2 innings of work. Addison Russell and Albert Almora Jr. also homered for the Cubs as they won easily, 9–2.
- **June 30** – Jon Lester was named National League Pitcher of the Month for June. The Cubs went on to New York to face the Mets in a rematch of the previous year's NLCS where the Cubs were swept by the Mets. The Cubs took an early 2–0 lead in the first on a two-run homer by Kris Bryant. They pushed the lead to 3–0 in the sixth before John Lackey surrendered two runs and the Cub bullpen did the same. The Cubs lost 4–3.

The Cubs finished June with a 51–27 record and an 11-game lead over the Cardinals in the NL Central.

==== July ====
The Cubs began July with the best record in baseball, 51–27, the best run differential, plus 169, and had a run of 10 consecutive months of at least .500 play. The pitching staff had the lowest ERA, the fewest hits allowed, runs allowed, earned runs allowed, and the lowest batting average by opponents in MLB. The Cubs offense, when compared to all teams, was second in on base percentage, second in base runners who eventually score, second in the number of RBIs, and first in walks. Kris Bryant was tied with Todd Frazier of the Chicago White Sox and Mark Trumbo of the Baltimore Orioles for the Major League Home Run lead with 23 and was fourth with 61 RBIs. Anthony Rizzo had 60.
It was announced that the July 12th All-Star game in San Diego would begin with the entire Cubs infield (Bryant, Rizzo, Russell, and Zobrist) as starters. Rizzo led all National League players in votes. Zobrist beat out Daniel Murphy by 88 votes. Fowler, though injured, was the top vote getter for National League outfielders. Lester and Arrieta were also named to the team.

- **July 1** – The Cubs struggles against the Mets continued as Jason Hammel gave up 10 runs in four innings while the Cubs could only muster two runs. The 10–2 loss was the sixth straight loss to the Mets.
- **July 2** – The Cubs fell behind early as Jake Arrieta surrendered two runs in the first and four in his 5.1 innings of work. Despite two RBIs by Anthony Rizzo, the Cubs lost again, this time 4–3.
- **July 3** – Looking to avoid the sweep, the Cubs took a 1–0 lead in the first inning on an Anthony Rizzo run-scoring single. Jon Lester however allowed the Mets to tie it in the first and then allowed seven runs in the second as the Cubs were blown out 14–3. The loss was the eighth straight by the Cubs to the Mets. The Cubs began July 0–3 and had lost 10 of their last 14 games.
- **July 4** – Things looked to be heading in the right direction though as the Reds, whom the Cubs had just swept, came to Wrigley Field. The Cubs snapped their four-game losing streak as they scored six runs in the first two innings behind RBI hits by Addison Russell and Jason Heyward in the first and homers by Kris Bryant and Willson Contreras in the second. The Cubs would add four more runs as Addison Russell also homered and Kyle Hendricks allowed only run. The Cubs won 10–4.
- **July 5** – However the Cubs returned to their recent rough streak as John Lackey gave up six runs in six innings to the Reds and the Cub bullpen surrendered three more including two in the ninth by Pedro Strop. The Cub offense led by Addison Russell's three RBIs could not muster enough as the Cubs lost 9–5.
- **July 6** – Adam Warren got the start for the Cubs in a move to give the Cubs starting pitching staff an extra day of rest. He pitched well, allowing only one run in five innings. The Cub bullpen again struggled however as Trevor Cahill gave up three runs in two innings while the Cub offense could manage only three runs.
- **July 7** – In a makeup game of an earlier rainout, the Braves came to Wrigley and jumped to an early 2–0 lead over Jason Hammel. The Cubs tied in the bottom of the eighth on a run scoring double by Ben Zobrist and took the lead on a two-RBI triple by Willson Contreras. The Cub bullpen continued to struggle however as Hector Rondon gave up a first pitch homer in the ninth to Nick Markakis. In the 11th, Spencer Pattown allowed the winning run as the Cubs lost again 4–3.
- **July 8** – Returning to the road, the Cubs traveled to face the Pirates in the final series before the All-Star game. Jake Arrieta gave up three runs in second, but the Cubs rallied to tie it in the sixth on a Miguel Montero home run. Anthony Rizzo homered in the seventh to give the Cubs the lead, but Arrieta allowed three runs in the bottom of the seventh and the Cubs lost 8–4.
- **July 9** – Jon Lester allowed five runs in three innings and Adam Warren allowed seven runs in two innings as the Cubs were blown out 12–6. Ben Zobrist homered and drove in two in the Cubs' fifth straight loss. The streak marked the longest losing streak on the season for the Cubs.
- **July 10** – In the final game before the All-Star break, John Lackey struggled again allowing five runs in six innings. however, Krist Bryant broke up a 5–5 tie in the eighth with an RBI single and the Cub bullpen held on to the 6–5 win. The Cubs entered the All-Star break with a record of 53–35, having lost 15 out of their last 21 games. However, the Cubs' lead of seven games over St. Louis in the division was still the largest lead in baseball.
- **July 15** – After the All-Star break, the Cubs welcomed the Texas Rangers to Wrigley Field. Kyle Hendricks started the second half off well, shutting out the Rangers over six innings. Addison Russell and Matt Szczur each drove in two runs as the Cubs won easily 6–0.
- **July 16** – Jason Hammel allowed one run in six innings of work while Anthony Rizzo drove in two runs and the Cubs beat the Rangers 3–1.
- **July 17** – Looking to complete the sweep over the Rangers, John Lackey pitched eight innings and allowed four runs. Meanwhile, the Cubs could manage only one run against future Cub Cole Hamels, losing 4–1.
- **July 18** – Facing an eight-game losing streak to the Mets, Jon Lester pitched well at Wrigley, giving up only one run in 7.2 innings. Anthony Rizzo homered and drove in three runs as the Cubs broke their losing streak to the Mets with a 5–1 win.
- **July 19** – Jake Arrieta and Noah Syndergaard engaged in a pitching duel that resulted in a 1–1 tie going in to the ninth. Hector Rondon gave up the go-ahead run in the ninth as the Cubs lost 2–1.
- **July 20** – The Mets and Cubs wore throwback uniforms in the series finale ahead of the weekend's Hall of Fame inductions in the series finale. Kyle Hendricks shut out the Mets in 6.1 innings of work and Anthony Rizzo homered twice and drove in three runs. Addison Russell also drove in two runs as the Cubs won 6–2.
- **July 22** – After an off day, the Cubs travelled to face the Brewers. Dexter Fowler returned from the disabled list with a lead-off home run and drove in three runs as the Cubs beat the Brewers 5–2.
- **July 23** – John Lackey gave up three runs in six innings and the Cub bullpen surrendered three runs as the Cubs lost to the Brewers 6–1.
- **July 24** – Trailing 4–2 in the seventh, Anthony Rizzo hit a bases-clearing double to give the Cubs a 5–4 lead. Ben Zobrist singled to drive in Rizzo as the Cubs went on to beat the Brewers 6–4.
- **July 25** – The Cubs returned to Chicago to face their cross-town rivals, the Chicago White Sox at U.S. Cellular Field. Jake Arrieta gave up four runs in six innings, but the Cubs rallied to tie the game in the ninth on singles by Dexter Fowler and Anthony Rizzo. However Mike Montgomery allowed the winning run to score in the bottom of the ninth as the Cubs lost 5–4.
- **July 26** – Kyle Hendricks allowed three runs in 5.2 innings, but the Cubs were shut out by three White Sox pitchers and lost 3–0.
- **July 27** – Returning to Wrigley Field to face the White Sox, the Cubs blew open a low-scoring game by scoring five runs in the eighth including Addison Russell's first career grand slam. Jason Hammel pitched well, allowing one run in seven innings as the Cubs defeated the White Sox 8–1. Javier Baez and Kris Bryant also homered as the Cubs snap a two-game losing streak. Bryant's homer, his 26th, ties his total home runs from last season. Newly acquired Aroldis Chapman pitches a perfect ninth inning.
- **July 28** – John Lackey out-dueled Chris Sale as the Cubs beat the White Sox 3–1 to split the season series. Newly-acquired Aroldis Chapman pitched 1.1 innings in his first game as a Cub to earn the save.
- **July 29** – The Cubs next welcomed the Seattle Mariners to Chicago. Anthony Rizzo and Jason Heyward each drove in three runs as the Cub offense exploded to score 12 runs. Meanwhile, Jon Lester allowed no runs in six innings as the Cubs won easily 12–1.
- **July 30** – Jake Arrieta allowed two runs in seven inning and Aroldis Chapman gave up his first run as a Cub as the Cubs lost to the Mariners 3–1.
- **July 31** – The Cubs beat the 7–6 in 12 innings. In a game started by Brian Matusz, who departed after giving up six runs in three innings, the Cubs bullpen pitched nine innings of scoreless relief. Trailing 6–3 in the bottom of the ninth, the Cubs rallied to tie the game and force extra innings. Travis Wood again played left field after pitching in the sixth inning. He made a catch against the wall in the seventh and returned to pitch in the eighth inning. Having exhausted all position players and bullpen pitchers, the Cubs were forced to have Jon Lester pinch hit in the bottom of the 12th after Jason Heyward doubled and moved to third on a Willson Contreras sacrifice fly. With two strikes, Lester executed a safety squeeze bunt and Heyward scored to win the game.

The Cubs finished July with a record of 12–14 for the month marking the first time in manager Joe Maddon's tenure that the Cubs had a record under .500 in a single month.

==== August ====
The Cubs began August with the best MLB record of 63–41. The pitching staff once again had the lowest ERA, the fewest hits allowed, fewest runs allowed, fewest earned runs allowed, the lowest batting average by opponents in MLB, and were among the leaders in fewest home runs allowed and in striking out opponent batters. The Cubs offense was among the leaders in on-base percentage, base runners who eventually score, RBI's, and walks. Bryant and Rizzo were among the major league leaders in home runs and RBI's.

- **August 1** – Kyle Hendricks threw a complete game shutout against the Marlins at Wrigley Field and lowered his ERA to 2.22, third best in the National League. His ERA at Wrigley Field this season was 1.19. Addison Russell drove in two runs in the game while Anthony Rizzo doubled and tripled and scored two runs in the 6–0 win.
- **August 2** – Jason Hammel pitched six scoreless innings and left with a 3–0 lead behind RBI singles by Willson Contreras and Dexter Fowler. Anthony Rizzo added a sacrifice fly before Pedro Strop gave up two runs in the top of the seventh. Aroldis Chapman pitched a perfect ninth to secure the 3–2 victory over the Marlins, the Cubs third straight win.
- **August 3** – Cubs completed a sweep of the Marlins with a three-run ninth inning for the win. Trailing 4–2 in the ninth, Dexter Fowler drove in a run on a sacrifice fly and Ben Zobrist walked with the bases loaded to tie the game. On the second pitch to the next batter, Marlins pitcher AJ Ramos uncorked a wild pitch allowing Matt Szczur to score the winning run.
- **August 5** – Hitting the road to face the Athletics in Oakland, Jon Lester allowed two runs in seven innings while Dexter Fowler homered to lead off the game and Jorge Soler also homered in the first. Soler drove in the three runs in the game as the Cubs won easily 7–2.
- **August 6** – Jake Arrieta pitched eight scoreless innings and Ben Zobrist drove in two runs as the Cubs beat the A's 4–0 for their sixth straight win.
- **August 7** – The Cubs scored single runs in the sixth, seventh, and eighth innings while Kyle Hendricks held the A's to one run in eight innings. Aroldis Chapman pitched the ninth as the Cubs won 3–1 and extended their winning streak to seven games. The win also put the Cubs at a season-high 28 games over .500.
- **August 8** – Kyle Hendricks was named National League Player of the Week for the first week of August.
- **August 9** – John Lackey surrendered a run in the first in Anaheim, but held the Angels without a run for seven more innings. A balanced offensive attack for the Cubs saw four players with an RBI each as the Cubs defeated the Angels 5–1, their eighth straight win. The win moved the Cubs to 70 on the season, the first team to win 70 games. Bryant homered and drove in his 70th run becoming the first Cubs player ever to drive in 70 runs in each of his first two seasons.
- **August 10** – Jason Hammel continued his strong streak of pitching, going seven innings and limiting the Angels to no runs. An Anthony Rizzo single and Addison Russell solo home run were all the Cubs needed as they beat the Angels 2–1.
- **August 11** – Returning home to face the Cardinals, Jon Lester surrendered two runs in six innings, but left with a 3–2. The Cub bullpen quickly surrendered the lead and the game moved to extra innings tied at three. In the bottom of the 11th, Anthony Rizzo walked with the bases loaded to score the winning run as the Cubs won 4–3, their 10th straight win. The win moved the Cubs to a season-high 13 game lead over the Cardinals in the NL Central.
- **August 12** – Matt Szczur homered twice, while Willson Contreras, Jorge Soler, and Javier Baez also homered as the Cubs won easily, defeating the Cardinals 13–2, their 11th straight win. The lead in the NL Central increased to 14 games. The Cubs magic number to win the division stood at 34.
- **August 13** – The Cubs took an early 2–0 lead, but Carl Edwards Jr. imploded in the eighth inning allowing five runs while walking four batters. The Cubs added two runs in the bottom of the ninth, but could not recover, losing 8–4, ending their 11 game win streak, and losing for the first time in August.
- **August 14** – The Cubs again took an early 2–0 lead and John Lackey left with a 3–1 lead in the seventh, before the Cub bullpen again imploded. Hector Rondon allowed four runs in the seventh as the Cubs lost their second straight, losing to the Cardinals 6–4.
- **August 16** – After a day off, the Cubs welcomed the Brewers to Chicago for a doubleheader. In game one, started by Trevor Cahill, five Cub pitchers combined to shut out the Brewers. Cahill also drove in a run as the Cubs won 4–0. Aroldis Chapman pitched the ninth for the save.
- **August 16** – In game two against the Brewers, Jason Hammel again pitched well, allowing only two runs in seven innings while the Cubs scored four on a two-run home run by Javier Baez and RBI singles by Kris Bryant and Willson Contreras. Aroldis Chapman finished the game to notch his second save of the day and his sixth save with the Cubs in the 4–1 win.
- **August 17** - In game three of the series, the Cubs jumped to an early 5–0 lead singles by Ben Zobrist and Addison Russell and a three-run homer by Jorge Soler. Jon Lester allowed only one run on three hits while pitching in to the seventh as the Cubs won 6–1.
- **August 18** – The Cubs again jumped out to an early 5–0 lead, but Jake Arrieta surrendered five runs in 5.2 innings and left with the a 7–5 lead. Kris Bryant homered twice and drove in five runs as the Cubs held on to defeat the Brewers 9–6, completing a four-game sweep and moving to a season-high 34 games over .500.
- **August 19** – The Cubs returned to the road to face the Rockies in Denver. The Cubs jumped out to 5–1 lead as Kyle Hendricks allowed just one run in six innings. However, Travis Wood surrendered three runs in the seventh and eighth and Carl Edwards Jr. allowed the tying run in the eighth. Dexter Fowler gave up the Cubs the lead in the top of the 11th with an RBI single. Aroldis Chapman came in the bottom half of the 11th and allowed a single and a double, but a throwing error by Javier Baez allowed the winning run to score from second as the Cubs lost 7–6.
- **August 20** – Kris Bryant homered and drove in four runs while Miguel Montero drove in three runs as the Cubs crushed the Rockes 9–2. Mike Montgomery and Travis Cahill combined to limit the Rockies to two runs in the win.
- **August 21** – Jason Hammel gave up 10 runs in 3.1 innings as the Cubs were blown out 11–4 by the Rockies.
- **August 22** – The Cubs next traveled to San Diego to face the Padres. Jon Lester allowed only one run in six innings while Addison Russell, Kris Bryant, and Jason Heyward homered for the Cubs in the 6–1 win.
- **August 23** – Jake Arrieta threw eight shutout innings while the Cub offense put up five runs behind home runs by Kris Bryan and Addison Russell, his fifth homer in the last five games, to give the Cubs a 5–0 lead. Felix Pena struggled in the ninth, allowing three runs while getting only one out before Aroldis Chapman entered the game to notch the save. The Cubs moved to a season-high 35 games over .500 at 80–45. Their magic number to win the division moved to 25. Jake Arrieta won his league-leading 16th game of the season and lowered his ERA to 2.62. The Cubs hit multiple home runs in each of the last seven games, the longest streak since the Cubs hit multiple home runs in an eight-game stretch from June 25 through July 2, 1961.
- **August 24** – The Cubs completed the three-game sweep of the Padres as Kyle Hendricks allowed only two runs in six innings and the Cubs won 5–3.
- **August 26** – After an off-day, the Cubs traveled to face the Dodgers in Los Angeles. Mike Montgomery gave up three runs in five innings and the Cubs trailed 4–2 entering the eighth. A Kris Byrant home run in the eighth preceded a wild pitch scoring Jason Heyward in the ninth to tie the game. In the 10th, Bryant homered again, a two-run shot, to give the Cubs the 6–4 win. The win moved the Cubs to a season-high 37 games over .500 and increased their division lead to a season-high 14-game.
- **August 27** – Jason Hammel continued to struggle, giving up three runs in 2.1 innings of work before being lifted from the game. The Dodgers, led by five pitchers, limited the Cubs to two runs and the Cubs fell 3–2.
- **August 28** – In the final game of the series against the Dodgers, Jon Lester held the Dodgers scoreless through six, but Trevor Cahill surrendered a run in the eighth. That was all the Dodgers would need as the shut out the Cubs 1–0.
- **August 29** – Following back-to-back road losses to the Los Angeles Dodgers, the Cubs returned home to face the third-place Pirates. The Cubs jumped out to a 3–0 lead early, but Jake Arrieta gave up the lead and trailed 6–3 in the eighth. Willson Contreras hit a two-run homer in the eighth and Jorge Soler tied it with a homer in the ninth to send the game into extra innings. The Cubs won it in the 13th inning after giving up the go-ahead run in the top of the 13th. Miguel Montero plated two runs to give the Cubs the 8–7 win. The Cubs magic number to win the division moved to 19 and their magic number to secure home-field advantage in the National League playoffs moved to 25.
- **August 30** – Kyle Hendricks pitched seven scoreless innings as the Cubs shut out the Pirates 3–0. Anthony Rizzo's first inning two-run home run was all the Cubs needed for the win.
- **August 31** – The Cubs jumped to a 5–1 lead on the Pirates behind two RBIs by Addison Russell. The Cubs held on from there to complete a three-game sweep of Pittsburgh Pirates, winning 6–5. The Cubs finished the month with 22 wins, the most wins in any month for the Cubs since 1945 when they went 22–10 in September of that year. The Cubs lead in the division moved to 15 games, a season high, and their largest first-place lead since the end of the 1907 season. The Cubs magic number moved to 16 as they moved to a season-high 38 games over .500.

Through August 22, Kyle Hendricks led the Majors in ERA for pitchers with over 140 innings at 2.16. Jake Arrieta was fourth at 2.75 and Jon Lester was fifth at 2.81. Addison Russell's 84 RBIs were the most in one season by a Cubs shortstop since Ernie Banks in 1960.

The Cubs record for the month of August was 22–6 and their overall record of 85–47 was the best in baseball. Their home record of 48–19 was also the best in baseball. The pitching staff once again led the league with the lowest earned run average of 3.13, fewest hits allowed at 926, fewest runs allowed at 450, fewest earned runs allowed at 415, the lowest batting average by opponents at .213, and were among the leaders in fewest home runs allowed and in striking out opponent batters. The Cubs offense was among the leaders in on-base percentage, base runners who eventually score, runs batted in, and drawing walks. Kyle Hendricks entered September with an earned run average of 2.09 in 159 innings pitched which led all major league starting pitchers. Kris Bryant hit eight home runs and drove in 18 runs with a batting average of .456 and an on base percentage of .549 in the last 15 games. He had a post All-Star break batting average of .346.

==== September ====
- **September 1** – After falling behind 4–3 to the Giants, Addison Russell drove in two runs on a single in the seventh to give the Cubs the 5–4 win.
- **September 2** – Jon Lester pitched a complete game while allowing only one run on 102 pitches. David Ross and Dexter Fowler drove in the only two runs the Cubs would need as the Cubs beat Giants 2–1 to move to 40 games over .500. Jon Lester earned his 15th win of the season with a complete game three-hitter. The Cubs magic number was reduced to 14.
- **September 3** – Kyle Hendricks was named National League Pitcher of the Month for August while Kris Bryant was named National League Player of the Month. Jake Arrieta gave up three runs in six innings and the Cubs could manage only two against the Giants as they lost 3–2.
- **September 4** – John Lackey allowed only two runs in five innings, but the Cub offenses managed only one run off Giant pitcher Johnny Cueto. Still trailing 2–1 in the bottom of the ninth, Addison Russell doubled to lead off the inning and Jason Heyward drove him in to tie the game. The game remained tied at two into the 13th when Anthony Rizzo singled and moved to second on a groundout by Ben Zobrist. The Giants chose to walk Addison Russell and Jason Heyward came through again, singling to score Rizzo and win the game 3–2.
- **September 5** – The Cubs next traveled to Milwaukee to face the Brewers. Falling behind early 1–0, the Cubs were held scoreless until the sixth when Jorge Soler drove in a run to tie the game. In the seventh, the Cubs added two more runs on singles by Chris Coghlan and Tommy La Stella. The Cubs blew the game open in the eighth, scoring four runs to beat the Brewers 7–2. The wing moved the Cubs to a season-high 41 games over .500. Hendricks lowered his baseball-leading ERA to 2.07. The Cubs magic number was reduced to 10.
- **September 6** – Jason Hammel's struggles continued as he allowed 13 hits and nine runs in 5.2 innings of work. Anthony Rizzo homered and drove in three as the Cub offense pushed across three of their five run in the eighth and ninth with the game already over as the Cubs lost 12–5.
- **September 7** – Mike Montgomery allowed one run in five innings, but the Cubs could muster only one run against Brewer starter Matt Garza. Joe Smith surrendered one run in the eighth as the Cubs lost 2–1.
- **September 9** – Traveling to Houston to face their former divisional rival Astros after an off day, Kris Bryant homered in the fifth to give the Cubs a 2–0 lead. Jon Lester scattered seven hits in seven innings and Hector Rondon and Arold Chapman combined for two perfect innings of relief as the Cubs won 2–0. The win was the Cubs 90th of the season, the first team to win 90 games on the season. The last time the Cubs were the first team to 90 wins was 1945 - the last time the Cubs appeared in the World Series. Having finished the 2015 season with 97 wins, it was also the first time since 1928, 1929, and 1930 that the Cubs reached 90 wins in consecutive years.
- **September 10** – John Lackey gave up only two runs, but the Cubs only mustered one as they lost to the Astros 2–1.
- **September 11** – The Cubs jumped out early lead on the Astros, scoring nine runs in the first four innings. Jake Arrieta allowed three runs in 5.1 innings of work as the Cubs won 9–5 to win the series and reduce their magic number to five.
- **September 12** – Traveling to St. Louis, Kyle Hendricks lost a no-hitter bid in the ninth after Jeremy Hazelbaker homered. Hendricks lowered his league-leading ERA to 2.03. However, the Cubs won the game 4–1 behind homers by Dexter Fowler and Ben Zobrist. The performance by Hendricks marked the 20th straight outing where he gave up three runs or less. The Cubs magic number was reduced to three.
- **September 13** – Jason Hammel pitched better, but still allowed four runs in 5.2 innings of work. The Cubs, who chased Cardinals starter Jaime García in the second with two runs, could score nothing further and the Cubs lost 4–2.
- **September 14** – Cubs defeated the Cardinals 7–0 behind Jon Lester's eight innings of shutout ball. Anthony Rizzo homered twice and David Ross added a homer and two RBIs in the win. The win clinched a playoff berth for the Cubs as they were assured of at least a wild card berth. The magic number to clinch the division was reduced to one.
- **September 15** – Returning home to face the Brewers, Mike Montgomery and Justin Grimm surrendered five runs in just over six innings of work. Despite a Jorge Soler homer, the Cubs could not pull it out and lost to the Brewers 5–4. However, the Cubs clinched the National League Central Division crown when the Cardinals lost to the Giants later that evening. This marked the first time since 2008 that the Cubs had won the division. The Cubs were the first team to clinch their division and did so earlier than any other team since the 2008 Angels.
- **September 16** – With lineup mostly made up of backups, as the team had celebrated clinching the division the night before, the Cubs trailed 4–2 going in to the bottom of the ninth. Chris Coghlan drove in a run on a single then scored the tying run on an Addison Russell single. In the 10th, Miguel Montero homered to give the Cubs the 5–4 win over the Brewers.
- **September 17** – The Cubs jumped out to an early 3–0 lead on the Brewers, however Jake Arrieta surrendered four runs in six innings of work and left trailing 4–3. The Cubs bullpen fell apart from there, giving up seven runs in the eighth and ninth as the Cubs lost 11–3.
- **September 18** – Kyle Hendricks continued his strong pitching performance on the season, pitching six innings and allowing only two runs. However, the Cubs managed only one run against the Brewers and the Cubs lost 3–1.
- **September 19** – With homers by Willson Contreras, Addison Russell, and Jason Heyward, the Cubs beat the Reds at Wrigley Field 5–2 and reduced magic number to guarantee home-field advantage in the playoffs to five. Jason Hammel pitched well, giving up only two runs in seven innings.
- **September 20** – Anthony Rizzo drove in three runs while Jon Lester limited the Reds to only one run in seven innings. The Cubs cruised to a 6–1 victory.
- **September 21** – In the final game of the series against the Reds, John Lackey allowed only two runs in seven innings. Miguel Montero drove in three runs while Dexter Fowler and Kris Bryant each homered as the Cubs won 9–2 to sweep series and reduce magic number for home-field advantage to two.
- **September 23** – After an off day, the Cubs welcomed the Cardinals to Wrigley. The Cubs plated four runs in the first and Jake Arrieta scattered five hits in seven innings. the Cub bullpen completed the shutout as the Cubs beat the Cardinals 5–0 for their 98th win of the season, surpassing the prior year's total and marking the most wins for the Cubs since 1945. The win was also their 56th home victory, tying a team record. The magic number for home-field advantage was reduced to one. Following the Nationals' loss later that night, the Cubs clinched home-field advantage in the NL playoffs.
- **September 24** – Jason Hammel gave up six runs in the first three innings as the Cubs were blown out by the Cardinal 10–4. A homer by Willson Contreras was not enough in the defeat.
- **September 25** – In their final regular season game at Wrigley Field of the season, Jon Lester shut out the Cardinals for 6.2 innings. A home run by David Ross and RBIs by Willson Contreras and Addison Russell gave the Cubs the 3–1 win. The win was the 57th at home for the Cubs, breaking the team record from 1933 and 1935. The win also marked the team's 99th with of the season, the most wins by a Cubs' team since 1935. David Ross, in his last regular season home game prior to his retirement, was saluted by the crowd on several occasions and hit a solo home run, his tenth of the season. Ross became the ninth Cubs player with at least ten home runs on the season. Jon Lester recorded his 19th win of the season, the first NL pitcher to do so, while moving into second place in ERA with a 2.28 ERA (trailing only teammate Kyle Hendricks).
- **September 26** – Javier Baez homered and drove in six runs while Kris Bryant homered and drove in two as the Cubs visited Pittsburgh. Kyle Hendricks shut out the Pirates through six innings as the Cubs beat the Pirates 12–2 to win their 100th game of the season, the first time they had won at least 100 games since 1935. Kyle Hendricks lowered his league-leading ERA to 1.99. Kris Bryant hit his career-high 39th home run of the season and reached 101 RBIs, also a career high.
- **September 27** – Leading 6–1 in the ninth, the Cubs surrendered three runs to the Pirates in the bottom of the ninth, but held on for the 6–4 win. The win marked their 101st win of the season, the most wins by a Cubs team since 1910.
- **September 28** – Jake Arrieta gave up seven runs in just five innings as the Cubs lost 8–4. Anthony Rizzo's first inning homer marked his 32nd of the season.
- **September 29** – Cubs and Pirates tied 1–1 after five innings due to rain. It marked the first tie in MLB since 2005, and the first tie for the Cubs since 1993. While the tie was not reflected in the clubs' final records, the statistics from the game are official.
- **September 30** – Traveling to Cincinnati for the final series of the regular season, Jake Buchanan got the start and win for the Cubs as he held the Reds scoreless through five innings. Ben Zobrist homered twice and drove in three runs as the Cubs won 7–3.

With only two games left in the regular season, the Cubs finished September with a record of 102–57, the best record in baseball. The pitching staff approached the playoffs with three Cy Young Award candidates in Arrieta, Lester, and Hendricks. The entire staff led the league with the fewest hits, runs, and earned runs allowed. They also had the lowest opponent batting average and the lowest WHIP.

==== October ====
- **October 1** – Jon Lester gave up five runs in five innings as the Cubs lost to the Reds 7–4.
- **October 2** – In the final regular season game, the Cubs trailed the Reds 4–2 entering the eighth inning. Willson Contreras homered in the eighth to move the Cubs within a run. In the ninth, Matt Szczur doubled in two runs and Miguel Montero homered to give the Cubs the 7–4 win. The win marked the 103rd of the season for the Cubs, the most for the franchise since 1910. Kyle Hendricks gave up four runs in five innings of work, marking the first time in his last 23 starts that he gave up more than three runs, but finished the season with a league-leading ERA of 2.13.

At the conclusion of the regular season, the pitching staff had a major league-low team ERA of 3.15, the fewest runs allowed at 556, the fewest earned runs allowed at 511, the lowest batting average by opponents at .212 and were among the leaders in fewest home runs allowed and in striking out opponent batters. The Cubs offense, when compared to all major league teams, was among the leaders in on-base percentage (.343), base runners who eventually score (808), RBI's and drawing walks (656). Their run differential was +252. The Cubs had two serious MVP candidates in Kris Bryant and Anthony Rizzo and three possible Gold Glove winners.

=== Transactions ===
==== April ====
April 7	OF Kyle Schwarber tore anterior cruciate ligament and lateral collateral ligament in his left knee in collision with Dexter Fowler, placed on 60-day DL. Out for the regular season. IF Munenori Kawasaki recalled from AAA Iowa.
April 13	Acquired LHP Giovanni Soto from the Cleveland Indians for cash.
April 15	Optioned IF Munenori Kawasaki to AAA Iowa, IF Javier Baez recalled from Iowa.
April 28	Placed C Miguel Montero (stiff back) on the 15-day DL retroactive to April 25. C Tim Federowicz called up from Iowa.

==== May ====
May 3	Placed OF Matt Szczur (mild right hamstring strain) on 15-day DL. OF Ryan Kalish called up from Iowa.
May 11	Called up RHP Carl Edwards, Jr. as the 26th man for the doubleheader.
May 14	Activated C Miguel Montero, OF Ryan Kalish designated for assignment.
May 17	Signed RHP Joe Nathan and placed him on the 60-day DL.
May 21	OF Matt Szczur activated from the 15-day DL, LHP Neil Ramirez designated for assignment.

==== June ====
June 6	OF Jorge Soler (hamstring strain) placed on 15-day DL. OF Albert Almora Jr. called up from Iowa.
June 9	OF/IF Chris Coghlan reacquired from the Oakland A's in exchange for IF Arismendy Alcántara. IF Tommy La Stella (hamstring) placed on 15-day DL. Coghlan takes place on roster. RHP Joel Peralta signs minor league deal with Cubs.
June 12	Claimed RHP R.J. Alvarez off of waivers from the Oakland A's. Alvarez sent to Iowa.
June 14	Signed LHP Brian Matusz to a minor league deal.
June 17	Selected contract of C Willson Contreras from Iowa. C Tim Federowicz designated for assignment.
June 20	Placed OF Dexter Fowler (hamstring) on the 15-day DL. RHP Carl Edwards, Jr.recalled from Iowa.
June 21	Placed RHP Clayton Richard on 15-day DL (blister). RHP Adam Warren optioned to Iowa. Recalled LHP Gerardo Concepción and RHP Spencer Patton.
June 27	Recalled RHP Joel Peralta and optioned LHP Gerardo Concepción back to Iowa.

==== July ====
July 3	IF Chris Coghlan placed on 15-day DL (strained ribcage), 3B Jeimer Candelario recalled from Iowa.
July 6	Activated IF Tommy La Stella from DL and recalled RHP Adam Warren from Iowa. RHP Joel Peralta designated for assignment and C David Ross placed on 7-day concussion DL.
July 9	Recalled IF Munenori Kawasaki, 3B Jeimer Candelario optioned to Iowa.
July 11	IF Munenori Kawasaki optioned to Iowa.
July 15	RHP Trevor Cahill placed on 15-day DL (knee), LHP Clayton Richard and C David Ross activated from DL.
July 18	Trevor Cahill, Dexter Fowler, and Jorge Soler are sent to Iowa Cubs for rehab assignments.
July 20	Acquired LHP Mike Montgomery from Seattle in exchange for minor league 1B Dan Vogelbach and RHP Paul Blackburn. Also received minor league RHP Jordan Pries.
July 21	Optioned RHP Spencer Patton to Iowa.
July 22	OF Dexter Fowler activated from DL, OF Albert Almora Jr. optioned to Iowa.
July 24	Activated RHP Joe Nathan from 60-day DL, RHP Adam Warren optioned to Iowa.
July 25	Acquired LHP Aroldis Chapman from New York Yankees in exchange for RHP Adam Warren, minor league SS Gleyber Torres, minor league OF Billy McKinney, and minor league OF Rashad Crawford.
July 26	LHP Clayton Richard designated for assignment, LHP Aroldis Chapman added to active roster.
July 29	Activated IF Chris Coghlan from DL, optioned IF Tommy La Stella to Iowa.
July 31	Recalled LHP Brian Matusz, RHP Justin Grimm optioned to Iowa.

==== August ====
August 1	LHP Brian Matusz designated for assignment, RHP Spencer Patton recalled. Acquired RHP Joe Smith from Los Angeles Angels of Anaheim in exchange for minor league RHP Jesus Castillo.
August 2	RHP Joe Smith added to roster, RHP Spencer Patton optioned to Iowa.
August 3	RHP Jason Hammel placed on bereavement list, RHP Justin Grimm recalled from Iowa.
August 6	RHP Joe Nathan released.
August 9	RHP Jason Hammel activated from bereavement list, RHP Justin Grimm sent back to Iowa.
August 11	RHP Pedro Strop placed on 15-day DL (meniscus tear in his left knee), RHP Justin Grimm recalled from Iowa.
August 16	RHP Trevor Cahill activated from DL for doubleheader as 26th member of roster.
August 17	RHP Joe Smith placed on 15-day DL (hamstring strain), RHP Trevor Cahill remains on roster. OF Chris Coghlan also placed on DL with rib contusion, RHP Spencer Patton recalled.
August 19	RHP John Lackey (shoulder) and RHP Héctor Rondón (triceps) to the DL, RHP Félix Peña and LHP Rob Zastryzny recalled from Iowa.
August 31	IF Tommy La Stella recalled from Iowa, RHP Spencer Patton optioned to Iowa.

==== September ====
September 1	OF Chris Coghlan and RHP Joe Smith activated from DL. RHP Jake Buchanan called up from Iowa.
September 4	RHP John Lackey activated from DL to make start.
September 6	Activated RHP Héctor Rondón from DL. OF Albert Almora Jr., C Tim Federowicz, IF Munenori Kawasaki, and RHP Spencer Patton recalled from Iowa. RHP R.J. Alvarez designated for assignment.

== Roster ==
2016 Chicago Cubs
Roster
Pitchers: 49 Jake Arrieta; 43 Jake Buchanan; 53 Trevor Cahill; 54 Aroldis Chapman; 50 Gerardo Concepción; 6 Carl Edwards Jr.; 52 Justin Grimm; 39 Jason Hammel; 28 Kyle Hendricks; 41 John Lackey; 34 Jon Lester; 15 Brian Matusz; 38 Mike Montgomery; 36 Joe Nathan; 40,45 Spencer Patton; 60 Félix Peña; 62 Joel Peralta; 33 Clayton Richard; 56 Héctor Rondón; 30 Joe Smith; 46 Pedro Strop; 43 Adam Warren; 37 Travis Wood; 29 Rob Zastryzny	Catchers: 40 Willson Contreras; 15,19 Tim Federowicz; 47 Miguel Montero; 3 David Ross; Infielders: 9 Javier Báez; 17 Kris Bryant; 7 Jeimer Candelario; 66 Munenori Kawasaki; 2 Tommy La Stella; 44 Anthony Rizzo; 27 Addison Russell; 18 Ben Zobrist	Outfielders: 5 Albert Almora Jr.; 8 Chris Coghlan; 24 Dexter Fowler; 22 Jason Heyward; 51 Ryan Kalish; 12 Kyle Schwarber; 68 Jorge Soler; 20 Matt Szczur	Manager: 70 Joe Maddon; Coaches: 64 Henry Blanco (quality assurance); 58 Mike Borzello (catching); 25 Chris Bosio (pitching); -- Doug Dascenzo (outfield); 77 Eric Hinske (assistant hitting); 16 Brandon Hyde (first base); 1 Gary Jones (third base); 11 John Mallee (hitting); 4 Dave Martinez (bench); 95 Chad Noble (bullpen catcher); 35 Lester Strode (bullpen)

== Postseason ==
=== Game log ===
2016 postseason game log (11–6 (Home: 5–3; Away: 6–3))
National League Division Series: 3–1 (Home: 2–0; Away: 1–1)

#	Date	Opponent	Score	Win	Loss	Save	Attendance	Series
1	October 7	Giants	1–0	**Lester** (1–0)	Cueto (0–1)	**Chapman** (1)	42,148	1–0
2	October 8	Giants	5–2	**Wood** (1–0)	Samardzija (0–1)	**Chapman** (2)	42,392	2–0
3	October 10	@ Giants	5–6 (13)	Blach (1–0)	**Montgomery** (0–1)	—	43,571	2–1
4	October 11	@ Giants	6–5	**Rondón** (1–0)	Smith (0–1)	**Chapman** (3)	43,166	3–1

National League Championship Series: 4–2 (Home: 2–1; Away: 2–1)

#	Date	Opponent	Score	Win	Loss	Save	Attendance	Series
1	October 15	Dodgers	8–4	**Chapman** (1–0)	Blanton (0–1)	—	42,376	1–0
2	October 16	Dodgers	0–1	Kershaw (1–0)	**Hendricks** (0–1)	Jansen (1)	42,384	1–1
3	October 18	@ Dodgers	0–6	Hill (1–0)	**Arrieta** (0–1)	—	54,269	1–2
4	October 19	@ Dodgers	10–2	**Montgomery** (1–0)	Urías (0–1)	—	54,449	2–2
5	October 20	@ Dodgers	8–4	**Lester** (1–0)	Blanton (0–2)	—	54,449	3–2
6	October 22	Dodgers	5–0	**Hendricks** (1–1)	Kershaw (1–1)	—	42,386	4–2

World Series: 4–3 (Home: 1–2; Away: 3–1)

#	Date	Opponent	Score	Win	Loss	Save	Attendance	Series
1	October 25	@ Indians	0–6	Kluber (1–0)	**Lester** (0–1)	—	38,091	0–1
2	October 26	@ Indians	5–1	**Arrieta** (1–0)	Bauer (0–1)	—	38,172	1–1
3	October 28	Indians	0–1	Miller (1–0)	**Edwards Jr.** (0–1)	Allen (1)	41,703	1–2
4	October 29	Indians	2–7	Kluber (2–0)	**Lackey** (0–1)	—	41,706	1–3
5	October 30	Indians	3–2	**Lester** (1–1)	Bauer (0–2)	**Chapman** (1)	41,711	2–3
6	November 1	@ Indians	9–3	**Arrieta** (2–0)	Tomlin (0–1)	—	38,116	3–3
7	November 2	@ Indians	8–7 (10)	**Chapman** (1–0)	Shaw (0–1)	**Montgomery** (1)	38,104	4–3

Legend: = Win = Loss = Postponement
Bold = Cubs team member

=== Division Series ===
==== Game 1 ====
Friday, October 7, 2016 8:16 pm CDT at Wrigley Field in Chicago, Illinois
Team	1	2	3	4	5	6	7	8	9	R	H	E
San Francisco	0	0	0	0	0	0	0	0	0	**0**	**6**	**0**
**Chicago**	0	0	0	0	0	0	0	1	X	**1**	**3**	**0**
WP: Jon Lester (1–0) LP: Johnny Cueto (0–1) Sv: Aroldis Chapman (1); Home runs: SF: None; CHI: Javier Báez (1); Attendance: 42,148

The Cubs began postseason play with starter Jon Lester on the mound facing Johnny Cueto for the Wild Card Game-winning Giants. In the pitching duel, Lester scattered five hits in eight innings of work, shutting out the Giants. Cueto also blanked the Cubs allowing only two hits prior to the eighth inning. In the eighth, Javier Báez hit a solo home run into the left field basket to put the Cubs up 1–0. Aroldis Chapman appeared for the save in the ninth and gave up a double to Buster Posey, but shut the Giants down as the Cubs took a 1–0 series lead.

==== Game 2 ====
Saturday, October 8, 2016 7:08 pm CDT at Wrigley Field in Chicago, Illinois
Team	1	2	3	4	5	6	7	8	9	R	H	E
San Francisco	0	0	2	0	0	0	0	0	0	**2**	**6**	**1**
**Chicago**	1	3	0	1	0	0	0	0	X	**5**	**9**	**3**
WP: Travis Wood (1–0) LP: Jeff Samardzija (0–1) Sv: Aroldis Chapman (2); Home runs: SF: None; CHI: Travis Wood (1); Attendance: 42,392

In game two of the series, the Cubs scored a run in the first inning on a Ben Zobrist single off former Cub Jeff Samardzija. Starting pitcher Kyle Hendricks had the key hit in the second inning, driving in two runs on a single up the middle. Kris Bryant drove in the Cubs' fourth run of the game two batters later and the Cubs led 4–0, forcing Samardzija from the game. In the top of the third, the Giants answered, scoring two runs on back-to-back doubles by Joe Panik and pinch-hitter Gregor Blanco and a sacrifice fly by Brandon Belt. Hendricks was then hit in the arm by an Ángel Pagán line drive, forcing him to leave the game. Reliever Travis Wood ended the Giants' rally and, in the bottom half of the inning, hit a solo home run to put the Cubs up 5–2. The home run was the first by a relief pitcher in a postseason game since 1924. The Cub bullpen of Carl Edwards Jr., Mike Montgomery, and Héctor Rondón shut down the Giants for the remainder of the game with Aroldis Chapman getting the save.

==== Game 3 ====
Monday, October 10, 2016 8:39 pm CDT at AT&T Park in San Francisco, California
Team	1	2	3	4	5	6	7	8	9	10	11	12	13	R	H	E
Chicago	0	3	0	0	0	0	0	0	2	0	0	0	0	**5**	**10**	**2**
**San Francisco**	0	0	1	0	1	0	0	3	0	0	0	0	1	**6**	**13**	**1**
WP: Ty Blach (1–0) LP: Mike Montgomery (0–1); Home runs: CHI: Kris Bryant (1), Jake Arrieta (1); SF: None; Attendance: 43,571

The Cubs looked to finish the series sweep with Jake Arrieta facing the Giants' Madison Bumgarner in game three. The Giants looked to extend their winning streak to 10–0 in their last 10 elimination games. Arrieta hit a three-run homer in the top of the second, putting the Cubs up 3–0. The Cubs threatened to chase Bumgarner from the game in the third inning putting runners on first and second with only one out following singles by Ben Zobrist and Addison Russell. However, the Cubs failed to score and the Giants scored a run in the third following a Denard Span double and added a second run in the fifth following Span's triple. In the eighth inning, Travis Wood gave up a single and Héctor Rondón walked a batter. Closer Aroldis Chapman came in early to get a six-out save, but Chapman gave up a two-run triple to Conor Gillaspie to give the Giants' their first lead of the series. Chapman was lifted shortly thereafter, getting only one out. The Giants added another run on a single by Brandon Crawford. In the ninth, trailing 5–3, Dexter Fowler led off with a walk and Kris Bryant hit a two-run home run off Giants' closer Sergio Romo to tie the game. Mike Montgomery took over in the ninth for the Cubs and held the Giants scoreless for four innings. In the 13th inning, the Giants' Brandon Crawford doubled to lead off the inning and Joe Panik doubled him home to send the series to a game four.

==== Game 4 ====
Tuesday, October 11, 2016 7:40 pm CDT at AT&T Park in San Francisco, California
Team	1	2	3	4	5	6	7	8	9	R	H	E
**Chicago**	0	0	1	0	1	0	0	0	4	**6**	**6**	**0**
San Francisco	1	0	0	2	2	0	0	0	0	**5**	**11**	**2**
WP: Héctor Rondón (1–0) LP: Will Smith (0–1) Sv: Aroldis Chapman (3); Home runs: CHC: David Ross (1); SF: None; Attendance: 43,166

The Giants looked to continue their streak of wins in elimination games to 11 as the Cubs sent John Lackey to the mound against the Giants' Matt Moore. Lackey started off slow, allowing a leadoff double to Denard Span and a sacrifice fly by Buster Posey to give the Giants an early 1–0 lead. David Ross answered for the Cubs in the third with a solo home run to tie the game. The home run made Ross the oldest catcher ever to homer in a postseason game. However, Lackey got in trouble again in the fourth, giving up a run-scoring to single to Moore with the bases loaded and a force-out grounder by Span to put the Giants up 3–1. The Cubs bounced back with a run in the top of the fifth on a sacrifice fly by Ross. Justin Grimm relieved Lackey in the bottom of the fifth and surrendered a single to Posey and a double that just missed being a home run by Brandon Crawford. Travis Wood entered and gave up a single to Conor Gillaspie and sacrifice fly to Joe Panik as the Giants surged to a 5–2 lead. Moore cruised through the next three innings, retiring the Cubs in order in the eighth before being lifted for the Giants' bullpen to start the ninth as it appeared a Game 5 was inevitable. However, the Giants ended up using five pitchers in the inning as Kris Bryant singled, Anthony Rizzo walked, and Ben Zobrist doubled to score Bryant and tighten the game at 5–3. Cubs manager Joe Maddon then decided to pinch hit for Addison Russell and his 95 RBIs with little-used Chris Coghlan. This caused Giants manager Bruce Bochy to counter with lefty reliever Will Smith and Maddon went to rookie catcher Willson Contreras instead. Contreras promptly singled up the middle to tie the game at five. Jason Heyward's attempted sacrifice bunt was too hard and Contreras was forced out at second, but gold-glove winner Crawford's throw to first ended up in the dugout allowing Heyward to reach second with one out. Javier Báez then singled up the middle to complete the comeback and give the Cubs the 6–5 lead. Aroldis Chapman struck out the side in the bottom of the ninth as the Cubs eliminated the Giants and moved on to the NLCS. The Cubs' comeback marked the biggest comeback in postseason-clinching history.

==== Composite line score ====
2016 NLDS (3–1): Chicago Cubs defeated San Francisco Giants.

Team	1	2	3	4	5	6	7	8	9	10	11	12	13	R	H	E
San Francisco Giants	1	0	3	2	3	0	0	3	0	0	0	0	1	**13**	**36**	**4**
Chicago Cubs	1	3	4	1	1	0	0	1	6	0	0	0	0	**17**	**28**	**5**
Home runs: SF: None; CHC: Javier Báez (1), Travis Wood (1), Kris Bryant (1), Jake Arrieta (1), David Ross (1); Total attendance: 171,277 Average attendance: 42,819

=== Championship Series ===
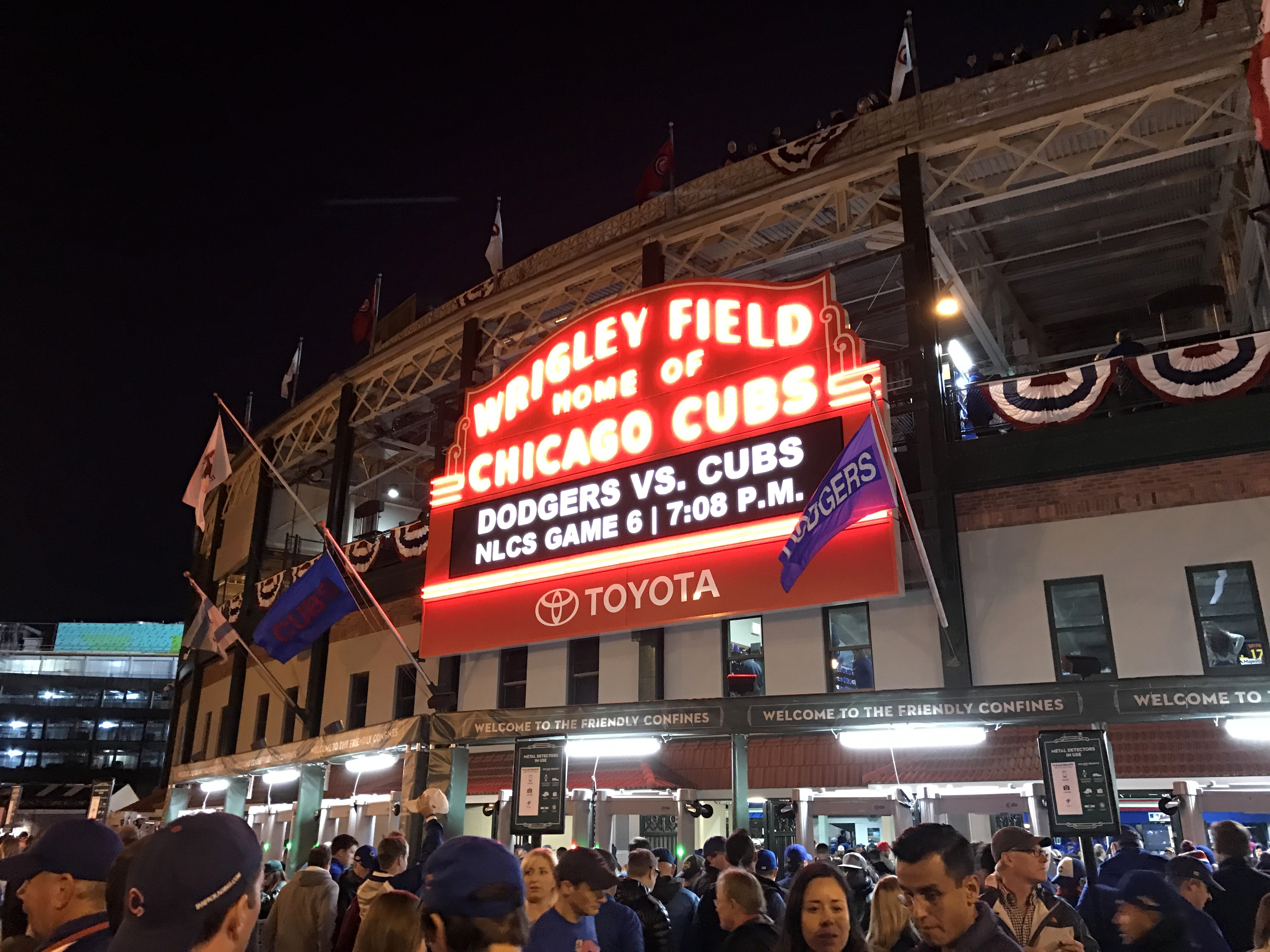
Outside Wrigley Field, minutes before NLCS Game 6

==== Game 1 ====
Saturday, October 15, 2016 7:08pm CDT at Wrigley Field in Chicago, Illinois
Team	1	2	3	4	5	6	7	8	9	R	H	E
Los Angeles	0	0	0	0	1	0	0	2	1	**4**	**9**	**0**
**Chicago**	1	2	0	0	0	0	0	5	X	**8**	**9**	**0**
WP: Aroldis Chapman (1–0) LP: Joe Blanton (0–1); Home runs: LAD: Andre Ethier (1); CHC: Miguel Montero (1), Dexter Fowler (1); Attendance: 42,376

The NLCS opened at Wrigley Field with the Cubs' Jon Lester facing Kenta Maeda for the Dodgers. The Cubs moved on top early, scoring in the first on a lead-off single by Dexter Fowler and a Kris Bryant double. The Cubs added to their lead in the second when Jason Heyward tripled to start the inning and Javier Báez doubled him home, putting the lead at 2–0. Báez advanced to third on a wild pitch by Maeda and stole home on a late throw by Dodgers catcher Carlos Ruiz. Lester cruised until the fifth inning when he allowed a pinch-hit home run by Andre Ethier, batting for Maeda, pulling the Dodgers within two at 3–1. Lester was lifted for a pinch hitter in the bottom of the sixth with a runner on second and two out, but the Cubs could not cash in on the scoring opportunity. In the top of the eighth, the Dodgers loaded the bases off Cubs relievers Mike Montgomery and Pedro Strop, bringing Aroldis Chapman into the game with no outs. Chapman struck out the first two batters he faced and appeared to be on the verge of escaping the inning, but Adrián González singled up the middle scoring two runs and tying the game at three. The Dodgers brought in reliever Joe Blanton in the bottom of the eighth to try to keep the game tied. However, Ben Zobrist doubled to lead off the inning. Blanton struck out Addison Russell and the Dodgers chose to walk the left hand-hitting Heyward to face Báez. Báez could not come through, flying out softly to right field. Left hander Chris Coghlan pinch hit for David Ross and was also intentionally walked to load the bases. Batting for the pitcher, Miguel Montero, also a left hander, forced the Dodgers to choose to bring in a lefty reliever to face him and possibly see Willson Contreras instead or face Montero. The Dodgers chose to face Montero and on an 0–2 pitch, Montero hit a grand slam, putting the Cubs up 7–3. Fowler followed with a solo home run and Héctor Rondón gave up a run in the ninth as the Cubs won 8–4 and took the series lead 1–0.

==== Game 2 ====
Sunday, October 16, 2016 7:08pm CDT at Wrigley Field in Chicago, Illinois
Team	1	2	3	4	5	6	7	8	9	R	H	E
**Los Angeles**	0	1	0	0	0	0	0	0	0	**1**	**3**	**1**
Chicago	0	0	0	0	0	0	0	0	0	**0**	**2**	**0**
WP: Clayton Kershaw (2–0) LP: Kyle Hendricks (0–1) Sv: Kenley Jansen (3); Home runs: LAD: Adrián González (2); CHC: None; Attendance: 42,384

Game 2 of the series featured the Dodgers' Clayton Kershaw off of his Division Series heroics and the Cubs' Kyle Hendricks. Kershaw was dominant from the start, pitching a perfect four innings before giving up a single to Javier Báez. However, the Cubs could get nothing further. Hendricks also pitched well, allowing only a solo home run to Adrián González in the top of the second inning. That would be all Kershaw needed as he pitched seven scoreless innings, scattering two hits. Dodgers' closer Kenley Jansen came in the eighth to attempt a six-out save. Jansen shut down the Cubs and the Dodgers tied the series at one game apiece heading to Los Angeles. Cubs batters Addison Russell and Anthony Rizzo continued their struggles, each going 0–3 in the game. Combined, Ben Zobrist, Rizzo, and Russell were 6–60 in the playoffs. The game also marked the Cubs first 1–0 loss in the postseason since Babe Ruth and the Boston Red Sox blanked them in the 1918 World Series opener at Comiskey Park (borrowed by the Cubs because of its larger seating capacity).

==== Game 3 ====
Tuesday, October 18, 2016 7:08pm CDT at Dodger Stadium in Los Angeles, California
Team	1	2	3	4	5	6	7	8	9	R	H	E
Chicago	0	0	0	0	0	0	0	0	0	**0**	**4**	**0**
**Los Angeles**	0	0	1	2	0	1	0	2	X	**6**	**10**	**0**
WP: Rich Hill (1–0) LP: Jake Arrieta (0–1); Home runs: CHC: None; LAD: Yasmani Grandal (1), Justin Turner (1); Attendance: 54,269

As the series shifted to Los Angeles, the Cubs looked to break out of their hitting slump and sent Jake Arrieta to the mound, the Dodgers countered with Rich Hill. However, the Cubs' hitting problems continued as Hill shut them down, allowing only two hits in six innings of work. The Dodgers scored first in the third with a run-scoring single by Corey Seager. The Dodger offense also homered twice off of Arrieta: a two-run homer by Yasmani Grandal in the fourth and a solo homer by Justin Turner in the sixth. The Dodger bullpen continued where Hill left off and the Dodger offense added two more runs in the bottom of the eighth to take a 6–0 lead. Kenley Jansen pitched the final four outs give the Dodgers a two games to one lead in the series. The back-to-back shutouts were the Dodgers first ever consecutive shutouts in postseason history. The back-to-back shutouts also marked the first time the Cubs had been shutout in back-to-back games since May 27–28, 2014. The Cubs hitting slump continued as the 2-3-4-5 hitters went 3–27 in the two shutouts.

==== Game 4 ====
Wednesday, October 19, 2016 7:08pm CDT at Dodger Stadium in Los Angeles, California
Team	1	2	3	4	5	6	7	8	9	R	H	E
**Chicago**	0	0	0	4	1	5	0	0	0	**10**	**13**	**2**
Los Angeles	0	0	0	0	2	0	0	0	0	**2**	**6**	**4**
WP: Mike Montgomery (1–1) LP: Julio Urías (1–1); Home runs: CHC: Addison Russell (1), Anthony Rizzo (1); LAD: None; Attendance: 54,449

As the Cubs entered Game 4, they looked to break their two-game scoring drought. Playoff veteran John Lackey took the mound for the Cubs as the Dodgers sent Julio Urías, the youngest pitcher to start a game in postseason history. The Cubs struggles continued as Urías held the Cubs without a hit through three innings. In the bottom of the second, the Dodgers had a scoring chance denied as Adrián González was thrown out at the plate by Jason Heyward after an Andrew Toles single. In the fourth, the Cubs bats began to awaken. Ben Zobrist notched the first Cub hit of the game as he bunted to lead off. Javier Báez and Willson Contreras followed with singles to score Zobrist. The run marked the first scored by the Cubs in 21 innings. A Heyward groundout pushed home another run and left Contreras at third for Addison Russell. On an 0–2 pitch, Russell broke out of his slump with a two-run homer to put the Cubs up 4–0. Urías was lifted one batter later. In the top of the fifth, the Cubs breakout continued with Anthony Rizzo hitting a home run on a full count and pushing the lead to 5–0. Back-to-back walks to lead off the bottom of the fourth forced Lackey from the game. Reliever Mike Montgomery gave up a single to load the bases before striking out Corey Seager. A single off of Montgomery's glove by Justin Turner brought in two runs and the Dodgers closed the lead to 5–2. Montgomery retired the next two batters to end the threat. In the top of the sixth, the Cubs blew the game open. Russell singled and reached second on a throwing error. Montgomery singled, moving Russell to third. Dexter Fowler singled to score Russell. Following a Kris Bryant walk, Rizzo notched his second hit of the game as he singled to score two runs and up the lead to 8–2. Following a single by Zobrist to load the bases, Báez hit a sacrifice fly to center fielder Joc Pederson. Pederson's throw to home got by the catcher as Bryant scored and Rizzo came home on the wild throw as well ballooning the lead to 10–2. The Cub bullpen shut down the Dodgers for the remainder of the game as the series was tied at two games apiece.

==== Game 5 ====
Thursday, October 20, 2016 7:08pm CDT at Dodger Stadium in Los Angeles, California
Team	1	2	3	4	5	6	7	8	9	R	H	E
**Chicago**	1	0	0	0	0	2	0	5	0	**8**	**13**	**0**
Los Angeles	0	0	0	1	0	0	0	1	2	**4**	**9**	**1**
WP: Jon Lester (2–0) LP: Joe Blanton (0–2); Home runs: CHC: Addison Russell (2); LAD: None; Attendance: 54,449

With the series tied at two games apiece, the Cubs looked to Jon Lester to keep up his strong playoff performance. The Dodgers also went with their Game 1 starter, Kenta Maeda. The Cubs started the scoring in the first inning on a single by Dexter Fowler and an RBI double by Anthony Rizzo, but could muster nothing further in the first. The Cubs left runners on base in the first, second, fourth, and fifth innings, but could not get another run in. The Dodgers tied the game in the bottom of the fourth following a Howie Kendrick double and steal of third. Adrián González hit the ball to Rizzo who could not field it cleanly and the run scored as a result. The Dodgers lifted Maeda from the game in the fourth and turned it over to the bullpen. In the sixth, Javier Báez continued his strong postseason play by singling to start the inning. Following a strikeout of Jason Heyward, Addison Russell homered to center field to break the deadlock and put the Cubs up 3–1. After stranding two more runners in the seventh, the Cubs offense broke the game open in the eighth. Russell reached on error and pinch hitter Willson Contreras singled to put runners at first and second. Pinch hitter Albert Almora, Jr. bunted the runners over and Dexter Fowler followed with an infield singled to score the Cubs' fourth run of the game. An infield single by Kris Bryant scored Contreras and a walk by Ben Zobrist loaded the bases for Báez. Báez, as he seemed to have done all postseason, came through with a bases-clearing double to put the Cubs up 8–1. The Dodgers added a run in the bottom of the eighth off of Pedro Strop on a double by Carlos Ruiz. Cub closer Aroldis Chapman pitched the ninth and allowed a run-scoring single by Josh Reddick and a sacrifice fly by Andrew Toles to make the score 8–4. Chapman induced Justin Turner to ground out to end the game. The win put the Cubs on the brink of the World Series with a three games to two lead as the series moved back to Wrigley Field. The Cubs took advantage of the Dodgers bullpen in the series, scoring 26 runs in 26.2 innings pitched by Maeda and the Dodger bullpen.

==== Game 6 ====
Saturday, October 22, 2016 7:08 pm CDT at Wrigley Field in Chicago, Illinois
Team	1	2	3	4	5	6	7	8	9	R	H	E
Los Angeles	0	0	0	0	0	0	0	0	0	**0**	**2**	**1**
**Chicago**	2	1	0	1	1	0	0	0	X	**5**	**7**	**1**
WP: Kyle Hendricks (1–1) LP: Clayton Kershaw (2–1); Home runs: LAD: None; CHC: Willson Contreras (1), Anthony Rizzo (2); Attendance: 42,386

As the series returned to Wrigley Field, the Cubs looked to earn a trip to the World Series for the first time since 1945. The Cubs sent ERA-leader Kyle Hendricks to the mound while the Dodgers countered with Clayton Kershaw. On the first pitch of the game, Andrew Toles singled for the Dodgers and the game appeared to be off to a good start for the Dodgers. However, Corey Seager swung at the next pitch and grounded to Javier Báez who tagged Toles and threw to first to complete the double play. In the bottom of the first, the Cubs jumped out quickly on Kershaw who had blanked them in Game 2. Dexter Fowler doubled and Kris Bryant singled him home to give the Cubs a 1–0 lead. Anthony Rizzo reached on an error by Toles and, with runners at second and third, Ben Zobrist hit a sacrifice fly to extend the lead to 2–0. In the top of the second, Josh Reddick reached on an error by Báez, but Hendricks picked him off of first to end the inning. The Cubs added another run in the bottom of the second when Addison Russell doubled to left and scored on Fowler's single. In the bottom of the fourth, Willson Contreras led off the inning by homering on a line drive to left field to extend the lead to 4–0. In the fifth, Rizzo continued his hot hitting by homering to right-center field and to put the Cubs up 5–0. Kershaw was lifted after that inning, but Hendricks continued his gem on the mound, retiring the side and facing the minimum batters through seven innings. In the eighth, after a flyout by Adrián González, Reddick singled, only the second hit allowed by Hendricks. That ended the night for Hendricks as Cub manager Joe Maddon went to the bullpen and brought in closer Aroldis Chapman. Chapman induced Howie Kendrick into an inning-ending double play. In the top of the ninth, Chapman walked the second batter, but Yasiel Puig grounded into a game-ending double play as Wrigley Field erupted in celebration. The Cubs advanced to their first World Series since 1945 with the 5–0 win and the four games to two series win. In the game, the Cubs faced the minimum number of batters, 27, in a game. The only other time that had occurred in a postseason game was Don Larsen's 1956 perfect game for the Yankees. Jon Lester and Javier Báez were named co-MVPs of the NLCS.

==== Composite line score ====
2016 NLCS (4–2): Chicago Cubs defeated Los Angeles Dodgers.

Team	1	2	3	4	5	6	7	8	9	R	H	E
Los Angeles Dodgers	0	1	1	3	3	1	0	5	3	**17**	**39**	**7**
Chicago Cubs	4	3	0	5	2	7	0	10	0	**31**	**48**	**3**
Home runs: LAD: Andre Ethier (1), Adrián González (1), Yasmani Grandal (1), Justin Turner (1); CHC: Willson Contreras (1), Dexter Fowler (1), Miguel Montero (1), Anthony Rizzo (2), Addison Russell (2); Total attendance: 290,313 Average attendance: 48,386

=== World Series ===
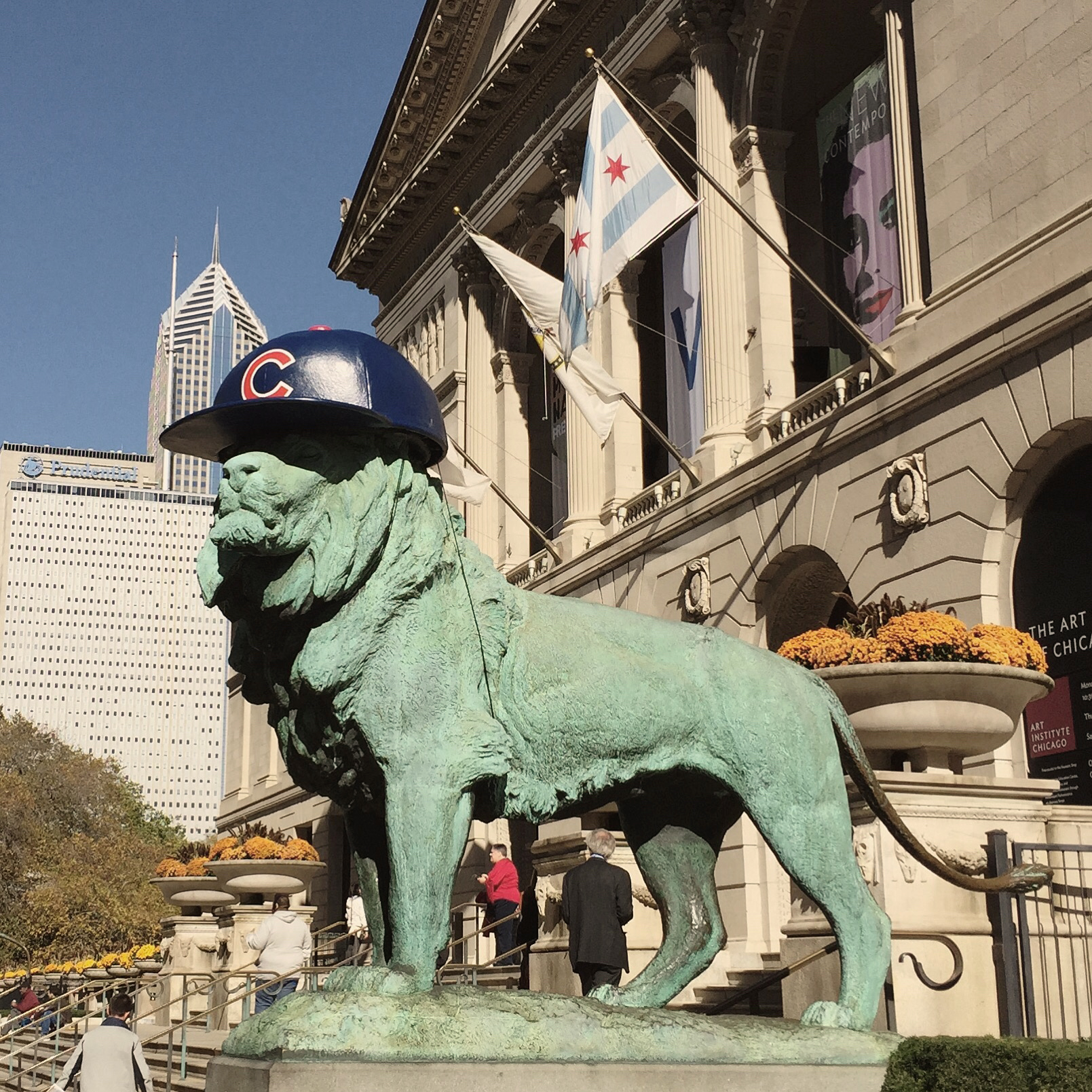
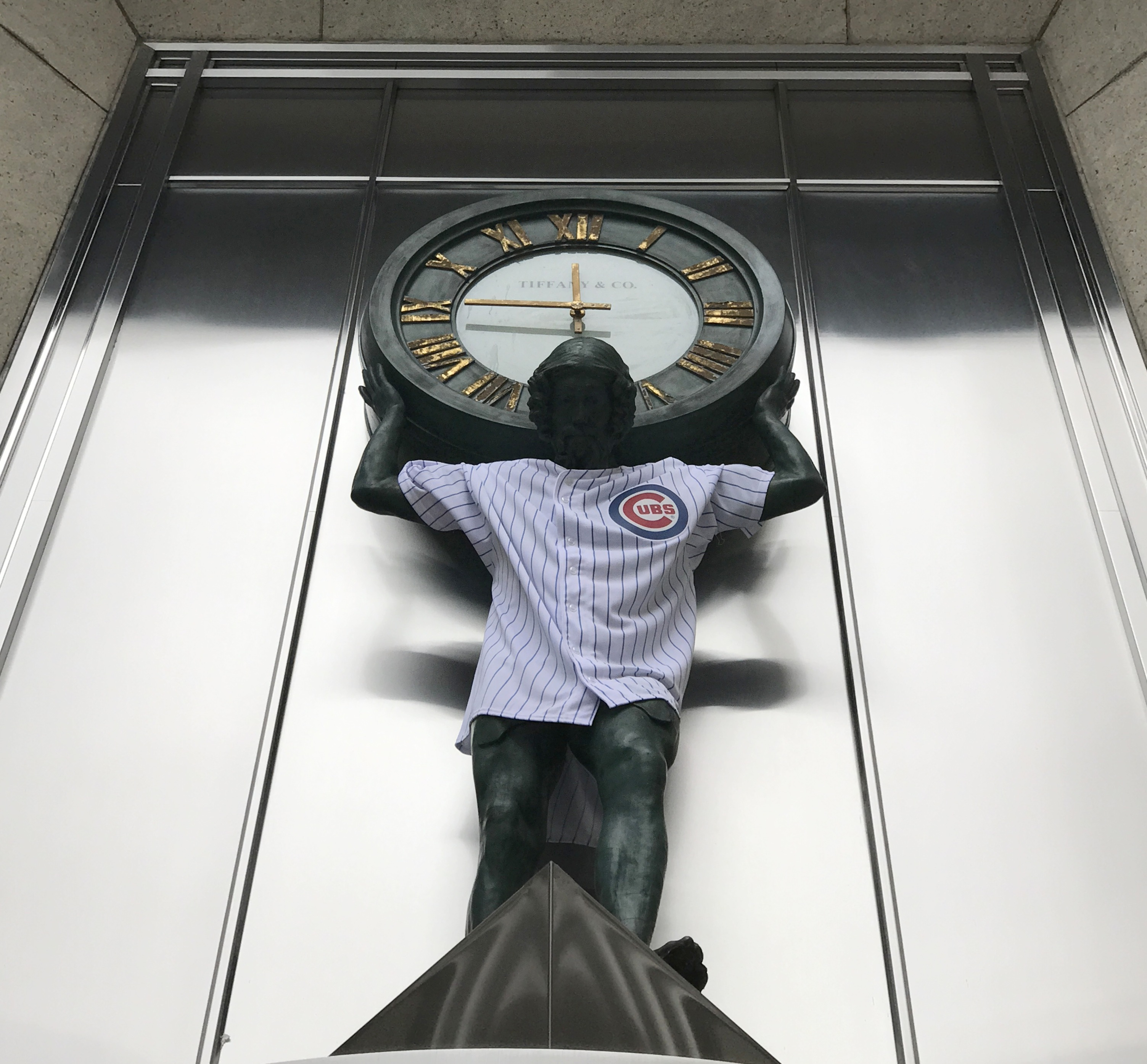
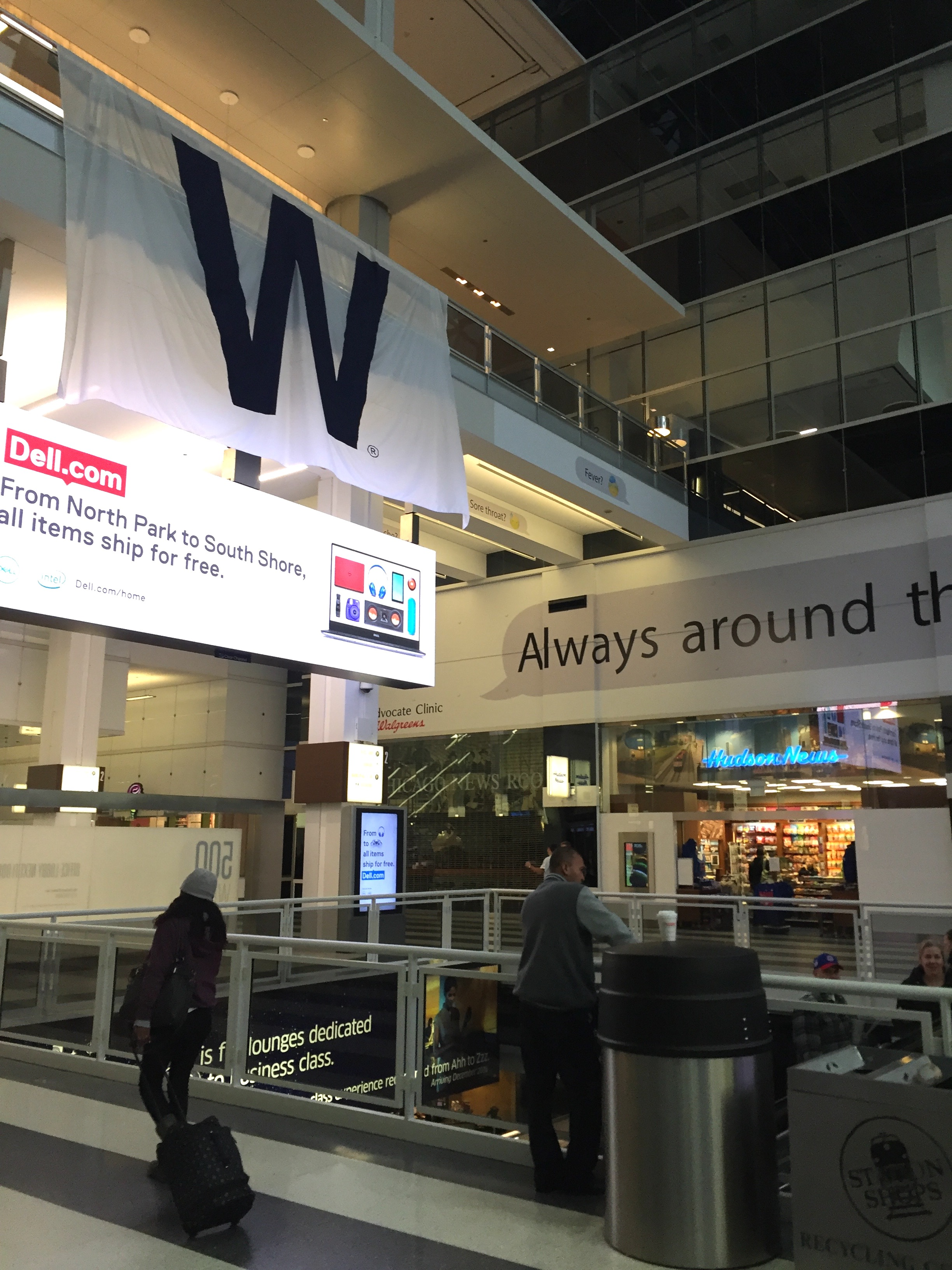
- Top: One of the two lion sculptures outside of the Art Institute of Chicago decorated in support of the Cubs
- Middle: The clock outside of the Tiffany & Co. store on Chicago’s Magnificent Mile decorated to celebrate the Cubs
- Bottom: Large Cubs Win Flag in the foyer of 500 West Madison (location of the Ogilvie Transportation Center) during the World Series

==== Game 1 ====
Tuesday, October 25, 2016 7:08 pm CDT at Progressive Field in Cleveland, Ohio
Team	1	2	3	4	5	6	7	8	9	R	H	E
Chicago Cubs	0	0	0	0	0	0	0	0	0	**0**	**7**	**0**
**Cleveland Indians**	2	0	0	1	0	0	0	3	X	**6**	**10**	**0**
WP: Corey Kluber (3–1) LP: Jon Lester (2–1); Home runs: CHC: None; CLE: Roberto Pérez 2 (2); Attendance: 38,091

To begin the historic World Series, the teams sent their number one starters to the mound in Cleveland: Corey Kluber for the Indians and Jon Lester for the Cubs. The Cubs altered their lineup a bit, batting Kyle Schwarber, making his first appearance in six months, as their DH. Things started well for Lester as he retired the first two batters he faced. However, Francisco Lindor singled and stole second with two outs. Lester then walked Mike Napoli and Carlos Santana. With the bases loaded, José Ramírez hit an infield single to drive in a run and Lester hit the next batter, Brandon Guyer, to give the Indians a 2–0 lead. Kluber started hot as well, striking out eight of the first nine batters he faced, a World Series record. In the bottom of the fourth, Roberto Pérez homered to left off of Lester increasing the lead. Kluber continued his excellent performance, striking out nine before giving up a double to Ben Zobrist in the top of the seventh which ended Kluber's night and brought Andrew Miller to the mound. Schwarber walked and Javier Baéz singled to load the bases. However, Miller induced a shallow fly ball by pinch hitter Willson Contreras and struck out Addison Russell and David Ross to end the Cub threat. With Justin Grimm pitching for the Cubs in the bottom of the eighth, the Indians put runners on first and second and Héctor Rondón gave up another home run to Pérez to put the game out of reach 6–0. The win gave the Indians a one-game lead in the series and extended Indians' manager Terry Francona's World Series winning streak to nine games.

Dexter Fowler, Addison Russell, Jason Heyward, and Carl Edwards Jr. became the first African-Americans on a Cubs roster in a World Series. Additionally, Fowler (batting as the lead-off hitter) was the first African-American to appear and to bat for the Cubs in a World Series game. Both Fowler and Russell were the first African-Americans to start for the Cubs in a World Series.

==== Game 2 ====
Wednesday, October 26, 2016 6:08 pm CDT at Progressive Field in Cleveland, Ohio
Team	1	2	3	4	5	6	7	8	9	R	H	E
**Chicago Cubs**	1	0	1	0	3	0	0	0	0	**5**	**9**	**0**
Cleveland Indians	0	0	0	0	0	1	0	0	0	**1**	**4**	**2**
WP: Jake Arrieta (1–0) LP: Trevor Bauer (0–1); Home runs: CHC: None; CLE: None; Attendance: 38,172

Looking to tie the series at one game apiece, the Cubs sent Jake Arrieta to the mound against the Indians' Trevor Bauer. The Cubs also featured six players age 24 or younger in the starting lineup, a postseason record. The Cubs started things off early as Kris Bryant singled in the first inning and Anthony Rizzo doubled to score Bryant and give the Cubs an early 1–0 lead. Arrieta started well too, retiring the first two batters before walking back-to-back batters in the bottom of the first. However, Arrieta got a strikeout to end the inning. The Cubs struck again in the third following a two-out walk by Rizzo and a single by Ben Zobrist. A single by Kyle Schwarber scored Rizzo from second and pushed the Cub lead to 2–0. Bauer was forced from the game in the fourth and the Cubs struck again in the fifth. Rizzo walked again and Zobrist tripled to plate Rizzo. Another run-scoring single by Schwarber and a bases loaded walk by Addison Russell pushed the lead to 5–0. Arrieta continued to cruise, walking three batters but holding the Indians without a hit into the sixth inning. In the sixth, a double by Jason Kipnis ended the no-hitter and a wild pitch by Arrieta two batters later scored the first Indians run. Arrieta allowed another single and was lifted for reliever Mike Montgomery. Both teams threatened in the seventh but could not score and, following a single by Mike Napoli in the bottom of the eighth, Aroldis Chapman entered to finish the game for the Cubs. The win marked the Cubs first World Series win since 1945 as they evened up the series at one game apiece.

==== Game 3 ====
Friday, October 28, 2016 7:08 pm CDT at Wrigley Field in Chicago, Illinois
Team	1	2	3	4	5	6	7	8	9	R	H	E
**Cleveland Indians**	0	0	0	0	0	0	1	0	0	**1**	**8**	**1**
Chicago Cubs	0	0	0	0	0	0	0	0	0	**0**	**5**	**0**
WP: Andrew Miller (1–0) LP: Carl Edwards Jr. (0–1) Sv: Cody Allen (1); Home runs: CLE: None; CHC: None; Attendance: 41,703

The series shifted to Wrigley Field for the first World Series game at Wrigley since 1945 and the first World Series night game at Wrigley. Josh Tomlin went to the mound for Cleveland and Kyle Hendricks for Chicago. Both pitchers pitched well, but Hendricks was in and out of trouble frequently giving up six hits, and walking two in just 4 1/3 innings. Following a single by Tyler Naquin, a bunt by Tomlin, a walk to Carlos Santana, Hendricks hit Jason Kipnis with a pitch to load the bases in the fifth. Justin Grimm relieved Hendricks and got Francsico Lindor to hit into an inning-ending double play escaping with the score still 0–0. The Cubs chased Tomlin from the game in the bottom of the fifth, but Andrew Miller replaced him and retired pinch-hitter Miguel Montero. Leading off the seventh, Roberto Pérez singled to right off reliever Carl Edwards Jr. Pinch runner Michael Martinez replaced him at first. Naquin advanced Martinez to second with a bunt and Martinez moved to third on a wild pitch by Edwards. After Rajai Davis walked, pinch-hitter Coco Crisp hit a broken bat single to right to score Martinez. Mike Montgomery replaced Edwards and escaped the inning without any further damage. In the bottom of the seventh, the Cubs threatened to tie it with a two-out triple by Jorge Soler, but Javier Báez grounded out to end the inning. In the ninth, the Cubs again threatened to tie it, putting runners on second and third following singles by Anthony Rizzo and Jason Heyward. However, with two outs, Báez struck out swinging to end the game. The win gave the Indians a 2–1 lead in the series. Cody Allen earned his sixth save of the postseason.

==== Game 4 ====
Saturday, October 29, 2016 7:08 pm CDT at Wrigley Field in Chicago, Illinois
Team	1	2	3	4	5	6	7	8	9	R	H	E
**Cleveland Indians**	0	2	1	0	0	1	3	0	0	**7**	**10**	**0**
Chicago Cubs	1	0	0	0	0	0	0	1	0	**2**	**7**	**2**
WP: Corey Kluber (2–0) LP: John Lackey (0–1); Home runs: CLE: Carlos Santana (1); Jason Kipnis (1); CHC: Dexter Fowler (1); Attendance: 41,706

With the series lead, the Indians sent Corey Kluber to the mound on short rest against John Lackey to try to extend the series lead to three games to one. The Cubs opened the scoring in the first inning with a double by lead-off man Dexter Fowler and a run-scoring single by Anthony Rizzo. However, the Indians quickly answered in the top of the second as Carlos Santanta homered to tie it. Following an error by Kris Bryant and an intentional walk of Tyler Naquin, Kluber singled home the go-ahead run giving the Indians the 2–1 lead. The Indians added another run in the third when Francisco Lindor singled home Jason Kipnis to increase the lead to 3–1. Kluber continued to shut down the Cubs as he did in Game 1. Lackey was lifted after five innings, but reliever Mike Montgomery gave up another run in the sixth as the Indians lead moved to 4–1. Cleveland put the game away in the seventh on a three-run homer by Kipnis off of Travis Wood, pushing the lead to 7–1. Fowler hit a consolation eighth inning solo home run off of reliever Andrew Miller, but that was it as the Cubs lost 7–2 and fell behind in the series three games to one.

==== Game 5 ====
October 30, 2016 7:15 pm CDT at Wrigley Field in Chicago, Illinois
Team	1	2	3	4	5	6	7	8	9	R	H	E
Cleveland Indians	0	1	0	0	0	1	0	0	0	**2**	**6**	**1**
**Chicago Cubs**	0	0	0	3	0	0	0	0	X	**3**	**7**	**0**
WP: Jon Lester (1–1) LP: Trevor Bauer (0–2) Sv: Aroldis Chapman (1); Home runs: CLE: José Ramírez (1); CHC: Kris Bryant (1); Attendance: 41,711

Facing elimination and the last game at Wrigley Field for the season, the Cubs sent ace Jon Lester to the mound while the Indians countered with Trevor Bauer. Lester surrendered a second inning homer to José Ramírez as the Cubs fell behind 1–0. However, Kris Bryant answered in the fourth, homering to left to lead off the inning. Anthony Rizzo doubled following Bryant's homer and Ben Zobrist singled. Addison Russell followed with an infield single to score Rizzo and put the Cubs up 2–1. Following a Jason Heyward strikeout, Javier Báez singled on a bunt to load the bases with one out. David Ross hit a sacrifice fly to score Zobrist, but Lester struck out to end the inning. Bauer was removed from the game after pitching four innings, but the Cubs could do no further damage. Leading 3–1, Lester allowed a run in the sixth following a single and stolen base by Rajai Davis and a Francisco Lindor single. Lester was lifted with the 3–2 lead after six innings. Carl Edwards Jr. replaced Lester in the seventh and gave up a single. Following a flyout, Cub manager Joe Maddon went to closer Aroldis Chapman for an eight-out save. Chapman closed out the seventh and gave up a single to Davis in the eighth. Davis stole second and third, but Chapman stranded him there. In the ninth, Chapman retired the side, striking out Ramírez to end the game and extend the series to a Game 6 in Cleveland.

==== Game 6 ====
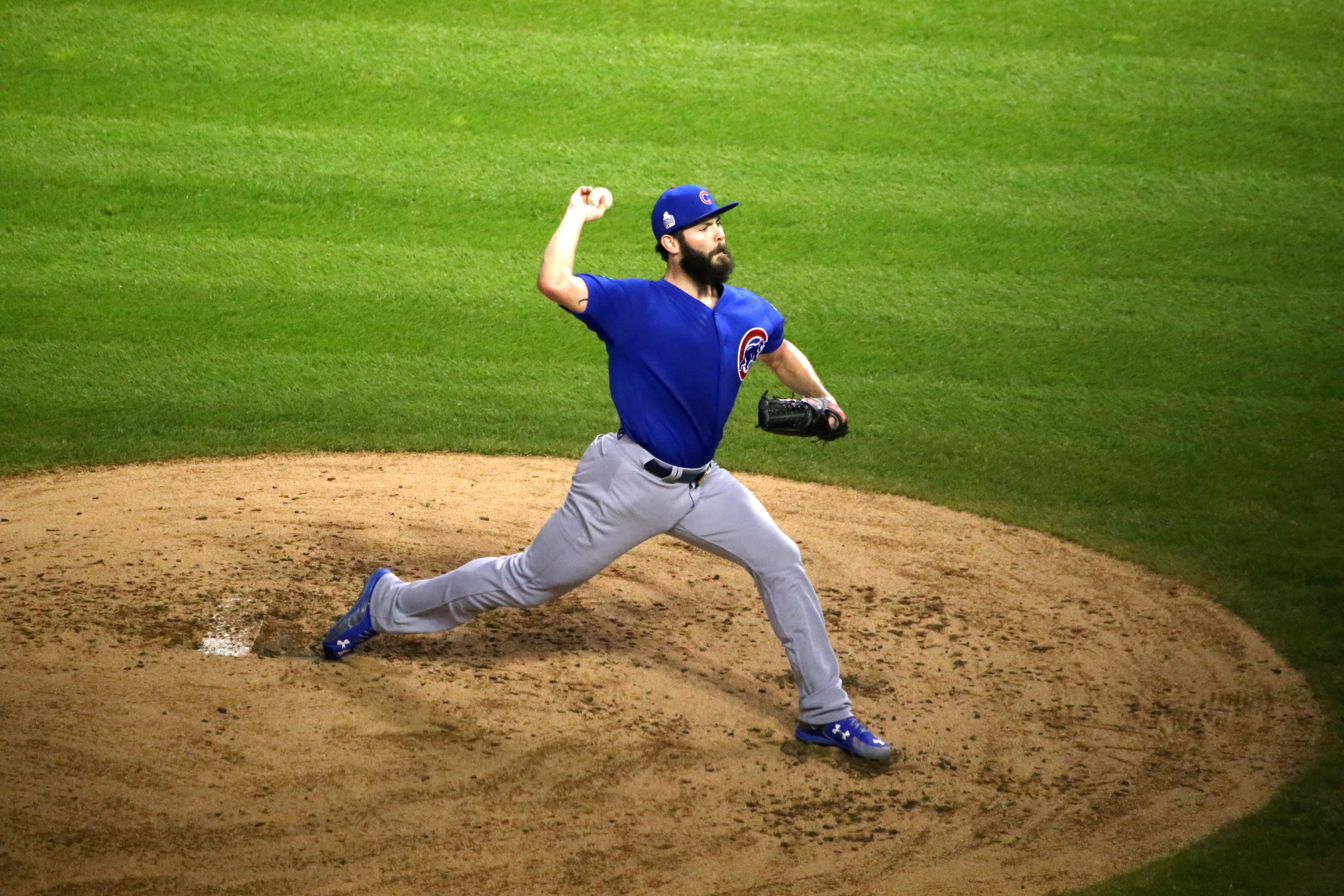
Jake Arrieta was the starting pitcher in Game 6

November 1, 2016 7:08 pm CDT at Progressive Field in Cleveland, Ohio
Team	1	2	3	4	5	6	7	8	9	R	H	E
**Chicago Cubs**	3	0	4	0	0	0	0	0	2	**9**	**13**	**0**
Cleveland Indians	0	0	0	1	1	0	0	0	1	**3**	**6**	**1**
WP: Jake Arrieta (2–0) LP: Josh Tomlin (1–1); Home runs: CHI: Kris Bryant (2), Addison Russell (1), Anthony Rizzo (1); CLE: Jason Kipnis (2); Attendance: 38,116

The series returned to Cleveland with the Cubs looking to force a seventh game while the Indians looked to win the series. Cubs starter Jake Arrieta took the mound for the Cubs while Josh Tomlin took the hill for the Indians. The game started well for the Indians as Tomlin retired the first two batters easily and moved to an 0–2 count on Kris Bryant. However, Bryant drove Tomlin's next pitch over the left field wall to give the Cubs an early 1–0 lead. Anthony Rizzo followed the homer with a single and Ben Zobrist singled to move Rizzo to third. Addison Russell hit a fly ball to right-center that looked to end the inning, but ended up falling between the Indians outfielders and scored Rizzo. Zobrist also scored on the play knocking over Indians catcher Roberto Pérez to give the Cubs an early 3–0 lead. Arrieta cruised through the first two innings for the Cubs. In the third, Kyle Schwarber led off the inning with a walk. Bryant flied out and Rizzo singled. Zobrist singled again to load the bases and chase Tomlin from the game. Dan Otero, replacing Tomlin, pushed Russell to a 2–0 count before Russell belted a homer to deep left-center field for a grand slam. The Cubs lead ballooned to 7–0 and a seventh game seemed likely. In the fifth, Arrieta allowed a double to Jason Kipnis and he scored on a Mike Napoli single to reduce the lead by one. In the fifth, Kipnis further reduced the lead with a solo home run to left putting the Cubs up 7–2. Following a walk by Arrieta in the sixth, Mike Montgomery replaced him on the mound to induce a groundout to end the inning. In the seventh, Montgomery walked Pérez and gave up a Kipnis single with two outs. Cubs manager Joe Maddon again called on Cub closer Aroldis Chapman and he induced a groundout by Francisco Lindor to end the inning. Chapman gave up a single in the eighth, but got a double play to end the inning. In the ninth, with two outs, Bryant singled for his fourth hit of the game. Rizzo homered to push the Cub lead back to seven at 9–2. On the verge of pushing the series to a seventh game, Chapman walked the first batter and was replaced by Pedro Strop. After giving up a run-scoring single to Pérez and walking Carlos Santana, Travis Wood entered to get the final out and force a game seven in the series.

==== Game 7 ====
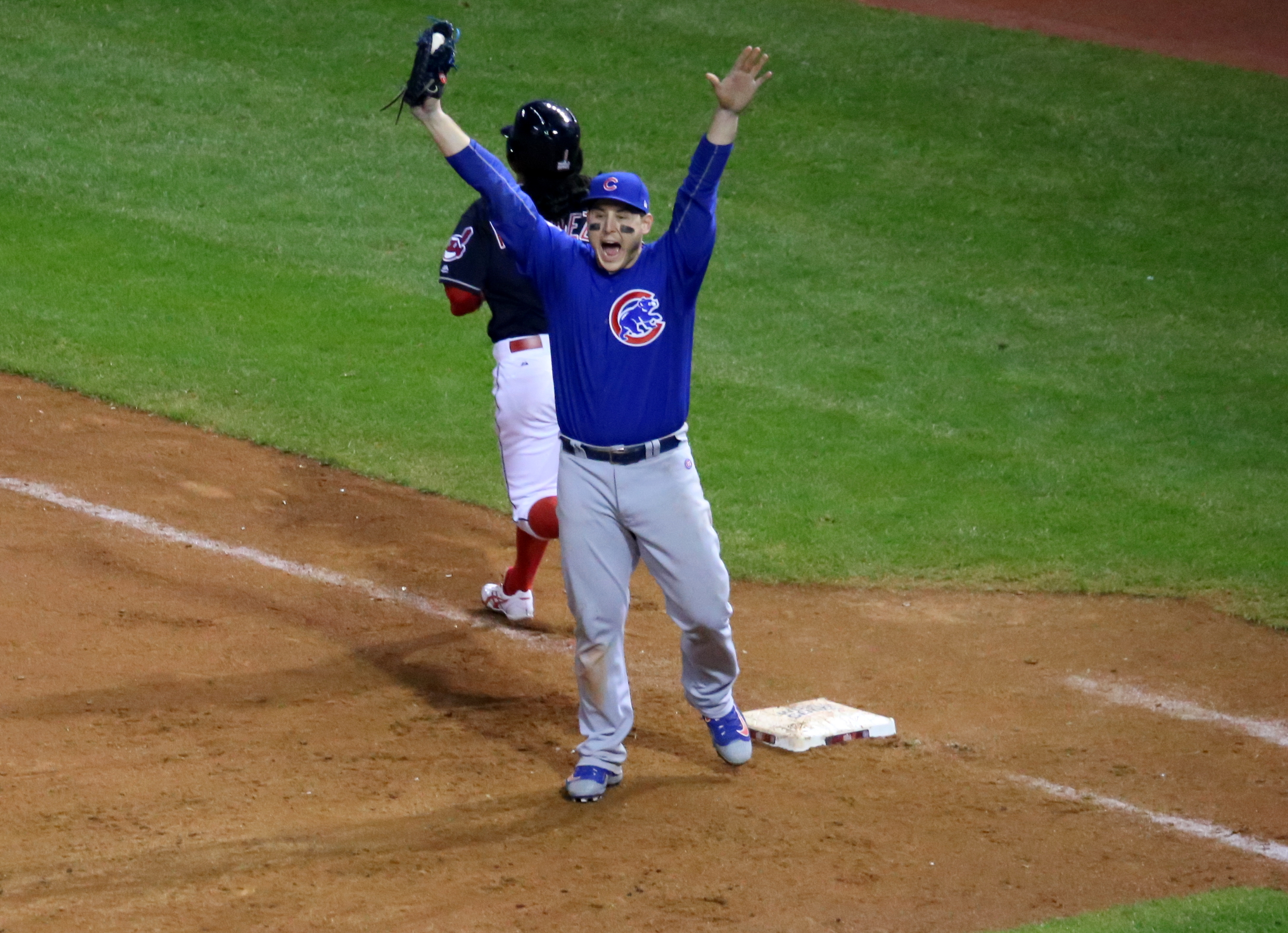
Anthony Rizzo after catching the final out of the World Series

November 2, 2016 8:00 pm (EDT) at Progressive Field in Cleveland, Ohio
Team	1	2	3	4	5	6	7	8	9	10	R	H	E
**Chicago Cubs**	1	0	0	2	2	1	0	0	0	2	**8**	**13**	**3**
Cleveland Indians	0	0	1	0	2	0	0	3	0	1	**7**	**11**	**1**
WP: Aroldis Chapman (1–0) LP: Bryan Shaw (0–1) Sv: Mike Montgomery (1); Home runs: CHC: Dexter Fowler (2), Javier Báez (1), David Ross (1); CLE: Rajai Davis (1); Attendance: 38,104

Cubs storming the field moments after winning Game 7

With the series tied at three games apiece, the Cubs sent regular season ERA leader Kyle Hendricks to the mound. The Indians countered with Corey Kluber, winner of Games 1 and 4. Things started well for the Cubs as Dexter Fowler led off the game with a home run to straight away center to give the Cubs an early 1–0 lead. Hendricks held the Indians scoreless until the third when Coco Crisp doubled, was moved to third on a sacrifice bunt by Roberto Pérez, and scored on a single by Carlos Santana. The Cubs jumped back out in front in the fourth when Kris Bryant singled, Anthony Rizzo was hit by a pitch, and Ben Zobrist forced Rizzo at second. Addison Russell hit a shallow fly ball to left field which allowed Bryant to tag and score to put the Cubs up 2–1. Willson Contreras followed the sacrifice fly with a double to right-center field to score Zobrist and the Cubs were up 3–1. The lead increased in the fifth when Javier Báez homered on the first pitch of the inning to drive Kluber from the game. Andrew Miller, who had dominated the postseason, entered the game. Following a single by Fowler, Kyle Schwarber grounded in to a double play and Miller looked to have escaped the inning. But, Bryant coaxed a walk on a nine-pitch at bat and scored from first on a single to right by Rizzo to make the lead 5–1. Hendricks, who had seemingly settled down, got the first two outs in the bottom of the fifth, but walked Santana. Cub manager Joe Maddon pulled Hendricks to be replaced by Games 1 and 5 starter, Jon Lester. Lester allowed a dribbler in front of the plate by Jason Kipnis, but David Ross, who had entered the game with Lester and was playing in his final major league game, threw wildly to first allowing runners to advance to second and third. Lester uncorked a wild pitch that bounced off Ross's mask and scored both runners, tightening the lead to 5–3. Ross partially atoned for the error in the sixth with a homer to center field to bring the lead to 6–3. Lester allowed runners in the sixth and the seventh, but held the Indians without a run. In the eighth, after retiring the first two batters, Lester allowed a single up the middle to José Ramírez. Maddon had seen enough and brought Aroldis Chapman, pitching in his third straight game, into the contest. Brandon Guyer promptly doubled to score Ramirez and reduce the lead to two. Rajai Davis then stunned the Cubs by homering to left to tie the game at six. In the ninth, Ross walked and was pinch run for by Chris Coghlan. Jason Heyward grounded into a force play, but then stole second and advanced on a bad throw by Yan Gomes. With two strikes, Báez attempted to bunt, but fouled out. Fowler grounded out to end the threat. Surprisingly, Chapman returned to the mound in the ninth and retired the Indians in order to force extra innings.

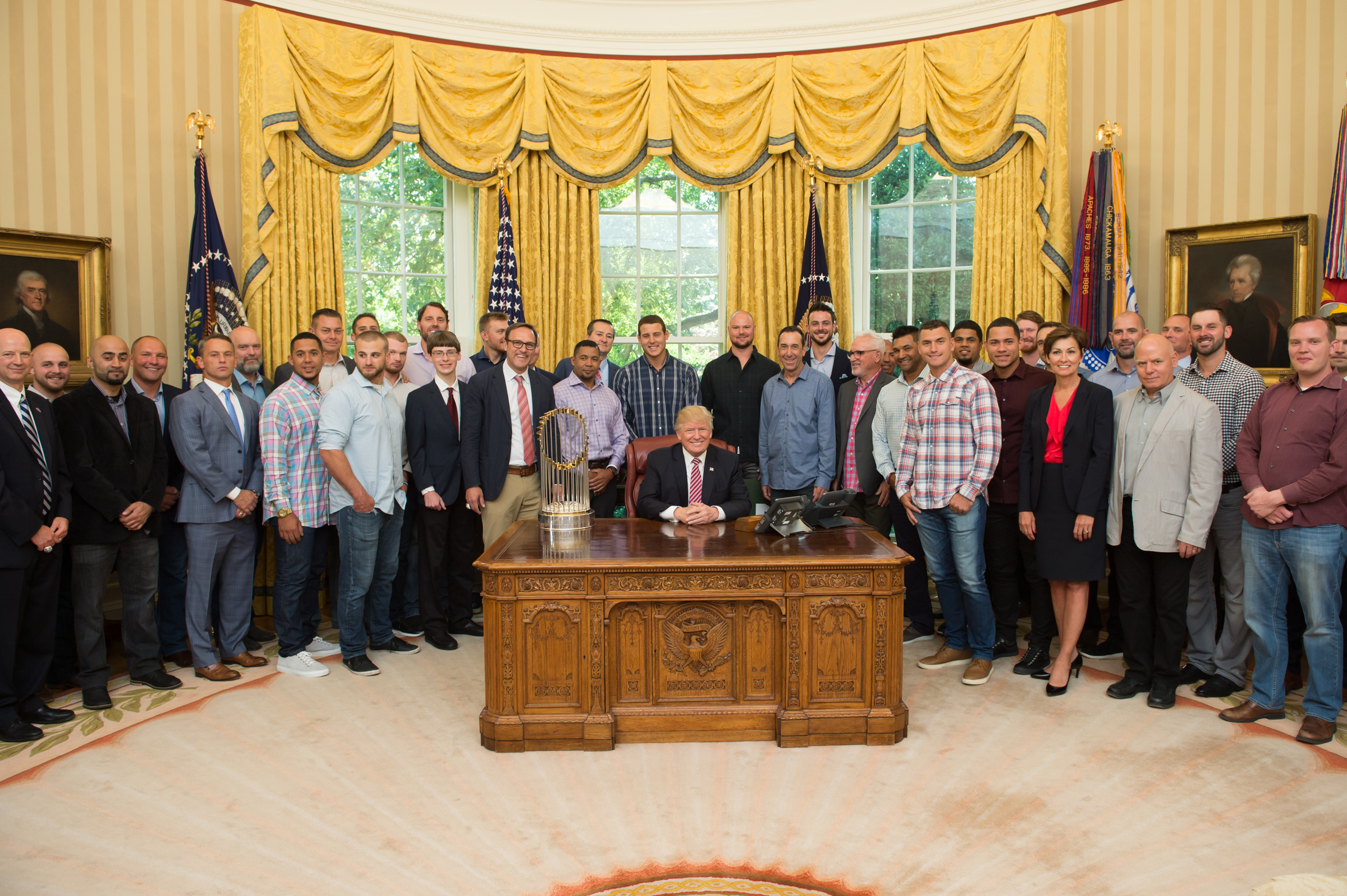
The Cubs at the White House with President Trump honoring their World Series win

However, before the tenth inning could start, rain delayed the game for 17 minutes. During this rain delay, Heyward called a player's meeting in the visiting clubhouse's weight room to rally the team. Schwarber singled upon resumption of play and was pinch run for by Albert Almora Jr. Almora advanced to second on a flyout to the warning track by Bryant and the Indians chose to walk Rizzo to face Zobrist. Zobrist responded by doubling down the left field line off Bryan Shaw to score Almora. Shaw then intentionally walked Russell to load the bases. Miguel Montero, in the game after Ross was lifted for a pinch runner, scored Rizzo on a single up the middle to move the lead to 8–6. Game 2 and 5 starter Trevor Bauer then retired Heyward and Báez to end the inning. Carl Edwards, Jr. was called on by Maddon to end the Cubs World Series drought in the bottom of the tenth. Edwards retired the first two batters with ease, but walked Guyer. Davis followed up his game-tying homer by singling to score Guyer and reduce the lead to one. With the Indians out of position players, Michael Martínez, who had entered the game as a defensive replacement, came to the plate with two outs. Maddon countered with Mike Montgomery. On the second pitch by Montgomery, Martínez hit a soft grounder to Bryant who threw to Rizzo at first to end the game and the World Series. The win broke the Cubs' 108-year World Series drought. Zobrist, who batted .357 in the series and led all players with 10 hits, was named World Series MVP. Many baseball sources have called this game "one of the greatest Game 7s ever played."

==== Composite line score ====
2016 World Series (4-3): Chicago Cubs beat Cleveland Indians.

Team	1	2	3	4	5	6	7	8	9	10	R	H	E
Chicago Cubs	6	0	5	5	5	1	0	1	2	2	**27**	**61**	**5**
Cleveland Indians	2	3	2	2	3	3	4	6	1	1	**27**	**55**	**6**
Home runs: CHC: Kris Bryant (2), Dexter Fowler (2), Addison Russell (1), Anthony Rizzo (1), Javier Báez (1), David Ross (1); CLE: Roberto Pérez (2), Jason Kipnis (2), Carlos Santana (1), José Ramírez (1), Rajai Davis (1); Total attendance: 239,499 Average attendance: 39,917; Winning player's share: $368,871.59 Losing player's share: $261,804.65

=== Postseason rosters ===
Playoff rosters
National League Division Series

- Pitchers: 6 Carl Edwards Jr. 28 Kyle Hendricks 34 Jon Lester 37 Travis Wood 38 Mike Montgomery 41 John Lackey 46 Pedro Strop 49 Jake Arrieta 52 Justin Grimm 54 Aroldis Chapman 56 Héctor Rondón
- Catchers: 3 David Ross 40 Willson Contreras 47 Miguel Montero
- Infielders: 2 Tommy La Stella 9 Javier Báez 17 Kris Bryant 18 Ben Zobrist 27 Addison Russell 44 Anthony Rizzo
- Outfielders: 5 Albert Almora 8 Chris Coghlan 22 Jason Heyward 24 Dexter Fowler 68 Jorge Soler

National League Championship Series

- Pitchers: 6 Carl Edwards Jr. 28 Kyle Hendricks 29 Rob Zastryzny 34 Jon Lester 37 Travis Wood 38 Mike Montgomery 41 John Lackey 46 Pedro Strop 49 Jake Arrieta 52 Justin Grimm 54 Aroldis Chapman 56 Héctor Rondón
- Catchers: 3 David Ross 40 Willson Contreras 47 Miguel Montero
- Infielders: 9 Javier Báez 17 Kris Bryant 18 Ben Zobrist 27 Addison Russell 44 Anthony Rizzo
- Outfielders: 5 Albert Almora 8 Chris Coghlan 22 Jason Heyward 24 Dexter Fowler 68 Jorge Soler

World Series

- Pitchers: 6 Carl Edwards Jr. 28 Kyle Hendricks 34 Jon Lester 37 Travis Wood 38 Mike Montgomery 41 John Lackey 46 Pedro Strop 49 Jake Arrieta 52 Justin Grimm 54 Aroldis Chapman 56 Héctor Rondón
- Catchers: 3 David Ross 40 Willson Contreras 47 Miguel Montero
- Infielders: 9 Javier Báez 17 Kris Bryant 18 Ben Zobrist 27 Addison Russell 44 Anthony Rizzo
- Outfielders: 5 Albert Almora 8 Chris Coghlan 12 Kyle Schwarber 22 Jason Heyward 24 Dexter Fowler 68 Jorge Soler

N.B.: Tommy La Stella had been on the roster for the 2016 National League Division Series, but was replaced by Rob Zastryzny for the 2016 National League Championship Series. Zastryzny was replaced by Kyle Schwarber on the roster for the 2016 World Series.

=== Attendance ===
Attendance	Rank
3,232,420	5

== Regular season statistics ==
= Indicates team leader

=== Batting ===
(final regular season stats)

Note: G = Games played; AB = At bats; R = Runs; H = Hits; 2B = Doubles; 3B = Triples; HR = Home runs; RBI = Runs batted in; Avg. = Batting average; OBP = On-base percentage; SLG = Slugging percentage; SB = Stolen bases

Player	G	AB	R	H	2B	3B	HR	RBI	AVG	OBP	SLG	SB
Albert Almora, Jr.	47	112	14	31	9	1	3	14	.277	.308	.455	0
Jake Arrieta	31	65	7	17	2	1	2	7	.262	.304	.415	0
Javier Báez	142	421	50	115	19	1	14	59	.273	.314	.423	12
Kris Bryant	155	603	121	176	35	3	39	102	.292	.385	.554	8
Jake Buchanan	2	1	0	0	0	0	0	0	.000	.000	.000	0
Trevor Cahill	51	8	1	1	0	0	0	0	.125	.222	.125	0
Jeimer Candelario	5	11	0	1	0	0	0	0	.091	.286	.091	0
Chris Coghlan	48	103	21	26	7	2	1	16	.252	.391	.388	0
Willson Contreras	76	252	33	71	14	1	12	35	.282	.357	.488	2
Carl Edwards Jr.	37	1	0	0	0	0	0	0	.000	.000	.000	0
Tim Federowicz	17	31	3	6	2	0	0	3	.194	.212	.258	0
Dexter Fowler	125	456	84	126	25	7	13	48	.276	.393	.447	13
Jason Hammel	35	65	6	16	3	0	0	7	.246	.258	.292	0
Kyle Hendricks	32	58	1	8	0	0	0	2	.138	.167	.138	0
Jason Heyward	142	530	61	122	27	1	7	49	.230	.306	.325	11
Ryan Kalish	7	7	1	2	0	0	0	2	.286	.444	.286	0
Munenori Kawasaki	14	21	3	7	2	0	0	1	.333	.462	.429	2
Tommy La Stella	74	148	17	40	12	1	2	11	.270	.357	.405	0
John Lackey	29	63	1	6	2	0	0	2	.095	.123	.127	0
Jon Lester	33	59	3	6	3	0	0	6	.102	.185	.153	0
Miguel Montero	86	241	33	52	8	1	8	33	.216	.327	.357	0
Mike Montgomery	17	11	2	1	0	0	0	1	.091	.091	.091	0
Spencer Patton	16	2	0	0	0	0	0	0	.000	.000	.000	0
Joel Peralta	5	1	0	0	0	0	0	0	.000	.000	.000	0
Clayton Richard	26	1	0	0	0	0	0	0	.000	.000	.000	0
Anthony Rizzo	155	583	94	170	43	4	32	109	.292	.385	.544	3
Héctor Rondón	54	1	0	0	0	0	0	0	.000	.000	.000	0
David Ross	67	166	24	38	6	0	10	32	.229	.338	.446	0
Addison Russell	151	525	67	125	25	3	21	95	.238	.321	.417	5
Kyle Schwarber	2	4	0	0	0	0	0	0	.000	.200	.000	0
Jorge Soler	86	227	37	54	9	0	12	31	.238	.333	.436	0
Pedro Strop	55	1	0	0	0	0	0	0	.000	.000	.000	0
Matt Szczur	107	185	30	48	9	1	5	24	.259	.312	.400	2
Adam Warren	29	3	0	0	0	0	0	0	.000	.000	.000	0
Travis Wood	81	11	0	2	0	0	0	1	.182	.250	.182	0
Rob Zastryzny	8	3	0	0	0	0	0	0	.000	.000	.000	0
Ben Zobrist	147	523	94	142	31	3	18	76	.272	.386	.446	6
Team totals	162	5503	808	1409	293	30	199	767	.256	.343	.429	66

=== Pitching ===
(final regular season stats)

Note: W = Wins; L = Losses; ERA = Earned run average; G = Games pitched; GS = Games started; SV = Saves; IP = Innings pitched; H = Hits allowed; R = Runs allowed; ER = Earned runs allowed; BB = Walks allowed; K = Strikeouts

Player	W	L	ERA	G	GS	SV	IP	H	R	ER	BB	K
Jake Arrieta	18	8	3.10	31	31	0	197.1	138	72	68	76	190
Jake Buchanan	1	0	1.50	2	1	0	6.0	3	1	1	1	4
Trevor Cahill	4	4	2.74	50	1	0	65.2	49	22	20	35	66
Aroldis Chapman	1	1	1.01	28	0	14	26.2	12	4	3	10	46
Gerardo Concepción	0	0	3.86	3	0	0	2.1	2	1	1	1	2
Carl Edwards, Jr.	0	1	3.75	36	0	2	36.0	15	15	15	14	52
Justin Grimm	2	1	4.10	68	0	0	52.2	47	24	24	23	65
Jason Hammel	15	10	3.83	30	30	0	166.2	148	77	71	53	144
Kyle Hendricks	16	8	2.13	31	30	0	190.0	142	53	45	44	170
John Lackey	11	8	3.35	29	29	0	188.1	146	74	70	53	180
Jon Lester	19	5	2.44	32	32	0	202.2	154	57	55	52	197
Brian Matusz	0	0	18.00	1	1	0	3.0	6	6	6	2	2
Miguel Montero	0	0	6.75	1	0	0	1.1	4	1	1	0	0
Mike Montgomery	1	1	2.82	17	5	0	38.1	30	15	12	20	38
Joe Nathan	1	0	0.00	3	0	0	2.0	2	0	0	2	4
Spencer Patton	1	1	5.48	16	0	0	21.1	20	16	13	14	22
Félix Peña	0	0	4.00	11	0	1	9.0	5	4	4	3	13
Joel Peralta	0	1	9.00	5	0	0	4.0	6	5	4	1	5
Neil Ramirez	0	0	4.70	8	0	0	7.2	5	4	4	8	10
Clayton Richard	0	1	6.43	25	0	0	14.0	23	14	10	7	7
Héctor Rondón	2	3	3.53	54	0	18	51.0	42	20	20	8	58
Joe Smith	1	1	2.51	16	0	0	14.1	11	4	4	5	15
Pedro Strop	2	2	2.84	54	0	0	47.1	27	16	15	15	60
Adam Warren	3	2	5.91	29	1	0	35.0	31	24	23	19	27
Travis Wood	4	0	2.95	77	0	0	61.0	45	24	20	24	47
Rob Zastryzny	1	0	1.13	8	1	0	16.0	12	3	2	5	17
Team totals	103	58	3.15	162	162	38	1459.2	1125	556	511	495	1441

== Postseason statistics ==
=== Batting ===
(final postseason statistics)

Note: G = Games played; AB = At bats; R = Runs; H = Hits; 2B = Doubles; 3B = Triples; HR = Home runs; RBI = Runs batted in; Avg. = Batting average; OBP = On-base percentage; SLG = Slugging percentage; SB = Stolen bases

Player	G	AB	R	H	2B	3B	HR	RBI	AVG	OBP	SLG	SB
Albert Almora, Jr.	9	10	1	0	0	0	0	0	.000	.000	.000	0
Jake Arrieta	4	5	1	1	0	0	1	3	.200	.200	.800	0
Javier Baez	17	68	8	18	4	0	2	8	.265	.282	.412	2
Kris Bryant	17	65	11	20	5	0	3	8	.308	.400	.523	1
Chris Coghlan	9	7	1	0	0	0	0	0	.000	.125	.000	0
Willson Contreras	17	39	4	10	2	0	1	5	.256	.326	.385	0
Dexter Fowler	17	72	11	18	5	0	3	6	.250	.280	.444	1
Kyle Hendricks	5	6	0	1	0	0	0	2	.167	.167	.167	0
Jason Heyward	16	48	4	5	1	1	0	1	.104	.140	.167	4
Tommy La Stella	1	1	0	0	0	0	0	0	.000	.000	.000	0
John Lackey	3	4	0	0	0	0	0	0	.000	.000	.000	0
Jon Lester	6	7	0	0	0	0	0	0	.000	.000	.000	0
Miguel Montero	9	12	1	2	0	0	1	5	.167	.167	.417	0
Mike Montgomery	11	2	1	1	0	0	0	0	.500	.500	.500	0
Anthony Rizzo	17	65	11	18	5	0	3	10	.277	.373	.492	2
David Ross	8	16	2	4	1	0	2	4	.250	.300	.688	0
Addison Russell	17	64	7	13	2	0	3	13	.203	.235	.375	0
Kyle Schwarber	5	17	2	7	1	0	0	2	.412	.500	.471	1
Jorge Soler	8	13	0	2	0	1	0	0	.154	.313	.308	0
Travis Wood	9	1	1	1	0	0	1	1	1.000	1.000	4.000	0
Ben Zobrist	17	64	9	16	5	1	0	5	.250	.319	.359	0

=== Pitching ===
(final postseason statistics)

Note: W = Wins; L = Losses; ERA = Earned run average; G = Games pitched; GS = Games started; SV = Saves; IP = Innings pitched; H = Hits allowed; R = Runs allowed; ER = Earned runs allowed; BB = Walks allowed; K = Strikeouts

Player	W	L	ERA	G	GS	SV	IP	H	R	ER	BB	K
Jake Arrieta	2	1	3.63	4	4	0	22.1	17	9	9	7	25
Aroldis Chapman	2	0	3.45	13	0	4	15.2	11	6	6	6	21
Carl Edwards, Jr.	0	0	2.84	8	0	0	6.1	5	2	2	4	4
Justin Grimm	0	0	12.46	6	0	0	4.1	6	6	6	1	3
Kyle Hendricks	1	1	1.42	5	5	0	25.1	19	5	4	7	19
John Lackey	0	0	4.85	3	3	0	13.0	14	8	7	6	12
Jon Lester	3	1	2.02	6	5	0	35.2	27	9	8	6	30
Mike Montgomery	1	1	3.14	11	0	1	14.1	14	5	5	7	11
Héctor Rondón	0	0	4.50	7	0	0	6.0	8	3	3	1	5
Pedro Strop	0	0	3.18	8	0	0	5.2	4	2	2	2	3
Travis Wood	1	0	2.84	9	0	0	6.1	5	2	2	2	7

== Awards and honors ==
Baseball America Organization of the Year

- Chicago Cubs

Sporting News Executive of the Year Award

- Theo Epstein

Most Valuable Player Award

- Kris Bryant

Rawlings Gold Glove Award

- Jason Heyward
- Anthony Rizzo

Rawlings Platinum Glove Award

- Anthony Rizzo

Silver Slugger Award

- Jake Arrieta
- Anthony Rizzo

Hank Aaron Award

- Kris Bryant

World Series Most Valuable Player Award

- Ben Zobrist

National League Championship Series - Most Valuable Player Award

- Javier Baez (co-MVP)
- Jon Lester (co-MVP)

Major League Baseball All-Star Game

- Jake Arrieta
- Kris Bryant
- Dexter Fowler
- Jon Lester
- Anthony Rizzo
- Addison Russell
- Ben Zobrist

== Farm system ==
Level	Team	League	Manager
AAA	Iowa Cubs	Pacific Coast League	Marty Pevey
AA	Tennessee Smokies	Southern League	Buddy Bailey
A	Myrtle Beach Pelicans	Carolina League	Mark Johnson
A	South Bend Cubs	Midwest League	Jimmy Gonzalez
A-Short Season	Eugene Emeralds	Northwest League	Pat Murphy
Rookie	AZL Cubs	Arizona League	Ricardo Medina
Rookie	VSL Cubs	Venezuelan Summer League	Pedro Gonzalez
Rookie	DSL Cubs	Dominican Summer League	Juan Cabreja

== Notes ==
The Cubs tied Pittsburgh 1-1 in a six inning game called due to rain on September 29. The game is often omitted from their final regular season standings which should be shown as 103-58-1. The game did not become a suspended game because it occurred so late in the season that its outcome would not have affected either team's situation for postseason play, the Cubs already having clinched home field advantage throughout.

To celebrate their 100 years at Wrigley, the Cubs wore a patch on their home uniforms and wore 1916 throwback uniforms on July 6.
