= 2016 Atlanta Braves season =

2016 Atlanta Braves
- League: National League
- Division: East
- Ballpark: Turner Field
- City: Atlanta, Georgia
- Record: 68–93 (.422)
- Divisional place: 5th
- Owners: Liberty Media/John Malone
- General managers: John Coppolella
- Managers: Fredi González; Brian Snitker
- Television: Fox Sports Southeast; Fox Sports South (Chip Caray, Joe Simpson, Tom Glavine, Dale Murphy)
- Radio: WCNN; WNNX; Atlanta Braves Radio Network (Jim Powell, Don Sutton, Mark Lemke)

The 2016 Atlanta Braves season was the Braves' 20th and last season of home games at Turner Field before moving to SunTrust Park, 51st season in Atlanta and 146th season overall. The Braves improve on their 67–95 record from 2015, but finished in last place in the National League East.

The Braves played 22 extra-inning games during the season, the most of any MLB team in 2016.

== Season standings ==
=== National League East ===
NL East
Team	W	L	Pct.	GB	Home	Road
Washington Nationals	95	67	.586	—	50‍–‍31	45‍–‍36
New York Mets	87	75	.537	8	44‍–‍37	43‍–‍38
Miami Marlins	79	82	.491	15½	40‍–‍40	39‍–‍42
Philadelphia Phillies	71	91	.438	24	37‍–‍44	34‍–‍47
Atlanta Braves	68	93	.422	26½	31‍–‍50	37‍–‍43

=== National League Wild Card ===
Division leaders
Team	W	L	Pct.
Chicago Cubs	103	58	.640
Washington Nationals	95	67	.586
Los Angeles Dodgers	91	71	.562

Wild Card teams (Top 2 teams qualify for postseason)
Team	W	L	Pct.	GB
New York Mets	87	75	.537	—
San Francisco Giants	87	75	.537	—
St. Louis Cardinals	86	76	.531	1
Miami Marlins	79	82	.491	7½
Pittsburgh Pirates	78	83	.484	8½
Colorado Rockies	75	87	.463	12
Milwaukee Brewers	73	89	.451	14
Philadelphia Phillies	71	91	.438	16
Arizona Diamondbacks	69	93	.426	18
Atlanta Braves	68	93	.422	18½
San Diego Padres	68	94	.420	19
Cincinnati Reds	68	94	.420	19

=== Record vs. opponents ===
2016 National League record Source: MLB Standings Grid – 2016
Team	AZ	ATL	CHC	CIN	COL	LAD	MIA	MIL	NYM	PHI	PIT	SD	SF	STL	WSH	AL
Arizona	—	5–2	2–5	3–3	10–9	7–12	2–4	3–4	5–1	4–3	1–5	10–9	6–13	4–3	2–5	5–15
Atlanta	2–5	—	3–3	3–4	1–6	1–5	11–7	2–5	10–9	11–8	3–4	4–2	3–4	2–4	4–15	8–12
Chicago	5–2	3–3	—	15–4	2–4	4–3	4–3	11–8	2–5	5–1	14–4	4–2	4–3	10–9	5–2	15–5
Cincinnati	3–3	4–3	4–15	—	5–2	2–5	3–4	11–8	0–6	4–2	9–10	3–4	3–3	9–10	3–4	5–15
Colorado	9–10	6–1	4–2	2–5	—	7–12	2–5	1–5	6–1	2–5	2–5	10–9	9–10	2–4	4–2	9–11
Los Angeles	12–7	5–1	3–4	5–2	12–7	—	1–6	5–2	4–3	4–2	2–5	11–8	8–11	4–2	5–1	10–10
Miami	4–2	7–11	3–4	4–3	5–2	6–1	—	4–2	7–12	9–10	6–1	3–3	2–4	4–3	9–10	6–14
Milwaukee	4–3	5–2	8–11	8–11	5–1	2–5	2–4	—	2–5	3–4	9–10	3–4	1–5	6–13	4–2	11–9
New York	1–5	9–10	5–2	6–0	1–6	3–4	12–7	5–2	—	12–7	3–3	4–3	4–3	3–3	7–12	12–8
Philadelphia	3–4	8–11	1–5	2–4	5–2	2–4	10–9	4–3	7–12	—	3–4	5–2	3–3	2–5	5–14	11–9
Pittsburgh	5–1	4–3	4–14	10–9	5–2	5–2	1–6	10–9	3–3	4–3	—	3–3	4–3	9–10	2–4	9–11
San Diego	9–10	2–4	2–4	4–3	9–10	8–11	3–3	4–3	3–4	2–5	3–3	—	8–11	1–6	4–3	6–14
San Francisco	13–6	4–3	3–4	3–3	10–9	11–8	4–2	5–1	3–4	3–3	3–4	11–8	—	3–4	3–4	8–12
St. Louis	3–4	4–2	9–10	10–9	4–2	2–4	3–4	13–6	3–3	5–2	10–9	6–1	4–3	—	2–5	8–12
Washington	5–2	15–4	2–5	4–3	2–4	1–5	10–9	2–4	12–7	14–5	4–2	3–4	4–3	5–2	—	12–8

=== Detailed records ===
National League
Opponent	W	L	WP	RS	RA
NL East
Atlanta Braves					
Miami Marlins	11	7	0.611	94	78
New York Mets	10	9	0.526	68	76
Philadelphia Phillies	11	8	0.579	80	70
Washington Nationals	4	15	0.211	80	109
Total	36	39	0.480	322	333
NL Central
Chicago Cubs	3	3	0.500	18	34
Cincinnati Reds	3	4	0.429	35	40
Milwaukee Brewers	2	5	0.286	17	30
Pittsburgh Pirates	3	4	0.429	35	40
St. Louis Cardinals	2	4	0.333	32	40
Total	13	20	0.394	137	184
NL West
Arizona Diamondbacks	2	5	0.286	34	40
Colorado Rockies	1	6	0.143	18	41
Los Angeles Dodgers	1	5	0.167	20	28
San Diego Padres	4	2	0.667	33	23
San Francisco Giants	3	4	0.429	17	38
Total	11	22	0.333	122	170
American League
Boston Red Sox	1	3	0.250	13	24
Chicago White Sox	2	1	0.667	17	13
Cleveland Indians	0	3	0.000	6	16
Detroit Tigers	2	1	0.667	8	9
Kansas City Royals	1	2	0.333	8	9
Minnesota Twins	2	2	0.500	16	21
Total	8	12	0.400	68	92
Season Total	68	93	0.422	649	779

Month	Games	Won	Lost	Win %	RS	RA
April	23	5	18	0.217	75	122
May	28	10	18	0.357	86	115
June	28	12	16	0.429	103	131
July	26	10	16	0.385	96	130
August	28	13	15	0.464	140	155
September	26	16	10	0.615	143	123
October	2	2	0	1.000	6	3
Total	161	68	93	0.422	649	779

	Games	Won	Lost	Win %	RS	RA
Home	81	31	50	0.383	335	404
Away	80	37	43	0.463	314	375
Total	161	68	93	0.422	649	779

== Season summary ==
Commemorative patch of the final season at Turner Field

The 2016 season was the Braves' final season at Turner Field, before moving to their new home at SunTrust Park. The stadium was originally built as a venue for the 1996 Summer Olympics before being converted for use by the Braves for the 1997 season. The team scheduled a number of special events and limited-edition giveaways in honor of its final season at Turner and the players wore a commemorative sleeve patch on their uniforms for the entire season. The patch showed an outline of the stadium with the words "Turner Field; Final Season, 1997–2016".

=== April ===
==== Opening Day and first series vs. Nationals ====
2016 Opening Day lineup
Position	Name
Center Fielder	Ender Inciarte
Shortstop	Erick Aybar
First Baseman	Freddie Freeman
Third Baseman	Adonis García
Right Fielder	Nick Markakis
Left Fielder	Héctor Olivera
Catcher	A. J. Pierzynski
Second Baseman	Jace Peterson
Starting Pitcher	Julio Teherán

The Braves began their season with a 4–3 loss in 10 innings after blowing the save in the top of the 9th. Nick Markakis of the Braves fell afoul of Major League Baseball's new "Chase Utley Rule" in the 7th inning when he slid too far out to the left of second base and initially prevented Daniel Murphy of the Nationals from making the double play.

The Braves ended their two-game series against the Nationals with a 3–1 loss after Matt den Dekker, who had been called up from the Syracuse Chiefs just a few hours prior, hit a two-run double to right-center.

==== Consecutive series sweeps ====
Despite opening up their next series with a four-run lead, the Braves gave up seven unanswered runs in a 7–4 loss to the Cardinals. Atlanta also gave up an MLB record three home runs to pinch hitters. In the second of the three-game series against the Cardinals, the Braves allowed nine unanswered runs in a 12–2 loss. After the loss, the Braves were the only team in the National League to have not won a single game yet. Atlanta closed out a three-game series against the Cardinals with a 12–7 loss. Braves pitcher Daniel Winkler suffered an elbow fracture after pitching 6 2/3rd's innings.

Things didn't improve on the first road trip of the season as the Braves lost 6–4 to the Nationals and fell to 0–6 for the first time since 1988. Mallex Smith, who earned a hit in his MLB debut, left the game in the fourth inning after suffering a cut to his face by his helmet. After eight scoreless innings in the second game of the series, Bryce Harper brought in two runs on a double to left field and the Nationals won 2–1. Home runs by Stephen Drew and Jayson Werth in the fourth inning handed the Braves their eighth loss of the season as the Nationals won 3–0. The Braves ended their road series against the Nationals with a 6–2 loss.

==== First wins vs. Marlins ====
After trailing 3–0 against the Marlins, the Braves scored six unanswered runs to win their first game of the season. Jason Grilli earned his first save since July 2015 with a 6–4 win over the Marlins in the second game of the series. The Braves swept the series over the Marlins with a 6–5 victory in a 10-inning game.

==== Continued struggles ====
The Braves earned their fourth win of the season against former Braves pitcher Alex Wood and the Los Angeles Dodgers in a lopsided 8–1 game at Turner Field. Wood said after the game that it "was not really the way I pictured coming back here for the first time. Fastball command was the most frustrating thing. I don't even know if I've walked in a run before in my professional career. The walks were pretty frustrating. It was a tough one to swallow, but I have another one in five days." Despite a 3–1 lead, the Dodgers scored four unanswered runs to snap the Braves four-game win streak. A Yasmani Grandal double in the 10th inning gave the Dodgers a 2–1 victory in the Braves's fourth extra-inning game of the season.

The Braves opened their next series with a 6–3 loss to the New York Mets. In the second game of the series, the Braves lost 8–2. The Braves ended their three-game series against the Mets with a 3–2 loss.

In their first interleague series of the season, former Braves closer Craig Kimbrel earned his 94th career save at Turner Field in a 1–0 victory over the Braves. In the second game of the series, David Price pitched 14 strikeouts to secure an 11–4 victory over the Braves. In the third game of the series and first of two at Fenway Park, the Braves surrendered a grand slam to Dustin Pedroia in a 9–4 loss to the Red Sox. Freddie Freeman ended the Braves's 15-game home run-less streak with a deep ball into right-center field in the eighth inning. In the final game of the series, three RBI's by Markakis contributed to the Braves ending their eight-game losing skid with a 5–3 victory over the Red Sox.

Despite a Freeman home run in the fourth inning, the Braves allowed six unanswered runs, including their fourth grand slam of the season, in a 6–1 loss to the Cubs.

=== May ===
==== 4–10 start ====
A sacrifice fly by Markakis in the 10th inning allowed Daniel Castro to score the go-ahead run and beat the Cubs 4–3.

In his 2016 debut, Mike Foltynewicz gave up three home runs in a 4–1 loss to the Mets. In the second game of the series, pitcher Matt Wisler surrendered one hit and earned his first win of the season in a 3–0 game against the Mets. The Braves fell 8–0 in the series finale to the Mets. Primary leadoff hitter Markakis wasn't in the lineup for the series finale as he traveled back home to Baltimore to tend to a family emergency.

Two errors by the Braves led to a 7–2 loss in the first of three games against the Diamondbacks. Former Braves starting pitcher Shelby Miller earned his first win of the season in a 4–2 victory over the Braves. Despite a two-run RBI by Jeff Francoeur to tie the game, the Braves gave up two home runs in the 11th inning in a 5–3 loss to the Diamondbacks.

Despite a ninth inning home run from Freeman and two players in scoring position, the Braves lost 3–2 in the first of three games against the Phillies. After being recalled from Triple-A Gwinnett, Williams Pérez surrendered one hit in eight innings pitched in a 5–1 victory over the Phillies. Despite a three-run double by Gordon Beckham in the seventh inning, the Braves were unable to capitalize with runners in walk off position in the ninth and fell 7–4 to the Phillies in the 10th.

The Braves opened up a three-game road series with a 5–1 loss to the reigning World Series champion Kansas City Royals. Foltynewicz earned his first win of the season with a 5–0 victory over the Royals. Despite tying the game in the ninth inning, Grilli gave up a two-run walk off home run to Kendrys Morales to fall 4–2 in the 13th inning. Despite home runs from Francoeur and Kelly Johnson, the Braves fell 8–5 to the Pittsburgh Pirates.

==== González and Tosca dismissed ====
On May 17, Fredi González was fired from his position as team manager, as was Carlos Tosca from his position as bench coach. Brian Snitker, manager of Triple-A Gwinnett, was promoted to interim manager of the Atlanta Braves. His debut didn't fare too well as, despite a season-high of nine runs, a seven-run deficit in the first inning proved too much to overcome in a 12–9 loss. Tyler Flowers hitting in three of four plate appearances and Julio Teherán surrendering only five hits gave Snitker his first win as an MLB manager in a 3–1 victory over the Pirates. The Braves closed out this four-game road series with an 8–2 loss. Regular shortstop Erick Aybar was removed from the lineup after undergoing a procedure to remove a dislodged chicken bone.

Despite surrendering a run in the first inning, three two-run home runs from Freeman and Markakis gave the Braves a 7–1 victory in the first of three games against the Phillies. Pérez allowed only two hits in 6 1/3 innings pitched to give the Braves their second series victory of the season in a 2–0 win over the Phillies. The Braves were unable to pull off a sweep of the series as they fell 5–0 to the Phillies.

The Braves opened up their next series back home with a 2–1 loss to the Brewers. Despite the loss, Julio Teherán recorded a career-high 12 strikeouts, including four in one inning. The Braves couldn't capitalize on loaded bases in the 12th inning, gave up a run on a single by Jonathan Villar and lost 3–2 in 13 innings. The Braves concluded their three-game series against the Brewers with a 6–2 loss.

Despite surrendering two runs in the third inning, key hits by Freeman and Markakis led to four unanswered runs scored by the Braves in a 4–2 win over the Marlins. The Braves earned their first home series win of the season in a 7–2 victory over the Marlins. The Braves failed to sweep the Marlins for the second time this season in a 7–3 loss to conclude the series.

The Braves opened up their next series with a 5–3 win over the Giants. Wisler put on a solid pitching performance until he allowed three runs in the eighth inning and the Braves fell 4–0.

=== June ===
==== More struggles ====
Despite trailing 4–1 at a point in the game, Markakis scored the tying run on a wild pitch in the bottom of the ninth inning, Chris Withrow kept the Braves in the game with his relief performance and Freeman hit a walk-off home run to right-center to beat the Giants 5–4 in the 11th inning. The Braves concluded their home-stand with a 6–0 loss to the Giants after squandering an early scoring opportunity by Chase d'Arnaud and Freeman in the first inning.

Despite opening the game with a two-run lead, the Braves surrendered four home runs, including three to Corey Seager, in a 4–2 loss to the Dodgers. Despite holding Clayton Kershaw to his shortest outing of the season and fewest strikeouts in over two years, the offensive-inept Braves were unable to capitalize and fell 4–0 to the Dodgers. The Braves concluded their series against the Dodgers by giving up multiple home runs in a 12–6 loss.

The Braves opened their next three-game series with Pérez exiting the game due to triceps soreness in the fifth inning and falling 7–2 to the Padres. Despite carrying a one-run lead into the ninth inning, Arodys Vizcaíno blew the save by surrendering a home run and a walk off single in a 4–3 loss. The Braves concluded their series with the Padres with Teherán surrendering just two runs in eight innings. Vizcaíno, who blew the save the night before, earned the save and the Braves won 4–2.

Back home at the Ted after a six-game road trip, Bud Norris pitched seven innings and gave up only four hits and one run as the Braves won 5–1 over the Cubs. The next game in the series saw Anthony Rizzo, who was scratched from the lineup the day before due to back issues, hit his 14th home run of the season as the Braves fell 8–2 to the Cubs. The Braves closed out their three-game series with a 13–2 loss to the Cubs.

==== Turnaround ====
Despite a scoring opportunity with bases loaded in the eighth inning, the Braves squandered it, gave up a shallow left hit to Joey Votto with bases loaded and lost 9–8 to the Reds. After a rough first inning for Teherán, the Braves only put up a run in a 3–1 loss to the Reds. After failing to score a walk off with bases loaded in the 11th and giving up two runs in the top of the 13th, a single by d'Arnaud allowed Jace Peterson to score the walk off run and gave the Braves a 9–8 victory. During the game, Freeman doubled in the third, tripled in the fourth, hit a home run in the sixth and singled in the 11th to become only the seventh Braves player to hit for the cycle and first to do so since Mark Kotsay in 2008. The Braves concluded the four-game series with two home runs from Freeman in a 7–2 victory over the Reds.

In the first of a five-game road trip, Braves relief pitcher John Gant pitched six and 2/3 innings and allowed only one run and two hits to earn his first win in Major League Baseball in a 5–1 victory over the Mets. After Inciarte scored the go-ahead run in the eighth inning, relief pitcher Jim Johnson struck out Curtis Granderson to earn his first save of the season and give the Braves the series victory in a 4–3 win over the Mets. Teherán pitched a complete game, gave up only one hit, kept the Mets from putting up a run in a 6–0 win and gave the Braves their longest win streak of the season.

Despite trailing 2–0 going into the eighth inning, Peterson tied the game with a two-run homer and hit the go-ahead RBI single to give the Braves their sixth straight win in a 3–2 victory over the Marlins. The Braves' six-game win streak came to an end in a 3–0 loss to the Marlins.

The Braves opened up their next series at home with a two-run go-ahead homer by Adonis García in the eighth inning to beat the Mets 4–3 Despite a six-run rally in the fifth inning, the Braves were unable to overcome the eight-run deficit they found themselves in early in the game and lost 8–6 to the Mets. After a scoreless pitching duel between Jacob deGrom and Teherán and going into extra innings, Kelly Johnson – who was traded from the Braves to the Mets earlier in the month – hit the game-winning home run in the 11th inning to hand the Braves a 1–0 loss. The Braves concluded the four-game series with home runs from Freeman and Garcia and a 5–2 victory over the Mets.

The Braves started their next series with an 8–3 loss to the Indians who came into the game riding a nine-game win streak. Starting pitcher Gant left the game in the third inning due to a left oblique strain. Despite tying the game in the sixth inning, an RBI single by Carlos Santana in the ninth inning led to a three-run rally by the Indians and the Braves fell 5–3. The Braves concluded the series with a 3–0 loss to the Indians who earned their 12th straight victory.

Despite giving up a three-run homer in the second inning, seven unanswered runs and a save by Mauricio Cabrera gave the Braves an 8–5 victory in the first of a four-game series against the Marlins.

=== July ===
Despite a game-tying home run in the bottom of the ninth by Tyler Flowers and bases loaded in the 10th and 11th inning, a two-run double by pinch-hitter José Fernández in the 12th inning gave the Marlins a 7–5 victory over the Braves. The next day proved rough for Fernández as he surrendered eight hits, six runs and a walk in five and 2/3rd's innings pitched as the Braves beat the Marlins 9–1.

==== Fort Bragg Game ====
The Braves concluded their four-game series against the Marlins with a 5–2 loss in the Fort Bragg Game, the first ever Major League Baseball game played at a United States military installation in Fort Bragg.

The Braves opened their next series by surrendering seven runs in the second inning in an 8–2 loss to the Phillies. Foltynewicz gave up four homers in six innings pitched in a 5–1 loss to the Phillies. Despite carrying a one-run lead into the eighth inning, a two-run homer by Freddy Galvis gave a 4–3 victory to the Phillies.

In a makeup game postponed from April 30 due to rain, Markakis hit two home runs – including the game-tying home run in the ninth – and Flowers hit a two-out single in the 11th inning to give the Braves a 4–3 victory over the Cubs.

The Braves put on their best offensive output of the season to date with 15 hits, eight of which came in the fifth inning alone, 11 runs – four of which also came in the fifth inning – and three home runs from Flowers, Freeman and Markakis to beat the White Sox 11–8 in the first of a three-game series. Three home runs weren't enough to overcome a five-run deficit as the Braves fell 5–4 to the White Sox in the second game of the series. The Braves concluded the series with Foltynewicz allowing five hits, no runs and two homers scored by Francoeur and Peterson to beat the White Sox 2–0.

==== After All-Star break ====
In their first game following the All-Star break, the Braves gave up 11 runs – including a grand slam in the ninth inning – in an 11–2 loss to the Rockies. Despite leading by three runs going into the eighth inning and Foltynewicz only surrendering two hits in 7 1/3 innings pitched, four different pitchers in the eighth allowed the Rockies to rally back, allowed Trevor Story to score the go-ahead run, ended a 43-game losing streak when trailing after seven innings and resulted in a 4–3 loss to the Rockies. After eight and a half innings of a scoreless pitching duel between Teherán and Jon Gray, d'Arnaud hit a walk off single off Gonzalez Germen that allowed Inciarte to score and gave the Braves a 1–0 victory over the Rockies.

Despite scoring first with an RBI double from Francoeur in the fourth inning, the Braves surrendered three home runs in an 8–2 loss to the Reds. Despite a blown save opportunity by Johnson, a sacrifice fly by Inciarte in the 11th led to the go-ahead run that gave the Braves a 5–4 victory. The Braves closed out the series with two home runs, but squandered a two-run lead to fall 6–3 to the Reds.

The Braves opened up their next road series by surrendering a three-run homer in the sixth inning and falling 6–3 to the Rockies. Despite loading the bases with one out in the ninth inning, the Braves were unable to capitalize and fell 4–3 to the Rockies. Teherán exited the game in the fifth inning with upper back discomfort. What had started as a strong outing for Wisler with only surrendering two hits after five innings pitched turned into a five-run collapse in the sixth inning as the Braves fell 8–4 to the Rockies. The Braves concluded the four-game series by surrendering seven runs, including a home run, in a 7–2 loss to the Rockies.

Lucas Harrell held the Twins to four singles and three walks over six innings pitched as the Braves ended a five-game losing streak with a 2–0 win in the first of two games against the Twins. The Braves concluded the two-game series with every player in the lineup earning one hit, three players hitting home runs, Foltynewicz earned the victory and Johnson earned the save in a 9–7 victory over the Twins.

Five unanswered runs weren't enough to overcome a seven-run deficit, four of which came in the first inning alone, as the Braves fell 7–5 in the first of a four-game home series against the Phillies. Tyrell Jenkins surrendered one unearned run, four hits and four walks to earn his first career victory and Johnson earned his fifth save of the season as the Braves beat the Phillies 2–1. A blown 2–1 lead through the fifth inning progressed into the Phillies accumulating no hits, four walks, two errors, a hit batter and four runs while batting around in the eighth inning and the Braves fell 9–5. The Braves closed out the four-game series against the Phillies with a two-run homer by Francouer in a 2–1 victory.

=== August ===
Despite putting up the first run of the game and not allowing a hit through the first four innings, the Braves – thanks in part to Foltynewicz's struggles with batters the third time up – gave up five runs, including a home run to Matt Joyce, in a 5–3 loss to the Pirates. Despite allowing four runs in the first inning, the Braves rallied back to score eight unanswered runs and earned Rob Whalen his first career victory as a major league pitcher in an 8–4 win over the Pirates. The Braves concluded their three-game home stand, thanks to an improbable stolen base attempt by García in the seventh inning, with a 5–2 victory to win the series against the Pirates.

While Joel De La Cruz only surrendered two hits and five walks over 5 1/3rd innings pitched, Jaime García hit the go-ahead RBI with a single in the second inning and the Braves fell 1–0 in the first of three games against the Cardinals. Three-run homers from Freeman and García, and two-run homers from Inciarte and trade deadline acquisition Matt Kemp contributed to the Braves highest offensive output of the season in a 13–5 rout of the Cardinals. The Braves concluded the three-game road series with Foltynewicz holding the Cardinals to one run and six hits, scored his first career run and Johnson earned his eighth save of the season in a 6–3 victory.

A sacrifice fly to the center-field warning track by Beckham allowed Kemp to score the go-ahead run in the 12th and the Braves won 4–3 in the first of four games against the Brewers. Despite giving up the first run of the game off a Ryan Braun home run, the Braves scored two runs on a walk and three singles in the seventh inning to win the second game of the series 2–1. Two home runs from Freeman weren't enough to overcome a three-run homer by Chris Carter in the third inning as the Braves fell 4–3. In the final game of the series, the Brewers scored a run in every inning of the game – only the eighth time this feat has occurred since 1961 – as the Braves could only put up an Aybar homer in an 11–3 loss.

A three-run homer by Freeman and a solo home run by Peterson led to the Braves snapping a 14-game losing streak at Nationals Park in an 8–5 win in the first of three games against the Nationals. A four-run rally in the ninth inning wasn't enough to overcome a five-run deficit as the Braves fell 7–6 in the second game of the series. The Braves concluded the three-game series and 10-game stretch on the road by surrendering a three-run homer to Anthony Rendon in a 9–1 loss to the Nationals.

A two-run rally in the bottom of the eighth to pull to within a run was not enough to overcome the three-run deficit or a Trevor Plouffe RBI in the top of the ninth as the Braves dropped fell 4–2 in the first of a two-game interleague series against the Twins. The Braves concluded their two-game series against the Twins by surrendering 10 runs in a 10–3 loss.

Despite pulling to within a run off a Kemp groundout in the sixth inning, the Nationals went on a five-run tear in the eighth to beat the Braves 8–2 in the first of a four-game series. Despite a three-run rally in the eighth to tie the game, Clint Robinson hit a go-ahead RBI single to left field that handed the Braves their sixth straight loss in a 7–6 defeat. A late rally by the Braves wasn't enough to overcome giving up eight runs in the fourth inning as the Braves lost their seventh straight game in an 11–9 defeat. The Braves concluded the four-game series against the Nationals with a walk-off homer from Peterson in the 10th inning to snap a seven-game losing streak in a 7–6 victory.

Despite two homers from Freeman, Vizcaíno blew a 7–4 lead in the seventh inning and Gant gave up a walk-off homer to Paul Goldschmidt in the ninth as the Braves fell 9–8 in the first of a four-game series against the Diamondbacks. Trailing by a run with three runners on base and two outs in the eighth inning, Kemp hit a base-clearing double to right-field that put the Braves ahead and went on to win 7–4. A four-run rally in the ninth inning tied the game, but a sacrifice fly by former Braves prospect Brandon Drury allowed Jake Lamb to score the winning run in the 11th inning and the Braves fell 10–9. After a stint in AAA, Wisler surrendered only one run and two hits with four strikeouts and three walks as the Braves used the three runs scored in the third inning to split the series with the Diamondbacks in a 3–1 victory.

Despite loading the bases in both the first and second innings, the Braves were unable to score a run and surrendered five runs in those first two innings in a 7–2 loss in the first of three games against the Giants. A three-run homer by Kemp in the fourth inning and one run surrendered in 7 2/3rd innings pitched by Foltynewicz was enough to secure a 3–1 win for the Braves in the second game of the series. The Braves concluded the series by surrendering four homers in a 13–4 loss to the Giants.

In their return to Turner Field on August 30, the Braves put on an offensive showcase with 12 hits and scored on six of those hits to win 7–3 in the first of a three-game series against the Padres. The next day, the Braves continued their high offensive output with 12 hits and eight runs scored, including an Inciarte run scored off a Paul Clemens balk in the first inning, to beat the Padres 8–1 in the second game of the series.

=== September ===
The Braves concluded the three-game series against the Padres on September 1 with another high offensive output, that included a Freeman homer that kick-started a five-run rally in the fifth inning, as they earned their first home sweep of the season in a 9–6 victory.

Back on the road in Philadelphia on September 2, the Braves, starting the top of the ninth inning with the game tied 4–4, batted around with hits from Inciarte, Garcia, Freeman, Kemp, Markakis and Freeman a second time to score five runs, and win 9–4 in the first of a three-game series against the Phillies. The next night, two homers from Garcia, a fielders choice grounder from Flowers to drive in the go-ahead run and a ground out from Peterson to bring in another run gave the Braves a 6–4 victory in the second game of the series. In the final game of the three-game series, Teheran gave up only five hits and struck out seven batters in six innings pitched, Kemp hit his 28th homer of the season in the second and Freeman hit his 29th in the eighth, and Johnson earned his 15th save of the season to beat the Phillies 2–0.

In the first game of a three-game series in the nation's capital, a fielder's choice RBI by Peterson and a two-run rally in the ninth wasn't enough to overcome a five-run deficit – a two-run homer by Trea Turner and a three-run homer by Chris Heisey, both in the third inning – and the Braves's six-game win streak was snapped with a 6–4 loss to the Nationals. After Perez gave up a 4–1 lead in the third inning of the second game of the series, which included a Rendon grand slam and a homer from Ryan Zimmerman, the Braves rallied back with RBI's from Dansby Swanson and Joel De La Cruz to tie the game at 6–6. However, the Nationals responded with a three-run eighth inning, which included Michael Taylor scoring on a Flowers throwing error, and a Swanson single RBI in the ninth wasn't enough to prevent a 9–7 loss. In the final game of the series, Chris Withrow blew a two-run lead in the seventh inning and the game eventually went into extra innings. A Peterson RBI single in the 10th put the Braves up a run in the 10th, but Rendon responded with an RBI single to tie the game again. A walk-off single by Wilson Ramos in the 11th secured a 5–4 victory for the Nationals.

The Braves started the first of a three-game series on September 9 with a 4–0 lead, but a six-run unanswered rally – which included a two-run homer by Curtis Granderson – by the Mets beginning in the sixth inning led to a 6–4 defeat for the Braves. In the second game of the series, Kemp tied the game with a homer in the sixth and a walk-off RBI single by Garcia in the 10th gave the Braves a 4–3 victory over the Mets. In the final game of the series, the Braves gave up 10 runs – including a third inning grand slam by Yoenis Céspedes – in a 10–3 loss to the Mets.

In the first of a three-game series against the Marlins on September 12, the Braves put up seven unanswered runs in the first three innings – including a Markakis homer – before giving up seven runs to the Marlins. The Braves responded with five runs to beat the Marlins 12–7. Five runs, including a two-run homer by Freeman and a solo homer by Kemp, were not enough to overcome seven runs by the Marlins in a 7–5 loss in the second game of the series. In the final game of the series, benches cleared after José Ramírez threw a pitch that went behind the head of Marlins pitcher José Fernández. No punches were thrown and Ramírez was ejected from the game. The Marlins went on to win 7–5.

In the first of a three-game series against the Nationals on September 16, Max Scherzer surrendered only two runs in seven innings pitched, the Nationals put up seven runs, including a two-run homer from Turner, and the Braves fell 7–2. Despite surrendering a lead-off homer to Tuner to start the second game of the series, the Braves responded with six runs off nine hits in the fifth inning and beat the Nationals 7–3. In the final game of the series, Wisler surrendered just two runs and Garcia drove in three runs before the game was called in the bottom of the seventh, and the Braves won their first series against the Nationals this season in the final game against the NL East rival for the season.

In the first of a three-game road series against the Mets on September 19, the Braves put up seven runs, including a solo homer by Freeman, and Blair surrendered just two runs off four hits in six innings pitched to earn his first victory of the season in a 7–3 win over the Mets. In the second game, the Braves put up five runs, including a three-run homer in the seventh inning by Garcia, and Johnson earned the save to win series in a 5–4 victory over the Mets. The Mets jumped to a three-run lead in the final game of the series, but the Braves rallied back with four unanswered runs, which included a two-run homer by Anthony Recker in the seventh inning, to take the lead in the top of the ninth. In an almost exact repeat of the night before, Braves closer Johnson faced off against Cespedes with two outs in the bottom of the ninth. Cespedes hit the ball to deep right-center and had the distance for a three-run homer, but center fielder Inciarte raced towards the wall, made the jump and caught the ball above the fence to get the final out for a 4–3 Braves victory in their final game of the season against the Mets.

In the first of a four-game road series against the Marlins on September 22, the Braves put up six runs, including two homers from Kemp totaling three runs, in a 6–3 victory over the Marlins. In the second game of the series, the Braves rallied back from a two-run deficit to score three unanswered runs and beat the Marlins 3–2. In the third inning, Kemp was ejected, and so was manager Snitker, for arguing with the home plate umpire over a 3–1 pitch call. Despite Freeman's adding to his 28-game hit streak with two hits and a homer, the Braves couldn't overcome Blair surrendering six hits, five runs and three walks in 3 1/3 innings pitched, and fell 6–4 for only the second time at Marlins Park in 2016 in the third game of the series. The final game of the series was cancelled following the news that Marlins pitcher José Fernández died in a boating accident earlier that morning. The game was never made up as the season was nearly ending and both teams were out of playoff contention.

In the first of a three-game home series against the Phillies on September 28, the Braves found themselves in a six-run hole, largely due to Teheran surrendering a grand slam homer in the first inning. However, they scored seven unanswered runs and beat the Phillies 7–6. High offensive output defined the second game of the series as the Braves put up 12 runs, nine of which were surrendered by Adam Morgan, in a 12–2 win over the Phillies. With the score tied at one in the bottom of the eighth, Kemp opened the floodgates with an RBI double into right field that allowed Swanson to score and the Braves swept the Phillies 5–2 in the final division series of the season.

In the first game of the final series of the season and final series at Turner Field on September 30, the Braves put up just two runs, via solo homers from Kemp and Brandon Snyder, against six runs by the wild-card hopeful Detroit Tigers, three of which came via two Miguel Cabrera homers, in a 6–2 loss.

=== October ===
In the second game of the series against the Tigers on October 1, the Braves damaged the Tigers' wild-card hopes with five runs, including a two-run homer by Freeman and a solo homer by Markakis, in a 5–3 victory. In the final game of the season, and last at Turner Field, the Braves beat the Tigers 1–0 with Freddie Freeman's first-inning sacrifice fly providing the only run of the game to finish the season at 68–93, and for the first time all season, the Braves did not have the worst record in the National League. This win eliminated the Tigers from postseason contention.

== Game log ==
Legend
	Braves win
	Braves loss
	Postponement
**Bold**	Braves team member

2016 Game Log: 68–93 (Home: 31–49; Away: 37–43; Neutral 0–1)
April: 5–18 (Home: 1–12; Away: 4–6)

#	Date	Opponent	Score	Win	Loss	Save	Attendance	Record	Box/Streak
1	April 4	Nationals	3–4 (10)	Treinen (1–0)	**O'Flaherty** (0–1)	Papelbon (1)	48,282	0–1	L1
2	April 6	Nationals	4–6	Strasburg (1–0)	**Norris** (0–1)	Papelbon (2)	18,531	0–2	L2
3	April 8	Cardinals	4–7	Siegrist (1–0)	**O'Flaherty** (0–2)	Rosenthal (1)	24,824	0–3	L3
4	April 9	Cardinals	2–12	Martinez (1–0)	**Teherán** (0–1)	—	33,471	0–4	L4
5	April 10	Cardinals	7–12	Oh (1–0)	**Johnson** (0–1)	Rosenthal (2)	23,214	0–5	L5
6	April 11	@ Nationals	4–6	Scherzer (1–0)	**Norris** (0–2)	Papelbon (4)	18,119	0–6	L6
7	April 12	@ Nationals	1–2	Treinen (2–0)	**Johnson** (0–2)	Rivero (1)	18,378	0–7	L7
8	April 13	@ Nationals	0–3	Roark (1–1)	**Wisler** (0–1)	Papelbon (5)	19,400	0–8	L8
9	April 14	@ Nationals	2–6	Strasburg (2–0)	**Teherán** (0–2)	—	21,144	0–9	L9
10	April 15	@ Marlins	6–3	**Ogando** (1–0)	Phelps (2–1)	**Vizcaíno** (1)	18,071	1–9	W1
11	April 16	@ Marlins	6–4	**Norris** (1–2)	Koehler (0–2)	**Grilli** (1)	33,123	2–9	W2
12	April 17	@ Marlins	6–5 (10)	**Grilli** (1–0)	Jackson (0–1)	**Wisler** (1)	24,780	3–9	W3
13	April 19	Dodgers	8–1	**Weber** (1–0)	Wood (1–2)	—	14,160	4–9	W4
14	April 20	Dodgers	3–5 (10)	Blanton (1–1)	**Grilli** (1–1)	Jansen (6)	16,087	4–10	L1
15	April 21	Dodgers	1–2 (10)	Hatcher (2–1)	**Ogando** (1–1)	Jansen (7)	18,431	4–11	L2
16	April 22	Mets	3–6	Harvey (1–3)	**Norris** (1–3)	Familia (4)	21,173	4–12	L3
17	April 23	Mets	2–8	Matz (2–1)	**Chacín** (0–1)	—	35,230	4–13	L4
18	April 24	Mets	2–3	deGrom (2–0)	**Blair** (0–1)	Familia (5)	32,085	4–14	L5
19	April 25	Red Sox	0–1	Porcello (4–0)	**Teherán** (0–3)	Kimbrel (6)	22,735	4–15	L6
20	April 26	Red Sox	4–11	Price (3–0)	**Wisler** (0–2)	—	23,487	4–16	L7
21	April 27	@ Red Sox	4–9	Wright (2–2)	**Norris** (1–4)	—	33,308	4–17	L8
22	April 28	@ Red Sox	5–3	**Chacín** (1–1)	Buchholz (0–3)	**Vizcaíno** (2)	32,232	5–17	W1
23	April 29	@ Cubs	1–6	Strop (1–0)	**Johnson** (0–3)	—	34,007	5–18	L1
—	April 30	@ Cubs	**Postponed (inclement weather)** (Makeup date: July 7, 2016)						

May: 10–18 (Home: 4–10; Away: 6–8)

#	Date	Opponent	Score	Win	Loss	Save	Attendance	Record	Box/Streak
24	May 1	@ Cubs	4–3 (10)	**Vizcaíno** (1–0)	Rondón (0–1)	**Grilli** (2)	40,164	6–18	W1
25	May 2	@ Mets	1–4	Colón (2–1)	**Foltynewicz** (0–1)	—	23,847	6–19	L1
26	May 3	@ Mets	3–0	**Wisler** (1–2)	Harvey (2–4)	**Vizcaíno** (3)	27,356	7–19	W1
27	May 4	@ Mets	0–8	Matz (4–1)	**Chacín** (1–2)	—	31,783	7–20	L1
28	May 6	D-backs	2–7	Greinke (3–2)	**Blair** (0–2)	—	23,514	7–21	L2
29	May 7	D-backs	2–4	Miller (1–3)	**Norris** (1–5)	Ziegler (6)	22,178	7–22	L3
30	May 8	D-backs	3–5	Delgado (1–1)	**Johnson** (0–4)	Ziegler (7)	17,106	7–23	L4
31	May 10	Phillies	2–3	Morgan (1–0)	**Wisler** (1–3)	Gómez (12)	14,490	7–24	L5
32	May 11	Phillies	5–1	**Pérez** (1–0)	Eickhoff (1–5)	—	13,760	8–24	W1
33	May 12	Phillies	4–7	Bailey (2–0)	**Grilli** (1–2)	Gómez (13)	15,643	8–25	L1
34	May 13	@ Royals	1–5	Vólquez (4–3)	**Teherán** (0–4)	—	33,132	8–26	L2
35	May 14	@ Royals	5–0	**Foltynewicz** (1–1)	Gee (0–1)	—	36,541	9–26	W1
36	May 15	@ Royals	2–4 (13)	Wang (2–0)	**O'Flaherty** (0–3)	—	33,861	9–27	L1
37	May 16	@ Pirates	5–8	Niese (4–2)	**Pérez** (1–1)	Melancon (12)	16,905	9–28	L2
38	May 17	@ Pirates	9–12	Nicasio (4–3)	**Blair** (0–3)	Melancon (13)	19,400	9–29	L3
39	May 18	@ Pirates	3–1	**Teherán** (1–4)	Liriano (3–3)	**Vizcaíno** (4)	18,201	10–29	W1
40	May 19	@ Pirates	2–8	Locke (2–3)	**Foltynewicz** (1–2)	—	23,074	10–30	L1
41	May 20	@ Phillies	7–1	**Wisler** (2–3)	Nola (3–3)	—	27,257	11–30	W1
42	May 21	@ Phillies	2–0	**Pérez** (2–1)	Morgan (1–2)	**Vizcaíno** (5)	20,196	12–30	W2
43	May 22	@ Phillies	0–5	Eickhoff (1–5)	**Kelly** (0–1)	—	23,367	12–31	L1
44	May 24	Brewers	1–2	Blazek (2–1)	**Norris** (1–6)	Jeffress (12)	15,185	12–32	L2
45	May 25	Brewers	2–3 (13)	Blazek (3–1)	**Kelly** (0–2)	Torres (1)	12,869	12–33	L3
46	May 26	Brewers	2–6	Peralta (3–5)	**Wisler** (2–4)	Torres (2)	14,885	12–34	L4
47	May 27	Marlins	4–2	**Krol** (1–0)	Phelps (3–3)	**Vizcaíno** (6)	19,325	13–34	W1
48	May 28	Marlins	7–2	**O'Flaherty** (1–3)	Ureña (1–1)	—	33,879	14–34	W2
49	May 29	Marlins	3–7	Koehler (3–5)	**Teherán** (1–5)	—	50,247	14–35	L1
50	May 30	Giants	5–3	**Foltynewicz** (2–2)	Samardzija (7–3)	—	23,147	15–35	W1
51	May 31	Giants	0–4	Peavy (2–5)	**Wisler** (2–5)	—	15,723	15–36	L1

June: 12–16 (Home: 7–10; Away: 5–6)

#	Date	Opponent	Score	Win	Loss	Save	Attendance	Record	Box/Streak
52	June 1	Giants	5–4	**Withrow** (1–0)	Law (1–1)	—	15,107	16–36	W1
53	June 2	Giants	0–6	Bumgarner (7–2)	**Blair** (0–4)	—	15,983	16–37	L1
54	June 3	@ Dodgers	2–4	Maeda (5–3)	**Teherán** (1–6)	Jansen (16)	46,366	16–38	L2
55	June 4	@ Dodgers	0–4	Kershaw (8–1)	**Norris** (1–7)	—	47,126	16–39	L3
56	June 5	@ Dodgers	6–12	Kazmir (5–3)	**Wisler** (2–6)	—	47,950	16–40	L4
57	June 6	@ Padres	2–7	Friedrich (3–1)	**Pérez** (2–2)	—	20,203	16–41	L5
58	June 7	@ Padres	3–4	Thornton (1–0)	**Vizcaíno** (1–1)	—	22,198	16–42	L6
59	June 8	@ Padres	4–2	**Teherán** (2–6)	Pomeranz (5–6)	**Vizcaíno** (7)	22,248	17–42	W1
60	June 10	Cubs	5–1	**Norris** (2–7)	Hammel (7–2)	—	30,547	18–42	W2
61	June 11	Cubs	2–8	Arrieta (10–1)	**Wisler** (2–7)	—	43,114	18–43	L1
62	June 12	Cubs	2–13	Lester (8–3)	**Gant** (0–1)	—	31,625	18–44	L2
63	June 13	Reds	8–9	Ohlendorf (5–5)	**Vizcaíno** (1–2)	Cingrani (7)	13,198	18–45	L3
64	June 14	Reds	1–3	Finnegan (3–4)	**Teherán** (2–7)	Wood (1)	13,176	18–46	L4
65	June 15	Reds	9–8	**Ogando** (2–1)	Simón (2–7)	—	14,953	19–46	W1
66	June 16	Reds	7–2	**Wisler** (3–7)	Straily (4–3)	—	21,885	20–46	W2
67	June 17	@ Mets	5–1	**Gant** (1–1)	Harvey (4–9)	—	40,148	21–46	W3
68	June 18	@ Mets	4–3	**Álvarez** (1–0)	Reed (1–1)	**Johnson** (1)	32,134	22–46	W4
69	June 19	@ Mets	6–0	**Teherán** (3–7)	deGrom (3–4)	—	41,576	23–46	W5
70	June 21	@ Marlins	3–2 (10)	**Withrow** (2–0)	Barraclough (3–2)	**Vizcaíno** (8)	19,961	24–46	W6
71	June 22	@ Marlins	0–3	Conley (4–4)	**Gant** (1–2)	Ramos (23)	22,642	24–47	L1
72	June 23	Mets	4–3	**Johnson** (1–4)	Reed (1–2)	**Vizcaíno** (9)	22,324	25–47	W1
73	June 24	Mets	6–8	Robles (2–3)	**Blair** (0–5)	Familia (25)	25,565	25–48	L1
74	June 25	Mets	0–1 (11)	Reed (2–2)	**Álvarez** (1–1)	Familia (26)	40,879	25–49	L2
75	June 26	Mets	5–2	**Norris** (3–7)	Colón (6–4)	**Vizcaíno** (10)	20,484	26–49	W1
76	June 27	Indians	3–8	Bauer (6–2)	**Jenkins** (0–1)	—	15,538	26–50	L1
77	June 28	Indians	3–5	Kluber (8–7)	**Vizcaíno** (1–3)	Allen (15)	19,206	26–51	L2
78	June 29	Indians	0–3	Salazar (10–3)	**De La Cruz** (0–1)	Allen (16)	16,600	26–52	L3
79	June 30	Marlins	8–5	**Álvarez** (2–1)	Chen (4–3)	**Cabrera** (1)	16,097	27–52	W1

July: 10–16 (Home: 4–5; Away: 6–10; Neutral: 0–1)

#	Date	Opponent	Score	Win	Loss	Save	Attendance	Record	Box/Streak
80	July 1	Marlins	5–7 (12)	Wittgren (3–1)	**Kelly** (0–3)	McGowan (1)	32,036	27–53	L1
81	July 2	Marlins	9–1	**Harrell** (1–0)	Fernández (10–4)	—	23,448	28–53	W1
82	July 3	vs. Marlins (@ Fort Bragg)	2–5	Conley (5–5)	**Wisler** (3–8)	—	12,582	28–54	L1
83	July 4	@ Phillies	2–8	Eickhoff (6–9)	**De La Cruz** (0–2)	—	19,064	28–55	L2
84	July 5	@ Phillies	1–5	Eflin (1–2)	**Foltynewicz** (2–3)	—	18,426	28–56	L3
85	July 6	@ Phillies	3–4	Neris (3–3)	**Vizcaino** (1–4)	Gomez (23)	19,211	28–57	L4
86	July 7	@ Cubs	4–3 (11)	**Alvarez** (3–1)	Patton (1–1)	**Cabrera** (2)	41,480	29–57	W1
87	July 8	@ White Sox	11–8	**Wisler** (4–8)	Sale (14–3)	—	26,199	30–57	W2
88	July 9	@ White Sox	4–5	Quintana (7–8)	Teheran (3–8)	Jones (3)	23,888	30–58	L1
89	July 10	@ White Sox	2–0	**Foltynewicz** (3–3)	Shields (4–10)	**Johnson** (2)	29,156	31–58	W1
**87th All-Star Game in San Diego, California**
90	July 15	Rockies	2–11	De La Rosa (6–6)	**Harrell** (1–1)	—	27,236	31–59	L1
91	July 16	Rockies	3–4	Logan (1–0)	**Johnson** (1–5)	Estevez (5)	28,393	31–60	L2
92	July 17	Rockies	1–0	**Johnson** (2–5)	Germen (2–1)	—	18,873	32–60	W1
93	July 18	@ Reds	2–8	Finnegan (5–7)	**Wisler** (4–6)	—	21,989	32–61	L1
94	July 19	@ Reds	5–4 (11)	**Cabrera** (1–0)	Cingrani (2–3)	—	23,080	33–61	W1
95	July 20	@ Reds	3–6	DeSclafani (5–0)	**Harrell** (1–2)	—	22,091	33–62	L1
96	July 21	@ Rockies	3–7	Bettis (8–6)	**Foltynewicz** (3–4)	Estevez (7)	36,527	33–63	L2
97	July 22	@ Rockies	3–4	Gray (6–4)	**De La Cruz** (0–3)	Estevez (8)	35,880	33–64	L3
98	July 23	@ Rockies	4–8	Anderson (3–3)	**Wisler** (4–10)	—	46,195	33–65	L4
99	July 24	@ Rockies	2–7	Chatwood (9–6)	**Jenkins** (0–2)	—	34,695	33–66	L5
100	July 26	@ Twins	2–0	**Harrell** (2–2)	Satnana (3–9)	**Johnson** (3)	26,690	34–66	W1
101	July 27	@ Twins	9–7	**Foltynewicz** (4–4)	Duffey (5–8)	**Johnson** (4)	29,482	35–66	W2
102	July 28	Phillies	5–7	Nola (6–9)	**Wisler** (4–11)	Gomez (27)	22,785	35–67	L1
103	July 29	Phillies	2–1	**Jenkins** (1–2)	Velasquez (8–3)	**Johnson** (5)	27,732	36–67	W1
104	July 30	Phillies	5–9	Hellickson (8–7)	**Teheran** (3–9)	—	38,236	36–68	L1
105	July 31	Phillies	2–1	**Cabrera** (2–0)	Bailey (3–1)	**Johnson** (6)	27,732	37–68	W1

August: 13–15 (Home: 5–6; Away: 8–9)

#	Date	Opponent	Score	Win	Loss	Save	Attendance	Record	Box/Streak
106	August 2	Pirates	3–5	Cole (7–6)	**Foltynewicz** (4–5)	Watson (1)	20,633	37–69	L1
107	August 3	Pirates	8–4	**Whalen** (1–0)	Locke (8–7)	—	19,281	38–69	W1
108	August 4	Pirates	5–2	**Cervenka** (1–0)	Rivero (0–4)	**Johnson** (7)	20,527	39–69	W2
109	August 5	@ Cardinals	0–1	García (8–8)	**De La Cruz** (0–4)	Oh (9)	42,421	39–70	L1
110	August 6	@ Cardinals	13–5	**Hernández** (1–0)	Martínez (10–7)	—	45,468	40–70	W1
111	August 7	@ Cardinals	6–3	**Foltynewicz** (5–5)	Wainwright (9–6)	—	42,960	41–70	W2
112	August 8	@ Brewers	4–3 (12)	**Cunniff** (1–0)	Torres (2–2)	**Johnson** (9)	20,976	42–70	W3
113	August 9	@ Brewers	2–1	**Jenkins** (2–2)	Peralta (4–8)	**Cabrera** (3)	20,048	43–70	W4
114	August 10	@ Brewers	3–4	Anderson (7–10)	**De La Cruz** (0–5)	Thornburg (4)	20,035	43–71	L1
115	August 11	@ Brewers	3–11	Garza (4–4)	**Hernández** (1–1)	—	30,167	43–72	L2
116	August 12	@ Nationals	8–5	**Foltynewicz** (6–5)	Strasburg (15–3)	**Johnson** (10)	29,089	44–72	W1
117	August 13	@ Nationals	6–7	López (1–1)	**Whalen** (1–1)	Melancon (33)	38,490	44–73	L1
118	August 14	@ Nationals	1–9	Roark (13–6)	**Jenkins** (2–3)	—	29,107	44–74	L2
119	August 16	Twins	2–4	Santana (6–9)	**De La Cruz** (0–6)	Kintzler (12)	17,611	44–75	L3
120	August 17	Twins	3–10	Gibson (5–7)	**O'Flaherty** (1–4)	—	19,304	44–76	L4
121	August 18	Nationals	2–8	López (2–1)	**Whalen** (1–2)	—	24,099	44–77	L5
122	August 19	Nationals	6–7	Glover (1–0)	**Johnson** (2–6)	Melancon (35)	30,292	44–78	L6
123	August 20	Nationals	9–11	Scherzer (13–7)	**Jenkins** (2–4)	Melancon (36)	42,421	44–79	L7
124	August 21	Nationals	7–6 (10)	**Ramírez** (1–0)	Kelley (1–2)	—	25,341	45–79	W1
125	August 22	@ D-backs	8–9 (10)	Burgos (1–1)	**Gant** (1–3)	—	15,789	45–80	L1
126	August 23	@ D-backs	7–4	**Ramírez** (2–0)	Barrett (1–2)	**Johnson** (11)	18,780	46–80	W1
127	August 24	@ D-backs	9–10 (10)	Corbin (5–13)	**Ramírez** (2–1)	—	15,376	46–81	L1
128	August 25	@ D-backs	3–1	**Wisler** (5–11)	Ray (7–11)	**Johnson** (12)	18,698	47–81	W1
129	August 26	@ Giants	0–7	Samardzija (11–9)	**De La Cruz** (0–7)	—	41,283	47–82	L1
130	August 27	@ Giants	3–1	**Foltynewicz** (7–5)	Suárez (3–2)	**Johnson** (13)	41,635	48–82	W1
131	August 28	@ Giants	4–13	Bumgarner (13–8)	**Blair** (0–6)	—	41,675	48–83	L1
132	August 30	Padres	7–3	**Teheran** (4–9)	Jackson (3–5)	—	20,309	49–83	W1
133	August 31	Padres	8–1	**Wisler** (6–11)	Clemens (2–4)	—	20,899	50–83	W2

September: 16–10 (Home: 8–6; Away: 8–4)

#	Date	Opponent	Score	Win	Loss	Save	Attendance	Record	Box/Streak
134	September 1	Padres	9–6	**Foltynewicz** (8–5)	Cosart (0–2)	**Johnson** (14)	22,253	51–83	W3
135	September 2	@ Phillies	8–4	**Cabrera** (3–0)	Gómez (3–3)	—	17,175	52–83	W4
136	September 3	@ Phillies	6–4	**Bradley** (1–0)	Ramos (1–2)	**Cabrera** (4)	19,453	53–83	W5
137	September 4	@ Phillies	2–0	**Teherán** (5–9)	Thompson (1–5)	**Johnson** (15)	21,322	54–83	W6
138	September 5	@ Nationals	4–6	Scherzer (16–7)	**Weber** (1–1)	—	26,005	54–84	L1
139	September 6	@ Nationals	7–9	Glover (2–0)	**Ramírez** (2–2)	**Melancon** (39)	17,161	54–85	L2
140	September 7	@ Nationals	4–5 (11)	Latos (7–2)	**Bradley** (1–1)	—	19,894	54–86	L3
141	September 9	Mets	4–6	Robles (6–4)	**Cabrera** (3–1)	Familia (48)	28,225	54–87	L4
142	September 10	Mets	4–3 (10)	**Withrow** (3–0)	Goeddel (1–1)	—	47,841	55–87	W1
143	September 11	Mets	3–10	Lugo (4–2)	**Perez** (2–3)	—	32,829	55–88	L1
144	September 12	Marlins	12–7	**Roe** (1–0)	Ellington (2–2)	—	18,271	56–88	W1
145	September 13	Marlins	5–7	Nicolino (3–6)	**Wisler** (6–12)	Ramos (35)	20,125	56–89	L1
146	September 14	Marlins	5–7	Fernández (15–8)	**Teherán** (5–10)	Ramos (36)	21,498	56–90	L2
147	September 16	Nationals	2–7	Scherzer (17–7)	**Gant** (1–4)	—	33,618	56–91	L3
148	September 17	Nationals	7–3	**Collmenter** (2–0)	Gonzalez (11–10)	–	36,016	57–91	W1
149	September 18	Nationals	6–2 (7)	**Wisler** (7–12)	Ross (7–5)	–	37,296	58–91	W2
150	September 19	@ Mets	7–3	**Blair** (1–6)	Syndergaard (13–9)	—	29,655	59–91	W3
151	September 20	@ Mets	5–4	**Teherán** (6–10)	Gsellman (2–2)	**Johnson** (16)	30,764	60–91	W4
152	September 21	@ Mets	4–3	**Krol** (2–0)	Familia (3–4)	**Johnson** (17)	32,187	61–91	W5
153	September 22	@ Marlins	6–3	**Collmenter** (3–0)	Ureña (4–8)	**Cabrera** (5)	22,086	62–91	W6
154	September 23	@ Marlins	3–2	**Cunniff** (2–0)	Ramos (1–4)	**Cabrera** (6)	23,924	63–91	W7
155	September 24	@ Marlins	4–6	**Ellington** (4–2)	Blair (1–7)	**Ramos** (39)	26,178	63–92	L1
–	September 25	@ Marlins	Game cancelled (death of Marlins pitcher José Fernandez)						
156	September 27	Phillies	7–6	**Cabrera** (4–1)	Hernandez (3–4)	—	22,348	64–92	W1
157	September 28	Phillies	12–2	**Foltynewicz** (9–5)	Morgan (2–11)	—	22,104	65–92	W2
158	September 29	Phillies	5–2	**Cabrera** (5–1)	Gomez (3–5)	—	32,121	66–92	W3
159	September 30	Tigers	2–6	**Norris** (4–2)	Wisler (7–13)	—	41,500	66–93	L1

October: 2–0 (Home: 2–0; Away: 0–0)

#	Date	Opponent	Score	Win	Loss	Save	Attendance	Record	Box/Streak
160	October 1	Tigers	5–3	**Blair** (2–7)	Zimmermann (9–7)	**Johnson** (19)	40,124	67–93	W1
161	October 2	Tigers	1–0	**Teheran** (7–10)	Verlander (16–9)	**Johnson** (20)	51,220	68–93	W2

Legend: = Win = Loss = Postponement
Bold = Braves team member

== Roster ==
2016 Atlanta Braves
Roster
Pitchers: 39 Darío Álvarez; 36 Aaron Blair; 72 Jed Bradley; 62 Mauricio Cabrera; 54 Hunter Cervenka; 43 Jhoulys Chacín; 55 Josh Collmenter; 39 Brandon Cunniff; 36,60 Joel De La Cruz; 26 Mike Foltynewicz; 52 John Gant; 39 Jason Grilli; 63 Lucas Harrell; 32 Roberto Hernández; 67 Jason Hursh; 61 Tyrell Jenkins; 53 Jim Johnson; 55 Casey Kelly; 46 Ian Krol; 56 Matt Marksberry; 20 Bud Norris; 34 Eric O'Flaherty; 40 Alexi Ogando; 57 Williams Pérez; 36,40 José Ramírez; 50 Chaz Roe; 68 Shae Simmons; 49 Julio Teherán; 38 Arodys Vizcaíno; 48 Ryan Weber; 63 Robert Whalen; 58 Daniel Winkler; 37 Matt Wisler; 51 Chris Withrow; 54 Madison Younginer	Catchers: 25 Tyler Flowers; 15 A. J. Pierzynski; 20 Anthony Recker; Infielders: 1 Erick Aybar; 7 Gordon Beckham; 4 Reid Brignac; 14 Daniel Castro; 23 Chase d'Arnaud; 5 Freddie Freeman; 13 Adonis García; 24 Kelly Johnson; 74 Blake Lalli; 8 Jace Peterson; 32 Rio Ruiz; 19 Brandon Snyder; 2 Dansby Swanson	Outfielders: 64 Emilio Bonifacio; 18 Jeff Francoeur; 11 Ender Inciarte; 27 Matt Kemp; 22 Nick Markakis; 28 Héctor Olivera; 17 Mallex Smith; 2 Drew Stubbs; Other batters: 30 Matt Tuiasosopo	Manager: 33 Fredi González; 43 Brian Snitker; Coaches: 99,65 Alan Butts (bullpen catcher); 70 Buddy Carlyle (coaching assistant); 59 José Castro (assistant hitting); 45 Roger McDowell (pitching); 9 Terry Pendleton (first base) (bench); 12 Eddie Pérez (bullpen)(first base); 16 Bo Porter (third base); 62 Horacio Ramírez (assistant coach); 58 Marty Reed (bullpen); 27,28 Kevin Seitzer (hitting); 32 Carlos Tosca (bench); 71 José Yepez (bullpen catcher)

== Statistics ==
=== Batting ===
(Updated as of 10/2/16)

Players in bold are on the active major league roster as of the 2022 season.

Note: G = Games played; AB = At bats; R = Runs; H = Hits; 2B = Doubles; 3B = Triples; HR = Home runs; RBI = Runs batted in; Avg. = Batting average; OBP = On-base percentage; SLG = Slugging percentage; SB = Stolen bases

Player	G	AB	R	H	2B	3B	HR	RBI	AVG	OBP	SLG	SB
Erick Aybar	97	335	27	81	14	2	2	26	.242	.293	.313	3
Gordon Beckham	85	240	25	52	16	1	5	30	.217	.300	.354	1
Aaron Blair	15	21	0	1	0	0	0	0	.048	.048	.048	0
Emilio Bonifacio	24	38	6	8	0	0	0	3	.211	.268	.211	1
Reid Brignac	13	29	3	6	2	0	0	1	.207	.207	.276	0
Daniel Castro	47	130	8	26	1	0	0	7	.200	.241	.208	1
**Jhoulys Chacín**	5	8	0	2	0	0	0	1	.250	.250	.250	0
Josh Collmenter	3	6	0	0	0	0	0	0	.000	.000	.000	0
Chase d'Arnaud	84	233	24	57	14	2	1	21	.245	.317	.335	9
Joel De La Cruz	22	16	0	3	0	0	0	1	.188	.188	.188	0
Tyler Flowers	83	281	27	76	18	0	8	41	.270	.357	.420	0
Mike Foltynewicz	22	36	3	5	1	0	0	1	.139	.162	.167	0
Jeff Francoeur	99	257	29	64	13	0	7	33	.249	.290	.381	2
**Freddie Freeman**	158	589	102	178	43	6	34	91	.302	.400	.569	6
John Gant	20	7	0	0	0	0	0	0	.000	.000	.000	0
Adonis García	134	532	65	145	29	0	14	65	.273	.311	.406	3
Lucas Harrell	5	8	0	0	0	0	0	0	.000	.000	.000	0
Roberto Hernández	2	4	0	0	0	0	0	0	.000	.000	.000	0
**Ender Inciarte**	131	522	85	152	24	7	3	29	.291	.351	.381	16
Tyrell Jenkins	14	13	0	0	0	0	0	0	.000	.000	.000	0
Jim Johnson	65	1	0	0	0	0	0	0	.000	.000	.000	0
Kelly Johnson	49	121	8	26	6	0	1	10	.215	.273	.289	1
Casey Kelly	10	2	0	0	0	0	0	0	.000	.000	.000	0
Matt Kemp	56	214	35	60	15	0	12	39	.280	.336	.519	1
Ian Krol	63	1	0	0	0	0	0	0	.000	.000	.000	0
Blake Lalli	10	13	0	2	1	0	0	1	.154	.154	.231	0
Nick Markakis	158	599	67	161	38	0	13	89	.269	.346	.397	0
Bud Norris	22	12	1	2	0	1	0	0	.167	.375	.333	0
Héctor Olivera	6	19	2	4	1	0	0	2	.211	.238	.263	0
Williams Pérez	11	17	0	0	0	0	0	0	.000	.000	.000	0
**Jace Peterson**	115	350	45	89	16	1	7	29	.254	.350	.366	5
A. J. Pierzynski	81	247	15	54	15	0	2	23	.219	.243	.304	1
Anthony Recker	33	90	6	25	8	0	2	15	.278	.394	.433	1
Rio Ruiz	5	7	1	2	0	1	0	2	.286	.286	.571	1
Mallex Smith	72	189	28	45	7	4	3	22	.238	.316	.365	16
Brandon Snyder	37	46	8	11	5	1	4	9	.239	.255	.652	0
Drew Stubbs	20	38	6	9	0	0	1	3	.237	.310	.316	4
**Dansby Swanson**	38	129	20	39	7	1	3	17	.302	.361	.442	3
Julio Teherán	31	49	1	10	1	0	0	2	.204	.220	.224	0
Rob Whalen	5	10	0	2	0	0	0	0	.200	.200	.400	0
Matt Tuiasosopo	3	3	0	0	0	0	0	0	.000	.000	.000	0
**Ryan Weber**	16	6	0	0	0	0	0	0	.000	.000	.000	0
**Matt Wisler**	29	46	2	7	0	0	0	2	.152	.167	.152	0
**Team totals**	**161**	**5514**	**649**	**1404**	**295**	**27**	**122**	**615**	**.255**	**.321**	**.384**	**75**

=== Pitching ===
(Updated as of 10/2/16)

Players in bold are on the active major league roster as of 2022.

Note: W = Wins; L = Losses; ERA = Earned run average; G = Games pitched; GS = Games started; SV = Saves; IP = Innings pitched; R = Runs allowed; ER = Earned runs allowed; HR = Home runs allowed; BB = Walks allowed; K = Strikeouts

Player	W	L	ERA	G	GS	SV	IP	H	R	ER	HR	BB	K
Darío Álvarez	3	1	3.00	16	0	0	15.0	11	5	5	3	5	28
Aaron Blair	2	7	7.59	15	15	0	70.0	82	61	59	14	34	46
Jed Bradley	1	1	5.14	6	0	0	7.0	7	4	4	0	6	4
Mauricio Cabrera	5	1	2.82	41	0	6	38.1	31	14	12	0	19	32
Hunter Cervenka	1	0	3.18	50	0	6	34.0	20	14	12	2	23	35
**Jhoulys Chacín**	1	2	5.40	5	5	0	26.2	29	17	16	4	8	27
Josh Collmenter	2	0	2.37	3	3	0	19.0	15	5	5	3	5	16
Brandon Cunniff	2	0	4.24	15	0	0	17.0	14	9	8	2	9	16
Joel De La Cruz	0	7	4.88	22	9	0	62.2	65	40	34	10	22	37
Mike Foltynewicz	9	5	4.31	22	22	0	123.1	125	61	59	18	35	111
John Gant	1	4	4.86	20	7	0	50.0	54	32	27	7	21	49
Jason Grilli	1	2	5.29	21	0	2	17.0	16	11	10	2	13	23
Lucas Harrell	2	2	3.38	5	5	0	29.1	25	13	11	1	12	21
Roberto Hernández	1	1	8.00	2	2	0	9.0	13	8	8	4	1	6
Jason Hursh	0	0	33.75	2	0	0	1.1	4	5	5	0	3	1
Tyrell Jenkins	2	4	5.88	14	8	0	52.0	55	35	34	11	33	26
Jim Johnson	2	6	3.06	65	0	20	64.2	57	23	22	3	20	68
Casey Kelly	0	3	5.82	10	1	0	21.2	30	14	14	1	7	7
Ian Krol	2	0	3.18	63	0	0	51.0	54	19	18	4	13	56
Matt Marksberry	0	0	5.40	4	0	0	3.1	5	2	2	1	1	2
Bud Norris	3	7	4.22	22	10	0	70.1	68	34	33	6	28	60
Eric O'Flaherty	1	4	6.91	39	0	0	28.2	39	25	22	3	11	22
Alexi Ogando	2	1	3.94	36	0	0	32.0	32	18	14	2	23	29
Williams Pérez	2	3	6.04	11	11	0	53.2	57	37	36	7	15	27
José Ramírez	2	2	3.58	33	0	0	32.2	26	16	13	2	18	33
Chaz Roe	1	0	3.60	21	0	0	20.0	14	8	8	0	7	26
Shae Simmons	0	0	1.35	7	0	0	6.2	6	1	1	0	0	3
Julio Teherán	7	10	3.21	30	30	0	188.0	157	70	67	22	41	167
**Arodys Vizcaíno**	1	4	4.42	43	0	10	38.2	37	25	19	3	26	50
**Ryan Weber**	1	1	5.45	16	2	0	36.1	46	22	22	7	5	23
Rob Whalen	1	2	6.57	5	5	0	24.2	20	20	18	4	12	25
Daniel Winkler	0	0	0.00	3	0	0	2.1	0	0	0	0	1	4
**Matt Wisler**	7	13	5.00	27	26	1	156.2	159	90	87	26	49	115
Chris Withrow	3	0	3.58	46	0	0	37.2	29	16	15	5	17	28
Madison Younginer	0	0	6.43	8	0	0	7.0	12	5	5	0	4	4
**Team totals**	**68**	**93**	**4.51**	**161**	**161**	**39**	**1447.2**	**1414**	**779**	**725**	**177**	**547**	**1227**

== Farm system ==
Level	Team	League	Manager
AAA	Gwinnett Braves	International League	Brian Snitker and John Moses
AA	Mississippi Braves	Southern League	Luis Salazar
A-Advanced	Carolina Mudcats	Carolina League	Rocket Wheeler
A	Rome Braves	South Atlantic League	Randy Ingle
Rookie	Danville Braves	Appalachian League	Robinson Cancel
Rookie	GCL Braves	Arizona League	Nestor Perez
Rookie	DSL Braves	Dominican Summer League	Francisco Santiesteban

LEAGUE CHAMPIONS: Rome
