= Brian Snyder =

American baseball player (born 1958)

- Pitcher
- Born: February 20, 1958 (age 68); Flemington, New Jersey, U.S.
- Batted: Left Threw: Left

MLB debut
- May 25, 1985, for the Seattle Mariners

Last MLB appearance
- June 27, 1989, for the Oakland Athletics

MLB statistics
- Win–loss record: 1–2
- Earned run average: 6.75
- Strikeouts: 24
- Stats at Baseball Reference

Teams
- Seattle Mariners (1985); Oakland Athletics (1989)

Brian Robert Snyder (born February 20, 1958) is an American former professional baseball pitcher for the Seattle Mariners and Oakland Athletics of Major League Baseball (MLB).

The Texas Rangers selected Snyder in the 16th round of the 1976 MLB draft from Chantilly High School in Chantilly, Virginia, but he did but sign. He played college baseball for the Clemson Tigers. He threw a no-hitter against the UNC Wilmington Seahawks in 1977 and pitched for the U.S. national team in the 1979 Pan American Games.

The Mariners selected Snyder in the seventh round of the 1979 MLB draft. He became a relief pitcher in 1981, then reached Triple-A in 1982. He made his MLB debut in May 1985, pitching in 15 games, including six starts, for Seattle.

After his debut MLB season, Snyder returned to the minors, signing with the San Diego Padres ahead of the 1986 season. Two seasons later, he signed with the Athletics, pitching his seventh year in the Triple-A Pacific Coast League in 1988. Snyder returned to the majors with Oakland in 1989, allowing two runs in 2/3 of an inning. He pitched a final season in Triple-A in 1990.

== Personal life ==
Snyder's son, Brandon Snyder, played in MLB from 2010 to 2018. His nephew, Madison Younginer, pitched in MLB in 2016.

Snyder mentored Bobby Wahl while Wahl attended high school.
