= Darío Álvarez =

Dominican baseball player (born 1989)

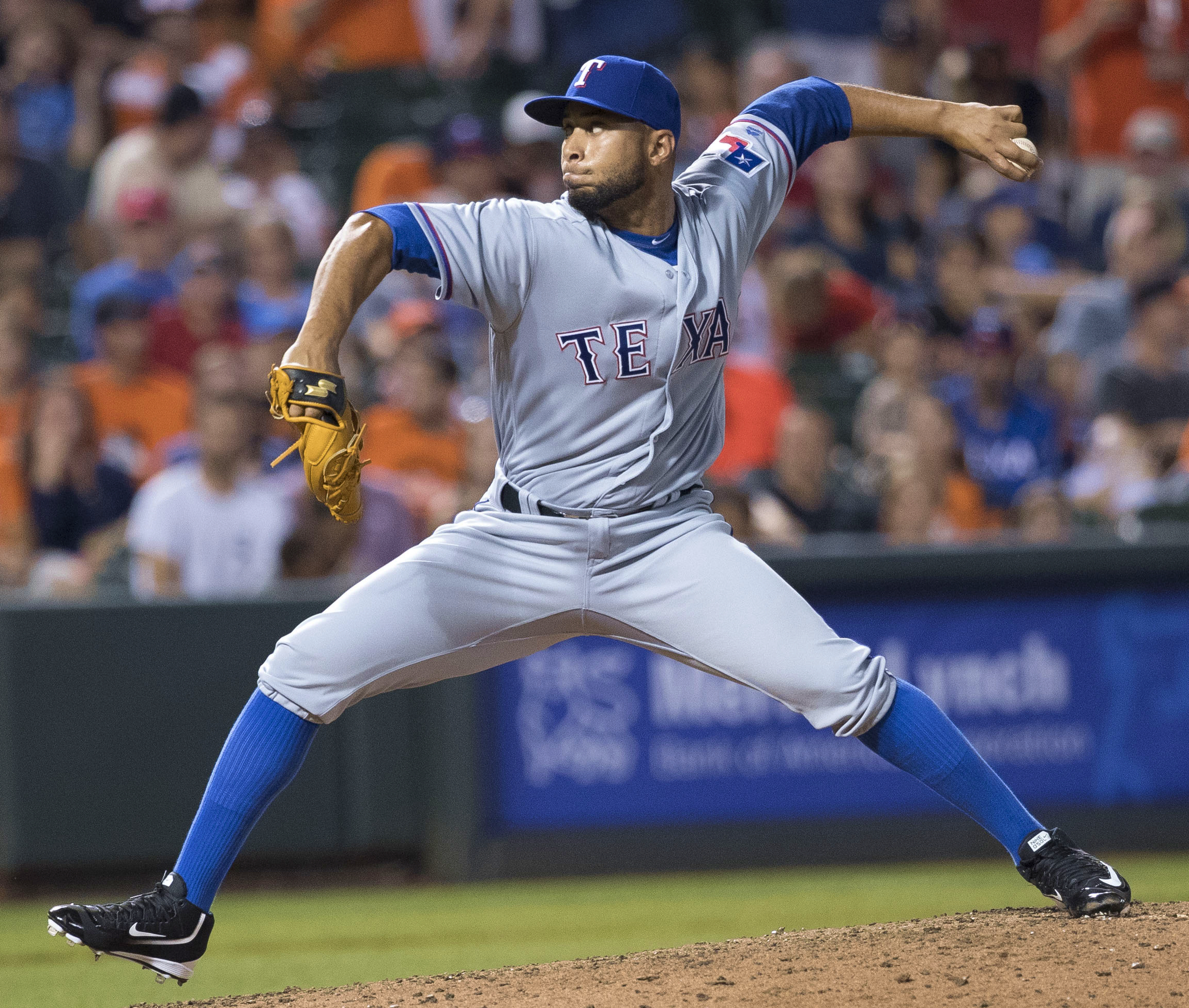
- Álvarez with the Texas Rangers in 2016
- Pitcher
- Born: January 17, 1989 (age 37); Santiago, Dominican Republic
- Batted: Left Threw: Left

MLB debut
- September 3, 2014, for the New York Mets

Last MLB appearance
- June 28, 2017, for the Texas Rangers

MLB statistics
- Win–loss record: 6–1
- Earned run average: 5.06
- Strikeouts: 61
- Stats at Baseball Reference

Teams
- New York Mets (2014–2015); Atlanta Braves (2016); Texas Rangers (2016–2017)
Medals
Men's baseball
Representing Dominican Republic
Olympic Games
Bronze medal – third place	2020 Tokyo	Team

Darío Rafael Álvarez Espinal (born January 17, 1989) is a Dominican former professional baseball pitcher. He has previously played in Major League Baseball (MLB) for the New York Mets, Atlanta Braves, and Texas Rangers.

== Career ==
=== Philadelphia Phillies ===
Álvarez signed with the Philadelphia Phillies as an amateur free agent on January 8, 2007. From 2007 to 2009 he played entirely with the Dominican Summer League Phillies. In 2007, Álvarez finished with a 1–3 record, 4.46 ERA in 11 games. In 2008, he finished with a 4–2 record, 3.23 ERA in 18 games. In 2009, he finished with a 3–4 record, 2.59 ERA in 14 games. On August 18, 2009, he was released by the Phillies.

=== New York Mets ===
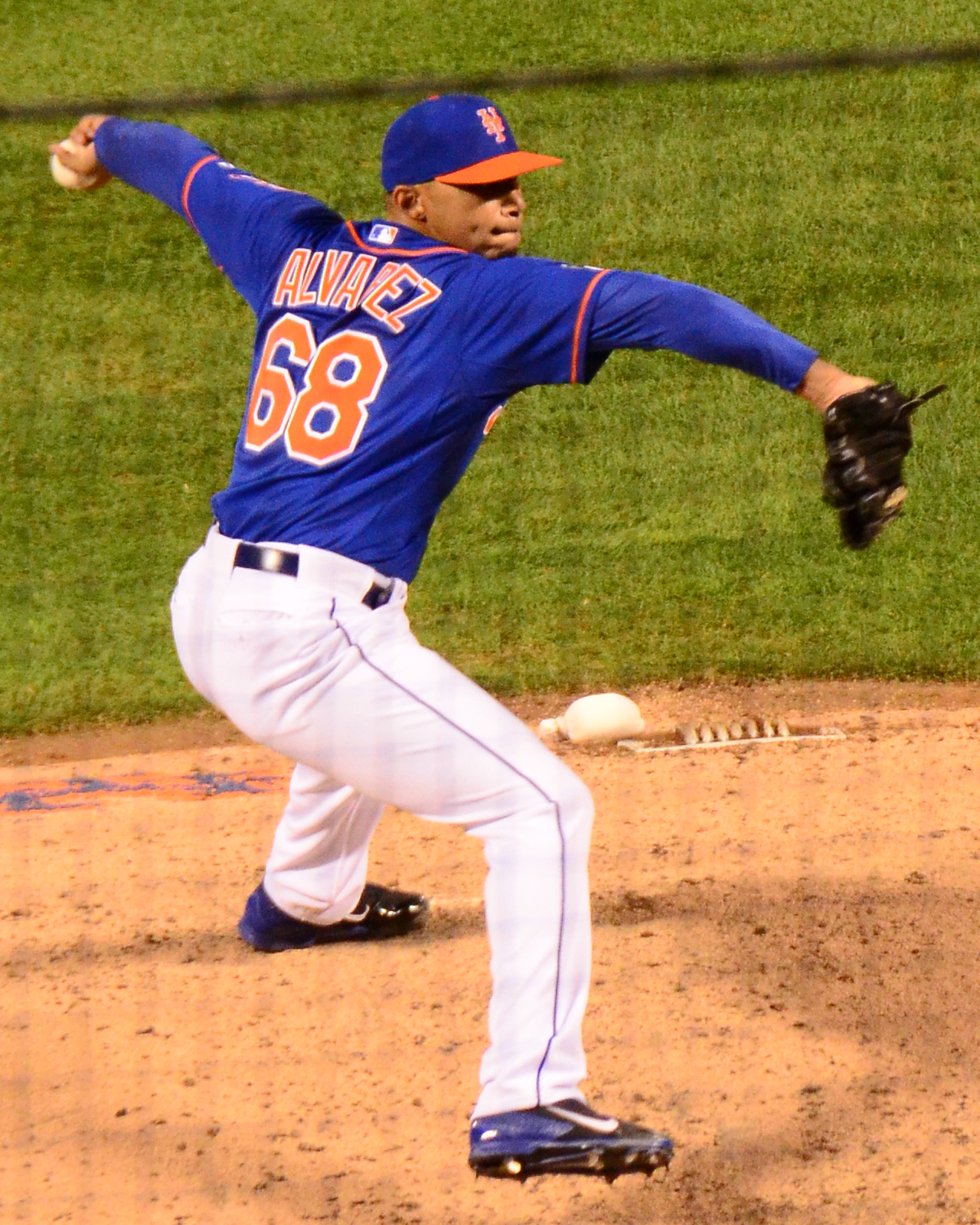
Álvarez with the New York Mets in 2014

On January 13, 2013, Álvarez was signed a minor league contract with the New York Mets organization after spending the 2010 through 2012 seasons out of baseball. He spent the 2013 season with the Low-A Brooklyn Cyclones, recording a 2–4 record and 3.10 ERA in 12 appearances. He split the majority of the 2014 season between the Single-A Savannah Sand Gnats, the High-A St. Lucie Mets, and the Double-A Binghamton Mets, accumulating a 10–1 record and 1.10 ERA with 114 strikeouts in 73 1/3 innings of work.

Álvarez was selected to the 40-man roster and called up to the majors for the first time on September 1, 2014. He made his major league debut on September 3 against the Miami Marlins. The Mets won the game 4–3, with Alvarez giving up an RBI single to Christian Yelich which the tied the game for the Marlins, charging Álvarez with a blown save. Álvarez finished his rookie season with a 13.50 ERA in four games in 1 1/3 innings pitched while giving up four hits, two runs, and one home run while only getting one strikeout with a WHIP of 3.000.

Álvarez began the 2015 season with Binghamton, and after being named a mid-season All-Star, he was promoted to the Triple-A Las Vegas 51s. Álvarez was recalled to the majors on August 22 when first baseman Lucas Duda was placed on the disable list with a back injury. On August 23, he was optioned back to the Triple-A to make room for David Wright, who was making his return from spinal stenosis. Álvarez did not make a single appearance when he was called up a day earlier.

Álvarez was recalled on September 4 to be available to pitch against the Miami Marlins. On September 7, Álvarez earned his first career win against the Washington Nationals by striking out outfielder Bryce Harper in the bottom of the sixth inning. On September 15, Álvarez strained his groin with one out in the eight inning against the Marlins forcing him to leave in what would be a 3–9 loss for the Mets. He had allowed 3 hits and exited the game after stumbling and failing to deliver a pitch, which resulted in a balk. On September 18 it was revealed that Álvarez was headed to Port St. Lucie to rehab the groin injury he had sustained three days ago and that it was unlikely for him to pitch again in 2015.

Álvarez finished the season with a 1–0 record, 12.27 ERA in six games in 3 2/3 innings pitched while giving up five hits, five runs, two home runs, one walk, and one balk while getting two strikeouts with a WHIP of 1.636. He was assigned to Las Vegas to begin the 2016 season. On May 23, 2016, Álvarez was designated for assignment by the Mets.

=== Atlanta Braves ===
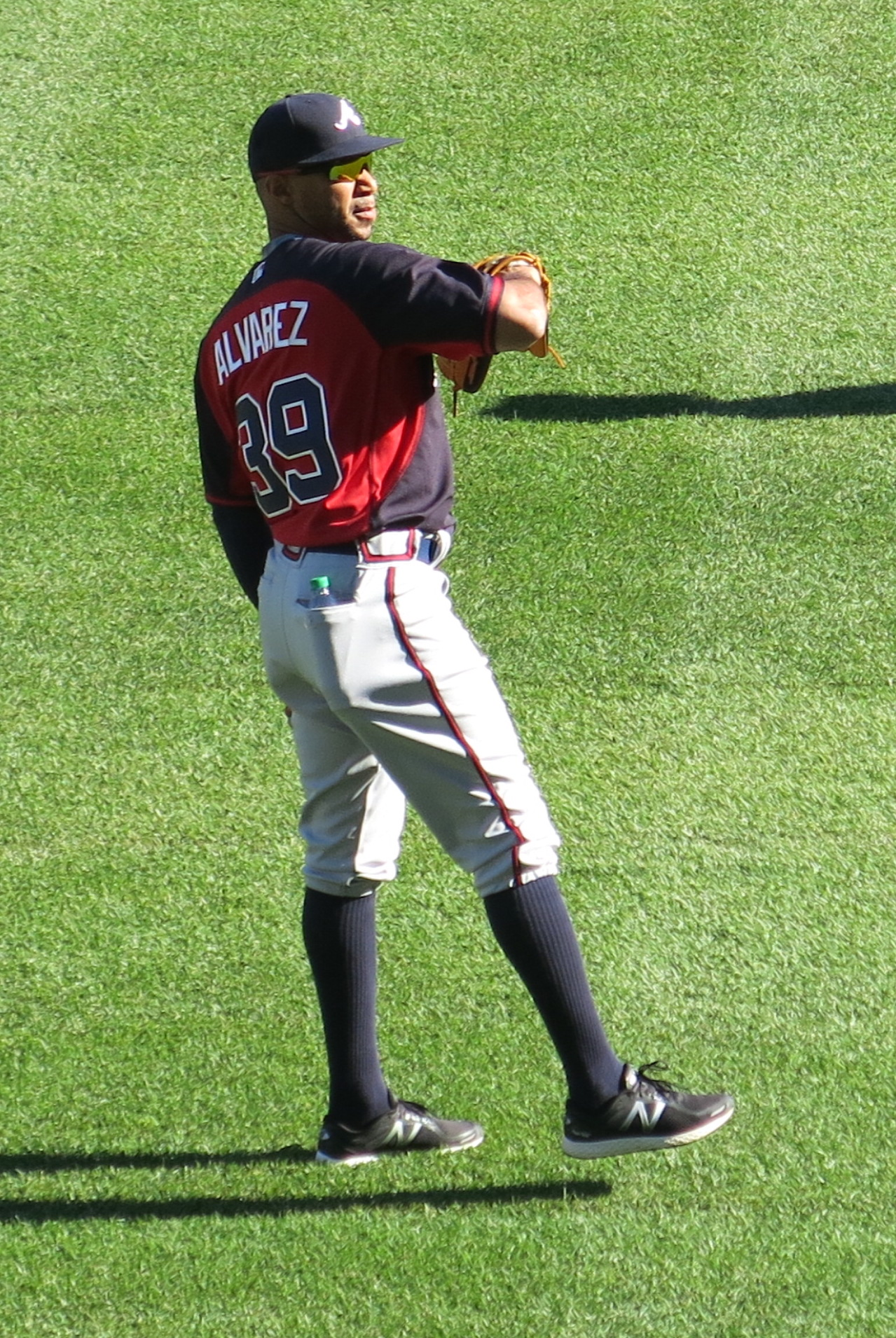
Álvarez during his tenure with the Atlanta Braves in 2016

On May 25, 2016, Álvarez was claimed off waivers by the Atlanta Braves. He was optioned to the Triple–A Gwinnett Braves, and logged a 1.13 ERA in 8 appearances for the team. On June 14, Álvarez was promoted to Atlanta. In 16 major league games, he posted a 3–1 record and 3.00 ERA in 16 appearances for the Braves.

=== Texas Rangers ===
On July 27, 2016, the Braves traded Álvarez and Lucas Harrell to the Texas Rangers in exchange for Travis Demeritte. After two appearances with the Rangers, he was demoted to the Triple-A Round Rock Express on August 4. In 10 appearances with the Rangers, Álvarez struggled to a 7.71 ERA in 10 appearances. He began the 2017 season with Triple-A Round Rock, and pitched to a 2–0 record and 2.76 ERA in 20 appearances with Texas. On September 1, 2017, Álvarez was designated for assignment by the Rangers. He elected free agency following the season on November 6.

=== Seattle Mariners ===
On November 30, 2017, Álvarez signed a one-year contract with the Chicago Cubs.

On March 21, 2018, Álvarez was claimed off waivers by the Seattle Mariners. On April 25, Álvarez was outrighted off of the 40-man roster without appearing in a game for Seattle and was assigned to the Triple-A Tacoma Rainiers. In 30 games for Tacoma, the Low-A Everett AquaSox, and rookie-level Arizona League Mariners, Álvarez recorded a 3–0 record and 1.78 ERA before being released by the organization on August 3.

=== Leones de Yucatán ===
On January 10, 2019, Alvarez signed a minor league deal with the Minnesota Twins organization. He was released by the organization prior to the start of the regular season on March 27.

On May 17, 2019, Álvarez signed with the Leones de Yucatán of the Mexican League. After struggling to a 17.18 ERA in two appearances with the team, he was released on May 31.

=== Algodoneros de Unión Laguna ===
On June 10, 2021, Álvarez signed with the Algodoneros de Unión Laguna of the Mexican League. In 17 games for Unión Laguna, he recorded a 5.14 ERA with 24 strikeouts and two saves across 21 innings. Álvarez was released by the Algodoneros on January 19, 2022.

=== Guelph Royals ===
On February 3, 2022, Álvarez signed with the Guelph Royals of the Intercounty Baseball League. However, due to visa issues, he was unable to join the team in 2022. On March 8, 2023, Álvarez re–signed with the Royals. He only appeared in two games for the team in 2023, and was released by Guelph on March 22, 2024.
