= Williams Pérez =

Venezuelan baseball player (born 1991)

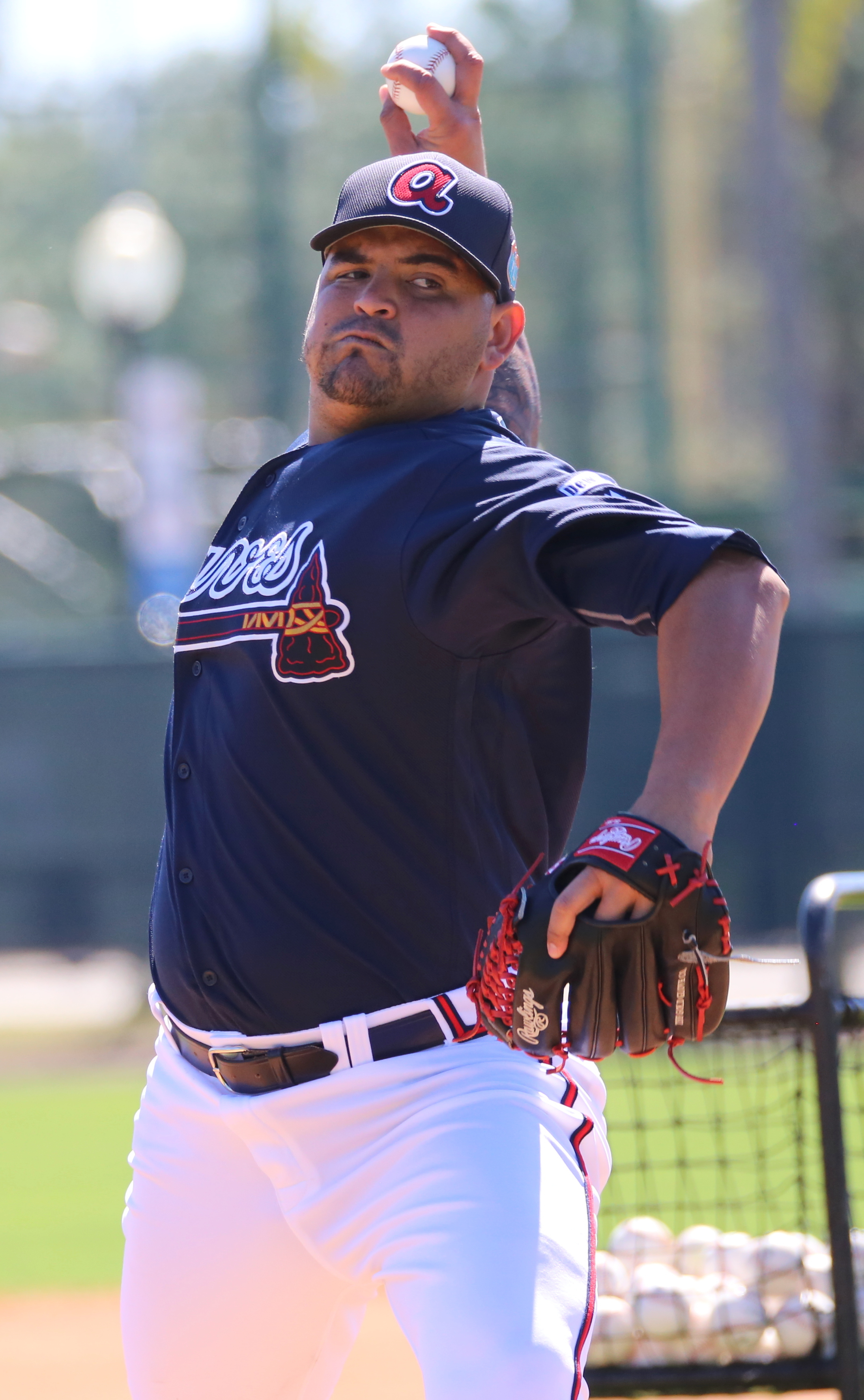
- Pérez with the Atlanta Braves in 2016 spring training
- Pitcher
- Born: May 21, 1991 (age 35); Acarigua, Portuguesa, Venezuela
- Batted: Right Threw: Right

MLB debut
- May 8, 2015, for the Atlanta Braves

Last MLB appearance
- September 11, 2016, for the Atlanta Braves

MLB statistics
- Win–loss record: 9–9
- Earned run average: 5.18
- Strikeouts: 100
- Stats at Baseball Reference

Teams
- Atlanta Braves (2015–2016)

Williams David Pérez Montes (born May 21, 1991) is a Venezuelan former professional baseball pitcher. Pérez signed with the Atlanta Braves as an amateur free agent in 2009. He has previously played in Major League Baseball (MLB) for the Braves from 2015 to 2016.

== Career ==
=== Atlanta Braves ===
Pérez signed with the Atlanta Braves as an amateur free agent on May 22, 2009. He made his professional debut with the Dominican Summer League Braves, posting a 2.35 ERA in 17 games. In 2010, Pérez pitched for the rookie-level GCL Braves, registering an 0-6 record and 5.63 ERA in 12 games, 11 of them starts. The following season, Pérez split the year between the GCL Braves and the rookie-level Danville Braves, accumulating a 4-0 record and 2.75 ERA in 13 appearances. In 2012, Pérez returned to Danville, where he posted a 4-3 record and 4.15 ERA with 54 strikeouts in 56.1 innings of work. The next year, he split the season between the Single-A Rome Braves and the High-A Lynchburg Hillcats, pitching to a cumulative 11-6 record and 3.53 ERA with 106 strikeouts in 125.0 innings pitched. He spent the entire 2014 season with the Double-A Mississippi Braves, recording a 7-6 record and 2.91 ERA in 26 appearances.

The Braves added Pérez to the team's 40-man roster on November 19, 2014. He was assigned to the Triple-A Gwinnett Braves to begin the 2015 season. Pérez was promoted to the major leagues for the first time on May 6, 2015. Pérez debuted two days later, yielding two walks, two hits and four runs, while recording one out against the Washington Nationals. He was then added to the starting rotation and made his first start, a no decision against the Tampa Bay Rays, on May 20, 2015. Pérez made a total of 14 starts in his rookie season. In his first eight starts, he recorded a 2.27 ERA, then was placed on the disabled list in July with a bruised left foot. Upon his return to the active roster, Pérez made six more starts, in which his ERA was 9.87, before being demoted to Triple-A Gwinnett on August 29.

Pérez opened the 2016 season in the Braves starting rotation and made three appearances before he was optioned to Gwinnett on April 20. He was recalled on May 11, and earned the win in that night's game against the Philadelphia Phillies. While facing the San Diego Padres on June 6, Pérez pitched five innings and left the game with an injury. Two days later, he was diagnosed with a rotator cuff strain and was placed on the disabled list. He was reactivated on September 6 to start against the Washington Nationals. After losing to the Nationals, Pérez was removed from his next start against the New York Mets in the midst of the third inning. He finished the year with a 2-3 record and 6.04 ERA in 11 games. On December 8, 2016, Pérez was released by the Braves.

=== Chicago Cubs ===
On February 4, 2017, Pérez signed a minor league contract with the Chicago Cubs organization. He spent the season with the Triple-A Iowa Cubs, pitching to a 7-10 record and 5.01 ERA with 102 strikeouts in 120.1 innings of work. He elected free agency following the season on November 6, 2017. On November 20, Pérez re-signed with the Cubs on a new a minor league contract and received an invitation to spring training. On February 18, 2018, the Cubs released Pérez.

=== Southern Illinois Miners ===
On April 9, 2018, Pérez signed with the Southern Illinois Miners of the independent Frontier League. Pérez made two appearances for the Miners in 2018, and pitched to a 1.64 ERA, allowing two earned runs and striking out 10 in 11 innings of work.

=== Seattle Mariners ===
On June 5, 2018, Pérez signed a minor league contract with the Seattle Mariners organization. He spent the year split between the Double-A Arkansas Travelers and the Triple-A Tacoma Rainiers, registering an 8-2 record and 2.47 ERA in 17 games between the two teams. Pérez elected free agency following the season on November 2.

=== St. Louis Cardinals ===
On November 12, 2018, Pérez signed a minor league contract with the St. Louis Cardinals organization. He split the 2019 season between the rookie-level Gulf Coast League Cardinals, High-A Palm Beach Cardinals, and Double-A Springfield Cardinals, accumulating a 6-3 record and 5.02 ERA with 81 strikeouts in 75 1/3 innings between the three levels. Pérez elected free agency after the season on November 4, 2019.

=== Toros de Tijuana ===
On May 20, 2021, Pérez signed with the Toros de Tijuana of the Mexican League. In seven appearances with Tijuana, Pérez recorded a 2-1 record and 6.75 ERA with 26 strikeouts over 28 innings of work.

=== Diablos Rojos del México ===
On July 4, 2021, Pérez was traded to the Diablos Rojos del México of the Mexican League. He made just one start for the club, giving up five hits and one earned run in four innings.

On July 19, 2021, Pérez was traded to the Guerreros de Oaxaca of the Mexican League. He was released without making an appearance for the team on November 23.

=== Tecolotes de los Dos Laredos ===
On May 5, 2022, Pérez signed with the Tecolotes de los Dos Laredos of the Mexican League. In 14 starts for Dos Laredos, he compiled a 4-5 record and 5.28 ERA with 67 strikeouts across 61 1/3 innings pitched. Pérez became a free agent following the season.

On January 4, 2023, Perez signed with the Saraperos de Saltillo. However, he was released on February 25, prior to the start of the season.

== Scouting report ==
Pérez primarily throws three pitches: a sinker, curveball, and changeup. All three offerings have a tendency to sink. Despite this, during his first season, Pérez gave up more fly balls on the latter two pitches than other pitchers did. During his minor league career, however, Pérez was known as a ground ball pitcher. Perez has continued to be a ground-ball pitcher at the major-league level, posting a ground-ball rate of 50.9% in 2015, compared to a league-average rate of 45.3%.

== Personal life ==
On February 9, 2018, Pérez was arrested in Venezuela after he shot and killed Cesar Quintero, his 52-year old coach. The shooting was accidental and police ruled out foul play.

== See also ==
- List of Major League Baseball players from Venezuela
