= Brandon Snyder =

American baseball player (born 1986)

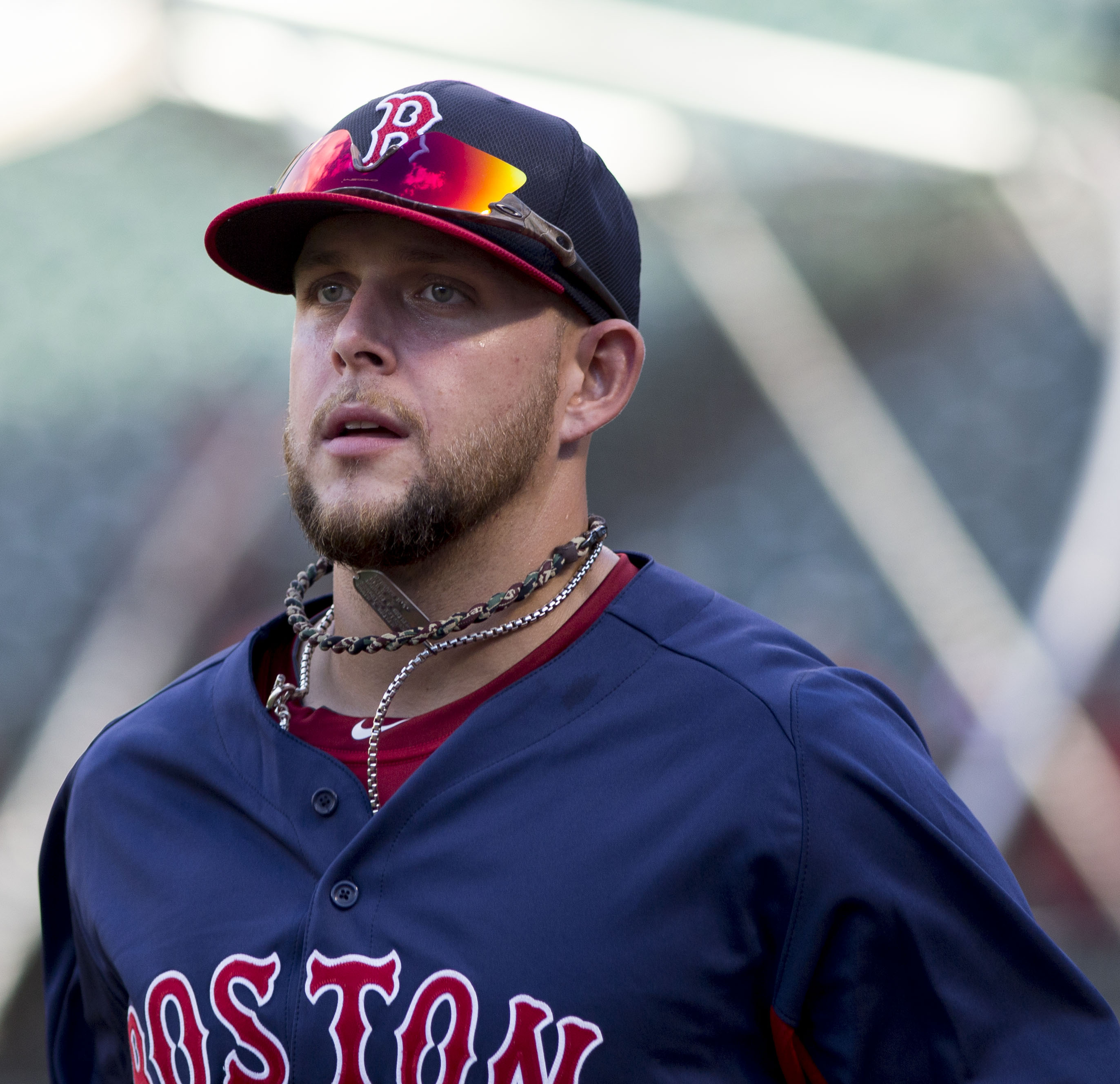
- Snyder with the Boston Red Sox in 2013
- Infielder
- Born: November 23, 1986 (age 39); Las Vegas Valley, Nevada, U.S.
- Batted: Right Threw: Right

MLB debut
- September 10, 2010, for the Baltimore Orioles

Last MLB appearance
- April 18, 2018, for the Tampa Bay Rays

MLB statistics
- Batting average: .240
- Home runs: 9
- Runs batted in: 29
- Stats at Baseball Reference

Teams
- Baltimore Orioles (2010–2011); Texas Rangers (2012); Boston Red Sox (2013); Atlanta Braves (2016); Tampa Bay Rays (2018)

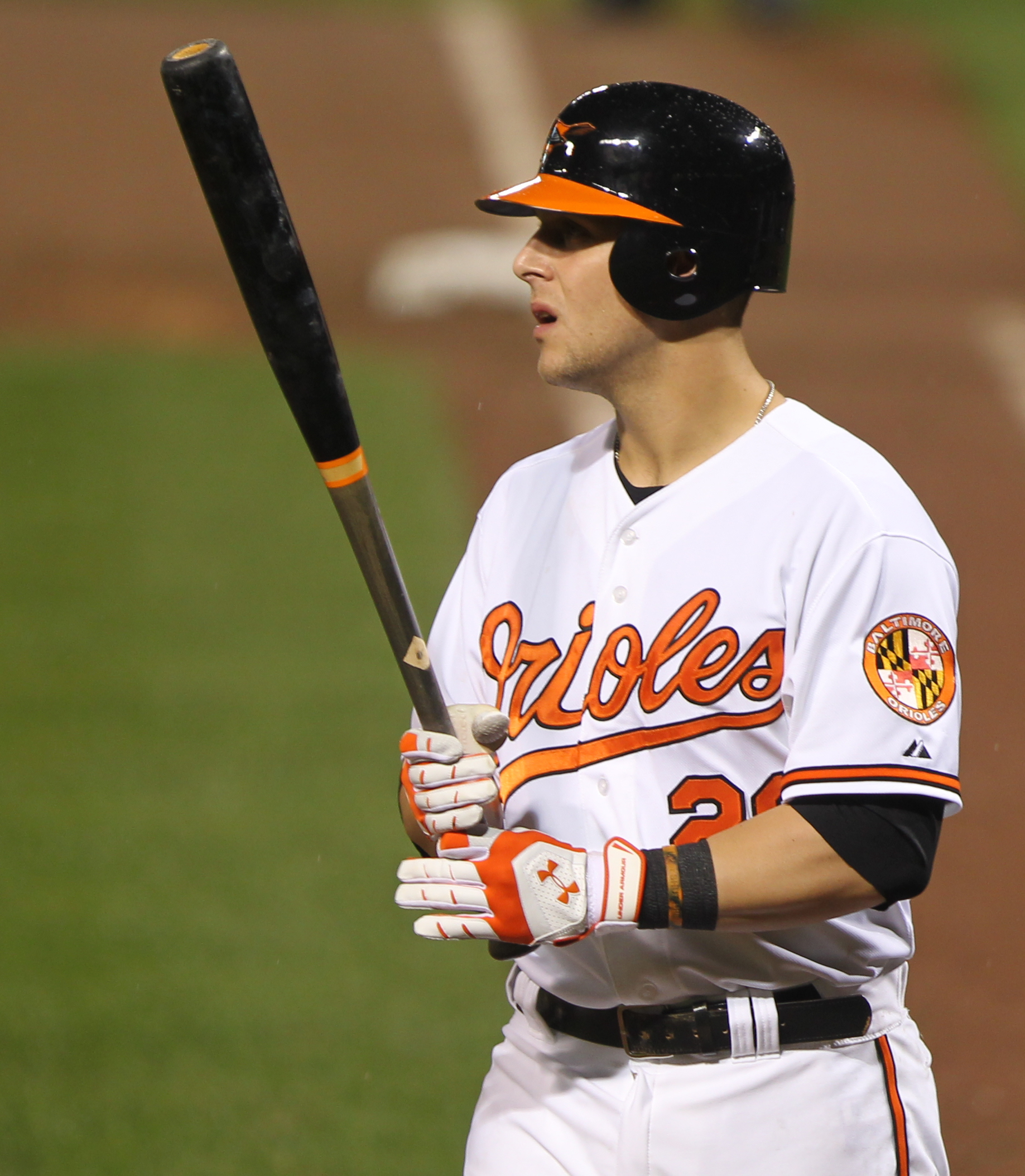
Snyder during his tenure with the Baltimore Orioles in 2011

Brandon Roger Snyder (born November 23, 1986) is an American former professional baseball utility player. He played in Major League Baseball (MLB) for the Baltimore Orioles, Texas Rangers, Boston Red Sox, Atlanta Braves, and Tampa Bay Rays. He was a bullpen catcher with the Washington Nationals from 2021 to 2023.

== Career ==
Snyder attended Westfield High School in Chantilly, Virginia.

=== Baltimore Orioles ===
The Baltimore Orioles selected Snyder in the first round, with the thirteenth overall selection, of the 2005 MLB draft.

Snyder made his MLB debut on September 10, 2010, against the Detroit Tigers. He came in as a defensive replacement in the 9th inning. His first Major League hit, an RBI single, came in the second inning on September 13, 2010, against Toronto Blue Jays pitcher Marc Rzepczynski.

Snyder played six games in two separate stints with the Orioles in 2011.

=== Texas Rangers ===
On January 3, 2012, Snyder was traded to the Texas Rangers for cash considerations. He made the Rangers' major-league roster as a backup first baseman and outfielder.

On May 2, 2012, Snyder hit his first Major League home run against Toronto Blue Jays starter Ricky Romero at the Rogers Centre.

On August 2, 2012, Snyder was optioned to Triple-A Round Rock to make room for third baseman Mike Olt.

On December 12, 2012, the Rangers announced that Snyder had signed a minor league contract with an invitation to major league spring training. He was released on March 27, 2013.

=== Boston Red Sox ===
On March 31, 2013, Snyder signed a minor-league contract with the Pawtucket Red Sox. His contract was purchased by the Red Sox on June 25, 2013, to take the roster spot of Will Middlebrooks, who was optioned to the minors. Brandon received a World Series ring for his contributions to the Sox in the season. He hit .180 with 2 home runs and 7 RBI's and 2 doubles in 27 games. Snyder re-signed with the Sox in November, accepting a minor league contract with an invitation to spring training. His contract expired after the 2014 season.

=== Baltimore Orioles (Second Stint) ===
Snyder signed a minor league deal with the Baltimore Orioles on April 27, 2015.

=== Atlanta Braves ===
On November 26, 2015, Snyder signed a minor league contract with the Atlanta Braves organization. On June 2, he was called up to replace the injured Gordon Beckham. On August 7, the Braves designated Snyder for assignment. On August 9, he was recalled and optioned to Gwinnett by the Braves.

=== Washington Nationals ===
On November 17, 2016, Snyder signed a minor league deal with the Washington Nationals. He spent the 2017 season with the Triple–A Syracuse Chiefs, playing in 121 games and batting .263/.356/.490 with 23 home runs and 77 RBI. Snyder elected free agency following the season on November 6, 2017.

=== Tampa Bay Rays ===
On December 14, 2017, Snyder signed a minor league contract with the Tampa Bay Rays. He was designated for assignment on April 20, 2018. He elected free agency on October 2.

=== Washington Nationals (second stint) ===
On January 8, 2019, Snyder signed a minor league contract with the Washington Nationals. In 117 games for the Triple–A Fresno Grizzlies, he batted .257/.314/.537 with 31 home runs and 80 RBI. Snyder elected free agency following the season on November 4.

On February 12, 2020, it was announced that Snyder had re–signed with the Nationals on a new minor league contract. He did not play in a game in 2020 due to the cancellation of the minor league season because of the COVID-19 pandemic. Snyder once again re-signed with the organization on a minor league contract on November 2, 2020.

After several months playing for the Triple–A Rochester Red Wings, Snyder was added to the Nationals' "taxi squad" during a series in Milwaukee in August 2021, shifting into a player-coach role as the team's bullpen catcher, after Brett Austin took a job coaching at North Carolina State University and Henry Blanco temporarily shifted from bullpen coach to bench coach. Snyder officially announced his retirement as a player on October 2, 2021, while continuing to serve as the Nationals' bullpen catcher.

== Personal life ==
Snyder is the son of former major league pitcher Brian Snyder. Snyder's first cousin, Madison Younginer, was also a professional baseball player.

== See also ==
- List of second-generation Major League Baseball players
