= Mauricio Cabrera =

Dominican baseball player (born 1993)

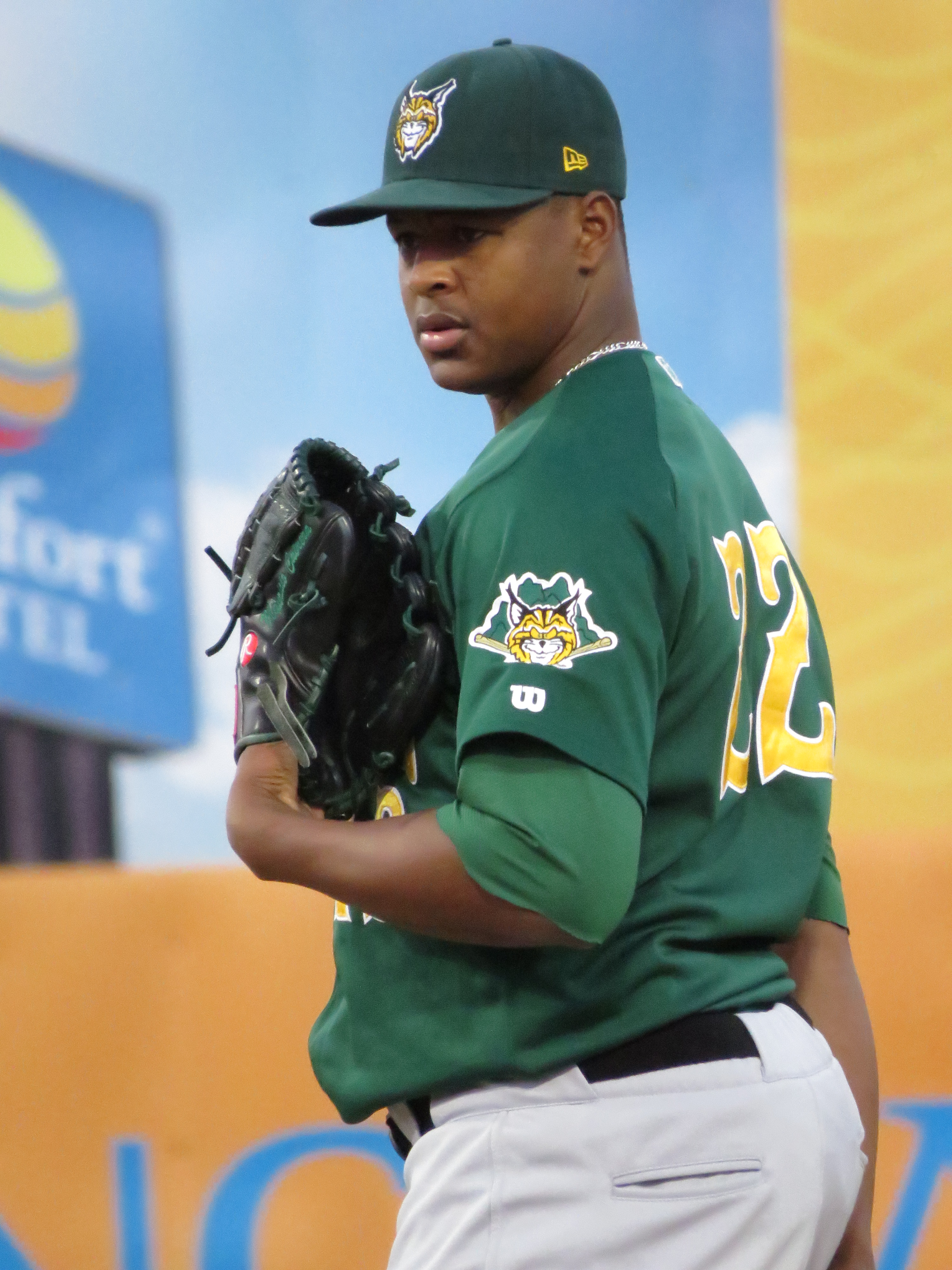
- Cabrera with the Lynchburg Hillcats in 2014

Free agent
- Pitcher
- Born: September 22, 1993 (age 32); Las Matas de Farfán, San Juan, Dominican Republic
- Bats: Right Throws: Right

MLB debut
- June 27, 2016, for the Atlanta Braves

MLB statistics (through 2016 season)
- Win–loss record: 5–1
- Earned run average: 2.82
- Strikeouts: 32
- Stats at Baseball Reference

Teams
- Atlanta Braves (2016)

Mauricio Adolfo Cabrera Valdez (born September 22, 1993) is a Dominican professional baseball pitcher who is a free agent. He has previously played in Major League Baseball (MLB) for the Atlanta Braves.

== Career ==
=== Atlanta Braves ===
Cabrera signed with the Atlanta Braves as an international free agent in July 2010. He made his professional debut the following season with the Dominican Summer League Braves, logging a 1–5 record and 4.30 ERA in 19 appearances. In 2012, Cabrera played for the rookie ball Danville Braves, recording a 2.97 ERA in 12 games. He spent the 2013 season with the Single-A Rome Braves, posting a 3–8 record and a 4.18 ERA in 24 appearances. The next year, he split the season between the GCL Braves and the High-A Lynchburg Hillcats, pitching to a 5.73 ERA with 31 strikeouts in 33.0 innings of work. The Braves added Cabrera to the team's 40-man roster on November 19, 2014.

Cabrera spent the 2015 season with the High-A Carolina Mudcats and also made 13 appearances for the Double-A Mississippi Braves, accumulating a 5.59 ERA in 36 appearances. Cabrera participated in the Arizona Fall League after the season. The Braves promoted Cabrera to the major leagues for the first time on June 27, 2016. He made his major league debut that day against the Cleveland Indians, pitching one inning, in which he yielded one hit. Three days later, Cabrera recorded his first career save against the Miami Marlins. He finished his rookie season with a 5–1 record with 6 saves and a 2.82 ERA. His four-seam fastball had the second-highest average speed of any MLB pitcher's pitches in 2016, at 100.4 mph.

Cabrera suffered a strained right elbow in spring training in 2017, and began the season on the disabled list. He spent the entire season in the minors, mainly with the Triple-A Gwinnett Braves, where he struggled to a 7.86 ERA and 20 strikeouts in 24 games. On February 19, 2018, Cabrera was designated for assignment following the signing of Peter Moylan. He was outrighted to Triple-A Gwinnett on February 20 and invited to spring training as a non-roster invitee. After stumbling to an 11.03 ERA in 31 games for the High-A Florida Fire Frogs, Cabrera was released by the organization on July 11, 2018.

=== Chicago White Sox ===
On July 20, 2018, Cabrera signed a minor league contract with the Chicago White Sox. He spent the remainder of the year in the White Sox's minor league system, spending time with the rookie-level Arizona League White Sox, where he struggled to a 11.00 ERA in nine games, and the Double-A Birmingham Barons, where he put up a ghastly 20.25 ERA in two appearances. Cabrera returned to Birmingham for the 2019 season, logging a 4–3 record and 4.50 ERA and 67 strikeouts across 48 innings of work. He elected free agency following the season on November 4, 2019.

=== Arizona Diamondbacks ===
On November 14, 2019, Cabrera signed a minor league contract with the Arizona Diamondbacks. He did not play in a game in 2020 due to the cancellation of the minor league season because of the COVID-19 pandemic. Cabrera was released by the Diamondbacks organization on May 22, 2020.

=== Guerreros de Oaxaca ===
On June 3, 2021, Cabrera signed with the Guerreros de Oaxaca of the Mexican League. Cabrera struggled to a 13.50 ERA in three appearances for Oaxaca before being released on June 15.

On March 21, 2024, Cabrera signed with the Lexington Legends of the Atlantic League of Professional Baseball. He was released prior to the season on April 1.

=== Conspiradores de Querétaro ===
On May 12, 2025, Cabrera signed with the Conspiradores de Querétaro of the Mexican League. In two appearances for Querétaro, he recorded a 4.91 ERA with two strikeouts across 3 2/3 innings pitched. Cabrera was released by the Conspiradores on May 16.

=== Tigres de Quintana Roo ===
On July 9, 2025, Cabrera signed with the Tigres de Quintana Roo of the Mexican League. He did not appear in a game for Quintana Roo in 2025. Cabrera was released by the Tigres on April 30, 2026.

== Scouting report ==
Cabrera's fastball has been recorded by Statcast at 103.8 miles per hour (167.0 km/h).

== Personal life ==
His brother, Alberto Cabrera, played baseball professionally for the Chicago Cubs.
