= Aaron Blair =

American baseball pitcher (born 1992)

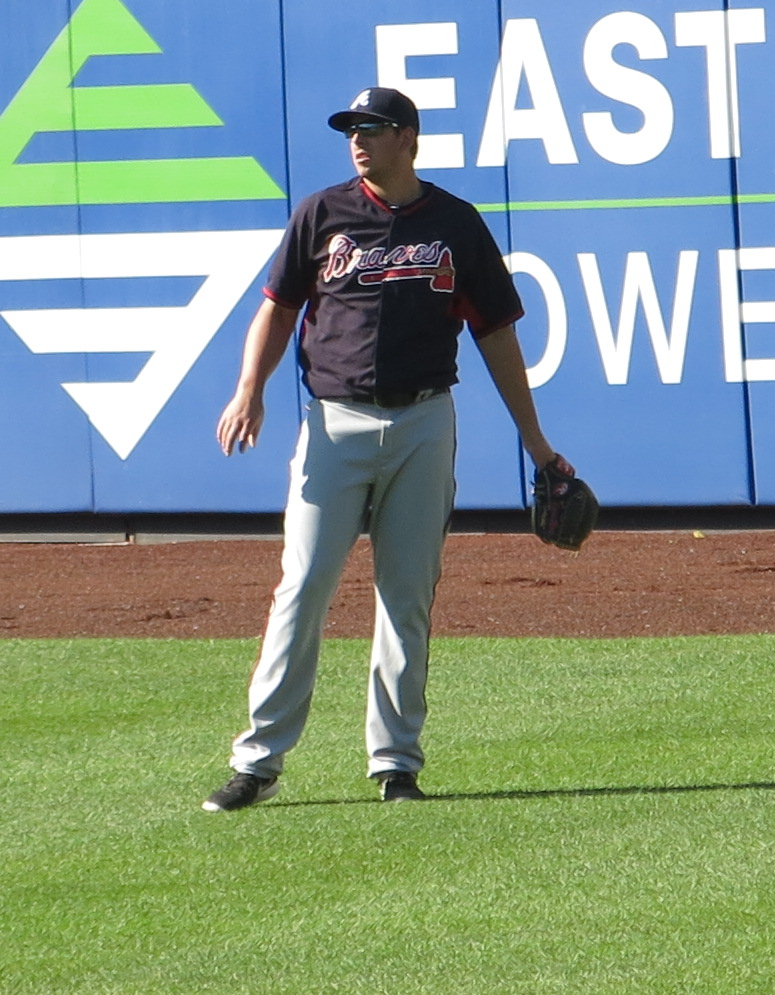
- Blair with the Braves in 2016

Marshall Thundering Herd
- Pitcher / Coach
- Born: May 26, 1992 (age 34); Las Vegas, Nevada, U.S.
- Batted: Right Threw: Right

MLB debut
- April 24, 2016, for the Atlanta Braves

Last MLB appearance
- July 26, 2017, for the Atlanta Braves

MLB statistics
- Win–loss record: 2–8
- Earned run average: 7.89
- Strikeouts: 49
- Stats at Baseball Reference

Teams
- Atlanta Braves (2016–2017)
Medals
Men's baseball
Representing United States
Pan American Games
Silver medal – second place	2015 Toronto	Team

Aaron Daniel Blair (born May 26, 1992) is an American former professional baseball pitcher. Blair was selected in the 21st round of the 2010 MLB draft by the Houston Astros. He chose to attend Marshall University, where he played for the Marshall Thundering Herd baseball team. The Arizona Diamondbacks selected Blair with the 36th pick of the 2013 MLB draft. He was traded to the Atlanta Braves by the Diamondbacks as part of a five-player deal announced December 9, 2015. Blair made his Major League Baseball (MLB) debut in 2016 for the Braves.

== Amateur career ==
A native of Las Vegas, Nevada, Blair threw a no-hitter in his sophomore year at Spring Valley High School. He was 7–0 his junior year and became a Nevada 1st Team All-State player his senior year while leading all Nevada 4A pitchers with 91 strikeouts in 64 innings. He had 9 complete games out of 10 starts. He added a .449 average with 7 home runs and 43 RBIs his senior year.

Though not highly recruited coming out of high school, Blair caught the eye of Marshall University while playing for the Ohio Warhawks in the WWBA World Championship in Jupiter, Florida, during the fall of his senior year. Blair agreed to attend Marshall on a scholarship, where he played college baseball for the Marshall Thundering Herd. As a freshman, Blair led the team in ERA with a 2.72 while being named to the Conference USA All-Freshmen team. His sophomore year Blair led the Thundering Herd pitching staff in starts (14). innings pitched (83 2/3) and strikeouts (82). During the summer between his sophomore and junior year, Blair played in the Cape Cod Baseball League for the Yarmouth-Dennis Red Sox. He was named Pitcher of the Week for the first and second weeks of the season as he went on to lead the Cape Cod Baseball League in ERA with a 1.17 while going 6–0 and then adding two wins in the Cape Cod Baseball League playoffs. In an elimination game in the championship series, Blair went seven innings while allowing two hits and striking out ten to force a final game.

As a junior, Blair was added to the Golden Spikes Award watch list. Blair was named a 1st Team Conference USA pitcher. Included in his season was an 8 inning, 2 hit, 11 strikeout and no run game against the 19th ranked Houston Cougars in a 4–0 win to earn Blair Louisville Slugger National Pitcher of the Week. He finished his Marshall career with 200 strikeouts in 202 innings. Blair then became the highest drafted player in Marshall University baseball history when the Arizona Diamondbacks selected him in the 1st round with the 36th pick.

== Professional career ==
=== Arizona Diamondbacks ===
The Arizona Diamondbacks selected Blair with the 36th pick in the 2013 MLB draft. Blair signed with the Diamondbacks for a $1.435 million signing bonus and was assigned to the Hillsboro Hops of the Class A-Short Season Northwest League. He was promoted in August to the South Bend Silver Hawks of the Midwest League, where he won two playoff games.

Blair started the 2014 campaign in South Bend but was promoted to High A Advanced Visalia Rawhide after six starts in South Bend. In his debut for Visala, Blair went seven innings, allowing one run on three hits, walking two and striking out nine. Blair made 12 more starts for Visalia before being promoted, this time to the Southern League with the AA Mobile BayBears. Blair dominated in his first two Southern League starts, pitching a combined 13 2/3 innings, allowing 1 run and 8 hits while striking out 16 and walking 1. Those performances also earned him the Southern League's Pitcher of the Week award. Blair finished the 2014 season with Mobile with a 4–1 record in 8 starts, covering 46 1/3 innings with a 1.94 ERA to go along with 46 strikeouts. The season totals were a 9–5 record over 27 starts and 154 1/3 innings. He struck out 171 hitters while walking 51. He was also named the Arizona Diamondbacks 2014 Minor League Pitcher of the Year.

Both MLB.com and Baseball America ranked Blair the Diamondbacks' third best prospect prior to the start of the 2015 season. He started the year back in Mobile and made 13 starts, finishing with a record of 6–3 and an ERA of 2.70 over 83 1/3 innings before he was promoted to the AAA Reno Aces in June, where he continued his successful 2015 campaign. Blair ended his Reno stint with a record of 7–2 and an ERA of 3.16 in the hitting-friendly Pacific Coast League. He was also named the Diamondbacks 2015 Organizational Pitcher of the Year.

=== Atlanta Braves ===
On December 9, 2015, the Diamondbacks traded Blair, along with Dansby Swanson and Ender Inciarte, to the Atlanta Braves for Shelby Miller and Gabe Speier. MLB.com ranked Blair the Braves' fourth-best prospect at the start of the 2016 season. He was invited to spring training that year as a non-roster invitee.

Blair began the season with the Gwinnett Braves of the Class AAA International League, and was promoted to the MLB on April 23, making his MLB debut the following day. He made 11 starts for the team and pitched to a 7.99 ERA before being optioned to Gwinnett on June 25. Blair did not collect a win in his first stint with the Braves, and he became the first Braves pitcher to take five career-opening losses since Don Collins in 1977. While in the minors, Blair injured his knee and only started nine games, pitching to a 2–4 record and a 5.98 ERA. On August 27, Blair was recalled to face the San Francisco Giants the next day. He finished four innings while yielding three home runs and took the loss. Due to this rocky performance as well as his struggles throughout the season at the major league and minor league levels, the Braves chose to remove Blair from the rotation so he could focus on improving his pitching mechanics. He started against the New York Mets on September 19, and earned his first major league victory. In 2016 in AAA, he was 5–4 with a 4.65 ERA, and in the majors he was 2–7 with a 7.59 ERA (with 14 home runs in 70 innings). He once gave up 9 runs in one inning against the Pirates at PNC Park on May 3, 2016. In January Blair was called up for the first time during the 2017 season on April 20. In 2017 in AAA, he was 7–9 with a 5.02 ERA, and in the majors he was 0–1 with a 15.00 ERA. Blair was released on May 31, 2018, six weeks after having surgery to repair a torn muscle in his pitching shoulder.

=== Second stint with Diamondbacks ===
On February 12, 2020, Blair signed a minor league contract with the Arizona Diamondbacks organization. Blair did not play in a game for the Diamondbacks organization in 2020 due to the cancellation of the minor league season because of the COVID-19 pandemic. The team released Blair on May 22, 2020.

=== Eastern Reyes del Tigre ===
In July 2020, Blair signed on to play for the Eastern Reyes del Tigre of the Constellation Energy League (a makeshift 4-team independent league created as a result of the COVID-19 pandemic) for the 2020 season. In 4 games, Blair logged a 6.75 ERA.

=== West Virginia Power ===
On May 14, 2021, Blair signed with the West Virginia Power of the Atlantic League of Professional Baseball. Blair made one appearance for the Power, allowing an earned run in 5.0 innings pitched.

=== San Francisco Giants ===
On July 20, 2021, Blair's contract was purchased by the San Francisco Giants organization.

=== Wild Health Genomes ===
On April 12, 2022, Blair signed with the Wild Health Genomes of the Atlantic League of Professional Baseball. Blair struggled to an 0–4 record and 13.25 ERA across 7 starts for the Genomes, striking out 11 in 17.2 innings before he was released on June 23.

== Coaching career ==
On July 18, 2025, it was announced Blair was hired to serve as the pitching coach at Marshall University under head coach, Greg Beals.

== Personal life ==
Blair's parents are Janice and Craig Blair. He has an older brother, Garrett.

In March 2015, Blair became engaged to Caitlyn Morrone, whom he met in college. They married in January 2017 in Las Vegas.
