= Chris Withrow =

American baseball player (born 1989)

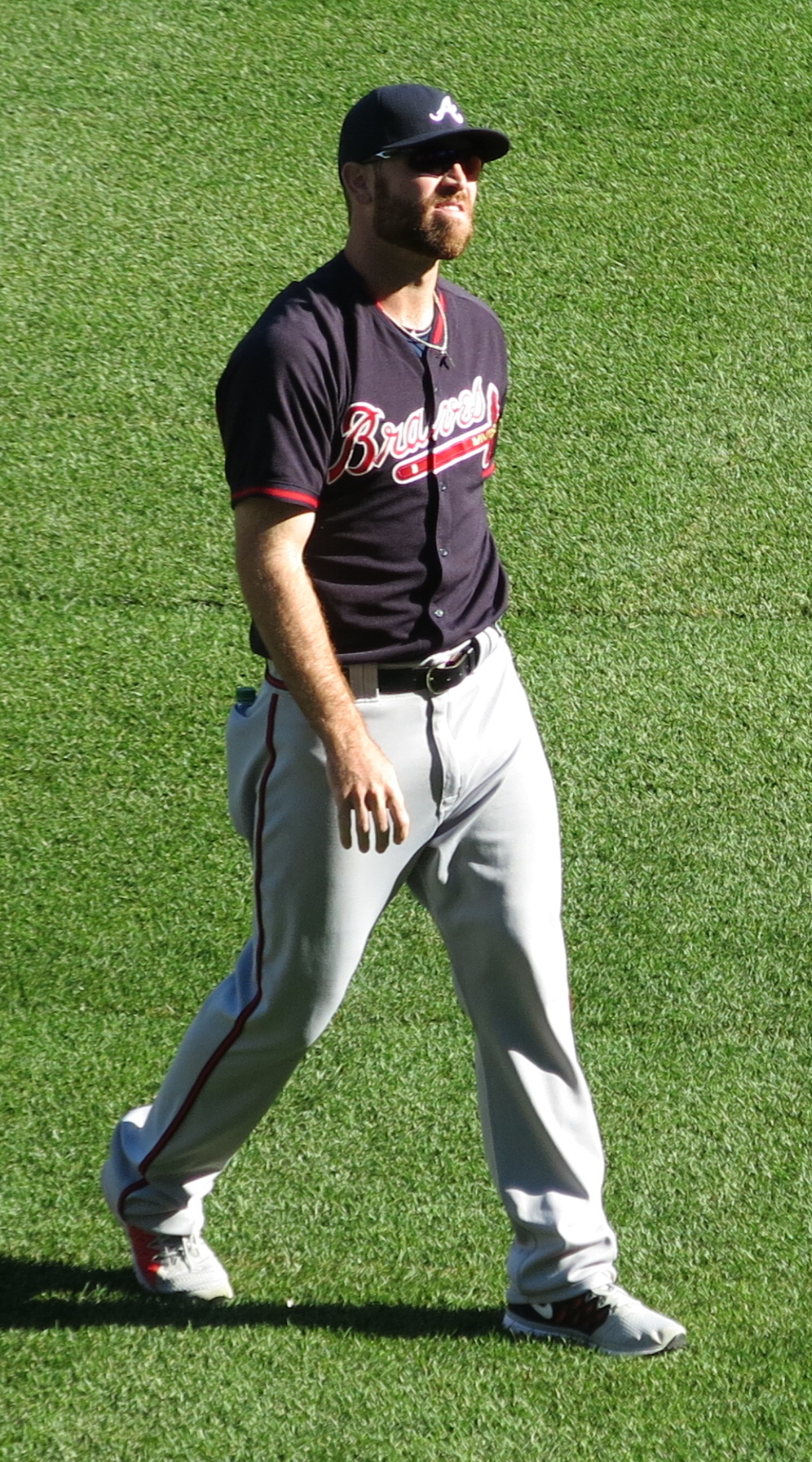
- Withrow with the Atlanta Braves
- Pitcher
- Born: April 1, 1989 (age 37); Austin, Texas, U.S.
- Batted: Right Threw: Right

MLB debut
- June 12, 2013, for the Los Angeles Dodgers

Last MLB appearance
- September 17, 2016, for the Atlanta Braves

MLB statistics
- Win–loss record: 6–0
- Earned run average: 3.07
- Strikeouts: 99
- Stats at Baseball Reference

Teams
- Los Angeles Dodgers (2013–2014); Atlanta Braves (2016)

Christopher Michael Withrow (born April 1, 1989) is an American former professional baseball pitcher. He played in Major League Baseball (MLB) for the Los Angeles Dodgers and Atlanta Braves.

== Career ==
=== Amateur career ===
Withrow attended Midland Christian School in Midland, Texas. As a senior at Midland, Withrow had a 8–1 win–loss record with a 1.32 earned run average (ERA) and 90 strikeouts for the school's baseball team.

=== Los Angeles Dodgers ===
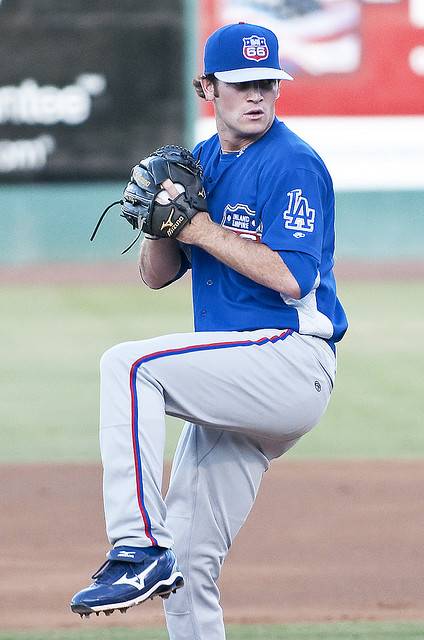
Withrow with the Inland Empire 66ers

The Los Angeles Dodgers selected Withrow in the first round of the 2007 MLB draft. He missed most of the 2008 season with an assortment of injuries and then spent the majority of 2009 with the Inland Empire 66ers, where he was 6–6 with a 4.69 ERA in 19 appearances. He was rated as the Dodgers #2 prospect by the MLB Network before the 2010 season and was assigned by the Dodgers to the Double-A Chattanooga Lookouts. He started 27 games for the Lookouts, with a record of 4–9 and a 5.97 ERA.

In 2011 with the Lookouts, he started 25 games and finished 6–6 with a 4.20 ERA. He was added to the 40-man roster after the season to protect him from the Rule 5 Draft. In 2012, after 7 starts, the Dodgers decided to turn him into a relief pitcher. He finished the season with a 3–3 record and 4.65 ERA in 22 games. The Dodgers promoted him to the Triple-A Albuquerque Isotopes to start 2013.

The Dodgers promoted Withrow to the major leagues for the first time on June 11, 2013. He made his debut the following night in relief against the Arizona Diamondbacks. In 2/3 of an inning, he allowed 3 hits, walked one and struck out one. In 26 games for the Dodgers he was 3–0 with a 2.60 ERA and also picked up his first save on September 3 against the Colorado Rockies.

Withrow began 2014 in the Dodgers bullpen and pitched 21 1/3 innings in 20 games. He had a 2.95 ERA and 28 strikeouts but he also walked 18. However, on May 30, he was diagnosed with a torn ligament in his right elbow, requiring Tommy John surgery, which shut him down for the rest of the season. He remained on the 60-day disabled list at the start of the 2015 season.

=== Atlanta Braves ===
On May 27, 2015, he was traded to the Atlanta Braves (with Juan Uribe) in exchange for Alberto Callaspo, Eric Stults, Ian Thomas and Juan Jaime. Though Withrow was eligible for arbitration, he and the Braves agreed to a one-year contract for the 2016 season worth $610,000 on January 14. Withrow was invited to spring training, but did not make the team, instead starting the 2016 season with the Triple A Gwinnett Braves. Withrow received his first callup of the season on April 10, and returned to the minors on May 1. On May 26, the Braves recalled Withrow. He pitched at the major league level until August 6, when he was placed on the disabled list with right elbow inflammation. Withrow returned and made six appearances during the first half of September. In 46 total appearances for Atlanta, he compiled a 3-0 record and 3.58 ERA with 28 strikeouts across 37 2/3 innings pitched. On December 2, the Braves non-tendered Withrow, making him a free agent.

=== Kansas City Royals ===
On January 7, 2017, Withrow signed a minor league contract with the Kansas City Royals that included an invitation to spring training. He spent the entire season on the disabled list and elected free agency on November 6.

== Personal life ==
Withrow's father, Mike, played college baseball for the University of Texas at Austin and was drafted by the Chicago White Sox. Withrow has two brothers, Matt and Steve, who are also baseball players. Matt was selected in the sixth round of the 2015 MLB draft by the Braves.
