= Tyrell Jenkins =

American baseball player (born 1992)

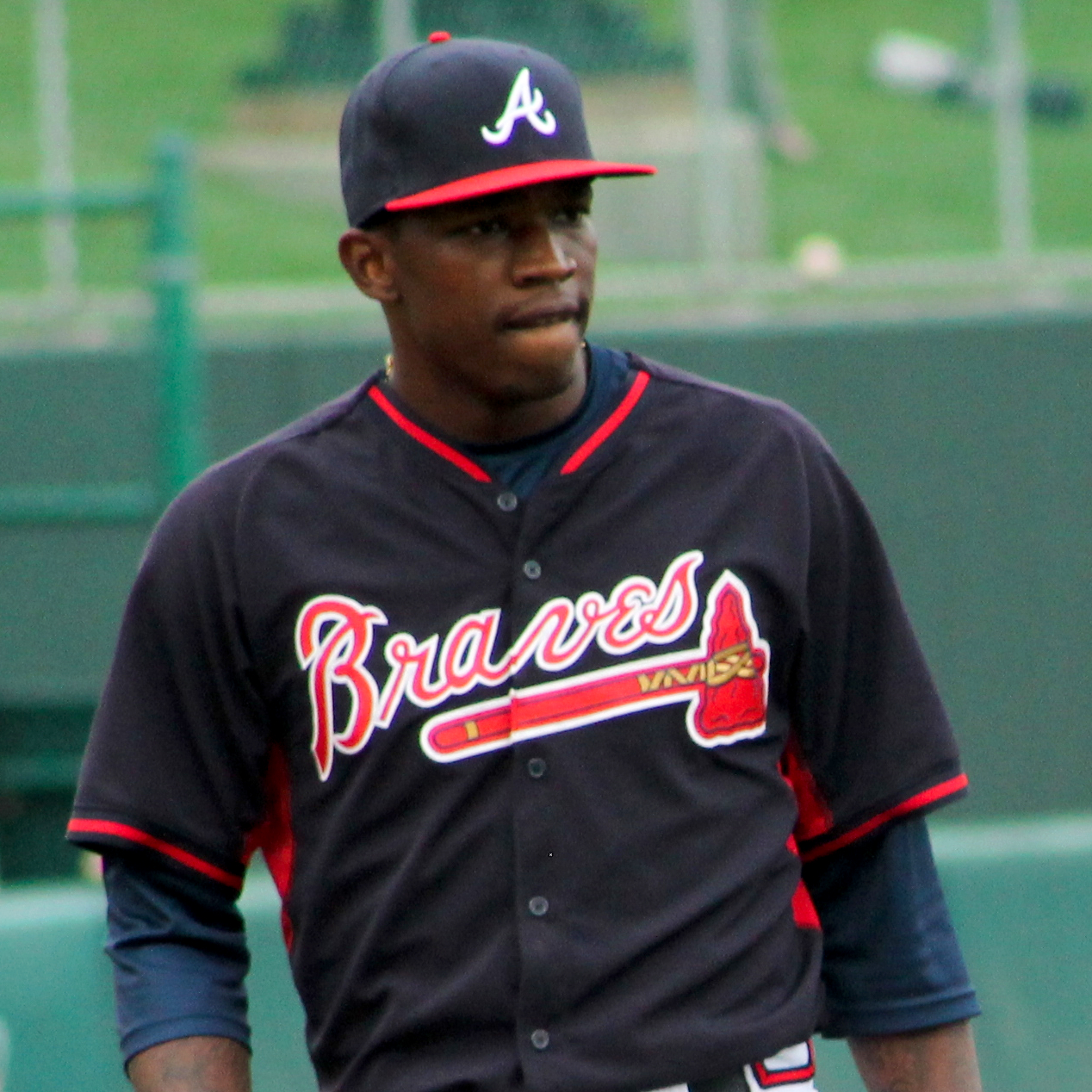
- Jenkins with the Atlanta Braves
- Pitcher
- Born: July 20, 1992 (age 34); Henderson, Texas, U.S.
- Batted: Right Threw: Right

MLB debut
- June 22, 2016, for the Atlanta Braves

Last MLB appearance
- September 30, 2016, for the Atlanta Braves

MLB statistics
- Win–loss record: 2–4
- Earned run average: 5.88
- Strikeouts: 26
- Stats at Baseball Reference

Teams
- Atlanta Braves (2016)

Tyrell Deon Jenkins (born July 20, 1992) is an American former professional baseball pitcher. He played in Major League Baseball (MLB) for the Atlanta Braves.

== Career ==
Jenkins was born on July 20, 1992, in Henderson, Texas, where he was raised by his mother, Sharon, his aunt, and his grandmother. Jenkins attended Henderson High School in his hometown, where he played basketball and was a highly ranked recruit in both baseball and American football. In January 2010, he committed to play both college baseball and college football at Baylor University.

=== St. Louis Cardinals ===
Jenkins was drafted by the St. Louis Cardinals in the first round of the 2010 Major League Baseball draft. He signed with the Cardinals for $1.3 million and forwent attending Baylor.

Jenkins made his professional debut in 2010 for the Johnson City Cardinals. He appeared in two games, allowing no runs over three innings pitched with two strikeouts. He returned to Johnson City in 2011 and had a 3.86 earned run average (ERA) with 55 strikeouts in 11 starts. Jenkins was personally invited to spring training by Cardinals manager Mike Matheny in 2012. He pitched that season for the Quad Cities River Bandits. He started 19 games with a 5.14 ERA and 80 strikeouts, before an injury to his latissimus dorsi muscle ended his season. Jenkins started 2013 with the Peoria Chiefs and was promoted to the Palm Beach Cardinals during the season. His season came to an end in August after having surgery on his shoulder. He finished the year with a 4.70 ERA in 13 starts. Jenkins returned to Palm Beach to start the 2014 season. He didn't pitch his first game until June due to the injury from the previous year. In 13 starts he had a 3.28 ERA and 41 strikeouts in 74 innings. After the regular season, the Cardinals assigned Jenkins to the Arizona Fall League.

=== Atlanta Braves ===
On November 17, 2014, the Cardinals traded Jenkins and Shelby Miller to the Atlanta Braves in exchange for Jason Heyward and Jordan Walden. Jenkins began the 2015 season with the Mississippi Braves. He played in 16 games and went 5–5 with a 3.00 ERA. He was promoted to the Gwinnett Braves of the Triple-A International League on July 9 and made his Triple-A debut against the Norfolk Tides. Jenkins remained with Gwinnett for the rest of the year, finishing with a total of 25 starts, and a 3.19 ERA. He was named the Braves' Minor League Pitcher of the Year at the end of the season. Jenkins opened the 2016 season in Gwinnett's starting rotation, where he pitched 57 2/3 innings and recorded a 2.97 ERA. In June, he began pitching in relief, a move that was seen to increase the possibility of a promotion to the major leagues. On June 16, 2016, Jenkins was called up to the major leagues for the first time. He made his debut six days later against the Miami Marlins, throwing one scoreless inning in relief to finish the eighth inning. On July 6, Jenkins made his first major league start in place of Julio Teherán. He faced the Philadelphia Phillies, pitching 4 2/3 innings, while yielding one earned run. On July 29, 2016, Jenkins recorded his first Major League win against the Philadelphia Phillies giving up one unearned run, four hits, and four walks as well as recording four strikeouts through six innings. On August 20, he was sent down to Gwinnett. Jenkins was recalled on September 17.

=== San Diego Padres ===
On December 8, 2016, the Braves traded Jenkins and Brady Feigl to the Texas Rangers in exchange for Luke Jackson. Jenkins was designated for assignment by the Rangers on December 21. Jenkins was claimed off waivers by the Cincinnati Reds on December 23.

On January 3, 2017, Jenkins was claimed off waivers again, this time by the San Diego Padres. He began the season with the El Paso Chihuahuas of the Triple–A Pacific Coast League, but struggled to a 4-8 record and 7.76 ERA with 56 strikeouts across 82 1/3 innings pitched. Jenkins was released by the Padres organization on July 21.

== After MLB ==
In 2019, Jenkins was playing for The Kekambas, a softball team in Texas. On July 31, he was involved in a brawl on the field which resulted in his suspension from the team for the remainder of the season.

In June of 2026, Jenkins was named the head baseball coach of the Grapeland Sandies in Grapeland, TX.
