= Joel De La Cruz =

Dominican baseball pitcher (born 1989)

- Pitcher
- Born: June 9, 1989 (age 37); Bajos de Haina, Dominican Republic
- Batted: Switch Threw: Right

MLB debut
- June 29, 2016, for the Atlanta Braves

Last MLB appearance
- September 30, 2016, for the Atlanta Braves

MLB statistics
- Win–loss record: 0–7
- Earned run average: 4.88
- Strikeouts: 37
- Stats at Baseball Reference

Teams
- Atlanta Braves (2016)

Joel De La Cruz Santos (born June 9, 1989) is a Dominican former professional baseball pitcher. He played in Major League Baseball (MLB) for the Atlanta Braves.

== Career ==
=== Milwaukee Brewers ===
De La Cruz signed with the Milwaukee Brewers in 2006 and was assigned to the team's Arizona League affiliate he played in the Brewers organization until 2009.

=== Washington Nationals ===
De La Cruz was signed and later released by the Washington Nationals in 2009. In 13 appearances for the Dominican Summer League Nationals, he had logged an 0–4 record and 7.27 ERA with 14 strikeouts over 26 innings of work.

=== New York Yankees ===
The New York Yankees signed De La Cruz in 2010. He spent his first season with the Yankees in the Dominican Summer League and was promoted to the Tampa Yankees of the Florida State League during the 2011 season. De La Cruz split the 2012 season between the Charleston RiverDogs and Tampa. He was assigned to Tampa for the entirety of the 2013 season. The Yankees promoted De La Cruz to the Trenton Thunder of the Double-A Eastern League at the start of 2014, and later promoted him to the Triple-A Scranton/Wilkes-Barre RailRiders. De La Cruz re-signed with the Yankees in September 2014, and started the 2015 season with the Trenton Thunder. The Yankees promoted him to the major leagues on April 13, 2015, to replace Kyle Davies. The Yankees outrighted him off of the 40-man roster on April 18. He then split the season between Trenton and Scranton/Wilkes-Barre.

=== Atlanta Braves ===
De La Cruz became a minor league free agent after the 2015 season, and signed with the Atlanta Braves. The Braves promoted De La Cruz to the major leagues on April 11 and May 20, 2016, each time for one day only. He was outrighted off the Braves 40-man roster later that week, having made no major league appearances, briefly becoming a phantom ballplayer. The Braves recalled De La Cruz for the third time during the season on June 29, and he made his major league debut that night. De La Cruz spent the season shifting between the bullpen and starting rotation. He made 22 appearances (nine starts) for Atlanta during his rookie campaign, posting an 0–7 record and 4.88 ERA with 37 strikeouts across 62 2/3 innings pitched. On October 14, De La Cruz was removed from the 40-man roster and sent outright to the Triple-A Gwinnett Braves.

De La Cruz made six appearances for Gwinnett during the 2017 season, posting a 7.27 ERA with three strikeouts across 8 2/3 innings pitched. He was released by the Braves organization on October 23, 2017.
