= Jed Bradley =

American baseball pitcher (born 1990)

- Pitcher
- Born: June 12, 1990 (age 36); Huntsville, Alabama, U.S.
- Batted: Left Threw: Left

MLB debut
- September 3, 2016, for the Atlanta Braves

Last MLB appearance
- September 24, 2016, for the Atlanta Braves

MLB statistics
- Win–loss record: 1–1
- Earned run average: 5.14
- Strikeouts: 4
- Stats at Baseball Reference

Teams
- Atlanta Braves (2016)

Jedidiah Custer Bradley (born June 12, 1990) is an American former Major League Baseball pitcher who played for the Atlanta Braves in 2016.

== Career ==
=== Amateur ===
Bradley graduated from Huntsville High School in Huntsville, Alabama. He had an appendectomy that year, and played in only six games for his school's baseball team. He attended the Georgia Institute of Technology, where he played for the Georgia Tech Yellow Jackets baseball team. In 2010, he played collegiate summer baseball with the Wareham Gatemen of the Cape Cod Baseball League, where he was a league all-star. As a junior, in 2011, he had a 7-3 win–loss record and a 3.49 earned run average (ERA). He was named to the All-Atlantic Coast Conference's second-team. Bradley would later return to Georgia Tech to complete his degree, graduating with high honors in August 2018.

=== Milwaukee Brewers ===
The Milwaukee Brewers selected Bradley in the first round, with the 15th overall selection, of the 2011 Major League Baseball draft. Bradley made his professional debut with the Brevard County Manatees of the High-A Florida State League in 2012, but struggled, pitching to a 5.53 ERA. He remained with Brevard County in 2013, when his season ended prematurely due to a shoulder injury, and began the 2014 season there as well. For Brevard County in 2014, Bradley had a 5–2 record in 10 starts with a 2.98 ERA and 53 strikeouts in 60 1/3 innings pitched, before he was promoted to the Huntsville Stars of the Double-A Southern League in late May 2014. In 2015, the Brewers transitioned Bradley into a relief pitcher. He split the 2015 season between the Biloxi Shuckers of the Southern League and the Colorado Springs Sky Sox of the Triple-A Pacific Coast League. Bradley began the 2016 season with Biloxi.

=== Atlanta Braves ===
On June 3, 2016, the Brewers traded Bradley to the Atlanta Braves for a player to be named later or cash considerations. He resumed working as a starting pitcher, playing for the Mississippi Braves of the Southern League and the Gwinnett Braves of the Triple-A International League. The Braves promoted Bradley to the major leagues on September 1. He made his major league debut on September 3, earning the win.

=== Baltimore Orioles ===
On October 7, 2016, the Baltimore Orioles claimed Bradley off of waivers from the Braves. On November 9, Bradley was removed from the 40-man roster and sent outright to the Triple-A Norfolk Tides.

The Orioles invited Bradley to spring training in 2017. He pitched for the Bowie Baysox of the Double-A Eastern League, and announced his retirement on May 4, 2017. In eight appearances split between Bowie and the Triple-A Norfolk Tides. he had posted a 1-2 record and 9.75 ERA with nine strikeouts over 12 innings of work.

=== New Britain Bees ===
On March 19, 2019, Bradley came out of retirement to sign with the New Britain Bees of the Atlantic League of Professional Baseball. He made 23 appetences (13 starts) for the Bees, compiling a 3-8 record and 7.75 ERA with 65 strikeouts over 72 innings of work. Bradley became a free agent following the season.
