= Madison Younginer =

American baseball player (born 1990)

- Pitcher
- Born: November 3, 1990 (age 35); Augusta, Georgia
- Batted: Right Threw: Right

MLB debut
- August 7, 2016, for the Atlanta Braves

Last MLB appearance
- August 24, 2016, for the Atlanta Braves

MLB statistics
- Win–loss record: 0-0
- Earned run average: 6.43
- Strikeouts: 4
- Stats at Baseball Reference

Teams
- Atlanta Braves (2016)

John Madison Younginer IV (born November 3, 1990) is an American former professional baseball pitcher. He played in Major League Baseball (MLB) for the Atlanta Braves in 2016.

== Career ==
Younginer attended Mauldin High School in Mauldin, South Carolina.

=== Boston Red Sox ===
The Boston Red Sox selected Younginer in the seventh round of the 2009 Major League Baseball draft. Younginer signed with the Red Sox, receiving a $1 million signing bonus, rather than attend Clemson University. He pitched in the Red Sox farm system from 2010 through 2015, reaching as high as Triple-A with the Pawtucket Red Sox.

=== Atlanta Braves ===
On November 10, 2015, Younginer signed a minor league contract with the Atlanta Braves organization. On August 7, 2016, Younginer was selected to the 40-man roster and promoted to the major leagues for the first time. In 8 appearances for Atlanta, he struggled to a 6.43 ERA with 4 strikeouts across 7 innings pitched. On September 3, Younginer was removed from the 40–man roster and sent outright to the Triple–A Gwinnett Braves. He became a free agent following the season on November 7.

=== Los Angeles Dodgers ===
On November 17, 2016, Younginer signed a minor league contract with the Los Angeles Dodgers and he was assigned to the Triple-A Oklahoma City Dodgers to begin the season, where he was selected to the mid-season Pacific Coast League all-star team. In 40 games (3 starts) for Oklahoma City, he posted a 4–5 record and 4.76 ERA with 70 strikeouts and 8 saves in 62 1/3 innings pitched. He elected free agency following the season on November 6, 2017.

=== San Francisco Giants ===
On January 25, 2018, Younginer signed a minor league contract with the San Francisco Giants organization. He was released on June 5.

=== Los Angeles Dodgers (second stint) ===
On June 16, 2018, Younginer signed a minor league deal with the Los Angeles Dodgers. He appeared in seven games in the Dodgers farm system, across three levels, before he was released on July 26.

Younginer completed a month-long assignment with the Canberra Cavalry of the Australian Baseball League in January 2019, and retired from professional baseball after that.

=== Sioux Falls Canaries ===
On July 28, 2020, Younginer came out of retirement to sign with the Sioux Falls Canaries of the American Association of Independent Professional Baseball. He was released on September 9.

== Personal life ==
Younginer's cousin is Brandon Snyder.
