= 2016 San Francisco Giants season =

2016 San Francisco Giants
- National League Wild Card winners
- League: National League
- Division: West
- Ballpark: AT&T Park
- City: San Francisco, California
- Record: 87–75 (.537)
- Divisional place: 2nd
- Owners: Larry Baer (managing general partner)
- Managers: Bruce Bochy
- Television: KNTV (NBC Bay Area 11) (Jon Miller, Mike Krukow, Duane Kuiper); CSN Bay Area (Duane Kuiper, Mike Krukow, Dave Flemming, Jon Miller)
- Radio: KNBR (680 AM) (Jon Miller, Dave Flemming, Duane Kuiper, Mike Krukow); KTRB (860 AM, Spanish); KKSF (910 AM, Spanish) (Erwin Higueros, Tito Fuentes, Marvin Benard)
- Stats: ESPN.com; Baseball Reference

The 2016 San Francisco Giants season was the Giants' 134th year in Major League Baseball, their 59th year in San Francisco since their move from New York following the 1957 season, and their 17th at AT&T Park. They reached the postseason, where they defeated the New York Mets in the NLWC Game but lost in four games to the eventual World Series champion Chicago Cubs in the NLDS.

== Events ==
- November 5, 2015 − The Giants decline to exercise options on OF Nori Aoki and OF Marlon Byrd, allowing them to become free agents.
- November 17, 2015 – The Giants and IF Brandon Crawford agreed to a 6-year contract extension worth $75 million with a full no-trade clause and no option years.
- December 3, 2015 – The Giants decline to tender the 2016 contracts on RHP Yusmeiro Petit and C Héctor Sánchez, allowing them to become free agents.
- December 9, 2015 – The Giants sign RHP Jeff Samardzija to a five-year, $90 million contract.
- December 16, 2015 – The Giants sign RHP Johnny Cueto to a six-year, $130 million contract with a club option for 2022. Cueto can opt out of the contract after two years.
- January 7, 2016 – The Giants sign CF Denard Span to a three-year, $31 million contract.
- January 13, 2016 – The Giants received a player to be named or cash considerations from the Arizona Diamondbacks in exchange for minor-league RHP Cody Hall.
- February 1, 2016 – The Giants and RHP George Kontos agreed to a one-year, $1.15 million contract avoiding salary arbitration.
- February 10, 2016 – The Giants and 1B Brandon Belt agreed to a one-year, $6.2 million contract avoiding salary arbitration.
- April 9, 2016 – The Giants and 1B Brandon Belt agreed to a 5-year contract extension.
- July 5, 2016 – The rosters for the 2016 Major League Baseball All-Star Game are announced, with C Buster Posey being named the National League's starter at catcher and to the all-star game for the fourth time. LHP Madison Bumgarner is named to his fourth all-star roster and RHP Johnny Cueto makes the all-star game for the second time.
- July 5, 2016 – Brandon Belt won the Final Vote for the All-Star Game and makes his first appearance in the All-Star Game.
- July 28, 2016 – The Giants acquire IF Eduardo Núñez from the Minnesota Twins in exchange for minor league LHP Adalberto Mejia.
- August 1, 2016 – The Giants acquire LHP Will Smith from the Milwaukee Brewers in exchange for minor league LHP Phil Bickford and C Andrew Susac.
- August 1, 2016 – The Giants acquire LHP Matt Moore from the Tampa Bay Rays in exchange for 3B Matt Duffy, minor league RHP Michael Santos, and minor league IF Lucius Fox.
- September 27, 2016 – The Giants acquire 3B Gordon Beckham from the Atlanta Braves in exchange for minor league SS Rich Rodriguez.
- November 11, 2016 – SS Brandon Crawford and C Buster Posey were named Wilson Defensive Players of the Year along with the team that named Defensive Team of the Year.

== Season standings ==
=== National League West ===
NL West
Team	W	L	Pct.	GB	Home	Road
Los Angeles Dodgers	91	71	.562	—	53‍–‍28	38‍–‍43
San Francisco Giants	87	75	.537	4	45‍–‍36	42‍–‍39
Colorado Rockies	75	87	.463	16	42‍–‍39	33‍–‍48
Arizona Diamondbacks	69	93	.426	22	33‍–‍48	36‍–‍45
San Diego Padres	68	94	.420	23	39‍–‍42	29‍–‍52

=== National League Division Standings ===
Division leaders
Team	W	L	Pct.
Chicago Cubs	103	58	.640
Washington Nationals	95	67	.586
Los Angeles Dodgers	91	71	.562

Wild Card teams (Top 2 teams qualify for postseason)
Team	W	L	Pct.	GB
New York Mets	87	75	.537	—
San Francisco Giants	87	75	.537	—
St. Louis Cardinals	86	76	.531	1
Miami Marlins	79	82	.491	7½
Pittsburgh Pirates	78	83	.484	8½
Colorado Rockies	75	87	.463	12
Milwaukee Brewers	73	89	.451	14
Philadelphia Phillies	71	91	.438	16
Arizona Diamondbacks	69	93	.426	18
Atlanta Braves	68	93	.422	18½
San Diego Padres	68	94	.420	19
Cincinnati Reds	68	94	.420	19

=== Record vs. opponents ===
2016 National League record Source: MLB Standings Grid – 2016
Team	AZ	ATL	CHC	CIN	COL	LAD	MIA	MIL	NYM	PHI	PIT	SD	SF	STL	WSH	AL
Arizona	—	5–2	2–5	3–3	10–9	7–12	2–4	3–4	5–1	4–3	1–5	10–9	6–13	4–3	2–5	5–15
Atlanta	2–5	—	3–3	3–4	1–6	1–5	11–7	2–5	10–9	11–8	3–4	4–2	3–4	2–4	4–15	8–12
Chicago	5–2	3–3	—	15–4	2–4	4–3	4–3	11–8	2–5	5–1	14–4	4–2	4–3	10–9	5–2	15–5
Cincinnati	3–3	4–3	4–15	—	5–2	2–5	3–4	11–8	0–6	4–2	9–10	3–4	3–3	9–10	3–4	5–15
Colorado	9–10	6–1	4–2	2–5	—	7–12	2–5	1–5	6–1	2–5	2–5	10–9	9–10	2–4	4–2	9–11
Los Angeles	12–7	5–1	3–4	5–2	12–7	—	1–6	5–2	4–3	4–2	2–5	11–8	8–11	4–2	5–1	10–10
Miami	4–2	7–11	3–4	4–3	5–2	6–1	—	4–2	7–12	9–10	6–1	3–3	2–4	4–3	9–10	6–14
Milwaukee	4–3	5–2	8–11	8–11	5–1	2–5	2–4	—	2–5	3–4	9–10	3–4	1–5	6–13	4–2	11–9
New York	1–5	9–10	5–2	6–0	1–6	3–4	12–7	5–2	—	12–7	3–3	4–3	4–3	3–3	7–12	12–8
Philadelphia	3–4	8–11	1–5	2–4	5–2	2–4	10–9	4–3	7–12	—	3–4	5–2	3–3	2–5	5–14	11–9
Pittsburgh	5–1	4–3	4–14	10–9	5–2	5–2	1–6	10–9	3–3	4–3	—	3–3	4–3	9–10	2–4	9–11
San Diego	9–10	2–4	2–4	4–3	9–10	8–11	3–3	4–3	3–4	2–5	3–3	—	8–11	1–6	4–3	6–14
San Francisco	13–6	4–3	3–4	3–3	10–9	11–8	4–2	5–1	3–4	3–3	3–4	11–8	—	3–4	3–4	8–12
St. Louis	3–4	4–2	9–10	10–9	4–2	2–4	3–4	13–6	3–3	5–2	10–9	6–1	4–3	—	2–5	8–12
Washington	5–2	15–4	2–5	4–3	2–4	1–5	10–9	2–4	12–7	14–5	4–2	3–4	4–3	5–2	—	12–8

== Game log and schedule ==
All schedule and scores taken from MLB.com.

Legend
	Giants win
	Giants loss
	Postponement
**Bold**	Giants team member

2016 Game Log
April (12–13)

#	Date	Opponent	Score	Win	Loss	Save	Attendance	Record
1	April 4	@ Brewers	12–3	**Bumgarner** (1–0)	Peralta (0–1)	—	44,318	1–0
2	April 5	@ Brewers	2–1	**Cueto** (1–0)	Nelson (0–1)	**Casilla** (1)	24,123	2–0
3	April 6	@ Brewers	3–4	Thornburg (1–0)	**López** (0–1)	Jeffress (1)	20,098	2–1
4	April 7	Dodgers	12–6	**Heston** (1–0)	Wood (0–1)	—	41,940	3–1
5	April 8	Dodgers	3–2 (10)	**Casilla** (1–0)	Blanton (0–1)	—	41,742	4–1
6	April 9	Dodgers	2–3 (10)	Hatcher (1–0)	**Kontos** (0–1)	Jansen (2)	41,224	4–2
7	April 10	Dodgers	9–6	**Cueto** (2–0)	Coleman (0–1)	**Casilla** (2)	41,656	5–2
8	April 12	@ Rockies	7–2	**Samardzija** (1–0)	Chatwood (1–1)	—	20,814	6–2
9	April 13	@ Rockies	6–10	Rusin (1–0)	**Peavy** (0–1)	—	21,891	6–3
10	April 14	@ Rockies	6–11	De La Rosa (1–0)	**Cain** (0–1)	—	21,226	6–4
11	April 15	@ Dodgers	3–7	Kershaw (2–0)	**Bumgarner** (1–1)	—	53,449	6–5
12	April 16	@ Dodgers	4–3	**Cueto** (3–0)	Kazmir (1–1)	**Casilla** (3)	53,409	7–5
13	April 17	@ Dodgers	1–3	Maeda (2–0)	**Samardzija** (1–1)	Jansen (5)	48,911	7–6
14	April 18	Diamondbacks	7–9 (11)	De La Rosa (1–3)	**Heston** (1–1)	Ziegler (3)	41,432	7–7
15	April 19	Diamondbacks	0–3	Ray (1–0)	**Cain** (0–2)	Clippard (1)	41,218	7–8
16	April 20	Diamondbacks	1–2	Greinke (1–2)	**Bumgarner** (1–2)	Ziegler (4)	41,497	7–9
17	April 21	Diamondbacks	2–6	Wagner (1–0)	**Cueto** (3–1)	—	41,052	7–10
18	April 22	Marlins	8–1	**Samardzija** (2–1)	Cosart (0–1)	—	41,760	8–10
19	April 23	Marlins	7–2	**Peavy** (1–1)	Fernández (1–2)	—	41,886	9–10
20	April 24	Marlins	4–5	Barraclough (1–0)	**Osich** (0–1)	Ramos (3)	41,509	9–11
21	April 25	Padres	5–4	**Bumgarner** (2–2)	Pomeranz (2–2)	**Casilla** (4)	41,266	10–11
22	April 26	Padres	1–0	**Cueto** (4–1)	Shields (0–4)	—	41,413	11–11
23	April 27	Padres	13–9	**Samardzija** (3–1)	Cashner (1–2)	—	41,357	12–11
24	April 29	@ Mets	1–13	Matz (3–1)	**Peavy** (1–2)	—	39,764	12–12
25	April 30	@ Mets	5–6	deGrom (3–0)	**Cain** (0–3)	Familia (8)	44,666	12–13

May (21–8)

#	Date	Opponent	Score	Win	Loss	Save	Attendance	Record
26	May 1	@ Mets	6–1	**Bumgarner** (3–2)	Syndergaard (2–1)	—	39,077	13–13
27	May 2	@ Reds	9–6	**Mazzaro** (1–0)	Ramírez (0–2)	**Casilla** (5)	13,829	14–13
28	May 3	@ Reds	3–1	**Samardzija** (4–1)	Cotham (0–1)	**Casilla** (6)	14,309	15–13
29	May 4	@ Reds	4–7	Straily (1–1)	**Peavy** (1–3)	—	21,333	15–14
30	May 5	Rockies	7–17	Bergman (1–3)	**Cain** (0–4)	—	41,477	15–15
31	May 6	Rockies	6–4	**Bumgarner** (4–2)	Bettis (3–2)	**Casilla** (7)	41,358	16–15
32	May 7	Rockies	2–1 (13)	**Law** (1–0)	Miller (1–1)	—	41,590	17–15
33	May 8	Rockies	0–2	Butler (1–1)	**Samardzija** (4–2)	McGee (8)	41,593	17–16
34	May 9	Blue Jays	1–3	Sanchez (3–1)	**Peavy** (1–4)	Osuna (7)	41,256	17–17
35	May 10	Blue Jays	0–4	Happ (5–0)	**Cain** (0–5)	Osuna (8)	41,464	17–18
36	May 11	Blue Jays	5–4 (13)	**Suárez** (1–0)	Tepera (0–1)	—	41,372	18–18
37	May 12	@ Diamondbacks	4–2	**Cueto** (5–1)	Greinke (3–3)	**López** (1)	19,461	19–18
38	May 13	@ Diamondbacks	3–1	**Samardzija** (5–2)	Miller (1–4)	**Casilla** (8)	21,753	20–18
39	May 14	@ Diamondbacks	5–3	**Strickland** (1–0)	Hudson (1–1)	**Gearrin** (1)	32,448	21–18
40	May 15	@ Diamondbacks	2–1	**Strickland** (2–0)	Ziegler (1–2)	**Casilla** (9)	25,007	22–18
41	May 17	@ Padres	5–1	**Bumgarner** (5–2)	Rea (3–2)	—	24,433	23–18
42	May 18	@ Padres	2–1	**Cueto** (6–1)	Pomeranz (4–4)	—	23,518	24–18
43	May 19	@ Padres	3–1	**Samardzija** (6–2)	Shields (2–6)	**Casilla** (10)	26,417	25–18
44	May 20	Cubs	1–8	Arrieta (8–0)	**Peavy** (1–5)	—	41,750	25–19
45	May 21	Cubs	5–3	**Cain** (1–5)	Lester (4–3)	**Casilla** (11)	41,507	26–19
46	May 22	Cubs	1–0	**Bumgarner** (6–2)	Hendricks (2–4)	**Casilla** (12)	41,359	27–19
47	May 23	Padres	1–0	**Cueto** (7–1)	Hand (1–1)	—	42,099	28–19
48	May 24	Padres	8–2	**Samardzija** (7–2)	Cashner (2–4)	—	41,772	29–19
49	May 25	Padres	4–3 (10)	**Kontos** (1–1)	Hand (1–2)	—	41,363	30–19
50	May 27	@ Rockies	2–5	Chatwood (6–3)	**Suárez** (1–1)	McGee (14)	32,901	30–20
51	May 28	@ Rockies	10–5	**Gearrin** (1–0)	Estévez (1–2)	—	39,253	31–20
52	May 29	@ Rockies	8–3	**Cueto** (8–1)	Rusin (1–3)	—	42,307	32–20
53	May 30	@ Braves	3–5	Foltynewicz (2–2)	**Samardzija** (7–3)	—	23,147	32–21
54	May 31	@ Braves	4–0	**Peavy** (2–5)	Wisler (2–5)	—	15,723	33–21

June (17–10)

#	Date	Opponent	Score	Win	Loss	Save	Attendance	Record
55	June 1	@ Braves	4–5 (11)	Withrow (1–0)	**Law** (1–1)	—	15,107	33–22
56	June 2	@ Braves	6–0	**Bumgarner** (7–2)	Blair (0–4)	—	15,983	34–22
57	June 3	@ Cardinals	5–1	**Cueto** (9–1)	Wainwright (5–4)	—	43,560	35–22
58	June 4	@ Cardinals	4–7	Lyons (2–0)	**Samardzija** (7–4)	Rosenthal (9)	45,453	35–23
59	June 5	@ Cardinals	3–6	Martinez (6–5)	**Peavy** (2–6)	Rosenthal (10)	44,907	35–24
60	June 7	Red Sox	3–5 (10)	Tazawa (1–1)	**Casilla** (1–1)	Kimbrel (14)	41,512	35–25
61	June 8	Red Sox	2–1	**Gearrin** (2–0)	Price (7–3)	**Strickland** (1)	41,635	36–25
62	June 10	Dodgers	2–3	Kershaw (9–1)	**Casilla** (1–2)	Jansen (17)	41,208	36–26
63	June 11	Dodgers	5–4 (10)	**Stratton** (1–0)	Jansen (2–2)	—	41,358	37–26
64	June 12	Dodgers	2–1	**Peavy** (3–6)	Urías (0–2)	**Casilla** (13)	41,583	38–26
65	June 13	Brewers	11–5	**Suárez** (2–1)	Knebel (0–1)	—	41,543	39–26
66	June 14	Brewers	3–2	**Bumgarner** (8–2)	Smith (1–1)	**Casilla** (14)	41,750	40–26
67	June 15	Brewers	10–1	**Cueto** (10–1)	Nelson (5–6)	—	41,811	41–26
68	June 17	@ Rays	5–1	**Samardzija** (8–4)	Archer (4–9)	—	40,135	42–26
69	June 18	@ Rays	6–4	**Strickland** (3–0)	Colomé (1–2)	**Gearrin** (2)	23,948	43–26
70	June 19	@ Rays	5–1	**Law** (2–1)	Cedeño (3–2)	—	17,361	44–26
71	June 20	@ Pirates	0–1	Locke (6–5)	**Bumgarner** (8–3)	Melancon (20)	27,906	44–27
72	June 21	@ Pirates	15–4	**Cueto** (11–1)	Boscán (1–1)	—	27,729	45–27
73	June 22	@ Pirates	7–6	**Law** (3–1)	Hughes (0–1)	**Casilla** (15)	33,747	46–27
74	June 23	@ Pirates	5–3	**Suárez** (3–1)	Niese (6–5)	**Casilla** (16)	29,986	47–27
75	June 24	Phillies	5–4	**Peavy** (4–6)	Araújo (1–1)	**Casilla** (17)	42,238	48–27
76	June 25	Phillies	2–3	Hellickson (5–6)	**Bumgarner** (8–4)	Gómez (20)	41,928	48–28
77	June 26	Phillies	8–7	**Gearrin** (3–0)	González (0–1)	—	41,479	49–28
78	June 27	Athletics	3–8	Mengden (1–3)	**Samardzija** (8–5)	—	41,442	49–29
79	June 28	Athletics	11–13	Neal (1–1)	**López** (0–2)	Madson (15)	41,730	49–30
80	June 29	@ Athletics	1–7	Manaea (3–4)	**Peavy** (4–7)	—	32,810	49–31
81	June 30	@ Athletics	12–6	**Bumgarner** (9–4)	Overton (1–1)	—	36,067	50–31

July (11–13)

#	Date	Opponent	Score	Win	Loss	Save	Attendance	Record
82	July 1	@ Diamondbacks	6–4	**Cueto** (12–1)	Miller (2–8)	**Casilla** (18)	24,859	51–31
83	July 2	@ Diamondbacks	5–6	Barrett (1–0)	**Strickland** (3–1)	Ziegler (17)	30,683	51–32
84	July 3	@ Diamondbacks	5–4 (11)	**Osich** (1–1)	Burgos (0–1)	**Casilla** (19)	26,171	52–32
85	July 4	Rockies	3–1	**Peavy** (5–7)	Anderson (0–3)	**Casilla** (20)	41,874	53–32
86	July 5	Rockies	3–7	Lyles (2–2)	**Gearrin** (3–1)	—	41,753	53–33
87	July 6	Rockies	5–1	**Cueto** (13–1)	de la Rosa (5–6)	—	42,076	54–33
88	July 8	Diamondbacks	6–2	**Samardzija** (9–5)	Corbin (4–7)	—	41,576	55–33
89	July 9	Diamondbacks	4–2	**Kontos** (2–1)	Ray (4–8)	**Casilla** (21)	41,571	56–33
90	July 10	Diamondbacks	4–0	**Bumgarner** (10–4)	Bradley (3–5)	—	42,075	57–33
**87th All-Star Game in San Diego, California**
91	July 15	@ Padres	1–4	Cashner (4–7)	**Bumgarner** (10–5)	Maurer (2)	38,522	57–34
92	July 16	@ Padres	6–7 (10)	Quackenbush (6–3)	**Casilla** (1–3)	—	40,550	57–35
93	July 17	@ Padres	3–5	Jackson (1–1)	**Cueto** (13–2)	Maurer (3)	35,784	57–36
94	July 19	@ Red Sox	0–4	Porcello (12–2)	**Peavy** (5–8)	—	38,082	57–37
95	July 20	@ Red Sox	7–11	Barnes (3–3)	**Cain** (1–6)	—	38,201	57–38
96	July 22	@ Yankees	2–3	Miller (6–1)	**Osich** (1–2)	Chapman (20)	45,304	57–39
97	July 23	@ Yankees	2–1 (12)	**Casilla** (2–3)	Swarzak (1–1)	**Strickland** (2)	46,727	58–39
98	July 24	@ Yankees	2–5	Eovaldi (9–6)	**Samardzija** (9–6)	Green (1)	34,143	58–40
99	July 25	Reds	5–7	DeSclafani (6–0)	**Peavy** (5–9)	Cingrani (11)	42,147	58–41
100	July 26	Reds	9–7	**Cain** (2–6)	Reed (0–5)	**Casilla** (22)	41,896	59–41
101	July 27	Reds	1–2	Straily (6–6)	**Bumgarner** (10–6)	Cingrani (12)	42,079	59–42
102	July 28	Nationals	2–4	Roark (10–6)	**Cueto** (13–3)	Kelley (5)	42,001	59–43
103	July 29	Nationals	1–4	Scherzer (11–6)	**Samardzija** (9–7)	Kelley (6)	41,959	59–44
104	July 30	Nationals	5–3	**Law** (4–1)	Petit (3–2)	**Casilla** (23)	41,743	60–44
105	July 31	Nationals	3–1	**Cain** (3–6)	González (6–9)	**Casilla** (24)	41,795	61–44

August (11–16)

#	Date	Opponent	Score	Win	Loss	Save	Attendance	Record
106	August 2	@ Phillies	8–13	Neris (4–3)	**Smith** (0–1)	—	23,351	61–45
107	August 3	@ Phillies	4–5 (12)	García (1–0)	**Kontos** (2–2)	—	23,162	61–46
108	August 4	@ Phillies	3–2 (10)	**Romo** (1–0)	González (0–2)	**Casilla** (25)	30,229	62–46
109	August 5	@ Nationals	1–5	González (7–9)	**Samardzija** (9–8)	—	34,036	62–47
110	August 6	@ Nationals	7–1	**Cain** (4–6)	Strasburg (15–2)	—	36,404	63–47
111	August 7	@ Nationals	0–1	Roark (12–6)	**Bumgarner** (10–7)	Melancon (31)	32,790	63–48
112	August 8	@ Marlins	8–7 (14)	**Kontos** (3–2)	McGowan (1–3)	—	22,806	64–48
113	August 9	@ Marlins	0–2	Koehler (9–8)	**Moore** (0–1)	Rodney (19)	19,636	64–49
114	August 10	@ Marlins	1–0	**Samardzija** (10–8)	Phelps (5–6)	**Casilla** (26)	21,096	65–49
115	August 12	Orioles	2–5	Bundy (6–3)	**Cain** (4–7)	Britton (36)	41,479	65–50
116	August 13	Orioles	6–2	**Bumgarner** (11–7)	Gausman (3–10)	**Casilla** (27)	41,456	66–50
117	August 14	Orioles	7–8	Brach (7–1)	**Casilla** (2–4)	Britton (37)	41,268	66–51
118	August 15	Pirates	5–8	Vogelsong (2–2)	**Moore** (0–2)		41,850	66–52
119	August 16	Pirates	3–4	Bastardo (1–0)	**Law** (4–2)	Watson (6)	41,185	66–53
120	August 17	Pirates	5–6	Nicasio (9–6)	**Cain** (4–8)	Watson (7)	41,139	66–54
121	August 18	Mets	10–7	**Bumgarner** (12–7)	deGrom (7–6)	**Casilla** (28)	41,517	67–54
122	August 19	Mets	8–1	**Cueto** (14–3)	Lugo (0–2)	—	41,434	68–54
123	August 20	Mets	5–9	Colón (11–7)	**Moore** (0–3)	—	41,125	68–55
124	August 21	Mets	0–2	Syndergaard (11–7)	**Samardzija** (10–9)	Familia (41)	41,377	68–56
125	August 23	@ Dodgers	5–9	Maeda (13–7)	**Bumgarner** (12–8)	Jansen (36)	46,899	68–57
126	August 24	@ Dodgers	0–1	Hill (1–0)	**Cueto** (14–4)	Jansen (37)	43,957	68–58
127	August 25	@ Dodgers	4–0	**Moore** (1–3)	Stripling (3–5)	—	53,297	69–58
128	August 26	Braves	7–0	**Samardzija** (11–9)	De La Cruz (0–7)	—	41,283	70–58
129	August 27	Braves	1–3	Foltynewicz (7–5)	**Suárez** (3–2)	Johnson (13)	41,635	70–59
130	August 28	Braves	13–4	**Bumgarner** (13–8)	Blair (0–6)	—	41,675	71–59
132	August 30	Diamondbacks	3–4	Greinke (12–4)	**Cueto** (14–5)	Hudson (2)	41,443	71–60
133	August 31	Diamondbacks	4–2	**Moore** (2–3)	Miller (2–10)	**Casilla** (29)	41,447	72–60

September (13–15)

#	Date	Opponent	Score	Win	Loss	Save	Attendance	Record
134	September 1	@ Cubs	4–5	Smith (1–0)	**Strickland** (3–2)	Edwards (1)	38,536	72–61
135	September 2	@ Cubs	1–2	Lester (15–4)	**Suárez** (3–3)	—	40,818	72–62
136	September 3	@ Cubs	3–2	**Bumgarner** (14–8)	Arrieta (16–6)	**Casilla** (30)	41,250	73–62
137	September 4	@ Cubs	2–3 (13)	Cahill (4–4)	**Reynolds** (0–1)	—	41,293	73–63
138	September 5	@ Rockies	0–6	Bettis (12–7)	**Moore** (2–4)	—	26,574	73–64
138	September 6	@ Rockies	3–2	**López** (1–2)	Ottavino (0–2)	**Casilla** (31)	22,437	74–64
140	September 7	@ Rockies	5–6	Lyles (4–4)	**Osich** (1–3)	—	23,961	74–65
140	September 9	@ Diamondbacks	7–6 (12)	**Nathan** (2–0)	Leone (0–1)	**Gearrin** (3)	26,492	75–65
141	September 10	@ Diamondbacks	11–3	**Cueto** (15–5)	Bradley (6–9)	—	32,301	76–65
142	September 11	@ Diamondbacks	5–3	**Moore** (3–4)	Greinke (12–6)	**Strickland** (3)	26,008	77–65
143	September 12	Padres	0–4	Clemens (3–5)	**Samardzija** (11–10)	—	41,233	77–66
144	September 13	Padres	4–6	Smith (1–0)	**Strickland** (3–3)	Quackenbush (2)	41,231	77–67
145	September 14	Padres	1–3	Perdomo (8–9)	**Bumgarner** (14–9)	Maurer (10)	41,183	77–68
146	September 15	Cardinals	6–2	**Cueto** (16–5)	Wainwright (11–9)	—	41,210	78–68
147	September 16	Cardinals	8–2	**Moore** (4–4)	Weaver (1–3)	—	41,278	79–68
148	September 17	Cardinals	2–3	Oh (5–3)	**Casilla** (2–5)	—	41,403	79–69
149	September 18	Cardinals	0–3	Reyes (3–1)	**Suárez** (3–4)	Oh (18)	41,324	79–70
150	September 19	@ Dodgers	1–2	Blanton (6–2)	**López** (1–3)	—	43,435	79–71
151	September 20	@ Dodgers	2–0	**Cueto** (17–5)	Hill (3–2)	**Romo** (1)	53,621	80–71
152	September 21	@ Dodgers	3–9	Maeda (16–9)	**Moore** (4–5)	—	45,983	80–72
153	September 22	@ Padres	2–1	**Samardzija** (12–10)	Friedrich (5–11)	**Romo** (2)	25,789	81–72
154	September 23	@ Padres	2–7	Jackson (5–6)	**Suárez** (3–5)	—	28,404	81–73
155	September 24	@ Padres	9–6 (10)	**Smith** (1–1)	Quackenbush (7–7)	**Romo** (3)	31,171	82–73
156	September 25	@ Padres	3–4	Morrow (1–0)	**Gearrin** (3–2)	Hand (1)	28,456	82–74
157	September 27	Rockies	12–3	**Moore** (5–5)	Márquez (1–1)	—	41,582	83–74
158	September 28	Rockies	0–2	Chatwood (12–9)	**Samardzija** (12–11)	Ottavino (9)	41,426	83–75
159	September 29	Rockies	7–2	**Cueto** (18–5)	Gray (10–10)	—	41,275	84–75
160	September 30	Dodgers	9–3	**Bumgarner** (15–9)	McCarthy (2–3)	—	41,359	85–75

October (2–0)

#	Date	Opponent	Score	Win	Loss	Save	Attendance	Record
161	October 1	Dodgers	3–0	**Blach** (2–0)	Kershaw (12–4)	**Romo** (4)	41,320	86–75
162	October 2	Dodgers	7–1	**Moore** (6–5)	Maeda (16–11)	—	41,445	87–75

=== Postseason ===
2016 Postseason Game Log
National League Wild Card Game (1–0)

Game	Date	Opponent	Score	Win	Loss	Save	Attendance	Series
1	October 5	@ Mets	3–0	**Bumgarner** (1–0)	Familia (0–1)	—	44,747	1–0

National League Division Series (1–3)

#	Date	Opponent	Score	Win	Loss	Save	Attendance	Series
1	October 7	@ Cubs	0–1	Lester (1–0)	**Cueto** (0–1)	Chapman (1)	42,148	0–1
2	October 8	@ Cubs	2–5	Wood (1–0)	**Samardzija** (0–1)	Chapman (2)	42,392	0–2
3	October 10	Cubs	6–5 (13)	**Blach** (1–0)	Montgomery (0–1)	—	43,571	1–2
4	October 11	Cubs	5–6	Rondón (1–0)	**Smith** (0–1)	Chapman (3)	43,166	1–3
**Giants lose series 1–3**

== Roster ==
2016 San Francisco Giants
Roster
Pitchers: 50 Ty Blach; 57 Michael Broadway; 40 Madison Bumgarner; 18 Matt Cain; 46 Santiago Casilla; 47 Johnny Cueto; 62 Cory Gearrin; 53 Chris Heston; 70 George Kontos; 64 Derek Law; 49 Javier López; 32 Vin Mazzaro; 45 Matt Moore; 74 Joe Nathan; 48 Steven Okert; 61 Josh Osich; 22 Jake Peavy; 57 Matt Reynolds; 54 Sergio Romo; 29 Jeff Samardzija; 13 Will Smith; 68 Chris Stratton; 60 Hunter Strickland; 56 Albert Suárez	Catchers: 14 Trevor Brown; 28 Buster Posey; Infielders: 1,13 Ehíré Adríanza; 17 Gordon Beckham; 9 Brandon Belt; 35 Brandon Crawford; 5 Matt Duffy; 21 Conor Gillaspie; 38 Grant Green; 10 Eduardo Núñez; 12 Joe Panik; 1 Ramiro Peña; 17 Rubén Tejada; 37 Kelby Tomlinson	Outfielders: 7 Gregor Blanco; 66 Gorkys Hernández; 16 Ángel Pagán; 6 Jarrett Parker; 8 Hunter Pence; 2 Denard Span; 51 Mac Williamson	Manager: 15 Bruce Bochy; Coaches: -- Chad Chop (special assistant); -- Shawon Dunston (special assistant); 33 Steve Decker (assistant hitting); 26 Mark Gardner (bullpen); 58 Bill Hayes (first base); 39 Roberto Kelly (third base); 31 Hensley Meulens (hitting); 19 Dave Righetti (pitching); 99 Taira Uematsu (bullpen catcher); 88 Eli Whiteside (bullpen catcher); 23 Ron Wotus (bench)

== Postseason ==
=== Wild Card ===
Despite having claimed the Wild Card spot on the final day of the regular season, the Giants were able to tab ace Madison Bumgarner for the Wild Card game start. Bumgarner had an excellent regular season for the Giants, finishing with a career-low in ERA and a career-high in strikeouts, finishing fourth in the National League in both categories. On the hill for the New York Mets was Noah Syndergaard, who himself finished 3rd in the NL in ERA and 9th in strikeouts. The pitching matchup didn't disappoint, it took until the bottom of the third inning for the game's first hit and baserunner, with Syndergaard striking out four straight batters on two occasions. The closest either side came to scoring was in the top of the 6th when, after Denard Span singled and stole second base with two outs, Brandon Belt hit a long fly ball to center field which was caught on the dead run by Curtis Granderson, smashing into the wall and holding on. Syndergaard exited after 7 innings, having struck out 10. Crucially as it turned out, the Giants had forced Syndergaard out of the game with Bumgarner still going strong. Another golden opportunity was squandered by the Giants in the top of the 8th inning, when Addison Reed struck out Hunter Pence to end the inning with the bases loaded. After Bumgarner left a runner in scoring position in the bottom of the 8th, the game moved to the 9th with the Mets bringing in closer Jeurys Familia. Brandon Crawford led the inning off with a double to left-center, but Ángel Pagán couldn't lay down the sacrifice bunt and then struck out. Joe Panik worked a walk and Conor Gillaspie stepped up to the plate to launch a three-run home run to right field. Gillaspie had only started the game because Eduardo Núñez was still dealing with a hamstring injury and had to be left off the roster. Bumgarner then got the final three outs, completing the shutout just as he had done in the 2014 Wild Card Game. Bumgarner made 119 pitches, allowed just 6 total baserunners, striking out 6 and setting an MLB record of 23 consecutive scoreless innings pitched in postseason elimination games. With the win, the Giants equalled the Major League record for consecutive postseason series wins with 11, also extending their streak of postseason elimination game wins to 9.

Wednesday, October 5, 2016 – 8:07 p.m. (EDT) at Citi Field in New York City

Team	1	2	3	4	5	6	7	8	9	R	H	E
San Francisco Giants	0	0	0	0	0	0	0	0	3	3	5	0
New York Mets	0	0	0	0	0	0	0	0	0	0	4	0
WP: Madison Bumgarner (1–0) LP: Jeurys Familia (0–1); Home runs: SF: Conor Gillaspie (1); NYM: None; Attendance: 44,747

=== Division Series ===
==== Game 1, October 7 ====
The Giants started 18-game winner Johnny Cueto in Game 1 of the NLDS, while the Cubs countered with 19-game winner Jon Lester. Just as in the Wild Card game, both starting pitchers lived up to the billing, and dominated the opposing team's lineup. Also as in that game, the Giants had slightly more opportunities to score in the early innings, but were unable to take advantage of them. The Giants had the leadoff man on base in each of the first three innings, but the Cubs, with the help of a caught stealing and a successful pickoff play at first base were able to wipe the runners off base quickly. Lester seemed to improve as the game went on, and the Giants found it difficult to have extended at bats against him. After 8 dominant innings in which he made just 86 pitches, Lester looked set to come out of the game, as his spot in the lineup along with the spot of his catcher David Ross were due up, and it looked as though Cubs manager Joe Maddon would decide to pinch-hit for them both. In the end before the game reached that point, Javier Báez cranked a home run to left-field off Cueto which would ultimately seal the game. Cueto nonetheless pitched superbly, striking out 10 in his 8 innings of work and allowing just three hits in total. Neither starter walked a batter. Though Buster Posey doubled with two outs off Cubs closer Aroldis Chapman to give the Giants a faint hope, Hunter Pence grounded out to end the game and give the Cubs the lead in the series.

October 7, 2016 9:15 PM EDT at Wrigley Field in Chicago, Illinois
Team	1	2	3	4	5	6	7	8	9	R	H	E
San Francisco Giants	0	0	0	0	0	0	0	0	0	0	6	0
Chicago Cubs	0	0	0	0	0	0	0	1	x	1	3	0
WP: Jon Lester (1–0) LP: Johnny Cueto (0–1) Sv: Aroldis Chapman (1); Home runs: SF: None; CHC: Javier Báez (1); Attendance: 42,148

==== Game 2, October 8 ====
The Giants started former Cub, Jeff Samardzija in Game 2. Samardzija had pitched well for the Giants down the stretch, but only lasted four innings in his last appearance at Wrigley Field. Unfortunately for the Giants, Samardzija produced a similar effort this time. Dexter Fowler led off the bottom of the 1st inning with a double and was eventually brought in to score on a two-out base hit by Ben Zobrist. The second inning proved Samardzija's undoing as he loaded the bases with nobody out on the way to giving up three more runs in the frame. A 4-run deficit to the Major League leader in ERA Kyle Hendricks appeared to be a large one already, but the Giants did bring themselves briefly back into the game. Joe Panik produced a leadoff double and that was followed by another from pinch-hitter Gregor Blanco spelling the end of the night for Samardzija. Blanco was brought in to score on a sacrifice fly from Brandon Belt and the Giants had halved the deficit. However, those were to be the only runs they would score. In the 4th inning, Hendricks took a line drive off the bat of Ángel Pagán off his arm and eventually decided to leave the game. This proved not to help the Giants as, not only did the Cubs bullpen shut them down the rest of the way, but also Travis Wood, brought on to relieve Hendricks, launched a solo home-run off George Kontos to pad the Cubs lead in the bottom half of the 4th. This was just the second time a relief pitcher has homered in a postseason game, the last time being in 1924. Aroldis Chapman locked down the save again, and the Giants were faced with elimination in Game 3.

October 8, 2016 8:08 PM EDT at Wrigley Field in Chicago, Illinois
Team	1	2	3	4	5	6	7	8	9	R	H	E
San Francisco Giants	0	0	2	0	0	0	0	0	0	2	6	1
Chicago Cubs	1	3	0	1	0	0	0	0	x	5	9	3
WP: Travis Wood (1–0) LP: Jeff Samardzija (0–1) Sv: Aroldis Chapman (2); Home runs: SF: None; CHC: Travis Wood (1); Attendance: 42,392

==== Game 3, October 10 ====
Facing a possible sweep, the Giants were able to call on Madison Bumgarner to take the mound and try to extend their streak of elimination game wins. As a mark of the strength of the Cubs rotation, they were able to start an 18-game winner and the reigning Cy Young Award winner Jake Arrieta. Bumgarner wasn't especially sharp and he struggled to put away hitters in the second inning, culminating in a three-run home run with two strikes to Arrieta. The Giants were staring down the barrel with a 3–0 deficit. Buster Posey singled home Denard Span in the third and the Giants narrowed the gap to one in the 5th inning, with Span again the catalyst, tripling and scoring on Brandon Belt's sacrifice fly. Bumgarner left the game after five innings and the bullpen managed to keep the Cubs in check. There looked to be a major turning point in the bottom of the 6th inning, when a play at first was reviewed. After a spectacular sliding save from Javier Báez at one end, it appeared from multiple angles that first baseman Anthony Rizzo may have taken his foot off the base, but much to the consternation of the crowd, the call stood as called, wiping out a lead-off runner as the Giants were running out of time. In the bottom of the 8th inning, Belt singled to lead off the inning off Travis Wood, and Héctor Rondón walked Posey. With two on and nobody out, Joe Maddon called on Aroldis Chapman for a six out save. After Hunter Pence struck out, Wild Card hero Conor Gillaspie lined a two-run triple to the gap in right-center to turn the tables and give the Giants the one-run lead. Brandon Crawford then singled through the drawn-in infield and the Giants had an insurance run to lead 5–3. Crawford then stole second base, and advanced to third on an errant throw but the Giants weren't able to cash him in. Sergio Romo came in to try to close out the game, but Dexter Fowler drew a walk on 8 pitches and Kris Bryant sent a deep fly ball to left field that hit the top of the wall and bounced over for a game-tying two-run home run. The 9th inning had been a huge problem for the Giants all season, and that problem had surfaced again at a crucial time. Romo did manage to pitch through the inning without surrendering the lead, and the game went to extra innings. In the end, it was a battle of two left-handed long relievers to see who would crack first, Ty Blach for the Giants and Mike Montgomery for the Cubs. Crawford led off the bottom of the 13th inning with a double, and that was followed by a walk-off double off the high wall in right field by Joe Panik, and the Giants ensured there would be a Game 4 in the series.

October 10, 2016 9:38 PM EDT at AT&T Park in San Francisco, California
Team	1	2	3	4	5	6	7	8	9	10	11	12	13	R	H	E
Chicago Cubs	0	3	0	0	0	0	0	0	2	0	0	0	0	5	10	2
San Francisco Giants	0	0	1	0	1	0	0	3	0	0	0	0	1	6	13	1
WP: Ty Blach (1–0) LP: Mike Montgomery (0–1); Home runs: CHC: Jake Arrieta (1), Kris Bryant (1); SF: None; Attendance: 43,571

==== Game 4, October 11 ====
The Giants turned to trade deadline acquisition Matt Moore to keep them in the series. Moore, who had pitched in the Game 162 win to see the Giants into the postseason would be opposed by John Lackey for the Cubs. The early going was good for the Giants as Denard Span doubled to lead off the Giants half of the 1st, and came into score on a sacrifice fly from Buster Posey. Though David Ross would homer to lead off the 3rd inning, the Giants would soon be back on top. With the bases loaded and 1 out in the bottom of the 4th, Moore singled home the go-ahead run, and another would come into score as Lackey couldn't maintain contact with first base as the Cubs attempted to double up Span. A throwing error from Brandon Crawford that allowed Javier Báez to reach third led to a Ross sacrifice fly that immediately cut the Giants lead to 1 in the 5th. The Giants were to hit right back as, after Hunter Pence singled with one out in the bottom half of the inning, Crawford made amends by launching a double that would have been a home run were it not for a short section of railing on the top of the wall of Levi's Landing. Both runners would come into score anyway as Conor Gillaspie came through again with an RBI base hit (one of four hits in the game for him), and Joe Panik hit a sacrifice fly to give the Giants a 5–2 lead. The Cubs bullpen again shut the Giants down the rest of the way, but Moore was gradually becoming the story in the game. After 8 innings, Moore had delivered 120 pitches, surrendering just 2 hits, 2 walks and 2 runs (one unearned) whilst striking out 10. However, in a stunning turn of events, five Giants relief pitchers combined to blow the game and the season in the 9th inning. Derek Law allowed a leadoff hit to Kris Bryant, Javier López walked Anthony Rizzo and Sergio Romo gave up an RBI double to Ben Zobrist setting up the tying runs in scoring position. Will Smith then entered to allow the tying hit to pinch-hitter Willson Contreras. Finally an out was recorded as Jason Heyward's sacrifice bunt ended up in a force play at second, but another Crawford error allowed Heyward to reach second base. Baez then came through for the Cubs again to bring in Heyward for the go-ahead run off Hunter Strickland. The Giants had blown another 9th inning lead, and didn't have a win in the 9th inning when trailing all season. Aroldis Chapman promptly struck out the side to eliminate the Giants. With the loss several streaks ended, the Giants equal MLB record 11 straight postseason series win streak, their MLB record 10 game elimination game win streak, and also their even-year World Series win streak dating back to 2010.

October 11, 2016 8:40 PM EDT at AT&T Park in San Francisco, California
Team	1	2	3	4	5	6	7	8	9	R	H	E
Chicago Cubs	0	0	1	0	1	0	0	0	4	6	6	0
San Francisco Giants	1	0	0	2	2	0	0	0	0	5	11	2
WP: Héctor Rondón (1–0) LP: Will Smith (0–1) Sv: Aroldis Chapman (3); Home runs: CHC: David Ross (1); SF: None; Attendance: 43,166

=== Postseason rosters ===
Playoff rosters
National League Wild Card Game

- Pitchers: 13 Will Smith 29 Jeff Samardzija 40 Madison Bumgarner 46 Santiago Casilla 47 Johnny Cueto 48 Steven Okert 49 Javier López 54 Sergio Romo 60 Hunter Strickland 64 Derek Law 70 George Kontos
- Catchers: 14 Trevor Brown 28 Buster Posey
- Infielders: 1 Ehire Adrianza 9 Brandon Belt 12 Joe Panik 21 Conor Gillaspie 35 Brandon Crawford 37 Kelby Tomlinson
- Outfielders: 2 Denard Span 6 Jarrett Parker 7 Gregor Blanco 8 Hunter Pence 16 Ángel Pagán 66 Gorkys Hernández

National League Division Series

- Pitchers: 13 Will Smith 29 Jeff Samardzija 40 Madison Bumgarner 45 Matt Moore 46 Santiago Casilla 47 Johnny Cueto 49 Javier López 50 Ty Blach 54 Sergio Romo 60 Hunter Strickland 64 Derek Law 70 George Kontos
- Catchers: 14 Trevor Brown 28 Buster Posey
- Infielders: 9 Brandon Belt 10 Eduardo Núñez 12 Joe Panik 21 Conor Gillaspie 35 Brandon Crawford 37 Kelby Tomlinson
- Outfielders: 2 Denard Span 7 Gregor Blanco 8 Hunter Pence 16 Ángel Pagán 66 Gorkys Hernández

== Statistics ==
=== Batting ===
Note: G = Games played; AB = At bats; R = Runs scored; H = Hits; 2B = Doubles; 3B = Triples; HR = Home runs; RBI = Runs batted in; BB = Base on balls; SO = Strikeouts; AVG = Batting average; OPS = On base plus slugging percentage; SB = Stolen bases

Player	G	AB	R	H	2B	3B	HR	RBI	BB	SO	AVG	OPS	SB
Ehíré Adríanza, IF	40	63	3	16	2	0	2	7	2	13	.254	.679	0
Gordon Beckham, 3B	3	5	0	0	0	0	0	1	0	2	.000	.000	0
Brandon Belt, 1B	156	542	77	149	41	8	17	82	104	148	.275	.868	0
Ty Blach, P	4	4	1	2	0	0	0	0	0	0	.500	1.000	0
Gregor Blanco, OF	106	241	28	54	10	4	1	18	29	51	.224	.620	6
Trevor Brown, C	75	173	17	41	7	0	5	19	10	39	.237	.647	0
Madison Bumgarner, P	36	86	8	16	6	0	3	9	10	43	.186	.629	0
Matt Cain, P	21	27	1	2	1	0	1	5	0	17	.074	.296	0
Brandon Crawford, SS	155	553	67	152	28	11	12	84	57	115	.275	.772	7
Johnny Cueto, P	32	70	1	8	0	0	0	5	2	24	.114	.251	0
Matt Duffy, 3B	70	257	32	65	11	2	4	21	20	40	.253	.671	8
Cory Gearrin, P	56	1	0	1	0	0	0	0	0	0	1.000	2.000	0
Conor Gillaspie, 3B	101	191	24	50	8	4	6	25	12	28	.262	.747	1
Grant Green, 2B	18	46	7	12	2	0	1	7	3	8	.261	.670	0
Gorkys Hernández, OF	26	54	7	14	5	0	2	4	3	11	.259	.761	0
Derek Law, P	61	1	0	0	0	0	0	0	0	0	.000	.000	0
Javier López, P	68	1	0	0	0	0	0	0	0	1	.000	.000	0
Vin Mazzaro, P	2	1	0	0	0	0	0	0	0	1	.000	.000	0
Matt Moore, P	12	24	2	1	0	0	0	0	0	11	.042	.083	0
Eduardo Núñez, 3B	50	182	24	49	9	3	4	20	14	30	.269	.744	13
Steven Okert, P	16	1	0	0	0	0	0	0	0	1	.000	.000	0
Ángel Pagán, LF	129	495	71	137	24	5	12	55	42	66	.277	.750	15
Joe Panik, 2B	127	464	67	111	21	7	10	62	50	47	.239	.695	5
Jarrett Parker, OF	63	127	22	30	3	1	5	14	19	44	.236	.751	0
Jake Peavy, P	31	27	2	5	0	0	0	3	2	12	.185	.427	0
Ramiro Peña, IF	30	87	9	26	6	1	1	10	2	16	.299	.755	0
Hunter Pence, RF	106	395	58	114	23	1	13	57	43	95	.289	.808	1
Buster Posey, C, 1B	146	539	82	155	33	2	14	80	64	68	.288	.796	6
Jeff Samardzija, P	34	64	4	10	5	0	0	9	1	28	.156	.399	0
Denard Span, CF	143	572	70	152	23	5	11	53	53	79	.266	.712	12
Chris Stratton, P	7	1	0	0	0	0	0	0	0	0	.000	.000	0
Albert Suárez, P	22	21	1	4	2	0	0	2	0	11	.190	.476	0
Rubén Tejada, 3B	13	32	3	5	3	0	0	2	5	5	.156	.520	0
Kelby Tomlinson, 2B	52	106	13	31	4	0	0	6	12	18	.292	.700	5
Mac Williamson, OF	54	112	14	25	3	0	6	15	13	35	.223	.726	0
Team totals	162	5565	715	1437	280	54	130	675	572	1107	.258	.728	79

=== Pitching ===
Note: W = Wins; L = Losses; ERA = Earned run average; G = Games pitched; GS = Games started; SV = Saves; IP = Innings pitched; H = Hits allowed; R = Runs allowed; ER = Earned runs allowed; HR = Home runs allowed; BB = Walks allowed; K = Strikeouts

Player	W	L	ERA	G	GS	SV	IP	H	R	ER	HR	BB	K
Ty Blach	1	0	1.06	4	2	0	17.0	8	2	2	1	5	10
Mike Broadway	0	0	11.81	4	0	0	5.1	9	7	7	2	1	4
Madison Bumgarner	15	9	2.74	34	34	0	226.2	178	79	69	26	54	251
Matt Cain	4	8	5.64	21	17	0	89.1	103	58	56	16	32	72
Santiago Casilla	2	5	3.57	62	0	31	58.0	50	23	23	8	19	65
Johnny Cueto	18	5	2.79	32	32	0	219.2	195	71	68	15	45	198
Cory Gearrin	3	2	4.28	56	0	3	48.1	42	24	23	4	14	45
Chris Heston	1	1	10.80	4	0	0	5.0	9	6	6	0	6	3
George Kontos	3	2	2.53	57	0	0	53.1	42	19	15	3	20	35
Derek Law	4	2	2.13	61	0	1	55.0	44	13	13	3	9	50
Javier López	1	3	4.05	68	0	1	26.2	24	13	12	3	15	15
Vin Mazzaro	1	0	54.00	2	0	0	1.0	7	9	6	0	1	0
Matt Moore	6	5	4.08	12	12	0	68.1	59	31	31	5	32	69
Joe Nathan	1	0	0.00	7	0	0	4.1	3	0	0	0	2	5
Steven Okert	0	0	3.21	16	0	0	14.0	14	5	5	2	4	14
Josh Osich	1	3	4.71	59	0	0	36.1	31	20	19	7	19	25
Jake Peavy	5	9	5.54	31	21	0	118.2	134	76	73	18	36	102
Matt Reynolds	0	1	7.50	8	0	0	6.0	7	5	5	0	5	3
Sergio Romo	1	0	2.64	40	0	4	30.2	26	9	9	5	7	33
Jeff Samardzija	12	11	3.81	32	32	0	203.1	190	88	86	24	54	167
Will Smith	1	1	2.95	26	0	0	18.1	13	6	6	0	9	26
Chris Stratton	1	0	3.60	7	0	0	10.0	11	4	4	1	5	6
Hunter Strickland	3	3	3.10	72	0	3	61.0	50	21	21	4	19	57
Albert Suárez	3	5	4.29	22	12	0	84.0	84	42	40	11	26	54
Team totals	87	75	3.65	162	162	43	1460.1	1334	631	593	158	439	1309

== Farm system ==
Level	Team	League	Manager
AAA	Sacramento River Cats	Pacific Coast League	José Alguacil
AA	Richmond Flying Squirrels	Eastern League	Miguel Ojeda
A-Advanced	San Jose Giants	California League	Lipso Nava
A	Augusta GreenJackets	South Atlantic League	Nestor Rojas
A-Short Season	Salem-Keizer Volcanoes	Northwest League	Kyle Haines
Rookie	AZL Giants	Arizona League	Henry Cotto
Rookie	DSL Giants	Dominican Summer League	
