= 2016 National League Wild Card Game =

	1	2	3	4	5	6	7	8	9	R	H	E
San Francisco Giants	0	0	0	0	0	0	0	0	3	3	5	0
New York Mets	0	0	0	0	0	0	0	0	0	0	4	0
- Date: October 5, 2016
- Venue: Citi Field
- City: Queens, New York
- Managers: Bruce Bochy (San Francisco Giants); Terry Collins (New York Mets)
- Umpires: C. B. Bucknor, Mike Everitt, Jeff Nelson, Mike Winters (crew chief), Quinn Wolcott and Jim Wolf; Replay: Scott Barry and Mark Carlson
- Attendance: 44,747
- Ceremonial first pitch: Michael Fahy Jr. (Note: Fahy's father, a deputy chief in the New York City Fire Department, was killed in the line of duty on September 27, 2016.)
- Television: ESPN
- TV announcers: Dan Shulman, Jessica Mendoza, Aaron Boone, and Buster Olney
- Radio: ESPN
- Radio announcers: Dave O'Brien and Jim Bowden

The 2016 National League Wild Card Game was a play-in game during Major League Baseball's (MLB) 2016 postseason played between the National League's (NL) two wild card teams, the New York Mets and the San Francisco Giants. As both teams finished with identical 87–75 records, a tiebreaker was used to determine the host team. In accordance with MLB tiebreaking rules, the Mets earned the right to host the game by winning their season series against the Giants 4–3.

The game was played on October 5, 2016 at Citi Field in Queens, New York, and the winner advanced to play the first-seeded Chicago Cubs in the NL Division Series. It was televised in the United States on ESPN.

The Giants defeated the Mets, 3–0.

== Background ==
This was New York's third postseason appearance as a Wild Card team, following 1999 and 2000. This was their second consecutive postseason appearance after winning the National League pennant the previous season. Meanwhile, this was also San Francisco's third postseason appearance as a Wild Card team, following 2002 and 2014, the latter of which they went on to win the World Series. This was their fourth postseason appearance in seven years.

This was the second postseason meeting between the Mets and the Giants, New York won the only previous meeting in the 2000 National League Division Series in four games.

== Game results ==
=== Line score ===
October 5, 2016 8:08 pm (EDT) at Citi Field in Queens, New York, 62 °F (17 °C), clear
Team	1	2	3	4	5	6	7	8	9	R	H	E
San Francisco	0	0	0	0	0	0	0	0	3	3	5	0
New York	0	0	0	0	0	0	0	0	0	0	4	0
WP: Madison Bumgarner (1–0) LP: Jeurys Familia (0–1); Home runs: SF: Conor Gillaspie (1); NYM: None; Attendance: 44,747; Boxscore

With the winner advancing and the loser finished for the year, each team sent its best starting pitcher to the mound, and the game was a pitchers' duel between the Mets' Noah Syndergaard and the Giants' Madison Bumgarner. Syndergaard did not allow a hit until the sixth inning, and finished with seven scoreless innings and ten strikeouts. On the other side, Bumgarner matched zeroes with Syndergaard. In the top of the sixth, with two outs and a runner on second, Curtis Granderson made a solid catch in center field on a drive by Brandon Belt to preserve the shutout. In the top of the eighth, reliever Addison Reed allowed the Giants to load the bases with two outs on a single and two walks (one intentional), but struck out Hunter Pence to end the inning. In the bottom of the inning, with a runner on second, a hard line drive by Asdrúbal Cabrera right at Bumgarner ended the threat.

In the top of the ninth, Mets closer Jeurys Familia allowed a leadoff double to Brandon Crawford, then after Angel Pagan struck out and Joe Panik walked, journeyman infielder Conor Gillaspie hit a three-run home run to deep right to break the scoreless tie and give the Giants a 3−0 lead. In the bottom of the ninth, Bumgarner returned to the mound and set down the Mets in order for a complete-game shutout. Exactly as he had done in the 2014 National League Wild Card Game, Bumgarner had tossed a four-hit shutout to send the Giants to the NLDS.

== In popular culture ==
The Strokes frontman Julian Casablancas, a lifelong fan of the Mets, wrote the 2020 song "Ode to the Mets" while waiting for the 7 train at Mets-Willets Point station immediately following the game; The song is the closing track on The Strokes' 2020 album The New Abnormal. Fabrizio Moretti, the band's drummer, has stated that both the Mets and the song evoke “something that you set your heart to and that you love unconditionally but that continues to disappoint you.”
