= Casey Gillaspie =

American baseball player (born 1993)

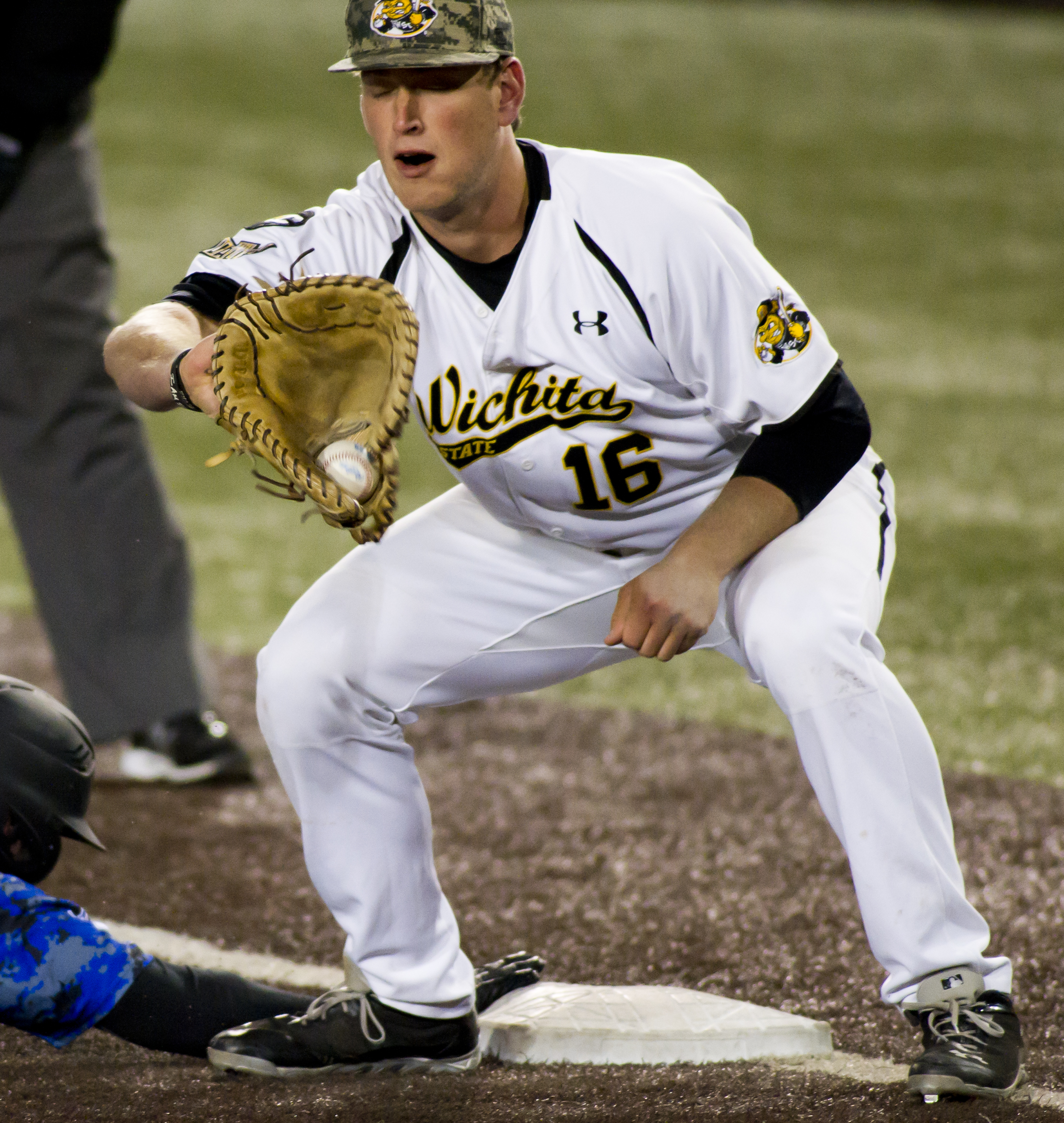
- Gillaspie with Wichita State in 2013
- First baseman
- Born: January 25, 1993 (age 33); Omaha, Nebraska, U.S.
- Bats: Switch Throws: Left
- Stats at Baseball Reference

Casey Harold Gillaspie (born January 25, 1993) is an American former professional baseball first baseman. He played college baseball at Wichita State. He was drafted by the Tampa Bay Rays in the first round of the 2014 MLB draft, and traded to the Chicago White Sox in 2017. Despite his draft status, and spending time on Chicago's 40-man roster, he never played in Major League Baseball (MLB).

== Career ==
=== Amateur ===
Gillaspie attended Millard North High School in Omaha, Nebraska. As a senior, he was the Nebraska Gatorade Baseball Player of the Year.

As a freshman at Wichita State University in 2012, he started 57 of 59 games at either first base or designated hitter. He finished the year hitting .274 with eight home runs. After the 2012 season, Gillaspie played collegiate summer baseball in the Northwoods League, for the Eau Claire Express, where he broke the team single season HR record, with 12. He started all 66 games as a sophomore for WSU in 2013, hitting .299 with 11 home runs. In the summer of 2013, Gillaspie played with the Falmouth Commodores of the Cape Cod Baseball League, where he was named a league all-star, and led the league in home runs with eight. As a junior in 2014, he hit .389/.520/.682 with 15 home runs in 59 games for WSU.

=== Tampa Bay Rays ===
The Tampa Bay Rays selected Gillaspie in the first round, 20th overall, of the 2014 Major League Baseball draft. He signed on June 10 and was assigned to the Hudson Valley Renegades, where he posted a .262 batting average with seven home runs and 42 RBIs. Gillaspie began the 2015 season with the Bowling Green Hot Rods, and after batting .278 with 16 home runs and 44 RBIs, was promoted to the Charlotte Stone Crabs in June, where he finished the season, batting .146 with one home run in 13 games. In 2016, Gillaspie spent time with both the Montgomery Biscuits and the Durham Bulls, posting a combined .284 batting average with 18 home runs, 64 RBIs and an .866 OPS between the two clubs. He began 2017 with Durham.

=== Chicago White Sox ===
On July 27, 2017, the Rays traded Gillaspie to the Chicago White Sox for Dan Jennings. The White Sox assigned him to the Charlotte Knights. In 125 total games between Durham and Charlotte, he batted .223 with 15 home runs and 62 RBIs. The White Sox added him to their 40-man roster after the 2017 season. In April 2018, he was outrighted off the 40-man roster. He was released by the organization on March 24, 2019.

=== Kansas City T-Bones ===
On April 3, 2019, Gillaspie signed with the Kansas City T-Bones of the independent American Association. He became a free agent following the season.

=== Eastern Reyes del Tigre ===
In July 2020, Gillaspie signed on to play for the Eastern Reyes del Tigre of the Constellation Energy League (a makeshift four-team independent league created as a result of the COVID-19 pandemic) for the 2020 season. He was subsequently named to the league's all-star team.

=== Kansas City Monarchs ===
On May 6, 2021, Gillaspie signed with the Kansas City Monarchs of the American Association of Professional Baseball. He appeared in 98 games for the team in 2021, slashing .257/.357/.514 with 21 home runs and 70 RBI. In 2022, Gillaspie appeared in 94 contests for the Monarchs, batting .275/.387/.503 with 17 home runs and 66 RBI.

=== Sioux City Explorers ===
On January 20, 2023, Gillaspie was claimed off waivers by the Sioux City Explorers of the American Association of Professional Baseball. He was released by the team on April 18.

== Personal life ==
Gillaspie's brother, Conor, also played college baseball at Wichita State and retired from the MLB in August 2017.
