= Ramiro Peña =

Mexican baseball player (born 1985)

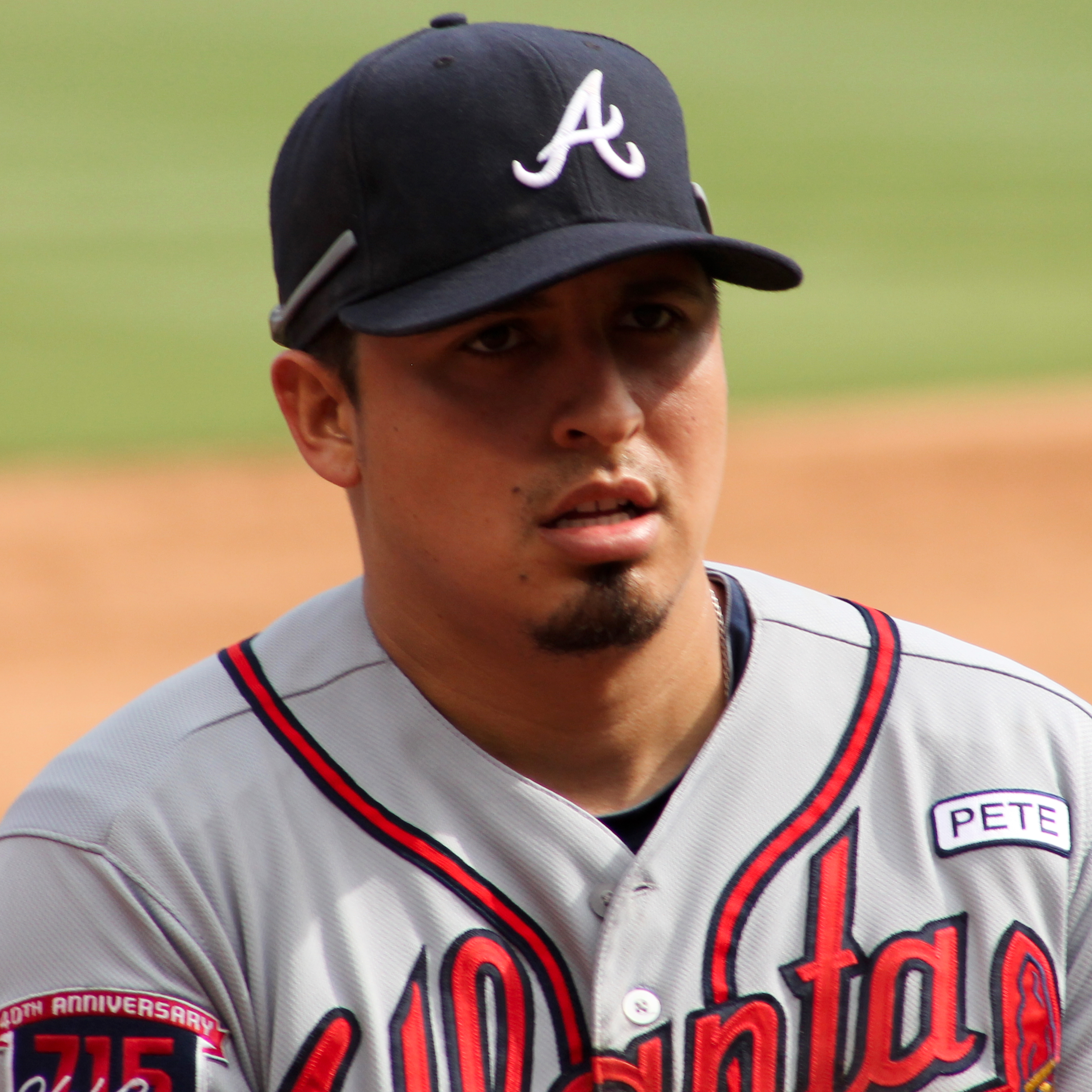
- Peña with the Atlanta Braves

Sultanes de Monterrey – No. 19
- Infielder
- Born: July 18, 1985 (age 41); Monterrey, Mexico
- Bats: Switch Throws: Right

Professional debut
- MLB: 6 April, 2009, for the New York Yankees
- NPB: 2 May, 2017, for the Hiroshima Toyo Carp

MLB statistics (through 2016 season)
- Batting average: .252
- Hits: 162
- Home runs: 9
- Runs batted in: 63

NPB statistics (through 2017 season)
- Batting average: .216
- Hits: 8
- Home runs: 0
- Runs batted in: 2
- Stats at Baseball Reference

Teams
- New York Yankees (2009–2012); Atlanta Braves (2013–2014); San Francisco Giants (2016); Hiroshima Toyo Carp (2017)

Career highlights and awards
- World Series champion (2009)

Ramiro Peña Gauna (born 18 July 1985) is a Mexican professional baseball infielder for the Sultanes de Monterrey in the Mexican League. He is also signed to the Venados de Mazatlán of the Mexican Pacific League, where he plays during the winter. He has previously played in Major League Baseball (MLB) for the New York Yankees, Atlanta Braves, and San Francisco Giants, and in Nippon Professional Baseball (NPB) for the Hiroshima Toyo Carp.

== Professional career ==
=== New York Yankees ===
Peña was signed by the New York Yankees out of the Mexican League in 2005. He played for the Tampa Yankees in the High–A Florida State League and Trenton Thunder of the Double–A Eastern League that season and in 2006. He played for Trenton in 2007 and 2008, and was selected to participate in the 2008 All-Star Futures Game.

In 2009, Peña made the Yankees Opening Day roster, beating out Ángel Berroa to be the utility infielder. He made his major league debut on 6 April 2009, appearing in the game as a pinch runner. On 9 April he got a hit in his first major league at bat, off Chris Ray of the Baltimore Orioles. On 14 April against the Tampa Bay Rays, Pena started his first career game at third base, going 0 for 3 with a walk. On 30 April, Peña got his first career run batted in in the bottom of the 8th inning against Justin Speier of the Los Angeles Angels of Anaheim by hitting a double down the right field line.

With the acquisition of Eric Hinske on 29 June 2009, Peña was optioned to the Triple-A Scranton/Wilkes-Barre Yankees of the International League to receive regular at-bats and learn to play in the outfield. Manager Joe Girardi said he expected Peña to be back with the Yankees later in the season. He was recalled to the Yankees on 7 August and sent back down on 21 August.

Peña was recalled in September when the rosters expanded. He hit his first major league home run on 28 September 2009, off of Kansas City Royals pitcher Luke Hochevar at Yankee Stadium.

Peña was added to the postseason roster after Melky Cabrera was injured in Game 4 of the 2009 World Series. The Yankees then went on to defeat the Philadelphia Phillies in 6 games.

Peña entered the 2010 season as the team's backup shortstop and utility infielder. He stayed with the big league club all year, but only managed to hit .227/.258/.247, one of the worst offensive seasons in team history. He was sent to Triple-A's Scranton/Wilkes-Barre Yankees to start the 2011 season. On 6 May, he was recalled to the majors after Eric Chavez was placed on the disabled list and sent back down on 12 May. He was recalled again in June when Derek Jeter went on the Disabled List. During this time, he committed three errors in a game against the Cincinnati Reds on 22 June. On 18 July 2011, Peña required an emergency appendectomy.

Ramiro was recalled on 25 July 2012, to replace Alex Rodriguez on the roster after Rodriguez sustained a fractured left pinkie during a game in Seattle. He was optioned back to Triple-A on 1 August 2012, after the Yankees acquired Casey McGehee from the Pittsburgh Pirates. He was designated for assignment on 1 September.

=== Atlanta Braves ===
After the 2012 season, Peña became a free agent. He signed a one-year contract worth $550,000 with the Atlanta Braves. On 20 June 2013, Peña was placed on the disabled list for right shoulder pain; it was later revealed that he would require right shoulder surgery, ending his season. After the season, Peña signed a one-year deal with the Braves, avoiding arbitration. Peña was designated for assignment by the Braves on 19 November 2014. He was outrighted to the Triple-A Gwinnett Braves on 27 November 2014. Pena refused the assignment and elected for free agency.

=== San Diego Padres ===
Peña signed a minor league deal with the San Diego Padres on 26 January 2015. On 1 April, he was reassigned to minor league camp. He played for the El Paso Chihuahuas, the Padres' Triple-A affiliate.

=== San Francisco Giants ===
On 13 December 2015, Peña signed a minor league deal with the San Francisco Giants. On 10 June 2016, the Giants purchased Peña's contract to replace the injured Kelby Tomlinson. Peña batted .299 in 30 games for the Giants starting games at second base, third base and shortstop. Peña was designated for assignment on 30 July 2016, when Hunter Pence was activated from the DL.

=== Hiroshima Toyo Carp ===
On 30 January 2017, Peña signed with the Hiroshima Toyo Carp of Nippon Professional Baseball.

=== Sultanes de Monterrey ===
On 26 February 2018, Peña signed with the Sultanes de Monterrey of the Mexican League. He was a mid-season All-Star in 2018. In 52 games, Peña hit .288/.355/.478 with nine home runs, 36 RBI, and five stolen bases.

Peña played in 93 games for the Sultanes in 2019, he hit .349/.384/.540 with 13 home runs, 64 RBI, and six stolen bases. He was also named MVP of the All–Star game. Peña did not play in a game in 2020 due to the cancellation of the Mexican League season because of the COVID-19 pandemic.

Peña returned to action in 2021, playing in 47 games and batting .332/.385/.521 with seven home runs, 27 RBI. In 2022, he made 72 appearances for Monterrey, hitting .267/.330/.405 with seven home runs, 32 RBI, and four stolen bases.

Peña played in 78 contests for the team during the 2023 campaign, batting .319/.363/.486 with 10 home runs and 41 RBI. He was also named the Defensive Player of the Year. In 2024, he played in 74 games for the Sultanes, slashing .302/.373/.471 with seven home runs, 45 RBI, and four stolen bases.

In 2025, Pena re-signed with Monterrey for a seventh season. In 63 games he hit .293/.351/.421 with 7 home runs, 40 RBIs and 2 stolen bases.

During his tenure with the team, the Sultanes reached the finals three times and won one championship.

== International career ==
Peña was selected to play for the Mexico national team in the 2013 World Baseball Classic and 2019 exhibition games against Japan.

He has also played for Tomateros de Culiacán in the 2020 Caribbean Series and the 2021 Caribbean Series.

Peña played for Mexico at the 2020 Summer Olympics (played in 2021) in Tokyo.
