= Derek Law =

American baseball player (born 1990)

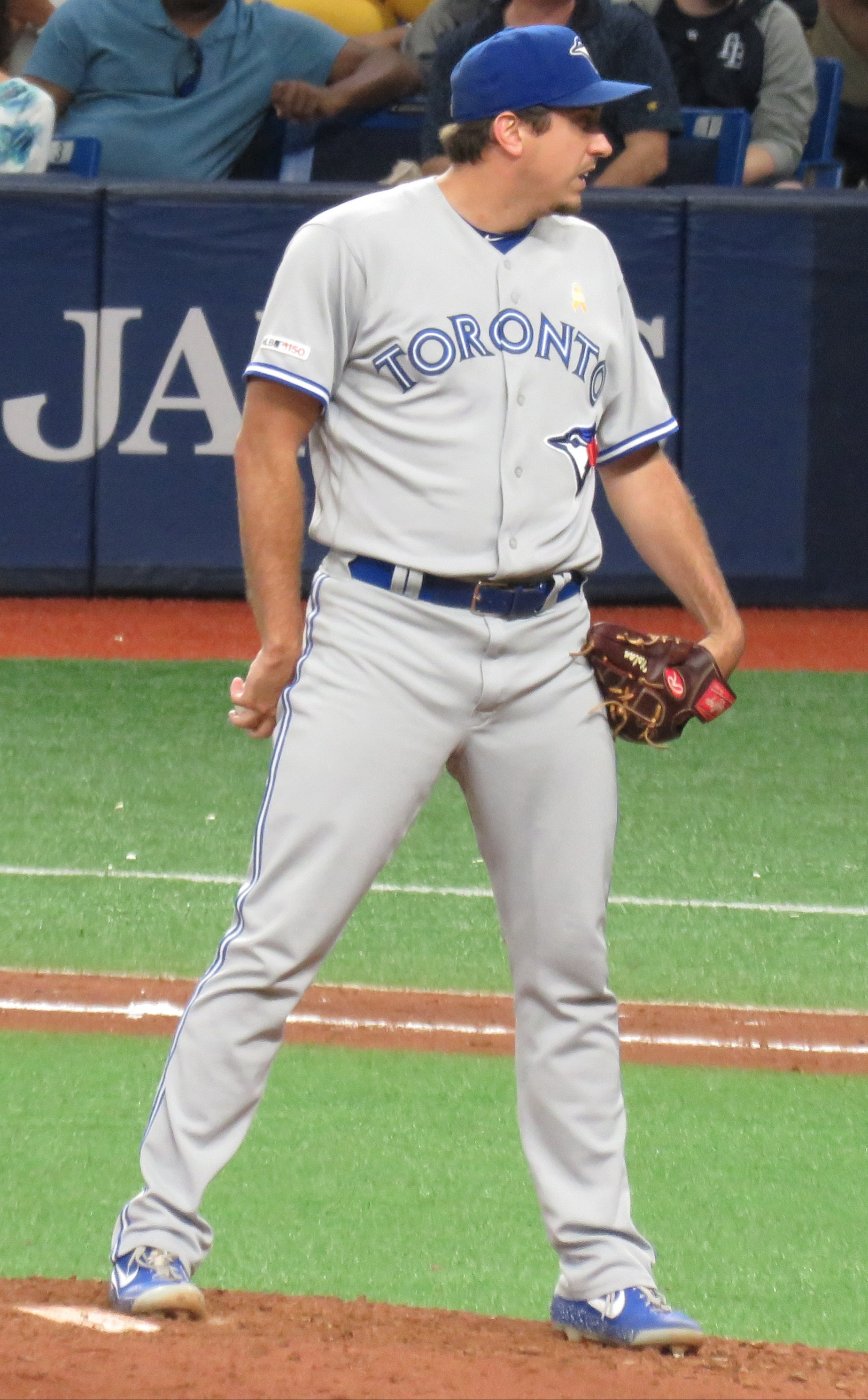
- Law with the Toronto Blue Jays

Free agent
- Pitcher
- Born: September 14, 1990 (age 36); Pittsburgh, Pennsylvania, U.S.
- Bats: Right Throws: Right

MLB debut
- April 15, 2016, for the San Francisco Giants

MLB statistics (through 2026 season)
- Win–loss record: 23–18
- Earned run average: 3.63
- Strikeouts: 321
- Stats at Baseball Reference

Teams
- San Francisco Giants (2016–2018); Toronto Blue Jays (2019); Minnesota Twins (2021); Detroit Tigers (2022); Cincinnati Reds (2022–2023); Washington Nationals (2024); Arizona Diamondbacks (2026)

Derek Robert Law (born September 14, 1990) is an American professional baseball pitcher who is a free agent. He has previously played in Major League Baseball (MLB) for the San Francisco Giants, Toronto Blue Jays, Minnesota Twins, Detroit Tigers, Cincinnati Reds, Washington Nationals, and Arizona Diamondbacks.

== Early life ==
Derek Robert Law was born on September 14, 1990, in Pittsburgh, Pennsylvania. Law attended Seton-La Salle Catholic High School in Pittsburgh, Pennsylvania, and played for the school's baseball team. He was a two-time Pittsburgh All-Area baseball selection (2008 and 2009), The Texas Rangers selected Law in the 28th round of the 2009 Major League Baseball draft, but he did not sign.

== College career ==
Law attended Miami Dade College. In his sophomore year at Miami Dade, Law posted an 8–5 win–loss record with a 2.35 earned run average (ERA) while striking out 121 batters in 92 innings pitched.

== Professional career ==
=== San Francisco Giants (2011–2018) ===
==== Minor leagues ====
The San Francisco Giants selected Law in the ninth round, with the 297th overall pick, of the 2011 Major League Baseball draft, and he signed with the Giants. He made his professional debut with the rookie-level Arizona League Giants in 2011. In 15 games he had a 2.50 ERA with 19 strikeouts over 18 innings pitched. In 2012, he pitched for the Augusta GreenJackets, posting a 2.91 ERA with 67 strikeouts over 55 2/3 innings.

Law spent the 2013 season pitching for the GreenJackets, AZL Giants and San Jose Giants. He finished the year with 2.31 ERA, 14 saves and 102 strikeouts over 66 1/3 innings. At San Jose, Law struck out 45 hitters while only walking one hitter. Prior to the 2014 season, he was invited to the Giants spring training, where he has competed for a spot in the Giants Opening Day bullpen.

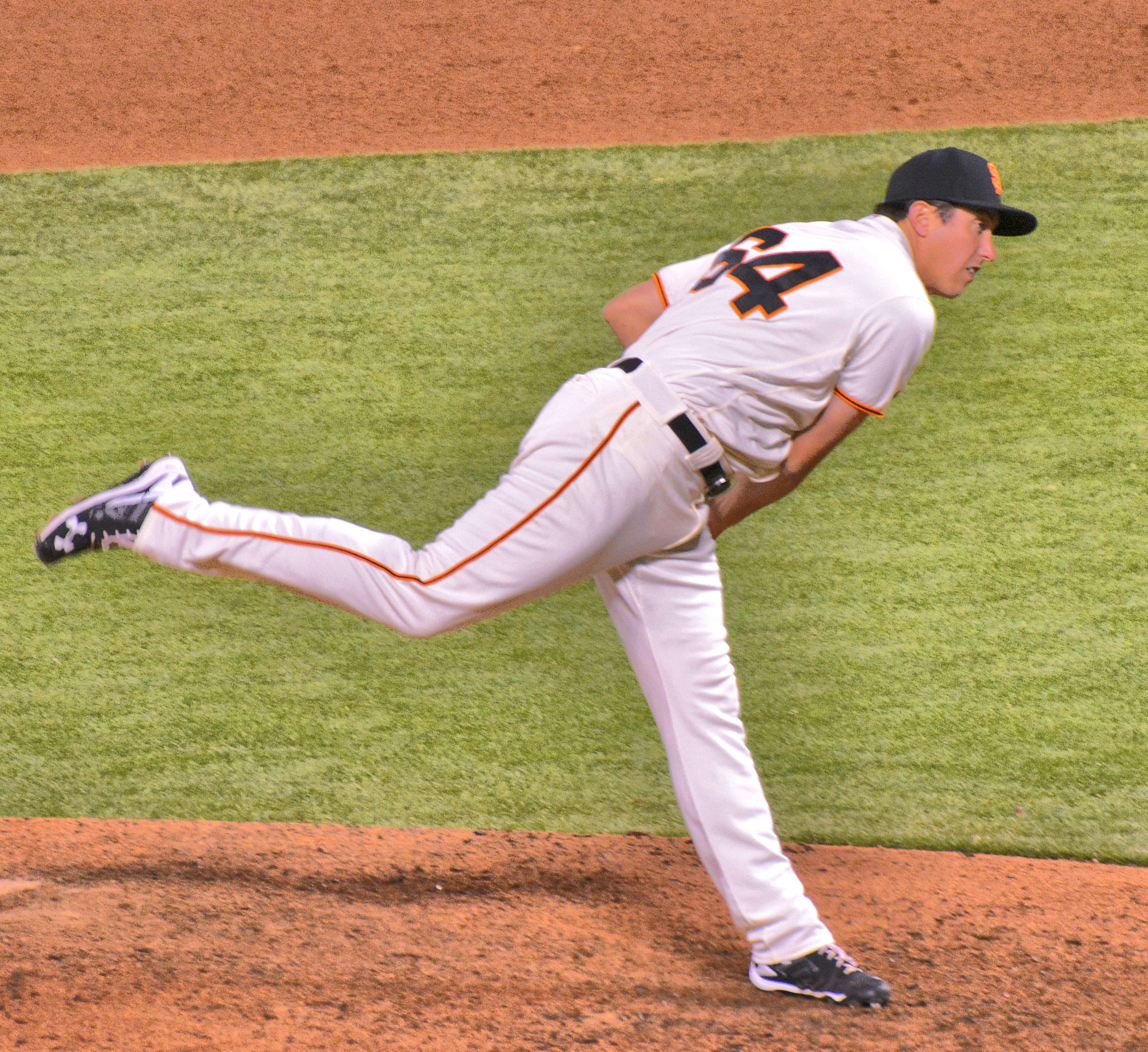
Law pitching for the San Francisco Giants in 2016

In 2014, Law pitched for the Double-A Richmond Flying Squirrels, recording 13 saves in 14 opportunities and striking out 29 in 28 innings pitched. Law underwent Tommy John surgery in June 2014 and did not return until June 2015. Law was added to the Giants' 40-man roster in November 2014 to protect him from the Rule 5 draft. In 2015, Law recorded 32 strikeouts in 25 2/3 innings for the Flying Squirrels.

Law started the 2016 season with the Triple-A Sacramento River Cats.

==== Major leagues ====
Law was called up to the San Francisco Giants on April 15, 2016, to replace the injured Sergio Romo. Law made his major league debut in a game later that day against the Los Angeles Dodgers. He entered the game in the bottom of the seventh inning and allowed one hit while striking out three batters.

On May 7, Law earned his first major league victory by holding the Colorado Rockies scoreless in one inning of relief. On June 13, Law pitched 1 1/3 scoreless innings against the Milwaukee Brewers to record his first major league save. In 61 games, he posted an ERA of 2.13 in 55 innings.

The following season, he struggled with inconsistency, posting an ERA of 5.06 in 37 1/3 innings. In 2018, he only appeared in 7 games for the Giants, spending most of his time with the Triple–A Sacramento River Cats.

=== Toronto Blue Jays (2019) ===
Law was designated for assignment on February 1, 2019, following the waiver claim of John Andreoli and outrighted on February 10. On April 2, 2019, the Giants traded Law, Alen Hanson, and Juan De Paula to the Toronto Blue Jays for Kevin Pillar. He was called up from the Triple A Buffalo Bisons on May 3. Law was non-tendered by the Blue Jays on December 2, making him a free agent.

=== Texas Rangers ===
On January 30, 2020, Law signed a minor league contract with the Texas Rangers organization. Law did not play in a game in 2020 due to the cancellation of the minor league season because of the COVID-19 pandemic. He became a free agent on November 2.

=== Minnesota Twins (2021) ===
On November 23, 2020, Law announced on Twitter that he had signed a minor league contract with the Minnesota Twins organization. On May 8, 2021, Law was selected to the active roster. After recording an 8.53 ERA in 5 games, Law was designated for assignment on May 18. He was outrighted to the Triple-A St. Paul Saints on May 20. On July 1, Law was re-selected to the active roster. Law was again designated for assignment by the Twins on September 5, after Luke Farrell was activated off of the injured list. Law made 9 appearances for the Twins in 2021, recording a 4.20 ERA with 14 strikeouts. On October 4, Law elected free agency.

=== Detroit Tigers (2022) ===
On April 9, 2022, Law signed a minor league contract with the Detroit Tigers organization. Law was assigned to the rookie–level Florida Complex League Tigers. On April 14, Law was assigned to the Triple–A Toledo Mud Hens. The Tigers promoted Law to the major leagues on July 30. Law was designated for assignment by the Tigers on August 5. He was released on August 7.

=== Cincinnati Reds (2022–2023) ===
On August 14, 2022, Law signed a minor league contract with the Cincinnati Reds and was assigned to the Triple-A Louisville Bats. He had his contract selected on August 30. He made 15 appearances for Cincinnati down the stretch, recording a 2–2 record and 4.08 ERA with 15 strikeouts in 17 2/3 innings pitched. On November 15, Law was designated for assignment. On November 18, he was non-tendered and became a free agent.

On January 23, 2023, Law re-signed with the Reds organization on a minor league contract. On March 27, the Reds announced that Law had made the Opening Day roster, and would have his contract selected to the 40-man roster. In 54 appearances for Cincinnati, he logged a 4–6 record and 3.60 ERA with 45 strikeouts across 55 innings pitched. Following the season on November 17, Law was non-tendered and became a free agent.

=== Washington Nationals (2024–2025) ===
On February 21, 2024, Law signed a minor league contract with the Washington Nationals. On March 26, Washington selected Law's contract after he made the team's Opening Day roster. He made 75 appearances out of the bullpen for the Nationals on the year, compiling a 7-4 record and 2.60 ERA with 76 strikeouts and one save over 90 innings of work.

Law began the 2025 season on the injured list due to forearm inflammation, and was transferred to the 60-day injured list on July 5, 2025. On July 18, it was announced that Law would require season-ending surgery to repair a partial tear of a flexor tendon.

=== Arizona Diamondbacks (2026-present) ===
On January 28, 2026, Law signed a minor league contract with the Arizona Diamondbacks. On August 29, the Diamondbacks selected Law's contract and promoted him to the major leagues. He made seven appearances for the Diamondbacks and had a 1.00 ERA and five strikeouts over nine innings. On September 16, Law was designated for assignment. He cleared waivers and was sent outright to the Triple–A Reno Aces on September 18. He elected free agency on October 12.

== Personal life ==
His father, Joe Law, played minor league baseball in the Oakland Athletics organization. He was called up to the majors for four days but never appeared in a game, making him a phantom ballplayer.
