= Conor Gillaspie =

American baseball player (born 1987)

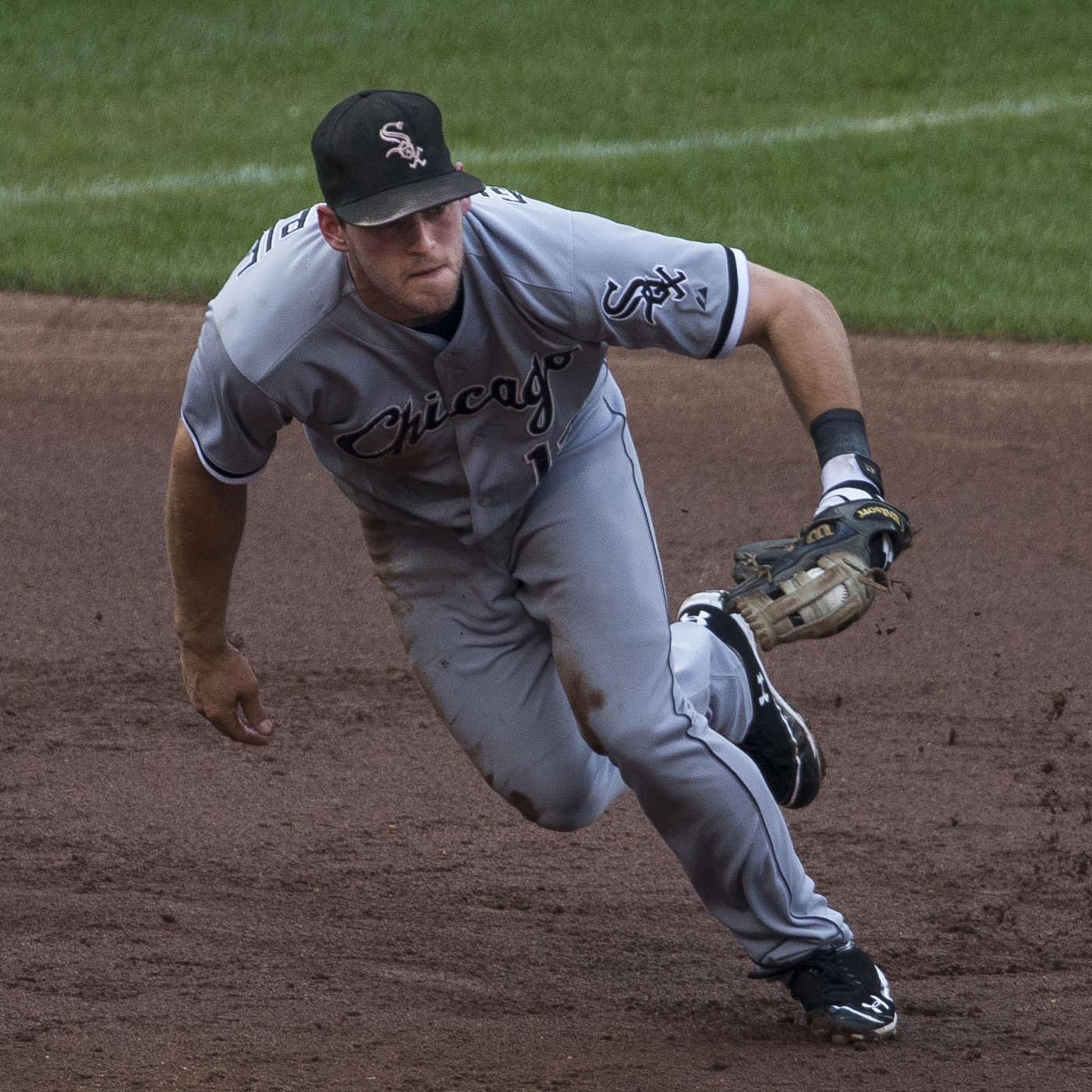
- Gillaspie with the Chicago White Sox in 2013
- Third baseman
- Born: July 18, 1987 (age 39); Omaha, Nebraska, U.S.
- Batted: Left Threw: Right

MLB debut
- September 9, 2008, for the San Francisco Giants

Last MLB appearance
- August 2, 2017, for the San Francisco Giants

MLB statistics
- Batting average: .251
- Home runs: 33
- Runs batted in: 158
- Stats at Baseball Reference

Teams
- San Francisco Giants (2008, 2011–2012); Chicago White Sox (2013–2015); Los Angeles Angels of Anaheim (2015); San Francisco Giants (2016–2017)

Conor Michael Gillaspie (born July 18, 1987) is an American former professional baseball third baseman. He played in Major League Baseball (MLB) for the San Francisco Giants, Chicago White Sox, and Los Angeles Angels of Anaheim between 2008 and 2017.

== Early life, education and amateur baseball ==
Gillaspie attended Millard North High School in Omaha, Nebraska, where he played baseball, football, and basketball. On the strength of a recommendation from umpire and fellow Nebraskan Bill McGuire, Gillaspie was recruited to play baseball at Wichita State. Gillaspie attended Wichita State University, majoring in geology, from 2006–08. He hit .362 with 58 doubles and 24 home runs over three seasons and was a three-time All-Missouri Valley Conference selection.

Gillaspie played in the Cape Cod Baseball League (CCBL) during the summer of 2007, leading the league in hitting with a .345 batting average. He led the Falmouth Commodores to the championship series against the Yarmouth-Dennis Red Sox, but could not play in the series as he had to return to school. He was named league MVP, and is a member of the CCBL Hall of Fame class of 2019.

== Professional career ==
=== San Francisco Giants ===
Gillaspie was drafted by the San Francisco Giants 37th overall in the 2008 Major League Baseball draft. He played only 24 games in the minors before being called up to the majors on September 6, 2008. He got his first major league hit off Dan Haren on September 16, 2008.

He was the first player in his draft class to make his MLB debut.

Gillaspie spent 2009 at Single-A San Jose and 2010 in Double-A Richmond. He started the 2011 season with Triple-A Fresno. On June 5, 2011, Gillaspie was recalled to the major leagues when Brandon Belt was placed on the 15-day disabled list. On September 27, 2011, Gillaspie hit an inside-the-park home run against Colorado Rockies pitcher Esmil Rogers for his first Major League home run.

Gillaspie began 2012 with Triple-A Fresno, hitting .362 with 3 HR and 13 RBI in 23 games before being recalled to San Francisco when Pablo Sandoval was placed on the 15-day DL. He got his first hit (a single) of the 2012 season on June 10 against the Texas Rangers.

=== Chicago White Sox ===
On February 22, 2013, the San Francisco Giants traded Gillaspie to the Chicago White Sox for minor-league pitcher Jeff Soptic. He became the White Sox primary third baseman in 2013 and 2014. He hit .245 with 13 home runs in 134 games in 2013 and .282 with 7 home runs and 57 RBIs in 130 games in 2014. He was hitting .325 as of July 26, but hit only .209 for the rest of the season. He struggled in 2015 and was designated for assignment on July 19, 2015.

=== Los Angeles Angels ===
The White Sox traded Gillaspie to the Los Angeles Angels of Anaheim for cash considerations on July 24, 2015. He was designated for assignment on August 18.

=== Second stint with the Giants ===
In February 2016, the San Francisco Giants signed Gillaspie to a minor league deal with an invitation to spring training. He started the season with the Giants' Triple-A affiliate, the Sacramento River Cats of the Pacific Coast League. He was called up on April 22, and spent the season mainly as a bench player for the Giants, but played a big role in the final week of the season, hitting .500 (7 for 14) while replacing an injured Eduardo Nunez.

On October 5, Gillaspie hit a three-run homer in the top of the ninth inning of the 2016 National League Wild Card Game off Jeurys Familia to break a 0–0 tie, helping the Giants defeat the New York Mets 3–0

Gillaspie was designated for assignment on August 3, 2017. On August 6, he cleared waivers and returned to the organization to play for the Giants' Triple-A affiliate Sacramento River Cats. He elected free agency on October 2.

== Personal ==
Gillaspie and his wife Amanda have three children. Gillaspie's brother, Casey Gillaspie, was drafted in the first round of the 2014 MLB draft by the Tampa Bay Rays, played for several minor league teams in the MILB and then independent leagues, retiring in April 2023.
