= Kelby Tomlinson =

American baseball player (born 1990)

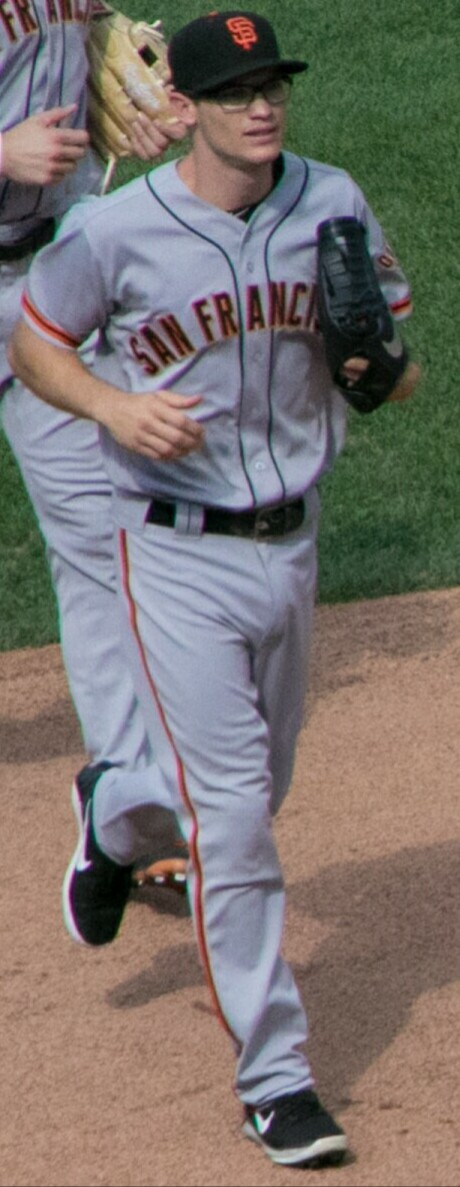
- Tomlinson with the San Francisco Giants
- Utility player
- Born: June 16, 1990 (age 36); Chickasha, Oklahoma, U.S.
- Batted: Right Threw: Right

MLB debut
- August 3, 2015, for the San Francisco Giants

Last MLB appearance
- September 30, 2018, for the San Francisco Giants

MLB statistics
- Batting average: .265
- Home runs: 3
- Runs batted in: 47
- Stats at Baseball Reference

Teams
- San Francisco Giants (2015–2018)

Kelby Aaron Tomlinson (born June 16, 1990) is an American former professional baseball utility player. He played college baseball at Texas Tech and played in Major League Baseball (MLB) for the San Francisco Giants, by whom he was drafted in 2011. He is 6 feet 3 inches (1.91 m) tall and weighs 180 pounds (82 kg). He bats and throws right-handed.

== Early career ==
Born in Chickasha, Oklahoma, Tomlinson attended Elgin High School in Elgin, Oklahoma. Tomlinson played college baseball for two seasons at Seward County Community College (2009–10) and one season at Texas Tech (2011). He was drafted by the San Francisco Giants in the 12th round (387th overall) of the 2011 MLB draft.

== Professional career ==
=== San Francisco Giants ===
==== Minor leagues ====
In 2011, Tomlinson began his professional baseball career playing for the Augusta GreenJackets of the Single–A South Atlantic League, hitting .356 in 149 at bats. In 2012, Tomlinson finished the year with a .224 average in 450 at-bats. In 2013, Tomlinson started the year with the Arizona League Giants of the Arizona Fall League. He was then promoted to the San Jose Giants of the California League at the High–A level, where he had a .276 average in 134 at-bats. Tomlinson was then called up to play for the Richmond Flying Squirrels of the Double–A Eastern League. He struggled, managing only a .198 average in 96 at bats. In 2014, Tomlinson became the starting second baseman for the Richmond Flying Squirrels. He eventually finished the year with a .268 average in 433 at bats, playing in 126 games.

In 2015, Tomlinson continued to play for the Richmond. He was eventually promoted to play for the Sacramento River Cats of the Pacific Coast League, at the Triple–A level. after hitting .324 in 253 at bats for the Flying Squirrels. He managed a .316 average in 136 at-bats before being called up the Major Leagues, to play for the San Francisco Giants.

In his minor league career, Tomlinson played in 457 games and recorded 1679 at bats. He scored 253 runs and 459 hits. Tomlinson hit eight home runs and had 160 runs batted in. He was walked 175 times and struck out 336 times. Tomlinson also stole 126 bases. In the minors, Tomlinson recorded an average of .273 and an on-base percentage of .345.

==== Major leagues ====
Tomlinson was called up to the San Francisco Giants on August 3, 2015, to replace the injured Joe Panik. Tomlinson also made his debut that day, hitting a single and scoring a run in the 12th inning of a game against the Atlanta Braves. He started his first major league game on August 5, driving in three runs in his first two at-bats. Tomlinson became the first Giant to hit safely in his first three at-bats since Fred Lewis in 2006. On August 27, Tomlinson hit a grand slam off James Russell of the Chicago Cubs for his first major league home run. The next day, he got his first walk-off hit: a single against a drawn-in five-man infield in a 5–4 win against the St. Louis Cardinals. On October 3 at AT&T Park, in a 3–2 win over the Colorado Rockies, Tomlinson hit an inside-the-park home run off Chris Rusin. During his rookie season with the Giants, Tomlinson made 46 starts at second base and played in 54 games. He batted .303 while driving in 20 runs.

Following the 2015 season, in an effort to add to his versatility, he began training as an outfielder in the instructional league. Tomlinson made the Giants 25-man roster in 2016 as a backup infielder. During the 2016 season, Tomlinson made starts at second base, shortstop, third base and left field for the Giants while playing in 52 games and having a .292 batting average.

During the 2017 season he appeared in 104 games with 38 starts for the Giants.

During the 2018 season he appeared in 63 games with 19 starts for the Giants. He was removed from the 40–man roster and outrighted to Triple-A on October 22, 2018. Tomlinson elected free agency following the season on November 2, 2018.

=== Arizona Diamondbacks ===
On November 20, 2018, Tomlinson signed a minor-league deal with the Arizona Diamondbacks. He was released on May 12, 2019 after playing in 30 games for the Triple-A Reno Aces.

=== Seattle Mariners ===
On May 31, 2019, Tomlinson signed a minor league contract with the Seattle Mariners organization. In 69 games for the Triple–A Tacoma Rainiers, he slashed .250/.293/.311 with no home runs and 11 RBI. Tomlinson elected free agency following the season on November 4.

=== Colorado Rockies ===
On January 21, 2020, Tomlinson signed a minor league deal with the Colorado Rockies. He was released on June 27. On June 1, 2021, Tomlinson re-signed with the Rockies organization on a new minor league contract. He was assigned to the Triple-A Albuquerque Isotopes and went 3-for-16 in 8 games for the team. On July 8, Tomlinson retired from professional baseball.

== Post-playing career ==
Tomlinson became a certified optician and with his wife, Tiffany, opened an eyewear shop called Squints in Liberal, Kansas in 2020.

Tomlinson was drafted by the Loco Beach Coconuts in the Banana Ball Player Draft on October 28th, 2026.
