= Mac Williamson =

American baseball player (born 1990)

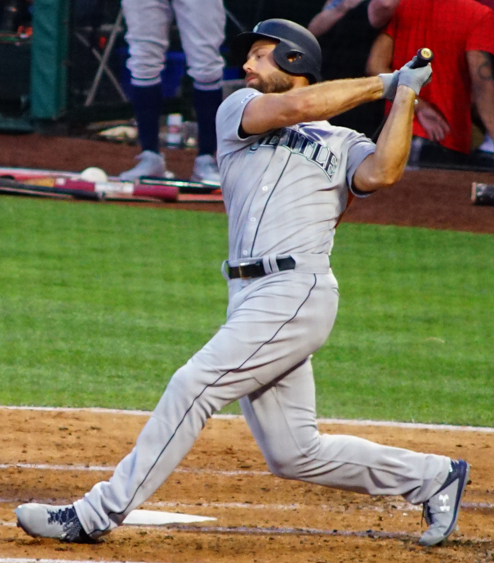
- Williamson with the Seattle Mariners in 2019
- Left Fielder
- Born: July 15, 1990 (age 36); Jacksonville, Florida, U.S.
- Batted: Right Threw: Right

Professional debut
- MLB: September 23, 2015, for the San Francisco Giants
- KBO: July 27, 2019, for the Samsung Lions

Last appearance
- MLB: July 14, 2019, for the Seattle Mariners
- KBO: September 29, 2019, for the Samsung Lions

MLB statistics
- Batting average: .203
- Home runs: 17
- Runs batted in: 50

KBO statistics
- Batting average: .273
- Home runs: 4
- Runs batted in: 15
- Stats at Baseball Reference

Teams
- San Francisco Giants (2015–2019); Seattle Mariners (2019); Samsung Lions (2019)
Medals
Men's baseball
Representing United States
Pan American Games
Silver medal – second place	2015 Toronto	Team

Johnathan Mackensey Williamson (born July 15, 1990) is an American former professional baseball outfielder. He played in the Major League Baseball (MLB) for the San Francisco Giants and Seattle Mariners, and in the KBO League for the Samsung Lions. Williamson played college baseball at Wake Forest University.

== Career ==
Williamson attended Wake Forest-Rolesville High School in Wake Forest, North Carolina. He played for the school's baseball team as a pitcher, and was rated the best pitching prospect in the state of North Carolina. He chose to enroll at Wake Forest University to play college baseball for the Wake Forest Demon Deacons. He redshirted as a freshman, and played for Wake Forest as an outfielder. The Boston Red Sox chose Williamson in the 46th round of the 2011 MLB draft, but he decided to return to Wake Forest for his senior year.

=== San Francisco Giants ===
In the 2012 MLB draft, the San Francisco Giants selected Williamson in the third round, with the 115th overall selection. He signed with the Giants, beginning his professional career in the Rookie-level Arizona League, hitting two home runs in 19 plate appearances. The Giants then promoted Williamson to the Salem-Keizer Volcanoes of the Class A-Short Season Northwest League, where he hit seven home runs in 125 plate appearances.

In 2013, the Giants assigned Williamson to the San Jose Giants of the Class A-Advanced California League. He hit 25 home runs for San Jose.

In 2014, he was invited to his first spring training. Though the Giants wanted to assign Williamson to the Richmond Flying Squirrels of the Class AA Eastern League to start the 2014 season, an elbow injury led them to keep him in San Jose, where he could still play as a designated hitter. After beginning the season with a .318 batting average and three home runs, Williamson went on the disabled list with a torn ulnar collateral ligament of the elbow and had Tommy John surgery, ending his 2014 season. Williamson would go on to fully recover from the surgery without complication.

In 2015, he began the season with Richmond and the Giants promoted him to the Sacramento River Cats of the Class AAA Pacific Coast League in June. The Giants promoted Williamson to MLB on September 16, 2015. He made his MLB debut with the Giants on September 23. He made his first MLB start in right field on September 25, 2015, and got his first MLB hit off Sonny Gray of the Oakland Athletics.

In 2016, Williamson began the season with Sacramento, and received a promotion to the major leagues on April 15, but was sent back to the minors a week later. On June 2, Williamson was called up after Hunter Pence suffered an injury. On June 8, 2016, Williamson hit his first major league home run off David Price of the Boston Red Sox, a tie-breaking shot in the bottom of the eighth inning.

During 2017 spring training, Williamson was in competition for the left field job, competing against other outfielders. He suffered a minor injury towards the end of spring training, which would cause him to miss opening day. Williamson was ping-ponged back and forth between the MLB and triple-A throughout the 2017 season and began to make large contributions to the team near the season's end, including a 3 for 3 performance with a monstrous home run against Clayton Kershaw on September 24, 2017.

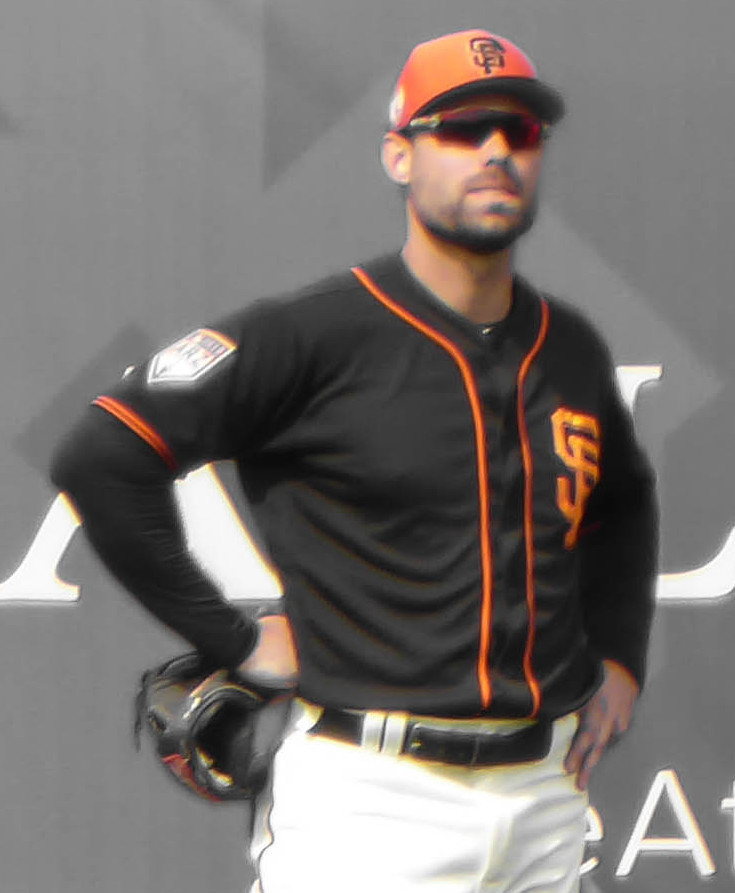
Williamson with the Giants during spring training in 2019

On March 28, 2019, Williamson was designated for assignment, after failing to make the Opening Day roster. On April 4, 2019, Williamson cleared waivers and was outrighted to Triple-A. On June 1, 2019, Williamson elected to become a free agent after clearing waivers a second time in 2019.

=== Seattle Mariners ===
On June 5, 2019, Williamson signed a minor league contract with the Seattle Mariners; the Mariners immediately selected his contract after the signing. In his first plate appearance with the Mariners, Williamson hit a three-run home run. In 25 appearances for Seattle, he batted .182/.276/.299 with three home runs and 10 RBI. On July 16, Williamson was designated for assignment by Seattle following the promotion of Kristopher Negrón. He cleared waivers and was sent outright to the Triple-A Tacoma Rainiers on July 17. Williamson left the team on July 23, in order to pursue an opportunity in Korea.

=== Samsung Lions ===
On July 25, 2019, Williamson officially signed a $275,000 contract with the Samsung Lions of the KBO League. In 40 appearances for Samsung, Williamson batted .273/.327/.409 with four home runs and 15 RBI. He became a free agent following the season.

=== Washington Nationals ===
On January 15, 2020, Williamson signed a minor league contract with the Washington Nationals. He did not play in a game in 2020 due to the cancellation of the minor league season because of the COVID-19 pandemic. Williamson was released by the Nationals organization on May 29.

== Personal life ==
Williamson was born in Jacksonville, Florida, on July 15, 1990. He grew up in Wake Forest, North Carolina, with his three brothers, Renn, Cameron, and Christian.

In November 2020, Williamson filed a personal injury lawsuit against China Basin Ballpark Company LLC, which owns and operates Oracle Park, after tripping on the ballpark's on-field warm-up mound, hitting his head against a wall and suffering a concussion while trying to catch a fly ball hit in April 2018, which was hit by Bryce Harper. Williamson claimed that he was still suffering from symptoms including nausea and dizziness which effectively ended his career. The on-field mounds were removed the following season.
