= Ángel Pagán =

Puerto Rican baseball player (born 1981)

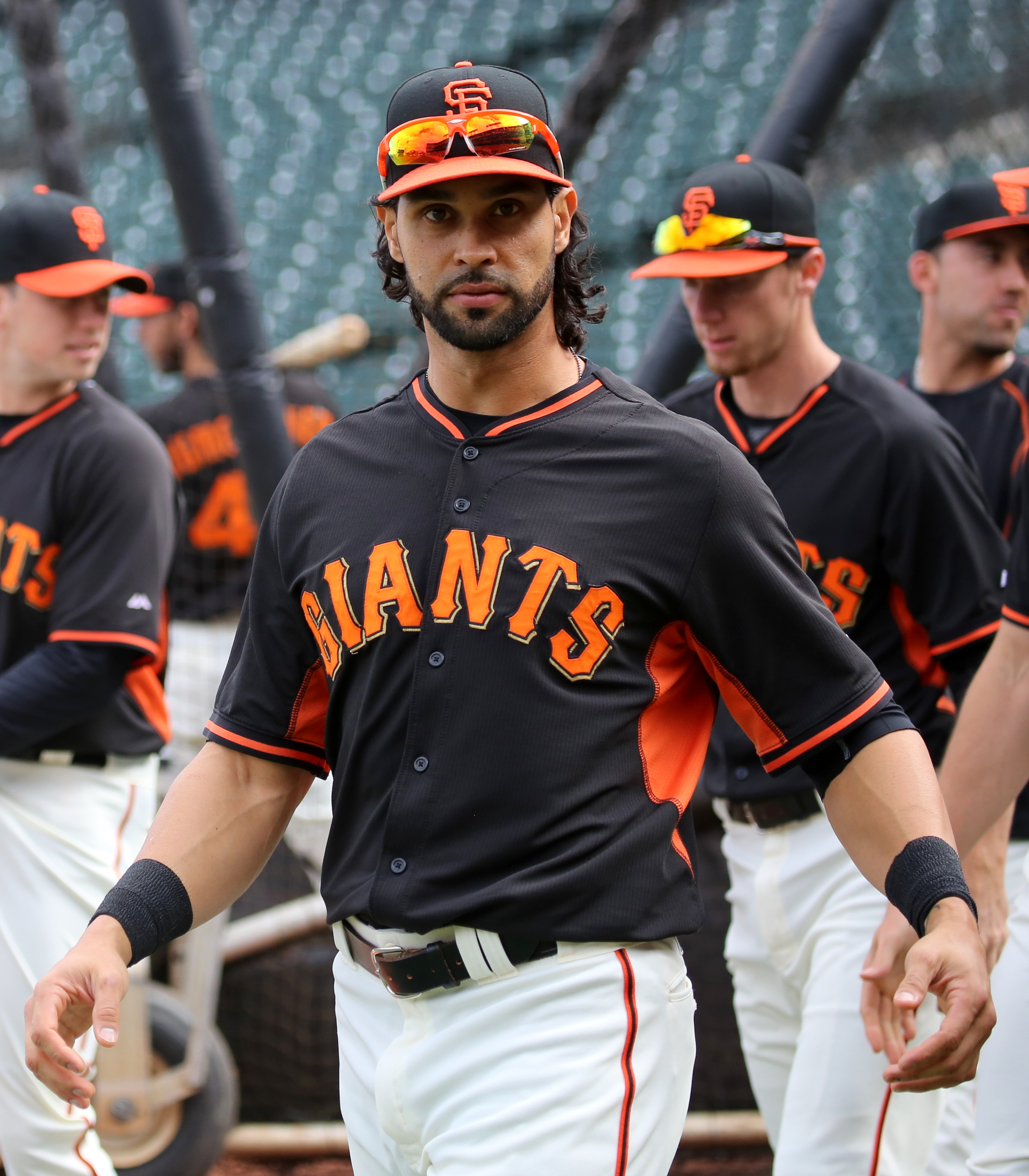
- Pagán with the San Francisco Giants in 2015
- Outfielder
- Born: July 2, 1981 (age 45); Río Piedras, Puerto Rico
- Batted: Switch Threw: Right

MLB debut
- April 3, 2006, for the Chicago Cubs

Last MLB appearance
- October 2, 2016, for the San Francisco Giants

MLB statistics
- Batting average: .280
- Home runs: 64
- Runs batted in: 414
- Stats at Baseball Reference

Teams
- Chicago Cubs (2006–2007); New York Mets (2008–2011); San Francisco Giants (2012–2016)

Career highlights and awards
- World Series champion (2012)
Medals
Men's baseball
Representing Puerto Rico
World Baseball Classic
Silver medal – second place	2013 San Francisco	Team
Silver medal – second place	2017 Los Angeles	Team

Ángel Manuel Pagán (born July 2, 1981) is a Puerto Rican former professional baseball outfielder. He played in Major League Baseball (MLB) for the Chicago Cubs, New York Mets, and San Francisco Giants.

Pagán's original contract in Major League Baseball (MLB) was with the New York Mets, but he was transferred to the Chicago Cubs when they bought his contract. Pagán was traded back to the Mets prior to the 2008 season. In December 2011, he was traded to the San Francisco Giants for Andrés Torres and Ramón Ramírez. While primarily a center fielder throughout his career, Pagan transitioned to left field in 2016.

== Early life ==
Ángel Manuel Pagán was born and raised in Río Piedras, Puerto Rico. His mother, Gloria, was a fan of baseball and played in a men's fastpitch softball league. The family lived in a crowded apartment with his brother and sister, and the energetic Pagán did not have space to run. His mother hoped to direct Pagán's high level of energy into a constructive outlet, and encouraged the child to play the sport. He joined a tee ball team at age six, and continued playing throughout childhood. Baseball helped him avoid the dangers of his neighborhood; he recalls, "It was tough to come out of that place a good person. Selling drugs or something. It was a bad neighborhood. A lot of my friends couldn't survive that world. But [my mother] made me strong enough to forget about that path and go to the positive one." He also developed interests in basketball and boxing, "But there was something about baseball", he said. "I fell in love with the sport." Pagán was given the nickname "El Caballo Loco" (Spanish for "Crazy Horse") by his teammates during his early years as player for Las Lomas Potros in Rio Piedras, Puerto Rico manage by Willie Ronda.

The New York Mets showed early interest, making him their fourth round pick in the 1999 Major League Baseball draft.

== College career ==
After initially failing to come to terms, Pagan played ball at Indian River State College in Florida.

== Professional career ==
=== Minors ===
Pagan eventually came to terms with the Mets the day before they would have lost signing rights. He spent five seasons in the Mets farm system before the Chicago Cubs acquired him.

=== Chicago Cubs (2006–2007) ===
==== 2006 ====
On January 25, 2006, the Cubs purchased Pagán's contract from the Mets. Pagán made his major league debut with the Cubs on April 3, 2006, but was injured early in the season and missed two and a half months. On July 2, 2006, his 25th birthday, Pagán hit his first and second career home runs in a game against the crosstown rival Chicago White Sox. Pagán was the first person in Major League history to hit his first two career home runs on his birthday. (The second person was Stephen Cardullo in 2016.)

==== 2007 ====
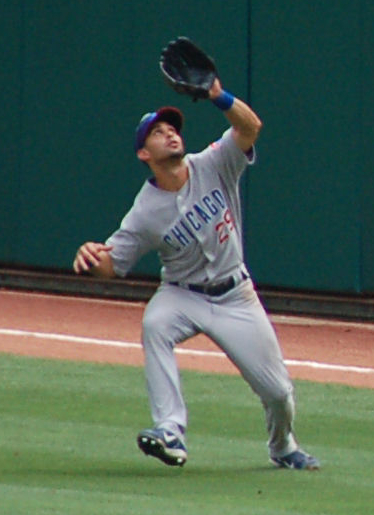
Pagán playing for the Chicago Cubs in 2007

Pagán returned in May 2007, being recalled in place of Matt Murton, who had struggled somewhat and was not getting regular at-bats. Pagán then became a regular outfielder and enjoyed modest success until his season was cut short due to a bout with colitis. On June 2, 2007, Pagán was called out at third base trying to move up after a wild pitch, which led to Lou Piniella's most infamous meltdown.

Pagán had lost a considerable amount of weight and strength due to illness. Chicago general manager Jim Hendry was afraid Pagán would not be ready to start the 2008 season on time, thus prompting the trade to New York.

=== New York Mets (2008–2011) ===
==== 2008 ====
On January 5, 2008, Pagán returned to the Mets in a trade for two minor-league players. He began the year as the starting left fielder for the Mets because Moisés Alou was injured and on the disabled list. When Alou returned from the DL in May, he took over the starting job in left field from Pagán.

On May 7, 2008, Pagán made a spectacular catch in foul territory, falling into the stands, in Los Angeles against the Dodgers while playing left field. Although he originally stayed in the game, Pagán was later removed with left shoulder pain. The injury eventually caused Pagán to be placed on the disabled list. Pagán was undergoing rehabilitation in the GCL and was expected to be on the active roster after the All-Star break. However, he left a rehab start with the Brooklyn Cyclones feeling pain when batting from the right side. Pagán had season-ending surgery on his shoulder on July 29, 2008.

==== 2009 ====
On June 1, 2009, Pagán was placed on the 15-Day DL with a right groin strain. The next day, the Mets activated 2B Alex Cora to fill Pagán's spot on the roster. On August 1, 2009, Pagán hit a grand slam for his first home run since mid-2007 and first for the New York Mets, leading to the win over the Arizona Diamondbacks. On August 5, 2009, he went 3-for-4 against the Cardinals, with a home run, triple, and single, missing the cycle by just a double. On August 23, 2009, he hit 2 home runs (one of which was inside the park) against Pedro Martínez and the Philadelphia Phillies.

On October 4, 2009, Pagán went four-for-four against the Houston Astros, falling a home run shy of a cycle.

==== 2010 ====
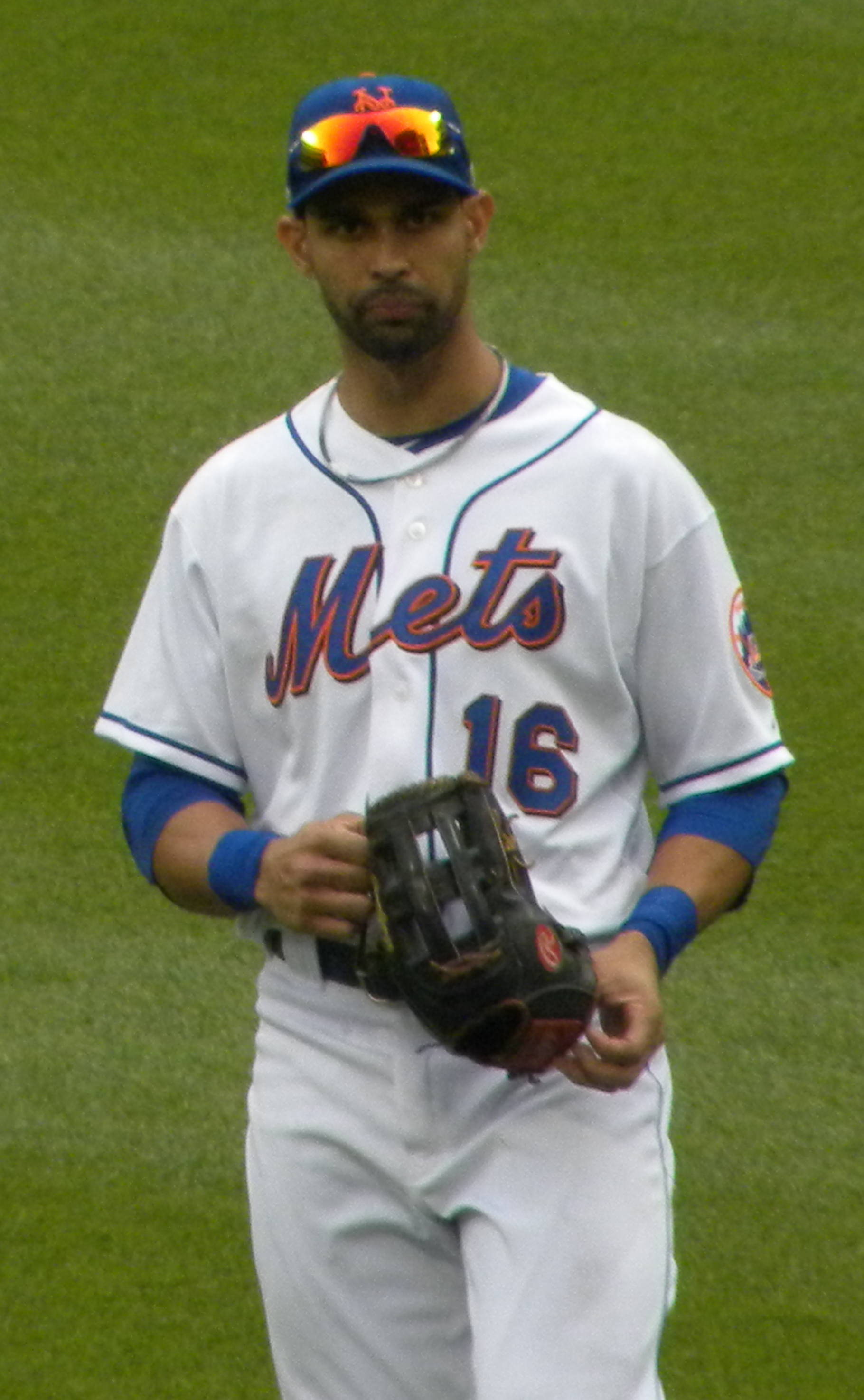
Pagán during his tenure with the New York Mets in 2010

Pagán was not the 2010 Opening Day center fielder (the nod went to newly acquired Gary Matthews, Jr.), despite making a strong case in 2009. Due to Matthew's poor performance, Pagán shortly found himself back in the starting lineup and quickly established himself as a quality everyday player.

On May 19, 2010, Pagán became the second player in MLB history to hit an inside the park home run and turn a triple play in the same game. The triple play started in the 5th inning against the Washington Nationals on a ball hit by Cristian Guzmán. After catching the bloop hit, his momentum carried him right into the infield and he threw the ball in. Since the baserunners each advanced a base, had Pagan opted to run the ball in himself, he could have recorded an unassisted triple play and would have been the first ever outfielder to do so. The inside the park home run was also the first in Nationals Park history. On June 22. 2010, Pagán fell one home run short of a cycle.

With the return of Carlos Beltrán as the starting center fielder on July 15, 2010, Pagán became the starting right fielder for the Mets, replacing Jeff Francoeur. He finished the year batting .290, with 11 home runs and 69 RBI. He had 168 base hits in 579 at bats on the season. He hit 31 doubles, 7 triples and stole 37 bases. His first career hit by a pitch came on September 4, 2010, against the Chicago Cubs. All facets of Pagán's game improved in 2010, most notably his ability to make smart decisions while running the bases.

==== 2011 ====
With the uncertainty of Beltran's health as well as his range, the speedy Pagán was inserted into the starting center fielder position for the 2011 season. Beltran was moved over to right field by manager Terry Collins.

He was placed on the DL on April 21, 2011, due to a rib injury. On May 27, 2011, he came back from the DL as the club sent down Fernando Martínez and DFA'd Pat Misch and they brought up Dale Thayer. For the season, on defense, he led all major league center fielders in errors, with 10, and had the lowest fielding percentage, at .968. On July 20, Pagán hit a 10th-inning walk-off home run off the railing of the second deck (named the Pepsi Porch in Citi Field) against closer Fernando Salas to help the Mets win 6-5 over the St. Louis Cardinals.

=== San Francisco Giants (2012–2016) ===
==== 2012 ====
On December 7, 2011, Pagán was traded to the San Francisco Giants for Andrés Torres and Ramón Ramírez.

On January 16, 2012, Pagán signed a one-year deal with the San Francisco Giants worth $4.85 million to avoid his final year of arbitration. His deal included incentives of an additional $50,000 for 550, 600 and 650 plate appearances. With 659 plate appearances in 2012, Pagán earned a salary of $5 million that year.

Pagán set the Giants record for a home hitting streak at 28 games. This broke Mike Donlin's record of 26 consecutive home games with at least one hit from 1905 to 1906, back when the team was in New York. On September 15, 2012, Pagán broke the San Francisco Giants record for the most triples in a season, with 13. He finished the regular season with 15 triples, which led the major leagues. In 2012, Pagán was vital to the Giants reaching the 2012 World Series and was the lead-off hitter for the Giants throughout most of the postseason.

On December 3, Pagán signed a 4-year, $40 million contract with San Francisco, pending a physical examination. The contract became official on December 7, 2012.

==== 2013 ====
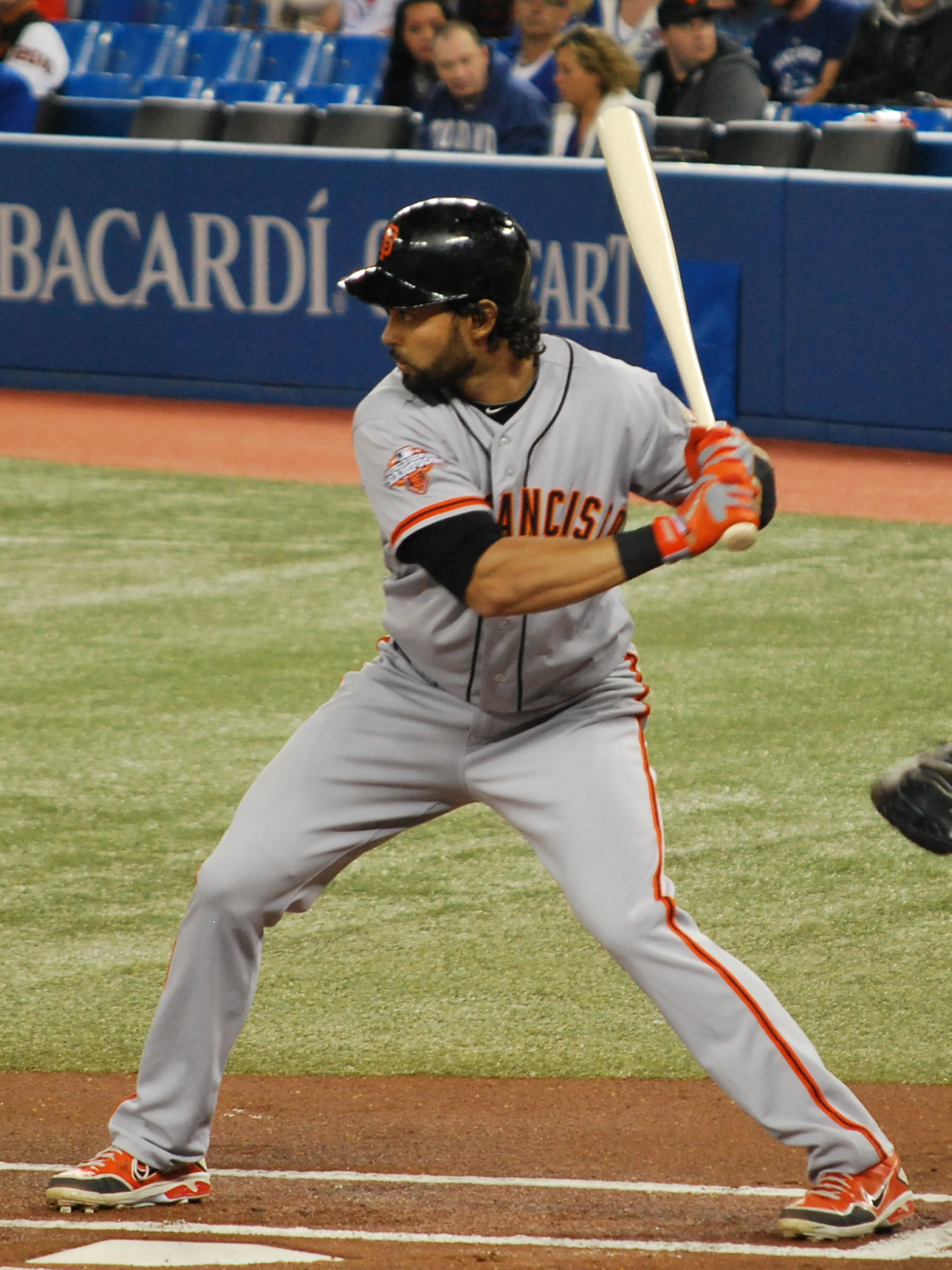
Pagán batting for the San Francisco Giants in 2013

On May 25, with the Giants trailing 5-4 in the bottom of the tenth inning versus the Colorado Rockies, Pagán hit a walk-off inside-the-park home run off of reliever Rafael Betancourt. It was the third inside-the-park home run of Pagán's career. However, Pagán injured his left hamstring during the game and was placed on the 15-day disabled list, effective May 28.

On June 20, Pagán re-injured his left hamstring while on rehab assignment with the Class-A Advanced San Jose Giants against the Stockton Ports. On June 25, he underwent surgery to repair a torn tendon in his left hamstring, and he did not join the Giants again until August 30, missing 82 games.

Pagán finished the season batting .282/.334/.414 in 71 games with 5 home runs and 30 RBIs.

==== 2014 ====
Pagán hit .300/.342/.389 in 96 games for the Giants in 2014. He missed 44 games from June 15 to August 7 with back inflammation. On September 25, Pagán underwent season-ending surgery to repair a bulging disk and inflamed nerve in his back. While on the disabled list the Giants won the World Series. He was given a World Series ring despite the premature end to his season.

==== 2015 ====
In 2015, Pagán hit .262/.303/.332 with 27 extra-base hits in 133 games, notching a career-low .635 OPS. Dealing with knee problems all season, Pagán was placed on the disabled list in August with right patella tendinitis. After the season, Pagán underwent arthroscopic surgery on his right knee.

==== 2016 ====
After three injury-riddled seasons and advanced metrics that suggested worsening defense, the Giants moved Pagán to left field to make way for Denard Span. Pagán had not played left field since 2010, but accepted the transition, leading the team in batting average at .315 in April. A strained left hamstring kept Pagán out for thirty games, but he recovered by batting .350 for the month of June. He would go hitless in his first 10 July at-bats before his fourth home run of the season on Independence Day, already topping his totals from each of the prior two seasons. Pagán finished the season with a .277 batting average and a career-high 12 home runs in 495 at-bats, while seeing the highest percentage of fastballs of all MLB hitters (66.7%).

=== Free agency (2017) ===
On April 19, 2017, while a free agent, Pagan announced that he would not be playing for the 2017 season, stating that he had dissatisfaction with contract offers and wanted to spend some time with his family. However, he did not say that he was going to retire.

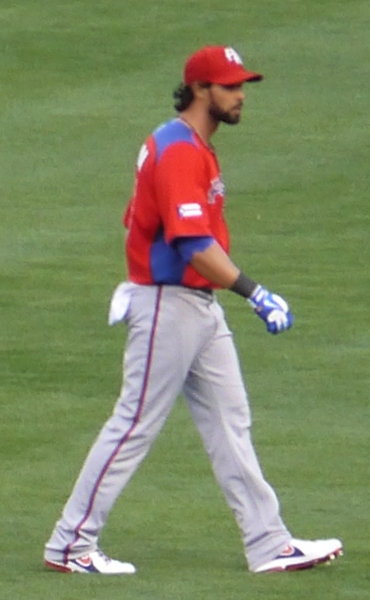
Pagán with the Puerto Rico national team in the 2013 World Baseball Classic

== International career ==
Pagán was part of the Puerto Rican team during their silver medal run of the 2013 World Baseball Classic. He led the team to the Finals, where they lost against Dominican Republic. Pagán finished the tournament with a batting average of .364 (12-for-33) to lead his team. Following the conclusion of the tournament, Pagán was named to the 2013 All-World Baseball Classic team.

Pagán also played for Team Puerto Rico during their silver medal run in the 2017 World Baseball Classic. He played left field defensively and batted 1st in the lineup.

== Personal life ==
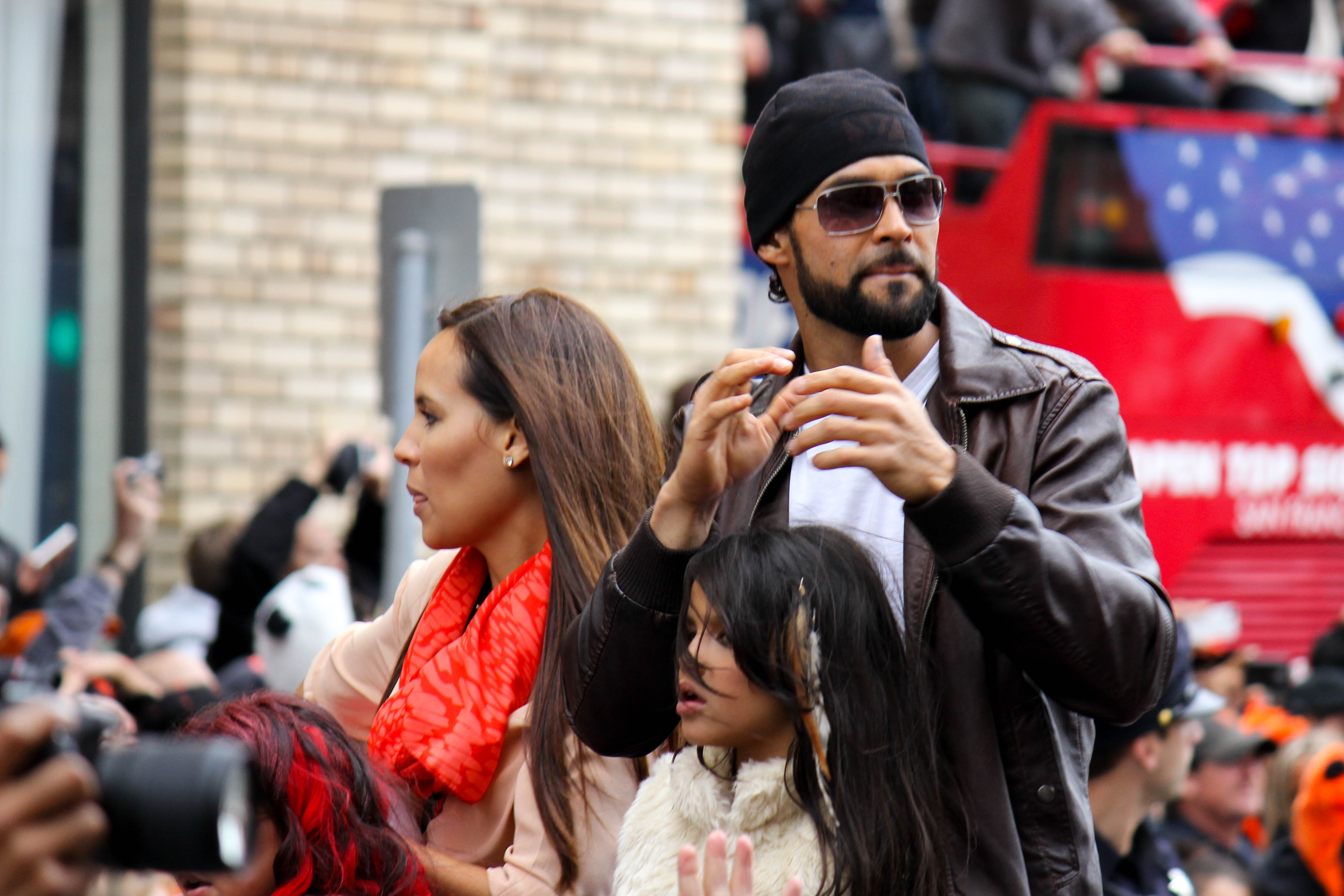
Pagán with his family at the 2012 World Series victory parade

Pagán has three daughters: Briana, Suil Angelina, and Larah. Angel separated from his ex-wife in 2022 and finalized his divorce in 2023. He is currently engaged to Stephanie Ann Larette, whom he met in 2023 and who was previously in a relationship with a Puerto Rican singer.

On May 7, 2009, Pagán was arrested in Port St. Lucie, Florida for traffic violations. It was reported that Pagán, who was driving with a suspended license, was originally stopped for speeding, but after a license check, troopers learned Pagán has several warrants out for his arrest for failure to pay traffic fines.

In May 2019, Pagán was rescued out at sea near Cibuco Beach in Vega Alta, Puerto Rico, when the boat he and fellow professional baseball player Orlando Román were in capsized.
