= 2016 American League Wild Card Game =

	1	2	3	4	5	6	7	8	9	10	11	R	H	E
Baltimore Orioles	0	0	0	2	0	0	0	0	0	0	0	2	4	0
Toronto Blue Jays	0	1	0	0	1	0	0	0	0	0	3	5	9	0
- Date: October 4, 2016
- Venue: Rogers Centre
- City: Toronto, Ontario
- Managers: Buck Showalter (Baltimore Orioles); John Gibbons (Toronto Blue Jays)
- Umpires: Ted Barrett, Gary Cederstrom (crew chief), Eric Cooper, Will Little, David Rackley and Bill Welke; Replay: Scott Barry and Mark Carlson.
- Attendance: 49,934
- Ceremonial first pitch: Roberto Alomar
- Television: Canada: Sportsnet; United States: TBS
- TV announcers: Ernie Johnson Jr., Ron Darling, Cal Ripken Jr., and Sam Ryan
- Radio: Canada: Sportsnet; United States: ESPN
- Radio announcers: Jon Sciambi and Chris Singleton

The 2016 American League Wild Card Game was a play-in game during Major League Baseball's (MLB) 2016 postseason played between the American League's (AL) two wild card teams, the Toronto Blue Jays and the Baltimore Orioles. As both teams finished with identical 89–73 records, a tiebreaker was used to determine the host team. In accordance with MLB tiebreaking rules, the Blue Jays earned the right to host the game by winning their season series against the Orioles 10–9.

The Blue Jays beat the Orioles, 5–2, in extra innings. This was the Orioles' last postseason appearance until 2023.

== Background ==
This was Toronto's first appearance in the Wild Card Game and their first overall appearance as a wild card (when it was first introduced in 1995), and their second consecutive postseason appearance after winning the AL East Division the previous season. It was the second appearance in a Wild Card Game both for Baltimore and its manager Buck Showalter. Showalter's Orioles defeated the Texas Rangers in the inaugural AL Wild Card Game in 2012. This was the first postseason meeting between the two teams.

The game was played at 8:00 pm EDT on October 4, 2016, at Rogers Centre in Toronto, with the winner advancing to play the first-seeded Texas Rangers in the Division Series. It was televised in the United States on TBS, while Sportsnet, a property of Blue Jays owner Rogers Communications, simulcast the TBS production in Canada.

The retractable dome at Rogers Centre was open for the game, the first time this was done for a postseason contest at the venue.

This was the second Wild Card Game played between teams with identical regular season records, and the second time for the Baltimore Orioles. Under the 1995-2011 playoff format, the teams would have played a one-game playoff to determine the Wild Card team.

== Game results ==
=== Line score ===
October 4, 2016 8:08 pm (EDT) at Rogers Centre in Toronto, Ontario 17 °C (63 °F), clear
Team	1	2	3	4	5	6	7	8	9	10	11	R	H	E
Baltimore	0	0	0	2	0	0	0	0	0	0	0	2	4	0
Toronto	0	1	0	0	1	0	0	0	0	0	3	5	9	0
WP: Francisco Liriano (1–0) LP: Ubaldo Jiménez (0–1); Home runs: BAL: Mark Trumbo (1); TOR: José Bautista (1), Edwin Encarnación (1); Attendance: 49,934; Boxscore

External videos
- American League Wild Card Game Full replay on the MLB's official YouTube channel

Toronto and Baltimore turned to their Opening Day starters, as Marcus Stroman and Chris Tillman took the mound for their respective teams.

The Blue Jays scored first with a home run by José Bautista leading off the second inning. The Orioles responded two innings later with a go-ahead two-run homer from Mark Trumbo. The Blue Jays recorded three hits in the fifth on their way to scoring the tying run.

The Toronto Blue Jays won the game 5–2 in the 11th inning when Edwin Encarnación hit a walk-off three-run homer off Ubaldo Jiménez. Zach Britton, the Orioles' closer and 2016 American League Reliever of the Year, controversially did not appear in the game, as Orioles manager Buck Showalter elected to pitch Ubaldo Jimenez; Showalter later indicated he was waiting for the Orioles to take the lead and use Britton to close out the game. The Blue Jays advanced to the American League Division Series to face the Rangers for the second consecutive time in the postseason; their first meeting was in the previous year's American League Division Series.

Encarnación became only the fourth player to end a winner-take-all postseason game (that is, a game in which one team or the other was sure to be eliminated) with a walk-off home run, joining Bill Mazeroski (1960 World Series), Chris Chambliss (1976 ALCS) and Aaron Boone (2003 ALCS).
