= David Rackley =

American baseball umpire (born 1981)

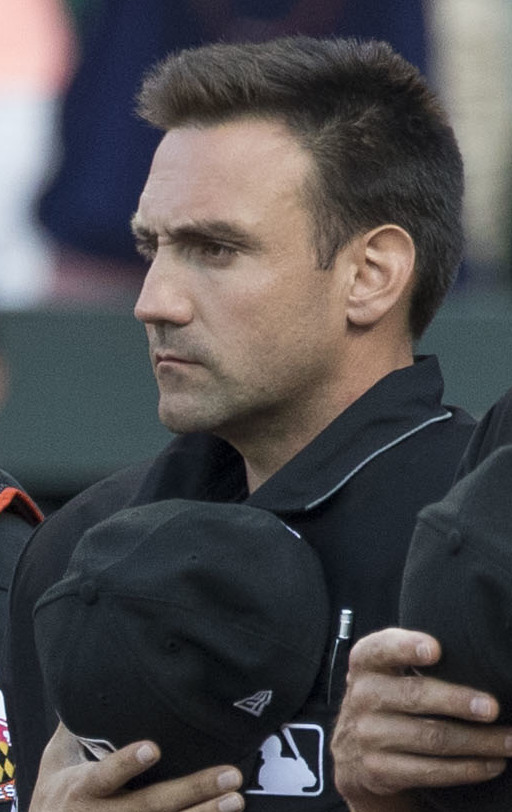
- Rackley in 2017

MLB – No. 86
- Umpire
- Born: October 11, 1981 (age 45); Houston, Texas, U.S.

MLB debut
- August 13, 2010

Crew information
- Umpiring crew: N
- Crew members: #68 Chris Guccione (crew chief); #86 David Rackley; #33 Nestor Ceja; #50 Charlie Ramos

Career highlights and awards
- Special assignments: World Series (2023); League Championship Series (2021, 2024, 2026); Division Series (2020, 2022, 2023); Wild Card Games/Series (2016, 2017, 2019, 2020, 2024, 2025); All-Star Games (2021); Fort Bragg Game (2016); World Baseball Classic (2026)

David Ross Rackley (born October 11, 1981) is an American Major League Baseball umpire. He made his Major League umpiring debut on August 13, 2010. He wears uniform number 86.

== Career ==
Before reaching the Major Leagues, Rackley umpired in the Arizona, Northwest, South Atlantic, California, Texas, International, Florida Instructional, and Arizona Instructional leagues. Rackley also umpired the 2007 All-Star Futures Game, and is an instructor at the Harry Wendelstedt Umpire School.

He was hired to the full-time MLB staff prior to the 2014 season and worked his first postseason during the 2016 American League Wild Card Game.

== See also ==
- List of Major League Baseball umpires (disambiguation)
