= Nestor Ceja =

Mexican-American baseball umpire (born 1987)

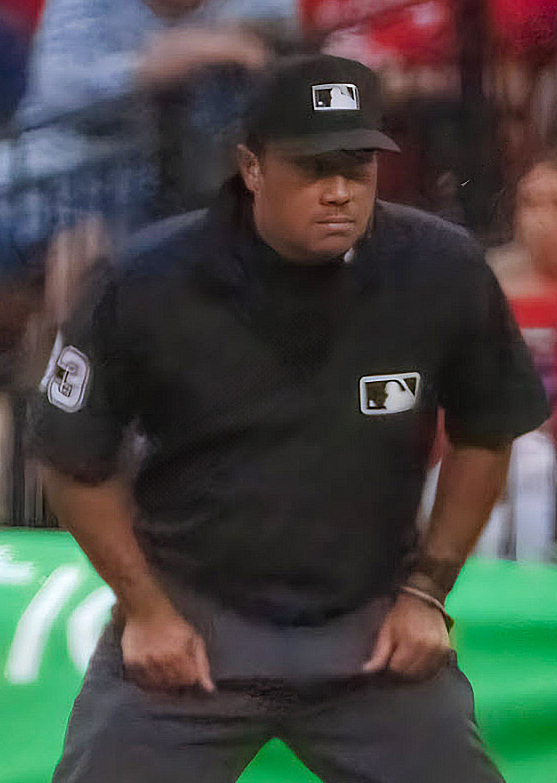
- Ceja in 2024

MLB – No. 33
- Umpire
- Born: April 18, 1987 (age 39); Michoacán, Mexico

MLB debut
- August 14, 2020

Crew information
- Umpiring crew: N
- Crew members: #68 Chris Guccione (crew chief); #86 David Rackley; #33 Nestor Ceja; #50 Charlie Ramos

Career highlights and awards
- Special assignments: Wild Card Series (2024, 2026); Division Series (2025); League Championship Series (2026); All-Star Game (2024); MLB Little League Classic (2024)

Nestor Narciso Ceja (born April 18, 1987) is a Mexican-American Major League Baseball umpire. He made his first appearance at the Major League level in 2020 and was promoted to the full time umpiring staff for the 2023 season.

He wears uniform number 33.

== Career ==
Ceja was introduced to professional baseball umpiring when he attended the 2012 MLB Umpire Camp in Compton, California. He graduated from the Minor League Baseball Umpire Training Academy, and worked in the Florida Instructional League and the Midwest League that season. He then progressed through the California League, and was a crew chief in the Texas League, before being assigned to the Pacific Coast League. He also worked the 2016 All-Star Futures Game, the Arizona Fall League, and was an instructor at the MiLB Training Academy before making his major league debut.

On August 14, 2020, Ceja made his MLB debut. He was at third base for a game between the San Diego Padres and the Arizona Diamondbacks at Chase Field. His crew included Cory Blaser at home plate, Chris Guccione at second, and fellow Mexican umpire Alfonso Marquez at first base. Marquez became a close friend and mentor to Ceja, who considers him to be "a big part of what [he is]".

Ceja umpired 253 games as a Triple A call up before being hired to full time staff in 2023. He was selected to work the 2024 All-Star Game, and was assigned to the National League Wild Card Series that postseason. He was at home plate for game one of the series between the Atlanta Braves and the San Diego Padres.

== Personal life ==
Ceja was born in the state of Michoacán, Mexico, and moved to Los Angeles, California, at the age of one. He attended John F. Kennedy High School before studying at Arizona State University. He was living in LA’s Arleta neighborhood when he began his umpiring career, and currently lives in Texas.

== See also ==
- List of Major League Baseball umpires (disambiguation)
