= Charlie Ramos =

American baseball umpire (born 1988)

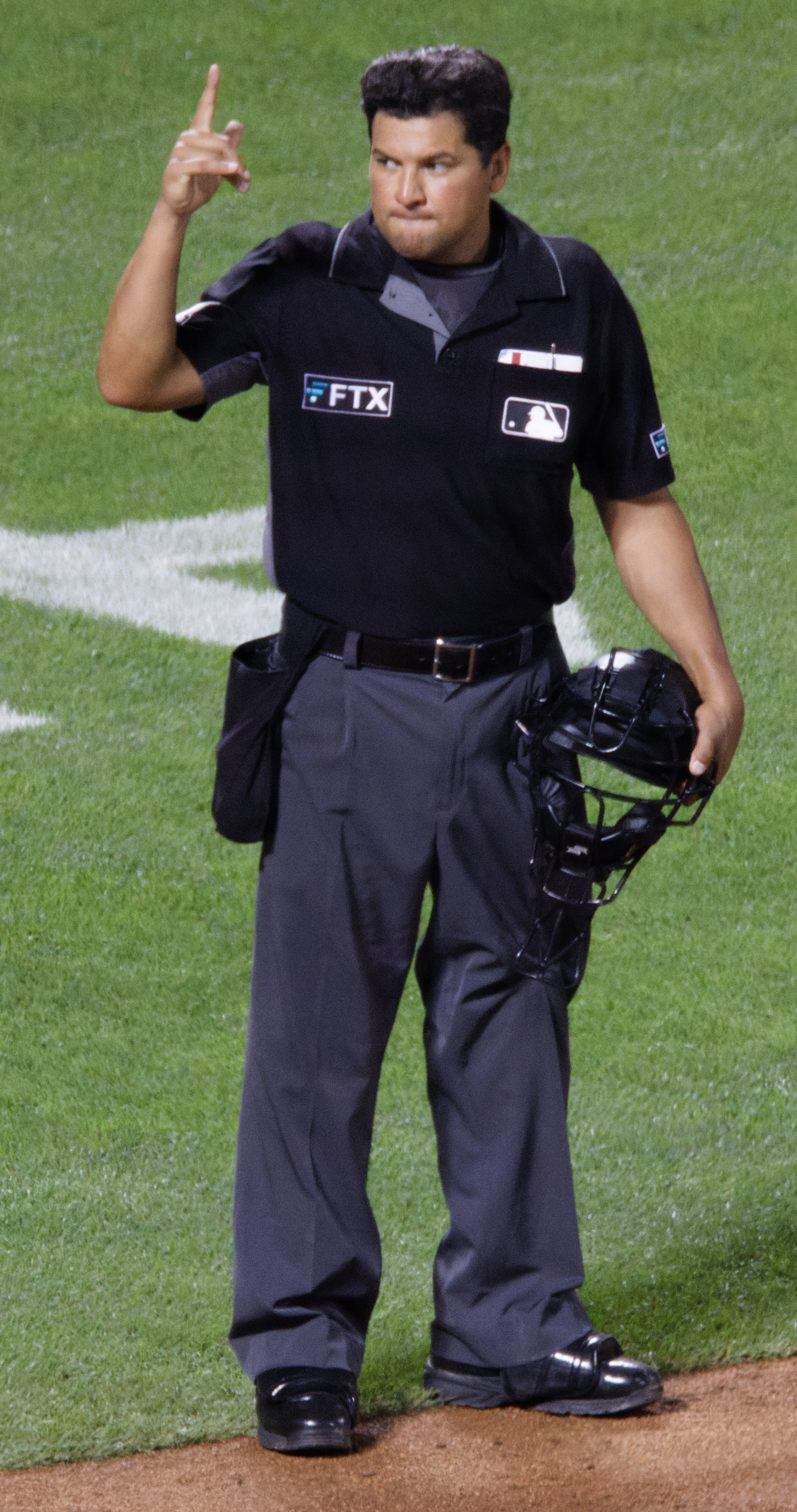
- Ramos in 2022

MLB – No. 50
- Umpire
- Born: 1988 (age 37–38); Grand Rapids, Michigan, U.S.

MLB debut
- August 25, 2020

Crew information
- Umpiring crew: N
- Crew members: #68 Chris Guccione (crew chief); #86 David Rackley; #33 Nestor Ceja; #50 Charlie Ramos

Career highlights and awards
- Special Assignments: Wild Card Games/Series (2026); World Baseball Classic (2026)

Charlie Ramos (born 1988) is an American umpire in Major League Baseball. He wears uniform number 50.

== Career ==
Ramos graduated from Marshall High School in Marshall, Michigan, in 2006. He began umpiring baseball in Marshall when he was fourteen years old. He began umpiring Minor League Baseball games in 2011. He umpired in the Pioneer League, Midwest League, Florida State League, Eastern League and International League. He was a part of the umpiring crew for the 2016 All-Star Futures Game.

Ramos made his major league debut on August 25, 2020, for a game between the Toronto Blue Jays and Boston Red Sox at Sahlen Field. Wearing uniform number 111, he was at second base, with Tripp Gibson at first base, Dan Iassogna as the home plate umpire and fellow call-up umpire Ben May at third base.

MLB promoted Ramos to the permanent staff on August 1, 2025, with the retirement of Brian Knight.

== See also ==
- List of Major League Baseball umpires (disambiguation)
