= Gary Cederstrom =

American baseball umpire (born 1955)

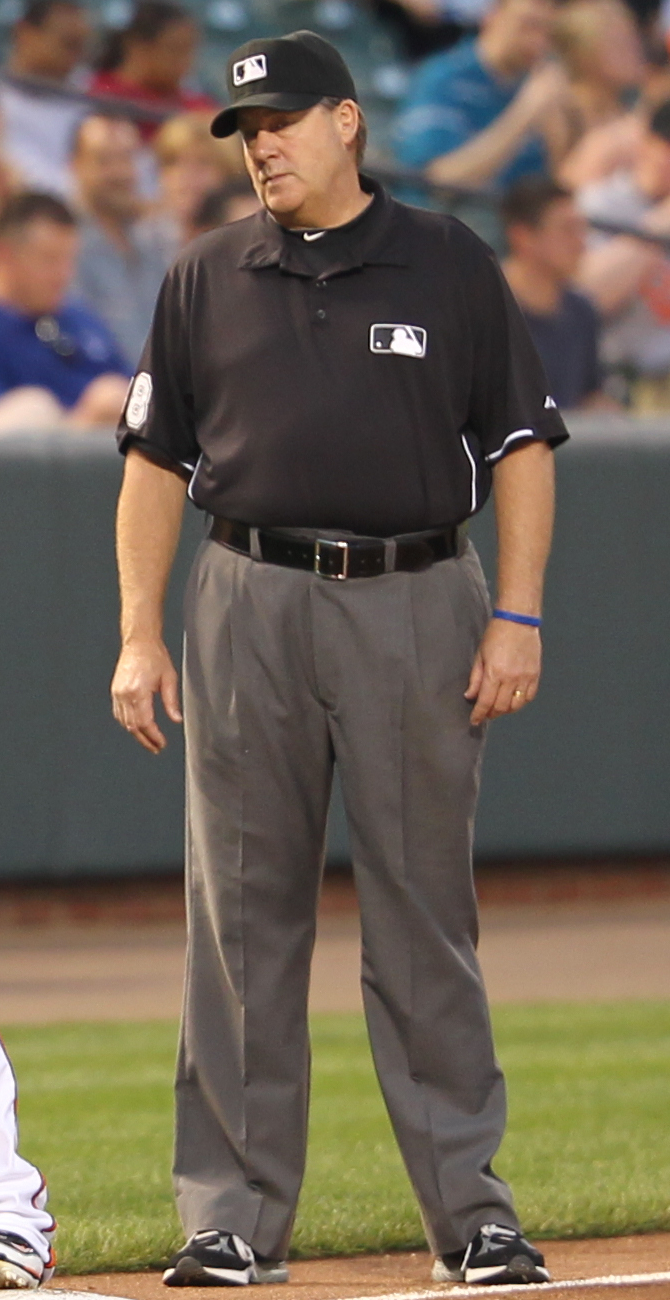
- Cederstrom in 2011
- Born: October 4, 1955 (age 70); Bismarck, North Dakota, U.S.

debut
- June 2, 1989

Last appearance
- October 30, 2019

Career highlights and awards
- Special Assignments: All-Star Game (2003, 2014); Wild Card Game (2012, 2016, 2017); Division Series (2000, 2003, 2004, 2005, 2010, 2011, 2015, 2018, 2019); League Championship Series (2001, 2006, 2007, 2008, 2009, 2012, 2016, 2017); World Series (2005, 2011, 2015, 2019)

Gary L. Cederstrom (born October 4, 1955) is an American former Major League Baseball umpire who worked in the American League from 1989 to 1999 and throughout both major leagues from 2000 to 2019. He wore number 38 throughout his career and was promoted to crew chief for the 2008 season.

== Career ==
He umpired in four World Series (2005, 2011, 2015, and 2019), the last two as the series crew chief. He also worked two All-Star Games (2003, 2014), and in seven League Championship Series: (2001, 2006, 2007, 2008, 2009, 2012, 2016). He also officiated in seven Division Series (2000, 2003, 2004, 2005, 2010, 2011, 2015).

Cederstrom was the third base umpire when Rickey Henderson stole third to break Lou Brock's career record.

He was the first base umpire when Eddie Murray collected his 3000th hit. He was also the third base umpire when Derek Jeter got his 2,721st career hit to tie Lou Gehrig for most hits as a Yankee. He was at second base when Jeter got his 3,000 career hit.

Cederstrom was at third base for Tampa Bay Rays pitcher Matt Garza's no hitter against the Detroit Tigers on July 26, 2010. Cederstrom was behind the plate on June 1, 2012, when Johan Santana threw a no-hitter against St. Louis.

He was the home plate umpire for Game 6 of the 2011 World Series.

He was chosen as one of the umpires for the one-game Wild Card playoff between the Atlanta Braves and the St. Louis Cardinals on October 5, 2012.

In 2017, Cederstrom was the crew chief for the National League Wild Card Game and the American League Championship Series. In 2019, Cederstrom was the crew chief for the American League Division Series A and the World Series.

== Personal life ==
Born in Bismarck, North Dakota, Cederstrom's hometown is Minot. He graduated from Minot High School in 1973, and he received a B.S. in education from Minot State College, where he lettered in baseball for the Beavers. He is succeeded by his son Keaton Cederstrom and his grandson Cameron Burckhard.

== See also ==
- List of Major League Baseball umpires (disambiguation)
