= 2017 National League Wild Card Game =

Postseason game

	1	2	3	4	5	6	7	8	9	R	H	E
Colorado Rockies	0	0	0	4	0	0	1	2	1	8	13	0
Arizona Diamondbacks	3	1	2	0	0	0	2	3	x	11	17	0
- Date: October 4, 2017
- Venue: Chase Field
- City: Phoenix, Arizona
- Managers: Bud Black (Colorado Rockies); Torey Lovullo (Arizona Diamondbacks)
- Umpires: HP: Jim Reynolds; 1B: Gary Cederstrom (crew chief); 2B: Mark Carlson; 3B: Chris Guccione; LF: Jordan Baker; RF: David Rackley
- Attendance: 48,803
- Television: TBS
- TV announcers: Ernie Johnson Jr., Ron Darling, and Sam Ryan
- Radio: ESPN
- Radio announcers: Adam Amin and Eduardo Pérez

The 2017 National League Wild Card Game was a play-in game during Major League Baseball's (MLB) 2017 postseason that was played between the National League's (NL) two wild card teams, the Arizona Diamondbacks and the Colorado Rockies. The game was televised nationally by TBS. The game took place on October 4 at Chase Field in Phoenix, Arizona. with the Diamondbacks winning 11–8, thus eliminating the Rockies from the postseason and advancing the Diamondbacks to the NL Division Series (NLDS) in which they lost to the Los Angeles Dodgers 3–0.

== Background ==
This was Arizona's first playoff appearance as a Wild Card team, and their first postseason appearance since the 2011 National League Division Series. This was Colorado's fourth playoff appearance (all as a Wild Card team), and their first postseason appearance since the 2009 National League Division Series. This was the second postseason match-up between the two division rivals; previously the Rockies swept the Diamondbacks in the 2007 National League Championship Series.

Jon Gray started for the Rockies, and Zack Greinke started for the Diamondbacks.

== Game results ==
=== Line score ===
October 4, 2017 5:08 pm (MST) at Chase Field in Phoenix, Arizona, 76 °F (24 °C), roof closed
Team	1	2	3	4	5	6	7	8	9	R	H	E
Colorado	0	0	0	4	0	0	1	2	1	8	13	0
Arizona	3	1	2	0	0	0	2	3	X	11	17	0
WP: Andrew Chafin (1–0) LP: Jon Gray (0–1); Home runs: COL: Nolan Arenado (1), Trevor Story (1); ARI: Daniel Descalso (1), Paul Goldschmidt (1); Attendance: 48,803; Boxscore

Gray was rocked early, allowing two singles to start the bottom of the first, followed by a three-run home run to Paul Goldschmidt. Gray was ultimately knocked out of the game in the bottom of the second after David Peralta singled and scored on Ketel Marte's triple. Daniel Descalso's two-run home run off Tyler Anderson in the third made it 6–0 Diamondbacks. While Greinke coasted through the first three innings, he was unable to complete the fourth inning. After allowing two singles and recording one out, Gerardo Parra's single, Mark Reynolds's groundout, Jonathan Lucroy's double, and Alexi Amarista's pinch hit single scored a run each and reduced the Diamondbacks' lead to 6–4. This lead was cut further to 6–5 in the seventh when Lucroy doubled, moved to third on Robbie Ray's wild pitch and scored on Charlie Blackmon's bunt groundout off Jorge De La Rosa, but the Diamondbacks extended their lead to 8–5 in the bottom of the inning on Archie Bradley's two-run triple off Pat Neshek. In the process, Bradley not only became the first relief pitcher to record a triple in a playoff game, but also the sixth pitcher in Major League history to record a triple during the playoffs.

Back-to-back home runs by Nolan Arenado and Trevor Story off Bradley in the eighth cut the Diamondbacks' lead back to one. The Diamondbacks responded in the bottom half of the inning with A.J. Pollock's two-run triple off Greg Holland (which made the Diamondbacks the first team since the Boston Americans in 1903 to record four triples in a playoff game). After an intentional walk, Jeff Mathis's RBI squeeze single made it 11–7 Diamondbacks. In the ninth, Ian Desmond hit a leadoff single off Fernando Rodney, who struck out the next two batters, but Desmond advanced two bases on defensive indifferences before scoring on Carlos González's single to cut the Rockies' deficit to 11–8. Arenado then grounded out to end the game as the Diamondbacks advanced to the NLDS.
