= 2012 National League Wild Card Game =

Inaugural edition of Major League Baseball's National League Wild Card Game

	1	2	3	4	5	6	7	8	9	R	H	E
St. Louis Cardinals	0	0	0	3	0	1	2	0	0	6	6	0
Atlanta Braves	0	2	0	0	0	0	1	0	0	3	12	3
- Date: October 5, 1:05 (EDT)
- Venue: Turner Field
- City: Atlanta, Georgia
- Managers: Mike Matheny (St. Louis Cardinals); Fredi González (Atlanta Braves)
- Umpires: Lineup: HP: Jeff Kellogg (crew chief); 1B: Mike Winters; 2B: Gary Cederstrom; 3B: Jeff Nelson; LF: Sam Holbrook; RF: Rob Drake
- Attendance: 52,631
- Television: TBS
- TV announcers: Brian Anderson, Ron Darling, and Joe Simpson
- Radio: ESPN Radio
- Radio announcers: Jon Sciambi and Chris Singleton

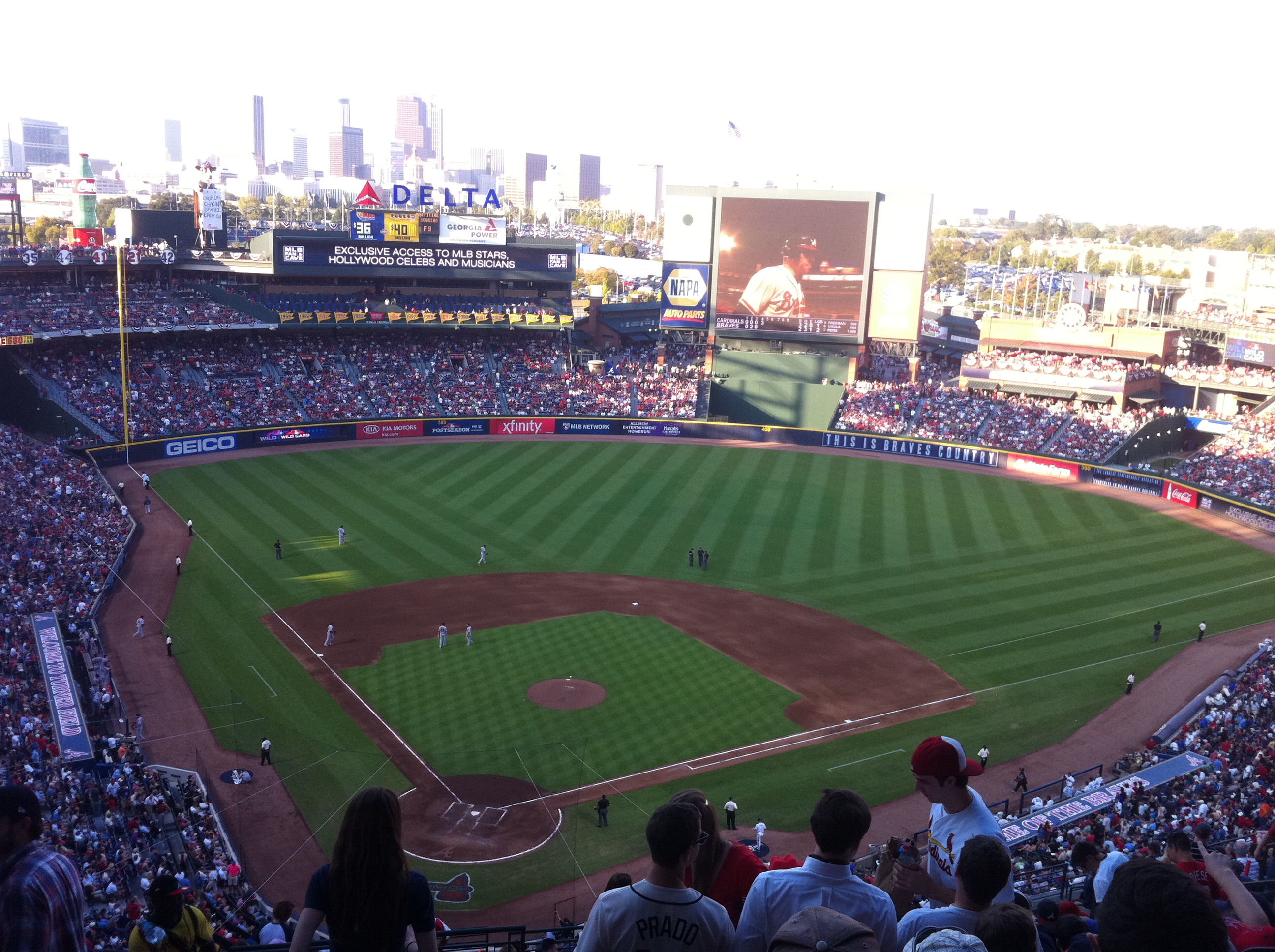
A view of Turner Field during the game

The 2012 National League Wild Card Game was a play-in game during Major League Baseball's (MLB) 2012 postseason played between the National League's (NL) two wild card teams, the St. Louis Cardinals and the Atlanta Braves. It was held at Turner Field in Atlanta, on October 5, 2012, at 5:07 p.m. EDT. The Cardinals won by a 6–3 score and advanced to play the Washington Nationals in the NL Division Series. In addition to being the inaugural NL Wild Card Game, it is notable for being the final game of Chipper Jones’ career, as well as for a controversial infield fly rule call made by umpire Sam Holbrook. The game was televised on TBS.

This was the fourth postseason meeting between the Braves and Cardinals, with St. Louis winning two of the previous three meetings. Atlanta won the 1996 NLCS in seven games, while St. Louis won the 1982 NLCS and 2000 NLDS in three-game sweeps.

== Game results ==
=== Line score ===
October 5, 2012 5:08 pm (EDT) at Turner Field in Atlanta, Georgia, 81 °F (27 °C), clear
Team	1	2	3	4	5	6	7	8	9	R	H	E
St. Louis	0	0	0	3	0	1	2	0	0	6	6	0
Atlanta	0	2	0	0	0	0	1	0	0	3	12	3
WP: Kyle Lohse (1–0) LP: Kris Medlen (0–1) Sv: Jason Motte (1); Home runs: STL: Matt Holliday (1); ATL: David Ross (1); Attendance: 52,631; Boxscore

The Braves started Kris Medlen, who had a 9–0 win–loss record and 0.97 earned run average (ERA) in 12 games started during the 2012 season. The Cardinals selected Kyle Lohse, who had a 16–3 win–loss record and 2.86 ERA during the season, as their starting pitcher.

Lohse allowed a two-run home run to David Ross in the second inning. The Cardinals scored three runs in the fourth inning, in which Chipper Jones committed a throwing error, taking a 3–2 lead. Medlen allowed a home run to Matt Holliday in the sixth inning. After the Cardinals scored two more runs in the top of the seventh inning, the Braves scored one in the bottom of the seventh.

In the bottom of the eighth inning, Andrelton Simmons hit a fly ball to left field that dropped in between Cardinals shortstop Pete Kozma and left fielder Holliday. Left field umpire Sam Holbrook called Simmons out, citing the infield fly rule. (Note: The infield fly rule states, in part, that the batter is out when, with first and second base occupied with less than two outs, the batter hits a fair fly ball which is not a line drive nor bunt, and this fly ball can be caught by an infielder with ordinary effort.) Had an infield fly not been called, Simmons would have been credited with a single and Atlanta would have had the bases loaded with one out, trailing 6–3. Fans littered the field with trash, delaying the game for 19 minutes before a message over the Turner Field public address system advised fans the game was subject to forfeiture by the umpires if the field continued to remain unplayable due to the thrown debris. Atlanta manager Fredi González announced that the Braves would play the rest of the game under protest. The protest was denied shortly after the game by Joe Torre, MLB executive vice president for baseball operations, saying it was a judgment call—which cannot be protested under MLB rules. Prior to the game, MLB's official Twitter bio included the joke "We don't understand the infield fly rule either". This was quickly removed in light of the controversial call.

Following the controversial play, Cardinals closer Jason Motte entered the game and walked the next batter to load the bases, but then struck out Michael Bourn to end the inning without allowing the Braves to score. With two outs and nobody on base in the bottom of the ninth inning, Chipper Jones extended the game with an infield single in his final Major League at-bat. Freddie Freeman hit a ground rule double, bringing Dan Uggla to bat as the potential tying run. Motte retired Uggla with a groundout to record the save, then both teams rushed off the field after fans resumed throwing debris.
