= Chris Guccione =

Chris Guccione may refer to:

- Chris Guccione (tennis) (born 1985), Australian tennis player
- Chris Guccione (umpire) (born 1974), umpire in Major League Baseball
