= Fort Bragg Game =

Special Major League Baseball event

	1	2	3	4	5	6	7	8	9	R	H	E
Miami Marlins	0	0	0	0	2	0	1	1	1	5	13	1
Atlanta Braves	0	0	0	0	0	0	0	0	2	2	5	0
- Date: July 3, 2016
- Venue: Fort Bragg Stadium
- City: Fort Bragg, North Carolina, United States
- Managers: Don Mattingly (Miami Marlins); Brian Snitker (Atlanta Braves)
- Umpires: HP: Alfonso Márquez; 1B: Larry Vanover (Note: Crew Chief); 2B: David Rackley; 3B: Chris Guccione
- Attendance: 12,582
- Ceremonial first pitch: SFC Corey Calkins, US Army
- Television: ESPN
- TV announcers: Dan Shulman (play-by-play); Aaron Boone (analyst); Jessica Mendoza (analyst); Buster Olney (reporter)
- Radio: ESPN Radio, ESPN Deportes Radio

The Fort Bragg Game was a Major League Baseball (MLB) specialty game played on July 3, 2016 between the Miami Marlins and Atlanta Braves of the National League. It was held at Fort Bragg, North Carolina, United States, becoming the first regular season professional sports event ever held on an active U.S. military base, and the first MLB game played in the state. The game was broadcast on Sunday Night Baseball on ESPN. The Marlins defeated the Braves, 5–2. After the game, the grandstands were removed, and the field became a multi-use sporting ground.

== Background ==
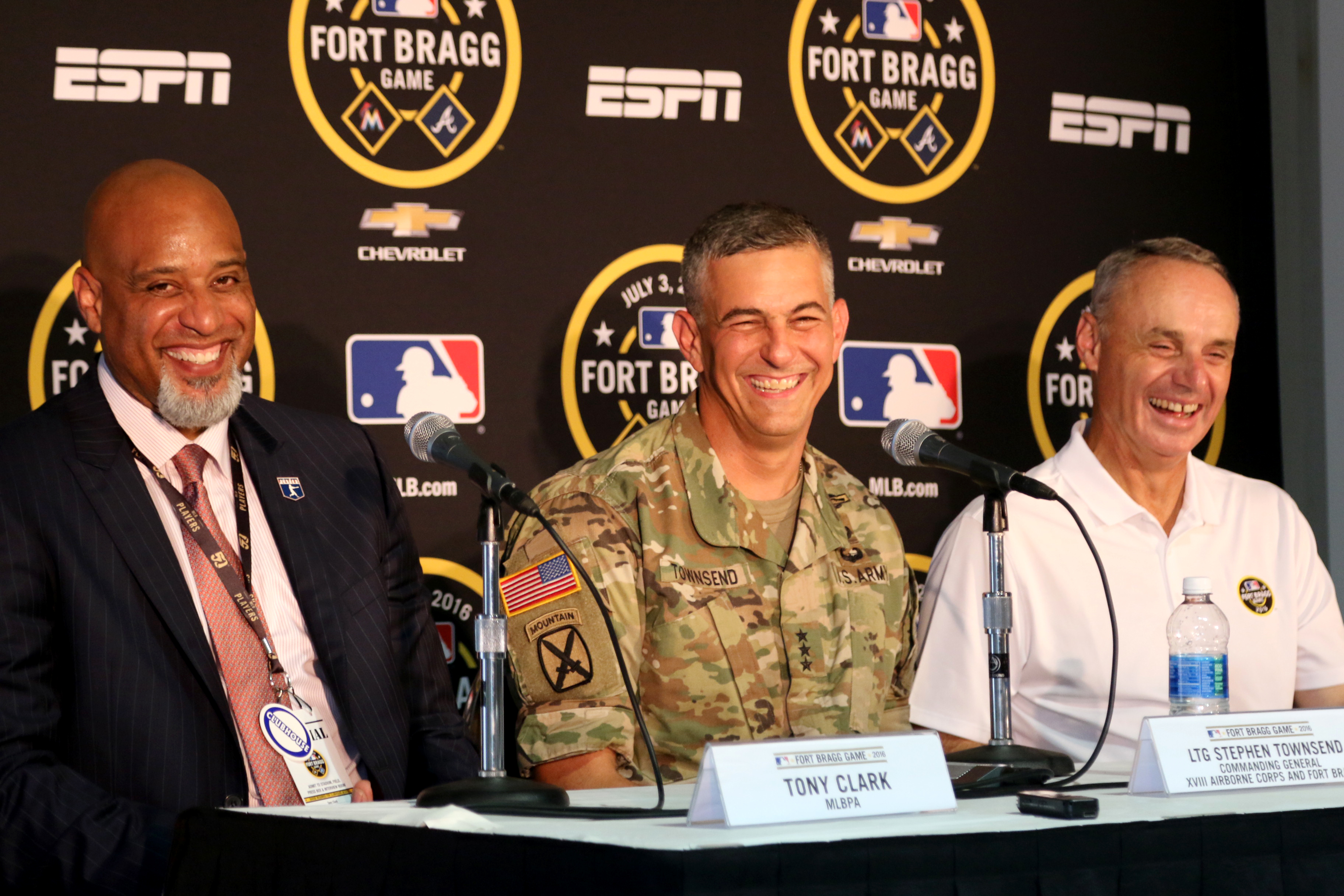
Tony Clark (left), Lt. Gen. Stephen J. Townsend (center), and Rob Manfred (right) at a pregame press conference

In 2015, Major League Baseball (MLB) approached the United States Department of Defense with an idea to host a regular season MLB game at a military base. The following March, MLB Commissioner Rob Manfred publicly announced that the Miami Marlins and Atlanta Braves would play a regular season game at Fort Bragg on July 3, 2016, the day before Independence Day, to honor the nation's military. MLB and the MLB Players Association spent $5 million to convert an unused golf course on the base into a stadium with a capacity of 12,500. Tickets for the game were free to military personnel and their families through a lottery system.

The Fort Bragg Game became the first regular season professional sporting event to ever be held on an active military base, and the first MLB regular season game ever held in the state of North Carolina. The game aired on ESPN as part of their Sunday Night Baseball coverage. Dan Shulman provided play-by-play, while Jessica Mendoza and Aaron Boone served as analysts and Buster Olney as a game reporter. ESPN also distributed the game on ESPN Radio, ESPN Deportes, and ESPN Deportes Radio.

Before the game, players visited the Womack Army Medical Center. Manfred, Joe Torre, and MLBPA Director Tony Clark visited the local Fisher House. A baseball clinic for over 200 children was held on July 2. After the game, the grounds was converted into a softball field and multipurpose recreational complex for active duty personnel.

== Game ==
MLB allowed each team to carry an additional position player on their active roster; the Braves called up Ronnier Mustelier from the Triple-A Gwinnett Braves, while the Marlins called up Yefri Pérez from the Double-A Jacksonville Suns. Neither player appeared in the game and Mustelier never played in a game in Major League Baseball.

=== Recap ===
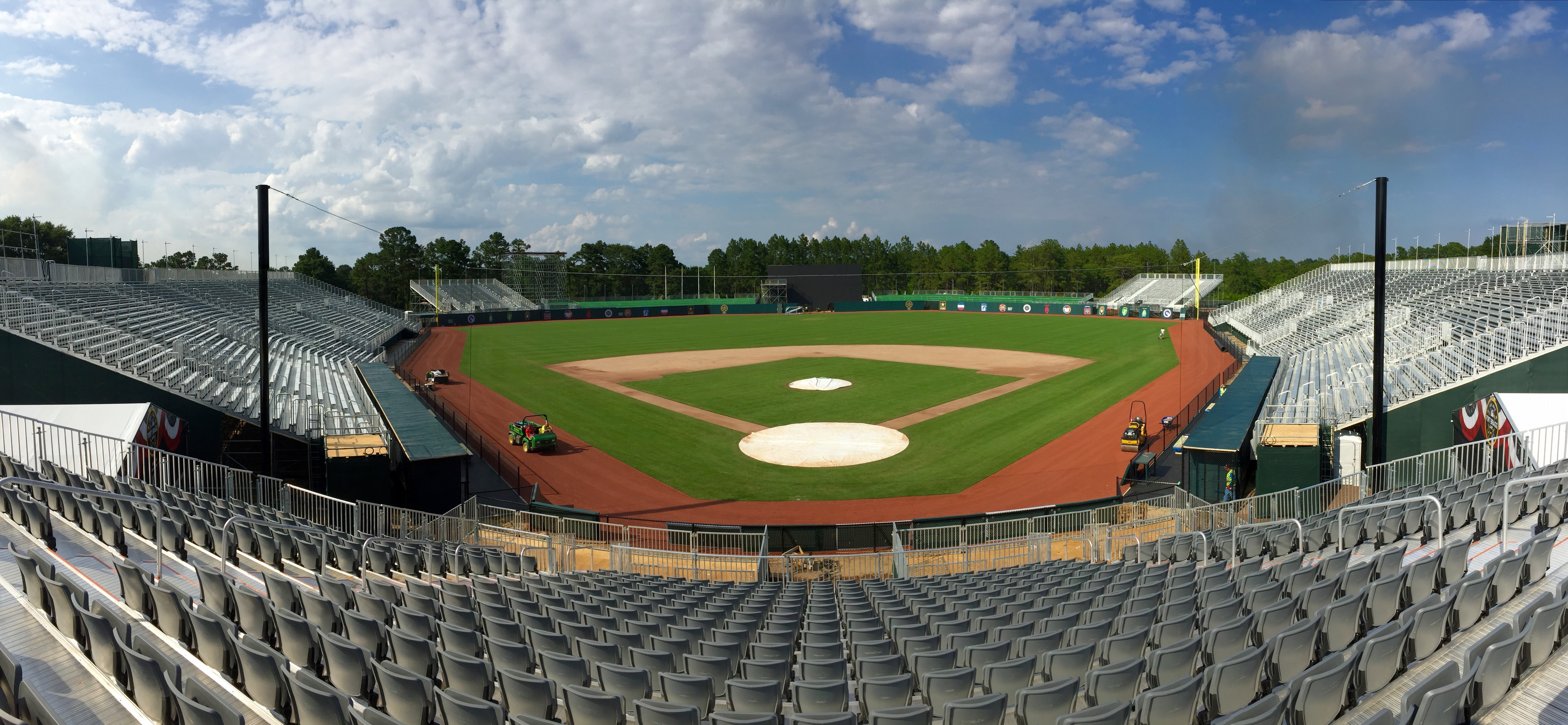
Fort Bragg Stadium was built solely to host the Fort Bragg Game

The Braves served as the home team, while the Marlins were the visitors. Adam Conley was the starting pitcher for Miami, and Matt Wisler started for Atlanta. The game was scoreless through four innings. In the fifth inning, Adeiny Hechavarria hit a lead-off triple and scored on a single by J. T. Realmuto, who later scored on a single by Christian Yelich. In the bottom of the fifth, the Braves loaded the bases but did not score.

The Marlins scored three more runs in the final three innings; Realmuto scored on an RBI single by Martin Prado in the seventh inning, Giancarlo Stanton hit a lead-off triple and scored on a sacrifice fly by Derek Dietrich in the eighth, and Realmuto hit a solo home run in the ninth. The Braves scored two runs in the bottom of the ninth when Erick Aybar hit a double that scored Tyler Flowers, and A. J. Pierzynski hit a sacrifice fly that scored Jeff Francoeur, but were unable to narrow the gap further. The win increased Miami's win–loss record to 43–39 (.524 winning percentage), 6 1/2 games behind the Washington Nationals in the National League East and 1 1/2 games out of a wild card slot. The loss dropped the Braves to 28–54 (.341), the worst record in MLB.

=== Line score ===
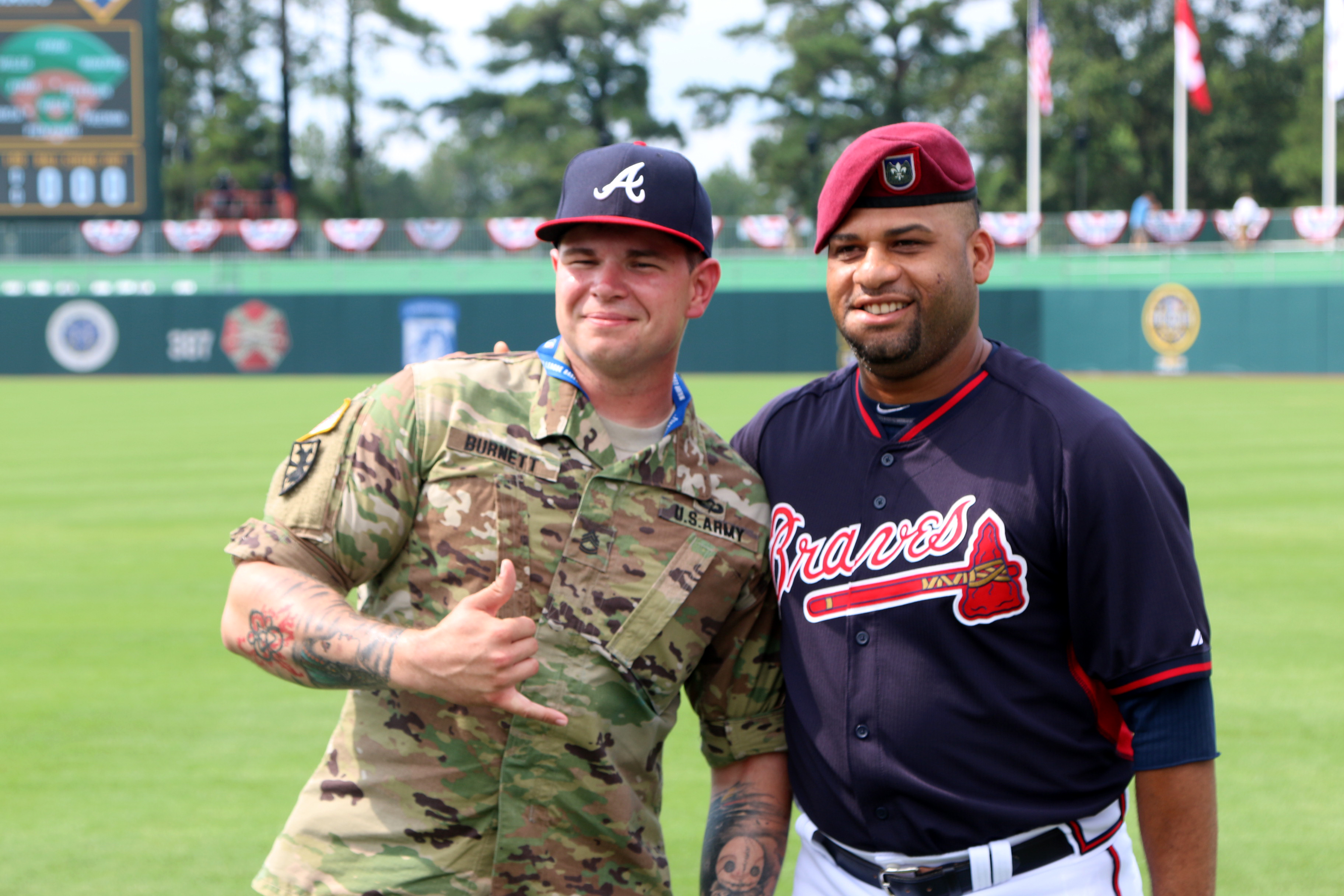
Sgt. 1st Class Alex Burnett (left) and Arodys Vizcaíno (right)

Team	1	2	3	4	5	6	7	8	9	R	H	E
Miami Marlins	0	0	0	0	2	0	1	1	1	5	13	1
Atlanta Braves	0	0	0	0	0	0	0	0	2	2	5	0
WP: Adam Conley (5–5) LP: Matt Wisler (3–8); Home runs: Away: J. T. Realmuto (5); Home: None; Attendance: 12,582 Time: 2:59; Umpires: Alfonso Márquez, Larry Vanover, David Rackley, Chris Guccione

=== Box score ===
Marlins	AB	R	H	RBI	BB	SO	AVG
J. T. Realmuto, C	5	3	3	2	0	2	.314
Martín Prado, 3B	5	0	3	1	0	1	.320
Christian Yelich, LF	5	0	3	1	0	0	.315
Marcell Ozuna, CF	5	0	0	0	0	2	.311
Giancarlo Stanton, RF	4	1	1	0	1	1	.219
Derek Dietrich, 2B	2	0	0	1	1	0	.300
Miguel Rojas, 2B	1	0	0	0	0	0	.250
Chris Johnson, 1B	4	0	0	0	0	1	.233
Adeiny Hechavarria, SS	3	1	2	0	1	0	.245
Adam Conley, SP	3	0	1	0	0	0	.034
David Phelps, RP	0	0	0	0	0	0	.500
Ichiro Suzuki, PH	1	0	0	0	0	0	.335
Fernando Rodney, RP	0	0	0	0	0	0	—
A. J. Ramos, P	0	0	0	0	0	0	—

Pitching

Marlins	IP	H	R	ER	BB	SO	HR	ERA
Adam Conley (W)	6	4	0	0	1	2	0	3.65
David Phelps (H)	1	0	0	0	0	2	0	2.25
Fernando Rodney	1	0	0	0	0	0	0	0.29
A. J. Ramos	1	1	2	2	1	2	0	2.45

Braves	AB	R	H	RBI	BB	SO	AVG
Jace Peterson, 2B	5	0	0	0	0	3	.283
Chase d'Arnaud, CF	3	0	0	0	0	1	.265
Freddie Freeman, 1B	3	0	2	0	1	0	.292
Nick Markakis, RF	4	0	0	0	0	0	.253
Adonis García, 3B	4	0	0	0	0	1	.232
Tyler Flowers, C	2	1	0	0	0	0	.255
Jeff Francoeur, LF	3	1	0	0	1	0	.254
Erick Aybar, SS	4	0	2	1	0	0	.225
Matt Wisler, SP	2	0	0	0	0	0	.067
Ian Krol, RP	0	0	0	0	0	0	.000
Chris Withrow, RP	0	0	0	0	0	0	—
Emilio Bonifacio, PH	1	0	0	0	0	1	.148
Tyrell Jenkins, RP	0	0	0	0	0	0	.000
A. J. Pierzynski, PH	0	0	0	1	0	0	.199

Pitching

Braves	IP	H	R	ER	BB	SO	HR	ERA
Matt Wisler (L)	6	10	3	3	1	6	0	4.16
Ian Krol	2/3	0	0	0	0	0	0	2.86
Chris Withrow	1/3	0	0	0	0	0	0	3.68
Tyrell Jenkins	2	3	2	2	2	1	1	5.79

=== Zack Hample controversy ===
Zack Hample, a baseball collector who is not active duty military personnel, sought a ticket to the game on social media, offering to pay up to $1,000 for a ticket. Hample received a ticket from a military personnel that had a "plus-one" ticket and announced that he would donate $100 for every ball he collected to a charity for military veterans. Hample claimed to have caught 11 balls and claimed he would donate $1,100 to AMVETS. After he came under widespread criticism for taking a ticket to a game that was meant for military personnel, he posted a lengthy apology on Twitter, which CBS sportswriter Mike Axisa stated "boils down to 'I'm sorry but I really wanted to go.'"

== See also ==
- List of neutral site regular season Major League Baseball games played in the United States and Canada
