= 2021 Major League Baseball All-Star Game =

2021 American baseball competition

	1	2	3	4	5	6	7	8	9	R	H	E
American League	0	1	1	0	2	1	0	0	0	5	9	1
National League	0	0	0	0	1	1	0	0	0	2	8	1
- Date: July 13, 2021
- Venue: Coors Field
- City: Denver, Colorado
- Managers: Kevin Cash (TB); Dave Roberts (LAD)
- MVP: Vladimir Guerrero Jr. (TOR)
- Attendance: 49,184
- Ceremonial first pitch: Peyton Manning
- Television: Fox (United States); Fox Deportes; MLB International (International)
- TV announcers: Joe Buck, John Smoltz, Ken Rosenthal and Tom Verducci (Fox); Adrian Garcia Marquez, Carlos Alvarez and Edgar Gonzalez (Fox Deportes); Scott Braun and Cliff Floyd (MLB International)
- Radio: ESPN
- Radio announcers: Jon Sciambi and Chris Singleton

The 2021 Major League Baseball All-Star Game was the 91st Major League Baseball All-Star Game. The game was hosted by the Colorado Rockies and played at Coors Field on July 13. It was broadcast nationally by Fox, Fox Deportes, and ESPN Radio.

The American League (AL) defeated the National League (NL) 5–2. It was the eighth consecutive All-Star Game victory for the AL.

The game was originally to be hosted in Atlanta at Truist Park. However, following the Georgia State Legislature's passage of the Election Integrity Act of 2021, the game was moved to Coors Field in Denver. The All-Star Game was the second to be played in Denver after the 1998 game.

Kevin Cash of the Tampa Bay Rays managed the AL and Dave Roberts of the defending World Series champion Los Angeles Dodgers managed the NL. For the first time in All-Star Game history, Los Angeles Angels player Shohei Ohtani served as the starting pitcher and lead-off batter. The matchup also featured the 200th home run of the All-Star Game, which was hit by Toronto Blue Jays player Vladimir Guerrero Jr.

== Background ==
=== Host selection ===
==== Original selection of Atlanta ====
Atlanta was originally awarded the game on May 30, 2019; it was to be the first All-Star Game hosted by Truist Park and the third All-Star Game played in Atlanta after the 1972 and 2000 editions.

==== Georgia voting law and relocation to Denver ====
In March 2021, there were calls for the All-Star Game to be moved from Atlanta, in protest of the Georgia State Legislature's passage of the Election Integrity Act of 2021. The bill contains various provisions that impact how elections are conducted in the state; some of these provisions have been considered by many on the political left to have a disproportionate impact on certain communities, such as African Americans and Hispanic Americans, MLBPA executive director Tony Clark stated that he was "very much aware" of the issue, and that he was willing to discuss the matter with Commissioner of Baseball Rob Manfred. A sizeable portion of the player base and fan base are Hispanic and that had factored into the relocation threat.

In an interview with ESPN's Sage Steele on March 31, President Joe Biden stated that he would "strongly support" moving the game out of Georgia, saying that Republican efforts to make voting laws more restrictive following the 2020 presidential election were "Jim Crow on steroids". On April 1, Manfred stated that he was "talking to various constituencies within the game and I'm just not going beyond that in terms of what I would consider or not consider." In an April 1 interview with Fox News, Georgia Governor Brian Kemp criticized the efforts, calling them "ridiculous".

On April 2, MLB announced that the game and the 2021 MLB draft (which was added to the All-Star festivities this year) would be moved from Georgia, and that the game would be relocated to a different city in another state, to be determined. Commissioner Manfred stated that "Major League Baseball fundamentally supports voting rights for all Americans and opposes restrictions to the ballot box." Governor Kemp later responded by saying that he would not back down over his decision, claiming that MLB caved to "fear, political opportunism, and liberal lies." Kemp also claimed that the move was an example of cancel culture. In a statement shared on Truth Social, former President Donald Trump also criticized the decision, calling for a boycott of MLB. Texas Governor Greg Abbott cancelled a planned appearance at the Texas Rangers' home opener, where he had been scheduled to throw out the first pitch, in protest of the decision to move the game. In a letter to the Rangers stating his decision, Abbott also wrote that he would not participate in any future events organized by MLB and that Texas would not bid to host future All-Star games or other MLB special events. (They would eventually host the All-Star game in 2024). On Twitter, former Georgia gubernatorial candidate Stacey Abrams at first called for the change; however, she later recognized the decision was not received well by Georgia citizens and eventually stated her disappointment over the decision, saying, "I don't want to see Georgia families hurt by lost events and jobs," while also stating that she understood why it was made. In a tweet, former President Barack Obama also praised MLB for moving the game out of Georgia. Atlanta Mayor Keisha Lance Bottoms also supported the move. However, Bottoms, like Georgia's two United States Senators, represent Fulton County, while the Braves, and Truist Park, is located in Cobb County. Legislators that represent Cobb County, home county of the Braves and Truist Park supported the bill.

On April 14, five Republican senators and representatives introduced legislation to strip Major League Baseball of its antitrust exemption in response to the move.

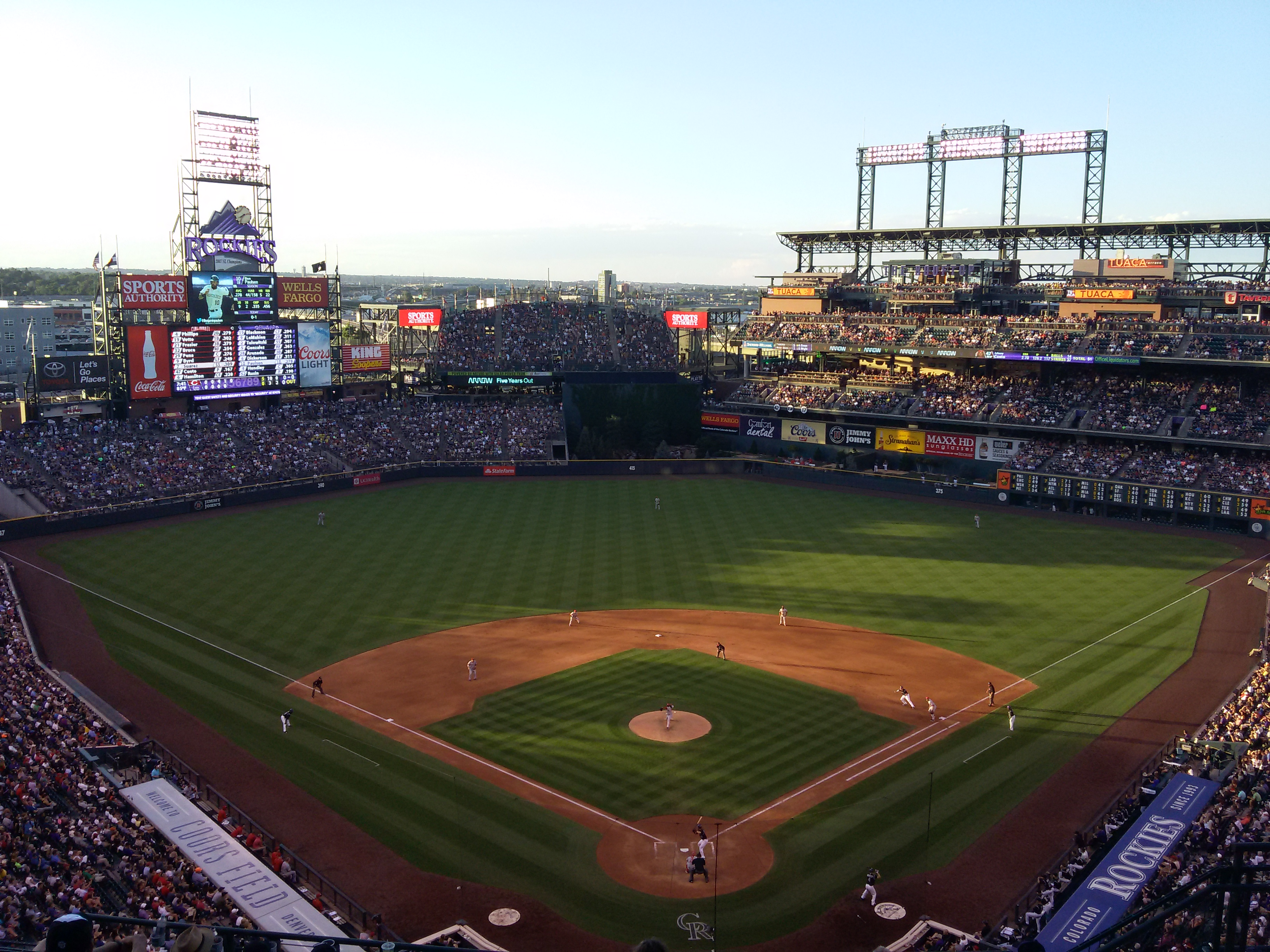
Coors Field

An April 5 Morning Consult poll found that 39% of U.S. adults approved of the move while 28% percent of U.S. adults disapproved, and 32% of U.S. adults stated they had no opinion or didn't know about the move. Overall support for the move was higher among MLB fans, Democrats, and people of color compared to the general population. Data from Morning Consult Brand Intelligence also showed that Republican approval of MLB dropped by 35 percentage points from 47 points to 12 points.

The 2021 MLB All-Star Game became at least the third major sporting event in the United States to be relocated for political reasons. Prior relocations that were announced in protest of states' political decisions include the 2017 NBA All-Star Game, which the NBA relocated in 2016 from Charlotte, North Carolina, in response to the passage of Public Facilities Privacy & Security Act which critics found transphobic, and Super Bowl XXVII, which the NFL relocated in 1990 from Tempe, Arizona, in response to a failed state referendum to recognize Martin Luther King Jr. Day.

On April 5, MLB announced that Coors Field in Denver would host the All-Star Game.

=== Logo and jerseys ===
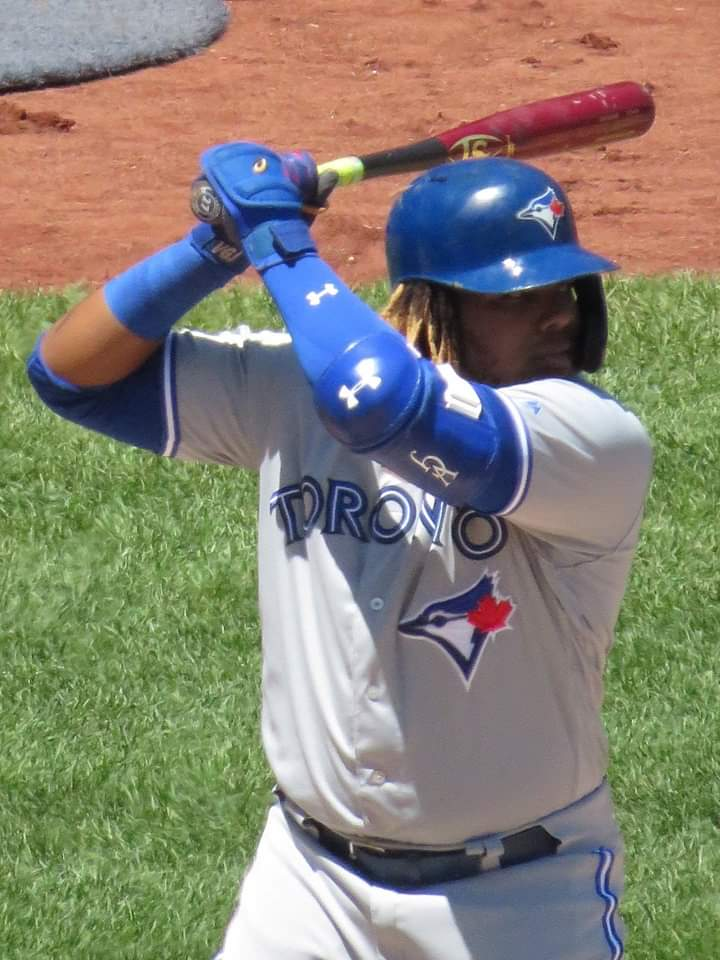
Vladimir Guerrero Jr., overall vote leader and AL starting first baseman

On April 23, the All-Star Game logo was unveiled, featuring the Rockies' colors of purple, white, black, and silver with a profile representing the Rocky Mountains at the bottom. On June 24, MLB announced that players would wear standardized jerseys during the All-Star Game, rather than their own team's jerseys—navy blue for American League players and white for National League players.

=== Roster selections ===
Voting for All-Star Game starting players was conducted in two phases: the first phase determined three finalists for each defensive position in each league (with nine finalists for the three outfield positions in each league) plus a designated hitter for the American League, and the second phase determined the starting players. Voting for each phase was independent; that is, votes did not carry over between phases. First phase voting was held from June 3 through June 24, and second phase voting was June 28 through July 1. All voting was conducted online, at MLB.com (or associated mobile applications) or via Google Search. Starting players, as selected via voting, were announced on July 1. Reserve position players and all pitchers—selected through "a combination of Player Ballot selections and choices made by the Commissioner’s Office"—were announced on July 4.

Under MLB rules, at least one player from each major-league team has to be selected for the game. However, there is no requirement for each team to have a player rostered for the game—for various reasons, each of the four players from the Houston Astros selected to the game became unavailable, leaving the Astros without a player on the American League's active roster for the game.

The total of 40 players named All-Stars for the first time set a new MLB record.

== Rosters ==
=== American League ===
Elected starters
Position	Player	Team	All-Star Games
C	Salvador Pérez	Royals	7
1B	Vladimir Guerrero Jr.	Blue Jays	1
2B	Marcus Semien	Blue Jays	1
3B	Rafael Devers	Red Sox	1
SS	Xander Bogaerts	Red Sox	3
OF	Mike Trout^{#}	Angels	9
OF	Aaron Judge	Yankees	3
OF	Teoscar Hernández	Blue Jays	1
DH	Shohei Ohtani	Angels	1

Reserves
Position	Player	Team	All-Star Games
C	Mike Zunino	Rays	1
1B	Matt Olson	Athletics	1
1B	Jared Walsh	Angels	1
2B	Jose Altuve^{#}	Astros	7
2B	Whit Merrifield^{[E]}	Royals	2
3B	José Ramírez	Indians	3
3B	Joey Wendle^{[F]}	Rays	1
SS	Bo Bichette	Blue Jays	1
SS	Tim Anderson^{[C]}	White Sox	1
SS	Carlos Correa^{#}	Astros	2
OF	Michael Brantley^{#}	Astros	5
OF	Joey Gallo	Rangers	2
OF	Adolis García	Rangers	1
OF	Cedric Mullins^{[M]}	Orioles	1
DH	Nelson Cruz	Twins	7
DH	J. D. Martinez	Red Sox	4

Pitchers
Player	Team	All-Star Games
Matt Barnes	Red Sox	1
Chris Bassitt^{[D]}	Athletics	1
Shane Bieber	Indians	2
Aroldis Chapman	Yankees	7
Gerrit Cole^{#}	Yankees	4
Nathan Eovaldi	Red Sox	1
Kyle Gibson	Rangers	1
Liam Hendriks	White Sox	2
Yusei Kikuchi^{#}	Mariners	1
Andrew Kittredge^{[P]}	Rays	1
Lance Lynn	White Sox	2
Shohei Ohtani	Angels	1
Ryan Pressly^{#}	Astros	2
Carlos Rodón	White Sox	1
Taylor Rogers^{[Q]}	Twins	1
Gregory Soto	Tigers	1

=== National League ===
Elected starters
Position	Player	Team	All-Star Games
C	Buster Posey^{#}	Giants	7
1B	Freddie Freeman	Braves	5
2B	Adam Frazier	Pirates	1
3B	Nolan Arenado	Cardinals	6
SS	Fernando Tatís Jr.	Padres	1
OF	Ronald Acuña Jr.^{#}	Braves	2
OF	Nick Castellanos	Reds	1
OF	Jesse Winker	Reds	1

Reserves
Position	Player	Team	All-Star Games
C	Yadier Molina^{[J]}^{#}	Cardinals	10
C	Omar Narváez^{[K]}	Brewers	1
C	J. T. Realmuto^{[O]}	Phillies	3
1B	Max Muncy	Dodgers	2
2B	Ozzie Albies	Braves	2
2B	Jake Cronenworth	Padres	1
3B	Kris Bryant	Cubs	4
3B	Eduardo Escobar	Diamondbacks	1
3B	Manny Machado^{[L]}	Padres	5
3B	Justin Turner^{[H]}	Dodgers	2
SS	Brandon Crawford	Giants	3
SS	Trea Turner	Nationals	1
OF	Mookie Betts^{#}	Dodgers	5
OF	Bryan Reynolds^{[N]}	Pirates	1
OF	Kyle Schwarber^{#}	Nationals	1
OF	Juan Soto	Nationals	1
OF	Chris Taylor	Dodgers	1

Pitchers
Player	Team	All-Star Games
Walker Buehler^{[G]}	Dodgers	2
Corbin Burnes	Brewers	1
Yu Darvish^{#}	Padres	5
Jacob deGrom^{#}	Mets	4
Kevin Gausman^{#}	Giants	1
Josh Hader	Brewers	3
Craig Kimbrel	Cubs	8
Germán Márquez	Rockies	1
Mark Melancon	Padres	4
Freddy Peralta^{[B]}	Brewers	1
Alex Reyes	Cardinals	1
Trevor Rogers	Marlins	1
Max Scherzer^{[I]}	Nationals	8
Taijuan Walker^{[A]}	Mets	1
Zack Wheeler	Phillies	1
Brandon Woodruff^{#}	Brewers	2

==== Roster notes ====
1. Taijuan Walker was named as the roster replacement for Jacob deGrom due to deGrom opting not to play.
2. Freddy Peralta was named as the roster replacement for Brandon Woodruff due to Woodruff starting on Sunday.
3. Tim Anderson was named as the roster replacement for Carlos Correa due to Correa opting not to play.
4. Chris Bassitt was named as the roster replacement for Ryan Pressly due to Pressly opting not to play.
5. Whit Merrifield was named as the roster replacement for Jose Altuve due to injury.
6. Joey Wendle was named as the roster replacement for Michael Brantley due to injury.
7. Walker Buehler was named as the roster replacement for Yu Darvish due to injury.
8. Justin Turner was named as the roster replacement for Mookie Betts due to injury.
9. Max Scherzer was named as the roster replacement for Kevin Gausman due to Gausman starting on Sunday.
10. Yadier Molina was named as the roster replacement for Buster Posey due to injury.
11. Omar Narváez was named as the roster replacement for Yadier Molina due to injury.
12. Manny Machado was named as the roster replacement for Ronald Acuña Jr. due to injury.
13. Cedric Mullins was named starter in place of Mike Trout due to injury.
14. Bryan Reynolds was named starter in place of Ronald Acuña Jr. due to injury.
15. J. T. Realmuto was named starter in place of Buster Posey due to injury.
16. Andrew Kittredge was named as the roster replacement for Gerrit Cole due to Cole throwing 129 pitches on Saturday.
17. Taylor Rogers was named as the roster replacement for Yusei Kikuchi due to injury.

#: Indicates player would not play (replaced as per reference notes above).

== Game summary ==
MLB allowed the American League to roster Shohei Ohtani as both the team's starting pitcher and starting designated hitter (DH), allowing Ohtani (and his replacement) to continue as DH even after he was removed from the game as a pitcher.

=== Starting lineup ===
American League
Order	Player	Team	Position
1	Shohei Ohtani	Angels	DH
2	Vladimir Guerrero Jr.	Blue Jays	1B
3	Xander Bogaerts	Red Sox	SS
4	Aaron Judge	Yankees	RF
5	Rafael Devers	Red Sox	3B
6	Marcus Semien	Blue Jays	2B
7	Salvador Pérez	Royals	C
8	Teoscar Hernández	Blue Jays	LF
9	Cedric Mullins	Orioles	CF
	Shohei Ohtani	Angels	P

National League
Order	Player	Team	Position
1	Fernando Tatís Jr.	Padres	SS
2	Max Muncy	Dodgers	DH
3	Nolan Arenado	Cardinals	3B
4	Freddie Freeman	Braves	1B
5	Nick Castellanos	Reds	RF
6	Jesse Winker	Reds	LF
7	J. T. Realmuto	Phillies	C
8	Bryan Reynolds	Pirates	CF
9	Adam Frazier	Pirates	2B
	Max Scherzer	Nationals	P

=== Line score ===
July 13, 2021 5:18 pm (MDT) Coors Field in Denver, Colorado, 84 °F (29 °C), cloudy
Team	1	2	3	4	5	6	7	8	9	R	H	E
American League	0	1	1	0	2	1	0	0	0	5	9	1
National League	0	0	0	0	1	1	0	0	0	2	8	1
Starting pitchers: AL: Shohei Ohtani; NL: Max Scherzer; WP: Shohei Ohtani (1–0) LP: Corbin Burnes (0–1) Sv: Liam Hendriks (1); Home runs: AL: Vladimir Guerrero Jr., Mike Zunino (1); NL: J. T. Realmuto (1); Attendance: 49,184 Time: 3:00; Umpires: HP – Tom Hallion (crew chief); 1B – CB Bucknor; 2B – Chris Guccione; 3B – Lance Barrett; LF – David Rackley; RF – Adam Hamari; Replay Official – Greg Gibson; Boxscore

== See also ==
- List of Major League Baseball All-Star Games
- Major League Baseball All-Star Game Most Valuable Player Award
- All-Star Futures Game
- Home Run Derby
