= Chris Guccione (umpire) =

American baseball umpire (born 1974)

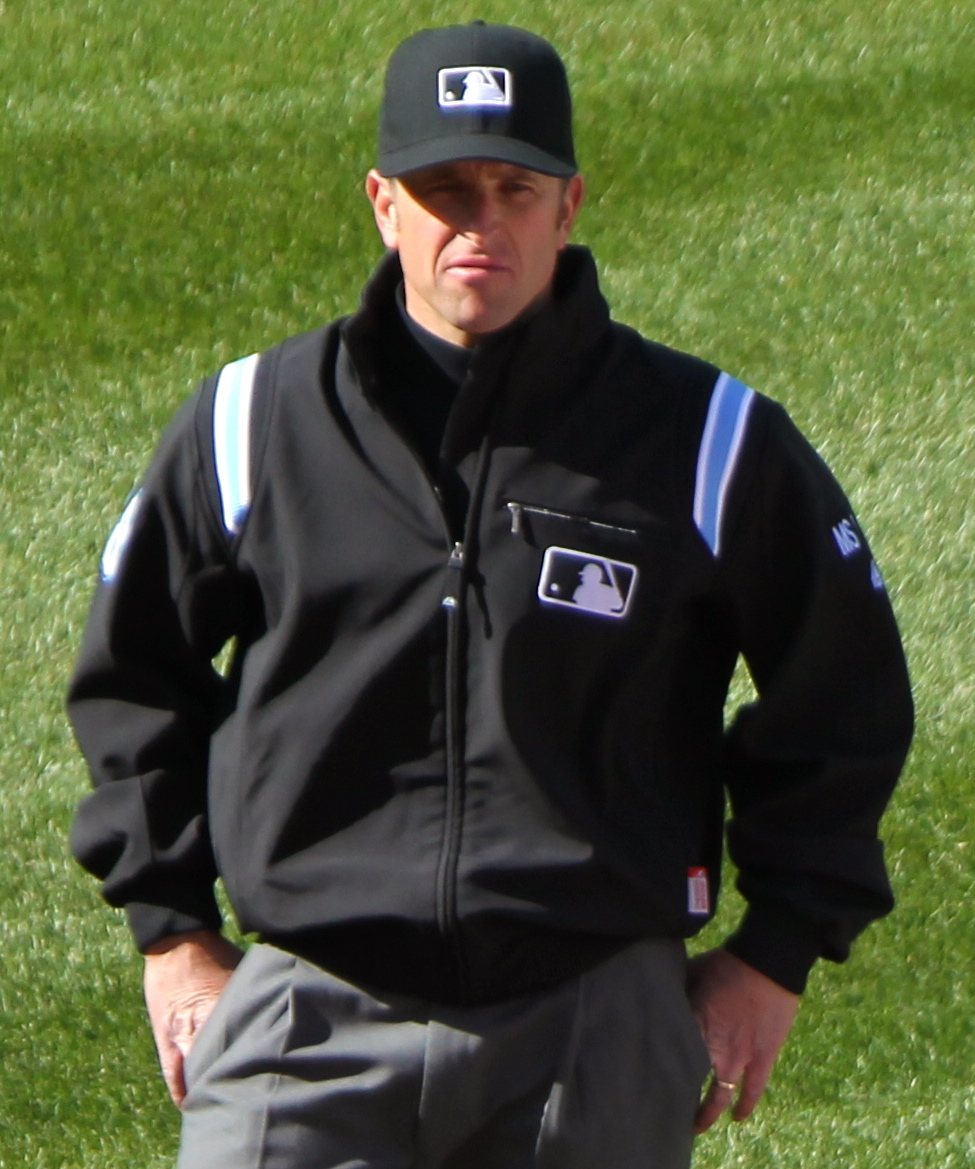
- Guccione in 2012

MLB – No. 68
- Umpire
- Born: June 24, 1974 (age 52); Salida, Colorado, U.S.

MLB debut
- April 25, 2000

Crew information
- Umpiring crew: N
- Crew members: #68 Chris Guccione (crew chief); #86 David Rackley; #33 Nestor Ceja; #50 Charlie Ramos

Career highlights and awards
- Special assignments: World Series (2016, 2020); League Championship Series (2012, 2017, 2018, 2019, 2022); Division Series (2010, 2011, 2013, 2014, 2015, 2016, 2020, 2023, 2025, 2026); Wild Card Games/Series (2012, 2017, 2018, 2019, 2020, 2022); All-Star Games (2011, 2021); World Baseball Classic (2006, 2013, 2023); Fort Bragg Game (2016); MLB Little League Classic (2018, 2021)

Christopher Gene Guccione (born June 24, 1974) is an American umpire in Major League Baseball. He wears number 68.

== Umpiring career ==
Began his umpiring career by attending the Jim Evans Academy of Professional Umpiring in 1995. Guccione has umpired in both the American League and National League since 2000, although he was not officially promoted to the full-time Major League staff until before the 2009 season. Guccione has 22 total years of professional umpiring experience, having worked in the Pioneer, Midwest, California, Texas and Pacific Coast leagues before reaching MLB. He also officiated in the 2006 World Baseball Classic. He was promoted to crew chief in 2024.

Guccione gained his first playoff experience in 2010, umpiring the 2010 American League Division Series between the New York Yankees and the Minnesota Twins. He has worked a total of ten Division Series (2010, 2011, 2013, 2014, 2015, 2016, 2020, 2023, 2025, 2026), five League Championship Series (2012, 2017, 2018, 2019, 2022) and two World Series (2016, 2020). According to an analysis done by the website FiveThirtyEight, he was the most accurate umpire in the major leagues in 2014 Major League Baseball season based on the number of unsuccessful manager challenges; 14 of his 15 calls that were challenged were upheld on video review.

=== Notable games ===
Guccione was chosen as the right field umpire for the 2011 All-Star Game. He was also chosen as one of the umpires for the one-game American League Wild Card Game playoff between the Baltimore Orioles and the Texas Rangers on October 5, 2012, and again for the National League Championship Series held later that month.

Guccione was the home plate umpire when 3,000-hit-club-member Miguel Cabrera got his first Major League hit, an 11th-inning walk-off homer for the Florida Marlins against the Tampa Bay Devil Rays on June 20, 2003.

Guccione was the first base umpire for Henderson Alvarez's no hitter on September 29, 2013.

Guccione worked his first World Series in 2016 and was the home plate umpire in Game 2.

During the 2018 Little League World Series, Guccione umpired two innings of an August 19 game between teams from Hawaii and Michigan.

Guccione was the third base umpire when Domingo German threw a perfect game on June 28, 2023, at Oakland Coliseum.

== Personal life ==
Guccione lives in the USA. He is of Italian descent.

== See also ==
- List of Major League Baseball umpires (disambiguation)
