= Sam Holbrook =

American baseball umpire (born 1965)

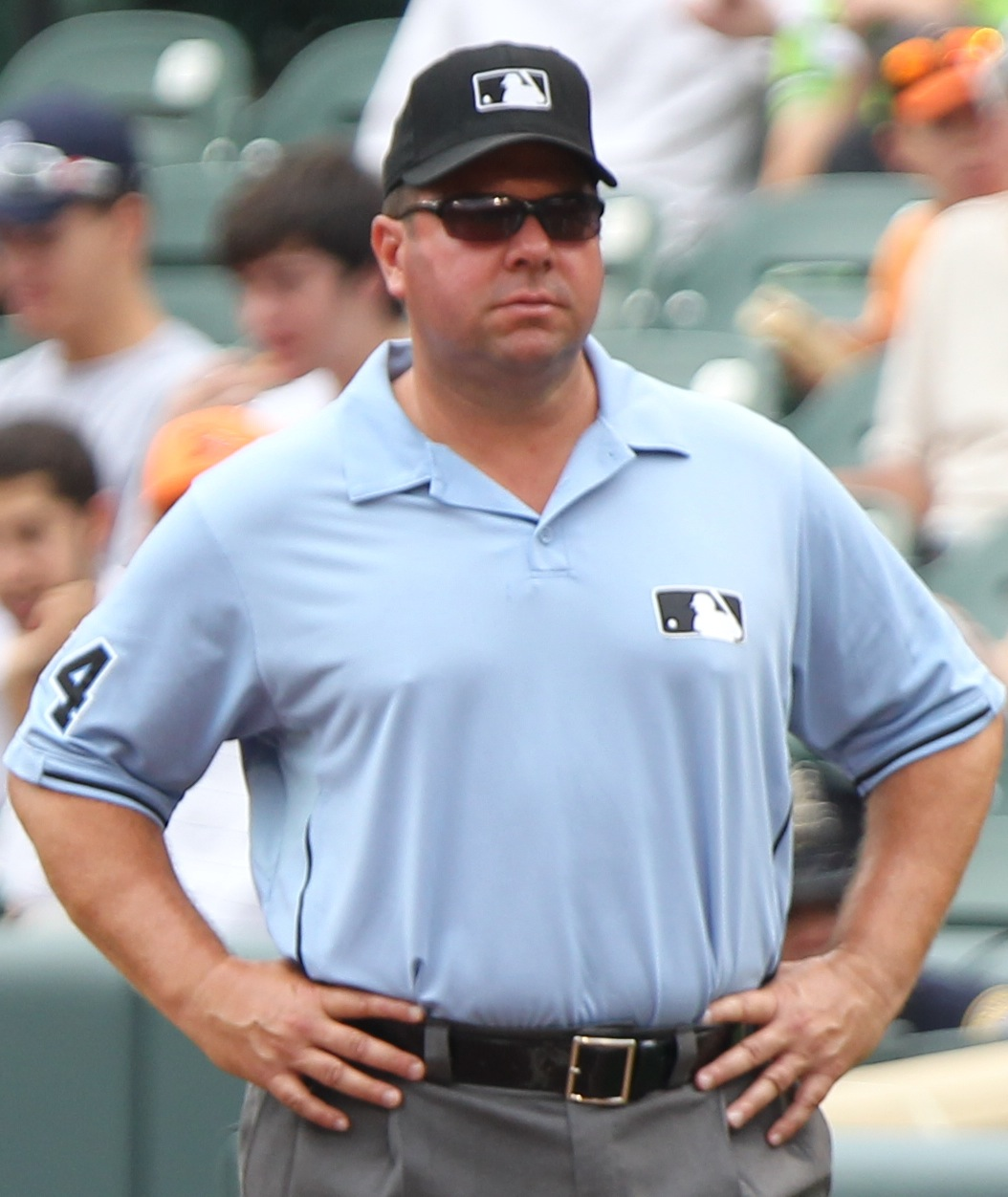
- Holbrook in 2011
- Born: July 7, 1965 (age 61); Morehead, Kentucky, U.S.

MLB debut
- June 26, 1996

Last appearance
- October 11, 2021

Career highlights and awards
- Special Assignments: 1 All-Star Game (2004); 1 Wild Card Game (2012); 6 Division Series (2005, 2007, 2010, 2013, 2019, 2021); 4 League Championship Series (2008, 2009, 2011, 2012); 3 World Series (2010, 2016, 2019)

Samuel Woodford Holbrook (born July 7, 1965) is an American retired Major League Baseball umpire. He made his MLB debut in 1996 and was promoted to crew chief in 2017. Holbrook worked the World Series in 2010, 2016, and 2019. He retired following the 2022 season.

== Umpiring career ==
Sam Holbrook began his umpiring career in the Appalachian League in 1990, followed by stints in the Midwest, Carolina, Texas, Eastern and International Leagues before making his Major League debut in June 1996. Holbrook worked the 1996 season in the American League, followed by three seasons in the National League. In 1999, he was one of 22 umpires whose resignations were accepted (in a failed union negotiating tactic), and was rehired in 2002, umpiring games in both Major Leagues since then. Following the death of his wife in 2014 he was placed on bereavement leave and did not umpire at all that season. Holbrook has umpired in six Division Series (2005, 2007, 2010, 2013, 2019, 2021), four League Championship Series (2008, 2009, 2011, 2012), and three World Series (2010, 2016, 2019). He also officiated the 2004 MLB All-Star Game. Holbrook was named a crew chief in February 2017 by MLB. He is joined on his 2017 crew by Greg Gibson, Jim Wolf and D.J. Reyburn. He retired following the end of the 2021 season.

=== Controversies ===
On August 29, 1998, in the first inning and first plate appearance of the day for first baseman Mark McGwire, rookie umpire Holbrook ejected both manager Tony La Russa and McGwire for arguing a called third strike. The game was halted for ten minutes and police were summoned as fans at Busch Stadium littered the field with trash and assorted knickknacks. Pitching coach Dave Duncan was also ejected after the Braves finished batting in the second inning. McGwire defended Holbrook, saying "I truly believe you guys shouldn't be having heat on the umpire. He has a job, I have a job, I crossed the line, I owe up to it. Period." La Russa did not agree, saying "I don't know if I'd have blamed (the fans). I'd have been hooting." Holbrook, in his first professional season as a full-time umpire, said "The farthest thing from my mind of what I wanted to do was eject Mark McGwire. I bent over backwards not to do so. I did everything I could to keep him in the game and he continued to argue. At some point I had to draw the line." Beer sales were cut off an inning early and security had to usher some fans out of the stadium. Fans again threw trash on the field at the end of the fifth inning after an awkward diving catch by Braves left fielder Ryan Klesko led to a double play. The next day during a pre-game ceremony to honor Cardinals Broadcaster Jack Buck, Buck said "Yesterday was one of the darkest days in Cardinals history." Buck also went on to say "When the men in blue take the field, I want you to welcome them with respect."

On July 7, 2012, in the first inning of a game between the Milwaukee Brewers and the Houston Astros, while umpiring at first base, Holbrook ejected Brewers starter Zack Greinke. Holbrook ruled Jose Altuve beat Greinke to the bag on a close play, prompting Greinke to throw the ball into the ground in frustration. Greinke was then ejected just four pitches into his start and Milwaukee manager Ron Roenicke was also thrown out by Holbrook shortly thereafter.

During the eighth inning of the 2012 National League Wild Card Playoff, Holbrook, acting as the umpire down the left field line, ruled that a popup in mid left field, 225 feet from home plate, hit by Atlanta Brave Andrelton Simmons was an out under the infield fly rule. The ball dropped between St. Louis Cardinals shortstop Pete Kozma and left fielder Matt Holliday just as Holbrook made his call. Without Holbrook's call, the Braves, down 6–3, would have had the bases loaded with one out. The Braves and the fans in attendance at Turner Field were upset over the call, and the game had to be delayed 19 minutes as fans threw garbage on the field in protest. Atlanta played the rest of the game under protest, which was denied by MLB Executive Vice President of Baseball Operations Joe Torre. Several commentators, including TBS studio analysts Ron Darling and Joe Simpson incorrectly argued that the location of the fly ball should have prohibited the umpire from citing an infield fly. MLB Network personality Harold Reynolds argued that the call was correct, employing instant replay to explain the call. Analysts supporting the call cited the Official Baseball Rules, which states, in part, that the fly ball's depth into the outfield is irrelevant in adjudicating this play. (Note: "On the infield fly rule the umpire is to rule whether the ball could ordinarily have been handled by an infielder—not by some arbitrary limitation such as the grass, or the base lines. The umpire must, in a timeframe that protects the runners and allows them to advance at their own risk, rule also that a ball is an infield fly, even if handled by an outfielder, if, in the umpire's judgment, the ball could have been as easily handled by an infielder.")

=== Notable games ===
Holbrook was the third base umpire when the Texas Rangers set the American League record for most runs scored in a game with 30 against the Baltimore Orioles on August 23, 2007.

Holbrook was the second base umpire for Félix Hernández's perfect game against the Tampa Bay Rays on August 15, 2012.

He was chosen as one of the umpires for the one-game Wild Card playoff between the Atlanta Braves and the St. Louis Cardinals on October 5, 2012, advancing to the 2012 American League Championship Series with the rest of the Wild Card umpires nearly one week later.

Holbrook was the home plate umpire for game 7 of the 2016 World Series between the Chicago Cubs and Cleveland Indians. The Cubs won the game 8–7 in 10 innings, also winning their first World Series in 108 years.

== Personal life ==
Holbrook received a B.S. and an M.S. from Eastern Kentucky University. He resides in Florida with his second wife, Sheri. Holbrook had two children, Adam and Amy, with his first wife Susie. After she died from cancer in February 2014, Holbrook spent the 2014 season on the bereavement list, returning to work Major League games in March 2015.

== See also ==
- List of Major League Baseball umpires (disambiguation)
