= Ronnier Mustelier =

Cuban baseball player (born 1984)

El Águila de Veracruz
- Manager
- Born: August 8, 1984 (age 42); Santiago de Cuba, Cuba
- Bats: Right Throws: Right
- Stats at Baseball Reference
Medals
Men's baseball
Representing Cuba
World Junior Baseball Championship
Gold medal – first place	2002 Sherbrooke	Team

Ronnier Mustelier Soler (born August 8, 1984) is a Cuban former professional baseball outfielder and third baseman who is currently the manager of El Águila de Veracruz of the Mexican League. He played in the Cuban National Series, and in Minor League Baseball within the New York Yankees and Atlanta Braves organizations. Listed at 5 feet 10 inches (1.78 m) and 210 pounds (95 kg) Mustelier threw and batted right-handed.

== Playing career ==
=== Cuba ===
Mustelier played for Santiago de Cuba in the Cuban National Series (CNS), until defecting from Cuba in 2009. In seven CNS seasons, he batted .295 with 42 home runs and 235 RBIs in 295 games played.

=== New York Yankees (minors) ===
The New York Yankees signed Mustelier in 2011, giving him a $50,000 signing bonus. In 2011 and 2012, he played for several teams in the Yankees' farm system, reaching Triple-A with the Scranton/Wilkes-Barre Yankees. With an injury to Curtis Granderson in spring training in 2013, Mustelier competed for a position with the Yankees, but remained in the minor leagues, batting .272 for Scranton/Wilkes-Barre during the season. The Yankees released Mustelier on May 7, 2014, citing a need to find at bats for other players.

=== Tigres de Quintana Roo ===
For the 2014 season, Mustelier signed with the Tigres de Quintana Roo of the Mexican League; he batted .270 for them in 39 games.

=== Vaqueros Laguna ===
In July 2014, he joined Vaqueros Laguna, also of the Mexican League, where he batted .429 in 38 games. During his time with the Vaqueros, Mustelier was suspended 50 games without pay due to his failure to pass an antidoping test along with him testing positive for a banned substance.

=== Atlanta Braves (minors) ===
Mustelier did not play in organized baseball during the 2015 season. He signed with the Atlanta Braves on a minor league contract in November 2015. In 2016, he played for the Gwinnett Braves of the Triple-A International League, appearing in 117 games while batting .291 with five home runs and 50 RBIs. Mustelier was promoted to the major leagues as the Braves' 26th man for the Fort Bragg Game on July 3 against the Miami Marlins, and returned to Gwinnett the next day, without making his major league debut. He was released by the Braves on March 30, 2017.

=== Leones de Yucatán ===
On April 18, 2017, Mustelier signed with the Leones de Yucatán of the Mexican League. With Yucatán, he played in 48 games while batting .318 with one home run and 22 RBIs. He was released on October 2, 2017. It was later revealed that Mustelier had been playing with the club as a naturalized Mexican citizen and not as a foreigner. However, after growing suspicion, an investigation was launched and it was discovered that Mustelier's passport was falsified. The Leones de Yucatán organization was forced to pay a $5 million peso (approximately US$250,000) fine for registering Mustelier's fake passport, and Mustelier was suspended for the rest of the season.

=== Olmecas de Tabasco ===
On March 15, 2018, Mustelier signed with the Olmecas de Tabasco of the Mexican League. Mustelier did not play in a game in 2020 due to the cancellation of the Mexican League season because of the COVID-19 pandemic. In 2021, Mustelier batted .268/.357/.338 with 2 home runs and 21 RBIs in 60 games. On January 4, 2022, Mustelier was released in order to make room for fellow Cuban infielder Lázaro Hernández on the Olmecas roster.

=== Tigres de Quintana Roo (second stint) ===
On January 23, 2022, Mustelier signed with the Tigres de Quintana Roo of the Mexican League. In 29 games, he batted .299/.381/.433 with 3 home runs and 13 RBIs. Mustelier was released on June 17, 2022.

== Post-playing career ==
On May 25, 2023, Mustelier became interim manager for the Tigres de Quintana Roo of the Mexican League following the dismissal of Jesse Garcia.

On May 30, 2024, Mustlier was named to manager of El Águila de Veracruz of the Mexican League.

== Personal ==
Mustelier has a son, Ronny Jr., who lives in Cuba.

== See also ==
- List of baseball players who defected from Cuba
- Phantom ballplayer
