= Major League Baseball tie-breaking procedures =

Procedures for breaking ties in the season-long standings of Major League Baseball

Major League Baseball tie-breaking procedures are used by Major League Baseball (MLB) to break ties between teams for qualification and seeding into the MLB postseason. The procedures in use since 2022, when a third wild card team and resulting Wild Card Series were added for both the American League and National League, are outlined below.

== Ties between two teams ==
=== Two-way tie for the division or wild-card ===
Previously, a one-game tiebreaker was played between teams tied for a division championship or a league's second wild-card berth. These games were played the day after the season was scheduled to end. Home-field advantage was determined using the rules listed below ("Breaking Ties Without Playoff Games").

From the implementation of the wild-card in 1994 to the end of the 2011 season, a different rule was in place. Two teams tied for a division did not play a tiebreaker if their records were better than all non-division winners in their league. Instead, said tie was broken using the rules listed below ("Breaking Ties Without Playoff Games"). This happened in 2001 Major League Baseball season when the Houston Astros (9–7 against STL) and St. Louis Cardinals (7–9 against HOU) tied for first in the National League Central with records of 93–69. In 2005, the New York Yankees (10–9 against BOS) and Boston Red Sox (9–10 against NYY) each finished 95–67 in the American League East. In 2006, the Los Angeles Dodgers (5–13 against SD) and the San Diego Padres (13–5 against LAD) were tied for the National League West and the National League Wild Card at 88–74. In this case, the rules below are used to determine the division winner. The team that had the better head-to-head record (the 2001 Astros, 2005 Yankees, and 2006 Padres) was the division champion, thus receiving a better seed in the postseason. The other team (the 2001 Cardinals, 2005 Red Sox, and 2006 Dodgers) was seeded as the wild card.

From 2012 to 2021, when the Wild Card Game was established as a second wild-card berth in each league, the non-division winner with the best record in the league faced possible elimination on the first day of the postseason. Consequently, the tie-breaking rules were changed so that two teams tied for a division championship had to play a tiebreaking game even if both teams had already qualified for the postseason. The team losing the tie-breaking game qualified for a wild-card berth only if its regular-season record was among the league's two best records for non-division-winners. If that team were tied for the second wild-card spot, a second tie-breaking game would have been played.

If, on the other hand, two teams had been tied for the first wild-card spot, no tie-breaking game would have been played. Rather, the two teams simply played against each other in the Wild Card game, with home-field advantage awarded using tie-breaking rules described in the next section.

Beginning with the 2022 season, a third wild-card berth per league was adopted (with the Wild Card Game becoming a Wild Card Series). Thus, the tiebreaker game format was eliminated, to compensate for the expanded (12-team) postseason.

=== Breaking ties without playoff games ===
Coin tosses or drawing of lots will be used if all criteria below fail.

1. The team with the better head-to-head winning percentage during the regular season
2. The team with the best overall record in intradivision games (This applies even if the teams are not in the same division.)
3. The team with the best overall record in intraleague games
4. The team with the best intraleague record in the last half of the season
5. Outcome of the previous intraleague game on the schedule, continue one game back until the tie is broken (Interleague games and games between any of the tied Clubs are skipped and ignored in this process.)

=== Ties between two division winners ===
If two champions from separate divisions have the same record, the tiebreaking procedure listed above is used to determine postseason seeding. No additional games are played.

== Ties among multiple teams ==
=== Playoff games for multiple-way ties ===
Tied teams are designated as A, B, C, and D. Choice for one of these designations is first given to the team winning the tie-breakers (listed below). While A is usually the "best" designation, there are some scenarios where C has a different path to the postseason. If a division title is up for grabs, then those divisional teams will select from the first designations (A, B,...).

On Day 1, A will host B and C will host D (if there is no fourth team, C will be considered to have won this game). Games on Day 2 may occur as follows:

1. If the teams are all competing for 1 playoff spot, then the A/B winner will host the C/D winner for that spot.
2. If 3 teams, not all tied for the same division lead, are competing for 2 playoff spots, C will host the A/B loser for the second spot.
3. If 4 teams were competing for 3 playoff spots, and two teams are competing for the division championship, then the A/B loser will play the C/D loser for the final wild-card spot. Home field will be determined by the rules for two way tiebreakers.
4. If 4 teams were competing for 3 playoff spots, and three teams are competing for the division championship, if D wins, then the A/B winner wins the division and Club D is a wild card, with the A/B loser then hosting C for the other wild card. If D loses, then the A/B winner hosts team C for the division, and the loser is a wild card, and the A/B loser hosts team D for the other wild card.
5. If 3 or 4 teams, tied for the same division's lead, both win on Day 1, then the A/B winner will host the C/D winner to determine the division title. The loser of this Day 2 game will earn a wild card spot. If four teams are competing for three spots, the A/B loser hosts the C/D loser for the a wild card.

=== Determining team designations ===
The order in which teams pick their designations (A, B, C, D) will be determined by the following 5-step tie-breaking system. If there is a tie for both wild card and division title spots, then the first designations will match teams competing for their division title.

1. Winning/Losing season series against each of the other tied teams (if the tie involves more than three teams, only winning is taken into account)
2. Winning percentage among all tied teams
3. Winning percentage in intradivision games
4. Winning percentage in the last half of intraleague play
5. If still tied, the next most recent intraleague game is added to this winning percentage until not all teams are tied.

If at any given step some, but not all, teams remain tied, then those teams that are still tied revert to Step 1.

Beginning in 2022, the rules are changed using 5 step tiebreaking procedure for multi-way ties without using team designation: If three teams do not all have identical records against one another, and Team X has a better record against all other teams, then Team X is the qualifier. If two or more teams have identical records against one another and each has a better record against the third or fourth team(s), then these two teams follow the two-club tiebreaker rules to determine the qualifier. Otherwise, they are ranked by their overall winning percentage against one another, and the club with the highest overall winning percentage is the qualifier. If two of the clubs have identical winning percentages in this scenario, then they would follow the two-club tiebreaker procedure.

If all teams have identical records against one another, then the team with the best intradivision record and intraconference (see below) is the qualifier.

Note: Division tiebreakers must be settled first in any scenario. Also, if at any given step some, but not all, teams remain tied, then those teams that are still tied revert to Step 1.

== History ==
During the 2024 season, Hurricane Helene postponed two games from a late September Braves/Mets series. With no other common off-days, these games were rescheduled for Monday, September 30, one day after the regular season was scheduled to end. Major League Baseball announced the games would not be played if the games did not have playoff implications. However, these games did have playoff implications, resulting in this doubleheader becoming a pseudo-tiebreaker. If either the Mets or the Braves won both games, that team would advance to the Wild Card Series along with the Diamondbacks. If the games were split, both the Braves and the Mets would make the playoffs. The Mets and Braves split the games, resulting in both teams advancing to the playoffs.

== Statistical tie-breaks ==
The following lists the statistics used to break tie-breaks. The team winning the tie-break is bolded. ꬸ indicates the team losing the tie-break missed the postseason.

| Year | Teams | Race | Tiebreak | Ref |
|---|---|---|---|---|
| 2000 | **Oakland Athletics (91–70)**; Seattle Mariners (91–71) | AL West champions (#2 seed in AL) | Athletics won season series against the Mariners (9–4) (Note: The Athletics had one game rained out. Because they would win a tie-breaker with the Mariners had they lost the game to drop to 91–71, the game was not rescheduled and the Athletics were awarded the division title.) | |
| 2000 | **St. Louis Cardinals (95–67)**; Atlanta Braves (95–67) | #2 seed in NL | Cardinals won season series against the Braves (4–3) | |
| 2001 | **Houston Astros (93–69)**; St. Louis Cardinals (93–69) | NL Central champions (#1 seed in NL) | Astros won season series against the Cardinals (9–7) | |
| 2004 | **Anaheim Angels (92–70)**; Minnesota Twins (92–70) | #2 seed in AL | Angels won season series against the Twins (5–4) | |
| 2005 | **Los Angeles Angels of Anaheim (95–67)**; **New York Yankees (95–67)**; Boston Red Sox (95–67) | AL East champions (Yankees and Red Sox only) | Yankees won season series against the Red Sox (10–9) | |
| 2005 | **Los Angeles Angels of Anaheim (95–67)**; **New York Yankees (95–67)**; Boston Red Sox (95–67) | #2 seed in AL | Angels won season series against the Yankees (6–4) | |
| 2006 | **San Diego Padres (88–74)**; Los Angeles Dodgers (88–74) | NL West champions (#2 seed in NL) | Padres won season series against the Dodgers (13–5) | |
| 2007 | **Boston Red Sox (96–66)**; Cleveland Indians (96–66) | #1 seed in AL (Note: This tie-breaker did not affect matchups in the Division Series, because of the rule banning two teams from the same division from facing each other in that round. However, it did affect home field advantage in the League Championship Series, in which the Red Sox hosted the Indians by virtue of winning this tie-breaker.) | Red Sox won season series against the Indians (5–2) | |
| 2012 | **Texas Rangers (93–69)**; Baltimore Orioles (93–69) | #4 seed in AL | Rangers won season series against the Orioles (5–2) | |
| 2014 | **Pittsburgh Pirates (88–74)**; San Francisco Giants (88–74) | #4 seed in NL | Pirates won season series against the Giants (4–2) | |
| 2016 | **Toronto Blue Jays (89–73)**; Baltimore Orioles (89–73) | #4 seed in AL | Blue Jays won season series against the Orioles (10–9) | |
| 2016 | **New York Mets (87–75)**; San Francisco Giants (87–75) | #4 seed in NL | Mets won season series against the Giants (4–3) | |
| 2020 | **Cleveland Indians (35–25)**; Chicago White Sox (35–25) | 2nd place in AL Central (#4 seed in AL) | Indians won season series against the White Sox (8–2) | |
| 2020 | **Milwaukee Brewers (29–31)**; ꬸ San Francisco Giants (29–31) | #8 seed in NL | Teams did not play Brewers had a better division record than the Giants (19–21 to 18–22) | |
| 2021 | **Boston Red Sox (92–70)**; New York Yankees (92–70) | #4 seed in AL | Red Sox won season series against the Yankees (10–9) | |
| 2022 | **Atlanta Braves (101–61)**; New York Mets (101–61) | NL East champions (#2 seed in NL) | Braves won season series against the Mets (10–9) | |
| 2023 | **Houston Astros (90–72)**; Texas Rangers (90–72) | AL West champions (#2 seed in AL) | Astros won season series against the Rangers (9–4) | |
| 2023 | **Miami Marlins (84–78)** (Note: At the time the postseason schedule was announced, the Marlins' record was listed as 84–77. The New York Mets were later awarded a win over the Marlins in a previously suspended game which reverted to the last completed inning, dropping the Marlins' record to 84–78.); Arizona Diamondbacks (84–78) | #5 seed in NL | Marlins won season series against the Diamondbacks (4–2) | |
| 2024 | **Atlanta Braves (89–73)**; **New York Mets (89–73)**; ꬸ Arizona Diamondbacks (89–73) | #5 and #6 seeds in NL | Braves won season series against the Mets (7–6) and Diamondbacks (5–2); Mets won season series against the Diamondbacks (4–3) (Note: With the Braves winning their head-to-head series against both the Mets and Diamondbacks, and the Mets winning their head-to-head series against the Diamondbacks, the overall head-to-head record between the three teams never came into play.) | |
| 2024 | **Kansas City Royals (86–76)**; Detroit Tigers (86–76) | #5 seed in AL | Royals won season series against the Tigers (7–6) | |
| 2025 | **Toronto Blue Jays (94–68)**; New York Yankees (94–68) | AL East champions (#1 seed in AL) | Blue Jays won season series against the Yankees (8–5) | |
| 2025 | **Detroit Tigers (87–75)**; ꬸ Houston Astros (87–75) | #6 seed in AL | Tigers won season series against the Astros (4–2) | |
| 2025 | **Cincinnati Reds (83–79)**; ꬸ New York Mets (83–79) | #6 seed in NL | Reds won season series against the Mets (4–2) | |

== See also ==
- List of Major League Baseball tie-breakers
