= Play-in game =

Qualification game for a tournament

A play-in game is a game, usually played at the beginning of a tournament or just prior to the tournament depending on how the tournament is defined. In a play-in, the lowest qualifiers or participants who have earned conditional qualification compete for qualification to the main portion of the tournament. This gives an added advantage to the higher or direct qualifiers, allowing them to rest or play non-elimination games, while the lower teams extend themselves by playing in elimination games. Further, teams that advance from a play-in must usually start the main tournament against the highest qualifier in the tournament and on the road. Having a play-in game allows for a tournament to have an odd number of teams without having to grant byes in the main tournament. It also gives extra incentives for most if not all teams to play for, as better performing teams that would otherwise directly qualify relatively quickly instead have to try to continue winning, whether for the right to play a play-in qualifier or to avoid having to play in the extra game(s), while teams that would otherwise be eliminated from qualification just as quickly instead remain in contention for at least a play-in berth.

== Conditional games ==
Certain competitions must satisfy certain conditions for a play-in game to be triggered:

- 2020 NBA play-in tournament
  - The ninth ranked team in the conference must be four games behind or less from the eighth seed for it to be triggered. The #9 seeded team then has to beat the #8 seeded team twice, while the #8 team only has to win once, to advance to the playoffs proper.
- Philippine Basketball Association (PBA)
  - The PBA ad hoc playoff games for the last finals berth in conferences that had a round-robin semifinal if a team wins a certan number of semifinal round games, but did not finish in the top 2 places. This format is not currently used.

== Nonconditional games ==
Other competitions always have play-in games regardless of team standings:

- MLB Wild Card (played since the 2012 season)
- NFL Wild Card games
- Wild Card games at the start of the major Canadian curling championships (Scotties Tournament of Hearts and Tim Hortons Brier, played since 2018)
- NCAA Division I men's basketball tournament "First Four"
- MLS Cup playoffs first round
- Indian Premier League playoffs eliminator
- NBA play-in tournament (since 2021)
- NBL play-in tournament
- Australia Cup: A-League teams are limited to 11 entrants in the round of 32. The first nine teams in the league qualify, with the last two places determined by two separate play-in games, held between 4th to last place against last place, then 2nd last and 3rd last against each other.
- NCAA (Philippines) play-in tournament
  - NCAA Season 97 seniors' basketball tournament, one-off play-in tournament during the COVID-19 pandemic in the Philippines
  - NCAA play-in round, for NCAA Season 101 onwards, on basketball, volleyball and esports tournaments
- Premier Volleyball League play-in tournament
  - 2024–25 Premier Volleyball League All-Filipino Conference, play-in round robin for last quarterfinals berths
  - 2026 Premier Volleyball League All-Filipino Conference, play-in stepladder for last semifinals berths
- League of Legends World Championship, 2 stage play-in before finals – group stage and knockout stage

== See also ==
- One-game playoff, an ad hoc game to break ties
