= Wild Card Series =

First round of the MLB postseason

The Wild Card Series (WCS; formerly known as the Wild Card Game (WCG) from 2012 to 2019 and in 2021) is the opening round of postseason play in Major League Baseball (MLB), featuring the American League Wild Card Series (ALWCS) and the National League Wild Card Series (NLWCS). A single wild card game was instituted in 2012. This became a best-of-three playoff wild card series in 2020 as a one-off, and became permanent (albeit with fewer teams playing than in the 2020 series) starting in the 2022 season.

The lowest-seeded division winner and three wild card teams in each league play in a best-of-three series after the end of the regular season. The winners of each league's wild card series advance to face the two-best division winners in that league's Division Series. This expansion of the postseason abolished any regular-season-extending tie-breaker games.

== Format ==
Under the format adopted in 2022, six teams in each league are assigned seeds for the postseason. In each league, the three division winners are seeded #1–3, per their relative winning percentages. The lowest-seeded division winner is automatically given the No. 3 seed even if one or all other wild-card teams has a better record. Also in each league, the three teams with the best winning percentages among non-division winning teams are wild cards, seeded #4–6, per their relative winning percentages. Any ties are broken using a set of MLB tie-breaking procedures; as such, no tie-breaking games (colloquially known as "Game 163") are contested.

The top two division winners in each league receive first-round byes to the Division Series. The remaining four teams, seeds No. 3 through No. 6, play in two best-of-3 wild card series, with the higher seed hosting all games. These two series are: No. 3 hosting No. 6, and No. 4 hosting No. 5.

In the Division Series, the winner of the No. 4 vs. No. 5 series faces the No. 1 seed, and the winner of the No. 3. vs. No. 6 series faces the No. 2 seed. The bracket structure in each league looks as follows:

Wild Card Series; Best-of-3
4	Wild Card team #1
5	Wild Card team #2
3	Lowest seeded-division winner
6	Wild Card team #3

Division Series; Best-of-5
1	Best record in league
2	Second-best division winner

League Championship Series; Best-of-7

== History ==
=== One wild-card team per league (1995–2011) ===
From 1969 through 1993, the division leaders in each league advanced to the League Championship Series, with the winners of each LCS meeting in the World Series. However, an expanding number of teams in MLB over the years made making the playoffs increasingly difficult. The new system was instituted in 1994 (but first used in 1995 because a players strike canceled the 1994 playoffs) when Major League Baseball expanded from two to three divisions per league. In the new three-division leagues, each league had four teams in the playoffs; in addition to the three division winners, the division runner-up with the best record received a wild-card spot. This assured that the team with the second-best record in its league would qualify for the postseason even if it was not a division champion.

Thus, a third postseason round was added, the Division Series. From 1995 to 1997, a yearly rotation was used to decide the match-ups in the Division Series, although the wild-card team was prevented from playing its own division's champion. Beginning in 1998, the team with the best record in the league would typically face the wild-card team and the other two division winners would play each other, with second-best division winner having home-field. However, if the division winner with the league's best record and the wild-card team came from the same division, the wild-card would face the second-best division winner in the league.

=== Wild Card Game (2012–2019, 2021) ===
The Wild Card round was initially introduced in 2012 as a single-game playoff between two wild-card teams in each league, with the winner advancing to play the top seed in the Division Series. With the adoption of MLB's new collective bargaining agreement in November 2011, baseball commissioner Bud Selig announced that a new playoff system would begin within the next two years; the change was ultimately put into place in 2012. This format was used through the 2019 season.

=== Wild Card Series (2020, 2022–present) ===
For the 2020 postseason, following a shortened 60-game regular season due to the COVID-19 pandemic, MLB held a one-off Wild Card Series with eight teams in each league, thus a total of 16 playoff teams. Division champions were seeded 1–3 by record, the second-place teams seeded 4–6 by record, and the two teams with the next-best records were seeded seventh and eighth. Matchups were contested as a best-of-three series rather than individual games.

MLB returned to the previous format of one Wild Card Game per league for the 2021 postseason. Starting with the 2022 postseason, MLB added a third wild card team in each league. In the current format of the Wild Card Series, the top two division winners in each league receive a bye to the Division Series, while the lowest-seeded division winner and three wild card teams play in this round. A best-of-three series takes place, with the higher seed hosting all three games. Due to the expansion of the postseason beginning in 2022, the regular season tie-breaker game format has been eliminated.

As of the beginning of the 2024 postseason, 29 of the 30 MLB franchises have reached the Wild Card round of the postseason (either a Wild Card Game or the Wild Card Series). The New York Yankees have the most appearances with seven, and have the most wins during the Wild Card round with four. The Milwaukee Brewers have the most losses during the Wild Card round, with four. The Los Angeles Angels are the only franchise that has never played in the Wild Card round, though they qualified for the postseason in 2002 as a wild-card team.

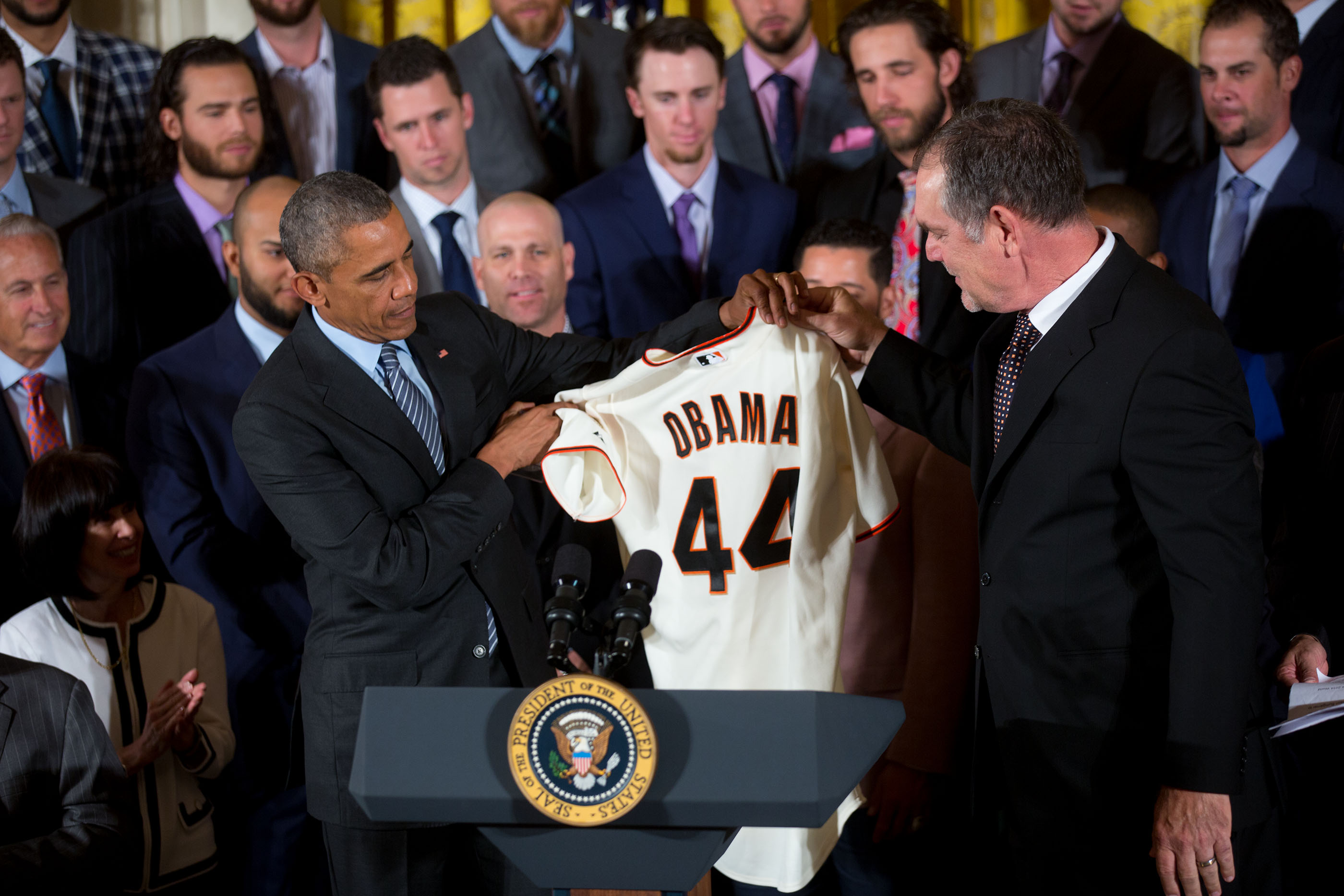
The 2014 San Francisco Giants won the National League Wild Card Game and went on to win that season's World Series.

=== Analysis ===
Through the 2021 postseason, Wild Card Game winners have gone on to compile an overall 9–9 record in League Division Series, with Wild Card Game winners going 4–5 in the ALDS and 5–4 in the NLDS. Two Wild Card Game winners have gone on to win the World Series (the 2014 Giants and the 2019 Nationals). The 2014 postseason featured the first series sweeps involving a Wild Card Game winner; both in favor of the AL Wild Card Kansas City Royals, who swept the Los Angeles Angels in the ALDS and the Baltimore Orioles in the ALCS. The Royals then met the San Francisco Giants in the 2014 World Series, the second all-Wild Card fall classic, which the Giants won in seven games. The first all-Wild Card World Series had also involved the Giants, who lost the 2002 World Series to the then-Anaheim Angels in seven games.

In the sixteen games played since the new Wild Card system began in 2012, five have been shutouts. In eight of the eleven others, the losing team scored three or fewer runs. There have only been two games in which the losing team scored more than six runs: the 2017 NL Wild Card Game in which the Arizona Diamondbacks defeated the Colorado Rockies by a score of 11–8; and the 2014 AL Wild Card Game which featured the Kansas City Royals beating the Oakland Athletics 9–8 in 12 innings. The margin of victory has been four runs or more in eight of the sixteen games played. Only three games have been decided by exactly one run: the 2014 Royals–Athletics game, the 2018 Rockies–Cubs game, and the 2019 Nationals–Brewers game.

== Results ==
=== Wild Card Game ===
Through the 2021 postseason, visiting teams and home teams have each won nine of the 18 games played. There have been five shutouts, each of which has been won by the visiting team, including three consecutive shutouts in the 2014–2016 NL editions. Two of the three extra innings games have been won by the home team. Three games have ended in walk-off victory for the home team, with the 2021 NL edition being the only one in regulation.

Key
bold	Wild Card Game winner
↓	Lost tie-breaker game to reach Wild Card Game (arrow links to game)
↑	Won tie-breaker game to reach Wild Card Game (arrow links to game)
	Reached League Championship Series
	Reached World Series
	Won World Series

==== American League Wild Card Game ====
Year	Visiting team	Manager	Score	Home team	Manager	Stadium
2012	Baltimore Orioles	Buck Showalter	5–1	Texas Rangers	Ron Washington	Rangers Ballpark in Arlington
2013	Tampa Bay Rays↑	Joe Maddon	4–0	Cleveland Indians	Terry Francona	Progressive Field
2014	Oakland Athletics	Bob Melvin	8–9 (12)	Kansas City Royals	Ned Yost	Kauffman Stadium
2015	Houston Astros	A. J. Hinch	3–0	New York Yankees	Joe Girardi	Yankee Stadium
2016	Baltimore Orioles	Buck Showalter	2–5 (11)	Toronto Blue Jays	John Gibbons	Rogers Centre
2017	Minnesota Twins	Paul Molitor	4–8	New York Yankees	Joe Girardi	Yankee Stadium
2018	Oakland Athletics	Bob Melvin	2–7	New York Yankees	Aaron Boone	Yankee Stadium
2019	Tampa Bay Rays	Kevin Cash	5–1	Oakland Athletics	Bob Melvin	Oakland Coliseum
2021	New York Yankees	Aaron Boone	2–6	Boston Red Sox	Alex Cora	Fenway Park

==== National League Wild Card Game ====
Year	Visiting team	Manager	Score	Home team	Manager	Stadium
2012	St. Louis Cardinals	Mike Matheny	6–3	Atlanta Braves	Fredi González	Turner Field
2013	Cincinnati Reds	Dusty Baker	2–6	Pittsburgh Pirates	Clint Hurdle	PNC Park
2014	San Francisco Giants	Bruce Bochy	8–0	Pittsburgh Pirates	Clint Hurdle	PNC Park
2015	Chicago Cubs	Joe Maddon	4–0	Pittsburgh Pirates	Clint Hurdle	PNC Park
2016	San Francisco Giants	Bruce Bochy	3–0	New York Mets	Terry Collins	Citi Field
2017	Colorado Rockies	Bud Black	8–11	Arizona Diamondbacks	Torey Lovullo	Chase Field
2018	Colorado Rockies↓	Bud Black	2–1 (13)	Chicago Cubs↓	Joe Maddon	Wrigley Field
2019	Milwaukee Brewers	Craig Counsell	3–4	Washington Nationals	Dave Martinez	Nationals Park
2021	St. Louis Cardinals	Mike Shildt	1–3	Los Angeles Dodgers	Dave Roberts	Dodger Stadium

=== Wild Card Series ===
Through 2026, 20 of 28 Wild Card Series have ended in a sweep. Higher-seeded teams have won 15 of 28 total series, and lower-seeded teams have won 13.

Key
^{E1} ^{C1} ^{W1}	Division winners for East, Central, West
^{E2} ^{C2} ^{W2}	Division runners-up for East, Central, West
^{WC}	Wild card teams
bold	Wild Card Series winner

==== American League Wild Card Series ====
Year	Visiting team	Manager	Series	Home team	Manager	Stadium
2020	Toronto Blue Jays^{WC2}	Charlie Montoyo	0–2	Tampa Bay Rays^{E1}	Kevin Cash	Tropicana Field
2020	Chicago White Sox^{WC1}	Rick Renteria	1–2	Oakland Athletics^{W1}	Bob Melvin	Oakland Coliseum
2020	Houston Astros^{W2}	Dusty Baker	2–0	Minnesota Twins^{C1}	Rocco Baldelli	Target Field
2020	New York Yankees^{E2}	Aaron Boone	2–0	Cleveland Indians^{C2}	Sandy Alomar Jr. (Note: In 2020, Alomar was designated as Cleveland's interim manager in lieu of Terry Francona who missed the postseason due to health concerns.)	Progressive Field
2022	Tampa Bay Rays^{WC3}	Kevin Cash	0–2	Cleveland Guardians^{C1}	Terry Francona	Progressive Field
2022	Seattle Mariners^{WC2}	Scott Servais	2–0	Toronto Blue Jays^{WC1}	John Schneider	Rogers Centre
2023	Toronto Blue Jays^{WC3}	John Schneider	0–2	Minnesota Twins^{C1}	Rocco Baldelli	Target Field
2023	Texas Rangers^{WC2}	Bruce Bochy	2–0	Tampa Bay Rays^{WC1}	Kevin Cash	Tropicana Field
2024	Detroit Tigers^{WC3}	A. J. Hinch	2–0	Houston Astros^{W1}	Joe Espada	Minute Maid Park
2024	Kansas City Royals^{WC2}	Matt Quatraro	2–0	Baltimore Orioles^{WC1}	Brandon Hyde	Oriole Park at Camden Yards
2025	Detroit Tigers^{WC3}	A. J. Hinch	2–1	Cleveland Guardians^{C1}	Stephen Vogt	Progressive Field
2025	Boston Red Sox^{WC2}	Alex Cora	1–2	New York Yankees^{WC1}	Aaron Boone	Yankee Stadium
2026	Chicago White Sox^{WC3}	Will Venable	2–0	Houston Astros^{W1}	Joe Espada	Daikin Park
2026	Boston Red Sox^{WC2}	Chad Tracy	0–2	New York Yankees^{WC1}	Aaron Boone	Yankee Stadium

==== National League Wild Card Series ====
Year	Visiting team	Manager	Series	Home team	Manager	Stadium
2020	Milwaukee Brewers^{WC2}	Craig Counsell	0–2	Los Angeles Dodgers^{W1}	Dave Roberts	Dodger Stadium
2020	Cincinnati Reds^{WC1}	David Bell	0–2	Atlanta Braves^{E1}	Brian Snitker	Truist Park
2020	Miami Marlins^{E2}	Don Mattingly	2–0	Chicago Cubs^{C1}	David Ross	Wrigley Field
2020	St. Louis Cardinals^{C2}	Mike Shildt	1–2	San Diego Padres^{W2}	Jayce Tingler	Petco Park
2022	Philadelphia Phillies^{WC3}	Rob Thomson	2–0	St. Louis Cardinals ^{C1}	Oliver Marmol	Busch Stadium
2022	San Diego Padres^{WC2}	Bob Melvin	2–1	New York Mets^{WC1}	Buck Showalter	Citi Field
2023	Arizona Diamondbacks^{WC3}	Torey Lovullo	2–0	Milwaukee Brewers^{C1}	Craig Counsell	American Family Field
2023	Miami Marlins^{WC2}	Skip Schumaker	0–2	Philadelphia Phillies^{WC1}	Rob Thomson	Citizens Bank Park
2024	New York Mets^{WC3}	Carlos Mendoza	2–1	Milwaukee Brewers^{C1}	Pat Murphy	American Family Field
2024	Atlanta Braves^{WC2}	Brian Snitker	0–2	San Diego Padres^{WC1}	Mike Shildt	Petco Park
2025	Cincinnati Reds^{WC3}	Terry Francona	0–2	Los Angeles Dodgers^{W1}	Dave Roberts	Dodger Stadium
2025	San Diego Padres^{WC2}	Mike Shildt	1–2	Chicago Cubs^{WC1}	Craig Counsell	Wrigley Field
2026	Philadelphia Phillies^{WC3}	Don Mattingly	1–2	Atlanta Braves^{E1}	Walt Weiss	Truist Park
2026	Chicago Cubs^{WC2}	Craig Counsell	0–2	San Diego Padres^{WC1}	Craig Stammen	Petco Park

== Appearances by team ==
In the sortable tables below, teams are ordered first by number of wins, then by number of appearances, and finally by year of first appearance. These records reflect series outcomes of the 2020 Wild Card Series, not individual games. In the "Season(s)" column, bold years indicate winning appearances.

=== American League ===
Apps	Team	Wins	Losses	Win %	Season(s)
7	New York Yankees	5	2	.714	2015, 2017, 2018, 2020, 2021, 2025, 2026
5	Tampa Bay Rays	3	2	.600	2013, 2019, 2020, 2022, 2023
4	Houston Astros	2	2	.500	2015, 2020, 2024, 2026
2	Kansas City Royals	2	0	1.000	2014, 2024
2	Detroit Tigers	2	0	1.000	2024, 2025
4	Athletics	1	3	.250	2014, 2018, 2019, 2020
4	Toronto Blue Jays	1	3	.250	2016, 2020, 2022, 2023
4	Cleveland Guardians	1	3	.250	2013, 2020, 2022, 2025
3	Minnesota Twins	1	2	.333	2017, 2020, 2023
3	Baltimore Orioles	1	2	.333	2012, 2016, 2024
3	Boston Red Sox	1	2	.333	2021, 2025, 2026
2	Texas Rangers	1	1	.500	2012, 2023
2	Chicago White Sox	1	1	.500	2020, 2026
1	Seattle Mariners	1	0	1.000	2022

=== National League ===
Apps	Team	Wins	Losses	Win %	Season(s)
5	San Diego Padres	4	1	.800	2020, 2022, 2024, 2025, 2026
3	Los Angeles Dodgers	3	0	1.000	2020, 2021, 2025
2	San Francisco Giants	2	0	1.000	2014, 2016
2	Arizona Diamondbacks	2	0	1.000	2017, 2023
3	Philadelphia Phillies	2	1	.667	2022, 2023, 2026
4	Atlanta Braves	2	2	.500	2012, 2020, 2024, 2026
5	Chicago Cubs	2	3	.400	2015, 2018, 2020, 2025, 2026
4	St. Louis Cardinals	1	3	.250	2012, 2020, 2021, 2022
3	Pittsburgh Pirates	1	2	.333	2013, 2014, 2015
3	New York Mets	1	2	.333	2016, 2022, 2024
2	Colorado Rockies	1	1	.500	2017, 2018
2	Miami Marlins	1	1	.500	2020, 2023
1	Washington Nationals	1	0	1.000	2019
3	Cincinnati Reds	0	3	.000	2013, 2020, 2025
4	Milwaukee Brewers	0	4	.000	2019, 2020, 2023, 2024

== Game results by team ==
Updated through the 2026 postseason. These records reflect individual game results of the 2020 Wild Card Series.

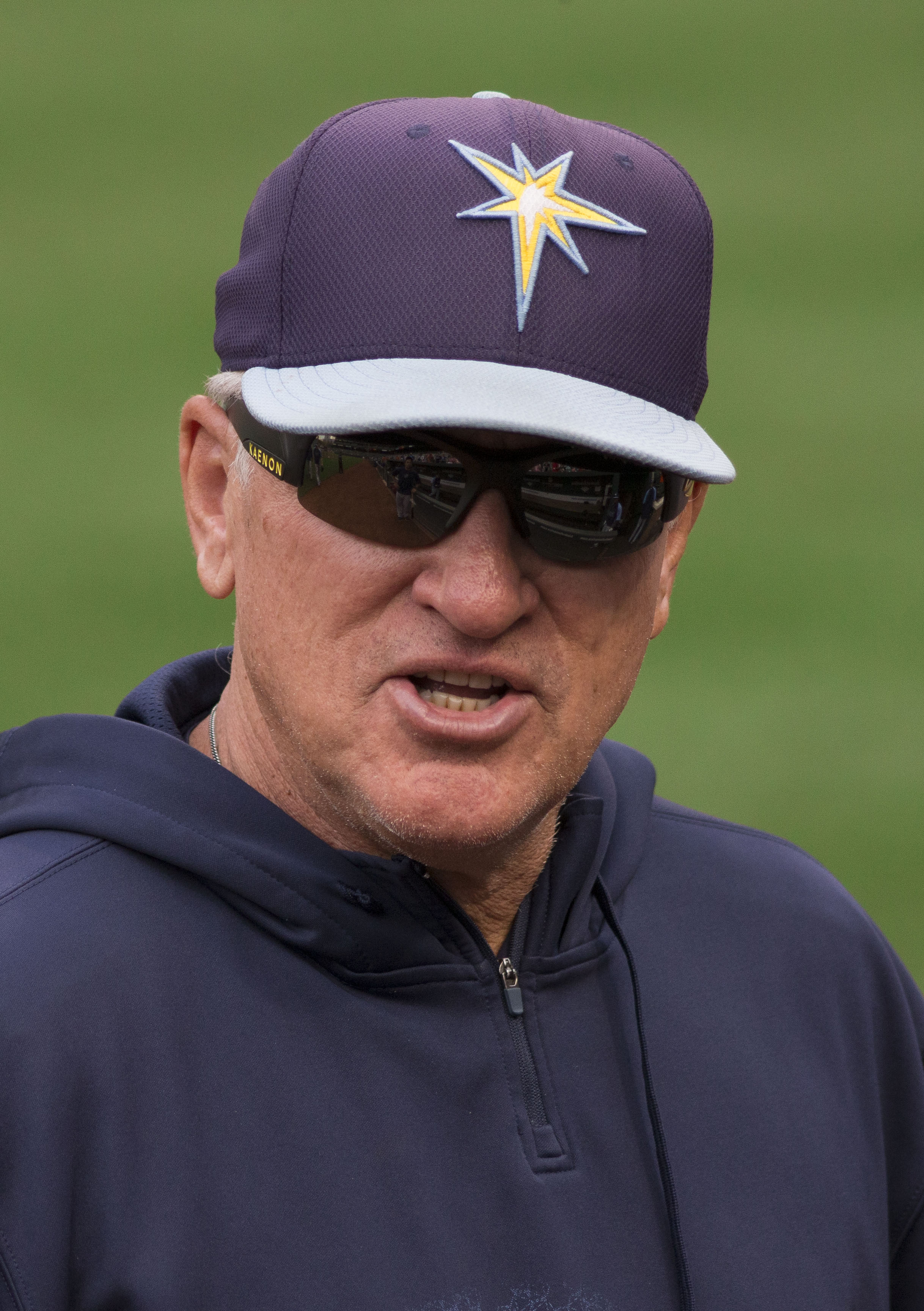
Joe Maddon has managed both the Tampa Bay Rays and Chicago Cubs to Wild Card Game victories.

Team	League	Appearances		Individual games	
Team	League	Games	Series	Win–loss record	Winning pct.
Arizona Diamondbacks	NL	1	1	3–0	1.000
Atlanta Braves	NL	1	3	4–4	.500
Baltimore Orioles	AL	2	1	1–3	.250
Boston Red Sox	AL	1	2	2–4	.333
Cincinnati Reds	NL	1	2	0–5	.000
Chicago Cubs	NL	2	3	3–6	.333
Chicago White Sox	AL	0	2	3–2	.600
Cleveland Guardians	AL	1	3	3–5	.375
Colorado Rockies	NL	2	0	1–1	.500
Detroit Tigers	AL	0	2	4–1	.800
Houston Astros	AL	1	3	3–4	.429
Kansas City Royals	AL	1	1	3–0	1.000
Los Angeles Dodgers	NL	1	2	5–0	1.000
Miami Marlins	NL	0	2	2–2	.500
Milwaukee Brewers	NL	1	3	1–7	.125
Minnesota Twins	AL	1	2	2–3	.400
New York Mets	NL	1	2	3–4	.429
New York Yankees	AL	4	3	8–3	.727
Athletics	AL	3	1	2–4	.333
Philadelphia Phillies	NL	0	3	5–2	.714
Pittsburgh Pirates	NL	3	0	1–2	.333
San Diego Padres	NL	0	5	9–4	.692
San Francisco Giants	NL	2	0	2–0	1.000
Seattle Mariners	AL	0	1	2–0	1.000
St. Louis Cardinals	NL	2	2	2–5	.286
Tampa Bay Rays	AL	2	3	4–4	.500
Texas Rangers	AL	1	1	2–1	.667
Toronto Blue Jays	AL	1	2	1–4	.200
Washington Nationals	NL	1	0	1–0	1.000

The following current MLB teams have not yet appeared in a Wild Card playoff:

American League: Los Angeles Angels

== Frequent matchups ==
=== American League ===
Count	Matchup	Record	Years
3	Boston Red Sox vs. New York Yankees	Yankees, 2–1	2021, 2025, 2026
2	Cleveland Guardians vs. Tampa Bay Rays	Tied, 1–1	2013, 2022

=== National League ===
Count	Matchup	Record	Years
2	Chicago Cubs vs. San Diego Padres	Tied, 1–1	2025, 2026

== Records ==
Single team

- Most runs scored: 12, New York Yankees vs. Cleveland Indians, Game 1 of the 2020 ALWC
- Most hits: 17, Arizona Diamondbacks vs. Colorado Rockies, 2017 NLWC

Both teams

- Most runs scored: 20, St. Louis Cardinals (9) vs. San Diego Padres (11), Game 1 of the 2020 NLWC
- Most hits: 30, Colorado Rockies (13) vs. Arizona Diamondbacks (17), 2017 NLWC

Other

- Largest run differential: 9, New York Yankees (12) vs. Cleveland Indians (3), Game 1 of the 2020 ALWC
- Longest game, by time: 297 minutes (4:57), Tampa Bay Rays vs. Cleveland Guardians, Game 2 of the 2022 ALWCS
- Longest game, by innings: 15, Tampa Bay Rays vs. Cleveland Guardians, Game 2 of the 2022 ALWCS

== See also ==
- List of Major League Baseball Wild Card Round broadcasters
