= 2016 San Diego Padres season =

2016 San Diego Padres
- League: National League
- Division: West
- Ballpark: Petco Park
- City: San Diego, California
- Record: 68–94 (.420)
- Divisional place: 5th
- Owners: Ron Fowler
- General managers: A. J. Preller
- Managers: Andy Green
- Television: Fox Sports San Diego (Dick Enberg, Mark Grant, Don Orsillo, Mike Pomeranz, Mark Sweeney, Jesse Agler); Cablemas (Spanish)
- Radio: XEPRS-AM ("The Mighty 1090") (Ted Leitner, Don Orsillo, Jesse Agler); XEMO-AM (Spanish) (Eduardo Otega, Carlos Hernandez, Pedro Gutierrez)

The 2016 San Diego Padres season was their 48th season in MLB, and their 12th at Petco Park. The Padres finished with a record of 68 win and 94 losses, and spent most of the season trading with the Arizona Diamondbacks for the last-place spot in the National League West. The Padres set multiple records for offensive futility, becoming the first team in MLB history to fail to score a run in their opening series, being outscored 25-0 in their first three games to the Los Angeles Dodgers. They also set the record for most times shutout in their first ten games (5), as well as the largest opening day shutout loss at home in MLB history (15-0 against the Los Angeles Dodgers). The Padres also hosted the All-Star Game on July 12.

== Offseason ==
- November 2: Josh Johnson, Shawn Kelley, Ian Kennedy, Brandon Morrow, Bud Norris and Justin Upton all elect free agency.
- November 3: Clint Barmes elects free agency. Joaquín Benoit gets his option picked up.
- November 4: Cory Luebke elects free agency. Padres sent Cory Decker outright to Triple-A El Paso.
- November 11: Yankees traded 2B Jose Pirela to Padres for RHP Ronald Herrera.
- November 12: Padres traded Joaquín Benoit to Mariners for RHP Enyal De Los Santos and SS Nelson Ward.
- November 13: Padres traded Craig Kimbrel to Red Sox for 3B Carlos Asuaje, SS Javier Guerra, LHP Logan Allen, and CF Manuel Margot.
- November 20: Padres claimed Josmil Pinto off waivers from Minnesota. Agreed to terms with César Vargas on a one-year contract. Selected the contracts of Manuel Margot from Portland and José Rondón from San Antonio.
- December 3: Named Mark McGwire bench coach, Alan Zinter hitting coach, Tarrik Brock first base coach, Doug Bochtler bullpen coach and Eddie Rodríguez assistant coach. Signed Brett Wallace to a one-year contract. Did not tender a 2016 contract to Rocky Gale, Frank Garces and Will Middlebrooks.
- December 10: Acquired Jabari Blash from Oakland to complete an earlier trade. Acquired Christian Bethancourt from Atlanta for Casey Kelly and Ricardo Rodriguez.
- December 21: Agreed to terms with Buddy Baumann on a one-year contract. Designated Josmil Pinto for assignment.
- January 9: Selected the contract of Ryan Buchter from El Paso.
- January 15: Agreed to terms with Carlos Villanueva, Derek Norris, Andrew Cashner, Alexei Ramírez, Tyson Ross and Drew Pomeranz to one-year contracts. Selected the contract of Ryan Buchter to the 40-man roster. Designated Rymer Liriano for assignment.
- January 29: Traded Rymer Liriano to Milwaukee for Trevor Seidenberger.
- February 2: Agreed to terms with Brandon Morrow on a minor league contract.
- February 4: Agreed to terms with Fernando Rodney on a one-year contract. Traded Odrisamer Despaigne to Baltimore for Jean Cosme.
- February 2: Agreed to terms with Skip Schumaker on a minor league contract.
- March 2–18: Agreed to terms with Matt Thornton, Mike Olt, Christian Friedrich, Angel Acevedo and Janigson Villalobos on minor league contracts.
- March 29: Acquired Dan Straily from Houston for Erik Kratz. Reassigned Jose Dominguez, Philip Humber and Daniel McCutchen and Rocky Gale to their minor league camp.

== Season standings ==
=== National League West ===
NL West
Team	W	L	Pct.	GB	Home	Road
Los Angeles Dodgers	91	71	.562	—	53‍–‍28	38‍–‍43
San Francisco Giants	87	75	.537	4	45‍–‍36	42‍–‍39
Colorado Rockies	75	87	.463	16	42‍–‍39	33‍–‍48
Arizona Diamondbacks	69	93	.426	22	33‍–‍48	36‍–‍45
San Diego Padres	68	94	.420	23	39‍–‍42	29‍–‍52

=== National League Wildcard ===
Division leaders
Team	W	L	Pct.
Chicago Cubs	103	58	.640
Washington Nationals	95	67	.586
Los Angeles Dodgers	91	71	.562

Wild Card teams (Top 2 teams qualify for postseason)
Team	W	L	Pct.	GB
New York Mets	87	75	.537	—
San Francisco Giants	87	75	.537	—
St. Louis Cardinals	86	76	.531	1
Miami Marlins	79	82	.491	7½
Pittsburgh Pirates	78	83	.484	8½
Colorado Rockies	75	87	.463	12
Milwaukee Brewers	73	89	.451	14
Philadelphia Phillies	71	91	.438	16
Arizona Diamondbacks	69	93	.426	18
Atlanta Braves	68	93	.422	18½
San Diego Padres	68	94	.420	19
Cincinnati Reds	68	94	.420	19

=== Record vs. opponents ===
2016 National League record Source: MLB Standings Grid – 2016
Team	AZ	ATL	CHC	CIN	COL	LAD	MIA	MIL	NYM	PHI	PIT	SD	SF	STL	WSH	AL
Arizona	—	5–2	2–5	3–3	10–9	7–12	2–4	3–4	5–1	4–3	1–5	10–9	6–13	4–3	2–5	5–15
Atlanta	2–5	—	3–3	3–4	1–6	1–5	11–7	2–5	10–9	11–8	3–4	4–2	3–4	2–4	4–15	8–12
Chicago	5–2	3–3	—	15–4	2–4	4–3	4–3	11–8	2–5	5–1	14–4	4–2	4–3	10–9	5–2	15–5
Cincinnati	3–3	4–3	4–15	—	5–2	2–5	3–4	11–8	0–6	4–2	9–10	3–4	3–3	9–10	3–4	5–15
Colorado	9–10	6–1	4–2	2–5	—	7–12	2–5	1–5	6–1	2–5	2–5	10–9	9–10	2–4	4–2	9–11
Los Angeles	12–7	5–1	3–4	5–2	12–7	—	1–6	5–2	4–3	4–2	2–5	11–8	8–11	4–2	5–1	10–10
Miami	4–2	7–11	3–4	4–3	5–2	6–1	—	4–2	7–12	9–10	6–1	3–3	2–4	4–3	9–10	6–14
Milwaukee	4–3	5–2	8–11	8–11	5–1	2–5	2–4	—	2–5	3–4	9–10	3–4	1–5	6–13	4–2	11–9
New York	1–5	9–10	5–2	6–0	1–6	3–4	12–7	5–2	—	12–7	3–3	4–3	4–3	3–3	7–12	12–8
Philadelphia	3–4	8–11	1–5	2–4	5–2	2–4	10–9	4–3	7–12	—	3–4	5–2	3–3	2–5	5–14	11–9
Pittsburgh	5–1	4–3	4–14	10–9	5–2	5–2	1–6	10–9	3–3	4–3	—	3–3	4–3	9–10	2–4	9–11
San Diego	9–10	2–4	2–4	4–3	9–10	8–11	3–3	4–3	3–4	2–5	3–3	—	8–11	1–6	4–3	6–14
San Francisco	13–6	4–3	3–4	3–3	10–9	11–8	4–2	5–1	3–4	3–3	3–4	11–8	—	3–4	3–4	8–12
St. Louis	3–4	4–2	9–10	10–9	4–2	2–4	3–4	13–6	3–3	5–2	10–9	6–1	4–3	—	2–5	8–12
Washington	5–2	15–4	2–5	4–3	2–4	1–5	10–9	2–4	12–7	14–5	4–2	3–4	4–3	5–2	—	12–8

=== Regular season ===
Team	Home	Away	Total	Win %	Gms Left	RS	RA
National League East
Atlanta Braves	2–1	0–3	2–4	.333	0	23	33
Miami Marlins	1–2	2–1	3–3	.500	0	22	29
New York Mets	2–2	1–2	3–4	.429	0	24	27
Philadelphia Phillies	1–2	1–3	2–5	.286	0	23	29
Washington Nationals	2–2	2–1	4–3	.571	0	40	33
	8–9	6–10	14–19	.424	0	132	151
National League Central
Chicago Cubs	0–3	2–1	2–4	.333	0	22	28
Cincinnati Reds	1–2	3–1	4–3	.571	0	27	21
Milwaukee Brewers	2–1	2–2	4–3	.571	0	34	20
Pittsburgh Pirates	2–1	1–2	3–3	.500	0	22	27
St. Louis Cardinals	1–2	0–4	1–6	.143	0	22	43
	6–9	8–10	14–19	.424	0	127	139
National League West
Arizona Diamondbacks	6–4	3–6	9–10	.474	0	102	86
Colorado Rockies	6–4	3–6	9–10	.474	0	95	79
Los Angeles Dodgers	4–5	4–6	8–11	.421	0	67	92
San Francisco Giants	5–5	3–6	8–11	.421	0	68	73
	21–18	13–24	34–42	.447	0	332	330
American League
Baltimore Orioles	0–2	1–1	1–3	.250	0	25	37
Boston Red Sox	1–2	N/A	1–2	.333	0	5	13
New York Yankees	2–1	N/A	2–1	.667	0	12	13
Seattle Mariners	1–1	0–2	1–3	.250	0	34	47
Tampa Bay Rays	N/A	0–3	0–3	.000	0	3	25
Toronto Blue Jays	N/A	1–2	1–2	.333	0	16	15
	4–6	2–8	6–14	.300	0	95	150
Season Total	39–42	29–52	68–94	.420	0	686	770

== Season summary ==
- Most Runs Scored in a game: 16 (4/9 at COL)
- Most Runs Allowed in a game: 16 (2 times)
- Longest Winning Streak: 3 games (6 times)
- Longest Losing Streak: 5 games (2 times)
- Longest Game (Innings): 17 (5/22 vs. LAD)
- Times Shutout by Opponent: 15
- Times Opponent Shutout: 9
- Walkoff Wins: 8
- Walkoff Losses: 8

== Home attendance ==
Year	Attendance (games)	AVG/game	NL Rank	W-L
2016	2,351,422 (81)	29,030	8th of 15	39–42
2015	2,459,752 (81)	30,367	10th of 15	39–42
2014	2,195,373 (81)	27,103	12th of 15	48–33
2013	2,166,691 (81)	26,749	12th of 15	45–36

Highest Home Attendance: 4/4 vs. LAD (44,317)
Lowest Home Attendance: 5/2 vs. COL (19,013)

== Game log ==
Legend
	Padres win
	Padres loss
	Postponement
**Bold**	Padres team member

2016 San Diego Padres Game Log: 68–94 (Home: 39–42; Road: 29–52)
April: 9–15 (Home: 4–8; Road: 5–7)

#	Date	Opponent	Score	Win	Loss	Save	Attendance	Record	Streak
1	April 4	Dodgers	0–15	Kershaw (1–0)	**Ross** (0–1)	—	44,317	0–1	L1
2	April 5	Dodgers	0–3	Kazmir (1–0)	**Shields** (0–1)	Jansen (1)	28,329	0–2	L2
3	April 6	Dodgers	0–7	Maeda (1–0)	**Cashner** (0–1)	—	30,054	0–3	L3
4	April 8	@ Rockies	13–6	**Erlin** (1–0)	Lyles (0–1)	—	49,630	1–3	W1
5	April 9	@ Rockies	16–3	**Pomeranz** (1–0)	De la Rosa (0–1)	—	35,177	2–3	W2
6	April 10	@ Rockies	3–6	Bettis (1–0)	**Shields** (0–2)	McGee (2)	27,587	2–4	L1
7	April 11	@ Phillies	4–3	**Quackenbush** (1–0)	Nola (0–1)	**Rodney** (1)	45,229	3–4	W1
8	April 12	@ Phillies	0–3	Morton (1–1)	**Erlin** (1–1)	Gómez (3)	21,043	3–5	L1
9	April 13	@ Phillies	1–2	Eickhoff (1–1)	**Rea** (0–1)	Gómez (4)	17,638	3–6	L2
10	April 14	@ Phillies	0–3	Velasquez (2–0)	**Pomeranz** (1–1)	—	18,079	3–7	L3
11	April 15	D-backs	2–3	Hudson (1–0)	**Rodney** (0–1)	Brad Ziegler (2)	28,955	3–8	L4
12	April 16	D-backs	5–3 (14)	**Perdomo** (1–0)	De La Rosa (0–3)	—	34,051	4–8	W1
13	April 17	D-backs	3–7	Corbin (1–1)	**Erlin** (1–2)	—	30,520	4–9	L1
14	April 19	Pirates	5–4	**Rea** (1–1)	Liriano (1–1)	**Rodney** (2)	19,449	5–9	W1
15	April 20	Pirates	8–2	**Pomeranz** (2–1)	Locke (0–2)	—	20,681	6–9	W2
16	April 21	Pirates	1–11	Cole (1–2)	**Shields** (0–3)	—	20,387	6–10	L1
17	April 22	Cardinals	4–1	**Cashner** (1–1)	Wainwright (0–3)	**Rodney** (3)	30,074	7–10	W1
18	April 23	Cardinals	2–11	Wacha (2–0)	**Quackenbush** (1–1)	—	31,688	7–11	L1
19	April 24	Cardinals	5–8	Siegrist (3–0)	**Maurer** (0–1)	Rosenthal (5)	37,395	7–12	L2
20	April 25	@ Giants	4–5	Bumgarner (2–2)	**Pomeranz** (2–2)	Casilla (4)	41,266	7–13	L3
21	April 26	@ Giants	0–1	Cueto (4–1)	**Shields** (0–4)	—	41,413	7–14	L4
22	April 27	@ Giants	9–13	Samardzija (3–1)	**Cashner** (1–2)	—	41,357	7–15	L5
23	April 29	@ Dodgers	5–1	**Buchter** (1–0)	Hatcher (2–3)	—	49,686	8–15	W1
24	April 30	@ Dodgers	5–2	**Rea** (2–1)	Stripling (0–2)	**Rodney** (4)	45,740	9–15	W2

May: 11–18 (Home: 6–7; Road: 5–11)

#	Date	Opponent	Score	Win	Loss	Save	Attendance	Record	Streak
25	May 1	@ Dodgers	0–1	Kershaw (3–1)	**Pomeranz** (2–3)	—	49,271	9–16	L1
26	May 2	Rockies	2–1	**Shields** (1–4)	Gray (0–1)	**Rodney** (5)	19,013	10–16	W1
27	May 3	Rockies	6–3	**Cashner** (2–2)	Butler (0–1)	**Rodney** (6)	20,394	11–16	W2
28	May 4	Rockies	0–2	Chatwood (4–2)	**Vargas** (0–1)	McGee (7)	20,038	11–17	L1
29	May 5	Mets	5–3	**Rea** (3–1)	deGrom (3–1)	**Rodney** (7)	21,608	12–17	W1
30	May 6	Mets	2–0	**Pomeranz** (3–3)	Syndergaard (2–2)	**Rodney** (8)	30,108	13–17	W2
31	May 7	Mets	3–6	Colón (3–1)	**Shields** (1–5)	Familia (9)	41,028	13–18	L1
32	May 8	Mets	3–4	Harvey (3–4)	**Cashner** (2–3)	Familia (10)	27,461	13–19	L2
—	May 9	@ Cubs	**Postponed (inclement weather)** (Makeup date: May 11)						
33	May 10	@ Cubs	7–8	Lester (4–1)	**Vargas** (0–2)	Rondon (7)	34,680	13–20	L3
34	May 11 (1)	@ Cubs	7–4	**Villanueva** (1–0)	Strop (1–1)	**Rodney** (9)	34,508	14–20	W1
35	May 11 (2)	@ Cubs	1–0	**Pomeranz** (4–3)	Lackey (4–2)	**Rodney** (10)	37,828	15–20	W2
36	May 12	@ Brewers	3–0	**Shields** (2–5)	Nelson (4–3)	**Buchter** (1)	17,374	16–20	W3
37	May 13	@ Brewers	0–1	Guerra (2–0)	**Friedrich** (0–1)	Jeffress (9)	35,291	16–21	L1
38	May 14	@ Brewers	8–7 (12)	**Campos** (1–0)	Capuano (1–1)	**Villanueva** (1)	28,896	17–21	W1
39	May 15	@ Brewers	2–3	Boyer (1–0)	**Quackenbush** (1–2)	Jeffress (10)	26,306	17–22	L1
40	May 17	Giants	1–5	Bumgarner (5–2)	**Rea** (3–2)	—	24,433	17–23	L2
41	May 18	Giants	1–2	Cueto (6–1)	**Pomeranz** (4–4)	—	23,518	17–24	L3
42	May 19	Giants	1–3	Samardzija (6–2)	**Shields** (2–6)	Casilla (10)	26,417	17–25	L4
43	May 20	Dodgers	7–6	**Quackenbush** (2–2)	Jansen (1–1)	—	31,836	18–25	W1
44	May 21	Dodgers	3–2	**Hand** (1–0)	Tsao (0–1)	—	40,221	19–25	W2
45	May 22	Dodgers	5–9 (17)	Stripling (2–3)	**Perdomo** (1–1)	—	43,100	19–26	L1
46	May 23	@ Giants	0–1	Cueto (7–1)	**Hand** (1–1)	—	42,099	19–27	L2
47	May 24	@ Giants	2–8	Samardzija (7–2)	**Cashner** (2–4)	—	41,772	19–28	L3
48	May 25	@ Giants	3–4	Kontos (1–1)	**Hand** (1–2)	—	41,772	19–29	L4
49	May 27	@ D-backs	10–3	**Friedrich** (1–1)	Ray (2–4)	—	24,935	20–29	W1
50	May 28	@ D-backs	7–8	Greinke (6–3)	**Vargas** (0–3)	—	23,927	20–30	L1
51	May 29	@ D-backs	3–6	Bradley (2–0)	**Pomeranz** (4–5)	Ziegler (9)	21,458	20–31	L2
52	May 30	@ Mariners	3–9	Karns (5–1)	**Cashner** (2–5)	—	29,764	20–32	L3
53	May 31	@ Mariners	4–16	Iwakuma (4–4)	**Shields** (2–7)	—	16,815	20–33	L4

June: 13–13 (Home: 8–9; Road: 5–4)

#	Date	Opponent	Score	Win	Loss	Save	Attendance	Record	Streak
54	June 1	Mariners	14–6	**Friedrich** (2–1)	Paxton (0–1)	—	20,557	21–33	W1
55	June 2	Mariners	13–16	Martin (1–0)	**Maurer** (0–2)	Cishek (13)	22,588	21–34	L1
56	June 3	Rockies	4–0	**Pomeranz** (5–5)	Rusin (1–4)	—	21,588	22–34	W1
57	June 4	Rockies	4–3	**Cashner** (3–5)	Bettis (4–5)	**Rodney** (11)	25,503	23–34	W2
58	June 5	Rockies	3–10	Gray (4–2)	**Perdomo** (1–2)	—	26,206	23–35	L1
59	June 6	Braves	7–2	**Friedrich** (3–1)	Pérez (2–2)	—	20,203	24–35	W1
60	June 7	Braves	4–3	**Thornton** (1–0)	Vizcaíno (1–1)	—	22,198	25–35	W2
61	June 8	Braves	2–4	Teherán (2–6)	**Pomeranz** (5–6)	Vizcaíno (7)	22,248	25–36	L1
62	June 10	@ Rockies	7–5	**Quackenbush** (3–2)	McGee (0–2)	**Rodney** (12)	32,663	26–36	W1
63	June 11	@ Rockies	3–5	Chatwood (8–4)	**Johnson** (0–3)	Estévez (1)	29,078	26–37	L1
64	June 12	@ Rockies	1–2	Germen (2–0)	**Quackenbush** (3–3)	Logan (1)	32,946	26–38	L2
65	June 13	Marlins	4–13	Chen (4–2)	**Rea** (3–3)	—	20,988	26–39	L3
66	June 14	Marlins	2–5	Koehler (5–6)	**Pomeranz** (5–7)	Ramos (20)	22,051	26–40	L4
67	June 15	Marlins	6–3	**Perdomo** (2–2)	Nicolino (2–4)	**Rodney** (13)	20,037	27–40	W1
68	June 16	Nationals	5–8	Roark (6–4)	**Johnson** (0–4)	Kelley (2)	22,648	27–41	L1
69	June 17	Nationals	5–7	Ross (6–4)	**Friedrich** (3–2)	Petit (1)	31,137	27–42	L2
70	June 18	Nationals	7–3	**Quackenbush** (4–3)	Rivero (0–3)	—	34,113	28–42	W1
71	June 19	Nationals	6–3	**Pomeranz** (6–7)	Gonzalez (3–6)	**Rodney** (14)	32,285	29–42	W2
72	June 21	@ Orioles	10–7	**Quackenbush** (5–3)	Givens (5–1)	**Rodney** (15)	23,876	30–42	W3
73	June 22	@ Orioles	2–7	Jiménez (4–7)	**Johnson** (0–5)	—	23,785	30–43	L1
74	June 23	@ Reds	7–4	**Friedrich** (4–2)	Ramirez (1–3)	**Rodney** (16)	20,443	31–43	W1
75	June 24	@ Reds	13–4	**Rea** (4–3)	Reed (0–1)	—	40,713	32–43	W2
76	June 25	@ Reds	3–0	**Pomeranz** (7–7)	Finnegan (3–6)	**Rodney** (17)	40,871	33–43	W3
77	June 26	@ Reds	0–3	DeSclafani (2–0)	**Perdomo** (2–3)	Cingrani (9)	40,085	33–44	L1
78	June 28	Orioles	7–11	Jiménez (5–7)	**Johnson** (0–6)	—	31,515	33–45	L2
79	June 29	Orioles	6–12	Gallardo (3–1)	**Friedrich** (4–3)	—	25,221	33–46	L3

July: 12–14 (Home: 6–3; Road: 6–11)

#	Date	Opponent	Score	Win	Loss	Save	Attendance	Record	Streak
80	July 1	Yankees	7–6	**Rea** (5–3)	Eovaldi (6–6)	**Maurer** (1)	41,321	34–46	W1
81	July 2	Yankees	2–1	**Hand** (2–2)	Miller (5–1)	—	42,315	35–46	W2
82	July 3	Yankees	3–6	Green (1–1)	**Cashner** (3–6)	Chapman (16)	42,131	35–47	L1
83	July 4	@ D-backs	8–4	**Perdomo** (3–3)	Bradley (3–4)	—	39,203	36–47	W1
84	July 5	@ D-backs	5–7	Godley (2–0)	**Friedrich** (4–4)	Ziegler (18)	14,110	36–48	L1
85	July 6	@ D-backs	13–6	**Dominguez** (1–0)	Miller (2–9)	—	17,091	37–48	W1
86	July 7	@ Dodgers	6–0	**Pomeranz** (8–7)	Ryu (0–1)	—	44,759	38–48	W2
87	July 8	@ Dodgers	6–10	Báez (2–2)	**Cashner** (3–7)	—	43,588	38–49	L1
88	July 9	@ Dodgers	3–4	McCarthy (2–0)	**Perdomo** (3–4)	Jansen (26)	48,411	38–50	L2
89	July 10	@ Dodgers	1–3	Maeda (8–6)	**Friedrich** (4–5)	Jansen (27)	42,801	38–51	L3
**87th All-Star Game in San Diego, California**
90	July 15	Giants	4–1	**Cashner** (4–7)	Bumgarner (10–7)	**Maurer** (2)	38,522	39–51	W1
91	July 16	Giants	7–6	**Quackenbush** (6–3)	Casilla (1–3)	—	40,550	40–51	W2
92	July 17	Giants	5–3	**Jackson** (1–1)	Cueto (13–2)	**Maurer** (3)	38,082	41–51	W3
93	July 18	@ Cardinals	2–10	Leake (7–7)	**Friedrich** (4–6)	—	40,137	41–52	L1
–	July 19	@ Cardinals	**Postponed (rain)** (Makeup date: July 20)						
94	July 20 (1)	@ Cardinals	2–4	Martinez (9−6)	**Rea** (5−4)	Oh (3)	40,184	41–53	L2
95	July 20 (2)	@ Cardinals	2−3	Garcia (7−6)	**Clemens** (1–1)	Oh (4)	41,012	41–54	L3
96	July 21	@ Cardinals	5–6	Broxton (2–2)	**Villanueva** (1–1)	—	40,134	41–55	L4
97	July 22	@ Nationals	5–3	**Perdomo** (4–4)	Roark (9–6)	**Maurer** (4)	31,618	42–55	W1
98	July 23	@ Nationals	2–3	Papelbon (2–2)	**Quackenbush** (6–4)	—	30,747	42–56	L1
99	July 24	@ Nationals	10–6	**Buchter** (2−0)	Papelbon (2–3)	—	30,663	43–56	W1
100	July 25	@ Blue Jays	2–4	Sanchez (11–1)	**Rea** (5–5)	Osuna (21)	41,483	43–57	L1
101	July 26	@ Blue Jays	6–7 (12)	Chavez (1–2)	**Villanueva** (1–2)	—	45,515	43–58	L2
102	July 27	@ Blue Jays	8–4	**Perdomo** (5–4)	Dickey (7–12)	—	47,301	44–58	W1
103	July 29	Reds	0–6	Finnegan (6–8)	**Jackson**(1–1)	—	33,509	44–59	L1
104	July 30	Reds	2–1	**Hand** (3–2)	Díaz (0–1)	—	31,620	45–59	W1
105	July 31	Reds	2–3	Bailey (1–0)	**Clemens** (1–2)	Cingrani (13)	27,436	45–60	L1

August: 10–17 (Home: 6–6; Road: 4–11)

#	Date	Opponent	Score	Win	Loss	Save	Attendance	Record	Streak
106	August 1	Brewers	7–3	**Villanueva** (2–2)	Nelson (6–10)	—	24,009	46–60	W1
107	August 2	Brewers	2–3	Davies (9–4)	**Perdomo** (5–5)	Thornburg (3)	26,152	46–61	L1
108	August 3	Brewers	12–3	**Jackson** (2–2)	Guerra (7–3)	—	24,124	47–61	W1
109	August 5	Phillies	4–5	Hellickson (9–7)	**Friedrich** (4–7)	Gómez (28)	27,521	47–62	L1
110	August 6	Phillies	9–7	**Baumann** (1–0)	**Thompson** (0–1)	—	37,453	48–62	W1
111	August 7	Phillies	5–6	Eickhoff (7–12)	**Hand** (3–3)	Gómez (29)	32,710	48–63	L1
112	August 9	@ Pirates	4–6	Kuhl (2–0)	**Perdomo** (5–6)	Watson (3)	30,269	48–64	L2
113	August 10	@ Pirates	4–0	**Jackson** (3–2)	Vogelsong (1–2)	—	29,623	49–64	W1
114	August 11	@ Pirates	0–4	Taillon (3–2)	**Friedrich** (4–8)	Watson (4)	32,071	49–65	L1
115	August 12	@ Mets	8–6	**Clemens** (2–2)	Verrett (3–8)	**Maurer** (5)	24,422	50–65	W1
116	August 13	@ Mets	2–3	Ynoa (1–0)	**Maurer** (0–3)	—	36,854	50–66	L1
117	August 14	@ Mets	1–5	Matz (9–8)	**Richard** (0–2)	—	26,612	50–67	L2
118	August 15	@ Rays	2–8	Smyly (5–11)	**Perdomo** (5–7)	—	10,417	50–68	L3
119	August 16	@ Rays	1–15	Snell (4–5)	**Jackson** (3–3)	—	10,793	50–69	L4
120	August 17	@ Rays	0−2	Archer (7–16)	**Friedrich** (4–9)	Colomé (28)	10,251	50–70	L5
121	August 18	D-backs	9–8	**Buchter** (3−0)	Barrett (1–1)	**Maurer** (6)	32,103	51–70	W1
122	August 19	D-backs	7–4	**Quackenbush** (7–4)	Corbin (4–13)	—	26,080	52–70	W2
123	August 20	D-backs	1−2	Ray (7−11)	**Richard** (0−3)	Burgos (1)	32,599	52−71	L1
124	August 21	D-backs	9–1	**Perdomo** (6–7)	Shipley (2−3)	—	28,150	53–71	W1
125	August 22	Cubs	1–5	Lester (4–4)	**Jackson** (3–4)	—	31,707	53–72	L1
126	August 23	Cubs	3–5	Arrieta (16–5)	**Friedrich** (4–10)	Chapman (28)	33,614	53–73	L2
127	August 24	Cubs	3–6	Hendricks (12–7)	**Clemens** (2–3)	Chapman (29)	30,033	53–74	L3
128	August 26	@ Marlins	6–7	Rodney (2–3)	**Maurer** (0–4)	—	17,775	53–75	L4
129	August 27	@ Marlins	1–0	**Richard** (1−3)	Ureña (2–5)	**Quackenbush** (1)	20,007	54–75	W1
130	August 28	@ Marlins	3–1	**Perdomo** (7–7)	Nicolino (2–6)	—	19,883	55–75	W2
131	August 30	@ Braves	3–7	Teherán (4–9)	**Jackson** (3–5)	—	20,309	55–76	L1
132	August 31	@ Braves	8–1	Wisler (6–11)	**Clemens** (2–4)	—	20,899	55–77	L2

September: 13–15 (Home: 9–8; Road: 4–7)

#	Date	Opponent	Score	Win	Loss	Save	Attendance	Record	Streak
133	September 1	@ Braves	6–9	Foltynewicz (8–5)	**Cosart** (0–2)	Johnson (14)	22,253	55–78	L3
134	September 2	@ Dodgers	4–2	**Hand** (4–3)	Liberatore (2–2)	**Maurer** (7)	48,911	56–78	W1
135	September 3	@ Dodgers	1–5	Hill (11–3)	**Perdomo** (7–8)	—	47,590	56–79	L1
136	September 4	@ Dodgers	4–7	De Leon (1–0)	**Quackenbush** (7–5)	Jansen (41)	46,441	56–80	L2
137	September 5	Red Sox	2–1	**Jackson** (4–5)	Pomeranz (10–11)	**Maurer** (8)	40,446	57–80	W1
138	September 6	Red Sox	1–5	Buchholz (6–10)	**Clemens** (2–5)	—	30,644	57–81	L1
139	September 7	Red Sox	2–7	Price (15–8)	**Cosart** (0–3)	—	31,662	57–82	L2
140	September 8	Rockies	14–1	**Richard** (2−3)	Hoffman (0−3)	—	26,053	58–82	W1
141	September 9	Rockies	1–4	Chatwood (11–9)	**Perdomo** (7–9)	Ottavino (3)	25,015	58–83	L1
142	September 10	Rockies	6–3	**Friedrich** (5–10)	Gray (9–8)	**Maurer** (9)	23,719	59–83	W1
143	September 11	Rockies	2–3 (10)	McGee (2–3)	**Quackenbush** (7–6)	Ottavino (4)	25,133	59–84	L1
144	September 12	@ Giants	4–0	**Clemens** (2–5)	Samardzija (11–10)	—	41,233	60–84	W1
145	September 13	@ Giants	6–4	**Smith** (1–0)	Strickland (3–3)	**Quackenbush** (2)	41,231	61–84	W2
146	September 14	@ Giants	3–1	**Perdomo** (8–9)	Bumgarner (10–7)	**Maurer** (10)	41,183	62–84	W3
147	September 16	@ Rockies	7–8	Ottavino (1–2)	**Maurer** (0–5)	—	30,451	62–85	L1
148	September 17	@ Rockies	0–8	Gray (10–8)	**Jackson** (4–6)	—	34,724	62–86	L2
149	September 18	@ Rockies	3–6	Bettis (13–4)	**Cosart** (0–4)	Ottavino (5)	25,811	62–87	L3
150	September 19	D-backs	3–2	**Richard** (3−3)	Shipley (4−4)	**Maurer** (11)	20,250	63–87	W1
151	September 20	D-backs	5–2	**Hessler** (1–0)	Godley (4−4)	**Maurer** (12)	34,319	64–87	W2
152	September 21	D-backs	2–3	Greinke (4−4)	**Perdomo** (8–10)	Hudson (4)	22,110	64–88	L1
153	September 22	Giants	1–2	Samardzija (12–10)	**Friedrich** (5–11)	Romo (2)	25,789	64–89	L2
154	September 23	Giants	7–2	**Jackson** (5–6)	Suárez (3–5)	—	28,404	65–89	W1
155	September 24	Giants	6–9	Smith (2–4)	**Quackenbush** (7–7)	Romo (3)	31,171	65–90	L1
156	September 25	Giants	4–3	**Morrow** (1–0)	Gearrin (3–2)	**Hand** (1)	28,456	66–90	W1
157	September 27	Dodgers	7–1	**Clemens** (4–5)	Maeda (16–10)	—	27,376	67–90	W2
158	September 28	Dodgers	6–5	**Perdomo** (9–10)	Stripling (5–9)	**Maurer** (13)	29,471	68–90	W3
159	September 29	Dodgers	4–9	Anderson (5–9)	**Friedrich** (5–12)	—	35,804	68–91	L1
160	September 30	@ D-backs	3–5	Delgado (5–2)	**Jackson** (5–7)	Hudson (1–0)	42,651	68–92	L2

October: 0–2 (Home: 0–0; Road: 0–2)

#	Date	Opponent	Score	Win	Loss	Save	Attendance	Record	Streak
161	October 1	@ D-backs	5–9	Bradley (8–9)	**Richard** (3−4)	—	32,811	68–93	L3
162	October 2	@ D-backs	2–3	Hudson (3-2)	**Hand** (4-4)	—	31,385	68–94	L4

== Roster ==
2016 San Diego Padres
Roster
Pitchers: 77 Buddy Baumann; 40 Ryan Buchter; 57 Leonel Campos; 34 Andrew Cashner; 47,91 Paul Clemens; 55 Jarred Cosart; 62 José Dominguez; 41 Robbie Erlin; 53 Christian Friedrich; 55 Tayron Guerrero; 52 Brad Hand; 54 Keith Hessler; 33 Edwin Jackson; 50 Erik Johnson; 50 Michael Kirkman; 37 Brandon Maurer; 21 Brandon Morrow; 61 Luis Perdomo; 13 Drew Pomeranz; 59 Kevin Quackenbush; 29 Colin Rea; 27 Clayton Richard; 56 Fernando Rodney; 38 Tyson Ross; 33 James Shields; 64 Jake Smith; 46 Matt Thornton; 76 José Torres; 49 César Vargas; 23 Carlos Villanueva	Catchers: 12 Christian Bethancourt; 18 Austin Hedges; 3 Derek Norris; 44 Héctor Sánchez; Infielders: 5 Alexi Amarista; 63 Carlos Asuaje; 4 Wil Myers; 28 Nick Noonan; 17 José Pirela; 10 Alexei Ramírez; 13 José Rondón; 9 Adam Rosales; 2 Luis Sardiñas; 11 Ryan Schimpf; 26 Yangervis Solarte; 15 Cory Spangenberg; 39 Brett Wallace; 8 Jemile Weeks	Outfielders: 34 Oswaldo Arcia; 32 Jabari Blash; 1 Alex Dickerson; 16 Travis Jankowski; 24 Jon Jay; 27 Matt Kemp; 46 Patrick Kivlehan; 70 Manuel Margot; 71 Hunter Renfroe; 2 Melvin Upton	Manager: 14 Andy Green; Coaches: 36 Darren Balsley (pitching); 81 Griffin Benedict (bullpen catcher); 45 Doug Bochtler (bullpen); 20 Tarrik Brock (first base); 48 Justin Hatcher (bullpen catcher); 30 Glenn Hoffman (third base); 25 Mark McGwire (bench); 7 Eddie Rodríguez (coach); 22 Alan Zinter (hitting)

== Player stats ==
Both tables are sortable.

=== Batting ===
Final stats through October 2, 2016. Players in bold are on the active roster as of the 2022 season.

Note: G = Games played; AB = At bats; R = Runs scored; H = Hits; 2B = Doubles; 3B = Triples; HR = Home runs; RBI = Runs batted in; BB = Walks; SO = Strikeouts; AVG = Batting average; SB = Stolen bases

† = Stats only with Padres

Player	G	AB	R	H	2B	3B	HR	RBI	BB	SO	AVG	SB
Alexi Amarista	65	140	9	36	2	0	0	11	8	26	.257	9
Oswaldo Arcia	14	43	2	5	1	0	2	4	2	14	.116	0
Carlos Asuaje	7	24	2	5	2	0	0	2	1	4	.208	0
**Christian Bethancourt**	73	193	20	44	9	0	6	25	10	56	.228	1
Jabari Blash	38	71	7	12	2	0	3	5	11	34	.169	1
Andrew Cashner	16	18	2	3	0	0	0	1	2	6	.167	0
Paul Clemens	15	19	1	0	0	0	0	0	1	9	.000	0
**Alex Dickerson**	84	253	39	65	16	2	10	37	26	44	.257	5
**Robbie Erlin**	3	6	0	0	0	0	0	0	0	3	.000	0
Christian Friedrich	24	37	2	2	0	0	0	2	3	23	.054	0
**Brad Hand**	82	4	0	0	0	0	0	0	0	1	.000	0
**Austin Hedges**	8	24	2	3	1	0	0	1	0	7	.125	0
Edwin Jackson	15	23	2	5	1	0	0	2	3	11	.217	1
**Travis Jankowski**	131	335	53	82	13	2	2	12	42	100	.245	30
Jon Jay	90	347	49	101	26	1	2	26	19	78	.291	2
Erik Johnson †	4	4	0	0	0	0	0	0	0	3	.000	0
Matt Kemp †	100	409	54	107	24	0	23	69	16	100	.262	0
Patrick Kivlehan	5	16	5	4	0	0	1	2	2	9	.250	0
**Manuel Margot**	10	37	4	9	4	1	0	3	0	7	.243	2
**Wil Myers**	157	599	99	155	29	4	28	94	68	160	.259	28
Nick Noonan	7	18	0	3	0	0	0	1	1	5	.167	0
Derek Norris	125	415	50	77	17	0	14	42	36	139	.186	9
**Luis Perdomo**	36	38	1	5	1	0	0	1	1	15	.132	0
José Pirela	15	39	2	6	2	0	0	0	1	9	.154	0
Drew Pomeranz †	17	33	2	5	0	0	1	4	0	19	.152	0
Alexei Ramírez †	128	421	33	101	19	2	5	41	17	56	.240	6
Colin Rea †	20	33	3	4	0	0	0	1	2	16	.121	0
**Hunter Renfroe**	11	35	8	13	3	0	4	14	1	5	.371	0
Clayton Richard	11	16	0	1	0	0	0	1	1	9	.063	0
José Rondón	8	25	1	3	0	0	0	1	1	4	.120	0
Adam Rosales	105	214	37	49	12	3	13	35	29	88	.229	4
Tyson Ross	1	1	0	0	0	0	0	0	0	1	.000	0
Héctor Sánchez †	26	42	3	12	1	0	3	7	3	8	.286	0
Luis Sardiñas	34	108	13	31	6	1	2	13	11	23	.287	3
Ryan Schimpf	89	276	48	60	17	5	20	51	42	105	.217	1
James Shields †	11	17	1	3	0	0	0	0	0	11	.176	0
Yangervis Solarte	109	405	55	116	26	1	15	71	30	63	.286	1
Cory Spangenberg	14	48	6	11	1	1	1	8	4	13	.229	1
Melvin Upton, Jr. †	92	344	46	88	11	2	16	45	23	106	.256	20
César Vargas	7	8	0	0	0	0	0	0	0	5	.000	0
Carlos Villanueva	51	4	0	0	0	0	0	0	0	4	.000	0
Brett Wallace	119	217	19	41	10	0	6	20	29	83	.189	0
Jemile Weeks	17	50	5	7	1	1	0	2	3	14	.140	1
**Team totals**	**162**	**5419**	**686**	**1275**	**257**	**26**	**177**	**654**	**449**	**1500**	**.235**	**125**

=== Pitching ===
Final stats through October 2, 2016. Players in bold are on the active roster as of the 2022 MLB season.

Note: W = Wins; L = Losses; ERA = Earned run average; G = Games pitched; GS = Games started; SV = Saves; IP = Innings pitched; H = Hits allowed; R = Runs allowed; ER = Earned runs allowed; BB = Walks allowed; K = Strikeouts

† = Stats only with Padres

Player	W	L	ERA	G	GS	SV	IP	H	R	ER	BB	K
Alexi Amarista	0	0	0.00	1	0	0	0.1	0	0	0	0	0
Buddy Baumann	1	0	3.72	11	0	0	9.2	7	4	4	4	10
**Christian Bethancourt**	0	0	0.00	2	0	0	1.2	1	0	0	3	1
Ryan Buchter	3	0	2.86	67	0	1	63.0	34	20	20	31	78
Leonel Campos	1	0	5.73	18	0	0	22.0	18	16	14	14	24
Andrew Cashner†	4	7	4.76	16	16	0	79.1	80	47	42	30	67
Paul Clemens†	3	5	3.67	16	12	0	61.1	61	32	25	23	47
Jarred Cosart†	0	3	6.03	9	9	0	37.1	42	27	25	23	27
José Domínguez	1	0	5.05	34	0	0	35.2	34	23	20	17	20
**Robbie Erlin**	1	2	4.02	3	2	0	15.2	12	7	7	3	13
Christian Friedrich	5	12	4.80	24	23	0	129.1	131	74	69	52	100
Tayron Guerrero†	0	0	4.50	1	0	0	2.0	3	1	1	1	0
**Brad Hand**	4	4	2.92	82	0	1	89.1	63	32	29	36	111
Keith Hessler	1	0	3.38	15	0	0	18.2	19	7	7	11	9
Edwin Jackson†	5	6	5.89	13	13	0	73.1	79	49	48	35	54
Erik Johnson†	0	4	9.15	4	4	0	19.2	32	20	20	5	10
Michael Kirkman†	0	0	27.00	1	0	0	1.1	6	4	4	0	0
Brandon Maurer	0	5	4.52	71	0	13	69.2	65	37	35	23	72
Brandon Morrow	1	0	1.69	18	0	0	16.0	19	4	3	3	8
**Luis Perdomo**	9	10	5.71	35	20	0	146.2	187	99	93	46	105
Drew Pomeranz†	8	7	2.47	17	17	0	102.0	67	30	28	41	115
Kevin Quackenbush	7	7	3.92	60	0	2	59.2	55	27	26	22	42
Colin Rea†	5	5	4.98	19	18	0	99.1	101	63	55	44	76
Clayton Richard†	3	3	2.52	11	9	0	53.2	58	21	15	24	34
Fernando Rodney†	0	1	0.31	28	0	17	28.2	13	2	1	12	33
Tyson Ross	0	1	11.81	1	1	0	5.1	9	8	7	1	5
James Shields†	2	7	4.28	11	11	0	67.1	69	33	32	27	57
Matt Thornton	1	0	5.82	18	0	0	17.0	22	12	11	6	9
César Vargas	0	3	5.03	7	7	0	34.0	41	19	19	15	28
Carlos Villanueva	2	2	5.96	51	0	1	74.0	89	50	49	14	61
**Team totals**	**68**	**94**	**4.43**	**162**	**162**	**35**	**1440.0**	**1425**	**770**	**708**	**569**	**1222**

== Awards and honors ==
All-Star Game

- Wil Myers, 1B, Reserve
- Drew Pomeranz, Pitcher, Reserve

== Farm system ==
Updated as of September 24, 2016

Level	Team	League	Manager	W	L	Position
AAA	El Paso Chihuahuas	Pacific Coast League	Rod Barajas	73	70	League champions Triple-A Championship runner-up PCL Pacific South
AA	San Antonio Missions	Texas League	Phillip Wellman	58	82	Last place TL South; 27.0 GB
High A	Lake Elsinore Storm	California League	Lance Burkhart	69	71	4th place CAL South; 13.0 GB
A	Fort Wayne TinCaps	Midwest League	Anthony Contreras	62	78	7th place MID East; 22.5 GB
A-Short Season	Tri-City Dust Devils	Northwest League	Ben Fritz	34	42	2nd place NWL North; 11.0 GB
Rookie	AZL Padres	Arizona League	Michael Collins	25	30	3rd place AZL West; 6.0 GB
Rookie	DSL Padres	Dominican Summer League	Jeremy Rodriguez	36	33	3rd place DSL Baseball City; 13.0 GB
