= Spangenberg (disambiguation) =

Spangenberg is a small town in northeastern Hesse, Germany.

Spangenberg may also refer to:

- Spangenberg (surname), including a list of people with the name
- Spangenberg Castle (disambiguation)
- USS Spangenberg (DE-223), a Buckley-class destroyer escort

== See also ==
- Charles Spangenberg Farmstead, Woodbury, Minnesota
- Frederick Spangenberg House, Saint Paul, Minnesota
