= Spangenberg (surname) =

Spangenberg is a surname. Notable people with the surname include:

- August Gottlieb Spangenberg (1704–1792), German theologian and minister
- Bill Spangenberg (active 1947–1962), bass singer in the Buffalo Bills barbershop quartet
- Cory Spangenberg (born 1991), American baseball player
- Craig Spangenberg (1914–1998), American trial attorney
- Cyriacus Spangenberg (1528–1604), German theologian and historian
- Detlev Spangenberg (born 1944), German politician
- Doug Spangenberg (born 1975), American music video director and documentary film maker
- Evgeni Pavlovich Spangenberg (1898–1968), Soviet ornithologist
- Frank Spangenberg (born 1957), American game show contestant
- George Spangenberg (1912–2000), American aircraft designer
- Hugo Spangenberg (born 1975), Argentine chess grandmaster
- Jeff Spangenberg (active from 1991), American video game producer and entrepreneur
- Johannes Ernst Spangenberg (1755–1814), American fraktur artist
- Karl Spangenberg, American engineer
- Marco Spangenberg (born 1980), German sport shooter who competed in the 2004 Summer Olympics
- Theunis Spangenberg (born 1983), South African golfer
- Trevor Spangenberg (born 1991), American professional soccer player
