= Ted M. Warshafsky =

American lawyer

- Portrait of Warshafsky in his later years
- Born: Ted M. Warshafsky; December 6, 1926; St. Louis, Missouri
- Died: October 14, 2012 (aged 85); Jefferson County, Wisconsin, U.S.
- Education: University of Wisconsin Law School
- Occupation: Lawyer
- Organization: Warshafsky Law Firm
- Notable work: The Trial Handbook for Wisconsin Lawyers
- Partner: Debra K. Reidel
- Children: 5
- Parent(s): Ida and Israel Warshafsky

Ted M. Warshafsky (December 6, 1926 – October 14, 2012) was a personal injury lawyer and activist best known for establishing the successful Warshafsky Law Firm in Milwaukee, Wisconsin and nominating Julian Bond as the first African American major-party candidate for Vice President of the United States.

== Early life ==
The son of two immigrants, Ted Warshafsky was born in St. Louis, Missouri to Ida and Israel Warshafsky. His parents divorced by the time he turned 4 years old. When Warshafsky turned 18, he joined the Marines and later attended the University of Wisconsin Law School on the GI Bill. Warshafsky later lived on the upper east side of Milwaukee in the Murray Hill neighborhood after graduating from college. He went on to build a reputation for winning multi-million dollar lawsuits, mostly against big name drug companies. During his professional career, he spent his time in both local and national politics.

== Politics ==
- 1967 – Warshafsky encouraged his children to be actively involved in the protests of segregation in Milwaukee schools and would have them join him on a march with Father James Groppi in support of an open housing ordinance.
- 1968 – Serving as a field finance director on Eugene McCarthy's presidential campaign team, Warshafsky would also be the vice chairman of McCarthy's delegation and went on to nominate Julian Bond for Vice President at the Democratic National Convention of the same year.
- 1989 – Warshafsky filed a personal suit against ExxonMobil following the Valdez oil spill on behalf of the fish and wildlife of Alaska.
- 2008 – During John Edwards' Presidential campaign, Warshafsky would make donations to support his push for an end to poverty, providing universal health care, ending the war in Iraq, and fighting global warming.

== Warshafsky Law Firm ==
After leaving law school, Ted M. Warshafsky struggled to find footing in the legal world until he founded the Warshafsky Law Firm. Based out of Wisconsin, Warshafsky Law Firm has grown to be one of the largest law firms in the Milwaukee area. In competition with firms such as Foley and Lardner LLP and Michael Best & Friedrich LLP, Warshafsky Law Firm has a history of specializing in personal injury and medical malpractice cases.

=== Lawsuits ===
- 1976 – Warshafsky Law Firm wins the biggest personal injury lawsuit settlement in Wisconsin history, up to this point in time. General Motors was sued after a young girl suffered brain damage as the result of a faulty GM part in a car crash. General Motors made an appeal, which Warshafsky followed by accepting a $3 million agreement.
- 1987 – Wyeth Laboratories was challenged by Warshafsky in a lawsuit regarding another young girl's brain damage, this time caused by the DPT vaccine. Once the lawsuit was filed and persecuted, Ted Warshafsky won the case with a $15 million victory for the parents of the injured girl.
- 2007 – Warshafsky went to the Wisconsin Supreme Court in an attempt to re-open a class-action lawsuit against American motorcycle manufacturer Harley-Davidson, accusing the company of failing to inform consumers of a defect in two engine types they sold during the years 1999 and 2000.
- 2009 – Continuing to seek justice, Warshafsky fought for the release of medical records from the American Association of Neurological Surgeons following a $2.9 million malpractice payout, made without a confidentiality agreement. In this case, Warshafsky believed secrecy would put the public at risk and actively worked to spread the word about the payout.

==== Book Series ====
While developing his professional career with Warshafsky Law Firm, Ted M. Warshafsky wrote a book series with his colleague called The Trial Handbook for Wisconsin Lawyers. This collection contained multiple volumes of information regarding issues of Wisconsin civil and criminal law. Printed by Lawyers Cooperative Publishing, the series of guides gives readers instruction, information, and advice for legal cases and trials, including how lawyers should conduct themselves during trials, how to handle circumstantial evidence, and the course of actions one should take once a final judgement has been made by the court.

===== Philanthropy =====
The Warshafsky Law Firm reflects the advocacy and passion Ted M. Warshafsky has always had for helping communities. The Warshafsky Law Firm formed a charitable foundation, known as Venice Arts, to distribute scholarships to young people in Milwaukee who are needy and deserving. Many groups are supported through donations made by Warshafsky Law Firm, including the Holton Street YMCA, Pearls for Girls, and the Southern Poverty Law Center.

== Acknowledgements ==
In 2008, Ted M. Warshafsky was included in the Wisconsin Super Lawyers and received a Lifetime Achievement Award of Wisconsin Leaders in Law from the Wisconsin Law Journal. Later in 2009, Warshafsky was also selected as one of the top 100 lawyers in Wisconsin by the State Bar of Wisconsin and was recognized by the American Association for Justice as being one of the top 100 trial lawyers in the United States.

During his lifetime, Warshafsky served as a member and diplomat for a number of professional associations, including the American Board of Trial Lawyers, the American College of Trial Lawyers, the International Academy of Trial Lawyers, the New Democratic Coalition, and the International Society of Barristers. Warshafsky also gave time as the national secretary for the Association of Trial Lawyers of America and as President of both the Wisconsin Academy of Trial Lawyers and Trial Lawyers Doing Public Justice.

== Illness and death ==
After suffering from a stroke in November 2011, Warshafsky died on October 14, 2012, at the age of 85, in his Jefferson County home.
