= McElhaney =

McElhaney is a surname. Notable people with the surname include:

- Douglas L. McElhaney (born 1947), American diplomat
- James W. McElhaney (1938–2017), American lawyer and academic
- Lynette Gibson McElhaney, American politician
- Ralph McElhaney (1870–1930), Scottish footballer
