= Cory Spangenberg =

American baseball player (born 1991)

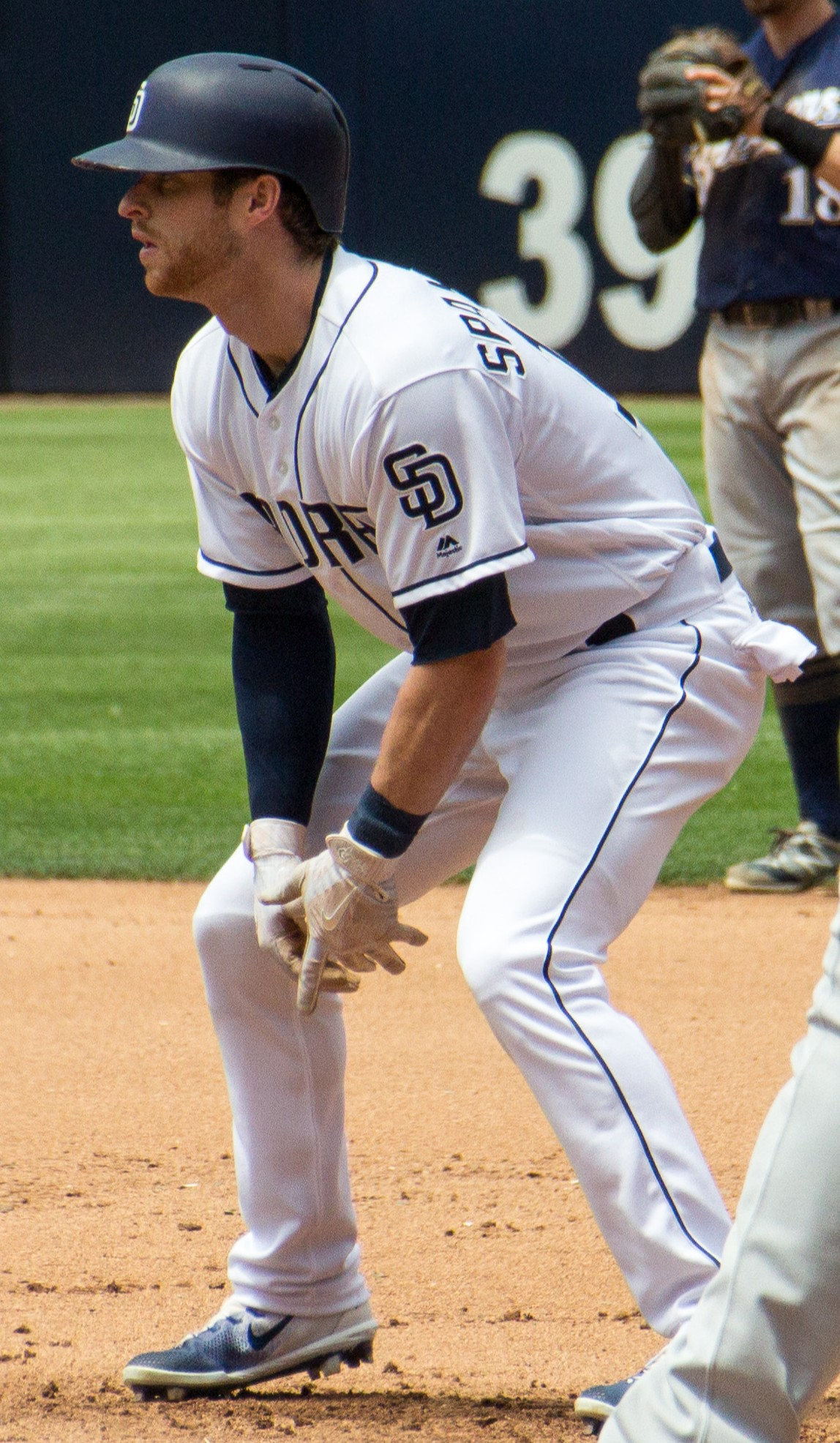
- Spangenberg with the San Diego Padres in 2017
- Infielder
- Born: March 16, 1991 (age 34); Clarks Summit, Pennsylvania, U.S.
- Batted: Left Threw: Right

Professional debut
- MLB: September 1, 2014, for the San Diego Padres
- NPB: June 19, 2020, for the Saitama Seibu Lions

Last appearance
- MLB: July 26, 2022, for the St. Louis Cardinals
- NPB: September 14, 2021, for the Saitama Seibu Lions

MLB statistics
- Batting average: .256
- Home runs: 29
- Runs batted in: 119

NPB statistics
- Batting average: .257
- Home runs: 22
- Runs batted in: 84
- Stats at Baseball Reference

Teams
- San Diego Padres (2014–2018); Milwaukee Brewers (2019); Saitama Seibu Lions (2020–2021); St. Louis Cardinals (2022)

Cory Joseph Spangenberg (/ˈspændʒənbɜːrɡ/; born March 16, 1991) is an American former professional baseball infielder. He played in Major League Baseball (MLB) for the San Diego Padres, Milwaukee Brewers, and St. Louis Cardinals, and in Nippon Professional Baseball (NPB) for the Saitama Seibu Lions.

The Padres selected Spangenberg in the first round, with the 10th overall selection, of the 2011 MLB draft. He made his MLB debut with the Padres in 2014 and played for them until 2018. Spangenberg played for the Brewers in 2019, the Lions in 2020 and 2021, and the Cardinals in 2022.

== Early career ==
Spangenberg graduated from Abington Heights High School in Clarks Summit, Pennsylvania, in 2009. During his senior year, he led the Abington Heights Comets varsity baseball team to a Pennsylvania Interscholastic Athletic Association Class AAA state championship. Spangenberg attended the Virginia Military Institute (VMI) in 2010, and played college baseball for the VMI Keydets. He was named the Big South Conference's freshman of the year. He transferred to Indian River State College in 2011, stating that the military commitment of VMI took too much time away from baseball and his coursework.

== Professional career ==
=== San Diego Padres ===
==== Minor leagues ====
The San Diego Padres of Major League Baseball (MLB) selected Spangenberg in the first round, with the 10th overall selection, of the 2011 MLB draft. Spangenberg signed with the Padres, receiving a $1.883 million signing bonus. He made his professional debut with the Eugene Emeralds and was promoted to the Fort Wayne TinCaps in July. In 72 games between both teams, Spangenberg batted .316 with three home runs and 44 runs batted in (RBI). Before the 2012 season, MLB.com rated Spangenberg as the 81st best prospect in baseball.

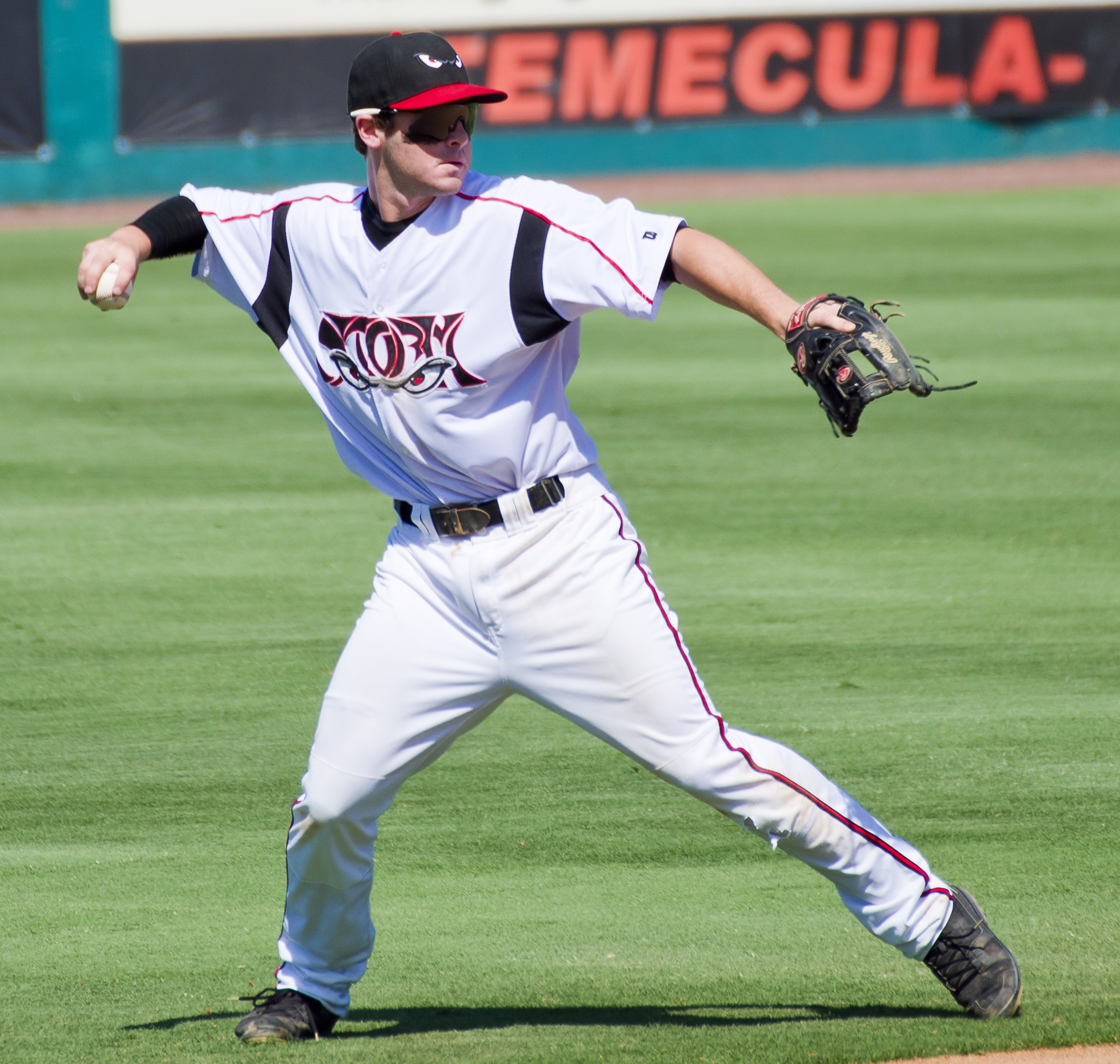
Spangenberg with the Lake Elsinore Storm in 2012

Spangenberg played for the Lake Elsinore Storm in 2012 where he hit .271 with one home run and 40 RBI in 98 games, and Lake Elsinore and the San Antonio Missions in 2013 where he slashed .292/.346/.407 with six home runs and 51 RBI in 130 games. He spent 2014 with the Missions. He missed two months of the season in 2014 after suffering a concussion, but was named the Texas League Player of the Month for July after returning to the Missions. Spangenberg, who had primarily played second base in his minor league career, also moved around the field in 2014, making starts at third base and in center field. In 66 games for San Antonio, he batted .331 with two home runs and 22 RBI.

==== Major leagues ====
The Padres promoted Spangenberg to the major leagues for the first time on September 1, 2014, receiving a start at third base and recording his first Major League hit, a two-run single. He hit a walk-off home run off Brad Ziegler of the Arizona Diamondbacks in his second Major League game. Spangenberg played in 20 games in 2014, making starts at third and in left field.

Spangenberg made the Padres' Opening Day roster in 2015 as a bench player, making occasional appearances at second and third. By June 2015, Spangenberg began to gain playing time at second base, due to the struggles of Jedd Gyorko. He suffered a knee injury in late June and went on the disabled list, returning in mid-August. For 2015, Spangenberg finished with a .271/.333/.399 batting line and four home runs in 108 games, with 48 starts at second base and 11 at third base.

Spangenberg was the starting second baseman on the 2016 Opening Day roster, but he tore his quadriceps muscle in April and played in only 14 games that season. Jemile Weeks, and later Alexi Amarista, and Ryan Schimpf, picked up most of the remaining time at second base.

After competing with Schimpf for the starting third base job in spring training in 2017, Spangenberg was among the Padres' final roster cuts. Schimpf struggled with the Padres, and they recalled Spangenberg on April 25 after he batted .348 with the El Paso Chihuahuas. Spangenberg started slowly, but improved in the second half, putting up a .794 OPS with eight home runs after the All-Star break and claiming the third-base position as Yangervis Solarte transitioned to shortstop in August. He finished with a .264/.322/.401 batting line and 13 home runs in 129 games, with 86 starts at third base, 12 in left field, and four at second. In 2018, Spangenberg hit .235 with seven home runs and 25 RBI. He was designated for assignment on November 20 and released the next day.

=== Milwaukee Brewers ===
Spangenberg signed a one-year deal with the Milwaukee Brewers on January 4, 2019. He opened the 2019 season with the San Antonio Missions. On May 14, he was designated for assignment. On August 24, the Brewers selected Spangenberg's contract. In Triple-A with the San Antonio Missions, he led the PCL with 28 stolen bases while being caught four times, and batted .309/.378/.498.

=== Saitama Seibu Lions ===
On December 6, 2019, Spangenberg signed with the Saitama Seibu Lions of Nippon Professional Baseball (NPB). After hitting .268/.326/.482 with 15 home runs in 2020 to go along with 12 stolen bases, Spangenberg re-signed a $1.4MM contract with the Lions for the 2021 season on January 14, 2021. He elected free agency following the 2021 season.

=== St. Louis Cardinals ===
On March 25, 2022, Spangenberg signed a minor league contract with the St. Louis Cardinals. He began the season with the Triple-A Memphis Redbirds.

On July 26, the Cardinals promoted Spangenberg to the major leagues for a series on the road against the Toronto Blue Jays, replacing players who were not vaccinated against COVID-19. He appeared in one game as a defensive substitute for Albert Pujols, and was removed from the 40-man roster and returned to Triple-A on July 29. In 106 games for Memphis, he hit .236/.290/.385 with 10 home runs, 42 RBI, and 14 stolen bases. He elected free agency following the season on November 10.

== Personal life ==
Spangenberg and his wife, Julie, had a baby during the 2020 season.

On April 17, 2024, Spangenberg was named Lackawanna County's liaison for the New York Yankees' Triple–A affiliate, the Scranton/Wilkes-Barre RailRiders. He was offered the position after encountering Lackawanna County commissioner Matt McGloin at a trampoline park.
