= International Society of Barristers =

Honor society for trial lawyers

The International Society of Barristers is an honor society for the best trial lawyers.

== Overview ==
It was created in 1965. Famed trial lawyer Craig Spangenberg was one of the founding members, and its first president. Its members are mostly from the United States, Puerto Rico, the Virgin Islands, Australia, Canada, England, Scotland, and Mexico. New members for the society are elected by the Board of Governors after a nomination from an existing Fellow of the society.

In 2002, the International Society of Barristers Foundation was created. It aims at helping poor people who may have been wrongfully convicted.

The society publishes a journal, the International Society of Barristers Quarterly.
