= César Vargas =

Mexican baseball player (born 1991)

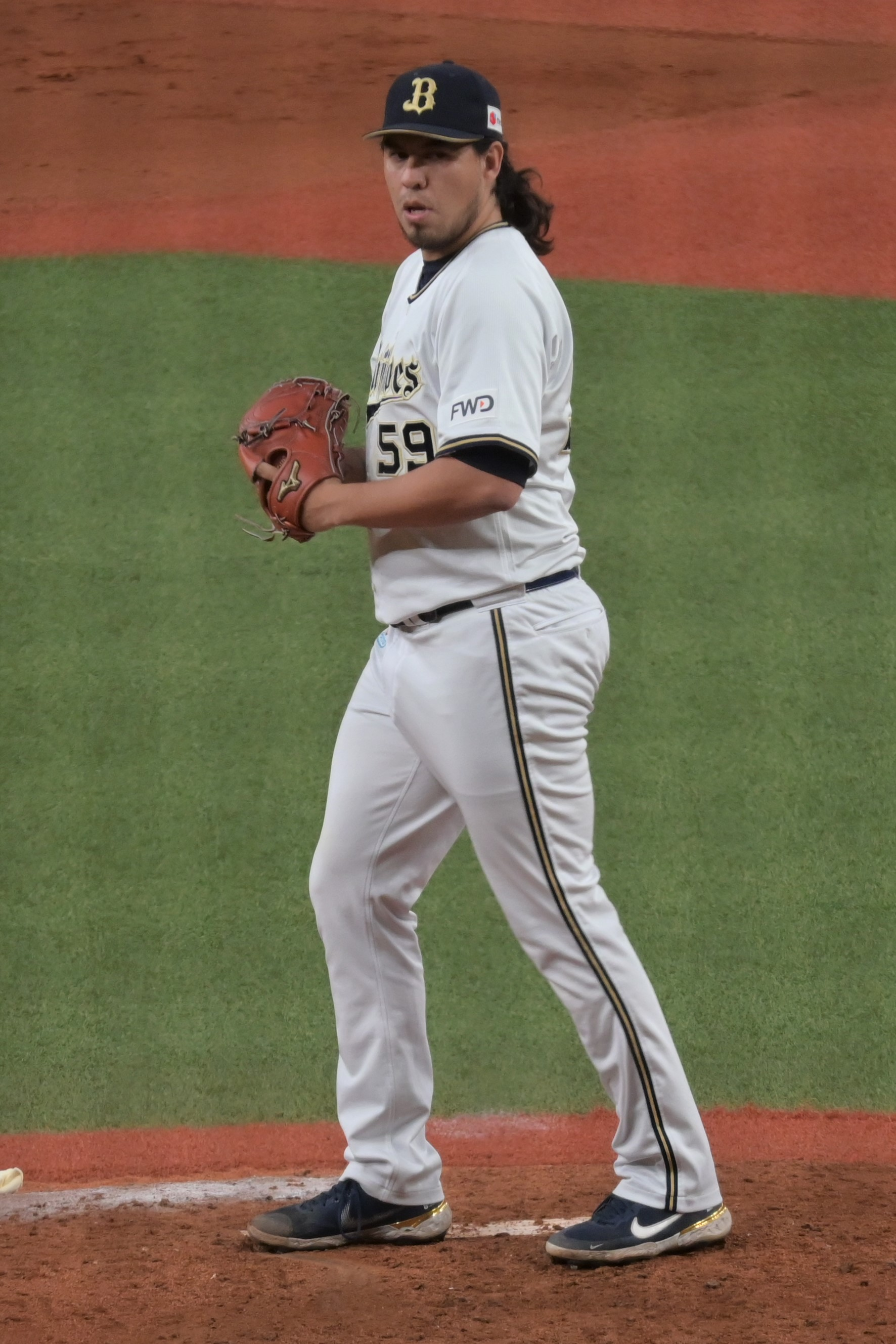
- Vargas with the Orix Buffaloes

El Águila de Veracruz – No. 39
- Pitcher
- Born: December 30, 1991 (age 34); Puebla, Mexico
- Bats: Right Throws: Right

Professional debut
- MLB: April 23, 2016, for the San Diego Padres
- NPB: August 28, 2021, for the Orix Buffaloes

MLB statistics (through 2016 season)
- Win–loss record: 0–3
- Earned run average: 5.03
- Strikeouts: 28

NPB statistics (through 2022 season)
- Win–loss record: 1–2
- Earned run average: 8.34
- Strikeouts: 18
- Stats at Baseball Reference

Teams
- San Diego Padres (2016); Orix Buffaloes (2021–2022)

Career highlights and awards
- NPB: Japan Series champion (2022)
Medals
Men's baseball
Representing Mexico
World Baseball Classic
Bronze medal – third place	2023 Miami	Team

César Vargas (born December 30, 1991) is a Mexican professional baseball pitcher for El Águila de Veracruz of the Mexican League. He has previously played in the Major League Baseball (MLB) for the San Diego Padres and in Nippon Professional Baseball (NPB) for the Orix Buffaloes.

== Career ==
=== New York Yankees ===
Vargas signed with the New York Yankees as an international free agent on May 30, 2009. He made his professional debut with the Dominican Summer League Yankees, recording a 3.50 ERA and 30 strikeouts in 16 appearances. Vargas spent the following two seasons back with the DSL Yankees, pitching to a 2.06 ERA with 34 strikeouts over 14 appearances in 2010, and a 2.39 ERA with 85 strikeouts across 15 starts in 2011. In 2012, Vargas split the season between the rookie-level Gulf Coast League Yankees and the Single-A Charleston RiverDogs, registering a combined 3-2 record and 3.13 ERA with 38 strikeouts in 13 games.

Vargas split the next season between the High-A Tampa Yankees and Charleston, pitching to a 4-8 record and 4.10 ERA with 92 strikeouts between the two affiliates. Vargas split the 2014 season between Tampa and Charleston, posting a 4-2 record and 2.58 ERA with 76 strikeouts in 44 appearances. He split the 2015 season between the Double-A Trenton Thunder and the Triple-A Scranton/Wilkes-Barre RailRiders, recording a 6-0 record and 3.08 ERA with 76 strikeouts and five saves between the two affiliates. Vargas elected free agency following the season on November 6, 2015.

=== San Diego Padres ===
On November 20, 2015, Vargas signed a major league contract with the San Diego Padres. On April 23, 2016, he was called up to the major leagues to start in place of the injured Robbie Erlin, making his MLB debut. After making six starts for the Padres, Vargas went on the disabled list with a sore elbow.

Vargas was designated for assignment by the Padres on March 31, 2017. He cleared waivers and was sent outright to the Double–A San Antonio Missions on April 5. After splitting the season between San Antonio and the Triple-A El Paso Chihuahuas, he elected free agency on November 6.

=== Washington Nationals ===
On December 18, 2017, Vargas signed a minor league deal with the Washington Nationals organization. He was assigned to the Triple-A Syracuse Chiefs for the 2018 season. Vargas split the season between Syracuse and the Double-A Harrisburg Senators, pitching to a 2-8 record and 5.14 ERA in 22 games. He elected free agency on November 2, 2018.

=== Sultanes de Monterrey ===
On April 3, 2019, Vargas signed with the Sultanes de Monterrey of the Mexican League. He made 32 appearances (18 starts) for Monterrey, compiling an 8-6 record and 4.34 ERA with 92 strikeouts across 114 innings pitched. Vargas did not play in a game in 2020 due to the cancellation of the Mexican League season because of the COVID-19 pandemic.

=== Ibaraki Astroplanets ===
On December 16, 2020, Vargas signed with the Ibaraki Astroplanets of the Japanese independent Baseball Challenge League.

=== Sultanes de Monterrey (second stint) ===
On July 5, 2021, it was announced that Vargas had left the Astroplanets and re-signed with the Sultanes de Monterrey of the Mexican League. In two starts for Monterrey, he posted a 1-0 record and 2.70 ERA with 10 strikeouts over 10 innings of work.

=== Orix Buffaloes ===
On August 21, 2021, Vargas signed with the Orix Buffaloes of the Nippon Professional Baseball (NPB) for $100,000 USD plus incentives. In five appearances down the stretch for Orix, he struggled to an 11.00 ERA and 1-1 record with seven strikeouts over nine innings of work.

Vargas made eight relief appearances for the Buffaloes in 2022, logging an 0-1 record and 6.59 ERA with 11 strikeouts across 13 2/3 innings pitched. Vargas was not retained following the season and became a free agent.

=== Sultanes de Monterrey (third stint) ===
On February 10, 2023, Vargas signed with the Sultanes de Monterrey of the Mexican League. In 10 games (six starts) for Monterrey, he logged a 2–0 record and 3.69 ERA with 28 strikeouts across 31 2/3 innings pitched. Vargas did not appear in a game in the 2024 season.

Vargas made 15 appearances (including 12 starts) for the Sultanes in 2025, posting a 4–3 record and 4.78 ERA with 40 strikeouts across 58 1/3 innings pitched.

=== Pericos de Puebla ===
On January 12, 2026, Vargas was traded to the Pericos de Puebla of the Mexican League. In 18 relief appearances for the Pericos, he posted a 2–0 record with a 8.56 ERA and 14 strikeouts in 13 2/3 innings pitched. On June 17, Vargas was waived by Puebla.

=== El Águila de Veracruz ===
On June 20, 2026, Vargas was claimed off waivers by El Águila de Veracruz of the Mexican League.

== International career ==
On February 26, 2019, He was selected Mexico national baseball team at 2019 exhibition games against Japan.
