= Jake Smith (pitcher, born 1990) =

American baseball player (born 1990)

- Pitcher
- Born: June 2, 1990 (age 36); North Augusta, South Carolina, U.S.
- Batted: Right Threw: Right

MLB debut
- September 7, 2016, for the San Diego Padres

Last MLB appearance
- September 29, 2016, for the San Diego Padres

MLB statistics
- Win–loss record: 1–0
- Earned run average: 4.50
- Strikeouts: 3
- Stats at Baseball Reference

Teams
- San Diego Padres (2016)

Jacob Smith (born June 2, 1990) is an American former professional baseball pitcher. He played in Major League Baseball (MLB) for the San Diego Padres in 2016.

== Early life and education ==
Smith, from North Augusta, South Carolina, was homeschooled through high school and played high school baseball for a team of home schooled students from the Central Savannah River Area. He then enrolled at Darton State College, where he played college baseball. While in college, Smith volunteered as a groundskeeper for the Augusta GreenJackets, the Class A affiliate of the San Francisco Giants, from 2009 through 2011. Eventually he got set up with a bullpen session with Steve Kline, Augusta's pitching coach at the time, who thought Smith had a projectable frame. He threw for Felipe Alou, a special assistant for the Giants, who attempted to sign Smith. Smith instead opted to transfer to Campbell University to continue his college baseball career.

== Career ==
=== San Francisco Giants ===
The San Francisco Giants drafted Smith in the 48th round, with the 1,467th overall selection, of the 2011 Major League Baseball draft.

In 2015, while pitching for the San Jose Giants of the High–A California League, Smith pitched to a 4–4 win-loss record, 16 saves, a 2.35 earned run average, and 118 strikeouts in 84 innings pitched. Smith was named the Minor League Baseball Relief Pitcher of the Year. On November 20, 2015, the Giants added Smith to their 40-man roster to protect him from the Rule 5 draft. He was designated for assignment by the Giants on June 30, 2016, to make way for the promoted Grant Green. Smith had pitched to a 2–1 win-loss record and a 7.08 ERA in 20 1/3 innings for the Richmond Flying Squirrels of the Double–A Eastern League.

=== San Diego Padres ===
On July 6, 2016, the San Diego Padres claimed Smith off of waivers and assigned him to the San Antonio Missions of the Double–A Texas League. On September 7, Smith was promoted to the major leagues for the first time. He made his major league debut in the 8th inning of a September 7 home game against the Boston Red Sox, and on his first pitch, Hanley Ramírez hit a home run. In 4 games during his rookie campaign, Smith compiled a 4.50 ERA with 3 strikeouts over 4 innings pitched. On October 26, Smith was removed from the 40–man roster and sent outright to the Triple–A El Paso Chihuahuas.

Smith spent the 2017 split between the rookie–level Arizona League Padres, High–A Lake Elsinore Storm, San Antonio, and El Paso, accumulating a combined 3.04 ERA with 33 strikeouts across 26 2/3 innings of work. He was released by the Padres organization on December 13, 2017.
