= Robbie Erlin =

American baseball player (born 1990)

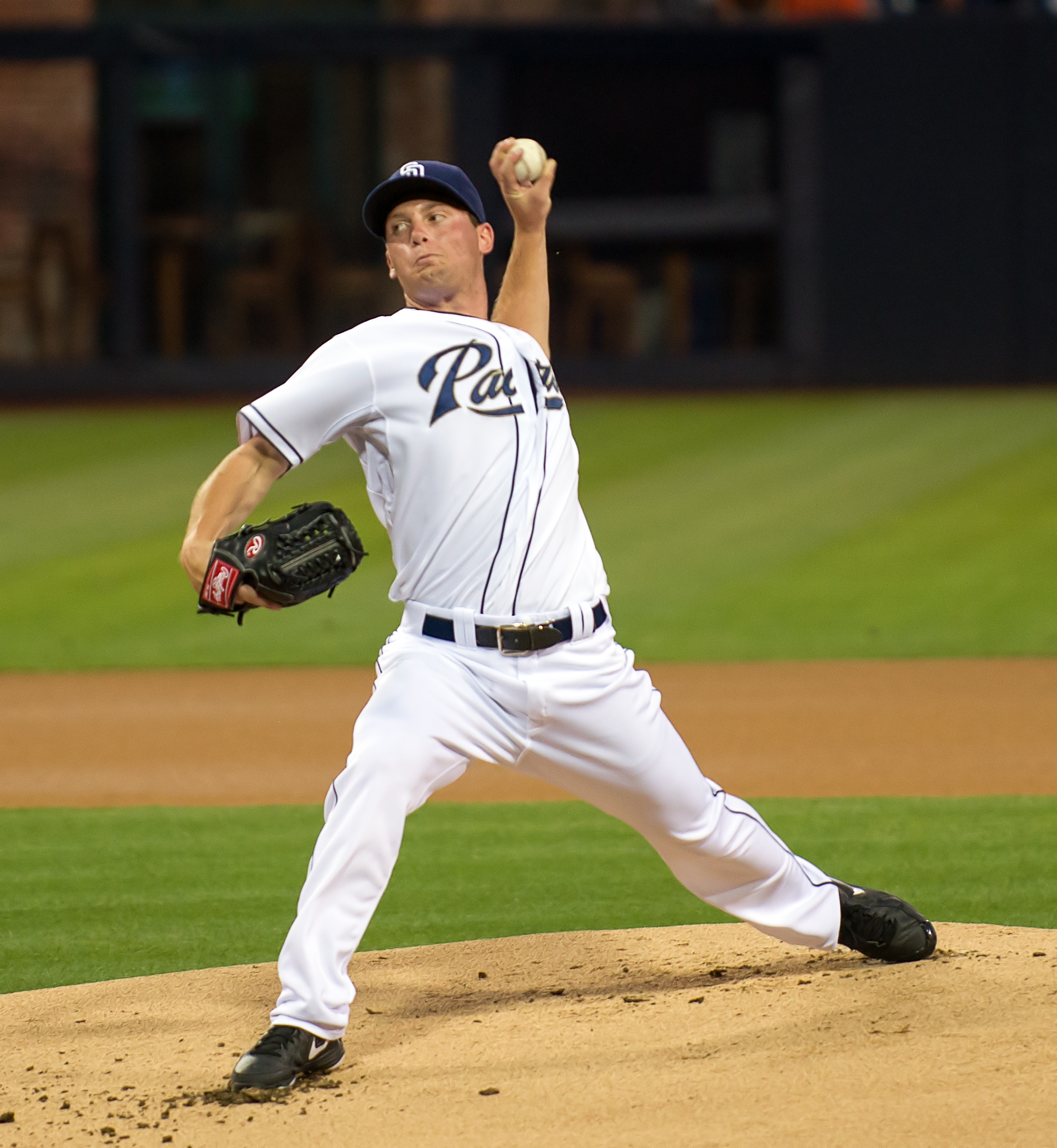
- Erlin with the San Diego Padres in 2013
- Pitcher
- Born: October 8, 1990 (age 35); Oakland, California, U.S.
- Batted: Right Threw: Left

Professional debut
- MLB: April 30, 2013, for the San Diego Padres
- NPB: April 17, 2021, for the Hokkaido Nippon-Ham Fighters

Last appearance
- NPB: September 18, 2021, for the Hokkaido Nippon Ham Fighters
- MLB: May 9, 2022, for the Los Angeles Dodgers

MLB statistics
- Win–loss record: 13–20
- Earned run average: 4.87
- Strikeouts: 275

NPB statistics
- Win–loss record: 2–4
- Earned run average: 4.39
- Strikeouts: 46
- Stats at Baseball Reference

Teams
- San Diego Padres (2013–2016, 2018–2019); Pittsburgh Pirates (2020); Atlanta Braves (2020); Hokkaido Nippon-Ham Fighters (2021); Los Angeles Dodgers (2022)

Robert Joseph Erlin (born October 8, 1990) is an American former professional baseball pitcher. He has previously played in Major League Baseball (MLB) for the San Diego Padres, Pittsburgh Pirates, Atlanta Braves, and Los Angeles Dodgers, and in Nippon Professional Baseball (NPB) for the Hokkaido Nippon-Ham Fighters.

== High school career ==
Erlin attended Scotts Valley High School in Scotts Valley, California, where he played for the school's baseball team. In 2009, his senior year, he was named Santa Cruz County's Player of the Year. He committed to attend California Polytechnic State University (Cal Poly) on a baseball scholarship.

== Professional career ==
=== Texas Rangers ===
The Texas Rangers selected Erlin in the third round of the 2009 MLB draft. Erlin signed, bypassing the scholarship with Cal Poly. Erlin spent 2010 in Class-A ball and split 2011 between High-A and Double-A.

=== San Diego Padres ===
Texas traded Erlin along with fellow Double-A pitcher Joe Wieland to the Padres for reliever Mike Adams at the non-waiver trade deadline on July 31, 2011.

Erlin was placed with the Double-A San Antonio Missions to finish the 2011 season, where he had a 1.38 ERA in six starts. He opened the 2012 season with San Antonio, but strained his elbow and developed tendinitis, making his last start for the team on May 12. He rehabbed the elbow late in the season with the Arizona Rookie League, and then pitched in the Arizona Fall League. Erlin joined the Tucson Padres of the Class AAA Pacific Coast League for the 2013 season. He shuttled back and forth between Tucson and the Major League team, posting an 8-3 record and 5.07 ERA in 20 games with Tucson in 2013.

In 2014 with three Padres minor league teams, he was 0-1 with a 5.87 ERA.

In 2015 with El Paso, where he spent most of the season, he was 7-6 with a 5.60 ERA.

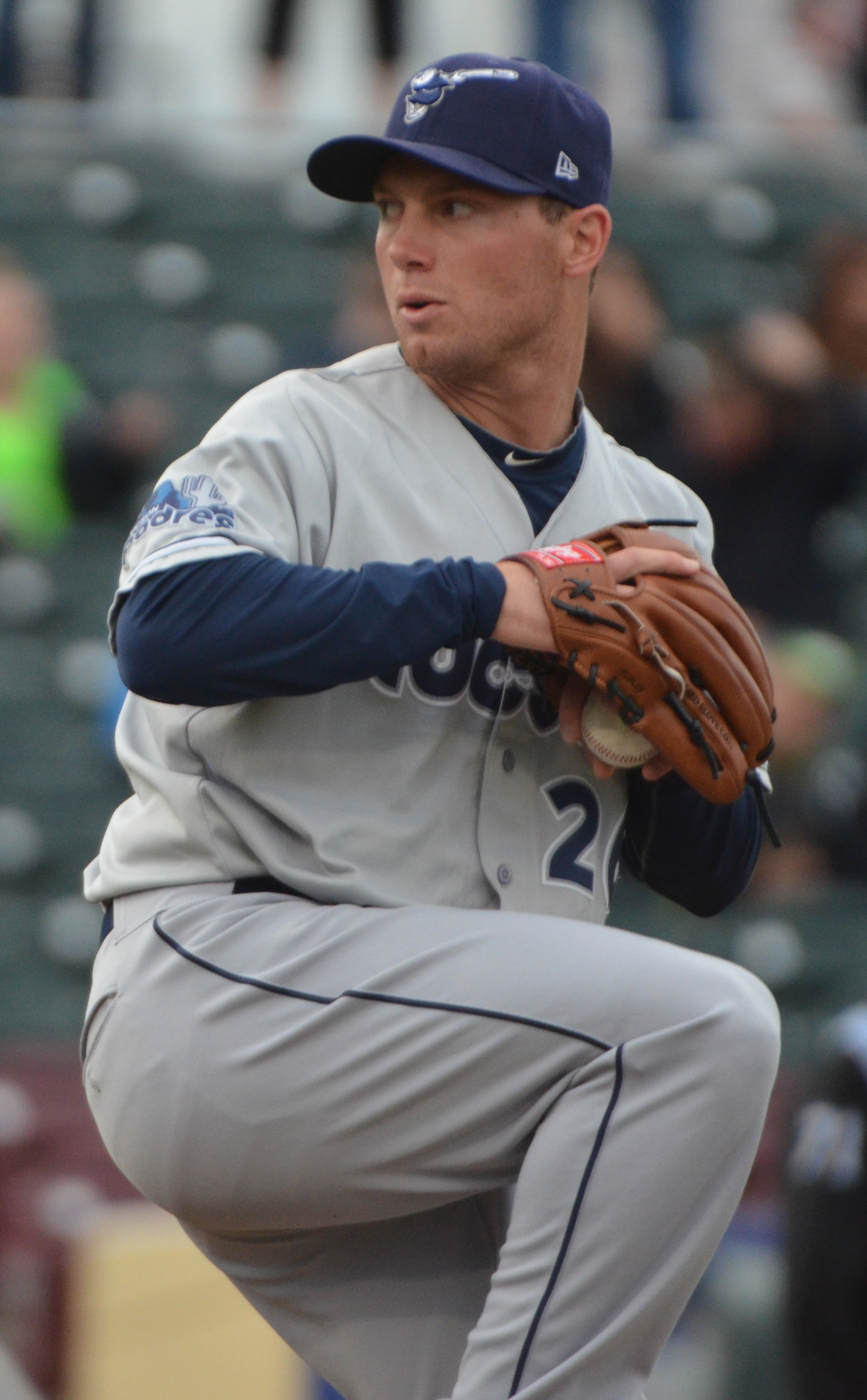
Erlin pitching for the Tucson Padres in 2013

Erlin was promoted to the Major Leagues on April 24, 2013, and made two appearances in relief before he was optioned back to Tucson on May 2. Erlin was recalled on June 1 for his first Major League start against the Toronto Blue Jays. Erlin won the first decision of his career in that start as the Padres defeated the Toronto Blue Jays, 4–3. He was optioned back to Tucson on June 2. Erlin was promoted for a third stint on June 26 to take the rotation spot of Clayton Richard, who went to the disabled list. Erlin was roughed up in successive starts in Boston and Washington in July, unable to get through the fifth inning in either start, and was optioned back to Tucson on July 8. Erlin was recalled late in the season to take the rotation spot of Edinson Vólquez. He fared better in his final stint of 2013, not allowing more than two runs in any of his five starts to finish the season. For the year, he went 3–3 with a 4.12 ERA with the Major League club.

In 2014 with the Padres, he was 4-5 with a 4.99 ERA. He missed most of the season with left elbow soreness. In 2015 with San Diego, he was 1-2 with a 4.76 ERA.

On May 3, 2016, Erlin was diagnosed with a partially torn UCL. He underwent Tommy John surgery on his left elbow that month and missed the remainder of the 2016 season. For the season, in 15.2 innings he was 1-2 with a 4.02 ERA. Following the non-tenders of Alexi Amarista and Tyson Ross after the 2016 MLB season, Erlin became the longest tenured Padre.

Erlin returned to the Padres in 2018, making the Opening Day roster as a long reliever out of the bullpen. He moved to the starting rotation full-time after Tyson Ross and Jordan Lyles were waived. In 39 appearances (12 starts), he finished 4-7 with an ERA of 4.21 in 109 innings. In 2019, Erlin recorded an ERA of 5.37 in 55 1/3 innings. He became a free agent following the 2019 season.

=== Pittsburgh Pirates ===
On January 29, 2020, Erlin signed a minor league deal with the Pittsburgh Pirates. On July 20, 2020, Erlin had his contract selected to the 40-man roster. Erlin was designated for assignment on August 2.

=== Atlanta Braves ===
On August 7, 2020, the Atlanta Braves claimed Erlin off waivers from the Pittsburgh Pirates. Erlin was designated for assignment by the Braves on September 12, 2020. Erlin was released by the Braves on September 14.

=== Hokkaido Nippon-Ham Fighters ===
On November 30, 2020, Erlin signed a one-year contract with the Hokkaido Nippon-Ham Fighters of Nippon Professional Baseball. Erlin made his NPB debut on April 17, 2021, allowing an earned run in two innings of work. He became a free agent following the 2021 season.

=== Los Angeles Dodgers ===
Erlin signed a minor league contract with the Los Angeles Dodgers on February 14, 2022. He was assigned to the Triple-A Oklahoma City Dodgers and was called up to the major leagues on May 7 as the 27th man for a doubleheader. He pitched two innings for the Dodgers over two games, allowing two runs on two hits before he was designated for assignment on May 11. He pitched in 21 games for Oklahoma City (14 starts) and was 5–4 with a 7.36 ERA.

On February 3, 2023, Erlin re-signed with the Dodgers on a minor league contract. He returned to Oklahoma City, where he pitched in 17 games (16 starts) and logged a 4–2 record and 5.83 ERA. Erlin elected free agency following the season on November 6.

== Pitching style ==
Erlin has an average fastball in the 88 to 90 miles per hour (142 to 145 km/h) range, but he is able to contrast it with an effective curveball and above-average changeup. He will also mix in cutters and sliders to give hitters a different look.

== Personal life ==
Erlin's father, Rick, is the baseball coach at Scotts Valley.
