= George Spangenberg =

American naval aeronautical engineer (1912–2000)

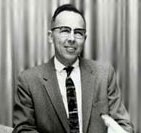
- Born: George Albert Spangenberg; June 22, 1912; Duluth, Minnesota, U.S.
- Died: November 13, 2000 (aged 88); McLean, Virginia, U.S.
- Education: University of Michigan
- Spouse: Lillie King Snow
- Relatives: Craig Spangenberg (brother); Nancy Ann Spangenberg (daughter); Judith Bea Spangenberg (daughter)

George Spangenberg (June 22, 1912 – November 13, 2000) was head of aircraft design in the United States Navy's Naval Air Systems Command.

He participated in the design and development of the original VFX/F-14 Tomcat, and selection of the YF-17 and design of the F/A-18 Hornet for the US Navy.

He has posted memoirs of this experiences on the web of how the F-14 Tomcat was designed to rectify the lack of maneuverability and performance of the F-111B. Jim Foster, a U.S. Navy fighter pilot who commanded a group specifically charged with developing Navy aircraft, states that Spangenberg believes that the Hornet can or should not have been scaled up to replace the Tomcat, and that the Navy could have done better than being forced to choose one of the Lightweight Fighter entries. Both Foster and Spangenberg believe the further development of the Hornet and Super Hornet over the Grumman Tomcat was made as primarily a political decision at the cost of combat capability.

He died on November 13, 2000, in an automobile accident.
