= Kevin Quackenbush =

American baseball player (born 1988)

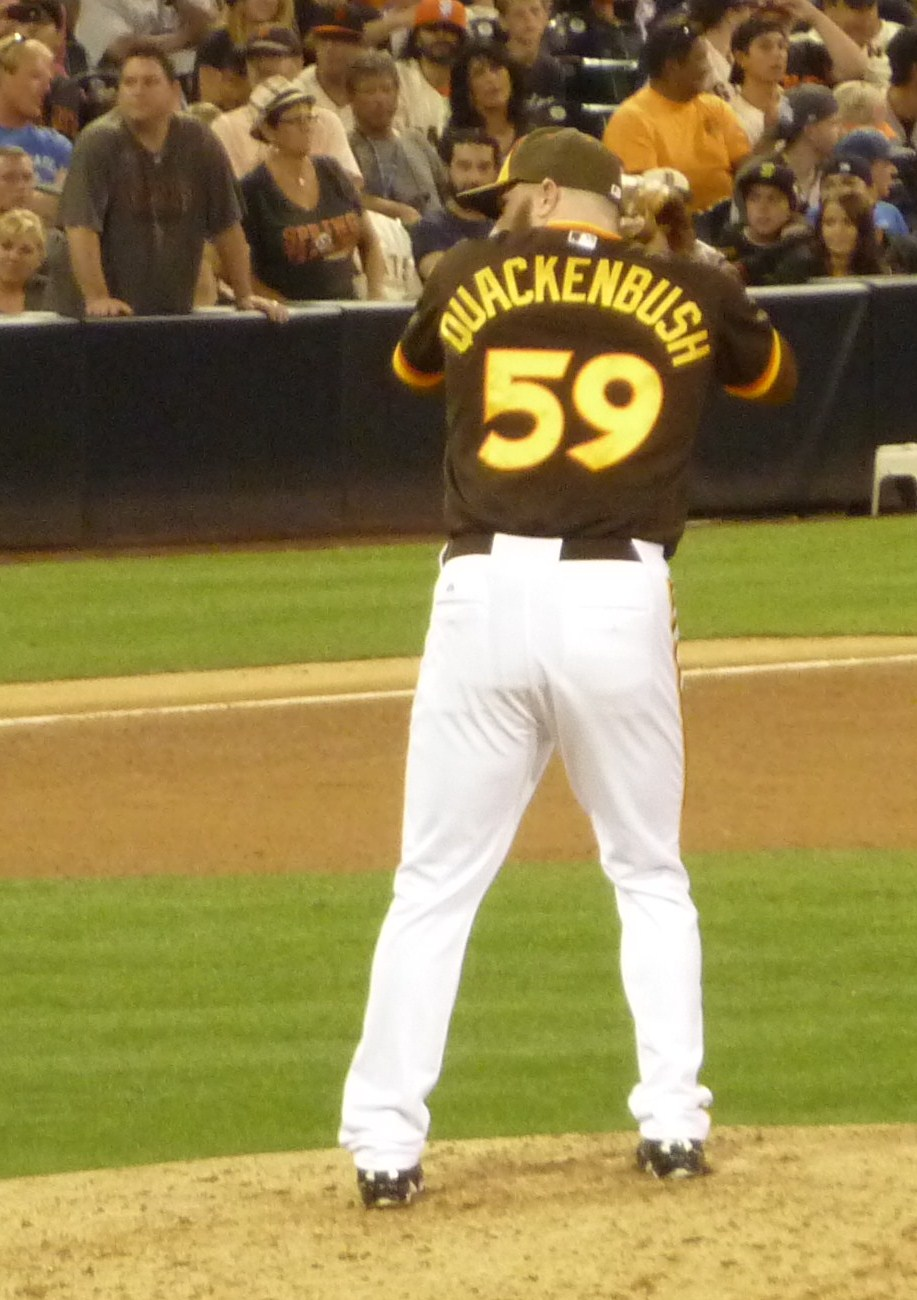
- Quackenbush pitching for the Padres in 2014
- Relief pitcher
- Born: November 28, 1988 (age 37); Land O' Lakes, Florida, U.S.
- Batted: Right Threw: Right

MLB debut
- April 25, 2014, for the San Diego Padres

Last MLB appearance
- August 8, 2021, for the Los Angeles Dodgers

MLB statistics
- Win–loss record: 13–15
- Earned run average: 4.41
- Strikeouts: 187
- Stats at Baseball Reference

Teams
- San Diego Padres (2014–2017); Cincinnati Reds (2018); Los Angeles Dodgers (2021)

Kevin Robert Quackenbush (born November 28, 1988) is an American former professional baseball pitcher. He played in Major League Baseball (MLB) for the San Diego Padres, Cincinnati Reds, and Los Angeles Dodgers.

== Career ==
Quackenbush attended Jesuit High School in Tampa, Florida, and the University of South Florida, where he played college baseball for the South Florida Bulls baseball team as their closer. Quackenbush was named a second team All-American in 2011.

=== San Diego Padres ===
The Padres selected him in the eighth round of the 2011 MLB draft. In his first season with the organization, he split his playing time between the Class A short-season Eugene Emeralds and Class A Fort Wayne TinCaps. The Padres promoted Quackenbush to Class AAA in 2013 and invited him to spring training in 2014.

Quackenbush was called up to the majors for the first time on April 25, 2014, and made his debut that day. The following month, he picked up his first major league win. On August 19, he recorded his first major league save.

On September 1, 2017, he was designated for assignment. On September 6, he cleared waivers, and San Diego outrighted him to El Paso. He became a free agent following the season.

In 2017 with the Padres, he was 0–2 with a 7.86 ERA in 20 games.

=== Cincinnati Reds ===
On November 8, 2017, Quackenbush signed a minor league deal with the Cincinnati Reds organization. He had his contract purchased on March 28, 2018. He was designated for assignment on April 24, 2018. He declared free agency on October 3, 2018.

=== Los Angeles Dodgers ===
On November 13, 2018, Quackenbush signed a minor league contract with the Los Angeles Dodgers. He was assigned to the Triple–A Oklahoma City Dodgers and was selected to the Pacific Coast League team at the Triple-A All-Star Game. In 54 total appearances for the OKC Dodgers, Quackenbush logged a 5.06 ERA with 85 strikeouts and 11 saves across 58 2/3 innings pitched. He elected free agency following the season on November 4, 2019.

=== Washington Nationals ===
On January 27, 2020, Quackenbush signed a minor league deal with the Washington Nationals. Quackenbush was released by the Nationals organization on September 1, 2020.

=== Los Angeles Dodgers (second stint) ===
On May 1, 2021, Quackenbush signed a minor league contract with the Los Angeles Dodgers organization. He was assigned to the Triple-A Oklahoma City Dodgers to begin the season and was called up to the major leagues on August 7. He made his first MLB appearance in three years the following day, August 8, against the Los Angeles Angels. He struck out the first batter he faced before allowing two singles and a double and was removed from the game after only 1/3 of an inning. That was the only game he appeared in before he was designated for assignment by the Dodgers on August 12. He appeared in 45 games in Triple–A with a 1–7 record, 1.65 ERA and 23 saves. On October 8, Quackenbush elected free agency.

=== Toros de Tijuana ===
On January 16, 2022, Quackenbush signed with the Toros de Tijuana of the Mexican League for the 2022 season. He was released on July 14, 2022.

=== Long Island Ducks ===
On May 2, 2023, Quackenbush signed with the Long Island Ducks of the Atlantic League of Professional Baseball. In 40 games for Long Island, he struggled to a 7.08 ERA with 41 strikeouts and 14 saves across 40 2/3 innings of work. On February 2, 2024, Quackenbush retired from professional baseball.

== Coaching career ==
=== Atlanta Braves organization ===
In 2025, Quackenbush was named assistant pitching coach of the FCL Braves the rookie level affiliate of the Atlanta Braves.
