= Craig Spangenberg =

American lawyer

- Born: Charles Craig Spangenberg; February 18, 1914; Yonkers, New York, U.S.
- Died: March 17, 1998 (aged 84); Chagrin Falls, Ohio, U.S.
- Education: University of Michigan
- Spouse(s): Elizabeth J. Flansburg; Helen J. Schnierer
- Relatives: George Spangenberg (brother); Annie Duke (granddaughter)

Craig Spangenberg (February 18, 1914 – March 17, 1998) was an American nationally renowned trial attorney who founded the law firm now known as Spangenberg, Shibley & Liber in Cleveland, Ohio.

== Education ==
Craig Spangenberg earned his undergraduate and law degrees from the University of Michigan in the 1930s. The University of Michigan Law School awards the Craig Spangenberg Oral Advocacy Award in recognition of his trial advocacy legacy.

Spangenberg was admitted to the Ohio bar in 1938. In 1946, Spangenberg became a founding member of the Harrison Thomas, Spangenberg and Hull law firm now known as Spangenberg, Shibley and Liber.

== Legal practice ==
Spangenberg specialized in personal injury litigation. He gained national recognition for his firm by stepping forward to represent Canadian children injured by the birth-defect-causing morning sickness medication Thalidomide. He was appointed Canadian Queen's Counsel by Queen Elizabeth II as a result of this work.

Spangenberg served as the dean of the International Academy of Trial Lawyers in 1962.

Spangenberg founded and served as the first president of the International Society of Barristers. Established in 1965, the ISOB is an honor society of outstanding trial lawyers chosen by their peers on the basis of excellence and integrity in advocacy.

== Family ==
Spangenberg was born in Yonkers, N.Y. to Albert F. Spangenberg and Beatrice (Jenkins) Spangenberg.

Spangenberg married Elizabeth Jane Flansburg on 19 Nov 1937. They had two children. They subsequently divorced. He married Helen J. Schnierer on 11 Dec 1947, and together they had two children. Spangenberg died in Lyndhurst, OH and is buried at the Evergreen Hill Cemetery in Chagrin Falls, OH. His granddaughter is former World Series of Poker champion Annie Duke.

== Awards ==
In 2013, Spangenberg was inducted into the Trial Lawyer Hall of Fame, managed by Trial Lawyer Magazine.

== Notable arguments and trial techniques ==
=== Eggshell victim argument ===
Spangenberg the trial advocate developed the "eggshell victim" argument, which suggested that you must take your victim as you find them, regardless of whether they were more vulnerable or easily injured than "average" people. The argument went as follows, as recounted by James W. McElhaney in the American Bar Association Journal:

"We come to the subject of damages, and it's a difficult area of decision. Oh, I wish this were a simpler case like a farmer driving his pickup truck on a country road when someone speeds through the stop sign, runs into his truck and turns it over.

"The farmer's not hurt, but his truck is. One side's all dented in, the windshield is broken out and a fender is torn off. And if you as a jury were asked, 'What's fair compensation for what the driver of the car did to the farmer's truck?' you wouldn't have any problem with that.

"You'd give him the kind of truck he had. You wouldn't give him a new truck, because he didn't have one. But he shouldn't have to drive a truck that's all bent up and missing a windshield, because he didn't have that, either. So fair compensation--just compensation--would be to pay him what it would cost to fix the truck he has. And I'm sure that my friend for the defense would accept that.

"Well, now suppose that the plaintiff is a poultry farmer and he has the back of his truck filled with eggs, three-hundred dozen grade A eggs, all carefully boxed and crated. And the defendant speeds through the stop sign, just like he did in this case. As a result you have three-hundred dozen grade A whites and yolks running all over the pavement. "What is fair compensation? Those are his eggs. They were marketable. His property has been taken away. His income has been taken away.

"What is fair compensation? Ninety-six cents a dozen retail?

"No. He wasn't going to sell them retail. He was going to sell them wholesale, and the wholesale price reported in the newspaper was forty-seven cents a dozen. So he's entitled to forty-seven cents times three hundred. One hundred and forty-one dollars. Now, in this situation, wouldn't you think the defense lawyer had taken leave of his senses if he told you, 'Don't you pay him a hundred and forty-one dollars for those eggs! Why, if they'd been golf balls, not one would be broken.'

"I'm not telling you Mike Wilson was an egg, but he was like an egg. He was fragile. But he was still useful and marketable. He was able to sell what strength he had in the marketplace of labor.

"But he certainly was not a golf ball, and when the defendant sped through the stop sign and hit Mike Wilson, he did not bounce.

"And fair compensation is to restore the loss that has actually been inflicted on the actual man or woman. Just like when you break an actual egg, fair compensation is paying the actual value."
