= Spangenberg Castle =

Spangenberg Castle may refer to the following castles in Germany:

- Spangenberg Castle (Hesse), a former castle and 2nd World War POW camp, in the state of Hesse
- Spangenberg Castle (Rhineland-Palatinate) in the Palatinate Forest in the state of Rhineland-Palatinate
