= Adam Liberatore =

American baseball player (born 1987)

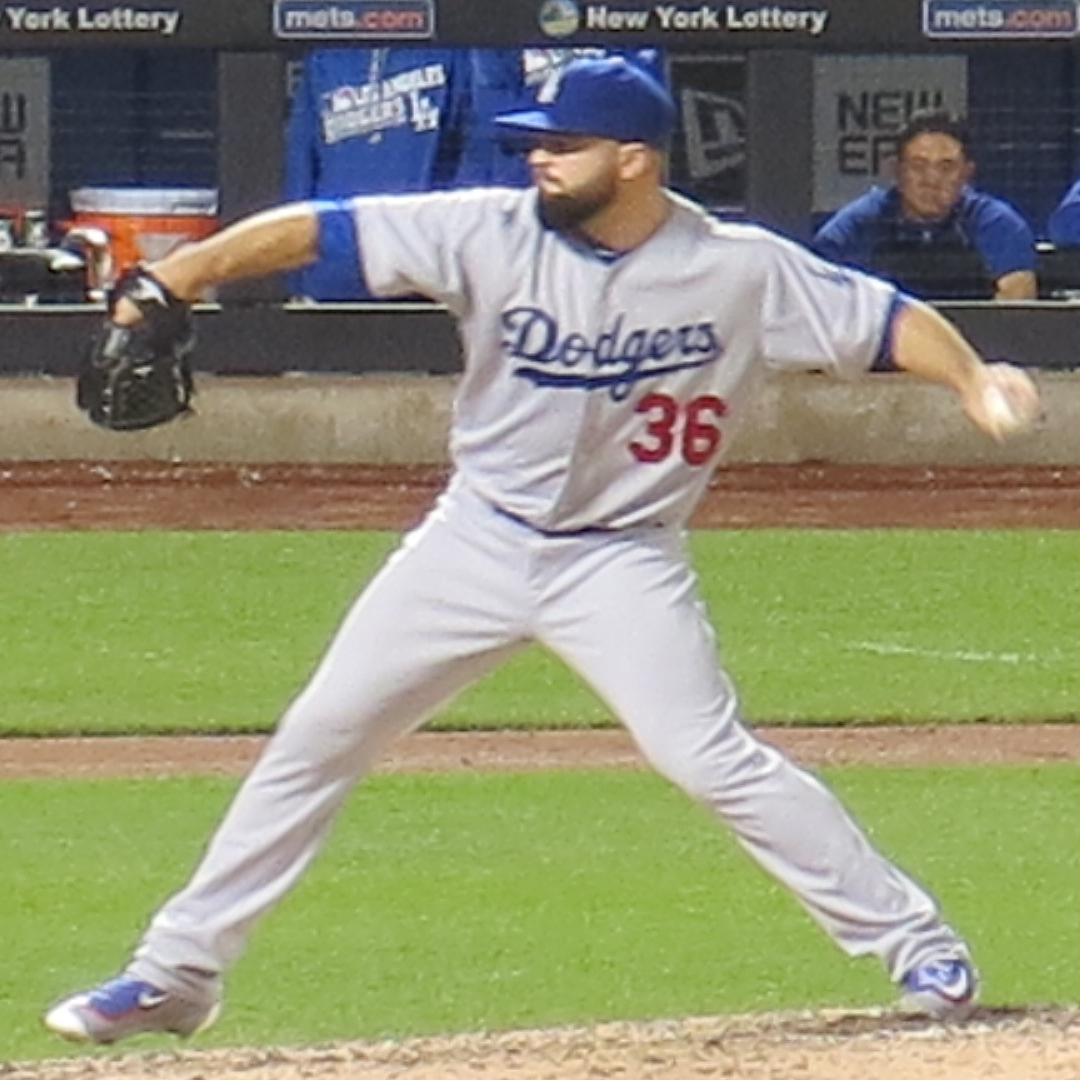
- Liberatore with the Los Angeles Dodgers in 2016
- Pitcher
- Born: May 12, 1987 (age 39); Bellflower, California, U.S.
- Batted: Left Threw: Left

MLB debut
- April 17, 2015, for the Los Angeles Dodgers

Last MLB appearance
- June 20, 2018, for the Los Angeles Dodgers

MLB statistics
- Win–loss record: 6–5
- Earned run average: 3.55
- Strikeouts: 93
- Stats at Baseball Reference

Teams
- Los Angeles Dodgers (2015–2018)

Career highlights and awards
- Pitched a combined no-hitter on May 4, 2018

Adam Joseph Liberatore (born May 12, 1987) is an American former professional baseball pitcher who played in Major League Baseball (MLB) for the Los Angeles Dodgers.

== Career ==
=== Amateur ===
Liberatore is of Italian descent and attended Quigley Catholic High School in Baden, Pennsylvania, for three years, and transferred to Blackhawk High School in Chippewa Township, Pennsylvania, for his senior year. He pitched 6 1/3 innings as a senior and graduated from Blackhawk in 2005. He played for the American Legion team after his senior year and the coach thought he was more comfortable in the outfield than at pitcher. In the summer of 2005, he received a scholarship attend Tennessee Technological University and play college baseball for the Tennessee Tech Golden Eagles.

Liberatore appeared in only six games and made one start as a freshman, while allowing twelve earned runs in 10 innings. In 2007, as a sophomore, he appeared in 15 games with four starts and an 8.42 earned run average (ERA) and as a junior he had an 8.68 ERA in 13 appearances (eight starts). He participated in the Valley Baseball League over the summer between his junior and senior seasons and won the pitcher of the year honors while leading the league with a .170 batting average against. In 2009, he was 2-0 with a perfect 0.00 ERA in three starts, with 21 strikeouts when he left his last game with a season-ending elbow injury. Liberatore underwent Tommy John surgery and received a medical redshirt season. In 2010, as a redshirt senior, he was 6-4 with a 5.30 ERA in 13 starts.

=== Tampa Bay Rays ===
The Tampa Bay Rays selected Liberatore in the 21st round of the 2010 MLB draft. A starting pitcher in college, the Rays transitioned Liberatore into a relief pitcher. He made his professional debut with the Hudson Valley Renegades of the Class A-Short Season New York–Penn League in 2010, and played for the Charlotte Stone Crabs of the Class A-Advanced Florida State League in 2011. Liberatore split the 2012 season between the Montgomery Biscuits of the Class AA Southern League and the Durham Bulls of the Class AAA International League, with a combined 4-5 record and 2.47 ERA in 49 games. He played for Durham in 2013 and 2014. Liberatore had a 1.66 earned run average in the 2014 season, after which the Rays named him their Minor League Reliever of the Year.

=== Los Angeles Dodgers ===
On November 20, 2014, Liberatore was traded to the Los Angeles Dodgers, along with Joel Peralta, in exchange for Jose Dominguez and Greg Harris. He was also added to the Dodgers 40-man roster. At the conclusion of spring training, he was optioned to the Triple-A Oklahoma City Dodgers.

Liberatore began the 2015 season with the Oklahoma City Dodgers of the Triple-A Pacific Coast League. The Dodgers called him up to the major leagues for the first time on April 17, 2015. He made his debut by pitching the ninth inning against the Colorado Rockies that night, retiring all three batters he faced. Liberatore pitched in 39 games for the Dodgers with a 2–2 record and 4.25 ERA. He also pitched in 19 games for Oklahoma City, with a 3.74 ERA.

On July 9, 2016, Liberatore set a Dodgers franchise record with his 24th consecutive scoreless appearance, breaking the mark previously set by John Candelaria in 1991. In 2016, he appeared in 58 games with a 3.38 ERA. He underwent left elbow debridement surgery after the season.

Liberatore was again optioned to Oklahoma City to begin the 2017 season. After pitching in six games in the minors, he was recalled to the Dodgers on April 23. He was sidelined with a groin injury in May and then came down with left forearm tightness shortly afterwards. That injury wound up keeping him on the disabled list for the rest of the season. He only pitched 3 1/3 innings over four games for the Dodgers in 2017, allowing one run on three hits.

On May 4, 2018, against the San Diego Padres at Estadio de Béisbol Monterrey, Liberatore was one of four pitchers involved in a combined no-hitter as the Dodgers won 4–0, pitching the ninth inning to finish off the game. The Dodgers designated him for assignment on August 31, 2018 and released him on September 5. In 17 major league games in 2018, he allowed four earned runs in 13 innings for a 2.77 ERA.

== See also ==
- List of Major League Baseball no-hitters

Awards and achievements
| Preceded by Sean Manaea | No-hit game May 4, 2018 (with Buehler, Cingrani & García | Succeeded by James Paxton |
