= José Domínguez (baseball) =

Dominican baseball player (born 1990)

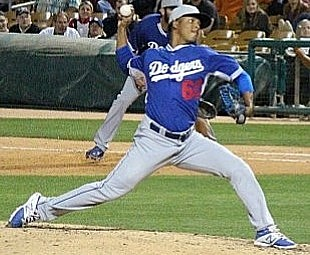
- Dominguez with the Los Angeles Dodgers

Free agent
- Relief pitcher
- Born: August 7, 1990 (age 36); San Pedro de Macoris, Dominican Republic
- Bats: Right Throws: Right

MLB debut
- June 30, 2013, for the Los Angeles Dodgers

MLB statistics (through 2016 season)
- Win–loss record: 2–0
- Earned run average: 4.82
- Strikeouts: 37
- Stats at Baseball Reference

Teams
- Los Angeles Dodgers (2013–2014); Tampa Bay Rays (2015); San Diego Padres (2016)

José Alfredo Domínguez (born August 7, 1990) is a Dominican professional baseball pitcher who is a free agent. He has previously played in Major League Baseball (MLB) for the Los Angeles Dodgers, Tampa Bay Rays, and San Diego Padres.

He was called up to the majors for the first time on June 29, 2013. He is the cousin of Álex Colomé and his fastball has been clocked at over 100 mph.

== Career ==
=== Los Angeles Dodgers ===
Domínguez was signed by the Los Angeles Dodgers for $50,000 as a 16-year-old in 2007. He pitched for the Dodgers Dominican Summer League team from 2008 to 2010. In September 2009, he was suspended 50 games for violating the Minor League Drug Prevention program, when he tested positive for stanozolol, a performance-enhancing drug.

In 2011, Domínguez moved to the U.S. based leagues and pitched for the Ogden Raptors and Arizona League Dodgers. In 2012, he began in Single–A with the Great Lakes Loons and was promoted to Double–A with the Chattanooga Lookouts.

Domínguez was suspended again, for violating the minor league drug policy in November 2012, receiving a 25-game suspension. After serving the suspension at the start of the 2013 season, he rejoined Chattanooga, where he had a 2.60 ERA in 14 games with 28 strikeouts. He was quickly promoted to the Triple–A Albuquerque Isotopes. In 8 games in Triple–A, he had 12 strikeouts in 8 innings without allowing a run.

Domínguez's contract was purchased and he was called up to the Dodgers on June 29, 2013. He made his debut in relief on June 30 against the Philadelphia Phillies and retired the 3 batters he faced. He appeared in 9 games, with a 2.16 ERA before he was shut down with a quad strain. In 2014, he again spent most of the season with the Isotopes, where he was in 31 games and had a 3.24 ERA with 10 saves. In 5 games with the Dodgers, he allowed 8 runs in 6 1/3 innings for an 11.37 ERA. He was not called up in September because he was dealing with an arm injury he suffered in the minor leagues.

=== Tampa Bay Rays ===
Domínguez was traded to the Tampa Bay Rays on November 20, 2014 (along with Greg Harris) in exchange for Joel Peralta and Adam Liberatore. He made 4 scoreless appearances for Tampa Bay, striking out 5 over 5 2/3 innings. On August 16, 2015, Domínguez was designated for assignment to clear roster space for Drew Smyly. He cleared waivers and was sent outright to the Triple-A Durham Bulls. Domínguez made 30 appearances for Durham, struggling to an 0–2 record and 6.15 ERA with 25 strikeouts across 27 2/3 innings pitched. He elected free agency following the season on November 6.

=== San Diego Padres ===
On December 23, 2015, Domínguez signed a minor league contract with the San Diego Padres. On July 1, 2016, the Padres selected Domínguez's contract, adding him to their active roster. In 34 appearances for San Diego, he compiled a 5.05 ERA with 20 strikeouts across 35 2/3 innings pitched. On October 26, Domínguez was removed from the 40–man roster and sent outright to the Triple–A El Paso Chihuahuas. However, he rejected the assignment and subsequently elected free agency.

=== Toros de Tijuana ===
On November 4, 2016, Domínguez signed a minor league contract with the San Francisco Giants. However, he did not appear for the organization in 2017 and was released on March 25, 2018.

On May 5, 2018, Domínguez signed with the Toros de Tijuana of the Mexican League. In 8 appearances for the Toros, he recorded an 0–1 record and 5.68 ERA with 5 strikeouts across 6 1/3 innings pitched. Domínguez was released by Tijuana on July 3.

=== Algodoneros de Unión Laguna ===
On April 16, 2019, Domínguez signed with the Algodoneros de Unión Laguna of the Mexican League. On April 19, during a game against the Guerreros de Oaxaca, umpires detected a foreign substance on his left arm, which appeared to be pine tar. Domínguez was ejected from the game, and later suspended for 10 games and fined an undisclosed amount for the incident. In 42 total appearances out of the bullpen for the team, he compiled a 2–2 record and 5.80 ERA with 36 strikeouts and 13 saves across 40 1/3 innings pitched. Domínguez became a free agent following the season.

=== Generales de Durango ===
On February 5, 2020, Domínguez signed with the Generales de Durango of the Mexican League. Domínguez did not play in a game in 2020 due to the cancellation of the Mexican League season because of the COVID-19 pandemic. On February 25, 2021, Domínguez was released.

=== Welland Jackfish ===
On February 5, 2025, Domínguez signed with the Welland Jackfish of the Intercounty Baseball League.
