= James W. McElhaney =

American lawyer

James W. McElhaney (1938 – 2017) was the Baker & Hostetler Distinguished Scholar in Trial Practice and Joseph C. Hostetler Professor Emeritus of Trial Practice and Advocacy at Case Western Reserve University's School of Law. He received his A.B. from Duke University in 1960, and his law degree from the Duke University School of Law in 1962. For many years, he wrote a column on trial practice for the American Bar Association Journal. James McElhaney died on October 20, 2017.
