= Alexi Amarista =

Venezuelan baseball player (born 1989)

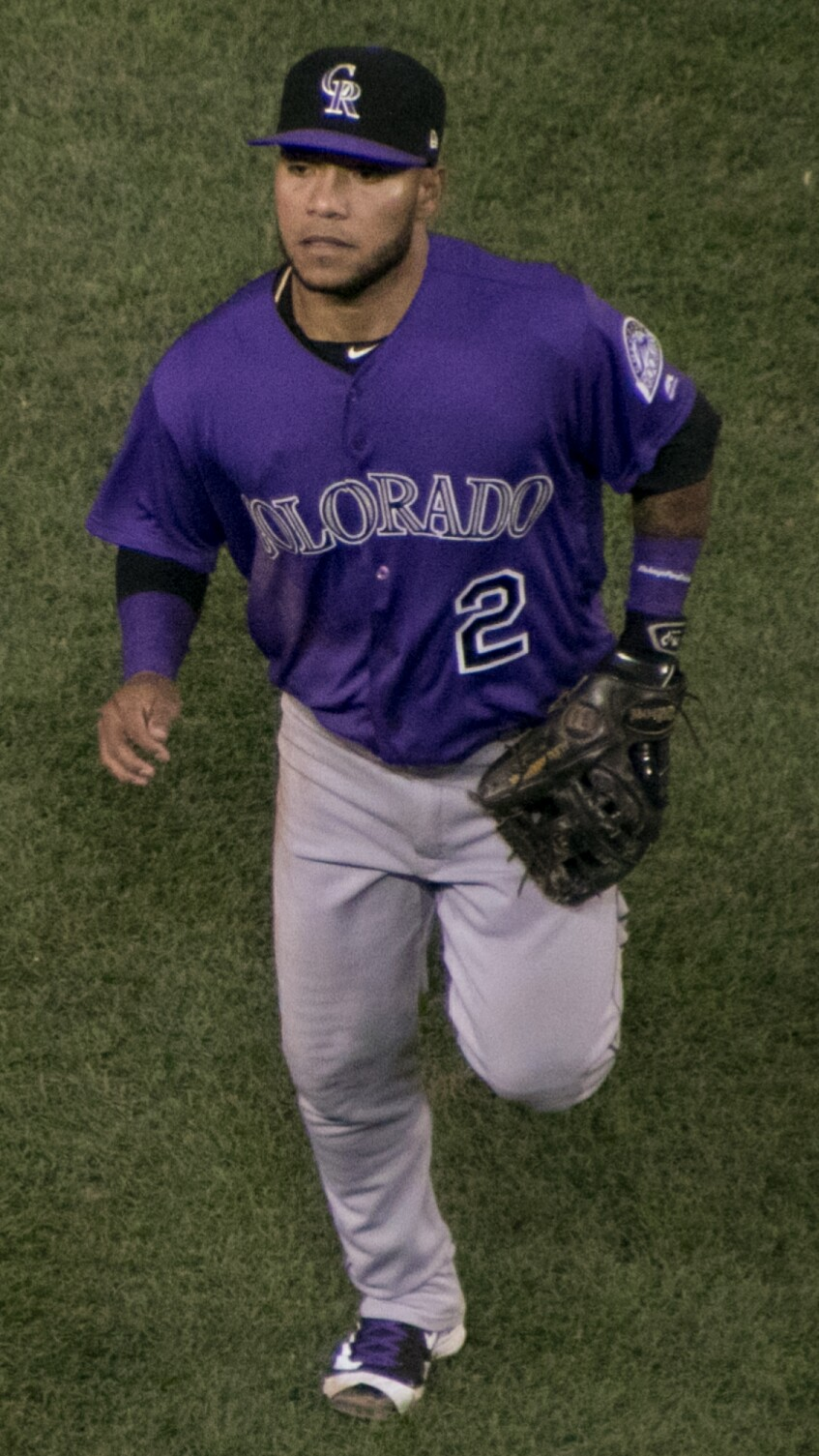
- Amarista with the Colorado Rockies

Guerreros de Oaxaca – No. 2
- Utility player
- Born: April 6, 1989 (age 37); Barcelona, Venezuela
- Bats: Left Throws: Right

MLB debut
- April 26, 2011, for the Los Angeles Angels of Anaheim

MLB statistics (through 2017 season)
- Batting average: .231
- Home runs: 21
- Runs batted in: 169
- Stats at Baseball Reference

Teams
- Los Angeles Angels of Anaheim (2011–2012); San Diego Padres (2012–2016); Colorado Rockies (2017)

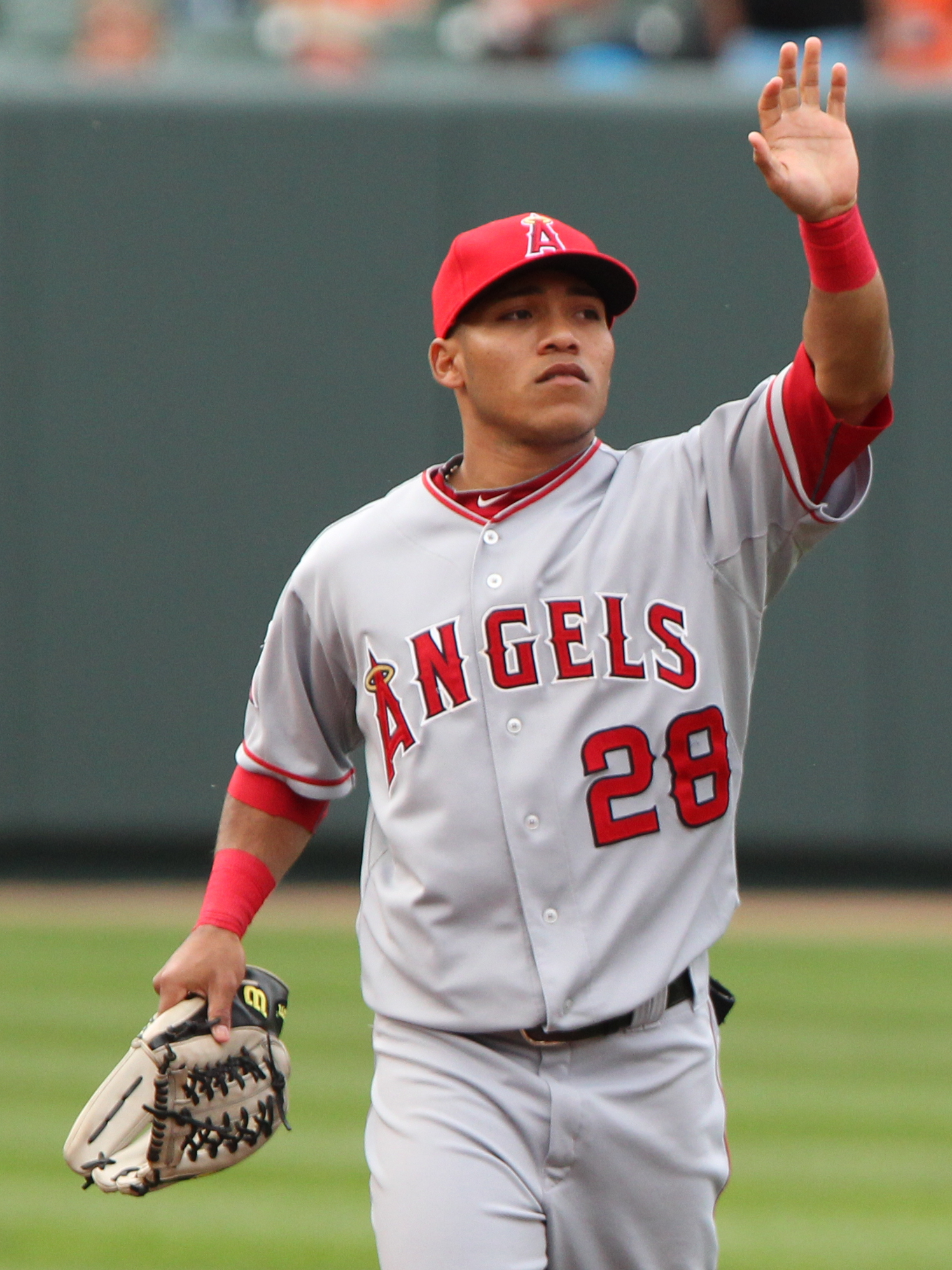
Amarista during his tenure with the Los Angeles Angels in 2011

Alexi Jose Amarista (born April 6, 1989) is a Venezuelan professional baseball utility player for the Guerreros de Oaxaca of the Mexican League. Amarista was signed by the Los Angeles Angels of Anaheim as an amateur free agent in 2007. He has previously played in Major League Baseball (MLB) for the Angels, San Diego Padres, and Colorado Rockies.

== Professional career ==
=== Los Angeles Angels of Anaheim ===
Amarista was signed by the Los Angeles Angels of Anaheim as an amateur free agent in 2007. He played in the Dominican Summer League in 2007 before playing with the rookie league AZL Angels and Single-A Cedar Rapids Kernels in 2008. He returned to Cedar Rapids in 2009, but transitioned all the way from high-A to the Triple-A level in 2010.

After starting 2011 with the Triple-A Salt Lake Bees, Amarista was called up to the majors for the first time on April 25, 2011. He made his first appearance on April 26, 2011, against the Oakland Athletics. In his first major league at bat, he doubled to drive in two runs. Amarista played in a total of 23 games with the Angels in 2011.

Amarista opened 2012 as a utility infielder on the Angels 25-man roster but only played in a single game as a pinch runner before being optioned to AAA Salt Lake on April 13.

=== San Diego Padres ===
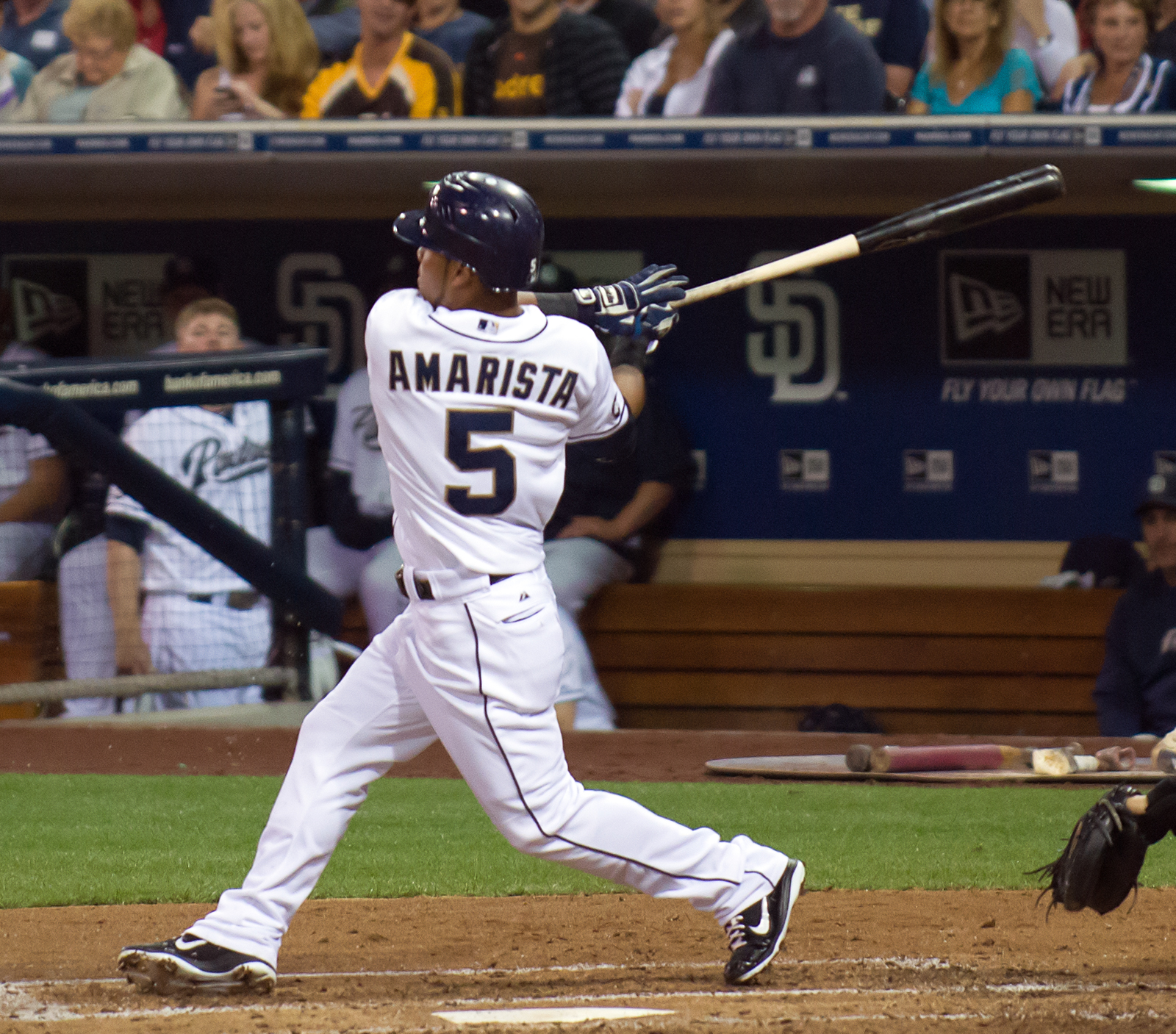
Amarista batting for the San Diego Padres in 2012

On May 3, 2012, Amarista and minor league pitcher Donn Roach were traded to the San Diego Padres for reliever Ernesto Frieri. After 11 games with the Triple-A Tucson Padres, Amarista was called up to the Padres on May 17 to play second base. Amarista was eventually supplanted by Logan Forsythe as the regular second baseman, but he continued to show his versatility by making occasional starts at second, shortstop, left field, and also in center field when Cameron Maybin was nursing a wrist injury. On June 28, 2012, Amarista hit his first career home-run, a grand slam off of Brett Myers, to cap off a six-run ninth inning in a victory against the Houston Astros. This began a brief power surge where Amarista hit 4 home runs and collected 11 RBI in five games. Amarista finished 2012 batting .240, with a .282 on-base percentage and five home runs in 275 at-bats.

Amarista served a utility role for the Padres in 2013. He took most of the starts at second base while Chase Headley was injured to begin the year, and he made 53 starts in center field with Cameron Maybin absent for the majority of the season. He finished the year starting at shortstop when Ronny Cedeño sat out and ended 2013 with 84 starts and 146 games played. Amarista batted .236 with a .282 on-base percentage and five home runs in 368 at-bats.

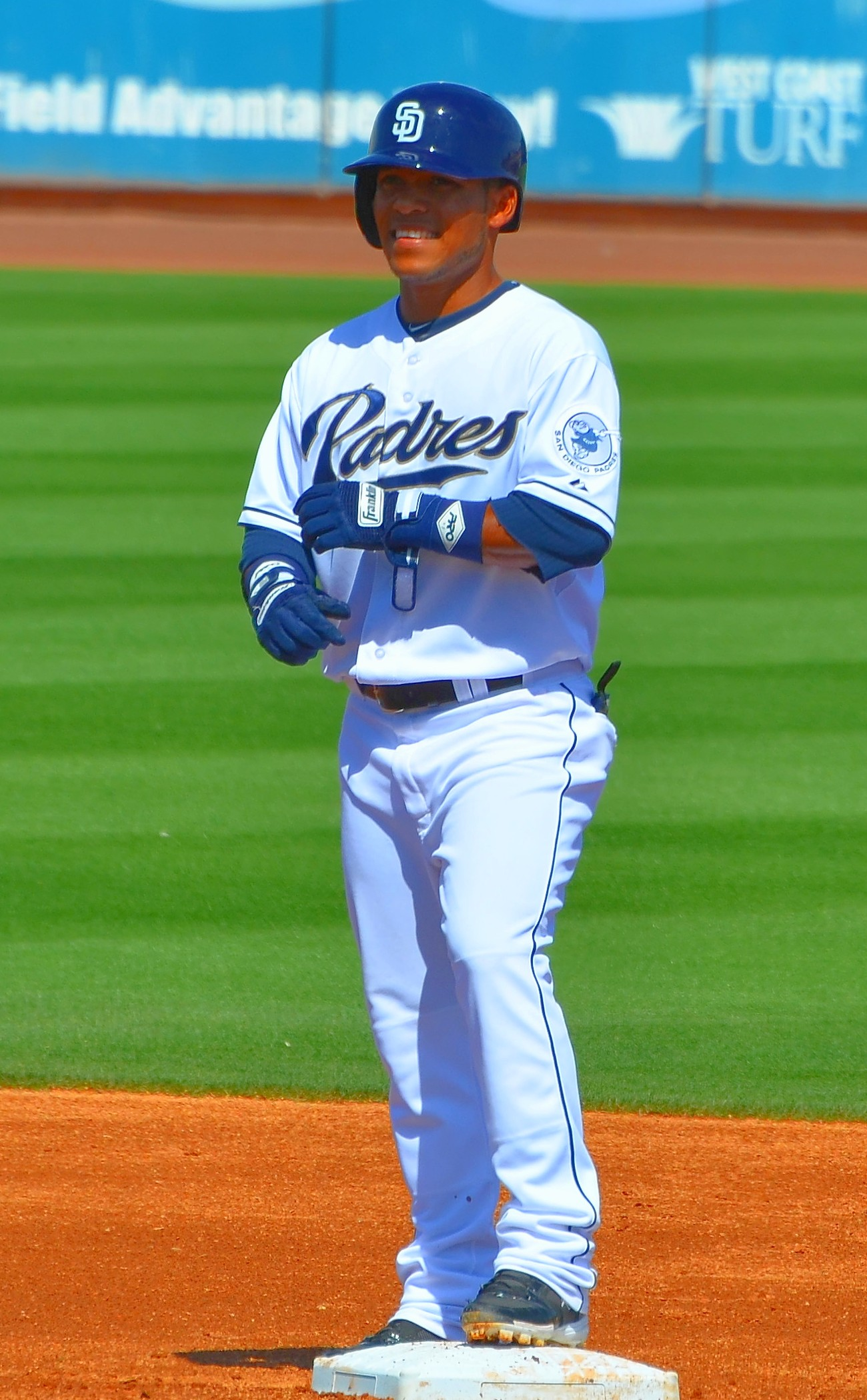
Amarista with the San Diego Padres

Amarista spent much of his time in the infield in 2014. He began the year making spot starts in center and around the infield and serving as a pinch hitter. On April 6, Amarista's birthday, he hit a 3-run pinch hit home run to defeat the Miami Marlins. Amarista picked up a handful of starts at third and second when Chase Headley was out with a strained calf in late April and early May. He saw more time at second and third in June when Jedd Gyorko was out with plantar fasciitis and Chase Headley sat with a herniated disc. When Everth Cabrera sat out with a hamstring injury on July 1, later spending significant time on the disabled list, Amarista began seeing regular time at shortstop. Amarista made 68 starts at the position from July 1 through the end of the year. He finished the season with a .239/.286/.314 batting line and five home runs, setting career highs in at-bats (423), games started (119), and games played (148).

Amarista began 2015 as the Padres everyday shortstop, splitting time with Clint Barmes. He also made a handful of starts at second base and left field later in the year. On June 17, Amarista pitched to one batter in the 8th inning of a blowout against the Oakland Athletics, retiring the only batter he faced on a flyout to right-field. For the year, he made 79 starts at short and played in 118 games overall, batting .204/.257/.287 with three home runs.

Amarista started the 2016 season with Triple-A El Paso, but was called up within the first week of the season when Yangervis Solarte went to the disabled list. Amarista himself landed on the 15-day disabled list with a right hamstring strain on April 20. On May 31, Amarista was once again brought in to pitch with 2 outs in the 8th inning of a blowout, this time against the Seattle Mariners, and retired the only batter he faced on a ground-out to second base. Amarista continued in a part-time role during June and was optioned to Triple-A on July 3. He bounced between Triple-A and the Majors in July, and then went to the disabled list after re-injuring his hamstring on August 1. Amarista returned in September in a utility role, playing the infield and outfield. He finished the season with a .257/.295/.271 batting line in 140 at-bats. He had 31 starts in the field, including at second base, shortstop, third, and left and right field.

=== Colorado Rockies ===
On January 17, 2017, Amarista signed a one-year, $1.1 million contract with the Colorado Rockies. On April 3, 2017, Amarista hit a RBI double in the eighth inning, pinch hitting for Adam Ottavino against the Milwaukee Brewers on Opening Day.

=== Philadelphia Phillies ===
On January 24, 2018, the Detroit Tigers signed Amarista to a minor league contract with a non-roster invitation to spring training. He was released on March 24, and signed a minor league contract with the Philadelphia Phillies on March 26. In 51 games for the Triple–A Lehigh Valley IronPigs, Amarista batted .238/.285/.288 with one home run and 14 RBI. He was released by the Phillies organization on July 3.

=== Tigres de Quintana Roo ===
On July 29, 2018, Amarista signed with the Tigres de Quintana Roo of the Mexican League. He was released on August 16, 2018. In 14 games he struggled hitting .228/.313/.316 with 0 home runs, 5 RBIs and 2 stolen bases.

=== New Britain Bees ===
On March 19, 2019, Amarista signed with the New Britain Bees of the Atlantic League of Professional Baseball. In 56 games he hit .270/.321/.473 with 11 home runs, 31 RBIs and 4 stolen bases.

In 2020, following the Bees' move to the Futures Collegiate Baseball League, he was drafted by the Sugar Land Skeeters in the Bees dispersal draft. Due to the cancellation of the 2020 ALPB season because of the COVID-19 pandemic, Amarista did not play for the Skeeters and became a free agent after the year.

=== El Águila de Veracruz ===
On February 10, 2021, Amarista signed with El Águila de Veracruz of the Mexican League for the 2021 season. In 59 games, Amarista slashed .369/.408/.631 with 14 home runs and 42 RBIs.

=== Gastonia Honey Hunters ===
On September 4, 2021, Amarista was loaned to the Gastonia Honey Hunters of the Atlantic League of Professional Baseball. In 34 games he hit .313/.353/.442 with 3 home runs, 17 RBIs and 6 stolen bases.

=== El Águila de Veracruz (second stint) ===
Amarista was returned to El Águila de Veracruz of the Mexican League following the 2021 season, and he later re-signed with them for the 2022 season. He played in 81 games for Veracruz, hitting .343/.396/.528 with 10 home runs and 43 RBI.

=== Guerreros de Oaxaca ===
On September 22, 2023, Amarista was traded to the Guerreros de Oaxaca of the Mexican League. In 87 appearances for Oaxaca in 2024, he slashed .361/.402/.579 with 15 home runs and 57 RBI.

In 2025, Amarista re-signed with Oaxaca for a second season. In 75 games he hit .376/.426/.633 with 16 home runs and 71 RBIs.

== Personal life ==
Amarista was given the nickname "Little Ninja" by Padres catcher John Baker because, according to Baker, "Teams don't see Amarista coming. He sneaks up on them." Amarista's height is listed variously as 5'7" or 5'8".

== See also ==
- List of Major League Baseball players from Venezuela
