= 2016 Los Angeles Dodgers season =

2016 Los Angeles Dodgers
- National League West champions
- League: National League
- Division: West
- Ballpark: Dodger Stadium
- City: Los Angeles, California
- Record: 91–71 (.562)
- Divisional place: 1st
- Owners: Guggenheim Baseball Management
- President: Stan Kasten
- President of baseball operations: Andrew Friedman
- General managers: Farhan Zaidi
- Managers: Dave Roberts
- Television: SportsNet LA (Vin Scully, Joe Davis, Charley Steiner, Orel Hershiser, Nomar Garciaparra) (Spanish audio feed) (Pepe Yñiguez, Fernando Valenzuela, Manny Mota); KTLA (end of season simulcast)
- Radio: KLAC (Vin Scully, Charley Steiner, Rick Monday, Kevin Kennedy); KTNQ (Jaime Jarrín, Jorge Jarrin)

The 2016 Los Angeles Dodgers season was the 127th for the franchise in Major League Baseball, and their 59th season in Los Angeles, California. They began the season with a new manager in Dave Roberts. The Dodgers in 2016 set a new Major League record for the most players placed on the disabled list in one season. On September 25, they clinched their fourth consecutive National League West championship, the first team in the division ever to do so and defeated the Washington Nationals in five games in the NLDS. They were defeated by the Chicago Cubs; the eventual World Series champion, in six games in the NLCS. This was the 67th and final season for Hall of Fame broadcaster Vin Scully.

== Offseason ==
=== Managerial change ===
The Dodgers announced on October 22, 2015, that manager Don Mattingly would not be returning to the team for the 2016 season. In five seasons as manager, Mattingly had a record of 446–363, a .551 winning percentage (2nd best in Los Angeles Dodgers history) and guided the team to three straight National League West titles for the first time in franchise history. On November 23, the team announced that former Dodger player Dave Roberts would become the new manager.

The Dodgers also announced a new coaching staff, with pitching coach Rick Honeycutt and catching instructor Steve Yeager as the only holdovers from Mattingly's staff. New hires included bench coach Bob Geren, hitting coach Turner Ward, assistant hitting coach Tim Hyers, third base coach Chris Woodward, first base coach George Lombard, bullpen coach Josh Bard and quality assurance coach Juan Castro.

=== Broadcasting team ===
Hall of Fame broadcaster Vin Scully announced that the 2016 season would be his final season in the Dodgers broadcast booth. The season was his record 67th season with the Dodgers, the longest tenure with one team by any sports announcer in history. Scully was assigned only six road games during the season, which included the entirety of the team's season-ending series at San Francisco. The Dodgers held a tribute night for Scully at their September 23, 2016 home game, which featured a pre-game ceremony honoring his accomplishments.

As in previous seasons, most games not called by Scully were called by Charley Steiner on television, alongside returning analysts Orel Hershiser and Nomar Garciaparra. Steiner teamed with Rick Monday for most radio broadcasts; Kevin Kennedy would again work on radio with Monday when Steiner was on television. On television, 50 road games were also assigned to a new hire, Joe Davis, alongside Hershiser and Garciaparra. It was subsequently revealed over the off-season that Davis would succeed Vin Scully as the television voice of the Dodgers for the 2017 season.

=== Roster departures ===
On November 2, 2015, the day after the 2015 World Series, shortstop Jimmy Rollins, second baseman Howie Kendrick and starting pitcher Brett Anderson became free agents. The next day, starting pitcher Zack Greinke exercised an opt out option on his contract, voiding the last three years of his contract and becoming a free agent. Anderson accepted the Dodgers qualifying offer and remained with the team, though Greinke and Kendrick declined their offers. Outfielders Justin Ruggiano and Chris Heisey were outrighted to the minors and chose to become free agents in early November. The team also declined the 2016 options on second baseman Chase Utley, relief pitcher Joel Peralta, and starting pitcher Bronson Arroyo, making them all free agents. On December 2, the Dodgers chose not to tender 2016 contracts to pitchers Juan Nicasio and Lisalverto Bonilla, making them both free agents. The Dodgers traded pitcher Joe Wieland to the Seattle Mariners on January 12, 2016. The same day, they traded relief pitcher Tyler Olson and infielder Ronald Torreyes to the New York Yankees for a pair of minor leaguers.

=== Roster additions ===
The Dodgers started adding to their roster on December 7, when they claimed two players off waivers, pitcher Danny Reynolds from the Los Angeles Angels of Anaheim and outfielder Daniel Fields from the Milwaukee Brewers. Chase Utley re-signed with the Dodgers on December 9, for a one-year, $7 million, contract. Reynolds was designated for assignment on December 18 to make room for pitcher Tyler Olson who was acquired from the Seattle Mariners for cash considerations.

On December 16, 2015, the Dodgers acquired infielder Micah Johnson, pitcher Frankie Montas and outfielder Trayce Thompson in a three team trade that sent Todd Frazier to the Chicago White Sox and José Peraza, Brandon Dixon and Scott Schebler to the Cincinnati Reds. On December 30, they signed left-handed starter Scott Kazmir to a 3-year free agent contract. On January 6, they designated Olson for assignment and re-signed starting pitcher Brandon Beachy to a $1.5 million incentive laden one-year deal. On January 7, they signed right-handed starter Kenta Maeda, formerly of the Japanese Hiroshima Toyo Carp, to an eight-year contract. On January 19, they signed veteran right-handed pitcher Joe Blanton to a one-year, $4 million, contract as a relief pitcher. On February 4, they re-signed second baseman Howie Kendrick to a two-year, $20 million, contract. On February 19, the day spring training started, they signed right-handed relief pitcher Louis Coleman to a one-year, $725,000, free agent contract and two days later they finalized their signing of Cuban pitcher Yaisel Sierra to a six-year, $30 million, contract.

Off-season 40-man roster moves

Departing Player	Date	Transaction	New Team	Arriving player	Old team	Date	Transaction
Brett Anderson	November 2	Free agent	Los Angeles Dodgers	Brett Anderson	Los Angeles Dodgers	November 13	accepted qualifying offer
Zack Greinke	November 2	Free agent	Arizona Diamondbacks	Jharel Cotton	Oklahoma City Dodgers	November 20	added to 40-man roster
Jimmy Rollins	November 2	Free agent	Chicago White Sox	Ross Stripling	Tulsa Drillers	November 20	added to 40-man roster
Howie Kendrick	November 2	Free agent	Los Angeles Dodgers	Danny Reynolds	Los Angeles Angels of Anaheim	December 7	Waiver claim
Justin Ruggiano	November 6	outrighted and declared free agency	Texas Rangers	Daniel Fields	Milwaukee Brewers	December 7	Waiver claim
Chris Heisey	November 6	outrighted and declared free agency	Washington Nationals	Chase Utley	Los Angeles Dodgers	December 9	Free agent signing
Joel Peralta	November 6	option declined	Seattle Mariners	Micah Johnson	Chicago White Sox	December 16	Trade
Bronson Arroyo	November 6	option declined	Washington Nationals	Frankie Montas	Chicago White Sox	December 16	trade
Chase Utley	November 6	option declined	Los Angeles Dodgers	Trayce Thompson	Chicago White Sox	December 16	trade
Juan Nicasio	December 2	non tendered	Pittsburgh Pirates	Tyler Olson	Seattle Mariners	December 18	trade
Lisalverto Bonilla	December 2	non tendered	Los Angeles Dodgers	Scott Kazmir	Houston Astros	December 30	free agent signing
Brooks Brown	December 4	outrighted to the minors	Oklahoma City Dodgers	Brandon Beachy	Los Angeles Dodgers	January 6	free agent signing
José Peraza	December 16	trade	Cincinnati Reds	Kenta Maeda	Hiroshima Toyo Carp	January 7	free agent signing
Scott Schebler	December 16	trade	Cincinnati Reds	Joe Blanton	Pittsburgh Pirates	January 19	free agent signing
Brandon Dixon	December 16	trade	Cincinnati Reds	Howie Kendrick	Los Angeles Dodgers	February 4	free agent signing
Danny Reynolds	December 23	waiver claim	Houston Astros	Louis Coleman	Kansas City Royals	February 19	free agent signing
Daniel Fields	January 7	waiver claim	Chicago White Sox	Yaisel Sierra	Cuban National Series	February 21	free agent signing
Joe Wieland	January 12	trade	Seattle Mariners				
Tyler Olson	January 12	trade	New York Yankees				
Ronald Torreyes	January 12	trade	New York Yankees				
Brandon Beachy	January 27	outrighted to the minors	Oklahoma City Dodgers				

== Spring training ==
Early in spring training, the Dodgers received word that starting pitcher Brett Anderson would require surgery to repair a bulging disc in his lower back, sidelining him for the first 3–4 months of the season and that relief pitcher Josh Ravin broke his left arm in a traffic accident and was also out for a considerable amount of time. First baseman Adrián González took some time off from camp to play for Team Mexico in the World Baseball Classic qualifiers. The injury bug continued to ravage the Dodgers rotation, with Mike Bolsinger suffering a strained oblique and non roster pitcher Brandon Beachy came down with a case of elbow tendinitis that slowed his progress. On March 22, it was revealed that outfielder Andre Ethier had a broken leg, as a result of fouling a ball off his shin, and he would be out 10–14 weeks.

At the end of spring training, Ross Stripling, beat out Zach Lee and Carlos Frías for the fifth starter spot. The Dodgers opening day roster included 10 players on the disabled list, the most in MLB since the stat started being tracked in 2002.

== Standings ==
=== National League West ===
NL West
Team	W	L	Pct.	GB	Home	Road
Los Angeles Dodgers	91	71	.562	—	53‍–‍28	38‍–‍43
San Francisco Giants	87	75	.537	4	45‍–‍36	42‍–‍39
Colorado Rockies	75	87	.463	16	42‍–‍39	33‍–‍48
Arizona Diamondbacks	69	93	.426	22	33‍–‍48	36‍–‍45
San Diego Padres	68	94	.420	23	39‍–‍42	29‍–‍52

=== National League Wild Card ===
Wild Card standings

Division leaders
Team	W	L	Pct.
Chicago Cubs	103	58	.640
Washington Nationals	95	67	.586
Los Angeles Dodgers	91	71	.562

Wild Card teams (Top 2 teams qualify for postseason)
Team	W	L	Pct.	GB
New York Mets	87	75	.537	—
San Francisco Giants	87	75	.537	—
St. Louis Cardinals	86	76	.531	1
Miami Marlins	79	82	.491	7½
Pittsburgh Pirates	78	83	.484	8½
Colorado Rockies	75	87	.463	12
Milwaukee Brewers	73	89	.451	14
Philadelphia Phillies	71	91	.438	16
Arizona Diamondbacks	69	93	.426	18
Atlanta Braves	68	93	.422	18½
San Diego Padres	68	94	.420	19
Cincinnati Reds	68	94	.420	19

=== Record vs. opponents ===
NL Records

2016 National League record Source: MLB Standings Grid – 2016
Team	AZ	ATL	CHC	CIN	COL	LAD	MIA	MIL	NYM	PHI	PIT	SD	SF	STL	WSH	AL
Arizona	—	5–2	2–5	3–3	10–9	7–12	2–4	3–4	5–1	4–3	1–5	10–9	6–13	4–3	2–5	5–15
Atlanta	2–5	—	3–3	3–4	1–6	1–5	11–7	2–5	10–9	11–8	3–4	4–2	3–4	2–4	4–15	8–12
Chicago	5–2	3–3	—	15–4	2–4	4–3	4–3	11–8	2–5	5–1	14–4	4–2	4–3	10–9	5–2	15–5
Cincinnati	3–3	4–3	4–15	—	5–2	2–5	3–4	11–8	0–6	4–2	9–10	3–4	3–3	9–10	3–4	5–15
Colorado	9–10	6–1	4–2	2–5	—	7–12	2–5	1–5	6–1	2–5	2–5	10–9	9–10	2–4	4–2	9–11
Los Angeles	12–7	5–1	3–4	5–2	12–7	—	1–6	5–2	4–3	4–2	2–5	11–8	8–11	4–2	5–1	10–10
Miami	4–2	7–11	3–4	4–3	5–2	6–1	—	4–2	7–12	9–10	6–1	3–3	2–4	4–3	9–10	6–14
Milwaukee	4–3	5–2	8–11	8–11	5–1	2–5	2–4	—	2–5	3–4	9–10	3–4	1–5	6–13	4–2	11–9
New York	1–5	9–10	5–2	6–0	1–6	3–4	12–7	5–2	—	12–7	3–3	4–3	4–3	3–3	7–12	12–8
Philadelphia	3–4	8–11	1–5	2–4	5–2	2–4	10–9	4–3	7–12	—	3–4	5–2	3–3	2–5	5–14	11–9
Pittsburgh	5–1	4–3	4–14	10–9	5–2	5–2	1–6	10–9	3–3	4–3	—	3–3	4–3	9–10	2–4	9–11
San Diego	9–10	2–4	2–4	4–3	9–10	8–11	3–3	4–3	3–4	2–5	3–3	—	8–11	1–6	4–3	6–14
San Francisco	13–6	4–3	3–4	3–3	10–9	11–8	4–2	5–1	3–4	3–3	3–4	11–8	—	3–4	3–4	8–12
St. Louis	3–4	4–2	9–10	10–9	4–2	2–4	3–4	13–6	3–3	5–2	10–9	6–1	4–3	—	2–5	8–12
Washington	5–2	15–4	2–5	4–3	2–4	1–5	10–9	2–4	12–7	14–5	4–2	3–4	4–3	5–2	—	12–8

== Regular season ==
Opening Day starters
Name	Position
Chase Utley	Second baseman
Corey Seager	Shortstop
Justin Turner	Third baseman
Adrián González	First baseman
Yasiel Puig	Right fielder
Carl Crawford	Left fielder
Joc Pederson	Center fielder
A. J. Ellis	Catcher
Clayton Kershaw	Starting pitcher

=== April ===
The Dodgers began the 2016 season at Petco Park against the San Diego Padres on April 4. Clayton Kershaw made his sixth straight opening day start for the Dodgers and allowed only one hit in seven innings with nine strikeouts. The offense erupted as well, as the Dodgers started the season with a 15–0 rout. It was the best ever margin of victory in franchise history and also the first time they had won six straight opening day games. The 15 runs was one short of the franchise opening day record of 16 set against the Houston Astros in 1983. Scott Kazmir made his Dodgers debut the following night, pitching six scoreless innings while also allowing only one hit, as the Dodgers, with a 3–0 victory, got back-to-back-shutouts to open a season for the first time since 1974. The Dodgers finished the series out with a 7–0 win the next day, joining the 1963 Cardinals as the only MLB teams to open the season with three straight shutouts. Kenta Maeda made his major league debut with six scoreless innings and also hit a home run in his second at bat, the first Dodger pitcher to homer in his debut since Dan Bankhead in 1947. The Dodgers also set a new team record with 27 scoreless innings to start the season, surpassing the 23 innings mark set by the 1974 team. The Dodgers traveled to AT&T Park for the next series against the San Francisco Giants. Behind Alex Wood they fell one inning short of the Cardinals season opening shutout streak of 32 when the Giants scored three in the fifth. The Dodger bullpen then allowed a bunch of runs, including a grand slam by Hunter Pence to pull away and the Giants won 12–6. Ross Stripling made his major league debut in the second game of the series. He pitched a no-hitter for 7 1/3 innings but was taken out of the game with a two-run lead after walking a batter and reaching his 100th pitch. The relief pitcher, Chris Hatcher, gave up a two-run homer to the very next batter, Trevor Brown, to tie the game. Brandon Crawford hit a walk-off homer in the 10th as the Giants won 3–2. Kershaw pitched eight innings for the Dodgers in the following game, but allowed two solo homer and got a no-decision. The Dodgers came back to win the game on an RBI double by Charlie Culberson in the 10th inning, 3–2. In the final game of the road trip, the Dodgers scored five runs in the top of the first but saw the lead quickly disappear as Scott Kazmir allowed three homers and six total runs in only four innings. He was the first Dodgers pitcher to allow three homers to the Giants at San Francisco since Ismael Valdez in 1997. A two-run double by Joe Panik off reliever J. P. Howell in the sixth put the Giants up and they won 9–6.

In the Dodgers home opener on April 12 against the Arizona Diamondbacks, Maeda pitched six more scoreless innings. He joined Karl Spooner (1954) and Kazuhisa Ishii (2002) as the only Dodgers to begin their career with two consecutive scoreless starts. The bullpen continued to struggle however, and the team lost the game, 4–2. The Dodgers got seven innings from Wood in the next game and Kenley Jansen picked up a five out save as they won 3–1. The Dodgers scored five runs in the seventh inning the next day to win 5–2. Enrique Hernandez hit two home runs and the Dodgers, behind Kershaw, beat the Giants 7–3 on Jackie Robinson Day at Dodger Stadium. However, in the next game, Johnny Cueto allowed only one run in 7 1/3 innings and the Giants bullpen withstood a late Dodger rally to win 4–3. Kenta Maeda finally allowed a run in his next start, but only one as the Dodgers won the series with a 3–1 victory in the final game of the homestand. He became just the eighth Dodgers pitcher since 1913 to open his career with three straight quality starts.

The Dodgers went back on the road on April 19 to play a three-game series against the Atlanta Braves at Turner Field. Multi-hit games by Tyler Flowers and Jeff Francoeur led the Braves to an 8–1 rout in the opener. Justin Turner's RBI double in the 10th inning gave the Dodgers the 5–3 win the following day. Yasmani Grandal took his turn with a 10th inning RBI in the series finale as the team won 2–1. Kershaw struck out 10 in eight innings in the game. The team next traveled to Coors Field for a weekend series against the Colorado Rockies. A two-run triple by Brandon Barnes in the eighth inning gave the Rockies a 7–5 win on April 22. Kenta Maeda allowed only three hits and struck out eight in 6 1/3 innings the following game as the Dodgers won 4–1. He was the first pitcher in modern baseball history to allow only one run over his first four starts. In the series finale, the Dodgers jumped out to a quick 7–1 lead only for the Rockies to come back and take the lead in the late innings. Chase Utley's two-out double off Rockies closer Jake McGee in the ninth capped was part of five runs they scored that inning to win 12–10.

On April 25, the Dodgers returned home for a four-game series against former manager Don Mattingly and the Miami Marlins. Giancarlo Stanton hit a homer in the opener as the Marlins won 3–2. He hit a three-run homer in the next game, capping a five-run sixth inning off Kershaw in a 6–3 comeback win for the Marlins. Justin Nicolino pitched seven and one third shutout innings as the Marlins also won game three, 2–0. The Dodgers were swept by the Marlins in a four-game series for the first time ever as Stanton homered again and they won 5–3. A three-run homer by Matt Kemp in the eighth inning gave the Dodgers another loss, this time to the Padres, 5–1. The Dodgers ended the month of April on a six-game losing streak, thanks to another 5–2 loss to the Padres on April 30.

=== May ===
Clayton Kershaw pitched a complete-game, three-hit, 14-strikeout shutout on May 1 to bring the losing streak to an end. He also drove in the only run in the 1–0 victory over the Padres with a third-inning single.

The Dodgers began an interleague road trip on May 3 with a short two games series against the Tampa Bay Rays at Tropicana Field. Trayce Thompson had four RBI, including a two-run homer as the Dodgers won the opener 10–5. The Rays took the second game, 8–5, thanks to a three-run homer by Steve Pearce. Kevin Pillar hit his own three-run homer as the Dodgers next dropped the opener of a weekend series with the Toronto Blue Jays at Rogers Centre, 5–2. Kershaw struck out 10 batters without any walks in seven innings as the Dodgers won the next one, 6–2. They wrapped up the road trip with a 4–2 win on May 8.

Curtis Granderson homered off the first pitch by Scott Kazmir on May 9, as the New York Mets went on to beat the Dodgers 4–2 at Dodger Stadium. A pitchers' duel between Alex Wood and Jacob deGrom the following day went the Dodgers way, 3–2, thanks to a walk-off home run by Trayce Thompson. The Mets took the third game, 4–3, thanks to starting pitcher Noah Syndergaard. He pitched eight strong innings and also hit two home runs, driving in all the teams runs. Dodger starter Kenta Maeda became just the second Dodgers pitcher in history to allow multiple home runs in a game to pitchers, joining Doug McWeeny, who allowed homers to Erv Brame and Fred Fussell of the Pittsburgh Pirates on July 7, 1929 at Ebbets Field. The Dodgers won the next game, 5–0, behind another dominate Clayton Kershaw start. He struck out 13 while pitching a two-hit complete game shutout. He set an MLB record with five consecutive starts with at least 10 strikeouts and no more than one walk and a club record with five consecutive starts with at least 10 strikeouts. Yasiel Puig was 3-for-five with a homer and 2 RBI and Ross Stripling picked up his first major league win as the Dodgers beat the St. Louis Cardinals, 8–4 on May 13. Scott Kazmir pitched 8 2/3 innings and struck out seven as the Dodgers won 5–3 the following day. A pinch-hit RBI double by Yadier Molina helped the Cardinals beat up on the Dodgers bullpen and prevent the sweep, 5–2. Albert Pujols and Mike Trout combined for five RBI as the Los Angeles Angels of Anaheim beat the Dodgers 7–6 in the opener of the Freeway Series on May 16. Kershaw struck out 11 in eight innings the next game in a 5–1 win.

The series moved to Angel Stadium for the next game and Trout led the Angels in a five-run fifth inning that spoiled the spot start by Mike Bolsinger and gave them the victory in an 8–1 rout. Three more RBI and a homer by Trout the next day made it a 7–4 Angels victory in the final game of the series. Melvin Upton, Jr. hit a two-run walk-off homer off Dodgers closer Kenley Jansen as the San Diego Padres won 7–6 at Petco Park on May 20. The following day, Chin-hui Tsao walked in the winning run in the bottom of the 11th as the Dodgers lost again, 3–2. In the final game of the road trip, Yasiel Puig's two-run, bases loaded, single in the 17th inning led the Dodgers to a 9–5 win, snapping the losing streak. It was the longest game for the Dodgers since April 29, 2007, also against the Padres.

The Dodgers returned home for a three-game series against the Cincinnati Reds. Clayton Kershaw continued his strong start to the season, pitching a complete game two-hit shutout as the Dodgers won 1–0. Kershaw was the first Dodger pitcher with three shutouts in a month since Tim Belcher in 1989 and the first to last seven or more innings in his first 10 starts of the year since Fernando Valenzuela in 1981. The Dodgers, behind Bolsinger, handed the Reds their ninth straight loss, 8–2 on May 24. The Dodgers finished off the sweep of the Reds with a 3–1 win in the finale. Scott Kazmir struck out 12 in six innings, and combined with Reds starter Dan Straily, who struck out 11, they were the first regular season due to each strike out 11 or more batters at Dodger Stadium since Grant Jackson and Bill Singer on June 12, 1969.

The Dodgers promoted top prospect Julio Urías to make his major league debut as the starting pitcher against the New York Mets at Citi Field on May 27. At 19 years of age, he was the youngest starting pitcher to debut in the Majors since Félix Hernández in the 2005 season and the youngest Dodgers starting pitcher to debut since 18 year old Rex Barney in the 1943 season. He struggled in his debut, lasting only 2 2/3 innings while allowing three runs and walking four. The Dodgers rallies to tie the game in the top of the ninth on a three-run double by Chase Utley only to see the Mets win, 6–5, on a walk-off homer by Curtis Granderson. Utley homered twice in the next game, including a grand slam, as the Dodgers routed the Mets 9–1. In the final game of the series, Kershaw was again on his game, striking out 10 in 7 2/3 innings though he received a no-decision after the Mets tied the game with an RBI triple by Granderson off relief pitcher Adam Liberatore in the eighth. The Dodgers won the game, 4–2, thanks to a bases loaded single by Adrián González off Mets closer Jeurys Familia. The team traveled to Wrigley Field on Memorial Day to play the Chicago Cubs, the team with the best record in the league. In the opener of the four-game series, the Dodgers could only manage one hit and lost 2–0. In the next game, it was the Cubs who only managed one-hit. The Dodgers, thanks to a three-run homer by Corey Seager won 5–0. Kazmir struck out seven batters in six innings.

=== June ===
Jon Lester beat the Dodgers by pitching a complete game in the Cubs to a 2–1 victory to start the month of June. Julio Urías's second start of the season was a bit better than his first but he allowed three home runs, including back-to-back ones by Jason Heyward and Kris Bryant as the Cubs finished the series with a 7–2 win.

The Dodgers returned home to play the Atlanta Braves. Of the team's five hits in the game, four were home runs, including three from rookie Corey Seager as they won 4–2. Clayton Kershaw pitched six shutout innings the next game as the Dodgers won 4–0. He improved his personal record to 8–1 but the six innings was his shortest outing of the season. Seager hit two more home runs as the Dodgers doubled up the Braves, 12–6, to sweep the series. Trevor Story hit a three-run home run and the Colorado Rockies pounded Mike Bolsinger and the Dodgers 6–1 in the start of the next three-game series. Trayce Thompson hit a walk-off homer with two outs in the bottom of the ninth as the Dodgers evened the series with a 4–3 win. The Rockies took the following game, 1–0, thanks to an RBI single by Daniel Descalso off Kenta Maeda in the seventh inning.

They next traveled to AT&T Park for a series against the first place San Francisco Giants. In the opener, Kershaw had another strong game, allowing two runs and five hits in eight innings with 13 strikeouts. A solo homer by Justin Turner in the top of the ninth gave the Dodgers a 3–2 win. Buster Posey hit a walk-off RBI single off of Dodgers closer Kenley Jansen the next day as the Giants won 5–4 in 10 innings. Urías struck out seven in the next game, and only allowed two runs, but those were on a two-run homer by Brandon Belt in the 6th and that was all the Giants needed for a 2–1 victory. The Dodgers traveled to Chase Field for a road series against the Arizona Diamondbacks beginning on June 13. Former Dodger Zack Greinke struck out six over seven innings to beat his old team, 3–2. The Dodgers had two homers from Joc Pederson and solo shots by Justin Turner and Chase Utley as they evened the series with a 7–4 win the next game. A three-run homer by Scott Van Slyke accounted for all the Dodgers runs as the finished off the series with a 3–2 win. Kershaw struck out 11 in 7 1/3 innings to pick up his 10th win of the season.

Jonathan Villar hit a two-run homer off Pedro Báez in the ninth inning to give the Milwaukee Brewers an 8–6 win over the Dodgers on June 16 at Dodger Stadium. Urías struck out eight in five innings in his next start the following day, and Justin Turner hit two home runs, including a walk-off shot in the 10th inning as the Dodgers won 3–2. Mike Bolsinger had a poor start in the next game, allowing five runs and nine hits in only 2 2/3 innings but Turner hit a three-run home run as the Dodgers scored six in the third and won the game 10–6. In the final game of the series, Kenta Maeda and Matt Garza engaged in a pitchers' duel for six innings and the Dodgers won the game, 2–1, on a bases loaded walk by Tyler Thornburg in the bottom of the ninth. Kershaw held the Washington Nationals to one run in seven innings, while striking out eight, and Kenley Jansen picked up his 162nd career save, breaking the franchise record previously held by Éric Gagné, in the 4–1 win on June 20. Yasmani Grandal hit a three-run home run in the eighth inning as the Dodgers came from behind for a 3–2 win the next day. The Dodgers proceeded to sweep the Nations in the three-game series as Yasiel Puig singled and scored on a three base error by outfielder Michael Taylor in the bottom of the ninth for a walk-off, come from behind, 4–3 win.

The Dodgers traveled to Pittsburgh on June 24 to open a four-game series against the Pirates at PNC Park. Nick Tepesch was promoted from AAA to make a spot start and he allowed five runs on seven hits in only four innings to put the team in a hole they never recovered from. Corey Seager had four hits in the game but the Dodgers lost 8–6. Kershaw allowed four runs in a game for the first time all season as his 10 start unbeaten streak came to an end with a 4–3 loss to the Pirates on June 26. In the final game of the series, the Pirates jumped out to a four-run lead in the first inning but the Dodgers came from behind to win 5–4 to avoid the sweep. Urías picked up his first major league win on June 28 with a 6–5 victory over the Brewers at Miller Park. Junior Guerra shut down the Dodgers bats the next say as rookie Brock Stewart had a rough debut, allowing five runs in the second inning as the Dodgers lost 7–0. The Dodgers received some bad news as the month ended, with Kershaw heading to the disabled list due to a herniated disc in his back. Meanwhile, the team won the final game of the month, 8–1. Maeda allowed only one run on three hits in six innings and the Dodgers hit three home runs.

=== July ===
The Dodgers acquired Bud Norris from the Atlanta Braves and he was the starting pitcher on July 1 against the Colorado Rockies at Dodger Stadium. He struck out eight in six scoreless innings of the Dodgers 5–0 victory. Scott Kazmir started the next game, striking out 10 in six innings as the Dodgers won 6–1. The Dodgers finished off the sweep of the Rockies with a 4–1 victory. Brandon McCarthy returned to the mound for the first time since undergoing Tommy John surgery in April 2015 and allowed only two hits in five scoreless innings with eight strikeouts. A seventh-inning triple by Corey Seager led the Dodgers come from behind 7–5 victory over the Baltimore Orioles on Independence Day. A three-run homer by Manny Machado keyed the Orioles 4–1 win the next day. The two teams combined for a Dodger stadium record 36 strikeouts on July 6 and Chase Utley had a career high six hits in the game (the first Dodger to do so since Shawn Green in 2002). A two-run double by Jonathan Schoop in the 14th inning gave the Orioles a 6–4 win. Hyun-jin Ryu made his first start since 2014 on July 7 against the San Diego Padres and allowed six runs in 4 2/3 innings. Yasmani Grandal hit three home runs on July 8 as the Dodgers won 10–6 over the Padres. He was the third catcher in history with five hits in a three-homer game (Victor Martinez in 2004 and Walker Cooper in 1949) and the third Dodger catcher to ever have three homers in a game (Mike Piazza in 1996 and Roy Campanella in 1950). McCarthy picked up his second win and the Dodgers bullpen pitched four scoreless innings in a 4–3 win the next game. Adam Liberatore set the Dodgers franchise record with his 24th consecutive scoreless appearance. Kenta Maeda struck out a season-high 13 batters in seven innings while Adrián González homered, and the Dodgers ended the first half of the season with a 3–1 win over the Padres on July 10.

Corey Seager and Kenley Jansen both participated in the All-Star Game on July 12 and Seager also took part in the Home Run Derby. After the break, the team took on the Arizona Diamondbacks at Chase Field. Chris Taylor had six RBI and hit a grand slam for his first career homer in the Dodgers 13–7 win. Jansen blew a save the next day and the Dodgers lost 2–1 in 12 innings. Jake Lamb homered as the Diamondbacks won the series 6–5. Chase Utley hit a leadoff homer and drove in 3 runs as the Dodgers beat the Washington Nationals 8–4 at Nationals Park on July 19. The next day, Bryce Harper hit his 20th homer of the season and the Nationals pounded the Dodgers 8–1. Justin Turner hit two home runs as the Dodgers handed Stephen Strasburg his first loss of the season (after 13 wins), 6–3. After a blown save by Jansen, the St. Louis Cardinals beat the Dodgers on a walk-off homer by Matt Adams in the 16th inning, 4–3 at Busch Stadium. The Dodgers picked up to win the next game, 7–2. They finished off the road trip with a 9–6 victory highlighted by a grand slam by Adrián González in the 1st inning.

Bud Norris allowed only two runs in seven innings, out dueling Tampa Bay Rays starter Chris Archer in a 3–2 win at Dodger Stadium on July 26. A two-run homer by Evan Longoria was the key blow as the Rays, behind Matt Moore won the next game, 3–1. The Dodgers got into a wild game with the Diamondbacks on July 29, giving up seven runs in the top of the seventh inning and then answering back with five in the bottom of the inning, led by two-run homers by Joc Pederson and Chase Utley. They wound up winning 9–7. The offense did not show up the next day and the Diamondbacks won 4–2. Despite losing starter Bud Norris to an injury two batters into the next game, the Dodgers, thanks to homers by Grandal, Seager and Pederson, beat the Diamondbacks 14–3 to end the month of July.

=== August ===
The Dodgers began August by making a flurry of trades which sent a number of minor leaguers for outfielder Josh Reddick, starting pitcher Rich Hill and relievers Jesse Chavez and Josh Fields. These moves led to the surprise demotion of outfielder Yasiel Puig to the minors. However, the new look team had trouble in the next series at Coors Field. In the opener, Carlos González was 3-for-5 with two doubles and four RBI as the Colorado Rockies beat the Dodgers 7–3. Rookie Brock Stewart made his second spot start in the next game and was pounded, allowing four home runs and nine runs overall, in a 12–2 loss. They avoided the road sweep thanks to Kenta Maeda pitching 5 2/3 solid innings for his 10th win, the 13th Dodger rookie pitcher with double digit wins. Corey Seager tied Hanley Ramírez for the Los Angeles Dodgers single-season record for home runs by a shortstop with his 19th in the 4–2 win.

Back home for a rare series against the Boston Red Sox, the Dodgers were shut out by knuckleball pitcher Steven Wright and lost 9–0. Ross Stripling pitched five scoreless innings the next day in the Dodgers 3–0 win. Seager hit his 31st double of the season, passing Eric Karros for the Dodgers rookie record. In the next game, rookie Rob Segedin had four RBI in his MLB debut to set a franchise record and Adrián González hit his 300th career homer as the Dodgers took the series with an 8–5 win. Seager hit two more home runs on August 8, passing Ramírez and putting him one behind the franchise record. Julio Urías allowed three runs in five innings as the Dodgers won 9–4 over the Philadelphia Phillies. They won again the next day, 9–3, but Freddy Galvis hit a three-run homer in the series finale as the Phillies won 6–2. The Pittsburgh Pirates beat the Dodgers 5–1 on August 12, thanks to first inning homers by Andrew McCutchen and Jordy Mercer. In the next game, seven Dodgers pitchers combined for 11 walks, the highest total by the Dodgers in a nine inning game since May 25, 2009 but Joc Pederson was 3 for 5 with a double and a homer to lead the team to an 8–4 win. Brett Anderson rejoined the Dodgers rotation on August 14, for the first time since suffering a back injury in spring training. He didn't last long, allowing two home runs and five runs in the first inning before being replaced. The Dodgers never caught up and lost 11–3 to the Pirates.

The Dodgers went on the road to Citizens Bank Park where Chase Utley had a good game against his former team, the Philadelphia Phillies. He hit two home runs, including a grand slam, in the Dodgers 15–5 rout. González hit two homers in the next game as the Dodgers won, 7–2. Justin Turner hit a three-run homer in the next game but the Phillies came from behind, thanks to homers by Maikel Franco and Ryan Howard to win 5–4 and avoid the sweep. Bud Norris returned from the disabled list to start the opener of a series against the Cincinnati Reds but lasted only 3 2/3 innings. Joey Votto hit a three-run homer and relief pitcher Michael Lorenzen hit a two-run homer as the Reds won 9–2. Brett Anderson made his second start of the season on August 20 and again was shelled, allowing six runs in three innings before leaving because of a blister. Brandon Finnegan allowed only one hit in seven innings and the Reds routed the Dodgers 11–1. Julio Urías turned in his best start as a Dodger to that point in the next game, with six shutout innings, and the Dodgers won 4–0. The Dodgers won a slugfest with the Reds on August 22, 18–9. They hit seven home runs in the game, including three by Adrián González. It was the first time the visiting team at Great American Ballpark had hit seven in one game.

The Dodgers returned home on August 23 for a key divisional series against the San Francisco Giants. Corey Seager had three hits in four at bats and Andrew Toles and Rob Segedin homered as the Dodgers roughed up Madison Bumgarner in a 9–5 win. The following day, Rich Hill made his Dodgers debut, three weeks after he was acquired in a trade, and pitched six shutout innings while Justin Turner's solo homer accounted for all the scoring in a 1–0 win. Kenley Jansen tied Jim Brewer's franchise record for strikeouts by a reliever with the 604th of his career. On August 25, Matt Moore came within one out of a no hitter when Corey Seager singled, but he still beat the Dodgers 4–0. Kris Bryant hit two home runs the next day as the Chicago Cubs beat the Dodgers, 6–4, in 10 innings. Seager hit his 23rd home run of the season in the following game, setting the Dodgers single-season record for home runs by a shortstop. Julio Urías recovered from a rough first inning to pitch six solid frames as the Dodgers won 3–2. An error by the Cubs in the eighth inning led to the only run of the next game as the Dodgers won 1–0.

The Dodgers next traveled back to Coors Field to wrap up the month of August with a three-game series against the Rockies. The Dodgers bullpen imploded and they lost the opener 8–1. A rain out on August 30 forced the Dodgers and Rockies to play a day-night doubleheader the following day. In the opener, the Dodgers offense continued to struggle and they were routed again, 7–0. This was the first time the Rockies had shut out the Dodgers at home since August 27, 2012. In the second game, the Rockies scored five runs off of a shaky Bud Norris in the first inning but came back and won the game on a grand slam homer by Andrew Toles in the eighth inning, 10–8.

=== September ===
The Dodger had 13 hits on September 2 against the San Diego Padres, including four by Howie Kendrick, but left 11 men on base and lost 4–2 with Yangervis Solarte's eighth inning homer the key blow. Rich Hill allowed only one hit in six innings the next game and Josh Reddick hit his first homer as a Dodger in a 5–1 win. José De León struck out nine in six innings in his major league debut and Yasiel Puig and Yasmani Grandal homered as the Dodgers won the series finale 7–4. The Dodgers hit five homers off former teammate Zack Greinke of the Arizona Diamondbacks in a 10–2 victory on Labor Day. They won again the next day, 5–2, behind a solid start by Ross Stripling, whose 66 pitched in five innings was the fewest by a winning Dodgers starter since Greg Maddux threw 47 pitches in six innings on September 27, 2008. Puig homered again and Brock Stewart pitched five innings of one run ball as the Dodgers swept the Diamondbacks with a 3–1 win.

Clayton Kershaw rejoined the Dodgers rotation on September 9 for the first time in two months, but only lasted three innings while allowing two runs. José Fernández struck out 14 in seven innings as the Miami Marlins beat the Dodgers 4–1 at Marlins Park. Hill was perfect through seven innings in the next game, but manager Dave Roberts made the decision to pull him from the game and bring in reliever Joe Blanton. Blanton allowed a hit to Jeff Francoeur with two outs in the eighth. Joc Pederson hit two home runs and the Dodgers won 5–0. José Ureña held the Dodgers to only four hits in 8 2/3 innings in the series finale as the Marlins won 3–0. The Dodgers next traveled to play the New York Yankees at Yankee Stadium. De León allowed two runs on three hits in five innings while Puig and Justin Turner homered in the 8–2 win. Jacoby Ellsbury and Didi Gregorius hit back to back home runs in the seventh inning to break open a scoreless game and the Yankees won 3–0. Kershaw allowed only one hit in five scoreless innings and the Dodgers scored two runs in the top of the ninth to win 2–0 over the Yankees on September 14. Hill finally allowed his first runs as a Dodger in the next game, as the Diamondbacks' Kyle Jensen took him deep in the second inning. A three-run homer by Mitch Haniger off reliever Louis Coleman put the game out of reach and the Dodgers lost 7–3 at Chase Field. Kenta Maeda out dueled Greinke the next game and the Dodgers won 3–2. Joc Pederson homered and the Dodgers won 6–2 the following day. Corey Seager set a new Los Angeles Dodgers record for hits by a rookie with 181. In the final game of the roadtrip, the Dodgers fell behind 7–1 after five innings but came back to tie the game with a six-run sixth inning before ultimately losing 10–9 in 12 innings.

The Dodgers returned home for their final homestand of the regular season. Kershaw and the San Francisco Giants' Madison Bumgarner engaged in a pitching duel in the opener, with the Dodgers winning 2–1 on a walk-off double by Adrián González in the ninth. In the following game, Johnny Cueto and three relievers shut down the Dodgers and Brandon Belt and Eduardo Núñez each hit solo homers in the 2–0 Giants win. A three-run homer by Puig in the first inning of the third game of the series led to a 9–3 rout by the Dodgers and a commanding six game lead in the division race. Yasmani Grandal welcomed the Colorado Rockies to town by going four for four with two homers, including a grand slam in a 7–4 win. Back-to-back homers by Joc Pederson and Andre Ethier led the Dodgers to a 5–2 win the next night. Kershaw struck out six batters in seven scoreless innings and Josh Reddick hit a grand slam as the Dodgers rolled to a 14–1 rout over the Rockies on September 24. The team clinched its fourth consecutive division title the following day, winning 4–3 on a walk-off home run by Charlie Culberson. The Dodgers became the first National League West team to achieve that feat.

The Dodgers began their final road trip of the season against the San Diego Padres at Petco Park. Hunter Renfroe homered twice, including a grand slam, and drove in all seven runs in the Padres 7–1 victory. Renfroe hit a two-run homer the next day and the Padres won again, this time 6–5. The Dodgers offense, led by Joc Pederson's three RBI, beat the Padres 9–4 in the final game of the series, to avoid a sweep. The Dodgers traveled to AT&T Park to finish the regular season against the Giants, who scored seven runs in the sixth inning to take the opener, 9–3. The Giants also won the next game, 3–0, ensuring that the Dodgers would begin the postseason on the road. The Dodgers finished their regular season on October 2, with a 7–1 loss and a sweep at the hands of the Giants. That would be the final broadcast in the career of longtime Dodger announcer Vin Scully.

=== Game log ===
2016 Game Log (91–71)
April (12–13)

#	Date	Opponent	Score	Win	Loss	Save	Attendance	Record
1	April 4	@ Padres	**W** 15–0	**Kershaw** (1–0)	Ross (0–1)	—	44,317	1–0
2	April 5	@ Padres	**W** 3–0	**Kazmir** (1–0)	Shields (0–1)	**Jansen** (1)	28,329	2–0
3	April 6	@ Padres	**W** 7–0	**Maeda** (1–0)	Cashner (0–1)	—	30,054	3–0
4	April 7	@ Giants	L 6–12	Heston (1–0)	**Wood** (0–1)	—	41,940	3–1
5	April 8	@ Giants	L 2–3 (10)	Casilla (1–0)	**Blanton** (0–1)	—	41,742	3–2
6	April 9	@ Giants	**W** 3–2 (10)	**Hatcher** (1–0)	Kontos (0–1)	**Jansen** (2)	41,224	4–2
7	April 10	@ Giants	L 6–9	Cueto (2–0)	**Coleman** (0–1)	Casilla (2)	41,656	4–3
8	April 12	Diamondbacks	L 2–4	Clippard (2–0)	**Hatcher** (1–1)	Ziegler (1)	53,279	4–4
9	April 13	Diamondbacks	**W** 3–1	**Wood** (1–1)	De La Rosa (0–2)	**Jansen** (3)	44,244	5–4
10	April 14	Diamondbacks	**W** 5–2	**Howell** (1–0)	Delgado (0–1)	**Jansen** (4)	40,879	6–4
11	April 15	Giants	**W** 7–3	**Kershaw** (2–0)	Bumgarner (1–1)	—	53,449	7–4
12	April 16	Giants	L 3–4	Cueto (3–0)	**Kazmir** (1–1)	Casilla (3)	53,409	7–5
13	April 17	Giants	**W** 3–1	**Maeda** (2–0)	Samardzija (1–1)	**Jansen** (5)	48,911	8–5
14	April 19	@ Braves	L 1–8	Weber (1–0)	**Wood** (1–2)	—	14,160	8–6
15	April 20	@ Braves	**W** 5–3 (10)	**Blanton** (1–1)	Grilli (1–1)	**Jansen** (6)	16,087	9–6
16	April 21	@ Braves	**W** 2–1 (10)	**Hatcher** (2–1)	Ogando (1–1)	**Jansen** (7)	18,431	10–6
17	April 22	@ Rockies	L 5–7	Qualls (1–0)	**Hatcher** (2–2)	McGee (4)	37,153	10–7
18	April 23	@ Rockies	**W** 4–1	**Maeda** (3–0)	Chatwood (2–2)	**Jansen** (8)	42,179	11–7
19	April 24	@ Rockies	**W** 12–10	**Blanton** (2–1)	McGee (0–1)	**Jansen** (9)	35,962	12–7
20	April 25	Marlins	L 2–3	Chen (1–1)	**Stripling** (0–1)	Ramos (4)	44,954	12–8
21	April 26	Marlins	L 3–6	Koehler (2–2)	**Kershaw** (2–1)	Ramos (5)	41,102	12–9
22	April 27	Marlins	L 0–2	Nicolino (1–0)	**Kazmir** (1–2)	Ureña (1)	38,909	12–10
23	April 28	Marlins	L 3–5	Fernández (2–2)	**Maeda** (3–1)	Ramos (6)	44,009	12–11
24	April 29	Padres	L 1–5	Buchter (1–0)	**Hatcher** (2–3)	—	49,686	12–12
25	April 30	Padres	L 2–5	Rea (2–1)	**Stripling** (0–2)	Rodney (4)	45,740	12–13

May (16–12)

#	Date	Opponent	Score	Win	Loss	Save	Attendance	Record
26	May 1	Padres	**W** 1–0	**Kershaw** (3–1)	Pomeranz (2–3)	—	49,271	13–13
27	May 3	@ Rays	**W** 10–5	**Kazmir** (2–2)	Moore (1–3)	**Jansen** (10)	14,116	14–13
28	May 4	@ Rays	L 5–8	Ramírez (5–1)	**Wood** (1–3)	Colomé (6)	13,226	14–14
29	May 6	@ Blue Jays	L 2–5	Floyd (1–2)	**Blanton** (2–2)	Storen (2)	42,304	14–15
30	May 7	@ Blue Jays	**W** 6–2	**Kershaw** (4–1)	Dickey (1–4)	—	47,156	15–15
31	May 8	@ Blue Jays	**W** 4–2	**Hatcher** (3–3)	Storen (0–2)	**Jansen** (11)	46,665	16–15
32	May 9	Mets	L 2–4	Matz (5–1)	**Kazmir** (2–3)	Familia (11)	42,186	16–16
33	May 10	Mets	**W** 3–2	**Jansen** (1–0)	Robles (0–2)	—	38,858	17–16
34	May 11	Mets	L 3–4	Syndergaard (3–2)	**Maeda** (3–2)	Familia (12)	40,970	17–17
35	May 12	Mets	**W** 5–0	**Kershaw** (5–1)	Colón (3–2)	—	41,765	18–17
36	May 13	Cardinals	**W** 8–4	**Stripling** (1–2)	Wacha (2–4)	**Jansen** (12)	46,716	19–17
37	May 14	Cardinals	**W** 5–3	**Kazmir** (3–3)	Martínez (4–3)	**Jansen** (13)	48,459	20–17
38	May 15	Cardinals	L 2–5	Leake (2–3)	**Howell** (1–1)	Rosenthal (7)	51,350	20–18
39	May 16	Angels	L 6–7	Shoemaker (2–5)	**Maeda** (3–3)	Salas (2)	39,583	20–19
40	May 17	Angels	**W** 5–1	**Kershaw** (6–1)	Weaver (3–3)	—	42,514	21–19
41	May 18	@ Angels	L 1–8	Tropeano (2–2)	**Bolsinger** (0–1)	—	44,006	21–20
42	May 19	@ Angels	L 4–7	Álvarez (1–1)	**Stripling** (1–3)	Smith (5)	45,007	21–21
43	May 20	@ Padres	L 6–7	Quackenbush (2–2)	**Jansen** (1–1)	—	31,836	21–22
44	May 21	@ Padres	L 2–3 (11)	Hand (1–0)	**Tsao** (0–1)	—	40,221	21–23
45	May 22	@ Padres	**W** 9–5 (17)	**Stripling** (2–3)	Perdomo (1–1)	—	43,100	22–23
46	May 23	Reds	**W** 1–0	**Kershaw** (7–1)	Finnegan (1–3)	—	42,519	23–23
47	May 24	Reds	**W** 8–2	**Bolsinger** (1–1)	Wright (0–1)	—	42,278	24–23
48	May 25	Reds	**W** 3–1	**Kazmir** (4–3)	Straily (2–2)	**Jansen** (14)	44,855	25–23
49	May 27	@ Mets	L 5–6	Familia (2–0)	**Báez** (0–1)	—	43,462	25–24
50	May 28	@ Mets	**W** 9–1	**Maeda** (4–3)	Verrett (3–2)	—	42,227	26–24
51	May 29	@ Mets	**W** 4–2	**Liberatore** (1–0)	Familia (2–1)	**Jansen** (15)	42,287	27–24
52	May 30	@ Cubs	L 0–2	T. Wood (3–0)	**A. Wood** (1–4)	Rondón (9)	41,470	27–25
53	May 31	@ Cubs	**W** 5–0	**Blanton** (3–2)	Richard (0–1)	—	34,681	28–25

June (16–12)

#	Date	Opponent	Score	Win	Loss	Save	Attendance	Record
54	June 1	@ Cubs	L 1–2	Lester (6–3)	**Bolsinger** (1–2)	—	36,426	28–26
55	June 2	@ Cubs	L 2–7	Hendricks (4–4)	**Urías** (0–1)	—	37,422	28–27
56	June 3	Braves	**W** 4–2	**Maeda** (5–3)	Teherán (1–6)	**Jansen** (16)	46,366	29–27
57	June 4	Braves	**W** 4–0	**Kershaw** (8–1)	Norris (1–7)	—	47,126	30–27
58	June 5	Braves	**W** 12–6	**Kazmir** (5–3)	Wisler (2–6)	—	47,950	31–27
59	June 6	Rockies	L 1–6	Chatwood (7–4)	**Bolsinger** (1–3)	—	38,964	31–28
60	June 7	Rockies	**W** 4–3	**Jansen** (2–1)	Estévez (1–3)	—	40,525	32–28
61	June 8	Rockies	L 0–1	Rusin (2–4)	**Maeda** (5–4)	McGee (15)	41,324	32–29
62	June 10	@ Giants	**W** 3–2	**Kershaw** (9–1)	Casilla (1–2)	**Jansen** (17)	41,208	33–29
63	June 11	@ Giants	L 4–5 (10)	Stratton (1–0)	**Jansen** (2–2)	—	41,358	33–30
64	June 12	@ Giants	L 1–2	Peavy (3–6)	**Urías** (0–2)	Casilla (13)	41,583	33–31
65	June 13	@ Diamondbacks	L 2–3	Greinke (9–3)	**Bolsinger** (1–4)	Ziegler (13)	21,374	33–32
66	June 14	@ Diamondbacks	**W** 7–4	**Maeda** (6–4)	Bradley (2–3)	**Jansen** (18)	23,458	34–32
67	June 15	@ Diamondbacks	**W** 3–2	**Kershaw** (10–1)	Corbin (3–6)	**Jansen** (19)	27,792	35–32
68	June 16	Brewers	L 6–8	Thornburg (3–1)	**Báez** (0–2)	Jeffress (19)	44,183	35–33
69	June 17	Brewers	**W** 3–2 (10)	**Báez** (1–2)	Jeffress (1–2)	—	44,998	36–33
70	June 18	Brewers	**W** 10–6	**Hatcher** (4–3)	Anderson (4–7)	—	44,112	37–33
71	June 19	Brewers	**W** 2–1	**Jansen** (3–2)	Thornburg (3–2)	—	45,931	38–33
72	June 20	Nationals	**W** 4–1	**Kershaw** (11–1)	Petit (2–1)	**Jansen** (20)	44,712	39–33
73	June 21	Nationals	**W** 3–2	**Coleman** (1–1)	Roark (6–5)	**Jansen** (21)	42,307	40–33
74	June 22	Nationals	**W** 4–3	**Hatcher** (5–3)	Kelley (1–1)	—	43,776	41–33
75	June 24	@ Pirates	L 6–8	Feliz (2–0)	**Tepesch** (0–1)	Melancon (21)	28,226	41–34
76	June 25	@ Pirates	L 1–6	Locke (7–5)	**Maeda** (6–5)	—	33,590	41–35
77	June 26	@ Pirates	L 3–4	Kuhl (1–0)	**Kershaw** (11–2)	Melancon (22)	32,228	41–36
78	June 27	@ Pirates	**W** 5–4	**Kazmir** (6–3)	Liriano (4–8)	**Jansen** (22)	26,925	42–36
79	June 28	@ Brewers	**W** 6–5	**Urías** (1–2)	Anderson (4–8)	**Jansen** (23)	33,819	43–36
80	June 29	@ Brewers	L 0–7	Guerra (5–1)	**Stewart** (0–1)	—	26,566	43–37
81	June 30	@ Brewers	**W** 8–1	**Maeda** (7–5)	Davies (5–4)	—	33,029	44–37

July (15–9)

#	Date	Opponent	Score	Win	Loss	Save	Attendance	Record
82	July 1	Rockies	**W** 5–0	**Norris** (4–7)	de la Rosa (5–5)	—	43,644	45–37
83	July 2	Rockies	**W** 6–1	**Kazmir** (7–3)	Bettis (6–6)	—	46,608	46–37
84	July 3	Rockies	**W** 4–1	**McCarthy** (1–0)	Gray (5–4)	**Jansen** (24)	41,836	47–37
85	July 4	Orioles	**W** 7–5	**Blanton** (4–2)	Despaigne (0–1)	**Jansen** (25)	47,378	48–37
86	July 5	Orioles	L 1–4	Tillman (11–2)	**Maeda** (7–6)	Britton (24)	45,373	48–38
87	July 6	Orioles	L 4–6 (14)	Givens (6–1)	**Hatcher** (5–4)	Britton (25)	40,899	48–39
88	July 7	Padres	L 0–6	Pomeranz (8–7)	**Ryu** (0–1)	—	44,759	48–40
89	July 8	Padres	**W** 10–6	**Báez** (2–2)	Cashner (3–7)	—	43,588	49–40
90	July 9	Padres	**W** 4–3	**McCarthy** (2–0)	Perdomo (3–4)	**Jansen** (26)	48,411	50–40
91	July 10	Padres	**W** 3–1	**Maeda** (8–6)	Friedrich (4–5)	**Jansen** (27)	42,801	51–40
**87th All-Star Game in San Diego, California**
92	July 15	@ Diamondbacks	**W** 13–7	**Norris** (5–7)	Corbin (4–8)	—	30,639	52–40
93	July 16	@ Diamondbacks	L 1–2 (12)	Delgado (2–1)	**Fien** (0–1)	—	38,899	52–41
94	July 17	@ Diamondbacks	L 5–6	Ray (5–8)	**Maeda** (8–7)	Barrett (2)	29,459	52–42
95	July 19	@ Nationals	**W** 8–4	**Kazmir** (8–3)	López (0–1)	—	38,747	53–42
96	July 20	@ Nationals	L 1–8	González (6–8)	**Norris** (5–8)	—	34,050	53–43
97	July 21	@ Nationals	**W** 6–3	**Liberatore** (2–0)	Strasburg (13–1)	**Jansen** (28)	38,586	54–43
98	July 22	@ Cardinals	L 3–4 (16)	Maness (1–2)	**Norris** (5–9)	—	41,915	54–44
99	July 23	@ Cardinals	**W** 7–2	**Maeda** (9–7)	Leake (7–8)	—	45,477	55–44
100	July 24	@ Cardinals	**W** 9–6	**Kazmir** (9–3)	Mayers (0–1)	**Jansen** (29)	41,423	56–44
101	July 26	Rays	**W** 3–2	**Norris** (6–9)	Archer (5–14)	**Jansen** (30)	46,960	57–44
102	July 27	Rays	L 1–3	Moore (7–7)	**McCarthy** (2–1)	Colomé (22)	43,576	57–45
103	July 29	Diamondbacks	**W** 9–7	**Báez** (3–2)	Curtis (0–1)	**Jansen** (31)	50,966	58–45
104	July 30	Diamondbacks	L 2–4	Shipley (1–1)	**Kazmir** (9–4)	Barrett (3)	49,540	58–46
105	July 31	Diamondbacks	**W** 14–3	**Coleman** (2–1)	Corbin (4–10)	—	42,380	59–46

August (15–13)

#	Date	Opponent	Score	Win	Loss	Save	Attendance	Record
106	August 2	@ Rockies	L 3–7	Gray (8–4)	**McCarthy** (2–2)	—	32,607	59–47
107	August 3	@ Rockies	L 2–12	Anderson (4–3)	**Stewart** (0–2)	—	28,682	59–48
108	August 4	@ Rockies	**W** 4–2	**Maeda** (10–7)	Chatwood (10–7)	**Jansen** (32)	31,117	60–48
109	August 5	Red Sox	L 0–9	Wright (13–5)	**Kazmir** (9–5)	—	52,728	60–49
110	August 6	Red Sox	**W** 3–0	**Stripling** (3–3)	Rodríguez (2–5)	**Jansen** (33)	47,696	61–49
111	August 7	Red Sox	**W** 8–5	**Fields** (1–0)	Price (9–8)	**Jansen** (34)	50,640	62–49
112	August 8	Phillies	**W** 9–4	**Urías** (2–2)	Eflin (3–5)	—	48,370	63–49
113	August 9	Phillies	**W** 9–3	**Maeda** (11–7)	Velasquez (8–4)	—	42,859	64–49
114	August 10	Phillies	L 2–6	Araújo (2–1)	**Kazmir** (9–6)	—	41,098	64–50
115	August 12	Pirates	L 1–5	Nova (2–0)	**Stripling** (3–4)	Watson (5)	47,438	64–51
116	August 13	Pirates	**W** 8–4	**Urías** (3–2)	Cole (7–8)	**Jansen** (35)	40,563	65–51
117	August 14	Pirates	L 3–11	Kuhl (3–0)	**Anderson** (0–1)	—	43,468	65–52
118	August 16	@ Phillies	**W** 15–5	**Maeda** (12–7)	Velasquez (8–5)	—	28,118	66–52
119	August 17	@ Phillies	**W** 7–2	**Kazmir** (10–6)	Thompson (1–2)	—	21,137	67–52
120	August 18	@ Phillies	L 4–5	Mariot (1–0)	**Dayton** (0–1)	Gómez (32)	29,187	67–53
121	August 19	@ Reds	L 2–9	Adleman (2–1)	**Norris** (6–10)	—	28,184	67–54
122	August 20	@ Reds	L 1–11	Finnegan (8–9)	**Anderson** (0–2)	—	29,735	67–55
123	August 21	@ Reds	**W** 4–0	**Urías** (4–2)	DeSclafani (7–2)	—	28,752	68–55
124	August 22	@ Reds	**W** 18–9	**Chavez** (2–2)	Bailey (2–2)	—	15,690	69–55
125	August 23	Giants	**W** 9–5	**Maeda** (13–7)	Bumgarner (12–8)	**Jansen** (36)	46,899	70–55
126	August 24	Giants	**W** 1–0	**Hill** (10–3)	Cueto (14–4)	**Jansen** (37)	43,957	71–55
127	August 25	Giants	L 0–4	Moore (8–10)	**Stripling** (3–5)	—	53,297	71–56
128	August 26	Cubs	L 4–6 (10)	Wood (4–0)	**Liberatore** (2–1)	Chapman (10)	48,609	71–57
129	August 27	Cubs	**W** 3–2	**Urías** (5–2)	Hammel (13–7)	**Jansen** (38)	49,522	72–57
130	August 28	Cubs	**W** 1–0	**Blanton** (5–2)	Cahill (3–4)	**Jansen** (39)	44,745	73–57
131	August 29	@ Rockies	L 1–8	Gray (9–6)	**Maeda** (13–8)	—	24,308	73–58
–	August 30	@ Rockies	Postponed (rain) Rescheduled for August 31					
132	August 31	@ Rockies	L 0–7	Anderson (5–5)	**Stripling** (3–6)	—	24,790	73–59
133	August 31	@ Rockies	**W** 10–8	**Avilán** (1–0)	Ottavino (0–1)	**Jansen** (40)	22,683	74–59

September (17–10)

#	Date	Opponent	Score	Win	Loss	Save	Attendance	Record
134	September 2	Padres	L 2–4	Hand (4–3)	**Liberatore** (2–2)	Maurer (7)	48,911	74–60
135	September 3	Padres	**W** 5–1	**Hill** (11–3)	Perdomo (7–8)	—	47,590	75–60
136	September 4	Padres	**W** 7–4	**De León** (1–0)	Quackenbush (7–5)	**Jansen** (41)	46,441	76–60
137	September 5	Diamondbacks	**W** 10–2	**Maeda** (14–8)	Greinke (12–5)	—	41,820	77–60
138	September 6	Diamondbacks	**W** 5–2	**Stripling** (4–6)	Miller (2–11)	**Jansen** (42)	42,457	78–60
139	September 7	Diamondbacks	**W** 3–1	**Stewart** (1–2)	Ray (7–13)	**Jansen** (43)	44,352	79–60
140	September 9	@ Marlins	L 1–4	Fernández (14–8)	**Kershaw** (11–3)	Ramos (33)	22,940	79–61
141	September 10	@ Marlins	**W** 5–0	**Hill** (12–3)	Koehler (9–11)	—	20,933	80–61
142	September 11	@ Marlins	L 0–3	Ureña (4–6)	**Maeda** (14–9)	Ramos (34)	20,188	80–62
143	September 12	@ Yankees	**W** 8–2	**De León** (2–0)	Mitchell (1–1)	—	32,058	81–62
144	September 13	@ Yankees	L 0–3	Warren (3–1)	**Stripling** (4–7)	Betances (11)	32,615	81–63
145	September 14	@ Yankees	**W** 2–0	**Avilán** (2–0)	Betances (3–5)	**Jansen** (44)	30,254	82–63
146	September 15	@ Diamondbacks	L 3–7	Bradley (7–9)	**Hill** (12–4)	Corbin (1)	27,126	82–64
147	September 16	@ Diamondbacks	**W** 3–2	**Maeda** (15–9)	Greinke (12–7)	**Jansen** (45)	28,211	83–64
148	September 17	@ Diamondbacks	**W** 6–2	**Stewart** (2–2)	Miller (2–12)	—	38,255	84–64
149	September 18	@ Diamondbacks	L 9–10 (12)	Koch (1–0)	**Stripling** (4–8)	—	26,159	84–65
150	September 19	Giants	**W** 2–1	**Blanton** (6–2)	López (1–3)	—	43,435	85–65
151	September 20	Giants	L 0–2	Cueto (17–5)	**Hill** (12–5)	Romo (1)	53,621	85–66
152	September 21	Giants	**W** 9–3	**Maeda** (16–9)	Moore (4–5)	—	45,983	86–66
153	September 22	Rockies	**W** 7–4	**Avilán** (3–0)	Logan (2–4)	**Jansen** (46)	48,344	87–66
154	September 23	Rockies	**W** 5–2	**Stripling** (5–8)	Gray (10–9)	**Jansen** (47)	52,320	88–66
155	September 24	Rockies	**W** 14–1	**Kershaw** (12–3)	Bettis (13–8)	—	53,299	89–66
156	September 25	Rockies	**W** 4–3 (10)	**Blanton** (7–2)	Logan (2–5)	—	51,962	90–66
157	September 27	@ Padres	L 1–7	Clemens (4–5)	**Maeda** (16–10)	—	27,376	90–67
158	September 28	@ Padres	L 5–6	Perdomo (9–10)	**Stripling** (5–9)	Maurer (13)	29,471	90–68
159	September 29	@ Padres	**W** 9–4	**Anderson** (1–2)	Friedrich (5–12)	—	35,804	91–68
160	September 30	@ Giants	L 3–9	Bumgarner (15–9)	**McCarthy** (2–3)	—	41,359	91–69

October (0–2)

#	Date	Opponent	Score	Win	Loss	Save	Attendance	Record
161	October 1	@ Giants	L 0–3	Blach (1–0)	**Kershaw** (12–4)	Romo (4)	41,320	91–70
162	October 2	@ Giants	L 1–7	Moore (6–5)	**Maeda** (16–11)	—	41,445	91–71

Legend: = Win = Loss = Postponement
Bold = Dodgers team member

== Postseason ==
=== Postseason Game log ===
2016 Postseason (5–6)
National League Division Series (3–2)

Game	Date	Opponent	Score	Win	Loss	Save	Attendance	Series
1	October 7	@ Nationals	**W** 4–3	**Kershaw** (1–0)	Scherzer (0–1)	**Jansen** (1)	43,915	1–0
–	October 8	@ Nationals	Postponed (rain) Rescheduled for October 9					
2	October 9	@ Nationals	L 2–5	Treinen (1–0)	**Hill** (0–1)	Melancon (1)	43,826	1–1
3	October 10	Nationals	L 3–8	Solis (1–0)	**Maeda** (0–1)	—	53,901	1–2
4	October 11	Nationals	**W** 6–5	**Blanton** (1–0)	Treinen (1–1)	**Jansen** (2)	49,617	2–2
5	October 13	@ Nationals	**W** 4–3	**Urías** (1–0)	Rzepczynski (0–1)	**Kershaw** (1)	43,936	3–2

National League Championship Series (2–4)

Game	Date	Opponent	Score	Win	Loss	Save	Attendance	Series
1	October 15	@ Cubs	L 4–8	Chapman (1–0)	**Blanton** (0–1)	—	42,376	0–1
2	October 16	@ Cubs	**W** 1–0	**Kershaw** (1–0)	Hendricks (0–1)	**Jansen** (1)	42,384	1–1
3	October 18	Cubs	**W** 6–0	**Hill** (1–0)	Arrieta (0–1)	—	54,269	2–1
4	October 19	Cubs	L 2–10	Montgomery (1–0)	**Urías** (0–1)	—	54,449	2–2
5	October 20	Cubs	L 4–8	Lester (1–0)	**Blanton** (0–2)	—	54,449	2–3
6	October 22	@ Cubs	L 0–5	Hendricks (1–1)	**Kershaw** (1–1)	—	42,386	2–4

Legend: = Win = Loss = Postponement
Bold = Dodgers team member

Playoff Rosters
National League Division Series

- Pitchers: 7 Julio Urías 18 Kenta Maeda 22 Clayton Kershaw 43 Luis Avilán 44 Rich Hill 46 Josh Fields 52 Pedro Báez 55 Joe Blanton 68 Ross Stripling 74 Kenley Jansen 75 Grant Dayton
- Catchers: 9 Yasmani Grandal 15 Austin Barnes 51 Carlos Ruiz
- Infielders: 5 Corey Seager 6 Charlie Culberson 10 Justin Turner 23 Adrián González 26 Chase Utley
- Outfielders: 11 Josh Reddick 16 Andre Ethier 31 Joc Pederson 47 Howie Kendrick 60 Andrew Toles 66 Yasiel Puig

National League Championship Series

- Pitchers: 7 Julio Urías 18 Kenta Maeda 22 Clayton Kershaw 43 Luis Avilán 44 Rich Hill 46 Josh Fields 52 Pedro Báez 55 Joe Blanton 57 Alex Wood 68 Ross Stripling 74 Kenley Jansen 75 Grant Dayton
- Catchers: 9 Yasmani Grandal 51 Carlos Ruiz
- Infielders: 5 Corey Seager 10 Justin Turner 14 Enrique Hernández 23 Adrián González 26 Chase Utley
- Outfielders: 11 Josh Reddick 16 Andre Ethier 31 Joc Pederson 47 Howie Kendrick 60 Andrew Toles 66 Yasiel Puig

=== National League Division Series ===
The Dodgers faced the Washington Nationals in the Division Series. The series began on October 7 at Nationals Park in Washington, D.C. Corey Seager homered in the first inning and Justin Turner launched a two-run homer in the third as the Dodgers jumped out to a 4–0 lead against Max Scherzer. Clayton Kershaw struggled through five innings but he and the Dodgers bullpen held on to give the Dodgers a 4–3 win in the game. The second game of the series was scheduled for October 8, but the game was rained out and rescheduled for the next day. In game two, a three-run home run by José Lobatón off of Rich Hill in the fourth inning erased the Dodgers early two run lead and the Nationals added a few more runs off the bullpen to even the series with a 5–2 win. The Dodgers left 12 runners on base, and only had one hit in nine at-bats with runners in scoring position.

In Game three, at Dodger Stadium, the Nationals scored four runs (two on a homer by Anthony Rendon) in the fourth inning off of Kenta Maeda and then blew the game open with four more runs off of Kenley Jansen in the ninth, en route to an 8–3 win. Kershaw pitched in game four on short rest, for the fourth consecutive season. Adrián González homered in the first to give the Dodgers the early lead. Kershaw struck out 11 in 6 2/3 innings but was replaced by relief pitchers with two outs in the seventh and the bases loaded. Pedro Báez hit the only batter he faced to force in a run and then Daniel Murphy had a two-RBI single off of Luis Avilán to tie the score at 5. An RBI single by Chase Utley with two outs in the bottom of the eighth put the Dodgers back ahead and they won 6–5 to force a fifth and deciding game in the series.

In the fifth and final game of the series, at Nationals Park, Rich Hill on short rest struggled and didn't make it out of the third inning, but only gave up one run. Max Scherzer pitched well for the Nationals, holding the Dodgers scoreless for the first six innings. Joc Pederson hit a solo homer to lead off the seventh inning and tie the game. A two-out pinch-hit single by Carlos Ruiz off of Sammy Solis put the Dodgers ahead and Justin Turner's two-run triple extended it to 4–1. A two-run homer by pinch hitter Chris Heisey off Grant Dayton in the bottom of the inning made it 4–3 and the Dodgers brought in closer Kenley Jansen to get out of the inning. Jansen threw a career-high 51 pitches in the game, working into the ninth inning. Kershaw came into the game in relief with one out in the ninth, two days after throwing 110 pitches in game four. He induced a pop up by Daniel Murphy and struck out Wilmer Difo to end the game and send the Dodgers to the Championship Series.

=== National League Championship Series ===
The Dodgers advanced to face the Chicago Cubs in the Championship Series. In the first game at Wrigley Field, the Cubs got to Dodgers starter Kenta Maeda early, scoring three runs in the first two innings to take a 3–0 lead. Jon Lester allowed only one run (a pinch hit home run by Andre Ethier) in his six innings. A bases loaded single by Adrián González off Cubs closer Aroldis Chapman tied the game in the top of the eighth inning but the Cubs came back in the bottom of the inning. Miguel Montero hit a pinch hit grand slam off of Joe Blanton and Dexter Fowler followed it up with a solo homer of his own. The Cubs took game one 8–4. The second game was a pitchers' duel between Clayton Kershaw and Kyle Hendricks. Kershaw struck out six and only allowed two hits in seven scoreless innings while Hendricks allowed only three hits in 5 1/3 innings. Hendricks however allowed a solo homer to Adrián González for the only score of the game. Kenley Jansen pitched the last two innings and retired all six batters he faced to preserve the Dodgers 1–0 win, to even the series. This was the first time the Dodgers had won a Championship Series game on the road since game five of the 1988 NLCS against the Mets.

In game three at Dodger Stadium, Rich Hill pitched six scoreless innings, Yasmani Grandal and Justin Turner homered off of Jake Arrieta and the Dodgers cruised to a 6–0 win. Julio Urías started game four for the Dodgers, becoming the youngest pitcher to ever start a playoff game. Addison Russell and Anthony Rizzo both homered as the Cubs broke out with 13 hits in a 10–2 rout. The Dodgers committed four errors in the game, more than in any game all season and the most in a playoff game since game four of the 1974 NLCS. In the next game, Lester allowed only one run in seven innings, Russell hit a go-ahead homer off Joe Blanton in the 6th and the Cubs tagged on more runs off the bullpen to pull ahead in the series with an 8–4 win.

Kershaw returned to the mound in game six at Wrigley Field but was not nearly as sharp as his previous outing. He allowed five runs in five innings, including solo homers by Rizzo and Willson Contreras. Hendricks started for the Cubs and pitched 7 1/3 scoreless innings as the Cubs won the series with a 5–0 victory and headed to the World Series for the first time since 1945.

== Roster ==
2016 Los Angeles Dodgers
Roster
Pitchers: 35 Brett Anderson; 43 Luis Avilán; 52 Pedro Báez; 55 Joe Blanton; 46 Mike Bolsinger; 58 Jesse Chavez; 67 Louis Coleman; 75 Grant Dayton; 87 José De León; 77 Carlos Frías; 46 Josh Fields; 50 Casey Fien; 63 Yimi García; 41 Chris Hatcher; 44 Rich Hill; 56 J. P. Howell; 74 Kenley Jansen; 29 Scott Kazmir; 22 Clayton Kershaw; 36 Adam Liberatore; 18 Kenta Maeda; 38 Brandon McCarthy; 28 Bud Norris; 71 Josh Ravin; 99 Hyun-jin Ryu; 48,51 Brock Stewart; 68 Ross Stripling; 48 Nick Tepesch; 59 Chin-hui Tsao; 7,78 Julio Urías; 57 Alex Wood	Catchers: 15,28 Austin Barnes; 17 A. J. Ellis; 9 Yasmani Grandal; 51 Carlos Ruiz; Infielders: 6 Charlie Culberson; 23 Adrián González; 11,17 Micah Johnson; 5 Corey Seager; 25 Rob Segedin; 3 Chris Taylor; 10 Justin Turner; 26 Chase Utley	Outfielders: 3 Carl Crawford; 16 Andre Ethier; 14 Enrique Hernández; 47 Howie Kendrick; 31 Joc Pederson; 66 Yasiel Puig; 11 Josh Reddick; 21 Trayce Thompson; 60 Andrew Toles; 33 Scott Van Slyke; 25 Will Venable; 48 Zach Walters	Manager: 30 Dave Roberts; Coaches: 54 Josh Bard (bullpen); 13 Juan Castro (quality assurance); 82 Steve Cilladi (bullpen catcher); 85 Rob Flippo (bullpen catcher); 8 Bob Geren (bench); 40 Rick Honeycutt (pitching); 49 Tim Hyers (assistant hitting); 27 George Lombard (first base); 12 Turner Ward (hitting); 45 Chris Woodward (third base); 7 Steve Yeager (catching)

== Player stats ==
=== Batting ===
List does not include pitchers. Stats in bold are the team leaders.

Note: G = Games played; AB = At bats; R = Runs; H = Hits; 2B = Doubles; 3B = Triples; HR = Home runs; RBI = Runs batted in; BB = Walks; SO = Strikeouts; SB = Stolen bases; Avg. = Batting average; OBP = On-base percentage; SLG = Slugging; OPS = On Base + Slugging

Player	G	AB	R	H	2B	3B	HR	RBI	BB	SO	SB	AVG	OBP	SLG	OPS
Corey Seager	**157**	**627**	**105**	**193**	**40**	**5**	26	72	54	**133**	3	**.308**	**.365**	**.512**	**.877**
Adrián González	156	568	69	162	31	0	18	**90**	55	117	0	.285	.349	.435	.784
Justin Turner	151	556	79	153	34	3	**27**	**90**	48	107	4	.275	.339	.493	.832
Chase Utley	138	512	79	129	26	3	14	52	40	115	2	.252	.319	.396	.716
Howie Kendrick	146	487	65	124	26	2	8	40	50	96	**10**	.255	.326	.366	.691
Joc Pederson	137	406	64	100	26	0	25	68	63	130	6	.246	.352	.495	.847
Yasmani Grandal	126	390	49	89	14	1	**27**	72	**64**	116	1	.228	.339	.477	.816
Yasiel Puig	104	334	45	88	14	2	11	45	24	74	5	.263	.323	.416	.740
Trayce Thompson	80	236	31	53	11	0	13	32	26	66	5	.225	.302	.436	.738
Enrique Hernández	109	216	25	41	8	0	7	18	28	64	2	.190	.283	.324	.607
Josh Reddick	47	155	20	40	6	0	2	9	11	22	3	.258	.307	.335	.643
A. J. Ellis	53	139	8	27	5	0	1	13	16	24	1	.194	.285	.252	.537
Andrew Toles	48	105	19	33	9	1	3	16	8	25	1	.314	.365	.505	.870
Scott Van Slyke	52	102	10	23	6	0	1	7	5	24	1	.225	.292	.314	.606
Carl Crawford	30	81	8	15	2	1	0	6	4	11	0	.185	.230	.235	.464
Rob Segedin	40	73	9	17	2	1	2	12	6	22	0	.233	.301	.370	.671
Charlie Culberson	34	67	6	19	3	0	1	7	1	13	1	.284	.294	.373	.667
Chris Taylor	34	58	8	12	2	2	1	7	4	13	0	.207	.258	.362	.620
Carlos Ruiz	14	36	3	10	2	0	0	3	3	5	0	.278	.350	.333	.683
Austin Barnes	21	32	3	5	1	0	0	2	5	9	0	.156	.270	.188	.458
Andre Ethier	16	24	2	5	1	0	1	2	2	6	0	.208	.269	.375	.644
Will Venable	12	18	2	1	1	0	0	0	0	5	0	.056	.105	.111	.216
Micah Johnson	7	6	1	1	0	0	0	0	0	1	0	.167	.167	.167	.333
Zach Walters	3	5	0	0	0	0	0	0	0	2	0	.000	.000	.000	.000
Non-Pitcher Totals	162	5283	710	1341	270	21	188	663	517	1200	45	.256	.328	.424	.752
**Team totals**	**162**	**5518**	**725**	**1376**	**272**	**21**	**189**	**680**	**525**	**1321**	**45**	**.249**	**.319**	**.409**	**.728**

=== Pitching ===
Stats in bold are the team leaders.

Note: W = Wins; L = Losses; ERA = Earned run average; G = Games pitched; GS = Games started; SV = Saves; IP = Innings pitched; H = Hits allowed; R = Runs allowed; ER = Earned runs allowed; BB = Walks allowed; K = Strikeouts

Player	W	L	ERA	G	GS	SV	IP	H	R	ER	BB	K
Kenta Maeda	**16**	**11**	**3.48**	32	**32**	0	**175.2**	**150**	**72**	68	50	**179**
Clayton Kershaw	12	4	1.69	21	21	0	149.0	97	31	28	11	172
Scott Kazmir	10	6	4.56	26	26	0	136.1	133	71	**69**	**52**	134
Ross Stripling	5	9	3.96	22	14	0	100.0	96	46	44	30	74
Joe Blanton	7	2	2.48	**75**	0	0	80.0	55	23	22	26	80
Julio Urías	5	2	3.39	18	15	0	77.0	81	32	29	31	84
Pedro Báez	3	2	3.04	73	0	0	74.0	52	27	25	22	83
Kenley Jansen	3	2	1.83	71	0	**47**	68.2	35	14	14	11	104
Alex Wood	1	4	3.73	14	10	0	60.1	56	30	25	20	66
J. P. Howell	1	1	4.09	64	0	0	50.2	56	23	23	15	44
Louis Coleman	2	1	4.69	61	0	0	48.0	45	27	25	24	45
Adam Liberatore	2	2	3.38	58	0	0	42.2	34	16	16	17	47
Bud Norris	3	3	6.54	13	9	0	42.2	48	33	31	21	42
Chris Hatcher	5	4	5.53	37	0	0	40.2	40	26	25	21	43
Brandon McCarthy	2	3	4.95	10	9	0	40.0	29	24	22	26	44
Rich Hill	3	2	1.83	6	6	0	34.1	22	7	7	5	39
Brock Stewart	2	2	5.79	7	5	0	28.0	33	18	18	12	25
Mike Bolsinger	1	4	6.83	6	6	0	27.2	33	21	21	9	25
Grant Dayton	0	1	2.05	25	0	0	26.1	14	7	6	6	39
Jesse Chavez	1	0	4.21	23	0	0	25.2	28	14	12	8	21
Casey Fien	0	1	4.21	25	0	0	25.2	24	12	12	7	23
Luis Avilan	3	0	3.20	27	0	0	19.2	12	8	7	10	28
Josh Fields	1	0	2.79	22	0	0	19.1	20	8	6	8	22
José De León	2	0	6.35	4	4	0	17.0	19	17	12	7	15
Brett Anderson	1	2	11.91	4	3	0	11.1	25	15	15	4	5
Josh Ravin	0	0	0.93	10	0	0	9.2	2	1	1	4	13
Yimi García	0	0	3.24	9	0	0	8.1	9	3	3	1	4
Hyun-jin Ryu	0	1	11.57	1	1	0	4.2	8	6	6	2	4
Carlos Frías	0	0	0.00	1	0	0	4.0	2	0	0	1	3
Nick Tepesch	0	1	11.25	1	1	0	4.0	7	5	5	0	3
Chin-hui Tsao	0	1	5.40	2	0	0	1.2	1	1	1	3	0
**Team totals**	**91**	**71**	**3.70**	**162**	**162**	**47**	**1453.0**	**1266**	**638**	**598**	**464**	**1510**

== Awards and honors ==
Recipient	Award	Date awarded	Ref.
Clayton Kershaw	National League Pitcher of the Month (May)	June 2, 2016	
Corey Seager	National League Rookie of the Month (June)	July 2, 2016	
Kenley Jansen	All-Star	July 5, 2016	
Clayton Kershaw	All-Star	July 5, 2016	
Corey Seager	All-Star	July 5, 2016	
Chase Utley	Roy Campanella Award	September 22, 2016	
Corey Seager	Baseball America All-Rookie Team	October 5, 2016	
Kenta Maeda	Baseball America All-Rookie Team	October 5, 2016	
Corey Seager	Baseball America Rookie of the Year	October 14, 2016	
Corey Seager	Sporting News National League Rookie of the Year	October 24, 2016	
Dave Roberts	Sporting News National League Manager of the Year	October 24, 2016	
Corey Seager	Sporting News National League All-Star	October 26, 2016	
Kenley Jansen	Sporting News National League All-Star	October 26, 2016	
Kenley Jansen	Trevor Hoffman National League Reliever of the Year	October 29, 2016	
Corey Seager	Players Choice National League Outstanding Rookie	November 9, 2016	
Corey Seager	Silver Slugger Award	November 10, 2016	
Corey Seager	National League Rookie of the Year Award	November 14, 2016	
Dave Roberts	National League Manager of the Year	November 15, 2016	
Corey Seager	Topps All-Star Rookie Team	November 17, 2016	
Kenta Maeda	Topps All-Star Rookie Team	November 17, 2016	
Julio Urías	Topps All-Star Rookie Team	November 17, 2016	
Dave Roberts	Los Angeles Sports Council Coach of the Year	January 15, 2017	

== Transactions ==
=== April ===
- On April 3, placed pitchers Brett Anderson (herniated disc surgery), Brandon McCarthy (tommy john surgery) and Frankie Montas (rib resection surgery) on the 60-day disabled list, pitchers Mike Bolsinger (left oblique strain), Josh Ravin (left radius fracture) and Hyun-jin Ryu (left shoulder surgery), infielders Alex Guerrero (left knee contusion) and Howie Kendrick (left calf strain), catcher Yasmani Grandal (right forearm stiffness) and outfielder Andre Ethier (broken right tibia) on the 15-day disabled list and purchased the contract of infielder Charlie Culberson from AAA Oklahoma City.
- On April 9, placed outfielder Carl Crawford on the 15-day disabled list with lower back tightness and recalled IF Micah Johnson from AAA Oklahoma City.
- On April 10, acquired OF James Ramsey and IF/OF Zach Walters from the Cleveland Indians for cash considerations and optioned them to AAA Oklahoma City. Transferred OF Andre Ethier and RHP Josh Ravin from the 15-day disabled list to the 60-day disabled list.
- On April 11, optioned IF Micah Johnson to AAA Oklahoma City.
- On April 12, activated C Yasmani Grandal and IF Howie Kendrick from the 15-day disabled list and placed OF Scott Van Slyke on the 15-day disabled list with lower back irritation.
- On April 14, placed RHP Chris Hatcher on the paternity list and recalled LHP Adam Liberatore from AAA Oklahoma City.
- On April 15, recalled RHP Chris Hatcher from the paternity list and optioned C Austin Barnes to AAA Oklahoma City.
- On April 21, placed RHP Louis Coleman on the bereavement list and recalled LHP Luis Avilán from AAA Oklahoma City.
- On April 23, placed RHP Yimi García on the 15-day disabled list with right bicep soreness and recalled RHP Zach Lee from AAA Oklahoma City.
- On April 25, recalled RHP Louis Coleman from the bereavement list and optioned LHP Luis Avilán to AAA Oklahoma City.
- On April 26, activated OF Carl Crawford from the 15-day disabled list and optioned RHP Zach Lee to AAA Oklahoma City.

=== May ===
- On May 2, placed RHP Josh Ravin on the restricted list after he tested positive for the performance enhancing drug Growth Hormone Releasing Peptide 2 and was suspended 80 games by MLB.
- On May 7, claimed RHP Casey Fien off waivers from the Minnesota Twins and transferred LHP Hyun-jin Ryu from the 15-day disabled list to the 60-day disabled list.
- On May 9, optioned RHP Casey Fien to AAA Oklahoma City.
- On May 12, outrighted RHP Casey Fien to AAA Oklahoma City.
- On May 18, activated RHP Mike Bolsinger from the 15-day disabled list and optioned IF Charlie Culberson to AAA Oklahoma City.
- On May 19, optioned RHP Mike Bolsinger to AAA Oklahoma City and purchased the contract of RHP Chin-hui Tsao from AAA Oklahoma City.
- On May 23, optioned RHP Ross Stripling to AAA Oklahoma City, placed RHP Chin-hui Tsao on the 15-day disabled list with a right triceps strain and recalled RHP Mike Bolsinger and LHP Luis Avilán from AAA Oklahoma City.
- On May 26, optioned LHP Luis Avilán to AAA Oklahoma City.
- On May 27, transferred RHP Yimi García from the 15-day disabled list to the 60-day disabled list and purchased the contract of LHP Julio Urías from AAA Oklahoma City.
- On May 28, optioned LHP Julio Urías to AAA Oklahoma City, designated OF James Ramsey for assignment and purchased the contract of RHP Casey Fien from AAA Oklahoma City.
- On May 31, designated IF/OF Alex Guerrero for assignment. Placed LHP Alex Wood on the 15-day disabled list with left posterior elbow soreness and recalled LHP Julio Urías from AAA Oklahoma City.

=== June ===
- On June 3, placed OF Yasiel Puig on the 15-day disabled list with a strained left hamstring and activated OF Scott Van Slyke from the 15-day disabled list.
- On June 5, designated OF Carl Crawford for assignment and recalled C/IF Austin Barnes from AAA Oklahoma City.
- On June 12, activated RHP Frankie Montas from the 60-day disabled list and optioned him to AAA Oklahoma City.
- On June 14, signed free agent OF Will Venable and optioned C/IF Austin Barnes to AAA Oklahoma City.
- On June 19, optioned RHP Mike Bolsinger to AAA Oklahoma City and recalled RHP Carlos Frías from AAA Oklahoma City. Traded RHP Zach Lee to the Seattle Mariners in exchange for IF Chris Taylor.
- On June 21, activated OF Yasiel Puig from the 15-day disabled list and optioned RHP Carlos Frías to AAA Oklahoma City.
- On June 22, transferred LHP Chin-hui Tsao from the 15-day disabled list to the 60-day disabled list, and claimed RHP Layne Somsen off waivers from the New York Yankees. Optioned IF Chris Taylor and Somsen to AAA Oklahoma City.
- On June 24, purchased the contract of RHP Nick Tepesch from AAA Oklahoma City and designated OF Will Venable for assignment.
- On June 25, recalled IF Chris Taylor from AAA Oklahoma City and designated RHP Nick Tepesch for assignment.
- On June 28, claimed IF Cole Figueroa off waivers from the Pittsburgh Pirates and optioned him to AAA Oklahoma City.
- On June 29, placed IF/OF Enrique Hernández on the 15-day disabled list with ribcage inflammation, transferred LHP Alex Wood from the 15-day disabled list to the 60-day disabled list and purchased the contract of RHP Brock Stewart from AAA Oklahoma City.
- On June 30, acquired RHP Bud Norris, minor league OF Dian Toscano, a player to be named later, and cash considerations from the Atlanta Braves for minor league pitchers Caleb Dirks and Philip Pfeifer. Designated LHP Ian Thomas for assignment.

=== July ===
- On July 1, placed LHP Clayton Kershaw on the 15-day disabled list with mild disc herniation in his back and placed OF Joc Pederson on the 15-day disabled list with a sprained right AC joint. Activated RHP Bud Norris, purchased the contract of OF Will Venable from AAA Oklahoma City and designated RHP Layne Somsen for assignment.
- On July 3, activated RHP Brandon McCarthy from the 60-day disabled list, optioned RHP Brock Stewart to AAA Oklahoma City and outrighted RHP Yaisel Sierra to Advanced-Class A Rancho Cucamonga.
- On July 5, optioned LHP Julio Urías to AAA Oklahoma City and recalled LHP Luis Avilán from AAA Oklahoma City.
- On July 7, activated LHP Hyun-jin Ryu from the 60-day disabled list, recalled RHP Carlos Frías from AAA Oklahoma City, optioned LHP Luis Avilán to AAA Oklahoma City and designated OF Will Venable for assignment.
- On July 8, purchased the contract of OF Andrew Toles from AAA Oklahoma City, optioned RHP Carlos Frías to AAA Oklahoma City, and designated IF Cole Figueroa for assignment.
- On July 16, recalled OF Zach Walters from AAA Oklahoma City, and placed OF Trayce Thompson on the 15-day disabled list, retroactive to July 10, with a lower back injury.
- On July 19, placed RHP Casey Fien (retroactive to July 17) and LHP Hyun-Jin Ryu (retroactive to July 9) on the 15-day disabled list with elbow tendinitis and elbow discomfort respectively, reinstated OF Joc Pederson from the 15-day disabled list, and recalled LHP Luis Avilán from AAA Oklahoma City.
- On July 20, placed RHP Chris Hatcher on the 15-day disabled list with a strained left oblique and recalled IF Charlie Culberson from AAA Oklahoma City.
- On July 21, optioned IF Charlie Culberson and OF Zach Walters to AAA Oklahoma City, recalled LHP Julio Urías from AAA Oklahoma City, transferred RHP Chris Hatcher from the 15-day disabled list to the 60-day disabled list and purchased the contract of LHP Grant Dayton from AAA Oklahoma City.
- On July 22, optioned LHP Julio Urías to AAA Oklahoma City and recalled C Austin Barnes from AAA Oklahoma City.
- On July 23, optioned LHP Grant Dayton to AAA Oklahoma City and recalled RHP Ross Stripling from AAA Oklahoma City.
- On July 31, activated IF/OF Enrique Hernández from the 15-day disabled list and optioned C/IF Austin Barnes to AAA Oklahoma City.

=== August ===
- On August 1, acquired OF Josh Reddick and LHP Rich Hill from the Oakland Athletics in exchange for RHPs Jharel Cotton, Frankie Montas and Grant Holmes. Acquired RHP Jesse Chavez and cash considerations from the Toronto Blue Jays in exchange for RHP Mike Bolsinger. Acquired RHP Josh Fields from the Houston Astros for minor league 1B Yordan Alvarez. Transferred LHP Hyun-jin Ryu from the 15-day disabled list to the 60-day disabled list.
- On August 2, activated OF Josh Reddick and RHP Jesse Chavez, optioned RHP Ross Stripling, RHP Josh Fields and OF Yasiel Puig to AAA Oklahoma City.
- On August 3, activated RHP Josh Ravin from the restricted list and optioned him to AAA Oklahoma City, optioned OF Andrew Toles to AAA Oklahoma City, placed LHP Adam Liberatore on the 15-day disabled list with left elbow inflammation, placed RHP Louis Coleman on the 15-day disabled with arm fatigue, recalled RHP Brock Stewart, LHP Julio Urías and RHP Josh Fields from AAA Oklahoma City and transferred LHP Clayton Kershaw from the 15-day disabled list to the 60-day disabled list.
- On August 4, recalled LHP Grant Dayton from AAA Oklahoma City and optioned RHP Brock Stewart to AAA Oklahoma City.
- On August 6, placed RHP Bud Norris on the 15-day disabled list with a mild back strain and recalled RHP Ross Stripling from AAA Oklahoma City.
- On August 7, optioned IF Chris Taylor to AAA Oklahoma City, transferred OF Trayce Thompson from the 15-day disabled list to the 60-day disabled list and purchased the contract of IF/OF Rob Segedin from AAA Oklahoma City.
- On August 8, placed RHP Joe Blanton on the bereavement list and recalled RHP Josh Ravin from AAA Oklahoma City.
- On August 9, placed OF Scott Van Slyke on the 15-day disabled list with right wrist irritation and recalled IF Chris Taylor from AAA Oklahoma City.
- On August 12, activated RHP Joe Blanton from the bereavement list and optioned LHP Luis Avilán to AAA Oklahoma City.
- On August 14, activated LHP Brett Anderson from the 60-day disabled list, placed RHP Brandon McCarthy on the 15-day disabled list with right hip stiffness, placed RHP Josh Ravin on the 15-day disabled list with a right triceps strain, recalled RHP Brock Stewart from AAA Oklahoma City and designated OF Zach Walters for assignment.
- On August 16, activated RHP Casey Fien from the 15-day disabled list and optioned RHP Brock Stewart to AAA Oklahoma City.
- On August 19, activated RHP Bud Norris and LHP Adam Liberatore from the 15-day disabled list and optioned RHP Ross Stripling and RHP Casey Fien to AAA Oklahoma City.
- On August 20, recalled OF Andrew Toles from AAA Oklahoma City and optioned IF Chris Taylor to AAA Oklahoma City.
- On August 23, placed LHP Scott Kazmir on the 15-day disabled list with neck inflammation and LHP Brett Anderson on the 15 day disabled list with a left-index finger blister. Optioned RHP Josh Fields to AAA Oklahoma City, recalled RHP Ross Stripling, LHP Luis Avilán and IF Charlie Culberson from AAA Oklahoma City.
- On August 24, activated LHP Rich Hill from the 15-day disabled list and placed IF/OF Rob Segedin on the paternity list.
- On August 25, traded C A. J. Ellis, minor league pitcher Tommy Bergjans and a player to be named later to the Philadelphia Phillies for C Carlos Ruiz. Activated IF/OF Rob Segedin from the paternity list. Optioned LHP Luis Avilán to AAA Oklahoma City, transferred OF Scott Van Slyke from the 15-day to the 60-day disabled list and purchased the contract of C Shawn Zarraga from AAA Oklahoma City.
- On August 26, activated C Carlos Ruiz, optioned C Shawn Zarraga to AAA Oklahoma City, recalled RHP Brock Stewart from AAA Oklahoma City and optioned RHP Kenta Maeda to the Rookie-level Arizona Dodgers.
- On August 28, outrighted C Shawn Zarraga to AA Tulsa.
- On August 29, recalled RHP Kenta Maeda from the rookie-level Arizona Dodgers and optioned RHP Brock Stewart to AA Tulsa.
- On August 30, optioned RHP Pedro Báez to AA Tulsa and recalled RHP Casey Fien from AAA Oklahoma City.
- On August 31, recalled LHP Luis Avilán from AAA Oklahoma City to serve as the 26th man for the second game of a doubleheader. He returned to Oklahoma City after the game.

=== September ===
- On September 2, recalled C Austin Barnes, RHP Josh Fields and OF Yasiel Puig from AAA Oklahoma City and activated RHP Louis Coleman and RHP Josh Ravin from the 15-day disabled list.
- On September 3, purchased the contract of RHP José De León from AAA Oklahoma City.
- On September 5, recalled LHP Luis Avilán from AAA Oklahoma City.
- On September 6, recalled RHP Pedro Báez from AA Tulsa.
- On September 7, recalled RHP Brock Stewart from AA Tulsa.
- On September 9, activated LHP Clayton Kershaw from the 60-day disabled list, recalled RHP Carlos Frías from AAA Oklahoma City and placed him on the 60-day disabled list.
- On September 10, activated OF Andre Ethier from the 60-day disabled list and designated RHP Casey Fien for assignment.
- On September 19, recalled IF Micah Johnson from AAA Oklahoma City.
- On September 20, activated LHP Alex Wood from the 60-day disabled list and designated RHP Bud Norris for assignment.
- On September 22, activated LHP Brett Anderson from the 15-day disabled list.
- On September 23, activated LHP Scott Kazmir from the 15-day disabled list and recalled IF Chris Taylor from AAA Oklahoma City.
- On September 25, activated RHP Brandon McCarthy from the 15-day disabled list.

== Farm system ==
Level	Team	League	Manager	W	L	Position
AAA	Oklahoma City Dodgers	Pacific Coast League	Bill Haselman	81	60	1st place Lost in championship
AA	Tulsa Drillers	Texas League	Ryan Garko	68	71	2nd place
High A	Rancho Cucamonga Quakes	California League	Drew Saylor	79	61	2nd place Lost in playoffs
A	Great Lakes Loons	Midwest League	Gil Velazquez	65	75	6th place League Champions
Rookie	Ogden Raptors	Pioneer League	Shaun Larkin	21	17	1st place Lost in playoffs
Rookie	Arizona League Dodgers	Arizona League	John Shoemaker	32	22	1st place Did not qualify for playoffs
Rookie	DSL Dodgers 1	Dominican Summer League	Sergio Mendez	42	27	2nd place
Rookie	DSL Dodgers 2	Dominican Summer League	Keyter Collado	32	36	5th place

=== Minor League statistical leaders ===
==== Batting ====
- Average: Keibert Ruiz - Ogden - .374
- Home runs:Johan Mieses - Rancho Cucamonga -28
- RBI:
  Matt Beaty - Rancho Cucamonga - 88
  Willie Calhoun - Tulsa - 88
- OBP: D. J. Peters - Ogden - .437
- SLG: Cody Thomas - Ogden - .621

==== Pitching ====
- ERA: Brock Stewart - Oklahoma City - 1.79
- Wins: Chase De Jong - Oklahoma City - 15
- Strikeouts:
  Tommy Bergjans - Rancho Cucamonga - 133
  Chase De Jong - Oklahoma City - 133
- Saves: Scott Griggs - Tulsa - 12
- WHIP: Brock Stewart - Oklahoma City - 0.88

=== Mid-Season All-Stars ===
- All-Star Futures Game

Pitcher Jharel Cotton (world team)
Infielder Willie Calhoun (U.S. team)

- Pacific Coast League All-Stars

Infielder Rob Segedin

- Texas League All-Stars

Pitcher Scott Barlow
Pitcher Chase De Jong
Pitcher Caleb Dirks
Pitcher Trevor Oaks (did not play due to promotion to AAA)
Pitcher Jordan Schafer
Pitcher Brock Stewart (did not play due to promotion to AAA)
Catcher Kyle Farmer (did not play due to injury)
Catcher Paul Hoenecke
Second Baseman Willie Calhoun
Shortstop Drew Maggi
Outfielder Jacob Scavuzzo
Outfielder Alex Verdugo

- California League All-Stars

Pitcher Josh Sborz
Pitcher Andrew Sopko
Outfielder Kyle Garlick (did not play due to promotion to AA)

- Midwest League All-Stars

Pitcher Dennis Santana

- Pioneer League All-Stars

Pitcher Roberth Fernandez
First baseman Ibandel Isabel
Outfielder D. J. Peters
Manager Shaun Larkin

=== Post-Season All-Stars ===
- Pacific Coast League All-stars

Third baseman Rob Segedin

- Texas League All-Stars

Pitcher Chase De Jong (Texas League Pitcher of the Year)
Second Baseman Willie Calhoun
Outfielder Alex Verdugo

- California League All-Stars

Pitcher Josh Sborz (California League Pitcher of the Year)
Pitcher Andrew Sopko
Shortstop Erick Mejia
Third baseman Matt Beaty
Designated hitter Johan Mieses

- Pioneer League All-Stars

Outfielder D. J. Peters

=== Notes ===
- Brock Stewart and Edwin Rios were named the 2016 Dodgers minor league pitcher and player of the year.
- On August 28, the Oklahoma City Dodgers clinched their division title and a spot in the playoffs. They defeated the Nashville Sounds in five games to win their first round playoff series but lost to the El Paso Chihuahuas in four games in the PCL Championship Series.
- On September 4, the Great Lakes Loons clinched a playoff spot and defeated the Bowling Green Hot Rods in three games in the first round of the playoffs. They defeated the Clinton LumberKings in four games to win the Midwest League championship.
- The Rancho Cucamonga Quakes lost in three games to the Lancaster JetHawks in the California League South Division Finals.
- The Ogden Raptors made the Pioneer League playoffs but lost in three games in their first round series to the Orem Owlz.

== Major League Baseball draft ==
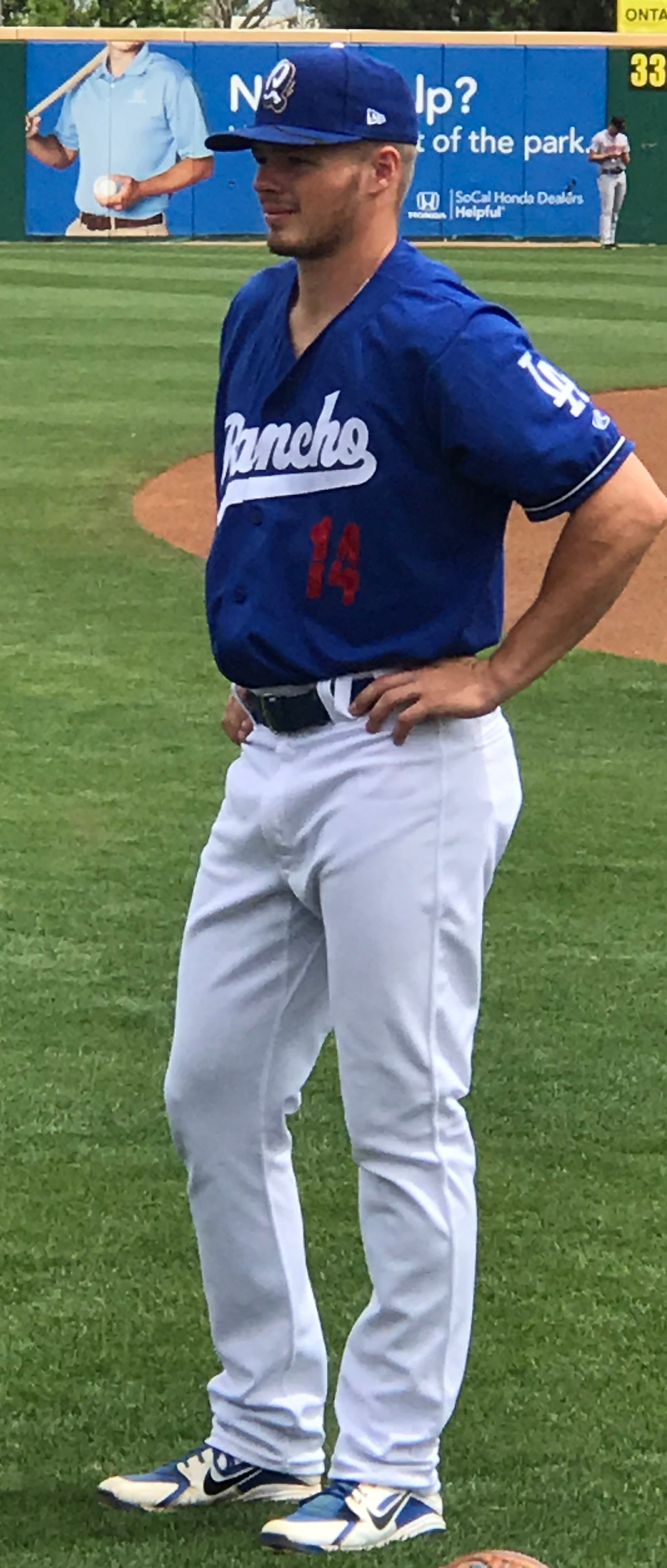
Gavin Lux

The Dodgers selected 42 players in this draft. They received a supplementary first round pick as a result of losing pitcher Zack Greinke to free agency and acquired a compensation competitive balance pick for failing to sign pitcher Kyle Funkhouser in the 2015 draft.

With the three first round picks, they selected shortstop Gavin Lux from Indian Trail High School and Academy in Kenosha, Wisconsin, catcher Will Smith from the University of Louisville and pitcher Jordan Sheffield from Vanderbilt University. 17 members of this draft class have played in the majors.

2016 draft picks

Round	Name	Position	School	Signed	Career span	Highest level
1	Gavin Lux	SS	Indian Trail High School and Academy	Yes	2016–present	MLB
1s	Will Smith	C	University of Louisville	Yes	2016–present	MLB
1s	Jordan Sheffield	RHP	Vanderbilt University	Yes	2016–2022	MLB
2	Mitchell White	RHP	Santa Clara University	Yes	2016–present	MLB
3	Dustin May	RHP	Northwest High School	Yes	2016–present	MLB
4	DJ Peters	OF	Western Nevada College	Yes	2016–2024	MLB
5	Devin Smeltzer	LHP	San Jacinto College North	Yes	2016–present	MLB
6	Errol Robinson	SS	University of Mississippi	Yes	2016–2025	AAA
7	Luke Raley	CF	Lake Erie College	Yes	2016–present	MLB
8	Andre Scrubb	RHP	High Point University	Yes	2016–present	MLB
9	Tony Gonsolin	RHP	Saint Mary's College of California	Yes	2016–present	MLB
10	Kevin Lachance	SS	University of Maryland, Baltimore	Yes	2017–2022	AAA
11	A. J. Alexy	RHP	Twin Valley High School	Yes	2016–2025	MLB
12	Graham Ashcraft	RHP	Huntsville High School	No; Reds - 2019	2019–present	MLB
13	Cody Thomas	OF	University of Oklahoma	Yes	2016–present	MLB
14	Dean Kremer	RHP	UNLV	Yes	2016–present	MLB
15	Brayan Morales	CF	Hillsborough Community College	Yes	2016–2019	AA
16	Darien Tubbs	CF	University of Memphis	Yes	2016–2017	AA
17	Dillon Persinger	2B	Golden West College	No; Indians – 2017	2017–2019	A+
18	Cole Freeman	2B	Louisiana State University	No; Nationals – 2017	2018–2023	AAA
19	Chris Mathewson	RHP	California State University, Long Beach	Yes	2016–2018	A+
20	Brock Carpenter	3B	Seattle University	Yes	2016–2019	A
21	James Carter	RHP	University of California, Santa Barbara	Yes	2016–2018	A+
22	Jeff Paschke	RHP	University of Southern California	Yes	2016–2017	Rookie
23	Bailey Ober	RHP	College of Charleston	No Twins–2017	2017–present	MLB
24	Saige Jenco	CF	Virginia Tech	Yes	2016–2020	A+
25	Chandler Eden	RHP	Texas Tech University	Yes		
26	Brandon Montgomery	2B	San Jacinto College	Yes	2016–2019	AAA
27	Austin French	LHP	Brown University	Yes	2016–2017	A
28	Jake Perkins	RHP	Ferrum College	Yes	2016	Rookie
29	Will Kincanon	RHP	Triton College	No; White Sox–2017	2017–2023	AA
30	Ramon Rodriguez	C	Puerto Rico Baseball Academy and High School	Yes	2016–present	AAA
31	Steve Berman	C	Santa Clara University	Yes	2016–2023	AAA
32	Conor Costello	RHP	Oklahoma State University	Yes	2016–2018	Rookie
33	Zach McKinstry	SS	Central Michigan University	Yes	2016–present	MLB
34	Joel Toribio	RHP	Western Oklahoma State College	Yes	2017–2019	Rookie
35	Nick Yarnall	LF	University of Pittsburgh	Yes	2016–2019	A+
36	Cal Stevenson	CF	Chabot College	No; Blue Jays–2018	2018–present	MLB
37	Enrique Zamora	RHP	Calumet College of St. Joseph	No	2017	Ind
38	Kevin Malisheski	CF	Wauconda High School	Yes	2016–2022	AA
39	Ryan Watson	RHP	Auburn High School	No	2021–present	AAA
40	Zachary Taglieri	RHP	Port St. Lucie High School	No	2021	Ind
