= Daniel Fields =

American baseball player (born 1991)

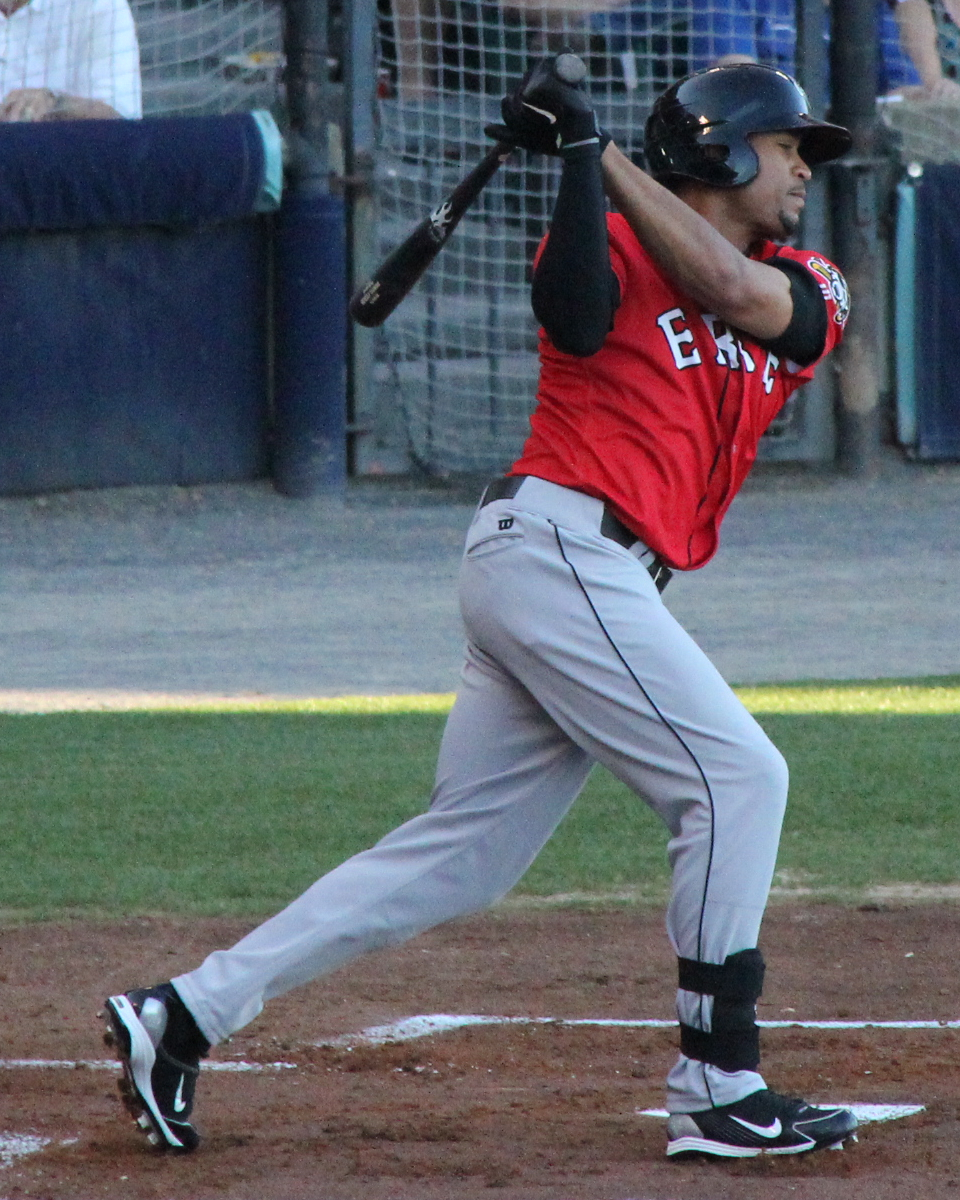
- Fields batting for the Erie SeaWolves, double-A affiliates of the Tigers, in 2013.
- Outfielder
- Born: January 23, 1991 (age 35); Detroit, Michigan, U.S.
- Batted: Left Threw: Right

MLB debut
- June 4, 2015, for the Detroit Tigers

Last MLB appearance
- June 4, 2015, for the Detroit Tigers

MLB statistics
- Batting average: .333
- Total bases: 2
- Runs: 1
- Stats at Baseball Reference

Teams
- Detroit Tigers (2015)

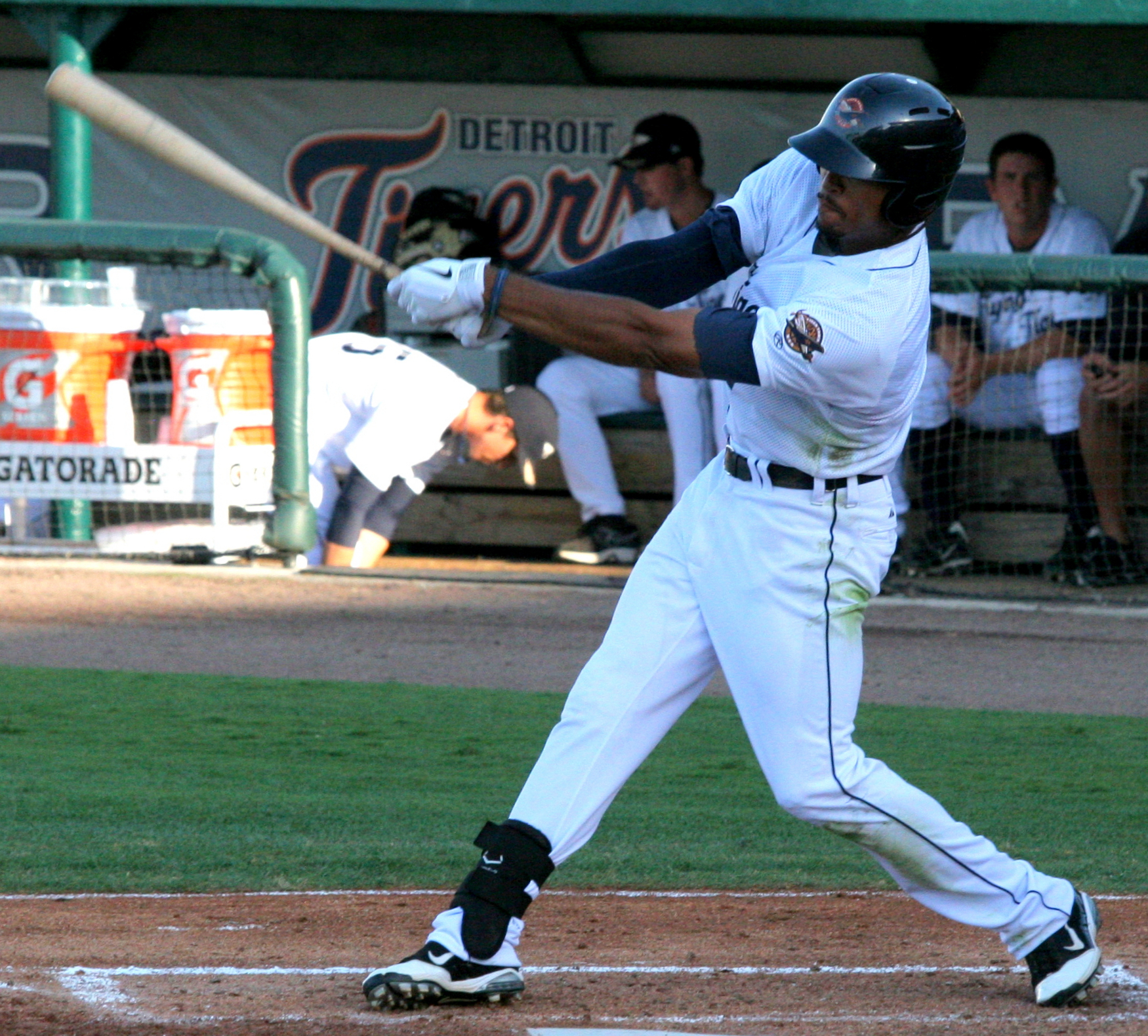
Fields batting for the Lakeland Flying Tigers, advanced-A affiliates of the Tigers, in 2012

Daniel L. Fields (born January 23, 1991) is an American former professional baseball outfielder. He played one game in Major League Baseball (MLB) for the Detroit Tigers in 2015.

He is the first player since Steve Kuczek in 1949 to hit a double and the first player since Gary Martz in 1975 to play left field in his only career Major League game.

== Career ==
=== Detroit Tigers ===
Fields was drafted by the Detroit Tigers in the sixth round of the 2009 Major League Baseball draft out of University of Detroit Jesuit High School and Academy in Detroit Michigan. Fields started his career with the High-A Lakeland Flying Tigers in 2010, and hit .240/.343/.371 with eight home runs. He spent the 2011 season with Lakeland hitting .220/.308/.326 with eight home runs. Fields again started the 2012 season with Lakeland but was promoted to Double-A Erie SeaWolves after hitting .266/.318/.357 with one home run in 62 games. In 29 games with Erie, he hit .264/.352/.358 with two home runs. Fields spent the 2013 season with Erie, hitting .284/.356/.435. He was added to the Tigers' 40-man roster on November 20, 2013, in order to be protected from the Rule 5 draft. Fields played for Erie, the Gulf Coast Tigers and Triple-A Toledo Mud Hens in 2014 and started the 2015 season with Toledo.

Fields was promoted to the major leagues for the first time on June 2, 2015. He made his major league debut on June 4, and recorded his first career major league hit, a double in the 9th inning off Dan Otero of the Oakland Athletics. He was designated for assignment by the Tigers on September 8. Fields struggled down the stretch, batting just .206 (52-for-253) to finish with a .229 (103-for-450) average, 26 doubles, eight triples, seven home runs, 41 RBI, and 17 stolen bases with the Mud Hens.

=== Chicago White Sox ===
Fields was claimed off waivers by the Milwaukee Brewers on September 10, 2015. On December 7, he was claimed off waivers by the Los Angeles Dodgers. Fields was designated for assignment by the Dodgers on December 30, following the signing of Scott Kazmir. On January 7, 2016, Fields was claimed off of waivers by the Chicago White Sox. He made 32 appearances for the Triple-A Charlotte Knights, batting .216/.311/.267 with one home run, 15 RBI, and four stolen bases. Fields was released by the White Sox organization on May 27.

=== Los Angeles Dodgers ===
On June 7, 2016, Fields signed a minor league contract with the Los Angeles Dodgers. He played in 10 games for the Triple-A Oklahoma City Dodgers and hit .250 with three RBI and two stolen bases. Fields also made five appearances each for the Single-A Great Lakes Loons and Double-A Tulsa Drillers. On August 4, Fields was released by the Dodgers organization.

=== Bridgeport Bluefish ===
Fields signed a minor league contract with the Arizona Diamondbacks organization on February 20, 2017. He was released by the Diamondbacks prior to the start of the regular season on March 27.

On April 11, 2017, Fields signed with the Bridgeport Bluefish of the Atlantic League of Professional Baseball. In 85 appearances for Bridgeport, he batted .297/.387/.487 with 12 home runs, 51 RBI, and one stolen base.

=== Long Island Ducks ===
On November 1, 2017, Fields was drafted by the Long Island Ducks in the Bridgeport Bluefish dispersal draft. Fields played in 96 games for the Ducks in 2018, hitting .267/.346/.425 with nine home runs, 40 RBI, and 12 stolen bases.

Fields played in 89 contests for Long Island during the 2019 season, batting .244/.325/.453 with 14 home runs, 36 RBI, and 11 stolen bases. Fields did not play in a game for the team in 2020 due to the cancellation of the season because of the COVID-19 pandemic.

Fields made 77 appearances for the Ducks in 2021, slashing .299/.409/.560 with 12 home runs, 48 RBI, and five stolen bases. He played in seven games for Long Island in 2022, and went 5-for-25 (.250) with one home run, four RBI, and one stolen base.

=== Charleston Dirty Birds ===
On May 10, 2022, Fields was traded to the Charleston Dirty Birds in exchange for a player to be named later. However, three days later, Fields retired from professional baseball.

== Personal life ==
Fields is the son of former MLB player, Bruce Fields.
