= Yaisel Sierra =

Cuban baseball player (born 1991)

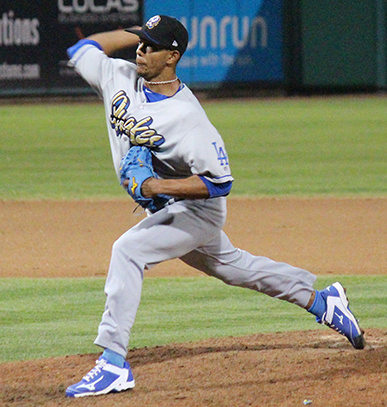
- Sierra pitching for the Rancho Cucamonga Quakes
- Pitcher
- Born: June 5, 1991 (age 35); Mayari, Cuba
- Bats: Right Throws: Right
- Stats at Baseball Reference

Yaisel Sierra
Medal record

Central American and Caribbean Games
Gold medal – first place	2014 Veracruz	Team

Yaisel Sierra Pérez (born June 5, 1991) is a Cuban former professional baseball pitcher.

== Career ==
=== Cuban career ===
Sierra played for Holguín and Sancti Spíritus in the Cuban National Series. He won with his national team, the gold medal of the 2014 Central American and Caribbean Games in Veracruz, Mexico.

In April 2015, Sierra defected from Cuba to the United States to pursue a Major League Baseball (MLB) career. Per reports on December 28, 2015, MLB cleared him as an unrestricted free agent eligible to sign with any team.

During a tryout in Florida in late 2015, Hudson Belinksky of Baseball America opined that Sierra appeared "extremely polished" with a "clean arm action," easily repeating "his moderate stride ... through release, ... consistently landing online and hitting his spots down in the strike zone." He threw a fastball in the mid 90s miles per hour and a slider.

=== Los Angeles Dodgers ===
On February 21, 2016, Sierra signed a six-year, $30 million, contract with the Los Angeles Dodgers. He was assigned to the Advanced-Class A Rancho Cucamonga Quakes, and was outrighted off the 40-man roster on July 3. In 20 games (13 starts for the Quakes and 10 relief appearances for the Double-A Tulsa Drillers, he was 6–7 with a 5.89 ERA, 86 strikeouts and 30 walks.

Sierra began the 2017 season with Tulsa and was promoted at mid-season to the Triple-A Oklahoma City Dodgers. Between the two teams, he was 5–1 with a 3.04 ERA in 39 relief appearances. He was assigned to AAA Oklahoma City Dodgers and was placed on the 7-day IL to start the 2019 season, making only three rehab appearances for the Arizona League Dodgers, recording an ERA of 3.00 with 6 strikeouts. Sierra did not play in a game in 2020 due to the cancellation of the minor league season because of the COVID-19 pandemic.

In 2021, Sierra made 23 appearances for Triple-A Oklahoma City, struggling to an 0-1 record with a 13.78 ERA and 18 strikeouts. On September 2, 2021, the Dodgers released Sierra.
