= Josh Ravin =

American baseball player (born 1988)

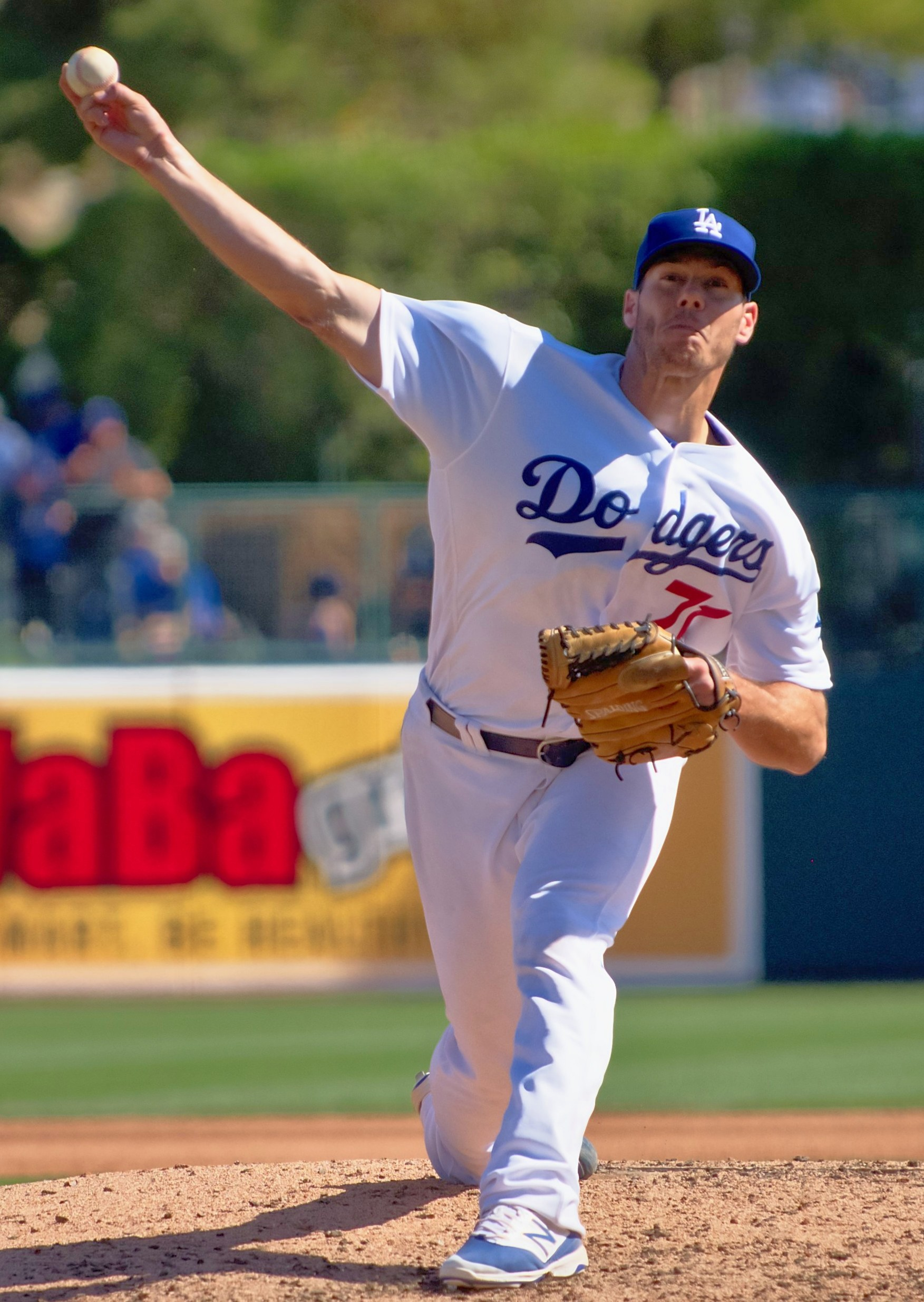
- Ravin pitching for the Los Angeles Dodgers during 2017 Spring Training
- Relief pitcher
- Born: January 21, 1988 (age 38); West Hills, California, U.S.
- Batted: Right Threw: Right

Professional debut
- MLB: June 2, 2015, for the Los Angeles Dodgers
- NPB: June 1, 2019, for the Chiba Lotte Marines

Last appearance
- MLB: April 20, 2018, for the Atlanta Braves
- MLB: June 4, 2019, for the Chiba Lotte Marines

MLB statistics
- Win–loss record: 2–3
- Earned run average: 5.12
- Strikeouts: 45

NPB statistics
- Win–loss record: 0–0
- Earned run average: 27.00
- Strikeouts: 1
- Stats at Baseball Reference

Teams
- Los Angeles Dodgers (2015–2017); Atlanta Braves (2018); Chiba Lotte Marines (2019)

Joshua Joseph Ravin (born January 21, 1988) is an American former professional baseball pitcher. He played in Major League Baseball (MLB) for the Los Angeles Dodgers and Atlanta Braves and in Nippon Professional Baseball (NPB) for the Chiba Lotte Marines.

== Early life ==
Josh Ravin was born in West Hills, California on January 21, 1988, to parents Virgil and Lana Ravin. He has an older brother, Joel and a younger sister, Amanda.

== Career ==
=== Cincinnati Reds ===
The Cincinnati Reds selected Ravin in the fifth round, 144th overall, of the 2006 MLB draft out of Chatsworth High School in Chatsworth, Los Angeles, California. He made his professional debut with the Gulf Coast Reds in 2006, and also appeared for the rookie-level Billings Mustangs. In 2007, Ravin pitched returned to Billings, where he recorded a 1–5 record and 8.55 ERA in 13 games. The following year, Ravin split the season between Billings and the Single-A Dayton Dragons, posting a cumulative 2–9 record and 7.77 ERA in 18 appearances. In 2009, Ravin returned to Dayton, where he pitched to a 3–8 record and 3.67 ERA with 66 strikeouts in 81.0 innings of work.

Ravin split the 2010 season between the High-A Lynchburg Hillcats, Dayton, and the AZL Reds, accumulating a 5–7 record and 3.89 ERA in 19 games between the three teams. Ravin was named the Carolina League pitcher of the week for August 9–15, 2010 while playing for Lynchburg. In 2011, Ravin split the season between the High-A Bakersfield Blaze and the Double-A Carolina Mudcats, logging a cumulative 2–10 record and 5.17 ERA with 114 strikeouts in 123.2 innings pitched. In 2012, Ravin split the year between Bakersfield and the Double-A Pensacola Blue Wahoos, posting a 1–3 record and 5.33 ERA in 23 games.

The Reds added Ravin to their 40-man roster after the 2012 season and invited him to spring training in 2013. He was designated for assignment by the Reds on September 16, 2013, after posting a 4.82 ERA in 48 combined games for Double-A Pensacola in the Southern League and the Triple-A Louisville Bats in the International League.

=== Milwaukee Brewers ===
On September 19, 2013, Ravin was claimed off waivers by the Milwaukee Brewers. On October 23, Ravin was outrighted off of the 40-man roster and assigned to the Triple-A Nashville Sounds. On November 4, 2013, he elected free agency.

=== Los Angeles Dodgers ===
On December 13, 2013, Ravin signed a minor league contract with the Los Angeles Dodgers organization. He split the 2014 season between the Double-A Chattanooga Lookouts and Triple-A Albuquerque Isotopes. With the two teams, he was 2–1 with a 3.55 ERA in 23 games. The Dodgers invited him to attend major league spring training in 2015 but he did not make the team and was assigned to the Triple-A Oklahoma City Dodgers to begin the year.

Ravin was called up to the majors for the first time on June 2, 2015. He made his MLB debut that night against the Colorado Rockies, striking out the only batter he faced, DJ LeMahieu, and picking up the win. He appeared in a total of nine games for the Dodgers in 2015, allowing seven runs in 9 1/3 innings. He also pitched in 22 games for Oklahoma City with a 3.86 ERA.

Ravin broke the radius bone in his left forearm in a multi-vehicle car crash on February 29, 2016. The injury required surgery. Ravin began the 2016 season on the 15-day disabled list. On May 10, Ravin was suspended for 80 games by MLB for testing positive for pralmorelin, a banned performance-enhancing drug. Ravin was reinstated on August 3, and optioned to Triple-A, but rejoined the Dodgers on August 8. He appeared in 10 games with Los Angeles, posting a 0.93 ERA in 9 2/3 innings in 2016.

Ravin suffered a groin injury in spring training in 2017, causing him to begin the season on the disabled list. He was taken off the DL and optioned to Oklahoma City on May 10. He did manage to appear in 14 games for the Dodgers in 2017, with a 6.48 ERA as well as 30 games for Oklahoma City, where he had a 5.09 ERA. His groin issue recurred all season, leading to several stints on the disabled list and he was eventually shut down for good on September 22. On November 20, 2017, Ravin was designated for assignment by the Dodgers.

=== Atlanta Braves ===
On November 20, 2017, Ravin was traded to the Atlanta Braves in exchange for cash considerations. On March 5, 2018, the Braves outrighted Ravin off the 40-man roster. On March 31, Ravin was called up by the Braves and had his contract purchased back to the 40-man roster by the team. He was designated for assignment on April 21, after he posted a 6.00 ERA in 2 big league games. He was outrighted to the Triple-A Gwinnett Stripers on April 25, 2018.

On June 14, 2018, while pitching for Gwinnett, Ravin was hit in the head by a line drive. After several minutes he was able to stand up but needed assistance exiting the field. He elected free agency on October 11, 2018.

=== Chiba Lotte Marines ===
On January 7, 2019, Ravin signed with the Chiba Lotte Marines of Nippon Professional Baseball (NPB). Ravin spent the majority of the year with Lotte's farm team, only making two appearances for the main club, where he struggled mightily, facing 12 batters and allowing 5 earned runs in 1 2/3 innings of work. On November 30, the Marines announced that they would not re-sign Ravin for the 2020 season. On December 2, he became a free agent.

=== Lexington Legends ===
On May 4, 2021, Ravin signed with the Lexington Legends of the Atlantic League of Professional Baseball. Ravin recorded a 2.57 ERA in 7 appearances before he was released on July 2.

== Personal life ==
Ravin's brother, Joel, was shot five times after being kidnapped on October 4, 2015, and survived. Joel died on March 28, 2023, after his body was discovered in a van fire in Woodland Hills.

== See also ==
- List of Major League Baseball players suspended for performance-enhancing drugs
