= Louis Coleman =

American baseball player (born 1986)

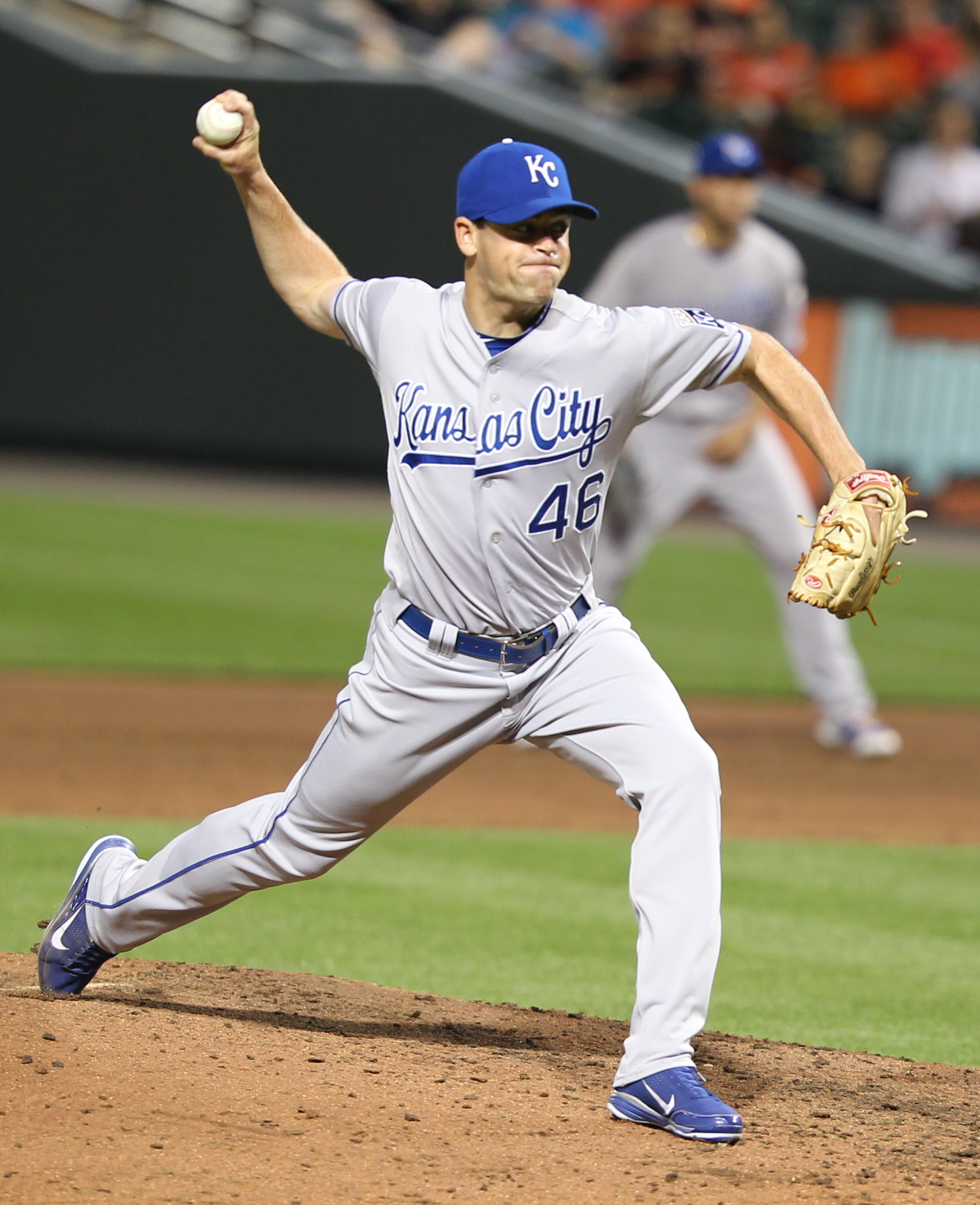
- Coleman with the Kansas City Royals
- Pitcher
- Born: April 4, 1986 (age 40); Greenwood, Mississippi, U.S.
- Batted: Right Threw: Right

MLB debut
- April 21, 2011, for the Kansas City Royals

Last MLB appearance
- September 29, 2018, for the Detroit Tigers

MLB statistics
- Win–loss record: 12–6
- Earned run average: 3.51
- Strikeouts: 272
- Stats at Baseball Reference

Teams
- Kansas City Royals (2011–2015); Los Angeles Dodgers (2016); Detroit Tigers (2018)

Harold Louis Coleman III (born April 4, 1986) is an American former professional baseball pitcher. He played in Major League Baseball (MLB) for the Kansas City Royals, Los Angeles Dodgers, and Detroit Tigers.

== Early life ==
Coleman was born in Greenwood, Mississippi, to Hal and Kathy Coleman. He graduated from Pillow Academy in Greenwood and attended Louisiana State University (LSU), where he played college baseball for the LSU Tigers baseball team. Coleman earned his agricultural business degree in May 2009.

== Professional career ==
=== Kansas City Royals ===
Coleman was drafted by the Kansas City Royals in the fifth round of the 2009 MLB draft, and was called up to the majors for the first time on April 21, 2011. That night, he pitched two scoreless innings against the Cleveland Indians in his major league debut. On May 11, 2011, Coleman recorded his first major league save by pitching a perfect 11th inning against the New York Yankees in Yankee Stadium.

The Royals placed Coleman on waivers in April 2015 with the purpose of removing him from their 40-man roster. He was re-added to the roster on September 7. On February 3, 2016, Coleman was released by the Royals.

=== Los Angeles Dodgers ===
On February 19, 2016, Coleman signed a one-year, $725,000 contract with the Los Angeles Dodgers. As a member of the Dodgers' bullpen in 2016, he pitched in 61 games with a 2–1 record, 4.69 ERA, and 45 strikeouts. On December 2, the Dodgers non-tendered Coleman, making him a free agent.

=== Cincinnati Reds ===
On January 10, 2017, Coleman signed a minor league contract with the Cincinnati Reds. In 25 appearances for the Triple-A Louisville Bats, he compiled a 2-1 record and 2.21 ERA with 44 strikeouts and 2 saves across 36 2/3 innings pitched. Coleman was released by the Reds organization on June 13.

=== Arizona Diamondbacks ===
On June 23, 2017, Coleman signed a minor league contract with the Arizona Diamondbacks. In 25 appearances for the Triple-A Reno Aces, he compiled a 2-1 record and 2.30 ERA with 33 strikeouts across 27 1/3 innings pitched. Coleman was released by the Diamondbacks organization on August 26.

=== Detroit Tigers ===
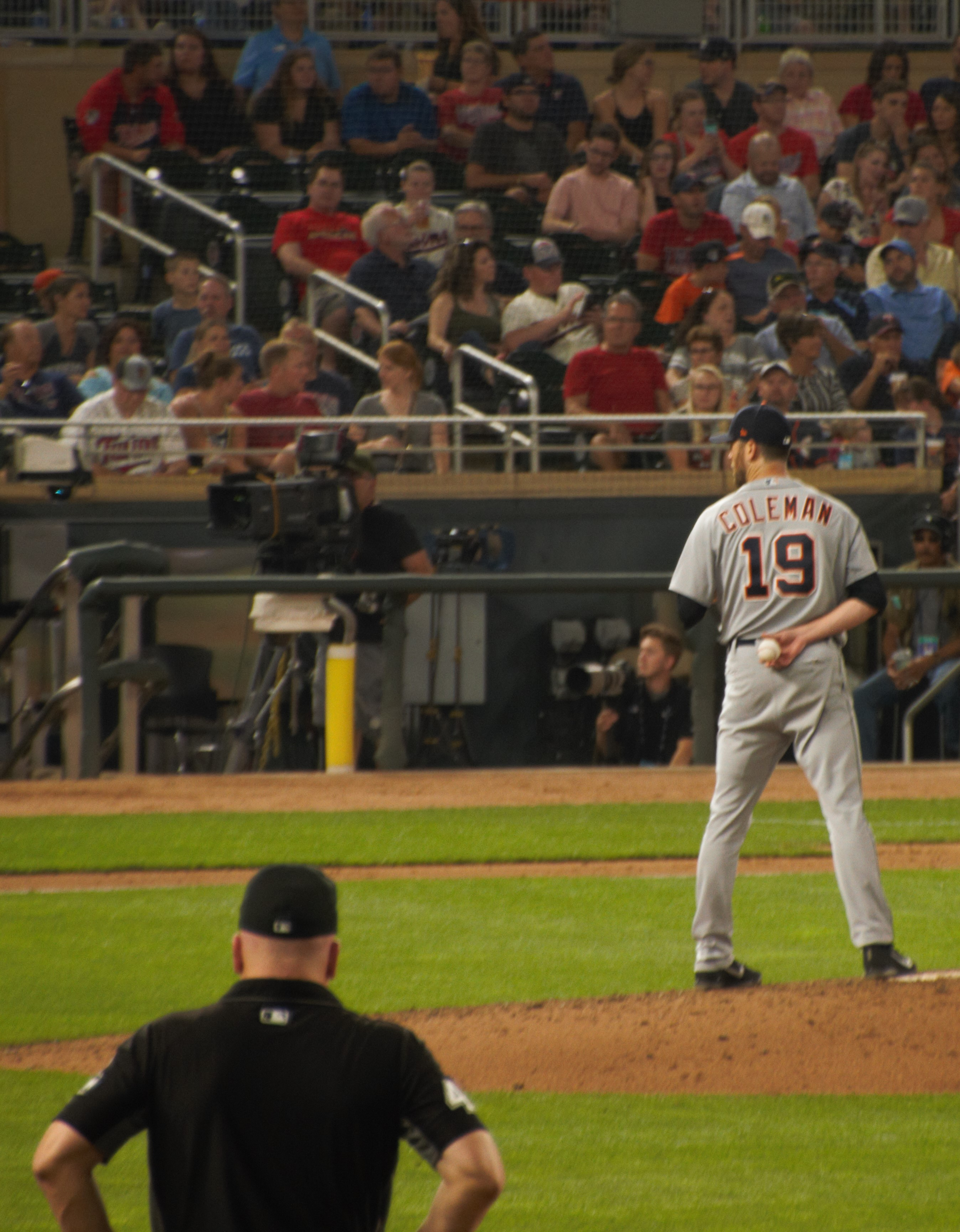
Coleman pitching for the Tigers against the Minnesota Twins in 2018

On February 23, 2018, Coleman signed a minor league contract with the Detroit Tigers. On May 12, the Tigers purchased Coleman's minor league contract and added him to the major league roster. In 51 1/3 relief innings for the Tigers, Coleman posted a 4–1 record with a 3.51 ERA and 41 strikeouts. On October 24, Coleman was removed from the 40-man roster and sent outright to the Triple-A Toledo Mud Hens, but he rejected the assignment and elected free agency the following day.

On November 29, 2018, Coleman re-signed with Detroit on a minor league contract.

=== New York Mets ===
On May 29, 2019, Coleman signed a minor league contract with the New York Mets. In 12 appearances for the Triple-A Syracuse Mets, he logged a 5.93 ERA with 12 strikeouts across 13 2/3 innings pitched. Coleman was released by the Mets organization on July 4.

== Pitching style ==
Coleman mostly throws a four-seam fastball (88 to 92 miles per hour (142 to 148 km/h)) and slider (78 to 81 miles per hour (126 to 130 km/h)), with an occasional changeup to left-handed hitters.
