= Zach Walters (baseball) =

American baseball player (born 1989)

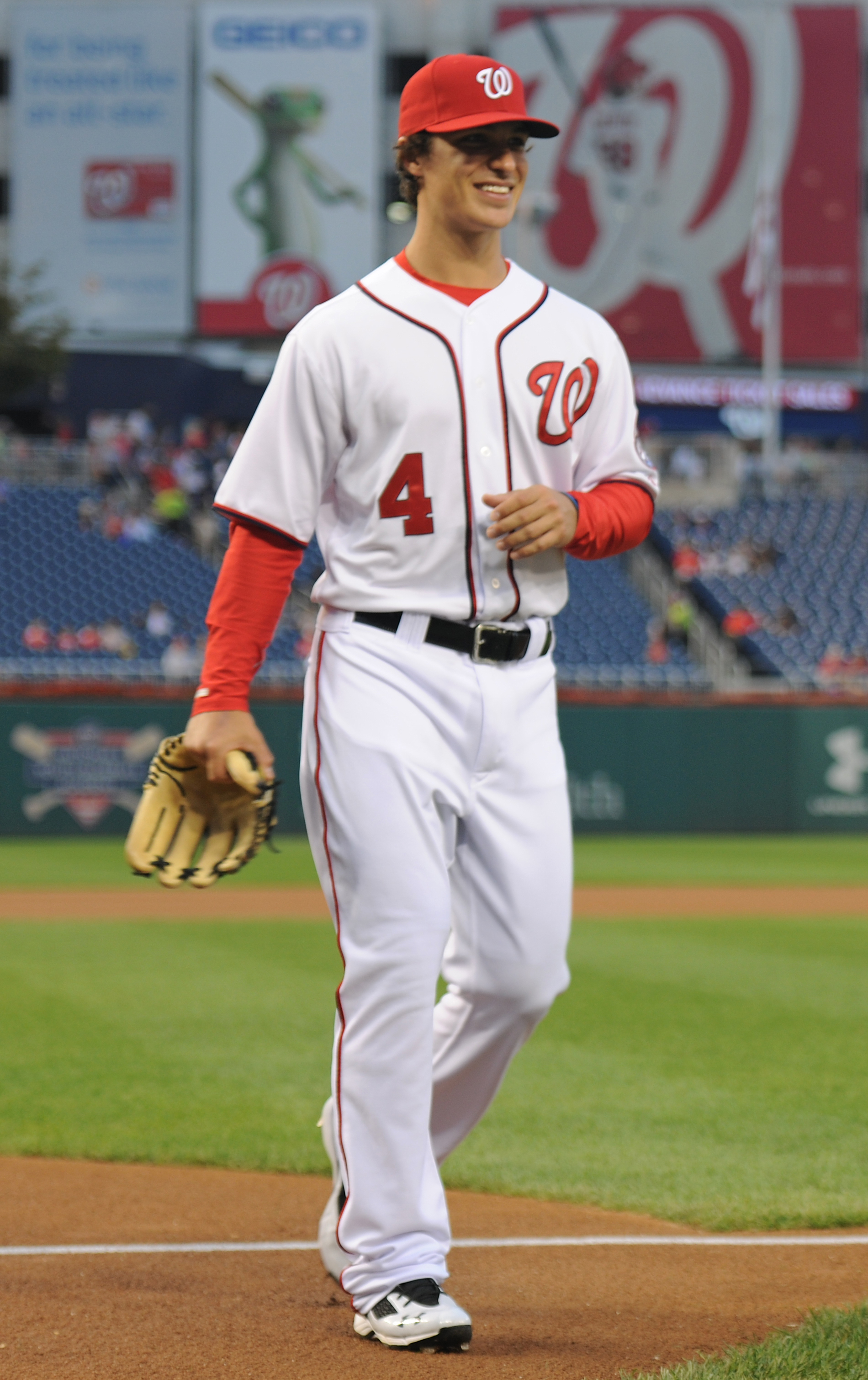
- Walters with the Washington Nationals in 2013
- Utility player
- Born: September 5, 1989 (age 36); Cheyenne, Wyoming, U.S.
- Batted: Switch Threw: Right

MLB debut
- September 6, 2013, for the Washington Nationals

Last MLB appearance
- July 20, 2016, for the Los Angeles Dodgers

MLB statistics
- Batting average: .176
- Home runs: 10
- Runs batted in: 21
- Stats at Baseball Reference

Teams
- Washington Nationals (2013–2014); Cleveland Indians (2014–2015); Los Angeles Dodgers (2016)

Zachary Butler Walters (born September 5, 1989) is an American former professional baseball utility player. He played in Major League Baseball (MLB) for the Washington Nationals, Cleveland Indians and Los Angeles Dodgers.

== Early life ==
Walters was born in Wyoming and raised in Bozeman, Montana. His family moved to Las Vegas, Nevada, when he was in the sixth grade, and he attended Cimarron-Memorial High School. He attended the University of San Diego, where he played college baseball for the San Diego Toreros.

== Career ==
=== Arizona Diamondbacks ===
The Arizona Diamondbacks drafted Walters in the ninth round, with the 271st overall selection, of the 2010 Major League Baseball draft. He was assigned to the Low–A Yakima Bears, where in 69 games, he hit .302/.338/.440 with four home runs, 43 RBI and 44 runs. Walters was a Northwest League Post-Season All-Star, joining first baseman Yazy Arbelo and left-handed reliever Eury De La Rosa as Bears on the squad. Walters began 2011 with the Single–A South Bend Silver Hawks, where he was used at shortstop, third and second base, and off the bench with the Silver Hawks. Elected to the Midwest League All-Star Game, he was hitting .316/.406/.527 with seven home runs, 42 RBI and 50 runs in 66 first–half games.

=== Washington Nationals ===
On July 30, 2011, Walters was traded to the Washington Nationals in exchange for Jason Marquis and was assigned to the High–A Potomac Nationals. Used as the Potomac Nationals shortstop to end the season, Walters, in 127 total games, hit .300/.367/.457 with nine home runs, 67 RBI, 84 runs and 19 stolen bases. Walters began 2012 at Potomac, where in 54 games, .269/.304/.399 with five home runs and 24 RBI before being promoted to the Double–A Harrisburg Senators on June 18. In 43 games as the Senators shortstop, Walters hit .293/.326/.518 with six home runs and 19 RBI before being promoted to the Triple–A Syracuse Chiefs on August 3. He finished the year there, and in 126 total games, he hit .266/.302/.418 with 12 home runs, 49 RBI and 56 runs. Walters spent most of 2013 with the Chiefs, where in 134 games, he hit .253/.286/.517 with 29 home runs and 77 RBI. He led the league in home runs, extra base hits (66), and total bases (247).

On September 3, 2013, Walters was promoted to the major leagues for the first time. He made his first appearance on September 6, against the Miami Marlins as a pinch hitter, and recorded his first major league hit, an infield single off of José Fernández that broke up Fernández's no-hitter in the 6th inning. His first major league start came in the last game of the season, when he went 1–4 with an RBI triple and a run at shortstop.

On April 15, 2014, Walters hit the first home run of his career. In 32 games for the Nationals, he slashed .205/.279/.462 with three home runs and five RBI.

=== Cleveland Indians ===
On July 31, 2014, Walters was traded to the Cleveland Indians in exchange for Asdrúbal Cabrera and cash considerations. He was sent from Washington's minor league team in Syracuse to the Indians' Triple–A affiliate, the Columbus Clippers. He hit two home runs there in the first four days after joining the club, one a grand slam, on August 3. In 30 games for Cleveland in 2014, he batted .170/.223/.432 with seven home runs and 12 RBI.

Walters injured his oblique muscle on March 13, 2015. After Walters had the injury, he started a rehab assignment with the Clippers on April 20. The versatile switch–hitter was called up on June 9, with Giovanny Urshela while José Ramírez and Lonnie Chisenhall were demoted to the Clippers. In 12 total games for the Indians, Walters went 4–for–30 (.133) with 3 RBI. On April 3, 2016, Walters was designated for assignment by the Indians.

=== Los Angeles Dodgers ===
On April 10, 2016, the Indians traded Walters and James Ramsey to the Los Angeles Dodgers in exchange for cash considerations. He was assigned to the Triple–A Oklahoma City Dodgers and then recalled to the majors on July 16. In three games with the Dodgers, he was hitless in five at–bats. He also played in 94 games for Oklahoma City, hitting .276 with 10 homers and 53 RBI. He was designated for assignment on August 14 and released the following day.

On August 17, 2016, Walters re–signed with the Dodgers organization on a minor league contract. He elected free agency following the season on November 7.

=== Cincinnati Reds ===
On February 1, 2017, Walters signed a minor league contract with the Cincinnati Reds organization. After hitting .174 in 11 games for the Triple–A Louisville Bats, he was released on May 14.

=== Kansas City T-Bones ===
On May 27, 2017, Walters signed with the Kansas City T-Bones of the American Association of Independent Professional Baseball. In 18 games for Kansas City, Walters slashed .347/.363/.653 with six home runs and 20 RBI.

=== Kansas City Royals ===
On June 15, 2017, Walters signed a minor league deal with the Kansas City Royals. He spent the remainder of the year with the Double–A Northwest Arkansas Naturals, also playing in one game for the Triple–A Omaha Storm Chasers. In 24 games for the Naturals, Walters batted .211/.250/.278 with one home run and 8 RBI. He elected free agency following the season on November 6.

=== Kansas City T-Bones (second stint) ===
On February 10, 2018, Walters signed with the Kansas City T-Bones of the American Association of Independent Professional Baseball. In 46 games for the T-Bones, Walters slashed .279/.307/.437 with six home runs and 34 RBI.

=== St. Paul Saints ===
On July 9, 2018, Walters was traded to the St. Paul Saints in exchange for Noah Perio. In 51 games for the Saints, he batted .300/.336/.502 with nine home runs and 38 RBI. Walters was released by Kansas City on October 18.
