= 2016 Arizona Diamondbacks season =

2016 Arizona Diamondbacks
- League: National League
- Division: West
- Ballpark: Chase Field
- City: Phoenix, Arizona
- Record: 69–93 (.426)
- Divisional place: 4th
- Owners: Ken Kendrick
- General managers: Dave Stewart
- Managers: Chip Hale
- Television: Fox Sports Arizona (Steve Berthiaume, Bob Brenly, Greg Schulte)
- Radio: KMVP-FM (98.7) (Greg Schulte, Tom Candiotti, Mike Ferrin); KSUN (Spanish)
- Stats: ESPN.com; Baseball Reference

The Arizona Diamondbacks' 2016 season was the franchise's 19th season in Major League Baseball and their 19th season at Chase Field and in Phoenix, Arizona. The team finished at 69–93 for their third consecutive losing season, while spending a majority of the season in a back-and-forth battle with the San Diego Padres at the bottom of the National League West standings. The Diamondbacks finished in fourth place. Following the season, General Manager Dave Stewart and Manager Chip Hale were fired.

== Regular season ==
=== Season standings ===
==== National League West ====
NL West
Team	W	L	Pct.	GB	Home	Road
Los Angeles Dodgers	91	71	.562	—	53‍–‍28	38‍–‍43
San Francisco Giants	87	75	.537	4	45‍–‍36	42‍–‍39
Colorado Rockies	75	87	.463	16	42‍–‍39	33‍–‍48
Arizona Diamondbacks	69	93	.426	22	33‍–‍48	36‍–‍45
San Diego Padres	68	94	.420	23	39‍–‍42	29‍–‍52

==== National League Wild Card ====
Division leaders
Team	W	L	Pct.
Chicago Cubs	103	58	.640
Washington Nationals	95	67	.586
Los Angeles Dodgers	91	71	.562

Wild Card teams (Top 2 teams qualify for postseason)
Team	W	L	Pct.	GB
New York Mets	87	75	.537	—
San Francisco Giants	87	75	.537	—
St. Louis Cardinals	86	76	.531	1
Miami Marlins	79	82	.491	7½
Pittsburgh Pirates	78	83	.484	8½
Colorado Rockies	75	87	.463	12
Milwaukee Brewers	73	89	.451	14
Philadelphia Phillies	71	91	.438	16
Arizona Diamondbacks	69	93	.426	18
Atlanta Braves	68	93	.422	18½
San Diego Padres	68	94	.420	19
Cincinnati Reds	68	94	.420	19

==== Record vs. opponents ====
2016 National League record Source: MLB Standings Grid – 2016
Team	AZ	ATL	CHC	CIN	COL	LAD	MIA	MIL	NYM	PHI	PIT	SD	SF	STL	WSH	AL
Arizona	—	5–2	2–5	3–3	10–9	7–12	2–4	3–4	5–1	4–3	1–5	10–9	6–13	4–3	2–5	5–15
Atlanta	2–5	—	3–3	3–4	1–6	1–5	11–7	2–5	10–9	11–8	3–4	4–2	3–4	2–4	4–15	8–12
Chicago	5–2	3–3	—	15–4	2–4	4–3	4–3	11–8	2–5	5–1	14–4	4–2	4–3	10–9	5–2	15–5
Cincinnati	3–3	4–3	4–15	—	5–2	2–5	3–4	11–8	0–6	4–2	9–10	3–4	3–3	9–10	3–4	5–15
Colorado	9–10	6–1	4–2	2–5	—	7–12	2–5	1–5	6–1	2–5	2–5	10–9	9–10	2–4	4–2	9–11
Los Angeles	12–7	5–1	3–4	5–2	12–7	—	1–6	5–2	4–3	4–2	2–5	11–8	8–11	4–2	5–1	10–10
Miami	4–2	7–11	3–4	4–3	5–2	6–1	—	4–2	7–12	9–10	6–1	3–3	2–4	4–3	9–10	6–14
Milwaukee	4–3	5–2	8–11	8–11	5–1	2–5	2–4	—	2–5	3–4	9–10	3–4	1–5	6–13	4–2	11–9
New York	1–5	9–10	5–2	6–0	1–6	3–4	12–7	5–2	—	12–7	3–3	4–3	4–3	3–3	7–12	12–8
Philadelphia	3–4	8–11	1–5	2–4	5–2	2–4	10–9	4–3	7–12	—	3–4	5–2	3–3	2–5	5–14	11–9
Pittsburgh	5–1	4–3	4–14	10–9	5–2	5–2	1–6	10–9	3–3	4–3	—	3–3	4–3	9–10	2–4	9–11
San Diego	9–10	2–4	2–4	4–3	9–10	8–11	3–3	4–3	3–4	2–5	3–3	—	8–11	1–6	4–3	6–14
San Francisco	13–6	4–3	3–4	3–3	10–9	11–8	4–2	5–1	3–4	3–3	3–4	11–8	—	3–4	3–4	8–12
St. Louis	3–4	4–2	9–10	10–9	4–2	2–4	3–4	13–6	3–3	5–2	10–9	6–1	4–3	—	2–5	8–12
Washington	5–2	15–4	2–5	4–3	2–4	1–5	10–9	2–4	12–7	14–5	4–2	3–4	4–3	5–2	—	12–8

=== Game log ===
2016 Game Log: 69–93 (Home: 33–48; Away: 36–45)
April: 12–14 (Home: 5–11; Away: 7–3)

#	Date	Opponent	Score	Win	Loss	Save	Attendance	Record
1	April 4	Rockies	5–10	Miller (1–0)	**Greinke** (0–1)	—	48,165	0–1
2	April 5	Rockies	11–6	**Clippard** (1–0)	Bergman (0–1)	—	21,830	1–1
3	April 6	Rockies	3–4	Chatwood (1–0)	**Corbin** (0–1)	McGee (1)	18,572	1–2
4	April 7	Cubs	6–14	Lackey (1–0)	**De La Rosa** (0–1)	—	24,656	1–3
5	April 8	Cubs	3–2	**Ziegler** (1–0)	Cahill (0–1)	—	27,539	2–3
6	April 9	Cubs	2–4	Hendricks (1–0)	**Greinke** (0–2)	Rondón (1)	32,185	2–4
7	April 10	Cubs	3–7	Arrieta (2–0)	**Miller** (0–1)	—	33,258	2–5
8	April 12	@ Dodgers	4–2	**Clippard** (2–0)	Hatcher (1–1)	**Ziegler** (1)	53,279	3–5
9	April 13	@ Dodgers	1–3	Wood (1–1)	**De La Rosa** (0–2)	Jansen (3)	44,244	3–6
10	April 14	@ Dodgers	2–5	Howell (1–0)	**Delgado** (0–1)	Jansen (4)	40,879	3–7
11	April 15	@ Padres	3–2	**Hudson** (1–0)	Rodney (0–1)	**Ziegler** (2)	28,955	4–7
12	April 16	@ Padres	3–5 (14)	Perdomo (1–0)	**De La Rosa** (0–3)	—	34,051	4–8
13	April 17	@ Padres	7–3	**Corbin** (1–1)	Erlin (1–2)	—	30,250	5–8
14	April 18	@ Giants	9–7 (11)	**De La Rosa** (1–3)	Heston (1–1)	**Ziegler** (3)	41,432	6–8
15	April 19	@ Giants	3–0	**Ray** (1–0)	Cain (0–2)	**Clippard** (1)	41,218	7–8
16	April 20	@ Giants	2–1	**Greinke** (1–2)	Bumgarner (1–2)	**Ziegler** (4)	41,497	8–8
17	April 21	@ Giants	6–2	**Wagner** (1–0)	Cueto (3–1)	—	41,052	9–8
18	April 22	Pirates	7–8	Niese (3–0)	**Corbin** (1–2)	Melancon (4)	27,829	9–9
19	April 23	Pirates	7–1	**De La Rosa** (2–3)	Nicasio (2–2)	—	32,935	10–9
20	April 24	Pirates	10–12 (13)	Feliz (1–0)	**Marshall** (0–1)	Caminero (1)	27,573	10–10
21	April 25	Cardinals	12–7	**Greinke** (2–2)	Bowman (0–1)	—	18,208	11–10
22	April 26	Cardinals	2–8	Martínez (4–0)	**Miller** (0–2)	—	19,074	11–11
23	April 27	Cardinals	4–11	Wainwright (1–3)	**Corbin** (1–3)	—	18,339	11–12
24	April 28	Cardinals	3–0	**De La Rosa** (3–3)	Wacha (2–1)	**Ziegler** (5)	18,933	12–12
25	April 29	Rockies	0–9	Chatwood (3–2)	**Ray** (1–1)	—	23,004	12–13
26	April 30	Rockies	2–5	Qualls (2–0)	**Ziegler** (1–1)	McGee (5)	32,987	12–14

May: 11–17 (Home: 4–9; Away: 7–8)

#	Date	Opponent	Score	Win	Loss	Save	Attendance	Record
27	May 1	Rockies	3–6	Bettis (3–1)	**Miller** (0–3)	McGee (6)	25,458	12–15
28	May 3	@ Marlins	4–7	Nicolino (2–0)	**Chafin** (0–1)	Ramos (8)	16,323	12–16
29	May 4	@ Marlins	3–4	Fernández (3–2)	**De La Rosa** (3–4)	Ramos (9)	17,043	12–17
30	May 5	@ Marlins	0–4	Conley (2–1)	**Ray** (1–2)	—	16,704	12–18
31	May 6	@ Braves	7–2	**Greinke** (3–2)	Blair (0–2)	—	23,514	13–18
32	May 7	@ Braves	4–2	**Miller** (1–3)	Norris (1–5)	**Ziegler** (6)	22,178	14–18
33	May 8	@ Braves	5–3 (11)	**Delgado** (1–1)	Johnson (0–4)	**Ziegler** (7)	17,106	15–18
34	May 9	@ Rockies	10–5	**Bradley** (1–0)	Chatwood (4–3)	—	22,053	16–18
35	May 10	@ Rockies	5–1	**De La Rosa** (4–4)	Rusin (1–1)	—	23,363	17–18
36	May 11	@ Rockies	7–8	Germen (1–0)	**Clippard** (2–1)	McGee (9)	34,890	17–19
37	May 12	Giants	2–4	Cueto (5–1)	**Greinke** (3–3)	López (1)	19,461	17–20
38	May 13	Giants	1–3	Samardzija (5–2)	**Miller** (1–4)	Casilla (8)	21,753	17–21
39	May 14	Giants	3–5	Strickland (1–0)	**Hudson** (1–1)	Gearrin (1)	32,448	17–22
40	May 15	Giants	1–2	Strickland (2–0)	**Ziegler** (1–2)	Casilla (9)	25,007	17–23
41	May 16	Yankees	12–2	**Ray** (2–2)	Green (0–1)	—	32,718	18–23
42	May 17	Yankees	5–3	**Greinke** (4–3)	Pineda (1–5)	**Ziegler** (8)	30,913	19–23
43	May 18	Yankees	2–4	Eovaldi (4–2)	**Miller** (1–5)	Chapman (4)	32,191	19–24
44	May 20	@ Cardinals	11–7	**Corbin** (2–3)	Martínez (4–4)	**Barrett** (1)	43,301	20–24
45	May 21	@ Cardinals	2–6	Leake (3–3)	**Ray** (2–3)	—	45,117	20–25
46	May 22	@ Cardinals	7–2	**Greinke** (5–3)	García (3–4)	—	43,829	21–25
47	May 24	@ Pirates	1–12	Liriano (4–3)	**Miller** (1–6)	—	18,415	21–26
48	May 25	@ Pirates	4–5	Locke (3–3)	**De La Rosa** (4–5)	Melancon (16)	20,696	21–27
49	May 26	@ Pirates	3–8	Schugel (1–1)	**Corbin** (2–4)	—	30,861	21–28
50	May 27	Padres	3–10	Friedrich (1–1)	**Ray** (2–4)	—	24,935	21–29
51	May 28	Padres	8–7	**Greinke** (6–3)	Vargas (0–3)	—	23,927	22–29
52	May 29	Padres	6–3	**Bradley** (2–0)	Pomeranz (4–5)	**Ziegler** (9)	21,458	23–29
53	May 30	Astros	3–8	McHugh (5–4)	**Escobar** (0–1)	—	24,798	23–30
54	May 31	Astros	5–8	McCullers (2–1)	**Corbin** (2–5)	Gregerson (13)	15,556	23–31

June: 13–14 (Home: 4–8; Away: 9–6)

#	Date	Opponent	Score	Win	Loss	Save	Attendance	Record
55	June 1	@ Astros	4–5 (11)	Feliz (4–1)	**Clippard** (2–2)	—	22,642	23–32
56	June 2	@ Astros	3–0	**Greinke** (7–3)	Keuchel (3–7)	**Ziegler** (10)	21,764	24–32
57	June 3	@ Cubs	0–6	Lackey (6–2)	**Bradley** (2–1)	—	38,813	24–33
58	June 4	@ Cubs	3–5	Hammel (7–1)	**Escobar** (0–2)	Rondón (10)	40,415	24–34
59	June 5	@ Cubs	3–2	**Corbin** (3–5)	Arrieta (9–1)	**Ziegler** (11)	41,596	25–34
60	June 6	Rays	4–6	Archer (4–7)	**Ray** (2–5)	Colomé (16)	17,176	25–35
61	June 7	Rays	5–0	**Greinke** (8–3)	Moore (2–4)	—	17,964	26–35
62	June 8	Rays	3–6	Odorizzi (3–3)	**Bradley** (2–2)	Colomé (17)	16,954	26–36
63	June 10	Marlins	6–8	Ellington (1–0)	**Clippard** (2–3)	Ramos (19)	26,970	26–37
64	June 11	Marlins	5–3	**Godley** (1–0)	Fernández (9–3)	**Ziegler** (12)	33,442	27–37
65	June 12	Marlins	6–0	**Ray** (3–5)	Conley (3–4)	—	27,741	28–37
66	June 13	Dodgers	3–2	**Greinke** (9–3)	Bolsinger (1–4)	**Ziegler** (13)	21,374	29–37
67	June 14	Dodgers	4–7	Maeda (6–4)	**Bradley** (2–3)	Jansen (18)	23,458	29–38
68	June 15	Dodgers	2–3	Kershaw (10–1)	**Corbin** (3–6)	Jansen (19)	27,792	29–39
69	June 17	@ Phillies	10–2	**Ray** (4–5)	Morgan (1–6)	—	19,282	30–39
70	June 18	@ Phillies	4–1	**Greinke** (10–3)	Eickhoff (4–9)	**Ziegler** (14)	33,797	31–39
71	June 19	@ Phillies	5–1	**Bradley** (3–3)	Eflin (0–2)	—	40,214	32–39
72	June 20	@ Phillies	3–1	**Miller** (2–6)	Hellickson (4–6)	**Ziegler** (15)	22,118	33–39
73	June 21	@ Blue Jays	4–2	**Corbin** (4–6)	Estrada (5–3)	**Hudson** (1)	41,838	34–39
74	June 22	@ Blue Jays	2–5	Happ (9–3)	**Ray** (4–6)	Osuna (14)	46,967	34–40
75	June 23	@ Rockies	7–6	**Ziegler** (2–2)	Estévez (1–4)	—	36,558	35–40
76	June 24	@ Rockies	10–9	**Collmenter** (1–0)	Estévez (1–5)	**Ziegler** (16)	35,216	36–40
77	June 25	@ Rockies	6–11	De La Rosa (5–4)	**Miller** (2–7)	Germen (1)	33,337	36–41
78	June 26	@ Rockies	7–9	Estévez (2–5)	**Bracho** (0–1)	—	32,435	36–42
79	June 27	Phillies	0–8	Velasquez (6–2)	**Ray** (4–7)	—	22,567	36–43
80	June 28	Phillies	3–4	Neris (2–3)	**Ziegler** (2–3)	Gómez (21)	19,645	36–44
81	June 29	Phillies	8–9 (10)	Gómez (3–2)	**Bracho** (0–2)	Oberholtzer (1)	18,603	36–45

July: 7–17 (Home: 4–7; Away: 3–10)

#	Date	Opponent	Score	Win	Loss	Save	Attendance	Record
82	July 1	Giants	4–6	Cueto (12–1)	**Miller** (2–8)	Casilla (18)	24,859	36–46
83	July 2	Giants	6–5	**Barrett** (1–0)	Strickland (3–1)	**Ziegler** (17)	30,683	37–46
84	July 3	Giants	4–5 (11)	Osich (1–1)	**Burgos** (0–1)	Casilla (19)	26,171	37–47
85	July 4	Padres	4–8	Perdomo (3–3)	**Bradley** (3–4)	—	39,203	37–48
86	July 5	Padres	7–5	**Godley** (2–0)	Friedrich (4–4)	**Ziegler** (18)	14,110	38–48
87	July 6	Padres	6–13	Dominguez (1–0)	**Miller** (2–9)	—	17,091	38–49
88	July 8	@ Giants	2–6	Samardzija (9–5)	**Corbin** (4–7)	—	41,576	38–50
89	July 9	@ Giants	2–4	Kontos (2–1)	**Ray** (4–8)	Casilla (21)	41,571	38–51
90	July 10	@ Giants	0–4	Bumgarner (10–4)	**Bradley** (3–5)	—	42,075	38–52
**87th All-Star Game in San Diego, California**
91	July 15	Dodgers	7–13	Norris (5–7)	**Corbin** (4–8)	—	30,639	38–53
92	July 16	Dodgers	2–1 (12)	**Delgado** (2–1)	Fien (1–1)	—	38,899	39–53
93	July 17	Dodgers	6–5	**Ray** (5–8)	Maeda (8–7)	**Barrett** (2)	29,459	40–53
94	July 19	Blue Jays	1–5	Sanchez (10–1)	**Godley** (2–1)	—	26,626	40–54
95	July 20	Blue Jays	4–10	Stroman (8–4)	**Corbin** (4–9)	—	20,076	40–55
96	July 22	@ Reds	2–6	Straily (5–6)	**Bradley** (3–6)	—	24,252	40–56
97	July 23	@ Reds	1–6	Lorenzen (1–0)	**Ray** (5–9)	—	23,963	40–57
98	July 24	@ Reds	9–8	**Godley** (3–1)	Finnegan (5–8)	—	25,304	41–57
99	July 25	@ Brewers	2–7	Anderson (5–10)	**Shipley** (0–1)	—	25,347	41–58
100	July 26	@ Brewers	4–9	Thornburg (4–4)	**Hudson** (1–2)	—	24,074	41–59
101	July 27	@ Brewers	8–1	**Bradley** (4–6)	Nelson (6–9)	—	22,581	42–59
102	July 28	@ Brewers	4–6	Davies (8–4)	**Ray** (5–10)	Jeffress (24)	33,971	42–60
103	July 29	@ Dodgers	7–9	Baez (3–2)	**Curtis** (0–1)	Jansen (31)	50,966	42–61
104	July 30	@ Dodgers	4–2	**Shipley** (1–1)	Kazmir (9–4)	**Barrett** (3)	49,540	43–61
105	July 31	@ Dodgers	3–14	Coleman (2–1)	**Corbin** (4–10)	—	42,380	43–62

August: 13–15 (Home: 7–9; Away: 5–7)

#	Date	Opponent	Score	Win	Loss	Save	Attendance	Record
106	August 1	Nationals	1–14	Strasburg (15–1)	**Bradley** (4–7)	—	17,518	43–63
107	August 2	Nationals	4–10	Roark (11–6)	**Ray** (5–11)	—	19,919	43–64
108	August 3	Nationals	3–8	Scherzer (12–6)	**Godley** (3–2)	—	17,086	43–65
109	August 5	Brewers	3–2 (11)	**Loewen** (1–0)	Boyer (1–2)	—	20,008	44–65
110	August 6	Brewers	6–15	Garza (3–4)	**Corbin** (4–11)	—	29,370	44–66
111	August 7	Brewers	9–3	**Hudson** (2–2)	Nelson (6–11)	—	24,021	45–66
112	August 9	@ Mets	5–3	**Greinke** (11–3)	Robles (5–4)	**Barrett** (4)	31,884	46–66
113	August 10	@ Mets	3–2 (12)	**Delgado** (3–1)	Blevins (4–2)	—	31,277	47–66
114	August 11	@ Mets	9–0	**Shipley** (2–1)	Syndergaard (9–7)	—	39,271	48–66
115	August 12	@ Red Sox	4–9	Price (10–8)	**Corbin** (4–12)	—	37,555	48–67
116	August 13	@ Red Sox	3–6	Ross Jr. (2–2)	**Bradley** (4–8)	Kimbrel (19)	37,653	48–68
117	August 14	@ Red Sox	2–16	Porcello (16–3)	**Greinke** (11–4)	—	36,842	48–69
118	August 15	Mets	10–6	**Ray** (6–11)	Colón (10–7)	—	17,340	49-69
119	August 16	Mets	5–7	Syndergaard (10–7)	**Shipley** (2–2)	Familia (40)	20,790	49–70
120	August 17	Mets	13–5	**Godley** (4–2)	Niese (8–7)	—	18,469	50–70
121	August 18	@ Padres	8–9	Buchter (3–0)	**Barrett** (1–1)	Maurer (66)	20,790	50–71
122	August 19	@ Padres	4–7 (10)	Quackenbush (7–4)	**Corbin** (4–13)	–	26,080	50–72
123	August 20	@ Padres	2–1	**Ray** (7–11)	Richard (0–3)	**Burgos** (1)	17,340	51–72
124	August 21	@ Padres	1–9	Perdomo (6–7)	**Shipley** (2–3)	–	28,150	51–73
125	August 22	Braves	9–8	**Burgos** (1–1)	Gant (1–3)	–	15,789	52–73
126	August 23	Braves	4–7	Ramírez (2–0)	**Barrett** (1–2)	Johnson (11)	18,780	52–74
127	August 24	Braves	10–9 (11)	**Corbin** (5–13)	Ramírez (2–1)	–	15,376	53–74
128	August 25	Braves	2–3	Wisler (5–11)	**Ray** (7–12)	Johnson (12)	18,698	53–75
129	August 26	Reds	4–3 (11)	**Escobar** (1–2)	Wood (5–3)	–	26,087	54–75
130	August 27	Reds	0–13	DeSclafani (8–2)	**Godley** (4–3)	–	34,395	54–76
131	August 28	Reds	11–2	**Bradley** (5–8)	Bailey (2–3)	–	22,624	55–76
132	August 30	@ Giants	4–3	**Greinke** (12–4)	Cueto (14–5)	**Hudson** (2)	41,443	56–76
133	August 31	@ Giants	2–4	Moore (9–10)	**Miller** (2–10)	Casilla (29)	41,447	56–77

September: 11–16 (Home: 5–5; Away: 6–11)

#	Date	Opponent	Score	Win	Loss	Save	Attendance	Record
134	September 2	@ Rockies	7–14	Estévez (3–7)	**Burgos** (1–2)	–	23,002	56–78
135	September 3	@ Rockies	9–4	**Shipley** (3–3)	Chatwood (10–9)	–	30,280	57–78
136	September 4	@ Rockies	8–5	**Bradley** (6–8)	Gray (9–7)	–	31,981	58–78
137	September 5	@ Dodgers	2–10	Maeda (14–8)	**Greinke** (12–5)	—	41,820	58–79
138	September 6	@ Dodgers	2–5	Stripling (4–6)	**Miller** (2–11)	Jansen (42)	42,457	58–80
139	September 7	@ Dodgers	1–3	Stewart (1–2)	**Ray** (7–13)	Jansen (43)	44,352	58–81
140	September 9	Giants	6–7 (12)	Nathan (2–0)	**Leone** (0–1)	Gearrin (3)	26,492	58–82
141	September 10	Giants	3–11	Cueto (15–5)	**Bradley** (6–9)	—	32,301	58–83
142	September 11	Giants	3–5	Moore (3–4)	**Greinke** (12–6)	Strickland (3)	26,008	58–84
143	September 12	Rockies	12–9	**Delgado** (4–1)	Lyles (4–5)	**Hudson** (3)	20,637	59–84
144	September 13	Rockies	11–4	**Ray** (8–13)	De La Rosa (8–8)	**Koch** (1)	20,897	60–84
145	September 14	Rockies	11–6	**Shipley** (4–3)	Hoffman (0–4)	—	19,801	61–84
146	September 15	Dodgers	7–3	**Bradley** (7–9)	Hill (12–4)	Corbin (1)	27,126	62–84
147	September 16	Dodgers	2–3	Maeda (15–9)	**Greinke** (12–7)	Jansen (45)	28,211	62–85
148	September 17	Dodgers	2–6	Stewart (2–2)	**Miller** (2–12)	—	38,255	62–86
149	September 18	Dodgers	10–9 (12)	**Koch** (1–0)	Stripling (4–8)	—	26,159	63–86
150	September 19	@ Padres	2–3	Richard (3−3)	**Shipley** (4−4)	Maurer (11)	20,250	63–87
151	September 20	@ Padres	2–5	Hessler (1–0)	**Godley** (4−4)	Maurer (12)	34,319	63–88
152	September 21	@ Padres	3–2	**Greinke** (4−4)	Perdomo (8–10)	**Hudson** (4)	22,110	64–88
153	September 23	@ Orioles	2–3 (12)	Drake (1–0)	**Koch** (1–1)	—	37,815	64–89
154	September 24	@ Orioles	1–6	Miley (9–13)	**Ray** (8–14)	—	40,610	64–90
155	September 25	@ Orioles	1–2	Bundy (10–6)	**Shipley** (4–5)	Britton (46)	31,229	64–91
156	September 26	@ Nationals	14–4	**Godley** (5–4)	Roark (15–10)	—	18,707	65–91
157	September 27	@ Nationals	2–4	Scherzer (19–7)	**Delgado** (4–2)	Melancon (44)	24,297	65–92
158	September 28	@ Nationals	3–0 (6)	**Miller** (3–12)	Gonzalez (11–11)	—	20,577	66–92
159	September 29	@ Nationals	3–5	López (5–3)	**Ray** (8–15)	Melancon (45)	21,618	66–93
160	September 30	Padres	5–3	**Delgado** (5–2)	Jackson (5–7)	**Hudson** (5)	42,651	67–93

October: 2–0 (Home: 2–0; Away: 0–0)

#	Date	Opponent	Score	Win	Loss	Save	Attendance	Record
161	October 1	Padres	9–5	**Bradley** (8–9)	Richard (3–4)	—	32,811	68–93
162	October 2	Padres	3–2	**Hudson** (3–2)	Hand (4–4)	—	31,385	69–93

Legend: = Win = Loss = Postponement
Bold = Diamondbacks team member

== Roster ==
2016 Arizona Diamondbacks
Roster
Pitchers: 33 Jake Barrett; 61 Silvino Bracho; 25 Archie Bradley; 36 Enrique Burgos; 45 Matt Buschmann; 59 Vicente Campos; 40 Andrew Chafin; 19 Tyler Clippard; 55 Josh Collmenter; 46 Patrick Corbin; 62 Zac Curtis; 12 Rubby De La Rosa; 48 Randall Delgado; 31 Kyle Drabek; 43 Edwin Escobar; 52 Zack Godley; 21 Zack Greinke; 56 Steve Hathaway; 56 Keith Hessler; 41 Daniel Hudson; 55 Matt Koch; 54 Dominic Leone; 58 Adam Loewen; 50 Evan Marshall; 26 Shelby Miller; 38 Robbie Ray; 35 Braden Shipley; 34 Tyler Wagner; 29 Brad Ziegler	Catchers: 7 Welington Castillo; 8 Tuffy Gosewisch; 28 Oscar Hernández; 10 Chris Herrmann; Infielders: 13 Nick Ahmed; 44 Paul Goldschmidt; 15 Phil Gosselin; 22 Jake Lamb; 16 Chris Owings; 2 Jean Segura	Outfielders: 1 Michael Bourn; 30 Socrates Brito; 27 Brandon Drury; 4 Mike Freeman; 19 Mitch Haniger; 29 Kyle Jensen; 14 Peter O'Brien; 6 David Peralta; 11 A. J. Pollock; 24 Yasmany Tomas; 5 Rickie Weeks	Manager: 3 Chip Hale; Coaches: 47 Garvin Alston (bullpen); 23 Mike Butcher (pitching); 39 Mike Fetters (quality assurance); 17 Mark Grace (assistant hitting); 18 Dave Magadan (hitting); 39 Dave McKay (first base); 49 Ariel Prieto (assistant coach); 83 Mark Reed (bullpen catcher); 53 Glenn Sherlock (bench); 9 Matt Williams (third base)

== Player stats ==
=== Batting ===
Note: G = Games played; AB = At bats; R = Runs; H = Hits; 2B = Doubles; 3B = Triples; HR = Home runs; RBI = Runs batted in; SB = Stolen bases; BB = Walks; AVG = Batting average; SLG = Slugging average

Player	G	AB	R	H	2B	3B	HR	RBI	SB	BB	AVG	SLG
Jean Segura	153	637	102	203	41	7	20	64	33	39	.319	.499
Paul Goldschmidt	158	579	106	172	33	3	24	95	32	110	.297	.489
Yasmany Tomás	140	530	72	144	30	1	31	83	2	31	.272	.508
Jake Lamb	151	523	81	130	31	9	29	91	6	64	.249	.509
Brandon Drury	134	461	59	130	31	1	16	53	1	31	.282	.458
Chris Owings	119	437	52	121	24	11	5	49	21	20	.277	.416
Welington Castillo	113	416	41	110	24	0	14	68	2	33	.264	.423
Michael Bourn	89	329	43	86	12	6	3	30	13	22	.261	.362
Nick Ahmed	90	284	26	62	9	1	4	20	5	15	.218	.299
Phil Gosselin	122	220	26	61	12	1	2	13	3	15	.277	.368
Rickie Weeks	108	180	29	43	9	1	9	27	5	20	.239	.450
David Peralta	48	171	23	43	9	5	4	15	2	8	.251	.433
Chris Herrmann	56	148	21	42	5	4	6	28	4	16	.284	.493
Mitch Haniger	34	109	9	25	2	1	5	17	0	12	.229	.404
Socrates Brito	40	95	10	17	3	1	4	12	2	2	.179	.358
Tuffy Gosewisch	33	90	8	14	1	1	3	7	0	7	.156	.289
Peter O'Brien	28	64	6	9	1	0	5	9	0	3	.141	.391
A.J. Pollock	12	41	9	10	0	0	2	4	4	5	.244	.390
Kyle Jensen	17	31	5	6	0	1	2	7	0	2	.194	.452
Oscar Hernández	4	11	1	2	0	0	1	1	0	0	.182	.455
Mike Freeman	8	9	0	0	0	0	0	0	0	2	.000	.000
Pitcher totals	162	300	23	49	8	2	1	16	2	6	.163	.213
Team totals	162	5665	752	1479	285	56	190	709	137	463	.261	.432

=== Pitching ===
Note: W = Wins; L = Losses; ERA = Earned run average; G = Games pitched; GS = Games started; SV = Saves; IP = Innings pitched; H = Hits allowed; R = Runs allowed; ER = Earned runs allowed; BB = Walks allowed; SO = Strikeouts

Player	W	L	ERA	G	GS	SV	IP	H	R	ER	BB	SO
Robbie Ray	8	15	4.90	32	32	0	174.1	185	105	95	71	218
Zack Greinke	13	7	4.37	26	26	0	158.2	161	80	77	41	134
Patrick Corbin	5	13	5.15	36	24	1	155.2	177	109	89	66	131
Archie Bradley	8	9	5.02	26	26	0	141.2	154	84	79	67	143
Shelby Miller	3	12	6.15	20	20	0	101.0	127	72	69	42	70
Randall Delgado	5	2	4.44	79	0	0	75.0	77	39	37	36	68
Zack Godley	5	4	6.39	27	9	0	74.2	86	54	53	25	60
Braden Shipley	4	5	5.27	13	11	0	70.0	80	43	41	28	43
Daniel Hudson	3	2	5.22	70	0	5	60.1	65	40	35	22	58
Jake Barrett	1	2	3.49	68	0	4	59.1	47	25	23	28	56
Rubby De La Rosa	4	5	4.26	13	10	0	50.2	43	26	24	20	54
Enrique Burgos	1	2	5.66	43	0	1	41.1	38	27	26	23	43
Brad Ziegler	2	3	2.82	36	0	18	38.1	41	13	12	15	27
Tyler Clippard	2	3	4.30	40	0	1	37.2	34	18	18	15	46
Dominic Leone	0	1	6.33	25	0	0	27.0	45	21	19	12	23
Silvino Bracho	0	2	7.30	26	0	0	24.2	31	22	20	10	17
Edwin Escobar	1	2	7.23	25	2	0	23.2	33	21	19	12	17
Andrew Chafin	0	1	6.75	32	0	0	22.2	22	18	17	11	28
Josh Collmenter	1	0	4.84	15	0	0	22.1	21	12	12	11	17
Matt Koch	1	1	2.00	7	2	1	18.0	9	4	4	4	10
Evan Marshall	0	1	8.80	15	0	0	15.1	28	18	15	8	9
Steve Hathaway	0	0	4.91	24	0	0	14.2	18	8	8	6	15
Zac Curtis	0	1	6.75	21	0	0	13.1	13	10	10	13	10
Tyler Wagner	1	0	1.80	3	0	0	10.0	9	3	2	2	7
Adam Loewen	1	0	15.00	8	0	0	6.0	7	10	10	6	3
Vicente Campos	0	0	3.18	1	0	0	5.2	4	3	2	2	4
Matt Buschmann	0	0	2.08	3	0	0	4.1	2	1	1	1	3
Keith Hessler	0	0	9.00	2	0	0	3.0	5	3	3	2	2
Kyle Drabek	0	0	4.50	1	0	0	2.0	1	1	1	4	2
Team totals	69	93	5.09	162	162	31	1451.1	1563	890	821	603	1318

== Farm system ==
Level	Team	League	Manager
AAA	Reno Aces	Pacific Coast League	Phil Nevin
AA	Mobile BayBears	Southern League	Robby Hammock
A-Advanced	Visalia Rawhide	California League	J. R. House
A	Kane County Cougars	Midwest League	Mike Benjamin
A-Short Season	Hillsboro Hops	Northwest League	Shelley Duncan
Rookie	Missoula Osprey	Pioneer League	Joe Mather
Rookie	AZL Diamondbacks	Arizona League	Darrin Garner
Rookie	DSL Diamondbacks	Dominican Summer League	
