= Keith Hessler =

American baseball player (born 1989)

- Pitcher
- Born: March 15, 1989 (age 37); Silver Spring, Maryland, U.S.
- Batted: Left Threw: Left

MLB debut
- August 8, 2015, for the Arizona Diamondbacks

Last MLB appearance
- September 30, 2016, for the San Diego Padres

MLB statistics
- Win–loss record: 1–1
- Earned run average: 5.56
- Strikeouts: 23
- Stats at Baseball Reference

Teams
- Arizona Diamondbacks (2015–2016); San Diego Padres (2016)

Keith Alexander Hessler (born March 15, 1989) is an American former professional baseball pitcher. He played in Major League Baseball (MLB) for the Arizona Diamondbacks and San Diego Padres.

== Career ==
=== Arizona Diamondbacks ===
Hessler played college baseball at Coastal Carolina University. He was drafted by the Arizona Diamondbacks in the 28th round of the 2010 Major League Baseball draft.

On August 8, 2015, Hessler was selected to the 40-man roster and promoted to the major leagues for the first time. In 18 appearances for Arizona, he struggled to an 8.03 ERA with 12 strikeouts across 12 1/3 innings pitched.

Hessler began the 2016 campaign with Double–A Mobile. In 2 games for the Diamondbacks, he allowed 3 runs on 5 hits with 2 strikeouts over 3 innings pitched. Hessler was designated for assignment following the promotion of Zac Curtis on April 30, 2016.

=== San Diego Padres ===
On May 10, 2016, Hessler was claimed off waivers by the San Diego Padres. In 15 games for San Diego, he recorded a 3.38 ERA with 9 strikeouts across 18 2/3 innings pitched.

On April 1, 2017, Hessler was designated for assignment by the Padres. He cleared waivers and was sent outright to the Triple–A El Paso Chihuahuas on April 5. In 41 relief outings for the Chihuahuas, Hessler compiled a 2–2 record and 4.57 ERA with 36 strikeouts over 45 1/3 innings pitched. He was released by the Padres organization on August 3.

=== Somerset Patriots ===
On August 11, 2017, Hessler signed with the Somerset Patriots of the Atlantic League of Professional Baseball. In 13 games for the Patriots, Hessler recorded a 4.05 ERA with 13 strikeouts across 13 1/3 innings.

=== Colorado Rockies ===
On January 9, 2018, Hessler signed a minor league contract with the Colorado Rockies. He made 42 appearances out of the bullpen for the Triple–A Albuquerque Isotopes, compiling a 5.47 ERA with 57 strikeouts across 52 2/3 innings pitched. Hessler elected free agency following the season on November 2.
