= Ketel Marte =

Dominican baseball player (born 1993)

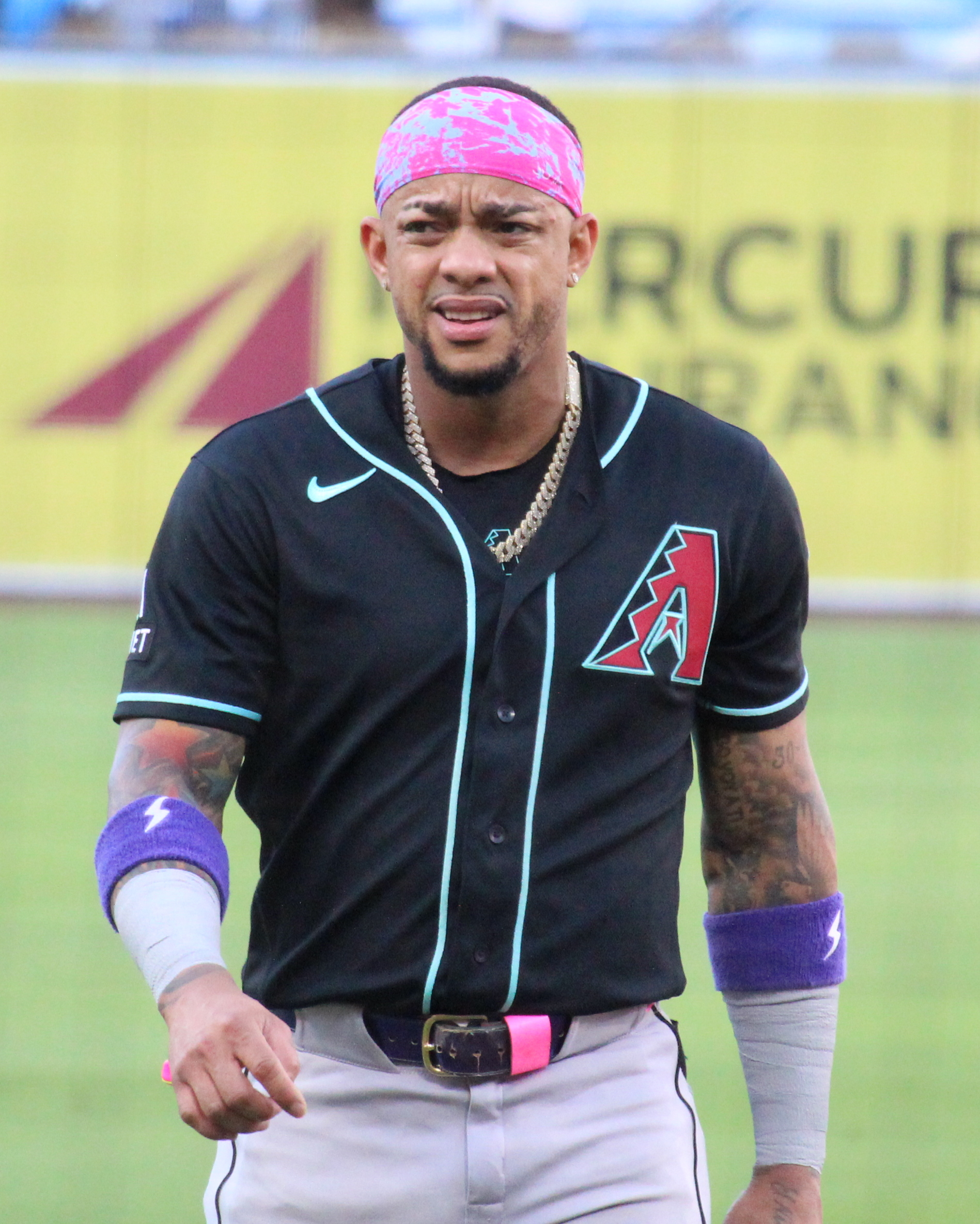
- Marte with the Arizona Diamondbacks in 2026

Arizona Diamondbacks – No. 4
- Second baseman
- Born: October 12, 1993 (age 33); Nizao, Dominican Republic
- Bats: Switch Throws: Right

MLB debut
- July 31, 2015, for the Seattle Mariners

MLB statistics (through 2026 season)
- Batting average: .277
- Home runs: 193
- Runs batted in: 663
- Stats at Baseball Reference

Teams
- Seattle Mariners (2015–2016); Arizona Diamondbacks (2017–present)

Career highlights and awards
- 3× All Star (2019, 2024, 2025); 2× All-MLB First Team (2024, 2025); NLCS MVP (2023); 2× Silver Slugger Award (2024, 2025)
Medals
Men's baseball
Representing Dominican Republic
World Baseball Classic
Bronze medal – third place	2026 Miami	Team

Ketel Ricardo Marte Valdez (Spanish: [keˈtel maɾˈte] keh-TELL mar-TEH; born October 12, 1993) is a Dominican professional baseball second baseman for the Arizona Diamondbacks of Major League Baseball (MLB). He has previously played in MLB for the Seattle Mariners.

Marte made his MLB debut with the Mariners in 2015, and was traded to the Diamondbacks during the 2016–17 offseason. Marte has been named the starting second baseman for the 2019, 2024 and 2025 All-Star Games. In 2023, he won NLCS MVP en route to Arizona's first pennant since 2001.

== Professional career ==
=== Seattle Mariners ===
==== Minor leagues (2010–2014) ====
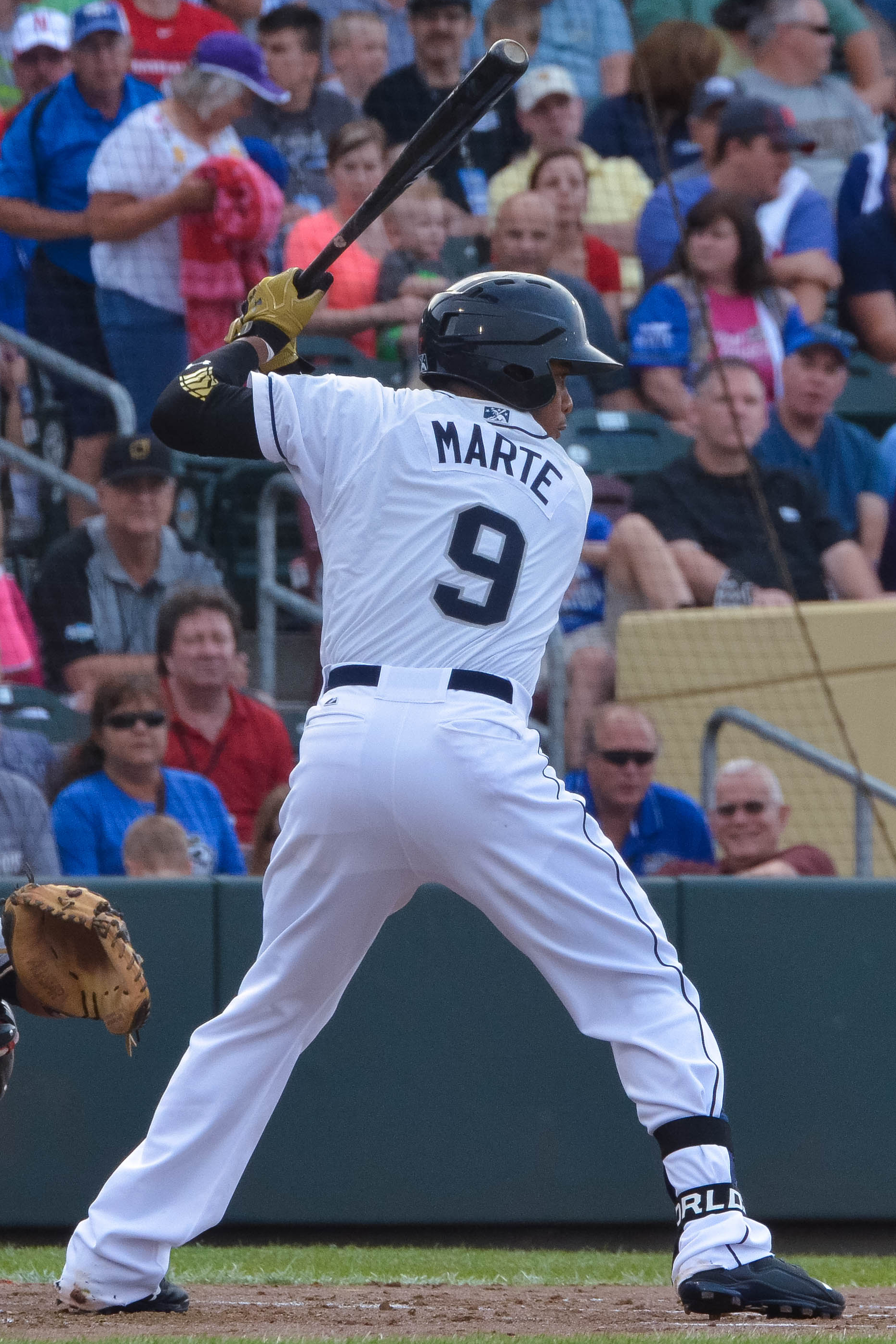
Marte batting during the 2015 Triple A All-Star Game

Marte signed with the Seattle Mariners as an international free agent on August 13, 2010, receiving a $100,000 signing bonus. He made his professional debut in 2011 for the Dominican Summer League Mariners. In 2012, he played with the Everett AquaSox of the Class A Short Season Northwest League and Clinton LumberKings of the Class A Midwest League. Marte spent the 2013 season with Clinton and the High Desert Mavericks of the Class A-Advanced California League. He batted .295 with a .687 on-base plus slugging (OPS). Marte started 2014 with the Jackson Generals of the Double-A Southern League and was promoted to the Tacoma Rainiers of the Triple-A Pacific Coast League (PCL). He finished the season hitting .304 with a .746 OPS and four home runs. On November 20, 2014, Ketel was added to Seattle's 40-man roster.

==== Major leagues (2015–2016) ====
The Mariners promoted Marte to the major leagues on July 31, 2015. Going into the 2016 season, Marte was named the team's starting shortstop following the trade of Brad Miller. However, Marte struggled in 2016, batting .259 with a .287 on-base percentage and striking out 84 times in 119 games while missing significant time due to a left thumb injury and mononucleosis that resulted in 3 separate stint on the disabled list. The Mariners attempted to trade Marte for the Cincinnati Reds' Zack Cozart during the season.

=== Arizona Diamondbacks (2017–present) ===
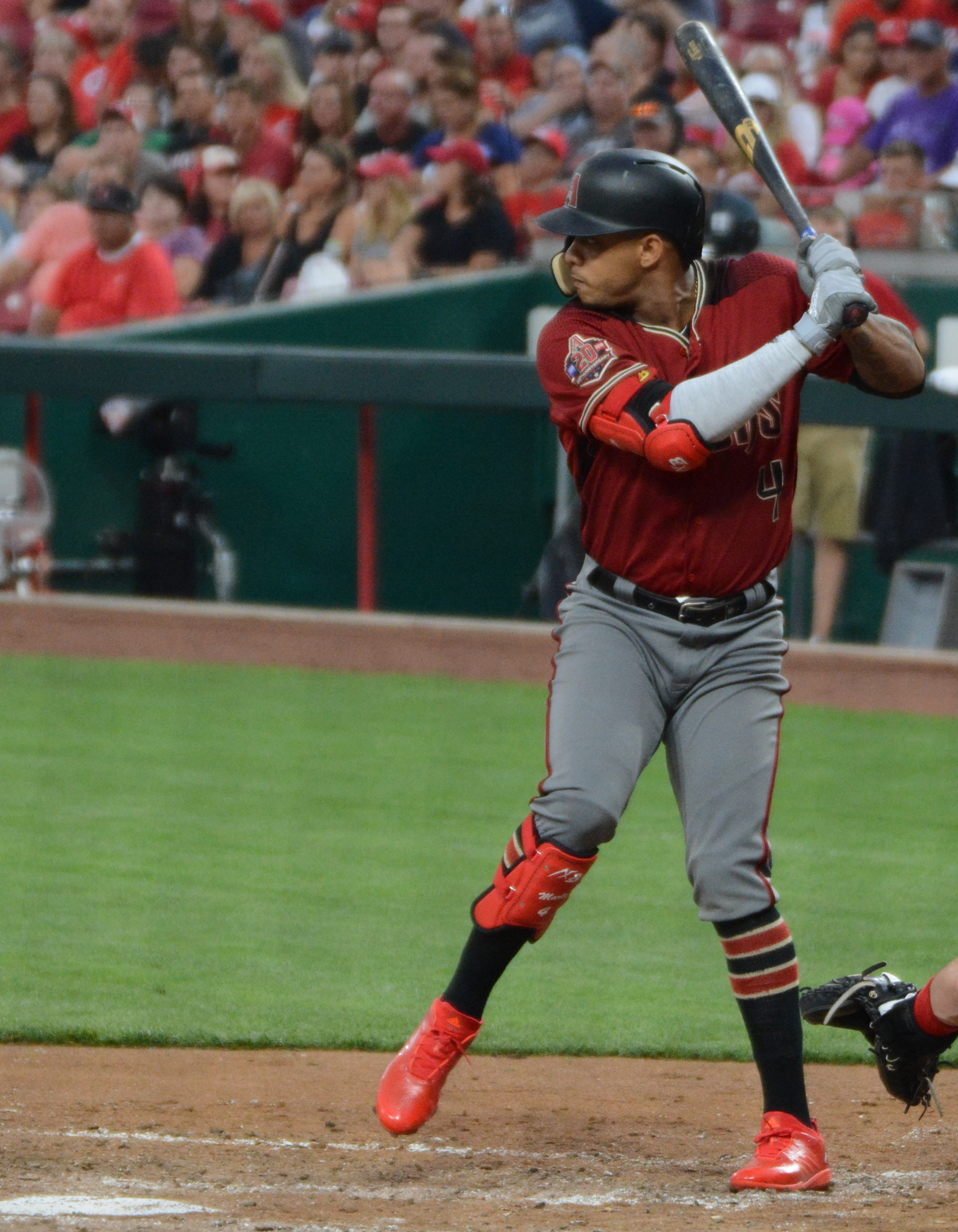
Marte in 2018

On November 23, 2016, the Mariners traded Marte and Taijuan Walker to the Arizona Diamondbacks in exchange for Jean Segura, Mitch Haniger, and Zac Curtis. Marte began the 2017 season with the Reno Aces of the PCL. The Diamondbacks promoted him to the majors on June 28. In the National League (NL) Wild Card Game, he hit two triples in an 11–8 win over the Colorado Rockies. He homered in Game 1 of the NL Division Series and batted .333 as the Los Angeles Dodgers swept the Diamondbacks. Marte was moved from shortstop to second base by the Diamondbacks ahead of the 2018 season to make room for shortstop Nick Ahmed in the Arizona infield. In 2018, Marte led all of MLB in triples with 12, batting .260 with 14 home runs in his first full season in Phoenix.

Batting .316 with 20 home runs and 51 RBIs in late June 2019, Marte was named the starting second baseman for the MLB All-Star Game. He finished the season batting .329 with 32 home runs and finished fourth in NL MVP voting. He played more games in center field than second base. In the shortened 2020 season, Marte hit .287 with 2 home runs and 17 RBI. On April 8, 2021, Marte was placed on the 10-day injured list with a right hamstring strain. He returned on May 19.

On March 29, 2022, Marte signed a five-year, $76 million contract extension with the Diamondbacks. He finished the 2022 season batting a career-low .240.

Marte rebounded in 2023, batting .276 with 25 home runs and a career-high 71 walks. In Game 3 of the 2023 NL Championship Series (NLCS), Marte hit a walk-off single for his third hit of the night as the Diamondbacks won 2–1. In Game 7, Marte extended his postseason hitting streak to 16 games, the longest hitting streak by any player to start his postseason career in MLB history. Marte finished the series batting .387 and was awarded the NLCS MVP Award. Marte extended his streak to 18 games in Game 2 of the World Series, setting the MLB record. Marte's streak ended in Game 5 of the series, the longest hit streak in postseason history at 20 games, passing Manny Ramirez, Derek Jeter, and Hank Bauer, who all had 17-game streaks. Marte was the last out of the World Series, striking out looking against Rangers reliever Josh Sborz to clinch the series for the Rangers.

Batting .292 with 19 home runs and 57 RBI at the 2024 All-Star Break, Marte was named the starting second baseman for the All-Star Game. On August 19, Marte was placed on the 10-day injured list with a left ankle sprain. He returned on September 6. He ended the 2024 season with batting .292 with a career-high 36 home runs and 95 RBI. Marte won his first Silver Slugger Award of his career. He finished third in NL MVP voting and was named to the All-MLB First Team.

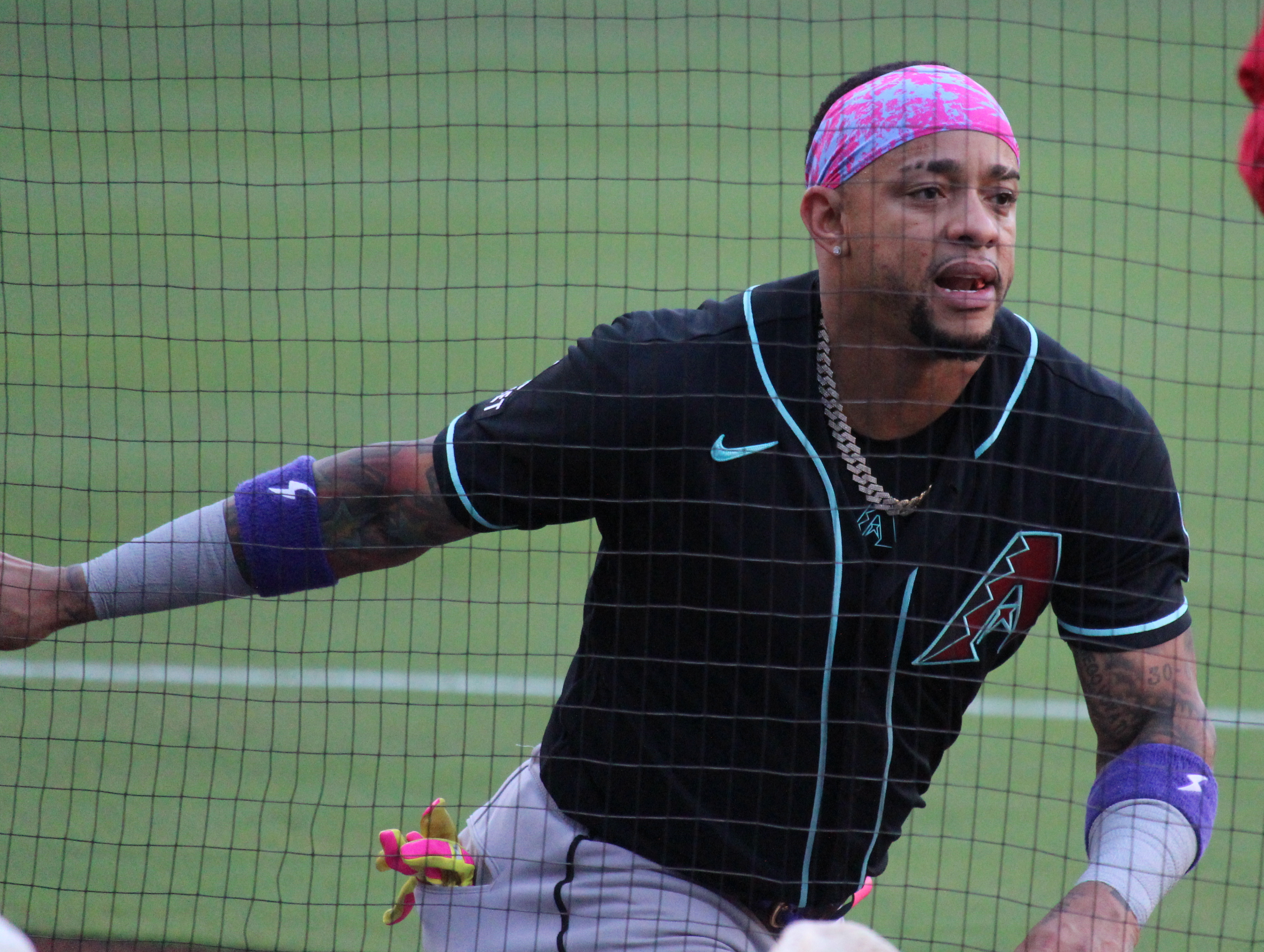
Marte in 2026

On April 2, 2025, the Diamondbacks signed Marte to a six-year contract extension worth a guaranteed $116.5 million. Three days later, Marte was placed on the 10-day injured list with a left hamstring strain. He returned on May 2. On June 2, Marte reached third place on the all-time career RBIs list as a Diamondback with 481. He surpassed Steve Finley’s 479 with his two-run homer in the third inning. He trailed Luis Gonzalez (774) and Paul Goldschmidt (710). In July, Marte was voted to start his third All-Star Game. The night of the All-Star Game, his home in Scottsdale, Arizona, was robbed; Marte said he lost $400,000 worth of items. Marte missed three games following the All-Star break, traveling to the Dominican Republic. His absence frustrated some of his teammates, according to a report in the Arizona Republic in August. Days after the report, Marte apologized for his absence. Marte finished the 2025 season batting .283 with 28 home runs in 126 games, his fewest since 2021. For the second consecutive year, the Diamondbacks were eliminated from the postseason in the final series of the season.

On August 17, 2026, the Diamondbacks placed Marte on the restricted list after failing to show up for a series against the Boston Red Sox. On August 21, Marte was reinstated from the restricted list and was placed on injured list due to knee inflammation.

== Personal life ==
Marte is the nephew of former MLB infielder Wilson Valdez and is married to a cousin of Vladimir Guerrero Jr. He has five children.

Marte's mother, Elpidia Valdez, died in a car accident in the Dominican Republic in 2017. The Diamondbacks placed Marte on the bereavement list following her death. In June 2025, a fan at Rate Field in Chicago heckled Marte regarding his mother, leading Marte to break down in tears. The Chicago White Sox and MLB announced the fan was banned from attending games indefinitely.

Marte is nicknamed "Pike," (PEE-keh) which in the Dominican Republic refers to someone with "swag".

== See also ==
- Arizona Diamondbacks award winners and league leaders
- List of Major League Baseball annual triples leaders
- List of Major League Baseball players from the Dominican Republic
