= Jake Barrett =

American baseball player (born 1991)

- Pitcher
- Born: July 22, 1991 (age 34); Upland, California, U.S.
- Batted: Right Threw: Right

MLB debut
- April 4, 2016, for the Arizona Diamondbacks

Last MLB appearance
- May 8, 2019, for the New York Yankees

MLB statistics
- Win–loss record: 2–4
- Earned run average: 4.45
- Strikeouts: 92
- Stats at Baseball Reference

Teams
- Arizona Diamondbacks (2016–2018); New York Yankees (2019)
Medals
Men's baseball
Representing United States
World Junior Baseball Championship
Silver medal – second place	2008 Edmonton	Team
WBSC Premier12
Silver medal – second place	2015 Tokyo	Team
Pan American Games
Silver medal – second place	2015 Toronto	Team

Jake Dalton Barrett (born July 22, 1991) is an American former professional baseball pitcher. He has previously played in Major League Baseball (MLB) for the Arizona Diamondbacks and New York Yankees. He played college baseball for Arizona State University.

== Amateur career ==
Barrett began playing baseball when he was 10 years old. He attended Desert Ridge High School in Mesa, Arizona, and played for the school's baseball team. As a junior, he was named All-State. After the season, he played for the United States national baseball team in the 2008 World Junior Baseball Championship. As a senior, Barrett led his team to the state championship, throwing as hard as 95 miles per hour (153 km/h).

The Toronto Blue Jays selected Barrett in the third round of the 2009 MLB draft, but he did not sign. He enrolled at Arizona State University, and played college baseball for the Arizona State Sun Devils baseball team. In 2010, he played collegiate summer baseball with the Brewster Whitecaps of the Cape Cod Baseball League.

== Professional career ==
=== Arizona Diamondbacks ===
The Arizona Diamondbacks chose Barrett in the third round of the 2012 MLB draft. He signed and played for the South Bend Silver Hawks of the Single–A Midwest League in 2012, and the Visalia Rawhide of the High–A California League and Mobile BayBears of the Double–A Southern League in 2013. After the 2013 season, the Diamondbacks assigned him to the Salt River Rafters of the Arizona Fall League (AFL), and he appeared in the AFL Fall Stars Game. He pitched for Mobile and the Reno Aces of the Triple–A Pacific Coast League in 2014, where he had a combined 3.09 earned run average. He pitched for Mobile and Reno again in 2015. On November 20, 2015, the Diamondbacks added Barrett to their 40-man roster to protect him from the Rule 5 draft.

Barrett was chosen for the United States national baseball team's roster for the 2015 Pan American Games.

He made his MLB debut with the Diamondbacks on April 4, 2016. In 68 games, Barrett posted an ERA of 3.49 with 4 saves. The following two seasons, Barrett has struggled with consistency and injury, being limited to 35 total appearances between 2017 and 2018.

Barrett was designated for assignment by the Diamondbacks on January 31, 2019, after the signing of Greg Holland was made official.

=== New York Yankees ===
On February 5, 2019, the Diamondbacks traded Barrett to the San Francisco Giants in exchange for cash considerations. He was then designated for assignment again on February 22. On March 1, Barrett was claimed off waivers by the Pittsburgh Pirates. Barrett was designated for assignment on March 28, after the contracts of J. B. Shuck, Melky Cabrera, and Francisco Liriano were selected.

On April 4, 2019, the New York Yankees claimed Barrett off of waivers. On May 4, he was recalled from the Triple–A Scranton/Wilkes-Barre Railriders to replace James Paxton. Barrett made 2 appearances for the Yankees, compiling a 14.73 ERA with 4 strikeouts across 3 2/3 innings pitched. Barrett was outrighted off the Yankees' roster on November 4 and subsequently elected free agency.

=== Acereros de Monclova ===
On April 9, 2020, Barrett signed with the Acereros de Monclova of the Mexican League. After the cancellation of the 2020 LMB season as a result of the COVID-19 pandemic, Barrett signed on to play for the Sugar Land Skeeters of the Constellation Energy League (a makeshift 4-team independent league created as a result of the pandemic) for the 2020 season.

Barrett made 2 scoreless appearances for Monclova in 2021, striking out 4 in 2 innings of work. He spent the entirety of the 2022 season recovering from injury and did not appear in a game for the team.

Barrett made 31 appearances for the Acereros in 2023, compiling a 3–3 record and 5.51 ERA with 30 strikeouts and 2 saves across 32 2/3 innings pitched. He did not appear in a game for Monclova in 2024 and spent the entire season on the reserve list. He also spent the entire 2025 season on the reserve list and did not appear in a game.
