= Silvino Bracho =

Venezuelan baseball player (born 1992)

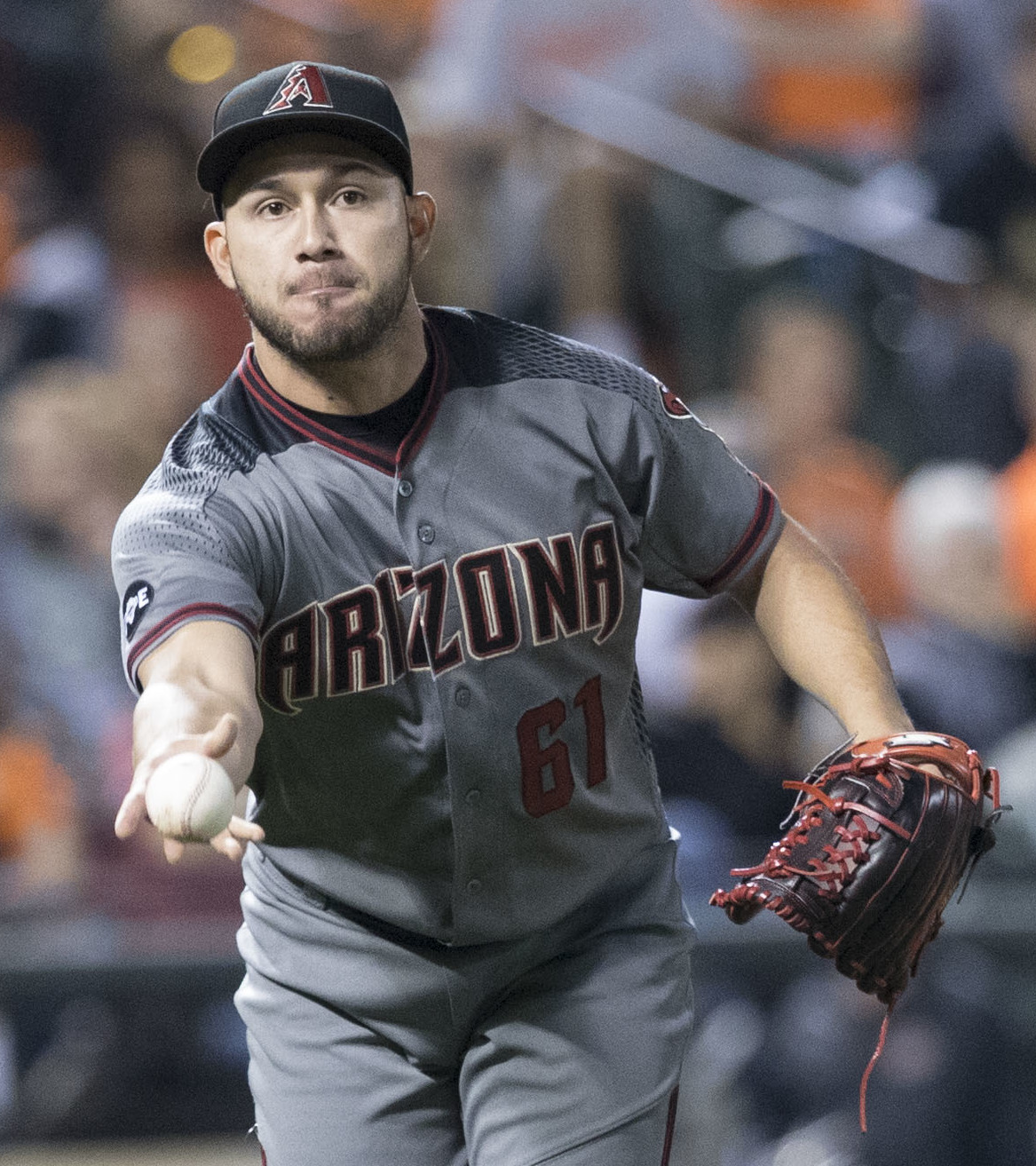
- Bracho with the Arizona Diamondbacks

Pericos de Puebla – No. 41
- Pitcher
- Born: July 17, 1992 (age 33); Maracaibo, Zulia, Venezuela
- Bats: Right Throws: Right

MLB debut
- August 30, 2015, for the Arizona Diamondbacks

MLB statistics (through 2023 season)
- Win–loss record: 2–2
- Earned run average: 4.80
- Strikeouts: 104
- Stats at Baseball Reference

Teams
- Arizona Diamondbacks (2015–2018, 2020); Atlanta Braves (2022); Cincinnati Reds (2023)

Silvino Bracho (born July 17, 1992) is a Venezuelan professional baseball pitcher for the Pericos de Puebla of the Mexican League. He has previously played in Major League Baseball (MLB) for the Arizona Diamondbacks, Atlanta Braves, and Cincinnati Reds. Bracho was signed by the Diamondbacks in 2011 as an amateur free agent. Listed at 5 feet 10 inches (1.78 m) and 190 pounds (86 kg), he throws and bats right-handed.

== Professional career ==
=== Arizona Diamondbacks ===
Bracho was signed by the Arizona Diamondbacks on August 9, 2011, as an amateur free agent. He began his professional career in 2012 with the Dominican Summer League Diamondbacks. He reached Single-A in 2014 with the South Bend Silver Hawks, where he compiled a 3–2 win–loss record with a league-leading 26 saves and a 2.08 earned run average (ERA), and was a Midwest League post-season All Star. He reached Double-A in 2015, with the Mobile BayBears.

Bracho was called up to the majors for the first time on August 30, 2015. He collected an ERA of 1.46 in 13 appearances during the 2015 season. He made the Opening Day roster at the start of the 2016 season, but after the game was optioned to Triple-A. He was recalled on April 20. For the season, he collected an ERA of 7.30 in 26 major-league appearances. In 2017, he spent the majority of the season in Triple-A, appearing only in 21 MLB games, in which he recorded a 5.66 ERA. In 2018, he posted an ERA of 3.19 in 31 MLB games.

In March 2019, Bracho suffered a torn UCL and underwent Tommy John surgery, missing the entire 2019 season as a result. In the shortened 2020 season, Bracho only pitched in one inning on the year in a game against the Colorado Rockies, surrendering a two-run home run to Ryan McMahon. On October 27, 2020, Bracho was outrighted off of the 40-man roster, and elected free agency.

=== San Francisco Giants ===
On November 11, 2020, Bracho signed a minor league contract with the San Francisco Giants organization. During the 2021 season, Bracho played exclusively for the Giants' Triple-A affiliate, the Sacramento River Cats.

=== Boston Red Sox ===
On March 6, 2022, Bracho signed a minor-league deal with the Boston Red Sox. He began the season in Triple-A with the Worcester Red Sox, until accompanying the major-league squad to Toronto for a series in late June. Bracho was added to Boston's active roster on June 28. He was designated for assignment two days later, without making an appearance for the team.

=== Atlanta Braves ===
On June 30, 2022, Bracho was traded to the Atlanta Braves for cash considerations. He was promoted to the active roster and made his debut with the team on July 1. He was designated for assignment on July 4 after just one appearance. The Braves outrighted Bracho to the Triple-A Gwinnett Stripers on July 6. On September 28, Bracho was again promoted to the active roster. On November 15, Bracho was designated for assignment by the Braves after they protected multiple prospects from the Rule 5 draft. On November 18, he was non–tendered and became a free agent.

=== Cincinnati Reds ===
On December 7, 2022, Bracho signed a minor league deal with the Cincinnati Reds that included an invite to spring training. He was assigned to the Triple-A Louisville Bats to begin the 2023 season, where he posted a 3.14 ERA with 15 strikeouts in 14 1/3 innings pitched. On May 14, 2023, Bracho's contract was selected to the active roster. He made 4 appearances for Cincinnati, allowing 3 runs on 2 hits and 5 walks with 4 strikeouts in 5 1/3 innings pitched. On May 24, Bracho was designated for assignment following the promotion of Eduardo Salazar. He cleared waivers and was sent outright to Triple-A on May 27.

On June 21, the Reds selected Bracho's contract back to the major league roster. After only one game (in which he tossed two scoreless innings against the Atlanta Braves), Bracho was designated for assignment on June 25 following the promotion of Randy Wynne. On October 10, Bracho elected free agency.

=== Toros de Tijuana ===
On January 25, 2024, Bracho signed with the Toros de Tijuana of the Mexican League. In 44 appearances for Tijuana, he logged a 1–1 record and 1.73 ERA with 54 strikeouts and 6 saves across 41 2/3 innings of relief. Bracho became a free agent following the season.

On July 28, 2025, Bracho re-signed with the Toros. In six appearances for the team, he posted an 0-1 record and 5.40 ERA with two strikeouts across five innings pitched.

=== Pericos de Puebla ===
On April 2, 2026, Bracho was traded to the Pericos de Puebla of the Mexican League.

== International career ==
Bracho has played for Águilas del Zulia of the Liga Venezolana de Béisbol Profesional (LVBP) during multiple winter seasons. He has also played for Venezuela in the 2017 World Baseball Classic, the 2021 Caribbean Series, and the 2022 Caribbean Series.

== See also ==
- List of Major League Baseball players from Venezuela
