= Mitch Haniger =

American baseball player (born 1990)

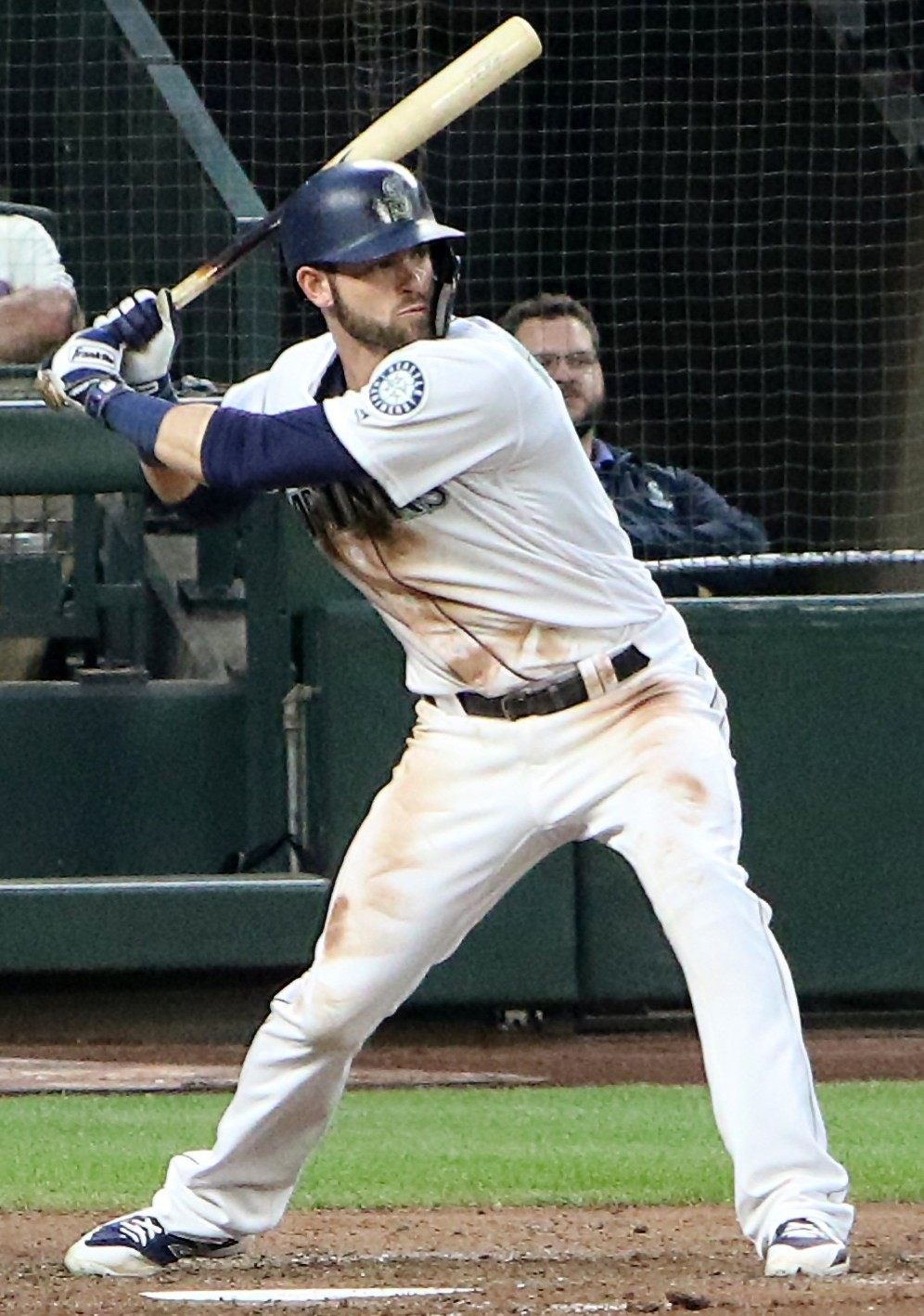
- Haniger with the Seattle Mariners in 2018

Free agent
- Outfielder
- Born: December 23, 1990 (age 35); Mountain View, California, U.S.
- Bats: Right Throws: Right

MLB debut
- August 16, 2016, for the Arizona Diamondbacks

MLB statistics (through 2024 season)
- Batting average: .250
- Home runs: 130
- Runs batted in: 395
- Stats at Baseball Reference

Teams
- Arizona Diamondbacks (2016); Seattle Mariners (2017–2019, 2021–2022); San Francisco Giants (2023); Seattle Mariners (2024)

Career highlights and awards
- All-Star (2018)

Mitchell Evan Haniger (born December 23, 1990) is an American professional baseball outfielder who is a free agent. He has previously played in Major League Baseball (MLB) for the Arizona Diamondbacks, Seattle Mariners, and San Francisco Giants.

After starring for the Cal Poly Mustangs, the Milwaukee Brewers selected Haniger in the supplemental section of the first round of the 2012 MLB draft. He was traded to the Diamondbacks in 2014, made his MLB debut with them in 2016, and was traded to the Mariners after the season. Haniger was an All Star in 2018. He signed a free agent contract with the Giants before the 2023 season but was traded back to the Mariners after one season with San Francisco. He was released by the Seattle Mariners on March 23, 2025.

== Amateur career ==
=== High school ===
Haniger attended Archbishop Mitty High School in San Jose, California, part of the West Catholic Athletic League. Haniger set records in baseball and football Archbishop Mitty. In baseball, he hit .364 as a senior with a school record 12 home runs. In football, he had 85 catches for 888 yards and 7 touchdowns as a wide receiver.

After high school, Haniger was ranked as the 72nd best prospect by Baseball America. The New York Mets selected Haniger in the 31st round of the 2009 Major League Baseball (MLB) Draft, but he did not sign with the team, choosing instead to enroll at Cal Poly San Luis Obispo to play for the Cal Poly Mustangs. He had been recruited by several other west coast Division I college baseball teams.

=== College ===
Haniger played right field as a freshman and sophomore at Cal Poly, then center field as a junior. He was named the 2010 Big West Conference Freshman of the Year following his debut season with the Mustangs, in which he batted .326.

Following his freshman season at Cal Poly, Haniger spent the summer of 2010 playing wood bat baseball as part of the Corvallis Knights of the West Coast League, hitting .299 over 134 at bats with the team, with 11 stolen bases in 38 games played. Haniger was named a member of the first-team All-WCL Team and was rated as the WCL's No. 5 pro prospect by Baseball America.

In his sophomore year at Cal Poly, Haniger batted .275/.371/.466 in 229 plate appearances. He once again played summer collegiate ball, this time with the Green Bay Bullfrogs of the Northwoods League.

In 2012, Haniger finished his junior season batting .346/.438/.626 in 259 plate appeances. He led the conference in slugging percentage and with 13 home runs, 64 RBI, and 7 sacrifice flies. He was in the top 10 in batting average and on-base percentage as well as with his 48 runs, 18 doubles, and 36 walks. Haniger won the Big West Conference Player of the Year award. He was named a second-team All-American by Collegiate Baseball and Baseball America.

== Professional career ==
=== Milwaukee Brewers ===
The Milwaukee Brewers selected Haniger as a supplemental draft pick at the end of the first round of the 2012 MLB draft with the 38th overall selection. The Brewers received that pick as compensation for the loss of free agent slugger Prince Fielder the previous offseason. Haniger's signing bonus with the Brewers was $1.2 million, slightly less than the $1.36 million bonus for his draft slot. Haniger debuted professionally that summer in 14 games for the Wisconsin Timber Rattlers of the Class A Midwest League. His season ended in early July after he suffered a partial tear of his posterior cruciate ligament in his right knee, which he injured on a play at the plate.

Haniger began the 2013 season rated as the Brewers' 10th-best prospect and best outfield arm by Baseball America. He returned to Wisconsin to start the season, before being promoted to the Brevard County Manatees of the Class A-Advanced Florida State League in late May. Combined, Haniger hit .264/.348/.431 with 11 home runs and 68 RBI. After the 2013 regular season, Haniger played for the Surprise Saguaros of the Arizona Fall League. He was named co-player of the week, along with Kris Bryant, in the first week of the fall league season. He batted .280/.354/.480 in 113 plate appearances, and was named to the AFL All-Prospect team.

The Brewers invited Haniger to spring training in 2014. Entering the season, he was rated the third-best prospect in the organization by Baseball America. Failing to make the team's 25-man roster, Haniger was assigned to the Huntsville Stars of the Double-A Southern League to begin the season. He missed more than a month of the season with wrist and hamstring injures.

=== Arizona Diamondbacks ===
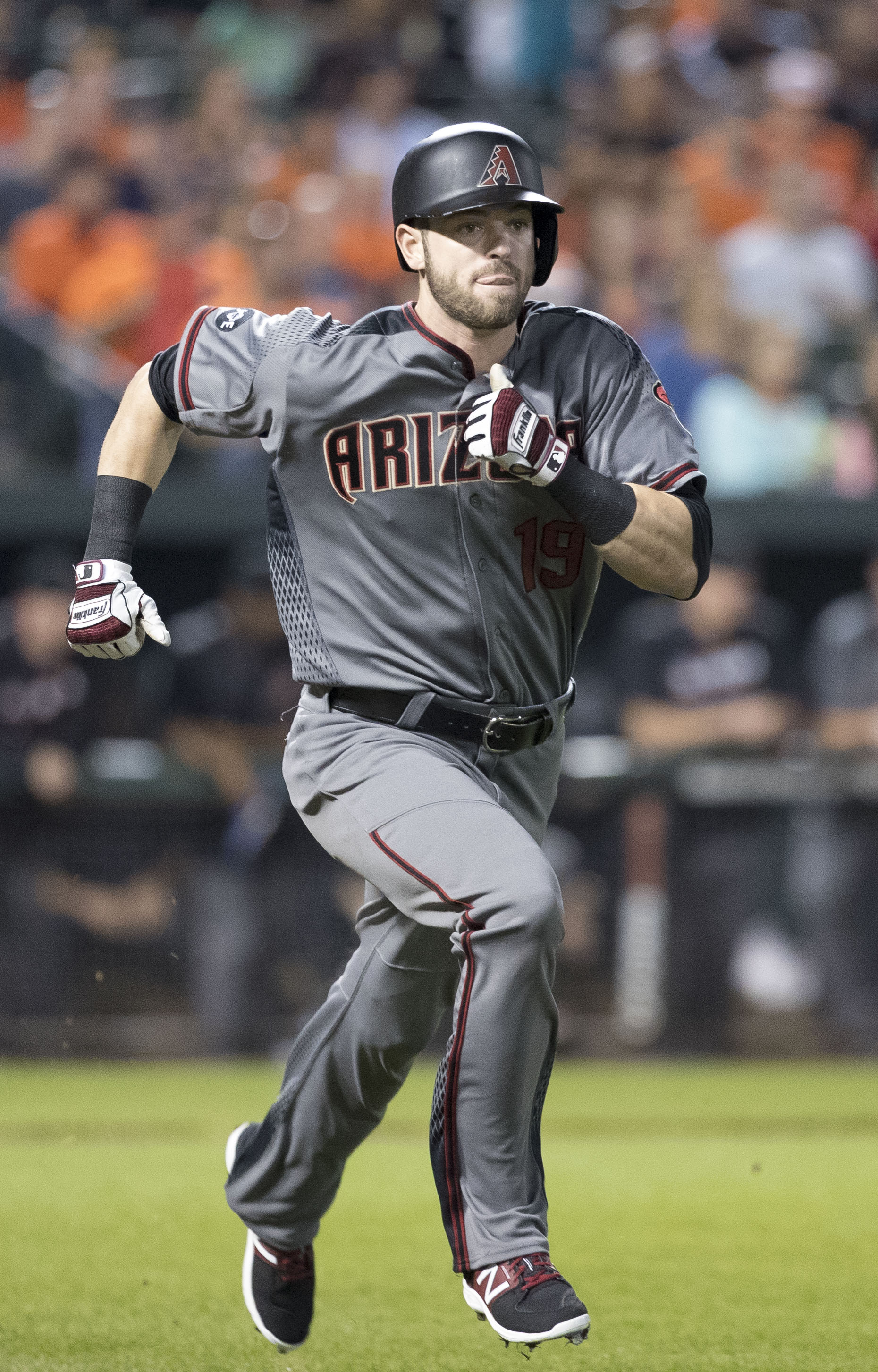
Haniger with the Arizona Diamondbacks

On July 31, 2014, the Brewers traded Haniger and Anthony Banda to the Arizona Diamondbacks for Gerardo Parra. He was out of action for two weeks after the trade, then played four games with the Arizona League Diamondbacks before returning to the Southern League, now with the Mobile BayBears. In 79 games in 2014 with three clubs, Haniger hit .259 with 11 home runs.

Haniger began the 2015 season with Mobile. Though he batted .281/.351/.379 in 55 games for Mobile, the Diamondbacks demoted him to the Visalia Rawhide of the Class A-Advanced California League in late June so that he could play more frequently. With Visalia, he hit .332/.381/.619 in 49 games, ranking in the top 10 in batting average and slugging percentage. He spent the 2015 season retooling his batting stance and swing to focus on generating more power.

==== 2016: Promotions and MLB debut ====
Haniger returned to Mobile to begin the 2016 season. He batted .294/.407/.462 with 8 hit by pitch in 55 games and was named to the Southern League All-Star Game. He was promoted to the Reno Aces of the Triple-A Pacific Coast League in June. In his first 64 games in Reno, he hit a scorching .351/.437/.697 with 19 home runs.

The Diamondbacks called up Haniger to the major leagues on August 16, 2016. He played his first major league game that night, becoming the first Diamondbacks player to have a triple as his first major league hit and have three RBIs in his inaugural game. Haniger played 10 games with Arizona before being sent down to Reno on August 26. He returned to the majors on September 7. With the Diamondbacks, he hit .229/.309/.404 in 34 games. He primarily played center field, but also played several games in both left field and right field. After the season, he was named the Diamondbacks Minor League Player of the Year after batting .321 with 25 home runs and 12 steals for Reno and Mobile.

=== Seattle Mariners ===
On November 23, 2016, the Diamondbacks traded Haniger, Jean Segura, and Zac Curtis to the Seattle Mariners for Ketel Marte and Taijuan Walker. Mariners general manager Jerry Dipoto said he expected Haniger to contribute in the outfield in 2017.

==== 2017: Rookie season ====
Haniger was rated the fifth-best prospect in the Mariners' farm system by Baseball America heading into the 2017 season. Haniger was the Mariners' Opening Day right fielder, batting second. He went on the 10-day disabled list (DL) with a strained oblique muscle on April 25, returning to the Mariners on June 11. He broke his finger after getting hit by a pitch on July 15. On July 29, Haniger was hit in the face by a 95-mile-per-hour (153 km/h) fastball from Jacob deGrom of the New York Mets, sending him back to the DL. He came back to the Mariners on August 19 and hit his first career grand slam, homering off Jake Odorizzi of the Tampa Bay Rays.

Haniger finished his rookie season batting .282/.352/.491 with 58 runs, 16 home runs, and 47 RBIs in 96 games. He primarily played right field, with limited action in the other outfield positions. He ranked as a slightly above average right fielder according to several defensive metrics.

==== 2018: All-Star ====
Coming off a productive yet injury-shortened rookie campaign, Haniger hit .272/.358/.488 with 18 home runs and 67 RBIs in 94 games before the All-Star break. He hit a game-winning 10th inning home run against the Rays on June 1. Haniger was named to the 2018 MLB All-Star Game, his first All-Star Game selection.

Haniger's breakout season ended with a .285/.366/.493 slash line with 58 runs, 26 home runs, 93 RBIs, and 7 sacrifice flies in 157 games, finishing 11th in AL MVP voting. His 15 game-winning RBIs ranked 6th in the major leagues. He posted a bWAR of 6.5, 8th-best among American League (AL) position players. He reached base at a high frequency, ranking 11th in on-base percentage and tied for 12th in walks in the AL. In addition, he displayed excellent defense in the outfield. His 12 outfield assists tied for the most in the majors with Billy Hamilton. He tied for 10th in the AL with 5 defensive runs saved, while leading AL right fielders with 8 errors. Other defensive metrics, including Ultimate Zone Rating and Outs Above Average, rated him as a below-average outfielder.

In November, Haniger played for the MLB All-Stars team in the 2018 MLB Japan All-Star Series. He batted .222 in the six-game exhibition series.

==== 2019–20: Slowed by injuries ====
Following the departure of teammates including Robinson Canó, Nelson Cruz, James Paxton and Edwin Diaz in the offseason, Haniger found himself as the new leader of the rebuilding Mariners team. The Mariners also considered trading Haniger to the Atlanta Braves after the 2018 season.

After a slow start, in which he hit .220/.314/.463 with 15 homers in 63 games, Haniger was placed on the injured list (IL) with a ruptured testicle after fouling off a fastball into his groin area on June 6. He was not wearing a protective cup. He missed the remainder of the season after also suffering a sports hernia and back and leg pain.

Haniger missed the 2020 season due to surgeries for the sports hernia and a herniated disc.

==== 2021: Career high in home runs ====
Haniger returned to baseball in 2021 and had one of his best seasons. He was named the AL Player of the Week for the week of July 18.

He hit .253/.318/.486 in 157 games with 110 runs, 39 home runs, 100 RBIs, 8 sacrifice flies, and 169 strikeouts. He set career highs in home runs, RBIs, and runs scored. He led the AL in range factor per game as a right fielder (2.22) and was second in fielding percentage (.989). Other defensive metrics again pegged him as slightly below average. He received one down-ballot vote for AL MVP, finishing tied for 20th.

==== 2022: First postseason ====
On June 16, Haniger was placed on the 60-day IL with an ankle injury. He was activated on August 6. In 2022, Haniger batted .246/.308/.429 in 57 regular season games, with 11 home runs and 34 RBIs.

Haniger started all five of the Mariners postseason games. He hit .238 with two doubles and two runs scored.

=== San Francisco Giants ===
On December 7, 2022, Haniger signed a three-year, $43.5 million contract with the San Francisco Giants. Haniger hit .230 in 40 games for the Giants before he was hit in the arm by a pitch from St. Louis Cardinals starter Jack Flaherty on June 13. He was diagnosed with a fractured right forearm that required surgery. Haniger was transferred to the 60-day IL on June 22. He was activated on August 29. In his single season with the Giants, Haniger had his worst offensive performance thus far, batting .209/.266/.365 in 61 games.

=== Seattle Mariners (second stint) ===
On January 5, 2024, the Giants traded Haniger, pitcher Anthony DeSclafani, and cash considerations to the Mariners for injured starter Robbie Ray. Haniger received a $1 million bonus due to the trade. Haniger was a regular in right field and DH to begin the season, but his playing time decreased after the team acquired outfielders Victor Robles and Randy Arozarena during the season. After August 1, Haniger played in only 29 of the team's final 52 games. On August 9, he broke a Mariners record by getting his 8th walk off RBI, surpassing Jim Presley. Haniger's offensive struggles persisted, as he hit .208/.286/.334 in 121 games in his return to Seattle. On November 4, Haniger declined to opt out of the final year of his contract.

Haniger was released by the Mariners on March 23, 2025.

== Personal life ==
Haniger married his high school sweetheart, Amanda Gimenez, in 2016. Their daughter Karly was born in December 2020. The family resides in Seattle.

Haniger's older brother Jason played catcher at Georgia Tech and was drafted by the Pittsburgh Pirates in the 19th round of the 2008 MLB draft, though he did not play in the minors. Their cousins Nik and Alex Balog also played baseball professionally. Haniger was high school teammates with both cousins.

Haniger's parents are Walt and Judy Haniger.

Haniger was college roommates with his childhood best friend and high school teammate Elliott Stewart, who later became a coach at Cal Poly.

Haniger was inducted into the Cal Poly Athletics Hall of Fame in 2022.
