= Braden Shipley =

American baseball player (born 1992)

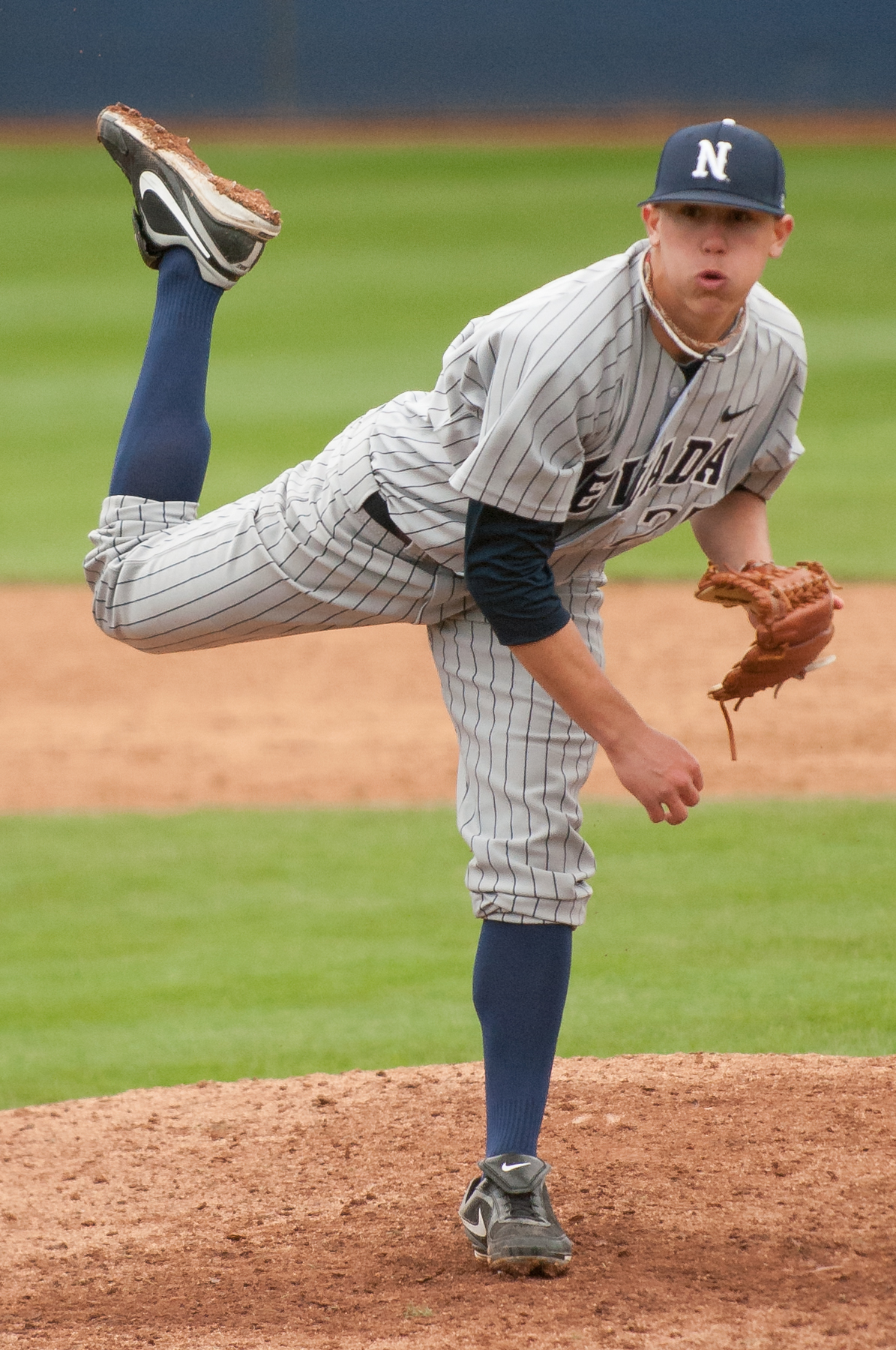
- Shipley with the Nevada Wolf Pack in 2011
- Pitcher
- Born: February 22, 1992 (age 33); Medford, Oregon, U.S.
- Batted: Right Threw: Right

MLB debut
- July 25, 2016, for the Arizona Diamondbacks

Last MLB appearance
- June 25, 2018, for the Arizona Diamondbacks

Career statistics
- Win–loss record: 4–6
- Earned run average: 5.49
- Strikeouts: 64
- Stats at Baseball Reference

Teams
- Arizona Diamondbacks (2016–2018)

Braden Alec Shipley (born February 22, 1992) is an American former professional baseball pitcher. Shipley attended the University of Nevada, Reno, where he played for the Nevada Wolf Pack baseball team. Prior to that, he attended North Medford High School in Medford, Oregon, and played for the school's baseball team. The Arizona Diamondbacks selected him with the 15th pick in the 2013 MLB draft, and he made his Major League Baseball (MLB) debut in 2016.

== Early life ==
Shipley grew up in Medford, Oregon, with his parents and two siblings. When Shipley was four years old, his father's friends would come to their house to watch Shipley hit plastic balls. He played in Little League Baseball.

== Amateur career ==
Shipley attended North Medford High School in Medford, Oregon. He began pitching during his junior year, and was not the ace of his team's pitching staff. In 2009, he competed for the Medford Mustangs in the American Legion Baseball, leading them to the American Legion World Series.

Shipley committed to attend Western Nevada College, until coaches from the University of Nevada, Reno baseball team observed Shipley at the Josh Anderson Memorial Tournament in Reno, Nevada. Shipley agreed to attend Nevada on a scholarship, where he would play college baseball for the Nevada Wolf Pack. As a freshman, Shipley was named to the All-Western Athletic Conference (WAC) second team as a shortstop. He pitched only ten innings that season due to the team's need at shortstop. In his sophomore and junior years at Nevada, Shipley has focused on pitching, and has received only 12 at bats. Shipley won the WAC pitcher of the year award as a sophomore, after pitching to a 9–4 win–loss record and a 2.20 earned run average (ERA). He also played collegiate summer baseball for the Anchorage Bucs of the Alaska Baseball League.

As a junior, Shipley was added to the Golden Spikes Award watch list. Shipley was considered one of the top available prospects in the 2013 MLB draft. Baseball America ranked Shipley the eighth best prospect, while Keith Law of ESPN.com predicted he would be chosen between the seventh and fifteenth overall selections. Shipley became the first first-round pick in Nevada Wolf Pack history.

== Professional career ==
=== Arizona Diamondbacks ===
The Arizona Diamondbacks selected Shipley with the 15th pick in the 2013 Major League Baseball draft. Shipley signed with the Diamondbacks for a $2.25 million signing bonus, and reported to the Low-A Hillsboro Hops of the Northwest League. He pitched to a 0–2 record and a 7.58 ERA in eight starts, while recording 24 strikeouts in 19 1/3 innings. He was promoted to the Single-A South Bend Silver Hawks of the Midwest League in August. He pitched for South Bend in the Midwest League playoffs.

Shipley began the 2014 season with South Bend, where he pitched to a 3.74 ERA with 41 strikeouts and 11 walks in 42 2/3 innings over eight games started. He received a promotion to the High-A Visalia Rawhide of the California League in June. He appeared in the 2014 All-Star Futures Game. In August, the Diamondbacks promoted Shipley to the Double-A Mobile BayBears of the Southern League. Shipley spent the 2015 season with Mobile, posting a 9–11 record and 3.50 ERA in 28 appearances. He began the 2016 season with the Triple-A Reno Aces of the Pacific Coast League.

The Diamondbacks promoted Shipley to the major leagues to make his debut on July 25, 2016. He made his MLB debut that day, pitching 5.1 innings and allowing 6 earned runs. He finished his rookie season with a 4–5 record and 5.27 ERA in 13 appearances. In 2017, Shipley split the year between Arizona and Reno, posting a 5.76 ERA in 10 big league games. In 2018, Shipley spent the majority of the year in Reno, and allowed 4 runs in 5 innings of work. On November 20, 2018, Shipley was outrighted off of the 40-man roster. He spent the 2019 season with Reno, logging a 4–5 record and 5.95 ERA with 88 strikeouts in 95 1/3 innings pitched. Shipley elected free agency following the season on November 4, 2019.

=== Kansas City Royals ===
On December 17, 2019, Shipley signed a minor league contract with the Kansas City Royals. Shipley did not play in a game in 2020 due to the cancellation of the minor league season because of the COVID-19 pandemic. He was released by the Royals organization on August 31, 2020.

=== Cincinnati Reds ===
On February 10, 2021, Shipley signed a minor league contract with the Cincinnati Reds organization that included an invitation to Spring Training. In 18 appearances with the Triple-A Louisville Bats, he recorded a 1–5 record and 7.07 ERA. Shipley was released by the Reds organization on July 7.

=== Acereros de Monclova ===
On July 19, 2021, Shipley signed with the Acereros de Monclova of the Mexican League. In 3 appearances, Shipley posted a 0–2 record and 8.38 ERA. He was released on August 7.

=== Seattle Mariners ===
On March 10, 2022, Shipley signed a minor league contract with the Seattle Mariners organization. Shipley appeared in 47 games for the Double-A Arkansas Travelers, posting a 3–1 record and 3.79 ERA with 58 strikeouts in 54.2 innings pitched. He elected free agency following the season on November 10.

On April 18, 2023, Shipley re-signed with the Mariners on a new minor league deal. However, he did not appear in a game for the organization and elected free agency following the season on November 6.

On February 10, 2024, Shipley once more re–signed with the Mariners on a minor league contract. He was released by Seattle on March 14.

== Personal life ==
Shipley's cousin, Jordan Shipley, played in the National Football League.
