= Jean Segura =

Dominican baseball player (born 1990)

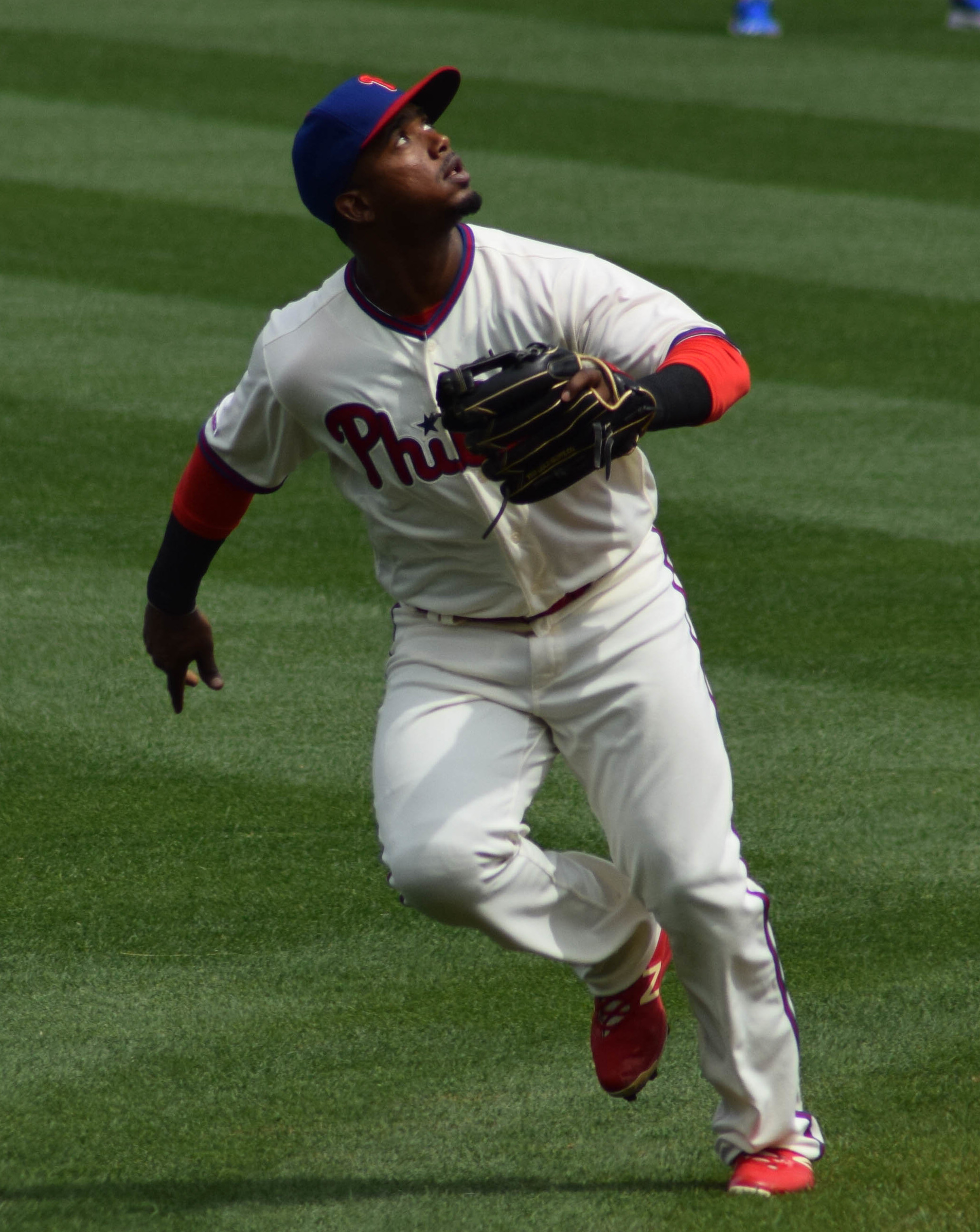
- Segura with the Philadelphia Phillies in 2019
- Shortstop / Second baseman
- Born: March 17, 1990 (age 36); San Juan de la Maguana, Dominican Republic
- Batted: Right Threw: Right

MLB debut
- July 24, 2012, for the Los Angeles Angels of Anaheim

Last MLB appearance
- July 31, 2023, for the Miami Marlins

MLB statistics
- Batting average: .281
- Home runs: 110
- Runs batted in: 513
- Stats at Baseball Reference

Teams
- Los Angeles Angels of Anaheim (2012); Milwaukee Brewers (2012–2015); Arizona Diamondbacks (2016); Seattle Mariners (2017–2018); Philadelphia Phillies (2019–2022); Miami Marlins (2023)

Career highlights and awards
- 2× All-Star (2013, 2018)

Jean Carlos Enrique Segura (/dʒiːn sɛɡuːrə/ JEEN seh-GOO-ruh; born March 17, 1990) is a Dominican former professional baseball infielder. He played in Major League Baseball (MLB) for the Los Angeles Angels of Anaheim, Milwaukee Brewers, Arizona Diamondbacks, Seattle Mariners, Philadelphia Phillies, and Miami Marlins. Segura was an All-Star in 2013 and 2018, and led the National League in hits in 2016. He played for the Dominican Republic national team at the 2017 and 2023 World Baseball Classic.

Segura signed with the Angels as a free agent in 2007. He made his MLB debut with the Angels in 2012 and was traded to the Brewers as part of a package for Zack Greinke. He played for Milwaukee through 2015, when he was traded to the Diamondbacks. Arizona traded him to Seattle after the 2016 season, and he signed a five-year, $70 million contract extension with the Mariners in 2017. After the 2018 season, Seattle traded Segura to Philadelphia. He signed as a free agent with Miami in 2023, then retired in 2025.

== Professional career ==
=== Los Angeles Angels ===
Segura signed with the Los Angeles Angels of Anaheim as an international free agent in 2007. He made his professional debut with the Dominican Summer Angels of the Rookie-level Dominican Summer League (DSL) in 2007. He batted .324/.392/.393 with 22 stolen bases and seven sacrifice hits (seventh in the league) in 219 at-bats, and was named a DSL postseason All-Star. He played 11 games for the Arizona Angels of the Rookie-level Arizona League in 2008, and fractured his left leg.

In 2009, Segura played for the Orem Owlz of the Rookie-level Pioneer League, and also played in five games for the Salt Lake Bees of the Triple-A Pacific Coast League, batting .354/.395/.514 with 11 stolen bases in 181 at bats between the two teams. His season was limited by a broken finger on his right hand. He had a 22-game hitting streak with the Owlz, one short of the franchise record. While playing for them was tied for eighth in the Pioneer League in triples (4), and eighth in batting average (.346).

In 2010, Segura played for the Cedar Rapids Kernels of the Single-A Midwest League, where he had a standout year. He was the May 24 Midwest League Player of the Week and led the league with 50 stolen bases and 161 hits, also hitting 12 triples (second in the league), 10 home runs, and 24 doubles, while recording 11 sacrifice hits (third), 89 runs (fourth), 79 runs batted in (RBIs) (seventh), and batting .313 (10th). He was named a Midwest League mid-season All-Star, and an MiLB.com Angels Organization All-Star. He was promoted to the Inland Empire 66ers of the Class A-Advanced California League in 2011, but missed a significant portion of the season after suffering a torn left hamstring and only played in 44 games for the team, batting .281/.337/.422 with 18 stolen bases in 185 at-bats. Segura was added to the Angels 40-man roster on November 18.

Segura played for the Arkansas Travelers of the Double-ATexas League in 2012. After batting .287 with 25 stolen bases in his first 69 games of the season, he was named to appear in the 2012 All-Star Futures Game. For the season in Double-A, he batted .304/.358/.413 with 37 stolen bases in 404 at-bats. He was fourth in the Texas League in stolen bases (33), tied for eighth in sacrifice hits (6), and 9th in triples (5). He was named a mid-season Texas League All-Star, and was again named an MiLB.com Angels Organization All-Star. On July 24, he made his MLB debut at shortstop for the Angels.

=== Milwaukee Brewers ===
After playing in only one game for the Angels, Segura was traded to the Milwaukee Brewers along with John Hellweg and Ariel Peña for Zack Greinke on July 27, 2012. The Brewers assigned him to the Huntsville Stars of the Double-A Southern League and promoted him on August 6 after he batted 13-for-30 in eight games with the club. He batted .264/.321/.331 with seven stolen bases and 14 RBIs in 148 at-bats with the Brewers.

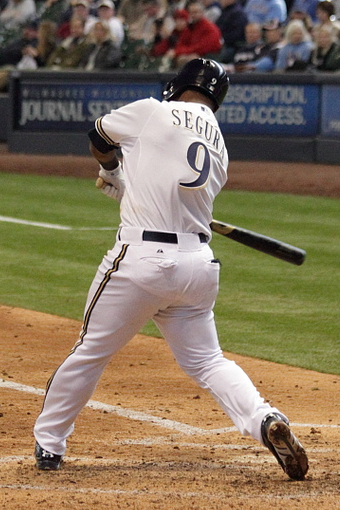
Segura batting in 2013

In the offseason, Segura played in the Dominican Winter League, and won the league's batting title with a .324 batting average, as he was also second in the league with 11 stolen bases. He was named the Brewers' Opening Day shortstop in 2013. He was a National League (NL) reserve for the MLB All-Star Game. He won the Player of the Week Award on May 12 and finished the year hitting .294/.329/.423 with 10 triples and 44 stolen bases (each second in the NL), 12 home runs, an 18.9 power–speed number (ninth in the league), and 7.0 at bats per strikeout (10th-lowest) in 588 at-bats. His walk percentage of 4.0% was tied for the 6th-lowest in MLB.

In 2014, he batted .246/.289/.326 with 7.3 at-bats per strikeout (seventh-lowest), and 10 sacrifice hits (10th in the league) in 513 at-bats. On defense. Segura led all NL fielders with 447 assists.

In 2015, Segura batted .257/.281/.336 with 25 stolen bases (fifth in the NL), and an 80.65% stolen base percentage (10th) in 560 at-bats. He walked in 2.2% of his at-bats, the lowest percentage in the majors, and had the lowest walks-to-strikeout ratio in the majors (0.14).

==== "Stealing first base" ====
In the eighth inning of a game on April 19, 2013, Segura stole second base, and then "stole" first base, then was thrown out trying to again steal second base. After Segura singled and stole second, and Ryan Braun walked, Segura and Braun attempted a double steal. However, Segura retreated to second after the pitcher Shawn Camp threw to third base instead of pitching. With both Segura and Braun standing on second base, both were tagged, and by baseball's rules, Braun was ruled out. However, Segura thought that he himself was out and began to head back to the Brewers' dugout, which was on the first-base side of the field, until first base coach Garth Iorg instructed Segura to stand on first base, where he was ruled safe. Two pitches later, Segura was caught stealing second base.

The play resulted in much confusion regarding whether Segura should have been allowed to retreat to first base after he had legitimately occupied second base. The umpires allowed it under a rule that specifies only that a player may not retreat if the intent is to "confuse the defense or make a travesty of the game," as Segura was doing no such thing but was simply confused. MLB later declared that the ruling on the field was wrong, as a rule forbidding a player from reaching a base after "abandoning the effort" at base running should have superseded the rule invoked when calling him safe, and that Segura should have been called out at first base.

Because the usual methods of reporting baseball play-by-play do not allow for a runner on second to retreat to first base, some records of the game indicate that Segura remained on second and was thrown out trying to steal third base, though this is not what occurred.

=== Arizona Diamondbacks ===
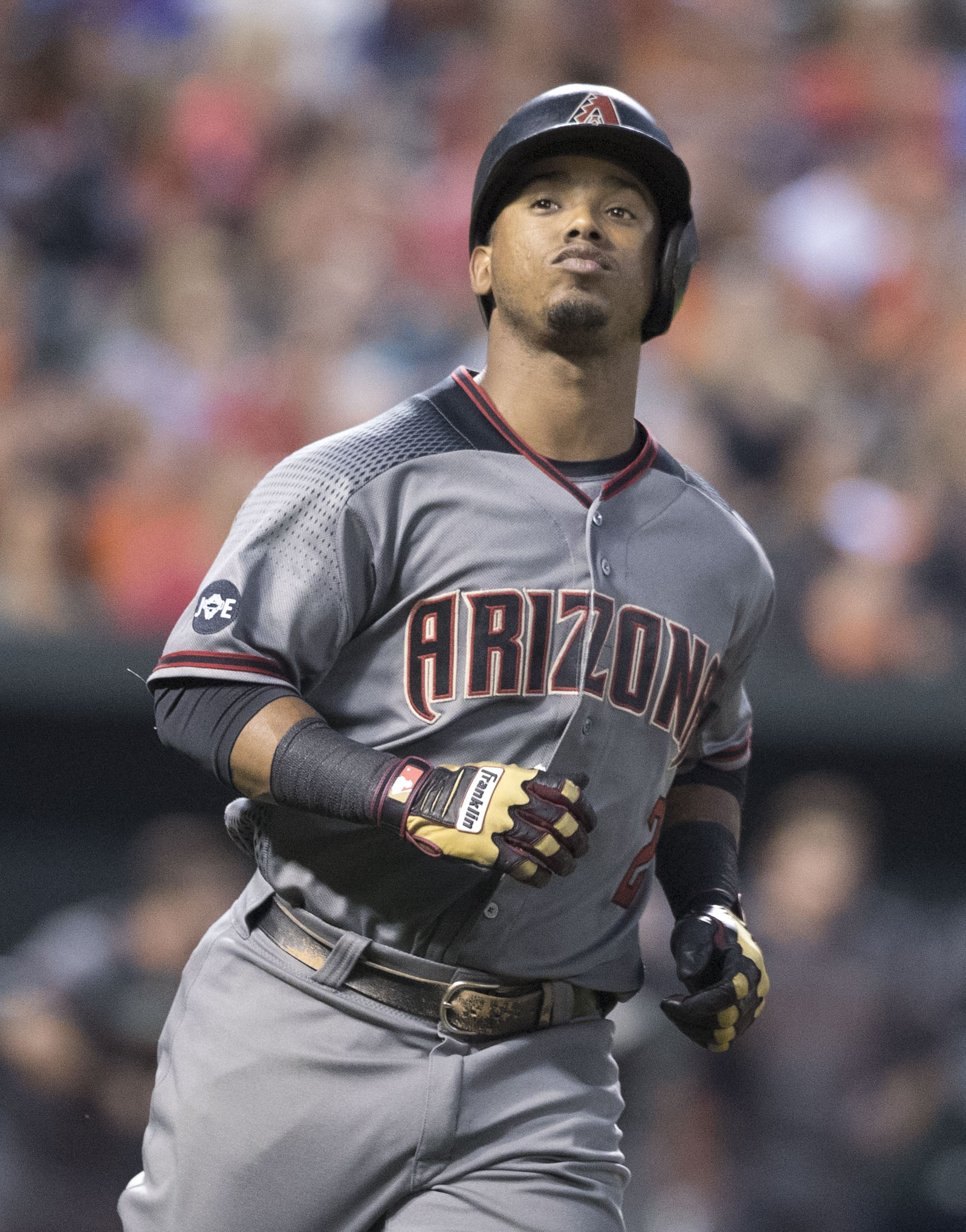
Segura with the Diamondbacks in 2016

On January 30, 2016, the Brewers traded Segura and Tyler Wagner to the Arizona Diamondbacks for Aaron Hill, Chase Anderson, Isan Diaz, and cash. In 153 games in 2016, most of which he played at second base—for the first time in the majors—Segura batted .319 (fifth in the NL)/.368 (a career best)/.499, with an NL-leading 203 hits, 135 singles (second), a 24.9 power–speed number (fourth), 41 doubles and 33 stolen bases (each, fifth), 102 runs (seventh), 7 triples (8th), and 20 home runs, while on defense leading all NL players in assists with 428. He came in 13th in the voting for NL Most Valuable Player.

=== Seattle Mariners ===
On November 23, 2016, the Diamondbacks traded Segura, Zac Curtis, and Mitch Haniger to the Seattle Mariners for Taijuan Walker and Ketel Marte.

In June 2017, Segura signed a five-year, $70 million contract extension covering the 2018–2022 seasons with a $17 million option for 2023 that had a $1 million buyout. He returned to shortstop and ended the season batting .300/.349/.427 with 22 stolen bases in 125 games.

In 2018, while batting .329 mid-season, he was named to the All-Star Game, in which he hit a go-ahead three-run home run off of Josh Hader in the 8th inning. For the season, Segura batted .304 (seventh in the AL)/.341/.415, with 136 singles (leading the majors), 178 hits (sixth), and 20 stolen bases while striking out once every 8.5 at-bats (fifth-fewest), as on defense he was third in the American League in assists with 387. He had the fourth-lowest whiff rate (12.6%; missing on just 136 of his 1,080 swings) among all qualified hitters, and the ninth-best contact rate (48.8%; 527 of his 1,080 swings were put in play), and led all major league batters in three-hit games (20) and tied for first in infield hits (36). He became one of only four MLB batters with a .300 or better batting average over the last three years, along with Jose Altuve, Freddie Freeman, and Mike Trout. He and Starling Marté were the only two MLB players to have stolen 20 or more bases each season since 2013. Over his two seasons with the Mariners, he batted a combined .302/.345/.421 as Seattle's shortstop. Among regulars at shortstop in those two years, his 112 OPS+ ranked fourth behind Francisco Lindor, Xander Bogaerts, and Didi Gregorius.

=== Philadelphia Phillies ===
On December 3, 2018, the Mariners traded Segura, Juan Nicasio, and James Pazos to the Philadelphia Phillies for Carlos Santana and J. P. Crawford. Segura waived the no-trade clause in his contract to allow the trade.

In 2019, Segura batted .280/.323/.420 with 79 runs, 37 doubles (eighth in the NL), 12 home runs, 60 RBIs, and 10 stolen bases in 576 at-bats. He made contact with the highest percentage of pitches he swung at in the strike zone (94.3%) of all NL batters. He had 1 strikeout per 7.9 at-bats, second-best in the NL, and on defense, his 20 errors lef the league and his 83 double plays were fourth-most among NL shortstops.

In the pandemic-shortened 2020 season, Segura batted .266/.347/.422 with 7 home runs and 25 RBIs in 54 games. In 2021, Segura batted .290/.348/.436 with 14 home runs, 58 RBIs, and 9 stolen bases in 131 games. He led all NL second basemen with 85 double plays and a 4.66 range factor.

On June 1, 2022, Segura was placed on the injured list after suffering a fractured right index finger, an injury that came with a recovery timetable of 10-to-12 weeks. He was activated on August 4, and assumed the vacant shortstop role that was opened when Didi Gregorius was released. In 2022, Segura batted .277/.336/.387 in 354 at-bats, with 10 home runs and 33 RBIs. He stole 13 bases and was sixth in the NL in caught stealing (6), and ninth in double plays grounded into (16).

On November 7, 2022, the Phillies declined Segura's $17 million club option, making him a free agent for the first time in his career.

=== Miami Marlins ===
On January 4, 2023, Segura signed a two-year, $17 million contract with the Miami Marlins. On August 1, Segura and Kahlil Watson were traded to the Cleveland Guardians for first baseman Josh Bell; however, Segura was immediately released after the deal was made official. Prior to the trade, Segura appeared in 85 games for Miami, batting .219/.277/.279 with three home runs and 21 RBI.

=== Baltimore Orioles ===
On August 9, 2024, Segura signed a minor league contract with the Baltimore Orioles. In 14 games for the Triple-A Norfolk Tides, he slashed .137/.250/.196 with three RBI and one stolen base. Segura was released by the Orioles organization on September 1.

=== Leones del Escogido ===
Following the 2024 season, Segura signed with the Leones del Escogido to play winter league baseball in the Dominican Professional Baseball League. Segura announced his retirement from professional baseball on May 21, 2025.

== Personal life ==
Segura and his wife have three sons. He had a son from a previous relationship who died in 2014 at nine months of age, which nearly caused Segura to quit baseball.
