= Kyle Jensen =

American baseball player (born 1988)

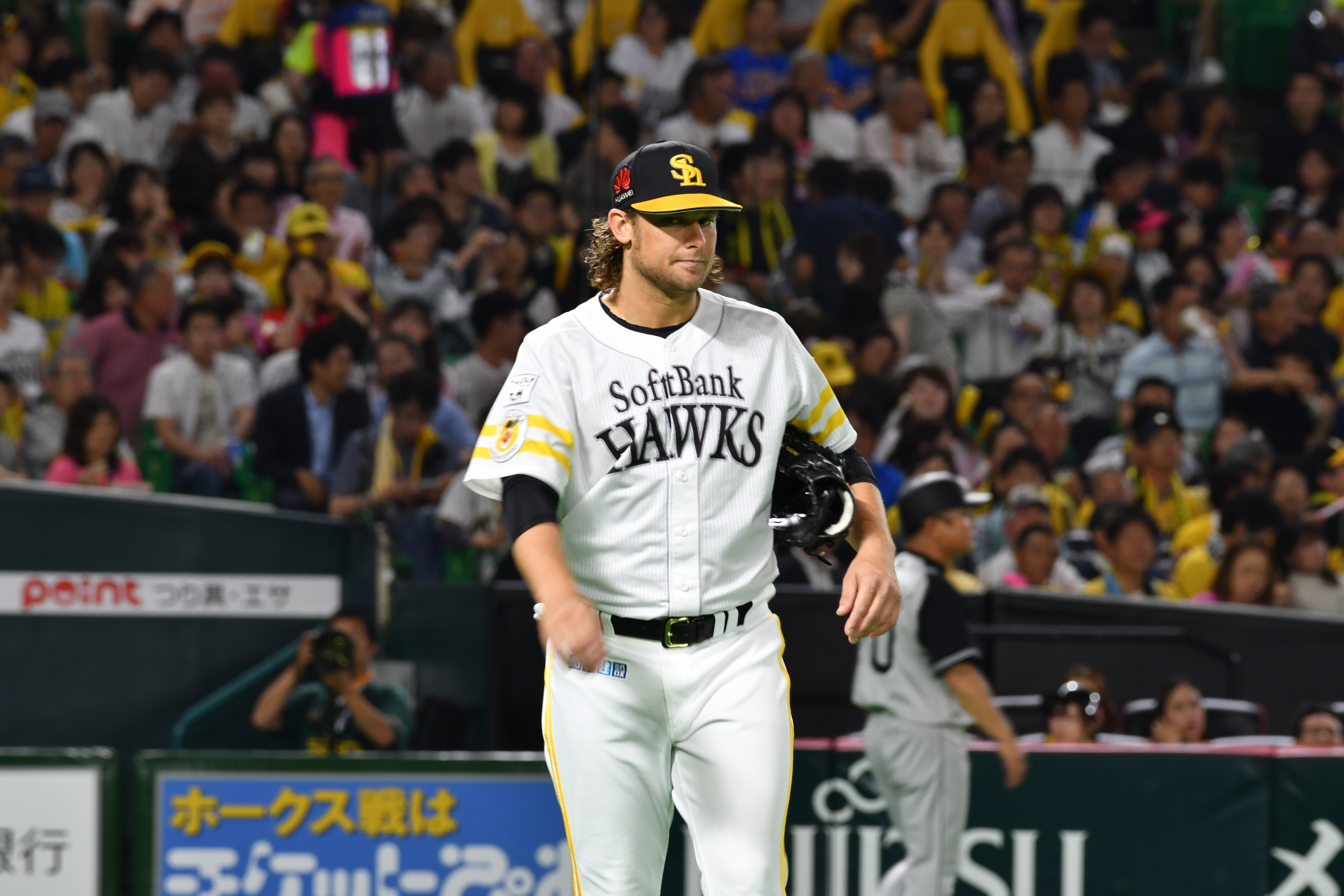
- Jensen with the Fukuoka SoftBank Hawks
- First baseman/Outfielder
- Born: May 20, 1988 (age 37); Walnut Creek, California, U.S.
- Batted: Right Threw: Left

Professional debut
- MLB: September 3, 2016, for the Arizona Diamondbacks
- NPB: June 6, 2017, for the Fukuoka SoftBank Hawks

Last appearance
- MLB: October 2, 2016, for the Arizona Diamondbacks
- NPB: June 11, 2017, for the Fukuoka SoftBank Hawks

MLB statistics
- Batting average: .194
- Home runs: 2
- Runs batted in: 7

NPB statistics
- Batting average: .083
- Home runs: 1
- Runs batted in: 1
- Stats at Baseball Reference

Teams
- Arizona Diamondbacks (2016); Fukuoka SoftBank Hawks (2017)

Career highlights and awards
- Japan Series champion (2017)

Kyle Gregory Jensen (born May 20, 1988) is an American former professional baseball outfielder. He played in Major League Baseball (MLB) for the Arizona Diamondbacks, and in Nippon Professional Baseball (NPB) for the Fukuoka SoftBank Hawks.

== Career ==
Jensen attended high school at St. Mary's High School in Stockton, California.

=== Florida/Miami Marlins ===
He was drafted by the Florida Marlins in the 12th round of the 2009 MLB draft out of St. Mary's College of California. On November 20, 2012, the Marlins added Jensen to their 40-man roster to protect him from the Rule 5 draft. Jensen started the 2013 season with the Double-A Jacksonville Suns before being promoted to the Triple-A New Orleans Zephyrs. With Jacksonville, he hit .237, with 16 doubles, 16 homers, 42 RBI, and five stolen bases. With New Orleans, he hit .233 with 15 doubles, 12 homers, 36 RBI, and one stolen base. Jensen began the 2014 season with New Orleans, hitting .260 with 27 homers, 92 RBI, and one stolen base.

=== Los Angeles Dodgers ===
Jensen was traded to the Los Angeles Dodgers on November 17, 2014, in exchange for a player to be named later or cash considerations. On December 15, the Dodgers sent minor leaguer Craig Stem to the Marlins to complete the transaction. Jensen was designated for assignment by the Dodgers on December 19, but cleared waivers and was outrighted to the Triple-A Oklahoma City Dodgers. The Dodgers invited him to attend major league spring training in 2015. He spent the 2015 season with Oklahoma City, playing in 128 games, hitting .259 with 20 homers and 71 RBI.

=== Arizona Diamondbacks ===
On November 11, 2015, Jensen signed a minor league contract with the Arizona Diamondbacks organization. He began the 2016 season with the Triple-A Reno Aces, playing in 133 games and hitting .289/.350/.546 with 30 home runs and 120 RBI. On September 3, 2016, the Diamondbacks selected Jensen's contract, adding him to their active roster. In 17 appearances for Arizona, he went 6-for-31 (.194) with two home runs and seven RBI. On November 20, Jensen was designated for assignment by the Diamondbacks.

=== Fukuoka SoftBank Hawks ===
On November 29, 2016, Jensen's contract was sold to the Fukuoka SoftBank Hawks of Nippon Professional Baseball. Jensen appeared in six games for the Hawks, going 1-for-12 (.083) with one home run and one RBI. On November 3, 2017, the Fukuoka SoftBank Hawks released Jensen.

=== San Francisco Giants ===
On January 9, 2018, Jensen signed a minor league contract with the San Francisco Giants. In 52 appearances for the Triple-A Sacramento River Cats, he batted .196/.251/.317 with five home runs and 27 RBI. Jensen was released by the Giants organization on June 5.
