= Zack Godley =

American baseball player (born 1990)

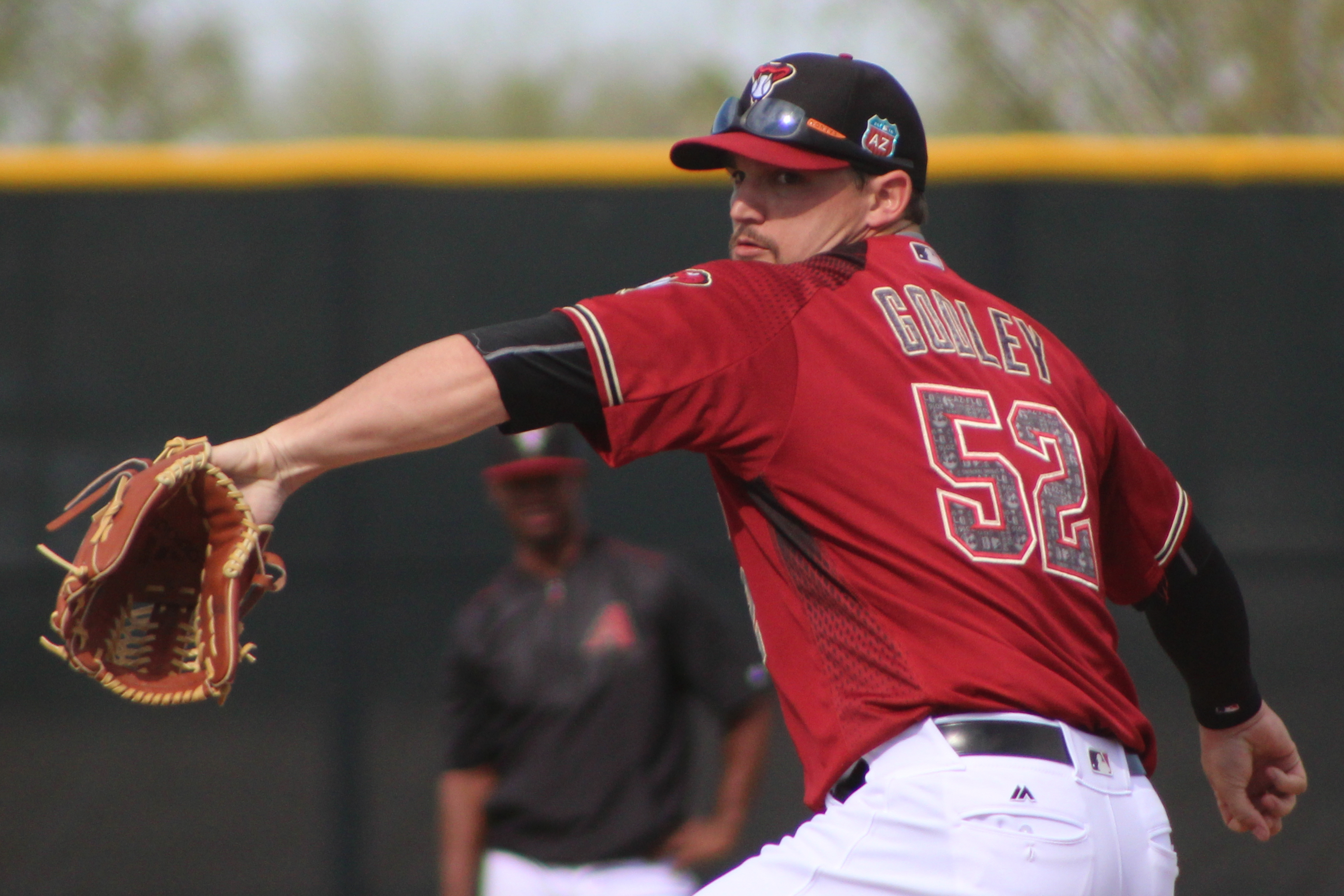
- Godley with the Arizona Diamondbacks
- Pitcher
- Born: April 21, 1990 (age 36); Bamberg, South Carolina, U.S.
- Batted: Right Threw: Right

MLB debut
- July 23, 2015, for the Arizona Diamondbacks

Last MLB appearance
- June 20, 2021, for the Milwaukee Brewers

MLB statistics
- Win–loss record: 37–35
- Earned run average: 4.92
- Strikeouts: 547
- Stats at Baseball Reference

Teams
- Arizona Diamondbacks (2015–2019); Toronto Blue Jays (2019); Boston Red Sox (2020); Milwaukee Brewers (2021)

Zachary Thomas Godley (born April 21, 1990) is an American former professional baseball pitcher. He played in Major League Baseball (MLB) for the Arizona Diamondbacks, Toronto Blue Jays, Boston Red Sox, and Milwaukee Brewers.

== Professional career ==
=== Chicago Cubs ===
Godley attended Bamberg-Ehrhardt High School. In 2009, as a senior, he went 9–3 with a 2.24 ERA. He was drafted by the New York Mets in the 50th round of the 2009 MLB draft but did not sign and instead enrolled at Spartanburg Methodist College where he played college baseball. After his freshman season, he transferred to the University of Tennessee. In 2013, his senior year, he went 5–7 with a 3.49 ERA in 16 games (14 starts). After the season, he was then drafted by the Chicago Cubs in the 10th round of the 2013 MLB draft and signed.

Godley signed and made his professional debut that season with the AZL Cubs and was promoted to the Boise Hawks after one game. In 13 relief appearances for Boise he compiled a 2–0 record and 2.03 ERA. Godley spent 2014 with the Kane County Cougars and Daytona Cubs, pitching to a combined 4–3 record and 3.09 ERA in 55.1 relief innings pitched.

=== Arizona Diamondbacks ===
On December 9, 2014, Godley, along with Jeferson Mejia, was traded to the Arizona Diamondbacks for Miguel Montero. He began 2015 with Visalia Rawhide and was promoted to the Mobile BayBears in June.

Godley made his MLB debut on July 23, 2015, against the Milwaukee Brewers. He threw six scoreless innings, striking out seven and walking none as he earned the win as Arizona defeated Milwaukee, 8–3. He became the first pitcher since 1900 with 6-plus scoreless innings, no walks and 7 or more strikeouts in his MLB debut. Godley was recalled and demoted multiple times during the 2015 season after his debut. In nine games (six starts) for Arizona he was 5–1 with a 3.19 ERA, and in 21 games (17 starts) between Visalia and Mobile, he was 10–4 with a 2.71 ERA.

Godley began 2016 with Mobile and was promoted to the Reno Aces in May. He was recalled and demoted twice before being called up for the remainder of the season in July. In 15 games (14 starts) between Mobile and Reno he pitched to a 4–6 record and 3.62 ERA, and in 27 games for Arizona, he compiled a 5–4 record and 6.39 ERA.

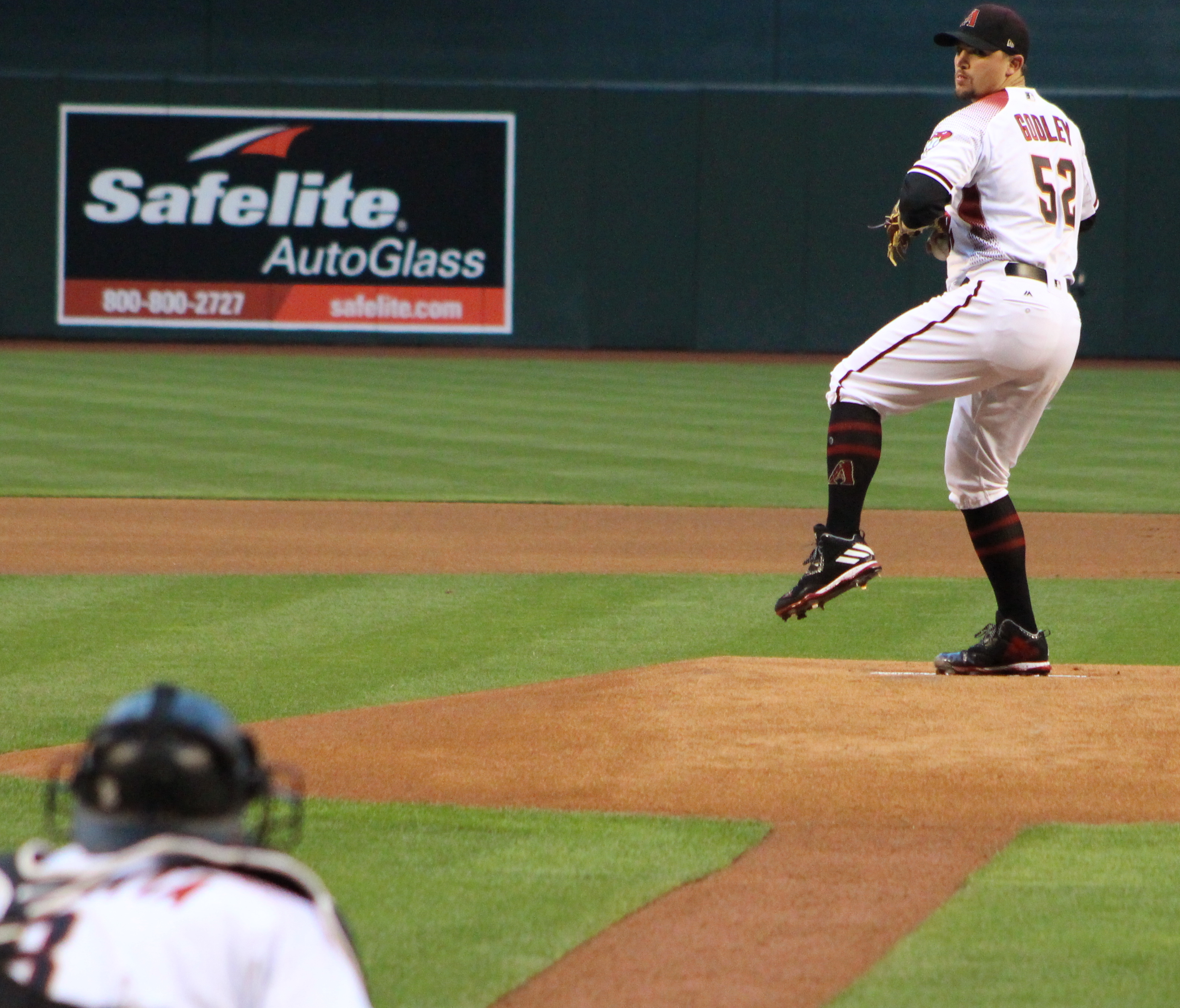
Godley pitching in 2017

In 2017, Godley began the season back with Reno. He was recalled in June and spent the rest of 2017 with Arizona. In 26 games (25 starts) for the Diamondbacks he was 8–9 with a 3.37 ERA.

Godley began the 2018 season with Arizona as a member of the starting rotation. He finished the season with a 15–11 record in 33 games (32 starts), with a 4.74 ERA. He struck out 185 batters in 178 1/3 innings. He led the major leagues in wild pitches, with 17. He also led all major league pitchers in curveball percentage (40.3%).

During the 2019 season, Godley appeared in 27 games for Arizona (nine starts), compiling a 3–5 record with 6.39 ERA in 76 innings pitched. On August 5, Godley was designated for assignment.

=== Toronto Blue Jays ===
The Toronto Blue Jays claimed Godley off waivers on August 7, 2019. He appeared in six games for the Blue Jays, recording one win and registering a 3.94 ERA in 16 innings pitched. On September 3, Godley was designated for assignment. He elected free agency on September 8.

=== Detroit Tigers ===
On December 20, 2019, the Detroit Tigers signed Godley to a minor league contract with an invitation to spring training. In March 2020, Godley was released, then re-signed by the Tigers on a minor league pact. On July 13, 2020, Godley was again released by the Tigers.

=== Boston Red Sox ===
On July 17, 2020, Godley signed a minor league deal with the Boston Red Sox. He was added to the team's active roster on July 26 and made his first appearance with Boston the next day, pitching four innings of scoreless relief in a 7–4 loss to the New York Mets. He was placed on the 10-day injured list on September 10 and moved to the 45-day injured list on September 19. Godley appeared in eight games (seven starts) for the 2020 Red Sox, compiling an 0–4 record with 8.16 ERA and 28 strikeouts in 28 2/3 innings. On October 26, Godley was outrighted off of the 40-man roster and elected free agency.

=== Milwaukee Brewers ===
On March 19, 2021, Godley signed a minor league contract with the Milwaukee Brewers. On April 28, Godley was selected to the active roster to be the starting pitcher in a game against the Miami Marlins and allowed 3 earned runs in 3 innings, taking the loss. The next day, he was placed on the injured list with a right index finger contusion. On May 10, Godley was activated from the injured list and designated for assignment. He cleared outright waivers on May 12 and was assigned outright to Triple-A. On June 18, Godley was re-selected to the active roster. After allowing 3 earned runs in 1/3 inning, Godley was again designated for assignment on June 21. He was outrighted to Triple-A on June 24. However, Godley rejected the outright assignment and elected free agency the next day.

=== Cleveland Indians and New York Mets (2021) ===
On June 28, 2021, Godley signed a minor league contract with the Cleveland Indians organization and was assigned to the Columbus Clippers of the Triple-A East. Godley was released by the Indians on August 2.

On August 7, Godley signed a minor league deal with the New York Mets. Godley made 4 starts for the Triple-A Syracuse Mets, going 2–0 with a 2.33 ERA and 17 strikeouts. On August 30, Godley was granted his release by the Mets.

=== Cincinnati Reds ===
On February 21, 2022, Godley signed a minor league contract with the Cincinnati Reds. In 14 games for the Triple-A Louisville Bats, he struggled to an 8.06 ERA with 29 strikeouts across 22 1/3 innings pitched. On May 26, Godley was released by the Reds organization.

=== Gastonia Honey Hunters ===
On June 7, 2022, Godley signed with the Gastonia Honey Hunters of the Atlantic League of Professional Baseball. In 15 games (11 starts) for Gastonia, he recorded a 4.64 ERA with 64 strikeouts in 54 1/3 innings. Godley became a free agent following the season. On April 19, 2023, Godley re-signed with the Honey Hunters. In 13 starts for Gastonia, he registered a 5–3 record and 4.79 ERA with 86 strikeouts in 71 1/3 innings pitched.

=== Oakland Athletics ===
On July 18, 2023, Godley signed a minor league contract with the Oakland Athletics organization. He made 12 appearances (10 starts) for the Triple-A Las Vegas Aviators, registering a 5.21 ERA with 57 strikeouts across 57 innings of work. Godley elected free agency following the season on November 6.

== Personal ==
Godley and his wife have two daughters.
