= Steve Hathaway =

American baseball player (born 1990)

- Pitcher
- Born: September 13, 1990 (age 35); Acton, Massachusetts, U.S.
- Batted: Left Threw: Left

MLB debut
- July 31, 2016, for the Arizona Diamondbacks

Last MLB appearance
- October 2, 2016, for the Arizona Diamondbacks

MLB statistics
- Win–loss record: 0-0
- Earned run average: 4.91
- Strikeouts: 15
- Stats at Baseball Reference

Teams
- Arizona Diamondbacks (2016)

Steven Ryland Hathaway (born September 13, 1990) is an American former professional baseball pitcher who played in Major League Baseball (MLB) for the Arizona Diamondbacks.

== Amateur career ==
Hathaway attended Acton-Boxborough Regional High School in Acton, Massachusetts, and Franklin Pierce University. In 2011, he played collegiate summer baseball in the Cape Cod Baseball League for the Yarmouth-Dennis Red Sox.

== Professional career ==
The Arizona Diamondbacks selected Hathaway in the 14th round (420th overall) of the 2013 Major League Baseball draft.

Hathaway began the 2016 season with the Double-A Mobile BayBears, and received a promotion to the Triple-A Reno Aces during the season. On July 30, 2016, Hathaway was selected to the 40-man roster and promoted to the major leagues for the first time. Hathaway made 24 appearances for the Diamondbacks during his rookie campaign, recording a 4.91 ERA with 15 strikeouts across 14 2/3 innings pitched.

Hathaway dealt with shoulder bursitis to begin the 2017 season, necessitating a disabled list placement to begin the year. He made only one appearance for the Double-A Jackson Generals during the year, missing the majority of the year due to persisting shoulder issues. Hathaway was transferred to the 60-day injured list on May 6, 2017. On October 16, Hathaway was removed from the 40-man roster and sent outright to Triple-A Reno.

Hathaway did not make an appearance for the organization during the 2018 season. He was released by the Diamondbacks on March 14, 2019.

As of 2020, Hathaway had the most career Major League pitching appearances without a game started or a game finished.
