= Zac Curtis =

American baseball player (born 1992)

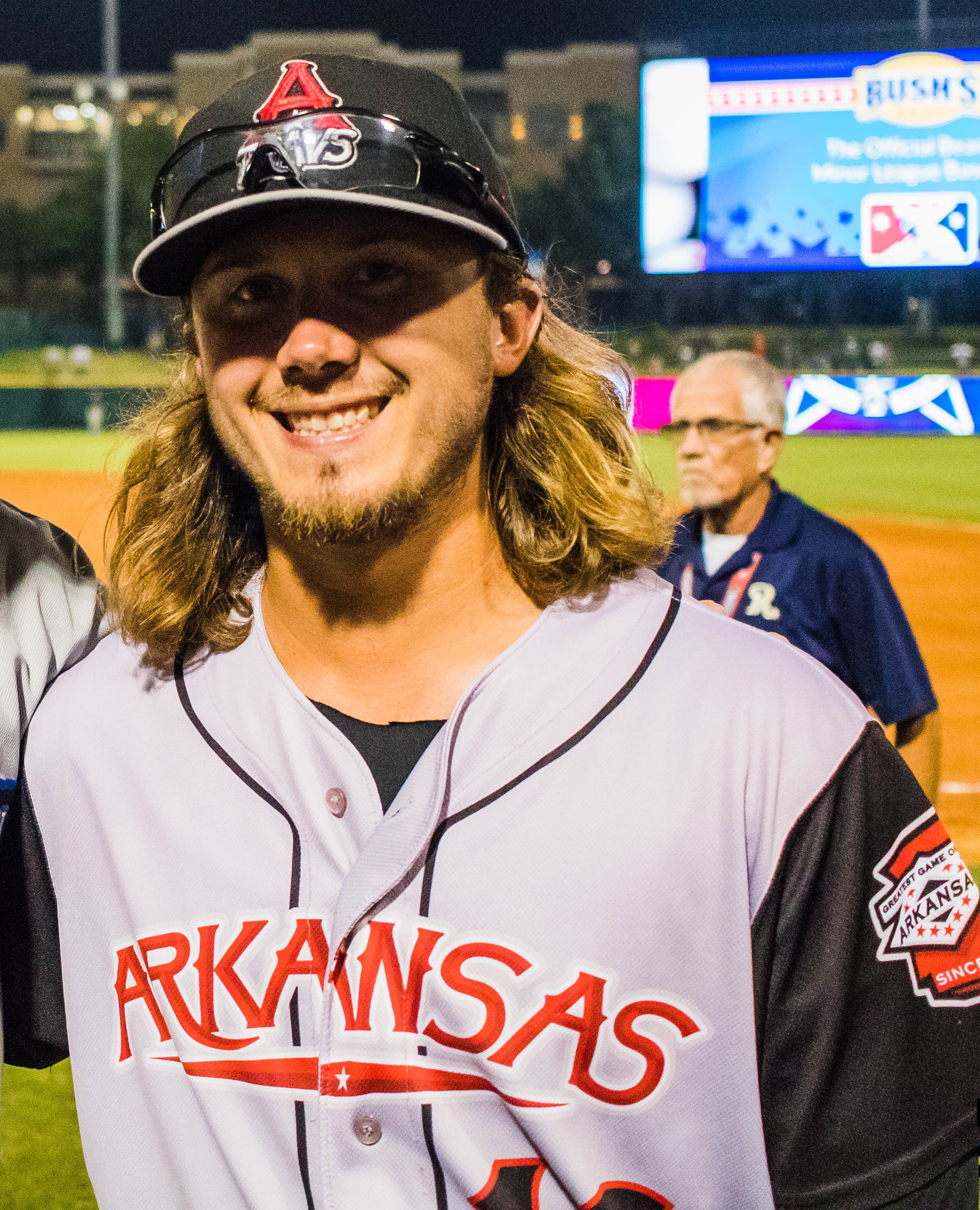
- Curtis at the Texas League All-Star Game in 2017
- Pitcher
- Born: July 4, 1992 (age 33); Panama City Beach, Florida, U.S.
- Batted: Left Threw: Left

MLB debut
- April 30, 2016, for the Arizona Diamondbacks

Last MLB appearance
- September 30, 2018, for the Texas Rangers

MLB statistics
- Win–loss record: 0–2
- Earned run average: 4.74
- Strikeouts: 34
- Stats at Baseball Reference

Teams
- Arizona Diamondbacks (2016); Seattle Mariners (2017); Philadelphia Phillies (2017–2018); Texas Rangers (2018)

Zachary Aaron Curtis (born July 4, 1992), is an American former professional baseball pitcher. He played in Major League Baseball (MLB) for the Arizona Diamondbacks, Seattle Mariners, Philadelphia Phillies, and Texas Rangers.

== Career ==
=== Arizona Diamondbacks ===
Curtis attended Hendersonville High School in Hendersonville, Tennessee. He played college baseball at Volunteer State Community College and Middle Tennessee State University. The Arizona Diamondbacks selected Curtis in the sixth round of the 2014 MLB draft. He made his professional debut in 2014 with the Hillsboro Hops. Curtis was called up to the majors for the first time on April 30, 2016, and made his major league debut that night.

=== Seattle Mariners ===
On November 23, 2016, the Diamondbacks traded Curtis to the Seattle Mariners, along with Jean Segura and Mitch Haniger, for Taijuan Walker and Ketel Marte.

He began the 2017 season with the Arkansas Travelers of the Double-A Texas League and was called up by the Mariners on May 11, 2017. He pitched his first game for the Mariners that evening against the Toronto Blue Jays at Rogers Centre in Toronto. On September 4, Curtis was designated for assignment.

=== Philadelphia Phillies ===
On September 11, 2017, the Philadelphia Phillies claimed Curtis off waivers. Curtis was designated for assignment on July 31, 2018.

=== Texas Rangers ===
On August 7, 2018, the Texas Rangers claimed Curtis off waivers and immediately optioned him to the Triple-A Round Rock Express. He was promoted to the major leagues on September 1.

On December 17, 2018, Curtis re-signed with the Rangers organization on a minor league contract, after being non-tendered earlier in the offseason. He was assigned to the Triple-A Nashville Sounds to open the 2019 season, for whom he logged a 1-1 record and 8.90 ERA with 40 strikeouts and one save across 30 1/3 innings pitched. Curtis was released by the Rangers organization on July 12, 2019.

== Personal life ==
Curtis married Chelsea Richardson in 2014. They met at Volunteer State Community College.
