= 2016 Cincinnati Reds season =

2016 Cincinnati Reds
- League: National League
- Division: Central
- Ballpark: Great American Ball Park
- City: Cincinnati, Ohio
- Record: 68–94 (.420)
- Divisional place: 5th
- Owners: Bob Castellini
- General managers: Dick Williams
- Managers: Bryan Price
- Television: Fox Sports Ohio (Thom Brennaman, Chris Welsh, Jim Kelch, George Grande, Jeff Brantley, Jim Day, Jeff Piecoro)
- Radio: WLW (700 AM); Reds Radio Network (Marty Brennaman, Jeff Brantley, Jim Kelch, Thom Brennaman, Doug Flynn)
- Stats: ESPN.com; Baseball Reference

The 2016 Cincinnati Reds season was the 147th season for the franchise in Major League Baseball, and their 14th at Great American Ball Park in Cincinnati. The Reds attempted to rebound from their 2015 season, but ultimately finished in last place in the National League Central for a second consecutive year. Their record was 68 wins and 94 losses, just four games better than 2015.

== Standings ==
=== National League Central ===
NL Central
Team	W	L	Pct.	GB	Home	Road
Chicago Cubs	103	58	.640	—	57‍–‍24	46‍–‍34
St. Louis Cardinals	86	76	.531	17½	38‍–‍43	48‍–‍33
Pittsburgh Pirates	78	83	.484	25	38‍–‍42	40‍–‍41
Milwaukee Brewers	73	89	.451	30½	41‍–‍40	32‍–‍49
Cincinnati Reds	68	94	.420	35½	38‍–‍43	30‍–‍51

=== National League Wildcard ===
Division leaders
Team	W	L	Pct.
Chicago Cubs	103	58	.640
Washington Nationals	95	67	.586
Los Angeles Dodgers	91	71	.562

Wild Card teams (Top 2 teams qualify for postseason)
Team	W	L	Pct.	GB
New York Mets	87	75	.537	—
San Francisco Giants	87	75	.537	—
St. Louis Cardinals	86	76	.531	1
Miami Marlins	79	82	.491	7½
Pittsburgh Pirates	78	83	.484	8½
Colorado Rockies	75	87	.463	12
Milwaukee Brewers	73	89	.451	14
Philadelphia Phillies	71	91	.438	16
Arizona Diamondbacks	69	93	.426	18
Atlanta Braves	68	93	.422	18½
San Diego Padres	68	94	.420	19
Cincinnati Reds	68	94	.420	19

=== Record vs. opponents ===
2016 National League record Source: MLB Standings Grid – 2016
Team	AZ	ATL	CHC	CIN	COL	LAD	MIA	MIL	NYM	PHI	PIT	SD	SF	STL	WSH	AL
Arizona	—	5–2	2–5	3–3	10–9	7–12	2–4	3–4	5–1	4–3	1–5	10–9	6–13	4–3	2–5	5–15
Atlanta	2–5	—	3–3	3–4	1–6	1–5	11–7	2–5	10–9	11–8	3–4	4–2	3–4	2–4	4–15	8–12
Chicago	5–2	3–3	—	15–4	2–4	4–3	4–3	11–8	2–5	5–1	14–4	4–2	4–3	10–9	5–2	15–5
Cincinnati	3–3	4–3	4–15	—	5–2	2–5	3–4	11–8	0–6	4–2	9–10	3–4	3–3	9–10	3–4	5–15
Colorado	9–10	6–1	4–2	2–5	—	7–12	2–5	1–5	6–1	2–5	2–5	10–9	9–10	2–4	4–2	9–11
Los Angeles	12–7	5–1	3–4	5–2	12–7	—	1–6	5–2	4–3	4–2	2–5	11–8	8–11	4–2	5–1	10–10
Miami	4–2	7–11	3–4	4–3	5–2	6–1	—	4–2	7–12	9–10	6–1	3–3	2–4	4–3	9–10	6–14
Milwaukee	4–3	5–2	8–11	8–11	5–1	2–5	2–4	—	2–5	3–4	9–10	3–4	1–5	6–13	4–2	11–9
New York	1–5	9–10	5–2	6–0	1–6	3–4	12–7	5–2	—	12–7	3–3	4–3	4–3	3–3	7–12	12–8
Philadelphia	3–4	8–11	1–5	2–4	5–2	2–4	10–9	4–3	7–12	—	3–4	5–2	3–3	2–5	5–14	11–9
Pittsburgh	5–1	4–3	4–14	10–9	5–2	5–2	1–6	10–9	3–3	4–3	—	3–3	4–3	9–10	2–4	9–11
San Diego	9–10	2–4	2–4	4–3	9–10	8–11	3–3	4–3	3–4	2–5	3–3	—	8–11	1–6	4–3	6–14
San Francisco	13–6	4–3	3–4	3–3	10–9	11–8	4–2	5–1	3–4	3–3	3–4	11–8	—	3–4	3–4	8–12
St. Louis	3–4	4–2	9–10	10–9	4–2	2–4	3–4	13–6	3–3	5–2	10–9	6–1	4–3	—	2–5	8–12
Washington	5–2	15–4	2–5	4–3	2–4	1–5	10–9	2–4	12–7	14–5	4–2	3–4	4–3	5–2	—	12–8

=== Regular season ===
Team	Home	Away	Total	Win %	Gms Left
National League East
Atlanta Braves	2–1	2–2	4–3	.571	0
Miami Marlins	3–1	0–3	3–4	.429	0
New York Mets	0–3	0–3	0–6	.000	0
Philadelphia Phillies	3–0	1–2	4–2	.667	0
Washington Nationals	2–1	1–3	3–4	.429	0
	9–7	5–13	14–19	.424	0
National League Central
Chicago Cubs	3–8	2–7	4–15	.211	0
Milwaukee Brewers	6–3	5–4	11–7	.611	0
Pittsburgh Pirates	4–5	5–5	9–10	.474	0
St. Louis Cardinals	5–4	4–6	9–10	.474	0
	17–20	16–22	33–42	.440	0
National League West
Arizona Diamondbacks	2–1	1–2	3–3	.500	0
Colorado Rockies	2–1	3–1	5–2	.714	0
Los Angeles Dodgers	2–2	0–3	2–5	.286	0
San Diego Padres	1–3	2–1	3–4	.400	0
San Francisco Giants	1–2	2–1	3–3	.500	0
	8–9	7–7	16–17	.485	0
American League
Cleveland Indians	0–2	0–2	0–4	.000	0
Houston Astros	N/A	1–2	1–2	.333	0
Los Angeles Angels of Anaheim	N/A	0–3	0–3	.000	0
Oakland Athletics	2–1	N/A	2–1	.667	0
Seattle Mariners	0–3	N/A	0–3	.000	0
Texas Rangers	1–1	1–1	2–2	.500	0
	3–5	2–10	5–15	.263	0

Month	Games	Won	Lost	Win %
April	24	9	15	.375
May	30	8	20	.286
June	28	12	16	.429
July	24	13	11	.542
August	28	13	15	.464
September	28	12	16	.429
October	2	1	1	.500
	162	68	94	.420

	Games	Won	Lost	Win %
Home	81	38	43	.469
Away	81	30	51	.370

- Most Runs Scored in a game: 13 (4/23 vs. CHC; 8/27 vs. ARI)
- Most Runs Allowed in a game: 18 (8/22 vs. LAD)
- Longest Winning Streak: 5 games (8/16–8/20; 9/9–9/13)
- Longest Losing Streak: 11 games (5/16–5/27)

== Regular season highlights ==
- The Reds' bullpen set a record by allowing a run in 23 consecutive games from April 10 to May 5. The previous record had been 20, set by the 2013 Colorado Rockies.
- The Reds gave up their 242nd home run on September 19. That is the most home runs allowed in a season by a team in Major League history. The 1996 Detroit Tigers held the previous mark with 241 home runs allowed. Prior to this game, Cincinnati had been tied for the high among National League clubs with the Colorado Rockies, who allowed 239 home runs in 2001.

Opening Day Starting Lineup

Position	Name
SS	Zack Cozart
3B	Eugenio Suárez
1B	Joey Votto
2B	Brandon Phillips
RF	Jay Bruce
C	Devin Mesoraco
LF	Adam Duvall
P	Raisel Iglesias
CF	Billy Hamilton

== Home attendance ==
Year	Attendance (games)	Avg/game	NL Rank	W-L
2016	1,894,085 (81)	23,384	14th of 15	38–43
2015	2,419,506 (81)	29,870	11th of 15	34–47
2014	2,476,664 (81)	30,576	8th of 15	44–37
2013	2,492,101 (81)	31,151	10th of 15	49–31

Highest Home Attendance: 4/4 vs. PHI (43,683)
Lowest Home Attendance: 4/7 vs. PHI (10,784)

== Game log ==
2016 Game Log: 68–94 (Home: 38–43; Away: 30–51)
April: 9–15 (Home: 8–5; Away: 1–10)

#	Date	Opponent	TV	Score	Win	Loss	Save	Attendance	Record	Box	Streak
1	April 4	Phillies	FSO	6–2	Ohlendorf (1–0)	Hernandez (0–1)	—	43,683	1–0		W1
2	April 6	Phillies	ESPN2/ FSO	3–2	Wood (1–0)	Hinojosa (0–1)	—	21,621	2–0		W2
3	April 7	Phillies	FSO	10–6	Stephenson (1–0)	Morton (0–1)	—	10,784	3–0		W3
4	April 8	Pirates	FSO	5–6	Vogelsong (1–0)	Hoover (0–1)	Melancon (2)	17,194	3–1		L1
5	April 9	Pirates	FSO	5–1	Iglesias (1–0)	Cole (0–1)	—	22,799	4–1		W1
6	April 10	Pirates	FSO	2–1	Ohlendorf (2–0)	Caminero (0–1)	—	27,207	5–1		W2
7	April 11	@ Cubs	FSO	3–5	Warren (1–0)	Cingrani (0–1)	Rondón (2)	40,882	5–2		L1
8	April 13	@ Cubs	FSO	2–9	Lackey (2–0)	Simón (0–1)	—	36,496	5–3		L2
9	April 14	@ Cubs	FSO	1–8	Hammel (1–0)	Iglesias (1–1)	—	34,898	5–4		L3
10	April 15	@ Cardinals	FSO	3–14	Martínez (2–0)	Melville (0–1)	—	44,997	5–5		L4
11	April 16	@ Cardinals	FSO	9–8	Finnegan (1–0)	Wainwright (0–2)	Hoover (1)	44,245	6–5		W1
12	April 17	@ Cardinals	FSO	3–4	Siegrist (1–0)	Ohlendorf (2–1)	Rosenthal (3)	46,268	6–6		L1
13	April 18	Rockies	FSO	1–5	Lyles (1–1)	Ohlendorf (2–2)	—	12,777	6–7		L2
14	April 19	Rockies	FSO	4–3	Stephenson (2–0)	De La Rosa (1–2)	—	13,240	7–7		W1
15	April 20	Rockies	MLBN	6–5	Ohlendorf (3–2)	Bergman (0–3)	—	12,989	8–7		W2
16	April 21	Cubs	FSO	0–16	Arrieta (4–0)	Finnegan (1–1)	—	16,497	8–8		L1
17	April 22	Cubs	FSO	1–8	Lester (2–1)	Moscot (0–1)	—	25,940	8–9		L2
18	April 23	Cubs	FSO	13–5	Wood (2–0)	Lackey (3–1)	—	41,660	9–9		W1
19	April 24	Cubs	FSO	0–9	Hammel (3–0)	Simón (0–2)	—	36,220	9–10		L1
20	April 25	@ Mets	FSO	3–5	Verrett (2–0)	Ramírez (0–1)	Familia (6)	30,250	9–11		L2
21	April 26	@ Mets	FSO/ MLBN	3–4	Verrett (3–0)	Cingrani (0–2)	Familia (7)	26,978	9–12		L3
22	April 27	@ Mets	FSO	2–5	Harvey (2–3)	Moscot (0–2)	Reed (1)	31,481	9–13		L4
23	April 29	@ Pirates	FSO	1–4	Nicasio (3–2)	Straily (0–1)	Melancon (6)	29,938	9–14		L5
24	April 30	@ Pirates	FSO	1–5	Liriano (2–1)	Simón (0–3)	Melancon (7)	34,810	9–15		L6

May: 8–20 (Home: 4–10; Away: 4–10)

#	Date	Opponent	TV	Score	Win	Loss	Save	Attendance	Record	Box	Streak
25	May 1	@ Pirates	FSO	6–5 (11)	Wood (3–0)	Vogelsong (1–1)	—	28,755	10–15		W1
26	May 2	Giants	FSO	6–9	Mazzaro (1–0)	Ramirez (0–2)	Casilla (5)	13,829	10–16		L1
27	May 3	Giants	FSO	1–3	Samardzija (1–0)	Cotham (0–1)	Casilla (6)	14,309	10–17		L2
28	May 4	Giants	MLBN	7–4	Straily (1–1)	Peavy (1–3)	—	21,333	11–17		W1
29	May 5	Brewers	FSO	9–5	Simón (1–3)	Anderson (1–4)	—	13,088	12–17		W2
30	May 6	Brewers	FSO	5–1	Adleman (1–0)	Cravy (0–1)	Cingrani (1)	28,249	13–17		W3
31	May 7	Brewers	FSO	7–13 (10)	Jeffress (1–0)	Cotham (0–2)	—	27,567	13–18		L1
32	May 8	Brewers	FSO	4–5	Capuano (1–0)	Ohlendorf (3–3)	Jeffress (8)	22,376	13–19		L2
33	May 9	Pirates	FSO	3–2	Ramírez (1–2)	Niese (3–2)	Cingrani (2)	12,103	14–19		W1
—	May 10	Pirates	Postponed (inclement weather) (Makeup date: September 17)								
34	May 11	Pirates	FSO	4–5	Watson (1–0)	Ohlendorf (3–4)	Melancon (10)	14,464	14–20		L1
35	May 13	@ Phillies	FSO	2–3	Hellickson (3–2)	Finnegan (1–2)	Gómez (14)	22,230	14–21		L2
36	May 14	@ Phillies	FSO	3–4	Nola (3–2)	Adleman (1–1)	Hernandez (1)	29,535	14–22		L3
37	May 15	@ Phillies	FSO	9–4	Straily (2–1)	Morgan (1–1)	Cingrani (3)	27,869	15–22		W1
38	May 16	@ Indians	FSO	6–14	Hunter (1–1)	Lamb (0–1)	—	12,184	15–23		L1
39	May 17	@ Indians	FSO	1–13	Salazar (4–2)	Simón (1–4)	—	13,095	15–24		L2
40	May 18	Indians	FSO	7–8 (12)	Allen (1–3)	Sampson (0–1)	Otero (1)	22,815	15–25		L3
41	May 19	Indians	FSO	2–7	Tomlin (6–0)	Cotham (0–3)	—	21,173	15–26		L4
42	May 20	Mariners	FSO	3–8	Iwakuma (2–4)	Wood (3–1)	—	20,435	15–27		L5
43	May 21	Mariners	FSO	0–4	Hernandez (4–3)	Lamb (0–2)	—	38,200	15–28		L6
44	May 22	Mariners	FSO	4–5	Miley (5–2)	Simón (1–5)	Cishek (12)	24,123	15–29		L7
45	May 23	@ Dodgers	FSO/ MLBN	0–1	Kershaw (7–1)	Finnegan (1–3)	—	42,519	15–30		L8
46	May 24	@ Dodgers	FSO	2–8	Bolsinger (1–1)	Wright (0–1)	—	42,278	15–31		L9
47	May 25	@ Dodgers	FSO	1–3	Kazmir (4–3)	Straily (2–2)	Jansen (14)	44,855	15–32		L10
48	May 27	@ Brewers	FSO	5–9	Davies (2–3)	Lamb (0–3)	—	20,441	15–33		L11
49	May 28	@ Brewers	FSO	7–6	Wood (4–1)	Jeffress (1–1)	Cingrani (4)	30,293	16–33		W1
50	May 29	@ Brewers	FSO	4–5	Nelson (5–3)	Finnegan (1–4)	Boyer (1)	34,901	16–34		L1
51	May 30	@ Rockies	FSO	11–8	Straily (3–2)	Bettis (4–4)	Ramirez (1)	30,608	17–34		W1
52	May 31	@ Rockies	FSO	4–17	Gray (3–2)	Moscot (0–3)	—	20,448	17–35		L1

June: 12–16 (Home: 6–10; Away: 6–6)

#	Date	Opponent	TV	Score	Win	Loss	Save	Attendance	Record	Box	Streak
53	June 1	@ Rockies	FSO	7–2	Lamb (1–3)	Chatwood (6–4)	—	23,612	18–35		W1
54	June 2	@ Rockies	FSO	11–4	Simón (2–5)	Butler (2–3)	—	28,080	19–35		W2
55	June 3	Nationals	FSO	7–2	Finnegan (2–4)	Gonzalez (3–4)	—	27,258	20–35		W3
56	June 4	Nationals	FSO	6–3	Ohlendorf (4–4)	Rivero (0–2)	Cingrani (5)	25,365	21–35		W4
57	June 5	Nationals	FSO	9–10	Solis (1–1)	Wright (0–2)	Papelbon (15)	21,422	21–36		L1
58	June 7	Cardinals	FSO	7–6	Cingrani (1–2)	Siegrist (4–1)	—	24,182	22–36		W1
59	June 8	Cardinals	FSO	7–12	Bowman (1–1)	Simón (2–6)	—	21,376	22–37		L1
60	June 9	Cardinals	FSO	2–3	Oh (2–0)	Ohlendorf (4–5)	Rosenthal (11)	24,516	22–38		L2
61	June 10	Athletics	FSO	2–1	Wood (5–1)	Gray (3–6)	Cingrani (6)	21,250	23–38		W1
62	June 11	Athletics	FSO	2–1	Straily (4–2)	Mengden (0–1)	Ohlendorf (1)	32,034	24–38		W2
63	June 12	Athletics	FSO	1–6	Rodriguez (4–2)	Lamb (1–4)	—	24,880	24–39		L1
64	June 13	@ Braves	FSO	9–8	Ohlendorf (5–5)	Vizcaino (1–2)	Cingrani (7)	13,198	25–39		W1
65	June 14	@ Braves	FSO	3–1	Finnegan (3–4)	Teheran (2–7)	Wood (1)	13,176	26–39		W2
66	June 15	@ Braves	FSO	8–9 (13)	Ogando (2–1)	Simón (2–7)	—	14,953	26–40		L1
67	June 16	@ Braves	FSO	2–7	Wisler (3–7)	Straily (4–3)	—	21,885	26–41		L2
68	June 17	@ Astros	FSO	4–2 (11)	Hoover (1–1)	Neshek (2–1)	Cingrani (8)	37,560	27–41		W1
69	June 18	@ Astros	FSO	4–5 (11)	Feldman (4–3)	Smith (0–1)	—	39,111	27–42		L1
70	June 19	@ Astros	FSO	0–6	Fiers (5–3)	Finnegan (3–5)	Devenski (1)	36,369	27–43		L2
71	June 21	@ Rangers	FSO	8–2	DeSclafani (1–0)	Lewis (6–1)	—	32,291	28–43		W1
72	June 22	@ Rangers	FSO	4–6	Hamels (8–1)	Straily (4–4)	Dyson (15)	32,407	28–44		L1
73	June 23	Padres	FSO	4–7	Friedrich (4–2)	Ramirez (1–3)	Rodney (16)	20,443	28–45		L2
74	June 24	Padres	FSO	4–13	Rea (4–3)	Reed (0–1)	—	40,713	28–46		L3
75	June 25	Padres	FS1	0–3	Pomeranz (7–7)	Finnegan (3–6)	Rodney (17)	40,871	28–47		L4
76	June 26	Padres	FSO	3–0	DeSclafani (2–0)	Perdomo (2–3)	Cingrani (9)	40,085	29–47		W1
77	June 27	Cubs	FSO	8–11	Arrieta (12–2)	Straily (4–5)	—	31,762	29–48		L1
78	June 28	Cubs	FSO	2–7 (15)	Patton (1–0)	Hoover (1–2)	—	35,999	29–49		L2
79	June 29	Cubs	MLBN	2–9	Hendricks (5–6)	Reed (0–2)	—	37,188	29–50		L3
80	June 30	@ Nationals	FSO	4–13	Gonzalez (4–7)	Finnegan (3–7)	—	29,386	29–51		L4

July: 13–11 (Home: 6–3; Away: 7–8)

#	Date	Opponent	TV	Score	Win	Loss	Save	Attendance	Record	Box	Streak
81	July 1	@ Nationals	FSO	2–3 (14)	Petit (3–1)	Ohlendorf (5–6)	—	27,631	29–52		L5
82	July 2	@ Nationals	FOX	9–4 (10)	Smith (1-1)	Solis (1–3)	—	35,195	30–52		W1
83	July 3	@ Nationals	FSO	1–12	Strasburg (11–0)	Lamb (1–5)	—	37,328	30–53		L1
84	July 4	@ Cubs	FSO	4–10	Hendricks (7–6)	Reed (0–3)	—	41,293	30–54		L2
85	July 5	@ Cubs	FSO	9–5	Finnegan (4–7)	Lackey (7–5)	—	41,310	31–54		W1
86	July 6	@ Cubs		5–3	DeSclafani (3–0)	Cahill (1–3)	Cingrani (10)	41,262	32–54		W2
87	July 8	@ Marlins	FSO	1–3	Fernandez (11–4)	Straily (4–6)	Ramos (26)	22,333	32–55		L1
88	July 9	@ Marlins	FSO	2–4	Conley (6–5)	Lamb (1–6)	Ramos (27)	23,653	32–56		L2
89	July 10	@ Marlins	FSO	3–7	Dunn (1–1)	Reed (0–4)	—	22,394	32–57		L3
87th All-Star Game in San Diego, California
90	July 15	Brewers	FSO	5–4	DeSclafani (4–0)	Garza (1–3)	Ohlendorf (2)	30,680	33–57		W1
91	July 16	Brewers	FSO	1–9	Nelson (6–7)	Lamb (1–7)	—	31,328	33–58		L1
92	July 17	Brewers	FSO	1–0	Cingrani (2–2)	Thornburg (3–3)	—	23,085	34–58		W1
93	July 18	Braves	FSO	8–2	Finnegan (5–7)	Wisler (4–9)	—	21,989	35–58		W2
94	July 19	Braves	FSO	4–5 (11)	Cabrera (1–0)	Cingrani (2–3)	—	23,080	35–59		L1
95	July 20	Braves	MLBN	6–3	DeSclafani (5–0)	Harrell (1–2)	—	22,091	36–59		W1
96	July 22	Diamondbacks	FSO	6–2	Straily (5–6)	Bradley (3–6)	—	24,252	37–59		W2
97	July 23	Diamondbacks	FSO	6–1	Lorenzen (1–0)	Ray (5–9)	—	23,963	38–59		W3
98	July 24	Diamondbacks	FSO	8–9	Godley (3–1)	Finnegan (5–8)	—	25,304	38–60		L1
99	July 25	@ Giants	FSO	7–5	DeSclafani (6–0)	Peavy (5–9)	Cingrani (11)	42,147	39–60		W1
100	July 26	@ Giants	FSO	7–9	Cain (2–6)	Reed (0–5)	Casilla (22)	41,896	39–61		L1
101	July 27	@ Giants	FSO	2–1	Straily (6–6)	Bumgarner (10–6)	Cingrani (12)	42,079	40–61		W1
102	July 29	@ Padres		6–0	Finnegan (6–8)	Jackson (1–2)	—	33,509	41–61	Archived August 14, 2016, at the Wayback Machine	W2
103	July 30	@ Padres	FSO	1–2	Hand (3–2)	Diaz (0–1)	—	31,620	41–62		L1
104	July 31	@ Padres	FSO	3–2	Bailey (1–0)	Clemens (1–2)	Cingrani (13)	27,346	42–62		W1

August: 13–15 (Home: 7–5; Away: 5–10)

#	Date	Opponent	TV	Score	Win	Loss	Save	Attendance	Record	Box	Streak
105	August 2	Cardinals	FS1	7–5	Diaz (1–1)	Oh (2–2)	—	25,270	43–62		W2
106	August 3	Cardinals	FSO	4–5	Wacha (7–7)	Reed (0–6)	Oh (8)	20,771	43–63		L1
107	August 4	Cardinals		7–0	Finnegan (7–8)	Leake (8–9)	—	21,119	44–63		W1
108	August 5	@ Pirates	FSO	2–3	Watson (2–3)	Ohlendorf (5–7)	—	28,882	44–64		L1
109	August 6	@ Pirates	FSO	3–5	Nova (8–6)	Bailey (1–1)	Watson (2)	34,259	44–65		L2
110	August 7	@ Pirates	FSO	7–3	Straily (7–6)	Cole (7–7)	—	32,947	45–65		W1
111	August 8	@ Cardinals	FSO	4–5	Maness (2–2)	Cingrani (2–4)	—	40,616	45–66		L1
112	August 9	@ Cardinals	FSO	7–4	Lorenzen (2–0)	Bowman (1–4)	Iglesias (1)	40,113	46–66		W1
113	August 10	@ Cardinals	FSO	2–3	García (9–8)	DeSclafani (6–1)	Oh (10)	40,019	46–67		L1
114	August 12	@ Brewers	FSO	7–4	Bailey (2–1)	Nelson (6–12)	—	24,553	47–67		W1
115	August 13	@ Brewers	FSO	11–5	Straily (8–6)	Davies (9–5)	—	30,357	48–-67		W2
116	August 14	@ Brewers	FSO	3–7	Peralta (5–8)	Reed (0–7)	—	30,103	48-68		L1
117	August 15	Marlins	FSO	3–6	Phelps (6–6)	Finnegan (7–9)	Rodney (21)	16,918	48–69		L2
118	August 16	Marlins	FSO	6–3	DeSclafani (7–1)	Ureña (1–4)	Cingrani (14)	14,440	49–69		W1
119	August 17	Marlins	FSO	3–2	Smith (2–1)	Wittgren (3–2)	Cingrani (15)	13,973	50–69		W2
120	August 18	Marlins	FSO	5–4	Straily (9–6)	Fernandez (12–7)	Iglesias (2)	14,108	51–69		W3
121	August 19	Dodgers	FSO	9–2	Adleman (2–1)	Norris (6–10)	—	28,184	52–69		W4
122	August 20	Dodgers	FSO	11–1	Finnegan (8–9)	Anderson (0–2)	—	29,735	53–69		W5
123	August 21	Dodgers	FSO	0–4	Urías (4–2)	DeSclafani (7–2)	—	28,752	53–70		L1
124	August 22	Dodgers		9–18	Chavez (2–2)	Bailey (2–2)	—	15,690	53–71		L2
125	August 23	Rangers	FSO	3–0	Straily (10–6)	Holland (5–6)	Cingrani (16)	16,668	54–71		W1
126	August 24	Rangers	FSO	5–6	Diekman (4–2)	Wood (5–2)	Dyson (28)	16,100	54–72		L1
127	August 26	@ Diamondbacks	FSO	3–4 (11)	Escobar (1–2)	Wood (5–3)	—	26,087	54–73		L2
128	August 27	@ Diamondbacks	FSO	13–0	DeSclafani (8–2)	Godley (4–3)	—	34,395	55–73		W1
129	August 28	@ Diamondbacks	FSO	2–11	Bradley (5–8)	Bailey (2–3)	—	22,624	55–74		L1
130	August 29	@ Angels		2–9	Shoemaker (9–13)	Straily (10–7)	—	34,161	55–75		L2
131	August 30	@ Angels	FSO	2–4	Weaver (10–11)	Adleman (2–2)	Salas (6)	33,042	55–76		L3
132	August 31	@ Angels	FSO	0–3	Nolasco (5–12)	Finnegan (8–10)	—	34,215	55–77		L4

September: 12–16 (Home: 5–9; Away: 7–7)

#	Date	Opponent	TV	Score	Win	Loss	Save	Attendance	Record	Box	Streak
133	September 2	Cardinals	FSO	3–2	Iglesias (2–1)	Oh (4–3)	—	21,441	56–77		W1
134	September 3	Cardinals	FSO	9–1	Straily (11–7)	Garcia (10–11)	—	31,118	57–77		W2
135	September 4	Cardinals	FSO	2–5	Martínez (13–7)	Adleman (2–3)	Oh (15)	26,985	57–78		L1
136	September 5	Mets	FSO	0–5	Colón (13–7)	Stephenson (2–1)	—	18,169	57–79		L2
137	September 6	Mets	FSO	3–5	Smoker (2–0)	Lorenzen (2–1)	Familia (46)	13,359	57–80		L3
138	September 7	Mets		3–6	Syndergaard (13–8)	DeSclafani (8–3)	Familia (47)	13,936	57–81		L4
139	September 8	@ Pirates	FSO	1–4	Nova (12–6)	Straily (11–8)	—	22,288	57–82		L5
140	September 9	@ Pirates	FSO	4–3	Iglesias (3–1)	Watson (2–5)	—	24,520	58–82		W1
141	September 10	@ Pirates	FSO	8–7	Smith (3–1)	Williams (1–1)	Cingrani (17)	25,918	59–82		W2
142	September 11	@ Pirates		8–0	Finnegan (9–10)	Vogelsong (3–5)	—	26,744	60–82		W3
143	September 12	Brewers	FSO	3–0	Wood (6–3)	Peralta (6–10)	Iglesias (3)	14,671	61–82		W4
144	September 13	Brewers	FSO	6–4	Straily (12–8)	Garza (5–7)	—	12,926	62–82		W5
145	September 14	Brewers	FSO	0–7	Guerra (9–3)	Adleman (2–4)	—	14,368	62–83		L1
146	September 16	Pirates	FSO	7–9 (10)	Bastardo (3–0)	Cingrani (2–5)	Watson (13)	20,238	62–84		L2
147	September 17	Pirates	FSO	4–10	Taillon (4–4)	DeSclafani (8–4)	LeBlanc (2)	17,226	62–85		L3
148	September 17	Pirates	FSO	3–7	Nicasio (10–6)	Finnegan (9–11)	—	24,397	62–86		L4
149	September 18	Pirates		7–4	Straily (13–8)	Nova (12–7)	—	19,597	63–86	Archived September 19, 2016, at the Wayback Machine	W1
150	September 19	@ Cubs	FSO	2–5	Hammel (15–9)	Wood (6–4)	Chapman (35)	39,251	63–87		L1
151	September 20	@ Cubs	FSO	1–6	Lester (18–4)	Smith (3–2)	—	40,586	63–88		L2
152	September 21	@ Cubs	FSO	2–9	Lackey (10–8)	Stephenson (2–2)	—	40,434	63–89		L3
153	September 23	@ Brewers	FSO	4–5	Suter (2–1)	DeSclafani (8–5)	Thornburg (13)	35,364	63–90	Archived September 27, 2016, at the Wayback Machine	L4
154	September 24	@ Brewers	FSO	6–1	Straily (14–8)	Jungmann (0–5)	—	31,398	64–90	Archived September 27, 2016, at the Wayback Machine	W1
155	September 25	@ Brewers		4–2	Finnegan (10–11)	Peralta (7–11)	Iglesias (4)	31,776	65–90	Archived September 27, 2016, at the Wayback Machine	W2
156	September 26	@ Cardinals	FSO	15–2	Adleman (3–4)	Garcia (10–13)	—	34,942	66–90		W3
157	September 27	@ Cardinals	FSO	5–12	Wainwright (13–9)	Stephenson (2–3)	—	34,286	66–91		L1
158	September 28	@ Cardinals	FSO	2–1	DeSclafani (9–5)	Leake (9–12)	Iglesias (5)	36,275	67–91		W1
159	September 29	@ Cardinals	FSO	3–4	Oh (6–3)	Wood (6–5)	—	38,830	67–92	Archived October 1, 2016, at the Wayback Machine	L1
160	September 30	Cubs	FSO	3–7	Buchanan (1–0)	Smith (3–3)	—	27,368	67–93		L2

October: (Home: 1–1; Away: 0–0)

#	Date	Opponent	TV	Score	Win	Loss	Save	Attendance	Record	Box	Streak
161	October 1	Cubs	FSO	7–4	Adleman (4–4)	Lester (19-5)	Iglesias (5)	30,970	68–93		W1
162	October 2	Cubs	FSO	4–7	Grimm (2–1)	Iglesias (3–2)	Edwards Jr. (2)	32,587	68–94	Archived October 5, 2016, at the Wayback Machine	L1

== Roster ==
2016 Cincinnati Reds
Roster
Pitchers: 68 Tim Adleman; 34 Homer Bailey; 52 Tony Cingrani; 54 Caleb Cotham; 56 Steve Delabar; 66 Abel De Los Santos; 28 Anthony DeSclafani; 50 Dayán Díaz; 70 Jumbo Díaz; 29 Brandon Finnegan; 53 Drew Hayes; 60 J. J. Hoover; 26 Raisel Iglesias; 47 John Lamb; 21 Michael Lorenzen; 60 Matt Magill; 62 A.J. Morris; 46 John Moscot; 61 Tim Melville; 27 Ross Ohlendorf; 53 Wandy Peralta; 66 J. C. Ramírez; 44 Cody Reed; 48 Keyvius Sampson; 31 Alfredo Simón; 73 Josh Smith; 41 Layne Somsen; 55 Robert Stephenson; 58 Dan Straily; 36 Blake Wood; 41 Daniel Wright	Catchers: 16 Tucker Barnhart; 37 Ramón Cabrera; 39 Devin Mesoraco; Infielders: 2 Zack Cozart; 3 Iván DeJesús; 61 Rafael Lopez; 15 Jordan Pacheco; 4 Brandon Phillips; 49 Tony Renda; 7 Eugenio Suárez; 19 Joey Votto	Outfielders: 32 Jay Bruce; 23 Adam Duvall; 6 Billy Hamilton; 40 Tyler Holt; 33 Hernán Iribarren; 67 Patrick Kivlehan; 9 José Peraza; 43 Scott Schebler; 51 Steve Selsky; 30 Kyle Waldrop	Manager: 38 Bryan Price; Coaches: 45 Freddie Benavides (first base/infield); 22 Billy Hatcher (third base/outfield); 87 Dustin Hughes (bullpen catcher); 64 Tony Jaramillo (assistant hitting); 57 Mack Jenkins (pitching); 59 Don Long (hitting); 56 Ted Power (assistant pitching/bullpen); 35 Jim Riggleman (bench); 72 Mike Stefanski (catching)

== Player stats ==
=== Batting ===
Updated as of October 2, 2016. Players in bold are on the active roster as of the 2022 MLB season.

Note: G = Games played; AB = At bats; R = Runs; H = Hits; 2B = Doubles; 3B = Triples; HR = Home runs; RBI = Runs batted in; Avg. = Batting average; OBP = On-base percentage; SLG = Slugging percentage; SB = Stolen bases

Player	G	AB	R	H	2B	3B	HR	RBI	AVG	OBP	SLG	SB
Tim Adleman	13	21	2	4	2	0	0	3	.190	.190	.286	0
Homer Bailey	6	10	0	1	0	0	0	0	.100	.182	.100	0
**Tucker Barnhart**	115	337	34	97	23	1	7	51	.257	.323	.379	1
Jay Bruce	97	370	60	98	22	6	25	80	.265	.316	.559	4
Ramón Cabrera	61	171	11	42	10	0	3	23	.246	.279	.357	1
Tony Cingrani	65	0	1	0	0	0	0	0	—	1.000	—	0
Zack Cozart	121	464	67	117	28	2	16	50	.252	.308	.425	4
Iván DeJesús, Jr.	104	221	21	56	10	0	1	20	.253	.311	.312	3
**Anthony DeSclafani**	20	41	0	5	1	0	0	1	.122	.143	.146	0
Jumbo Díaz	45	1	0	0	0	0	0	0	.000	.000	.000	0
**Adam Duvall**	150	552	85	133	31	6	33	103	.241	.297	.498	6
Brandon Finnegan	33	53	4	6	2	0	0	2	.113	.161	.151	0
Billy Hamilton	119	411	69	107	19	3	3	17	.260	.321	.343	58
Drew Hayes	6	1	0	0	0	0	0	0	.000	.000	.000	0
Tyler Holt	106	179	21	42	5	3	0	13	.235	.327	.296	4
**Raisel Iglesias**	37	11	0	1	0	0	0	0	.091	.091	.091	0
Hernán Iribarren	24	45	6	14	0	3	0	2	.311	.311	.444	1
Patrick Kivlehan	3	5	0	0	0	0	0	0	.000	.000	.000	0
John Lamb	14	20	0	1	0	0	0	1	.050	.095	.050	0
Rafael Lopez	8	7	0	0	0	0	0	0	.000	.000	.000	0
**Michael Lorenzen**	36	5	1	1	0	0	1	3	.200	.200	.800	0
Tim Melville	3	2	0	0	0	0	0	0	.000	.000	.000	0
Devin Mesoraco	16	50	2	7	1	0	0	1	.140	.218	.160	0
A.J. Morris	7	1	0	0	0	0	0	0	.000	.000	.000	0
Jon Moscot	5	4	0	0	0	0	0	0	.000	.200	.000	0
Jordan Pacheco	31	51	1	8	4	0	0	0	.157	.157	.235	0
José Peraza	72	241	25	78	8	2	3	25	.324	.252	.411	21
Brandon Phillips	141	550	74	160	34	1	11	64	.291	.320	.416	14
Cody Reed	10	11	1	0	0	0	0	0	.000	.083	.000	0
Tony Renda	32	60	4	11	2	0	0	3	.183	.246	.217	0
Keyvius Sampson	18	7	0	0	0	0	0	0	.000	.000	.000	0
Scott Schebler	82	257	36	68	12	2	9	40	.265	.330	.471	2
Steve Selsky	24	51	9	16	2	0	2	7	.314	.340	.471	1
Alfredo Simón	15	14	0	1	0	0	0	1	.071	.188	.071	0
Josh Smith	33	11	0	2	1	0	0	0	.182	.182	.273	0
Robert Stephenson	8	10	0	0	0	0	0	0	.000	.000	.000	0
Dan Straily	34	52	2	1	0	0	0	1	.019	.056	.019	0
**Eugenio Suárez**	159	565	78	140	25	2	21	70	.248	.317	.411	11
**Joey Votto**	158	556	101	181	34	2	29	97	.326	.434	.550	8
Kyle Waldrop	15	22	1	5	1	0	0	1	.227	.261	.273	0
Blake Wood	70	2	0	0	0	0	0	0	.000	.000	.000	0
Daniel Wright	4	5	0	0	0	0	0	0	.000	.000	.000	0
**Team totals**	**162**	**5487**	**716**	**1403**	**277**	**33**	**164**	**678**	**.256**	**.316**	**.408**	**139**

=== Pitching ===
Updated as of October 2, 2016. Players in bold are on the active roster as of the 2022 MLB season.

Note: W = Wins; L = Losses; ERA = Earned run average; G = Games pitched; GS = Games started; SV = Saves; IP = Innings pitched; H = Hits allowed; R = Runs allowed; ER = Earned runs allowed; BB = Walks allowed; K = Strikeouts

Player	W	L	ERA	G	GS	SV	IP	H	R	ER	BB	K
Tim Adleman	4	4	4.00	13	13	0	69.2	64	32	31	20	47
Homer Bailey	2	3	6.65	6	6	0	23.0	35	19	17	7	27
Tony Cingrani	2	5	4.14	65	0	17	63.0	54	30	29	37	49
Caleb Cotham	0	3	7.40	23	0	0	24.1	32	21	20	12	21
Steve Delabar	0	0	6.75	7	0	0	8.0	5	6	6	10	10
Abel De Los Santos	0	0	11.12	5	0	0	5.2	7	7	7	4	2
**Anthony DeSclafani**	9	5	3.28	20	20	0	123.1	120	51	45	30	105
Dayán Díaz	0	0	9.45	6	0	0	6.2	10	9	7	7	3
Jumbo Díaz	1	1	3.14	45	0	0	43.0	36	20	15	19	37
Brandon Finnegan	10	11	3.98	31	31	0	172.0	150	86	76	84	145
Drew Hayes	0	0	8.38	6	0	0	9.2	15	10	9	6	8
Tyler Holt	0	0	0.00	1	0	0	1.0	0	0	0	0	0
J. J. Hoover	1	2	13.50	18	0	1	18.2	29	29	28	12	15
**Raisel Iglesias**	3	2	2.53	37	5	6	78.1	63	22	22	26	83
John Lamb	1	7	6.43	14	14	0	70.0	84	54	50	31	58
**Michael Lorenzen**	2	1	2.88	35	0	0	50.0	41	16	16	13	48
Matt Magill	0	0	6.23	5	0	0	4.1	5	3	3	0	1
Tim Melville	0	1	11.00	3	2	0	9.0	16	12	11	9	8
A. J. Morris	0	0	6.30	7	0	0	10.0	9	7	7	8	9
Jon Moscot	0	3	8.02	5	5	0	21.1	26	22	19	10	10
Ross Ohlendorf	5	7	4.66	64	0	2	65.2	59	35	34	32	68
**Wandy Peralta**	0	0	8.59	10	0	0	7.1	11	7	7	7	5
J. C. Ramírez	1	3	6.40	27	0	1	32.1	35	24	23	9	28
Cody Reed	0	7	7.36	10	10	0	47.2	67	47	39	19	43
Keyvius Sampson	0	1	4.35	18	2	0	39.1	40	24	19	27	42
Alfredo Simón	2	7	9.36	15	11	0	58.2	89	64	61	31	39
Josh Smith	3	3	4.68	32	2	0	59.2	57	32	31	26	48
Layne Somsen	0	0	19.29	2	0	0	2.1	6	5	5	3	2
**Robert Stephenson**	2	3	6.08	8	8	0	37.0	41	26	25	19	31
Dan Straily	14	8	3.76	34	26	0	191.1	154	80	80	73	162
Blake Wood	6	5	3.99	70	0	1	76.2	72	38	34	38	81
Daniel Wright	0	2	7.62	4	2	0	13.0	25	16	11	2	6
**Team totals**	**68**	**94**	**4.91**	**162**	**162**	**28**	**1442.0**	**1457**	**854**	**786**	**636**	**1241**

== Farm system ==
Level	Team	League	Manager
AAA	Louisville Bats	International League	Delino DeShields
AA	Pensacola Blue Wahoos	Southern League	Pat Kelly
A-Advanced	Daytona Tortugas	Florida State League	Eli Marrero
A	Dayton Dragons	Midwest League	Dick Schofield
Rookie	Billings Mustangs	Pioneer League	Ray Martinez
Rookie	AZL Reds	Arizona League	José Nieves
Rookie	DSL Reds	Dominican Summer League	Luis Saturria
Rookie	DSL Rojos	Dominican Summer League	José Castro

http://www.milb.com/milb/standings/
