= Donnie Ecker =

American baseball coach (born 1986)

Baltimore Orioles – No. 53
- Infielder / Coach
- Born: March 9, 1986 (age 40); Bakersfield, California, U.S.
- Bats: Left Throws: Right
- Stats at Baseball Reference

Teams
- As coach: Cincinnati Reds (2019); San Francisco Giants (2020–2021); Texas Rangers (2022–2025); Baltimore Orioles (2026–present)

Career highlights and awards
- World Series champion (2023)

Donald Joseph Ecker (born March 9, 1986) is an American professional baseball coach and former infielder who currently serves as the bench coach for the Baltimore Orioles of Major League Baseball (MLB). He played college baseball for California State University, Long Beach and Lewis–Clark State College. The Texas Rangers selected Ecker in the 22nd round of the 2007 MLB draft. He has coached in MLB for the Cincinnati Reds, San Francisco Giants, and the Rangers, with whom he won the 2023 World Series.

== Early life ==
Ecker graduated from Los Altos High School in Los Altos, California, in 2004. He played baseball and football at Los Altos, and received an athletic scholarship to the University of Nevada for football. The Cincinnati Reds of Major League Baseball (MLB) selected him in the 28th round of the 2004 MLB draft. Though Ecker did not sign with the Reds, he opted to focus on baseball.

== College career ==
He enrolled at California State University, Long Beach and played college baseball for the Long Beach State Dirtbags as a freshman, for whom he was 2-for-12 with a double in 2006. He transferred to Lewis–Clark State College in Idaho and continued his college career for the Lewis–Clark State Warriors, for whom he was 1-for-7 in 2007.

== Playing career ==
The Texas Rangers selected Ecker in the 22nd round of the 2007 MLB draft. He played in the Rangers organization in 2007 and 2008, batting .268/.360/.371 in 97 at bats for the Rookie-level Arizona League Rangers and the Low-A Spokane Indians. He then played in the Frontier League, an independent baseball league, batting .291/.391/.401 in 172 at-bats in 2010 in Illinois for the Windy City Thunderbolts and the Gateway Grizzlies. He retired as a player prior to the 2011 season.

== Coaching career ==
=== Amateur ===
Ecker coached baseball at Los Altos High School, first as an assistant for two years, and then as coach for two years from 2013-14. Bakersfield College hired him as an assistant coach in 2014.

In addition to coaching at Los Altos High School, Ecker coached at the prestigious college development amateur baseball program California Club Baseball (CCB) from 2011-2014. During his time with CCB, Ecker helped lead his teams to three COLT World Series titles along with mentor future major league players Kris Bubic, James Outman, and Trevor Larnach.

=== St. Louis Cardinals ===
In 2015, the St. Louis Cardinals of MLB hired Ecker to work in player development, a position he held for three years. In 2015 and 2016, he served as the hitting coach for the High-A Palm Beach Cardinals, and later served as the hitting coach for the High-A Peoria Chiefs in 2017.

=== Los Angeles Angels ===
In 2018 Ecker was the hitting coach for the Los Angeles Angels' Triple-A affiliate, the Salt Lake Bees.

=== Cincinnati Reds ===
The Cincinnati Reds hired Ecker as their assistant hitting coach on November 19, 2018. The Reds added the title director of hitting to Ecker's responsibilities following the 2019 season.

=== San Francisco Giants ===
The San Francisco Giants hired Ecker as one of their two major league hitting coaches prior to the 2020 season.

=== Texas Rangers ===
The Texas Rangers hired Ecker as their bench coach and offensive coordinator on November 1, 2021. He spent the 2022-2024 seasons in that role. Prior to the 2025 season, Texas removed his bench coach duties for him to focus solely on the offense. On May 4, 2025 the Texas Rangers dismissed Ecker from the organization.

=== Baltimore Orioles ===
On November 12, 2025, the Baltimore Orioles hired Ecker to serve as their bench coach under new manager Craig Albernaz.

Sporting positions
Preceded by Tony Jaramillo	Cincinnati Reds assistant hitting coach 2019	Succeeded by Joe Mather
Preceded by Rick Schu	San Francisco Giants assistant hitting coach 2020-2021	Succeeded by Pedro Guerrero
Preceded by Don Wakamatsu	Texas Rangers bench coach 2022-2024	Succeeded by Luis Urueta
Preceded by Tim Hyers	Texas Rangers hitting coach 2022-2025	Succeeded by Bret Boone
