= Tony Renda =

American baseball player (born 1991)

- Infielder
- Born: January 24, 1991 (age 35); Santa Rosa, California, U.S.
- Batted: Right Threw: Right

MLB debut
- August 2, 2016, for the Cincinnati Reds

Last MLB appearance
- August 5, 2018, for the Boston Red Sox

MLB statistics
- Batting average: .183
- Home runs: 0
- Runs batted in: 3
- Stats at Baseball Reference

Teams
- Cincinnati Reds (2016); Boston Red Sox (2018)

Anthony John Renda (born January 24, 1991) is an American former professional baseball second baseman who played in Major League Baseball (MLB) for the Cincinnati Reds and the Boston Red Sox. Before his professional career, he attended the University of California, Berkeley, and played college baseball for the California Golden Bears.

== Early life ==
Renda attended Junípero Serra High School in San Mateo, California, where he played for the school's baseball team. In three seasons on the varsity team, Renda recorded 139 hits, breaking former Major League Baseball player Gregg Jeffries' school record. He was named a High School All-American.

== College career ==
He began his collegiate career as a third baseman, but transitioned into a second baseman. In 2011, Renda won the Pacific-10 Conference Player of the Year Award.

== Professional career ==
=== Washington Nationals ===
==== Minor leagues ====
The Los Angeles Dodgers selected Renda in the 42nd round of the 2009 MLB draft. Renda did not sign, as he followed through on his commitment to enroll at the University of California, Berkeley, to play college baseball for the California Golden Bears baseball team. After Renda's junior year at California, the Washington Nationals selected Renda in the second round of the 2012 MLB draft. Renda signed with the Nationals, receiving a $500,000 signing bonus.

Renda made his professional debut with the Auburn Doubledays of the Low–A New York–Penn League in 2012. He played 71 games for Auburn. In 2013, Renda played for the Hagerstown Suns of the Single–A South Atlantic League, where he had a .294 batting average, 99 runs scored, 51 runs batted in, and 30 stolen bases in 135 games. His 43 doubles with Hagerstown were the second-most in all of Minor League Baseball. After the season, he won the inaugural Bob Boone Award for his "professionalism, leadership, loyalty, passion, selflessness, durability, makeup, intangibles and tremendous work ethic." In 2014, Renda played for the Potomac Nationals of the High–A Carolina League. After the season, the Nationals assigned Renda to the Mesa Solar Sox of the Arizona Fall League (AFL). He was named to the AFL's All-Star Game and Top Prospects Team.

Renda began the 2015 season with the Harrisburg Senators of the Double-A Eastern League, where he hit .267 through 54 games.

=== New York Yankees ===
On June 11, 2015, the Nationals traded Renda to the New York Yankees in exchange for David Carpenter. The Yankees assigned Renda to the Double–A Trenton Thunder of the Eastern League. Renda played 73 games for Trenton, batting .270 with two home runs and 21 RBI.

=== Cincinnati Reds ===
On December 28, 2015, the Yankees traded Renda, Caleb Cotham, Eric Jagielo, and Rookie Davis to the Cincinnati Reds in exchange for Aroldis Chapman. Renda began the 2016 season with the Pensacola Blue Wahoos of the Double-A Southern League, and received a promotion to the Louisville Bats of the Triple-A International League in June. He batted .326 in Double-A, and .276 in Triple-A.

==== Major leagues ====
The Reds promoted Renda to the major leagues for the first time on August 2. He made his major league debut that day, and got his first major league hit in his first at bat off Jonathan Broxton of the St. Louis Cardinals, an infield bunt single. The hit was first recorded as a sacrifice bunt and error, but was changed to a hit several days later. Overall, with the 2016 Reds, Renda appeared in 32 games, batting .183 (11-for-60) with three RBI.

Renda began the 2017 season with Triple-A Louisville, appearing in 51 games with a .260 average.

=== Arizona Diamondbacks ===
On July 3, 2017, the Reds traded Renda to the Arizona Diamondbacks in exchange for a player to be named later. He was assigned to the Reno Aces of the Triple-A Pacific Coast League, batting .185 (5-for-27) in eight games, spending mid-July though late September on the disabled list. Renda was released prior to the 2018 season.

=== Boston Red Sox ===
On April 30, 2018, Renda signed a minor league contract with the Boston Red Sox. He was assigned to the Double-A Portland Sea Dogs where he hit .371 in 26 games; he was promoted to the Triple-A Pawtucket Red Sox in mid-July. Renda was called up to Boston on August 4, after Ian Kinsler was placed on the 10-day disabled list and Dustin Pedroia was moved to the 60-day disabled list, opening a spot on the 40-man roster for Renda. In an August 5 game against the rival New York Yankees, Renda pinch ran and scored the winning run in a 5–4 Red Sox comeback, driven in on a single by Andrew Benintendi in the 10th inning. Renda was optioned back to Triple-A on August 8, without making another appearance. Renda was outrighted to the minors on November 1, removing him from the 40-man roster; he elected free agency on November 2. Renda became a 2018 World Series champion following Boston's victory over the Los Angeles Dodgers.

On November 29, 2018, Renda re-signed with the Red Sox on a minor league contract. He started the 2019 season with Triple-A Pawtucket, batting .200 (4-for-20) in five games. He was placed on the injured list in mid-April with a right shoulder strain, and missed the rest of the season. Renda elected free agency following the season on November 4, 2019.

== Personal life ==
Renda was born in Santa Rosa, California, and grew up in Hillsborough, California. His mother, Larree, began a career at Safeway, Inc. as a bagger, and worked her way up into an executive position. His father, Frank, a construction worker, died at age 56, when Renda was 19.
