= Rudy Jaramillo =

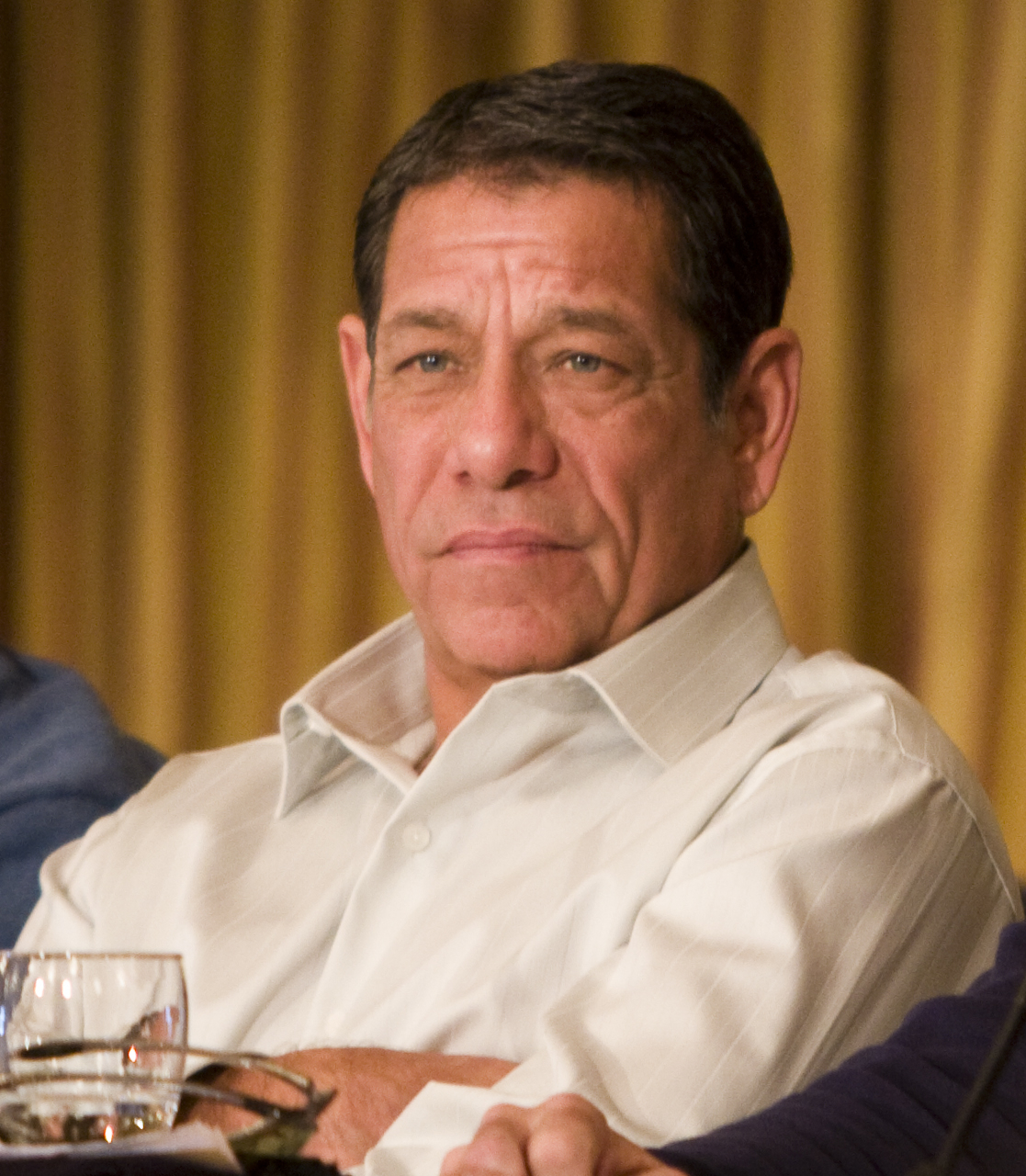
- Jaramillo in 2011
- Coach
- Born: September 20, 1950 (age 76); Beeville, Texas, U.S.
- Bats: Left Throws: Right
- Stats at Baseball Reference

Teams
- As coach: Houston Astros (1990–1993); Texas Rangers (1995–2009); Chicago Cubs (2010–2012)

Rudolpho Jaramillo [ha-dah-MEE-yoh] (born September 20, 1950) is an American professional baseball coach and former player. Jaramillo graduated from Dallas's Sunset High School in 1970 and attended the University of Texas at Austin. He is best known for being a hitting coach at the major league level, most recently for the Chicago Cubs. During his time with the Texas Rangers, Jaramillo was the first individual in Rangers history to serve more than eight seasons on their major league coaching staff. He served as the Rangers' major league hitting coach for 15 seasons, from 1995 to 2009. Jaramillo also had the longest tenure with one team as a hitting coach in Major League Baseball (MLB). Jaramillo has been credited for the development of players such as Jeff Bagwell, Juan González, Adrián González, Iván Rodríguez, Mark Teixeira, and Michael Young, among others.

== Playing career ==
Before his coaching career, Jaramillo was a minor league outfielder from 1973 through 1976. He batted left-handed and threw right-handed. Jaramillo played four minor league seasons for the Rangers, but he never reached the major league level as a player.

== Coaching career ==
Jaramillo started his minor league coaching career in 1983 and served as a manager in the minors from 1984 to 1986. He then became a minor league roving hitting instructor and worked in that capacity through the 1989 season. In 1990, Jaramillo joined the Houston Astros coaching staff after Art Howe was named the team manager. From 1990 through the 1993 season, Jaramillo was the Astros' major league batting coach, where offensive records were consistently broken each year, and Jeff Bagwell earned Rookie of the Year in 1991. He served as manager of the Bend Rockies for one season in 1994.

Prior to the 1995 season, Jaramillo was named as the Texas Rangers' major league hitting coach. From 1996 through the end of the 2004 season, the Rangers ranked in the top five in the American League in team batting average, runs scored, slugging percentage, home runs, and hits. In 1999, the Rangers led all of MLB in hits, slugging percentage, and team batting average (.293 for the season). In 2005, the Rangers hit 260 home runs, the second-highest total in MLB history. In 2008, the Rangers were first in runs scored (901), hits (1619), and home runs (194). During his time with Texas, his hitters won 17 Silver Slugger Awards, four MVP Awards, three home run titles, two RBI championships, and a batting title. Jaramillo also guided the Rangers to 13-consecutive seasons in which the offense recorded more than 800 runs scored, the longest streak by any major league team since the New York Yankees accomplished the feat in 17-straight seasons from 1926-42.

When the New York Mets were in search of a new major league manager in 2004, General Manager Omar Minaya interviewed Jaramillo as a possible managerial candidate. Jaramillo was among the final two candidates for the position, but Willie Randolph was ultimately selected as manager.

Following the 2009 season, Jaramillo announced that he would not remain with the Rangers, opting to seek out other opportunities. He officially signed with the Cubs on October 21, 2009, as their major league hitting coach. While Jaramillo was credited with the development of young Cubs phenom Starlin Castro. He was dismissed by the team on June 12, 2012.

== Honors ==
In 2003, Jaramillo was inducted into the Texas Baseball Hall of Fame. He was the 2004 recipient of the Texas Rangers' Joe Macko Award, given to honor his long and meritorious service to the organization. In 2005, Baseball America named Jaramillo Major League Coach of the Year. He was awarded with the Hispanic Heritage Baseball Museum Hall of Fame Pioneer Award at Rangers Ballpark in Arlington, Texas, on September 19, 2008. He was selected to the DISD Athletics Hall of Fame and is a Member of the Sunset High School Hall of Fame.

== Personal life ==
Rudy's nephew, Tony Jaramillo, is also a hitting coach.
