= Josh Smith (right-handed pitcher) =

American baseball player (born 1987)

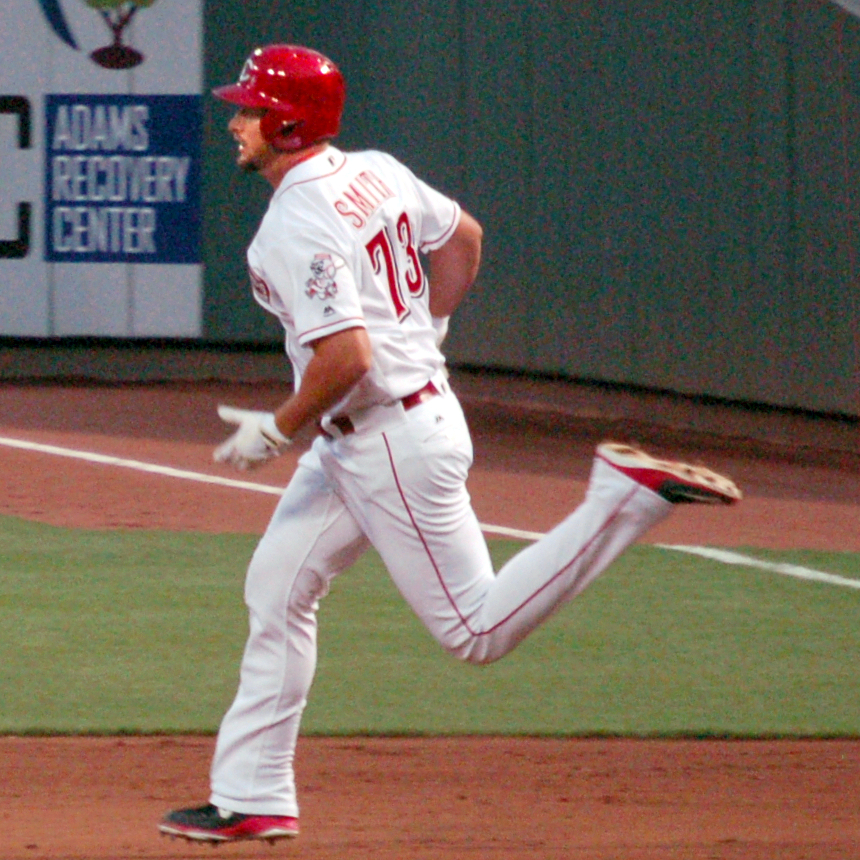
- Smith playing for the Cincinnati Reds in 2016
- Pitcher
- Born: August 7, 1987 (age 38); Margate, Florida, U.S.
- Batted: Right Threw: Right

Professional debut
- MLB: June 23, 2015, for the Cincinnati Reds
- KBO: April 7, 2021, for the Kiwoom Heroes

Last appearance
- MLB: September 23, 2020, for the Miami Marlins
- KBO: April 13, 2021, for the Kiwoom Heroes

MLB statistics
- Win–loss record: 6–12
- Earned run average: 5.60
- Strikeouts: 150

KBO statistics
- Win–loss record: 1–0
- Earned run average: 6.30
- Strikeouts: 5
- Stats at Baseball Reference

Teams
- Cincinnati Reds (2015–2016); Oakland Athletics (2017); Boston Red Sox (2019); Miami Marlins (2020); Kiwoom Heroes (2021)

Joshua Allen Smith (born August 7, 1987) is an American former professional baseball pitcher. He played in Major League Baseball (MLB) for the Cincinnati Reds, Oakland Athletics, Boston Red Sox and Miami Marlins. He also played in the KBO League for the Kiwoom Heroes. Listed at 6 feet 2 inches (1.88 m) and 220 pounds (100 kg), he bats and throws right-handed.

== Career ==
=== Cincinnati Reds ===
Smith was selected by the Cincinnati Reds in the 21st round of the 2010 MLB draft out of Lipscomb University. He rose through the Reds' minor league system, reaching Triple-A in 2014. In 2015, Smith was called up to the majors for the first time on April 13, but did not make his MLB debut until June 23, allowing four runs in three innings of a no decision against the Pittsburgh Pirates. He made nine appearances (seven starts) with the Reds in 2015, compiling an 0–4 record with 6.89 ERA. In 2016, Smith made 32 appearances (two starts) with the Reds, pitching to a 3–3 record with a 4.68 ERA. He also spent time in the minor leagues during 2015 and 2016.

=== Oakland Athletics ===
On November 4, 2016, Smith was claimed off waivers by the Oakland Athletics.

In 2017, Smith began the season with the Triple-A Nashville Sounds, until the Athletics purchased his contract on May 3, adding him to their active roster. With the A's during 2017, Smith made 26 relief appearances, recording a 4.89 ERA and a record of 2–1. He was outrighted to Triple-A on November 5, 2017, and then elected to become a free agent.

=== Seattle Mariners ===
On March 15, 2018, Smith signed a minor league contract with the Seattle Mariners. He made four appearances with the Tacoma Rainiers of the Pacific Coast League, recording a 6.10 ERA, and was released on April 21, 2018.

=== Boston Red Sox ===
On May 16, 2018, Smith signed a minor league contract with the Boston Red Sox. He joined the Triple-A Pawtucket Red Sox in June, appearing in 18 games (10 starts) with a 5–6 record and 4.14 ERA. Smith started the 2019 season with Pawtucket. He was added to Boston's active roster on April 26 to make a spot-start against the Tampa Bay Rays; however, the game was rained out. Smith made his Red Sox debut on May 3, pitching a scoreless inning against the Chicago White Sox. He next made a spot start against the Baltimore Orioles on May 6, taking the loss while allowing four runs in 3 1/3 innings. Smith was returned to Pawtucket on May 20, when David Price was activated from the injured list. Smith was optioned between Pawtucket and Boston several times during June; he recorded his first MLB save on June 13, against the Texas Rangers. After spending all of July with Pawtucket, Smith was recalled to Boston on August 2, when Heath Hembree was placed on the injured list. Smith was optioned back to Pawtucket two days later, and recalled to Boston on August 20. Overall with the 2019 Red Sox, Smith appeared in 18 games (two starts), compiling an 0–3 record with one save, along with a 5.81 ERA and 29 strikeouts in 31 innings. Smith was removed from Boston's 40-man roster in October and sent outright to Pawtucket. On October 21, he elected to become a free agent.

=== Miami Marlins ===
On December 18, 2019, Smith signed a minor league contract with the Miami Marlins. On August 3, 2020, Smith was selected to the active roster. On October 29, 2020, Smith was outrighted off of the 40-man roster.

=== Kiwoom Heroes ===
On December 11, 2020, Smith signed with the Kiwoom Heroes of the KBO League. On April 15, 2021, he was waived after posting a 6.30 ERA and 1.40 WHIP over two starts.

=== Miami Marlins (second stint) ===
On April 27, 2021, Smith signed a minor league contract with the Miami Marlins. Smith played in 9 games between the Florida Complex League Marlins and the Triple-A Jacksonville Jumbo Shrimp, registering a 2–0 record and 2.60 ERA. On July 22, Smith was released by the Marlins organization.

=== Algodoneros de Unión Laguna ===
On June 21, 2022, Smith signed with the Algodoneros de Unión Laguna of the Mexican League. In 8 starts for the team, he recorded a 3.66 ERA with 25 strikeouts across 39 1/3 innings pitched. Smith was released on April 19, 2023.

== Personal ==
Smith is often referred to online and in print as Josh A. Smith, to differentiate him from Josh D. Smith, especially since the two players were teammates for the Pawtucket Red Sox in 2018. The two were also teammates for the Miami Marlins in 2020.
