= Blake Wood =

American baseball player (born 1985)

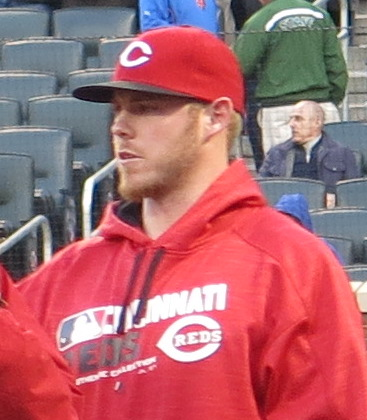
- Wood with the Reds in 2016
- Pitcher
- Born: August 8, 1985 (age 40); Atlanta, Georgia, U.S.
- Batted: Right Threw: Right

MLB debut
- May 12, 2010, for the Kansas City Royals

Last MLB appearance
- April 21, 2018, for the Los Angeles Angels

MLB statistics
- Win–loss record: 16–16
- Earned run average: 4.47
- Strikeouts: 276
- Stats at Baseball Reference

Teams
- Kansas City Royals (2010–2011); Cleveland Indians (2013–2014); Cincinnati Reds (2016–2017); Los Angeles Angels (2017–2018)

Blake Daniel Wood (born August 8, 1985) is an American former professional baseball pitcher. He played in Major League Baseball (MLB) for the Kansas City Royals, Cleveland Indians, Cincinnati Reds and Los Angeles Angels.

== Early life ==
Prior to playing professionally, he attended North Gwinnett High School and then Georgia Tech. In the summer of 2004, Wood pitched in the Alaska Baseball League for the Anchorage Bucs, and in the summer of 2005 played collegiate summer baseball in the Cape Cod Baseball League for the Yarmouth-Dennis Red Sox.

== Professional career ==
=== Kansas City Royals ===
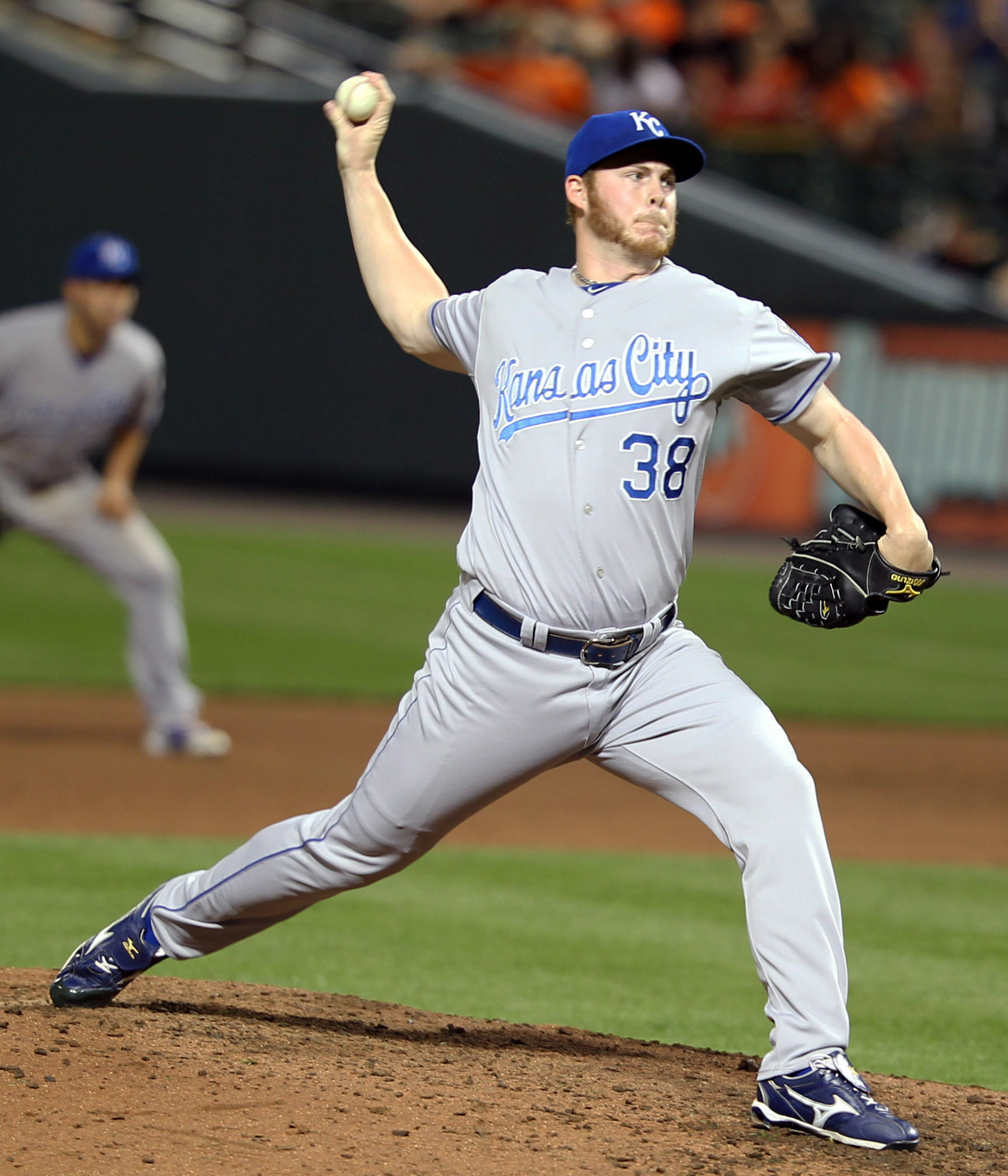
Wood, during his tenure with the Kansas City Royals, in 2011

Wood was drafted in the third round of the 2006 Major League Baseball draft by the Royals, and he began his professional career that season. Playing for the Idaho Falls Chukars, he went 3-1 with a 4.50 ERA in 12 starts.

He pitched for three teams in 2007 - the AZL Royals (0-0, 0.00 ERA in four starts), the Burlington Bees (2-1, 3.03 ERA in seven starts) and the Wilmington Blue Rocks (0-1, 4.66 ERA in two starts) - going a combined 2-2 with a 2.78 ERA in 13 starts.

In 2008, Wood pitched for the Blue Rocks (3-2, 2.67 ERA in 10 starts) and Northwest Arkansas Naturals (5-7, 5.30 ERA in 18 starts), going a combined 8-9 with a 4.25 ERA in 28 starts. In 144 innings, he allowed only 128 hits.

Though he spent three games (two starts) with the AZL Royals in 2009, he spent most of the season with the Naturals, going 2-8 with a 5.83 ERA in 17 games (13 starts) with them. Overall, he went 2-9 with a 5.55 ERA in 2009.

Wood made his MLB debut for the Royals on May 12, 2010. Wood went 6-6 with a 4.30 ERA in 106 appearances in two seasons with the Royals.

On May 18, 2012, it was announced that Wood's 2012 season has ended due to a torn UCL in his right elbow, requiring Tommy John surgery.

=== Cleveland Indians ===
On November 2, 2012, Wood was claimed off waivers by the Cleveland Indians. Wood was activated from the 60-day disabled list on July 14, 2013, and optioned to the Triple-A Columbus Clippers.

On December 2, 2013, Wood signed a one-year Major League deal for 2014 with the Indians, avoiding arbitration.

On May 26, 2014 the Indians designated Wood for assignment.

=== Kansas City Royals (second stint) ===
On June 2, 2014, Wood was claimed off waivers by the Kansas City Royals. He was designated for assignment on September 1, following the promotions of Carlos Peguero and Brandon Finnegan. Wood cleared waivers and was sent outright to the Triple-A Omaha Storm Chasers on September 9. Wood elected free agency in October.

=== Pittsburgh Pirates ===
Wood signed a minor league contract with the Pittsburgh Pirates on November 18, 2014. He was named a Triple-A All-Star with the Indianapolis Indians.

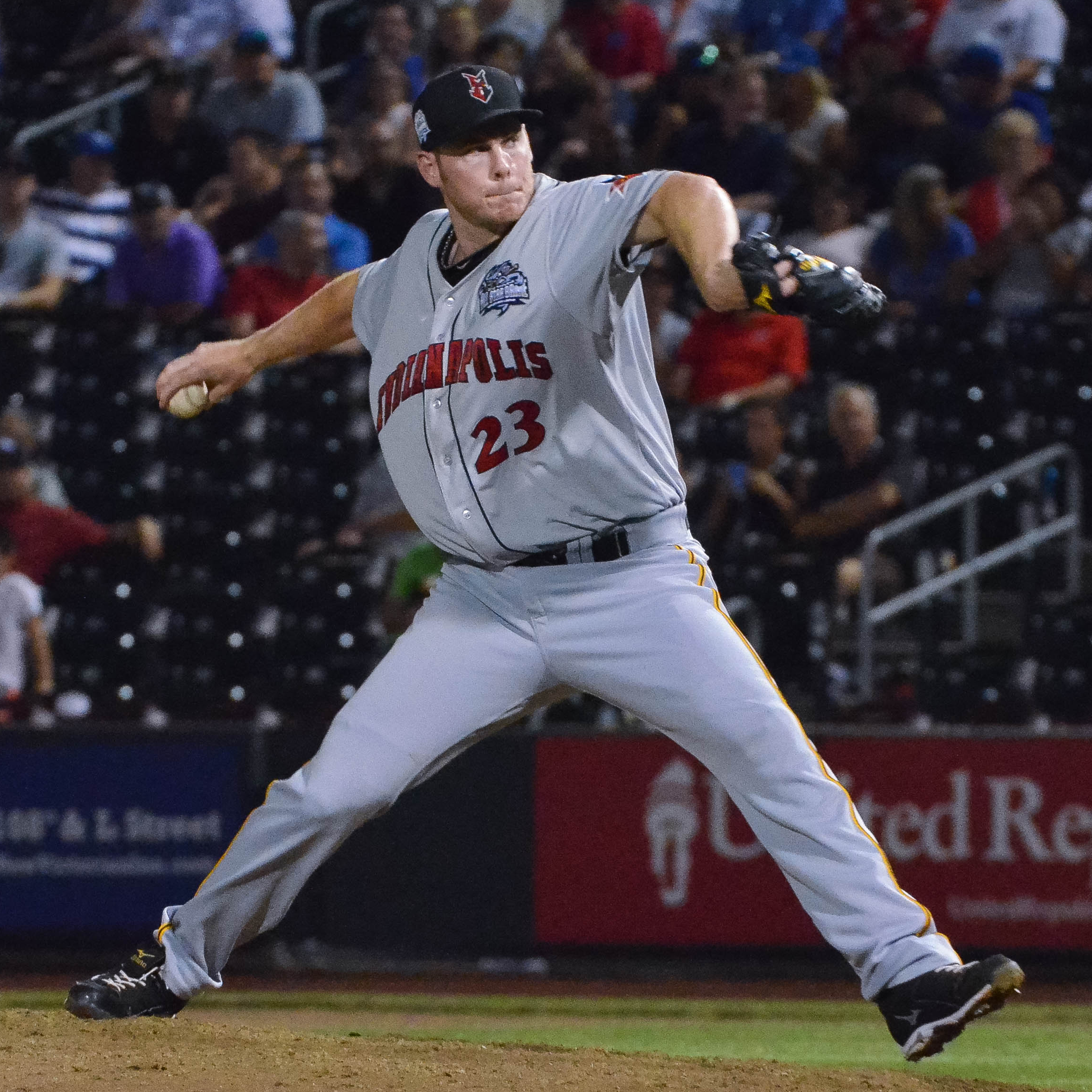
Wood pitching in the Triple-A All-Star Game for the Indians in 2015

=== Cincinnati Reds ===
On November 20, 2015, Wood signed a one-year deal with the Cincinnati Reds. Wood would enjoy the best season of his career, appearing in 70 games with a 3.99 ERA. He was designated for assignment on August 23, 2017. His 2017 season ended with a 5.65 ERA in 55 games for the Reds.

=== Los Angeles Angels ===
On August 25, 2017, Wood was claimed off waivers by the Los Angeles Angels. He continued for the remainder of the season in the Angels bullpen, appearing in 17 games. The Angels re-signed Wood to a one-year deal after the season. On May 29, 2018, Wood was diagnosed with a UCL tear, requiring him to miss the remainder of the season and the beginning of the 2019 season while he undergoes Tommy John surgery.
