= Drew Hayes (baseball) =

American baseball player (born 1987)

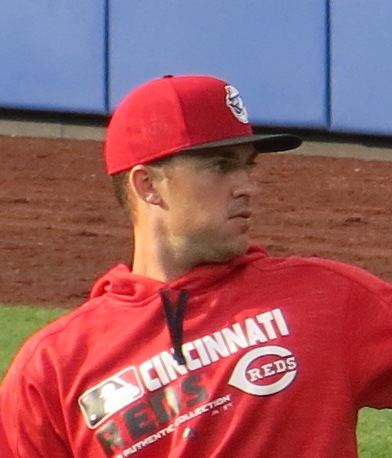
- Hayes with the Reds in 2016
- Pitcher
- Born: September 3, 1987 (age 38); McKenzie, Tennessee, U.S.
- Batted: Right Threw: Right

MLB debut
- April 21, 2016, for the Cincinnati Reds

Last MLB appearance
- May 15, 2016, for the Cincinnati Reds

MLB statistics
- Win–loss record: 0–0
- Earned run average: 8.38
- Strikeouts: 8
- Stats at Baseball Reference

Teams
- Cincinnati Reds (2016)

Andrew Trent Hayes (born September 3, 1987) is an American former professional baseball pitcher, who played in Major League Baseball (MLB) for the Cincinnati Reds in 2016. In 2023 he joined the Toronto Blue Jays organization as a minor league coach.

== Amateur career ==
Prior to playing professionally, he attended McKenzie High School in McKenzie, Tennessee, when he was drafted in the 29th round of the 2006 Major League Baseball draft by the Arizona Diamondbacks, a few picks ahead of outfielder Khris Davis. He did not sign a contract.

He initially attended Bethel College before transferring to Vanderbilt University, where he played three seasons. In his first season there, 2008, he was 2–1 with a 3.51 ERA in 21 games (three starts). In 2009, he was 4–3 with a 5.56 ERA in 18 games (six starts), while averaging more than a strikeout an inning for the second straight season. He also went 3–0 with a 1.25 ERA in 10 games for the Yarmouth-Dennis Red Sox of the Cape Cod Baseball League. The Seattle Mariners took him in the 22nd round of the 2009 Major League Baseball draft, but again he did not sign a contract. Back with Vanderbilt in 2010, he was 6–0 with a 3.91 ERA 24 games (five starts). He was listed among the best draft prospects from Tennessee that year. The Reds drafted him in the 11th round of that year's draft and he inked a contract.

== Professional career ==
=== Cincinnati Reds ===
==== Minor leagues ====
Hayes pitched for the rookie–level Billings Mustangs in 2010, appearing in 14 games and going 1–3 with a 2.42 ERA. In 2011, he was 2–2 with 22 saves and a 1.35 ERA in 51 games for the Dayton Dragons, striking out 89 batters and allowing only 29 hits in 60 frames. MLB.com named him the Single–A Relief Pitcher of the Year and MiLB.com named him an Organization All-Star. He was also a Midwest League Post-Season All-Star. With the Double–A Pensacola Blue Wahoos in 2012, Hayes was 2–3 with a 3.41 ERA in 56 games. In 2013, he posted a 5.43 ERA and allowed 73 hits in 63 innings with the Blue Wahoos. Hayes played in the Arizona Fall League in both 2012 and 2013. In 2013, he was named among the Reds' best prospects by John Sickels.

Hayes spent 2014 with Pensacola and was 5–3 with a 4.06 ERA in 52 games, again averaging more than a strikeout per inning. For the fourth year in a row, he was with Pensacola to start 2015, but was promoted to the Triple–A Louisville Bats partway through the campaign.

=== Major leagues ===
On April 20, 2016, Hayes was selected to the 40-man roster and promoted to the major leagues for the first time. To clear space for Hayes on the roster, the Reds designated right-hander Keyvius Sampson for assignment. He made his MLB debut against the Chicago Cubs on April 21. In 6 appearances for the Reds, he struggled to an 8.38 ERA with 8 strikeouts across 9 2/3 innings pitched. Hayes was designated for assignment following the promotion of Steve Selsky on May 20, and was outrighted to Louisville the same day. He elected free agency following the season on November 7.

=== Southern Maryland Blue Crabs ===
On May 13, 2017, Hayes signed with the Southern Maryland Blue Crabs of the Atlantic League of Professional Baseball. He became a free agent after the 2017 season.

== Coaching career ==
On February 15, 2023, Hayes was announced as the new pitching coach for the Double-A New Hampshire Fisher Cats.

Hayes was named the pitching coach for the Buffalo Bisons, the Triple-A affiliate of the Toronto Blue Jays, for the 2024 season.
