= Caleb Cotham =

American baseball player and coach (born 1987)

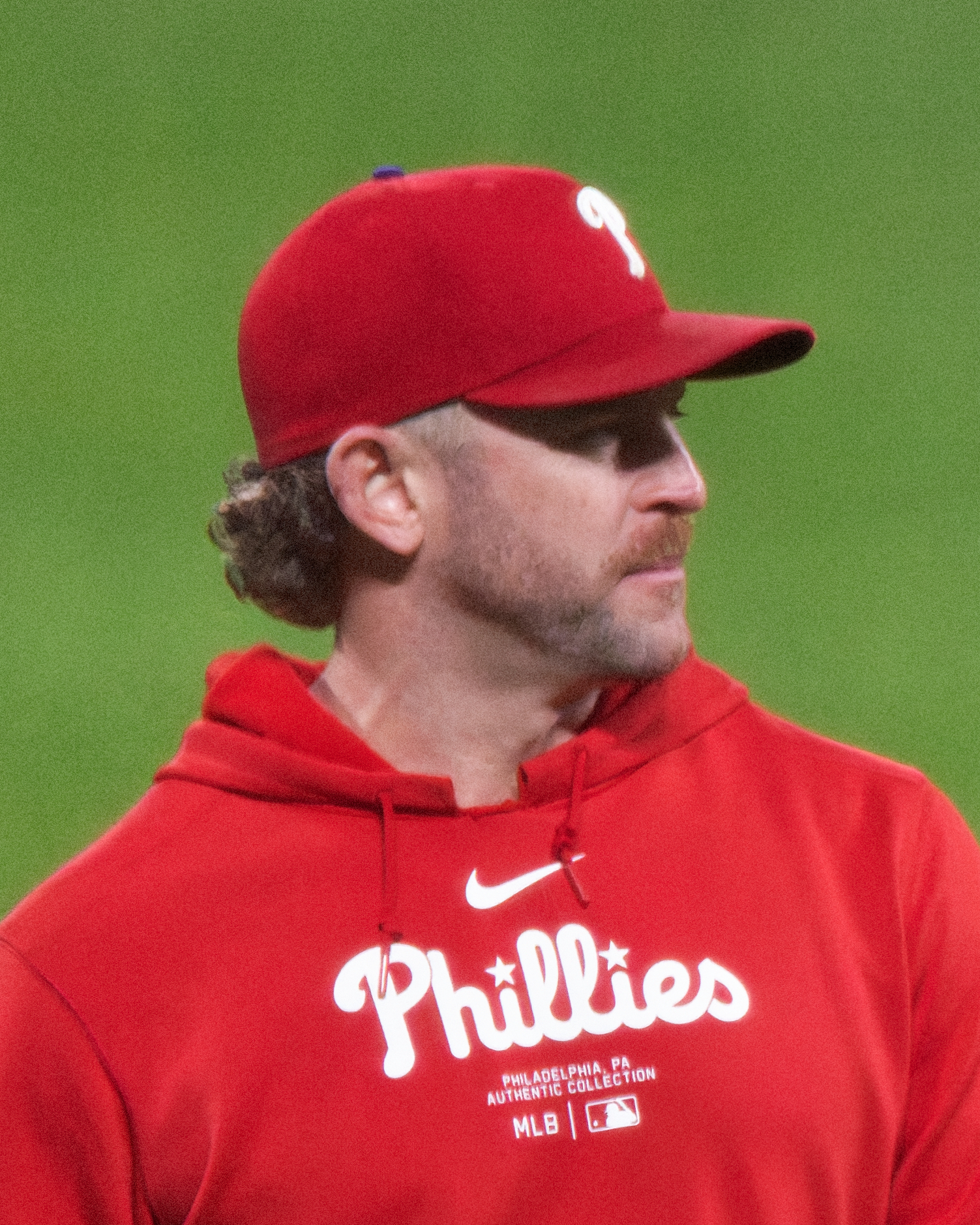
- Cotham with the Phillies in 2024

Philadelphia Phillies – No. 65
- Pitcher / Coach
- Born: November 6, 1987 (age 39); Mount Juliet, Tennessee, U.S.
- Batted: Right Threw: Right

MLB debut
- July 29, 2015, for the New York Yankees

Last MLB appearance
- May 28, 2016, for the Cincinnati Reds

MLB statistics
- Win–loss record: 1–3
- Earned run average: 7.15
- Strikeouts: 32
- Stats at Baseball Reference

Teams
- As player: New York Yankees (2015); Cincinnati Reds (2016); As coach: Cincinnati Reds (2019–2020); Philadelphia Phillies (2021–present)

Caleb Kent Cotham (born November 6, 1987) is an American former professional baseball pitcher, who played in Major League Baseball (MLB) for the New York Yankees (2015) and Cincinnati Reds (2016). He is currently the pitching coach for the Philadelphia Phillies. In 2019–20, Cotham served as the Reds’ assistant pitching coach, eventually becoming the team's director of pitching.

== Early life ==
Cotham attended Mount Juliet High School in Mount Juliet, Tennessee. He was team captain and graduated in 2006. Cotham attended Vanderbilt University, where he played college baseball for the Vanderbilt Commodores. In 2008 and 2009, Cotham played collegiate summer baseball with the Brewster Whitecaps of the Cape Cod Baseball League.

== Professional career ==
=== New York Yankees ===
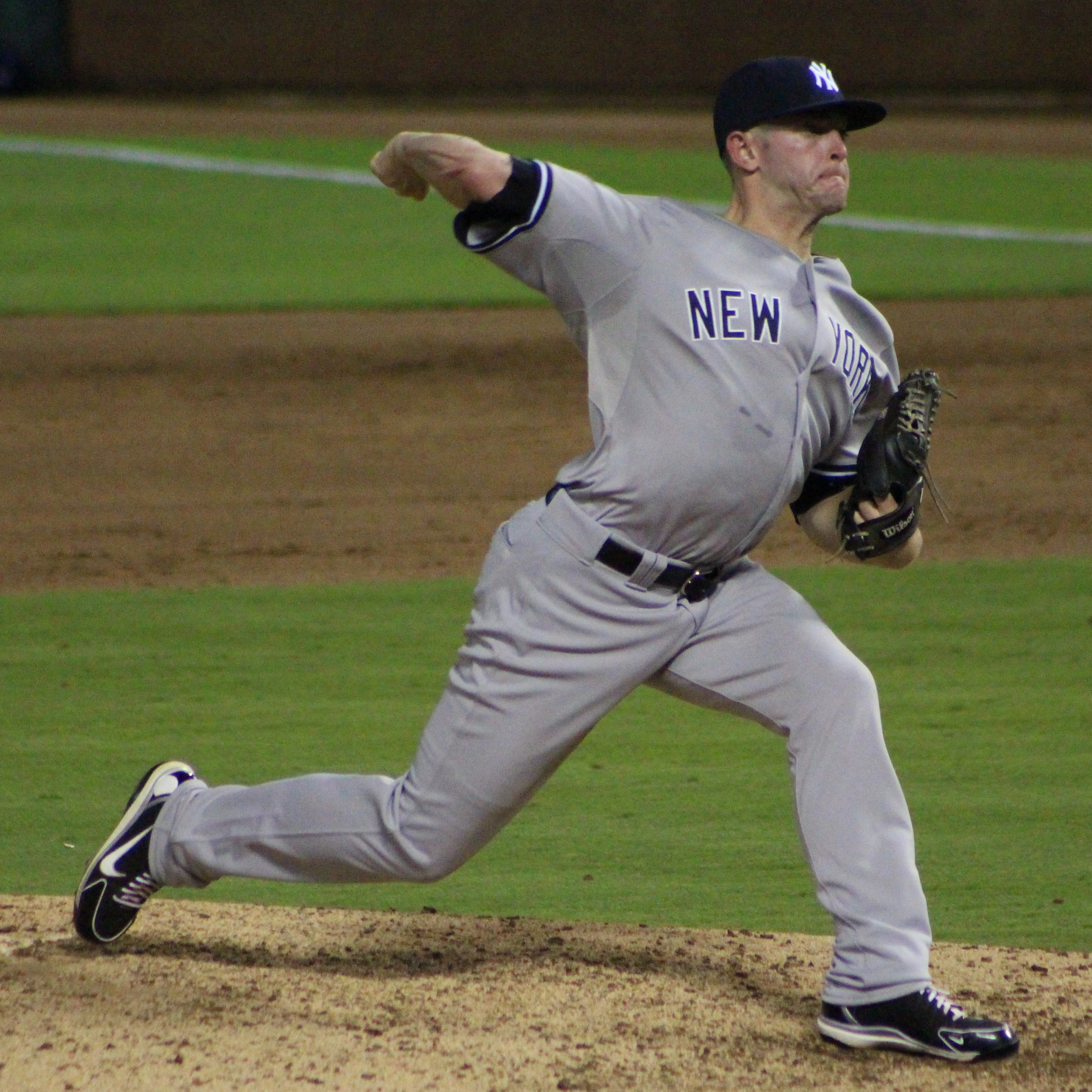
Cotham pitching for the Yankees in 2015

The New York Yankees selected Cotham in the fifth round of the 2009 Major League Baseball draft. He had surgery to repair a partially torn meniscus in his right knee. That year he spent time with the GCL Yankees and Staten Island Yankees before being shut down in September after aggravating the knee injury. He missed the entire 2010 season after undergoing knee and labrum surgery. Cotham returned to the New York-Penn League in 2011, allowing four runs on 21 hits and nine walks in 21 innings. He started the 2012 season with the Charleston RiverDogs before being promoted to the Tampa Yankees in May. Overall, he pitched to a 3.64 ERA in 101.1 innings between the two levels.

Before the 2013 season, Baseball America rated Cotham as the pitcher with the best control in the Yankees system. He started the year in Double-A Trenton before getting promoted to Triple-A Scranton in May. He ultimately pitched to a 5.07 ERA in 124.1 innings that season. Cotham played for five different teams in 2014 after missing significant time to an injury. He pitched in the Arizona Fall League that year, allowing nine runs but striking out 14 in 13.1 innings out of the bullpen.

He became a relief pitcher in 2015, recording a 2.21 earned run average (ERA) in 57 innings pitched. After starting the season with Trenton, Cotham was promoted to Triple-A. The Yankees promoted Cotham to the majors for the first time on July 29, 2015. On the same day, he made his Major League debut with the Yankees, pitching one and two-thirds innings, giving up two hits, and striking out four. Cotham was sent back down the next day, then went back and forth multiple times in August. He was called up when rosters expanded in September. Cotham appeared in 12 games for the Yankees, allowing 14 hits and eight runs in 9.2 innings of work.

=== Cincinnati Reds ===
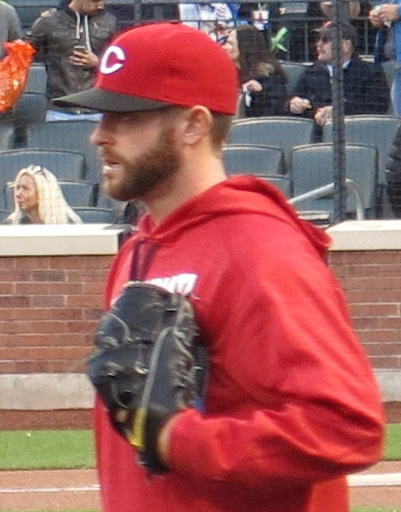
Cotham with the Reds in 2016

On December 28, 2015, the Yankees traded Cotham, Eric Jagielo, Rookie Davis, and Tony Renda to the Cincinnati Reds, in exchange for Aroldis Chapman. He made the Reds' Opening Day roster in 2016. Cotham went on the Disabled List with shoulder inflammation on May 31. While attempting to rehab from the injury, he suffered a knee injury. Cotham underwent season-ending knee surgery in August, finishing the 2016 season with an 0–3 win–loss record and a 7.40 ERA. The Reds outrighted Cotham from their 40-man roster on October 28. He elected free agency on November 7.

=== Seattle Mariners ===
On February 28, 2017, Cotham signed a minor league contract with the Seattle Mariners organization. On March 10, Cotham announced his retirement via his Twitter account.

== Coaching career ==
=== Cincinnati Reds ===
The Reds hired Cotham as their assistant pitching coach before the 2019 season, where he worked with Derek Johnson, his pitching coach at Vanderbilt. The Reds gave Cotham the added title of director of pitching, following the 2019 season.

=== Philadelphia Phillies ===
On November 20, 2020, Cotham was hired to be the team's new pitching coach.
