= John Lamb (left-handed pitcher) =

American baseball player (born 1990)

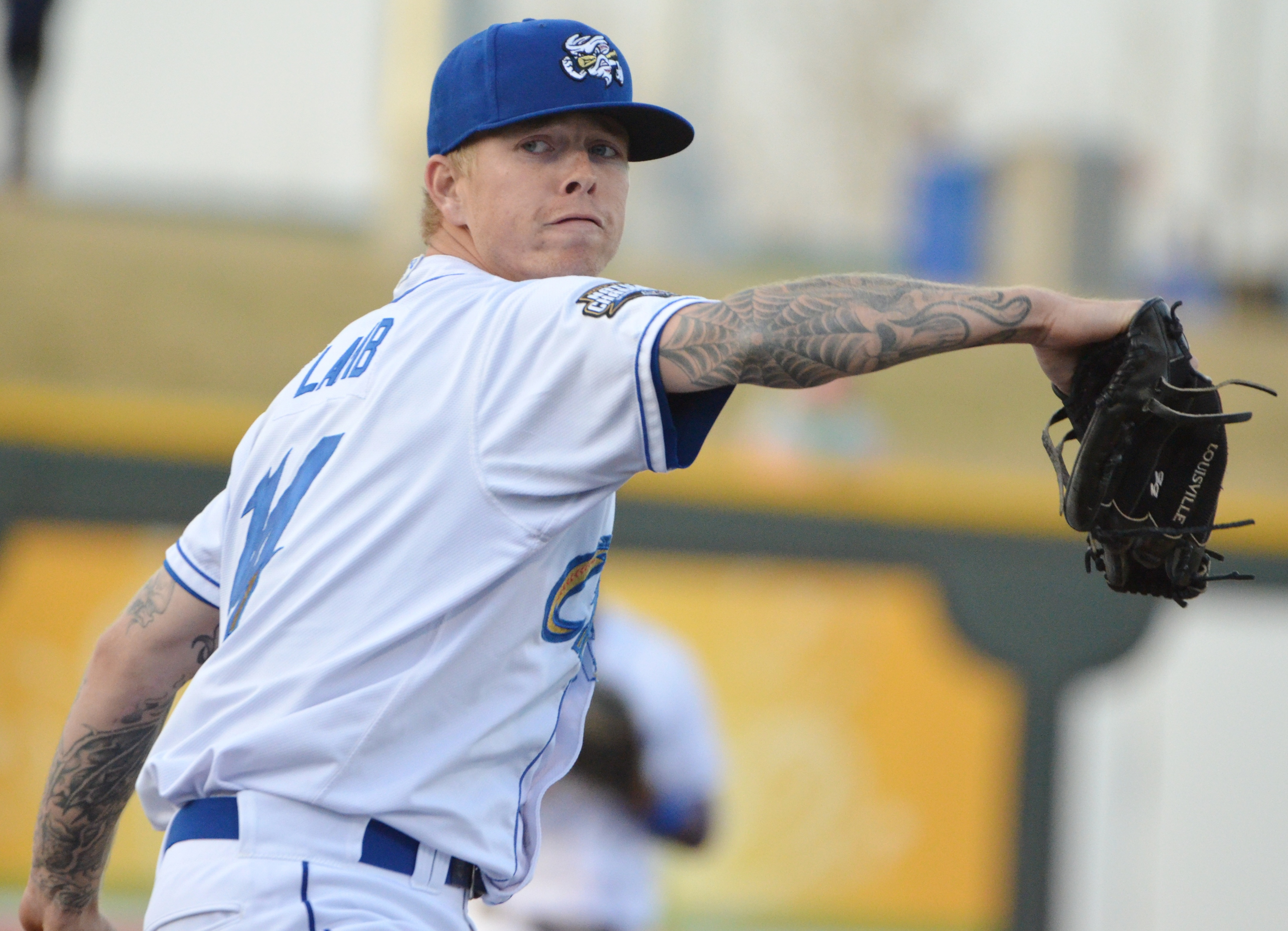
- Lamb with the Omaha Storm Chasers in 2014
- Pitcher
- Born: July 10, 1990 (age 36); La Palma, California, U.S.
- Batted: Left Threw: Left

MLB debut
- August 14, 2015, for the Cincinnati Reds

Last MLB appearance
- June 26, 2018, for the Los Angeles Angels

MLB statistics
- Win–loss record: 2–13
- Earned run average: 6.25
- Strikeouts: 127
- Stats at Baseball Reference

Teams
- Cincinnati Reds (2015–2016); Los Angeles Angels (2018)

John Michael Lamb (born July 10, 1990) is an American former professional baseball pitcher. He played in Major League Baseball (MLB) for the Cincinnati Reds and Los Angeles Angels. Lamb is the grandson of John Ramsey, the former public address announcer at Dodger Stadium.

== Career ==
=== Kansas City Royals ===
Lamb attended Laguna Hills High School in Laguna Hills, California. The Kansas City Royals selected Lamb in the fifth round of the 2008 Major League Baseball draft. He signed with the Royals, receiving a $165,000 signing bonus. In 2010, Lamb won the Paul Splittorff Award as the best minor league pitcher in the Royals' system. Prior to the 2011 season, Lamb was rated the 18th best prospect in baseball by Baseball America. He underwent Tommy John surgery to repair an ulnar collateral ligament in June 2011. The Royals added him to their 40-man roster after the 2012 season.

Lamb pitched for the Wilmington Blue Rocks of the High–A Carolina League in 2013. He joined the Omaha Storm Chasers of the Triple–A Pacific Coast League in 2014. The Royals promoted Lamb to the major leagues on July 17, 2015. He was optioned back to the minor leagues without making his major league debut.

=== Cincinnati Reds ===
On July 26, 2015, the Royals traded Lamb to the Cincinnati Reds, along with Brandon Finnegan and Cody Reed, for Johnny Cueto. After making three starts for the Louisville Bats of the Triple–A International League, the Reds promoted Lamb to make his major league debut on August 14.

Lamb underwent back surgery during the 2015–16 offseason, and began the regular season on the disabled list. The Reds activated Lamb from the disabled list to make his season debut on May 3. He was then optioned to Triple A Louisville. Then on June 25 he was recalled from Louisville to make a start later that day against the San Diego Padres. During his two seasons in Cincinnati, Lamb went 2–12 with a 6.17 ERA. He was designated for assignment on October 28. The Tampa Bay Rays acquired Lamb from the Cincinnati Reds on November 2, 2016, in exchange for cash considerations. On November 18, the Rays released Lamb.

=== Los Angeles Angels ===
Lamb signed a minor league contract with the Los Angeles Angels of Anaheim on December 2, 2016. He began the 2017 season recovering from back surgery. On May 9, he was suspended 50 games for a second positive test. He elected free agency on November 6, 2017. On January 23, 2018, Lamb re–signed with the Angels on a minor league deal. They promoted him to the major leagues on June 16. On June 30, it was announced that Lamb would undergo season ending Tommy John surgery, ending his 2018 season and possibly all of 2019. He was outrighted to the minors on November 1, 2018, and became a free agent the next day.
