= Jon Moscot =

Israeli-American baseball player (born 1991)

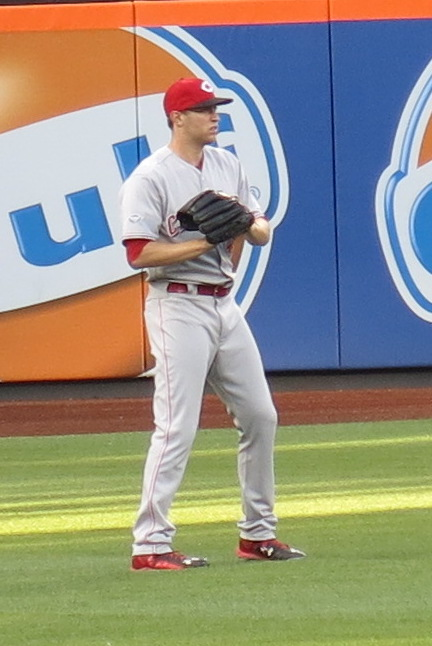
- Moscot with the Cincinnati Reds, 2016
- Pitcher
- Born: August 15, 1991 (age 35); Santa Monica, California, U.S.
- Batted: Right Threw: Right

MLB debut
- June 5, 2015, for the Cincinnati Reds

Last MLB appearance
- June 5, 2016, for the Cincinnati Reds

MLB statistics
- Win–loss record: 1–4
- Earned run average: 6.82
- Strikeouts: 16
- Stats at Baseball Reference

Teams
- Cincinnati Reds (2015–2016)

Jonathan Solomon Moscot (Hebrew: ג'ון מוסקוט; born August 15, 1991) is an American-Israeli former professional baseball pitcher. He played in Major League Baseball (MLB) for the Cincinnati Reds in 2015 and 2016, and played internationally for Team Israel.

Moscot was drafted by the Reds in the fourth round of the 2012 Major League Baseball draft. In 2013, his 140 strikeouts were the most of any Reds minor league pitcher. In 2014, pitching for the Double-A Pensacola Blue Wahoos, he was named a Southern League Mid-Season All-Star. In 2015, after logging a 7–1 record with a 3.15 ERA for the Triple-A Louisville Bats, he was promoted to the majors and made his major league debut at the age of 23. In 2016 he underwent Tommy John surgery. He joined the Reds as a pitching coach in both Rookie Ball and Triple-A.

In 2018, he became a dual Israeli citizen. He pitched for Team Israel at the 2019 European Baseball Championship. He also pitched for the team at the Africa/Europe 2020 Olympic Qualification tournament in Italy in September 2019, which Israel won to qualify to play baseball at the 2020 Summer Olympics. He pitched for Team Israel at the 2020 Summer Olympics in Tokyo in the summer of 2021.

== Early life ==
Moscot was born in Santa Monica, California, and raised in Pacific Palisades, California. He is Jewish, and his parents are Elliot and Kathy Moscot. His father grew up attending yeshiva and walking to synagogue every weekend, and his mother converted to Judaism. As he grew up, he attended Hebrew school and attended Chabad services. Extended family of his, including an uncle, lives in Jerusalem and Efrat.

Moscot has two younger brothers; his youngest brother Jed, a pitcher who had an 0.87 ERA his senior year in high school and played baseball at the University of California, Davis, and for the 2019 and 2021 seasons at Bradley University, and his brother Josh, who graduated from UCLA in 2015. His uncle Bob Reif was a starting quarterback for Princeton University.

Moscot had a small part at age 13 in the 2006 sports comedy film The Benchwarmers. He attained the Boy Scout rank of Eagle Scout.

He graduated in 2009 from Palisades Charter High School in Los Angeles. In high school Moscot pitched and played third base, batting .415 (.600 in his freshman year) and pitching with a 2.10 earned run average (ERA) and 230 strikeouts, as his team won four consecutive Western League titles and had a 48–1 record against league opponents from 2007 to 2009. He was twice named Western League MVP and All-City pitcher, and received the Palisades Post award for Most Outstanding Athlete.

== College ==
Moscot attended Cuesta College in San Luis Obispo, California, from 2009 to 2010. He pitched for the Cougars in the spring of 2010, had a 6–2 record with a 2.01 earned-run average, and was named to the all-Western State North first team.

Moscot then transferred to Pepperdine University, where he majored in economics and played baseball for the Pepperdine Waves under head coach and former major league infielder Steve Rodriguez. As a sophomore in 2011, in 12 games with the Wave he had a 2–2 record, 4.27 ERA, and 48 strikeouts. He was named to the Jewish Sports Review All-American team, and received West Coast Conference (WCC) Commissioner's Honor Roll "bronze" honors. In the summer of 2011 he played for the Hyannis Harbor Hawks of the Cape Cod League in Massachusetts, and was second in the league with 47 strikeouts.

As a junior in 2012, in 15 games Moscot had a 7–5 record with a 2.90 ERA and 95 strikeouts (second-most in the league), while leading the WCC with six complete games and 115 innings pitched. He was voted All-WCC first team, NCAA All-Stanford Regional team, WCC/Rawlings Pitcher of the Week (April 5), CollegeBaseballInsider.com West Pitcher of the Week (April 5), and Collegiate Baseball Hall of Fame and Diamond Sports National All-Star Lineup (April 5).

== Professional career ==
=== Draft and minor leagues ===
Moscot was drafted by the Cincinnati Reds in the fourth round of the 2012 Major League Baseball draft. He signed with the Reds for $317,800. He made his professional debut with the Billings Mustangs and also played for the Arizona League Reds that year, with an aggregate ERA of 2.63 and 27 strikeouts in 27.1 innings.

Moscot started 2013 by skipping the low-A Dayton Dragons and pitching for the high-A Bakersfield Blaze, with whom he earned honors as California League Pitcher of the Week and was 2–14 with a 4.59 ERA, and 112 strikeouts in 115.2 innings. He was promoted to the Double-A Pensacola Blue Wahoos during the season. In 2013, his 140 strikeouts were the most of any Reds minor league pitcher. Baseball America ranked him the Reds' # 23 prospect after the 2013 season.

He started 2014 back with the Pensacola Blue Wahoos, where he was 7–10 with a 3.13 ERA in 149.1 innings. Moscot was named a Southern League Mid-Season All-Star for the team. He was then promoted to the Triple-A Louisville Bats, where he was 1–1 with a 5.71 ERA. Overall, he had a 3.40 ERA in 28 starts for the year, with 120 strikeouts in 167 innings. Baseball America ranked him the Reds' # 20 prospect after the 2014 season.

In 2015, MLB.com rated Moscot the Reds' # 14 prospect. With Louisville, he was 7–1 with a 3.15 ERA and 34 strikeouts in nine starts and 54.1 innings, leading all AAA pitchers in wins at the time of his June call-up. Bats manager Delino DeShields said: "He looks like a big-leaguer out there." Reds manager Bryan Price said: "He's been our best Triple-A starter."

=== Cincinnati Reds (2015–2018) ===
Moscot was promoted to the Cincinnati Reds in the major leagues on June 5, 2015, and the 23-year-old made his first major league start that day. Moscot pitched 5 innings and allowed 4 runs, all coming in the first three innings, as he retired 13 of the last 15 batters he faced. In his next start, he won his first major league game on June 10.

In the first inning of his third career start on June 15, Moscot dislocated his left (non-throwing) shoulder in collision during a rundown. He was put on the 15-day disabled list. On June 18, Manager Bryan Price announced that Moscot needed surgery, and would likely be out for the season. He expected him to be fully recovered in time for 2016 spring training. Moscot had shoulder surgery the following day repairing the fractured scapula in his left shoulder, and his rehabilitation time was anticipated to be four to six months. In 2015 prior to his surgery, Moscot was 1–1, pitching 11 2/3 innings and giving up 11 hits and six runs.

In 2016, he was limited to five starts, as he was first on the Reds' disabled list in April with a strained left intercostal muscle in his side that he suffered during batting practice, and then in May with inflammation in his non-throwing left shoulder. In July Moscot suffered a torn ulnar collateral ligament in his right elbow, which led to season-ending Tommy John surgery, in which two bone fragments were also removed, on July 19. Moscot spent the 2017 and 2018 seasons on the disabled list as he attempted to recover from Tommy John surgery.

=== Retirement ===
On March 7, 2019, Moscot announced his retirement from professional baseball at 27 years of age.

== Coaching career ==
Following his playing career, Moscot joined the Reds as a pitching coach in both Rookie Ball and Triple-A.

== Team Israel ==
In January 2017 Moscot traveled to Israel to help promote Team Israel at the 2017 World Baseball Classic. Although he traveled with other team members, Moscot did not play in Round 1 as he was recovering from Tommy John surgery.

In October 2018 he became a dual Israeli citizen, partly to help Israel's baseball team make the 2020 Olympics. Moscot said: "My family was ecstatic about it. My dad was so proud that his son made aliyah." He said: "We feel Israeli. They’ve welcomed us, and we’re excited to represent our heritage, our country, our people."

Moscot pitched for Team Israel at the 2019 European Baseball Championship, going 1–0 with a 0.00 ERA as in two relief appearances he pitched 3.1 innings and gave up one hit and two walks while striking out one batter, and was credited with a win against Team Sweden.

He also pitched for the team at the Africa/Europe 2020 Olympic Qualification tournament in Italy in September 2019, which Israel won to qualify to play baseball at the 2020 Summer Olympics in Tokyo. In the tournament Moscot was 0–0 with a 2.25 ERA over 4.0 innings in one start. Moscot observed: "We are playing for something bigger than ourselves." He recalled: "I grew up with pictures of Sandy Koufax on my wall. He was my dad’s favorite player. He would tell stories about him. I loved Shawn Green. Anyone who was Jewish made it real for me. Being on this team means a lot. It’s not just playing the game. You represent that deep heritage and culture and the feelings of that Jewish kid who wants to be an athlete one day."

Moscot intends to explore splitting time between the United States, where he is a player-coach in the Reds farm system, and Israel after the 2020 Olympics. Moscot was included on the roster for Team Israel at the 2020 Olympics. He was named the starter for their opening game against South Korea, but was forced to leave the game in the first inning after facing one batter after suffering an elbow injury. The team later announced he had re-injured his UCL and would be out for the remainder of the Games.

== Pitches ==
Moscot pitches right-handed with a 90 to 94 miles per hour (145 to 151 km/h) four-seam fastball, an 89 to 91 miles per hour (143 to 146 km/h) two-seam fastball, a 79 to 84 miles per hour (127 to 135 km/h) slider, a 79 to 80 miles per hour (127 to 129 km/h) circle changeup, and an 80 to 83 miles per hour (129 to 134 km/h) split-finger fastball. He is known as a smart "pitcher" who is efficient and effective, rather than a "thrower".

== See also ==
- List of baseball players who underwent Tommy John surgery
- List of Jewish Major League Baseball players
