= Cody Reed =

American baseball player (born 1993)

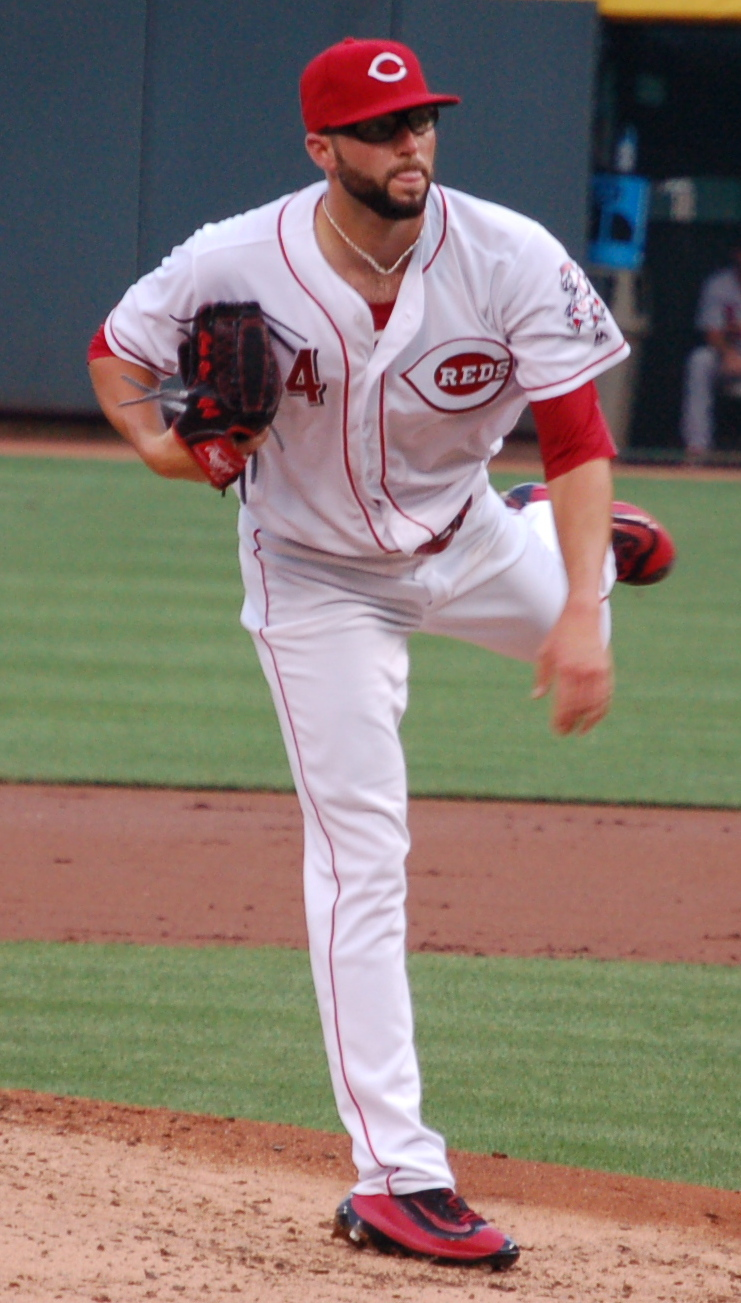
- Reed with the Cincinnati Reds in 2016

Free agent
- Pitcher
- Born: April 15, 1993 (age 33); Memphis, Tennessee, U.S.
- Bats: Left Throws: Left

MLB debut
- June 18, 2016, for the Cincinnati Reds

MLB statistics (through 2021 season)
- Win–loss record: 2–13
- Earned run average: 5.22
- Strikeouts: 128
- Stats at Baseball Reference

Teams
- Cincinnati Reds (2016–2020); Tampa Bay Rays (2020–2021)

Cody Austin Reed (born April 15, 1993) is an American professional baseball pitcher who is a free agent. He has previously played in Major League Baseball (MLB) for the Cincinnati Reds and Tampa Bay Rays.

== Career ==
Reed attended Horn Lake High School in Horn Lake, Mississippi. He holds numerous school baseball records and his number is retired. After high school he attended Northwest Mississippi Community College to play college baseball.

=== Kansas City Royals ===
Reed was drafted by the Kansas City Royals in the second round of the 2013 Major League Baseball draft. He signed and made his professional debut with the Idaho Falls Chukars where he was 0–1 with a 6.07 ERA in 29 2/3 innings. Reed pitched 2014 with the Lexington Legends where he compiled a 3–9 record and 5.46 ERA in 19 starts, and started 2015 with the Wilmington Blue Rocks. In June, he was selected to be the starting pitcher for Carolina in the California-Carolina League All-Star Game. After the game he was promoted to the Northwest Arkansas Naturals.

=== Cincinnati Reds ===
Reed was traded to the Cincinnati Reds, along with John Lamb and Brandon Finnegan, for Johnny Cueto on July 26, 2015. The Reds assigned him to the Pensacola Blue Wahoos and he finished the season there. In 26 games (23 starts) between Wilmington, Northwest Arkansas and Pensacola he pitched to a 13–9 record, a 2.41 ERA, and a 1.16 WHIP. He began 2016 with the Louisville Bats.

Reed was called up to make his major league debut on June 18, 2016. Facing the Houston Astros in his first game, Reed struck out nine batters and surrendered six hits and four runs over seven innings. He was optioned back to Louisville in August and recalled in September. In ten starts for Cincinnati, Reed posted an 0–7 record and tallied a 7.36 ERA over 47 2/3 innings, striking out 43 batters and walking 19. In 13 starts for Louisville, he was 6–4 with a 3.08 ERA.

Reed began the 2017 season in the bullpen for Cincinnati but was sent down to Louisville in May. He spent all season in Louisville before being recalled to the Reds in September. In 21 games (20 starts) for Louisville he was 4–9 with a 3.55 ERA, and in 12 games (one start) for the Reds he pitched to a 1–1 record and 5.09 ERA. Reed began the 2018 season with Triple-A Louisville. In 18 games (17 starts), Reed recorded a 4–8 record and 3.92 ERA with 105 strikeouts in 105 2/3 innings pitched.

On May 4, 2019, the Reds optioned outfielder Scott Schebler to the Triple-A Louisville Bats and recalled Reed to the majors. The Reds sent Reed back down to Louisville the day after. On May 17, the Reds again recalled Reed from Louisville. Again, he was sent back down to the minor leagues the day after. On May 27, the Reds recalled Reed from Triple-A a third time to be their 26th man in a doubleheader against the Pittsburgh Pirates. He pitched two innings, giving up three hits and no runs. On May 28, the Reds announced that Reed had been returned to Louisville and placed on the minor league 7-day injured list for a grade 2 MCL sprain in his left knee.

On August 24, 2020, Reed was designated for assignment by Cincinnati.

=== Tampa Bay Rays ===
On August 28, 2020, Reed was traded to the Tampa Bay Rays in exchange for Riley O'Brien. He pitched 2 2/3 scoreless innings for Tampa Bay in 2020.

On May 22, 2021, Reed was placed on the 60-day injured list with left thumb weakness. He underwent surgery for thoracic outlet syndrome on June 2, which ended his season. In 12 games in 2021, Reed recorded a 3.72 ERA with 7 strikeouts in 9 2/3 innings of work. On November 5, Reed was outrighted off of the 40-man roster and elected free agency.

On March 15, 2022, Reed re-signed with the Rays organization on a minor league contract. He split the season between the rookie–level Florida Complex League Rays and Double–A Montgomery Biscuits, accumulating a 5–0 record and 5.29 ERA with 17 strikeouts across 13 total appearances. Reed elected free agency following the season on November 10.

=== Olmecas de Tabasco ===
On April 26, 2024, Reed signed with the Olmecas de Tabasco of the Mexican League. In 26 appearances for Tabasco, he recorded a 4.12 ERA with nine strikeouts across 19 2/3 innings pitched. Reed was released by the Olmecas on March 12, 2025.

=== Gary SouthShore RailCats ===
On April 17, 2025, Reed signed with the Gary SouthShore RailCats of the American Association of Professional Baseball. In 38 appearances for the RailCats, he compiled a 1–4 record and 6.21 ERA with 31 strikeouts and two saves across 33 1/3 innings pitched. Reed was released by Gary on September 2.

=== High Point Rockers ===
On May 9, 2026, Reed signed with the High Point Rockers of the Atlantic League of Professional Baseball. In 11 appearances for High Point, he recorded a 3.48 ERA with 16 strikeouts across 10 1/3 innings pitched. Reed was released by the Rockers on June 28.
