= Layne Somsen =

American baseball player (born 1989)

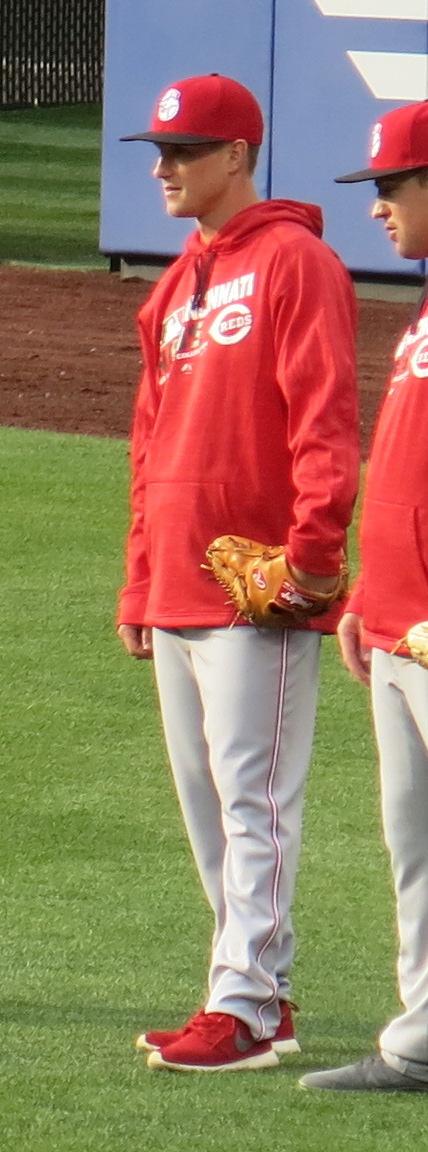
- Somsen with the Reds in 2016
- Pitcher
- Born: June 5, 1989 (age 37); Yankton, South Dakota, U.S.
- Batted: Right Threw: Right

MLB debut
- May 14, 2016, for the Cincinnati Reds

Last MLB appearance
- May 16, 2016, for the Cincinnati Reds

MLB statistics
- Win–loss record: 0–0
- Earned run average: 19.29
- Strikeouts: 2
- Stats at Baseball Reference

Teams
- Cincinnati Reds (2016)

Layne Somsen (born June 5, 1989) is an American former professional baseball pitcher. He played in Major League Baseball (MLB) for the Cincinnati Reds in 2016.

== Career ==
=== Amateur career ===
Somsen attended Yankton High School and South Dakota State University, where he played college baseball for the South Dakota State Jackrabbits. In his senior season in 2013, Somsen pitched to a 1.87 earned run average and was named the Summit League Pitcher of the Year. Somsen finished his career ranking in the top five in school history in starts (38), innings pitched (215), and strikeouts (180).

=== Cincinnati Reds ===
The Cincinnati Reds selected Somsen in the 22nd round of the 2013 MLB draft. He signed with the Reds and made his professional debut with the Billings Mustangs in 2013. A starter in college, Somsen was used as a reliever in the minor leagues. He spent the 2014 season with the Dayton Dragons and the Bakersfield Blaze. He split the 2015 season between the Pensacola Blue Wahoos and the Louisville Bats. After the season, he pitched in the Arizona Fall League for the Peoria Javelinas.

The Reds promoted Somsen to the major leagues after Jay Bruce was placed paternity list with birth of his child on April 25, 2016, but he was sent down on April 28 and did not make his MLB debut during this time on the roster, briefly becoming a phantom ballplayer. Somsen was recalled on May 9 and made his MLB debut on May 14, throwing a scoreless inning against the Phillies. Somsen became the third former Jackrabbit to make his debut since 2013, joining fellow relief pitchers Caleb Thielbar and Blake Treinen.

=== New York Yankees ===
The Reds waived Somsen, and he was claimed by the New York Yankees on May 24, 2016, who assigned him to the Scranton/Wilkes-Barre RailRiders, for whom he made four scoreless appearances. On June 13, Somsen was designated for assignment to clear room for Ike Davis on the roster.

=== Los Angeles Dodgers ===
On June 22, 2016, the Los Angeles Dodgers claimed Somsen off waivers. He was designated for assignment by the Dodgers on July 1, cleared waivers, and was outrighted to the Triple–A Oklahoma City Dodgers on July 3. He got into six games for Oklahoma City and was 0–2 with a 20.65 ERA before spending most of the season on the disabled list. The Dodgers assigned him to the Double–A Tulsa Drillers of the Texas League to start the 2017 season. He split the season between Tulsa and Oklahoma City, appearing in 39 games with a 7–1 record and 2.21 ERA.

In 2018, Somsen pitched in 11 games for Tulsa, allowing only one earned run in 12 1/3 innings. He split the 2019 campaign between Tulsa and Oklahoma City, recording a 5.17 ERA with 13 strikeouts and 3 saves across 15 2/3 innings pitched. Somsen elected free agency following the season on November 4, 2019.
