= Steve Selsky =

American baseball player (born 1989)

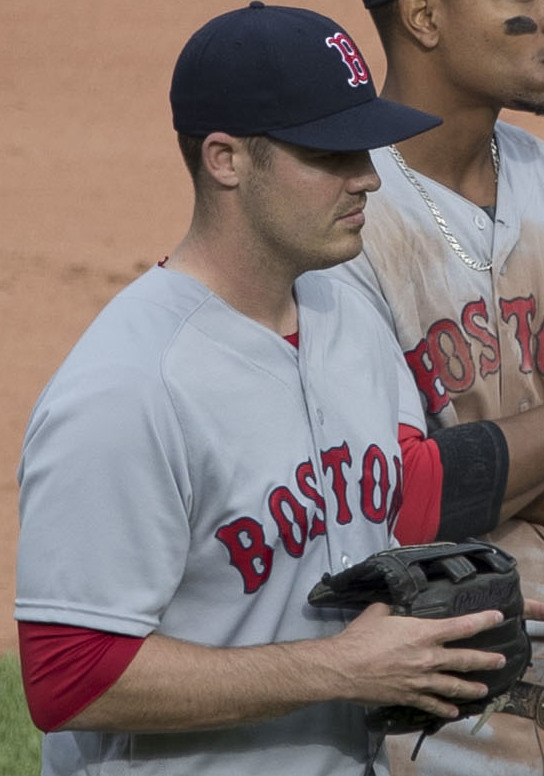
- Selsky with the Boston Red Sox
- Outfielder
- Born: July 20, 1989 (age 36); Manhattan Beach, California, U.S.
- Batted: Right Threw: Right

MLB debut
- May 20, 2016, for the Cincinnati Reds

Last MLB appearance
- April 23, 2017, for the Boston Red Sox

Career statistics
- Batting average: .283
- Home runs: 2
- Runs batted in: 7
- Stats at Baseball Reference

Teams
- Cincinnati Reds (2016); Boston Red Sox (2017)

Steven Garth Selsky (born July 20, 1989) is an American former professional baseball outfielder. He played in Major League Baseball (MLB) for the Cincinnati Reds and Boston Red Sox.

== Career ==
=== Amateur ===
Selsky played college baseball at the University of Arizona. He was drafted by the Colorado Rockies in the 34th round of the 2010 Major League Baseball draft but did not sign and returned to Arizona. In 2009, he played collegiate summer baseball in the Cape Cod Baseball League for the Yarmouth-Dennis Red Sox and the Orleans Firebirds, and returned to the league in 2010 and 2011 to play again for the Firebirds.

=== Cincinnati Reds ===
He was drafted by the Cincinnati Reds in the 33rd round of the 2011 MLB draft, and was called up to the major leagues for the first time on May 20, 2016. On January 19, 2017, Selsky was designated for assignment by the Reds.

=== Boston Red Sox ===
Selsky was claimed off waivers by the Boston Red Sox on January 25, 2017. He went 1–for–9 (.111) with a double in limited action across 8 games for Boston. On August 23, Selsky was designated for assignment by the Red Sox following the acquisition of Rajai Davis. He cleared waivers and was sent outright to the Triple–A Pawtucket Red Sox on August 29. In 79 games for Pawtucket, Selsky hit .216/.270/.360 with 11 home runs and 39 RBI. He elected free agency following the season on November 6.

Selsky re-signed with the Red Sox on February 7, 2018, on a minor league contract. He was released by the organization on March 31.

=== Cincinnati Reds (second stint) ===
On April 9, 2018, Selsky signed a minor-league contract with the Cincinnati Reds. In 82 games for the Triple–A Louisville Bats, he hit .265/.333/.448 with 10 home runs and 35 RBI. Selsky elected free agency following the season on November 2.

== Personal ==
Selsky's father, Steve Sr., played baseball for several Chicago White Sox minor league affiliates. His mother, Lou Ann, was part of the national volleyball team in 1980 and went to the world games. His oldest sister, Stesha, was a volleyball player at the University of Michigan. His twin sister, Samantha, was a two-time All-American at the University of Dayton. His wife, Brittany, was also a soccer player at his alma mater, the University of Arizona.
