= Tony Jaramillo =

American baseball player and coach (born 1978)

- Coach
- Born: August 16, 1978 (age 47); Dallas, Texas, U.S.
- Stats at Baseball Reference

Rudolpho Antonio "Tony" Jaramillo (born August 16, 1978) is a former professional baseball infielder and outfielder.

== Early life ==
In 1985, Jaramillo's parents were arrested for distributing heroin. He was raised by his uncle, Rudy Jaramillo, in the Oak Cliff neighborhood of Dallas.

== Career ==
Jaramillo played in Minor League Baseball from 1998 through 2003. He then became a minor league coach, and joined the Reds organization in 2008. He spent the 2013 through 2015 seasons with the Louisville Bats of the Triple-A International League. After the 2015 season, the Reds promoted him to their major league coaching staff as assistant hitting coach.

On February 14, 2025, the Los Angeles Angels hired Jaramillo to serve as the hitting coach for their Low-A affiliate, the Inland Empire 66ers. In 2026, he was promoted to be the hitting coach of the Angels Double-A affiliate Rocket City Trash Pandas.
