= 2016 New York Mets season =

2016 New York Mets
- National League Wild Card winners
- League: National League
- Division: East
- Ballpark: Citi Field
- City: New York, New York
- Record: 87–75 (.537)
- Divisional place: 2nd
- Owners: Fred Wilpon
- General manager: Sandy Alderson
- Manager: Terry Collins
- Television: SportsNet New York; WPIX (CW affiliate) (Gary Cohen, Ron Darling, Keith Hernandez)
- Radio: WOR (English); New York Mets Radio Network (Howie Rose, Josh Lewin, Wayne Randazzo); WQBU-FM (Spanish) (Juan Alicea, Max Perez Jiminez)

The 2016 New York Mets season was the franchise's 55th season and the team's 8th season at Citi Field. The Mets started the season against their 2015 World Series opponent, the Kansas City Royals. This was the first time in the history of the league that World Series opponents played a rematch on Opening Day. This was made possible by interleague play being scattered throughout the season. Despite being below .500 (60–62) as late as August 19, the Mets went 27–13 in their final 40 games to make the postseason in consecutive seasons for the second time in franchise history. The Mets finished with a record of 87–75 and 2nd place in the National League East. They lost to the San Francisco Giants in the National League Wild Card Game.

== Offseason ==
=== December ===
On December 2, 2015, bench coach Bob Geren left the Mets to join the Los Angeles Dodgers to fill the same position left by Tim Wallach who left to join the Miami Marlins in the same capacity. Geren served as the bench coach from 2011 to 2015. Dick Scott was hired to replace Geren on December 16. On December 9, the Mets traded pitcher Jon Niese to the Pittsburgh Pirates for second baseman Neil Walker. On December 10, the Mets signed Asdrúbal Cabrera to a two-year, $18.5 million contract. On December 15, the Mets signed Jerry Blevins to a one-year, $4 million contract with incentives. On December 16, Bartolo Colón was re-signed to a one-year, $7.25 million contract. To make room for Colón, the Mets designated Johnny Monell for assignment on December 18, when the deal became official. On December 23, Alejandro De Aza signed a one-year, $5.75 million contract with the Mets.

=== January ===
On January 22, 2016, the Mets signed Antonio Bastardo to a two-year, $12 million contract. On January 26, Yoenis Céspedes re-signed with the Mets on a three-year, $75 million contract, with an opt out after the first season. On January 29, Neil Walker signed a one-year, $10.55 million deal avoiding arbitration.

=== February ===
On February 2, 2016, Darrell Ceciliani was traded to the Toronto Blue Jays for cash considerations. On February 12, Jenrry Mejía was permanently banned from the MLB after his third performance-enhancing drugs (PED) violation. He became the first player to be banned for life due to PED use, and one of only two living people to be permanently banned, the other being Pete Rose. Mejía is allowed to apply for reinstatement after one year. However, he must sit out a minimum of two years, meaning that he will not be eligible to pitch again until 2018 at the earliest.

== Regular season ==
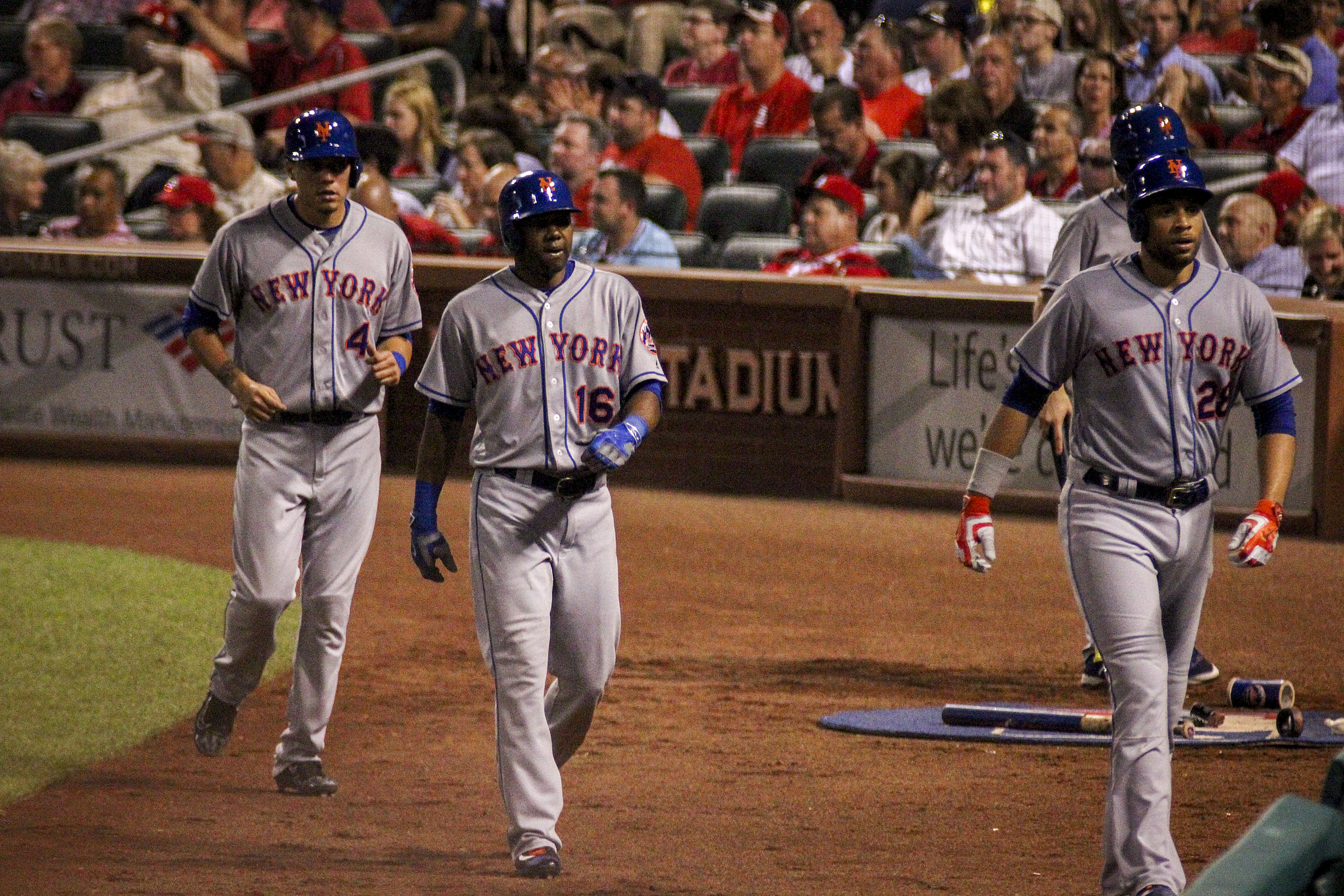
Left to right: Wilmer Flores, Alejandro De Aza and James Loney of the New York Mets walk to the dugout. (2016)

=== Opening Day ===
Opening Day starters
Name	Position
Curtis Granderson	RF
David Wright	3B
Yoenis Céspedes	LF
Lucas Duda	1B
Neil Walker	2B
Michael Conforto	DH
Asdrúbal Cabrera	SS
Travis d'Arnaud	C
Juan Lagares	CF
Matt Harvey	P

The Mets began their 2016 season by losing a close one in Kansas City, falling 4–3 at the hands of the Kansas City Royals. Matt Harvey, making the Opening Day start, was hit around by the Royals, who took a 4–0 lead into the 8th. However, the Mets scored 3 runs off Joakim Soria to make the game close. In the top of the ninth, facing Royals closer Wade Davis, the Mets put runners at the corners with one out, but Davis struck out David Wright and Yoenis Céspedes to close out the Royals' Opening Day victory.

=== April ===
Following a narrow Opening Day defeat, the Mets split the series in Kansas City behind a scoreless outing by Noah Syndergaard and a two-run home run by Neil Walker. The Mets then returned home and won their home opener 7–2 against the Philadelphia Phillies. Jacob deGrom pitched six strong innings, while Walker and Michael Conforto both had multiple RBI's. The Mets then went on a brief four-game losing streak which dropped them to 2–5. During the slump, the offense struggled to produce. However, the offense caught fire throughout the rest of the month, led by Walker, who hit .315 with 9 home runs and 19 RBI's in his first month with the team. The Mets only scored less than four runs in a game once in April after April 15, and finished the opening month of the season with a 15–7 record.

=== May ===
After a surging April, the Mets began to cool down in May. On May 7, Bartolo Colón became the oldest player to hit his first career home run, at 42 years and 349 days old. It came off San Diego Padres pitcher James Shields in a game against San Diego. Mets pitchers continued to hit when on May 11, Noah Syndergaard hit two home runs off of Los Angeles Dodgers pitcher, Kenta Maeda. The second home run gave the Mets the lead in the 5th inning. On May 27, the Mets returned to Citi Field to play the Dodgers in what was the first game in a 1986 World Championship 30th Anniversary Weekend Celebration. New York won the first game on a Curtis Granderson walk-off home run, but lost the next two games, highlighted by Noah Syndergaard throwing behind Dodgers second baseman Chase Utley, an act that was seen as intentional as the Mets were trying to get revenge for Utley's questionable slide against the Mets in the 2015 NLDS. In the series finale, Colón and Clayton Kershaw battled on ESPN Sunday Night Baseball. However, Mets closer Jeurys Familia allowed three runs in the 9th to lose the game. The Mets finished the month with a record of 14–15. This dropped them to second place in the National League East to the Washington Nationals, who would never relinquish their lead in the division.

=== June ===
The Mets continued to struggle in June, in part due to an offense not producing many runs, in particular with runners in scoring position. Neil Walker, who had led the Mets in most offensive categories for the first two months, began to have a drop off in production. The Mets also could not beat teams in their division, getting swept by the Atlanta Braves and Washington Nationals. Pitching also became an issue for the Mets. While Bartolo Colón and Noah Syndergaard continued to pitch well, Steven Matz, Jacob deGrom and Matt Harvey would not win a game in June. Also that month, Lucas Duda and David Wright went down with back and neck injuries, respectively. While Duda would return to the Mets later in the year, Wright would wind up missing the entire season. Duda would be replaced by James Loney, and the Mets brought back former shortstop José Reyes to fill in for Wright at third base. The move was greeted with criticism, as Reyes had been arrested for domestic violence in the offseason. However, Reyes filled in adequately, although he would not make his season debut until July 5. At the end of the month, following a sweep at the hands of the Nationals, it was announced that both Matz and Syndergaard had been pitching with bone spurs in their throwing arms.

=== July ===
The Mets returned home to Citi Field to start the month and swept a four-game series from the Chicago Cubs, similar to what they had done in the 2015 NLCS. Only July 4, against the Miami Marlins, the Mets fell behind 6–0 in the 4th inning, but would rally to win the game 8–6. The Mets' celebration was to be short-lived, however, as it was announced that Matt Harvey was placed on the 15-day DL. Shortly after, he opted to have season-ending surgery to resolve a condition called thoracic outlet syndrome. José Reyes would return to the Mets on July 5, just in time for a pivotal four-game series with the divisional rival Washington Nationals before the All-Star break. In the first game of the series, the Mets would hit four home runs to win 9–7. The following day, it was announced that Bartolo Colón had been selected to replace Madison Bumgarner in the 2016 MLB All-Star Game, joining teammates Noah Syndergaard, Jeurys Familia and Yoenis Céspedes. However, hours after this was announced, Syndergaard and Céspedes were both injured in a 3–1 loss to the Nationals. These injuries would force the two to miss the All-Star Game, which they were projected to start in. After the All-Star break, Jacob deGrom pitched arguably the best game of his young career, as he dominated the Philadelphia Phillies in a complete-game shutout, while striking out 7 batters. The Mets continued to play well until the final week of the month, when All-Star closer Jeurys Familia, who had converted all of his 36 save opportunities in the season at that point, uncharacteristically blew the saves in back to back games against the St. Louis Cardinals and Colorado Rockies. The Mets finished the month with a 54–50 record, and it became clear that GM Sandy Alderson would have to make a deadline trade if the Mets were to make the postseason.

=== August ===
In August, Sandy Alderson would come through with a deal at the trade deadline, as he acquired outfielder Jay Bruce from the Cincinnati Reds in exchange for second baseman Dilson Herrera and pitching prospect Max Wotell. Bruce would make his Mets debut the following day, in a 7–1 win over the crosstown rival New York Yankees in the second game of the yearly Subway Series. Bruce would help the Mets tie the series, as he hit a go-ahead three-run home run at Yankee Stadium in the series finale in a 4–1 Mets victory. However, Bruce's initial spark would quickly burn out, as he began to slump, only adding to the Mets' offensive struggles. To make matters worse, star outfielder Yoenis Céspedes, who undoubtedly had been the best hitter on the team, was diagnosed with strained right quadriceps, and was placed on the 15-day DL. Without him, the Mets' record fell under .500 after an 8–6 loss to the San Diego Padres on August 12. However, the Mets would rally to win the next two games over the Padres, highlighted by Steven Matz taking a no-hitter into the 8th inning on August 14. Matz struck out 8 batters in that game, which would ultimately wind up being his last game of the year, as he would later undergo surgery for a bone spur in the left elbow, therefore ending his season. The Mets would also lose second baseman Neil Walker for the season after he required surgery to fix a herniated disc in his back. Luckily for the Mets, Céspedes would return to the team on August 19 against the San Francisco Giants in California, in what would be considered the turning point of the Mets season. The following day, with the Mets record at 60–62, Céspedes hit two home runs in a 9–5 victory, and homered again the next night on ESPN Sunday Night Baseball, as the Mets would get their record back to .500. They then took series from the St. Louis Cardinals and the Philadelphia Phillies. New York would also win three of four against the Miami Marlins heading into September, highlighted by a Céspedes walk-off home run in a 2–1 win over Miami on August 29.

=== September ===
Heading into the final month of the regular season, the Mets remained in a race for a Wild Card spot along with the Marlins, the San Francisco Giants, and St. Louis Cardinals. To start the month, the Mets sent out Jacob deGrom to start against the Marlins, looking to close out a four-game sweep at Citi Field. However, deGrom struggled as the Mets lost the series finale 6–4. It was later revealed that these struggles were injury related, and deGrom underwent season-ending surgery on his ulnar nerve in order to relieve discomfort in his elbow and numbness in his fingers which had plagued him during the season. The loss of deGrom meant that the Mets had lost 3/5 of their starting rotation. In addition to this, Zack Wheeler, who was expected to return in July following Tommy John surgery that kept him sidelined for the entire 2015 season, would suffer setbacks in a minor league rehab assignment, and never returned in 2016. Fortunately for the Mets, Noah Syndergaard and Bartolo Colón managed to stay healthy throughout the entire season, and minor leaguers Seth Lugo and Robert Gsellman would provide great starts while filling in for the injured stars down the stretch, helping guide the Mets to multiple series wins throughout the final month. Some pivotal moments of September for the Mets included a weekend sweep at home over the Minnesota Twins, highlighted by Curtis Granderson hitting a game-tying home run in the 11th inning and a walk-off home run in the 12th inning in the second game of the series. Later on in the home stand, after the Mets were swept by the visiting rival Atlanta Braves, New York began a four-game series against the Philadelphia Phillies with a 9–8 win in 11 innings. This game would go down as one of the best games of the entire MLB season, as it featured multiple lead changes and comebacks by the Mets. The Phillies held a 6–4 lead heading into the bottom of the 9th, and with the Mets down to their final strike, José Reyes hit a game-tying two-run home run to send the game to extra innings. In the 11th inning, after the Phillies scored two runs to take an 8–6 lead, Asdrúbal Cabrera hit a walk-off three-run home run, capped off with a dramatic bat flip celebration. The Mets would end their regular season home slate by taking three of four from the Phillies, including a 17–0 win in the home finale. After this, the Mets took two of three in Miami before heading to Philadelphia to end the season, needing to win the series in order to qualify for a Wild Card spot.

=== October ===
The Mets played the San Francisco Giants in the National League Wild Card Game at Citi Field on October 5, 2016, which was presented on ESPN. The game was notable for two quality pitching performances by the Mets' Noah Syndergaard, who pitched 7 innings, allowed no runs on two hits, striking out 10 batters, and Giants' Madison Bumgarner, who pitched a complete-game shutout on 4 hits while striking out six. Both teams failed to produce any runs for 8 innings, as Syndergaard and Addison Reed held the Giants to no runs, while Bumgarner did the same by himself. During the 9th inning, Conor Gillaspie, the Giants' third baseman, hit a go-ahead three-run home run in the top of the 9th off of Mets' closer Jeurys Familia, placing the Mets in a three-run deficit that would eventually cost them the game. The Giants defeated the Mets 3–0, as they would go on to lose to the eventual World Series champion Chicago Cubs in four games in the National League Division Series.

=== Detailed record ===
Team	Home	Away	Total	Win %
NL East
Atlanta Braves	2–7	7–3	9–10	.474
Miami Marlins	6–4	6–3	12–7	.632
Philadelphia Phillies	6–4	6–3	12–7	.632
Washington Nationals	4–6	3–6	7–12	.368
Total	18–21	22–15	40–36	.533
NL Central
Chicago Cubs	4–0	1–2	5–2	.714
Cincinnati Reds	3–0	3–0	6–0	1.000
Milwaukee Brewers	3–0	2–2	5–2	.714
Pittsburgh Pirates	2–1	1–2	3–3	.500
St. Louis Cardinals	1–2	2–1	3–3	.500
Total	13–3	9–7	22–10	.688
NL West
Arizona Diamondbacks	0–3	1–2	1–5	.167
Colorado Rockies	1–3	0–3	1–6	.143
Los Angeles Dodgers	1–2	2–2	3–4	.429
San Diego Padres	2–1	2–2	4–3	.571
San Francisco Giants	2–1	2–2	4–3	.571
Total	6–10	7–11	13–21	.382
American League
Chicago White Sox	1–2	N/A	1–2	.333
Cleveland Indians	N/A	2–1	2–1	.667
Detroit Tigers	N/A	1–2	1–2	.333
Kansas City Royals	2–0	1–1	3–1	.750
Minnesota Twins	3–0	N/A	3–0	1.000
New York Yankees	1–1	1–1	2–2	.500
Total	7–3	5–5	12–8	.600

Month	Games	Won	Lost	Win %
April	22	15	7	.682
May	29	14	15	.483
June	27	12	15	.444
July	26	13	13	.500
August	29	15	14	.517
September	27	17	10	.630
October	2	1	1	.500
Overall:	162	87	75	.540

	Games	Won	Lost	Win %
Home	81	44	37	.543
Away	81	43	38	.538

- Most runs scored in a game: 17 runs (September 25 vs Philadelphia)
- Most runs allowed in a game: 13 runs (August 17 vs Arizona)
- Most hits in a game: 22 hits (July 3 vs Chicago)
- Longest winning streak: 8 (April 22 - April 30)
- Longest losing streak: 4 (April 9–12, May 12–15, June 26–29, July 27–30, August 9–12)

Games played as of October 2, 2016.

== Season standings ==
=== National League East ===
NL East
Team	W	L	Pct.	GB	Home	Road
Washington Nationals	95	67	.586	—	50‍–‍31	45‍–‍36
New York Mets	87	75	.537	8	44‍–‍37	43‍–‍38
Miami Marlins	79	82	.491	15½	40‍–‍40	39‍–‍42
Philadelphia Phillies	71	91	.438	24	37‍–‍44	34‍–‍47
Atlanta Braves	68	93	.422	26½	31‍–‍50	37‍–‍43

=== National League division leaders ===
Division leaders
Team	W	L	Pct.
Chicago Cubs	103	58	.640
Washington Nationals	95	67	.586
Los Angeles Dodgers	91	71	.562

Wild Card teams (Top 2 teams qualify for postseason)
Team	W	L	Pct.	GB
New York Mets	87	75	.537	—
San Francisco Giants	87	75	.537	—
St. Louis Cardinals	86	76	.531	1
Miami Marlins	79	82	.491	7½
Pittsburgh Pirates	78	83	.484	8½
Colorado Rockies	75	87	.463	12
Milwaukee Brewers	73	89	.451	14
Philadelphia Phillies	71	91	.438	16
Arizona Diamondbacks	69	93	.426	18
Atlanta Braves	68	93	.422	18½
San Diego Padres	68	94	.420	19
Cincinnati Reds	68	94	.420	19

=== Record vs. opponents ===
2016 National League record Source: MLB Standings Grid – 2016
Team	AZ	ATL	CHC	CIN	COL	LAD	MIA	MIL	NYM	PHI	PIT	SD	SF	STL	WSH	AL
Arizona	—	5–2	2–5	3–3	10–9	7–12	2–4	3–4	5–1	4–3	1–5	10–9	6–13	4–3	2–5	5–15
Atlanta	2–5	—	3–3	3–4	1–6	1–5	11–7	2–5	10–9	11–8	3–4	4–2	3–4	2–4	4–15	8–12
Chicago	5–2	3–3	—	15–4	2–4	4–3	4–3	11–8	2–5	5–1	14–4	4–2	4–3	10–9	5–2	15–5
Cincinnati	3–3	4–3	4–15	—	5–2	2–5	3–4	11–8	0–6	4–2	9–10	3–4	3–3	9–10	3–4	5–15
Colorado	9–10	6–1	4–2	2–5	—	7–12	2–5	1–5	6–1	2–5	2–5	10–9	9–10	2–4	4–2	9–11
Los Angeles	12–7	5–1	3–4	5–2	12–7	—	1–6	5–2	4–3	4–2	2–5	11–8	8–11	4–2	5–1	10–10
Miami	4–2	7–11	3–4	4–3	5–2	6–1	—	4–2	7–12	9–10	6–1	3–3	2–4	4–3	9–10	6–14
Milwaukee	4–3	5–2	8–11	8–11	5–1	2–5	2–4	—	2–5	3–4	9–10	3–4	1–5	6–13	4–2	11–9
New York	1–5	9–10	5–2	6–0	1–6	3–4	12–7	5–2	—	12–7	3–3	4–3	4–3	3–3	7–12	12–8
Philadelphia	3–4	8–11	1–5	2–4	5–2	2–4	10–9	4–3	7–12	—	3–4	5–2	3–3	2–5	5–14	11–9
Pittsburgh	5–1	4–3	4–14	10–9	5–2	5–2	1–6	10–9	3–3	4–3	—	3–3	4–3	9–10	2–4	9–11
San Diego	9–10	2–4	2–4	4–3	9–10	8–11	3–3	4–3	3–4	2–5	3–3	—	8–11	1–6	4–3	6–14
San Francisco	13–6	4–3	3–4	3–3	10–9	11–8	4–2	5–1	3–4	3–3	3–4	11–8	—	3–4	3–4	8–12
St. Louis	3–4	4–2	9–10	10–9	4–2	2–4	3–4	13–6	3–3	5–2	10–9	6–1	4–3	—	2–5	8–12
Washington	5–2	15–4	2–5	4–3	2–4	1–5	10–9	2–4	12–7	14–5	4–2	3–4	4–3	5–2	—	12–8

== Game log ==
=== Regular season ===
Legend
Mets Win	Mets Loss	Game Postponed	All-Star Game	Clinched playoff spot
Bold = Mets team member

2016 Game Log
Overall: 87–75 (Home: 44–37; Away: 43–38)
April: 15–7 (Home: 7–4; Away: 8–3)

#	Date	Opponent	Box Score	Win	Loss	Save	Location (Attendance)	Record
1	April 3	@ Royals	3–4	Edinson Vólquez (1–0)	**Matt Harvey** (0–1)	Wade Davis (1)	Kauffman Stadium (40,030)	0–1
2	April 5	@ Royals	2–0	**Noah Syndergaard** (1–0)	Chris Young (0–1)	**Jeurys Familia** (1)	Kauffman Stadium (39,782)	1–1
3	April 8	Phillies	7–2	**Jacob deGrom** (1–0)	Jerad Eickhoff (0–1)	—	Citi Field (44,099)	2–1
4	April 9	Phillies	0–1	Vincent Velasquez (1–0)	**Bartolo Colón** (0–1)	Jeanmar Gómez (1)	Citi Field (37,083)	2–2
5	April 10	Phillies	2–5	Jeremy Hellickson (1–0)	**Matt Harvey** (0–2)	Jeanmar Gómez (2)	Citi Field (37,233)	2–3
6	April 11	Marlins	3–10	Chris Narveson (1–0)	**Steven Matz** (0–1)	—	Citi Field (24,318)	2–4
7	April 12	Marlins	1–2	David Phelps (2–0)	**Jim Henderson** (0–1)	A. J. Ramos (2)	Citi Field (28,923)	2–5
8	April 13	Marlins	2–1	**Jerry Blevins** (1–0)	Dustin McGowan (0–1)	**Jeurys Familia** (2)	Citi Field (22,113)	3–5
9	April 15	@ Indians	6–5	**Bartolo Colón** (1–1)	Cody Anderson (0–1)	**Jeurys Familia** (3)	Progressive Field (15,365)	4–5
10	April 16	@ Indians	5–7	Josh Tomlin (1–0)	**Matt Harvey** (0–3)	Cody Allen (3)	Progressive Field (20,165)	4–6
11	April 17	@ Indians	6–0	**Steven Matz** (1–1)	Corey Kluber (0–3)	—	Progressive Field (17,621)	5–6
12	April 18	@ Phillies	5–2	**Noah Syndergaard** (2–0)	Jerad Eickhoff (1–2)	—	Citizens Bank Park (21,585)	6–6
13	April 19	@ Phillies	11–1	**Logan Verrett** (1–0)	Vincent Velasquez (2–1)	—	Citizens Bank Park (22,417)	7–6
14	April 20	@ Phillies	4–5 (11)	Jeanmar Gómez (2–0)	**Hansel Robles** (0–1)	—	Citizens Bank Park (20,057)	7–7
15	April 22	@ Braves	6–3	**Matt Harvey** (1–3)	Bud Norris (1–3)	**Jeurys Familia** (4)	Turner Field (21,173)	8–7
16	April 23	@ Braves	8–2	**Steven Matz** (2–1)	Jhoulys Chacín (0–1)	—	Turner Field (35,230)	9–7
17	April 24	@ Braves	3–2	**Jacob deGrom** (2–0)	Aaron Blair (0–1)	**Jeurys Familia** (5)	Turner Field (32,085)	10–7
18	April 25	Reds	5–3	**Logan Verrett** (2–0)	J. C. Ramírez (0–1)	**Jeurys Familia** (6)	Citi Field (30,250)	11–7
19	April 26	Reds	4–3	**Logan Verrett** (3–0)	Tony Cingrani (0–2)	**Jeurys Familia** (7)	Citi Field (26,978)	12–7
20	April 27	Reds	5–2	**Matt Harvey** (2–3)	Jon Moscot (0–1)	**Addison Reed** (1)	Citi Field (31,481)	13–7
21	April 29	Giants	13–1	**Steven Matz** (3–1)	Jake Peavy (1–2)	—	Citi Field (39,764)	14–7
22	April 30	Giants	6–5	**Jacob deGrom** (3–0)	Matt Cain (0–3)	**Jeurys Familia** (8)	Citi Field (44,466)	15–7

May: 14–15 (Home: 8–7; Away: 6–8)

#	Date	Opponent	Box Score	Win	Loss	Save	Location (Attendance)	Record
23	May 1	Giants	1–6	Madison Bumgarner (3–2)	**Noah Syndergaard** (2–1)	—	Citi Field (39,077)	15–8
24	May 2	Braves	4–1	**Bartolo Colón** (2–1)	Mike Foltynewicz (0–1)	—	Citi Field (23,847)	16–8
25	May 3	Braves	0–3	Matt Wisler (1–2)	**Matt Harvey** (2–4)	Arodys Vizcaíno (3)	Citi Field (27,356)	16–9
26	May 4	Braves	8–0	**Steven Matz** (4–1)	Jhoulys Chacín (1–2)	—	Citi Field (31,783)	17–9
27	May 5	@ Padres	5–3	Colin Rea (3–1)	**Jacob deGrom** (3–1)	Fernando Rodney (7)	Petco Park (21,608)	17–10
28	May 6	@ Padres	0–2	Drew Pomeranz (3–3)	**Noah Syndergaard** (2–2)	Fernando Rodney (8)	Petco Park (30,108)	17–11
29	May 7	@ Padres	6–3	**Bartolo Colón** (3–1)	James Shields (1–5)	**Jeurys Familia** (9)	Petco Park (41,028)	18–11
30	May 8	@ Padres	4–3	**Matt Harvey** (3–4)	Andrew Cashner (2–3)	**Jeurys Familia** (10)	Petco Park (27,461)	19–11
31	May 9	@ Dodgers	4–2	**Steven Matz** (5–1)	Scott Kazmir (2–3)	**Jeurys Familia** (11)	Dodger Stadium (42,186)	20–11
32	May 10	@ Dodgers	2–3	Kenley Jansen (1–0)	**Hansel Robles** (0–2)	—	Dodger Stadium (38,858)	20–12
33	May 11	@ Dodgers	4–3	**Noah Syndergaard** (3–2)	Kenta Maeda (3–2)	**Jeurys Familia** (12)	Dodger Stadium (40,970)	21–12
34	May 12	@ Dodgers	0–5	Clayton Kershaw (5–1)	**Bartolo Colón** (3–2)	—	Dodger Stadium (41,765)	21–13
35	May 13	@ Rockies	2–5	Jon Gray (1–1)	**Matt Harvey** (3–5)	Jake McGee (10)	Coors Field (38,712)	21–14
36	May 14	@ Rockies	4–7	Eddie Butler (2–1)	**Logan Verrett** (3–1)	Jake McGee (11)	Coors Field (34,362)	21–15
37	May 15	@ Rockies	3–4	Tyler Chatwood (5–3)	**Jim Henderson** (0–2)	Jake McGee (12)	Coors Field (36,901)	21–16
38	May 17	Nationals	2–0	**Noah Syndergaard** (4–2)	Max Scherzer (4–3)	**Jeurys Familia** (13)	Citi Field (36,701)	22–16
39	May 18	Nationals	1–7	Gio González (3–1)	**Bartolo Colón** (3–3)	—	Citi Field (30,100)	22–17
40	May 19	Nationals	1–9	Stephen Strasburg (7–0)	**Matt Harvey** (3–6)	—	Citi Field (39,494)	22–18
41	May 20	Brewers	3–2	**Steven Matz** (6–1)	Wily Peralta (2–5)	**Jeurys Familia** (14)	Citi Field (36,239)	23–18
42	May 21	Brewers	5–4	**Jeurys Familia** (1–0)	Michael Blazek (1–1)	—	Citi Field (39,688)	24–18
43	May 22	Brewers	3–1	**Noah Syndergaard** (5–2)	Chase Anderson (2–6)	**Jeurys Familia** (15)	Citi Field (40,173)	25–18
44	May 23	@ Nationals	7–1	**Bartolo Colón** (4–3)	Gio González (3–2)	—	Nationals Park (31,264)	26–18
45	May 24	@ Nationals	4–7	Stephen Strasburg (8–0)	**Matt Harvey** (3–7)	—	Nationals Park (33,096)	26–19
46	May 25	@ Nationals	2–0	**Steven Matz** (7–1)	Tanner Roark (3–4)	**Jeurys Familia** (16)	Nationals Park (38,700)	27–19
47	May 27	Dodgers	6–5	**Jeurys Familia** (2–0)	Pedro Báez (0–1)	—	Citi Field (43,462)	28–19
48	May 28	Dodgers	1–9	Kenta Maeda (4–3)	**Logan Verrett** (3–2)	—	Citi Field (42,227)	28–20
49	May 29	Dodgers	2–4	Adam Liberatore (1–0)	**Jeurys Familia** (2–1)	Kenley Jansen (15)	Citi Field (42,287)	28–21
50	May 30	White Sox	1–0	**Matt Harvey** (4–7)	José Quintana (5–5)	**Jeurys Familia** (17)	Citi Field (38,339)	29–21
51	May 31	White Sox	4–6	Dan Jennings (2–1)	**Hansel Robles** (0–3)	David Robertson (13)	Citi Field (32,781)	29–22

June: 12–15 (Home: 5–5; Away: 7–10)

#	Date	Opponent	Box Score	Win	Loss	Save	Location (Attendance)	Record
52	June 1	White Sox	1–2 (13)	Matt Albers (2–4)	**Logan Verrett** (3–3)	—	Citi Field (34,160)	29–23
53	June 3	@ Marlins	6–2	**Noah Syndergaard** (6–2)	Tom Koehler (3–6)	—	Marlins Park (22,269)	30–23
54	June 4	@ Marlins	6–4	**Jim Henderson** (1–2)	David Phelps (4–4)	**Jeurys Familia** (18)	Marlins Park (24,668)	31–23
55	June 5	@ Marlins	0–1	José Fernández (9–2)	**Matt Harvey** (4–8)	A. J. Ramos (18)	Marlins Park (28,196)	31–24
	June 6	@ Pirates	Postponed (rain); rescheduled for June 7				PNC Park	
56	June 7 (1)	@ Pirates	1–3	Jon Niese (6–2)	**Steven Matz** (7–2)	Mark Melancon (18)	PNC Park	31–25
57	June 7 (2)	@ Pirates	1–3	Juan Nicasio (5–4)	**Jacob deGrom** (3–2)	Mark Melancon (19)	PNC Park (26,605)	31–26
58	June 8	@ Pirates	6–5 (10)	**Addison Reed** (1–0)	Cory Luebke (0–1)	**Jeurys Familia** (19)	PNC Park (28,084)	32–26
59	June 9	@ Brewers	5–2	**Bartolo Colón** (5–3)	Jimmy Nelson (5–5)	**Jeurys Familia** (20)	Miller Park (22,980)	33–26
60	June 10	@ Brewers	2–1 (11)	**Jerry Blevins** (2–0)	Blaine Boyer (1–1)	**Jeurys Familia** (21)	Miller Park (27,358)	34–26
61	June 11	@ Brewers	4–7	Wily Peralta (4–7)	**Logan Verrett** (3–4)	Jeremy Jeffress (17)	Miller Park (38,423)	34–27
62	June 12	@ Brewers	3–5	Zach Davies (5–3)	**Steven Matz** (7–3)	Jeremy Jeffress (18)	Miller Park (32,491)	34–28
63	June 14	Pirates	0–4	Jameson Taillon (1–0)	**Jacob deGrom** (3–3)	—	Citi Field (35,124)	34–29
64	June 15	Pirates	11–2	**Noah Syndergaard** (7–2)	Jeff Locke (5–5)	—	Citi Field (32,117)	35–29
65	June 16	Pirates	6–4	**Bartolo Colón** (6–3)	Juan Nicasio (5–6)	**Jeurys Familia** (22)	Citi Field (33,052)	36–29
66	June 17	Braves	1–5	John Gant (1–1)	**Matt Harvey** (4–9)	—	Citi Field (40,148)	36–30
67	June 18	Braves	3–4	Darío Álvarez (1–0)	**Addison Reed** (1–1)	Jim Johnson (1)	Citi Field (32,134)	36–31
68	June 19	Braves	0–6	Julio Teherán (3–7)	**Jacob deGrom** (3–4)	—	Citi Field (41,576)	36–32
69	June 21	Royals	2–0	**Hansel Robles** (1–3)	Ian Kennedy (5–6)	**Jeurys Familia** (23)	Citi Field (40,122)	37–32
70	June 22	Royals	4–3	**Noah Syndergaard** (8–2)	Joakim Soria (3–3)	**Jeurys Familia** (24)	Citi Field (35,185)	38–32
71	June 23	@ Braves	3–4	Jim Johnson (1–4)	**Addison Reed** (1–2)	Arodys Vizcaíno (9)	Turner Field (22,324)	38–33
72	June 24	@ Braves	8–6	**Hansel Robles** (2–3)	Aaron Blair (0–5)	**Jeurys Familia** (25)	Turner Field (25,565)	39–33
73	June 25	@ Braves	1–0 (11)	**Addison Reed** (2–2)	Darío Álvarez (1–1)	**Jeurys Familia** (26)	Turner Field (40,879)	40–33
74	June 26	@ Braves	2–5	Bud Norris (3–7)	**Bartolo Colón** (6–4)	Arodys Vizcaíno (10)	Turner Field (20,484)	40–34
75	June 27	@ Nationals	4–11	Joe Ross (7–4)	**Noah Syndergaard** (8–3)	—	Nationals Park (33,109)	40–35
76	June 28	@ Nationals	0–5	Óliver Pérez (2–1)	**Matt Harvey** (4–10)	—	Nationals Park (29,918)	40–36
77	June 29	@ Nationals	2–4	Max Scherzer (9–5)	**Logan Verrett** (3–5)	Shawn Kelley (4)	Nationals Park (33,386)	40–37
78	June 30	Cubs	4–3	**Erik Goeddel** (1–0)	Joel Peralta (1–1)	**Jeurys Familia** (27)	Citi Field (40,122)	41–37

July: 13–13 (Home: 8–9; Away: 5–4)

#	Date	Opponent	Box Score	Win	Loss	Save	Location (Attendance)	Record
79	July 1	Cubs	10–2	**Jacob deGrom** (4–4)	Jason Hammel (7–5)	—	Citi Field (34,294)	42–37
80	July 2	Cubs	4–3	**Bartolo Colón** (7–4)	Jake Arrieta (12–3)	**Jeurys Familia** (28)	Citi Field (41,151)	43–37
81	July 3	Cubs	14–3	**Noah Syndergaard** (9–3)	Jon Lester (9–4)	—	Citi Field (36,137)	44–37
82	July 4	Marlins	8–6	**Jerry Blevins** (3–0)	Fernando Rodney (0–2)	**Jeurys Familia** (29)	Citi Field (30,424)	45–37
83	July 5	Marlins	2–5	Wei-Yin Chen (5–3)	**Steven Matz** (7–4)	A.J. Ramos (25)	Citi Field (29,477)	45–38
84	July 6	Marlins	4–2	**Jacob deGrom** (5–4)	Justin Nicolino (2–5)	**Jeurys Familia** (30)	Citi Field (26,191)	46–38
85	July 7	Nationals	9–7	**Hansel Robles** (3–3)	Óliver Pérez (2–2)	**Jeurys Familia** (31)	Citi Field (37,569)	47–38
86	July 8	Nationals	1–3	Stephen Strasburg (12–0)	**Noah Syndergaard** (9–4)	Jonathan Papelbon (18)	Citi Field (35,030)	47–39
87	July 9	Nationals	1–6	Max Scherzer (10–6)	**Logan Verrett** (3–6)	—	Citi Field (36,953)	47–40
88	July 10	Nationals	2–3	Gio Gonzalez (5–8)	**Steven Matz** (7–5)	Jonathan Papelbon (19)	Citi Field (35,778)	47–41
**87th All-Star Game in San Diego, California**
89	July 15	@ Phillies	5–3	**Bartolo Colón** (8–4)	Jeremy Hellickson (6–7)	**Jeurys Familia** (32)	Citizens Bank Park (28,076)	48–41
90	July 16	@ Phillies	2–4	Edubray Ramos (1–0)	**Jerry Blevins** (3–1)	Jeanmar Gómez (25)	Citizens Bank Park (37,324)	48–42
91	July 17	@ Phillies	5–0	**Jacob deGrom** (6–4)	Zach Eflin (2–3)	—	Citizens Bank Park (30,894)	49–42
92	July 18	@ Cubs	1–5	Jon Lester (10–4)	**Steven Matz** (7–6)	Héctor Rondón (16)	Wrigley Field (41,353)	49–43
93	July 19	@ Cubs	2–1	**Hansel Robles** (4–3)	Héctor Rondón (1–2)	**Jeurys Familia** (33)	Wrigley Field (41,456)	50–43
94	July 20	@ Cubs	2–6	Kyle Hendricks (9–6)	**Bartolo Colón** (8–5)	—	Wrigley Field (41,210)	50–44
95	July 22	@ Marlins	5–3	**Hansel Robles** (5–3)	David Phelps (4–5)	**Jeurys Familia** (34)	Marlins Park (23,661)	51–44
96	July 23	@ Marlins	2–7	José Fernández (12–4)	**Jacob deGrom** (6–5)	—	Marlins Park (26,841)	51–45
97	July 24	@ Marlins	3–0	**Steven Matz** (8–6)	José Ureña (1–2)	**Jeurys Familia** (35)	Marlins Park (25,004)	52–45
	July 25	Cardinals	Postponed (inclement weather) Rescheduled for 7/26 as part of a doubleheader				Citi Field	
98	July 26 (1)	Cardinals	2–3	Carlos Martínez (10–6)	**Noah Syndergaard** (9–5)	Seung-hwan Oh (5)	Citi Field	52–46
99	July 26 (2)	Cardinals	3–1	**Bartolo Colon** (9–5)	Jaime García (7–7)	**Jeurys Familia** (36)	Citi Field (37,116)	53–46
100	July 27	Cardinals	4–5	Jonathan Broxton (3–2)	**Jeurys Familia** (2–2)	Seung Hwan Oh (6)	Citi Field (37,851)	53–47
101	July 28	Rockies	1–2	Jordan Lyles (3–3)	**Jeurys Familia** (2–3)	Carlos Estévez (11)	Citi Field (38,292)	53–48
102	July 29	Rockies	1–6	Tyler Chatwood (10–6)	**Steven Matz** (8–7)	—	Citi Field (40,035)	53–49
103	July 30	Rockies	2–7	Jorge de la Rosa (7–7)	**Bartolo Colon** (9–6)	—	Citi Field (42,207)	53–50
104	July 31	Rockies	6–4	**Jerry Blevins** (4–1)	Boone Logan (1–1)	**Jeurys Familia** (37)	Citi Field (36,279)	54–50

August: 15–14 (Home: 8–6; Away: 7–8)

#	Date	Opponent	Box Score	Win	Loss	Save	Location (Attendance)	Record
105	August 1	Yankees	5–6 (10)	Adam Warren (4–2)	**Seth Lugo** (0–1)	Dellin Betances (1)	Citi Field (42,125)	54–51
106	August 2	Yankees	7–1	**Jacob deGrom** (7–5)	Masahiro Tanaka (7–4)	－	Citi Field (42,819)	55–51
107	August 3	@ Yankees	5–9	Luis Severino (1–6)	**Steven Matz** (8–8)	－	Yankee Stadium (48,339)	55–52
108	August 4	@ Yankees	4–1	**Bartolo Colón** (10–6)	Nathan Eovaldi (9–8)	**Jeurys Familia** (38)	Yankee Stadium (48,153)	56–52
109	August 5	@ Tigers	3–4	Justin Verlander (12–6)	**Noah Syndergaard** (9–6)	Francisco Rodríguez (31)	Comerica Park (33,032)	56–53
110	August 6	@ Tigers	5–6	Matt Boyd (3–2)	**Logan Verrett** (3–7)	Francisco Rodríguez (32)	Comerica Park (41,053)	56–54
111	August 7	@ Tigers	3–1	**Addison Reed** (3–2)	Francisco Rodríguez (1–2)	**Jeurys Familia** (39)	Comerica Park (32,074)	57–54
112	August 9	Diamondbacks	3–5	Zack Greinke (11–3)	**Hansel Robles** (5–4)	Jake Barrett (4)	Citi Field (31,884)	57–55
113	August 10	Diamondbacks	2–3 (12)	Randall Delgado (3–1)	**Jerry Blevins** (4–2)	—	Citi Field (31,277)	57–56
114	August 11	Diamondbacks	0–9	Braden Shipley (2–1)	**Noah Syndergaard** (9–7)	—	Citi Field (39,271)	57–57
115	August 12	Padres	6–8	Paul Clemens (2–2)	**Logan Verrett** (3–8)	Brandon Maurer (5)	Citi Field (24,442)	57–58
116	August 13	Padres	3–2 (11)	**Gabriel Ynoa** (1–0)	Brandon Maurer (0–3)	—	Citi Field (38,854)	58–58
117	August 14	Padres	5–1	**Steven Matz** (9–8)	Clayton Richard (0–2)	—	Citi Field (26,612)	59–58
118	August 15	@ Diamondbacks	6–10	Robbie Ray (6–11)	**Bartolo Colon** (10–7)	—	Chase Field (17,340)	59–59
119	August 16	@ Diamondbacks	7–5	**Noah Syndergaard** (10–7)	Braden Shipley (2–2)	**Jeurys Familia** (40)	Chase Field (20,790)	60–59
120	August 17	@ Diamondbacks	5–13	Zack Godley (4–2)	**Jonathon Niese** (8–7)	—	Chase Field (18,469)	60–60
121	August 18	@ Giants	7–10	Madison Bumgarner (12–7)	**Jacob deGrom** (7–6)	Santiago Casilla (28)	AT&T Park (41,517)	60–61
122	August 19	@ Giants	1–8	Johnny Cueto (14–3)	**Seth Lugo** (0–2)	—	AT&T Park (41,434)	60–62
123	August 20	@ Giants	9–5	**Bartolo Colon** (11–7)	Matt Moore (7–10)	－	AT&T Park (41,125)	61–62
124	August 21	@ Giants	2–0	**Noah Syndergaard** (11–7)	Jeff Samardzija (9–8)	**Jeurys Familia** (41)	AT&T Park (41,377)	62–62
125	August 23	@ Cardinals	7–4	**Robert Gsellman** (1–0)	Jaime Garcia (10–9)	**Jeurys Familia** (42)	Busch Stadium (40,082)	63–62
126	August 24	@ Cardinals	1–8	Carlos Martinez (12–7)	**Jacob deGrom** (7–7)	—	Busch Stadium (40,053)	63–63
127	August 25	@ Cardinals	10–6	**Seth Lugo** (1–2)	Adam Wainwright (9–8)	－	Busch Stadium (40,023)	64–63
128	August 26	Phillies	9–4	**Bartolo Colon** (12–7)	Adam Morgan (1–8)	－	Citi Field (31,111)	65–63
129	August 27	Phillies	12–1	**Noah Syndergaard** (12–7)	Jeremy Hellickson (10–8)	－	Citi Field (35,832)	66–63
130	August 28	Phillies	1–5	David Hernandez (3–3)	**Rob Gsellman** (1–1)	—	Citi Field (32,033)	66–64
131	August 29	Marlins	2–1 (10)	**Josh Smoker** (1–0)	Nick Wittgren (1–4)	—	Citi Field (32,188)	67–64
132	August 30	Marlins	7–4	**Seth Lugo** (2–2)	Tom Koehler (9–10)	**Jeurys Familia** (43)	Citi Field (32,634)	68–64
133	August 31	Marlins	5–2	**Addison Reed** (4–2)	A.J. Ramos (1–2)	**Jeurys Familia** (44)	Citi Field (33,471)	69–64

September/October: 18–11 (Home: 8–6; Away 10–5)

#	Date	Opponent	Box Score	Win	Loss	Save	Location (Attendance)	Record
134	September 1	Marlins	4–6	José Ureña (3–5)	**Jacob deGrom** (7–8)	—	Citi Field (29,330)	69–65
135	September 2	Nationals	1–4	A. J. Cole (1–1)	**Noah Syndergaard** (12–8)	Mark Melancon (38)	Citi Field (32,040)	69–66
136	September 3	Nationals	3–1	**Robert Gsellman** (2–1)	Tanner Roark (14–8)	**Jeurys Familia** (45)	Citi Field (36,118)	70–66
137	September 4	Nationals	5–1	**Seth Lugo** (3–2)	Reynaldo López (2–3)	—	Citi Field (30,257)	71–66
138	September 5	@ Reds	5–0	**Bartolo Colon** (13–7)	Robert Stephenson (2–1)	—	Great American Ball Park (18,169)	72–66
139	September 6	@ Reds	5–3	**Josh Smoker** (2–0)	Michael Lorenzen (2–1)	**Jeurys Familia** (46)	Great American Ball Park (13,359)	73–66
140	September 7	@ Reds	6–3	**Noah Syndergaard** (13–8)	Anthony DeSclafani (8–3)	**Jeurys Familia** (47)	Great American Ball Park (13,936)	74–66
141	September 9	@ Braves	6–4	**Hansel Robles** (6–4)	Mauricio Cabrera (3–1)	**Jeurys Familia** (48)	Turner Field (28,225)	75–66
142	September 10	@ Braves	3–4 (10)	Chris Withrow (3–0)	**Erik Goeddel** (1–1)	—	Turner Field (47,841)	75–67
143	September 11	@ Braves	10–3	**Seth Lugo** (4–2)	Williams Perez (2–3)	—	Turner Field (32,829)	76–67
144	September 12	@ Nationals	1–8	Reynaldo López (3–3)	**Rafael Montero** (0–1)	—	Nationals Park (22,832)	76–68
145	September 13	@ Nationals	4–3 (10)	**Jeurys Familia** (3–3)	Mark Melancon (2–2)	**Jerry Blevins** (1)	Nationals Park (25,796)	77–68
146	September 14	@ Nationals	0–1	Tanner Roark (15–8)	**Fernando Salas** (0–1)	Mark Melancon (42)	Nationals Park (29,669)	77–69
147	September 16	Twins	3–0	**Bartolo Colon** (14–7)	José Berríos (2–7)	**Jeurys Familia** (49)	Citi Field (33,338)	78–69
148	September 17	Twins	3–2 (12)	**Josh Edgin** (1–0)	Ryan O'Rourke (0–1)	—	Citi Field (36,941)	79–69
149	September 18	Twins	3–2	**Erik Goeddel** (2–1)	Kyle Gibson (6–10)	**Jerry Blevins** (2)	Citi Field (28,926)	80–69
150	September 19	Braves	3–7	Aaron Blair (1–6)	**Noah Syndergaard** (13–9)	—	Citi Field (29,665)	80–70
151	September 20	Braves	4–5	Julio Teherán (6–10)	**Robert Gsellman** (2–2)	Jim Johnson (16)	Citi Field (30,764)	80–71
152	September 21	Braves	3–4	Ian Krol (2–0)	**Jeurys Familia** (3–4)	Jim Johnson (17)	Citi Field (32,187)	80–72
153	September 22	Phillies	9–8 (11)	**Jim Henderson** (2–2)	Edubray Ramos (1–3)	—	Citi Field (35,759)	81–72
154	September 23	Phillies	10–5	**Josh Smoker** (2–0)	Jeremy Hellickson (12–10)	**Hansel Robles** (1)	Citi Field (37,873)	82–72
155	September 24	Phillies	8–10	Alec Asher (2–0)	**Sean Gilmartin** (0–1)	Michael Mariot (2)	Citi Field (39,995)	82–73
156	September 25	Phillies	17–0	**Robert Gsellman** (3–2)	Jake Thompson (3–6)	—	Citi Field (35,093)	83–73
157	September 26	@ Marlins	3–7	Mike Dunn (5–1)	**Bartolo Colon** (14–8)	—	Marlins Park	83–74
158	September 27	@ Marlins	12–1	**Noah Syndergaard** (14–9)	Tom Koehler (9–13)	—	Marlins Park	84–74
159	September 28	@ Marlins	5–2	**Seth Lugo** (5–2)	José Ureña (4–9)	**Jeurys Familia** (50)	Marlins Park	85–74
160	September 30	@ Phillies	5–1	**Robert Gsellman** (4–2)	Alec Asher (2–1)	—	Citizens Bank Park	86–74
161	October 1	@ Phillies	5–3	**Bartolo Colon** (15–8)	Patrick Schuster (0–1)	**Jeurys Familia** (51)	Citizens Bank Park	87–74
162	October 2	@ Phillies	2–5	Colton Murray (1–1)	**Erik Goeddel** (1–2)	Héctor Neris (2)	Citizens Bank Park	87–75

=== Postseason ===
2016 New York Mets Postseason (0–1)
NL Wild Card Game vs. San Francisco Giants (0–1)

#	Date	Opponent	Score	Win	Loss	Save	Location (Attendance)	Series
1	October 5	Giants	0–3	Bumgarner (1–0)	**Familia** (0–1)		Citi Field	0–1

== Postseason rosters ==
Playoff rosters
National League Wild Card Game

- Pitchers: 27 Jeurys Familia 34 Noah Syndergaard 39 Jerry Blevins 40 Bartolo Colón 43 Addison Reed 47 Hansel Robles 59 Fernando Salas 65 Robert Gsellman 66 Josh Edgin
- Catchers: 18 Travis d'Arnaud 26 Kevin Plawecki 44 René Rivera
- Infielders: 7 José Reyes 13 Asdrúbal Cabrera 28 James Loney 29 Eric Campbell 54 T.J. Rivera 55 Kelly Johnson 56 Ty Kelly
- Outfielders: 3 Curtis Granderson 12 Juan Lagares 16 Alejandro De Aza 19 Jay Bruce 30 Michael Conforto 52 Yoenis Céspedes

== Roster ==
2016 New York Mets
Roster
Pitchers: 59 Antonio Bastardo; 39 Jerry Blevins; 40 Bartolo Colón; 48 Jacob deGrom; 66 Josh Edgin; 27 Jeurys Familia; 36 Sean Gilmartin; 62 Erik Goeddel; 65 Robert Gsellman; 33 Matt Harvey; 51 Jim Henderson; 67 Seth Lugo; 32 Steven Matz; 50 Rafael Montero; 49 Jon Niese; 43 Addison Reed; 47 Hansel Robles; 59 Fernando Salas; 58,59 Josh Smoker; 34 Noah Syndergaard; 35 Logan Verrett; 63 Gabriel Ynoa	Catchers: 7,18 Travis d'Arnaud; 26 Kevin Plawecki; 44 René Rivera; Infielders: 13 Asdrúbal Cabrera; 29 Eric Campbell; 2 Gavin Cecchini; 21 Lucas Duda; 4 Wilmer Flores; 55 Kelly Johnson; 55,56 Ty Kelly; 28 James Loney; 7 José Reyes; 15 Matt Reynolds; 54 T.J. Rivera; 20 Neil Walker; 5 David Wright	Outfielders: 19 Jay Bruce; 52 Yoenis Céspedes; 30 Michael Conforto; 16 Alejandro De Aza; 3 Curtis Granderson; 12 Juan Lagares; 9 Brandon Nimmo; 1 Justin Ruggiano	Manager: 10 Terry Collins; Coaches: 25 Ricky Bones (bullpen); 22 Tom Goodwin (first base); 78 Eric Langill (bullpen catcher); 57 Kevin Long (hitting); 53 Dave Racaniello (bullpen catcher); 6 Pat Roessler (assistant hitting); 23 Dick Scott (bench); 11 Tim Teufel (third base); 38 Dan Warthen (pitching)

== Statistics ==
=== Batting ===
(Updated as of 10/2/16)

Players in bold are on the active roster.

Note: G = Games played; AB = At bats; R = Runs; H = Hits; 2B = Doubles; 3B = Triples; HR = Home runs; RBI = Runs batted in; BB = Walks; SO = Strikeouts; Avg. = Batting average; OBP = On-base percentage; SLG = Slugging percentage; SB = Stolen bases

Player	G	AB	R	H	2B	3B	HR	RBI	BB	SO	AVG	OBP	SLG	SB
Jay Bruce	50	169	14	37	5	0	8	19	17	43	.219	.294	.391	0
Jerry Blevins	73	1	0	0	0	0	0	0	0	0	.000	.000	.000	0
Asdrúbal Cabrera	141	568	65	146	30	1	23	62	38	103	.280	.336	.474	5
Eric Campbell	40	88	9	13	1	0	1	9	10	24	.173	.284	.227	1
Gavin Cecchini	4	6	2	2	2	0	0	2	0	2	.333	.429	.667	0
Yoenis Céspedes	132	543	72	134	25	1	31	86	51	108	.280	.354	.530	3
Bartolo Colón	34	65	4	5	2	0	1	2	1	40	.083	.098	.167	0
**Michael Conforto**	109	348	38	67	21	1	12	42	36	89	.220	.310	.414	2
**Travis d'Arnaud**	75	251	27	62	7	0	4	15	19	50	.247	.307	.323	0
Alejandro De Aza	130	234	31	48	9	0	6	25	26	67	.205	.297	.321	4
**Jacob deGrom**	27	42	6	6	1	0	0	2	3	12	.143	.200	.167	0
Lucas Duda	47	153	20	35	7	0	7	23	15	36	.229	.302	.412	0
**Wilmer Flores**	103	307	38	82	14	0	16	49	23	48	.267	.319	.469	1
Curtis Granderson	150	545	88	129	24	5	30	59	74	130	.237	.335	.464	4
Robert Gsellman	8	15	0	1	0	0	0	0	0	9	.067	.067	.067	0
Matt Harvey	17	22	2	3	1	0	0	0	0	8	.136	.136	.182	0
Kelly Johnson	82	183	17	49	8	0	9	24	15	40	.268	.328	.459	3
Ty Kelly	39	58	9	14	1	1	1	7	11	9	.241	.352	.345	0
**Juan Lagares**	79	142	15	34	7	2	3	9	11	27	.239	.301	.380	4
James Loney	100	343	30	91	16	1	9	34	16	37	.265	.307	.397	0
**Seth Lugo**	17	16	2	3	1	0	0	1	1	2	.188	.222	.250	0
**Steven Matz**	24	36	0	5	1	1	0	2	4	11	.139	.220	.222	0
Rafael Montero	9	5	0	0	0	0	0	0	0	3	.000	.000	.000	0
**Brandon Nimmo**	32	73	12	20	1	0	1	6	6	20	.274	.338	.329	0
**Kevin Plawecki**	48	132	6	26	6	0	1	11	17	33	.197	.298	.265	0
José Reyes	60	255	45	68	13	4	8	24	23	49	.267	.326	.443	9
Matt Reynolds	47	89	11	20	8	0	3	13	4	34	.225	.266	.416	0
René Rivera	65	185	12	41	4	0	6	26	16	54	.222	.291	.341	0
T.J. Rivera	33	105	10	35	4	1	3	16	3	17	.333	.345	.476	0
Hansel Robles	68	3	0	0	0	0	0	0	0	2	.000	.000	.000	0
Justin Ruggiano	8	20	4	7	0	0	2	6	2	9	.350	.409	.650	0
Josh Smoker	20	1	0	0	0	0	0	0	0	1	.000	.000	.000	0
**Noah Syndergaard**	31	58	6	11	3	0	3	6	7	34	.190	.277	.397	0
Logan Verrett	35	19	1	1	1	0	0	0	0	12	.053	.053	.105	0
Neil Walker	113	412	57	116	9	1	23	55	42	84	.282	.347	.476	3
David Wright	37	137	18	31	8	0	7	14	26	55	.226	.350	.438	3
Gabriel Ynoa	10	3	0	0	0	0	0	0	0	0	.000	.000	.000	0
**Team totals**	**162**	**5459**	**671**	**1342**	**240**	**19**	**218**	**649**	**517**	**1302**	**.246**	**.316**	**.417**	**42**

=== Pitching ===
(Updated as of 10/2/16)

Players in bold are on the active roster.

Note: W = Wins; L = Losses; ERA = Earned run average; G = Games pitched; GS = Games started; SV = Saves; IP = Innings pitched; H = Hits allowed; R = Runs allowed; ER = Earned runs allowed; HR = Home runs allowed; BB = Walks allowed; K = Strikeouts

Player	W	L	ERA	G	GS	SV	IP	H	R	ER	HR	BB	K
Antonio Bastardo	0	0	4.74	41	0	0	43.2	41	24	23	8	21	46
Jerry Blevins	4	2	2.79	73	0	2	42.0	36	14	13	4	15	52
Bartolo Colón	15	8	3.43	34	33	0	191.2	200	81	73	24	32	128
**Jacob deGrom**	7	8	3.04	24	24	0	148.0	142	53	50	15	36	143
Josh Edgin	1	0	5.23	16	0	0	10.1	10	6	6	1	6	11
Jeurys Familia	3	4	2.55	78	0	51	77.2	63	25	22	1	31	84
Sean Gilmartin	0	1	7.13	14	1	0	17.2	21	14	14	4	7	11
Erik Goeddel	2	2	4.54	36	0	0	35.2	33	20	18	5	14	36
**Robert Gsellman**	4	2	2.42	8	7	0	44.2	42	12	12	1	15	42
Matt Harvey	4	10	4.86	17	17	0	92.2	111	55	50	8	25	76
Jim Henderson	2	2	4.11	44	0	0	38.0	34	17	16	7	14	40
**Seth Lugo**	5	2	2.67	17	8	0	64.0	49	19	19	7	21	45
**Steven Matz**	9	8	3.40	22	22	0	132.1	129	53	50	14	31	129
**Rafael Montero**	0	1	8.05	9	3	0	19.0	23	17	17	4	16	20
Jon Niese	0	1	11.45	6	2	0	11.0	13	14	14	4	9	12
Addison Reed	4	2	1.97	80	0	1	77.2	60	18	17	4	13	91
Hansel Robles	6	4	3.48	68	0	1	77.2	69	32	30	7	36	85
Fernando Salas	0	1	2.08	17	0	0	17.1	11	4	4	3	0	19
Josh Smoker	3	0	4.70	20	0	0	15.1	16	10	8	4	4	25
**Noah Syndergaard**	14	9	2.60	31	30	0	183.2	168	61	53	11	43	218
Logan Verrett	3	8	5.20	35	12	0	91.2	100	55	53	16	43	66
Gabriel Ynoa	1	0	6.38	10	3	0	18.1	26	13	13	0	7	17
**Team totals**	**87**	**75**	**3.57**	**162**	**162**	**55**	**1447.0**	**1397**	**617**	**574**	**152**	**439**	**1396**

== Farm system ==
Level	Team	League	Manager
AAA	Las Vegas 51s	Pacific Coast League	Wally Backman
AA	Binghamton Mets	Eastern League	Pedro López
A-Advanced	St. Lucie Mets	Florida State League	Luis Rojas
A	Columbia Fireflies	South Atlantic League	José Leger
A-Short Season	Brooklyn Cyclones	New York–Penn League	Tom Gamboa
Rookie	Kingsport Mets	Appalachian League	Luis Rivera
Rookie	GCL Mets	Gulf Coast League	José Carreño
Rookie	DSL Mets 1 & 2	Dominican Summer League	Manny Martínez; David Davalillo
