= Brandon Nimmo =

American baseball player (born 1993)

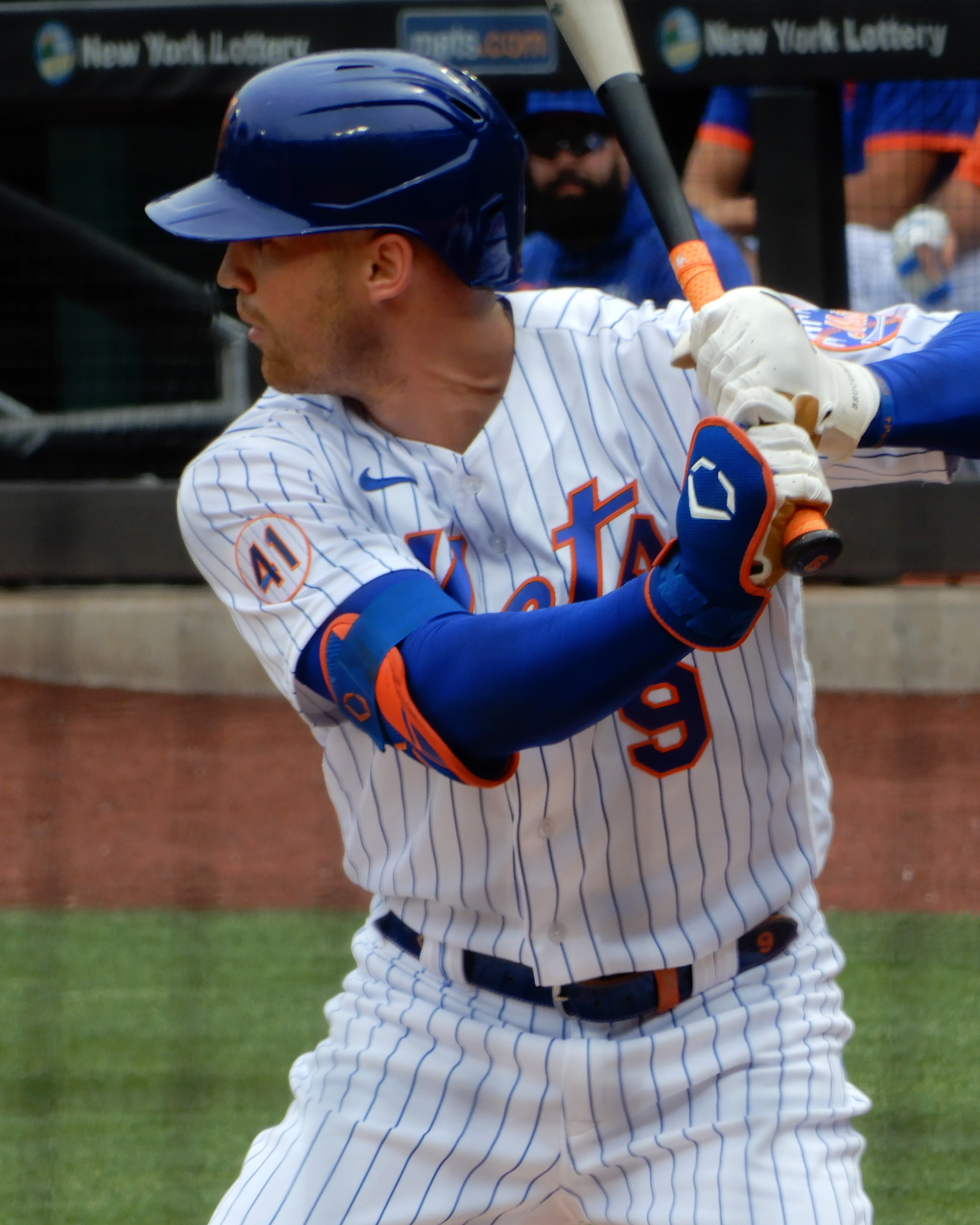
- Nimmo with the Mets in 2021

Texas Rangers – No. 24
- Outfielder
- Born: March 27, 1993 (age 33); Cheyenne, Wyoming, U.S.
- Bats: Left Throws: Right

MLB debut
- June 26, 2016, for the New York Mets

MLB statistics (through 2026 season)
- Batting average: .261
- Home runs: 149
- Runs batted in: 525
- Stats at Baseball Reference

Teams
- New York Mets (2016–2025); Texas Rangers (2026–present)

Brandon Tate Nimmo (born March 27, 1993) is an American professional baseball outfielder for the Texas Rangers of Major League Baseball (MLB). He has previously played in MLB for the New York Mets. Nimmo was selected by the Mets in the first round of the 2011 MLB draft, and made his MLB debut with them in 2016.

== Early life and education ==
Nimmo was born to Ron, a certified public accountant from La Junta, Colorado, and Patti Nimmo in Cheyenne, Wyoming. He has a brother, Bryce (who had a successful college baseball career for the Nebraska Cornhuskers), and a sister, Kristen. He wanted to be a bull rider as a child. Nimmo grew up a Colorado Rockies fan.

Nimmo attended Cheyenne East High School in Cheyenne. As Wyoming is one of only two states that do not offer high school baseball, Nimmo played American Legion Baseball. In 2010, he batted .448 with 15 home runs and 34 stolen bases in 70 games for his club, Post 6.

The Mets scouted Nimmo's Legion games and other events. One such event was the 2010 Under Armour All-America Baseball Game at Wrigley Field, where Nimmo went 2-for-4 with a triple, two runs scored and two runs batted in to earn co-MVP honors with pitcher Nick Burdi.

Baseball America ranked Nimmo among the Top 50 prospects for the 2011 draft at number 35. When the Mets selected Nimmo with the 13th overall pick in 2011, he became the highest-drafted Wyomingite in the history of the Major League Baseball draft. Of the 13 players selected from Wyoming high schools, the previous highest pick was pitcher Michael Beaver, selected by the Philadelphia Phillies in the sixth round (109th overall) of the 1966 Major League Baseball draft. Nimmo signed for $2.1 million at the age of 18. If left unsigned, he had a verbal commitment to attend the University of Arkansas.

== Professional career ==
=== New York Mets ===
==== Minor leagues ====
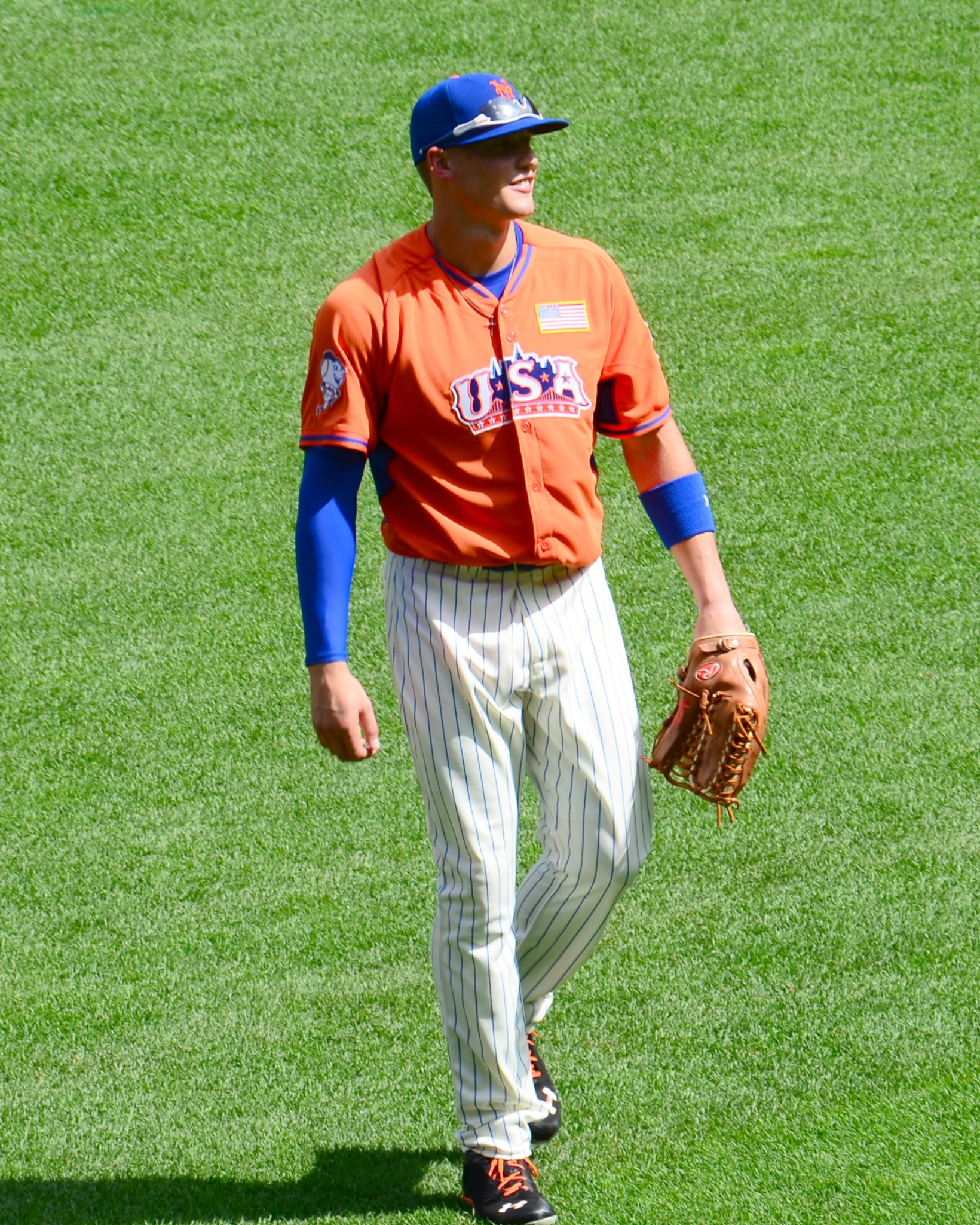
Nimmo in the 2013 All-Star Futures Game at Citi Field

Nimmo played 10 games with the rookie-level Gulf Coast League Mets and the Kingsport Mets towards the end of the 2011 season. He combined to hit .211 with four runs batted in. He spent the following season with the Low-A Brooklyn Cyclones of the New York–Penn League. On July 30, 2012, Nimmo posted the first four-hit game of his career, falling just a triple short of the cycle, with three runs scored and two RBI to lead the Cyclones in a 10–5 win over the Mahoning Valley Scrappers. On August 18, Nimmo capped a career-high six-RBI night with his second grand slam of the season. Nimmo was the only player in the New York–Penn League with two grand slams in 2012, his first coming on June 30. For the season, Nimmo batted .248 with six home runs and 40 RBIs in 266 at bats. Nimmo placed fourth in doubles and fifth in RBIs for the New York–Penn League.

Nimmo began the 2013 season with the Single-A Savannah Sand Gnats and was ranked fourth among Mets prospects. By April 17, Nimmo was the leading hitter in the South Atlantic League with a .447 batting average, earning him a SAL mid-season All-Star nod. He was also voted into the 2013 All-Star Futures Game held at the Mets' Citi Field.

By season's end, his batting average fell to .273 with two home runs and 40 RBIs. His performance at the plate was considered underwhelming as he averaged more than a strikeout per game. His numbers may have been hampered by a spacious home ballpark in Savannah that's tough on lefty power hitters, as well as a wrist injury that caused him to miss some games.

Nimmo started the 2014 season with High-A St. Lucie Mets of the Florida State League. After batting .322 with four home runs, 25 RBIs, a .448 on-base percentage and .458 slugging percentage to earn FSL All-Star honors, he received a mid-season promotion to Double-A Binghamton Mets on June 19. Between his two clubs, Nimmo posted a .278 average, 10 home runs and 51 RBI.

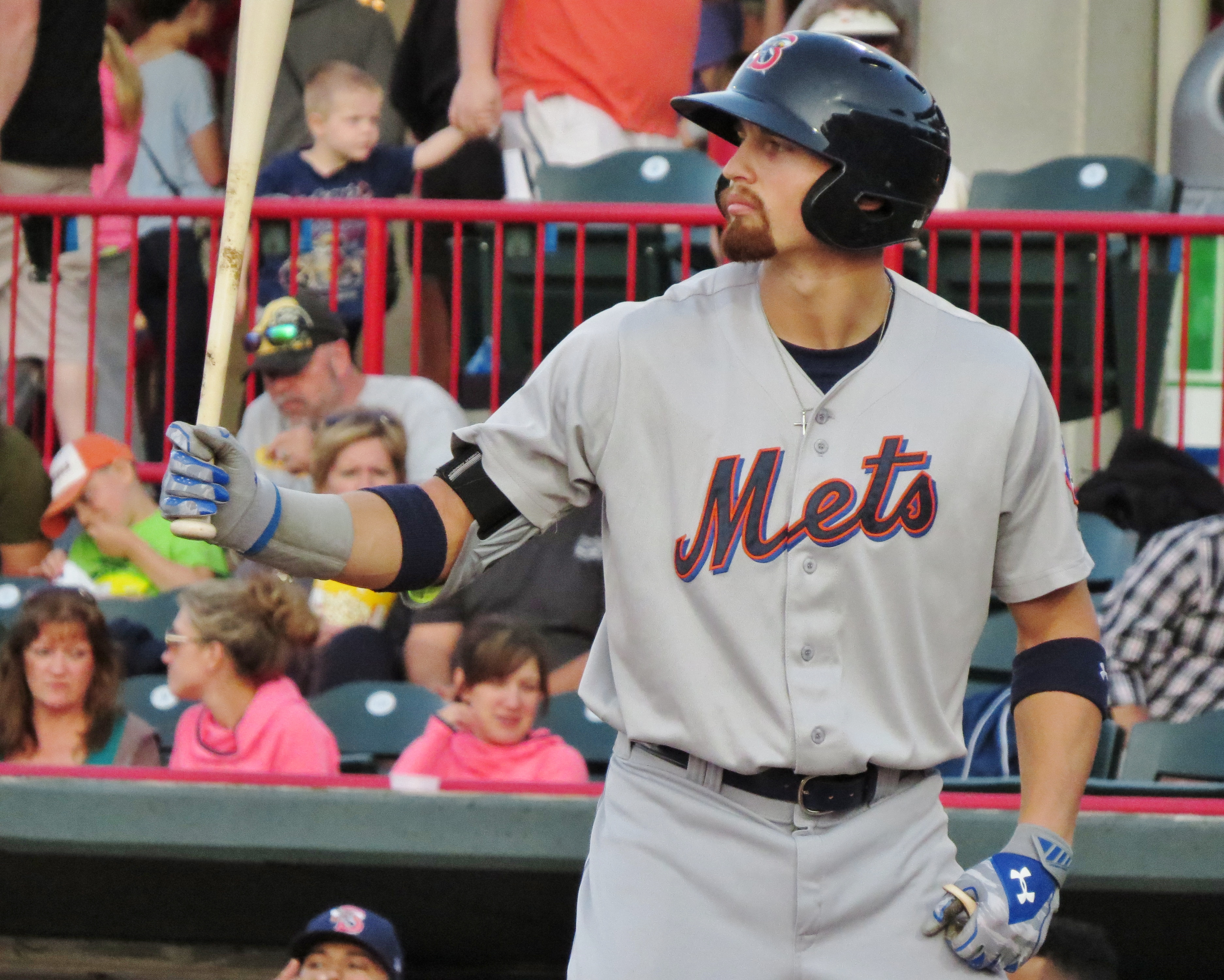
Nimmo with the Binghamton Mets in 2015

After a brief four game stint with St. Lucie at the start of the 2015 season, Nimmo was promoted to the Binghamton Mets. He suffered a knee injury on April 29 that caused him to miss some playing time. Prior to the knee injury, Nimmo was batting .297 with a .368 on-base percentage and a .420 slugging percentage in 34 games. On July 28, it was announced that Nimmo was promoted to the Mets Triple-A affiliate, Las Vegas 51s as the starting center fielder. Once again, his season was interrupted by injury when he fouled a baseball off his nose in a batting cage. The Mets added him to their 40-man roster after the season to protect him from the Rule 5 draft.

==== 2016 ====
Nimmo began the 2016 season with the Las Vegas 51s; through 250 at bats he was hitting .328 with five home runs and 37 RBI. Nimmo was promoted to the Major Leagues on June 25 to replace the slumping Michael Conforto whose batting average had fallen to .130 since May 1. He made his major league debut the next day against the Atlanta Braves and went 0-for-4. On June 27, his second game, Nimmo recorded his first hit and his first run against Washington Nationals pitcher Joe Ross and went 2-4 overall. On July 1, he hit his first major league home run, a three-run homer against Jason Hammel of the Chicago Cubs, making the game 7–1 in the bottom of the 4th inning. On July 17, Nimmo was sent down to the Triple-A Las Vegas 51s after batting .235 with one home run and 4 RBIs in 51 at-bats. On July 29, Nimmo was once again promoted after Juan Lagares suffered a torn thumb ligament and undertook surgery to repair the injury.

==== 2017–18 ====
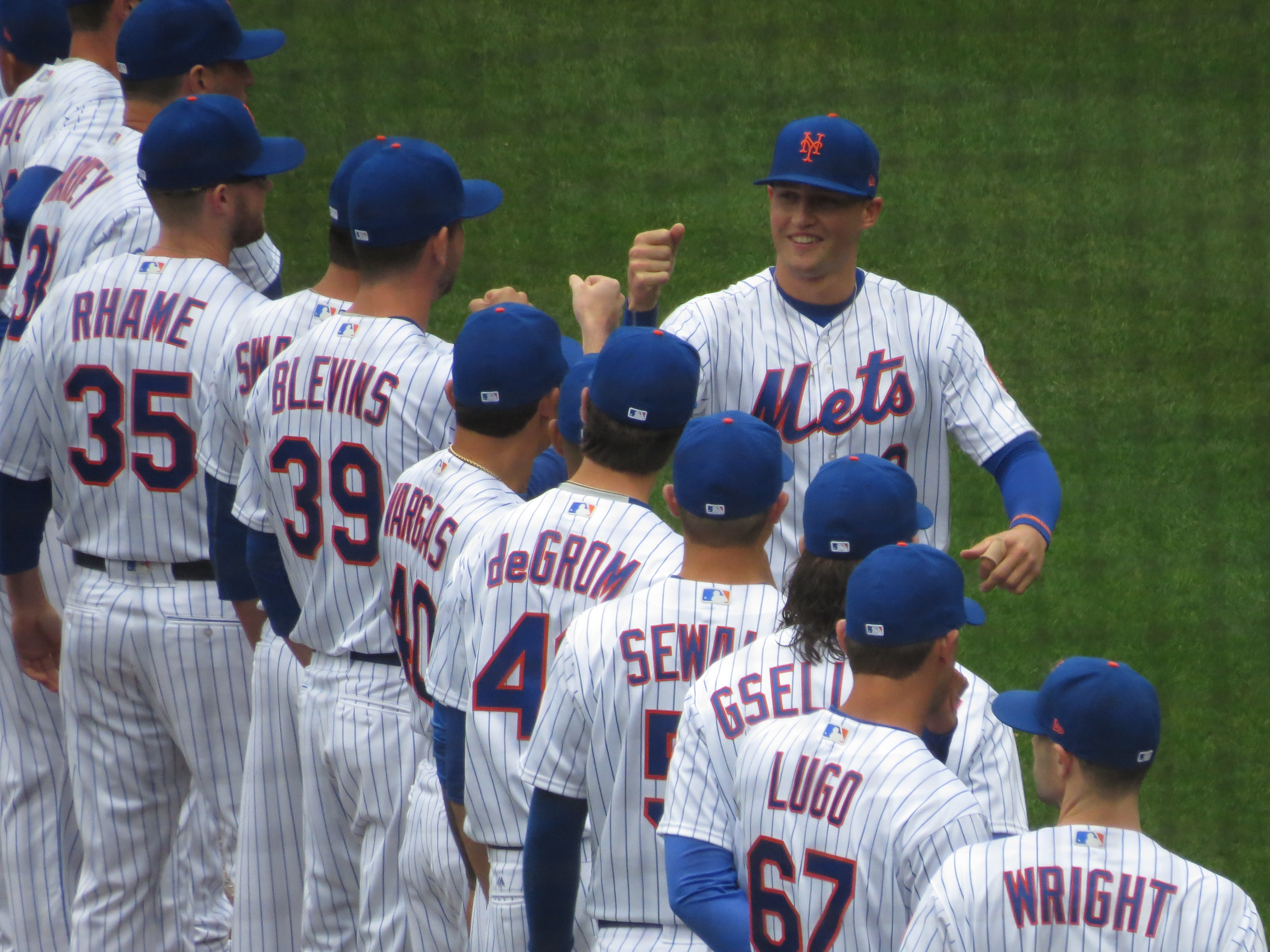
Nimmo on Opening Day 2018 at Citi Field

In 2017, Brandon Nimmo was chosen to be part of Team Italy in the World Baseball Classic. While playing in the WBC, Nimmo strained his right hamstring. The injury left him unable to join the Mets Opening Day roster, and when he recovered in late April, he began his season in the minor leagues. He remained with Las Vegas until June 16, when injuries to Juan Lagares and Matt Harvey led to Nimmo and Matt Reynolds returning to the Major Leagues. Nimmo started strong, hitting .350/.458/.400 over 24 plate appearances. However, he was placed on the disabled list with a partially collapsed lung on July 8 and would not return until July 28.

Nimmo would finish the 2017 season appearing in 69 games for the Mets, batting .260/.379/.418 with 5 home runs. Late in the year, hitting coaches Kevin Long and Pat Roessler suggested that Nimmo try hitting without his front foot striding forward. He took the suggestion, which allowed his front foot to turn open and generate better hip rotation. Up until that August, Nimmo had slugged .346 in his career. He slugged .479 in September and continued to show increased power in 2018, slugging over .500 through the season's first two months.

On June 18, 2018, Nimmo became the first Met in history to lead off a game with an inside-the-park home run, a feat he achieved against the Colorado Rockies at Coors Field. On July 11, Nimmo hit his first walk-off home run, a three-run blast off of Mark Leiter Jr. to give the Mets a 3–0 victory over the Philadelphia Phillies. In 2018, Nimmo batted .263/.404/.483, with 17 home runs and 47 RBI. He led the majors in hit by pitches, with 20.

==== 2019 ====
On April 17, 2019, Nimmo was taken out of the first inning of a game due to a stiff neck, and missed two games. On May 21, he once again experienced neck stiffness and went on the injured list. He was later found to have a bulging disk in his neck and went through a rough rehabilitation assignment, not appearing in the Mets' lineup again until September 1. In 2019, Nimmo batted .221/.375/.407 with 8 home runs and 29 RBIs in 69 games. He had the fastest home run trot of all major league players, at 17.7 seconds.

==== 2020 ====
In the pandemic-shortened 2020 season, Nimmo hit .280/.404/.484 with 8 home runs and 18 RBIs in 55 games.

==== 2021 ====
In 2021, Nimmo missed most of May and all of June due to a bruised hand. He returned to the active roster in July, but suffered a hamstring strain on September 4 and missed two weeks. He finished the 2021 season batting .292/.401/.437 with 8 home runs and 28 RBIs in 92 games.

==== 2022 ====
Nimmo finished the 2022 season batting .274/.367/.433 with 16 home runs and 64 RBIs in 151 games in center field. He also had the fourth most runs scored (102), fifth best on-base percentage (.367), and led with the most triples (7) in the National League. After the season, Nimmo became a free agent. On December 10, 2022, he signed an 8-year, $162 million contract to remain with the Mets.

==== 2023 ====
On June 8, Nimmo hit the first grand slam of his career off of Spencer Strider of the Atlanta Braves. In 2023, Nimmo batted .274/.363/.466 with 24 home runs and 68 RBI, playing 136 games in center field and 10 games in left field.

==== 2024 ====
Mets manager Carlos Mendoza said that Nimmo would play left field for the Mets in 2024 and new acquisition Harrison Bader would play center field. On June 30, 2024, during a game against the Houston Astros, Nimmo hit his 100th career home run, off of pitcher Bryan Abreu. He became the 16th player to hit at least 100 home runs in a Mets uniform. Nimmo played in 151 games for the Mets in 2024, batting .224/.327/.399 with 23 home runs and a career-high 90 RBI.

Despite suffering from plantar fasciitis during the 2024 MLB postseason, Nimmo hit the first postseason home run of his career off of Philadelphia Phillies pitcher Orion Kerkering in Game 2 of the National League Division Series.

==== 2025 ====
On April 28, 2025, during a game against the Washington Nationals, Nimmo hit two home runs (including a grand slam) and a two-run RBI double for a grand total of 9 RBI on the day, tying the Mets single-game franchise record set by Carlos Delgado in 2008. On August 26, Nimmo laced a walk-off RBI single against Jhoan Duran and the Philadelphia Phillies. On September 23, Nimmo hit his 135th career home run off of Taylor Rogers of the Chicago Cubs, passing John Buck for the most home runs ever hit by a native of Wyoming. Across 155 games for the Mets in 2025, Nimmo batted .262/.324/.436 with 25 home runs and 92 RBI, both career-highs.

=== Texas Rangers ===
On November 24, 2025, the Mets traded Nimmo and cash considerations to the Texas Rangers in exchange for Marcus Semien.

==== 2026 ====
In his first season with the Rangers, Nimmo batted .260/.324/.405 with 14 home runs, 62 RBIs and a career-high 36 doubles in 155 games.

== Personal life ==
Nimmo married Chelsea Bradley in November 2017 in Savannah, Georgia. Their first child, a daughter, was born in November 2024. Nimmo is a Christian.

Nimmo made multiple donations to Donald Trump and the Republican National Committee in 2020.
