= T. J. Rivera =

American baseball player (born 1988)

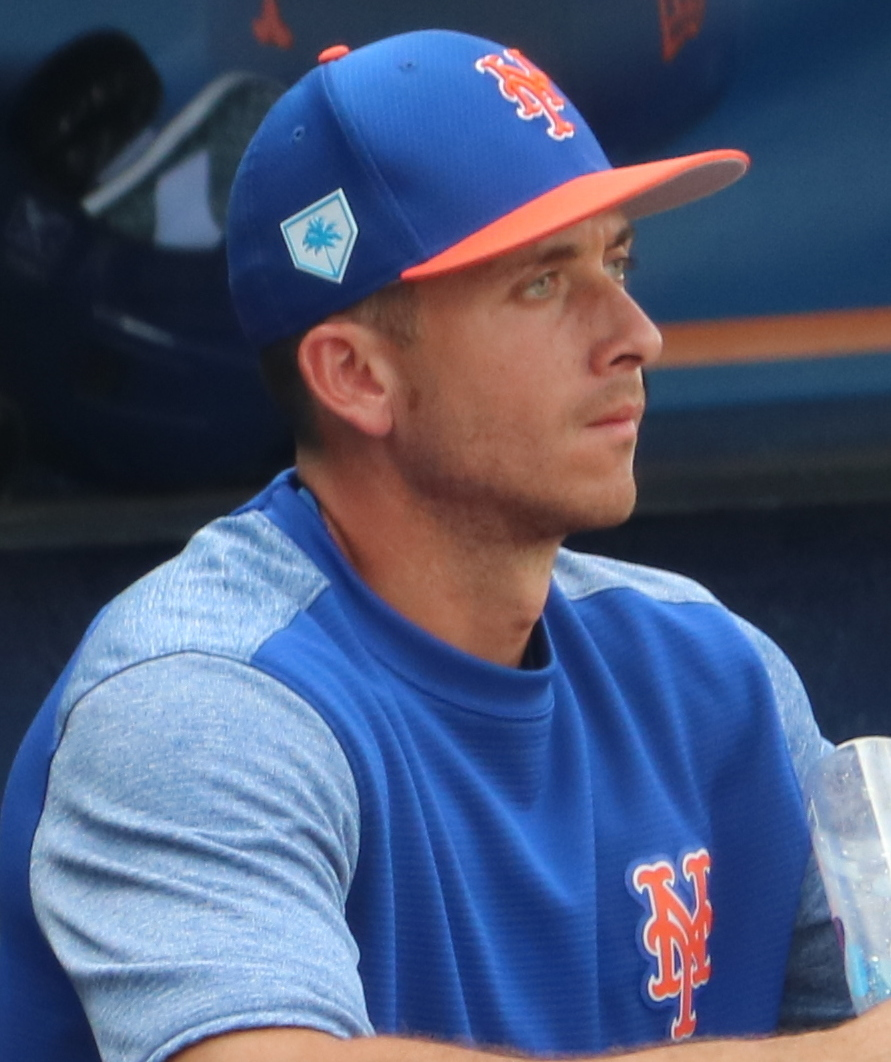
- Rivera with the Mets in 2019
- Infielder
- Born: October 27, 1988 (age 38); The Bronx, New York, U.S.
- Batted: Right Threw: Right

MLB debut
- August 15, 2016, for the New York Mets

Last appearance
- July 26, 2017, for the New York Mets

MLB statistics
- Batting average: .304
- Home runs: 8
- Runs batted in: 43
- Stats at Baseball Reference

Teams
- New York Mets (2016–2017)
Medals
Men's baseball
Representing Puerto Rico
World Baseball Classic
Silver medal – second place	2017 Los Angeles	National team

Thomas Javier Rivera (born October 27, 1988) is an American former professional baseball infielder and current coach. He played in Major League Baseball (MLB) for the New York Mets. Rivera is a native of New York City, and went undrafted after playing college baseball at Troy University. He made his MLB debut in 2016, and played for the Puerto Rican national baseball team in the 2017 World Baseball Classic.

== Personal life ==
Rivera was born to Tommy, a handyman, and Nilsa Rivera, an insurance adjuster. Rivera is of Puerto Rican descent. His mother and father are from Aibonito and Ponce, Puerto Rico. He represented Puerto Rico at the 2017 World Baseball Classic. Rivera grew up as a fan of the New York Yankees, but also liked the Mets. Rivera met his wife, Ashton, at Troy University.

== Amateur career ==
Rivera grew up in the Throgs Neck neighborhood of the Bronx. He played in local little leagues in Throgs Neck and Parkchester, and often played sports including baseball on concrete fields or in the street. In 2001 at the age of 12, Rivera played in a Little League district championship, eliminated by Danny Almonte and the "Baby Bombers" who went on to the Little League World Series. (The Baby Bombers had their wins wiped out retroactively due to the Almonte fraud.)

Rivera attended Herbert H. Lehman High School in eastern Bronx. After attending tryouts using a softball glove and playing junior varsity his freshman year, he went on to play varsity for three seasons while batting over .600 his junior and senior years. Rivera began his college baseball career at Fairleigh Dickinson University in New Jersey where he then transferred to Wallace Community College in the Alabama Community College Conference, in Dothan, Alabama. Rivera chose Wallace in order to play against tougher competition in warmer weather. After two seasons, Rivera transferred to Troy University in Troy, Alabama, where he played for the Troy Trojans. He graduated from Troy in 2011 majoring in criminal justice, but went unselected in the Major League Baseball draft.

== Professional career ==
=== New York Mets ===
Former Mets catcher Mackey Sasser, Rivera's head coach at Wallace Community, recommended him to a scout for the New York Mets, who then signed him as a free agent.

Rivera had a .301 batting average in 2011, splitting the season between the Kingsport Mets of the Rookie-level Appalachian League and the Brooklyn Cyclones of the Low–A New York–Penn League. In 2014, Rivera hit .349 with five home runs and 75 runs batted in (RBI) for the St. Lucie Mets of the High–A Florida State League and the Binghamton Mets of the Double–A Eastern League. He returned to Binghamton to start the 2015 season, and was promoted to the Las Vegas 51s of the Triple–A Pacific Coast League (PCL) on May 16. Despite hitting .306 with 17 doubles in 54 games, the Mets demoted Rivera to Binghamton on August 1. The Mets chose not to add Rivera to their 40-man roster after the 2015 season, exposing him to the Rule 5 draft; he went unselected.

The Mets invited Rivera to spring training in 2016. He began the 2016 season with Las Vegas. He was named the PCL's Player of the Month for May, when he batted .373 with five home runs. He ended the season as the PCL batting champion.

After batting .349 with 11 home runs and 90 RBI for Las Vegas, and being named the PCL's Player of the Week for August 1 through 7, the Mets promoted Rivers to the Major Leagues for the first time on August 10. He made his debut that night, starting at third base, and collected his first Major League hit in his debut. He had a two–run double against the San Diego Padres for the first two runs batted in of his Major League career. Rivera hit his first major league home run on September 13, a go-ahead solo shot in the tenth inning off of Mark Melancon of the Washington Nationals. Rivera batted .333 in 33 games for the Mets. He became the Mets' everyday second baseman toward the end of the season, after injuries suffered by Neil Walker and Wilmer Flores, and started the National League Wild Card game.

In 2017, Rivera was named to his first ever Major League Opening Day roster. He was sent down to Triple–A on June 11 to make room for Yoenis Céspedes, but recalled on June 13 after Asdrúbal Cabrera went on the disabled list. The Mets placed Rivera on the 10-day disabled list on July 28, after a partial tear in his right ulnar collateral ligament. He underwent Tommy John surgery towards the end of the 2017 campaign. He hoped to return to the Mets around midseason, but an elbow sprain suffered while playing rehabilitation games in the minor leagues ended his season. He recorded 22 plate appearances in the minor leagues during the 2018 season.

Rivera continued to struggle with his rehabilitation during spring training in 2019. On March 9, 2019, the Mets released Rivera.

=== Long Island Ducks ===
Rivera was signed by the Long Island Ducks of the Atlantic League on July 6, 2019. In 23 games for the Ducks, he slashed .270/.316/.427 with four home runs and 16 RBI.

=== Washington Nationals ===
On August 4, 2019, Rivera's contract was purchased by the Washington Nationals organization. In 15 games for the Double–A Harrisburg Senators, he batted .237/.293/.316 with no home runs and four RBI. Rivera elected free agency following the season on November 4.

=== Philadelphia Phillies ===
On December 15, 2019, Rivera signed a minor league contract with the Philadelphia Phillies. He did not play in a game in 2020 due to the cancellation of the minor league season because of the COVID-19 pandemic. Rivera was released by the Phillies organization on May 28, 2020.

=== Pittsburgh Pirates ===
On May 10, 2021, Rivera signed with the Long Island Ducks of the Atlantic League of Professional Baseball.

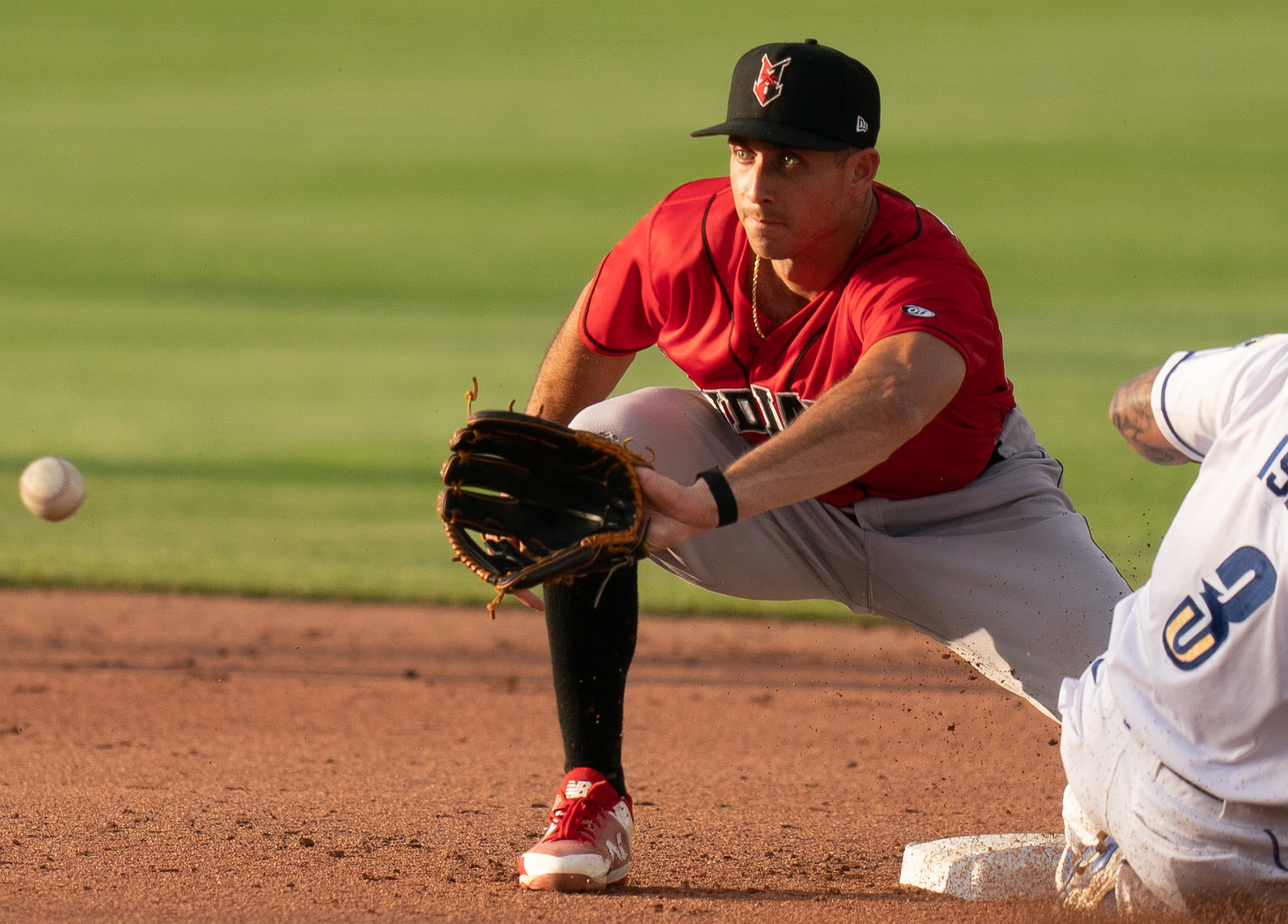
Rivera with the Indianapolis Indians in 2021

However, on May 14, before the ALPB season began, Rivera agreed to a minor league contract with the Pittsburgh Pirates.

=== Philadelphia Phillies (second stint) ===
On August 7, 2021, Rivera was traded to the Philadelphia Phillies.

== Coaching career ==
On May 14, 2022, Rivera retired and was hired as a coach by the Cleveland Guardians. Rivera served as manager of the Arizona Complex League Guardians for the 2023 season.

== International career ==
Rivera played for the Puerto Rican national baseball team in the 2017 World Baseball Classic as their first baseman.

== Scouting report ==
Rivera was known as a contact hitter with a compact line drive swing. Rivera hit for a high average throughout his career, batting over .300 at the minor league level. He however did not hit for power or draw frequent walks, qualities which are highly valued in the sabermetric era. Rivera credited playing wiffle ball as a youth with creating his swing. Rivera played second, third, and first base at the Major League level, and previously played shortstop in college and the minors. He considered second base his natural position.
