= Wilmer Flores (pitcher) =

Venezuelan baseball player (born 2001)

Free agent
- Pitcher
- Born: February 20, 2001 (age 25); Valencia, Venezuela
- Bats: Right Throws: Right
- Stats at Baseball Reference

Wilmer De Jesus Flores (born February 20, 2001) is a Venezuelan professional baseball pitcher who is a free agent.

== Career ==
Flores played college baseball at Arizona Western College. Flores signed with the Detroit Tigers as an undrafted free agent on July 10, 2020. He did not play in a game in 2020 due to the cancellation of the minor league season because of the COVID-19 pandemic.

Flores spent his first professional season in 2021 with the rookie-level Florida Complex League Tigers and Single-A Lakeland Flying Tigers, posting a cumulative 6–4 record and 3.68 ERA with 90 strikeouts in 14 games (13 starts). After the season he played in the Arizona Fall League. Flores started 2022 with the High-A West Michigan Whitecaps.

On November 14, 2023, the Tigers added Flores to their 40-man roster to protect him from the Rule 5 draft. He was optioned to the Triple-A Toledo Mud Hens to begin the 2024 season. On November 22, 2024, Flores was designated for assignment by Detroit. The Tigers non-tendered Flores the same day, making him a free agent.

On December 5, 2024, Flores re-signed with the Tigers on a minor league contract. He was released on September 11, 2025.

== Personal life ==
His brother, also named Wilmer Flores, played in Major League Baseball.
