= Wilmer Flores =

Venezuelan baseball player (born 1991)

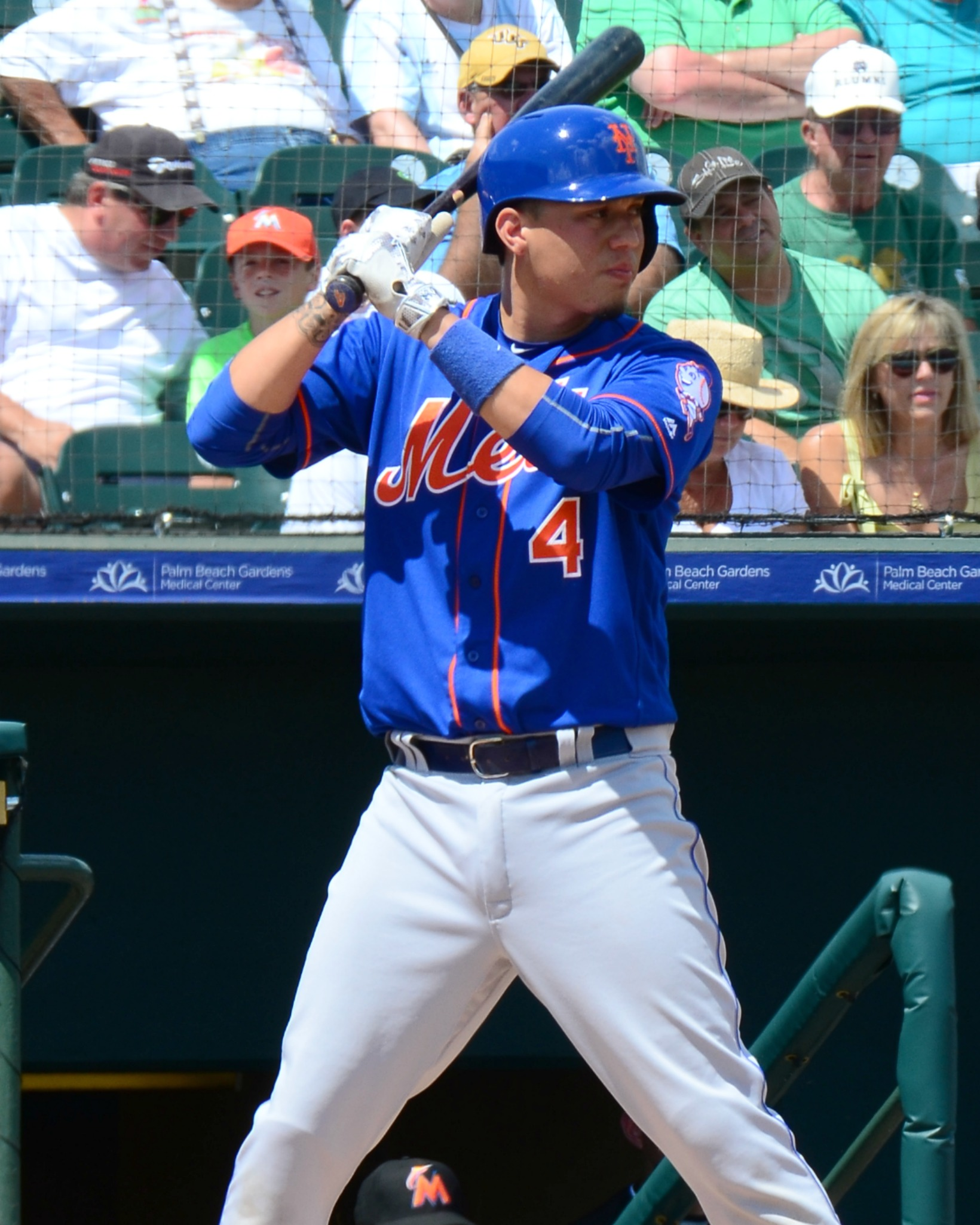
- Flores with the New York Mets in 2016

Toros de Tijuana – No. 41
- Infielder
- Born: August 6, 1991 (age 35); Valencia, Venezuela
- Bats: Right Throws: Right

MLB debut
- August 6, 2013, for the New York Mets

MLB statistics (through 2025 season)
- Batting average: .259
- Hits: 1,107
- Home runs: 169
- Runs batted in: 603
- Stats at Baseball Reference

Teams
- New York Mets (2013–2018); Arizona Diamondbacks (2019); San Francisco Giants (2020–2025)

Wilmer Alejandro Flores García (born August 6, 1991), nicknamed "Catire", is a Venezuelan professional baseball infielder for the Toros de Tijuana of the Mexican League. He previously played in Major League Baseball (MLB) for the New York Mets, Arizona Diamondbacks, and San Francisco Giants. On his 16th birthday in 2007, Flores signed as an international free agent with the Mets, and he made his major-league debut with them in 2013.

== Early life ==
Flores was born on August 6, 1991, in Valencia, Venezuela, to Soledy García and Wilmer Flores. He has three brothers and two sisters. His family nicknamed him "Catire" to his blonde hair as a baby. Growing up in Valencia, Venezuela, Flores first picked up a bat at age 6 and taught himself how to swing. After he turned 13, an agent, impressed with his power, steered him toward the nearby Agua Linda Academy, where he received formal instruction for the first time.

He has two brothers also named Wilmer Flores, one of whom is a pitcher in the Detroit Tigers organization.

== Professional career ==
=== Minor leagues ===
Flores signed as an international free agent with the New York Mets on August 6, 2007, his 16th birthday. With his $750,000 signing bonus, he bought his mother a new Hyundai Sonata he did not know how to drive. He was rated in the top 100 prospects by Baseball America prior to the 2009 (#47), 2010 (#88), and 2011 (#59) seasons.

Flores started at second base for the World team at the 2009 All-Star Futures Game. He also was named to the Baseball America Rookie All-Star Team (2008), the APP Postseason All-Star Team (2008), the MiLB.com Organization All-Star Team (2010), and the South Atlantic League All-Star Team (2010).

In 2011, the Mets sent Flores back to the St. Lucie Mets of the High–A Florida State League (FSL) to convert him from a shortstop into a third baseman. In 2012, Flores was selected at third base for the FSL All-Star Game. He went 3-for-4 with a run scored and three runs batted in, earning Most Valuable Player honors. He also appeared in the All-Star Futures Game for the second time in his career. The Mets promoted Flores to the Binghamton Mets of the Double–A Eastern League during the 2012 season. He finished the 2012 season with Binghamton batting .311/.361/.494 in 66 games with eight home runs, 33 RBI, and 20 walks.

Flores began the 2013 season with the Las Vegas 51s of the Triple–A Pacific Coast League. He finished batting .321/.357/.531 in 107 games with 15 home runs, 86 RBI, and 25 walks.

=== New York Mets (2013–2018) ===
==== 2013 ====
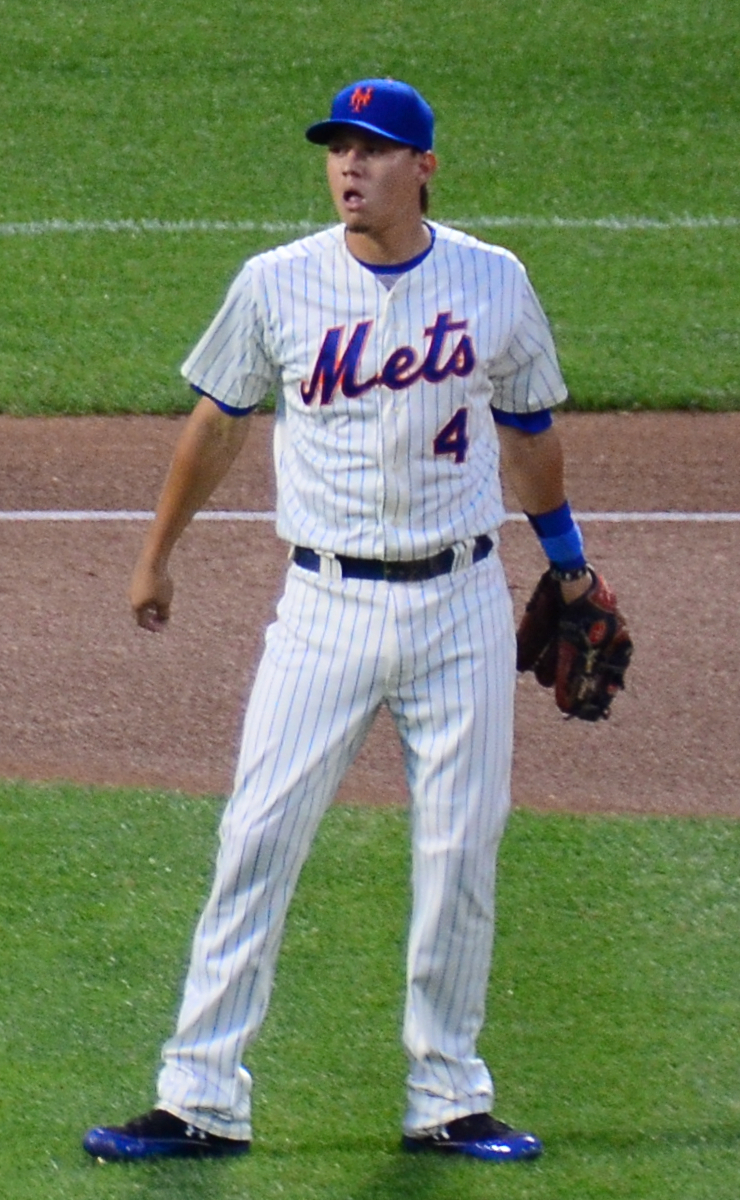
Flores with the New York Mets in 2013

He obtained a promotion to the Mets' major league roster on August 6, his 22nd birthday. Pitcher Bobby Parnell was placed on the disabled list with a herniated disk in his neck, a roster spot filled by Flores. He made his debut that day against the Colorado Rockies at Citi Field, going 0-for-4 at the plate and committing an error in the sixth inning, in what would be a 3–2 Mets win. On August 7, he notched his first career major league hit, a single in the bottom of the second inning off Rockies pitcher Jhoulys Chacín. In the bottom of the eight inning, he hit a base clearing double off pitcher Manny Corpas for his first three major league RBI. The Mets would go on to win 5–0. On August 11, he hit his first career home run, a solo home run to right field off Arizona Diamondbacks pitcher Heath Bell in the top of the ninth inning, to extend the Mets lead to 9–5, which became the final score. He finished the 2013 season appearing in 27 games, with a batting average of .211 in 95 at-bats and 101 plate appearances, while compiling 20 hits, 13 RBI, one home run, five walks, eight runs scored, and striking out 23 times.

==== 2014 ====
Flores started the 2014 season with the Las Vegas 51s in AAA, but was called up April 2 along with Kyle Farnsworth in order to replace Bobby Parnell going to the disabled list and with Daniel Murphy on paternity leave. He would be re-sent back to the 51s on April 6 to make room for Jon Niese coming off the disabled list. Flores had only started one game, playing second base while going 0-for-4 with two strikeouts. He was recalled on May 9, with Omar Quintanilla being designated for assignment. On June 2, Flores drove in a career high 6 RBI during which he also hit his first career grand slam against the Philadelphia Phillies at Citizens Bank Park. The grand slam came in the top of the ninth inning off pitcher Phillippe Aumont with two outs, extending the lead to 11–2. On June 26, Flores was once again re-sent down to the 51s to make room for Juan Lagares coming off the disabled list. He was recalled for good on July 24, with Kirk Nieuwenhuis being sent to the 51s. Flores finished the 2014 season appearing in 78 games with a batting average of .251 in 259 at-bats in 274 plate appearances while compiling 65 hits, 29 RBI, 6 home runs, 12 walks, 28 runs scored and striking out 31 times.

==== 2015 ====
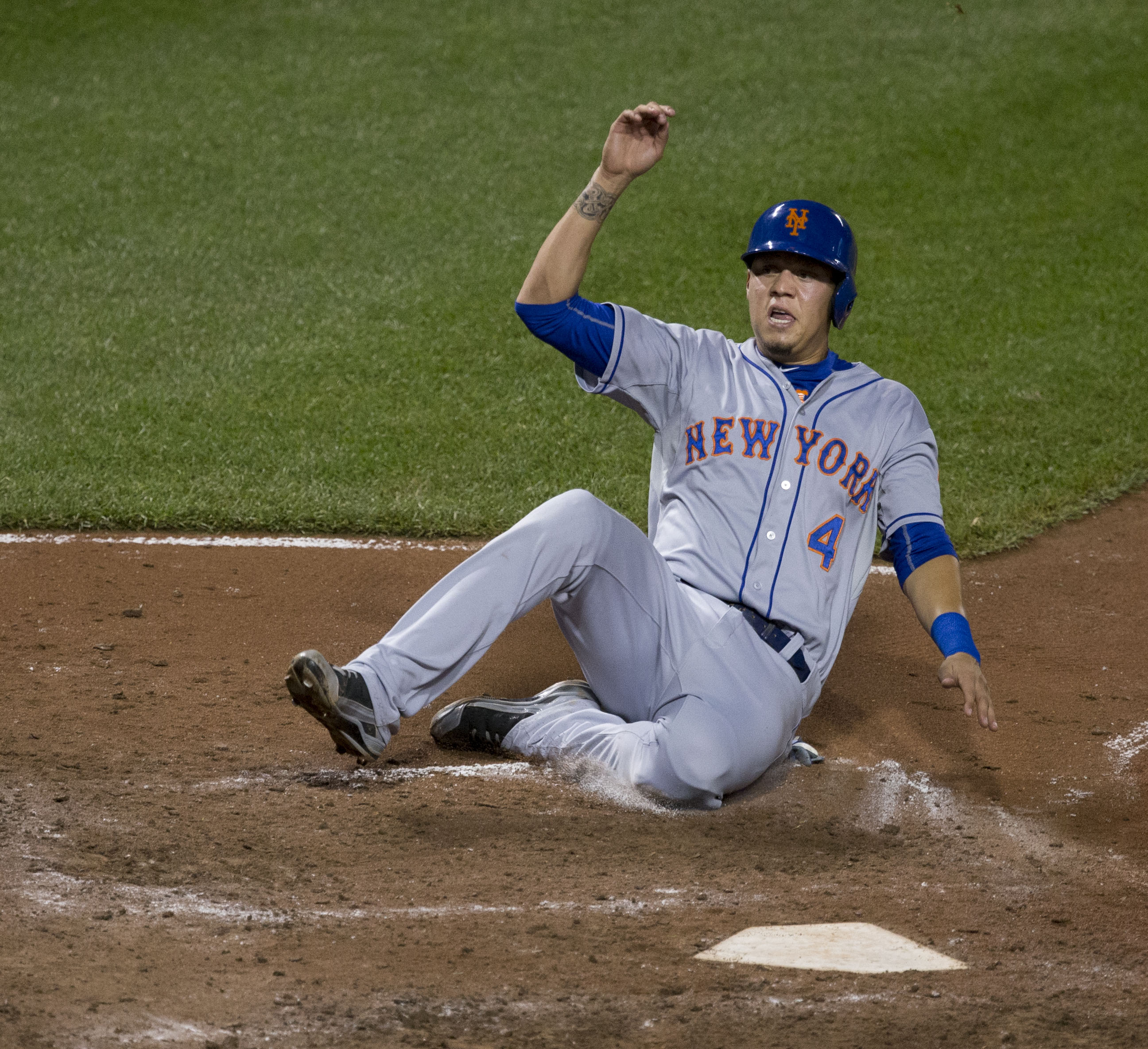
Flores sliding in a run against the Baltimore Orioles on August 18, 2015.

Flores made the Mets' roster for Opening Day in 2015. During the first week of the season, Flores struggled offensively and defensively as he made three errors and batted .158 in seven games. In nine games after the opening week, Flores batted .364 with three home runs. Soon thereafter, Flores was tied for third in all of baseball in errors committed, with six. On May 16, Flores became the first National League position player to hit a grand slam batting ninth in a National League ballpark. The home run came off Milwaukee Brewers pitcher Matt Garza at Citi Field. It was his second career grand slam. On May 26, Flores was tied for most home runs hit by a shortstop with Jhonny Peralta of the St. Louis Cardinals with seven. That same day, Flores hit his first career walk-off, a single, off Phillies' pitcher Elvis Araújo in the bottom of the tenth inning with two outs scoring Juan Lagares for his second RBI of the game.

On July 29, rumors spread during a game against the San Diego Padres that Flores had been traded to the Milwaukee Brewers, along with pitcher Zack Wheeler, for Carlos Gómez. Despite the rumors, Flores remained in the game, and was visibly emotional when he returned to the field as fans began to give him a standing ovation. Flores later explained his disappointment in learning that he would be leaving the only baseball organization he has ever known. However, following the game, General Manager Sandy Alderson informed the media that no trade had occurred, stating that "social media got ahead of the facts". After the game, Mets' manager Terry Collins told the media that he knew nothing about the potential trade, and had told Flores while the events played out, "Listen, I don't know what's going on, but you've got a game to play, let's play baseball." It was later reported that the Mets backed out of the trade after a concern about Gómez's physical as a medical report showed an issue with his hip.

Two days later, on July 31, Flores hit his first career walk-off home run, a solo home run, off Washington Nationals pitcher Felipe Rivero. It occurred in the bottom of the 12th inning, on a 1–1 count with no outs, winning an important game for the Mets by a score of 2–1. As Flores approached home plate finishing his circle around the bases, he memorably tugged enthusiastically at the "Mets" logo on his uniform front, signifying how happy he was to have remained with the team. Flores had also driven in the other Mets' run earlier in the game. During each at-bat, Flores received a standing ovation from the Mets' fans. The win brought the Mets within two games of first place in the NL East. After the incident, Flores became a fan-favorite of Mets fans and was given standing ovations in the subsequent weeks, both at home and at away games. It was also the only walk-off home run the Mets hit during the 2015 season. At this point on August 25, since the failed trade, he hit .343 with a .993 OPS and four home runs. The Mets went 16–6 after that day.

Flores finished the 2015 season appearing in 137 games with a batting average of .263 in 483 at-bats in 510 plate appearances. He compiled 127 hits, 16 home runs, 59 RBI, 55 runs scored, 19 walks, and struck out 63 times. His walk percentage of 3.7% was in the bottom 4% of MLB players.

In the NLDS against the Los Angeles Dodgers, Flores hit .300 in four games, compiling three hits, one double, two walks, two runs scored, and striking out four times. During the series against the Dodgers, Mets' shortstop Ruben Tejada was injured by the Dodgers' Chase Utley. The injury occurred with a controversial slide, thought dirty by many, and resulted in a broken leg for Tejada. Flores played shortstop for the remainder of the postseason. Then, playing against the Chicago Cubs in the NLCS, he batted .286 in four games compiling four hits, one double, one triple, one walk, one stolen base, and striking out two times. However, after he moved to the more important defensive position, Flores played fine defense, but struggled hitting. He was the last out of the World Series, striking out looking in game five against Kansas City Royals closer Wade Davis, to clinch the series for the Royals. Flores appeared in all five games, batting .059 with one hit, one runs scored, two walks, and three strikeouts.

In December, Flores suffered a broken left ankle after being hit by a pitch in winter ball in Venezuela.

==== 2016 ====
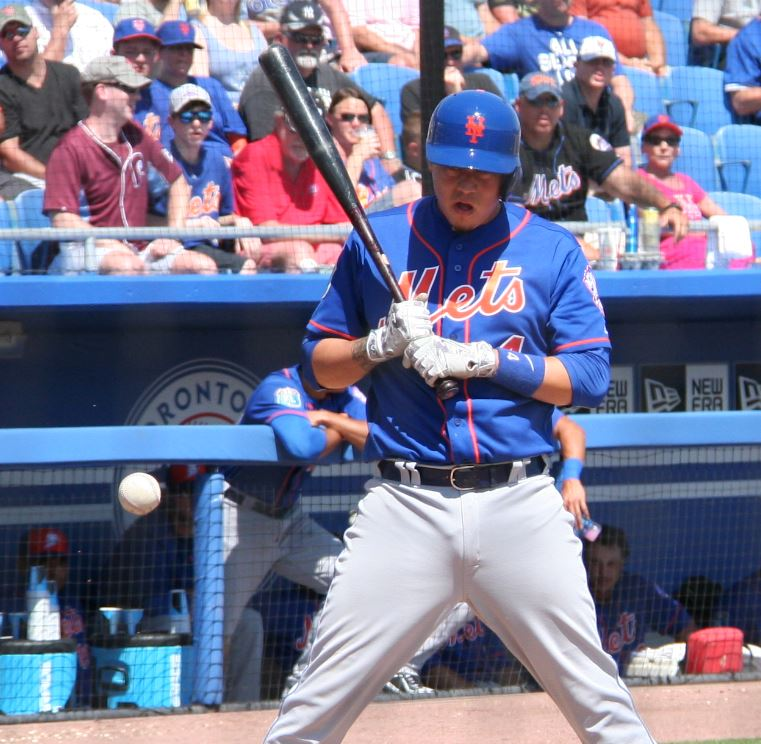
Flores during spring training in 2016

On May 12, Flores was put on the 15-day disabled list with a left hamstring injury, with his spot on the roster being taken by Sean Gilmartin. Flores was batting .180 with one home run and two RBI in 50 at-bats playing at first, second, and third base filling in as a defensive replacement for Lucas Duda, Neil Walker, and David Wright respectively. Flores was activated from the DL on May 29, with Matt Reynolds being sent down to make room for him on the roster. In five rehab games with the Binghamton Mets, Flores had batted .235 with one RBI and four hits.

On July 3, in a home game against the Cubs, Flores became only the second Mets player to collect six hits in a game, the first being fellow Venezuelan infielder Edgardo Alfonzo, who did so in August 1999. In doing so, he raised his batting average 31 points from .224 to .255. He became the first player in Major League Baseball to accomplish the feat since C. J. Cron the day earlier and the first player in the National League to do so since Charlie Blackmon on April 4, 2014.

On September 10, Flores injured his wrist in a collision at home plate with Atlanta Braves catcher A. J. Pierzynski. On September 30, the Mets announced that Flores would miss the rest of the year, including the postseason. On October 7, Flores underwent surgery to have part of the hamate bone in his wrist removed.

In 2016 he batted .267/.319/.469.

==== 2017 ====
On April 21, the Mets placed Flores on the 10-day disabled list with an infection in his knee which required hospitalization and IV treatment. Flores broke his nose on a foul-tip in the second game of a double-header against the Houston Astros on September 2, which ended his season. For his 2017 campaign, Flores finished batting .271/.307/.488 with 18 home runs and 52 runs batted in in 336 at-bats. On defense, while primarily playing third base, he had an "outs above average" rating of -9, in the bottom 4% of MLB players.

==== 2018 ====
On April 15, 2018, Flores hit a walk-off home run to give the Mets a win against the Brewers. This was his third career walk-off home run. On June 26, Flores drove in the winning run against the Pittsburgh Pirates in the bottom of the 10th inning, giving the Mets a 4–3 victory. Earlier in the game, he had driven in the Mets' first two runs as well. Flores's game winner was his 9th walk-off RBI of his young career. He tied David Wright for the most walk-off RBI in Mets' history. On July 9, in the first game of a doubleheader against the Philadelphia Phillies, Flores hit a pinch-hit walk-off home run, breaking Wright's record for the most walk-off RBI of any player in Mets franchise history. In 2018, he batted .267/.319/.417. He struck out only 9.8% of the time, in the best 2% of MLB players.

After the season, Flores was non-tendered by the Mets, making him a free agent.

=== Arizona Diamondbacks (2019) ===
On January 21, 2019, Flores signed a one-year, $4.25 million contract with the Arizona Diamondbacks. He played in 89 games for the Diamondbacks in 2019, hitting .317/.361/.487 with 9 home runs and 37 RBI in 265 at-bats. On September 9, Flores hit a home run off of former teammate Jacob deGrom in his return to Citi Field and was met with cheers. Flores also received a homecoming video from the team before the game, the first player to receive one since Daniel Murphy in 2016.

=== San Francisco Giants (2020–2025) ===
==== 2020 ====
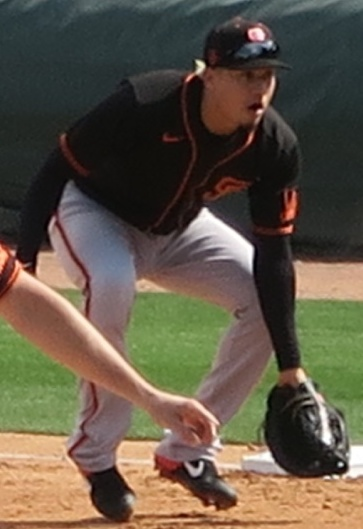
Flores in February 2020

On February 4, 2020, Flores signed a two-year, $6 million contract including a third-year option with the San Francisco Giants. In the COVID-shortened 2020 season, Flores led the team in home runs with 12 and finished second on the team in RBI (32) and runs (30), as he batted .268/.315/.515 in 198 at-bats. He played 14 games at first base, 14 games at second base, and three games at third base.

==== 2021 ====
In the 2021 regular season, Flores batted .262/.335/.447 with a career-high 57 runs, 18 home runs, and 53 RBI in 389 at-bats. He struck out only 12.8% of the time, in the best 3% of MLB players. He played 58 games at third base, 34 games at first base, and 30 games at second base.

==== 2022 ====
In 2022, Flores batted .229/.316/.394 in 525 at–bats, with 72 runs, 19 home runs, and 71 RBI. He played 61 games at second base, 45 at first base, 34 at third base, and 26 at DH. On September 12, he signed a two-year contract extension with the Giants, with a mutual option for a third year.

Flores received the Willie Mac Award on September 30, voted on annually by Giants teammates, coaches, trainers, and fans for performance on the field and off the field.

==== 2023 ====
Flores played in 126 games for San Francisco in 2023, slashing .284/.355/.509 with a career–high 23 home runs and 60 RBI.

==== 2024 ====
Flores played in 71 games for San Francisco in 2024, batting .206/.277/.318 with four home runs and 26 RBI. On August 6, 2024, manager Bob Melvin announced that Flores would miss the remainder of the season after undergoing a Tenex procedure to treat right knee tendinitis. On November 2, 2024, Flores exercised his option clause, allowing him to remain with the team.

==== 2025 ====
On May 16, 2025, Flores had his first career three-home run game, including his seventh career grand slam, and scored a career-high eight RBI against the Athletics. Flores became the first Giants player to record at least 40 RBI through the team's first 45 games since Barry Bonds in 2001 (45). Flores made 125 appearances for San Francisco, slashing .241/.307/.379 with 16 home runs and 71 RBI.

=== Toros de Tijuana (2026–present) ===
On March 19, 2026, Flores signed with the Toros de Tijuana of the Mexican League.

== Personal life ==
In February 2023, Flores and his girlfriend, Ivonelis Navas, welcomed a son named Wilmer Jose Flores in Miami.

== See also ==
- List of Major League Baseball players from Venezuela
