= Josh Smoker =

American baseball pitcher (born 1988)

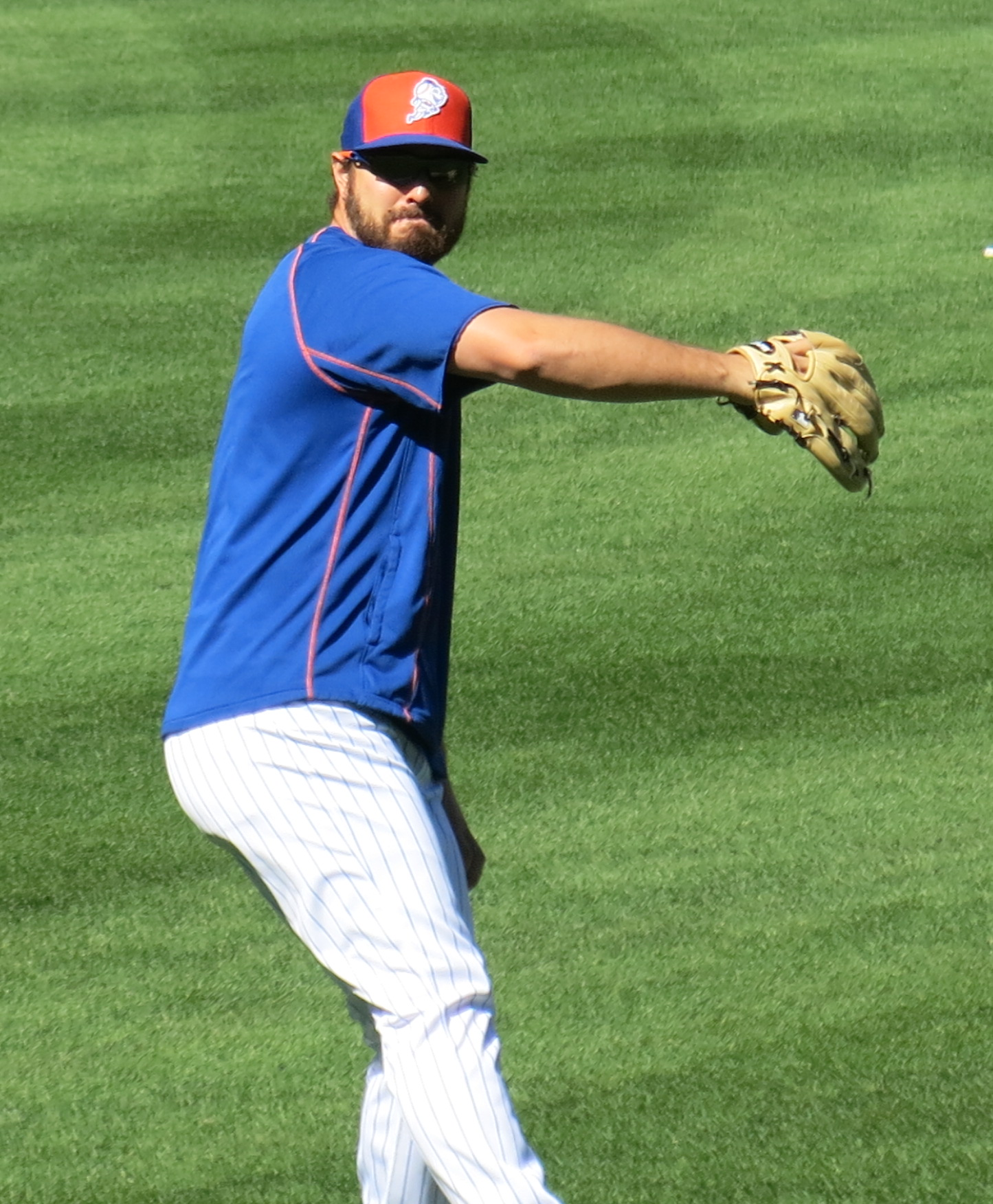
- Smoker with the Mets in 2016
- Pitcher
- Born: November 26, 1988 (age 37); Calhoun, Georgia, U.S.
- Batted: Left Threw: Left

MLB debut
- August 19, 2016, for the New York Mets

Last MLB appearance
- August 26, 2018, for the Detroit Tigers

MLB statistics
- Win–loss record: 4–2
- Earned run average: 5.35
- Strikeouts: 97
- Stats at Baseball Reference

Teams
- New York Mets (2016–2017); Pittsburgh Pirates (2018); Detroit Tigers (2018)

Joshua Michael Smoker (born November 26, 1988) is an American former professional baseball pitcher. He played in Major League Baseball (MLB) for the New York Mets, Pittsburgh Pirates, and Detroit Tigers.

== Early life ==
Smoker was born in Calhoun, Georgia to Mike, an engineer, and Debbie Smoker. As a child, he was an Atlanta Braves fan and dirt track racer.

In 2007, Smoker was rated the eleventh best draft-eligible pitching prospect by Baseball America. As a high school senior, he was named Gatorade Player of the Year for Georgia after finishing with a 1.24 ERA and 152 strikeouts over 73 innings pitched. He initially committed to play college baseball for Clemson.

== Professional career ==
=== Washington Nationals ===
Smoker was drafted by the Washington Nationals in the first round of the 2007 Major League Baseball draft out of Calhoun High School in Calhoun, Georgia. In 2008, he underwent surgery on a bone spur in his shoulder. In 2013, Dr. James Andrews performed surgery on Smoker to repair a torn rotator cuff and labrum. With his fastball velocity declining, the Nationals organization released him without him ever having played higher than Class A-Advanced.

=== Rockford Aviators ===
After sitting out 2013 while recovering from surgery, Smoker played for the Rockford Aviators of the Frontier League in 2014.

=== New York Mets ===
In 2015, he signed with the New York Mets.

Smoker was promoted to the Major Leagues on August 19, 2016, and made his debut that day. He picked up his first Major League win on August 29 after pitching a scoreless tenth inning against the Miami Marlins at Citi Field. In 2017, Smoker was named to his first ever Opening Day roster. He was designated for assignment on January 26, 2018.

=== Pittsburgh Pirates ===
On January 31, Smoker was traded to the Pittsburgh Pirates for Daniel Zamora and cash considerations. Smoker was designated for assignment on July 23, 2018.

=== Detroit Tigers ===
On July 28, 2018, Smoker was claimed off waivers by the Detroit Tigers. He was assigned to the Tigers' Triple-A affiliate, the Toledo Mud Hens. On August 26, 2018, the Tigers called up Smoker and he made his Tigers debut. On September 6, 2018, the Tigers released Smoker.

=== Los Angeles Dodgers ===
On October 10, 2018, Smoker signed a minor league deal with the Los Angeles Dodgers. He was assigned to Triple-A Oklahoma City to start the 2019 season. He was released on May 7, 2019.

=== York Revolution ===
August 9, 2019, Smoker signed with the York Revolution of the Atlantic League of Professional Baseball. He became a free agent following the 2019 season. On April 6, 2020, he re-signed with the Revolution for the 2020 season. Smoker did not play in a game in 2020 due to the cancellation of the ALPB season because of the COVID-19 pandemic and became a free agent after the year.

== Personal life ==
Smoker married his high school sweetheart, Nicole, in December 2014.
