= Juan Lagares =

Dominican baseball player (born 1989)

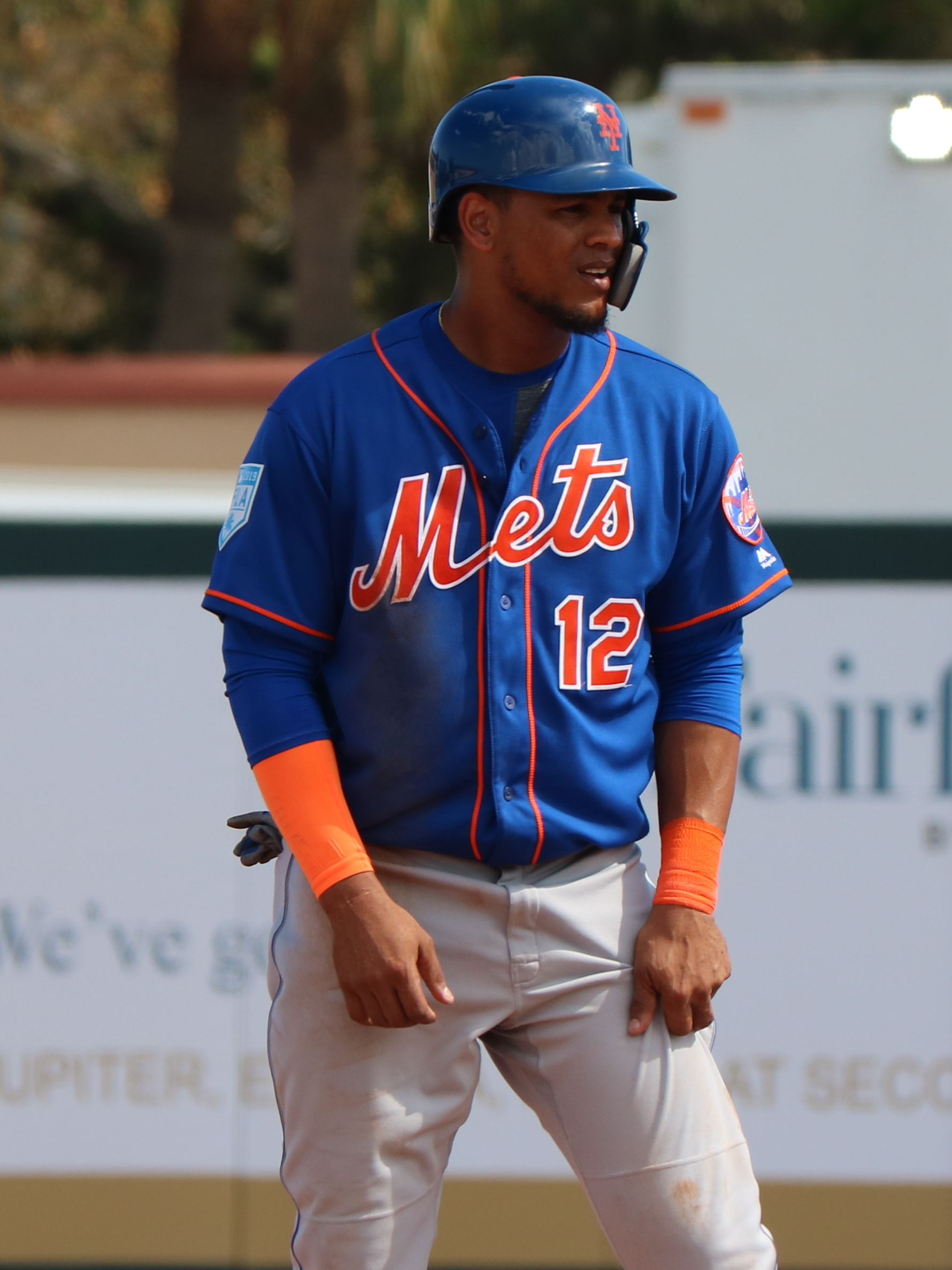
- Lagares with the New York Mets in 2019
- Center fielder
- Born: March 17, 1989 (age 37); Constanza, Dominican Republic
- Batted: Right Threw: Right

Professional debut
- MLB: April 23, 2013, for the New York Mets
- KBO: July 12, 2022, for the SSG Landers

Last appearance
- MLB: June 22, 2022, for the Los Angeles Angels
- KBO: September 30, 2022, for the SSG Landers

MLB statistics
- Batting average: .250
- Home runs: 31
- Runs batted in: 217

KBO statistics
- Batting average: .315
- Home runs: 6
- Runs batted in: 32
- Stats at Baseball Reference

Teams
- New York Mets (2013–2020); Los Angeles Angels (2021–2022); SSG Landers (2022)

Career highlights and awards
- Korean Series champion (2022); Gold Glove Award (2014)

Juan Osvaldo Lagares (born March 17, 1989) is a Dominican former professional baseball center fielder. He played in Major League Baseball (MLB) for the New York Mets, Los Angeles Angels, and in the KBO League for the SSG Landers. Known for his defensive prowess, he won the National League Gold Glove Award in 2014.

== Early life ==
Lagares grew up in a cool, mountainous area in Constanza, Dominican Republic. There were few baseball facilities or teams in the area so Lagares grew up playing softball. He has credited his arm strength to his background in throwing the larger, heavier softball. Lagares did not transition to playing baseball until he was already a teenager. After only seven or eight months practicing at a baseball academy, he was signed as a shortstop by the New York Mets.

== Professional career ==
=== New York Mets ===
Lagares was signed by the New York Mets as a non-drafted free agent on May 5, 2006. Lagares was moved from shortstop to the outfield in 2009. He was assigned to the Dominican Summer League Mets in 2006. In 57 games, he hit .255/.339/.412 with 18 XBH, 33 runs batted in, and 12 stolen bases.

In 2007, Lagares was promoted to Single-A Savannah, wherein 83 games, he hit .210/.262/.317 with 20 extra base hits, 16 runs batted in, and 11 wstolen bases.

After an arm issue, his 2008 debut, with Savannah, happened in late June. After 46 games with Savannah, Lagares was demoted to the Low-A Brooklyn in the middle of August. In 65 total games, he hit .253/.284/.352 with 3 home runs and 24 runs batted in.

In 2009, Lagares began the season with Savannah, but a wrist injury suffered in late May ended most of his season. He came back in September after a rehab stint with the Gulf Coast League Mets. In 53 total games, he hit .266/.297/.323 with 14 runs batted in and 10 stolen bases. After the 2009 season, he played for Águilas Cibaeñas of the Dominican League.

In 2010, Lagares began the season with Savannah, and after hitting .300/.318/.459 with 5 home runs, 39 runs batted in, and 18 stolen bases in 67 games, he was promoted to High-A St. Lucie, but was limited to 33 games thereafter a fractured ankle ended his season on July 28.

In 2011, Lagares began in St. Lucie, before being promoted to Double-A Binghamton. In 120 games total, he hit .349/.383/.500 with 9 home runs, 71 runs batted in, and 15 stolen bases. Lagares was added to the Mets 40 man roster on November 18, 2011. After the 2011 major league season, he again played for the Cibaeñas in the Dominican League.

In 2012, Lagares was back in Binghamton, where in 130 games, he hit .283/.334/.389 with 4 home runs, 48 runs batted in, and 21 stolen bases. After the 2012 season, he played for the Cibaeñas of the LIDOM.

In 2013, Lagares began the season with Triple-A Las Vegas as their center fielder, where he played in 17 games before getting called up to the Mets with Kirk Nieuwenhuis being sent down to Las Vegas. Lagares made his debut on the same day against the Los Angeles Dodgers coming in as a part of a double switch in the fifth inning. In the bottom of the seventh inning, he recorded his first major league hit, a single off Paco Rodriguez. Lagares hit his first major league home run on May 19, against Travis Wood of the Chicago Cubs at Wrigley Field.

For the week of July 15–21, 2013, Lagares won the NL Player of the Week Award. In that week, Lagares hit .700 with a home run and 5 runs batted in. In 121 games for the Mets, he hit .242/.281/.352 with 4 home runs and 34 runs batted in. Lagares had a .983 fielding percentage, as well as leading the major leagues in assists at center field (14), defensive runs saved (26) and the National League in Range Factor/9 innings at center field with 2.98.

On August 20, Lagares ranked second among center fielders in defensive runs saved with 20, behind Carlos Gómez who had 27. In September, he was named the major league's best defender for the month of August. He led the majors with 12 defensive runs saved and led the National League, and ranked second in the majors, in outfield assists with 12. He set the Mets franchise rookie record with 15 outfield assists. His 3.5 defensive wins above replacement was second only to Milwaukee Brewers outfielder Carlos Gómez (4.6) among NL center fielders. He was named as the Mets best defensive player during Wilson's Defensive Player of the Year Awards. Lagares finished the 2013 season appearing in 121 games with a batting average of .242 in 392 at-bats in 421 plate appearances while compiling 95 hits, 34 runs batted in, 4 home runs, 20 walks, 35 runs scored and striking out 96 times.

After the 2013 season, he played for Cibaeñas of the Dominican League, winning the Rookie of the Year award. He hit .342 with one home run, 16 runs betted in, five stolen bases and seven walks in 114 at-bats.

In 2014, Lagares made the Mets' roster for Opening Day. On April 14, he left due to an injury during a game against the Arizona Diamondbacks. Lagares grabbed his hamstring after beating out a double play in the seventh inning. The next day, he was placed on the disabled list with a pulled right hamstring. He was batting .314 with a .345 on-base percentage, five extra base hits and seven runs batted in during the 13 games. He was recalled from rehabbing with the Las Vegas 51s on May 1.

In mid-May, Mets fans on social media sites such as Twitter and Facebook became frustrated with manager Terry Collins sitting Lagares on the bench since coming off the disabled list. As of May 16, he was benched for the fourth time in five games. Mets fans soon started a campaign called #FreeLagares to express their anger over him being benched. Although Lagares had been struggling since coming back from the disabled list, his defensive capability and clutch hitting were touted as being reasons enough for him to be put in the lineup. On June 2, he was placed again on the disabled list with a right intercostal strain. On June 26, Wilmer Flores was sent down to the 51s to make room for Lagares coming of the disabled list. On September 23, he was shut down for the rest of the season with a sprained elbow. By the end of the season he improved his hitting over the previous year, increasing his average by nearly 40 points, from .242 to .281.

Lagares finished the 2014 season appearing in 116 games with a batting average of .281 in 416 at-bats in 452 plate appearances while compiling 117 hits, 47 runs batted in, 4 home runs, 20 walks, 46 runs scored and striking out 87 times. On November 4, it was announced that he had won his first Gold Glove Award. He was the third outfielder in Met history to win a Gold Glove award, the others being Tommie Agee (1970) and Carlos Beltrán (2006–2008). He also won the Fielding Bible Award as the statistically best defensive center fielder in the National League.

On April 2, 2015, Lagares and the Mets agreed to a four-year extension worth $23 million which to run from 2016 through 2019. The Mets had a $9.5 million option for 2020, with a $500,000 buyout. Lagares made the team out of spring training as the starting center fielder. On July 31, the Mets traded for Yoenis Céspedes, who would play center regularly throughout the season. Lagares moved to backup outfield role, regularly coming in as defensive substitution late in the game. Lagares finished the 2015 season appearing in 143 games batting .259./.289/.358 in 441 at-bats in 465 plate appearances while compiling 114 hits, 41 runs batted in, 6 home runs, 16 walks, 47 runs scored and 87 strikeouts. In the 2015 National League Division Series against the Los Angeles Dodgers, he hit .429 in 4 games while compiling 3 hits, 2 doubles, 1 walk and scoring 3 runs. In the 2015 National League Championship Series against the Chicago Cubs, he hit .333 in 4 games with 2 hits, 2 runs scored, 1 stolen base and 2 strikeouts. In the World Series against the Kansas City Royals, he played in all 4 games, hitting .300 with 3 hits, 2 runs scored, 1 stolen base and striking out once. After the 2015 season, he played for Cibaeñas of the Dominican League.

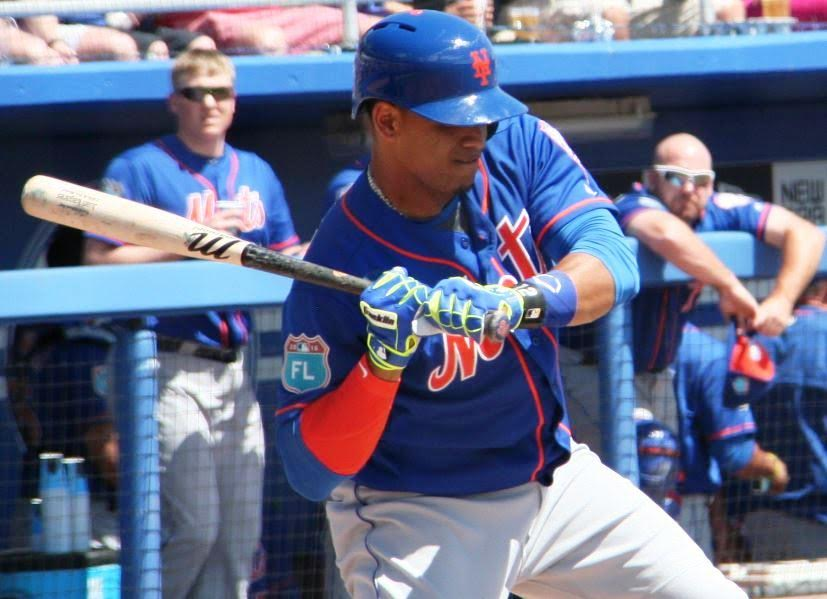
Lagares batting during spring training in 2016

In 2016, Lagares made the Mets' Opening Day roster, serving as a backup outfielder, pinch hitter and defensive substitution. On June 16 the Mets placed Lagares on the disabled list due to a sprained left thumb he had suffered while making a diving catch in a game on June 4. He again went on the 15-day disabled list from July 29 to September 16 for his sprained left thumb, and then had surgery on August 1 to repair a torn ligament in the thumb. For the season, he batted .239/.301/.380.

In 2017, Lagares battled injuries but contributed to the Mets with 58 starts and 252 at bats. He hit .250/.296/.365 for the year and participated in a deep and injury-riddled outfield in 2017.

On May 17, 2018, Lagares tore the plantar plate in his toe while attempting to catch a fly ball, requiring surgery. He missed the remainder of the 2018 season due to this. After the 2018 season, he again played for Cibaeñas of the Dominican League.

Lagares became a free agent on November 1, 2019, when the Mets declined his contract option for the 2020 season. After the 2019 season, he played for Cibaeñas of the Dominican League.

On February 10, 2020, Lagares signed a minor league contract with the San Diego Padres organization. He elected free agency on July 14. On July 22, Lagares signed a minor league contract with the New York Mets. On August 25, he was selected to the active roster. Lagares was designated for assignment on August 28 and was outrighted on August 30, but elected free agency. After the 2020 season, he played for Cibaeñas of the Dominican League. He also played for Dominican Republic in the 2021 Caribbean Series.

=== Los Angeles Angels ===
On February 7, 2021, Lagares signed a minor league contract with the Los Angeles Angels that included an invitation to spring training. On March 31, Lagares was selected to the 40-man roster. Lagares finished 2021 hitting .236/.266/.372 in 112 games. On May 8, 2022, Lagares returned to the Angels on a minor league contract, being assigned to Triple-A Salt Lake.

On May 26, Lagares' contract was selected for the major league roster by the Angels. He made his season debut that day against the Toronto Blue Jays. In 20 games, Lagares batted .183/.210/.480 before being designated for assignment on June 24. On June 29, Lagares declined his outright minor league assignment and elected free agency.

=== SSG Landers ===
On July 8, 2022, Lagares signed with the SSG Landers of the KBO League on a one-year, $495,000 contract. In 49 appearances for the team, he slashed .315/.362/.464 with six home runs, 32 RBI, and three stolen bases. Lagares became a free agent after the season.

On February 19, 2026, Lagares announced his retirement from professional baseball.

== Personal life ==
Lagares had a son, Juan Jr., in September 2013 and is not married.

On June 1, 2023, Lagares was included in a lawsuit by a man who was blinded in his left eye by a 'randomly hurled ball' from Lagares.
