= 2016 St. Louis Cardinals season =

Major League Baseball season

2016 St. Louis Cardinals
- League: National League
- Division: Central
- Ballpark: Busch Stadium
- City: St. Louis, Missouri
- Record: 86–76 (.531)
- Divisional place: 2nd
- Owners: William DeWitt, Jr. Fred Hanser
- General managers: John Mozeliak
- Managers: Mike Matheny
- Television: Fox Sports Midwest (Dan McLaughlin, Al Hrabosky, Rick Horton, Tim McCarver, Jim Edmonds)
- Radio: KMOX (1120AM); St. Louis Cardinals Radio Network (Mike Shannon, John Rooney, Rick Horton, Mike Claiborne)
- Stats: ESPN.com; Baseball Reference

The St. Louis Cardinals 2016 season was the 135th for the Major League Baseball (MLB) franchise in St. Louis, Missouri, the 125th season in the National League (NL), and the 11th at Busch Stadium III. They entered the season having won a major-league best 100 games, as three-time defending National League Central champions, and with five consecutive playoff appearances. Forbes magazine estimated the value of the club to be $1.6 billion in 2016, making it the seventh-most valuable franchise in MLB. The Cardinals were eliminated from playoff (Wild Card) contention following the San Francisco Giants' 7–1 victory over the Los Angeles Dodgers on Sunday, October 2. This was the first time the Cardinals failed to make the playoffs since 2010.

== Off-season ==
=== Overview ===
The Cardinals entered the 2016 season having won a major league-best 100 games, their third consecutive National League Central division title, and fifth consecutive playoff appearance. Their 2015 season ended in the National League Division Series (NLDS) when the rival Chicago Cubs defeated them in four games. Former Cardinals David Eckstein, Jim Edmonds and Troy Glaus were announced as first-time candidates on the 2016 ballot for the National Baseball Hall of Fame and Museum on November 9. In mid-December, former Cardinals player and manager Joe Torre led an expedition to Cuba composed of MLB officials and players, including then-current Cardinals catcher Brayan Peña and former Cardinals outfielder Jon Jay. It was MLB's first visit there since 1999, and one anticipated as an important step to help normalize relations with the United States that had begun to ease earlier in the year. Former Cardinals manager Vern Rapp died on December 31, 2015.

Chris Correa, the previous director of scouting for the Cardinals, plead guilty on January 8, 2016, to five of 12 counts in a United States district court in Houston related to alleged corporate espionage of the Houston Astros. Reports of the investigation first became public in July 2015. For the 2016 franchise Hall of Fame ballot, the Cardinals announced on January 17 it would include Chris Carpenter, Keith Hernandez, Jason Isringhausen, Mark McGwire, Matt Morris, Édgar Rentería, Scott Rolen, and Joe Torre.

According to Forbes magazine, at $1.6 billion, the Cardinals were the seventh-most valuable franchise in MLB. Their revenue in 2015 was $300 million, while their operating income was $60 million. It was an increase from the year before at $1.4 billion, when they were ranked sixth in MLB.

==== Personnel moves ====
On October 26, 2015, the club announced intent to retain all of manager Mike Matheny's coaching staff. Greg Hauch resigned as the head athletic trainer in November, whom Adam Olsen replaced the following month.

==== Injuries ====
Injuries to the starting rotation emerged: Carlos Martínez strained his shoulder late in the previous season and the Cardinals appraised him likely to recover in time for the beginning of the season. Lance Lynn had Tommy John surgery, and on November 10, the Cardinals announced he would miss the 2016 season. On December 17, catcher Yadier Molina underwent surgery on his left thumb, and second since the previous September, to correct a ligament that had not properly healed. He was estimated to miss at least part of spring training.

=== Acquisitions, departures, and roster moves ===
==== Players ====
Contract options

October 31, 2015	Jaime García (LHP) $11.5 million team option for 2016	St. Louis Cardinals Exercised
November 2, 2015	Jonathan Broxton (RHP) $9 million team option for 2016	St. Louis Cardinals Declined and bought out for $2 million

Trades

December 2, 2015	To St. Louis Cardinals José Martínez (SS)	To Kansas City Royals Tony Cruz (C)
December 7, 2015	To St. Louis Cardinals Jedd Gyorko (2B) $7.5 million	To San Diego Padres Jon Jay (CF)

Major league free agents

Matt Belisle (RHP)	Departed St. Louis Cardinals November 2, 2015 Contracts expired after World Series	Signed with Washington Nationals February 17, 2016 Minor league contract with spring training invite
Randy Choate (LHP)	Departed St. Louis Cardinals November 2, 2015 Contracts expired after World Series	Signed with Toronto Blue Jays March 11, 2016 Minor league contract with spring training invite
Jason Heyward (RF)^{[a]}	Departed St. Louis Cardinals November 2, 2015 Contracts expired after World Series	Signed with Chicago Cubs December 15, 2015 8 years, $184 million
John Lackey (RHP)^{[a]}	Departed St. Louis Cardinals November 2, 2015 Contracts expired after World Series	Signed with Chicago Cubs December 8, 2015 2 years, $32 million
Mark Reynolds (1B)	Departed St. Louis Cardinals November 2, 2015 Contracts expired after World Series	Signed with Colorado Rockies December 16, 2015 1 year, $2.6 million
Carlos Villanueva (RHP)	Departed St. Louis Cardinals November 2, 2015 Contracts expired after World Series	Signed with San Diego Padres January 13, 2016 1 year, $1.5 million
Jonathan Broxton (RHP)	Departed St. Louis Cardinals November 2, 2015 Cardinals declined team option	Resigned with St. Louis Cardinals December 10, 2015 2 years, $7.5 million
Brayan Peña (C)	Departed Cincinnati Reds November 2, 2015 Contract expired after World Series	Signed with St. Louis Cardinals November 30, 2015 2 years, $5 million
Steve Cishek (RHP)	Departed St. Louis Cardinals December 2, 2015 Non-tendered contracts as arbitration-eligible players	Signed with Seattle Mariners December 14, 2015 2 years, $10 million
Cody Stanley (C)	Departed St. Louis Cardinals December 2, 2015 Non-tendered contracts as arbitration-eligible players
Mike Leake (RHP)	Departed San Francisco Giants November 2, 2015 Contract expired after World Series	Signed with St. Louis Cardinals December 22, 2015 5 years, $80 million
Seung-hwan Oh (RHP)	Departed Hanshin Tigers (NPB) After 2015 season	Signed with St. Louis Cardinals January 11, 2016 1 year, $5 million
Rubén Tejada (SS)	Released by New York Mets March 16, 2016	Signed with St. Louis Cardinals March 19, 2016 1 year, $1.5 million

Minor league free agents

Pete Kozma (SS)	Departed St. Louis Cardinals November 5, 2015	Signed with New York Yankees December 4, 2015 Minor league contract
Jeremy Hefner (RHP)	Departed New York Mets November 4, 2014	Signed with St. Louis Cardinals December 28, 2015 Minor league contract with spring training invite
Carlos Peguero (OF)	Departed Boston Red Sox organization November 6, 2015	Signed with St. Louis Cardinals January 22, 2016 Minor league contract with spring training invite

Arbitration-eligible players

Matt Adams (1B)	St. Louis Cardinals December 2, 2015 Tendered contracts	Signed before arbitration January 15, 2016 1 year, $1.65 million
Seth Maness (RHP)	St. Louis Cardinals December 2, 2015 Tendered contracts	Signed before arbitration January 15, 2016 1 year, $1.4 million
Brandon Moss (1B)	St. Louis Cardinals December 2, 2015 Tendered contracts	Signed before arbitration January 15, 2016 1 year, $8.25 million
Trevor Rosenthal (RHP)	St. Louis Cardinals December 2, 2015 Tendered contracts	Signed before arbitration 1 year, $5.6 million January 15, 2016
Steve Cishek (RHP)	St. Louis Cardinals December 2, 2015 Did not tender contracts	Rendered free agents
Cody Stanley (C)	St. Louis Cardinals December 2, 2015 Did not tender contracts	Rendered free agents

40-man roster moves

November 2, 2015	Pete Kozma (SS)	Removed from 40-man roster Reassigned to AAA Memphis Redbirds
November 5, 2015	Anthony Garcia (OF) Purchased from AAA Memphis Redbirds	Added to 40-man roster
November 19, 2015	Aledmys Díaz (SS)	Added to 40-man roster
November 19, 2015	Dean Kiekhefer (LHP)	Added to 40-man roster
November 19, 2015	Charlie Tilson (OF)	Added to 40-man roster
November 30, 2015	Brayan Peña (C) Signed as free-agent	Added to 40-man roster
December 2, 2015	Peter Bourjos (CF) Waived by St. Louis Cardinals	Claimed by Philadelphia Philles December 3, 2015 Signed 1 year, $2 million contract
March 13, 2016	Jayson Aquino (LHP)	Optioned to AAA Memphis Redbirds
March 14, 2016	Charlie Tilson (OF)	Optioned to AAA Memphis Redbirds
March 19, 2016	Rubén Tejada (SS) Signed as free-agent	Added to 40-man roster
March 20, 2016	Aledmys Diaz (SS), Dean Anna (SS), [[Anthony Garcia (baseball)O'Brien, David (October 4, 2015). "Miller ends skid, Braves sweep Cardinals in season-finale doubleheader". Atlanta Journal-Constitution.|Anthony Garcia]] (OF)	Optioned to AAA Memphis Redbirds
March 21, 2016	Marco Gonzales (LHP)	Optioned to AAA Memphis Redbirds
April 3, 2016	Matthew Bowman (RHP), Eric Fryer (C), Jerermy Hazelbaker (OF)	Added to 25-man roster

== Spring training ==
The Cardinals announced on January 21, 2016, they had extended an invitation to spring training to 22 non-roster players in addition to those already on the 40-man roster, bringing the total at that point to start spring training with club 61. Further, 26 of their prospects were also invited to their Spring training Early Program (STEP). The 22 non-roster invitees included pitchers RHP Silfredo Garcia, LHP Austin Gomber, RHP Juan González, RHP Jeremy Hefner, LHP Corey Littrell, RHP Deck McGuire, RHP Trey Nielsen, RHP Daniel Poncedeleon, RHP Robby Rowland, RHP J. C. Sulbaran, RHP Tyler Waldron, and RHP Luke Weaver. Non-pitchers included catchers Steve Bean, Luis Cruz, Eric Fryer, Carson Kelly, and Alberto Rosario. Also included were infielders Jonathan Rodriguez, David Washington, Jacob Wilson and Patrick Wisdom and outfielder Jeremy Hazelbaker. The next day, the club invited outfielder Carlos Peguero.

The 26 players invited to STEP were Sandy Alcantara, John Brebbia, Junior Fernandez, Jack Flaherty, Derian Gonzalez, Josh Lucas, Mike Mayers, Alex Reyes, Arturo Reyes, Rowan Wick and Jacob Woodford; catchers Christopher Chinea, Jose Godoy, Ryan McCarvel and Brian O’Keefe; infielders Eliezer Alvarez, Paul DeJong, Juan Herrera, Chris Jacobs, Oscar Mercado, Darren Seferina and Edmundo Sosa; and outfielders Harrison Bader, C. J. McElroy, Nick Plummer and Magneuris Sierra.

Shortstop Jhonny Peralta injured his thumb on March 7, damaging the ulnar collateral ligament. He underwent surgery three days later and was expected to miss 10 to 12 weeks of play.

Longtime 3B coach Jose Oquendo for the past 16 years, is placed on medical leave of absence March 27, due to rehabbing his right knee in Florida. He has been on crutches after his second procedure on the knee. 1B coach Chris Maloney now moves to 3B, Assistant hitting coach Bill Mueller moves to 1B coach. Derrick May who was in the organization's minor leagues, is now the assistant hitting coach.

The team suffered another unexpected injury in their final spring training game on March 31, when their newly acquired shortstop Ruben Tejada signed on March 19, strained his left quad running to first base in a 9–1 win over the New York Yankees. Jedd Gyorko will substitute for him and make the first game start in Pittsburgh on April 3. The injury to Tejada forces the Cardinals to open the season with five players: Tejada, Jhonny Peralta, Mitch Harris, Lance Lynn and Jordan Walden, on the 15-day disabled list.

Another serious injury, this one to backup catcher Brayan Pena's left knee after slipping in a dugout a few days ago, puts him on the 15-day disabled list after surgery from two to four weeks, along with the five others. Non-Roster Invite Eric Fryer takes his place on the 25-man roster.

Contract extension

March 2, 2016	Kolten Wong (2B) Pre-arbitration	Signed extension with St. Louis Cardinals 5 years, $25.5 million with $12.5 million team option for 2021

== Season standings ==
=== National League Central ===
NL Central
Team	W	L	Pct.	GB	Home	Road
Chicago Cubs	103	58	.640	—	57‍–‍24	46‍–‍34
St. Louis Cardinals	86	76	.531	17½	38‍–‍43	48‍–‍33
Pittsburgh Pirates	78	83	.484	25	38‍–‍42	40‍–‍41
Milwaukee Brewers	73	89	.451	30½	41‍–‍40	32‍–‍49
Cincinnati Reds	68	94	.420	35½	38‍–‍43	30‍–‍51

=== National League playoff standings ===
Playoff standings

Division leaders
Team	W	L	Pct.
Chicago Cubs	103	58	.640
Washington Nationals	95	67	.586
Los Angeles Dodgers	91	71	.562

Wild Card teams (Top 2 teams qualify for postseason)
Team	W	L	Pct.	GB
New York Mets	87	75	.537	—
San Francisco Giants	87	75	.537	—
St. Louis Cardinals	86	76	.531	1
Miami Marlins	79	82	.491	7½
Pittsburgh Pirates	78	83	.484	8½
Colorado Rockies	75	87	.463	12
Milwaukee Brewers	73	89	.451	14
Philadelphia Phillies	71	91	.438	16
Arizona Diamondbacks	69	93	.426	18
Atlanta Braves	68	93	.422	18½
San Diego Padres	68	94	.420	19
Cincinnati Reds	68	94	.420	19

=== National League head-to-head records ===
Head-to-head records

2016 National League record Source: MLB Standings Grid – 2016
Team	AZ	ATL	CHC	CIN	COL	LAD	MIA	MIL	NYM	PHI	PIT	SD	SF	STL	WSH	AL
Arizona	—	5–2	2–5	3–3	10–9	7–12	2–4	3–4	5–1	4–3	1–5	10–9	6–13	4–3	2–5	5–15
Atlanta	2–5	—	3–3	3–4	1–6	1–5	11–7	2–5	10–9	11–8	3–4	4–2	3–4	2–4	4–15	8–12
Chicago	5–2	3–3	—	15–4	2–4	4–3	4–3	11–8	2–5	5–1	14–4	4–2	4–3	10–9	5–2	15–5
Cincinnati	3–3	4–3	4–15	—	5–2	2–5	3–4	11–8	0–6	4–2	9–10	3–4	3–3	9–10	3–4	5–15
Colorado	9–10	6–1	4–2	2–5	—	7–12	2–5	1–5	6–1	2–5	2–5	10–9	9–10	2–4	4–2	9–11
Los Angeles	12–7	5–1	3–4	5–2	12–7	—	1–6	5–2	4–3	4–2	2–5	11–8	8–11	4–2	5–1	10–10
Miami	4–2	7–11	3–4	4–3	5–2	6–1	—	4–2	7–12	9–10	6–1	3–3	2–4	4–3	9–10	6–14
Milwaukee	4–3	5–2	8–11	8–11	5–1	2–5	2–4	—	2–5	3–4	9–10	3–4	1–5	6–13	4–2	11–9
New York	1–5	9–10	5–2	6–0	1–6	3–4	12–7	5–2	—	12–7	3–3	4–3	4–3	3–3	7–12	12–8
Philadelphia	3–4	8–11	1–5	2–4	5–2	2–4	10–9	4–3	7–12	—	3–4	5–2	3–3	2–5	5–14	11–9
Pittsburgh	5–1	4–3	4–14	10–9	5–2	5–2	1–6	10–9	3–3	4–3	—	3–3	4–3	9–10	2–4	9–11
San Diego	9–10	2–4	2–4	4–3	9–10	8–11	3–3	4–3	3–4	2–5	3–3	—	8–11	1–6	4–3	6–14
San Francisco	13–6	4–3	3–4	3–3	10–9	11–8	4–2	5–1	3–4	3–3	3–4	11–8	—	3–4	3–4	8–12
St. Louis	3–4	4–2	9–10	10–9	4–2	2–4	3–4	13–6	3–3	5–2	10–9	6–1	4–3	—	2–5	8–12
Washington	5–2	15–4	2–5	4–3	2–4	1–5	10–9	2–4	12–7	14–5	4–2	3–4	4–3	5–2	—	12–8

=== Record vs. Opponents ===
2016 National League record Source: MLB Standings Grid – 2016
Team	AZ	ATL	CHC	CIN	COL	LAD	MIA	MIL	NYM	PHI	PIT	SD	SF	STL	WSH	AL
Arizona	—	5–2	2–5	3–3	10–9	7–12	2–4	3–4	5–1	4–3	1–5	10–9	6–13	4–3	2–5	5–15
Atlanta	2–5	—	3–3	3–4	1–6	1–5	11–7	2–5	10–9	11–8	3–4	4–2	3–4	2–4	4–15	8–12
Chicago	5–2	3–3	—	15–4	2–4	4–3	4–3	11–8	2–5	5–1	14–4	4–2	4–3	10–9	5–2	15–5
Cincinnati	3–3	4–3	4–15	—	5–2	2–5	3–4	11–8	0–6	4–2	9–10	3–4	3–3	9–10	3–4	5–15
Colorado	9–10	6–1	4–2	2–5	—	7–12	2–5	1–5	6–1	2–5	2–5	10–9	9–10	2–4	4–2	9–11
Los Angeles	12–7	5–1	3–4	5–2	12–7	—	1–6	5–2	4–3	4–2	2–5	11–8	8–11	4–2	5–1	10–10
Miami	4–2	7–11	3–4	4–3	5–2	6–1	—	4–2	7–12	9–10	6–1	3–3	2–4	4–3	9–10	6–14
Milwaukee	4–3	5–2	8–11	8–11	5–1	2–5	2–4	—	2–5	3–4	9–10	3–4	1–5	6–13	4–2	11–9
New York	1–5	9–10	5–2	6–0	1–6	3–4	12–7	5–2	—	12–7	3–3	4–3	4–3	3–3	7–12	12–8
Philadelphia	3–4	8–11	1–5	2–4	5–2	2–4	10–9	4–3	7–12	—	3–4	5–2	3–3	2–5	5–14	11–9
Pittsburgh	5–1	4–3	4–14	10–9	5–2	5–2	1–6	10–9	3–3	4–3	—	3–3	4–3	9–10	2–4	9–11
San Diego	9–10	2–4	2–4	4–3	9–10	8–11	3–3	4–3	3–4	2–5	3–3	—	8–11	1–6	4–3	6–14
San Francisco	13–6	4–3	3–4	3–3	10–9	11–8	4–2	5–1	3–4	3–3	3–4	11–8	—	3–4	3–4	8–12
St. Louis	3–4	4–2	9–10	10–9	4–2	2–4	3–4	13–6	3–3	5–2	10–9	6–1	4–3	—	2–5	8–12
Washington	5–2	15–4	2–5	4–3	2–4	1–5	10–9	2–4	12–7	14–5	4–2	3–4	4–3	5–2	—	12–8

== Regular season summary ==
=== April ===
==== Opening Series vs. Pittsburgh Pirates ====
The Cardinals played Opening Day in the first game of the Major League Baseball (MLB) season on April 3, commencing at PNC Park against the division rival Pittsburgh Pirates. Adam Wainwright made his fifth career Opening Day start for the Cardinals. The game had a starting temperature of 39 degrees (F). Outfielder Tommy Pham suffered a tear in his left oblique in the first inning and placed on the 15-day disabled list (DL). The Cardinals lost the game, 4–1, with Wainwright taking the first loss of the season. Free agent starting pitcher acquisition Mike Leake made his Cardinals debut on April 6 against the Pirates, allowing four runs and seven hits in 4 1/3 IP, resulting in being charged with the loss as Pittsburgh won, 5–1, and swept the opening series.

Opening Day starting lineup
at PNC Park, April 3, 2016
defeated by PIT, 1–4
No.	Name	Pos.
13	Matt Carpenter	3B
28	Tommy Pham	LF
7	Matt Holliday	1B
15	Randal Grichuk	CF
55	Stephen Piscotty	RF
4	Yadier Molina	C
16	Kolten Wong	2B
3	Jedd Gyorko	SS
50	Adam Wainwright	P

==== Molina breaks Cardinals' games caught record ====
Yadier Molina, 33, broke the all-time Cardinals' games catching record on April 8, in his 1,440th game, passing Ted Simmons (1968–1980). His 1,343 games started since the beginning of the 2005 season topped the majors.

==== Hazelbaker, Díaz, and Garcia establish MLB pinch-hitting home run record ====
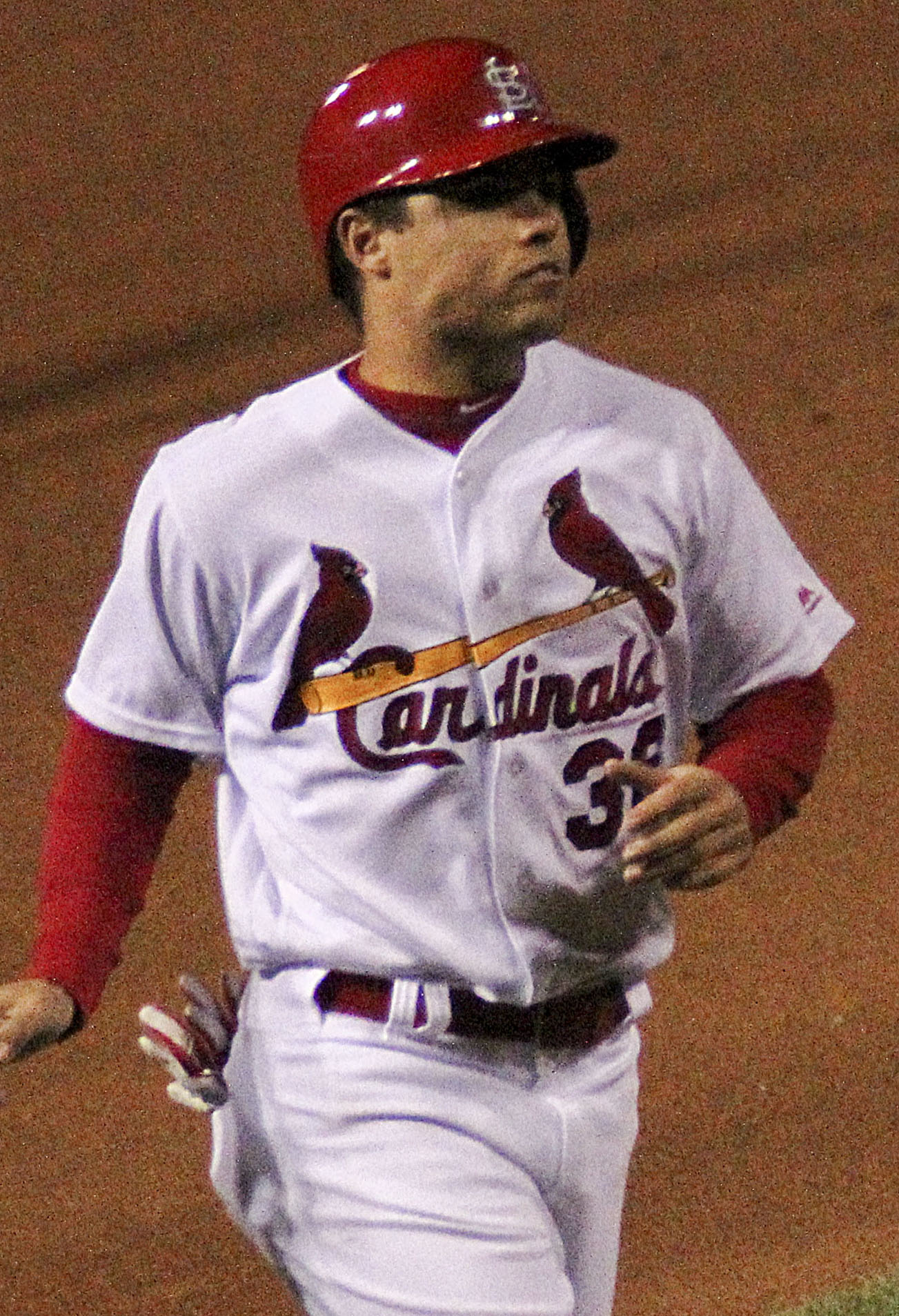
Aledmys Díaz became the first rookie in MLB history to bat at least .500 at any point after collecting 50 at bats.

On April 8, Jeremy Hazelbaker, Aledmys Díaz, and Greg Garcia established a new MLB record by each hitting a pinch hit home run, becoming the first to hit three pinch hit home runs in one game for the same team. The previous record of two pinch hit home runs by the same team in the same game had previously occurred on 57 occasions, most recently in 2011. It was Díaz' first major league home run. The Cardinals won this contest, 7–4, over the Atlanta Braves. Hazelbaker's home run gave him two in his first four career games, joining Joe Cunningham (1954) as the only Cardinals to accomplish the feat. The Cardinals swept the Braves on April 10 in a 12–6 win. Brandon Moss hit his first career home run against Atlanta off Williams Pérez, thus giving him a home run against all 30 teams. Seung-hwan Oh was credited with his first major league win. Hazelbaker's first career four-hit game, including his first career triple, came in a 10–1 victory over the Milwaukee Brewers in the Cardinals' April 11 home opener at Busch Stadium.

==== García throws one-hitter ====
In his second appearance of the season, starter Jaime García turned in a career start against the Milwaukee Brewers on April 14. He pitched a complete game, one-hit shutout while striking out a career-high 13 batters and inducing 13 ground outs as St. Louis won, 7–0. He became the first left-handed pitcher in franchise history to achieve a one-hit shutout while striking out at least 13. The 13 strikeouts were the most by a lefty since Steve Carlton struck out 16 in 1970, with García posting a game score of 97, a season-high for MLB through April 14. The Cardinals did not have a nine-inning complete game by a starter all of last season. It was the first one-hitter by a Cardinals' pitcher since Wainwright held the Arizona Diamondbacks to one hit on May 20, 2014. In this game, Brandon Moss and Matt Adams both contributed pinch hit home runs.

==== Cardinals break record at Busch III with six home runs ====
The club was smoking hot at the plate on April 15, with a new Busch III record of six home runs in a 14–3 thrashing of Cincinnati. Matt Holliday hit his first two home runs of the season, Aledmys Díaz and Randal Grichuk both also hit their second on the year, and Brandon Moss and Matt Adams homered off the bench. Moss' and Adams' home runs were the fifth and sixth off the bench in 2016. The club had only four in the entire 2015 season. The six home runs gave the team 17 in its first 10 games. They had only 137 in 2015 which ranked 25th out of the 30 teams. Cardinals pinch hitters are hitting .563 (9-for-16) with six homers and nine RBIs. The team record of 10 pinch hit home runs was set in 1998. Joey Votto hit his first home run of the season, tying the single-game mark for two teams at Busch III with seven, done by these same teams one day before the 10th anniversary in doing it on April 16, 2006.

==== Fryer's continued perfect start and game-winning RBI ====
Catcher Eric Fryer made his first start for the Cardinals on April 17 at Busch Stadium against the Reds. He reached base in all four plate appearances, including three hits in three at bats and first walk of the season, to extend a streak of seven consecutive plate appearances reaching base to open the season. His collected his first two doubles for the Cardinals, including driving in Aledmys Díaz for the decisive run in a 4–3 win, allowing St. Louis to take two of three in the series from Cincinnati.

==== Greg Garcia optioned ====
The Cardinals optioned Greg Garcia to their AAA-Memphis club on April 18, when they reactivated Rubén Tejada. Garcia had six hits in ten at bats for a .600 batting average, six runs scored, one double, one home run, two RBIs, four walks, a HBP, a .733 OBP, and a 1.000 SLG in 15 plate appearances.

==== Trevor Rosenthal records 100th career save ====
Trevor Rosenthal recorded his 100th career save by striking out the side against the Chicago Cubs on April 20, becoming the fifth Cardinals pitcher to accumulate 100 saves. In an 11–2 win over the San Diego Padres on April 23, Díaz garnered his first five-hit game and Hazelbaker hit another pinch hit home run.

==== Almedys Diaz is first rookie to have .500 batting average after 50 ABs ====
After collecting two hits in his first two at bats in a game against the Arizona Diamondbacks on April 25 to give him 26 hits in 52 at bats, Díaz became the first rookie in MLB history to carry at least a .500 batting average at any point after accumulating 50 at bats, per the Elias Sports Bureau. On April 29, the club announced that former owner Sam Breadon, starting pitcher Chris Carpenter, center fielder Terry Moore, and catcher and manager Joe Torre were selected as the 2016 class to be inducted into the franchise Hall of Fame, with the enshrinement scheduled for August 27, 2016.

==== Cardinals below .500 at home ====
The team ended April with a three-game losing streak at home to the Nationals, falling to 5–6 at home, 7–6 on the road, for a .500 record (12–12) for the month.

=== May ===
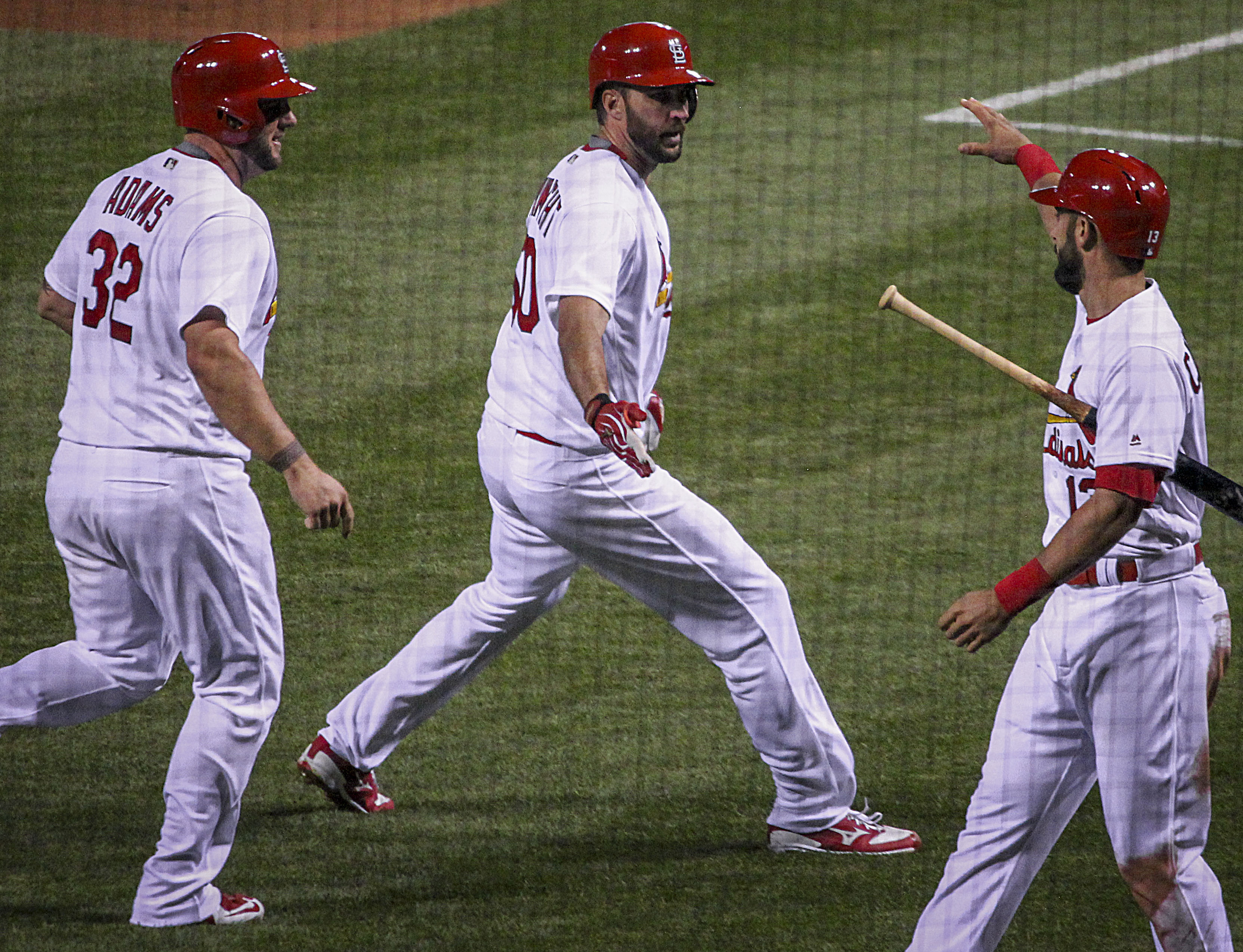
Adam Wainwright (middle) flanked by teammates Matt Adams (left) and Matt Carpenter (right) after hitting a three-run home run on May 2, 2016

The Cardinals, through the first month of 2016 having improved their run-scoring and home run rates from the previous season, likewise received increased hitting contribution from Wainwright. He hit his first home run of season in a 10–3 win over the Philadelphia Phillies on May 2, also being credited with his second win of the season. In each of four consecutive plate appearances spanning April 27 to May 7, he became the first Cardinal pitcher since 1900 to garner an extra base hit while batting, per the Elias Sports Bureau. Carpenter's first career walk-off home run came on May 7 in a 6–4 win over Pittsburgh.

Mike Leake, the club's top free agent acquisition in terms of amount of money awarded from the previous off-season, earned his first win a Cardinals uniform on May 10 against the Los Angeles Angels of Anaheim in an 8–1 advantage.

==== Maness on DL ====
Reliever Seth Maness landed on the DL for the first time in his career on May 14 (retroactive to May 13), after an exam revealed an inflammation on his right (pitching) elbow. He was having pitching difficulties, getting hit hard in his previous 1/3 inning against the Anaheim Angels on May 12. For the season, he has a 6.39 ERA and 1.97 WHIP in 12 2/3 innings. The velocity on all four of his pitches has been down an average of 2–3 mph this season. He will eventually be able to join a Minor League affiliate on a rehab assignment, instead of as a member of that club's roster. That rehab assignment can last up to 30 days.

To take Maness' place on the MLB roster, the club called up left-handed reliever Dean Kiekhefer from Memphis. He made his major league debut on May 14 in Los Angeles in the sixth inning against the Dodgers, striking out four and allowing no walks in 1 2/3 innings. The only hit and run charged to him—both firsts of his career—was a home run to Corey Seager.

==== Molina makes 1,500th career appearance ====
Molina made the 1,500th career appearance overall of his major league career in the May 14 game against Los Angeles.

==== Carpenter ties Cardinals' leadoff record with 6 RBI ====
On May 19, Matt Carpenter established a new career-high six RBI in a game at Busch Stadium against the Colorado Rockies, with two doubles and his ninth HR of the season in a 13–7 win. Carpenter is the first Cardinal since Red Schoendienst in 1953 to record two doubles, a home run and six RBI in a single game, and the first Cardinals leadoff hitter since Shawon Dunston in 2000 to have six RBI in a single game. His batting average went up 13 points to .259, far below his .313 he was hitting after 41 games in 2015. Reliever Jonathan Broxton started the season with a 2.25 ERA through May 19, but after allowing five earned runs while recording one out against the Arizona Diamondbacks on May 20 at Busch Stadium, his ERA jumped to 4.96, and the Diamondbacks held a 9–2 advantage. As a result, backup infielder Rubén Tejada made his first major league appearance as a pitcher in the ninth inning, pitching one complete inning while allowing two earned runs on back-to-back home runs to Chris Herrmann and Brandon Drury.

==== Alex Reyes returns from 50-game suspension ====
The Cardinals No. 1 pitching prospect and No. 11 in all of MLB, Alex Reyes, returned from his 50-game suspension, pitching four scoreless innings on May 22, for AAA Memphis. He gave up two singles, walked three, and struck out eight. He tested positive for marijuana, and Major League Baseball suspended Reyes on November 9, 2015, for 50 games including the remainder of his Arizona Fall League play, and start of the 2016 season.

==== Randal Grichuk gets his first walk-off HR ====
Center fielder Randal Grichuk hit his first career walk-off home run on May 23 in a 4–3 win against the Cubs.

==== Mitch Harris to 60-day DL; Cards buy José Martínez from KC Royals ====
Reliever Mitch Harris is transferred to the 60-day DL, and the team bought LF José Martínez from the Kansas City Royals for cash.

==== Matt Carpenter on Paternity Leave, Greg Garcia recalled ====
Third Baseman Matt Carpenter was granted paternity leave to attend the birth of his first child on May 25, causing him to miss the rubber game against the Chicago Cubs. The team can replace him on the roster for up to three days before going with only 24 active players. The Cardinals recalled Greg Garcia from AAA Memphis to take Carpenter's place on the active roster. After missing three games (May 25–27), Carpenter returned and Greg Garcia was also kept on the roster, hitting a torrid .615 for the season. Rubén Tejada was designated for assignment for the move to make room for Carpenter and to keep Garcia. Tejada had signed a one-year $1.5 mil. contract, but only hit .176 (6-for-34) with two doubles. Tejada can now choose to accept the Cardinals' assignment to Triple-A, or sign with another team.

==== Stephen Piscotty's first career Grand Slam, Mike Matheny's 400th win and Holliday's 1,000th hit with Cardinals ====
While playing the Nationals in the seventh inning of a 2–1 loss at Busch Stadium on May 26, Stephen Drew hit a high infield fly that stayed over the pitcher's mound. With both Aledmys Díaz and Mike Leake attempting to catch the ball, Molina posited himself and waited. As the ball deflected off Díaz' glove, he almost collided with Leake, but Molina instinctively moved his glove and caught the ball before it hit the ground. The Cardinals defeated the Nationals the next day, 6–2, as Stephen Piscotty hit his first career grand slam against Max Scherzer, Garcia homered and drew two walks batting leadoff and Mike Matheny achieved his 400th career managerial win. He managed his 700th game on May 30, a 6–0 win against the Milwaukee Brewers. Matt Holliday collected his 1,000th career hit with the Cardinals on May 31 against the Brewers.

=== June ===
==== Brandon Moss ties franchise pinch-hit home run record ====
In a 3–1 loss to the Brewers on June 1, Brandon Moss' 10th home run, a pinch-hit, accounted for the only Cardinals' run of the game. In the 54th game of 2016, this tied the franchise club record for pinch-hit home runs in a season with 10, set in 1998. The Major League record is 14, set in 2001, by both the Arizona Diamondbacks and San Francisco Giants. In 2001, the Diamondbacks were World Series champions, while the Cardinals and Giants in those respective years, hosted Mark McGwire and Barry Bonds both breaking the individual single-season home run record. The 2016 Cardinals, with 72 home runs at the one-third mark as a team, were 32 ahead of the year before. Through this point, Moss and Hazelbaker both led the 2016 team with three pinch-hit home runs.

==== Díaz and Oh among early frontrunners for NL Rookie of the Year Award ====
Both Aledmys Díaz and Seung-Hwan Oh garnered early attention for the National League (NL) Rookie of the Year Award. As of June 6, Díaz was third in the NL in batting at .328 and had hit eight home runs and 30 RBIs. Oh, in his first 31 games and 32 2/3 innings pitched, had struck out 46 batters – tied for first among NL relievers – while walking eight and permitting an ERA of 1.65.

==== Kolten Wong optioned to AAA ====
On June 6, 2B Kolten Wong was optioned to AAA-Memphis, in anticipation of Jhonny Peralta's activation from the disabled list.

==== Matt Carpenter wins NL Player of the Week Award ====
On June 6, Matt Carpenter won the NL Major League Baseball Player of the Week Award for the May 30 – June 5-week. He batted .560 (14-for-25), with five doubles, two triples, three RBI, and 10 runs scored. He led all of MLB with a .577 OBP and his 10 runs. He slugged .920 for a 1.497 OPS. This was his second career weekly award, having won previously for the week of April 13–19, 2015. He won it less than two weeks after the birth of his first child, daughter Kinley on May 25.

==== Wong recalled, Jeremy Hazelbaker optioned ====
On June 17, Kolten Wong was recalled, while OF'er Jeremy Hazelbaker was optioned to AAA-Memphis. Wong played some of his seven games in centerfield, while hitting .429 (12-for-28), with 4 HR and 11 RBI. He hit safely in all seven games. Hazelbaker hit .250 in his 61 G with 7 HR, 3 of them as a pinch-hitter. He led the team with 4 SB.

==== Randal Grichuk optioned, Tommy Pham recalled ====
The day after Wong was recalled, OF'er Tommy Pham was recalled from AAA-Memphis on June 18, and struggling OF'er Randal Grichuk was optioned. Grichuk hit only .206 with 8 HR, and 27 RBI in 62 G.

==== Seth Maness activated, Dean Kiekhefer optioned ====
For the third consecutive day (June 19), the Cardinals recalled (activated) a player, and optioned another. RHP reliever Seth Maness was activated, and Dean Kiekhefer was optioned to AAA-Memphis.

==== Rosenthal removed as 'Closer' ====
On June 25, manager Mike Matheny told closer Trevor Rosenthal he would be used in a different role. The move will bump Rosenthal out of a closer's job that has been his since late in 2013. He had a frightful 14.14 ERA in June and 5.63 for the season, and blew a save opportunity on June 24, when he gave up in succession a double, a walk, and then a game-winning three-run home run when leading 3–1 against the Seattle Mariners. He averaged 7.9 walks per 9 inn. His percentage of first-pitch strikes was only 61%. Matheny has not named a replacement closer, but said he will instead consider Seung Hwan Oh, Kevin Siegrist, and Jonathan Broxton as options for future save situations. Oh compiled 357 career saves pitching in Korea and Japan, and currently ranks among the top eight National League relievers in ERA (1.66), strikeouts (51), Holds (14) and WHIP (0.79). Broxton was an All-Star closer for the Dodgers in 2009 and 2010. He has compiled 118 career saves, though none since 2014. Siegrist is the only Cardinals reliever besides Rosenthal to close a game (May 12) this season. He has tallied seven career saves and entered Saturday with a season ERA of 2.79.

==== Cardinals tie franchise record with 13 extra-base hits ====
The Cardinals tied a franchise record, not seen since 1940, with 13 extra-base hits (6 home runs, 5 doubles, 2 triples) in an 11–6 win against the Seattle Mariners, at Safeco Field on June 26. The six home runs, second time in a game this season (April 15), boosted the team total to 101. They had 137 in all of 2015, and 105 in 2014. Matt Carpenter tripled, and hit two home runs in the barrage of 17 hits. Tommy Pham also hit two home runs. Jedd Gyorko hit one, as did Matt Holliday, the 150th for him as a Cardinals' player. All six home runs were solo blasts and all came in the sixth-ninth innings. The six home runs were one short of the seven for the franchise record, set in 1996, and 1913.

==== Brayan Pena activated, Eric Fryer DFA ====
Backup catcher Brayan Pena was activated prior to the game on June 28, after missing 75 games on the DL. Eric Fryer was designated for assignment. These moves drop the 40-man roster personnel to 38.

==== Cardinals worst in NL Base-running ====
Through the games on June 28, the Cardinals are the worst base-running team in the NL. The stat is called BsR, explained on the stat site Fangraphs as an all-encompassing base running statistic that considers "stolen bases, caught stealings, and other base running plays (taking extra bases, being thrown out on the bases, etc)." A BsR number of six is "great," while zero is "average" and negative-six is "awful." The Padres actually lead the NL with an astounding 12.2 BsR, while the Cubs are at 9.7. The Cards are minus-9.7. In 2015, the Cards finished 15th in baseball with a 0.7 BsR, essentially right at the league average.

==== Cardinals below .400 at Home ====
The Cardinals ended June with a 15–23 (.395) home record. The team won 50-plus home games in each of Mike Matheny's first four seasons, has now lost seven consecutive home games. They are 25–15 (.625) in away games, trailing only the Cubs and Giants. The Cardinals haven't finished a season with a losing home record since 1999. That team finished 75–86 overall.

Brandon Moss hit the longest home run in Busch Stadium history in a 4–2 loss to Kansas City on June 30, which traveled 477 feet (145 m), and to that point, was the second-longest home run of the season in the major leagues.

=== July ===
==== Kevin Siegrist on DL ====
Newly appointed part-time closer Kevin Siegrist had his season interrupted with a bout of mononucleosis. He was placed on the DL July 1, retroactive to June 30. Sam Tuivailala was recalled.

==== Yadier Molina gets 1,500th Hit; Seung Hwan Oh his first save ====
Playing Milwaukee on July 2, Yadier Molina recorded his 1,500th career hit, becoming the 34th catcher in MLB history, and second for the Cardinals, after Ted Simmons. Oh recorded his first MLB save by pitching a perfect ninth with two strikeouts.

==== Cardinals 43–38 after First One-Half ====
After the 9–8 win on July 3, the club is 43–38 at the end of the first half of the season. Their third consecutive Home win raises it to 18–23 (.439). Away, they are 25–15 (.625). In 2015, the club was 55–26 (.679) at Home, 45–36 (.556) Away.

==== Brandon Moss on DL, Randal Grichuk recalled ====
On July 5, Infielder/Outfielder Brandon Moss was placed on the DL because of a sprained left ankle. Randal Grichuk was recalled.

==== Matt Carpenter named to NL All-Star team ====
On July 5, Matt Carpenter was named as a reserve (3B) to the NL All-Star team in San Diego, July 12.

==== Brayan Pena back on DL, Alberto Rosario purchased ====
Brayan Pena was back on the DL on July 6, with a left knee inflammation, after making only two starts after activated on June 28. He started July 5's game and went 0-for-3 and allowed a passed ball, a wild pitch and two stolen bases. The club purchased Alberto Rosario from AAA-Memphis.

==== Sweeps for the Cards don't mean much ====
The Cardinals had swept 4 teams this season coming into July. In the 2 series following each sweep, they are 9–15. After the sweep of the Brewers in the beginning of July, they lost 3 of 4 to the Pirates, winning the last game to make that record 10–18. They then went to Milwaukee, losing the 1st game, but came back to win the final 2. Now 12–19 after sweeping an opponent.

==== Matt Carpenter on DL, will miss All-Star Game ====
Matt Carpenter strained his right oblique muscle swinging at a pitch against the Pirates on July 6, and won't be able to play in the July 12 All-Star Game. Aledmys Diaz will replace him on that roster. Entering Thursday (July 7), Diaz's .319 average led NL shortstops. He ranked second with a .534 slugging percentage, and 54 runs scored. He is the first Cardinals' rookie since Albert Pujols to make the All-Star team. Carpenter is the fourth player to go on the DL in the last week. As a leadoff hitter, Carpenter entered the day leading the NL with a .421 on-base percentage, and a .991 OPS. He also ranks among the league's top six in doubles (25), extra-base hits (44), walks (58), triples (5), runs (56), and slugging percentage (.570).

==== Siegrist activated, Tuivailala optioned ====
Before the first game after the All-Star Game break, on July 15, LH reliever Kevin Siegrist was activated from the DL, after missing 10 games. Sam Tuivailala was optioned to AAA.

==== Wainwright pitches 3-hit shutout ====
Adam Wainwright pitched a three-hit, complete-game shutout and 5–0 win against Miami on July 15; the first hit he allowed was a double to Adeiny Hechavarria in the sixth inning. It was Wainwright's 10th career shutout, and 22nd complete game, coming on the night of celebrating the 10th anniversary and tribute to the 2006 World Series championship team. Wainwright was a reliever, and threw the final, winning pitch in that World Series. It was the sixth shutout by the team in 2016, against four times being shutout. The Marlins, who have four players in the lineup batting higher than .300, were shut out for just the fourth time this year.

==== Cardinals sweep Padres and their former infielder Gyorko contributes big ====
In the consecutive starts against the Milwaukee Brewers and San Diego Padres on July 10 and 18, Mike Leake struck out at least ten batters in consecutive games for the first time in his career, after previously having two total ten-strikeout games in 189 starts. Covering his previous 48 2/3 innings, he had struck out 45 batters while walking three.

In the first three games of the July 18–21 series against the Padres, Jedd Gyorko homered in each game. That included a streak of five consecutive games against San Diego with a home run, totaling six. He also had 13 hits in 21 at bats with 10 RBI. He had hit the go-ahead home run in both of the first two games of the series, including driving in all three in the 3–2 win in the second game. By saving both games of a doubleheader on July 20, Seung-hwan Oh was the first Cardinals pitcher to do so since Jason Isringhausen in 2004. On July 21, with a 5–5 tie in the bottom of the ninth, Aledmys Díaz batted against Carlos Villanueva with the bases loaded and singled home the game-winning run for his first career walk-off hit.

==== Matt Adams wins 16-inn. game ====
On July 22, while playing the Los Angeles Dodgers, Matt Adams hit a 444 feet (135 m) home run in the 16th inning for walk-off, 4–3, win. It was the second time in his career he had hit a walk-off home run in the 16th inning.

==== Mike Mayers to make debut July 24 ====
The Cardinals announced on July 23 that they had selected the contract of right-hand pitcher Mike Mayers to major his major league debut and start the following day against the Dodgers, a Sunday nationally televised game on ESPN at Busch Stadium. Reliever Miguel Socolovich was optioned to AAA-Memphis. The club will be the last team in the Majors to employ a sixth starting pitcher this season when Mayers takes the mound. The need to find a fill-in starter was the result of the Cardinals having to play a doubleheader on July 20, and then a 16-inn. game on July 22. He was destroyed by the Dodgers, giving up 9 runs, all earned, 8 hits (one Double, two HRs), walking two, striking out only one in just 1.1 IP. He endured the shortest start by a pitcher making his Major League debut in 12 years, and the first Cardinals pitcher in 92 years to allow six first-inning runs in his debut. His early exit meant that a bullpen two days removed from covering 10 innings had to shoulder another 7 2/3. Seth Maness threw a career-high 53 pitches over 3 2/3 innings to settle things.

==== Cardinals option Mayers, purchase Jerome Williams, Walden to 60-day DL ====
After the Mayers' debacle the previous night, on July 25, the Cardinals optioned him back to AAA, and purchased the contract of RHP Jerome Williams, 34. To make room for him on the 40-man roster, Jordan Walden was transferred from the 15-day to the 60-day disabled list.

==== Rosenthal on DL, Kiekhefer recalled ====
RHP Reliever Trevor Rosenthal was placed on the 15-day disabled list July 26, from a right shoulder inflammation in his rotator cuff. LHP Dean Kiekhefer was recalled from AAA. RHP Sam Tuivailala will be recalled after the opener of that day's double-header to serve as the 26th man.

==== Cardinals win in 9th vs. NY Mets, end Familia's save streak ====
The Cardinals won the scintillating back-and-forth rubber game 5–4 on July 27, in New York with a two-run ninth-inning rally, pushing them past that team in the Wild Card standings. Yadier Molina tied the game 4–4 with a one-out double to centerfield in the top of the ninth, and later, a two-out pinch-hit double by Kolten Wong gave them the deciding fifth run. It was the first blown save by Mets' closer Jeurys Familia, who had 36 for the season going into the ninth inning, since July 30, 2015. He had 52 consecutive saves in that span of 363 days (excluding the 2015 playoffs), the third longest streak in history.

==== Cardinals have best Road record in MLB, move into second Wild Card spot ====
With their 11–6 win in Miami July 29, the Cardinals have a 31–17 (.646) Road record, best in baseball. Their Home record is 25–30 (.455), for a 56–47 record, nine-games-over .500 high point for the season. They also moved past the Marlins into the second Wild Card spot, behind the Dodgers, who have a two-game lead. The game marked the 10th time this season that the Cardinals have scored 11 or more runs in a game. From 2014 to 2015, the club reached that level of offensive output only five times. The burst of scoring snapped a streak of six consecutive one-run wins by the club.

==== Cardinals trade OF Charlie Tilson to Chicago White Sox for LHP Zach Duke ====
On the day before the non-waiver trade deadline this year (Mon. Aug. 1, 3pm), the Cardinals traded outfielder Charlie Tilson for LHP reliever Zach Duke, 33. Duke led the AL with 53 appearances mostly in a setup role which is how the Cardinals plan to use him, posting 2–0, 2.63 ERA and 1.25 WHIP over 37 2/3 innings. Duke is under contract in 2017, earning $5 mil. this year and $5.5 mil. next year. LH batters hit .264 against him compared to .182 for righties, a backwards split contrasting with the usual split for pitchers. But RH batters have walked 13 times, giving them a .325 OBP against Duke, compared to him walking LH batters only 3 times for a .299 OBP.

==== Home 25–30, Away 31–19 ====
At the end of July, the Cardinals HOME record was 25–30 (.455), AWAY record 31–19 (.620).

=== August ===
==== Aledmys Diaz to DL ====
All-Star shortstop Aledmys Diaz (26 on August 1), will go on the DL August 2, with a hairline fracture in his right thumb. He was hit by a pitch on July 31, from Marlins' starter Andrew Cashner. He was expected to miss several weeks. Jhonny Peralta will take over at shortstop when he comes off the DL, August 2. Diaz was hitting .312/.376/.518 with 14 home runs and 57 RBIs. He was the only Cardinals' player to appear in last month's All-Star Game.

==== Brandon Moss and Jhonny Peralta activated from DL, Zach Duke added ====
Brandon Moss (missed 25 G), and Jhonny Peralta (missed 15 G) were activated from the DL on August 2. Recent trade LH-reliever Zach Duke was added to the roster. To make room, OF Randal Grichuk and LH-reliever Dean Kiekhefer were optioned to AAA Memphis.

==== Tyler Lyons on DL ====
The rash of debilitating injuries continued on August 2, when it was determined after the game that LH-reliever Tyler Lyons had a stress reaction on his sore right knee, and would be placed on the DL, August 3. He had undergone treatment, but a scan revealed it was more than just discomfort. The move to the DL was retroactive to July 31, and Dean Kiekhefer was recalled from Memphis.

==== Carpenter activated from DL, Kiekhefer optioned ====
Infielder Matt Carpenter was activated on August 5, after missing 24 games from his in-game July 6 injury. LH-reliever Dean Kiekhefer was optioned to AAA-Memphis.

==== Cardinals lose series to worst team in baseball ====
The Cardinals before the August 5 game (57–51 .528) lost two of three games to the worst team—with the fewest runs scored in baseball, the Atlanta Braves, (39–69 .361), thanks to the final two games. The relief pitchers in the ninth inning of game two (5–13) were blasted for six runs, and starter-ace Adam Wainwright was hit hard for six runs in the first two innings in game three (3–6), although kept in the game through six innings giving up nine hits in total, but no more runs. Carlos Martinez now 10–7, and Wainwright now 9–6, took the losses. The team has now lost consecutive series, six of eight games, against last-place clubs (Cincinnati Reds and Braves). The team dropped to 1/2 game behind the Miami Marlins for the final Wild Card spot.

==== Wildest and largest 9th inning comeback win all season ====
In the wildest and largest ninth-inning comeback win all season, the Cardinals at home on August 8, scored all five of their runs in the bottom of the ninth after two outs, for a 5–4 win. Previously, the team was an awful 2–45 when trailing after eight innings. The team fell into a 0–4 hole, and were 0-for-11 with runners in scoring position. It was the 10th time in the last 15 games that a starter could not get to the sixth inning. Down to his last strike at 1–2, Brandon Moss got the tying run in with a bases-loaded walk, and Yadier Molina then finished off the improbable comeback win by getting hit in the ribs by a pitch. The Cardinals have won three of the last four Major League games to end on a walk-off hit-by-pitch. It happened most recently for St. Louis on Aug. 14, 2014, when Jon Jay took a pitch off his body. That was also against the Reds. With the win, the team got its 59th win against 53 losses, tying the Miami Marlins for the second Wild Card spot with 50 games remaining in the season. Michael Wacha could go only five innings, as the fifth starter in a week to not get to the sixth inning.

==== Michael Wacha on DL, Alex Reyes purchased, Pena to 60-day DL ====
RHP Michael Wacha was placed on the DL with right shoulder inflammation on August 9, the day after his five-inning start. Backup catcher Brayan Pena was transferred to the 60-day DL, to make room for the Cardinals purchasing their long-awaited, ninth-best prospect in baseball, RHP Alex Reyes from AAA-Memphis, and added him to the roster. He made his debut that evening (20 days before his 22nd birthday), pitching a perfect ninth inning in getting his first batter to strike out, with a speed gun registering 101.4 mph. The next two batters were ground outs.

==== Matt Adams on DL, Grichuk recalled ====
The merry-go-round on yet another Cardinals' player injured and to the DL continues, this time it is first-baseman Matt Adams early on August 11, with a right shoulder inflammation. Some extra throwing work earlier in the week may have triggered the injury. It was not considered prudent to have Adams stay unplayable on the bench with four big games in Chicago on Aug. 11–14, against the division leading Cubs (71–41 .634), on a season-high nine-game winning streak. The Cardinals are 12 games behind (60–54 .526), going 4–6 on their last ten games, but tied with the Miami Marlins for the final Wild Card spot, with 48 games to go. Outfielder Randal Grichuk was recalled from AAA.

==== Matt Holliday fractures thumb, heads to DL ====
For the 11th time since July 1, another Cardinals' player is headed to the DL. Matt Holliday had his right thumb fractured from a HBP from Cubs' reliever Mike Montgomery in the 10th inning of their first game of the four-game series, August 11. It will also be the fifth Cardinals' player on the DL since the beginning of August. Four of the 10 who were on the DL have returned to the active roster.

==== Luke Weaver makes debut, Reyes first win, ends Cubs 11-game win streak ====
Luke Weaver made his debut in Chicago on August 13 ending their 11-game unbeaten streak in the month, pitching four innings, giving up just two runs on four hits (Double and two-run HR by Addison Russell), striking out three, and walking three. Alex Reyes gets his first major league win in relief, pitching three innings (fifth-seventh), giving up only one hit, while walking one and striking out three. Brandon Moss hit his 20th home run, a solo blast in the sixth, cutting the Chicago lead to 2–1. Jedd Gyorko hit his 17th home run in the seventh, a solo blast that tied the score. Two runs on a wild pitch and a bases-loaded walk gave the Birds a 4–2 lead. But the big blow was then a grand slam in the eighth inning by 25th birthday boy Randal Grichuk. It was only the second time a Cardinals' player has hit a grand slam on his birthday, with Colby Rasmus the first. It was the first slam by a Cardinals' player at Wrigley Field since Adam Kennedy in 2008. Grichuk has hit two home runs since his recall from AAA on August 11.

==== Seth Maness to DL, Sam Tuivailala recalled, Holliday to have surgery ====
For the 12th time since July 1, and sixth for August, a Cardinals' player is headed to the DL. Reliever Seth Maness on August 16 came aboard the DL train for the second time in 2016 (May 14 – June 19), missing 31 games. He will undergo season-ending Tommy John surgery on August 18, missing the remaining 44 games in 2016, and maybe all of the 2017 season. Reliever Sam Tuivailala was recalled. Matt Holliday will have surgery August 17 on his fractured right thumb. His prognosis for returning before the end of the season is unknown. After a medical review of his injury, Maness had surgery to fix his Ulnar collateral ligament of elbow joint instead of Tommy John surgery ligament replacement, drastically reducing his recovery time from 12 to 15 months to 6–8 months, which would make him available for Spring Training in 2017.

==== Luke Weaver gets first win ====
Rookie Luke Weaver got his first major league win (now 1–1), at home in the first of a three-game set against the Oakland Athletics, winning 3–1 on August 26. He celebrated his 23rd birthday on the 21st. Jedd Gyorko gave him all the runs he would need with a two-run home run in the first inning. Weaver became the sixth Cardinals' pitcher since 1913 to strike out seven in his home debut. He gave up just four hits (Double and a Home Run) and two walks in six innings. His ERA dropped to 3.60 and WHIP to 1.18 with 22 strikeouts, against 17 hits and five walks in his season total of 18.2 innings. Native St. Louisan and starter, lefty Ross Detwiler picked up the loss (now 1–3), going 5.1 innings. The A's haven't played in St. Louis since 2010.

==== Yadier Molina 10th highest in Cardinals games played ====
Yadier Molina played in his 1,580th game as a member of the St. Louis Cardinals on August 26, 10th all-time. He tied Rogers Hornsby and Ray Lankford on the list of most games played by a Cardinals' player.

==== Alex Reyes to make first MLB start ====
Alex Reyes, 21, will make his first MLB start at home on August 27, while Mike Leake recovers from a case of the shingles. He turns 22 on August 29. As a reliever, he has pitched 9 1/3 innings, has held opponents to five hits and no runs. He's struck out 13 and walked four. In 14 starts with Triple-A Memphis this season, Reyes went 2–3 with a 5.23 ERA and 1.454 WHIP. Though he averaged 12.5 strikeouts per nine innings, Reyes was often hampered by a lack of efficiency and lapses in command. Nevertheless, his repertoire—highlighted by a fastball that can reach triple digits, a curveball and changeup—makes him one of the franchise's most hyped prospects in years. Reyes ranked by MLB Pipeline as the Cardinals' No. 1 prospect and as the eighth-best prospect in baseball. Leake, who is 9–9 with a 4.56 ERA, had not previously missed a start this season.

As of August 27, with Carlos Martinez, 24 (born on Sep. 21), Alex Reyes, 21 (born on Aug. 29), and Luke Weaver, 23, (born on Aug. 21) all in the rotation, the Cardinals have three of the most young starting pitching talents in baseball.

Reyes' start on August 27, at home against the Oakland Athletics showed his potential giving up only two hits (both singles), striking out four and giving up just one run, but also weak spots with lack of command a key factor in his giving up four walks and long innings. He pitched 4 2/3 innings, throwing 89 pitches. His fastball hit 100 mph, has an above-average curve, and mixed in 22 changeups which manager Mike Matheny described as "incredible." Another bright side was starting his major league career with 14 scoreless innings, snapped in that fifth inning. His ERA is now an impressive 0.64 over 14 innings in six games (1 Win, 1 Save), striking out 17, walking eight, giving up seven hits for a 1.07 WHIP. In the game, the team blew a 2–1 lead in the eighth inning, losing 2–3.

==== Cards only 30–37 (.448) at Home, 38–24 (.613) on Road ====
Through August 28, the team continues to struggle for wins at Home, compared to their No. 1 baseball ranking on the Road. The last time the Cardinals lost more Home games than the 37 presently, was in the non-playoff year, 2007. They averaged 52.5 Home wins during Mike Matheny's first four seasons. They would have to win 11 of their final 14 Home games to finish at Home over .500. Statistically, the biggest inconsistency between the team's home and road results has been on the offensive side. The Cardinals have averaged 5.58 runs per game and 1.58 homers per game away from Busch Stadium. At home, those averages are 4.4 and 1.28, respectively. The difference in home and road ERAs is negligible.

Cardinals, who hold a half-game lead for the NL's second Wild Card spot, have 19 of their next 26 games will be on the Road, before their final seven games at Home. Given only two NL teams have a worse Home record: the Atlanta Braves (19–44) with a 48–83 record, and the Arizona Diamondbacks (25–43) with a 55–76 record, the large number of games away therotically played into their favour. Their arch-rivals in the Central Division, the Chicago Cubs are a blistering 45–19 (.703) at Home, and an excellent 37–28 (,569) on the Road, for an overall MLB best 82–47 (.636), leading the Cardinals by 14 games, with only 33 games remaining.

==== Mike Leake on DL, Kiekhefer recalled ====
For the 13th time since July 1, and the seventh in August (six in July), a player is placed on the DL. RHP and starter Mike Leake has a severe case of the shingles and wasn't healing fast enough. His DL on August 29, is retroactive to August 22. He is 9–9 with a 4.56 ERA in 25 starts, and eligible to return on Sept. 6. LHP reliever Dean Kiekhefer was recalled.

==== Cardinals fail to maintain .500 ====
Prior to the August 31 game against the Brewers, the Cards had gone into five games this season with the chance to get to 10 games over .500. After the loss to the Brewers, they are 0–6, while being outscored 15–40 in those games.

=== September ===
==== Matt Adams activated from DL ====
On September 2, Matt Adams was activated from the DL, after missing 18 games since August 10, from his right shoulder inflammation. He was hitting .248 with 12 home runs and 44 RBIs before his injury. He played five rehab games at AAA-Memphis, hitting .188 including 1 double and 1 home run. The rosters expanded on September 1, allowing the present 26 active players, while 14 remain inactive or on the DL.

==== Brayan Pena and Carson Kelly added to roster, Maness transferred to 60-day DL ====
On September 4, catcher Brayan Pena was activated from the 60-day DL, and AAA-Memphis rookie catcher Carson Kelly, 22, was purchased. Shortstop Dean Anna was designated for assignment to make room for Kelly on the 40-man roster. Seth Maness was transferred from the 15-day to the 60-day DL.

==== Carson Kelly makes his debut in Pittsburgh with hit ====
Newly called-up catcher Carson Kelly made his debut on September 5, against the Pittsburgh Pirates with a line-drive double in the eighth inning, and then scored his first run. He also was credited with his first assist as catcher in a 2–3 strikeout play.

==== Three final call-ups for September ====
Three final call-ups from the minors happened on September 6, when José Martínez (OF) making his major league debut, and two relievers who were here earlier, Mike Mayers, and Sam Tuivailala.

==== Cardinals tie NL record, 25 consecutive games with a HR ====
Yadier Molina's fourth career grand slam on September 6, gave the 2016 Cardinals an NL record tying 25 consecutive games with at least one home run, matching the San Diego Padres set earlier this year. The major league record is 27 games, set by the 2002 Texas Rangers. The grand slam was Molina's first since 2012. It was the team's 197th home run for 2016, leading the NL. Their team record is 235 set in 2000.

==== Cardinals win in 9th inning, trailing with 2-outs ====
In yet another improbable comeback on September 6, the Cardinals won a critical game against the Pittsburgh Pirates, 9–6, with two outs and two strikes against Matt Carpenter in the ninth, trailing 5–6. He homered for the 18th time this season, tying the game at 6-all. Yadier Molina hit a double and then hot-hitting Randal Grichuk smashed his 22nd home run, giving them an 8–6 lead. Jhonny Peralta made it back-to-back with his seventh home run of the year, ending the five-home run night for the Redbirds and a 9–6 win after Seung Hwan Oh got his 16th save. Molina in the first inning hit a grand slam, seventh this year, with Matt Adams adding his 14th homer in the third inning for a 5–0 lead. The Pirates stormed back to take the lead after scoring one in the third, one in the fourth, and four in the fifth inning. Mike Mayers got his first major league win in relief with a scoreless eighth inning, keeping the team just one run behind. His debut on July 24 was one of the worst in MLB history, but this night he was perfect. Carpenter's home run was the first pinch-hit blast of his career, but the 15th by the team this season setting a new MLB record. The previous Major League high had been 14, set by the 2001 Arizona Diamondbacks and 2001 San Francisco Giants. Eight different Cardinals have contributed a pinch-hit homer this season.

==== Activation of Mike Leake from DL ====
Mike Leake, recovered from his two-week fight with shingles, was activated on September 7. He started against the Pirates, who were mired in an eight-game losing streak, longest for them since 2011.

==== Opposing baserunners running wild on pitchers ====
The Cardinals had allowed 69 steals against them through September 8, while they had stolen only 32. Yadier Molina is not at fault as much as the pitchers letting the runners get good jumps, instead of holding them closer to first base. Since his debut in 2004, the team has never allowed more than 64 steals until this year. Molina's pop time—defined as the time elapsed from the moment the pitch hits the catcher's mitt to the moment the intended fielder receives the throw—is the same as it was last year (1.92 seconds), when he allowed 37 stolen bases and ranked third in the National League with a caught-stealing percentage of 41. That pop time ranks seventh best among all catchers in 2016.

The dip in Molina's average arm strength on steal attempts—80.51 mph to 79.85 mph—isn't enough to alone explain the increase in attempts. There is great responsibility on the pitching staff. Mike Leake has allowed a career-high 13 steals for the most on the staff, while Jaime Garcia has allowed 11.

==== Cardinals lose for 38th time at home ====
Another home loss on September 8, gave the Cardinals 38 at home, most since their franchise 2007 season record. They had 30 wins for a .441 winning percentage, with 13 remaining home games. The 12–5 loss to the lowly Milwaukee Brewers dropped them out of the second Wild Card spot. A club that never had a dozen runs scored off it at home last year has now had it happen three times in 2016. Still seeking their first home series win since July, the Cardinals fell to 2–8 in the first game of a homestand with this loss. The last team to advance to postseason play with a losing home record was the 2001 Atlanta Braves.

==== Activation of Aledmys Diaz after missing 36 games ====
Shortstop Aledmys Diaz was activated before the game on September 11, after missing 36 games from a right thumb fracture suffered on July 31. Diaz was hitting .312/.376/.518 with 14 home runs, 25 doubles, 57 RBIs, and 64 runs scored in 96 games at the time of his injury.

==== Cardinals surpass 3 million attendance ====
For the 13th consecutive year starting in 2004, the team surpassed 3 million in home attendance on September 11.

==== Carson Kelly makes first start as catcher ====
Carson Kelly made his first start as catcher on September 11. Fellow rookie Luke Weaver was the starting pitcher. Both started the 2015 season at Class A Advanced Palm Beach. Kelly was taken in the second round in the 2012 draft. Weaver was the Cardinals' first-round pick (27th overall) in the 2014 Draft.

==== Michael Wacha activated ====
Former starter Michael Wacha was activated on September 14, and will be placed in the bullpen as a reliever for the remainder of the season.

==== Cardinals to open 2017 season against Cubs at Busch on April 3 ====
The 2017 season opens for the Cardinals against the Cubs at home on April 3 (3:15 pm tentative) for a three=game set. An opening-series matchup between the Cubs and Cards in St. Louis hasn't happened since 2000. It will be the first time since 2011 that the Cardinals will open the season at home. The Cardinals' schedule is home-heavy early, with 50 of the team's 81 home games to be played before the All-Star break. St. Louis will end the year at home with series against division opponents Chicago (Sept. 25–28) and Milwaukee (Sept. 29-Oct. 1).

==== Trevor Rosenthal activated from DL, Reyes to starter, Garcia to bullpen ====
Former closer Trevor Rosenthal was activated from the DL before the September 15 game. Rosenthal went on the DL July 26, with a 5.13 ERA in 40 appearances. He boasted a strikeout rate of 13 per nine innings, but also had the worst walk rate (7.3) of his career. Alex Reyes was promoted from the bullpen to be a starter, replacing the declining and struggling starter Jaime Garcia. The decision by manager Matheny came two days after Garcia lasted a career-short 1 2/3 innings in his 29th start of the season. Garcia now shifts to the bullpen. His role will be an unfamiliar one, as Garcia hasn't pitched in relief since he was a rookie in 2008. This was not a planned move, but Garcia's 8.23 ERA over his last six starts necessitated a change by the Cardinals, who are locked in a tight Wild Card race with the Giants and Mets. Reyes has made a strong first impression since his Aug. 9 callup. Despite a walk rate of 5.1, he's posted a 1.29 ERA and struck out 34 over 28 innings. In his two previous spot starts, Reyes allowed three runs in 10 2/3 innings.

==== Cardinals eliminated from NL Central title ====
With their 70th loss in San Francisco (76 wins, .521) on September 15, the Cardinals were officially eliminated from the NL Central title. They are 17 games behind the Cubs with 16 games to play. The Cubs having lost earlier, clinched with their previous 93 wins (53 losses .637). It was the first NL Central title for them since 2008. The win moved the Giants one game in front of the New York Mets and two games ahead of the Cardinals in the National League Wild Card standings.

==== Wainwright sets DH-era RBI record ====
With four RBI against Colorado on September 20, Adam Wainwright increased his season total to 18, breaking the record for all pitchers in the designated hitter (DH) era – since 1973 – and the most since Ferguson Jenkins drove in 20 for the Cubs in 1971. He presently has 13 hits (7 Doubles, 1 Triple, 2 HRs) in 58 AB for a .224/.250/.483 line. For the modern Cardinals' record, Bob Gibson had 19 RBIs in 1970, with 33 hits (3 Doubles, 1 Triple, 2 HR) in 109 AB for a .303/.347/.404 line.

==== Cardinals' 40,000+ attendance game streak snapped ====
The Cardinals had a notable attendance streak snapped on September 26, as the club did not draw at least 40,000 at Busch Stadium for the first time since Sept. 24, 2013. The streak spanned 240 games. Monday's announced attendance was 34,942 in a miserable 2–15 loss, keeping them one game out of the second Wild Card spot with six games to play.

==== Cardinals activate Matt Holliday, refuse his $17 mil. 2017 option ====
Long-time Cardinals' outfielder since 2009, Matt Holliday was activated from the DL on September 30, with a present .242/.318/.450 line with 19 home runs and 60 RBIs. He was informed earlier in the week that the team would not pick up his 2017 option for $17 million, and would pay the contractual $1 million buyout.

He signed a $120 million seven-year extension deal after the 2009 season in the largest contract in Cardinals' history. He averaged 147 games played for the first five years, but injuries severely hurt his playing time in 2015 and this year. He posted five 20-homer seasons and four 90-RBI seasons. Holliday produced a cumulative WAR of 24.1 in those eight years. According to Fangraphs, which created a tool to convert WAR to dollars in order to estimate the value of a player, Holliday has been worth $168.6 million since 2010. He was active in the community with many charity appearances. He will turn 37 in mid-January 2017, after playing 13 major league seasons, the first five with the Colorado Rockies, and first half of 2009 with the Oakland Athletics until traded on July 24 to the Cardinals. After what could be his final at-bat with the Cardinals at home on September 30, against the Pittsburgh Pirates, he hit his first ever pinch-hit home run, his 20th of the season, giving him 61 RBIs for the season, in his 980th game with the Cardinals that included six 20-homer seasons. With his 20th home run, Holliday became the sixth Cardinals' player to reach that mark, tying the NL record held by the 1965 Milwaukee Braves, and later 2003 Atlanta Braves. The homer also extended the team's pinch-hit home run major league record, now 17.

He singled in a crucial second run in the 4–3 come-from-behind win over the Pirates, in his second consecutive pinch-hit appearance, October 1, giving him 62 RBIs for the season. His 2016 statistics now show for 109 games played in 382 at-bats: .246/.322/.461 with a .782 OPS, with 48 runs, 94 hits (including 20 doubles, 1 triple), 35 walks, 71 strikeouts, 8 hit-by-pitches, and 9 ground-into-double plays, with a 107 OPS+. For his eight years with the Cardinals, he hit .293/.380/.494 with an .874 OPS, and 138 OPS+ in 981 games and 3,581 at-bats. He gave a brief appearance in left field in the team's 162nd game, for 110 games in 2016, and 982 games as a Cardinals' player. The team has not completely ruled out a new contract in 2017 with him, although neither side expects it to happen.

==== Cardinals attendance ====
The attendance (38–43 .469) was 3,444,490 down 2.2% from the 3,520,889 in 2015. Their attendance is second in the 15-team NL only to the Los Angeles Dodgers that has over four times the St. Louis metro population and a stadium that has a capacity of 56,000, over 13,000 more than Busch Stadium. Away, the club was 48–33 (.593), among the best in MLB. Scored 779 runs, giving up 712, +67. In 2015, scored 647, allowed 525, +122. Home record was the worst for the team since 1997, at 41–40 (.506). Before that, the 1990 Cardinals were 34–47 (.420).

== Schedule and results ==
Regular Season Schedule (calendar style)
Regular Season Schedule (sortable text)
National Broadcast Schedule (all teams), EDT

Most games are broadcast on Fox Sports Midwest.

=== Game log ===
2016 St. Louis Cardinals Game Log, 86–76 (.531)
April: 12–12 (.500) (Home: 5–6; Away: 7–6)

#	Date	Opponent	Score	Win	Loss	Save	Attendance	Record	Box / L10
1	April 3	@ Pirates	1–4	Liriano (1–0)	**Wainwright** (0–1)		39,500	0–1	0–1
2	April 5	@ Pirates	5–6 (11)	Lobstein (1–0)	**Maness** (0–1)		26,049	0–2	0–2
3	April 6	@ Pirates	1–5	Nicasio (1–0)	**Leake** (0–1)	Melancon (1)	14,890	0–3	0–3
4	April 8	@ Braves	7–4	**Siegrist** (1–0)	O'Flaherty (0–2)	**Rosenthal** (1)	24,824	1–3	1–3
5	April 9	@ Braves	12–2	**Martínez** (1–0)	Teherán (0–1)		33,471	2–3	2–3
6	April 10	@ Braves	12–7	**Oh** (1–0)	Johnson (0–1)	**Rosenthal** (2)	23,214	3–3	3–3
7	April 11	Brewers	10–1	**Wacha** (1–0)	Jungmann (0–1)		47,608	4–3	4–3
8	April 13	Brewers	4–6	Blazek (1–0)	**Rosenthal** (0–1)	Jeffress (4)	40,994	4–4	4–4
9	April 14	Brewers	7–0	**García** (1–0)	Peralta (0–3)		40,168	5–4	5–4
10	April 15	Reds	14–3	**Martínez** (2–0)	Melville (0–1)		44,997	6–4	6–4
11	April 16	Reds	8–9	Finnegan (1–0)	**Wainwright** (0–2)	Hoover (1)	44,425	6–5	6–4
12	April 17	Reds	4–3	**Siegrist** (2–0)	Ohlendorf (2–1)	**Rosenthal** (3)	46,268	7–5	7–3
13	April 18	Cubs	0–5	Lackey (3–0)	**Leake** (0–2)	–	45,432	7–6	7–3
14	April 19	Cubs	1–2	Hammel (2–0)	**García** (1–1)	Rondón (3)	43,841	7–7	6–4
15	April 20	Cubs	5–3	**Martínez** (3–0)	Hendricks (1–2)	**Rosenthal** (4)	43,093	8–7	6–4
16	April 22	@ Padres	1–4	Cashner (1–1)	**Wainwright** (0–3)	Rodney (3)	30,074	8–8	5–5
17	April 23	@ Padres	11–2	**Wacha** (2–0)	Quackenbush (1–1)		31,688	9–8	5–5
18	April 24	@ Padres	8–5	**Siegrist** (3–0)	Maurer (0–1)	**Rosenthal** (5)	37,395	10–8	6–4
19	April 25	@ Diamondbacks	7–12	Greinke (2–2)	**Bowman** (0–1)		18,208	10–9	5–5
20	April 26	@ Diamondbacks	8–2	**Martínez** (4–0)	Miller (0–2)		19,074	11–9	5–5
21	April 27	@ Diamondbacks	11–4	**Wainwright** (1–3)	Corbin (1–3)		18,339	12–9	6–4
22	April 28	@ Diamondbacks	0–3	De La Rosa (3–3)	**Wacha** (2–1)	Ziegler (5)	18,933	12–10	5–5
23	April 29	Nationals	4–5	Strasburg (4–0)	**Leake** (0–3)	Papelbon (8)	45,246	12–11	5–5
24	April 30	Nationals	1–6	Ross (3–0)	**García** (1–2)		42,723	12–12	5–5

May: 16–13 (.552) (Home: 8–9; Away: 8–4)

#	Date	Opponent	Score	Win	Loss	Save	Attendance	Record	Box / L10
25	May 1	Nationals	1–6	Scherzer (3–1)	**Martínez** (4–1)		42,933	12–13	4–6
26	May 2	Phillies	10–3	**Wainwright** (2–3)	Hellickson (2–2)		40,438	13–13	5–5
27	May 3	Phillies	0–1	Nola (2–2)	**Wacha** (2–2)	Gomez (9)	40,087	13–14	4–6
28	May 4	Phillies	5–4	**Siegrist** (4–0)	Gómez (2–1)		40,725	14–14	4–6
29	May 5	Phillies	4–0	**García** (2–2)	Eickhoff (1–4)		41,818	15–14	5–5
30	May 6	Pirates	2–4	Liriano (3–1)	**Martínez** (4–2)	Melancon (8)	43,093	15–15	4–6
31	May 7	Pirates	6–4	**Rosenthal** (1–1)	Schugel (0–1)		42,338	16–15	4–6
32	May 8	Pirates	5–10	Cole (3–3)	**Wacha** (2–3)	Melancon (9)	42,441	16–16	4–6
33	May 10	@ Angels	8–1	**Leake** (1–3)	Santiago (2–2)		30,679	17–16	5–5
34	May 11	@ Angels	5–2	**García** (3–2)	Shoemaker (1–5)	**Rosenthal** (6)	33,378	18–16	6–4
35	May 12	@ Angels	12–10	**Wainwright** (3–3)	Weaver (3–2)	**Siegrist** (1)	35,413	19–16	7–3
36	May 13	@ Dodgers	4–8	Stripling (1–2)	**Wacha** (2–4)	Jansen (12)	46,716	19–17	6–4
37	May 14	@ Dodgers	3–5	Kazmir (3–3)	**Martínez** (4–3)	Jansen (13)	48,459	19–18	6–4
38	May 15	@ Dodgers	5–2	**Leake** (2–3)	Howell (1–1)	**Rosenthal** (7)	51,350	20–18	6–4
39	May 17	Rockies	1–3	Bettis (4–2)	**García** (3–3)	McGee (13)	41,109	20–19	5–5
40	May 18	Rockies	2–0	**Wainwright** (4–3)	Rusin (1–2)	**Rosenthal** (8)	42,618	21–19	6–4
41	May 19	Rockies	13–7	**Lyons** (1–0)	Gray (1–2)		43,683	22–19	6–4
42	May 20	Diamondbacks	7–11	Corbin (2–3)	**Martínez** (4–4)	Barrett (1)	43,301	22–20	6–4
43	May 21	Diamondbacks	6–2	**Leake** (3–3)	Ray (2–3)		45,117	23–20	6–4
44	May 22	Diamondbacks	2–7	Greinke (5–3)	**García** (3–4)		43,829	23–21	5–5
45	May 23	Cubs	4–3	**Rosenthal** (2–1)	Warren (3–1)		45,008	24–21	5–5
46	May 24	Cubs	3–12	Hammel (6–1)	**Wacha** (2–5)		44,588	24–22	5–5
47	May 25	Cubs	8–9	Arrieta (9–0)	**Martinez** (4–5)	Rondon (8)	45,565	24–23	5–5
48	May 26	@ Nationals	1–2	Ross (4–4)	**Leake** (3–4)	Papelbon (13)	26,176	24–24	4–6
49	May 27	@ Nationals	6–2	**García** (4–4)	Scherzer (5–4)		30,781	25–24	5–5
50	May 28	@ Nationals	9–4	**Wainwright** (5–3)	González (3–3)		38,274	26–24	5–5
51	May 29	@ Nationals	2–10	Strasburg (9–0)	**Wacha** (2–6)		38,898	26–25	4–6
52	May 30	@ Brewers	6–0	**Martínez** (5–5)	Guerra (3–1)		34,569	27–25	5–5
53	May 31	@ Brewers	10–3	**Leake** (4–4)	Peralta (3–6)		24,487	28–25	5–5

June: 12–13 (.480) (Home: 2–8; Away: 10–5)

#	Date	Opponent	Score	Win	Loss	Save	Attendance	Record	Box / L10
54	June 1	@ Brewers	1–3	Davies (3–3)	**García** (4–5)	Jeffress (13)	24,050	28–26	5–5
55	June 3	Giants	1–5	Cueto (9–1)	**Wainwright** (5–4)		43,560	28–27	4–6
56	June 4	Giants	7–4	**Lyons** (2–0)	Samardzija (7–4)	**Rosenthal** (9)	45,453	29–27	5–5
57	June 5	Giants	6–3	**Martínez** (6–5)	Peavy (2–6)	**Rosenthal** (10)	44,907	30–27	6–4
58	June 7	@ Reds	6–7	Cingrani (1–2)	**Siegrist** (4–1)		24,182	30–28	6–4
59	June 8	@ Reds	12–7	**Bowman** (1–1)	Simon (2–6)		21,376	31–28	6–4
60	June 9	@ Reds	3–2	**Oh** (2–0)	Ohlendorf (4–5)	**Rosenthal** (11)	24,516	32–28	6–4
61	June 10	@ Pirates	9–3 (12)	**Broxton** (1–0)	Nicasio (5–5)		28,417	33–28	7–3
62	June 11	@ Pirates	5–1	**Martínez** (7–5)	Liriano (4–6)	**Rosenthal** (12)	36,962	34–28	7–3
63	June 12	@ Pirates	8–3	**Leake** (5–4)	Niese (6–3)		31,148	35–28	7–3
64	June 14	Astros	2–5	Fister (7–3)	**García** (4–6)	Harris (4)	42,525	35–29	7–3
65	June 15	Astros	1–4	Sipp (1–2)	**Siegrist** (4–2)	Harris (5)	42,008	35–30	7–3
66	June 17	Rangers	0–1	Hamels (7–1)	**Wacha** (2–7)	Dyson (12)	44,064	35–31	6–4
67	June 18	Rangers	3–4	Tolleson (1–2)	**Rosenthal** (2–2)	Diekman (2)	44,375	35–32	5–5
68	June 19	Rangers	4–5	Barnette (4–2)	**Bowman** (1–2)	Dyson (13)	44,897	35–33	5–5
69	June 20	@ Cubs	3–2	**García** (5–6)	Lackey (7–3)	**Rosenthal** (13)	41,166	36–33	5–5
70	June 21	@ Cubs	4–3	**Wainwright** (6–4)	Hammel (7–3)	**Rosenthal** (14)	41,616	37–33	5–5
71	June 22	@ Cubs	7–2	**Wacha** (3–7)	Arrieta (11–2)		41,058	38–33	5–5
72	June 24	@ Mariners	3–4	Roach (1–0)	**Rosenthal** (2–3)		35,746	38–34	4–6
73	June 25	@ Mariners	4–5	Karns (6–2)	**Leake** (5–5)	Cishek (17)	40,431	38–35	3–7
74	June 26	@ Mariners	11–6	**Siegrist** (5–2)	Vincent (2–3)		35,955	39–35	4–6
75	June 27	@ Royals	2–6	Duffy (3–1)	**Wainwright** (6–5)		31,355	39–36	4–6
76	June 28	@ Royals	8–4	**Wacha** (4–7)	Ventura (6–5)		32,909	40–36	5–5
77	June 29	Royals	2–3 (12)	Wang (5–0)	**Maness** (0–2)		44,840	40–37	5–5
78	June 30	Royals	2–4	Gee (3–2)	**Leake** (5–6)	Davis (19)	44,802	40–38	5–5

July: 16–11 (.593) (Home: 10–7; Away: 6–4)

#	Date	Opponent	Score	Win	Loss	Save	Attendance	Record	Box / L10
79	July 1	Brewers	7–1	**García** (6–6)	Garza (1–1)		42,987	41–38	5–5
80	July 2	Brewers	3–0	**Wainwright** (7–5)	Nelson (5–7)	**Oh** (1)	40,573	42–38	5–5
81	July 3	Brewers	9–8	**Wacha** (5–7)	Anderson (4–9)	**Oh** (2)	41,148	43–38	5–5
82	July 4	Pirates	2–4	Niese (7–6)	**Martínez** (7–6)	Feliz (1)	41,850	43–39	5–5
83	July 5	Pirates	2–5	Nicasio (7–6)	**Leake** (5–7)	Melancon (25)	41,444	43–40	5–5
84	July 6	Pirates	5–7	Schugel (2–2)	**Broxton** (1–1)	Melancon (26)	42,693	43–41	4–6
85	July 7	Pirates	5–1	**Wainwright** (8–5)	Glasnow (0–1)		42,144	44–41	5–5
86	July 8	@ Brewers	3–4	Jeffress (2–2)	**Rosenthal** (2–4)		28,343	44–42	4–6
87	July 9	@ Brewers	8–1	**Martínez** (8–6)	Anderson (4–10)		37,101	45–42	5–5
88	July 10	@ Brewers	5–1	**Leake** (6–7)	Guerra (6–2)		42,066	46–42	6–4
ASG	**87th All-Star Game** at Petco Park in San Diego, California, United States								Box
ASG	July 12	**NL All-Stars** 2, AL All-Stars 4		Kluber (CLE)	**Cueto** (SFG)	Britton (BAL)	42,386	43–42–2	Box
ASG	Representing the Cardinals: Carpenter and Díaz								Box
89	July 15	Marlins	6–7	Rodney (1–2)	**Oh** (2–1)	Ramos (28)	42,034	46–43	5–5
90	July 16	Marlins	5–0	**Wainwright** (9–5)	Koehler (6–8)		44,840	47–43	5–5
91	July 17	Marlins	3–6	Barraclough (5–2)	**Broxton** (1–2)	Ramos (29)	43,046	47–44	4–6
92	July 18	Padres	10–2	**Leake** (7–7)	Friedrich (4–6)		40,137	48–44	5–5
–	July 19	Padres	Postponed (rain). Makeup date: July 20th.						
93	July 20	Padres	4–2	**Martínez** (9–6)	Rea (5–4)	**Oh** (3)	40,184	49–44	6–4
94	July 20	Padres	3–2	**García** (7–6)	Clemens (1–1)	**Oh** (4)	41,012	50–44	7–3
95	July 21	Padres	6–5	**Broxton** (2–2)	Villanueva (1–1)		40,134	51–44	7–3
96	July 22	Dodgers	4–3 (16)	**Maness** (1–2)	Norris (5–9)		41,915	52–44	8–2
97	July 23	Dodgers	2–7	Maeda (9–7)	**Leake** (7–8)		45,477	52–45	7–3
98	July 24	Dodgers	6–9	Kazmir (9–3)	**Mayers** (0–1)	Jansen (29)	41,423	52–46	6–4
–	July 25	@ Mets	Postponed (rain). Makeup date: July 26th.						
99	July 26	@ Mets	3–2	**Martínez** (10–6)	Syndergaard (9–5)	**Oh** (5)	–	53–46	7–3
100	July 26	@ Mets	1–3	Colón (9–5)	**García** (7–7)	Familia (36)	37,116	53–47	6–4
101	July 27	@ Mets	5–4	**Broxton** (3–2)	Familia (2–2)	**Oh** (6)	37,851	54–47	7–3
102	July 28	@ Marlins	5–4	**Wacha** (6–7)	Fernández (12–5)	**Oh** (7)	25,060	55–47	7–3
103	July 29	@ Marlins	11–6	**Leake** (8–8)	Ureña (1–3)		27,414	56–47	7–3
104	July 30	@ Marlins	0–11	Phelps (5–5)	**García** (7–8)		25,011	56–48	6–4
105	July 31	@ Marlins	4–5	Ramos (1–0)	**Bowman** (1–3)		23,666	56–49	5–5

August: 14–13 (.519) (Home: 5–7; Away: 9–6)

#	Date	Opponent	Score	Win	Loss	Save	Attendance	Record	Box / L10
106	August 2	@ Reds	5–7	Díaz (1–1)	**Oh** (2–2)		25,270	56–50	4–6
107	August 3	@ Reds	5–4	**Wacha** (7–7)	Reed (0–6)	**Oh** (8)	20,771	57–50	5–5
108	August 4	@ Reds	0–7	Finnegan (7–8)	**Leake** (8–9)		21,119	57–51	5–5
109	August 5	Braves	1–0	**García** (8–8)	De La Cruz (0–4)	**Oh** (9)	42,421	58–51	5–5
110	August 6	Braves	5–13	Hernandez (1–0)	**Martínez** (10–7)		45,468	58–52	5–5
111	August 7	Braves	3–6	Foltynewicz (5–5)	**Wainwright** (9–6)	Johnson (8)	42,960	58–53	4–6
112	August 8	Reds	5–4	**Maness** (2–2)	Cingrani (2–4)		40,616	59–53	4–6
113	August 9	Reds	4–7	Lorenzen (2–0)	**Bowman** (1–4)	Iglesias (1)	40,113	59–54	3–7
114	August 10	Reds	3–2	**Garcia** (9–8)	DeSclafani (6–1)	**Oh** (10)	40,019	60–54	4–6
115	August 11	@ Cubs	3–4 (11)	Montgomery (4–5)	**Duke** (2–1)		40,597	60–55	4–6
116	August 12	@ Cubs	2–13	Arrieta (14–5)	**Wainwright** (9–7)		40,848	60–56	4–6
117	August 13	@ Cubs	8–4	**Reyes** (1–0)	Edwards Jr. (0–1)		41,278	61–56	4–6
118	August 14	@ Cubs	6–4	**Bowman** (2–4)	Rondón (2–3)	**Oh** (11)	41,019	62–56	5–5
119	August 16	@ Astros	8–5	**García** (10–8)	Keuchel (7–12)	**Oh** (12)	30,438	63–56	5–5
120	August 17	@ Astros	8–2	**Martínez** (11–7)	Fister (11–8)		27,508	64–56	6–4
121	August 19	@ Phillies	4–3 (11)	**Oh** (3–2)	Herrmann (0–1)	**Reyes** (1)	20,627	65–56	7–3
122	August 20	@ Phillies	2–4	Hellickson (10–7)	**Weaver** (0–1)	**Gomez** (33)	32,288	65–57	6–4
123	August 21	@ Phillies	9–0	**Leake** (9–9)	Velasquez (8–6)		20,127	66–57	7–3
124	August 23	Mets	4–7	Gsellman (1–0)	**García** (10–9)	**Familia** (42)	40,082	66–58	6–4
125	August 24	Mets	8–1	**Martínez** (12–7)	deGrom (7–7)		40,053	67–58	7–3
126	August 25	Mets	6–10	Lugo (1–2)	**Wainwright** (9–8)		40,023	67–59	7–3
127	August 26	Athletics	3–1	**Weaver** (1–1)	Detwiler (1–3)	**Oh** (13)	40,221	68–59	7–3
128	August 27	Athletics	2–3	Coulombe (2–1)	**Bowman** (2–5)	Madson (26)	41,607	68–60	6–4
129	August 28	Athletics	4–7	Triggs (1–1)	**Garcia** (10–10)	Madson (27)	42,239	68–61	5–5
130	August 29	@ Brewers	6–5	**Socolovich** (1–0)	Thornburg (5–5)	**Oh** (14)	18,663	69–61	5–5
131	August 30	@ Brewers	2–1 (10)	**Oh** (4–2)	Knebel (0–2)	**Duke** (2)	22,918	70–61	5–5
132	August 31	@ Brewers	1–3	Garza (5–6)	**Weaver** (1–2)	Thornburg (6)	17,645	70–62	5–5

September: 14–14 (.500) (Home: 6–6; Away: 8–8)

#	Date	Opponent	Score	Win	Loss	Save	Attendance	Record	Box / L10
133	September 2	@ Reds	2–3	Iglesias (2–1)	**Oh** (4–3)		21,441	70–63	4–6
134	September 3	@ Reds	1–9	Straily (11–7)	**Garcia** (10–11)		31,118	70–64	4–6
135	September 4	@ Reds	5–2	**Martinez** (13–7)	Adleman (2–3)	**Oh** (15)	26,985	71–64	4–6
136	September 5	@ Pirates	12–6	**Wainwright** (10–8)	Kuhl (3–3)		26,297	72–64	5–5
137	September 6	@ Pirates	9–7	**Mayers** (1–1)	Watson (2–4)	**Oh** (16)	20,369	73–64	5–5
138	September 7	@ Pirates	3–4	Williams (1–0)	**Reyes** (1–1)	Watson (11)	21,523	73–65	5–5
139	September 8	Brewers	5–12	Guerra (8–3)	**Garcia** (10–12)		40,416	73–66	5–5
140	September 9	Brewers	4–3	**Martinez** (14–7)	Nelson (7–14)	**Oh** (17)	42,647	74–66	5–5
141	September 10	Brewers	5–1	**Wainwright** (11–8)	Knebel (1–3)		45,440	75–66	5–5
142	September 11	Brewers	1–2	Thornburg (6–5)	**Siegrist** (5–3)		44,703	75–67	5–5
143	September 12	Cubs	1–4	Hendricks (15–7)	**Leake** (9–10)	Chapman (34)	43,397	75–68	5–5
144	September 13	Cubs	4–2	**Reyes** (2–1)	Hammel (14–9)	**Siegrist** (2)	44,060	76–68	6–4
145	September 14	Cubs	0–7	Lester (17–4)	**Martinez** (14–8)		44,701	76–69	5–5
146	September 15	@ Giants	2–6	Cueto (16–5)	**Wainwright** (11–9)		41,210	76–70	4–6
147	September 16	@ Giants	2–8	Moore (11–11)	**Weaver** (1–3)		41,278	76–71	3–7
148	September 17	@ Giants	3–2	**Oh** (5–3)	Casilla (2–5)		41,403	77–71	4–6
149	September 18	@ Giants	3–0	**Reyes** (3–1)	Suarez (3–4)	**Oh** (18)	41,324	78–71	5–5
150	September 19	@ Rockies	5–3	**Martinez** (15–8)	Anderson (5–6)	**Siegrist** (3)	26,783	79–71	5–5
151	September 20	@ Rockies	10–5	**Wainwright** (12–9)	de la Rosa (8–9)		28,665	80–71	5–5
152	September 21	@ Rockies	1–11	Marquez (1–0)	**Weaver** (1–4)		26,099	80–72	5–5
153	September 23	@ Cubs	0–5	Arrieta (18–7)	**Leake** (9–11)		40,791	80–73	5–5
154	September 24	@ Cubs	10–4	**Reyes** (4–1)	Hammel (15–10)		40,785	81–73	5–5
155	September 25	@ Cubs	1–3	Lester (19–4)	**Martinez** (15–9)	Chapman (36)	40,859	81–74	5–5
156	September 26	Reds	2–15	Adleman (3–4)	**Garcia** (10–13)		34,942	81–75	5–5
157	September 27	Reds	12–5	**Wainwright** (13–9)	Stephenson (2–3)		34,286	82–75	6–4
158	September 28	Reds	1–2	DeSclafani (9–5)	**Leake** (9–12)	Iglesias (5)	36,275	82–76	5–5
159	September 29	Reds	4–3	**Oh** (6–3)	Wood (6–5)		38,830	83–76	5–5
160	September 30	Pirates	7–0	**Martinez** (16–9)	Glasnow (0–2)		43,070	84–76	5–5

October: 2–0 (1.000) (Home: 2–0; Away: 0–0 )

#	Date	Opponent	Score	Win	Loss	Save	Attendance	Record	Box / L10
161	October 1	Pirates	4–3	**Siegrist** (6–3)	Rivero (1–6)	**Oh** (19)	43,328	85–76	5–5
162	October 2	Pirates	10–4	**Broxton** (4–2)	Nicasio (10–7)		44,615	86–76	6–4

Legend: = Win = Loss = Postponement
Bold = Cardinals player

== Roster ==
2016 St. Louis Cardinals
Roster
Pitchers: 67 Matt Bowman; 30 Jonathan Broxton; 29 Zach Duke; 54 Jaime García; 60 Dean Kiekhefer; 8 Mike Leake; 70 Tyler Lyons; 43 Seth Maness; 18 Carlos Martínez; 59 Mike Mayers; 26 Seung-hwan Oh; 61 Alex Reyes; 44 Trevor Rosenthal; 46 Kevin Siegrist; 63 Miguel Socolovich; 64 Sam Tuivailala; 52 Michael Wacha; 50 Adam Wainwright; 62 Luke Weaver; 38 Jerome Williams	Catchers: 59 Eric Fryer; 71 Carson Kelly; 4 Yadier Molina; 33 Brayan Peña; 68 Alberto Rosario; Infielders: 32 Matt Adams; 13 Matt Carpenter; 36 Aledmys Díaz; 35 Greg Garcia; 3 Jedd Gyorko; 27 Jhonny Peralta; 19 Rubén Tejada; 16 Kolten Wong	Outfielders: 15 Randal Grichuk; 41 Jeremy Hazelbaker; 7 Matt Holliday; 58 José Martinez; 37 Brandon Moss; 28 Tommy Pham; 55 Stephen Piscotty; Other batters: 19 Michael McKenry	Manager: 22 Mike Matheny; Coaches: 25 David Bell (bench); 49 Blaise Ilsley (bullpen); 34 Derek Lilliquist (pitching); 47 John Mabry (hitting); 23 Bill Mueller (first base); 48 Derrick May (assistant hitting); 77 Chris Maloney (third base); 39 Jamie Pogue (bullpen catcher); 76 Kleininger Teran (bullpen catcher)

=== Injury report ===
Injury Report

Name	Duration of Injury on DL		Injury type	Disabled list	Games missed	Ref.
Name	Start	End	Injury type	Disabled list	Games missed	Ref.
Lance Lynn	November 9, 2015	2017	Tommy John surgery (Nov. 10, 2015)	April 2 (60-day)	162	
Tyler Waldron	February 21, 2016	Indefinite	Right shoulder impingement	TBD	---	
Jhonny Peralta	March 7, 2016	June 7	Torn ulnar collateral ligament of left thumb	March 25 (retroactive, April 2)	57	
Mitch Harris	March 25, 2016	2017	Right elbow compression pain Had Tommy John-like surgery (6/13-6/17)	March 25 (retroactive, April 2); Trans. to 60-day DL, May 25	162 in 2016	
Jordan Walden	April 2, 2016	Indefinite	Grade 2 strain, right Latissimus dorsi muscle	March 31 (retroactive, April 2); Trans. to 60-day DL, July 25	162	
Brayan Pena	April 2, 2016	June 28	Left knee cartilage removal	April 1 (retroactive, April 2)	75	
Tommy Pham	April 4, 2016	May 17	Left oblique, strain	April 4	37	
Marco Gonzales	April 13, 2016	2017 (12–15 mo.)	Left elbow ligament with Tommy John surgery	TBD	155 in 2016	
Seth Maness	May 14, 2016	June 19	Right elbow inflammation	May 13 (retroactive, May 14)	31	
Kevin Siegrist	July 1, 2016	July 15	Mononucleosis	July 1 (retroactive, June 30)	10	
Brandon Moss	July 5, 2016	August 2	Sprained left ankle	July 5 (retroactive, July 4)	25	
Brayan Pena	July 6, 2016	September 4	Left knee inflammation	July 6 (retroactive, July 5); Trans. to 60-day DL, Aug 9	51	
Matt Carpenter	July 7, 2016	August 5	Right oblique muscle strain	July 7 (retroactive, July 6)	24	
Jhonny Peralta	July 19, 2016	August 2	Strained ulnar collateral ligament of left thumb	July 19 (retroactive, July 18)	15	
Trevor Rosenthal	July 26, 2016	September 15	Right shoulder inflammation in rotator cuff	July 26 (retroactive, July 25)	47	
Aledmys Diaz	August 2, 2016	September 11	Hairline fracture of right thumb	August 2 (retroactive, August 1)	36	
Tyler Lyons	August 3, 2016	2017	Stress reaction of right knee	August 3 (retroactive, July 31); Trans. to 60-day DL, Aug 12	57	
Michael Wacha	August 9, 2016	September 14	Right shoulder inflammation	August 9 (retroactive, August 8)	32	
Matt Adams	August 11, 2016	September 2	Right shoulder inflammation	Aug. 11 (retroactive, Aug. 10)	18	
Matt Holliday	August 13, 2016	September 30	Right thumb fracture	Aug. 13 (retroactive, Aug. 11)	44	
Seth Maness	August 16, 2016	2017 (6+ mo.)	UCL surgery on Right elbow	Aug. 16 (retroactive, Aug. 14); Trans. to 60-day DL, Sep 4	44 in 2016	
Mike Leake	August 29, 2016	September 7	Shingles	Aug. 29 (retroactive, Aug. 22)	14	

== Statistics ==
=== Batting statistics ===
(through October 3)

Legend
Pos	Position	R	Runs scored	HR	Home runs	SB	Stolen bases	AVG	Batting average
G	Games played	H	Hits	RBI	Runs batted in	CS	Caught stealing	OBP	On-base percentage
PA	Plate appearances	2B	Doubles	BB	Bases on balls	HBP	HBP	SLG	Slugging percentage
AB	At bats	3B	Triples	SO	Strikeouts	GIDP	GIDP	OPS	On-base plus slugging percentage

	Key to symbols and categories
**Names**	* – left-handed batter or pitcher; # – switch hitter; Bold: active and on both 25-man roster and 40-man roster; ''₤ – on 40-man roster but not 25-man roster; Italics: on 10-day disabled list (DL) or 60-day DL (§)
**Starting lineup** / **rotation**	Table half above first double line: Appeared in most games at that position or top five pitchers in starts Below double line: Ranked by AB regardless of position for position players / Role, then IP for pitchers
**Statistics**	: Team leader; Bold: Major League Baseball (MLB) leader or tied for lead; **Bold** (non-italicized): American (AL) or National League (NL) leader or tied for lead; ^{†} – top-ten in AL or NL

Regular season
Pos	Player	G	AB	R	H	2B	3B	HR	RBI	BB	SO	SB	CS	HBP	GIDP	AVG	OBP	SLG	OPS
1B	M. Adams	118	297	37	74	18	0	16	54	25	81	0	1	2	5	0.249	0.309	0.471	0.780
3B	M. Carpenter	129	473	81	128	36	6	21	68	81	108	0	4	5	4	0.271	0.380	0.505	0.885
SS	A. Diaz	111	404	71	121	28	3	17	65	41	60	4	4	7	10	0.300	0.369	0.510	0.879
C	E. Fryer	24	38	7	14	2	0	0	5	3	7	0	1	0	0	0.368	0.415	0.421	0.836
IF	G. Garcia	99	214	33	59	11	0	3	17	38	50	1	1	4	3	0.276	0.393	0.369	0.762
CF	R. Grichuk	132	446	66	107	29	3	24	68	28	141	5	4	3	9	0.240	0.289	0.480	0.769
2B	J. Gyorko	128	400	58	97	9	1	30	59	37	96	0	0	0	11	0.243	0.306	0.495	0.801
OF	J. Hazelbaker	114	200	35	47	7	3	12	28	18	64	5	2	0	1	0.235	0.295	0.480	0.775
LF	M. Holliday	110	382	48	94	20	1	20	62	35	71	0	0	8	9	0.246	0.322	0.461	0.782
C	C. Kelly	10	13	1	2	1	0	0	1	0	2	0	0	1	0	0.154	0.214	0.231	0.445
C	M. McKenry	3	1	0	0	0	0	0	0	0	1	0	0	0	0	0.000	0.000	0.000	0.000
UT	J. Martínez	12	16	4	7	1	0	0	1	2	1	0	0	0	0	0.438	0.500	0.500	1.000
C	Y. Molina	147	534	56	164	38	1	8	58	39	63	3	2	6	22	0.307	0.360	0.427	0.787
1B	B. Moss	128	413	66	93	19	2	28	67	39	141	1	0	7	8	0.225	0.300	0.484	0.784
C	B. Peña	9	13	0	2	1	0	0	0	1	2	0	0	0	0	0.154	0.214	0.231	0.445
3B	J. Peralta	82	289	37	75	17	1	8	29	20	56	0	0	1	5	0.260	0.307	0.408	0.715
CF	T. Pham	78	159	26	36	7	0	9	17	20	71	2	2	3	3	0.226	0.324	0.440	0.764
RF	S. Piscotty	153	582	86	159	35	3	22	85	51	133	7	5	12	14	0.273	0.343	0.457	0.800
C	A. Rosario	20	38	3	7	2	0	0	2	2	5	0	0	0	2	0.184	0.225	0.237	0.462
2B	K. Wong	121	313	39	75	7	7	5	23	34	52	7	0	9	3	0.240	0.327	0.355	0.682
IF	R. Tejada	23	34	6	6	2	0	0	3	2	8	0	0	1	1	0.176	0.225	0.235	0.460
Non-pitcher totals			5259	760	1367	290	31	223	712	516	1213	35	26	69	110	0.260	0.332	0.454	0.786
Pitcher totals			289	19	48	9	1	2	33	10	105	0	0	1	7	0.166	0.195	0.225	0.420
TEAM TOTALS (10/3)		162	5548	779	1415	299	32	225	745	526	1318	35	26	70	117	0.255	0.325	0.442	0.767

=== Pitching statistics ===
Legend
Role	Pitcher	G	Games pitched	ShO	Shutouts	HR	Home runs allowed	H/9	Hits per nine innings pitched
W	Wins	GS	Games started	SV	Save	BB	Bases on balls allowed	BB/9	Bases on balls per 9 innings pitched
L	Losses	GF	Games finished	IP	Innings pitched	SO	Strikeouts	SO/9	Strikeouts per 9 innings pitched
ERA	Earned run average	CG	Complete game	H	Hits allowed	WHIP	Walks plus hits per inning pitched	BFP	Batters faced by pitcher

	Key to symbols and categories
**Names**	* – left-handed batter or pitcher; # – switch hitter; Bold: active and on both 25-man roster and 40-man roster; ''₤ – on 40-man roster but not 25-man roster; Italics: on 10-day disabled list (DL) or 60-day DL (§)
**Starting lineup** / **rotation**	Table half above first double line: Appeared in most games at that position or top five pitchers in starts Below double line: Ranked by AB regardless of position for position players / Role, then IP for pitchers
**Statistics**	: Team leader; Bold: Major League Baseball (MLB) leader or tied for lead; **Bold** (non-italicized): American (AL) or National League (NL) leader or tied for lead; ^{†} – top-ten in AL or NL

Regular Season (through October 3)
Name	W	L	W%	ERA	G	GS	GF	CG	ShO	SV	IP	H	HR	BB	SO	WHIP	H/9	BB/9	SO/9	BFP
J. Garcia SP	10	13	.435	4.67	32	30	0	1	1	0	171.2	179	26	57	150	1.38	9.4	3.0	7.9	741
M. Leake SP	9	12	.429	4.69	30	30	0	0	0	0	176.2	203	20	30	125	1.32	10.3	1.5	6.4	757
C. Martinez SP	16	9	.640	3.04	31	31	0	0	0	0	195.1	169	15	70	174	1.22	7.8	3.2	8.0	809
M. Wacha SP	7	7	.500	5.09	27	24	1	0	0	0	138.0	159	15	45	114	1.48	10.4	2.9	7.4	606
A. Wainwright SP	13	9	.591	4.62	33	33	0	1	1	0	198.2	220	22	59	161	1.40	10.0	2.7	7.3	847
A. Reyes	4	1	.800	1.57	12	5	3	0	0	1	46.0	33	1	23	52	1.22	6.5	4.5	10.2	189
L. Weaver	1	4	.200	5.70	9	8	0	0	0	0	36.1	46	7	12	45	1.60	11.4	3.0	11.1	167
M. Mayers	1	1	.500	27.00	4	1	0	0	0	0	5.1	16	3	3	2	3.56	27.0	5.1	3.4	35
S. Oh CL	6	3	.667	1.92	76	0	35	0	0	19	79.2	55	5	18	103	0.92	6.2	2.0	11.6	313
M. Bowman RP	2	5	.286	3.46	59	0	12	0	0	0	67.2	59	4	20	52	1.17	7.8	2.7	6.9	281
K. Siegrist RP	6	3	.667	2.77	67	0	11	0	0	3	61.2	42	10	26	66	1.10	6.1	3.8	9.6	248
J. Broxton RP	4	2	.667	4.30	66	0	14	0	0	0	60.2	52	7	24	57	1.25	7.7	3.6	8.5	259
T. Rosenthal RP	2	4	.333	4.46	45	0	27	0	0	14	40.1	48	3	29	56	1.91	10.7	6.5	12.5	197
T. Lyons	2	0	1.000	3.38	30	0	10	0	0	0	48.0	35	9	14	46	1.02	6.6	2.6	8.6	187
S. Maness	2	2	.500	3.41	29	0	13	0	0	0	31.2	34	2	8	16	1.33	9.7	2.3	4.5	134
Z. Duke	0	1	.000	1.93	28	0	4	0	0	1	23.1	17	0	13	26	1.29	6.6	5.0	10.0	99
D. Kiekhefer	0	0	–	5.32	26	0	10	0	0	0	22.0	24	2	7	14	1.41	9.8	2.9	5.7	98
M. Socolovich	1	0	1.000	2.00	15	0	6	0	0	0	18.0	5	2	5	16	0.56	2.5	2.5	8.0	64
J. Williams	0	0	–	5.71	11	0	9	0	0	0	17.1	22	4	6	8	1.62	11.4	3.1	4.2	81
S. Tuivailala	0	0	–	6.00	12	0	4	0	0	0	9.0	12	0	6	7	2.00	12.0	6.0	7.0	47
R. Tejada	0	0	–	18.00	1	0	1	0	0	0	1.0	2	2	0	0	2.00	18.0	0.0	0.0	5
TEAM Totals	86	76	.531	4.08	162	162	160	2	2	38	1448.1	1432	159	475	1290	1.32	8.9	3.0	8.0	6164

== Records, awards, and milestones ==
=== Records ===
Records
Performer	Organization or venue	Accomplishment	Date	Ref.
St. Louis Cardinals	Major League Baseball	Pinch hit home runs in one game (3)	April 8	
St. Louis Cardinals	Busch Stadium	Home runs in one game (6)	April 15	
Aledmys Díaz	Major League Baseball	First player with .500 AVG after first 50 MLB at-bats	April 27	
Matt Carpenter	St. Louis Cardinals	Runs batted in in one game as leadoff hitter (6, tied)	May 19	
St. Louis Cardinals	St. Louis Cardinals	Most extra base hits; HRs in a game (13, tied; 6 tied)	June 26	
Brandon Moss	Busch Stadium	Longest home run, 477 feet (145 m)	June 30	
St. Louis Cardinals	Major League Baseball	Pinch hit home runs in one season (15)	September 6	

=== Awards ===
Major League Baseball All-Star Game selections

Cardinals representing the National League
Player	Pos.	Sel.	Notes	Ref.
Matt Carpenter	3B	3	Selected as reserve by NL Mgr. Terry Collins, did not play due to injury	
Aledmys Díaz	SS	1	Selected as reserve by Collins to replace Carpenter	

Other awards

Regular season awards
Performer	Date	Awards	Ref.
Matt Carpenter	May 30 – June 5	National League Player of the Week	

=== Milestones ===
Regular season milestones
Performer	Accomplishment	Date	Ref.
Aledmys Díaz	1st Game, AB, Hit	April 5	
Matt Bowman	1st Game, SO	April 6	
Trevor Rosenthal	100th Save	April 20	
Aledmys Díaz	1st 5-hit game	April 23	
Yadier Molina	1,500th game	May 14	
Dean Kiekhefer	1st Game, SO	May 14	
Randal Grichuk	1st walk-off home run	May 23	
Stephen Piscotty	1st Grand slam	May 27	
Mike Matheny	400th win as manager	May 27	
Matt Bowman	1st Win	June 8	
Matt Holliday	1,000th hit with Cardinals	May 31	
Yadier Molina	1,500th hit	July 2	
Seung-hwan Oh	1st Save	July 2	
Alberto Rosario	1st Game, AB, Hit, RBI	July 9	
Mike Mayers	1st game, SO	July 24	
Alex Reyes	1st game, SO	August 9	
Luke Weaver	1st Game, SO	August 13	
Randal Grichuk	1st grand slam	August 13	
Alex Reyes	1st win (reliever)	August 13	
Alex Reyes	1st save	August 19	
Luke Weaver	1st Start and Win	August 26	
Alex Reyes	1st start	August 27	
Carson Kelly	1st game, hit, assist	September 5	
José Martínez	1st game	September 6	
Mike Mayers	1st win (reliever)	September 6	
José Martínez	1st hit	September 8	
Carson Kelly	1st start as catcher	September 11	
Aledmys Díaz	1st grand slam	September 27	

== Executives and club officials ==
Executive officers

- Chairman and chief executive officer: William DeWitt, Jr.
- President: William DeWitt III
- Senior vice president and general counsel: Mike Whittle
- Vice president of business development: Dan Good

Baseball operations department

- Senior vice president of baseball operations and general manager (GM): John Mozeliak
- Assistant general manager: Mike Girsch
- Special assistants to the GM: Ryan Franklin, Mike Jorgensen, Cal Eldred, Willie McGee, and Red Schoendienst
- Director of player development: Gary LaRocque
- Director of player personnel: Matt Slater
- Director of Major League administration: Judy Carpenter-Barada
- Director of baseball administration: John Vuch
- Baseball operations coordinator for player development: Tony Ferreira
- Director of scouting: Randy Flores
- Director of international operations: Moisés Rodríguez
- Assistant director of international scouting: Luís Morales
- Manager for baseball information: Jeremy Cohen
- Baseball development analysts: Matt Bayer, Kevin Seats, Dane Sorensen
- Baseball developers: Pat Casanta, Brian Seyfert
- Additional coaching staff
  - Senior medical advisor: Barry Weinberg
  - Head athletic trainer: Adam Olsen
  - Strength/conditioning coach: Pete Prinzi
  - Equipment manager: Rip Rowan
  - Traveling secretary: C. J. Cherre

Communications department

- Vice president: Ron Watermon
- Director: Brian Bartow

Cardinals Care and community relations department

- Vice president for community relations and executive director for Cardinals Care: Michael Hall
- Vice president for event services and merchandising: Vicki Bryant

Finance and administration department

- Senior vice president and chief financial officer: Brad Wood

Operations department

- Vice president: Joe Abernathy

Ticket sales, marketing and corporate sales department

- Senior vice president of sales and marketing: Dan Farrell

== Minor league system and first-year player draft ==
=== Teams ===
Level	Team	League	Division	Manager	W–L/Stats	Standing	Refs
AAA	Memphis Redbirds	Pacific Coast	American–South	Mike Shildt			
AA	Springfield Cardinals	Texas	North	Dann Bilardello			
A+	Palm Beach Cardinals	Florida State	South	Oliver Marmol			
A	Peoria Chiefs	Midwest	Western	Joe Kruzel			
A (SS)	State College Spikes	New York–Penn	Pinckney	Johnny Rodriguez		League champions	
Rookie	Johnson City Cardinals	Appalachian	West	Chris Swauger		League champions	
Rookie	GCL Cardinals	Gulf Coast	East	Steve Turco		League champions	
Rookie	DSL Cardinals	Dominican Summer	Boca Chica North	Fray Peniche			

=== Overview ===
After testing positive for marijuana, Major League Baseball suspended pitching prospect Alex Reyes on November 9, 2015, for 50 games including the remainder of his Arizona Fall League (AFL) play and start of the 2016 season. A total of eight players were selected from the Cardinals system in the rule 5 draft on December 10: Luis Perdomo (RHP to Colorado), Fernando Baez (RHP to Tampa Bay), Juan Caballero (RHP to Miami), Cory Jones (RHP to Baltimore), Mike O'Neill (OF to Cubs), Jhonny Polanco (RHP to Boston), Robelys Reyes (SS to Arizona) and Kender Villegas (RHP to Milwaukee). The Cardinals selected Matthew Bowman, a right-handed pitcher, from the New York Mets.

Entering the 2016 season, MLB.com ranked Reyes as the tenth-best prospect in all the minor leagues, and Baseball Prospectus at number 13. The Cardinals sold Carlos Peguero's contract to the Tohoku Rakuten Golden Eagles of Nippon Professional Baseball (NPB) on July 8. In their updated prospect rankings, Baseball America placed Reyes second of all prospects in baseball in their July 8 update. Also making the top 100 were Luke Weaver (75), Jack Flaherty (88), and Harrison Bader (89).

In 2016, the Cardinals signed three Cuban players as free agents: outfielders Randy Arozarena ($1.25 million on July 27) and Jonatan Machado, and right-handed pitcher Johan Oviedo.

=== Awards ===
Cardinals system top-10 prospects rankings
Rk.	Baseball America (preseason)	MLB.com	Baseball America (midseason Top 100)
1	Alex Reyes (RHP) − 13	Alex Reyes (RHP) − 9	Alex Reyes (RHP) − 2
2	Tim Cooney (LHP)	Jack Flaherty (RHP)	Luke Weaver (RHP) − 75
3	Jack Flaherty (RHP)	Luke Weaver (RHP)	Jack Flaherty (RHP) − 88
4	Luke Weaver (RHP)	Magneuris Sierra (OF)	Harrison Bader (OF) − 89
5	Marco Gonzales (LHP)	Edmundo Sosa (SS)	
6	Magneuris Sierra (OF)	Nick Plummer (OF)	
7	Edmundo Sosa (SS)	Marco Gonzales (LHP)	
8	Nick Plummer (OF)	Tim Cooney (LHP)	
9	Junior Fernández (RHP)	Charlie Tilson (OF)	
10	Carson Kelly (C)	Harrison Bader (OF)	

All-Star Futures Game selections
Pos	Name	Team	Minor League assignment	Ref
OF	Harrison Bader	United States	Memphis Redbirds (AAA)	
C	Carson Kelly	United States	Springfield Cardinals (AA)	
RHP	Alex Reyes	World	Memphis Redbirds (AAA)	

=== Major League Baseball draft ===
The draft was held on June 9–11, 2016, at Secaucus, New Jersey. Day one of the MLB Draft included the first 77 overall selections. The Cardinals, in addition to their trio of first-round picks, will also make the 70th overall selection that day. Because they posted MLB's best record in 2015, the Cardinals receive the last pick in each subsequent round. Rounds 3–10 will be held on June 10, followed by rounds 11–40 a day later. The Cardinals have not yet announced who they will send to Secaucus to serve as their on-site representative for the event's first day.

Because Heyward and Lackey both received qualifying offers and signed with the Chicago Cubs as free agents prior to the 2016 season, the Cardinals were allotted a total of three selections within the first 40 picks.

Former Cardinals' relief pitcher Randy Flores (2004–08) is in his first year as scouting director for any team, and is the fourth scouting director for the club since 2011. Instead of an analytical background as were his three predecessors, he brings a unique perspective as a former player.

The organization has been assigned a pool of $9.1433 million to use when signing players taken in the first 10 rounds. In addition, any bonus greater than $100,000 for a player taken after the 10th round will apply toward the bonus-pool total. Any team going up to 5 percent over its allotted pool will be taxed at a 75 percent rate on the overage. Overspending beyond 5 percent would cost the team future Draft picks, which the Cardinals are not expected to do. The signing deadline is July 15.

According to one MLB.com columnist, the Cardinals had the second-best draft of the 30 teams, with only the first-pick team in all rounds, Philadelphia Phillies, getting more raw talent and expected signable draftees.

With their 42 picks, the Cardinals drafted 16 RHP's, 10 outfielders, 4 LHP's, 3 SS's, 3 C's, 3 2B-men, 2 3B-men, and 1 1B-man.

Their first-round (compensatory A round) pick, Dylan Carlson rescinded his college commitment to California State University-Fullerton on June 14, and agreed to a signing bonus of $1.35 mil., which is $550,500 under the slot value for the 33rd draft pick.

Three more draft picks came to terms on June 16, including fifth-rounder Walker Robbins, who signed for $134,400 over the $315,600 slot value. Three undrafted free agents were also added.

The Cardinals signed their No. 1 draft pick, Delvin Pérez, 17, on June 17, for the full slot value of $2,222,500. He is 6' 2", 180 lbs.

On June 18, the team announced the signing of their last remaining unsigned first-round pick, RHP Dakota Hudson. He signed for $2 mil., which was $122,000 over the slot value.

As of June 23, the Cardinals have signed 32 of their 42 draft picks including all of rounds one-to-10, with 10 unsigned.

With the signing of 2B-man J.R. Davis on July 2, the Cardinals have signed 33 draft picks, leaving nine unsigned.

2B-man Jonathan Murders signed on July 11, giving the team 34 signed of 42 draft picks, leaving eight unsigned.

List of Draft Selections

2016 St. Louis Cardinals complete draft list

Round	Pick	Name, Age	Pos / Bats	School (State)	Bonus amount	Date sgnd.	Notes	Refs
1	23	Delvin Pérez, 17	SS / R	Colegio Individualizado PJ Education Sch. (PR); International Baseball Academy (PR)	$2.22 mil.	June 17	Failed PED test, May Preview	
CB A	33	Dylan Carlson, 17	OF/1B(swh)	Elk Grove HS (CA)	$1.35 mil.	June 15	.407; 9 HR; 40 RBI in 36 G	
CB A	34	Dakota Hudson, 21	RHP / R	Mississippi State University (MS)	$2.0 mil.	June 18	2.55 ERA, 17 starts; 115 strikeouts, 113 IP	
2	70	Connor Jones, 21	RHP / R	University of Virginia (VA)	$1.1 mil.	June 20	11–1, 2.34 ERA; 72 strikeouts in 103.2 IP	
3	106	Zac Gallen, 20	RHP / R	University of North Carolina (NC)	$563,100	June 20		
4	136	Jeremy Martinez, 21	C / R	University of Southern California (CA)	$600,000	June 15		
5	166	Walker Robbins, 18	OF / LHP/L	George County HS (MS)	$450,000	Jun 16	.477; 3 HR; 16 RBI; 115 PA;8–2, 0.67 ERA	
6	196	Tommy Edman, 21	SS (swh)	Stanford (CA)	$236,400	June 15		
7	226	Andrew Knizner, 21	C / 3B/ R	North Carolina State (NC)	$185,300	June 18		
8	256	Sam Tewes, 21	RHP / R	Wichita State (KS)	$100,000	June 15	Tommy John surgery on March 31	
9	286	Matt Fiedler, 21	OF /RHP/R	Minnesota (MN)	$100,000	June 15		
10	316	Danny Hudzina, 22	3B / R	Western Kentucky University (KY)	$3,000	June 15		
11	346	John Kilichowski, 22	LHP / L	Vanderbilt (TN)	$200,000	June 18		
12	376	Brady Whalen, 18	SS (swh)	Union HS (WA)	$475,000	June 23		
13	406	Shane Billings, 21	CF / R	Wingate University (NC)		June 15	.444;.639 SLG;30 SB;15K's;216 AB	
14	436	Vincent Jackson, 22	OF / L	Tennessee (TN)		June 15		
15	466	J.R. Davis, 21	2B / R	Oklahoma State University (OK)		July 2		
16	496	Tyler Lancaster, 21	C / L	Spartanburg Methodist (Junior) College(SC)		June 15	9 HR	
17	526	Matt Ellis, 22	RHP / R	University of California-Riverside (CA)				
18	556	Austin Sexton, 21	RHP / R	Mississippi State University (MS)		June 18		
19	586	Daniel Castano, 21	LHP / L	Baylor University (TX)	$130,000	June 15		
20	616	Stefan Trosclair, 21	1B / R	University of Louisiana-Lafayette (LA)		June 16	.277; 7 HR; 39 RBI	
21	646	Cade Cabbiness, 18	OF / L	Bixby HS (OK)				
22	676	Mick Fennell, 22	CF / L	California University of Pennsylvania (PA)		June 15	Active leader, (26) Triples in NCAA.	
23	706	John Crowe, 23	OF / L	Francis Marion University (SC)		6/18/17	104 Total bases; 33 W; 27 strikeouts	
24	736	Anthony Ciavarella,22	LHP / L	Monmouth University (NJ)		June 15		
25	766	Spencer Trayner, 21	RHP / R	University of North Carolina (NC)		June 15		
26	796	Eric Carter, 23	RHP / R	University of Louisiana-Lafayette (LA)		June 18		
27	826	Michael O'Reilly, 21	RHP / R	Flagler College (FL)		June 15		
28	856	Pat Krall, 21	LHP / L	Clemson University (SC)				
29	886	Noel Gonzalez, 22	RHP / R	Lewis–Clark State (ID)		June 16	2–0, 0.86 ERA; 8 SVs; 21 IP in 15 G	
30	916	Josh Burgmann, 18	RHP / R	Vauxhall HS (Nanaimo, B.C. CAN)				
31	946	Jonathan Murders, 18	2B / L	Bolivar HS (Bolivar, MO)	$200,000	July 11		
32	976	Leland Tilley, 24	RHP / R	Bellevue University (NE)		June 15		
33	1,006	Caleb Lopes, 20	2B / R	University of West Georgia		June 15	9 HR; 10 strikeouts in 266 PA	
34	1,036	Jonathan Mulford, 21	RHP / R	Adelphi University (NY)		June 15		
35	1,066	Jackson Lamb, 21	RHP / R	University of Michigan (MI)				
36	1,096	Robbie Gordon, 23	RHP / R	Maryville University (MO)		June 18	St. Louis native P perfect gm.	
37	1,126	Andrew Young, 22	3B / R	Indiana State University (IN)		June 15		
38	1,156	Robert Calvano, 23	RHP / R	University of Nebraska-Omaha (NE)		June 15		
39	1,186	Aaron Bond, 19	OF / L	San Jacinto (Junior) College-North (TX)				
40	1,216	Jeremy Ydens, 18	CF / R	St. Francis HS (CA)				

=== Free agents signed ===
Non-drafted free agents signed

Name, age	Position / Bats	School (state)	Bonus amount	Date signed	Notes	Refs
Daniel Bard, 30	RHP / R	University of North Carolina (NC)		June 22	6' 4", 215 lbs., RELEASED by the Cardinals on May 23, 2017	
Matt Davis, 21	SS / R	Cumberland Valley High School (PA)		July 14	5' 10", 175 lbs.	
Diomedes Del Rio, 18	OF / L	n/a		July 2	5' 10", 160 lbs.	
Yariel Gonzalez, 22	2B / S	University of Science & Arts (OK)		June 16	6' 1, 190 lbs.	
Ivan Herrera, 16	C / R	n/a		July 7	6' 0", 180 lbs.	
Jonathan Machado, 17	CF / L	n/a	$2.35 mil.	July 15	5' 9", 155 lbs.	
Levi MaVorhies, 21	RHP / R	Kansas State University (KS)		June 17	6' 2", 215 lbs.	
Efren Navarro, 30	1B / L	University of Nevada-Las Vegas (NV)		July 7	.246; 1 HR; 20 RBI; 256 AB (L.A. Angels)	
Erik Pena, 16	SS / S	n/a		July 12	5' 8", 140 lbs.	
Anthony Shew, 22	RHP / R	University of San Francisco		June 22	6' 2", 191 lbs.	
Keaton Siomkin, 24	RHP / R	University of California-Berkeley (CA)		June 17	3.22 ERA in 26 G	
Emmanel Solano, 17	RHP / R	n/a		July 2	6' 1", 160 lbs.	
Carlos Soto, 17	C / L	n/a		July 2	6' 2", 220 lbs.	
Colton Thomson, 23	LHP / L	University of North Carolina (NC)		June 23	8–2, 3.61 ERA in 15 starts	
Ross Vance, 24	LHP / L	West Virginia University (WV)		June 17	7–2, 4.91 ERA in 13 starts	
