= Alberto Rosario =

Dominican baseball player (born 1987)

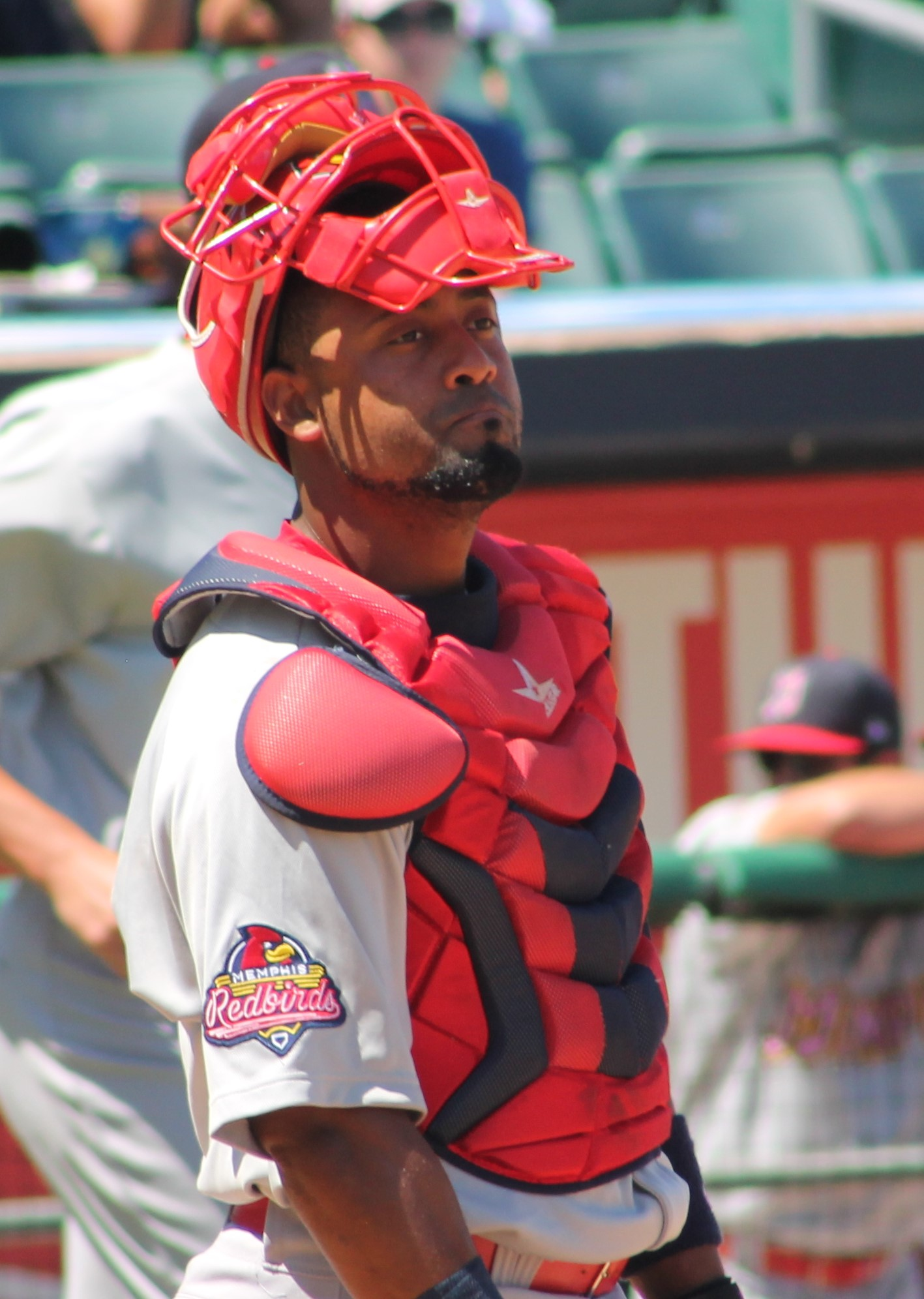
- Rosario with the Memphis Redbirds in 2017
- Catcher
- Born: January 10, 1987 (age 39); Bonao, Monseñor Nouel Province
- Batted: Right Threw: Right

MLB debut
- July 9, 2016, for the St. Louis Cardinals

Last MLB appearance
- October 1, 2017, for the St. Louis Cardinals

MLB statistics
- Batting average: .171
- Home runs: 0
- Runs batted in: 2
- Stats at Baseball Reference

Teams
- St. Louis Cardinals (2016–2017)

Alberto Rosario (born January 10, 1987) is a Dominican former professional baseball catcher. He played in Major League Baseball (MLB) for the St. Louis Cardinals.

== Career ==
=== St. Louis Cardinals ===
Rosario began his professional career with the Los Angeles Angels of Anaheim organization in 2005. The St. Louis Cardinals promoted Rosario to the major leagues on July 6, 2016. He played 11 seasons in Minor League Baseball before making his major league debut July 9, 2016, against the Milwaukee Brewers. He singled and batted in a run in his first MLB at-bat in an 8−1 win. He elected free agency on November 6, 2017.

=== Arizona Diamondbacks ===
On January 5, 2018, Rosario signed a minor league contract with the Arizona Diamondbacks that includes a non-roster invitation to spring training. In 51 games split between the Double–A Jackson Generals and Triple–A Reno Aces, he hit a cumulative .253/.288/.313 with two home runs and 19 RBI. Rosario elected free agency following the season on November 2.

On January 9, 2019, Rosario re-signed with the Diamondbacks on a minor league contract. In 42 games for Triple–A Reno, he batted .250/.325/.307 with one home run and 11 RBI. Rosario elected free agency following the season on November 4.

On January 10, 2020, Rosario again re-signed with the Diamondbacks on a minor league contract. On May 22, Rosario was released by the Diamondbacks organization, however, he re–signed with the club on July 27. Rosario did not play in a game for the team due to the cancellation of the minor league season because of the COVID-19 pandemic. He elected free agency following the season on November 2.

== See also ==
- List of Major League Baseball players from the Dominican Republic
