= Delvin Pérez =

Puerto Rican baseball player (born 1998)

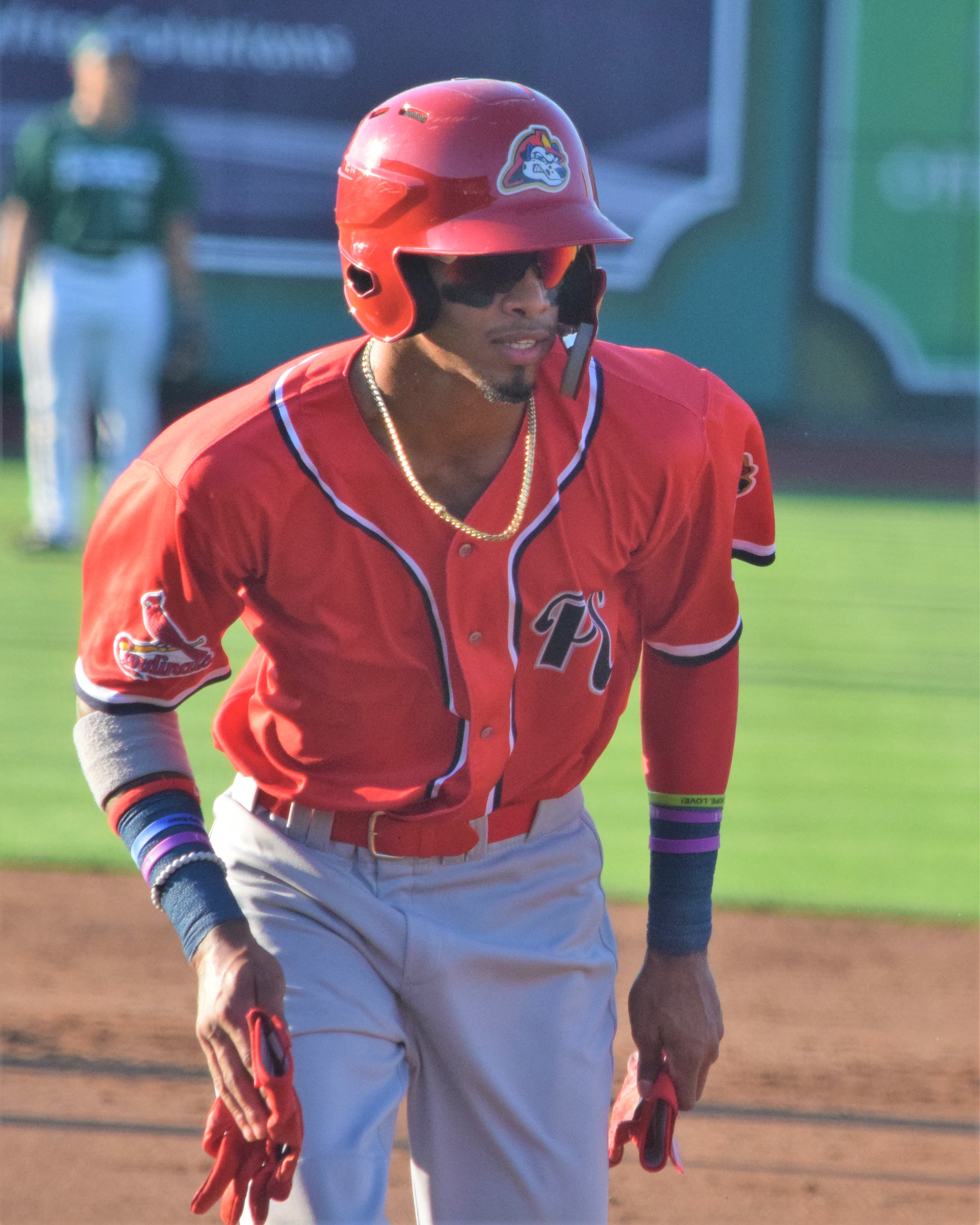
- Pérez in 2019 with the Peoria Chiefs

Milwaukee Milkmen – No. 1
- Infielder
- Born: November 24, 1998 (age 27); San Juan, Puerto Rico
- Bats: Right Throws: Right
- Stats at Baseball Reference

Delvin Pérez Dippini (born November 24, 1998) is a Puerto Rican professional baseball infielder for the Milwaukee Milkmen of the American Association of Professional Baseball.

== Amateur career ==
Pérez attended the International Baseball Academy in Puerto Rico. He started playing shortstop at 14–15 years old after starting out as a pitcher. During the fall of 2015 he played in the World Wood Bat Association World Championship in Jupiter, Florida.

Pérez was considered one of the top prospects for the 2016 Major League Baseball draft, being compared to Carlos Correa. Leading up to the draft he received help from former MLB player Carlos Delgado. Prior to the 2016 MLB draft, Pérez won the Most Valuable Player award in the Víctor Pellot Excellence Tournament, guiding his team to the championship by batting .556 (including several extra-base hits) and leading the tournament in RBIs and runs scored before the highest ranked prospects in Puerto Rico.

On the first day of the draft, media reports claimed that Pérez had failed a drug test for performance enhancing drugs (PEDs). His agent, Melvin Román, was vocal in denouncing the news as gossip and insisted that his client had not failed any tests. Pérez was selected 23rd overall in the first round by the St. Louis Cardinals in the draft.

== Professional career ==
=== St. Louis Cardinals ===
After signing, Pérez made his professional debut with the Rookie-level Gulf Coast League Cardinals where he batted .294 with a .745 OPS and 12 stolen bases. In 2017, Pérez began the season with the Johnson City Cardinals of the Rookie-level Appalachian League. However, after slashing only .140/.275/.186 in 13 games, he was demoted back to the Gulf Coast League. He returned to Johnson City in late July. In 34 total games between both clubs, he batted .203 with nine RBIs and five stolen bases. He spent 2018 with the State College Spikes of the Low–A New York–Penn League, batting .213 with one home run, 21 RBIs, and eight stolen bases over 64 games. Pérez spent 2019 with the Peoria Chiefs of the Single–A Midwest League, with whom he was named an All-Star. Over 118 games, he slashed .269/.329/.325 with one home run, thirty RBIs, and 22 stolen bases.

Pérez did not play in a game in 2020 due to the cancellation of the minor league season because of the COVID-19 pandemic. Over the 2020-21 offseason, Pérez gained over twenty pounds and changed his diet, attributing his struggles throughout his professional career to his "skinny" figure. He spent the 2021 season with the Springfield Cardinals of the Double-A Central, slashing .265/.322/.339 with four home runs, 23 RBIs, and 24 stolen bases over 98 games. He returned to Springfield to begin the 2022 season. He elected free agency following the season on November 10, 2022.

=== New York Yankees ===
On December 26, 2022, Pérez signed a minor league deal with the New York Yankees. In 19 games for the Double–A Somerset Patriots, he struggled to a .170/.296/.305 batting line with 2 home runs, 5 RBI, and 9 stolen bases. On July 13, 2023, Pérez was released by the Yankees organization.

=== Milwaukee Milkmen ===
On January 17, 2025, Pérez signed with the Milwaukee Milkmen of the American Association of Professional Baseball. In 91 games he hit .265/.352/.394 with 9 home runs, 31 RBIs and 17 stolen bases.
