= Austin O. Sexton =

American politician (1852–1908)

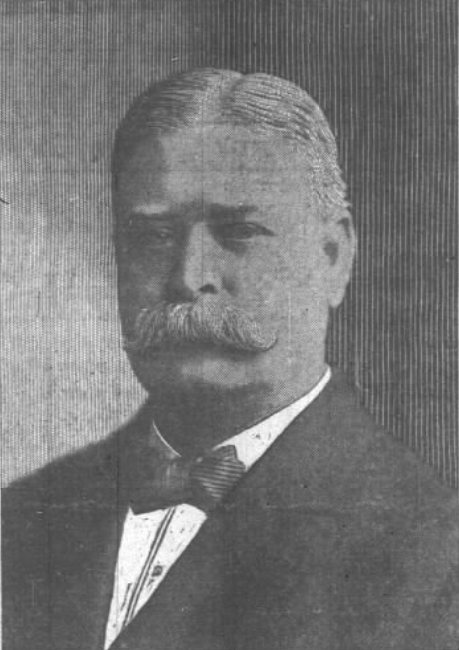

Member of the Illinois House of Representatives from the 6th district
- In office 1876 – 1884

Personal details
- Born: August 15, 1852 Chicago, Illinois
- Died: January 9, 1908 (aged 55) Hammond, Indiana
- Resting place: Calvary Cemetery
- Party: Democratic
- Profession: Attorney

Austin O. Sexton (August 15, 1852 – January 9, 1908) was an American politician from Chicago, Illinois. He born and raised in the city, Sexton studied law and opened a practice in 1876. The same year, he was elected as a Democrat to the Illinois House of Representatives, serving until 1884. He then moved to Lake View, Illinois, and was a prominent citizen there in its last years as an independent city to its first years as a part of Chicago. Upon its annexation, Sexton was elected to serve the area in the Chicago City Council, where he was president pro tempore and helped to oversee preparations for the World's Columbian Exposition. He unsuccessfully ran for a seat on the Supreme Court of Illinois in 1893, then mainly returned to his law practice. Later in his life he was the treasurer of a distillery in Hammond, Indiana.

== Biography ==
Sexton was born in Chicago, Illinois, on August 15, 1852. He attended the Kinzie School, graduating in 1868. Sexton then studied for four years at the Central High School. He decided to pursue a career in law and entered the office of James Ennis in 1874, studying for two years. He was admitted to the bar in 1876 and opened a law practice in Chicago.

In 1876, Sexton was elected as a Democrat to the Illinois House of Representatives. He was re-elected in the next three elections, serving a total of eight years in the 6th district. The Democrats nominated him for Speaker of the House in 1883, but Republican Lorin C. Collins was elected instead.

After his service in the legislature, he moved to Lake View, Illinois. He was elected President of the Lake View Board of Education in 1888, though he only served one year before the suburb was annexed by Chicago. He successfully ran for a seat on the Chicago City Council from the 25th Ward, serving from 1890 to 1895. During this term, he was president pro tempore of the council. This coincided with preparations for the World's Columbian Exposition; since Mayor of Chicago Hempstead Washburne did not attend council meetings, Sexton the most influential council member for fair preparations. During his term, Sexton was also the chairman of the Committee on Judiciary.

In the city council, Sexton became an advocate for sanitation. He unsuccessfully lobbied for the construction of a conduit on Fullerton Avenue, but successfully expanded the Lake View Water Works project, sponsoring legislation that extended its water tunnel 1 mile (1.6 km). Sexton also sponsored a water main project through Lake View. The Democrats nominated Sexton for a position on the Supreme Court of Illinois in 1893, but he was defeated by Jesse J. Phillips. Mayor Carter Harrison, Jr. appointed Sexton to the Chicago Board of Education in 1899, where he served until 1901. He became treasurer of the Hammond Distilling Company in Hammond, Indiana, in 1900.

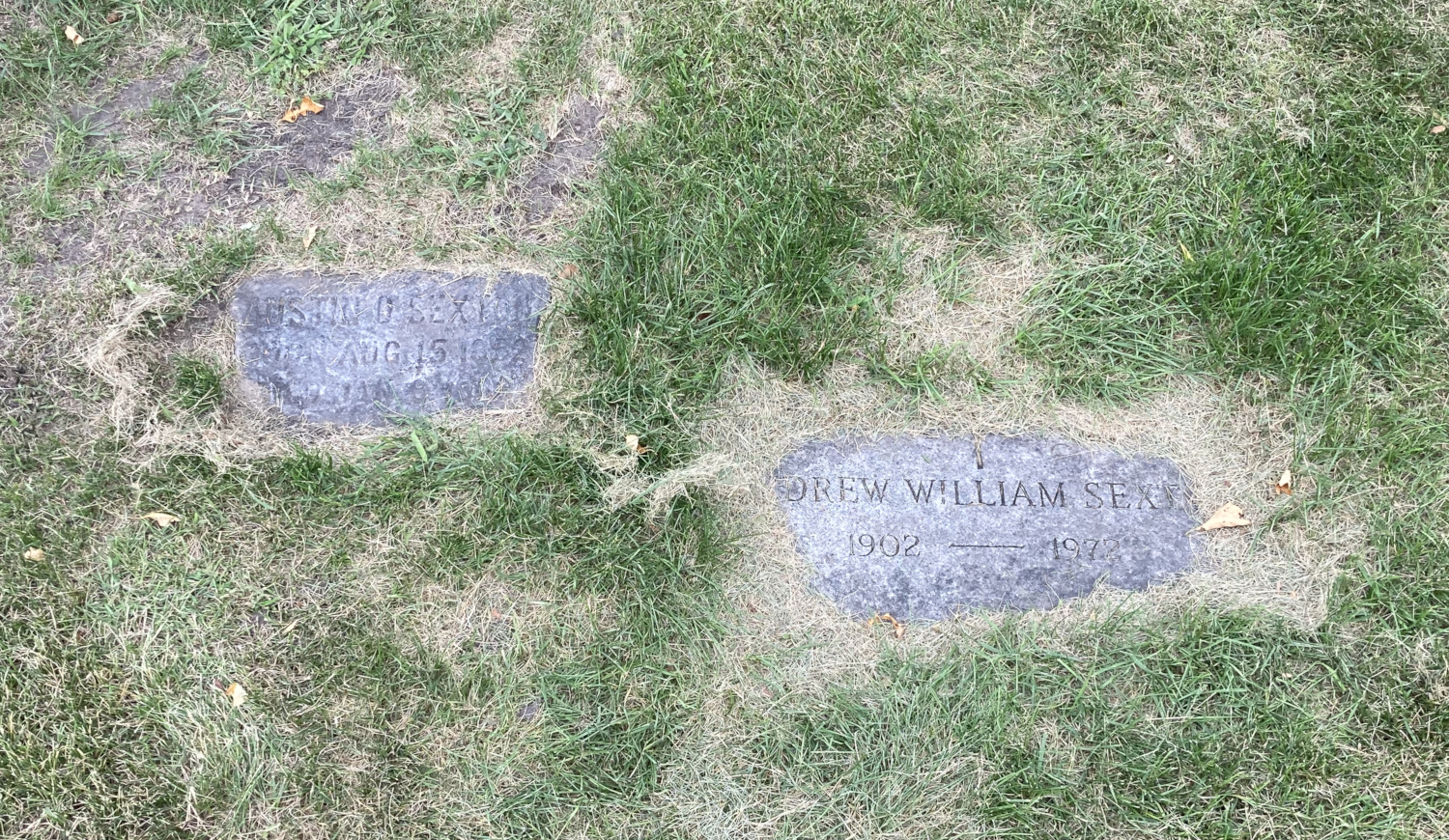
Sexton's grave at Calvary Cemetery

Sexton married Mary I. Lyons in 1874; they had a son (William H.) and three daughters. He largely eschewed social clubs, though he was a member of the Ancient Order of United Workmen. He typically spent his free time at home. Sexton died suddenly at his daughter's house in Hammond on January 9, 1908, and was buried at Calvary Cemetery in Evanston.
