= 2016 Milwaukee Brewers season =

2016 Milwaukee Brewers
- League: National League
- Division: Central
- Ballpark: Miller Park
- City: Milwaukee, Wisconsin
- Record: 73–89 (.451)
- Divisional place: 4th
- Owners: Mark Attanasio
- General managers: David Stearns
- Managers: Craig Counsell
- Television: Fox Sports Wisconsin (Brian Anderson, Bill Schroeder, Craig Coshun, Matt Lepay); WYTU-LD (Spanish-language coverage, Sunday home games; Hector Molina, Kevin Holden)
- Radio: 620 WTMJ (Bob Uecker, Jeff Levering, Lane Grindle); 1510 ESPN Deportes (Spanish-language coverage, select daytime games; Andy Olivares)
- Stats: ESPN.com; Baseball Reference

The 2016 Milwaukee Brewers season was the 47th season for the Brewers in Milwaukee, the 19th in the National League, and 48th overall. They finished the season in fourth place in the National League Central and did not make the playoffs.

As of October 30, 2026, this remains the last time they finished with a losing record in a full 162-game season.

== Regular season ==
=== Season standings ===
==== National League Central ====
NL Central
Team	W	L	Pct.	GB	Home	Road
Chicago Cubs	103	58	.640	—	57‍–‍24	46‍–‍34
St. Louis Cardinals	86	76	.531	17½	38‍–‍43	48‍–‍33
Pittsburgh Pirates	78	83	.484	25	38‍–‍42	40‍–‍41
Milwaukee Brewers	73	89	.451	30½	41‍–‍40	32‍–‍49
Cincinnati Reds	68	94	.420	35½	38‍–‍43	30‍–‍51

==== National League Wild Card ====
Division leaders
Team	W	L	Pct.
Chicago Cubs	103	58	.640
Washington Nationals	95	67	.586
Los Angeles Dodgers	91	71	.562

Wild Card teams (Top 2 teams qualify for postseason)
Team	W	L	Pct.	GB
New York Mets	87	75	.537	—
San Francisco Giants	87	75	.537	—
St. Louis Cardinals	86	76	.531	1
Miami Marlins	79	82	.491	7½
Pittsburgh Pirates	78	83	.484	8½
Colorado Rockies	75	87	.463	12
Milwaukee Brewers	73	89	.451	14
Philadelphia Phillies	71	91	.438	16
Arizona Diamondbacks	69	93	.426	18
Atlanta Braves	68	93	.422	18½
San Diego Padres	68	94	.420	19
Cincinnati Reds	68	94	.420	19

==== Record vs. opponents ====
2016 National League record Source: MLB Standings Grid – 2016
Team	AZ	ATL	CHC	CIN	COL	LAD	MIA	MIL	NYM	PHI	PIT	SD	SF	STL	WSH	AL
Arizona	—	5–2	2–5	3–3	10–9	7–12	2–4	3–4	5–1	4–3	1–5	10–9	6–13	4–3	2–5	5–15
Atlanta	2–5	—	3–3	3–4	1–6	1–5	11–7	2–5	10–9	11–8	3–4	4–2	3–4	2–4	4–15	8–12
Chicago	5–2	3–3	—	15–4	2–4	4–3	4–3	11–8	2–5	5–1	14–4	4–2	4–3	10–9	5–2	15–5
Cincinnati	3–3	4–3	4–15	—	5–2	2–5	3–4	11–8	0–6	4–2	9–10	3–4	3–3	9–10	3–4	5–15
Colorado	9–10	6–1	4–2	2–5	—	7–12	2–5	1–5	6–1	2–5	2–5	10–9	9–10	2–4	4–2	9–11
Los Angeles	12–7	5–1	3–4	5–2	12–7	—	1–6	5–2	4–3	4–2	2–5	11–8	8–11	4–2	5–1	10–10
Miami	4–2	7–11	3–4	4–3	5–2	6–1	—	4–2	7–12	9–10	6–1	3–3	2–4	4–3	9–10	6–14
Milwaukee	4–3	5–2	8–11	8–11	5–1	2–5	2–4	—	2–5	3–4	9–10	3–4	1–5	6–13	4–2	11–9
New York	1–5	9–10	5–2	6–0	1–6	3–4	12–7	5–2	—	12–7	3–3	4–3	4–3	3–3	7–12	12–8
Philadelphia	3–4	8–11	1–5	2–4	5–2	2–4	10–9	4–3	7–12	—	3–4	5–2	3–3	2–5	5–14	11–9
Pittsburgh	5–1	4–3	4–14	10–9	5–2	5–2	1–6	10–9	3–3	4–3	—	3–3	4–3	9–10	2–4	9–11
San Diego	9–10	2–4	2–4	4–3	9–10	8–11	3–3	4–3	3–4	2–5	3–3	—	8–11	1–6	4–3	6–14
San Francisco	13–6	4–3	3–4	3–3	10–9	11–8	4–2	5–1	3–4	3–3	3–4	11–8	—	3–4	3–4	8–12
St. Louis	3–4	4–2	9–10	10–9	4–2	2–4	3–4	13–6	3–3	5–2	10–9	6–1	4–3	—	2–5	8–12
Washington	5–2	15–4	2–5	4–3	2–4	1–5	10–9	2–4	12–7	14–5	4–2	3–4	4–3	5–2	—	12–8

=== Game log ===
2016 game log: 73–89 (Home: 41–40; Away: 32–49)
April: 8–15 (Home: 5–8; Away: 3–7)

#	Date	Opponent	Score	Win	Loss	Save	Attendance	Record	Streak
1	April 4	Giants	3–12	Bumgarner (1–0)	**Peralta** (0–1)	—	44,318	0–1	L1
2	April 5	Giants	1–2	Cueto (1–0)	**Nelson** (0–1)	Casilla (1)	24,123	0–2	L2
3	April 6	Giants	4–3	**Thornburg** (1–0)	López (0–1)	**Jeffress** (1)	20,098	1–2	W1
4	April 8	Astros	6–4	**Anderson** (1–0)	Feldman (0–1)	**Jeffress** (2)	30,100	2–2	W2
5	April 9	Astros	4–6	Fister (1–0)	**Peralta** (0–2)	Gregerson (2)	28,127	2–3	L1
6	April 10	Astros	3–2	**Nelson** (1–1)	Keuchel (1–1)	**Jeffress** (3)	28,441	3–3	W1
7	April 11	@ Cardinals	1–10	Wacha (1–0)	**Jungmann** (0–1)	—	47,608	3–4	L1
8	April 13	@ Cardinals	6–4	**Blazek** (1–0)	Rosenthal (0–1)	**Jeffress** (4)	40,994	4–4	W1
9	April 14	@ Cardinals	0–7	García (1–0)	**Peralta** (0–3)	—	40,168	4–5	L1
10	April 15	@ Pirates	8–4	**Nelson** (2–1)	Locke (0–1)	—	24,280	5–5	W1
11	April 16	@ Pirates	0–5	Niese (2–0)	**Jungmann** (0–2)	—	34,957	5–6	L1
12	April 17	@ Pirates	3–9	Nicasio (2–1)	**Davies** (0–1)	—	31,124	5–7	L2
13	April 18	@ Twins	4–7 (6)	Hughes (1–2)	**Anderson** (1–1)	—	21,078	5–8	L3
14	April 19	@ Twins	6–5	**Thornburg** (2–0)	Jepsen (0–3)	**Jeffress** (5)	17,597	6–8	W1
15	April 20	Twins	10–5	**Nelson** (3–1)	Pressly (1–1)	—	21,087	7–8	W2
16	April 21	Twins	1–8	Nolasco (1–0)	**Jungmann** (0–3)	—	30,107	7–9	L1
17	April 22	Phillies	2–5	Nola (1–2)	**Davies** (0–2)	—	23,439	7–10	L2
18	April 23	Phillies	6–10	Oberholtzer (1–0)	**Anderson** (1–2)	—	34,813	7–11	L3
19	April 24	Phillies	8–5	**Peralta** (1–3)	Eickhoff (1–3)	**Jeffress** (6)	28,131	8–11	W1
20	April 26	@ Cubs	3–4	Warren (2–0)	**Nelson** (3–2)	Rondón (4)	35,861	8–12	L1
—	April 27	@ Cubs		**Postponed (inclement weather)** (Makeup date: August 16)					
21	April 28	@ Cubs	2–7	Arrieta (5–0)	**Jungmann** (0–4)	—	32,734	8–13	L2
22	April 29	Marlins	3–6	Conley (1–1)	**Davies** (0–3)	Ramos (7)	23,215	8–14	L3
23	April 30	Marlins	5–7	Chen (2–1)	**Anderson** (1–3)	Phelps (1)	28,193	8–15	L4

May: 15–14 (Home: 9–7; Away: 6–7)

#	Date	Opponent	Score	Win	Loss	Save	Attendance	Record	Streak
24	May 1	Marlins	14–5	**Peralta** (2–3)	Koehler (2–3)	—	28,181	9–15	W1
25	May 2	Angels	8–5	**Nelson** (4–2)	Weaver (3–1)	—	21,352	10–15	W2
26	May 3	Angels	5–4	**Guerra** (1–0)	Tropeano (1–1)	**Jeffress** (7)	28,180	11–15	W3
27	May 4	Angels	3–7	Salas (2–1)	**Thornburg** (2–1)	Smith (2)	21,907	11–16	L1
28	May 5	@ Reds	5–9	Simón (1–3)	**Anderson** (1–4)	—	13,088	11–17	L2
29	May 6	@ Reds	1–5	Adleman (1–0)	**Cravy** (0–1)	Cingrani (1)	28,249	11–18	L3
30	May 7	@ Reds	13–7 (10)	**Jeffress** (1–0)	Cotham (0–2)	—	27,567	12–18	W1
31	May 8	@ Reds	5–4	**Capuano** (1–0)	Ohlendorf (3–3)	**Jeffress** (8)	22,376	13–18	W2
32	May 9	@ Marlins	1–4	Fernández (4–2)	**Peralta** (2–4)	Morris (1)	16,769	13–19	L1
33	May 10	@ Marlins	10–2	**Davies** (1–3)	Conley (2–2)	—	17,225	14–19	W1
34	May 11	@ Marlins	2–3	Chen (3–1)	**Anderson** (1–5)	Ramos (10)	19,893	14–20	L1
35	May 12	Padres	0–3	Shields (2–5)	**Nelson** (4–3)	Buchter (1)	17,374	14–21	L2
36	May 13	Padres	1–0	**Guerra** (2–0)	Friedrich (0–1)	**Jeffress** (9)	35,291	15–21	W1
37	May 14	Padres	7–8 (12)	Campos (1–0)	**Capuano** (1–1)	Villanueva (1)	28,896	15–22	L1
38	May 15	Padres	3–2	**Boyer** (1–0)	Quackenbush (1–2)	**Jeffress** (10)	26,306	16–22	W1
39	May 17	Cubs	4–2	**Anderson** (2–5)	Hendricks (2–3)	**Jeffress** (11)	24,361	17–22	W2
40	May 18	Cubs	1–2 (13)	Wood (2–0)	**Torres** (0–1)	Richard (1)	31,212	17–23	L1
41	May 19	Cubs	5–3	**Guerra** (3–0)	Hammel (5–1)	**Thornburg** (1)	38,781	18–23	W1
42	May 20	@ Mets	2–3	Matz (6–1)	**Peralta** (2–5)	Familia (14)	36,239	18–24	L1
43	May 21	@ Mets	4–5	Familia (1–0)	**Blazek** (1–1)	—	39,688	18–25	L2
44	May 22	@ Mets	1–3	Syndergaard (5–2)	**Anderson** (2–6)	Familia (15)	40,173	18–26	L3
45	May 24	@ Braves	2–1	**Blazek** (2–1)	Norris (1–6)	**Jeffress** (12)	15,185	19–26	W1
46	May 25	@ Braves	3–2 (13)	**Blazek** (3–1)	Kelly (0–2)	**Torres** (1)	12,869	20–26	W2
47	May 26	@ Braves	6–2	**Peralta** (3–5)	Wisler (2–4)	**Torres** (2)	14,885	21–26	W3
48	May 27	Reds	9–5	**Davies** (2–3)	Lamb (0–3)	—	20,441	22–26	W4
49	May 28	Reds	6–7	Wood (4–1)	**Jeffress** (1–1)	Cingrani (4)	30,293	22–27	L1
50	May 29	Reds	5–4	**Nelson** (5–3)	Finnegan (1–4)	**Boyer** (1)	34,901	23–27	W1
51	May 30	Cardinals	0–6	Martínez (5–5)	**Guerra** (3–1)	—	34,569	23–28	L1
52	May 31	Cardinals	3–10	Leake (4–4)	**Peralta** (3–6)	—	24,487	23–29	L2

June: 12–14 (Home: 8–5; Away: 4–9)

#	Date	Opponent	Score	Win	Loss	Save	Attendance	Record	Streak
53	June 1	Cardinals	3–1	**Davies** (3–3)	García (4–5)	**Jeffress** (13)	24,050	24–29	W1
54	June 2	@ Phillies	4–1	**Anderson** (3–6)	Eickhoff (2–8)	**Jeffress** (14)	22,890	25–29	W2
55	June 3	@ Phillies	3–6	Bailey (3–0)	**Nelson** (5–4)	Gómez (18)	20,138	25–30	L1
56	June 4	@ Phillies	6–3	**Smith** (1–0)	Neris (1–3)	**Jeffress** (15)	25,177	26–30	W1
57	June 5	@ Phillies	1–8	Nola (5–4)	**Peralta** (3–7)	—	24,259	26–31	L1
58	June 7	Athletics	5–4	**Davies** (4–3)	Manaea (2–4)	**Jeffress** (16)	19,283	27–31	W1
59	June 8	Athletics	4–0	**Anderson** (4–6)	Hahn (2–4)	—	18,188	28–31	W2
60	June 9	Mets	2–5	Colón (5–3)	**Nelson** (5–5)	Familia (20)	22,980	28–32	L1
61	June 10	Mets	1–2 (11)	Blevins (2–0)	**Boyer** (1–1)	Familia (21)	27,358	28–33	L2
62	June 11	Mets	7–4	**Peralta** (4–7)	Verrett (3–4)	**Jeffress** (17)	38,423	29–33	W1
63	June 12	Mets	5–3	**Davies** (5–3)	Matz (7–3)	**Jeffress** (18)	32,491	30–33	W2
64	June 13	@ Giants	5–11	Suárez (2–1)	**Knebel** (0–1)	Law (1)	41,543	30–34	L1
65	June 14	@ Giants	2–3	Bumgarner (8–2)	**Smith** (1–1)	Casilla (14)	41,750	30–35	L2
66	June 15	@ Giants	1–10	Cueto (10–1)	**Nelson** (5–6)	—	41,811	30–36	L3
67	June 16	@ Dodgers	8–6	**Thornburg** (3–1)	Báez (0–2)	**Jeffress** (19)	44,183	31–36	W1
68	June 17	@ Dodgers	2–3 (10)	Báez (1–2)	**Jeffress** (1–2)	—	44,998	31–37	L1
69	June 18	@ Dodgers	6–10	Hatcher (4–3)	**Anderson** (4–7)	—	44,112	31–38	L2
70	June 19	@ Dodgers	1–2	Jansen (3–2)	**Thornburg** (3–2)	—	45,931	31–39	L3
71	June 21	@ Athletics	3–5	Doolittle (2–2)	**Smith** (1–2)	Madson (13)	14,810	31–40	L4
72	June 22	@ Athletics	4–2	**Guerra** (4–1)	Mengden (0–3)	**Thornburg** (2)	13,586	32–40	W1
73	June 24	Nationals	5–3	**Torres** (1–1)	Scherzer (8–5)	**Jeffress** (20)	32,668	33–40	W2
74	June 25	Nationals	6–5	**Garza** (1–0)	González (3–7)	**Jeffress** (21)	30,085	34–40	W3
75	June 26	Nationals	2–3	Roark (7–5)	**Barnes** (0–1)	Kelley (3)	30,215	34–41	L1
76	June 28	Dodgers	5–6	Urías (1–2)	**Anderson** (4–8)	Jansen (23)	33,819	34–42	L2
77	June 29	Dodgers	7–0	**Guerra** (5–1)	Stewart (0–1)	—	26,566	35–42	W1
78	June 30	Dodgers	1–8	Maeda (7–5)	**Davies** (5–4)	—	33,029	35–43	L1

July: 12–13 (Home: 8–5; Away: 4–8)

#	Date	Opponent	Score	Win	Loss	Save	Attendance	Record	Streak
79	July 1	@ Cardinals	1–7	García (6–6)	**Garza** (1–1)	—	42,987	35–44	L2
80	July 2	@ Cardinals	0–3	Wainwright (7–5)	**Nelson** (5–7)	Oh (1)	40,573	35–45	L3
81	July 3	@ Cardinals	8–9	Wacha (5–7)	**Anderson** (4–9)	Oh (2)	41,148	35–46	L4
82	July 4	@ Nationals	1–0	**Guerra** (6–1)	Scherzer (9–6)	**Jeffress** (22)	29,174	36–46	W1
83	July 5	@ Nationals	5–2	**Davies** (6–4)	González (4–8)	**Jeffress** (23)	25,138	37–46	W2
84	July 6	@ Nationals	4–7	Roark (8–5)	**Garza** (1–2)	Papelbon (17)	26,330	37–47	L1
85	July 8	Cardinals	4–3	**Jeffress** (2–2)	Rosenthal (2–4)	—	28,343	38–47	W1
86	July 9	Cardinals	1–8	Martínez (8–6)	**Anderson** (4–10)	—	37,101	38–48	L1
87	July 10	Cardinals	1–5	Leake (6–7)	**Guerra** (6–2)	—	42,066	38–49	L2
**87th All-Star Game in San Diego, California**
88	July 15	@ Reds	4–5	DeSclafani (4–0)	**Garza** (1–3)	Ohlendorf (2)	30,680	38–50	L3
89	July 16	@ Reds	9–1	**Nelson** (6–7)	Lamb (1–7)	—	31,328	39–50	W1
90	July 17	@ Reds	0–1	Cingrani (2–2)	**Thornburg** (3–3)	—	23,085	39–51	L1
91	July 19	@ Pirates	2–3	Melancon (1–1)	**Thornburg** (3–4)	—	27,106	39–52	L2
92	July 20	@ Pirates	9–5	**Torres** (2–1)	Locke (8–6)	—	36,717	40–52	W1
93	July 21	@ Pirates	3–5	Liriano (6–9)	**Garza** (1–4)	Melancon (28)	35,978	40–53	L1
94	July 22	Cubs	2–5	Hammel (9–5)	**Nelson** (6–8)	Rondón (17)	42,243	40–54	L2
95	July 23	Cubs	6–1	**Davies** (7–4)	Lackey (7–7)	—	44,643	41–54	W1
96	July 24	Cubs	5–6	Nathan (1–0)	**Smith** (1–3)	Rondón (18)	43,310	41–55	L1
97	July 25	D-backs	7–2	**Anderson** (5–10)	Shipley (0–1)	—	25,347	42–55	W1
98	July 26	D-backs	9–4	**Thornburg** (4–4)	Hudson (1–2)	—	24,074	43–55	W2
99	July 27	D-backs	1–8	Bradley (4–6)	**Nelson** (6–9)	—	22,581	43–56	L1
100	July 28	D-backs	6–4	**Davies** (8–4)	Ray (5–10)	**Jeffress** (24)	33,971	44–56	W1
101	July 29	Pirates	3–1	**Guerra** (7–2)	Brault (0–1)	**Jeffress** (25)	29,442	45–56	W2
102	July 30	Pirates	5–3	**Anderson** (6–10)	Taillon (2–2)	**Jeffress** (26)	36,663	46–56	W3
103	July 31	Pirates	4–2	**Garza** (2–4)	Liriano (6–11)	**Jeffress** (27)	32,405	47–56	W4

August: 10–20 (Home: 7–10; Away: 3–10)

#	Date	Opponent	Score	Win	Loss	Save	Attendance	Record	Streak
104	August 1	@ Padres	3–7	Villanueva (2–2)	**Nelson** (6–10)	—	24,009	47–57	L1
105	August 2	@ Padres	3–2	**Davies** (9–4)	Perdomo (5–5)	**Thornburg** (3)	26,152	48–57	W1
106	August 3	@ Padres	3–12	Jackson (2–2)	**Guerra** (7–3)	—	24,124	48–58	L1
107	August 5	@ D-backs	2–3 (11)	Loewen (1–0)	**Boyer** (1–2)	—	20,008	48–59	L2
108	August 6	@ D-backs	15–6	**Garza** (3–4)	Corbin (4–11)	—	29,370	49–59	W1
109	August 7	@ D-backs	3–9	Hudson (2–2)	**Nelson** (6–11)	—	24,021	49–60	L1
110	August 8	Braves	3–4 (12)	Cunniff (1–0)	**Torres** (2–2)	Johnson (9)	20,976	49–61	L2
111	August 9	Braves	1–2	Jenkins (2–2)	**Peralta** (4–8)	Cabrera (3)	20,048	49–62	L3
112	August 10	Braves	4–3	**Anderson** (7–10)	De La Cruz (0–5)	**Thornburg** (4)	20,035	50–62	W1
113	August 11	Braves	11–3	**Garza** (4–4)	Hernández (1–1)	—	30,167	51–62	W2
114	August 12	Reds	4–7	Bailey (2–1)	**Nelson** (6–12)	—	24,553	51–63	L1
115	August 13	Reds	5–11	Straily (8–6)	**Davies** (9–5)	—	30,357	51–64	L2
116	August 14	Reds	7–3	**Peralta** (5–8)	Reed (0–7)	—	30,103	52–64	W1
117	August 16	@ Cubs	0–4	Cahill (2–3)	**Garza** (4–5)	Chapman (25)	41,148	52–65	L1
118	August 16	@ Cubs	1–4	Hammel (13–5)	**Mariñez** (0–1)	Chapman (26)	39,420	52–66	L2
119	August 17	@ Cubs	1–6	Lester (13–4)	**Nelson** (6–13)	—	40,310	52–67	L3
120	August 18	@ Cubs	6–9	Arrieta (15–5)	**Davies** (9–6)	Chapman (27)	41,407	52–68	L4
121	August 19	@ Mariners	6–7	LeBlanc (3–0)	**Suter** (0–1)	Díaz (9)	37,758	52–69	L5
122	August 20	@ Mariners	2–8	Hernández (8–4)	**Peralta** (5–9)	—	29,170	52–70	L6
123	August 21	@ Mariners	7–6	**Thornburg** (5–4)	Wilhelmsen (2–4)	—	35,833	53–70	W1
124	August 22	Rockies	4–2	**Nelson** (7–13)	Bettis (10–7)	**Thornburg** (5)	20,458	54–70	W2
125	August 23	Rockies	6–4	**Suter** (1–1)	Logan (2–3)	**Knebel** (1)	21,460	55–70	W3
126	August 24	Rockies	7–1	**Davies** (10–6)	Anderson (4–5)	—	26,702	56–70	W4
127	August 25	Pirates	2–3 (10)	Bastardo (2–0)	**Torres** (2–3)	Watson (8)	20,296	56–71	L1
128	August 26	Pirates	3–5	Vogelsong (3–3)	**Garza** (4–6)	Watson (9)	25,474	56–72	L2
129	August 27	Pirates	6–9	Locke (9–7)	**Boyer** (1–3)	Feliz (2)	35,295	56–73	L3
130	August 28	Pirates	1–3	Nova (11–6)	**Anderson** (7–11)	Watson (10)	37,583	56–74	L4
131	August 29	Cardinals	5–6	Socolovich (1–0)	**Thornburg** (5–5)	Oh (14)	18,663	56–75	L5
132	August 30	Cardinals	1–2 (10)	Oh (4–2)	**Knebel** (0–2)	Duke (2)	22,918	56–76	L6
133	August 31	Cardinals	3–1	**Garza** (5–6)	Weaver (1–2)	**Thornburg** (6)	17,645	57–76	W1

September: 14–13 (Home: 4–5; Away: 10–8)

#	Date	Opponent	Score	Win	Loss	Save	Attendance	Record	Streak
134	September 2	@ Pirates	1–0	**Boyer** (2–3)	Taillon (3–4)	**Thornburg** (7)	21,772	58–76	W2
135	September 3	@ Pirates	7–4	**Torres** (3–3)	Feliz (4–2)	**Thornburg** (8)	26,637	59–76	W3
136	September 4	@ Pirates	10–0	**Anderson** (8–11)	Brault (0–2)	—	25,318	60–76	W4
137	September 5	Cubs	2–7	Hendricks (14–7)	**Davies** (10–7)	—	43,662	60–77	L1
138	September 6	Cubs	12–5	**Peralta** (6–9)	Hammel (14–8)	—	32,888	61–77	W1
139	September 7	Cubs	2–1	**Knebel** (1–2)	Smith (2–5)	**Thornburg** (9)	23,832	62–77	W2
140	September 8	@ Cardinals	12–5	**Guerra** (8–3)	García (10–12)	—	40,416	63–77	W3
141	September 9	@ Cardinals	3–4	Martínez (14–7)	**Nelson** (7–14)	Oh (17)	42,647	63–78	L1
142	September 10	@ Cardinals	1–5	Wainwright (11–8)	**Knebel** (1–3)	—	45,440	63–79	L2
143	September 11	@ Cardinals	2–1	**Thornburg** (6–5)	Siegrist (5–3)	—	44,703	64–79	W1
144	September 12	@ Reds	0–3	Wood (6–3)	**Peralta** (6–10)	Iglesias (3)	14,671	64–80	L1
145	September 13	@ Reds	4–6	Straily (12–8)	**Garza** (5–7)	—	12,926	64–81	L2
146	September 14	@ Reds	7–0	**Guerra** (9–3)	Adleman (2–4)	—	14,368	65–81	W1
147	September 15	@ Cubs	5–4	**Nelson** (8–14)	Grimm (1–1)	**Thornburg** (10)	41,362	66–81	W2
148	September 16	@ Cubs	4–5 (10)	Chapman (4–1)	**Boyer** (2–4)	—	40,823	66–82	L1
149	September 17	@ Cubs	11–3	**Davies** (11–7)	Arrieta (17–7)	—	40,956	67–82	W1
150	September 18	@ Cubs	3–1	**Peralta** (7–10)	Hendricks (15–8)	**Thornburg** (11)	41,286	68–82	W2
151	September 20	Pirates	3–6	Hughes (1–1)	**Garza** (5–8)	Watson (14)	20,829	68–83	L1
152	September 21	Pirates	1–4	Kuhl (5–3)	**Nelson** (8–15)	Watson (15)	25,482	68–84	L2
153	September 22	Pirates	3–1	**Anderson** (9–11)	Vogelsong (3–6)	**Thornburg** (12)	24,582	69–84	W1
154	September 23	Reds	5–4	**Suter** (2–1)	DeSclafani (8–5)	**Thornburg** (13)	35,364	70–84	W2
155	September 24	Reds	1–6	Straily (14–8)	**Jungmann** (0–5)	—	31,398	70–85	L1
156	September 25	Reds	2–4	Finnegan (10–11)	**Peralta** (7–11)	Iglesias (4)	31,776	70–86	L2
157	September 26	@ Rangers	8–3	**Garza** (6–8)	Pérez (10–11)	—	27,263	71–86	W1
158	September 27	@ Rangers	4–6	Barnette (7–3)	**Nelson** (8–16)	Dyson (37)	29,668	71–87	L1
159	September 28	@ Rangers	5–8	Jeffress (3–2)	**Knebel** (1–4)	—	36,619	71–88	L2
160	September 30	@ Rockies	1–4	Bettis (14–8)	**Suter** (2–2)	Ottavino (7)	41,068	71–89	L3

October: 2–0 (Home: 0–0; Away: 2–0)

#	Date	Opponent	Score	Win	Loss	Save	Attendance	Record	Streak
161	October 1	@ Rockies	4–3 (10)	**Thornburg** (7–5)	Ottavino (1–3)	**Barnes** (1)	32,835	72–89	W1
162	October 2	@ Rockies	6–4 (10)	**Thornburg** (8–5)	Rusin (3–5)	**Knebel** (2)	27,762	73–89	W2

- Brewers win
- Brewers loss
- Postponement
- Bold: Brewers team member

== Detailed Records ==
National League
Opponent	Home	Away	Total	Pct.	Runs scored	Runs allowed
NL East
Atlanta Braves	2–2	3–0	5–2	.714	30	17
Miami Marlins	1–2	1–2	2–4	.333	35	27
New York Mets	2–2	0–3	2–5	.286	22	25
Philadelphia Phillies	1–2	2–2	3–4	.429	30	38
Washington Nationals	2–1	2–1	4–2	.667	23	20
	8–9	8–8	16–17	.485	140	127
NL Central
Milwaukee Brewers	—	—	—	—	—	—
Chicago Cubs	5–4	3–7	8–11	.421	75	79
Cincinnati Reds	4–5	4–6	8–11	.421	92	92
Pittsburgh Pirates	4–6	5–4	9–10	.474	74	72
St. Louis Cardinals	3–6	3–7	6–13	.316	55	97
	16–21	15–24	31–45	.408	296	340
NL West
Arizona Diamondbacks	3–1	1–2	4–3	.571	43	36
Colorado Rockies	3–0	2–1	5–1	.833	28	18
Los Angeles Dodgers	1–2	1–3	2–5	.286	30	35
San Diego Padres	2–2	1–2	3–4	.429	20	34
San Francisco Giants	1–2	0–3	1–5	.167	16	41
	10–7	5–11	15–18	.455	137	164

American League
Opponent	Home	Away	Total	Pct.	Runs scored	Runs allowed
Houston Astros	2–1	—	2–1	.667	13	12
Los Angeles Angels of Anaheim	2–1	—	2–1	.667	16	16
Minnesota Twins	1–1	1–1	2–2	.500	21	25
Oakland Athletics	2–0	1–1	3–1	.750	16	11
Seattle Mariners	—	1–2	1–2	.333	15	21
Texas Rangers	—	1–2	1–2	.333	17	17
	7–3	4–6	11–9	.550	98	102

== Roster ==
2016 Milwaukee Brewers
Roster
Pitchers: 57 Chase Anderson; 50 Jacob Barnes; 54 Michael Blazek; 48 Blaine Boyer; 39 Chris Capuano; 45 Tyler Cravy; 27 Zach Davies; 51 Sam Freeman; 22 Matt Garza; 32 David Goforth; 41 Junior Guerra; 21 Jeremy Jeffress; 26 Taylor Jungmann; 50 Michael Kirkman; 46 Corey Knebel; 51 Damien Magnifico; 53 Jhan Mariñez; 52 Jimmy Nelson; 58 Ariel Peña; 38 Wily Peralta; 58 Neil Ramirez; 47 Ben Rowen; 58 Rob Scahill; 13 Will Smith; 35 Brent Suter; 37 Tyler Thornburg; 59 Carlos Torres	Catchers: 20 Jonathan Lucroy; 12 Martín Maldonado; 9 Manny Piña; 13 Andrew Susac; Infielders: 3 Orlando Arcia; 33 Chris Carter; 2 Scooter Gennett; 9 Aaron Hill; 15 Will Middlebrooks; 29 Yadiel Rivera; 5 Jonathan Villar; 7 Colin Walsh; 24 Andy Wilkins	Outfielders: 8 Ryan Braun; 23 Keon Broxton; 7 Jake Elmore; 18 Ramón Flores; 10 Kirk Nieuwenhuis; 14 Hernán Pérez; 15 Alex Presley; 25 Michael Reed; 16 Domingo Santana; Other batters: 21 Josmil Pinto	Manager: 30 Craig Counsell; Coaches: 11 Darnell Coles (hitting); 56 Joe Crawford (coach); 55 Marcus Hanel (bullpen catcher); 36 Derek Johnson (pitching); 40 Jason Lane (assistant hitting); 49 Pat Murphy (bench); 6 Ed Sedar (third base); 31 Carlos Subero (first base); 43 Lee Tunnell (bullpen)

== Player stats ==
=== Batting ===
Note: G = Games played; AB = At bats; R = Runs; H = Hits; 2B = Doubles; 3B = Triples; HR = Home runs; RBI = Runs batted in; SB = Stolen bases; BB = Walks; AVG = Batting average; SLG = Slugging average

Player	G	AB	R	H	2B	3B	HR	RBI	SB	BB	AVG	SLG
Jonathan Villar	156	589	92	168	38	3	19	63	62	79	.285	.457
Chris Carter	160	549	84	122	27	1	41	94	3	76	.222	.499
Ryan Braun	135	511	80	156	23	3	30	91	16	46	.305	.538
Scooter Gennett	136	498	58	131	30	1	14	56	8	38	.263	.412
Hernán Pérez	123	404	50	110	18	3	13	56	34	18	.272	.428
Jonathan Lucroy	95	338	48	101	17	3	13	50	5	33	.299	.482
Kirk Nieuwenhuis	125	335	38	70	18	1	13	44	8	56	.209	.385
Aaron Hill	78	254	34	72	11	0	8	29	4	30	.283	.421
Ramón Flores	104	249	18	51	8	0	2	19	3	31	.205	.261
Domingo Santana	77	246	34	63	14	0	11	32	2	32	.256	.447
Martín Maldonado	76	208	21	42	7	0	8	21	1	35	.202	.351
Keon Broxton	75	207	28	50	10	1	9	19	23	36	.242	.430
Orlando Arcia	55	201	21	44	10	3	4	17	8	15	.219	.358
Alex Presley	47	116	12	23	2	0	3	11	0	11	.198	.293
Jake Elmore	59	78	7	17	2	0	0	4	2	17	.218	.244
Manny Piña	33	71	4	18	4	0	2	12	0	10	.254	.344
Yadiel Rivera	35	66	12	14	4	0	0	3	0	2	.212	.273
Colin Walsh	38	47	4	4	1	0	0	2	0	15	.085	.106
Will Middlebrooks	10	27	2	3	0	0	0	1	0	4	.111	.111
Andy Wilkins	26	24	3	3	1	0	1	3	1	3	.125	.292
Michael Reed	8	22	3	4	0	0	0	0	1	2	.182	.182
Andrew Susac	9	17	3	4	1	0	1	2	0	2	.235	.471
Josmil Pinto	6	5	1	0	0	0	0	0	0	1	.000	.000
Pitcher totals	162	268	14	29	3	0	2	12	0	7	.108	.142
Team totals	162	5330	671	1299	249	19	194	641	181	599	.244	.407

=== Pitching ===
Note: W = Wins; L = Losses; ERA = Earned run average; G = Games pitched; GS = Games started; SV = Saves; IP = Innings pitched; H = Hits allowed; R = Runs allowed; ER = Earned runs allowed; BB = Walks allowed; SO = Strikeouts

Player	W	L	ERA	G	GS	SV	IP	H	R	ER	BB	SO
Jimmy Nelson	8	16	4.62	32	32	0	179.1	186	108	92	86	140
Zach Davies	11	7	3.97	28	28	0	163.1	166	79	72	38	135
Chase Anderson	9	11	4.39	31	30	0	151.2	155	83	74	53	120
Wily Peralta	7	11	4.86	23	23	0	127.2	152	73	69	43	93
Junior Guerra	9	3	2.81	20	20	0	121.2	94	40	38	43	100
Matt Garza	6	8	4.51	19	19	0	101.2	117	67	51	36	70
Carlos Torres	3	3	2.73	72	0	2	82.1	65	26	25	30	78
Tyler Thornburg	8	5	2.15	67	0	13	67.0	38	19	16	25	90
Blaine Boyer	2	4	3.95	61	0	1	66.0	80	30	29	17	26
Jhan Mariñez	0	1	3.22	43	0	0	58.2	60	24	21	21	47
Jeremy Jeffress	2	2	2.22	47	0	27	44.2	45	13	11	11	35
Michael Blazek	3	1	5.66	41	0	0	41.1	52	31	26	27	36
Corey Knebel	1	4	4.68	35	0	2	32.2	32	20	17	16	38
Tyler Cravy	0	1	2.86	20	2	0	28.1	21	9	9	12	22
Taylor Jungmann	0	5	7.76	8	6	0	26.2	30	24	23	17	18
Jacob Barnes	0	1	2.70	27	0	1	26.2	24	9	8	6	26
Chris Capuano	1	1	4.13	16	0	0	24.0	23	11	11	15	27
Will Smith	1	3	3.68	27	0	0	22.0	18	13	9	9	22
Brent Suter	2	2	3.32	14	2	0	21.2	25	8	8	5	15
Rob Scahill	0	0	2.45	16	0	0	18.1	16	5	5	3	14
David Goforth	0	0	10.97	10	0	0	10.2	18	14	13	4	9
Sam Freeman	0	0	12.91	7	0	0	7.2	13	11	11	9	8
Ben Rowen	0	0	15.00	4	0	0	3.0	10	6	5	0	2
Damien Magnifico	0	0	6.00	3	0	0	3.0	2	2	2	3	0
Neil Ramírez	0	0	10.80	2	0	0	1.2	2	2	2	0	3
Ariel Peña	0	0	27.00	1	0	0	1.2	5	5	5	2	0
Michael Kirkman	0	0	9.00	1	0	0	1.0	1	1	1	1	1
Team totals	73	89	4.08	162	162	46	1434.1	1450	733	650	532	1175

== Farm system ==
The Brewers' farm system consisted of seven minor league affiliates in 2016.

Level	Team	League	Manager
Triple-A	Colorado Springs Sky Sox	Pacific Coast League	Rick Sweet
Double-A	Biloxi Shuckers	Southern League	Mike Guerrero
Class A-Advanced	Brevard County Manatees	Florida State League	Joe Ayrault
Class A	Wisconsin Timber Rattlers	Midwest League	Matt Erickson
Rookie	Helena Brewers	Pioneer League	Néstor Corredor
Rookie	AZL Brewers	Arizona League	Tony Diggs
Rookie	DSL Brewers	Dominican Summer League	—
