= 2016 Miami Marlins season =

2016 Miami Marlins
- League: National League
- Division: East
- Ballpark: Marlins Park
- City: Miami, Florida
- Record: 79–82 (.491)
- Divisional place: 3rd
- Owners: Jeffrey Loria
- President of baseball operations: Michael Hill
- General managers: Michael Hill
- Managers: Don Mattingly
- Television: Fox Sports Florida; Sun Sports (English: Rich Waltz, Preston Wilson, Eduardo Perez, Al Leiter, Jeff Conine) (Spanish: Raul Striker Jr.)
- Radio: Miami Marlins Radio Network (English) (Dave Van Horne, Glenn Geffner); WAQI (Spanish) (Felo Ramírez, Luis Quintana)

The Miami Marlins' 2016 season was the 24th season for the Major League Baseball franchise, and the fifth as the "Miami" Marlins. This was the first season under manager Don Mattingly. The Marlins finished in third place in the National League East and they failed to make the playoffs for the 13th consecutive season. Although the team was over .500 as late as September, they faltered down the stretch and missed the playoffs.

== Season standings ==
=== National League East ===
NL East
| Team | W | L | Pct. | GB | Home | Road |
|---|---|---|---|---|---|---|
| Washington Nationals | 95 | 67 | .586 | — | 50‍–‍31 | 45‍–‍36 |
| New York Mets | 87 | 75 | .537 | 8 | 44‍–‍37 | 43‍–‍38 |
| Miami Marlins | 79 | 82 | .491 | 15½ | 40‍–‍40 | 39‍–‍42 |
| Philadelphia Phillies | 71 | 91 | .438 | 24 | 37‍–‍44 | 34‍–‍47 |
| Atlanta Braves | 68 | 93 | .422 | 26½ | 31‍–‍50 | 37‍–‍43 |

=== National League Wild Card ===
Division leaders
| Team | W | L | Pct. |
|---|---|---|---|
| Chicago Cubs | 103 | 58 | .640 |
| Washington Nationals | 95 | 67 | .586 |
| Los Angeles Dodgers | 91 | 71 | .562 |

Wild Card teams (Top 2 teams qualify for postseason)
| Team | W | L | Pct. | GB |
|---|---|---|---|---|
| New York Mets | 87 | 75 | .537 | — |
| San Francisco Giants | 87 | 75 | .537 | — |
| St. Louis Cardinals | 86 | 76 | .531 | 1 |
| Miami Marlins | 79 | 82 | .491 | 7½ |
| Pittsburgh Pirates | 78 | 83 | .484 | 8½ |
| Colorado Rockies | 75 | 87 | .463 | 12 |
| Milwaukee Brewers | 73 | 89 | .451 | 14 |
| Philadelphia Phillies | 71 | 91 | .438 | 16 |
| Arizona Diamondbacks | 69 | 93 | .426 | 18 |
| Atlanta Braves | 68 | 93 | .422 | 18½ |
| San Diego Padres | 68 | 94 | .420 | 19 |
| Cincinnati Reds | 68 | 94 | .420 | 19 |

=== Record vs. opponents ===
2016 National League record Source: MLB Standings Grid – 2016
| Team | AZ | ATL | CHC | CIN | COL | LAD | MIA | MIL | NYM | PHI | PIT | SD | SF | STL | WSH | AL |
|---|---|---|---|---|---|---|---|---|---|---|---|---|---|---|---|---|
| Arizona | — | 5–2 | 2–5 | 3–3 | 10–9 | 7–12 | 2–4 | 3–4 | 5–1 | 4–3 | 1–5 | 10–9 | 6–13 | 4–3 | 2–5 | 5–15 |
| Atlanta | 2–5 | — | 3–3 | 3–4 | 1–6 | 1–5 | 11–7 | 2–5 | 10–9 | 11–8 | 3–4 | 4–2 | 3–4 | 2–4 | 4–15 | 8–12 |
| Chicago | 5–2 | 3–3 | — | 15–4 | 2–4 | 4–3 | 4–3 | 11–8 | 2–5 | 5–1 | 14–4 | 4–2 | 4–3 | 10–9 | 5–2 | 15–5 |
| Cincinnati | 3–3 | 4–3 | 4–15 | — | 5–2 | 2–5 | 3–4 | 11–8 | 0–6 | 4–2 | 9–10 | 3–4 | 3–3 | 9–10 | 3–4 | 5–15 |
| Colorado | 9–10 | 6–1 | 4–2 | 2–5 | — | 7–12 | 2–5 | 1–5 | 6–1 | 2–5 | 2–5 | 10–9 | 9–10 | 2–4 | 4–2 | 9–11 |
| Los Angeles | 12–7 | 5–1 | 3–4 | 5–2 | 12–7 | — | 1–6 | 5–2 | 4–3 | 4–2 | 2–5 | 11–8 | 8–11 | 4–2 | 5–1 | 10–10 |
| Miami | 4–2 | 7–11 | 3–4 | 4–3 | 5–2 | 6–1 | — | 4–2 | 7–12 | 9–10 | 6–1 | 3–3 | 2–4 | 4–3 | 9–10 | 6–14 |
| Milwaukee | 4–3 | 5–2 | 8–11 | 8–11 | 5–1 | 2–5 | 2–4 | — | 2–5 | 3–4 | 9–10 | 3–4 | 1–5 | 6–13 | 4–2 | 11–9 |
| New York | 1–5 | 9–10 | 5–2 | 6–0 | 1–6 | 3–4 | 12–7 | 5–2 | — | 12–7 | 3–3 | 4–3 | 4–3 | 3–3 | 7–12 | 12–8 |
| Philadelphia | 3–4 | 8–11 | 1–5 | 2–4 | 5–2 | 2–4 | 10–9 | 4–3 | 7–12 | — | 3–4 | 5–2 | 3–3 | 2–5 | 5–14 | 11–9 |
| Pittsburgh | 5–1 | 4–3 | 4–14 | 10–9 | 5–2 | 5–2 | 1–6 | 10–9 | 3–3 | 4–3 | — | 3–3 | 4–3 | 9–10 | 2–4 | 9–11 |
| San Diego | 9–10 | 2–4 | 2–4 | 4–3 | 9–10 | 8–11 | 3–3 | 4–3 | 3–4 | 2–5 | 3–3 | — | 8–11 | 1–6 | 4–3 | 6–14 |
| San Francisco | 13–6 | 4–3 | 3–4 | 3–3 | 10–9 | 11–8 | 4–2 | 5–1 | 3–4 | 3–3 | 3–4 | 11–8 | — | 3–4 | 3–4 | 8–12 |
| St. Louis | 3–4 | 4–2 | 9–10 | 10–9 | 4–2 | 2–4 | 3–4 | 13–6 | 3–3 | 5–2 | 10–9 | 6–1 | 4–3 | — | 2–5 | 8–12 |
| Washington | 5–2 | 15–4 | 2–5 | 4–3 | 2–4 | 1–5 | 10–9 | 2–4 | 12–7 | 14–5 | 4–2 | 3–4 | 4–3 | 5–2 | — | 12–8 |

=== Detailed records ===
National League
| Opponent | W | L | WP | RS | RA |
NL East
| Atlanta Braves | 7 | 11 | 0.389 | 78 | 94 |
| Miami Marlins | | | | | |
| New York Mets | 7 | 12 | 0.368 | 66 | 80 |
| Philadelphia Phillies | 9 | 10 | 0.474 | 72 | 65 |
| Washington Nationals | 9 | 10 | 0.474 | 68 | 74 |
| Total | 32 | 43 | 0.427 | 284 | 313 |
NL Central
| Chicago Cubs | 3 | 4 | 0.429 | 29 | 27 |
| Cincinnati Reds | 4 | 3 | 0.571 | 29 | 23 |
| Milwaukee Brewers | 4 | 2 | 0.667 | 27 | 35 |
| Pittsburgh Pirates | 6 | 1 | 0.857 | 22 | 24 |
| St. Louis Cardinals | 4 | 3 | 0.571 | 39 | 34 |
| Total | 21 | 13 | 0.618 | 146 | 143 |
NL West
| Arizona Diamondbacks | 4 | 2 | 0.667 | 26 | 24 |
| Colorado Rockies | 5 | 2 | 0.714 | 41 | 34 |
| Los Angeles Dodgers | 6 | 1 | 0.857 | 23 | 14 |
| San Diego Padres | 3 | 3 | 0.500 | 29 | 22 |
| San Francisco Giants | 2 | 4 | 0.333 | 17 | 28 |
| Total | 20 | 12 | 0.625 | 136 | 122 |
American League
| Chicago White Sox | 1 | 2 | 0.333 | 14 | 16 |
| Cleveland Indians | 0 | 3 | 0.000 | 10 | 20 |
| Detroit Tigers | 0 | 4 | 0.000 | 18 | 32 |
| Kansas City Royals | 1 | 2 | 0.333 | 5 | 6 |
| Minnesota Twins | 1 | 2 | 0.333 | 19 | 16 |
| Tampa Bay Rays | 3 | 1 | 0.750 | 23 | 14 |
| Total | 6 | 14 | 0.300 | 89 | 104 |
| Season Total | 79 | 82 | 0.491 | 655 | 682 |

| Month | Games | Won | Lost | Win % | RS | RA |
|---|---|---|---|---|---|---|
| April | 23 | 12 | 11 | 0.522 | 92 | 94 |
| May | 29 | 15 | 14 | 0.517 | 113 | 124 |
| June | 27 | 14 | 13 | 0.519 | 126 | 116 |
| July | 26 | 16 | 10 | 0.615 | 120 | 95 |
| August | 28 | 10 | 18 | 0.357 | 97 | 115 |
| September | 26 | 12 | 14 | 0.462 | 99 | 126 |
| October | 2 | 0 | 2 | 0.000 | 8 | 12 |
| Total | 161 | 79 | 82 | 0.491 | 655 | 682 |

| | Games | Won | Lost | Win % | RS | RA |
| Home | 80 | 40 | 40 | 0.500 | 302 | 302 |
| Away | 81 | 39 | 42 | 0.481 | 353 | 380 |
| Total | 161 | 79 | 82 | 0.491 | 655 | 682 |

== Game log ==
Legend
| | Marlins win |
| | Marlins loss |
| | Postponement |
| **Bold** | Marlins team member |

Game log: 79–82 (Home: 40–40; Away: 39–42)
April: 12–11 (Home: 2–7; Away 10–4)

| # | Date | Opponent | Score | Win | Loss | Save | Attendance | Record | Streak |
|---|---|---|---|---|---|---|---|---|---|
| 1 | April 5 | Tigers | 7–8 (11) | VerHagen (1–0) | **Breslow** (0–1) | Greene (1) | 36,911 | 0–1 | L1 |
| 2 | April 6 | Tigers | 3–7 | Sánchez (1–0) | **Fernández** (0–1) | Rodriguez (1) | 17,883 | 0–2 | L2 |
| 3 | April 7 | @ Nationals | 6–4 | **Phelps** (1–0) | Roark (0–1) | **Ramos** (1) | 41,650 | 1–2 | W1 |
| – | April 9 | @ Nationals | Postponed (inclement weather) Rescheduled for May 14 as part of a doubleheader | | | | | | |
| 4 | April 10 | @ Nationals | 2–4 | Ross (1–0) | **Koehler** (0–1) | Papelbon (3) | 24,593 | 1–3 | L1 |
| 5 | April 11 | @ Mets | 10–3 | **Narveson** (1–0) | Matz (0–1) | — | 24,318 | 2–3 | W1 |
| 6 | April 12 | @ Mets | 2–1 | **Phelps** (2–0) | Henderson (0–1) | **Ramos** (2) | 28,923 | 3–3 | W2 |
| 7 | April 13 | @ Mets | 1–2 | Blevins (0–1) | **McGowan** (0–1) | Familia (2) | 22,113 | 3–4 | L1 |
| 8 | April 15 | Braves | 3–6 | Ogando (1–0) | **Phelps** (2–1) | Vizcaino (1) | 18,071 | 3–5 | L2 |
| 9 | April 16 | Braves | 4–6 | Norris (1–2) | **Koehler** (0–2) | Grilli (1) | 33,123 | 3–6 | L3 |
| 10 | April 17 | Braves | 5–6 (10) | Grilli (1–0) | **Jackson** (0–1) | Wisler (1) | 24,780 | 3–7 | L4 |
| 11 | April 18 | Nationals | 6–1 | **Fernández** (1–1) | Roark (1–2) | — | 16,112 | 4–7 | W1 |
| 12 | April 19 | Nationals | 0–7 | Strasburg (3–0) | **Conley** (0–1) | — | 16,529 | 4–8 | L1 |
| 13 | April 20 | Nationals | 1–3 | Petit (1–0) | **Chen** (0–1) | Papelbon (6) | 16,961 | 4–9 | L2 |
| 14 | April 21 | Nationals | 5–1 | **Koehler** (1–2) | Scherzer (2–1) | — | 17,395 | 5–9 | W1 |
| 15 | April 22 | @ Giants | 1–8 | Samardzija (2–1) | **Cosart** (0–1) | — | 41,760 | 5–10 | L1 |
| 16 | April 23 | @ Giants | 2–7 | Peavy (1–1) | **Fernández** (1–2) | — | 41,886 | 5–11 | L2 |
| 17 | April 24 | @ Giants | 5–4 | **Barraclough** (1–0) | Osich (0–1) | **Ramos** (3) | 41,509 | 6–11 | W1 |
| 18 | April 25 | @ Dodgers | 3–2 | **Chen** (1–1) | Stripling (0–1) | **Ramos** (4) | 44,954 | 7–11 | W2 |
| 19 | April 26 | @ Dodgers | 6–3 | **Koehler** (2–2) | Kershaw (2–1) | **Ramos** (5) | 41,102 | 8–11 | W3 |
| 20 | April 27 | @ Dodgers | 2–0 | **Nicolino** (1–0) | Kazmir (1–2) | **Ureña** (1) | 38,909 | 9–11 | W4 |
| 21 | April 28 | @ Dodgers | 5–3 | **Fernández** (2–2) | Maeda (3–1) | **Ramos** (6) | 44,009 | 10–11 | W5 |
| 22 | April 29 | @ Brewers | 6–3 | **Conley** (1–1) | Davies (0–3) | **Ramos** (7) | 23,215 | 11–11 | W6 |
| 23 | April 30 | @ Brewers | 7–5 | **Chen** (2–1) | Anderson (1–3) | **Phelps** (1) | 28,193 | 12–11 | W7 |

May: 15–14 (Home: 10–7; Away 5–7)

| # | Date | Opponent | Score | Win | Loss | Save | Attendance | Record | Streak |
|---|---|---|---|---|---|---|---|---|---|
| 24 | May 1 | @ Brewers | 5–14 | Peralta (2–3) | **Koehler** (2–3) | — | 28,181 | 12–12 | L1 |
| 25 | May 3 | D-backs | 7–4 | **Nicolino** (2–0) | Chafin (0–1) | **Ramos** (8) | 16,323 | 13–12 | W1 |
| 26 | May 4 | D-backs | 4–3 | **Fernández** (3–2) | De La Rosa (3–4) | **Ramos** (9) | 17,043 | 14–12 | W2 |
| 27 | May 5 | D-backs | 4–0 | **Conley** (2–1) | Ray (1–2) | — | 16,704 | 15–12 | W3 |
| 28 | May 6 | Phillies | 6–4 | **Barraclough** (2–0) | Neris (0–1) | **Phelps** (2) | 19,983 | 16–12 | W4 |
| 29 | May 7 | Phillies | 3–4 | Obetholtzer (2–0) | **Breslow** (0–2) | Gómez (10) | 21,719 | 16–13 | L1 |
| 30 | May 8 | Phillies | 5–6 | Neris (1–1) | **Phelps** (2–2) | Gómez (11) | 19,625 | 16–14 | L2 |
| 31 | May 9 | Brewers | 4–1 | **Fernández** (4–2) | Peralta (2–4) | **Morris** (1) | 16,769 | 17–14 | W1 |
| 32 | May 10 | Brewers | 2–10 | Davies (1–3) | **Conley** (2–2) | — | 17,225 | 17–15 | L1 |
| 33 | May 11 | Brewers | 3–2 | **Chen** (3–1) | Anderson (1–5) | **Ramos** (10) | 19,893 | 18–15 | W1 |
| 34 | May 13 | @ Nationals | 3–5 | Treinen W (3–1) | **Barraclough** L (2–1) | Papelbon (10) | 28,232 | 18–16 | L1 |
| 35 | May 14 (1) | @ Nationals | 4–6 | Strasburg (6–0) | **Nicolino** (2–1) | Papelbon (11) | 28,634 | 18–17 | L2 |
| 36 | May 14 (2) | @ Nationals | 7–1 | **Ureña** (1–0) | Roark (2–3) | — | 30,019 | 19–17 | W1 |
| 37 | May 15 | @ Nationals | 5–1 | **Fernández** (5–2) | Ross (3–3) | **Ramos** (11) | 36,786 | 20–17 | W2 |
| 38 | May 16 | @ Phillies | 5–3 | **Conley** (3–2) | Eickhoff (1–6) | **Ramos** (12) | 28,348 | 21–17 | W3 |
| 39 | May 17 | @ Phillies | 1–3 | Velasquez (5–1) | **Chen** (3–2) | Gómez (15) | 18,140 | 21–18 | L1 |
| 40 | May 18 | @ Phillies | 2–4 | Hellickson (4–2) | **Koehler** (2–4) | Gómez (16) | 29,579 | 21–19 | L2 |
| 41 | May 20 | Nationals | 1–4 | Roark (3–3) | **Nicolino** (2–2) | Papelbon (12) | 20,017 | 21–20 | L3 |
| 42 | May 21 | Nationals | 3–2 | **Fernández** (6–2) | Ross (3–4) | **Ramos** (13) | 25,839 | 22–20 | W1 |
| 43 | May 22 | Nationals | 2–8 | Scherzer (5–3) | **Conley** (3–3) | — | 24,308 | 22–21 | L1 |
| 44 | May 23 | Rays | 7–6 | **Phelps** (3–2) | Ramirez (6–2) | **Ramos** (14) | 17,969 | 23–21 | W1 |
| 45 | May 24 | Rays | 3–4 | Odorizzi (2–2) | **Koehler** (2–5) | Colomé (12) | 23,709 | 23–22 | L1 |
| 46 | May 25 | @ Rays | 4–3 | **Barraclough** (3–1) | Sturdevant (0–1) | **Ramos** (15) | 13,554 | 24–22 | W1 |
| 47 | May 26 | @ Rays | 9–1 | **Fernández** (7–2) | Smyly (2–6) | — | 11,399 | 25–22 | W2 |
| 48 | May 27 | @ Braves | 2–4 | Krol (1–0) | **Phelps** (3–3) | Vizcaino (6) | 19,325 | 25–23 | L1 |
| 49 | May 28 | @ Braves | 2–7 | O'Flaherty (1–3) | **Ureña** (1–1) | — | 33,879 | 25–24 | L2 |
| 50 | May 29 | @ Braves | 7–3 | **Koehler** (3–5) | Teheran (1–5) | — | 50,247 | 26–24 | W1 |
| 51 | May 30 | Pirates | 0–10 | Locke (4–3) | **Nicolino** (2–3) | — | 10,856 | 26–25 | L1 |
| 52 | May 31 | Pirates | 3–1 | **Fernández** (8–2) | Cole (5–4) | **Ramos** (16) | 10,637 | 27–25 | W1 |

June: 14–13 (Home: 10–5; Away 4–8)

| # | Date | Opponent | Score | Win | Loss | Save | Attendance | Record | Streak |
|---|---|---|---|---|---|---|---|---|---|
| 53 | June 1 | Pirates | 3–2 | **Phelps** (4–3) | Watson (1–1) | **Ramos** (17) | 17,018 | 28–25 | W2 |
| 54 | June 2 | Pirates | 4–3 (12) | **Wittgren** (1–0) | Schugel (1–2) | — | 19,907 | 29–25 | W3 |
| 55 | June 3 | Mets | 2–6 | Syndergaard (6–2) | **Koehler** (3–6) | — | 22,269 | 29–26 | L1 |
| 56 | June 4 | Mets | 4–6 | Henderson (1–2) | **Phelps** (4–4) | Familia (18) | 24,668 | 29–27 | L2 |
| 57 | June 5 | Mets | 1–0 | **Fernández** (9–2) | Harvey (4–8) | **Ramos** (18) | 28,196 | 30–27 | W1 |
| 58 | June 7 | @ Twins | 4–6 (11) | Boshers (1–0) | **McGowan** (0–2) | — | 19,020 | 30–28 | L2 |
| 59 | June 8 | @ Twins | 5–7 | Rogers (2–0) | **Wittgren** (1–1) | Kintzler (1) | 21,527 | 30–29 | L3 |
| 60 | June 9 | @ Twins | 10–3 | **Koehler** (4–6) | Santana (1–6) | — | 18,792 | 31–29 | W1 |
| 61 | June 10 | @ D-backs | 8–6 | **Ellington** (1–0) | Clippard (2–3) | **Ramos** (19) | 26,970 | 32–29 | W2 |
| 62 | June 11 | @ D-backs | 3–5 | Godley (1–0) | **Fernández** (9–3) | Ziegler (12) | 33,442 | 32–30 | L1 |
| 63 | June 12 | @ D-backs | 0–6 | Ray (3–5) | **Conley** (3–4) | — | 27,741 | 32–31 | L2 |
| 64 | June 13 | @ Padres | 13–4 | **Chen** (4–2) | Rea (3–3) | — | 20,988 | 33–31 | W1 |
| 65 | June 14 | @ Padres | 5–2 | **Koehler** (5–6) | Pomeranz (5–7) | **Ramos** (20) | 22,051 | 34–31 | W2 |
| 66 | June 15 | @ Padres | 3–6 | Perdomo (2–2) | **Nicolino** (2–4) | Rodney (13) | 20,037 | 34–32 | L1 |
| 67 | June 17 | Rockies | 5–1 | **Wittgren** (2–1) | Gray (4–3) | — | 19,767 | 35–32 | W1 |
| 68 | June 18 | Rockies | 9–6 | **McGowan** (1–2) | Butler (2–4) | **Ramos** (21) | 19,565 | 36–32 | W2 |
| 69 | June 19 | Rockies | 3–0 | **Koehler** (6–6) | Anderson (0–1) | **Ramos** (22) | 24,993 | 37–32 | W3 |
| 70 | June 20 | Rockies | 3–5 | De La Rosa (4–4) | **Ellington** (1–1) | Estévez (4) | 18,187 | 37–33 | L1 |
| 71 | June 21 | Braves | 2–3 | Withrow (2–0) | **Barraclough** (3–2) | Vizcaíno (8) | 19,961 | 37–34 | L2 |
| 72 | June 22 | Braves | 3–0 | **Conley** (4–4) | Gant (1–2) | **Ramos** (23) | 22,642 | 38–34 | W1 |
| 73 | June 23 | Cubs | 4–2 | **Barraclough** (4–2) | Strop (1–2) | **Phelps** (3) | 25,291 | 39–34 | W2 |
| 74 | June 24 | Cubs | 4–5 | Cahill (1–2) | **Dunn** (0–1) | Rondon (13) | 24,385 | 39–35 | L1 |
| 75 | June 25 | Cubs | 9–6 | **Clemens** (1–0) | Lackey (7–4) | **Ramos** (24) | 29,457 | 40–35 | W1 |
| 76 | June 26 | Cubs | 6–1 | **Fernández** (10–3) | Hammel (7–4) | — | 27,318 | 41–35 | W2 |
| 77 | June 28 | @ Tigers | 5–7 | Pelfrey (2–7) | **Conley** (4–5) | Rodriguez (21) | 30,808 | 41–36 | L1 |
| 78 | June 29 | @ Tigers | 3–10 | Norris (1–0) | **Koehler** (6–7) | — | 31,760 | 41–37 | L2 |
| 79 | June 30 | @ Braves | 5–8 | Alvarez (2–1) | **Chen** (4–3) | Cabrera (1) | 16,097 | 41–38 | L3 |

July: 16–10 (Home: 8–5; Away 8–5)

| # | Date | Opponent | Score | Win | Loss | Save | Attendance | Record | Streak |
|---|---|---|---|---|---|---|---|---|---|
| 80 | July 1 | @ Braves | 7–5 (12) | **Wittgren** (3–1) | Kelly (0–3) | **McGowan** (1) | 32,036 | 42–38 | W1 |
| 81 | July 2 | @ Braves | 1–9 | Harrell (1–0) | **Fernández** (10–4) | — | 23,448 | 42–39 | L1 |
| 82 | July 3 | @ Braves (Fort Bragg Stadium) | 5–2 | **Conley** (5–5) | Wisler (3–8) | — | 12,582 | 43–39 | W1 |
| 83 | July 4 | @ Mets | 6–8 | Blevins (3–0) | **Rodney** (0–2) | Familia (29) | 30,424 | 43–40 | L1 |
| 84 | July 5 | @ Mets | 5–2 | **Chen** (5–3) | Matz (7–4) | **Ramos** (25) | 29,477 | 44–40 | W1 |
| 85 | July 6 | @ Mets | 2–4 | deGrom (5–4) | **Nicolino** (2–5) | Familia (30) | 26,191 | 44–41 | L1 |
| 86 | July 8 | Reds | 3–1 | **Fernández** (11–4) | Straily (4–6) | **Ramos** (26) | 22,333 | 45–41 | W1 |
| 87 | July 9 | Reds | 4–2 | **Conley** (6–5) | Lamb (1–6) | **Ramos** (27) | 23,653 | 46–41 | W2 |
| 88 | July 10 | Reds | 7–3 | **Dunn** (1–1) | Reed (0–4) | — | 22,394 | 47–41 | W3 |
**87th All-Star Game in San Diego, California**
| 89 | July 15 | @ Cardinals | 7–6 | **Rodney** (1–2) | Oh (2–1) | **Ramos** (28) | 42,034 | 48–41 | W4 |
| 90 | July 16 | @ Cardinals | 0–5 | Wainwright (9–5) | **Koehler** (6–8) | — | 44,840 | 48–42 | L1 |
| 91 | July 17 | @ Cardinals | 6–3 | **Barraclough** (5–2) | Broxton (1–2) | **Ramos** (29) | 43,046 | 49–42 | W1 |
| 92 | July 18 | @ Phillies | 3–2 (11) | **Barraclough** (6–2) | Oberholtzer (2–2) | **Ramos** (30) | 19,115 | 50–42 | W2 |
| 93 | July 19 | @ Phillies | 2–1 (10) | **Dunn** (2–1) | Hernandez (1–3) | **Ramos** (31) | 18,347 | 51–42 | W3 |
| 94 | July 20 | @ Phillies | 1–4 | Hellickson (7–7) | **Chen** (5–4) | Gómez (26) | 20,654 | 51–43 | L1 |
| 95 | July 21 | @ Phillies | 9–3 | **Koehler** (7–8) | Eickhoff (6–11) | — | 27,839 | 52–43 | W1 |
| 96 | July 22 | Mets | 3–5 | Robles (5–3) | **Phelps** (4–5) | Familia (34) | 23,661 | 52–44 | L1 |
| 97 | July 23 | Mets | 7–2 | **Fernández** (12–4) | deGrom (6–5) | — | 26,481 | 53–44 | W1 |
| 98 | July 24 | Mets | 0–3 | Matz (8–6) | **Urena** (1–2) | Familia (35) | 25,004 | 53–45 | L1 |
| 99 | July 25 | Phillies | 0–4 | Hernandez (2–3) | **Rodney** (1–3) | — | 19,465 | 53–46 | L2 |
| 100 | July 26 | Phillies | 5–0 | **Koehler** (8–8) | Eickhoff (6–12) | — | 20,365 | 54–46 | W1 |
| 101 | July 27 | Phillies | 11–1 | **Conley** (7–5) | Eflin (3–4) | — | 32,403 | 55–46 | W2 |
| 102 | July 28 | Cardinals | 4–5 | Wacha (6–7) | **Fernández** (12–5) | Oh (7) | 25,060 | 55–47 | L1 |
| 103 | July 29 | Cardinals | 6–11 | Leake (8–8) | **Urena** (1–3) | — | 27,414 | 55–48 | L2 |
| 104 | July 30 | Cardinals | 11–0 | Phelps (5–5) | **Garcia** (7–8) | — | | 56–48 | W1 |
| 105 | July 31 | Cardinals | 5–4 | Ramos (1–0) | **Bowman** (1–3) | — | | 57–48 | W2 |

August: 10–18 (Home: 4–8; Away: 6–10)

| # | Date | Opponent | Score | Win | Loss | Save | Attendance | Record | Streak |
|---|---|---|---|---|---|---|---|---|---|
| 106 | August 1 | @ Cubs | 0–6 | Hendricks (10–7) | **Conley** (7–6) | — | 40,937 | 57–49 | L1 |
| 107 | August 2 | @ Cubs | 2–3 | Hammel (11–5) | **Fernández** (12–6) | Champan (22) | 40,419 | 57–50 | L2 |
| 108 | August 3 | @ Cubs | 4–5 | Grimm (1–0) | **Ramos** (1–1) | — | 47,147 | 57–51 | L3 |
| 109 | August 5 | @ Rockies | 5–3 | Ellington (2–1) | **Estevez** (2–6) | Ramos (32) | 27,888 | 58–51 | W1 |
| 110 | August 6 | @ Rockies | 6–12 | Bettis (10–6) | **Cashner** (4–8) | — | 37,699 | 58–52 | L1 |
| 111 | August 7 | @ Rockies | 10–7 | **Conley** (8–6) | **Gray** (8–5) | Rodney (18) | 40,875 | 59–52 | W1 |
| 112 | August 8 | Giants | 7–8 (14) | Kontos (3–2) | **McGowan** (1–3) | — | 22,806 | 59–53 | L1 |
| 113 | August 9 | Giants | 2–0 | **Koehler** (9–8) | Moore (7–8) | **Rodney** (19) | 19,636 | 60–53 | W1 |
| 114 | August 10 | Giants | 0–1 | Samardzija (10–8) | **Phelps** (5–6) | Casilla (26) | 21,096 | 60–54 | L1 |
| 115 | August 12 | White Sox | 2–4 | Rodon (3–8) | **Cashner** (4–9) | Robertson (28) | 21,090 | 60–55 | L2 |
| 116 | August 13 | White Sox | 8–9 | Beck (1–0) | **Barraclough** (6–3) | Robertson (29) | 20,006 | 60–56 | L3 |
| 117 | August 14 | White Sox | 5–4 | **Dunn** (3–1) | Sale (14–6) | Rodney (20) | 21,401 | 61–56 | W1 |
| 118 | August 15 | @ Reds | 6–3 | **Phelps** (6–6) | Finnegan (7–9) | Rodney (21) | 16,918 | 62–56 | W2 |
| 119 | August 16 | @ Reds | 3–6 | DeSclafani (7–1) | **Ureña** (1–4) | Cingrani (14) | 14,440 | 62–57 | L1 |
| 120 | August 17 | @ Reds | 2–3 | Smith (2–1) | **Wittgren** (3–2) | Cingrani (15) | 13,973 | 62–58 | L2 |
| 121 | August 18 | @ Reds | 4–5 | Straily (9–6) | **Fernandez** (12–7) | Iglesias (2) | 14,018 | 62–59 | L3 |
| 122 | August 19 | @ Pirates | 6–5 | **Wittgren** (3–2) | Feliz (4–1) | Rodney (22) | 32,957 | 63–59 | W1 |
| 123 | August 20 | @ Pirates | 3–1 | **Phelps** (7–6) | Khul (3–1) | Rodney (23) | 37.828 | 64–59 | W2 |
| 124 | August 21 | @ Pirates | 3–2 | **Ureña** (2–4) | Vogelsong (2–3) | Rodney (24) | 28,616 | 65–59 | W3 |
| 125 | August 23 | Royals | 0–1 | Ventura (9–9) | **Cashner** (4–10) | Herrera (8) | 18,518 | 65–60 | L1 |
| 126 | August 24 | Royals | 3–0 | **Fernández** (13–7) | Gee (5–7) | **Rodney** (25) | 17,894 | 66–60 | W1 |
| 127 | August 25 | Royals | 2–5 | Vólquez (10–10) | **Koehler** (9–9) | Herrera (9) | 19,045 | 66–61 | L1 |
| 128 | August 26 | Padres | 7–6 | Rodney (2–3) | **Maruer** (0–4) | — | 17,775 | 67–61 | W1 |
| 129 | August 27 | Padres | 0–1 | Richard (1–3) | **Ureña** (2–5) | Quackenbush (1) | 20,007 | 67–62 | L1 |
| 130 | August 28 | Padres | 1–3 | Perdomo (7–7) | **Nicolino** (2–6) | — | 19,883 | 67–63 | L2 |
| 131 | August 29 | @ Mets | 1–2 (10) | Smoker (1–0) | **Wittgren** (1–4) | — | 32,188 | 67–64 | L3 |
| 132 | August 30 | @ Mets | 4–7 | Lugo (2–2) | **Koehler** (9–10) | Familia (43) | 32,634 | 67–65 | L4 |
| 133 | August 31 | @ Mets | 2–5 | Reed (4–2) | **Ramos** (1–2) | Familia (44) | 33,471 | 67–66 | L5 |

September: 12–14 (Home: 7–8; Away: 5–6)

| # | Date | Opponent | Score | Win | Loss | Save | Attendance | Record | Streak |
|---|---|---|---|---|---|---|---|---|---|
| 134 | September 1 | @ Mets | 6–4 | Urena (3–5) | DeGrom (7–8) | — | 29,330 | 68–66 | W1 |
| 135 | September 2 | @ Indians | 2–6 | Carrasco (10–7) | **Cashner** (4–11) | — | 24,415 | 68–67 | L1 |
| 136 | September 3 | @ Indians | 3–8 | Bauer (10–6) | **Fernández** (13–8) | — | 27,483 | 68–68 | L2 |
| 137 | September 4 | @ Indians | 5–6 | Allen (3–5) | **Rodney** (2–4) | — | 25,910 | 68–69 | L3 |
| 138 | September 5 | Phillies | 2–6 | Eickhoff (10–13) | **Esch** (0–1) | — | 20,849 | 68–70 | L4 |
| 139 | September 6 | Phillies | 3–4 | Morgan (2–9) | **Ureña** (3–6) | Gomez (35) | 16,169 | 68–71 | L5 |
| 140 | September 7 | Phillies | 6–0 | **Cashner** (5–11) | Hellickson (10–9) | — | 16,592 | 69–71 | W1 |
| 141 | September 9 | Dodgers | 4–1 | **Fernández** (14–8) | Kershaw (11–3) | **Ramos** (33) | 22,940 | 70–71 | W2 |
| 142 | September 10 | Dodgers | 0–5 | Hill (12–3) | **Koehler** (9–11) | — | 20,933 | 70–72 | L1 |
| 143 | September 11 | Dodgers | 3–0 | **Ureña** (4–5) | Maeda (14–9) | **Ramos** (34) | 20,188 | 71–72 | W1 |
| 144 | September 12 | @ Braves | 7–12 | Roe (2–0) | **Ellington** (2–2) | — | 18,271 | 71–73 | L1 |
| 145 | September 13 | @ Braves | 7–5 | Nicolino (3–6) | **Wisler** (6–12) | **Ramos** (35) | 20,125 | 72–73 | W1 |
| 146 | September 14 | @ Braves | 7–5 | Fernández (15–8) | **Teherán** (5–10) | **Ramos** (36) | 21,498 | 73–73 | W2 |
| 147 | September 16 | @ Phillies | 3–4 (13) | Herrmann (1–2) | **Ramos** (1–3) | — | 18,171 | 73–74 | L1 |
| 148 | September 17 | @ Phillies | 0–8 | Hellickson (12–9) | **Ureña** (4–7) | — | 24,597 | 73–75 | L2 |
| 149 | September 18 | @ Phillies | 5–4 | **Dunn** (4–1) | Neris (4–4) | **Ramos** (37) | 20,059 | 74–75 | W1 |
| 150 | September 19 | Nationals | 4–3 | **Ellington** (3–2) | Latos (7–3) | **Ramos** (38) | 17,214 | 75–75 | W2 |
| 151 | September 20 | Nationals | 1–0 | **Fernández** (16–8) | Roark (15–9) | **Phelps** (4) | 17,961 | 76–75 | W3 |
| 152 | September 21 | Nationals | 3–8 | Scherzer (18–7) | **Koehler** (9–12) | — | 17,836 | 76–76 | L1 |
| 153 | September 22 | Braves | 3–6 | Collmenter (3–0) | **Ureña** (4–8) | Cabrera (5) | 22,086 | 76–77 | L2 |
| 154 | September 23 | Braves | 2–3 | Cunniff (2–0) | **Ramos** (1–4) | Cabrera (6) | 23,924 | 76–78 | L3 |
| 155 | September 24 | Braves | 6–4 | **Ellington** (4–2) | Blair (1–7) | **Ramos** (39) | 26,178 | 77–78 | W1 |
| – | September 25 | Braves | Game canceled (death of José Fernandez) | | | | | | |
| 156 | September 26 | Mets | 7–3 | **Dunn** (5–1) | Colón (14–8) | — | 26,933 | 78–78 | W2 |
| 157 | September 27 | Mets | 1–12 | Syndergaard (14–9) | Koehler (9–13) | — | 21,759 | 78–79 | L1 |
| 158 | September 28 | Mets | 2–5 | Lugo (5–2) | Urena (4–9) | Familia (50) | 24,335 | 78-80 | L2 |
| 159 | September 30 | @ Nationals | 7–4 | Dunn (6–1) | Solis (2–5) | Ramos (40) | 30,857 | 79–80 | W1 |

October: 0–2 (Home: 0–0; Away: 0–2)

| # | Date | Opponent | Score | Win | Loss | Save | Attendance | Record | Streak |
|---|---|---|---|---|---|---|---|---|---|
| 160 | October 1 | @ Nationals | 1–2 | Roark (16–10) | **Chen** (5–5) | Melancon (46) | 31,615 | 79–81 | L1 |
| 161 | October 2 | @ Nationals | 7–10 | Scherzer (20–7) | **Brice** (0–1) | Melancon (47) | 28,730 | 79–82 | L1 |

Legend: = Win = Loss = Postponement
Bold = Marlins team member

== Roster ==
2016 Miami Marlins
Roster
| Pitchers: 46 Kyle Barraclough; 17 Craig Breslow; 65 Austin Brice; 48 Andrew Cashner; 30 Hunter Cervenka; 54 Wei-Yin Chen; 50 Paul Clemens; 61 Adam Conley; 59 Jarred Cosart; 43 Odrisamer Despaigne; 40 Mike Dunn; 56 Cody Ege; 49 Brian Ellington; 67 Jake Esch; 16 José Fernández †; 63 Kendry Flores; 37 Cody Hall; 36 Edwin Jackson; 34 Tom Koehler; 33 Dustin McGowan; 57 Bryan Morris; 45 Chris Narveson; 20 Justin Nicolino; 55 Nefi Ogando; 35 David Phelps; 44 A. J. Ramos; 30 Colin Rea; 43 Jo-Jo Reyes; 56 Fernando Rodney; 62 José Ureña; 64 Nick Wittgren | Catchers: 6 Jeff Mathis; 11 J. T. Realmuto; 18 Tomás Telis; Infielders: 1 Robert Andino; 41 Justin Bour; 32 Derek Dietrich; 9 Dee Gordon; 3 Adeiny Hechavarria; 12 Chris Johnson; 31 Don Kelly; 77 Yefri Pérez; 14 Martín Prado; 19 Miguel Rojas; 53 Xavier Scruggs | Outfielders: 5 Jeff Francoeur; 28 Cole Gillespie; 68 Destin Hood; 13 Marcell Ozuna; 27 Giancarlo Stanton; 51 Ichiro Suzuki; 21 Christian Yelich; Other batters: 15 Oswaldo Arcia | Manager: 8 Don Mattingly; Coaches: 25 Barry Bonds (hitting); 26 Lorenzo Bundy (outfield, baserunning); 38 Reid Cornelius (bullpen); 29 Lenny Harris (third base); 7 Perry Hill (first base); 4 Frank Menechino (assistant hitting); 47 Juan Nieves (pitching); 23 Brian Schneider (catching); 72 Pat Shine (administrative coach); 75 Jeff Urgelles (bullpen catcher); 58 Tim Wallach (bench) |

== Statistics ==
=== Batting ===
(final statistics)

Note: G = Games played; AB = At bats; R = Runs; H = Hits; 2B = Doubles; 3B = Triples; HR = Home runs; RBI = Runs batted in; Avg. = Batting average; OBP = On-base percentage; SLG = Slugging percentage; SB = Stolen bases

| Player | G | AB | R | H | 2B | 3B | HR | RBI | AVG | OBP | SLG | SB |
|---|---|---|---|---|---|---|---|---|---|---|---|---|
| Robert Andino | 13 | 24 | 2 | 7 | 0 | 0 | 0 | 1 | .292 | .292 | .292 | 0 |
| Oswaldo Arcia | 2 | 2 | 0 | 0 | 0 | 0 | 0 | 0 | .000 | .000 | .000 | 0 |
| Kyle Barraclough | 75 | 1 | 0 | 0 | 0 | 0 | 0 | 0 | .000 | .000 | .000 | 0 |
| Justin Bour | 90 | 280 | 35 | 74 | 12 | 1 | 15 | 51 | .264 | .349 | .475 | 0 |
| Andrew Cashner | 12 | 16 | 1 | 3 | 0 | 0 | 0 | 0 | .188 | .235 | .188 | 0 |
| Wei-Yin Chen | 22 | 44 | 0 | 0 | 0 | 0 | 0 | 0 | .000 | .000 | .000 | 0 |
| Paul Clemens | 2 | 2 | 0 | 0 | 0 | 0 | 0 | 0 | .000 | .000 | .000 | 0 |
| Adam Conley | 25 | 41 | 4 | 5 | 0 | 0 | 0 | 2 | .122 | .140 | .122 | 0 |
| Jarred Cosart | 4 | 6 | 0 | 1 | 0 | 0 | 0 | 0 | .167 | .167 | .167 | 0 |
| Derek Dietrich | 128 | 351 | 39 | 98 | 20 | 5 | 7 | 42 | .279 | .374 | .425 | 1 |
| Cody Ege | 5 | 1 | 0 | 1 | 0 | 0 | 0 | 0 | 1.000 | 1.000 | 1.000 | 0 |
| Brian Ellington | 32 | 1 | 0 | 0 | 0 | 0 | 0 | 0 | .000 | .000 | .000 | 0 |
| Jake Esch | 3 | 5 | 1 | 0 | 0 | 0 | 0 | 0 | .200 | .200 | .200 | 0 |
| José Fernández | 30 | 52 | 3 | 13 | 2 | 0 | 0 | 6 | .250 | .264 | .288 | 0 |
| Kendry Flores | 1 | 1 | 1 | 0 | 0 | 0 | 0 | 0 | .000 | .000 | .000 | 0 |
| Jeff Francoeur | 26 | 50 | 4 | 14 | 2 | 1 | 0 | 1 | .280 | .333 | .360 | 0 |
| Cole Gillespie | 41 | 51 | 7 | 12 | 3 | 2 | 0 | 5 | .235 | .273 | .373 | 0 |
| Dee Gordon | 79 | 325 | 47 | 87 | 7 | 6 | 1 | 14 | .268 | .305 | .335 | 30 |
| Adeiny Hechavarria | 155 | 508 | 52 | 120 | 17 | 6 | 3 | 38 | .236 | .283 | .311 | 1 |
| Destin Hood | 13 | 25 | 3 | 6 | 1 | 0 | 1 | 2 | .240 | .240 | .400 | 0 |
| Chris Johnson | 113 | 243 | 20 | 54 | 11 | 0 | 5 | 24 | .222 | .281 | .329 | 0 |
| Don Kelly | 13 | 27 | 2 | 4 | 0 | 2 | 0 | 3 | .148 | .200 | .296 | 0 |
| Tom Koehler | 33 | 51 | 1 | 5 | 0 | 0 | 0 | 4 | .098 | .115 | .098 | 0 |
| Jeff Mathis | 41 | 126 | 12 | 30 | 4 | 1 | 2 | 15 | .238 | .267 | .333 | 0 |
| Dustin McGowan | 55 | 4 | 0 | 0 | 0 | 0 | 0 | 0 | .000 | .000 | .000 | 0 |
| Bryan Morris | 24 | 1 | 0 | 0 | 0 | 0 | 0 | 0 | .000 | .000 | .000 | 0 |
| Chris Narveson | 6 | 3 | 0 | 0 | 0 | 0 | 0 | 0 | .000 | .000 | .000 | 0 |
| Justin Nicolino | 18 | 22 | 0 | 2 | 0 | 0 | 0 | 0 | .091 | .130 | .091 | 0 |
| Marcell Ozuna | 148 | 557 | 75 | 148 | 23 | 6 | 23 | 76 | .266 | .321 | .452 | 0 |
| Yefri Pérez | 12 | 3 | 5 | 2 | 1 | 0 | 0 | 0 | .667 | .667 | 1.000 | 0 |
| David Phelps | 64 | 11 | 0 | 2 | 0 | 0 | 0 | 1 | .182 | .182 | .182 | 0 |
| Martín Prado | 153 | 600 | 70 | 183 | 37 | 3 | 8 | 75 | .305 | .359 | .417 | 2 |
| J. T. Realmuto | 137 | 509 | 60 | 154 | 31 | 0 | 11 | 48 | .303 | .343 | .428 | 12 |
| Miguel Rojas | 123 | 194 | 27 | 48 | 12 | 0 | 1 | 14 | .247 | .288 | .325 | 2 |
| Xavier Scruggs | 24 | 62 | 1 | 13 | 3 | 0 | 1 | 5 | .210 | .290 | .306 | 0 |
| Giancarlo Stanton | 119 | 413 | 56 | 99 | 20 | 1 | 27 | 74 | .240 | .326 | .489 | 0 |
| Ichiro Suzuki | 143 | 327 | 48 | 95 | 15 | 5 | 1 | 22 | .291 | .354 | .376 | 10 |
| Tomás Telis | 10 | 13 | 1 | 4 | 0 | 0 | 1 | 4 | .308 | .308 | .538 | 0 |
| José Ureña | 29 | 17 | 1 | 3 | 0 | 0 | 0 | 0 | .176 | .222 | .538 | 0 |
| Christian Yelich | 155 | 578 | 78 | 172 | 38 | 3 | 21 | 98 | .298 | .376 | .483 | 9 |
| Team totals | 161 | 5547 | 655 | 1460 | 259 | 42 | 128 | 626 | .263 | .322 | .394 | 71 |

=== Pitching ===
(final statistics)

Note: W = Wins; L = Losses; ERA = Earned run average; G = Games pitched; GS = Games started; SV = Saves; IP = Innings pitched; H = Hits allowed; R = Runs allowed; ER = Earned runs allowed; BB = Walks allowed; K = Strikeouts

| Player | W | L | ERA | G | GS | SV | IP | H | R | ER | BB | K |
|---|---|---|---|---|---|---|---|---|---|---|---|---|
| Kyle Barraclough | 6 | 3 | 2.85 | 75 | 0 | 0 | 72.2 | 45 | 24 | 23 | 44 | 113 |
| Craig Breslow | 0 | 2 | 4.50 | 15 | 0 | 0 | 14.0 | 21 | 9 | 7 | 4 | 7 |
| Austin Brice | 0 | 1 | 7.07 | 15 | 0 | 0 | 14.0 | 9 | 12 | 11 | 5 | 14 |
| Andrew Cashner | 1 | 4 | 5.98 | 12 | 11 | 0 | 52.2 | 62 | 36 | 35 | 30 | 45 |
| Hunter Cervenka | 0 | 0 | 4.82 | 18 | 0 | 0 | 9.1 | 11 | 5 | 5 | 5 | 7 |
| Wei-Yin Chen | 5 | 5 | 4.96 | 22 | 22 | 0 | 123.1 | 134 | 69 | 68 | 24 | 100 |
| Paul Clemens | 1 | 0 | 6.30 | 2 | 2 | 0 | 10.0 | 11 | 7 | 7 | 8 | 6 |
| Adam Conley | 8 | 6 | 3.85 | 25 | 25 | 0 | 133.1 | 125 | 59 | 57 | 62 | 124 |
| Jarred Cosart | 0 | 1 | 5.95 | 4 | 4 | 0 | 19.2 | 19 | 14 | 13 | 16 | 11 |
| Odrisamer Despaigne | 0 | 0 | 9.00 | 3 | 0 | 0 | 3.0 | 4 | 3 | 3 | 1 | 011 |
| Mike Dunn | 6 | 1 | 3.40 | 51 | 0 | 0 | 42.1 | 43 | 16 | 16 | 11 | 38 |
| Cody Ege | 0 | 0 | 12.00 | 5 | 0 | 0 | 3.0 | 8 | 4 | 4 | 2 | 2 |
| Brian Ellington | 4 | 2 | 2.45 | 32 | 0 | 0 | 33.0 | 27 | 10 | 9 | 16 | 32 |
| Jake Esch | 0 | 1 | 5.54 | 3 | 3 | 0 | 13.0 | 17 | 8 | 8 | 6 | 10 |
| José Fernández | 16 | 8 | 2.86 | 29 | 29 | 0 | 182.1 | 149 | 63 | 58 | 55 | 253 |
| Kendry Flores | 0 | 0 | 0.00 | 1 | 1 | 0 | 3.0 | 1 | 0 | 0 | 3 | 1 |
| Cody Hall | 0 | 0 | 12.00 | 2 | 0 | 0 | 3.0 | 4 | 4 | 4 | 3 | 1 |
| Edwin Jackson | 0 | 1 | 5.91 | 8 | 0 | 0 | 10.2 | 13 | 7 | 7 | 6 | 7 |
| Tom Koehler | 9 | 13 | 4.33 | 33 | 33 | 0 | 176.2 | 176 | 93 | 85 | 83 | 147 |
| Dustin McGowan | 1 | 3 | 2.82 | 55 | 0 | 1 | 67.0 | 49 | 26 | 21 | 33 | 63 |
| Bryan Morris | 0 | 0 | 3.06 | 24 | 0 | 1 | 17.2 | 15 | 7 | 6 | 10 | 13 |
| Chris Narveson | 1 | 0 | 8.64 | 6 | 0 | 0 | 8.1 | 10 | 8 | 8 | 2 | 6 |
| Justin Nicolino | 3 | 6 | 4.99 | 18 | 13 | 0 | 79.1 | 96 | 45 | 44 | 20 | 37 |
| Nefi Ogando | 0 | 0 | 2.30 | 14 | 0 | 0 | 15.2 | 10 | 5 | 4 | 8 | 8 |
| David Phelps | 7 | 6 | 2.28 | 64 | 5 | 6 | 86.2 | 61 | 23 | 22 | 38 | 114 |
| A.J. Ramos | 1 | 4 | 2.81 | 67 | 0 | 40 | 64.0 | 52 | 21 | 20 | 35 | 73 |
| Colin Rea | 0 | 0 | 0.00 | 1 | 1 | 0 | 3.1 | 1 | 0 | 0 | 0 | 4 |
| Jo-Jo Reyes | 0 | 0 | 9.00 | 1 | 0 | 0 | 2.0 | 3 | 2 | 2 | 1 | 0 |
| Fernando Rodney | 2 | 3 | 5.89 | 39 | 0 | 8 | 36.2 | 41 | 25 | 24 | 25 | 41 |
| José Ureña | 4 | 9 | 6.13 | 28 | 12 | 1 | 83.2 | 91 | 59 | 57 | 29 | 58 |
| Nick Wittgren | 4 | 3 | 3.14 | 48 | 0 | 0 | 51.2 | 50 | 18 | 18 | 10 | 42 |
| Team totals | 79 | 82 | 4.05 | 161 | 161 | 55 | 1435.0 | 1358 | 682 | 646 | 595 | 1379 |

== Farm system ==
| Level | Team | League | Manager |
|---|---|---|---|
| AAA | New Orleans Zephyrs | Pacific Coast League | Arnie Beyeler |
| AA | Jacksonville Suns | Southern League | Dave Berg |
| A-Advanced | Jupiter Hammerheads | Florida State League | Randy Ready |
| A | Greensboro Grasshoppers | South Atlantic League | Kevin Randel |
| A-Short Season | Batavia Muckdogs | New York–Penn League | Ángel Espada |
| Rookie | GCL Marlins | Arizona League | Julio Bruno |
