= José Fernández (right-handed pitcher) =

Cuban-born American baseball player (1992–2016)

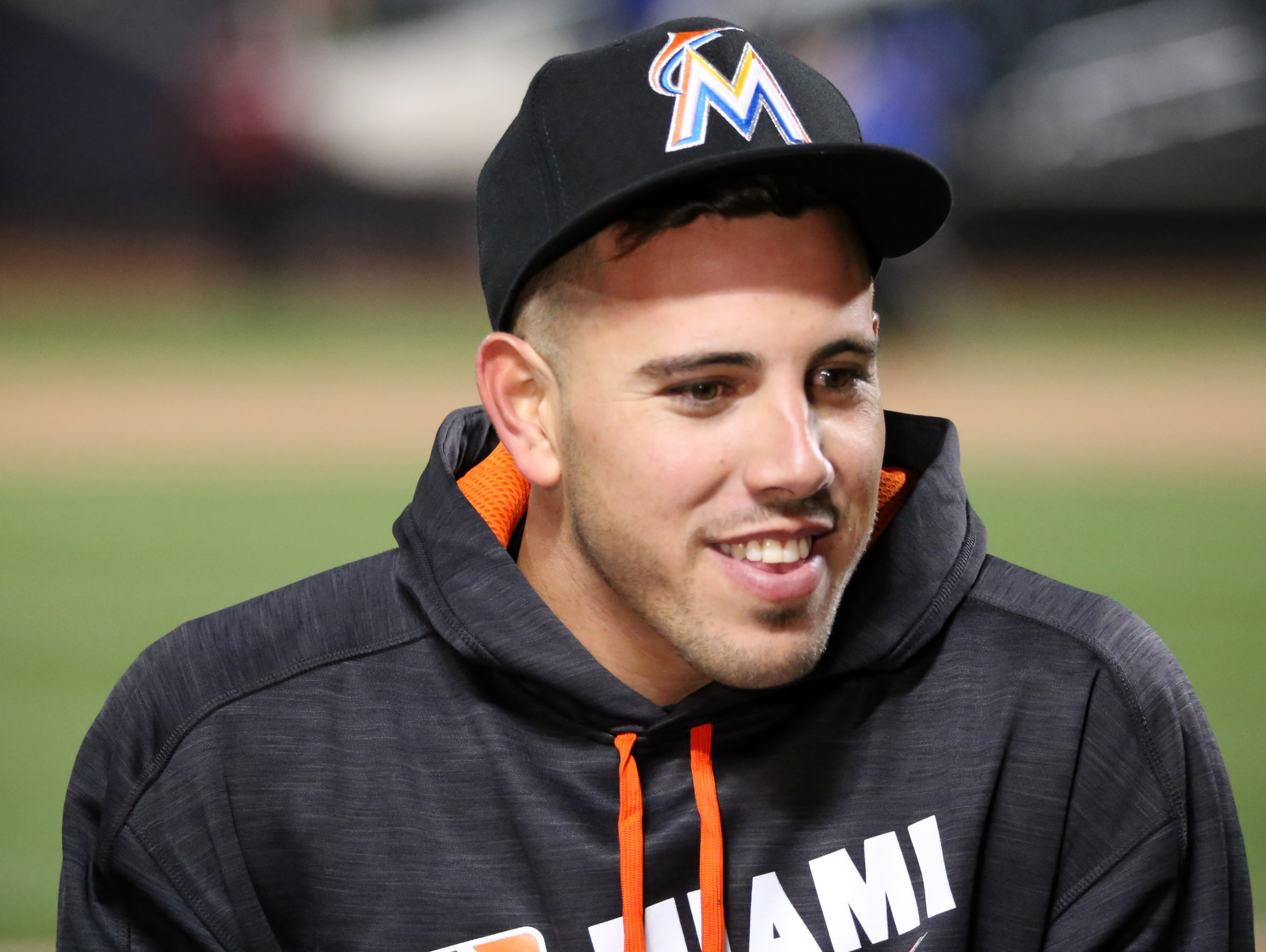
- Fernández with the Miami Marlins in 2016
- Pitcher
- Born: July 31, 1992; Santa Clara, Cuba
- Died: September 25, 2016 (aged 24); Miami Beach, Florida, U.S.
- Batted: Right Threw: Right

MLB debut
- April 7, 2013, for the Miami Marlins

Last MLB appearance
- September 20, 2016, for the Miami Marlins

MLB statistics
- Win–loss record: 38–17
- Earned run average: 2.58
- Strikeouts: 589
- Stats at Baseball Reference

Teams
- Miami Marlins (2013–2016)

Career highlights and awards
- 2× All-Star (2013, 2016); NL Rookie of the Year (2013)

José Delfín Fernández Gómez (July 31, 1992 – September 25, 2016) was a Cuban-born American professional baseball right-handed pitcher who played four seasons in Major League Baseball (MLB). He was a member of the Miami Marlins from 2013 until his death in 2016. He stood 6 feet 3 inches (1.91 m) tall and weighed 243 pounds (110 kg) during his playing career. He was affectionately known as "Niño" to his teammates and fans due to the youthful exuberance with which he played the game.

Fernández was born in Santa Clara, Cuba. He made three unsuccessful attempts at defecting to the United States before he finally succeeded in 2008. He enrolled at Braulio Alonso High School in Tampa, Florida, and was selected by the Marlins in the first round of the 2011 MLB draft. Fernández made his MLB debut with the Marlins on April 7, 2013. He was named to the 2013 National League All-Star Team, and won the National League (NL) Rookie of the Month Award in July and August. After the season, he won the NL Rookie of the Year Award and finished third in Cy Young Award balloting. He underwent Tommy John surgery during the 2014 season and was named to his second All-Star Game in 2016.

Fernández and two other men were killed in a pre-dawn boating crash into a jetty off the coast of Miami Beach, Florida, on September 25, 2016.

== Early life ==
José Delfín Fernández Gómez was born on July 31, 1992, in Santa Clara, Cuba. Growing up there, he lived on the same street as his friend and future Major League Baseball (MLB) shortstop Aledmys Díaz. They played for the same youth baseball team, and Díaz's father and uncle encouraged Fernández's mother to bring him to the ballpark. Fernández commented that he pursued a professional baseball career because Díaz's uncle had been an influence early in his life.

Ramón Jiménez, Fernández's stepfather, defected from Cuba in 2005, settling in Tampa, Florida. On three occasions, José unsuccessfully attempted to defect; each failed defection attempt was followed by a prison term. On his fourth attempt in 2007, José successfully defected at age 15 with his mother and sister. José's mother fell overboard when the boat hit turbulent waters, and he dived into the water to save her life. They reached Mexico and then moved to Tampa in 2008.

Ramon knew Orlando Chinea, a coach who lived in the Tampa area. Chinea had trained some of Cuba's top pitchers before he defected to Tampa. Ramon had José train with Chinea. He attended Braulio Alonso High School in Tampa, Florida. Playing on the high school baseball team, José was part of the Florida Class 6A state champions in his sophomore and senior seasons. Before his senior year in 2011, the Florida High School Athletic Association ruled that Fernández was ineligible, as he entered the ninth grade while in Cuba in 2006 and had therefore exhausted his eligibility. MLB's Cincinnati Reds were prepared to sign Fernández as an international free agent to a $1.3 million signing bonus. Fernández won an appeal and was declared eligible for his senior year, ending Cincinnati's pursuit. As a senior, Fernández pitched to a 13–1 win–loss record with a 2.35 earned run average (ERA) and 134 strikeouts. He also threw two no-hitters. He was committed to play baseball at the University of South Florida.

== Professional career ==
=== Draft and minor leagues ===
The Florida Marlins selected Fernández 14th overall in the first round of the 2011 MLB draft. Fernández signed with the Marlins, receiving a $2 million signing bonus. After he signed with the Marlins, he made one start for the Gulf Coast Marlins of the Rookie-level Gulf Coast League, and one start for the Jamestown Jammers of the Class A-Short Season New York–Penn League.

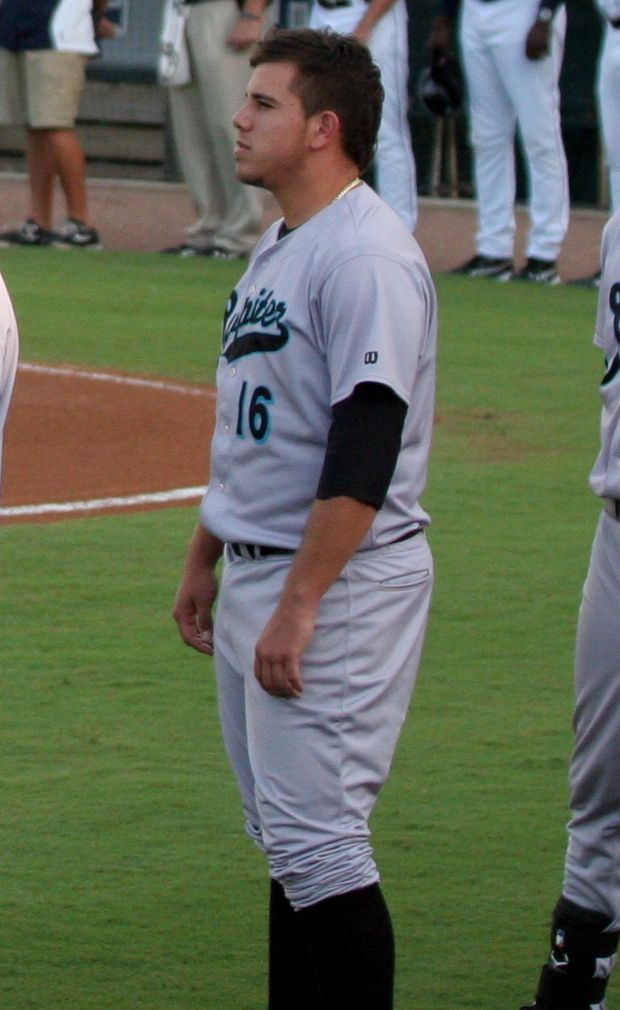
Fernández in the minor leagues with the Jupiter Hammerheads, 2012

Pitching for the Greensboro Grasshoppers of the Class A South Atlantic League (SAL) to start the 2012 season, Fernández threw the first six innings of a combined no-hitter. He was twice named the SAL pitcher of the week. Fernández was named to appear in the 2012 All-Star Futures Game. After pitching to a 7–0 win–loss record and a 1.59 ERA in 14 games for Greensboro, the Marlins promoted Fernández to the Jupiter Hammerheads of the Class A-Advanced Florida State League. He finished the 2012 season with a 14–1 win–loss record, a 1.75 ERA, and 158 strikeouts in 134 innings pitched at Greensboro and Jupiter. He was named the Marlins' Minor League Pitcher of the Year.

=== Miami Marlins (2013–2016) ===
==== 2013 season: Rookie of the Year ====
Prior to the 2013 season, Baseball America ranked Fernández as the Marlins' best prospect and the fifth best prospect in all of baseball. The Marlins invited Fernández to spring training but sent him to minor league camp before the season began. However, they chose to add Fernández to their 25-man Opening Day roster, due in part to injuries to Nathan Eovaldi and Henderson Álvarez. Also, Marlins owner Jeffrey Loria hoped that promoting Fernández would buy him goodwill with the fans, following a fire sale the previous offseason. He was planned to be limited to approximately 150 to 170 innings during the 2013 season in order to protect his development. He was the second youngest National League player that season, older only than the Nationals' Bryce Harper.

Fernández made his major league debut on April 7 against the New York Mets at Citi Field. He pitched five innings, allowing one run on three hits with eight strikeouts. He became the seventh pitcher since 1916 under the age of 21 who recorded at least eight strikeouts in his MLB debut. Fernández had a rough outing against the Tampa Bay Rays on May 27. Rays' manager Joe Maddon took to Twitter soon after watching Fernández pitch, saying, "José Fernández might be the best young pitcher I've ever seen, at that age. I believe he will go far."

On July 6, 2013, Fernández was selected to represent the Marlins for the National League All-Star team. He pitched a perfect 6th inning in the 2013 All-Star Game in which he struck out Dustin Pedroia, got Miguel Cabrera to pop out, and struck out Chris Davis. With this performance, Fernández is one of only three pitchers in the history of the All-Star Game who struck out two batters prior to their 21st birthday for their All-Star debut, the other two being Dwight Gooden and Bob Feller.

Fernández struck out 13 batters in a game against the Pittsburgh Pirates on July 28, earning the 3–2 victory. With Fernández's 14-strikeout performance against the Cleveland Indians on August 2, 2013, he became just the sixth pitcher since 2000 to strike out 13 or more batters in consecutive games. He established the Marlins' rookie record for most strikeouts in one game. For his performance in July 2013, Fernández was named the Rookie of the Month for the National League, leading all qualified rookie pitchers in ERA. He followed up his July by compiling a 1.15 ERA with 49 strikeouts in 39 innings pitched in August, which resulted him in receiving a second consecutive Rookie of the Month Award.

Fernández's rookie season was considered historic as his 4.2 Wins Above Replacement placed him in the Top 10 player seasons among those under 21 years old since 1900. Fernández's Adjusted ERA+ of 174 on the season also placed him in the Top 10 all-time for pitchers under the age of 21, and he became only the fourth pitcher to record this feat in the past century. His strikeout rate led the National League at 9.81 strikeouts per nine innings.

At the time after his last start of his rookie season, Fernández was in the top 10 of many pitching statistics in the National League, including sixth in strikeouts (187), first in strikeouts per nine innings (9.75) and hits allowed per nine innings (5.759), second in ERA (2.19) and Adjusted ERA+ (176), and third in WAR (6.3). Fernández won the Sporting News Rookie of the Year Award and the National League Rookie of the Year Award. He came in third place in the Cy Young Award voting behind Adam Wainwright and winner Clayton Kershaw.

==== 2014 season ====
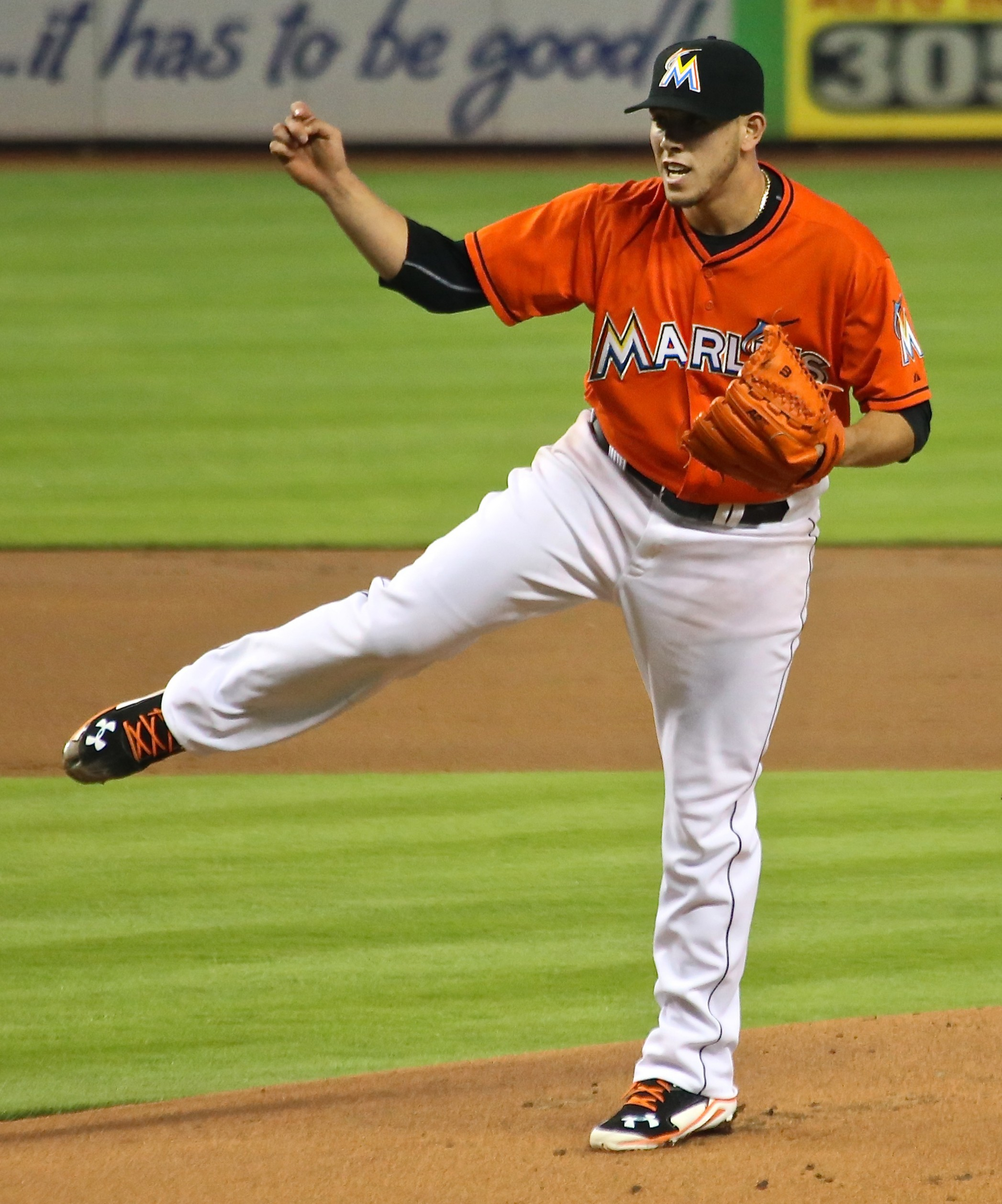
Fernández in 2014 with the Marlins

Fernández started his sophomore campaign as the Opening Day starter for the Marlins, making him the youngest Opening Day starting pitcher since Dwight Gooden in 1986. Fernández recorded nine strikeouts while walking none, and he joined Bob Gibson, Steve Carlton, Ferguson Jenkins, Walter Johnson, and Cy Young as the only pitchers to do so on Opening Day. On May 12, Fernández was placed on the 15-day disabled list due to a right elbow sprain. An MRI revealed that the elbow had a torn ulnar collateral ligament, which prematurely ended Fernández's 2014 season. He underwent Tommy John surgery on May 16. He made eight starts, going 4–2 with a 2.44 ERA and 70 strikeouts in 2014.

==== 2015 season ====
Fernández began the 2015 season on the 15-day disabled list but was later moved to the 60-day disabled list to continue recovery from Tommy John surgery. It was announced by the Marlins on June 15 that he would make his season debut on July 2. In his debut, Fernández recorded six strikeouts in six innings. He also hit a home run. Fernández returned to the disabled list in August with a biceps strain in his pitching arm. He returned to the mound in September and set a major league record for consecutive wins at home by a single pitcher with his seventeenth such win on the 25th of that month.

==== 2016 season ====
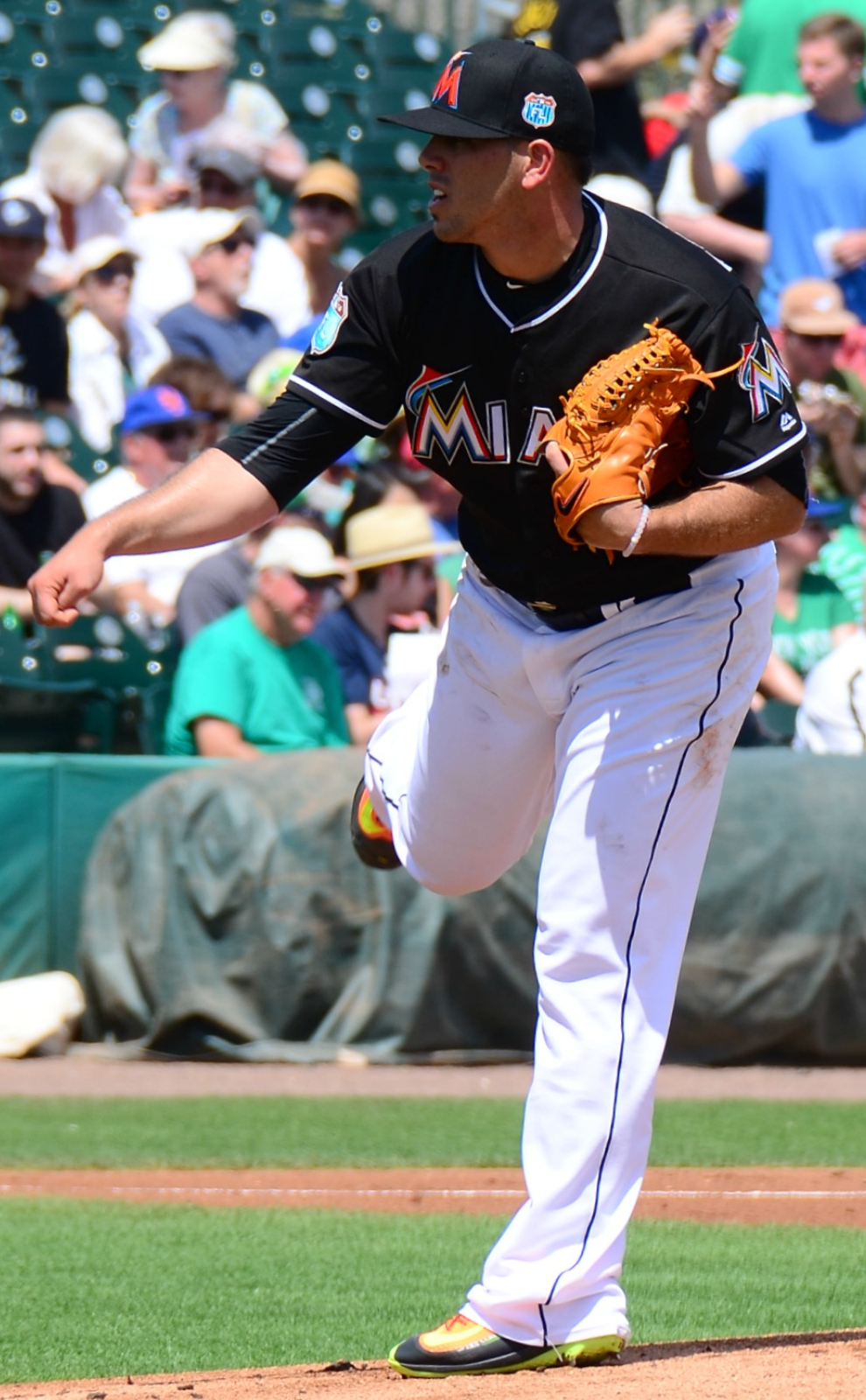
Fernández pitching for the Miami Marlins in spring training, 2016

To aid his recovery from Tommy John surgery, Fernández cut back on the use of his fastball during spring training in 2016 and began working on his secondary pitches. Appearing as a pinch hitter in the 12th inning against the Atlanta Braves on July 1, Fernández doubled in two runs to put the Marlins ahead 7–5, which ended up being the final score. He became just the second pitcher in Marlins history to produce a game-winning hit, following Dennis Cook on August 1, 1997. Fernández appeared in the 2016 MLB All-Star Game.

Fernández pitched his last game on September 20. He threw eight shutout innings in a 1–0 win against the division-leading Nationals, striking out 12 batters and allowing just three hits with no walks. Afterwards, Marlins infielder Martín Prado recalled that Fernández told a teammate it was "the best game he ever pitched".

He finished 2016 with an MLB-leading 12.49 strikeouts per nine innings and a new Marlins' season record of 253 strikeouts in 182 1/3 innings. He won 16 games, the best of his four-year career, while losing eight, with a 2.86 ERA. He had the highest line drive percentage allowed (28.0%) of all major league pitchers. He also had the lowest percentage of balls pulled against him (33.3%) among major league pitchers, and led major league pitchers in lowest contact percentage (67.5%). For his career, he had a 38–17 win–loss record for a .691 winning percentage and a 2.58 ERA.

== Pitching style ==
Fernández had four pitches in his repertoire: a four-seam fastball that averaged 94–97 miles per hour (151–156 km/h) and topped at 100.2 miles per hour (161.3 km/h), a slurve at 80–86 miles per hour (129–138 km/h), a changeup at 87–88 miles per hour (140–142 km/h), and an occasional sinker at 93–94 miles per hour (150–151 km/h).

== Personal life ==
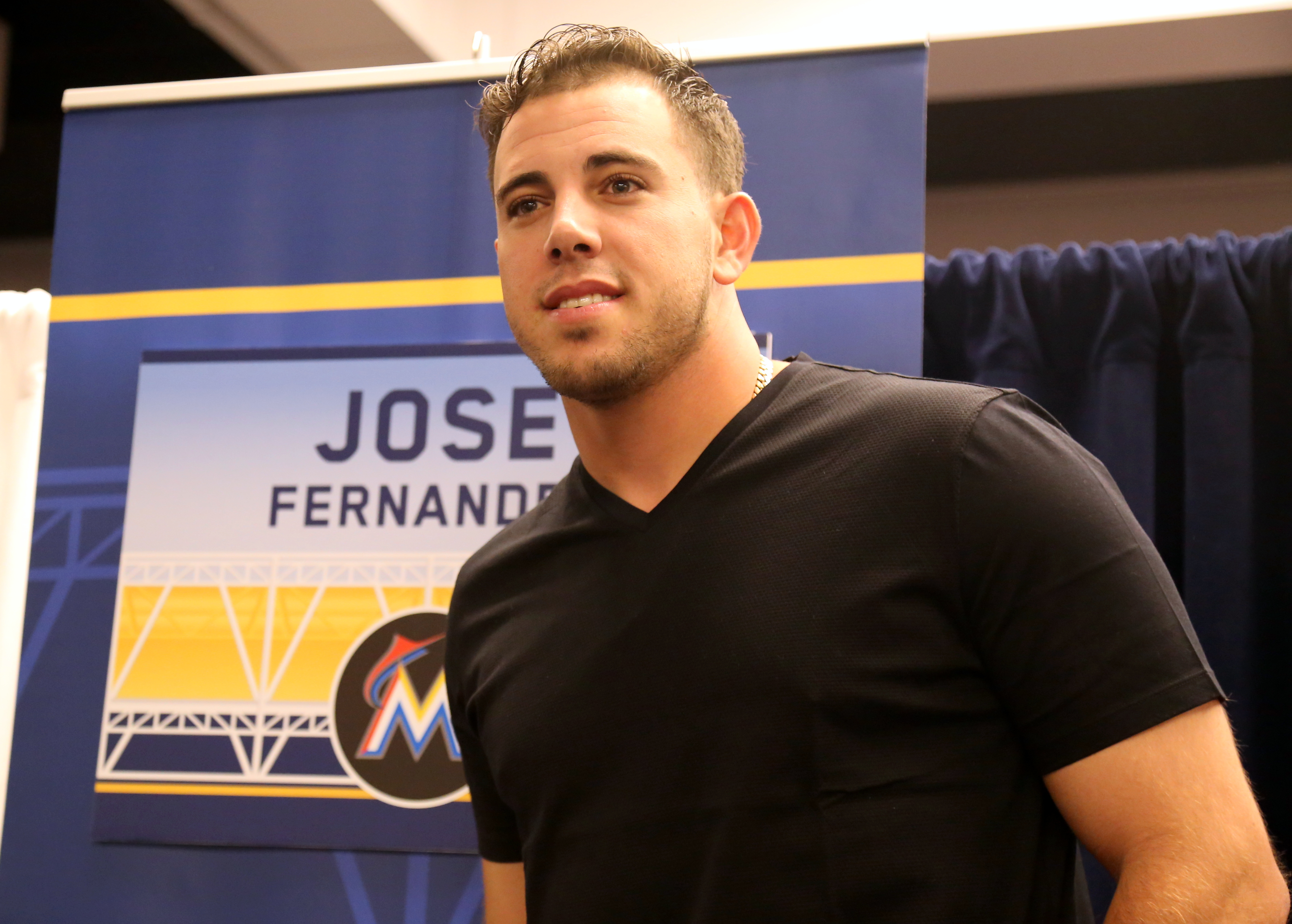
Fernández talks to reporters at the 2016 MLB All-Star Game

Fernández considered his grandmother, Olga, the "love of his life". After six years apart, Olga and José were reunited in Miami after the 2013 baseball season. Fernandez married Alejandra Baleato Marichal, his high school sweetheart, in December 2012 in Tampa, Florida. The couple divorced in 2014. On April 24, 2015, he became a citizen of the United States.

On September 20, 2016, five days prior to his death in a boating accident, Fernández announced that his girlfriend Maria Arias was pregnant with their child. Fernández's daughter was born in February 2017.

Fernández was good friends with teammate Dee Strange-Gordon. Strange-Gordon paid tribute to him on the day after his death by wearing Fernández's batting helmet and standing in the right-hand batter's box for the first pitch from Mets' starter Bartolo Colón. He then switched sides and hit a lead-off home run, which was his only home run of the year. After rounding the bases, Strange-Gordon wept as he pointed to the sky as a tribute to his deceased friend.

== Death ==
On September 25, 2016, Fernández died in a pre-dawn boating crash when the 32-foot (9.8 m) boat he was piloting was speeding at 56.48 knots (65 mph) and struck the Government Cut north rock jetty off Miami Beach, Florida. The U.S. Coast Guard found the boat, ꓘaught Looking, at about 3:00 a.m., overturned on the jetty near South Pointe Park, and found Fernandez and two other men, Eduardo Rivero and Emilio Jesus Macias, dead at the scene. A Florida Wildlife Commission (FWC) official confirmed that Fernández had died from the blunt impact of the crash. The commission received a toxicology report from the medical examiner of Miami-Dade County, but opted not to release the results. On October 28, 2016, ESPN obtained the autopsy and toxicology reports, which determined that Fernández had cocaine in his system and was under the influence of alcohol at the time of the crash.

The Marlins canceled their game against the Atlanta Braves on the day of his death. Teams around the major leagues honored Fernández, paying tribute with a league-wide moment of silence and the display of his jersey No. 16. The Miami Dolphins also observed a moment of silence before their Sunday football game against the Cleveland Browns. The next day, all players wore his jersey for the final time for that night's game, a 7–3 win over the New York Mets. The city of Miami and the Marlins held a public memorial and funeral procession for Fernández on September 28. His ashes were scattered at sea on October 2.

In a search warrant affidavit, Miami-Dade County authorities stated that a strong odor of alcohol was found on the three men who died in the crash, and evidence indicated that Fernández was speeding and driving with "recklessness" that was "exacerbated by the consumption of alcohol". In February 2017, the families of Eduardo Rivero and Emilio Jesus Macias sued Fernández's estate for $2 million each, claiming negligence and personal injury. The lawsuit was settled on July 31, 2018, for an undisclosed sum.

On March 16, 2017, the final investigative report on the incident confirmed that Fernández was piloting the boat at the time of the incident "in a reckless manner, at an extremely high rate of speed, in the darkness of night, in an area with known navigational hazards such as rock jetties and channel markers." The report concluded that he was legally drunk, having a blood alcohol content of 0.147%, nearly double the legal limit of 0.08%. Fernández also had cocaine in his system and was liable for multiple crimes, including involuntary manslaughter, boating under the influence, vessel homicide, and reckless or careless operation of a vessel. Fernández family attorney Ralph Fernandez (no relation to the deceased) challenged the findings of the final report, claiming that Fernández was framed as the boat pilot and that someone had spiked his drink with cocaine.

Prior to the investigative report, there had been talks about honoring Fernández with a statue, streets named after him, and plaques throughout the city. As of 2018, a plaque showing his jersey No. 16, years of birth and death, and a black ribbon is displayed outside of LoanDepot Park.

== See also ==
- List of baseball players who defected from Cuba
- List of baseball players who died during their careers
- List of Major League Baseball players from Cuba
- List of Miami Marlins team records
- Miami Marlins award winners and league leaders
