= Damien Magnifico =

American baseball player (born 1991)

- Pitcher
- Born: May 24, 1991 (age 35); Dallas, Texas, U.S.
- Batted: Right Threw: Right

MLB debut
- August 16, 2016, for the Milwaukee Brewers

Last MLB appearance
- June 3, 2017, for the Los Angeles Angels

MLB statistics
- Win–loss record: 0–0
- Earned run average: 5.40
- Strikeouts: 1
- Stats at Baseball Reference

Teams
- Milwaukee Brewers (2016); Los Angeles Angels (2017)

Damien Jack Magnifico (born May 24, 1991) is an American former professional baseball pitcher. He played in Major League Baseball (MLB) for the Los Angeles Angels and the Milwaukee Brewers.

== Career ==
Magnifico was drafted by the New York Mets in the fifth round of the 2009 Major League Baseball draft out of North Mesquite High School in Mesquite, Texas. He did not sign with the Mets and attended Howard College to play college baseball. Prior to the 2012 season, he transferred to the University of Oklahoma, where he played for the Oklahoma Sooners.

=== Milwaukee Brewers ===
After one year at Oklahoma, Magnifico was drafted by the Milwaukee Brewers in the fifth round of the 2012 Major League Baseball draft. He signed with the Brewers and made his professional debut with the Helena Brewers. He spent 2013 with the Wisconsin Timber Rattlers and Brevard County Manatees, 2014 with Brevard County and 2015 with the Biloxi Shuckers. The Brewers added him to their 40-man roster after the season.

Magnifico was promoted to the major leagues on August 16 and made his debut that day.

=== Baltimore Orioles ===
Magnifico was traded to the Baltimore Orioles on April 13, 2017. In five appearances for the Triple–A Norfolk Tides, he struggled to a 9.95 ERA with 5 strikeouts across 6 1/3 innings pitched. Magnifico was designated for assignment by the Orioles following the promotion of Francisco Peña on May 2.

=== Los Angeles Angels ===
On May 6, he was traded to the Los Angeles Angels for minor leaguer Jordan Kipper. On June 3, 2017, Magnifico was called up and made his Angels debut. The Angels outrighted him to the minor leagues in August.

=== Pittsburgh Pirates ===
On December 14, 2017, the Pittsburgh Pirates selected Magnifico from the Angels in the minor league phase of the Rule 5 draft. He was invited to spring training for the 2018 season but did not make the team. Magnifico made 42 appearances for the Triple–A Indianapolis Indians, logging a 3.57 ERA with 64 strikeouts across 70 2/3 innings of work. He elected free agency following the season on November 2, 2018.

=== Arizona Diamondbacks ===
On January 18, 2019, Magnifico signed a minor league deal with the Arizona Diamondbacks. Magnifico was released by the Diamondbacks organization on May 22, 2020.

On April 1, 2021, Magnifico announced his retirement from professional baseball via Twitter.

== See also ==
- Rule 5 draft results
