= Brian Ellington =

American baseball player (born 1990)

- Pitcher
- Born: August 4, 1990 (age 35); Gainesville, Florida, U.S.
- Batted: Right Threw: Right

MLB debut
- August 3, 2015, for the Miami Marlins

Last MLB appearance
- October 1, 2017, for the Miami Marlins

MLB statistics
- Win–loss record: 7–4
- Earned run average: 4.65
- Strikeouts: 98
- Stats at Baseball Reference

Teams
- Miami Marlins (2015–2017)
Medals
Men's baseball
Representing United States
Pan American Games
Silver medal – second place	2015 Toronto	Team

Brian Michael Ellington (born August 4, 1990) is an American former professional baseball pitcher. He has previously played in Major League Baseball (MLB) for the Miami Marlins. Listed at 6 feet 4 inches (1.93 m) and 195 pounds (88 kg), he throws and bats right-handed.

== Career ==
=== Amateur career ===
Ellington attended Oak Hall School in Gainesville, Florida. He had committed to attend Florida State University on a scholarship to play college baseball for the Florida State Seminoles. He underwent Tommy John surgery in September 2007, and decommitted from Florida State due to differences of opinion on how he should rehabilitate his arm after the surgery. He enrolled at Chipola College and transferred to Florida State College at Jacksonville, before finishing his collegiate career at the University of West Florida.

=== Miami Marlins ===
The Miami Marlins selected Ellington in the 16th round of the 2012 MLB draft. Ellington played for the Jupiter Hammerheads of the Class A-Advanced Florida State League in 2014. After the regular season, he was assigned to the Salt River Rafters Arizona Fall League (AFL), and appeared in the AFL Fall Stars Game.

In 2015, Ellington played for the Jacksonville Suns of the Double-A Southern League. The Marlins promoted Ellington to the major leagues on August 3, 2015. He made his major league debut that night. During the 2015 through 2017 seasons, Ellington appeared in 97 games with Miami, pitching to a record of 7–4 with a 4.65 earned run average (ERA) and 98 strikeouts in 102 2/3 innings pitched. Ellington was designated for assignment on April 1, 2018. He was released by the Marlins on April 6.

=== Arizona Diamondbacks ===
On April 20, 2018, Ellington signed a minor league deal with the Arizona Diamondbacks. After appearing in 15 minor league games, he was released on July 28, 2018. He became a free agent after the 2018 season.

=== Boston Red Sox ===
On February 1, 2019, Ellington signed a minor league contract with the Boston Red Sox. He began the seasons with the Double-A Portland Sea Dogs, and was promoted to the Triple-A Pawtucket Red Sox in early June. He was released on June 26, 2019.

=== Kansas City T-Bones ===
On July 3, 2019, Ellington signed with the Kansas City T-Bones of the American Association of Independent Professional Baseball. In 12 games of relief 15 innings he went 0-0 with a 0.60 era and 15 strikeouts.

=== Seattle Mariners ===
On July 31, 2019, Ellington's contract was purchased by the Seattle Mariners. In 10 games for the Triple–A Tacoma Rainiers, he struggled to a 7.20 ERA with 12 strikeouts across 10 innings of work. Ellington elected free agency following the season on November 4.

=== Kansas City Monarchs ===
On December 2, 2020, Ellington re-signed with the Kansas City T-Bones, who were later re-branded as the Kansas City Monarchs, of the American Association of Professional Baseball. In 27 bullpen appearances, Ellington posted a 3–4 record with a 4.33 ERA and 41 strikeouts.

=== Sioux City Explorers ===
On July 31, 2021, Ellington was claimed off waivers by the Sioux City Explorers of the American Association of Professional Baseball. On March 31, 2022, Ellington was released by the Explorers without ever appearing in a game for them.

== International career ==
Ellington was chosen to play for the United States national baseball team in the 2015 Pan American Games.
