= A. J. Ramos =

American baseball player (born 1986)

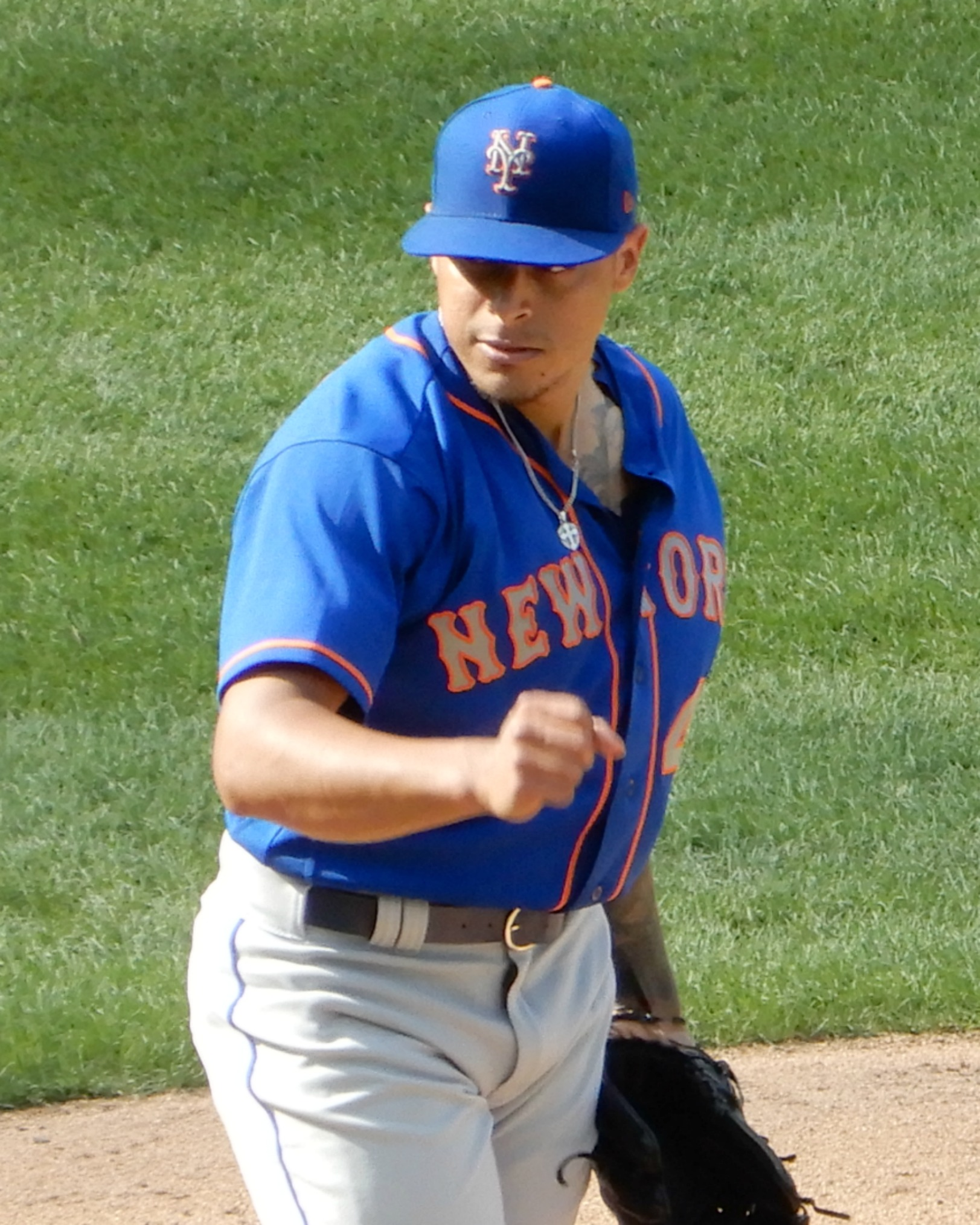
- Ramos with the New York Mets in 2017
- Pitcher
- Born: September 20, 1986 (age 40); Lubbock, Texas, U.S.
- Batted: Right Threw: Right

MLB debut
- September 4, 2012, for the Miami Marlins

Last MLB appearance
- October 3, 2021, for the Los Angeles Angels

MLB statistics
- Win–loss record: 17–18
- Earned run average: 3.04
- Strikeouts: 430
- Saves: 99
- Stats at Baseball Reference

Teams
- Miami Marlins (2012–2017); New York Mets (2017–2018); Colorado Rockies (2020); Los Angeles Angels (2021)

Career highlights and awards
- All-Star (2016)

Alejandro Ramos Jr. (born September 20, 1986) is an American former professional baseball pitcher. He played in Major League Baseball (MLB) for the Miami Marlins, New York Mets, Colorado Rockies, and Los Angeles Angels.

== Professional career ==
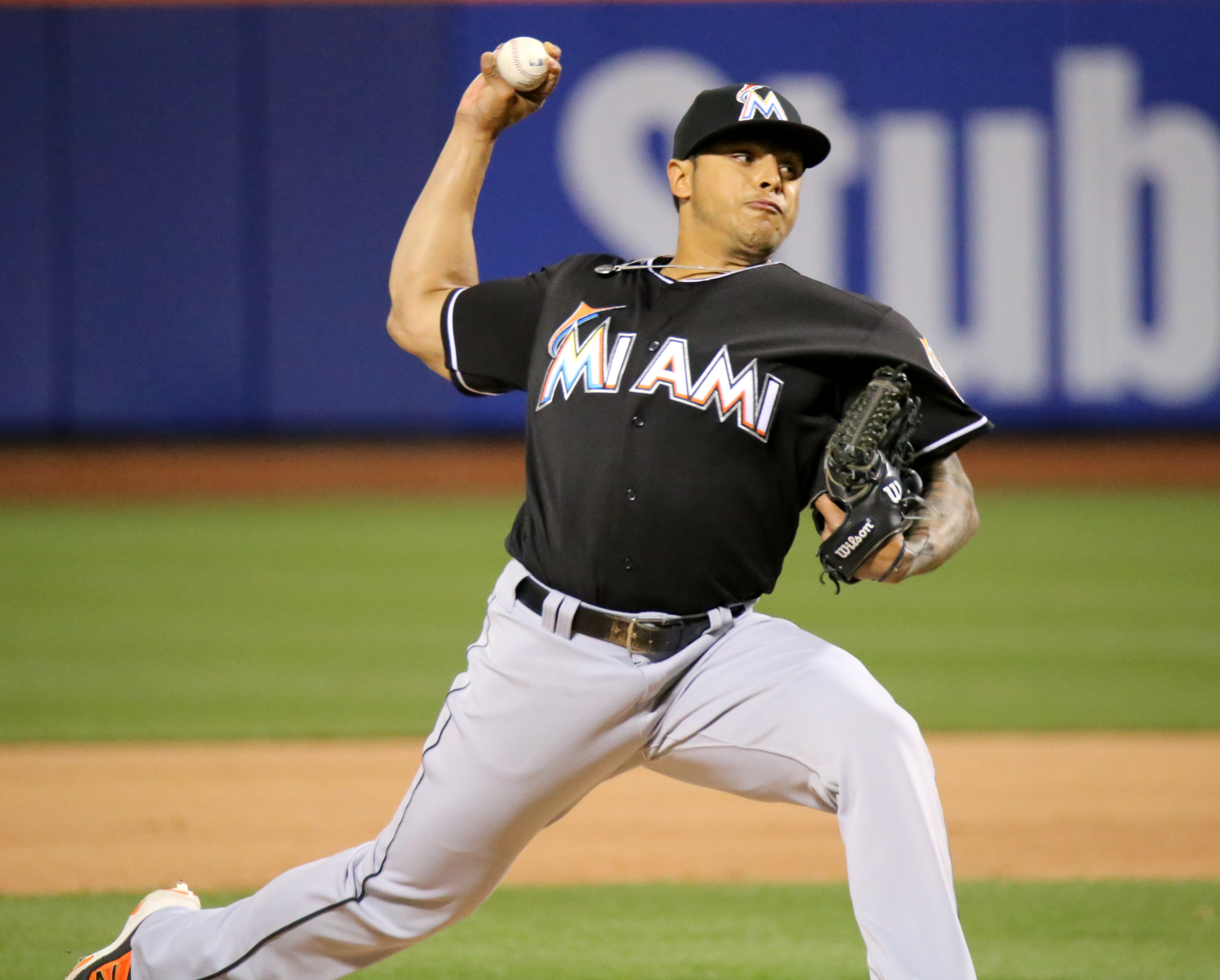
Ramos with the Marlins in 2016

Ramos attended Estacado High School in Lubbock, Texas. He then enrolled at Texas Tech University, where he played college baseball for the Texas Tech Red Raiders. In 2008, Ramos underwent Tommy John surgery.

=== Miami Marlins ===
The Florida Marlins selected Ramos in the 21st round, with the 638th overall selection, of the 2009 Major League Baseball draft. Ramos was called up to the majors for the first time on September 4, 2012. In 2014, Ramos had a 7–0 win–loss record with a 2.11 earned run average. Ramos became the Marlins' closing pitcher in 2015, due to the struggles of Steve Cishek. In 2016, Ramos successfully converted his first 24 save opportunities, setting a franchise record. He was named to appear in the 2016 MLB All-Star Game.

Ramos and the Marlins agreed on a $6.55 million salary for the 2017 season.

=== New York Mets ===
On July 28, 2017, Ramos was traded to the New York Mets in exchange for minor leaguers Merandy González and Ricardo Cespedes. In May 2018, Ramos suffered a shoulder strain that would keep him out for the rest of the season. He became a free agent on October 29, 2018.

=== Los Angeles Dodgers ===
In July 2020, Ramos announced he would be attempting a comeback to the major leagues. On July 2, Ramos signed a minor league deal with the Los Angeles Dodgers organization. He was released on August 28 without appearing in a game.

=== Chicago Cubs ===
On September 1, 2020, Ramos signed a minor league contract with the Chicago Cubs organization. He was released by the organization on September 3.

=== Colorado Rockies ===
On September 5, 2020, Ramos signed a minor league contract with the Colorado Rockies organization. On September 19, Ramos was selected to the major league roster, and made his first appearance in the majors since May 2018. He pitched in 3 games for Colorado, allowing 1 run in 2 2/3 innings. He became a free agent following the season.

=== Los Angeles Angels ===
On March 26, 2021, Ramos signed a minor league contract with the Los Angeles Angels organization. Ramos was assigned to the Triple-A Salt Lake Bees, making 42 appearances and working to a 5.26 ERA with 76 strikeouts in 53 innings of work. On September 23, Ramos' contract was selected by the Angels. In four major league appearances, Ramos gave up no runs while striking out three in 4 2/3 innings pitched.

On March 11, 2022, Ramos re-signed with the Angels on a minor league contract. On March 29, Ramos was diagnosed with a torn capsule in his right shoulder, ending his season before it began. He was released by the team on April 5. On April 6, Ramos announced his retirement from professional baseball via Twitter.

Ramos holds a unique record: among all players in MLB history with zero career plate appearances, he has the most games played (357).

== Personal life ==
Ramos is an ambassador for Up2Us Sports, a national non-profit organization dedicated to supporting underserved youth by providing them with coaches trained in positive youth development. He is of Mexican American descent.
