= Adam Conley =

American baseball player (born 1990)

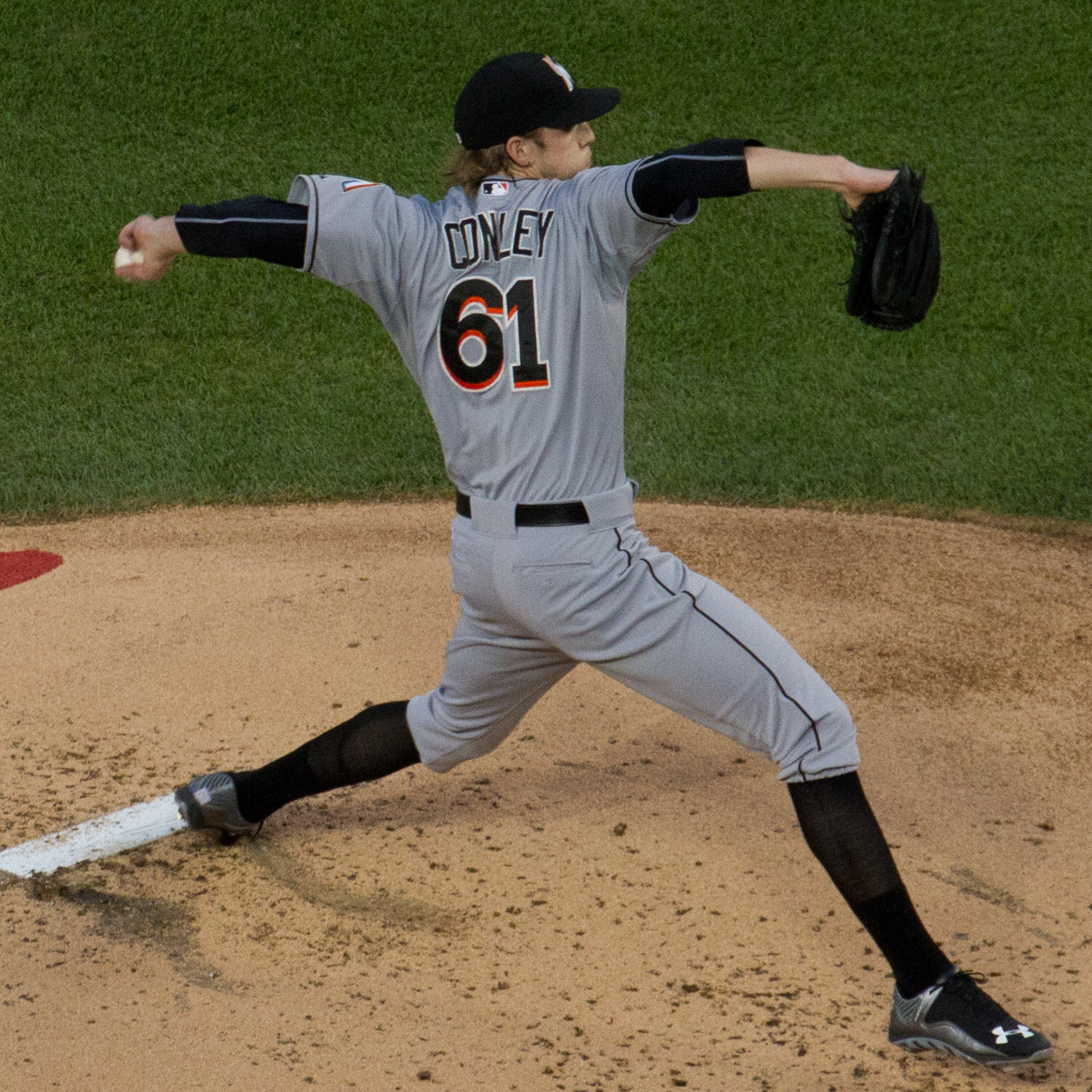
- Conley with the Miami Marlins
- Pitcher
- Born: May 24, 1990 (age 36); Redmond, Washington, U.S.
- Batted: Left Threw: Left

MLB debut
- June 10, 2015, for the Miami Marlins

Last MLB appearance
- September 22, 2021, for the Tampa Bay Rays

MLB statistics
- Win–loss record: 25–30
- Earned run average: 4.71
- Strikeouts: 374
- Stats at Baseball Reference

Teams
- Miami Marlins (2015–2019); Tampa Bay Rays (2021)

Adam Michael Conley (born May 24, 1990) is an American former professional baseball pitcher. He played in Major League Baseball (MLB) for the Miami Marlins from 2015 to 2019 and the Tampa Bay Rays in 2021.

== Career ==
=== Miami Marlins ===
Conley was drafted by the Minnesota Twins in the 32nd round of the 2008 Major League Baseball draft out of Olympia High School in Olympia, Washington. He did not sign with the organization, and instead attended Washington State University, choosing to major in Criminal Justice. He did not graduate. In 2011, as a junior, he went 6–7 with a 3.50 ERA in 16 starts. He was then drafted by the Florida Marlins in the second round of the 2011 Major League Baseball draft.

Conley made his professional debut for the Gulf Coast Marlins that year. He started the 2012 season with the Greensboro Grasshoppers and was promoted to the Jupiter Hammerheads during the season. He was then demoted to the AA Jacksonville Suns, for whom he played the 2013 season with. He started 2014 in Triple-A for the New Orleans Zephyrs.

Conley made his major league debut on June 10, 2015.

On April 29, 2016, Conley was pulled while pitching a no-hitter against the Milwaukee Brewers on the road with two outs in the eighth inning. The bullpen would go on to blow the no-hitter and the shutout in the ninth inning.

On July 3, 2016, Conley started the Fort Bragg Game, the first time an MLB game was played at an active military base. He pitched the bottom half of the first six innings, allowing no runs scored, and was the winning pitcher. On August 14, 2016, he was placed on the disabled list.

Conley was initially a promising starter in the Marlins’ rotation shortly after his major league debut during the 2015–16 season. Conley then ran into some struggles which proved to be career-damaging, such as several injuries, inconsistent and erratic play, and overall worsening statistics, amongst other issues. He then was moved to relief pitching, with some minor success in 2018. However, his play significantly worsened (6.53 ERA in 60 2/3 innings) over the 2019 season.

On August 30, 2020, Conley was designated for reassignment by the Marlins without making even a single appearance during the 2020 season. He was subsequently outrighted by the Marlins to Triple-A on September 6. Due to the cancellation of the minor league season because of the COVID-19 pandemic, this effectively ended Conley's season without him ever having thrown a single pitch. On September 28, the Marlins released him from the organization, and he subsequently became a free agent.

=== Tohoku Rakuten Golden Eagles ===
On December 12, 2020, Conley signed with the Tohoku Rakuten Golden Eagles of Nippon Professional Baseball for the 2021 season.

On May 3, 2021, Adam's wife, Kendall Mays Conley, made a statement on behalf of the family of his release from the Rakuten Golden Eagles due to Japan's border closures because of rising cases of COVID-19. At the time, only foreign professional athletes were allowed entrance into the country, but not their immediate family members. Conley was instructed by the organization to report to Japan for Spring Training alone, with his wife and children to follow once border restrictions lifted. Conley refused to relocate to Japan or report for Spring Training without his family for any period of time. His refusal to relocate without his family, coupled with Conley's and the organization's failure to reach a compromise, subsequently led to the Golden Eagles' cancellation of the contract, and the full release of Conley from their organization.

=== Tampa Bay Rays ===
On May 10, 2021, Conley signed a minor league contract with the Tampa Bay Rays, and was assigned to the Triple-A Durham Bulls. Conley logged a 4.35 ERA in 37 appearances for Durham. On August 14, 2021, the Rays selected Conley's contract. Conley would make 17 appearances out of the bullpen for Tampa Bay, posting a 2.29 ERA with 16 strikeouts in 19.2 innings pitched. On November 7, 2021, Conley was designated for assignment by the Rays after René Pinto was added to the 40-man roster. On November 10, Conley was released from the Rays organization.

On November 21, 2021, Conley's impending retirement was alluded to by his spouse. On March 11, 2022, Conley officially announced his retirement from professional baseball.

He now works as a private "baseball instructor".

== Personal life ==
Conley was born to his mother, Katy, and father, Larry, on May 24, 1990. He has an older brother, Jeremy. He attended Washington State University, majoring in Criminal Justice, but did not graduate. Conley met and proposed to college girlfriend Kendall Mays, a blogger, after a very brief courtship. Mays said she had only known him a short time before they became engaged on April 4, 2011. They were married on September 10, 2011, in Olympia, Washington. The couple have three daughters. They also are parents to an adopted nephew, who was born June 22, 2013. They homeschool their children, are advocates of home birth and midwifery and are against vaccination.

Adam is an outspoken follower of the Baptist Christian faith, and he and his wife are supporters of the United States Republican Party. He enjoys hunting for sport, shooting, and fishing. He is also an amateur pastor, and participates in bible study groups.
