= 2016 Pittsburgh Pirates season =

Major League Baseball season

2016 Pittsburgh Pirates
- League: National League
- Division: Central
- Ballpark: PNC Park
- City: Pittsburgh, Pennsylvania
- Record: 78–83–1 (.484)
- Divisional place: 3rd
- Owners: Bob Nutting
- General managers: Neal Huntington
- Managers: Clint Hurdle
- Television: Root Sports Pittsburgh
- Radio: KDKA-FM; Pittsburgh Pirates Radio Network (Steve Blass, Joe Block, Greg Brown, Bob Walk, John Wehner)
- Stats: ESPN.com; Baseball Reference

The 2016 Pittsburgh Pirates season was the franchise's 135th season overall, the 130th season as a member of the National League, and the 16th season at PNC Park. The regular season started with a win at home against the St. Louis Cardinals on April 3 and ended with a loss to the Cardinals at Busch Stadium on October 2. The Pirates finished the regular season third in the National League Central with 78 wins, 83 losses and one tie. For the first time since the 2012 season, the Pirates finished with a losing record and did not qualify for the postseason.

Two members of the 2016 Pirates were selected to represent the National League in the All-Star Game: pitcher Mark Melancon and outfielder Starling Marte. In addition, two players were named NL Player of the Week: infielder Jung-ho Kang and utility player Sean Rodriguez, both in September.

== Season standings ==
=== National League Central ===
NL Central
| Team | W | L | Pct. | GB | Home | Road |
|---|---|---|---|---|---|---|
| Chicago Cubs | 103 | 58 | .640 | — | 57‍–‍24 | 46‍–‍34 |
| St. Louis Cardinals | 86 | 76 | .531 | 17½ | 38‍–‍43 | 48‍–‍33 |
| Pittsburgh Pirates | 78 | 83 | .484 | 25 | 38‍–‍42 | 40‍–‍41 |
| Milwaukee Brewers | 73 | 89 | .451 | 30½ | 41‍–‍40 | 32‍–‍49 |
| Cincinnati Reds | 68 | 94 | .420 | 35½ | 38‍–‍43 | 30‍–‍51 |

=== National League playoff standings ===
Division leaders
| Team | W | L | Pct. |
|---|---|---|---|
| Chicago Cubs | 103 | 58 | .640 |
| Washington Nationals | 95 | 67 | .586 |
| Los Angeles Dodgers | 91 | 71 | .562 |

Wild Card teams (Top 2 teams qualify for postseason)
| Team | W | L | Pct. | GB |
|---|---|---|---|---|
| New York Mets | 87 | 75 | .537 | — |
| San Francisco Giants | 87 | 75 | .537 | — |
| St. Louis Cardinals | 86 | 76 | .531 | 1 |
| Miami Marlins | 79 | 82 | .491 | 7½ |
| Pittsburgh Pirates | 78 | 83 | .484 | 8½ |
| Colorado Rockies | 75 | 87 | .463 | 12 |
| Milwaukee Brewers | 73 | 89 | .451 | 14 |
| Philadelphia Phillies | 71 | 91 | .438 | 16 |
| Arizona Diamondbacks | 69 | 93 | .426 | 18 |
| Atlanta Braves | 68 | 93 | .422 | 18½ |
| San Diego Padres | 68 | 94 | .420 | 19 |
| Cincinnati Reds | 68 | 94 | .420 | 19 |

=== Record vs. opponents ===
2016 National League record Source: MLB Standings Grid – 2016
| Team | AZ | ATL | CHC | CIN | COL | LAD | MIA | MIL | NYM | PHI | PIT | SD | SF | STL | WSH | AL |
|---|---|---|---|---|---|---|---|---|---|---|---|---|---|---|---|---|
| Arizona | — | 5–2 | 2–5 | 3–3 | 10–9 | 7–12 | 2–4 | 3–4 | 5–1 | 4–3 | 1–5 | 10–9 | 6–13 | 4–3 | 2–5 | 5–15 |
| Atlanta | 2–5 | — | 3–3 | 3–4 | 1–6 | 1–5 | 11–7 | 2–5 | 10–9 | 11–8 | 3–4 | 4–2 | 3–4 | 2–4 | 4–15 | 8–12 |
| Chicago | 5–2 | 3–3 | — | 15–4 | 2–4 | 4–3 | 4–3 | 11–8 | 2–5 | 5–1 | 14–4 | 4–2 | 4–3 | 10–9 | 5–2 | 15–5 |
| Cincinnati | 3–3 | 4–3 | 4–15 | — | 5–2 | 2–5 | 3–4 | 11–8 | 0–6 | 4–2 | 9–10 | 3–4 | 3–3 | 9–10 | 3–4 | 5–15 |
| Colorado | 9–10 | 6–1 | 4–2 | 2–5 | — | 7–12 | 2–5 | 1–5 | 6–1 | 2–5 | 2–5 | 10–9 | 9–10 | 2–4 | 4–2 | 9–11 |
| Los Angeles | 12–7 | 5–1 | 3–4 | 5–2 | 12–7 | — | 1–6 | 5–2 | 4–3 | 4–2 | 2–5 | 11–8 | 8–11 | 4–2 | 5–1 | 10–10 |
| Miami | 4–2 | 7–11 | 3–4 | 4–3 | 5–2 | 6–1 | — | 4–2 | 7–12 | 9–10 | 6–1 | 3–3 | 2–4 | 4–3 | 9–10 | 6–14 |
| Milwaukee | 4–3 | 5–2 | 8–11 | 8–11 | 5–1 | 2–5 | 2–4 | — | 2–5 | 3–4 | 9–10 | 3–4 | 1–5 | 6–13 | 4–2 | 11–9 |
| New York | 1–5 | 9–10 | 5–2 | 6–0 | 1–6 | 3–4 | 12–7 | 5–2 | — | 12–7 | 3–3 | 4–3 | 4–3 | 3–3 | 7–12 | 12–8 |
| Philadelphia | 3–4 | 8–11 | 1–5 | 2–4 | 5–2 | 2–4 | 10–9 | 4–3 | 7–12 | — | 3–4 | 5–2 | 3–3 | 2–5 | 5–14 | 11–9 |
| Pittsburgh | 5–1 | 4–3 | 4–14 | 10–9 | 5–2 | 5–2 | 1–6 | 10–9 | 3–3 | 4–3 | — | 3–3 | 4–3 | 9–10 | 2–4 | 9–11 |
| San Diego | 9–10 | 2–4 | 2–4 | 4–3 | 9–10 | 8–11 | 3–3 | 4–3 | 3–4 | 2–5 | 3–3 | — | 8–11 | 1–6 | 4–3 | 6–14 |
| San Francisco | 13–6 | 4–3 | 3–4 | 3–3 | 10–9 | 11–8 | 4–2 | 5–1 | 3–4 | 3–3 | 3–4 | 11–8 | — | 3–4 | 3–4 | 8–12 |
| St. Louis | 3–4 | 4–2 | 9–10 | 10–9 | 4–2 | 2–4 | 3–4 | 13–6 | 3–3 | 5–2 | 10–9 | 6–1 | 4–3 | — | 2–5 | 8–12 |
| Washington | 5–2 | 15–4 | 2–5 | 4–3 | 2–4 | 1–5 | 10–9 | 2–4 | 12–7 | 14–5 | 4–2 | 3–4 | 4–3 | 5–2 | — | 12–8 |

=== Detailed records ===
National League
| Opponent | W | L | WP | RS | RA |
NL East
| Atlanta Braves | 4 | 3 | 0.571 | 40 | 35 |
| Miami Marlins | 1 | 6 | 0.143 | 24 | 22 |
| New York Mets | 3 | 3 | 0.500 | 21 | 25 |
| Philadelphia Phillies | 4 | 3 | 0.571 | 36 | 29 |
| Washington Nationals | 2 | 4 | 0.333 | 17 | 33 |
| Total | 14 | 19 | 0.424 | 138 | 144 |
NL Central
| Chicago Cubs | 4 | 14 | 0.222 | 73 | 114 |
| Cincinnati Reds | 10 | 9 | 0.526 | 84 | 81 |
| Milwaukee Brewers | 10 | 9 | 0.526 | 72 | 74 |
| Pittsburgh Pirates | | | | | |
| St. Louis Cardinals | 9 | 10 | 0.474 | 81 | 101 |
| Total | 33 | 42 | 0.440 | 310 | 370 |
NL West
| Arizona Diamondbacks | 5 | 1 | 0.833 | 46 | 32 |
| Colorado Rockies | 5 | 2 | 0.714 | 38 | 33 |
| Los Angeles Dodgers | 5 | 2 | 0.714 | 42 | 27 |
| San Diego Padres | 3 | 3 | 0.500 | 27 | 22 |
| San Francisco Giants | 4 | 3 | 0.571 | 32 | 40 |
| Total | 22 | 11 | 0.667 | 185 | 154 |
American League
| Detroit Tigers | 1 | 3 | 0.250 | 16 | 26 |
| Houston Astros | 1 | 2 | 0.333 | 12 | 9 |
| Los Angeles Angels of Anaheim | 1 | 2 | 0.333 | 14 | 21 |
| Oakland Athletics | 3 | 0 | 1.000 | 17 | 8 |
| Seattle Mariners | 2 | 2 | 0.500 | 24 | 14 |
| Texas Rangers | 1 | 2 | 0.333 | 13 | 12 |
| Total | 9 | 11 | 0.450 | 96 | 90 |
| Season Total | 78 | 83 | 0.484 | 729 | 758 |

| Month | Games | Won | Lost | Win % | RS | RA |
|---|---|---|---|---|---|---|
| April | 24 | 15 | 9 | 0.625 | 128 | 109 |
| May | 27 | 14 | 13 | 0.519 | 130 | 115 |
| June | 28 | 9 | 19 | 0.321 | 106 | 154 |
| July | 24 | 14 | 10 | 0.583 | 107 | 96 |
| August | 28 | 15 | 13 | 0.536 | 122 | 111 |
| September | 28 | 11 | 17 | 0.393 | 129 | 159 |
| October | 2 | 0 | 2 | 0.000 | 7 | 14 |
| Total | 161 | 78 | 83 | 0.484 | 729 | 758 |

| | Games | Won | Lost | Tie | Win % | RS | RA | | | | | | | |
| Home | 81 | 38 | 42 | 1 | 0.475 | 359 | 387 | Away | 81 GP | 40 W | 41 L | 0.494 | RS 370 | RA 371 |
| Total | 161 | 78 | 83 | 0.484 | 729 | 758 | | | | | | | | |

== Regular season ==
=== April ===
- **April 3** – The Pirates defeat the St. Louis Cardinals in the very first game of the 2016 Major League Baseball season
- **April 6** – The Pirates sweep the Cardinals in the first series of the regular season.
- The Pirates finish the month with a win–loss record of 15–9, second in the NL Central at 3.0 games out of first.

=== May ===
- **May 6** – Third baseman/Shortstop Jung-ho Kang returns from a 2015 season-ending injury to make his 2016 season debut, hitting two home runs in a 4–2 win over the St. Louis Cardinals.
- **May 20** – Andrew McCutchen records his 613th career hit at PNC Park, surpassing Jack Wilson as PNC Park hits leader.
- **May 23** – Starting pitcher Ryan Vogelsong is hit by a pitch while batting. Reliever Wilfredo Boscán takes his place four days after his MLB debut and records his first career MLB win and hit.
- **May 26** – The Pirates conclude a ten-game homestand, winning eight and taking three series in a row against the Atlanta Braves, Colorado Rockies and Arizona Diamondbacks.
- **May 30** – Pitcher Jeff Locke pitches the first complete game shutout of his career, in 105 pitches, in a 10–0 victory against the Miami Marlins. Outfielder Gregory Polanco hits the first grand slam of his career.
- The Pirates finish the month with a win–loss record of 29–22, second in the NL Central at 6.5 games out of first.

=== June ===
- **June 7** – After rain forces the first game in a homestand against the New York Mets on June 6 to be postponed, the Pirates sweep a double-header against the Mets. Closing pitcher Mark Melancon records a save in both games.
- **June 8** – Starting pitcher Jameson Taillon makes his MLB debut against the New York Mets, striking out three and allowing three runs in six innings in a loss to the Mets.
- **June 14** – Jameson Taillon earns his first career MLB win in a shutout victory over the New York Mets.
- **June 17** – The Pirates are shut out for the first time in the 2016 season in a loss against the Chicago Cubs.
- **June 24** – Clint Hurdle earns his 1000th career win as a manager in a Pirates victory at home over the Los Angeles Dodgers.
- The Pirates finish the month with a win–loss record of 38–41, third in the NL Central at 14.0 games out of first.

=== July ===
- **July 4** – Juan Nicasio becomes only the 74th player to pitch an immaculate inning in a Major League game.
- **July 5** – Mark Melancon (P) is named to the National League All-Star team, while Starling Marte (LF) is named a final vote candidate.
- **July 7** – Starting pitcher Tyler Glasnow makes his MLB debut, striking out five and allowing four runs in a loss against the St. Louis Cardinals.
- **July 10** – The Pirates enter the All-Star break with a win–loss record of 46–43, third in the NL Central.
- **July 17** – The Pirates defeat the Washington Nationals 2–1 in 18 innings, the longest regular season game in Nationals history, on the strength of a Starling Marte home run.
- **July 27** – Pitcher Gerrit Cole pitches the first complete game of his career, in 93 pitches, in a 10–1 victory against the Seattle Mariners.
- **July 30** – The Pirates trade closing pitcher Mark Melancon to the Washington Nationals for Felipe Rivero and Taylor Hearn; Tony Watson replaces Melancon as closer.
- The Pirates finish the month with a win–loss record of 52–51, third in the NL Central at 10.5 games out of first.

=== August ===
- The Pirates finish the month with a win–loss record of 67–64, third in the NL Central at 17.5 games out of first.

=== September ===
- **September 12** – Jung-ho Kang is named NL Player of the Week for the week ending September 11.
- **September 19** – Sean Rodriguez is named NL co-Player of the Week for the week ending September 18.
- **September 27** – The Pirates lose to the Chicago Cubs and are prevented from qualifying for the postseason for the first time since 2012.
- **September 29** – The Pirates and the Cubs tie, 1–1, after the game was called in the 6th inning because of inclement weather. The game was not made up as the result did not impact the playoff race. It was the first tie in MLB since June 2005.
- **September 30** – The Pirates lose for the 81st time of the season, against the Cardinals, ensuring the team's first losing season since 2012.
- The Pirates finish the month with a win–loss record of 78–81, third in the NL Central at 24.0 games out of first.

=== October ===
- **October 2** – At the conclusion of the season, the Pirates had a win–loss record of 78–83, finishing third in the NL Central behind the St. Louis Cardinals and the Chicago Cubs.

=== Game log ===
2016 Game Log: 78–83 (Home: 38–42-1Away: 40–41)
April: 15–9 (Home: 7–3; Away: 8–6)

| # | Date | Opponent | Score | Win | Loss | Save | Attendance | Record | Streak |
|---|---|---|---|---|---|---|---|---|---|
| 1 | April 3 | Cardinals | 4–1 | **Liriano** (1–0) | Wainwright (0–1) | — | 39,500 | 1–0 | W1 |
| 2 | April 5 | Cardinals | 6–5 (11) | **Lobstein** (1–0) | Maness (0–1) | — | 26,049 | 2–0 | W2 |
| 3 | April 6 | Cardinals | 5–1 | **Nicasio** (1–0) | Leake (0–1) | **Melancon** (1) | 14,890 | 3–0 | W3 |
| 4 | April 8 | @ Reds | 6–5 | **Vogelsong** (1–0) | Hoover (0–1) | **Melancon** (2) | 17,194 | 4–0 | W4 |
| 5 | April 9 | @ Reds | 1–5 | Iglesias (1–0) | **Cole** (0–1) | — | 22,799 | 4–1 | L1 |
| 6 | April 10 | @ Reds | 1–2 | Ohlendorf (2–0) | **Caminero** (0–1) | — | 27,207 | 4–2 | L2 |
| 7 | April 11 | @ Tigers | 7–4 | **Niese** (1–0) | Verlander (0–1) | **Melancon** (3) | 26,271 | 5–2 | W1 |
| 8 | April 12 | @ Tigers | 2–8 | Sánchez (2–0) | **Nicasio** (1–1) | — | 26,489 | 5–3 | L1 |
| 9 | April 13 | Tigers | 3–7 | Greene (1–0) | **Caminero** (0–2) | — | 21,175 | 5–4 | L2 |
| 10 | April 14 | Tigers | 4–7 | Zimmermann (2–0) | **Cole** (0–2) | Rodríguez (2) | 18,751 | 5–5 | L3 |
| 11 | April 15 | Brewers | 4–8 | Nelson (2–1) | **Locke** (0–1) | — | 24,280 | 5–6 | L4 |
| 12 | April 16 | Brewers | 5–0 | **Niese** (2–0) | Jungmann (0–2) | — | 34,957 | 6–6 | W1 |
| 13 | April 17 | Brewers | 9–3 | **Nicasio** (2–1) | Davies (0–1) | — | 31,124 | 7–6 | W2 |
| 14 | April 19 | @ Padres | 4–5 | Rea (1–1) | **Liriano** (1–1) | Rodney (2) | 19,449 | 7–7 | L1 |
| 15 | April 20 | @ Padres | 2–8 | Pomeranz (2–1) | **Locke** (0–2) | — | 20,681 | 7–8 | L2 |
| 16 | April 21 | @ Padres | 11–1 | **Cole** (1–2) | Shields (0–3) | — | 20,387 | 8–8 | W1 |
| 17 | April 22 | @ Diamondbacks | 8–7 | **Niese** (3–0) | Corbin (1–2) | **Melancon** (4) | 27,829 | 9–8 | W2 |
| 18 | April 23 | @ Diamondbacks | 1–7 | De La Rosa (2–3) | **Nicasio** (2–2) | — | 32,935 | 9–9 | L1 |
| 19 | April 24 | @ Diamondbacks | 12–10 (13) | **Feliz** (1–0) | Marshall (0–1) | **Caminero** (1) | 27,573 | 10–9 | W1 |
| 20 | April 25 | @ Rockies | 6–1 | **Locke** (1–2) | Bettis (2–1) | **Schugel** (1) | 20,674 | 11–9 | W2 |
| 21 | April 26 | @ Rockies | 9–4 | **Cole** (2–2) | De La Rosa (1–3) | — | 20,227 | 12–9 | W3 |
| 22 | April 27 | @ Rockies | 9–8 (12) | **Lobstein** (2–0) | Estévez (0–1) | **Melancon** (5) | 21,345 | 13–9 | W4 |
| — | April 28 | @ Rockies | PPD, RAIN/SNOW; rescheduled for June 9 | | | | | | |
| 23 | April 29 | Reds | 4–1 | **Nicasio** (3–2) | Straily (0–1) | **Melancon** (6) | 29,938 | 14–9 | W5 |
| 24 | April 30 | Reds | 5–1 | **Liriano** (2–1) | Simón (0–3) | **Melancon** (7) | 34,810 | 15–9 | W6 |

May: 14–13 (Home: 8–6; Away: 6–7)

| # | Date | Opponent | Score | Win | Loss | Save | Attendance | Record | Streak |
|---|---|---|---|---|---|---|---|---|---|
| 25 | May 1 | Reds | 5–6 (11) | Wood (3–0) | **Vogelsong** (1–1) | — | 28,755 | 15–10 | L1 |
| 26 | May 2 | Cubs | 2–7 | Hammel (4–0) | **Cole** (2–3) | — | 18,376 | 15–11 | L2 |
| 27 | May 3 | Cubs | 1–7 | Arrieta (6–0) | **Niese** (3–1) | — | 22,195 | 15–12 | L3 |
| 28 | May 4 | Cubs | 2–6 | Lester (3–1) | **Nicasio** (3–3) | — | 28,782 | 15–13 | L4 |
| 29 | May 6 | @ Cardinals | 4–2 | **Liriano** (3–1) | Martínez (4–2) | **Melancon** (8) | 43,093 | 16–13 | W1 |
| 30 | May 7 | @ Cardinals | 4–6 | Rosenthal (1–1) | **Schugel** (0–1) | — | 42,338 | 16–14 | L1 |
| 31 | May 8 | @ Cardinals | 10–5 | **Cole** (3–3) | Wacha (2–3) | **Melancon** (9) | 42,441 | 17–14 | W1 |
| 32 | May 9 | @ Reds | 2–3 | Ramirez (1–2) | **Niese** (3–2) | Cingrani (2) | 12,103 | 17–15 | L1 |
| — | May 10 | @ Reds | PPD, RAIN; rescheduled for September 17 | | | | | | |
| 33 | May 11 | @ Reds | 5–4 | **Watson** (1–0) | Ohlendorf (3–4) | **Melancon** (10) | 14,694 | 18–15 | W1 |
| 34 | May 13 | @ Cubs | 4–9 | Hammel (5–0) | **Liriano** (3–2) | — | 37,479 | 18–16 | L1 |
| 35 | May 14 | @ Cubs | 2–8 | Arrieta (7–0) | **Locke** (1–3) | — | 40,953 | 18–17 | L2 |
| 36 | May 15 | @ Cubs | 2–1 | **Cole** (4–3) | Lester (4–2) | **Melancon** (11) | 40,814 | 19–17 | W1 |
| 37 | May 16 | Braves | 8–5 | **Niese** (4–2) | Pérez (1–1) | **Melancon** (12) | 16,905 | 20–17 | W2 |
| 38 | May 17 | Braves | 12–9 | **Nicasio** (4–3) | Blair (0–3) | **Melancon** (13) | 19,400 | 21–17 | W3 |
| 39 | May 18 | Braves | 1–3 | Teherán (1–4) | **Liriano** (3–3) | Vizcaíno (4) | 18,201 | 21–18 | L1 |
| 40 | May 19 | Braves | 8–2 | **Locke** (2–3) | Foltynewicz (1–2) | — | 23,074 | 22–18 | W1 |
| 41 | May 20 | Rockies | 2–1 | **Cole** (5–3) | Butler (2–2) | **Melancon** (14) | 23,248 | 23–18 | W2 |
| 42 | May 21 | Rockies | 1–5 | Estevez (1–1) | **Melancon** (0–1) | — | 31,352 | 23–19 | L1 |
| — | May 22 | Rockies | PPD, RAIN; rescheduled for May 23 | | | | | | |
| 43 | May 23 | Rockies | 6–3 | **Boscán** (1–0) | Lyles (1–2) | **Melancon** (15) | 34,529 | 24–19 | W1 |
| 44 | May 24 | Diamondbacks | 12–1 | **Liriano** (4–3) | Miller (1–6) | — | 18,415 | 25–19 | W2 |
| 45 | May 25 | Diamondbacks | 5–4 | **Locke** (3–3) | De La Rosa (4–5) | **Melancon** (16) | 20,696 | 26–19 | W3 |
| 46 | May 26 | Diamondbacks | 8–3 | **Schugel** (1–1) | Corbin (2–4) | — | 30,861 | 27–19 | W4 |
| 47 | May 27 | @ Rangers | 9–1 | **Niese** (5–2) | Hamels (5–1) | — | 37,645 | 28–19 | W5 |
| 48 | May 28 | @ Rangers | 2–5 | Darvish (1–0) | **Nicasio** (4–4) | — | 46,950 | 28–20 | L1 |
| 49 | May 29 | @ Rangers | 2–6 | Perez (3–4) | **Liriano** (4–4) | — | 44,613 | 28–21 | L2 |
| 50 | May 30 | @ Marlins | 10–0 | **Locke** (4–3) | Nicolino (2–3) | — | 10,856 | 29–21 | W1 |
| 51 | May 31 | @ Marlins | 1–3 | Fernandez (8–2) | **Cole** (5–4) | Ramos (16) | 10,637 | 29–22 | L1 |

June: 9–19 (Home: 7–10; Away: 2–9)

| # | Date | Opponent | Score | Win | Loss | Save | Attendance | Record | Streak |
|---|---|---|---|---|---|---|---|---|---|
| 52 | June 1 | @ Marlins | 2–3 | Phelps (4–3) | **Watson** (1–1) | Ramos (17) | 17,018 | 29–23 | L2 |
| 53 | June 2 | @ Marlins | 3–4 (12) | Wittgren (1–0) | **Schugel** (1–2) | — | 19,907 | 29–24 | L3 |
| 54 | June 3 | Angels | 2–9 | Weaver (5–4) | **Liriano** (4–5) | — | 27,643 | 29–25 | L4 |
| 55 | June 4 | Angels | 8–7 | **Locke** (5–3) | Salas (2–2) | **Melancon** (17) | 31,505 | 30–25 | W1 |
| 56 | June 5 | Angels | 4–5 | Guerra (1–0) | **Watson** (1–2) | Street (6) | 27,754 | 30–26 | L1 |
| — | June 6 | Mets | PPD, RAIN; rescheduled for June 7 | | | | | | |
| 57 | June 7 | Mets | 3–1 | **Niese** (6–2) | Matz (7–2) | **Melancon** (18) | N/A | 31–26 | W1 |
| 58 | June 7 | Mets | 3–1 | **Nicasio** (5–4) | deGrom (3–2) | **Melancon** (19) | 26,605 | 32–26 | W2 |
| 59 | June 8 | Mets | 5–6 | Reed (1–0) | **Luebke** (0–1) | Familia (19) | 28,084 | 32–27 | L1 |
| 60 | June 9 | @ Rockies | 5–11 | De La Rosa (2–4) | **Locke** (5–4) | — | 24,678 | 32–28 | L2 |
| 61 | June 10 | Cardinals | 3–9 (12) | Broxton (1–0) | **Nicasio** (5–5) | — | 28,417 | 32–29 | L3 |
| 62 | June 11 | Cardinals | 1–5 | Martinez (7–5) | **Liriano** (4–6) | Rosenthal (12) | 36,962 | 32–30 | L4 |
| 63 | June 12 | Cardinals | 3–8 | Leake (5–4) | **Niese** (6–3) | — | 31,148 | 32–31 | L5 |
| 64 | June 14 | @ Mets | 4–0 | **Taillon** (1–0) | deGrom (3–3) | — | 35,124 | 33–31 | W1 |
| 65 | June 15 | @ Mets | 2–11 | Syndergaard (7–2) | **Locke** (5–5) | — | 32,117 | 33–32 | L1 |
| 66 | June 16 | @ Mets | 4–6 | Colón (6–3) | **Nicasio** (5–6) | Familia (22) | 33,052 | 33–33 | L2 |
| 67 | June 17 | @ Cubs | 0–6 | Arrieta (11–1) | **Liriano** (4–7) | — | 41,547 | 33–34 | L3 |
| 68 | June 18 | @ Cubs | 3–4 | Lester (9–3) | **Niese** (6–4) | Rondon (12) | 41,424 | 33–35 | L4 |
| 69 | June 19 | @ Cubs | 5–10 | Hendricks (5–6) | **Taillon** (1–1) | — | 41,024 | 33–36 | L5 |
| 70 | June 20 | Giants | 1–0 | **Locke** (6–5) | Bumgarner (8–3) | **Melancon** (20) | 27,906 | 34–36 | W1 |
| 71 | June 21 | Giants | 4–15 | Cueto (11–1) | **Boscán** (1–1) | — | 27,729 | 34–37 | L1 |
| 72 | June 22 | Giants | 6–7 | Law (3–1) | **Hughes** (0–1) | Casilla (15) | 33,747 | 34–38 | L2 |
| 73 | June 23 | Giants | 3–5 | Suarez (3–1) | **Niese** (6–5) | Casilla (16) | 29,986 | 34–39 | L3 |
| 74 | June 24 | Dodgers | 8–6 | **Feliz** (2–0) | Tepesch (0–1) | **Melancon** (21) | 28,226 | 35–39 | W1 |
| 75 | June 25 | Dodgers | 6–1 | **Locke** (7–5) | Maeda (6–5) | — | 33,590 | 36–39 | W2 |
| 76 | June 26 | Dodgers | 4–3 | **Kuhl** (1–0) | Kershaw (11–2) | **Melancon** (22) | | 37–39 | W3 |
| 77 | June 27 | Dodgers | 4–5 | Kazmir (6–3) | **Liriano** (4–8) | Jansen (22) | 26,925 | 37–40 | L1 |
| 78 | June 28 | @ Mariners | 2–5 | Iwakuma (7–6) | **Niese** (6–6) | Cishek (18) | 24,836 | 37–41 | L2 |
| 79 | June 29 | @ Mariners | 8–1 | **Taillon** (2–1) | Miley (6–4) | — | 25,477 | 38–41 | W1 |

July: 14–10 (Home: 7–4; Away: 7–6)

| # | Date | Opponent | Score | Win | Loss | Save | Attendance | Record | Streak |
|---|---|---|---|---|---|---|---|---|---|
| 80 | July 1 | @ Athletics | 7–3 | **Locke** (8–5) | Gray (3–7) | — | 15,710 | 39–41 | W2 |
| 81 | July 2 | @ Athletics | 4–2 | **Nicasio** (6–6) | Coulombe (1–1) | **Melancon** (23) | 28,846 | 40–41 | W3 |
| 82 | July 3 | @ Athletics | 6–3 | **Liriano** (5–8) | Mengden (1–4) | **Melancon** (24) | 21,831 | 41–41 | W4 |
| 83 | July 4 | @ Cardinals | 4–2 | **Niese** (7–6) | Martinez (7–6) | **Feliz** (1) | 41,850 | 42–41 | W5 |
| 84 | July 5 | @ Cardinals | 5–2 | **Nicasio** (7–6) | Leake (5–7) | **Melancon** (25) | 41,444 | 43–41 | W6 |
| 85 | July 6 | @ Cardinals | 7–5 | **Schugel** (2–2) | Broxton (1–1) | **Melancon** (26) | 42,693 | 44–41 | W7 |
| 86 | July 7 | @ Cardinals | 1–5 | Wainwright (8–5) | **Glasnow** (0–1) | — | 42,144 | 44–42 | L1 |
| 87 | July 8 | Cubs | 8–4 | **Feliz** (3–0) | Arrieta (12–4) | **Melancon** (27) | 35,904 | 45–42 | W1 |
| 88 | July 9 | Cubs | 12–6 | **Caminero** (1–2) | Warren (3–2) | **Hughes** (1) | 37,796 | 46–42 | W2 |
| 89 | July 10 | Cubs | 5–6 | Strop (2–2) | **Watson** (1–3) | Rondon (14) | 37,998 | 46–43 | L1 |
**87th All-Star Game in San Diego, California**
| 90 | July 15 | @ Nationals | 1–5 | Strasburg (13–0) | **Liriano** (5–9) | — | 36,982 | 46–44 | L2 |
| 91 | July 16 | @ Nationals | 0–6 | Roark (9–5) | **Cole** (5–5) | — | 38,861 | 46–45 | L3 |
| 92 | July 17 | @ Nationals | 2–1 (18) | **Niese** (8–6) | Pérez (2–3) | — | 32,755 | 47–45 | W1 |
| 93 | July 19 | Brewers | 3–2 | **Melancon** (1–1) | Thornburg (3–4) | — | 27,106 | 48–45 | W2 |
| 94 | July 20 | Brewers | 5–9 | Torres (2–1) | **Locke** (8–6) | — | 36,717 | 48–46 | L1 |
| 95 | July 21 | Brewers | 5–3 | **Liriano** (6–9) | Garza (1–4) | **Melancon** (28) | 35,978 | 49–46 | W1 |
| 96 | July 22 | Phillies | 0–4 | Eflin (3–3) | **Cole** (5–6) | — | 33,703 | 49–47 | L1 |
| 97 | July 23 | Phillies | 7–4 | **Nicasio** (8–6) | Nola (5–9) | **Melancon** (29) | 35,802 | 50–47 | W1 |
| 98 | July 24 | Phillies | 5–4 | **Feliz** (4–0) | Ramos (1–1) | **Melancon** (30) | 32,439 | 51–47 | W2 |
| 99 | July 26 | Mariners | 4–7 | Hernandez (5–4) | **Liriano** (6–10) | Cishek (14) | 30,969 | 51–48 | L1 |
| 100 | July 27 | Mariners | 10–1 | **Cole** (6–6) | Paxton (3–5) | — | 35,483 | 52–48 | W1 |
| 101 | July 29 | @ Brewers | 1–3 | Guerra (7–2) | **Brault** (0–1) | Jeffress (25) | 29,442 | 52–49 | L1 |
| 102 | July 30 | @ Brewers | 3–5 | Anderson (6–10) | **Taillon** (2–2) | Jeffress (26) | 36,663 | 52–50 | L2 |
| 103 | July 31 | @ Brewers | 2–4 | Garza (2–4) | **Liriano** (6–11) | Jeffress (27) | 32,405 | 52–51 | L3 |

August: 15–13 (Home: 5–7; Away: 10–6)

| # | Date | Opponent | Score | Win | Loss | Save | Attendance | Record | Streak |
|---|---|---|---|---|---|---|---|---|---|
| 104 | August 2 | @ Braves | 5–3 | **Cole** (7–6) | Foltynewicz (4–5) | **Watson** (1) | 20,633 | 53–51 | W1 |
| 105 | August 3 | @ Braves | 4–8 | Whalen (1–0) | **Locke** (8–7) | — | 19,281 | 53–52 | L1 |
| 106 | August 4 | @ Braves | 2–5 | Cervenka (1–0) | **Rivero** (0–4) | Johnson (7) | 20,527 | 53–53 | L2 |
| 107 | August 5 | Reds | 3–2 | **Watson** (2–3) | Ohlendorf (5–7) | — | 28,882 | 54–53 | W1 |
| 108 | August 6 | Reds | 5–3 | **Nova** (8–6) | Bailey (1–1) | **Watson** (2) | 34,259 | 55–53 | W2 |
| 109 | August 7 | Reds | 3–7 | Straily (7–6) | **Cole** (7–7) | — | 32,947 | 55–54 | L1 |
| 110 | August 9 | Padres | 6–4 | **Kuhl** (2–0) | Perdomo (5–6) | **Watson** (3) | 30,269 | 56–54 | W1 |
| 111 | August 10 | Padres | 0–4 | Jackson (3–2) | **Vogelsong** (1–2) | — | 29,623 | 56–55 | L1 |
| 112 | August 11 | Padres | 4–0 | **Taillon** (3–2) | Friedrich (4–8) | **Watson** (4) | 32,071 | 57–55 | W1 |
| 113 | August 12 | @ Dodgers | 5–1 | **Nova** (9–6) | Stripling (3–4) | **Watson** (5) | 47,438 | 58–55 | W2 |
| 114 | August 13 | @ Dodgers | 4–8 | Urias (3–2) | **Cole** (7–8) | Jansen (35) | 40,563 | 58–56 | L1 |
| 115 | August 14 | @ Dodgers | 11–3 | **Kuhl** (3–0) | Anderson (0–1) | — | 43,468 | 59–56 | W1 |
| 116 | August 15 | @ Giants | 8–5 | **Vogelsong** (2–2) | Moore (7–9) | — | 41,850 | 60–56 | W2 |
| 117 | August 16 | @ Giants | 4–3 | **Bastardo** (1–0) | Law (4–2) | **Watson** (6) | 41,185 | 61–56 | W3 |
| 118 | August 17 | @ Giants | 6–5 | **Nicasio** (9–6) | Cain (4–8) | **Watson** (7) | 41,139 | 62–56 | W4 |
| 119 | August 19 | Marlins | 5–6 | Wittgren (4–2) | **Feliz** (4–1) | Rodney (22) | 32,357 | 62–57 | L1 |
| 120 | August 20 | Marlins | 1–3 | Phelps (7–6) | **Kuhl** (3–1) | Rodney (23) | 37,820 | 62–58 | L2 |
| 121 | August 21 | Marlins | 2–3 | Ureña (2–4) | **Vogelsong** (2–3) | Rodney (24) | 28,616 | 62–59 | L3 |
| 122 | August 22 | Astros | 1–3 | Fister (12–8) | **Taillon** (3–3) | Giles (4) | 24,017 | 62–60 | L4 |
| 123 | August 23 | Astros | 7–1 | **Nova** (10–6) | Musgrove (1–2) | — | 28,760 | 63–60 | W1 |
| 124 | August 24 | Astros | 4–5 | McHugh (8–10) | **Cole** (7–9) | Giles (5) | 23,717 | 63–61 | L1 |
| 125 | August 25 | @ Brewers | 3–2 (10) | **Bastardo** (2–0) | Torres (2–3) | **Watson** (8) | 20,296 | 64–61 | W1 |
| 126 | August 26 | @ Brewers | 5–3 | **Vogelsong** (3–3) | Garza (4–6) | **Watson** (9) | 25,474 | 65–61 | W2 |
| 127 | August 27 | @ Brewers | 9–6 | **Locke** (9–7) | Boyer (1–3) | **Feliz** (2) | 35,925 | 66–61 | W3 |
| 128 | August 28 | @ Brewers | 3–1 | **Nova** (11–6) | Anderson (7–11) | **Watson** (10) | 37,583 | 67–61 | W4 |
| 129 | August 29 | @ Cubs | 7–8 (13) | Zastryzny (1–0) | **Locke** (9–8) | — | 38,951 | 67–62 | L1 |
| 130 | August 30 | @ Cubs | 0–3 | Hendricks (13–7) | **Kuhl** (3–2) | Chapman (11) | 38,174 | 67–63 | L2 |
| 131 | August 31 | @ Cubs | 5–6 | Hammel (14–7) | **Vogelsong** (3–4) | Chapman (12) | 38,137 | 67–64 | L3 |

September: 11–17 (Home: 4–12; Away: 7–5)

| # | Date | Opponent | Score | Win | Loss | Save | Attendance | Record | Streak |
|---|---|---|---|---|---|---|---|---|---|
| 132 | September 2 | Brewers | 0–1 | Boyer (2–3) | **Taillon** (3–4) | Thornburg (7) | 21,772 | 67–65 | L4 |
| 133 | September 3 | Brewers | 4–7 | Torres (3–3) | **Feliz** (4–2) | Thornburg (8) | 26,637 | 67–66 | L5 |
| 134 | September 4 | Brewers | 0–10 | Anderson (8–11) | **Brault** (0–2) | — | 25,318 | 67–67 | L6 |
| 135 | September 5 | Cardinals | 6–12 | Wainwright (10–8) | **Kuhl** (3–3) | — | 26,297 | 67–68 | L7 |
| 136 | September 6 | Cardinals | 7–9 | Mayers (1–1) | **Watson** (2–4) | Oh (16) | 20,369 | 67–69 | L8 |
| 137 | September 7 | Cardinals | 4–3 | **Williams** (1–0) | Reyes (1–1) | **Watson** (11) | 21,523 | 68–69 | W1 |
| 138 | September 8 | Reds | 4–1 | **Nova** (12–6) | Straily (11–8) | — | 24,520 | 69–69 | W2 |
| 139 | September 9 | Reds | 3–4 | Iglesias (3–1) | **Watson** (2–5) | — | 20,369 | 69–70 | L1 |
| 140 | September 10 | Reds | 7–8 | Smith (3–1) | **Williams** (1–1) | Cingrani (17) | 25,918 | 69–71 | L2 |
| 141 | September 11 | Reds | 0–8 | Finnegan (9–10) | **Vogelsong** (3–5) | — | 26,744 | 69–72 | L3 |
| 142 | September 12 | @ Phillies | 2–6 | Hellickson (11–9) | **Cole** (7–10) | — | 15,514 | 69–73 | L4 |
| 143 | September 13 | @ Phillies | 5–3 | **Rivero** (1–4) | Gomez (3–4) | **Watson** (12) | 16,190 | 70–73 | W1 |
| 144 | September 14 | @ Phillies | 2–6 | Thompson (2–5) | **Brault** (0–3) | Gomez (37) | 16,112 | 70–74 | L1 |
| 145 | September 15 | @ Phillies | 15–2 | **Kuhl** (4–3) | Eickhoff (10–14) | — | 15,247 | 71–74 | W1 |
| 146 | September 16 | @ Reds | 9–7 (10) | **Bastardo** (3–0) | Cingrani (2–5) | **Watson** (13) | 20,238 | 72–74 | W2 |
| 147 | September 17 | @ Reds | 10–4 | **Taillon** (4–4) | DeSclafani (8–4) | **LeBlanc** (1) | 17,226 | 73–74 | W3 |
| 148 | September 17 | @ Reds | 7–3 | **Nicasio** (10–6) | Finnegan (9–11) | — | 24,397 | 74–74 | W4 |
| 149 | September 18 | @ Reds | 4–7 | Straily (13–8) | **Nova** (12–7) | — | 19,597 | 74–75 | L1 |
| 150 | September 20 | @ Brewers | 6–3 | **Hughes** (1–1) | Garza (5–8) | **Watson** (14) | 20,829 | 75–75 | W1 |
| 151 | September 21 | @ Brewers | 4–1 | **Kuhl** (5–3) | Nelson (8–15) | **Watson** (15) | 25,482 | 76–75 | W2 |
| 152 | September 22 | @ Brewers | 1–3 | Anderson (9–11) | **Vogelsong** (3–6) | Thornburg (12) | 24,582 | 76–76 | L1 |
| 153 | September 23 | Nationals | 6–5 (11) | **LeBlanc** (4–0) | Petit (3–5) | — | 29,513 | 77–76 | W1 |
| 154 | September 24 | Nationals | 1–6 | López (4–3) | **Nova** (5–2) | — | 30,137 | 77–77 | L1 |
| 155 | September 25 | Nationals | 7–10 | Kelley (3–2) | **Rivero** (1–5) | Melancon (43) | 28,924 | 77–78 | L2 |
| 156 | September 26 | Cubs | 2–12 | Hendricks (16–8) | **Kuhl** (5–4) | — | 20,519 | 77–79 | L3 |
| 157 | September 27 | Cubs | 4–6 | Lackey (11–8) | **Vogelsong** (3–7) | Peña (1) | 22,454 | 77–80 | L4 |
| 158 | September 28 | Cubs | 8–4 | **Taillon** (5–4) | Arrieta (18–8) | — | | 78–80 | W1 |
| 159 | September 29 | Cubs | 1–1 (6) | **Game called (inclement weather)** (game not made up; tie does not count in record) | | | 19,991 | 78–80 | — |
| 160 | September 30 | @ Cardinals | 0–7 | Martinez (16–9) | **Glasnow** (0–2) | — | 43,070 | 78–81 | L1 |

October: 0–2 (Home: 0–0; Away: 0–2)

| # | Date | Opponent | Score | Win | Loss | Save | Attendance | Record | Streak |
|---|---|---|---|---|---|---|---|---|---|
| 161 | October 1 | @ Cardinals | 3–4 | Siegrist (6–3) | **Rivero** (1–6) | Oh (19) | 43,328 | 78–82 | L2 |
| 162 | October 2 | @ Cardinals | 4–10 | Broxton (4–2) | **Nicasio** (10–7) | — | 44,615 | 78–83 | L3 |

Legend: = Win = Loss = Postponement
Bold = Pirates team member

== Roster ==
2016 Pittsburgh Pirates
Roster
| Pitchers: 59 Antonio Bastardo; 69 Wilfredo Boscán; 43 Steven Brault; 37 Arquimedes Caminero; 52 Phil Coke; 45 Gerrit Cole; 30 Neftalí Feliz; 51 Tyler Glasnow; 48 Jared Hughes; 34 Drew Hutchison; 39 Chad Kuhl; 38 Wade LeBlanc; 47 Francisco Liriano; 53 Kyle Lobstein; 49 Jeff Locke; 26 Cory Luebke; 58 Kelvin Marte; 35 Mark Melancon; 12 Juan Nicasio; 18 Jon Niese; 46 Iván Nova; 46,52 Curtis Partch; 53 Zach Phillips; 57 Jorge Rondón; 52 Rob Scahill; 31 A. J. Schugel; 50 Jameson Taillon; 73 Felipe Vázquez; 14 Ryan Vogelsong; 44 Tony Watson; 57 Trevor Williams | Catchers: 29 Francisco Cervelli; 32 Elías Díaz; 24 Eric Fryer; 38 Erik Kratz; 58 Jacob Stallings; 19 Chris Stewart; Infielders: 55 Josh Bell; 24 Cole Figueroa; 18 Pedro Florimón; 23 David Freese; 37,59 Alen Hanson; 5 Josh Harrison; 28 John Jaso; 27 Jung-ho Kang; 10 Jordy Mercer; 38 Max Moroff; 38 Michael Morse; 3 Sean Rodriguez; 15 Jason Rogers | Outfielders: 26 Adam Frazier; 17 Matthew Joyce; 6 Starling Marté; 22 Andrew McCutchen; 25 Gregory Polanco | Manager: 13 Clint Hurdle; Coaches: 86 Heberto Andrade (bullpen catcher); 36 Brad Fischer (coach); 2 Jeff Branson (hitting); 89 Jordan Comadena (bullpen catcher); 85 Dave Jauss (bench); 16 Nick Leyva (first base); 75 Jeff Livesey (assistant hitting); 56 Euclides Rojas (bullpen); 54 Ray Searage (pitching); 41 Rick Sofield (third base) |

=== Opening Day lineup ===
Opening Day Starters
| Name | Position |
|---|---|
| John Jaso | 1B |
| Andrew McCutchen | CF |
| David Freese | 3B |
| Starling Marte | LF |
| Francisco Cervelli | C |
| Gregory Polanco | RF |
| Josh Harrison | 2B |
| Jordy Mercer | SS |
| Francisco Liriano | SP |

=== Disabled lists ===
==== 15-day disabled list ====
| Player | Injury | Placed | Activated |
|---|---|---|---|
| Jung-ho Kang | Left Knee Injury | March 25, 2016 | May 6, 2016 |
| Elías Díaz | Right Elbow Strain | March 25, 2016 | May 19, 2016 |
| Jared Hughes | Left Lat Strain | March 25, 2016 | April 30, 2016 |
| Cory Luebke | Right Hamstring Tightness | April 14, 2016 | May 15, 2016 |
| Ryan Vogelsong | Facial Fractures | May 24, 2016 | June 4, 2016 |
| Arquimedes Caminero | Left Quadriceps Strain | May 25, 2016 | June 11, 2016 |
| Francisco Cervelli | Broken Hamate Bone In Left Hand | June 11, 2016 | July 19, 2016 |
| Gerrit Cole | Right Triceps Muscle Strain | June 11, 2016 | July 16, 2016 |
| Chris Stewart | Left Knee Discomfort | July 4, 2016 | September 2, 2016 |
| Jameson Taillon | Right Shoulder Fatigue | July 5, 2016 | July 19, 2016 |
| Tyler Glasnow | Right Shoulder Discomfort | July 24, 2016 | August 28, 2016 |
| Jung-ho Kang | Left Shoulder Injury | August 20, 2016 | September 5, 2016 |
| Gerrit Cole | Posterior Inflammation of Right Elbow | August 25, 2016 | September 12, 2016 |
| Starling Marte | Back Tightness | October 1, 2016 | October 3, 2016 |

==== 60-day disabled list ====
| Player | Injury | Placed | Activated |
|---|---|---|---|
| Elías Díaz | Right Elbow Debridement | May 19, 2016 | July 23, 2016 |
| Ryan Vogelsong | Facial Fractures | June 4, 2016 | August 4, 2016 |
| Elías Díaz | Cellulitis of His Left Knee | September 13, 2016 | November 4, 2016 |
| Chris Stewart | Left Knee Discomfort | September 13, 2016 | November 4, 2016 |
| Gerrit Cole | Right Elbow Posterior Inflammation | September 13, 2016 | November 4, 2016 |
| A. J. Schugel | Right Shoulder Discomfort | September 23, 2016 | November 4, 2016 |
| Josh Harrison | Right Groin Strain | September 26, 2016 | November 4, 2016 |

== Notable achievements ==
=== Awards ===
Rawlings Gold Glove Award

- Starling Marte, OF

2016 Major League Baseball All-Star Game

- Mark Melancon, P, reserve
- Starling Marte, OF, reserve (replacing Yoenis Céspedes)

National League Player of the Week Award

- Jung-ho Kang (September 5–11)
- Sean Rodriguez (September 12–18)

Sporting News NL All-Star Team

- Starling Marte, OF

== Statistics ==
=== Players ===
Updated as of games on October 2, 2016

Batting

Note: G = Games played; AB = At bats; H = Hits; Avg. = Batting average; HR = Home runs; RBI = Runs batted in

Regular season
| Player | G | AB | H | Avg. | HR | RBI |
|---|---|---|---|---|---|---|
| Pedro Florimón | 18 | 24 | 5 | 0.208 | 0 | 4 |
| Adam Frazier | 66 | 146 | 44 | 0.301 | 2 | 11 |
| Wilfredo Boscán | 6 | 3 | 1 | 0.333 | 0 | 1 |
| **Starling Marte** | 129 | 489 | 152 | 0.311 | 9 | 46 |
| Josh Bell | 45 | 128 | 35 | 0.273 | 3 | 19 |
| Francisco Liriano^{‡} | 23 | 42 | 12 | 0.286 | 1 | 5 |
| **Josh Harrison** | 131 | 487 | 138 | 0.283 | 4 | 59 |
| Jung-ho Kang | 103 | 318 | 81 | 0.255 | 21 | 62 |
| David Freese | 141 | 437 | 118 | 0.270 | 13 | 55 |
| **Gregory Polanco** | 144 | 527 | 136 | 0.258 | 22 | 86 |
| John Jaso | 132 | 380 | 102 | 0.268 | 8 | 42 |
| Francisco Cervelli | 101 | 326 | 86 | 0.264 | 1 | 33 |
| **Jordy Mercer** | 149 | 519 | 133 | 0.256 | 11 | 59 |
| Matt Joyce | 140 | 231 | 56 | 0.242 | 13 | 42 |
| Tyler Glasnow | 7 | 7 | 1 | 0.143 | 0 | 0 |
| Sean Rodriguez | 140 | 300 | 81 | 0.270 | 18 | 56 |
| **Andrew McCutchen** | 153 | 598 | 153 | 0.256 | 24 | 79 |
| Chris Stewart | 34 | 98 | 21 | 0.214 | 1 | 7 |
| Steven Brault | 8 | 8 | 2 | 0.250 | 0 | 0 |
| Gerrit Cole | 21 | 40 | 8 | 0.200 | 1 | 3 |
| Eric Fryer | 36 | 78 | 17 | 0.218 | 0 | 8 |
| Ivan Nova^{†} | 11 | 22 | 3 | 0.136 | 0 | 0 |
| Alen Hanson | 27 | 31 | 7 | 0.226 | 0 | 1 |
| Juan Nicasio | 52 | 19 | 3 | 0.158 | 0 | 1 |
| Cole Figueroa | 23 | 26 | 4 | 0.154 | 0 | 3 |
| Jeff Locke | 31 | 32 | 4 | 0.125 | 0 | 0 |
| Jacob Stallings | 5 | 15 | 6 | 0.400 | 0 | 2 |
| Erik Kratz^{†} | 18 | 56 | 6 | 0.107 | 1 | 4 |
| Jonathon Niese^{‡} | 24 | 30 | 3 | 0.100 | 0 | 1 |
| Chad Kuhl | 15 | 23 | 2 | 0.087 | 0 | 0 |
| Jason Rogers | 23 | 25 | 2 | 0.080 | 0 | 2 |
| Jameson Taillon | 18 | 32 | 3 | 0.094 | 0 | 2 |
| Ryan Vogelsong | 24 | 19 | 1 | 0.053 | 0 | 1 |
| Arquimedes Caminero^{‡} | 39 | 2 | 0 | 0.000 | 0 | 0 |
| Elías Díaz | 1 | 4 | 0 | 0.000 | 0 | 1 |
| Jared Hughes | 67 | 1 | 0 | 0.000 | 0 | 0 |
| Drew Hutchison^{†} | 6 | 1 | 0 | 0.000 | 0 | 0 |
| Kyle Lobstein^{‡} | 14 | 2 | 0 | 0.000 | 0 | 0 |
| Max Moroff | 2 | 2 | 0 | 0.000 | 0 | 0 |
| Michael Morse | 6 | 8 | 0 | 0.000 | 0 | 0 |
| Rob Scahill^{‡} | 15 | 2 | 0 | 0.000 | 0 | 0 |
| A.J. Schugel | 36 | 2 | 0 | 0.000 | 0 | 0 |
| Tony Watson | 65 | 1 | 0 | 0.000 | 0 | 0 |
| Trevor Williams | 7 | 1 | 0 | 0.000 | 0 | 1 |
| Antonio Bastardo^{†} | 28 | 0 | 0 | — | 0 | 0 |
| Neftalí Feliz | 62 | 0 | 0 | — | 0 | 0 |
| Cory Luebke | 9 | 0 | 0 | — | 0 | 0 |
| Kelvin Marte | 2 | 0 | 0 | — | 0 | 0 |
| Mark Melancon^{‡} | 45 | 0 | 0 | — | 0 | 0 |
| Curtis Partch | 2 | 0 | 0 | — | 0 | 0 |
| Felipe Rivero^{‡} | 28 | 0 | 0 | — | 0 | 0 |
| Jorge Rondón | 2 | 0 | 0 | — | 0 | 0 |
| **Team totals** | **162** | **5,542** | **1,426** | **0.257** | **153** | **696** |

Pitching

Note: G = Games pitched; IP = Innings pitched; W = Wins; L = Losses; ERA = Earned run average; SO = Strikeouts

Regular season
| Player | G | IP | W | L | ERA | SO |
|---|---|---|---|---|---|---|
| Erik Kratz^{†} | 1 | 1 | 0 | 0 | 0.00 | 1 |
| Kelvin Marte | 2 | 3 1/3 | 0 | 0 | 0.00 | 1 |
| Phil Coke | 3 | 4 | 0 | 0 | 0.00 | 3 |
| Wade LeBlanc | 8 | 12 | 1 | 0 | 0.75 | 10 |
| Felipe Rivero^{‡} | 28 | 27 1/3 | 1 | 3 | 3.29 | 39 |
| Mark Melancon^{‡} | 45 | 41 2/3 | 1 | 1 | 1.51 | 38 |
| Iván Nova^{†} | 11 | 64 2/3 | 5 | 2 | 3.06 | 52 |
| Antonio Bastardo^{†} | 28 | 24 | 3 | 0 | 4.13 | 28 |
| Zach Phillips | 8 | 6 2/3 | 0 | 0 | 2.70 | 3 |
| Jared Hughes | 67 | 59 1/3 | 1 | 1 | 3.03 | 34 |
| Tony Watson | 70 | 67 2/3 | 2 | 5 | 3.06 | 58 |
| Jameson Taillon | 18 | 104 | 5 | 4 | 3.38 | 85 |
| Steven Brault | 8 | 33 1/3 | 0 | 3 | 4.86 | 29 |
| Arquimedes Caminero^{‡} | 39 | 41 | 1 | 2 | 3.51 | 32 |
| Neftalí Feliz | 62 | 53 2/3 | 4 | 2 | 3.52 | 61 |
| A.J. Schugel | 36 | 52 | 2 | 2 | 3.63 | 46 |
| Gerrit Cole | 21 | 116 | 7 | 10 | 3.88 | 98 |
| Kyle Lobstein^{‡} | 14 | 25 | 2 | 0 | 3.96 | 15 |
| Chad Kuhl | 14 | 70 2/3 | 5 | 4 | 4.20 | 53 |
| Rob Scahill^{‡} | 15 | 16 1/3 | 0 | 0 | 4.41 | 13 |
| Ryan Vogelsong | 24 | 82 1/3 | 3 | 7 | 4.81 | 61 |
| Juan Nicasio | 52 | 118 | 10 | 7 | 4.50 | 138 |
| Jonathon Niese^{‡} | 23 | 110 | 8 | 6 | 4.91 | 76 |
| Francisco Liriano^{‡} | 21 | 113 2/3 | 6 | 11 | 5.46 | 116 |
| Jeff Locke | 30 | 127 1/3 | 9 | 8 | 5.44 | 73 |
| Tyler Glasnow | 7 | 23 1/3 | 0 | 2 | 4.24 | 24 |
| Wilfredo Boscán | 6 | 15 1/3 | 1 | 1 | 6.46 | 8 |
| Trevor Williams | 7 | 12 2/3 | 1 | 1 | 7.82 | 11 |
| Drew Hutchison^{†} | 6 | 11 1/3 | 0 | 0 | 5.56 | 10 |
| Cory Luebke | 9 | 8 2/3 | 0 | 1 | 9.35 | 9 |
| Jorge Rondón | 2 | 3 2/3 | 0 | 0 | 17.18 | 4 |
| Curtis Partch | 2 | 2/3 | 0 | 0 | 40.50 | 0 |
| **Team totals** | **162** | **1,450 2/3** | **78** | **83** | **4.21** | **1,232** |

Legend

– Stats reflect time with the Pirates only.
^{†} – Denotes player was acquired during season.
^{‡} – Denotes player was relinquished during season.
– Injured reserve.
Bold – Qualified for batting title (3.1 plate appearances per team game) or ERA title (1 inning pitched per team game)

== Transactions ==
The Pirates were involved in the following transactions during the 2016 season:

=== Trades ===
| November 25, 2015 | To Arizona Diamondbacks: Cash Considerations | To Pittsburgh Pirates: Allen Webster |
| December 9, 2015 | To New York Mets: Neil Walker | To Pittsburgh Pirates: Jon Niese |
| December 12, 2015 | To Philadelphia Phillies: Charlie Morton | To Pittsburgh Pirates: David Whitehead |
| December 17, 2015 | To Milwaukee Brewers: Keon Broxton; Trey Supak | To Pittsburgh Pirates: Jason Rogers |
| December 21, 2015 | To Detroit Tigers: Cash Considerations | To Pittsburgh Pirates: Kyle Lobstein |
| March 27, 2016 | To Atlanta Braves: Eric O'Flaherty | To Pittsburgh Pirates: Cash Considerations |
| June 11, 2016 | To Los Angeles Angels: Cash Considerations | To Pittsburgh Pirates: Erik Kratz |
| July 30, 2016 | To Washington Nationals: Mark Melancon | To Pittsburgh Pirates: Felipe Rivero; Taylor Hearn |
| August 1, 2016 | To New York Yankees: Two Players To Be Named Later (8/30/16); Tito Polo; Stephen Tarpley | To Pittsburgh Pirates: Iván Nova |
| August 1, 2016 | To Toronto Blue Jays: Francisco Liriano; Harold Ramírez; Reese McGuire | To Pittsburgh Pirates: Drew Hutchison |
| August 1, 2016 | To New York Mets: Jon Niese | To Pittsburgh Pirates: Antonio Bastardo |
| August 6, 2016 | To Seattle Mariners: Arquimedes Caminero | To Pittsburgh Pirates: Player To Be Named Later and Future Considerations (9/1/16); Jake Brentz; Pedro Vasquez |
| August 31, 2016 | To Baltimore Orioles: Kyle Lobstein | To Pittsburgh Pirates: Zach Phillips |
| September 13, 2016 | To Seattle Mariners: Player To Be Named Later or Cash Considerations | To Pittsburgh Pirates: Wade LeBlanc |
| September 22, 2016 | To New York Yankees: Cash Considerations | To Pittsburgh Pirates: Phil Coke |
| September 26, 2016 | To Washington Nationals: Taylor Gushue and Cash Considerations | To Pittsburgh Pirates: Chris Bostick |
| October 5, 2016 | To Toronto Blue Jays: Cash Considerations | To Pittsburgh Pirates: Brady Dragmire |

=== Free agents ===
| Player | Acquired from | Lost to | Date | Contract terms |
|---|---|---|---|---|
| Francisco Diaz | | New York Yankees | November 16, 2015 | Minor league contract |
| Frank Herrmann | | Philadelphia Phillies | November 18, 2015 | Minor league contract |
| Blake Wood | | Cincinnati Reds | November 20, 2015 | 1 year |
| Jake Goebbert | San Diego Padres | | November 25, 2015 | 1 year |
| J. A. Happ | | Toronto Blue Jays | November 27, 2015 | 3 years/$36 million |
| Cole Figueroa | New York Yankees | | December 3, 2015 | Minor league contract |
| Joakim Soria | | Kansas City Royals | December 10, 2015 | 3 years/$25 million |
| Juan Nicasio | Los Angeles Dodgers | | December 10, 2015 | 1 year/$3 million |
| Ryan Vogelsong | San Francisco Giants | | December 18, 2015 | 1 year/$2 million |
| John Jaso | Tampa Bay Rays | | December 23, 2015 | 2 years/$8 million |
| Neftalí Feliz | Detroit Tigers | | January 6, 2016 | 1 year/$3.9 million |
| Joe Blanton | | Los Angeles Dodgers | January 19, 2016 | 1 year/$4 million |
| Antonio Bastardo | | New York Mets | January 22, 2016 | 2 years/$12 million |
| Jaff Decker | | Toronto Blue Jays | January 22, 2016 | Minor league contract |
| Corey Hart | | Toronto Blue Jays | February 23, 2016 | Minor league hitting coach |
| Pedro Alvarez | | Baltimore Orioles | March 8, 2016 | 1 year/$5.75 million |
| David Freese | Los Angeles Angels | | March 11, 2016 | 1 year/$3 million |

=== Waivers ===
| Player | Claimed from | Lost to | Date |
|---|---|---|---|
| Andrew Lambo | | Oakland Athletics | November 6, 2015 |
| Guido Knudson | Detroit Tigers | | November 9, 2015 |
| Bobby LaFromboise | | Los Angeles Angels of Anaheim | December 23, 2015 |
| Yoervis Medina | Chicago Cubs | | December 23, 2015 |
| A. J. Schugel | Seattle Mariners | | January 19, 2016 |

=== Signings ===
| Name | Date | Details |
|---|---|---|
| Sean Rodriguez | December 15, 2015 | 1 year/$2.5 million |
| Jeff Locke | January 14, 2016 | 1 year/$3.025 million |
| Chris Stewart | January 14, 2016 | 2 years/$3 million (contract extension) |
| Francisco Cervelli | January 15, 2016 | 1 year/$3.5 million |
| Jordy Mercer | January 15, 2016 | 1 year/$2.075 million |
| Mark Melancon | January 15, 2016 | 1 year/$9.65 million |
| Tony Watson | January 15, 2016 | 1 year/$3.45 million |
| Jared Hughes | January 15, 2016 | 1 year/$2.175 million |
| Gregory Polanco | April 5, 2016 | 5 years/$35 million (contract extension) |
| Francisco Cervelli | May 17, 2016 | 3 years/$31 million (contract extension) |
| David Freese | August 22, 2016 | 2 years/$10.5 million (contract extension) |

=== Other ===
| Name | Date | Details |
|---|---|---|
| Aramis Ramírez | November 5, 2015 | Retired |
| Matt Ford | December 24, 2015 | Hired as minor league pitching coach |
| Rick Sofield | October 22, 2016 | Fired as third base coach |
| Nick Leyva | October 22, 2016 | Named Senior Advisor to Baseball Operations |
| Kimera Bartee | October 29, 2016 | Named First Base Coach |
| Tom Prince | October 29, 2016 | Named Bench Coach |
| Joey Cora | October 29, 2016 | Named Third Base Coach |
| Dave Jauss | October 29, 2016 | Named Coach |

== Draft picks ==
2016 Top 10 Rounds Draft Picks
| Rd | # | Player | Pos | DOB and Age | School (State) | Signed |
|---|---|---|---|---|---|---|
| 1 | 22 | Will Craig | 3B | November 16, 1994 (aged 21) | Wake Forest (NC) | |
| LOT A | 41 | Nick Lodolo | LHP | February 5, 1998 (aged 18) | Damien High School (CA) | |
| 2 | 68 | Travis Macgregor | RHP | October 15, 1997 (aged 18) | East Lake High School (FL) | |
| 3 | 105 | Stephen Alemais | SS | April 12, 1995 (aged 21) | Tulane (LA) | |
| 4 | 135 | Braeden Ogle | LHP | July 30, 1997 (aged 18) | Jensen Beach High School (FL) | |
| 5 | 165 | Blake Cederlind | RHP | January 14, 1996 (aged 20) | Merced College (CA) | |
| 6 | 195 | Cam Vieaux | LHP | February 5, 1993 (aged 23) | Michigan State University (MI) | |
| 7 | 225 | Brent Gibbs | C | September 27, 1994 (aged 21) | Central Arizona College (AZ) | |
| 8 | 255 | Dylan Prohoroff | RHP | November 29, 1994 (aged 21) | Cal State Fullerton (CA) | |
| 9 | 285 | Clark Eagan | CF | March 13, 1995 (aged 21) | Arkansas State University (AR) | |
| 10 | 315 | Matthew Anderson | RHP | July 29, 1994 (aged 21) | Morehead State University (KY) | |

== Farm system ==
| Level | Team | League | Manager |
|---|---|---|---|
| AAA | Indianapolis Indians | International League | Dean Treanor |
| AA | Altoona Curve | Eastern League | Joey Cora |
| A-Advanced | Bradenton Marauders | Florida State League | Michael Ryan |
| A | West Virginia Power | South Atlantic League | Brian Esposito |
| Short-Season A | West Virginia Black Bears | New York–Penn League | Wyatt Toregas |
| Rookie | Bristol Pirates | Appalachian League | Edgar Varela |
| Rookie | GCL Pirates | Gulf Coast League | Milver Reyes |
| Rookie | DSL Pirates | Dominican Summer League | |

LEAGUE CHAMPIONS: Bradenton
