= Cole Figueroa =

American baseball player (born 1987)

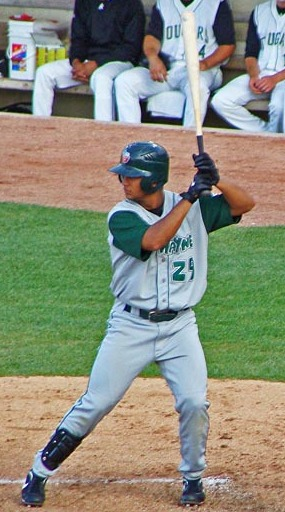
- Figueroa with the Fort Wayne TinCaps in 2009
- Infielder
- Born: June 30, 1987 (age 39); Tallahassee, Florida, U.S.
- Batted: Left Threw: Right

MLB debut
- May 16, 2014, for the Tampa Bay Rays

Last MLB appearance
- June 10, 2016, for the Pittsburgh Pirates

MLB statistics
- Batting average: .208
- Home runs: 0
- Runs batted in: 9
- Stats at Baseball Reference

Teams
- Tampa Bay Rays (2014); New York Yankees (2015); Pittsburgh Pirates (2016)

Stephen Coleman Figueroa (born June 30, 1987) is an American former professional baseball infielder and current assistant general manager for the Texas Rangers of Major League Baseball (MLB). He played in MLB from 2014 to 2016 for the Tampa Bay Rays, New York Yankees, and Pittsburgh Pirates.

== Amateur career ==
Figueroa attended Lincoln High School in Tallahassee, Florida, where he helped take the school's baseball team to the District 4A Championship. Figueroa played college baseball at the University of Florida while majoring in Sports Management. Figueroa's college achievements included All-Southeastern Conference (SEC) Freshman Team the SEC all-academic team. Figueroa was also named freshman All-American by rivals.com, Louisville Slugger, and Baseball America. He was selected to the Dick Howser Trophy watch list.

In 2008, Figueroa was named to the All-SEC academic team. He was named a Golden Spikes Award finalist along with being named to the midseason watch list for the Brooks Wallace Award. Figueroa led the Gators that year in average, home runs, RBI, Slugging percentage and on-base percentage.

In 2007, he played collegiate summer baseball with the Harwich Mariners of the Cape Cod Baseball League (CCBL), and was named a league all-star. He returned to the CCBL in 2008 to play for the Orleans Cardinals.

== Professional career ==
=== San Diego Padres ===
Figueroa was drafted by the San Diego Padres in the 6th round, with the 195th overall selection, of the 2008 Major League Baseball draft by the San Diego Padres. Figueroa received an over slot $400,000 signing bonus when he signed a contract with the Padres on July 5, 2008. He made his professional debut with the Low-A Eugene Emeralds, hitting .290 in 32 games.

Figueroa split the 2009 campaign between the Single-A Fort Wayne TinCaps and High-A Lake Elsinore Storm. In 91 appearances split between the two affiliates, he batted .288/.374/.361 with one home run, 43 RBI, and 15 stolen bases. Figueroa spent the 2010 season back with Lake Elsinore, playing in 124 games and hitting .303/.408/.392 with four home runs, 66 RBI, and 26 stolen bases.

=== Tampa Bay Rays ===
The Padres traded Figueroa to the Tampa Bay Rays along with Brandon Gomes, Cesar Ramos, and Adam Russell in exchange for Jason Bartlett on December 17, 2010.

The Rays called up Figueroa to the major leagues on May 15, 2014 and he made his MLB debut two days later. In 23 games during his rookie campaign, he batted .233/.286/.326 with no home runs and six RBI. Figueroa was designated for assignment by the Rays on November 20, and released by the team the same day.

=== New York Yankees ===
On December 12, 2014, Figueroa signed a minor league contract with the New York Yankees organization. He began the season with the Scranton/Wilkes-Barre RailRiders of the Triple-A International League. On July 9, 2015, the Yankees selected Figueroa's contract, adding him to their active roster. In 2 games for New York, he went 2-for-8 (.260). Figueroa was designated for assignment by the Yankees on September 1. He cleared waivers and was sent outright to Scranton two days later. Figueroa elected free agency on November 6.

=== Pittsburgh Pirates ===
On December 8, 2015, Figueroa signed a minor league contract with the Pittsburgh Pirates. On April 2, 2016, it was announced that Figueroa would make the Pirates' Opening Day roster as a reserve infielder, beating out offseason acquisition Jason Rogers and incumbent Pedro Florimón for the job. He hit .260/.321/.340 in 57 plate appearances in spring training.

Figueroa made his Pirates debut on April 8, 2016, fouling out to third base in a pinch hit appearance. On June 24, he was designated for assignment.

=== Los Angeles Dodgers ===
On June 28, 2016, Figueroa was claimed off waivers by the Los Angeles Dodgers and subsequently optioned to the Triple-A Oklahoma City Dodgers. He was designated for assignment by the Dodgers on July 8, and elected free agency over an outright assignment on July 11.

== Post-playing career ==
=== Tampa Bay Rays ===
On December 16, 2021, the Tampa Bay Rays announced that Figueroa had been promoted to serve as the team's director of baseball operations.

=== Texas Rangers ===
On November 4, 2024, Figueroa was named the assistant general manager of the Texas Rangers.

== Personal life ==
Figueroa is the son of Cindy and Bien Figueroa. His father played in the major leagues for the St. Louis Cardinals. Cole, his wife Natalie, and son currently reside in Tampa, Florida.

== See also ==
- List of second-generation Major League Baseball players
