= Cory Burns =

American baseball pitcher (born 1987)

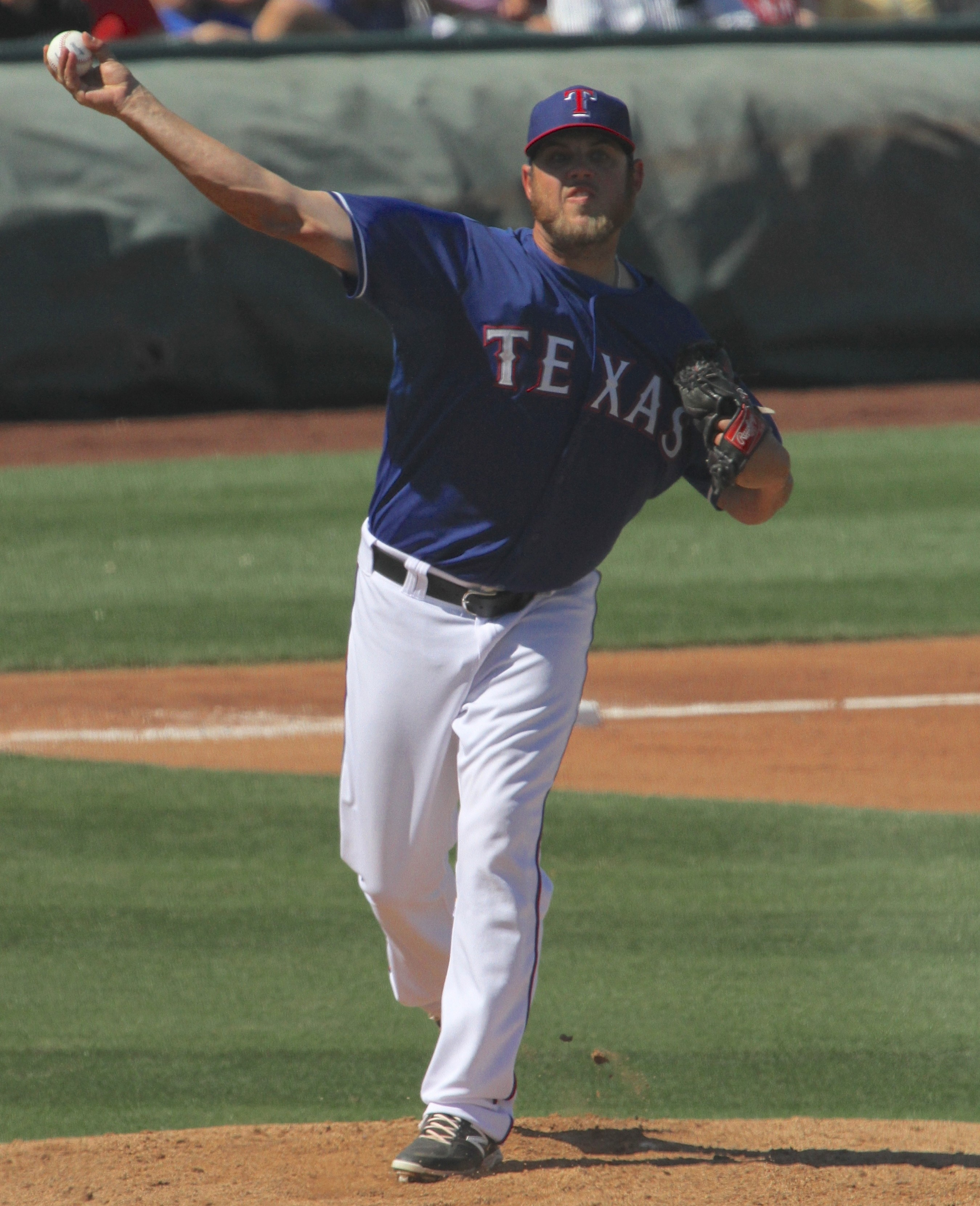
- Burns pitching for the Texas Rangers in 2014 spring training
- Pitcher
- Born: October 9, 1987 (age 38); Phoenix, Arizona, U.S.
- Batted: Right Threw: Right

MLB debut
- August 4, 2012, for the San Diego Padres

Last MLB appearance
- September 4, 2013, for the Texas Rangers

MLB statistics
- Win–loss record: 1–1
- Earned run average: 4.60
- Strikeouts: 23
- Stats at Baseball Reference

Teams
- San Diego Padres (2012); Texas Rangers (2013)

Cory Wade Burns (born October 9, 1987) is an American former professional baseball pitcher. He previously played in Major League Baseball (MLB) for the San Diego Padres, and Texas Rangers and Lancaster Barnstormers of the independent Atlantic League of Professional Baseball.

== Professional career ==
=== Cleveland Indians ===
Burns was drafted by the Cleveland Indians in the eighth round of the 2009 Major League Baseball draft out of the University of Arizona.

=== San Diego Padres ===
He was traded to the San Diego Padres on December 16, 2011, for Aaron Cunningham.

The Padres called Burns up to the majors for the first time on August 3, 2012, and sent him down to the Tucson Padres on August 5. He was recalled on August 11 when Huston Street was placed on the disabled list.

=== Texas Rangers ===
Burns was acquired by the Texas Rangers on November 28, 2012, and split the 2013 season between the Rangers and the Triple-A Round Rock Express. Wilfredo Boscán was sent to the Padres on December 6 to complete the trade.

=== Tampa Bay Rays ===
Burns was claimed off waivers by the Tampa Bay Rays on June 30, 2014, and optioned to the Double-A Montgomery Biscuits. He also played for the Triple-A Durham Bulls in 2014.

=== Toronto Blue Jays ===
Burns was claimed off waivers by the Toronto Blue Jays on September 28, 2014. He was designated for assignment on January 14, 2015, and outrighted to the Triple-A Buffalo Bisons on January 16. He was assigned to the Double-A New Hampshire Fisher Cats on April 2. Burns elected free agency on November 6, 2015.

=== Lancaster Barnstormers ===
On March 15, 2016, Burns signed with the Lancaster Barnstormers of the Atlantic League of Professional Baseball.

=== New York Mets ===
On December 15, 2016, Burns signed a minor league contract with the New York Mets organization. He split the 2017 season between the Double–A Binghamton Rumble Ponies and Triple–A Las Vegas 51s. In 46 combined appearances, he logged a 4.70 ERA with 63 strikeouts and 19 saves in 53 2/3 innings pitched. Burns elected free agency following the season on November 6.
