= Kelvin Marte =

Dominican baseball player (born 1987)

- Pitcher
- Born: November 24, 1987 (age 38); Santo Domingo, Dominican Republic
- Batted: Right Threw: Left

MLB debut
- September 3, 2016, for the Pittsburgh Pirates

Last MLB appearance
- September 4, 2016, for the Pittsburgh Pirates

MLB statistics
- Win–loss record: 0–0
- Earned run average: 0.00
- Strikeouts: 1
- Stats at Baseball Reference

Teams
- Pittsburgh Pirates (2016)

Kelvin Marte (born November 24, 1987) is a Dominican former professional baseball pitcher who played in Major League Baseball (MLB) for the Pittsburgh Pirates, with whom he made his MLB debut in 2016.

== Career ==
=== San Francisco Giants ===
Marte signed with the San Francisco Giants as an international free agent in 2007, making his professional debut with the Dominican Summer League Giants. Marte spent 2008 with the rookie-level Arizona League Giants and Low-A Salem-Keizer Volcanoes, accumulating a 2.53 ERA with 41 strikeouts across 16 games (7 starts). In 2009, he spent the year with the Single-A Augusta GreenJackets, registering a 3.00 ERA with 11 strikeouts over 5 starts. Marte split the 2010 season between the High-A San Jose Giants, Augusta, and the AZL Giants, posting an aggregate 4.06 ERA with 28 strikeouts across 14 games (5 starts).

Marte started 25 games for San Jose during the 2011 campaign, compiling a 12–6 record and 3.47 ERA with 84 strikeouts across 147 2/3 innings pitched. He split 2012 between the AZL Giants and San Jose, accumulating a 2–3 record and 4.47 ERA with 37 strikeouts over 17 games (10 starts). Marte returned to San Jose for the 2013 season, compiling a 6–4 record and 3.67 ERA with 80 strikeouts in 105 1/3 innings pitched 25 games.

Marte split the 2014 season between the Double-A Richmond Flying Squirrels and Triple-A Fresno Grizzlies. In 24 games (21 starts) split between the two affiliates, he accumulated a combined 9–5 record and 4.31 ERA with 76 strikeouts across 123 1/3 innings pitched. He made 26 appearances (19 starts) for Richmond in 2015, logging a 10–6 record and 2.63 ERA with 77 strikeouts across 130 innings. Marte elected free agency following the season on November 7, 2015.

=== Pittsburgh Pirates ===
On January 4, 2016, Marte signed a minor league contract with the Pittsburgh Pirates organization. On August 30, the Pirates selected Marte's contract, adding him to their active roster. He made two appearances for Pittsburgh, tossing 3 1/3 scoreless innings with a strikeout. On September 6, Marte was designated for assignment by the Pirates. In 34 games for the Triple-A Indianapolis Indians, he logged a 3.67 ERA with 57 strikeouts and 2 saves in 73 2/3 innings of work. Marte elected free agency following the season on November 7.

=== Miami Marlins ===
On January 3, 2017, Marte signed a minor league contract with the Miami Marlins. He made 32 appearances for the Triple-A New Orleans Baby Cakes, registering a 3–5 record and 4.50 ERA with 69 strikeouts across 86 innings pitched. Marte elected free agency following the season on November 6.

=== Saraperos de Saltillo ===
On February 5, 2018, Marte signed with the Saraperos de Saltillo of the Mexican League. He made 17 total starts for Saltillo, posting a 5–5 record and 3.74 ERA with 67 strikeouts over 89 1/3 innings of work. Marte became a free agent following the season.

On April 13, 2019, Marte re-signed with Saltillo. In 14 games (13 starts) for the team, he compiled a 5–3 record and 4.97 ERA with 44 strikeouts across 70 2/3 innings pitched. Marte was released by the Saraperos on July 26.
