= Keon Broxton =

American baseball player (born 1990)

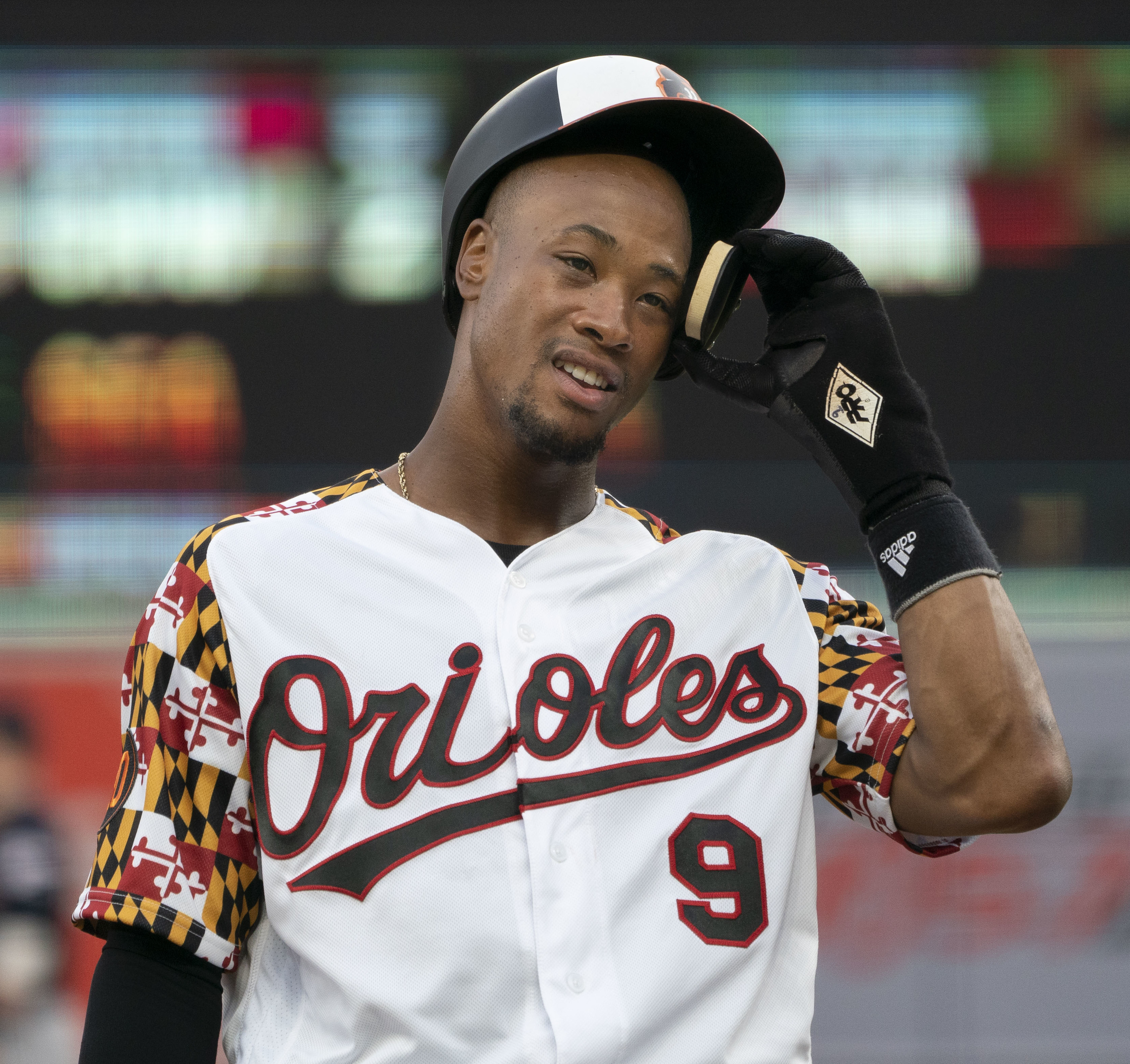
- Broxton with the Baltimore Orioles in 2019
- Outfielder
- Born: May 7, 1990 (age 35); Lakeland, Florida, U.S.
- Batted: Right Threw: Right

MLB debut
- September 21, 2015, for the Pittsburgh Pirates

Last MLB appearance
- September 28, 2019, for the Seattle Mariners

MLB statistics
- Batting average: .209
- Home runs: 39
- Runs batted in: 95
- Stolen bases: 60
- Stats at Baseball Reference

Teams
- Pittsburgh Pirates (2015); Milwaukee Brewers (2016–2018); New York Mets (2019); Baltimore Orioles (2019); Seattle Mariners (2019)

Keon Darell Broxton (born May 7, 1990) is an American former professional baseball outfielder. He played in Major League Baseball (MLB) for the Pittsburgh Pirates, Milwaukee Brewers, New York Mets, Baltimore Orioles, and Seattle Mariners.

== Playing career ==
Broxton attended Lakeland Senior High School in Lakeland, Florida. The Philadelphia Phillies selected him in the 29th round of the 2008 MLB draft. He did not sign and attended Santa Fe Community College in Gainesville, Florida to play college baseball. With Santa Fe, he appeared in the JUCO World Series.

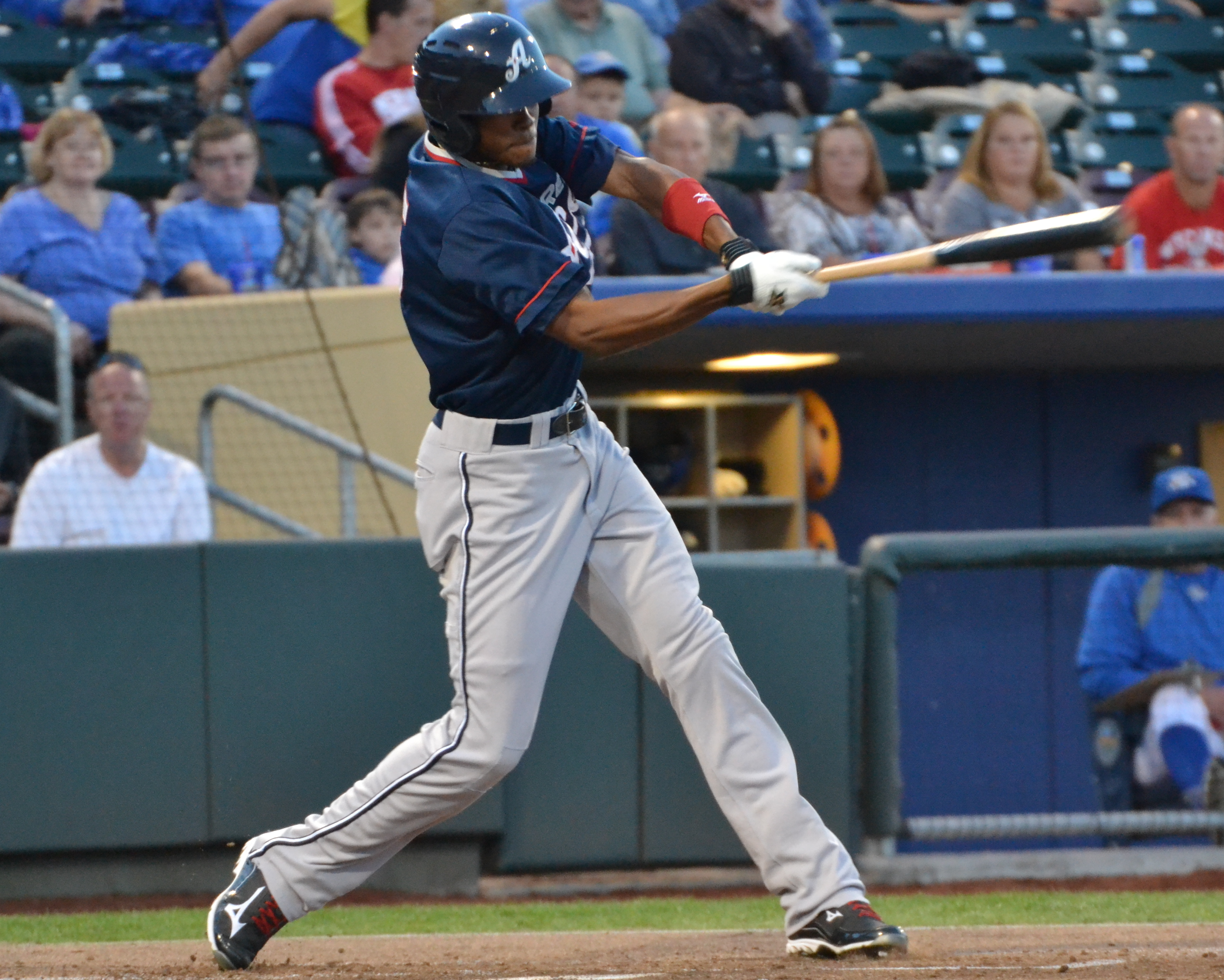
Broxton with the Reno Aces in 2012

=== Arizona Diamondbacks ===
The Arizona Diamondbacks drafted Broxton in the third round, with the 95th overall selection, of the 2009 MLB draft. Through 2012, he played for the Missoula Osprey of the Rookie-level Pioneer League, South Bend Silver Hawks of the Single-A Midwest League, and Visalia Rawhide of the High-A California League. The Diamondbacks assigned him to the Reno Aces of the Triple-A Pacific Coast League for the Triple-A National Championship Game, in which he hit a home run, helping the Aces win.

On November 19, 2012, the Diamondbacks added Broxton to their 40-man roster to protect him from the Rule 5 draft. Broxton spent the 2013 season with the Mobile BayBears of the Double-A Southern League, playing in 101 games and hitting .231/.296/.359 with eight home runs and 41 RBI. On October 3, 2013, Broxton was removed from the 40-man roster and sent outright to the Triple-A Reno Aces.

=== Pittsburgh Pirates ===
The Pittsburgh Pirates acquired Broxton from the Diamondbacks on March 27, 2014, in exchange for a player to be named later. He played for the Altoona Curve of the Double-A Eastern League in 2014. He began the 2014 season with Altoona and was promoted to the Indianapolis Indians of the Triple-A International League during the season.

The Pirates promoted Broxton to the major leagues on September 20, 2015. Broxton was used mainly as a pinch runner, going 0-for-2 at the plate, as well as one stolen base and three runs scored.

=== Milwaukee Brewers ===
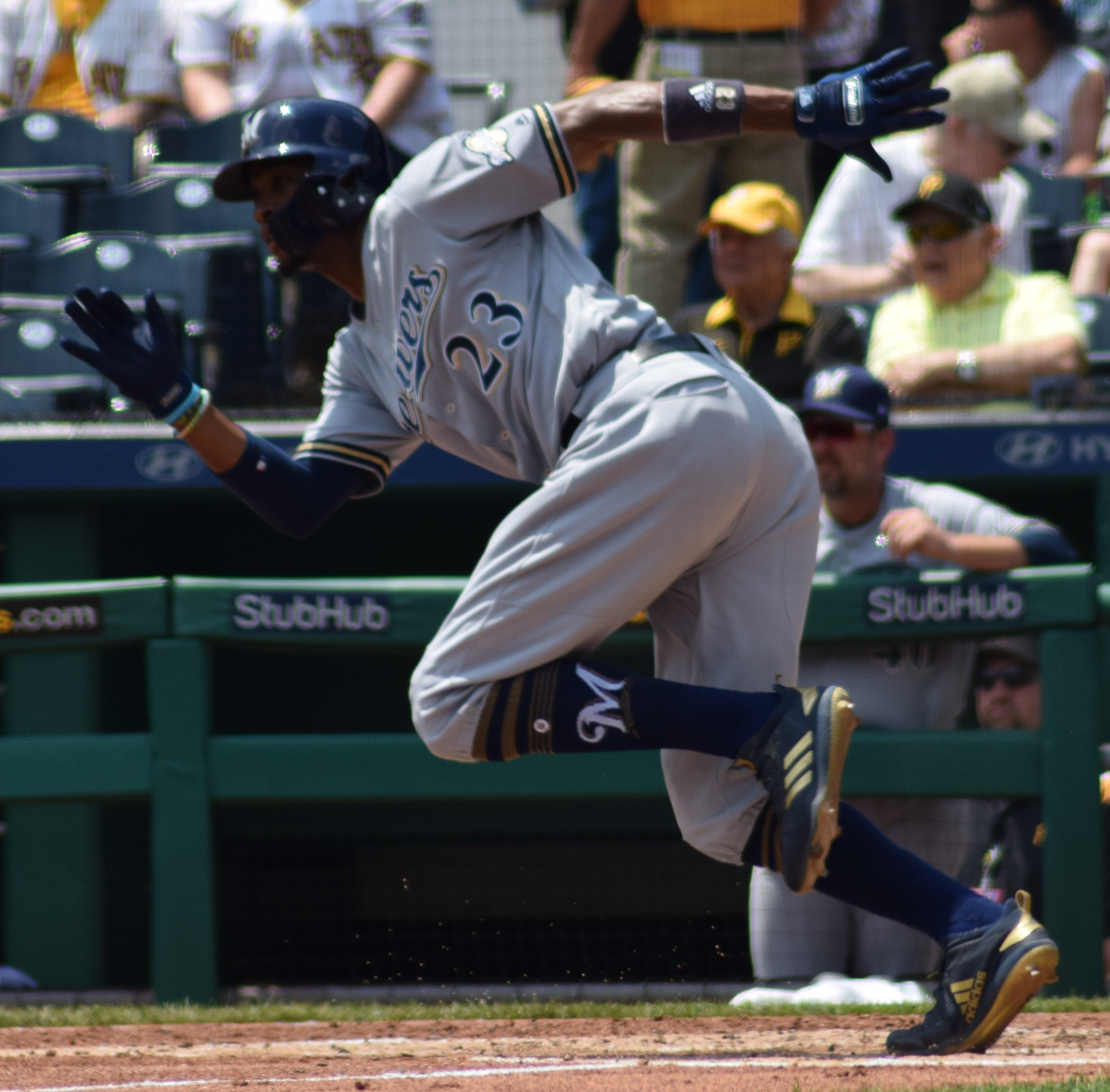
Broxton with the Milwaukee Brewers in 2018

On December 17, 2015, the Pirates traded Broxton and Trey Supak to the Milwaukee Brewers in exchange for Jason Rogers. Broxton was one of nine players competing to be the Brewers center fielder for the 2016 season. He won the competition and started on Opening Day. He had his first career multi-home run game on August 21, 2016 against the Seattle Mariners. Broxton opened the 2017 season as the Brewers starting center fielder. On July 22, he was sent down to Triple-A. In 326 plate appearances, Broxton had been hitting .218 with 14 home runs and 17 stolen bases but was leading the majors in strikeouts with 124. Broxton was recalled from the minors on August 1, and went on to put together a 20-20 season (home runs and stolen bases) and finished with a slash line of .220/.299/.420.

Broxton remained in the Brewers' minor league system with the Colorado Springs Sky Sox of the PCL to open the 2018 season, as the Brewers made significant moves in free agency in the offseason and brought in All-Star centerfielder Lorenzo Cain. Cain suffered an injury on June 26, opening a roster spot for Broxton as Cain went on the disabled list. Broxton provided strong defense, including two home run robbing catches of Minnesota Twins players in one series, and had his third multi-home run game of his MLB career against the Cincinnati Reds.

=== New York Mets ===
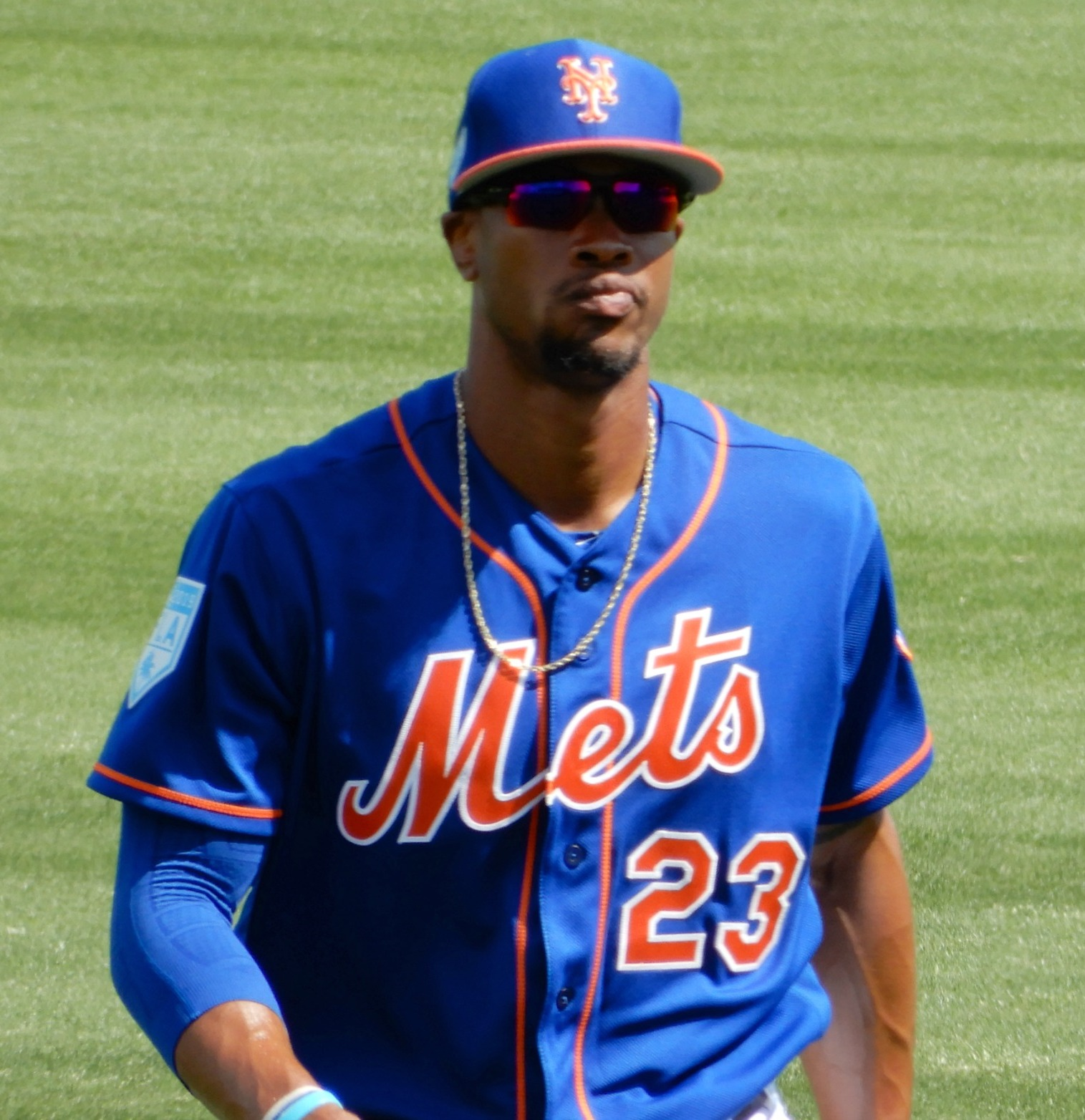
Broxton with the Mets during spring training in 2019

On January 5, 2019, the Brewers traded Broxton to the New York Mets in exchange for Bobby Wahl, Adam Hill, and Felix Valerio. He struggled during his brief stint with the team, hitting just .143 with 2 runs batted in. He was designated for assignment on May 17, 2019.

=== Baltimore Orioles ===
Broxton was traded by the Mets to the Baltimore Orioles for international signing bonus slots on May 22, 2019. He hit a two-run homer to left on the first pitch of his first Orioles plate appearance off Jeff Hoffman in an 8–6 loss to the Colorado Rockies at Coors Field two days later on May 24. Broxton's time with the Orioles lasted only two months as he was designated for assignment on July 21 due to striking out in 49 of 112 plate appearances (43.75%) and the emergence of Anthony Santander.

=== Seattle Mariners ===
He was claimed off waivers by the Seattle Mariners on July 27, 2019. On August 27, he was suspended two games and fined an undisclosed amount for throwing his batting glove at an umpire for arguing balls-and-strikes in the previous game.

=== Milwaukee Brewers (second stint) ===
On December 8, 2019, Broxton signed a minor league contract with the Milwaukee Brewers. Broxton did not play in a game in 2020 due to the cancellation of the minor league season because of the COVID-19 pandemic. Broxton became a free agent on November 2, 2020.

=== Minnesota Twins ===
On February 8, 2021, Broxton signed a minor league contract with the Minnesota Twins organization that included an invitation to Spring Training. In 73 games with the Triple-A St. Paul Saints, Broxton struggled, hitting .186 with 9 home runs and 26 RBI's. On August 19, the Twins released Broxton.

=== Milwaukee Brewers (third stint) ===
On August 31, 2021, Broxton signed a minor league deal to return to the Milwaukee Brewers. He was assigned to the Rookie Arizona Complex League Brewers Gold. Later elevated to the Triple-A Nashville Sounds, Broxton played in 15 games, but struggled to a .111/.238/.111 batting line with no home runs and one RBI. He elected free agency following the season on November 7.

=== Acereros de Monclova ===
On January 17, 2022, Broxton signed with the Acereros de Monclova of the Mexican League for the 2022 season. He played in 73 games for Monclova, hitting .356/.486/.664 with 20 home runs, 48 RBI, and 12 stolen bases.

=== Kansas City Monarchs ===
On May 8, 2023, Broxton signed with the Kansas City Monarchs of the American Association of Professional Baseball. In 35 games, he slashed .254/.382/.469 with 6 home runs, 18 RBI, and 17 stolen bases.

=== Acereros de Monclova (second stint) ===
On June 24, 2023, Broxton's contract was purchased by the Acereros de Monclova of the Mexican League. In 14 games for the Acereros, he batted .273/.369/.491 with two home runs and seven RBI. Broxton was released by Monclova on July 12.

== Coaching career ==
On May 6, 2024, Broxton was announced as an assistant coach for the Canes Tampa baseball club.

== Personal life ==
On November 4, 2016 in Tampa, Broxton was arrested for misdemeanor trespassing. Broxton, who was reportedly intoxicated, refused to leave the scene of a fight despite the warnings from responding police officers.

On July 25th, 2025, in front of more than 40,000 fans, Broxton won both rounds of an exhibition home run derby to celebrate the 25th anniversary of the Milwaukee Brewers' home ballpark, Miller Park/American Family Field, out-homering other retirees more known for their power during their careers, including Corey Hart, Ryan Braun and Prince Fielder.
