= A. J. Schugel =

American baseball player (born 1989)

- Pitcher
- Born: June 27, 1989 (age 36); Winter Haven, Florida, U.S.
- Batted: Right Threw: Right

MLB debut
- April 12, 2015, for the Arizona Diamondbacks

Last MLB appearance
- September 29, 2017, for the Pittsburgh Pirates

MLB statistics
- Win–loss record: 6–2
- Earned run average: 3.19
- Strikeouts: 78
- Stats at Baseball Reference

Teams
- Arizona Diamondbacks (2015); Pittsburgh Pirates (2016–2017)

Andrew Jeffrey Schugel (born June 27, 1989) is an American former professional baseball pitcher. He played in Major League Baseball (MLB) for the Arizona Diamondbacks and Pittsburgh Pirates.

== Early life and education ==
Schugel was born in Winter Haven, Florida, and grew up in the Denver area. His father, Jeff, is a former catcher and infielder for the Minnesota Twins, selected in the 18th round of the 1983 Major League Baseball draft. After three seasons as an active player, Jeff became a major league scout; he is currently with the Cincinnati Reds organization. Schugel's mother, Tammy, was a gymnast and hockey player in high school.

Schugel attended Mountain Vista High School in Highlands Ranch, Colorado, where, like his father, he played both hockey and baseball. He switched to baseball exclusively at Central Arizona College.

== Playing career ==
=== Los Angeles Angels ===
Schugel was drafted by the Los Angeles Angels of Anaheim in the 25th round of the 2010 Major League Baseball draft out of Central Arizona College. He made his professional debut for the rookie-level Arizona League Angels, and also appeared for the Orem Owlz, accumulating a 3.91 ERA in 17 games. In 2011, Schugel split the year between the High-A Inland Empire 66ers and the Single-A Cedar Rapids Kernels, pitching to a 5–5 record and 3.03 ERA with 95 strikeouts in 29 appearances. He spent 2012 in Double-A with the Arkansas Travelers, recording a 6–8 record and 2.89 ERA in 27 games. He spent the 2013 season in Triple-A with the Salt Lake Bees, but struggled to a 4–6 record and 7.05 ERA with 76 strikeouts in 19 appearances.

=== Arizona Diamondbacks ===
On December 13, 2013, Schugel was acquired by the Arizona Diamondbacks as the player to be named later from the trade in which they acquired Mark Trumbo. The Diamondbacks added Schugel to their 40-man roster on November 20, 2014, in order to protect him from the Rule 5 draft.

On March 31, 2015, Schugel was optioned to Triple-A Reno. But less than two weeks later, on April 12, the Diamondbacks placed catcher Gerald Laird on the disabled list and recalled Schugel. He made his MLB debut that day, pitching three innings in relief against the Los Angeles Dodgers, giving up two runs, including a homer, on five hits. He finished the season appearing in 5 games. On December 8, Schugel was designated for assignment following the signing of Zack Greinke.

=== Pittsburgh Pirates ===
On December 16, 2015, Schugel was claimed off waivers by the Seattle Mariners. On January 12, 2016, Schugel was designated for assignment by Seattle following the acquisition of Joe Wieland.

Schugel was claimed off waivers by the Pittsburgh Pirates on January 19, 2016. On February 3, Schugel was designated for assignment by the Pirates. He was sent outright the Indianapolis Indians, the Pirates Triple-A affiliate, on February 5. In his first season with the Pirates, he appeared in 36 games, posting an ERA of 3.63 in 52 innings. In 2017 with Pittsburgh, Schugel recorded a 4–0 record and a 1.97 ERA in 32 games.

Schugel began 2018 on the injured list with a shoulder injury, and was later moved to the 60-day injured list on June 27. On August 25, 2018, Schugel was activated off of the 60-day disabled list and was outrighted off of the 40-man roster. Schugel did not appear in a game with Pittsburgh in 2018, and only made 17 appearances with Indianapolis and the High-A Bradenton Marauders before he elected free agency on October 2, 2018.

=== Milwaukee Milkmen ===
On February 19, 2020, Schugel signed with the Kansas City T-Bones of the American Association of Independent Professional Baseball. The T-Bones were not selected to compete in the condensed 60-game season due to the COVID-19 pandemic. He was later drafted by the Milwaukee Milkmen in the 2020 dispersal draft. Schugel won the American Association championship with the Milkmen in 2020. After the conclusion of the season on September 18, Schugel was returned to the Kansas City T-Bones. On January 15, 2021, Schugel was traded back to the Milwaukee Milkmen in exchange for cash.

=== New York Mets ===
On May 8, 2021, Schugel signed a minor league contract with the New York Mets organization. In 16 appearances for the Triple-A Syracuse Mets, Schugel had a 1–1 record with a 5.56 ERA and 21 strikeouts. On August 9, Schugel was released by the Mets.

=== Milwaukee Milkmen (second stint) ===
On March 24, 2022, Schugel signed with the Milwaukee Milkmen of the American Association. He made 20 appearances (9 starts) for the Milkmen in 2022, posting a 4–4 record and 3.38 ERA with 50 strikeouts in 53 1/3 innings pitched.

=== Kane County Cougars ===
On April 19, 2023, Schugel was claimed off waivers by the Kane County Cougars of the American Association of Professional Baseball. He was released by the team on April 24 without appearing in a game.

=== Generales de Durango ===
On June 8, 2023, Schugel signed with the Generales de Durango of the Mexican League. In 3 starts, he posted a 1–2 record with a 8.62 ERA and 9 strikeouts in 15 2/3 innings. Schugel was waived on June 26.

=== Karachi Monarchs ===
On October 23, 2023, Schugel was selected in the fourth round by the Karachi Monarchs, with the 27th overall pick, of the 2023 Baseball United inaugural draft.

=== El Águila de Veracruz ===
On February 12, 2024, Schugel signed with the El Águila de Veracruz of the Mexican League. He made one start for Veracruz, surrendering seven runs on eight hits with four strikeouts across two innings pitched. On April 17, Schugel was released by the club.

== Coaching career ==
In 2025, Schugel was hired to be the pitching coach for the Milwaukee Milkmen of the American Association of Professional Baseball.
