= Wilfredo Boscán =

Venezuelan baseball player (born 1989)

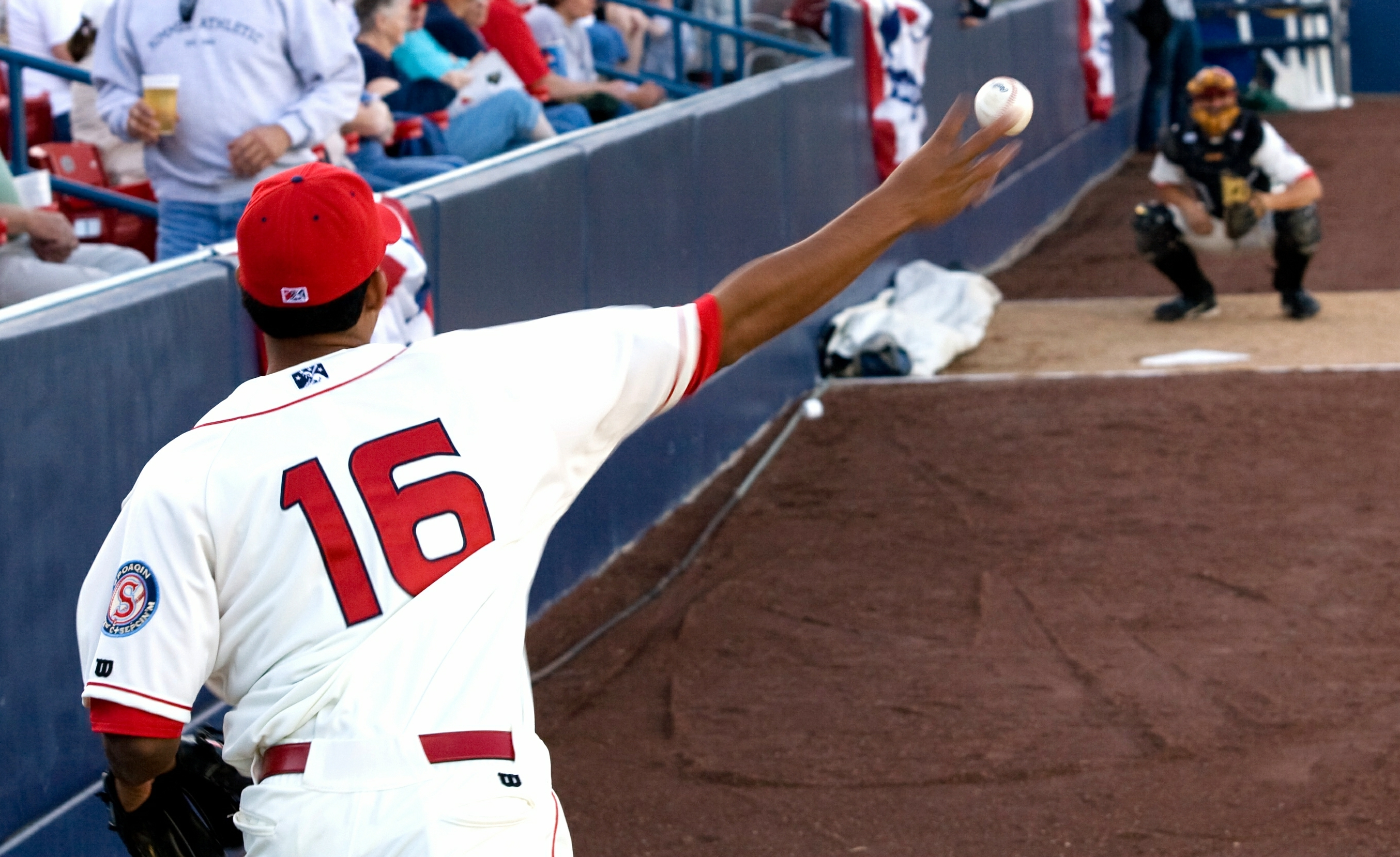
- Boscán with the Spokane Indians in 2008

Senadores de Caracas – No. 41
- Pitcher
- Born: October 26, 1989 (age 36); Maracaibo, Zulia, Venezuela
- Bats: Right Throws: Right

MLB debut
- May 19, 2016, for the Pittsburgh Pirates

MLB statistics (through 2016 season)
- Win–loss record: 1–1
- Earned run average: 6.46
- Strikeouts: 8
- Stats at Baseball Reference

Teams
- Pittsburgh Pirates (2016)

Wilfredo José Boscán Fernández (born October 26, 1989) is a Venezuelan professional baseball pitcher for the Senadores de Caracas of the Venezuelan Major League. He has previously played in Major League Baseball (MLB) for the Pittsburgh Pirates.

== Career ==
=== Texas Rangers ===
Boscán played in the Texas Rangers organization from the 2007 season to the 2012 season.

=== San Diego Padres ===
On November 28, 2012, Cory Burns was traded to the Rangers in exchange for a player to be named later. On December 6, Boscán was traded to the San Diego Padres as the unnamed player.

Boscán played in the San Diego Padres organization during the 2013 season. He became a free agent after the season.

=== Boston Red Sox ===
Boscán played in the Boston Red Sox organization during the 2014 season. He became a free agent after the season.

=== Pittsburgh Pirates ===
On December 23, 2014, Boscán signed a minor league contract with the Pittsburgh Pirates organization that included an invitation to spring training.

Boscán was called up to the majors for the first time on May 16, 2015. He was then called up a second time on July 12, and a third time on July 19. Each time, he was optioned to the Triple–A Indianapolis Indians before getting the opportunity to make his MLB debut. He was designated for assignment on August 7, after Deolis Guerra's waiver claim was voided due to injury.

Boscán made his major league debut against the Atlanta Braves on May 19, 2016, after receiving his fourth call-up. He recorded his first career win and hit on May 23 against the Colorado Rockies. In 6 major league games for Pittsburgh, Boscán posted a 6.46 ERA with 8 strikeouts in 15 1/3 innings pitched. On August 4, Boscán was released by the Pirates after Ryan Vogelsong was activated from the disabled list.

=== Atlanta Braves ===
On August 10, 2016, Boscán was claimed off waivers by the Atlanta Braves. On September 2, Boscán was removed from the 40-man roster and sent outright to the Triple–A Gwinnett Braves. In 3 games for Gwinnett, he recorded an 0–2 record and 8.00 ERA with 9 strikeouts.

=== New York Mets ===
On February 19, 2017, Boscán signed a minor league contract with the New York Mets organization. In 26 starts for the Triple–A Las Vegas 51s, Boscán registered a 4–13 record and 5.44 ERA with 72 strikeouts in 125 2/3 innings pitched. He elected free agency following the season on November 6.

=== Tigres de Quintana Roo ===
On April 25, 2019, Boscán signed with the Tigres de Quintana Roo of the Mexican League. Boscán did not play in a game in 2020 due to the cancellation of the Mexican League season because of the COVID-19 pandemic. He was released on December 9, 2021.

=== Dorados de Chihuahua ===
On February 6, 2024, after two years of inactivity, Boscán signed with the Dorados de Chihuahua of the Mexican League. In 10 games (8 starts) for Chihuahua, he struggled to an 8.13 ERA with 24 strikeouts across 34 1/3 innings pitched. Boscán was released by the Dorados on June 26.

=== Conspiradores de Querétaro ===
On July 5, 2024, Boscán signed with the Conspiradores de Querétaro of the Mexican League. In 5 games (4 starts) for Querétaro, he compiled a 2-2 record and 6.11 ERA with 8 strikeouts across 17 2/3 innings pitched.

Boscán made two starts for the Conspiradores in 2025, struggling to an 0-1 record and 20.25 ERA with six strikeouts over 5 1/3 innings of work. Boscán was released by Querétaro on April 30, 2025.

=== Rieleros de Aguascalientes ===
On May 2, 2025, Boscán signed with the Rieleros de Aguascalientes of the Mexican League. In three appearances for Aguascalientes, he struggled to an 0-1 record and 7.50 ERA with two strikeouts over six innings pitched. Boscán was released by the Rieleros on May 10.

=== Senadores de Caracas ===
On June 9, 2025, Boscan signed with the Senadores de Caracas of the Venezuelan Major League.

== International career ==
On October 12, 2011, Wilfredo made his debut with the Águilas del Zulia organization in the Venezuelan Professional Baseball League (by its Spanish acronym). Currently he becomes to Navegantes del Magallanes since 2018 from a change.

== See also ==
- List of Major League Baseball players from Venezuela
