= Pedro Florimón =

Dominican baseball player (born 1986)

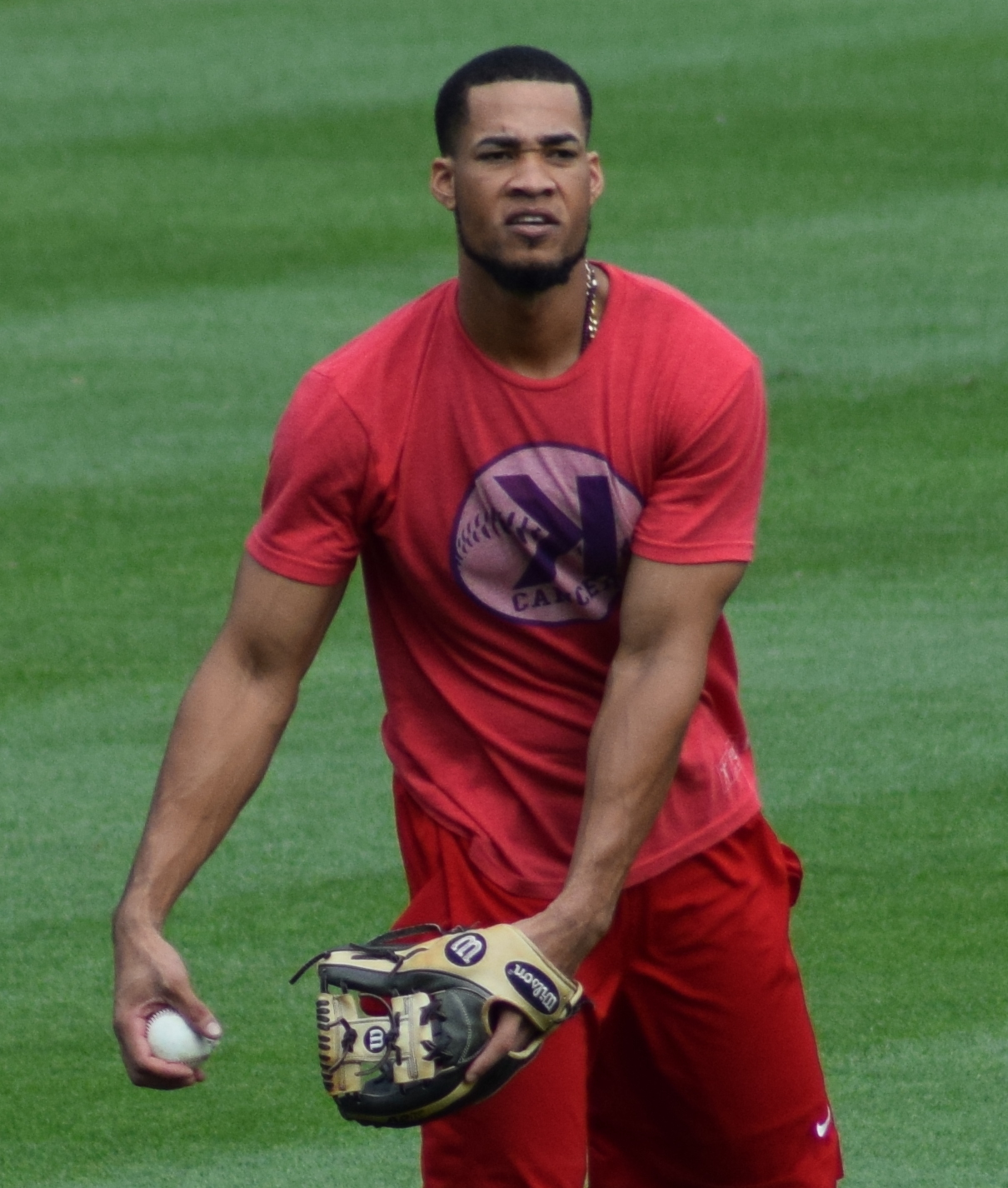
- Florimón at Citizens Bank Park in 2018
- Shortstop
- Born: December 10, 1986 (age 39); La Romana, Dominican Republic
- Batted: Switch Threw: Right

MLB debut
- September 10, 2011, for the Baltimore Orioles

Last MLB appearance
- September 27, 2018, for the Philadelphia Phillies

MLB statistics
- Batting average: .211
- Home runs: 12
- Runs batted in: 73
- Stats at Baseball Reference

Teams
- Baltimore Orioles (2011); Minnesota Twins (2012–2014); Pittsburgh Pirates (2015–2016); Philadelphia Phillies (2017–2018)

Pedro Alexander Florimón Jr. (born December 10, 1986) is a Dominican former professional baseball shortstop. He played in Major League Baseball (MLB) for the Baltimore Orioles, Minnesota Twins, Pittsburgh Pirates, and Philadelphia Phillies. In 2004, Florimón was signed by the Orioles, as an undrafted free agent. He made his MLB debut, in 2011.

== Personal life ==
Florimón was born in La Romana, Dominican Republic, which he described as a "medium-sized" town. His favorite Major League Baseball player is Omar Vizquel.

== Professional career ==
=== Baltimore Orioles ===
Florimón was signed by the Baltimore Orioles as a non-drafted free agent on June 18, 2004. He played for the Dominican Summer League Orioles in 2004 and 2005.

In 2006, he played for the rookie-level Bluefield Orioles, and the Low–A Aberdeen IronBirds. With Bluefield, he batted .333 with 23 runs, 40 hits, six doubles, one triple, one home run, eight RBI, and seven stolen bases in 33 games. He led Bluefield in stolen bases and caught stealings (six); and was second in walks (28) and batting average. With the IronBirds, he batted .248 with 13 runs, 26 hits, four doubles, one triple, and five RBI in 26 games. In 2007, he spent the entire season with the Single–A Delmarva Shorebirds and batted .197 with 50 runs, 73 hits, 14 doubles, one triple, four home runs, 34 RBI, and 16 stolen bases in 111 games.

The next season, Florimón again played for the Single–A Delmarva. In 81 games, he batted .223 with 28 runs, 60 hits, 18 doubles, one triple, 19 RBI, and 13 stolen bases. In 2009, Florimón spent most of the season with the High–A Frederick Keys of the Carolina League; however, he spent some of the season with the Double–A Bowie Baysox of the Eastern League. With the Keys, he batted .267 with 76 runs, 115 hits, 32 doubles, five triples, nine home runs, 68 RBI, and 26 stolen bases in 115 games. On the team, Florimón was first in triples; second in runs, stolen bases, and caught stealing (nine); and was third in RBI, and bases on balls (42). Florimón was selected to the Carolina League mid-season All-Star game. He was also named the Carolina League's Player of the Week for the week of August 17–23. Florimón played seven games with the Baysox, and batted .091 with two hits and one RBI. On November 19, the Orioles added Florimón to their 40-man roster to protect him from the Rule 5 draft. He was re-signed by the Orioles on March 9.

Florimón spent spring training with the Orioles until March 26, when he was assigned to Double–A Bowie. On May 26, he was placed on the seven-day disabled list. He made his major league debut with the Orioles on September 10.

=== Minnesota Twins ===
On December 5, 2011, Florimón was claimed off waivers by the Minnesota Twins. In 2012, Florimón played in 43 games for the Twins, amassing 137 at-bats. He hit .219 with one home run and 10 RBI.

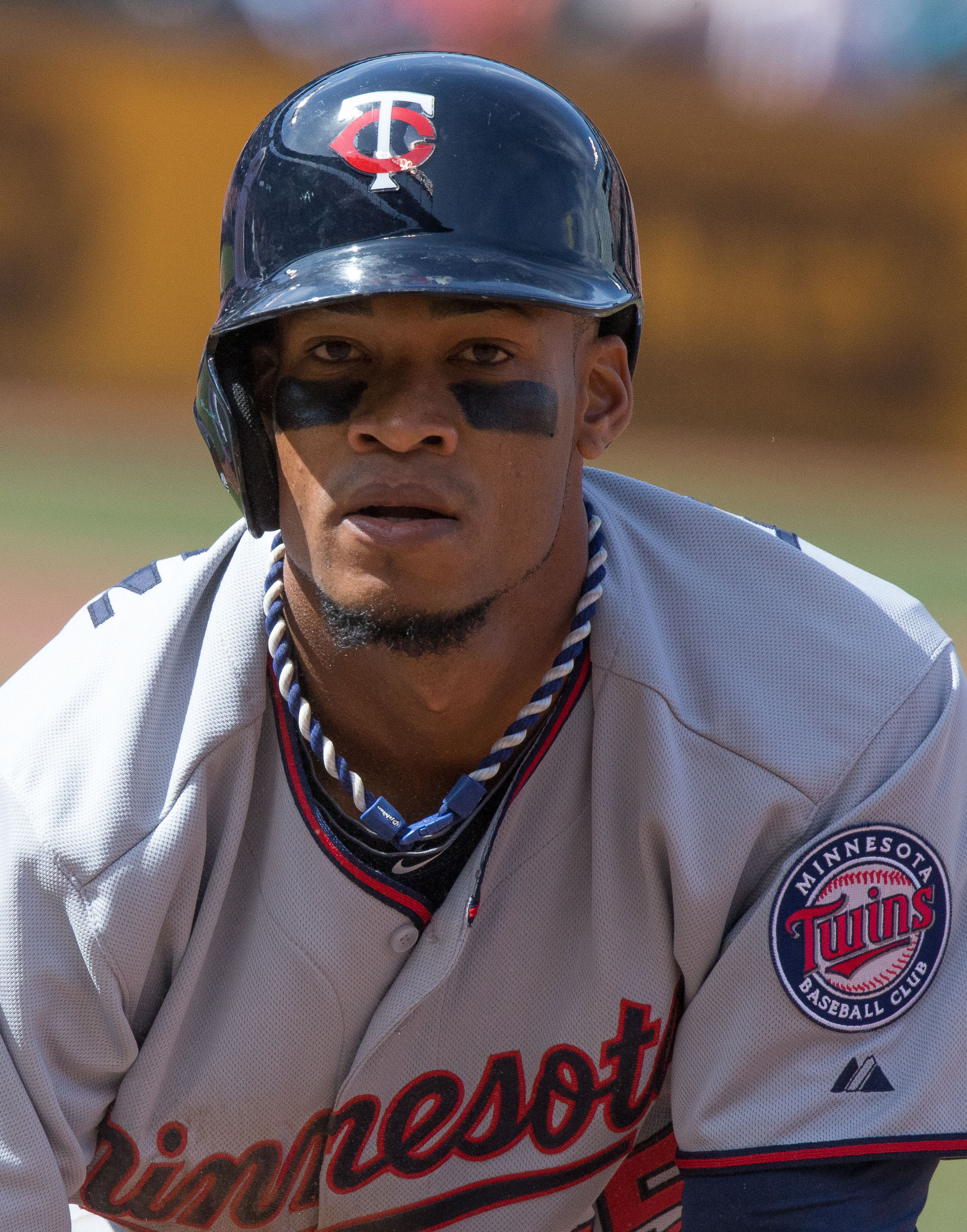
Florimón in 2015

The next season, Florimón competed for the starting shortstop position, which he won by default. In 2012, in 137 at-bats he batted .219/.272/.307.

Florimón opened the 2013 season as the starting shortstop for the Twins. Despite his strong defensive play at shortstop, Florimón struggled mightily at the plate. In 443 at-bats, he hit .221 with nine home runs, stole 15 bases in 21 attempts, and walked 33 times while striking out 115 times.

For the 2014 season, Florimón was anointed the starting shortstop once again, but lasted just 33 games before being demoted the Rochester Red Wings of the Triple–A International League. During his brief stint at the beginning of the season, Florimón hit under the Mendoza line (.092) as he collected just seven hits in his 76 at-bats for Minnesota. He finished the season with Rochester without receiving a September call-up.

=== Pittsburgh Pirates ===
On September 18, 2014, the Washington Nationals claimed Florimón from the Twins off of waivers. On November 20, the Pittsburgh Pirates claimed Florimón off waivers from the Nationals.

Florimón was designated for assignment on April 5, 2015. On April 11, he cleared waivers and was sent outright to the Triple–A Indianapolis Indians. On July 22, Florimón was called up and made his season debut as the starting shortstop. Three days later on July 25, he switched his uniform number from 17 to 23 to accommodate the newly acquired Aramis Ramírez so Ramírez could wear number 17 since his longtime uniform number 16 was already being worn by first base coach Nick Leyva. On August 18, Florimón hit a walk-off triple against the Arizona Diamondbacks to give Bucs a 9–8 win in the 15th. The 2015 Season saw Florimon wear 3 different uniform numbers: 17 (July 22 – July 24), 23 (July 25 – August 19) and 51 (September 2 - end of the season).

On November 2, 2016, Florimón was removed from the 40–man roster and sent outright to Indianapolis, after which he subsequently elected free agency.

=== Philadelphia Phillies ===
On December 12, 2016, Florimón signed a minor league contract with the Philadelphia Phillies organization. He was called up by the Phillies on August 17, 2017, making his Phillies debut in the outfield. He suffered a broken ankle September 2 against the Miami Marlins after rolling and dislocating his right ankle while crossing first base legging out an infield single. For the season, in 46 at-bats he batted .348/.388/.478. Florimón re–signed with Philadelphia on a minor league contract on November 13.

Florimón began the 2018 season playing for the Phillies, but on May 29 he fouled a ball off his right foot and broke it, and was put on the disabled list. He was batting .263/.323/.491 in 57 at-bats at the time, and had played for the Phillies at shortstop, pitcher, right field, center field, and third base. For the season, he batted .225/.276/.423, with two home runs and five RBI in 71 at-bats.

=== Atlanta Braves ===
On November 26, 2018, Florimón signed a minor league contract with the Atlanta Braves that included an invitation to spring training. He spent the 2019 season with the Triple–A Gwinnett Stripers, playing in 120 games and slashing .265/.358/.410 with 12 home runs and 68 RBI. Florimón elected free agency following the season on November 4, 2019.

=== San Diego Padres ===
On January 18, 2021, after a year of inactivity, Florimón signed a minor league contract with the San Diego Padres organization. He elected free agency on November 7, 2021.

=== Algodoneros de Unión Laguna ===
On April 13, 2022, Florimón signed with the Algodoneros de Unión Laguna of the Mexican League. In 14 games, he hit .292/.433/.313 with 14 hits and three RBI. Florimón was released by Unión Laguna on May 10.

== Coaching career ==
On January 31, 2025, the Pittsburgh Pirates hired Florimón as the development coach for their Low-A affiliate, the Bradenton Marauders. In 2026, Florimón was named as development coach for the Pirates High-A affiliate Greensboro Grasshoppers.

== Scouting report ==
Scout.com opined that Florimón has trouble hitting a breaking ball, and that he often looks "lost at the plate." However, they also stated that he has "impressive plate discipline, if all he is seeing are fastballs." The site also described him as a "plus runner."
