= Jason Rogers (baseball) =

American baseball player (born 1988)

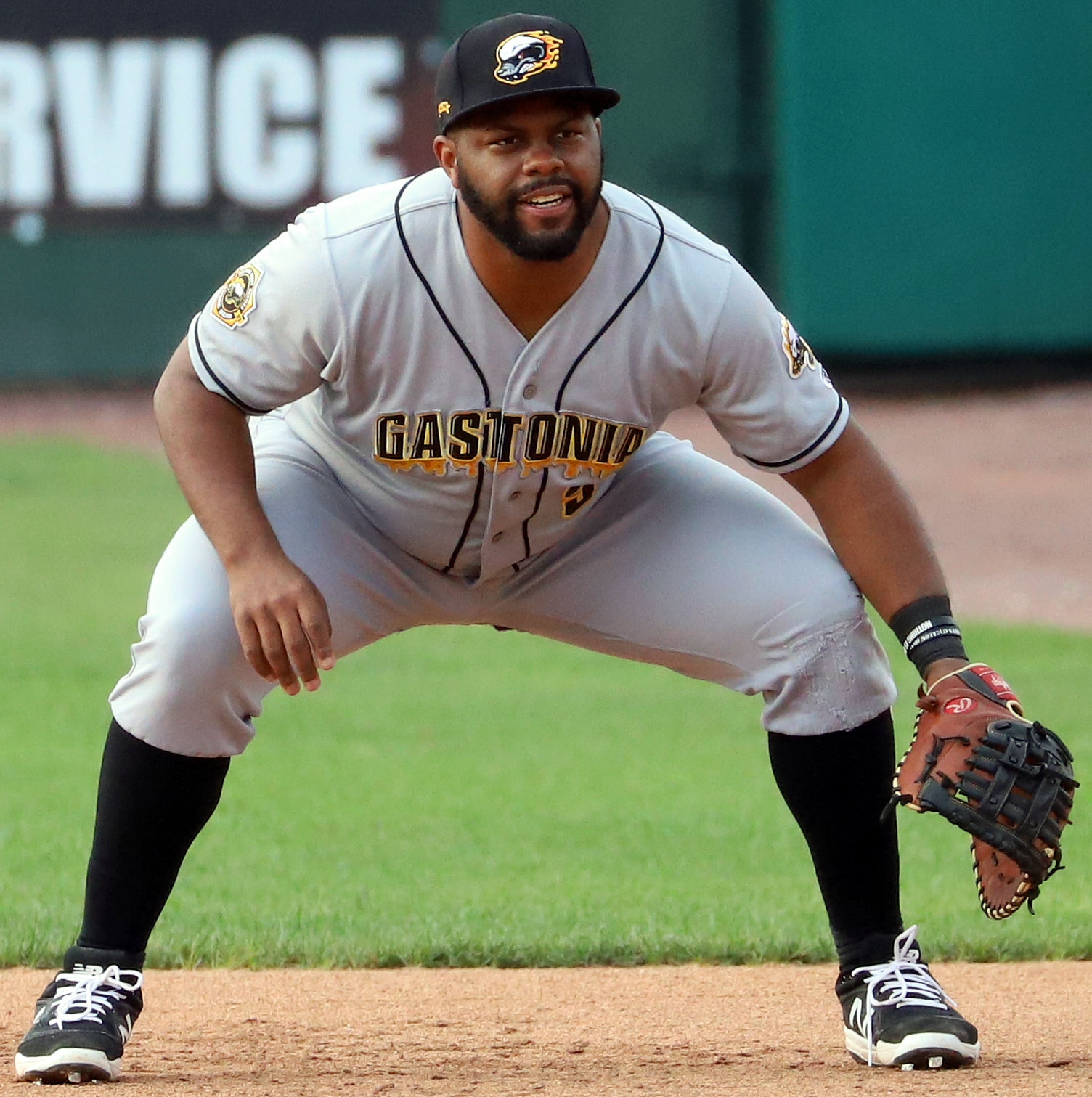
- Rogers with the Gastonia Honey Hunters in 2021
- First baseman
- Born: March 13, 1988 (age 37); East Point, Georgia, U.S.
- Batted: Right Threw: Right

Professional debut
- MLB: September 2, 2014, for the Milwaukee Brewers
- NPB: July 18, 2017, for the Hanshin Tigers

Last appearance
- MLB: October 2, 2016, for the Pittsburgh Pirates
- MLB: September 25, 2017, for the Hanshin Tigers

MLB statistics
- Batting average: .258
- Home runs: 4
- Runs batted in: 18

NPB statistics
- Batting average: .252
- Home runs: 5
- Runs batted in: 23
- Stats at Baseball Reference

Teams
- Milwaukee Brewers (2014–2015); Pittsburgh Pirates (2016); Hanshin Tigers (2017)

Jason Douglas Rogers (born March 13, 1988) is an American former professional baseball first baseman. He played in Major League Baseball (MLB) for the Milwaukee Brewers and Pittsburgh Pirates and in Nippon Professional Baseball (NPB) for the Hanshin Tigers.

== Career ==
=== Milwaukee Brewers ===
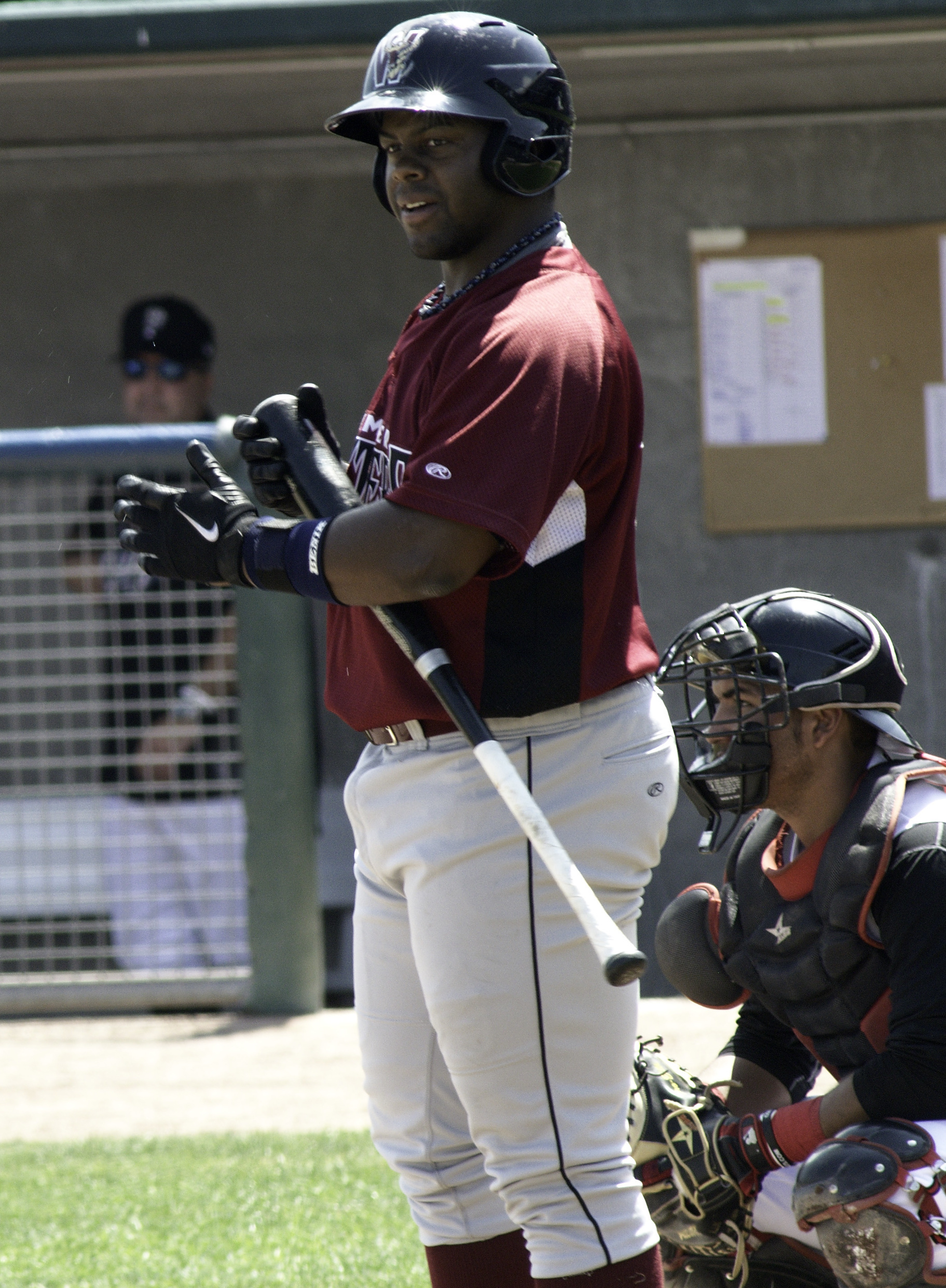
Rogers with the Wisconsin Timber Rattlers in 2011

Rogers was drafted by the Milwaukee Brewers in the 32nd round of the 2010 Major League Baseball draft out of Columbus State University. In 2013, he was the Brewers' Minor League Player of the Year after hitting .270/.346/.468 with 22 home runs. He was added to the 40-man roster on November 20, 2013. Primarily a first baseman, Rogers added third base as a secondary position prior to the 2014 season.

Rogers made his major league debut on September 2, 2014. On May 9, 2015, Rogers hit his first career home run, a three-run shot off of Chicago Cubs relief pitcher Phil Coke. He hit his second homer off of Francisco Liriano on June 9. In 86 games for Milwaukee in 2015, Rogers slashed .296/.367/.441 with 4 home runs and 16 RBI.

=== Pittsburgh Pirates ===
On December 17, 2015, Rogers was traded to the Pittsburgh Pirates for Keon Broxton and minor leaguer Trey Supak. After hitting .080/.303/.160, Rogers was designated for assignment on December 23, 2016. He was released on June 30, 2017 after beginning the year with the Triple-A Indianapolis Indians.

=== Hanshin Tigers ===
On July 7, 2017, Rogers signed with the Hanshin Tigers of Nippon Professional Baseball (NPB). Rogers hit .252/.329/.431 with 5 home runs and 23 RBI for the Tigers in 2017.

=== New Britain Bees ===
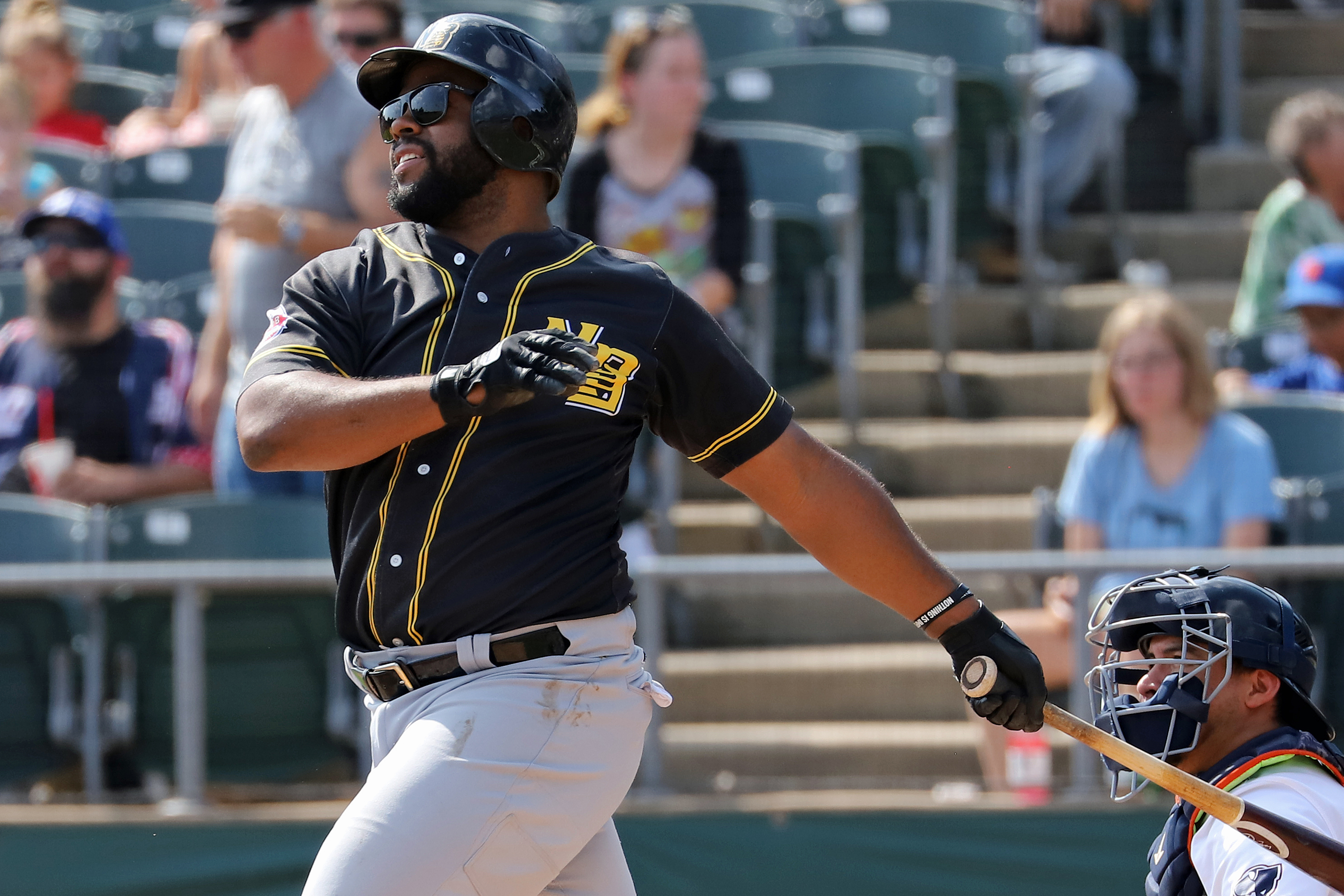
Jason Rogers solo home run in top of 4th inning. New Britain Bees September 22, 2019

On April 6, 2018, Rogers signed with the Kansas City T-Bones of the American Association. On May 15, 2018, he was traded to the New Britain Bees of the Atlantic League of Professional Baseball. He became a free agent following the 2018 season. On January 3, 2019 The Blue Sox Facebook page announced Rogers was signed for the rest of the 2018/19 ABL season. On April 2, 2019, Rogers re-signed with the New Britain Bees for the 2019 season.

On November 6, 2019, Rogers was selected by the Somerset Patriots in the New Britain Bees dispersal draft. He didn't appear in a game for the club, as the season was canceled due to the COVID-19 pandemic. On June 29, 2020, Rogers's contract was purchased by the Olmecas de Tabasco of the Mexican League for the 2021 season. He participated in preseason with the club, but did not make the Opening Day roster.

=== Gastonia Honey Hunters ===
On May 27, 2021, Rogers signed with the Gastonia Honey Hunters of the Atlantic League of Professional Baseball. Rogers hit .317/.468/.517 with 3 home runs and 12 RBI in 17 games for the team before being released on June 19.

=== Algodoneros de Unión Laguna ===
On June 19, 2021, Rogers signed with the Algodoneros de Unión Laguna of the Mexican League. In 12 games, Rogers slashed .182/.265/.318 with 2 home runs and 4 RBIs. He was released by the team on July 5.

=== Gastonia Honey Hunters (second stint) ===
On July 9, 2021, Rogers re-signed with the Gastonia Honey Hunters of the Atlantic League of Professional Baseball. He became a free agent following the season.

=== Lincoln Saltdogs ===
On January 21, 2022, Rogers signed with the Lincoln Saltdogs of the American Association, taking on the role of a player-coach.

In 2023, Rogers played in 34 games for Lincoln, batting .300/.459/.436 with 2 home runs and 21 RBI.

=== Gastonia Honey Hunters (third stint) ===
On September 12, 2023, Rogers was traded to the Gastonia Honey Hunters of the Atlantic League of Professional Baseball in exchange for a player to be named later. In two games for Gastonia, he went 2–for–5 (.400) with two RBI and two walks.

=== Lincoln Saltdogs ===
On October 3, 2023, Rogers was traded back to the Lincoln Saltdogs of the American Association of Professional Baseball to complete a previous transaction. Rogers became a free agent at the end of the 2023 season.
