= 2012 Houston Astros season =

51st season for the baseball franchise, final in National League

2012 Houston Astros
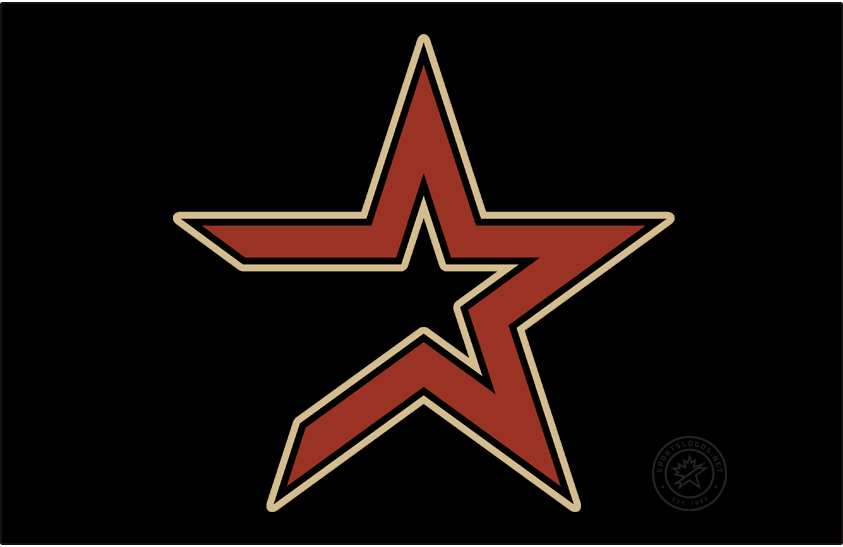
- League: National League
- Division: Central
- Ballpark: Minute Maid Park
- City: Houston, Texas
- Record: 55–107 (.340)
- Divisional place: 6th
- Owners: Jim Crane
- General managers: Jeff Luhnow
- Managers: Brad Mills; Tony DeFrancesco (interim)
- Television: Fox Sports Houston (Bill Brown, Jim Deshaies)
- Radio: KTRH (Milo Hamilton, Brett Dolan, Dave Raymond); KLAT (Spanish) (Francisco Romero, Alex Treviño)
- Stats: ESPN.com; Baseball Reference

The 2012 Houston Astros season was the 51st season for the Major League Baseball (MLB) franchise located in Houston, Texas, their 48th as the Astros, 51st in the National League (NL), 19th in the NL Central division, and 13th at Minute Maid Park, The Astros entered the season as having finished in last place in the NL Central with 56–106 record and 37 1/2 games behind, the first time in franchise history they had lost at least 100 games.

The 2012 season was the Astros' final season as members of the National League. Per the approval of the sale of the team from Drayton McLane to Jim Crane by the league, the Astros agreed to move to the American League (AL), and to be situated in the American League West division, effective the following year. It was also the first season with Jeff Luhnow serving as general manager. On April 6, pitcher Wandy Rodríguez made the Opening Day start for the Astros, who hosted the Colorado Rockies, but were defeated, 5–3.

Second baseman Jose Altuve was selected to the MLB All-Star Game for the first time in his career, and played for the National League. In the first round of the June MLB draft, the Astros chose shortstop Carlos Correa as the first overall pick, and pitcher Lance McCullers Jr. at number 41.

On August 18, manager Brad Mills was relieved of his duties and Tony DeFrancesco served in his stead as interim manager. The Astros concluded their season and NL tenure with a 5–4, walk-off defeat to the Chicago Cubs. Houston ranked in last place in the NL Central with a 55–107 record, 42 games behind the division-champion Cincinnati Reds. At the time, it established a new worst-record in franchise history, breaking the record set the season before, while being just the second year in which Houston had lost 100 or more games.

== Offseason ==
The Astros concluded the 2011 campaign with a 56–106 (.346) record, for sixth and last place within the NL Central division trailing the division-champion Milwaukee Brewers by 40 games, for the most defeats in the major leagues. The 106 losses represented a new club record for their first 100-loss season, surpassing 97 losses each during the 1965, 1975 and 1991 campaigns. In congruence with a period of transition for the franchise, on May 16, 2011, the club announced their sale from Drayton McLane to a group of investors headed by Jim Crane for the price of $680 million ($973.2 million), which, at the time qualified for the second-highest transaction for an MLB franchise, trailing $845-million ($1,209.4 million),purchase of the Chicago Cubs by the family trust of Joe Ricketts in 2009.

== Regular season ==
=== Summary ===
==== April ====
To pay homage and celebrate the 50th anniversary of the Houston Astros franchise, the players donned retro Colt .45s jerseys for play on April 10 and April 20. During the 1962, 1963, and 1964 seasons, Houston played as the Colt .45s prior to being renamed the Astros in 1965.

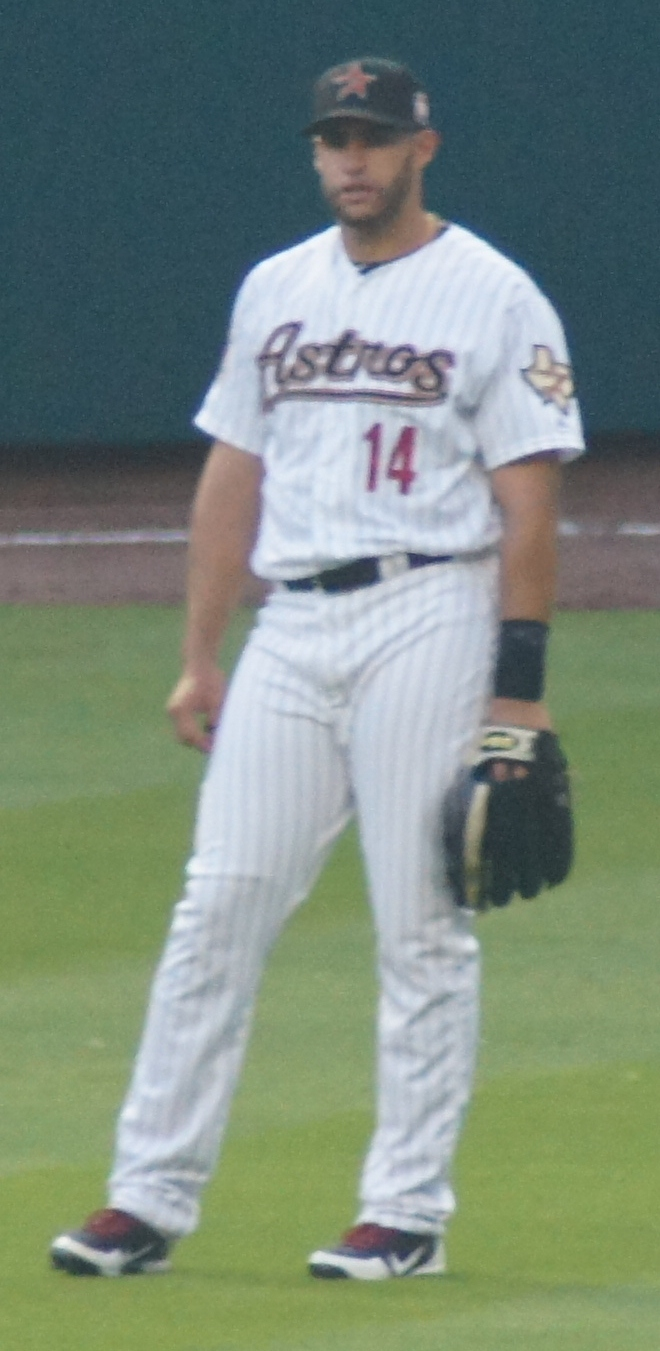
J. D. Martinez with Houston in 2012.

Opening Day starting lineup
Uniform	Player	Position
1	Jordan Schafer	Center fielder
27	Jose Altuve	Second baseman
14	J. D. Martinez	Left fielder
45	Carlos Lee	First baseman
19	Brian Bogusevic	Right fielder
23	Chris Johnson	Third baseman
15	Jason Castro	Catcher
9	Marwin González	Shortstop
51	Wandy Rodríguez	Pitcher
Venue: Minute Maid Park • Final: Colorado 5, Houston 3 Sources:

On April 6, the Astros hosted the Colorado Rockies for Opening Day, as Wandy Rodríguez made the start for the Astros. Rodríguez worked 6 1/3 innings, allowed six hits, two walks and three runs. However, none of the runs charged to Rodríguez were earned as the Astros committed four errors on the way to a 5–3 defeat. In the bottom off the first inning, Jose Altuve drew a base on balls and, two batters later, scored when Carlos Lee lined a single to center field. Rockies starter Jeremy Guthrie tossed seven inning with the runs allowed to earn the victory. Colorado scored the three unearned runs in the third inning, when Rodríguez, fielding Dexter Fowler's sacrifice bunt, committed a throwing error.

On April 13, Miami native J. D. Martinez hit the first-ever home run in the newly-opened Marlins Park. With a runner on in the eighth, he hit an Edward Mujica offering into the Clevelander Bar beyond the left-field wall to tie the contest with the team in their first season having been rebranded the Miami Marlins. Lucas Harrell also uncorked the first wild pitch at Marlins Park during this game.

Right-hander Bud Norris assembled a four-strikeout inning on April 24, the fourth in club history.

Jose Altuve produced his first career four-hit game on April 25, scored thrice, doubled and drove in a run. J. D. Martinez and Brian Bogusevic also doubled, and Martinez collected three hits and three RBI. Wilton López (2–0) worked a scoreless sixth inning to earn the victory, David Carpenter (1) and Wesley Wright (2) each were credited with holds, and Brett Myers earned the save (3).

==== May ====
As of May 25, following a four-game winning streak, the Astros' record stood at 22–23 (.489). Houston trailed the first-place Cincinnati Reds by four games.

==== June ====
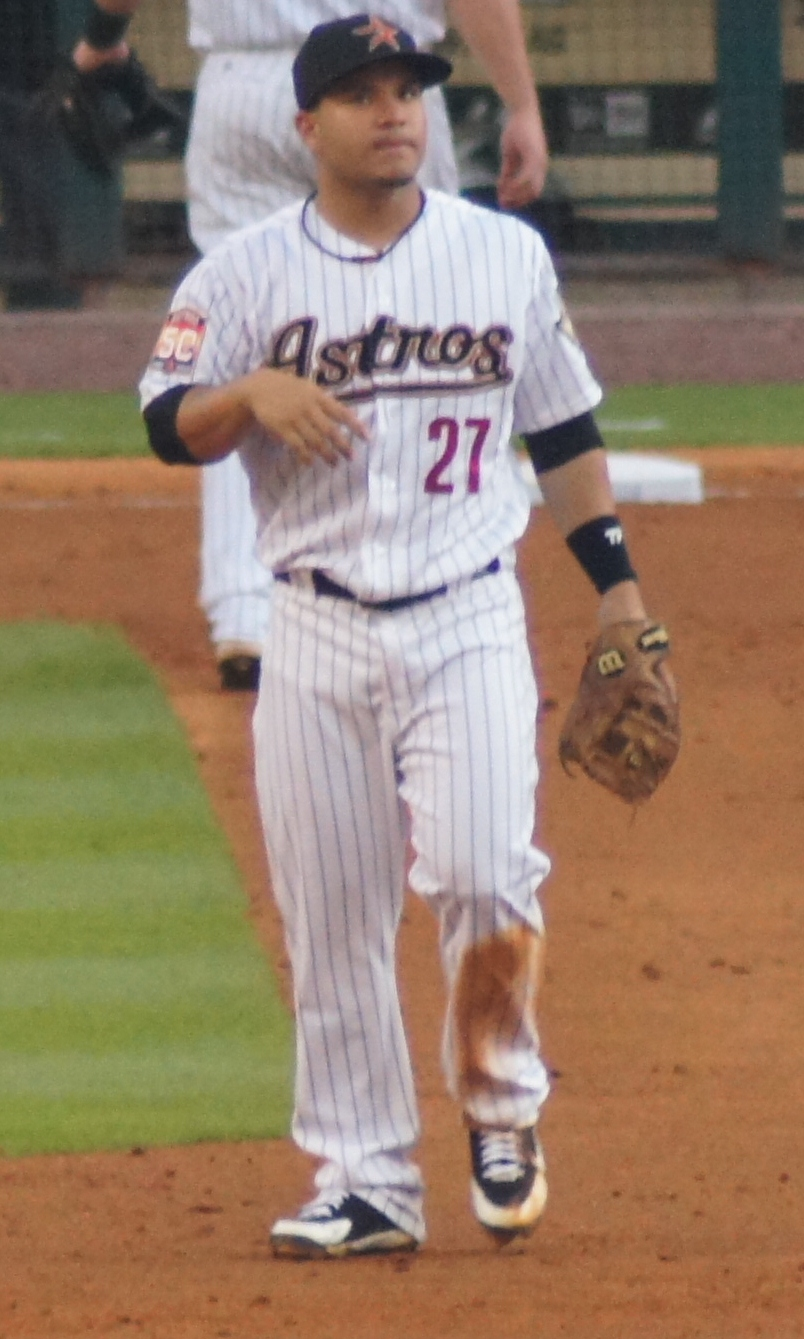
Second baseman Jose Altuve, All-Star in 2012.

Coming off their first 100-loss season in club history, the Astros' record on June 13 looked on track for to dip below that threshold as it had stood at 26–36 (.419) prior to play versus the San Francisco Giants. However, starter Matt Cain tossed the first perfect game for San Francisco to defeat the Astros, 10–0. Two of Jordan Schafer's at bats represented Houston's closest opportunities to escape history at their expense. In the fourth, Schafer stung a liner past first baseman Brandon Belt that was called foul, but struck out after ten pitches. In the seventh, he smoked a line drive into right-center that Gregor Blanco snagged on a spectacular, fully-extended diving play. Jason Castro, Houston's 27th batter in the top of the ninth inning, grounded out to Joaquín Arias for the final out of the game. In parallel, this was the first time in Astros' franchise history that no batters reached base safely, and the first time they had been no-hit since Carlos Zambrano did so on September 14, 2008, for the Chicago Cubs. It the fifth time overall the Astros had been no-hit and second by the Giants. The Astros' performance slumped, going 29–81 (.264) the rest of the way.

Dallas Keuchel made his major league debut on June 17. He tossed five innings against the Texas Rangers, allowing four hits, four walks, one hit and one run. His first strikeout was of Brandon Snyder swinging in the second inning. The Rangers scored 7 times in the bottom of the sixth inning on the way to a 9–3 win over Houston. Astros pitching yielded 12 hits and 9 bases on balls.

On June 23, Dallas Keuchel earned both his first major league victory and complete game, in his second major league start. J. D. Martinez (8), Jordan Schafer (3), and Jose Altuve (5) all homered in support as the Astros cruised to an 8–1 win over the Cleveland Indians. Keuchel scattered six hits, one walk, struck out three, and obtained a game score of 73.

==== MLB All-Star Game ====
Jose Altuve was selected to represent the Astros for his first MLB All-Star Game, hosted at Kauffman Stadium in Kansas City, Missouri. Altuve replaced Dan Uggla, faced Jim Johnson during the top of the eighth inning for his lone plate appearance, and was retired on a groundout. The National League won, 8–0.

==== September—October ====
The Astros hosted the St. Louis Cardinals on September 26 for their final home contest as a National League club, and won, 2–0, behind Bud Norris' 7 1/3 two-hit gem. Norris (6–13), who fanned seven and issued no walks, earned a game score of 81. During the bottom of the fourth inning, Jose Altuve's deep blast (6) off Cardinals ace Chris Carpenter (0–1) snapped a scoreless tie. Brett Wallace also singled home a run for Houston. Wilton López closed out the contest for the final 1 2/3 innings to convert the save (8). The victory snapped a personal 12-game losing streak for Norris, who won for the first time since May 21 earlier in the season.

The Astros played their final bout as a National League team on October 3, 2012, at Wrigley Field. Édgar González was Houston's starting pitcher, opposite of Chicago's Travis Wood. Justin Maxwell doubled and homered—also Houston's final home run in the NL. Leading off the top of the ninth with the score tied, 4–4, Jimmy Paredes singled off Carlos Mármol for Houston's final NL hit; however, Mármol fanned Tyler Greene looking to close the Astros' half of the ninth and the team's final NL at bat. The contest ended in a walk-off victory for the Cubs, when in the bottom of the ninth inning, Bryan LaHair singled home Darwin Barney off Héctor Ambriz (1–1) for a 5–4 Cubs win, handing Ambriz the defeat.

==== Performance overview ====
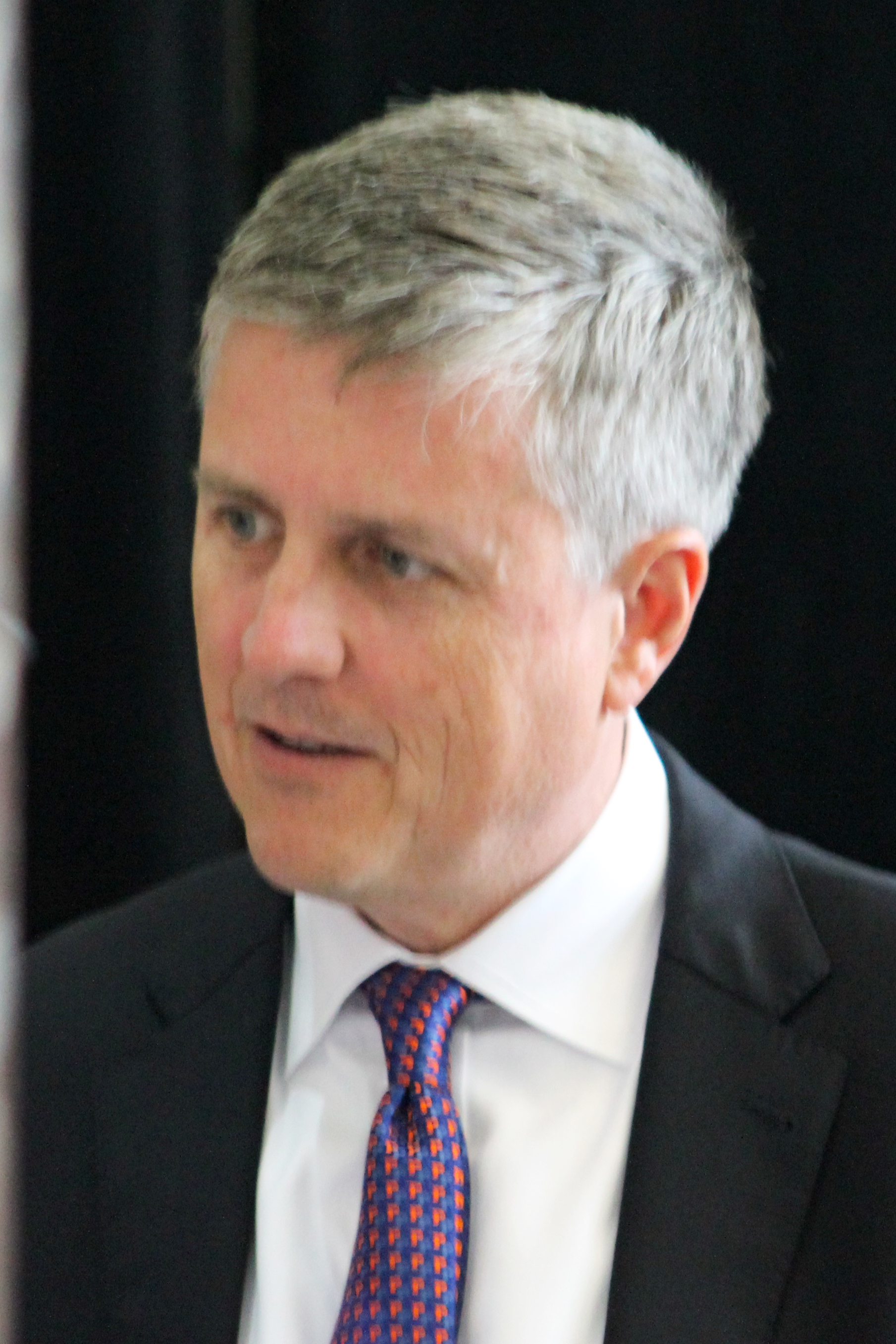
The Astros hired Jeff Luhnow as general manager prior to the 2012 season, succeeding Ed Wade.

After May 25, the Astros played to a 32–84 (.276) record. For the second consecutive season, the Astros endured the most losses in baseball, exiting the season with a 55–107 (.340) showing. This season also produced a new club record for losses, exceeding that established the season prior (106). The Houston Astros concluded the campaign in sixth and last place in the NL Central division, 42 games behind the division-champion Cincinnati Reds.

The Astros concluded their National League tenure with an all-time record of 3,999 victories and ,4,134 defeats for a .492 winning percentage. Through two prior waves of division realignment in 1969 and 1994, the move to the American League for 2013 signaled the end of 51 continuous seasons situated as direct competitors with the Reds—who, along with the Astros—were the only teams who first were situated from the at-large National League bracket starting from the Colt .45s expansion season in 1962, to form the National League West division in 1969, and then move to the NL Central in 1994.

Carlos Lee departed the Astros ranking second-most in club history with four walk-off home runs, second to José Cruz (6). (Note: HOU: 110 home runs in 1912-2025 – walk-off)

=== League standings ===
==== National League Central ====
NL Central
Team	W	L	Pct.	GB	Home	Road
Cincinnati Reds	97	65	.599	—	50‍–‍31	47‍–‍34
St. Louis Cardinals	88	74	.543	9	50‍–‍31	38‍–‍43
Milwaukee Brewers	83	79	.512	14	49‍–‍32	34‍–‍47
Pittsburgh Pirates	79	83	.488	18	45‍–‍36	34‍–‍47
Chicago Cubs	61	101	.377	36	38‍–‍43	23‍–‍58
Houston Astros	55	107	.340	42	35‍–‍46	20‍–‍61

==== National League Wild Card ====
NL Wild Card standings

Division leaders
Team	W	L	Pct.
Washington Nationals	98	64	.605
Cincinnati Reds	97	65	.599
San Francisco Giants	94	68	.580

Wild Card teams (Top 2 teams qualify for postseason)
Team	W	L	Pct.	GB
Atlanta Braves	94	68	.580	+6
St. Louis Cardinals	88	74	.543	—
Los Angeles Dodgers	86	76	.531	2
Milwaukee Brewers	83	79	.512	5
Philadelphia Phillies	81	81	.500	7
Arizona Diamondbacks	81	81	.500	7
Pittsburgh Pirates	79	83	.488	9
San Diego Padres	76	86	.469	12
New York Mets	74	88	.457	14
Miami Marlins	69	93	.426	19
Colorado Rockies	64	98	.395	24
Chicago Cubs	61	101	.377	27
Houston Astros	55	107	.340	33

==== Records versus opponents ====
National League

2012 National League record Source: MLB Standings Grid – 2012
Team	AZ	ATL	CHC	CIN	COL	MIA	HOU	LAD	MIL	NYM	PHI	PIT	SD	SF	STL	WSH	AL
Arizona	–	2–5	5–4	2–5	9–7	5–3	6–0	12–6	3–3	3–4	2–4	3–4	7–11	9–9	1–5	2–4	9–6
Atlanta	5–2	–	3–4	1–5	6–1	14–4	4–2	3–3	3–3	12–6	12–6	3–4	4–3	3–4	5–1	8–10	8–10
Chicago	4–5	4–3	–	4–12	2–4	8–5	2–4	2–4	4–13	4–2	2–4	8–8	3–3	1–6	7–10	1–6	5–10
Cincinnati	5–2	5–1	12–4	–	5–1	10–5	2–4	3–3	9–6	6–2	3–4	11–7	6–2	4–3	6–7	2–5	7–8
Colorado	7–9	1–6	4–2	1–5	–	5–2	5–2	8–10	5–1	5–2	2–7	2–4	8–10	4–14	2–5	4–3	2–13
Houston	0–6	2–4	5–8	5–10	2–5	–	2–4	2–4	8–9	4–2	3–3	5–12	3–5	1–8	4–11	1–7	6–9
Los Angeles	6–12	3–3	4–2	4–2	10–8	4–2	–	4–2	1–6	4–3	5–2	6–1	11–7	8–10	6–5	4–2	6–9
Miami	3–5	4–14	4–2	3–3	4–3	–	4–2	2–4	4–4	4–12	8–10	1–4	5–1	5–2	2–5	9–9	5–13
Milwaukee	3–3	3–3	13–4	6–9	1–5	9–8	6–1	4–4	–	3–2	2–5	11–4	3–4	2–4	6–9	3–5	6–9
New York	4–3	6–12	2–4	2–6	2–5	2–4	3–4	12–4	2–3	–	10–8	5–2	4–3	4–4	4–3	4–14	8–7
Philadelphia	4–2	6–12	4–2	4–3	7–2	10–8	3–3	2–5	5–2	8–10	–	3–4	4–3	2–4	5–2	9–9	5–10
Pittsburgh	4–3	2–3	8–8	7–11	4–2	4–1	12–5	1–6	4–11	2–5	4–3	–	1–5	3–3	8–7	3–2	10–8
San Diego	11–7	3–4	3–3	2–6	10–8	5–3	7–11	1–5	4–3	3–4	3–4	5–1	–	6–12	3–3	2–3	8–7
San Francisco	9–9	4–3	6–1	3–4	14–4	2–5	8–1	10–8	4–2	4–4	4–2	3–3	12–6	–	3–3	1–5	7–8
St. Louis	5–1	1–5	10–7	7–6	5–2	11–4	5–6	5–2	9–6	3–4	3–4	7–8	3–3	3–3	–	3–4	8–7
Washington	4–2	10–8	6–1	5–2	3–4	7–1	2–4	9–9	5–3	14–4	9–9	2–3	3–2	5–1	4–3	–	10–8

=== Roster ===
2012 Houston Astros
**Roster**
**Pitchers**: 58 Fernando Abad; 62 Héctor Ambriz; 28 David Carpenter; 63 Xavier Cedeño; 37 Francisco Cordero; 55 Rhiner Cruz; 66 Enerio Del Rosario; 28 Chuckie Fick; 30 Armando Galarraga; 31 Édgar González; 30 J. A. Happ; 64 Lucas Harrell; 60 Dallas Keuchel; 59 Wilton López; 41 Jordan Lyles; 37 Brandon Lyon; 39 Brett Myers; 20 Bud Norris; 62 Aneury Rodríguez; 43 Fernando Rodriguez; 51 Wandy Rodríguez; 65 Mickey Storey; 67 José Valdez; 56 Kyle Weiland; 53 Wesley Wright	**Catchers**: 15 Jason Castro; 22 Carlos Corporán; 18 Chris Snyder; **Infielders**: 27 Jose Altuve; 30,11 Matt Dominguez; 16 Matt Downs; 9 Marwin González; 23 Tyler Greene; 23 Chris Johnson; 13 Brandon Laird; 45 Carlos Lee; 4 Jed Lowrie; 46 Scott Moore; 38 Jimmy Paredes; 29 Brett Wallace	**Outfielders**: 39 Brandon Barnes; 12 Brian Bixler; 19 Brian Bogusevic; 6 Travis Buck; 3 Ben Francisco; 21 Fernando Martínez; 14 J. D. Martinez; 22,44 Justin Maxwell; 38 Jimmy Paredes; 13 Steve Pearce; 1 Jordan Schafer	**Manager**: 11 Tony DeFrancesco; 2 Brad Mills; **Coaches**: 50 Craig Bjornson (bullpen); 31 Mike Barnett (hitting); 85 Javier Bracamonte (bullpen catcher); 26 Doug Brocail (pitching) interim; 35 Dave Clark (third base); 10 Bobby Meacham (first base); 48 Joe Pettini (bench); 8 Stretch Suba (bullpen assistant); 45 Ty Van Burkleo (hitting coach)

=== Game log ===
Legend
	Astros win
	Astros loss
	Postponement
**Bold**	Astros team member

2012 Game Log
April (9–14)

#	Date	Opponent	Score	Win	Loss	Save	Attendance	Stadium	Record	Boxscore / Streak
1	April 6	Rockies	3–5	Guthrie (1–0)	**Rodriguez** (0–1)	Betancourt (1)	43,464	Minute Maid Park	0–1	L1
2	April 7	Rockies	7–3	**Harrell** (1–0)	Moyer (0–1)		23,962	Minute Maid Park	1–1	W1
3	April 8	Rockies	3–2	**López** (1–0)	Brothers (0–1)	**Myers** (1)	14,195	Minute Maid Park	2–1	W2
4	April 9	Braves	8–3	**Happ** (1–0)	Beachy (0–1)		17,095	Minute Maid Park	3–1	W3
5	April 10	Braves	4–6	Hanson (1–1)	**Weiland** (0–1)	Kimbrel (1)	22,036	Minute Maid Park	3–2	L1
6	April 11	Braves	3–6	Delgado (1–0)	**Rodríguez** (0–1)	Kimbrel (2)	18,225	Minute Maid Park	3–3	L2
7	April 13	@ Marlins	4–5 (11)	Webb (1–0)	**Lyon** (0–1)		30,169	Marlins Park	3–4	L3
8	April 14	@ Marlins	5–4	**Cruz** (1–0)	Bell (0–2)	**Myers (2)**	31,659	Marlins Park	4–4	W1
9	April 15	@ Marlins	4–5 (11)	Gaudin (1–0)	**Carpenter** (0–1)		34,232	Marlins Park	4–5	L1
10	April 16	@ Nationals	3–6	Strasburg (2–0)	**Weiland** (0–2)	Rodríguez (2)	16,245	Nationals Park	4–6	L2
11	April 17	@ Nationals	0–1	Gonzalez (1–0)	**Rodríguez** (0–2)	Lidge (2)	17,886	Nationals Park	4–7	L3
12	April 18	@ Nationals	2–3	Mattheus (2–0)	**F. Rodriguez** (0–2)	Rodríguez (3)	14,520	Nationals Park	4–8	L4
13	April 19	@ Nationals	11–4	**Norris** (1–0)	Jackson (1–1)		18,045	Nationals Park	5–8	W1
14	April 20	Dodgers	1–3	Lilly (2–0)	**Happ** (1–1)	Guerra (7)	30,270	Minute Maid Park	5–9	L1
15	April 21	Dodgers	1–5	Kershaw (1–0)	**Weiland** (0–3)		25,562	Minute Maid Park	5–10	L2
16	April 22	Dodgers	12–0	**Rodríguez** (1–2)	Billingsley (2–1)		23,948	Minute Maid Park	6–10	W1
17	April 23	@ Brewers	5–6	Greinke (2–1)	**Harrell** (1–1)	Axford (3)	36,291	Miller Park	6–11	L1
18	April 24	@ Brewers	6–9	Wolf (1–2)	**Norris** (1–1)	Axford (4)	38,686	Miller Park	6–12	L2
19	April 25	@ Brewers	7–5	**López** (2–0)	Veras (2–1)	**Myers** (3)	26,778	Miller Park	7–12	W1
20	April 27	@ Reds	6–4	**Rodríguez** (2–2)	Leake (0–3)	**Myers** (4)	29,486	Great American Ball Park	8–12	W2
21	April 28	@ Reds	0–6	Cueto (3–0)	**Harrell** (1–2)		32,971	Great American Ball Park	8–13	L1
22	April 29	@ Reds	5–6	Ondrusek (1–0)	**F. Rodriguez** (0–3)	Marshall (5)	31,086	Great American Ball Park	8–14	L2
23	April 30	Mets	4–3	**F. Rodriguez** (1–3)	Acosta (0–2)	**Myers** (5)	17,536	Minute Maid Park	9–14	W1

May (13–15)

#	Date	Opponent	Score	Win	Loss	Save	Attendance	Stadium	Record	Boxscore / Streak
24	May 1	Mets	6–3	**Happ** (2–1)	Niese (2–1)	**Myers** (6)	17,958	Minute Maid Park	10–14	W2
25	May 2	Mets	8–1	**Rodríguez** (3–2)	Schwinden (0–1)		19,442	Minute Maid Park	11–14	W3
26	May 4	Cardinals	5–4	**Harrell** (2–2)	Lohse (4–1)	**Myers** (7)	27,201	Minute Maid Park	12–14	W4
27	May 5	Cardinals	8–2	**Norris** (2–1)	García (2–2)		23,633	Minute Maid Park	13–14	W5
28	May 6	Cardinals	1–8	Wainwright (2–3)	**Happ** (2–2)		22,288	Minute Maid Park	13–15	L1
29	May 7	Marlins	0–4	Zambrano (1–2)	**Rodríguez** (3–3)		16,531	Minute Maid Park	13–16	L2
30	May 8	Marlins	3–2	**López** (3–0)	Webb (1–1)	**Myers** (8)	14,801	Minute Maid Park	14–16	W1
31	May 9	Marlins	3–5 (12)	Webb (2–1)	**Carpenter** (0–2)		16,072	Minute Maid Park	14–17	L1
32	May 11	@ Pirates	1–0	**Norris** (3–1)	McDonald (2–2)	**Myers** (9)	19,878	PNC Park	15–17	W1
33	May 12	@ Pirates	2–5	Morton (2–3)	**Happ** (2–3)	Cruz (3)	34,187	PNC Park	15–18	L1
34	May 13	@ Pirates	2–3 (12)	Watson (3–0)	**F. Rodriguez** (1–4)		27,517	PNC Park	15–19	L2
35	May 14	@ Phillies	1–5	Blanton (4–3)	**Harrell** (2–3)		43,824	Citizens Bank Park	15–20	L3
36	May 15	@ Phillies	3–4 (10)	Diekman (1–0)	**Myers** (0–1)		43,781	Citizens Bank Park	15–21	L4
37	May 16	Brewers	8–3	**Norris** (4–1)	Wolf (2–4)		15,453	Minute Maid Park	16–21	W1
38	May 17	Brewers	4–0	**Happ** (3–3)	Marcum (2–2)		15,173	Minute Maid Park	17–21	W2
39	May 18	Rangers	1–4	Ross (5–0)	**Rodríguez** (3–4)	Nathan (9)	34,715	Minute Maid Park	17–22	L1
40	May 19	Rangers	6–5	**Harrell** (3–3)	Holland (3–3)	**Myers** (10)	42,673	Minute Maid Park	18–22	W1
41	May 20	Rangers	1–6	Lewis (4–3)	**Lyles** (0–1)		35,873	Minute Maid Park	18–23	L1
42	May 21	Cubs	8–4	**Norris** (5–1)	Garza (2–2)		16,895	Minute Maid Park	19–23	W1
43	May 22	Cubs	2–1	**Happ** (4–3)	Wood (0–1)	**Myers** (11)	20,091	Minute Maid Park	20–23	W2
44	May 23	Cubs	5–1	**Rodríguez** (4–4)	Samardzija (4–3)		18,732	Minute Maid Park	21–23	W3
45	May 25	@ Dodgers	3–1	**Harrell** (4–3)	Kershaw (4–2)	**Myers** (12)	36,283	Dodger Stadium	22–23	W4
46	May 26	@ Dodgers	3–6	Jansen (4–0)	**Wright** (0–1)		36,561	Dodger Stadium	22–24	L1
47	May 27	@ Dodgers	1–5	Capuano (7–1)	**Happ** (4–4)		33,306	Dodger Stadium	22–25	L2
48	May 28	@ Rockies	7–9	Belisle (2–2)	**F. Rodriguez** (1–5)	Betancourt (9)	34,546	Coors Field	22–26	L3
49	May 28	@ Rockies	6–7 (10)	Roenicke (1–0)	**Myers** (0–2)		35,786	Coors Field	22–27	L4
50	May 30	@ Rockies	5–13	Friedrich (3–1)	**Harrell** (4–4)		28,102	Coors Field	22–28	L5
51	May 31	@ Rockies	5–11	Guthrie (3–3)	**Norris** (5–2)		31,799	Coors Field	22–29	L6

June (10–17)

#	Date	Opponent	Score	Win	Loss	Save	Attendance	Stadium	Record	Boxscore / Streak
52	June 1	Reds	1–4	Leake (2–5)	**Happ** (4–5)	Chapman (4)	21,464	Minute Maid Park	22–30	L7
53	June 2	Reds	9–12	LeCure (1–1)	**F. Rodriguez** (1–6)	Chapman (5)	22,991	Minute Maid Park	22–31	L8
54	June 3	Reds	5–3	**Lyles** (1–1)	Arroyo (2–4)	**Myers** (13)	19,914	Minute Maid Park	23–31	W1
55	June 5	Cardinals	9–8	**Harrell** (5–4)	García (3–4)	**Myers** (14)	18,911	Minute Maid Park	24–31	W2
56	June 6	Cardinals	3–4	Wainwright (5–6)	**Norris** (5–3)	Motte (10)	18,517	Minute Maid Park	24–32	L1
57	June 7	Cardinals	2–14	Lynn (9–2)	**Happ** (4–6)		22,265	Minute Maid Park	24–33	L2
58	June 8	@ White Sox	8–3	**Rodríguez** (5–4)	Floyd (4–6)		22,452	U.S. Cellular Field	25–33	W1
59	June 9	@ White Sox	1–10	Sale (8–2)	**Lyles** (1–2)		22,880	U.S. Cellular Field	25–34	L1
60	June 10	@ White Sox	11–9	**Harrell** (6–4)	Humber (2–4)	**Myers** (15)	20,398	U.S. Cellular Field	26–34	W1
61	June 12	@ Giants	3–6	Bumgarner (8–4)	**Norris** (5–4)	Casilla (17)	42,100	AT&T Park	26–35	L1
62	June 13	@ Giants	0–10	Cain (8–2)	**Happ** (4–7)		42,298	AT&T Park	26–36	L2
63	June 14	@ Giants	6–3	**Rodríguez** (6–4)	Zito (5–4)	**Myers** (16)	41,662	AT&T Park	27–36	W1
64	June 15	@ Rangers	2–6	Darvish (8–4)	**Lyles** (1–3)		47,430	Rangers Ballpark in Arlington	27–37	L1
65	June 16	@ Rangers	3–8	Grimm (1–0)	**Harrell** (6–5)		48,288	Rangers Ballpark in Arlington	27–38	L2
66	June 17	@ Rangers	3–9	Lewis (6–5)	**F. Rodriguez** (1–7)		46,320	Rangers Ballpark in Arlington	27–39	L3
67	June 18	Royals	9–7	**Happ** (5–7)	Sánchez (1–3)	**Cedeño** (1)	15,436	Minute Maid Park	28–39	W1
68	June 19	Royals	0–2	Hochevar (4–7)	**Rodríguez** (6–5)	Broxton (17)	18,098	Minute Maid Park	28–40	L1
69	June 20	Royals	1–2	Chen (6–6)	**Lyles** (1–4)	Broxton (18)	30,687	Minute Maid Park	28–41	L2
70	June 22	Indians	0–2	Jiménez (7–5)	**Harrell** (6–6)	Perez (23)	26,932	Minute Maid Park	28–42	L3
71	June 23	Indians	8–1	**Keuchel** (1–0)	Gómez (4–7)		34,241	Minute Maid Park	29–42	W1
72	June 24	Indians	7–1	**Happ** (6–7)	Lowe (7–6)		21,191	Minute Maid Park	30–42	W2
73	June 25	Padres	7–8 (10)	Thayer (1–2)	**Lyon** (0–2)	Street (11)	14,483	Minute Maid Park	30–43	L1
74	June 26	Padres	5–3	**Lyles** (2–4)	Wells (0–1)	**Myers** (17)	15,416	Minute Maid Park	31–43	W1
75	June 27	Padres	1–0	**Harrell** (7–6)	Richard (5–8)		15,012	Minute Maid Park	32–43	W2
76	June 28	Padres	3–7	Vincent (1–0)	**Myers** (0–3)		19,415	Minute Maid Park	32–44	L1
77	June 29	@ Cubs	0–4	Maholm (5–6)	**Norris** (5–5)	Mármol (6)	32,891	Wrigley Field	32–45	L2
78	June 30	@ Cubs	2–3	Garza (4–6)	**Happ** (6–8)	Mármol (7)	37,906	Wrigley Field	32–46	L3

July (3–24)

#	Date	Opponent	Score	Win	Loss	Save	Attendance	Stadium	Record	Boxscore / Streak
79	July 1	@ Cubs	0–3	Wood (3–3)	**Rodríguez** (6–6)	Mármol (8)	37,389	Wrigley Field	32–47	L4
80	July 2	@ Pirates	2–11	McDonald (8–3)	**Lyles** (2–5)		21,041	PNC Park	32–48	L5
81	July 3	@ Pirates	7–8	Hanrahan (4–0)	**Wright** (0–2)		21,516	PNC Park	32–49	L6
82	July 4	@ Pirates	4–6	Correia (5–6)	**Keuchel** (1–1)	Hanrahan (21)	36,827	PNC Park	32–50	L7
83	July 5	@ Pirates	0–2	Karstens (2–2)	**Norris** (5–6)	Hanrahan (22)	21,386	PNC Park	32–51	L8
84	July 6	Brewers	1–7	Gallardo (7–6)	**Happ** (6–9)		23,430	Minute Maid Park	32–52	L9
85	July 7	Brewers	6–3	**Rodríguez** (7–6)	Greinke (9–3)	**Myers** (18)	23,027	Minute Maid Park	33–52	W1
86	July 8	Brewers	3–5 (10)	Parra (1–3)	**F. Rodriguez** (1–8)	Axford (15)	16,966	Minute Maid Park	33–53	L1
87	July 13	@ Giants	1–5	Bumgarner (11–5)	**Rodríguez** (7–7)	Casilla (22)	42,116	AT&T Park	33–54	L2
88	July 14	@ Giants	2–3 (12)	Affeldt (1–1)	**Myers** (0–4)		42,171	AT&T Park	33–55	L3
89	July 15	@ Giants	2–3	Cain (10–3)	**Norris** (5–7)	Casilla (23)	42,265	AT&T Park	33–56	L4
90	July 16	@ Padres	2–0	**Happ** (7–9)	Wells (1–3)	**Myers** (19)	26,098	Petco Park	34–56	W1
91	July 17	@ Padres	2–8	Ohlendorf (3–0)	**Lyles** (2–6)		20,944	Petco Park	34–57	L1
92	July 18	@ Padres	4–8	Richard (7–10)	**Rodríguez** (7–8)	Street (15)	25,713	Petco Park	34–58	L2
93	July 19	@ Padres	0–1	Vólquez (6–7)	**Harrell** (7–7)		26,735	Petco Park	34–59	L3
94	July 20	@ Diamondbacks	8–13	Cahill (8–8)	**Norris** (5–8)		23,567	Chase Field	34–60	L4
95	July 21	@ Diamondbacks	3–12	Miley (11–5)	**Keuchel** (1–2)		35,665	Chase Field	34–61	L5
96	July 22	@ Diamondbacks	2–8	Collmenter (2–2)	**Lyles** (2–7)		20,951	Chase Field	34–62	L6
97	July 23	Reds	3–8	Latos (8–3)	**Rodríguez** (7–9)		15,538	Minute Maid Park	34–63	L7
98	July 24	Reds	2–4	Leake (4–6)	**Cordero** (3–6)	Chapman (18)	15,908	Minute Maid Park	34–64	L8
99	July 25	Reds	3–5	Marshall (3–3)	**Cordero** (3–7)	Chapman (19)	16,077	Minute Maid Park	34–65	L9
100	July 26	Pirates	3–5	Burnett (12–3)	**Keuchel** (1–3)	Hanrahan (30)	19,926	Minute Maid Park	34–66	L10
101	July 27	Pirates	5–6	Watson (5–1)	**Cruz** (1–1)	Hanrahan (31)	24,685	Minute Maid Park	34–67	L11
102	July 28	Pirates	3–4	Resop (1–3)	**Fick** (0–1)	Grilli (2)	34,146	Minute Maid Park	34–68	L12
103	July 29	Pirates	9–5	**Harrell** (8–7)	McDonald (10–5)		20,453	Minute Maid Park	35–68	W1
104	July 30	@ Brewers	7–8	Hernández (3–1)	**Cordero** (3–8)	Axford (17)	28,131	Miller Park	35–69	L1
105	July 31	@ Brewers	1–10	Gallardo (9–8)	**Keuchel** (1–4)		30,011	Miller Park	35–70	L2

August (5–22)

#	Date	Opponent	Score	Win	Loss	Save	Attendance	Stadium	Record	Boxscore / Streak
106	August 1	@ Brewers	4–13	Fiers (5–4)	**Lyles** (2–8)		32,217	Miller Park	35–71	L3
107	August 3	@ Braves	1–4	Hudson (11–4)	**Galarraga** (0–1)	Kimbrel (31)	28,300	Turner Field	35–72	L4
108	August 4	@ Braves	3–2	**Harrell** (9–7)	Maholm (9–7)	**López** (1)	30,029	Turner Field	36–72	W1
109	August 5	@ Braves	1–6	Venters (4–3)	**Norris** (5–9)		23,474	Turner Field	36–73	L1
110	August 6	Nationals	4–5 (11)	Stammen (5–1)	**López** (3–1)		13,843	Minute Maid Park	36–74	L2
111	August 7	Nationals	2–3 (12)	Storen (1–0)	**Storey** (0–1)	Clippard (23)	14,273	Minute Maid Park	36–75	L3
112	August 8	Nationals	3–4	Gonzalez (14–6)	**Galarraga** (0–2)		16,038	Minute Maid Park	36–76	L4
113	August 9	Nationals	0–5	Zimmermann (9–6)	**Harrell** (9–8)		14,417	Minute Maid Park	36–77	L5
114	August 10	Brewers	4–3	**López** (4–1)	Axford (4–7)		21,025	Minute Maid Park	37–77	W1
115	August 11	Brewers	6–5 (10)	**López** (5–1)	Henderson (0–1)		17,942	Minute Maid Park	38–77	W2
116	August 12	Brewers	3–5	Gallardo (11–8)	**Lyles** (2–9)	Loe (1)	19,235	Minute Maid Park	38–78	L1
117	August 13	@ Cubs	1–7	Samardzija (8–10)	**Galarraga** (0–3)		31,452	Wrigley Field	38–79	L2
118	August 14	@ Cubs	10–1	**Harrell** (10–8)	Volstad (0–9)		33,376	Wrigley Field	39–79	W1
119	August 15	@ Cubs	2–7	Germano (2–2)	**Norris** (5–10)		33,714	Wrigley Field	39–80	L1
120	August 17	Diamondbacks	1–3	Miley (13–8)	**Keuchel** (1–5)	Putz (24)	19,223	Minute Maid Park	39–81	L2
121	August 18	Diamondbacks	4–12	Corbin (5–4)	**Lyles** (2–10)		20,838	Minute Maid Park	39–82	L3
122	August 19	Diamondbacks	1–8	Kennedy (11–10)	**Galarraga** (0–4)		14,923	Minute Maid Park	39–83	L4
123	August 21	@ Cardinals	0–7	Wainwright (12–10)	**Harrell** (10–9)		35,370	Busch Stadium	39–84	L5
124	August 22	@ Cardinals	2–4	Lohse (13–2)	**Norris** (5–11)	Motte (29)	35,198	Busch Stadium	39–85	L6
125	August 23	@ Cardinals	5–13	Westbrook (13–9)	**Keuchel** (1–6)		30,343	Busch Stadium	39–86	L7
126	August 24	@ Mets	3–1	**Lyles** (3–10)	Niese (10–7)	**López** (2)	25,513	Citi Field	40–86	W1
127	August 25	@ Mets	1–3	Dickey (16–4)	**Abad** (0–1)	Francisco (21)	29,906	Citi Field	40–87	L1
128	August 26	@ Mets	1–2	Parnell (3–3)	**López** (5–2)		25,071	Citi Field	40–88	L2
129	August 28	Giants	2–3	Casilla (5–5)	**López** (5–3)	Romo (7)	13,516	Minute Maid Park	40–89	L3
130	August 29	Giants	4–6	Kontos (1–0)	**Keuchel** (1–7)	López (5)	13,207	Minute Maid Park	40–90	L4
131	August 30	Giants	4–8	Vogelsong (12–7)	**F. Rodriguez** (1–9)	Romo (8)	12,835	Minute Maid Park	40–91	L5
132	August 31	Reds	3–9	Leake (7–8)	**Abad** (0–2)		15,287	Minute Maid Park	40–92	L6

September (13–14)

#	Date	Opponent	Score	Win	Loss	Save	Attendance	Stadium	Record	Boxscore / Streak
133	September 1	Reds	2–1	**López** (6–3)	Marshall (4–5)		18,316	Minute Maid Park	41–92	W1
134	September 2	Reds	3–5	Arredondo (6–2)	**Cedeño** (0–1)	Chapman (34)	17,291	Minute Maid Park	41–93	L1
135	September 3	@ Pirates	5–1	**González** (1–0)	Locke (0–1)		20,055	PNC Park	42–93	W1
136	September 4	@ Pirates	2–6	Rodríguez (10–13)	**Lyles** (3–11)		12,785	PNC Park	42–94	L1
137	September 5	@ Pirates	3–6	Correia (10–8)	**Abad** (0–3)		14,159	PNC Park	42–95	L2
138	September 7	@ Reds	5–3	**Ambriz** (1–0)	Chapman (5–5)	**López** (3)	23,785	Great American Ball Park	43–95	W1
139	September 8	@ Reds	1–5	Arroyo (12–7)	**Norris** (5–12)		35,018	Great American Ball Park	43–96	L1
140	September 9	@ Reds	5–1	**González** (2–0)	Cueto (17–8)		33,438	Great American Ball Park	44–96	W1
141	September 10	Cubs	1–4	Volstad (3–10)	**F. Rodriguez** (1–10)	Mármol (19)	13,121	Minute Maid Park	44–97	L1
142	September 11	Cubs	1–0	**Lyles** (4–11)	Germano (2–7)	**López** (4)	14,205	Minute Maid Park	45–97	W1
143	September 12	Cubs	1–5	Wood (6–11)	**Abad** (0–4)		13,101	Minute Maid Park	45–98	L1
144	September 13	Phillies	6–4	**Wright** (1–2)	Aumont (0–1)	**López** (5)	13,028	Minute Maid Park	46–98	W1
145	September 14	Phillies	6–12	Hamels (15–6)	**González** (2–1)		17,535	Minute Maid Park	46–99	L1
146	September 15	Phillies	5–0	**Keuchel** (2–7)	Kendrick (9–11)		20,419	Minute Maid Park	47–99	W1
147	September 16	Phillies	7–6	**Wright** (2–2)	Bastardo (2–5)	**López** (6)	17,438	Minute Maid Park	48–99	W2
148	September 18	@ Cardinals	1–4	Lohse (15–3)	**Abad** (0–5)	Motte (36)	35,422	Busch Stadium	48–100	L1
149	September 19	@ Cardinals	0–5	Lynn (16–7)	**Harrell** (10–10)	Motte (37)	39,062	Busch Stadium	48–101	L2
150	September 20	@ Cardinals	4–5	García (5–7)	**Norris** (5–13)	Motte (38)	34,788	Busch Stadium	48–102	L3
151	September 21	Pirates	7–1	**F. Rodriguez** (2–10)	Locke (0–2)		17,093	Minute Maid Park	49–102	W1
152	September 22	Pirates	4–1	**Keuchel** (3–7)	Correia (11–10)	**López** (7)	17,185	Minute Maid Park	50–102	W2
153	September 23	Pirates	1–8	Burnett (16–8)	**Lyles** (4–12)		15,207	Minute Maid Park	50–103	L1
154	September 24	Cardinals	1–6	Lynn (17–7)	**Abad** (0–6)		12,584	Minute Maid Park	50–104	L2
155	September 25	Cardinals	0–4	García (6–7)	**Harrell** (10–11)		16,943	Minute Maid Park	50–105	L3
156	September 26	Cardinals	2–0	**Norris** (6–13)	Carpenter (0–1)	**López** (8)	18,712	Minute Maid Park	51–105	W1
157	September 28	@ Brewers	7–6	**González** (3–1)	Gallardo (16–9)	**López** (9)	41,716	Miller Park	52–105	W2
158	September 29	@ Brewers	5–9	Estrada (5–7)	**Keuchel** (3–8)		34,294	Miller Park	52–106	L1
159	September 30	@ Brewers	7–0	**Lyles** (5–12)	Fiers (9–10)		38,443	Miller Park	53–106	W1

October (2–1)

#	Date	Opponent	Score	Win	Loss	Save	Attendance	Stadium	Record	Boxscore / Streak
160	October 1	@ Cubs	3-0	**Harrell** (11–11)	Berken (0–3)	**Wright** (1)	32,167	Wrigley Field	54-106	W2
161	October 2	@ Cubs	3-0	**Norris** (7–13)	Volstad (3–12)	**López** (10)	33,168	Wrigley Field	55-106	W3
162	October 3	@ Cubs	4–5	Mármol (3–3)	**Ambriz** (1–1)		27,606	Wrigley Field	55–107	L1

== Player statistics ==
Table legend
League top ten	*	Left-handed batter or pitcher	Leader in appearances at position
Team leader	#	Switch hitter	

=== Batting ===
Abbreviations key

- ⌖ — primary position
- G — games played
- PA — plate appearances
- AB — at bats
- R — runs
- H — hits
- 2B — doubles
- HR — home runs
- RBI — runs batted in
- BB — base on balls
- SB — stolen bases
- TB — total bases
- AVG — batting average
- OBP — on-base percentage
- SLG — slugging percentage
- OPS — on-base plus slugging

Individual batting results
Player	G	AB	R	H	2B	3B	HR	RBI	BB	SO	AVG	SB
Jose Altuve	147	576	80	167	34	4	7	37	40	74	.290	33
Carlos Lee	66	258	24	74	15	1	5	29	19	17	.287	0
Matt Dominguez	31	109	14	31	2	2	5	16	4	17	.284	0
Chris Johnson	92	341	36	95	21	3	8	41	23	92	.279	4
Carlos Corporán^{#}	27	78	5	21	2	0	4	13	4	19	.269	0
Scott Moore*	72	201	23	52	11	0	9	26	16	56	.259	0
Brandon Laird	17	35	2	9	1	0	1	4	2	8	.257	0
Jason Castro*	87	257	29	66	15	2	6	29	31	61	.257	0
Steve Pearce	21	63	2	16	4	1	0	8	7	16	.254	1
Brett Wallace*	66	229	24	58	10	1	9	24	18	73	.253	0
Ben Francisco	31	85	5	21	4	0	2	5	5	23	.247	0
Tyler Greene	39	126	18	31	6	0	7	11	6	39	.246	3
Jed Lowrie^{#}	97	340	43	83	18	0	16	42	43	65	.244	2
J. D. Martinez	113	395	34	95	14	3	11	55	40	96	.241	0
Fernando Martínez*	41	118	12	28	7	1	6	14	6	34	.237	0
Marwin González^{#}	80	205	21	48	13	0	2	12	13	29	.234	3
Justin Maxwell	124	315	46	72	13	3	18	53	32	114	.229	9
Travis Buck*	33	74	7	16	5	1	0	6	6	18	.216	0
Jordan Schafer*	106	313	40	66	10	2	4	23	36	106	.211	27
Brandon Barnes	43	98	8	20	3	0	1	7	5	29	.204	1
Brian Bogusevic*	146	355	39	72	9	2	7	28	41	96	.203	15
Matt Downs	91	178	15	36	4	1	8	16	8	38	.202	2
Brian Bixler	36	88	11	17	6	0	2	7	7	36	.193	7
Jimmy Paredes^{#}	24	74	4	14	1	1	0	3	6	21	.189	2
Chris Snyder	76	221	23	39	8	0	7	24	33	70	.176	0
Pitcher totals	162	275	15	29	2	0	1	12	12	118	.105	0
Team totals	162	5407	583	1276	238	28	146	545	463	1365	.236	105

=== Pitching ===
Abbreviations

- W — wins
- L — losses
- ERA — earned run average
- G — games pitched
- GS — games started
- SV — saves
- IP — innings pitched
- H — hits allowed
- ER — earned runs allowed
- BB — base on balls allowed
- SO — strikeouts
- WHIP — walks plus hits per inning pitched

Individual pitching results
Player	W	L	ERA	G	GS	SV	IP	H	R	ER	HR	BB	SO
Lucas Harrell	11	11	3.76	32	32	0	193. 2	185	90	81	13	78	140
Bud Norris	7	13	4.65	29	29	0	168.1	165	90	87	23	66	165
Jordan Lyles	5	12	5.09	25	25	0	141.1	159	97	80	20	42	99
Wandy Rodríguez*	7	9	3.79	21	21	0	130.2	134	66	55	13	32	89
J.A. Happ*	7	9	4.83	18	18	0	104.1	112	58	56	17	39	98
Dallas Keuchel*	3	8	5.27	16	16	0	85.1	93	56	50	14	39	38
Fernando Rodriguez	2	10	5.37	71	0	0	70.1	68	45	42	10	34	78
Wilton López	6	3	2.17	64	0	10	66.1	61	18	16	4	8	54
Rhiner Cruz	1	1	6.05	52	0	0	55.0	65	38	37	8	29	46
Wesley Wright	2	2	3.27	77	0	1	52.1	45	20	19	4	17	54
Fernando Abad*	0	6	5.09	37	6	0	46.0	57	27	26	6	19	38
Brandon Lyon	0	2	3.25	37	0	0	36.0	37	13	13	3	11	35
Xavier Cedeño*	0	1	3.77	44	0	1	31.0	30	15	13	3	14	36
Brett Myers	0	4	3.52	35	0	19	30.2	35	17	12	4	6	20
Mickey Storey	0	1	3.86	26	0	0	30.1	27	14	13	2	10	34
David Carpenter	0	2	6.07	30	0	0	29.2	43	21	20	4	14	27
Édgar González	3	1	5.04	6	6	0	25.0	23	14	14	3	8	18
Armando Galarraga	0	4	6.75	5	5	0	24.0	28	20	18	6	18	17
C.J. Fick	0	1	4.30	18	0	0	23.0	24	13	11	4	17	17
Héctor Ambriz	1	1	4.19	18	0	0	19.1	14	9	9	0	11	22
Enerio del Rosario	0	0	9.00	19	0	0	19.0	34	21	19	1	7	11
Kyle Weiland	0	3	6.62	3	3	0	17.2	24	13	13	5	7	13
José Valdez	0	0	2.25	12	0	0	12.0	12	4	3	1	8	10
Aneury Rodriguez	0	0	3.00	1	1	0	6.0	2	2	2	2	2	6
Francisco Cordero	0	3	19.80	6	0	0	5.0	13	11	11	2	4	5
Brian Bogusevic*	0	0	18.00	1	0	0	1.0	3	2	2	1	0	0
Team totals	55	107	4.56	162	162	31	1423.1	1493	794	721	173	540	1170

== Major League Baseball draft ==
Houston Astros 2012 MLB draft selections
Rd.	Slot	Draftee	Position	School	Origin	Signed	Notes	Bio
1	1	Carlos Correa	Shortstop	Puerto Rico Baseball Academy	(Puerto Rico)	Y	(Note: MLB debut on June 8, 2015)	
1	41	Lance McCullers Jr.	Right-handed pitcher	Jesuit High (FL)	(Florida)	Y	(Note: Compensation for the loss of Type B free agent Clint Barmes) (Note: MLB debut on May 18, 2015)	
2	61	Nolan Fontana	Shortstop	Florida • 2012	(Texas)	Y	(Note: MLB debut on May 22, 2017)	
3	96	Brady Rodgers	Right-handed pitcher	Arizona State	(Texas)	Y	(Note: MLB debut on September 3, 2016)	
4	129	Rio Ruiz	Third baseman	Bishop Amat Memorial (CA)	(California)	Y	(Note: MLB debut on September 18, 2016)	
5	159	Andrew Aplin	Center fielder	Arizona State	(California)	Y		
6	189	Brett Phillips	Center fielder	Seminole High (FL)	(Florida)	Y	(Note: MLB debut on June 5, 2017)	
7	219	Preston Tucker	Outfielder	Henry B. Plant High (FL)	(Florida)	Y	(Note: MLB debut on May 7, 2015)	
8	249	Tyler Heineman	Catcher	UCLA • 2012	(California)	Y	(Note: MLB debut on September 4, 2019)	
9	279	Dan Minor	Right-handed pitcher	Texas A&M	(Texas)	Y		
10	309	Joe Bircher	Left-handed pitcher	Bradley	(Nebraska)	Y		
14	429	Joe Sclafani	Shortstop	Dartmouth	(New York (state))	Y		
33	999	Mike Hauschild	Right-handed pitcher	Dayton	(Ohio)	Y	(Note: MLB debut on April 8, 2017)	
34	1029	Jordan Jankowski	Right-handed pitcher	Catawba	(Pennsylvania)	Y	(Note: MLB debut on May 24, 2017)	
38	1149	Zach Remillard	Third baseman	La Salle (NY)	(New York (state))	N	(Note: Signed with the Chicago White Sox from the 2016 draft.) (Note: MLB debut on June 17, 2023)	

== Awards and achievements ==
=== Grand slams ===
No.	Date	Astros batter	Venue	Inning	Pitcher	Opposing team	Box
1	April 22	Jordan Schafer (Note: 1st MLB grand slam)	Minute Maid Park	2	Chad Billingsley	Los Angeles Dodgers	
2	May 5	Chris Johnson	Minute Maid Park	1 (Note: Tied score or took lead)	Jaime García	St. Louis Cardinals	
3	June 14	J. D. Martinez	AT&T Park	3	Barry Zito	San Francisco Giants	

=== Awards ===
2012 Houston Astros award winners
Name of award		Recipient	Ref
Darryl Kile Good Guy Award		Jason Castro	
Houston Astros Player of the Year		Lucas Harrell	
MLB All-Star Game	Reserve infielder	Jose Altuve	
Wilson Defensive Player of the Year (Note: Selection criteria for the Wilson MLB Defensive awards have evolved throughout its lifespan. In 2012, the year the awards were instituted, and 2013, one award was presented to one outstanding defender on each team, regardless of position, as well as one to the outstanding defender for the each league, regardless of position or team.)	Team	Justin Maxwell	

Other awards results

Name of award	Voting recipient(s) (Team)	Ref.
Roberto Clemente	Winner—Kershaw (LAD) • Nominee—Wright (HOU)	

=== Milestones ===
==== Major League debuts ====
Player—Appeared at position

- Dallas Keuchel, starting pitcher
Date and opponent

- June 17 vs Texas
Box

Also:

== Minor league system ==
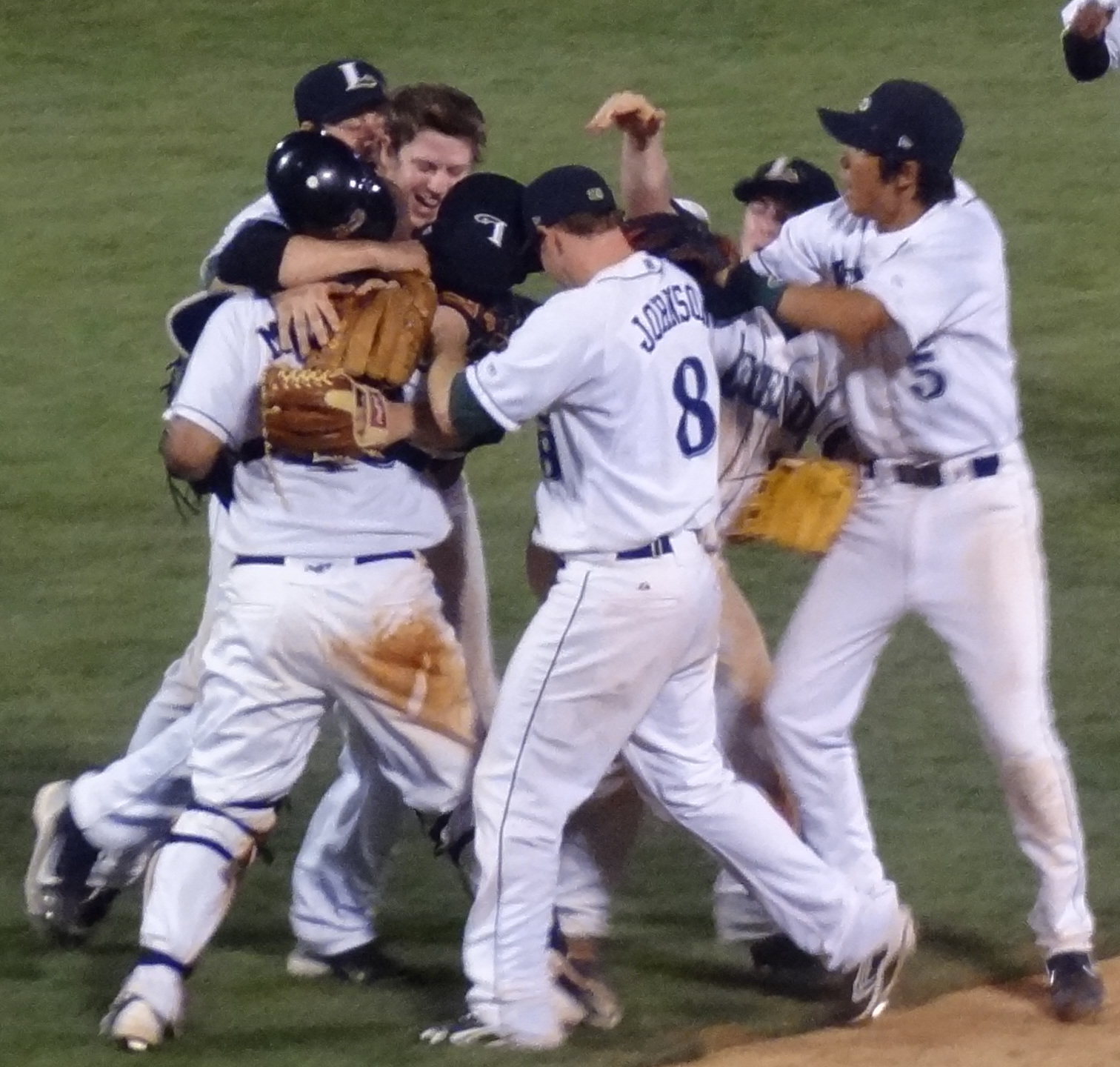
Chris Devenski and Lexington Legends teammates celebrate no-hitter after the final out.

Level	Team	League	Manager
AAA	Oklahoma City RedHawks	Pacific Coast League	Tony DeFrancesco and Tom Lawless
AA	Corpus Christi Hooks	Texas League	Keith Bodie
A	Lancaster JetHawks	California League	Rodney Linares
A	Lexington Legends	South Atlantic League	Iván DeJesús
A-Short Season	Tri-City ValleyCats	New York–Penn League	Stubby Clapp
Rookie	Greeneville Astros	Appalachian League	Omar López
Rookie	GCL Astros	Gulf Coast League	Ed Romero

=== Championships ===
- California League champions: Lancaster

=== Awards ===
- All-Star Futures Game: Jon Singleton, 1B
- California League All-Star Team—Outfielder: George Springer
- California League Most Valuable Player Award (MVP): A. J. Reed
- Houston Astros Minor League Player of the Year: Jon Singleton, 1B
- Texas League All-Star—Designated hitter: Jon Singleton

=== Summary ===
==== Chris Devenski's no-hitter ====
In his fifth start for Lexington on August 31, right-hander Chris Devenski tossed a no-hitter while striking out 16 to lead a 10–0 rout of the Rome Braves It was Devenski 13th start in his career in professional baseball. A fifth-inning base on balls to Kyle Kutbitza resulted in the only baserunner that Devenski allowed. This was the first complete game no-hitter in Lexington team history. In the first inning, third baseman Matt Duffy slugged a three-run home run to start the scoring for the Legends, on the way to a 3-for-5 bout. Duffy homered twice, collected five RBI, and ranged to make an acrobatic catch down the right field line for the defensive play of the contest. This was the second no-hitter in team history, following a combined effort on July 30, 2001, by Derek Stanford, Chris George and Kirk Saarloos.

Devenski later pitched in relief during a combined no-hitter at the major league level for Houston on August 3, 2019.

== See also ==
- List of first overall Major League Baseball draft picks
- List of Major League Baseball single-inning strikeout leaders
