= Tony DeFrancesco =

American baseball coach

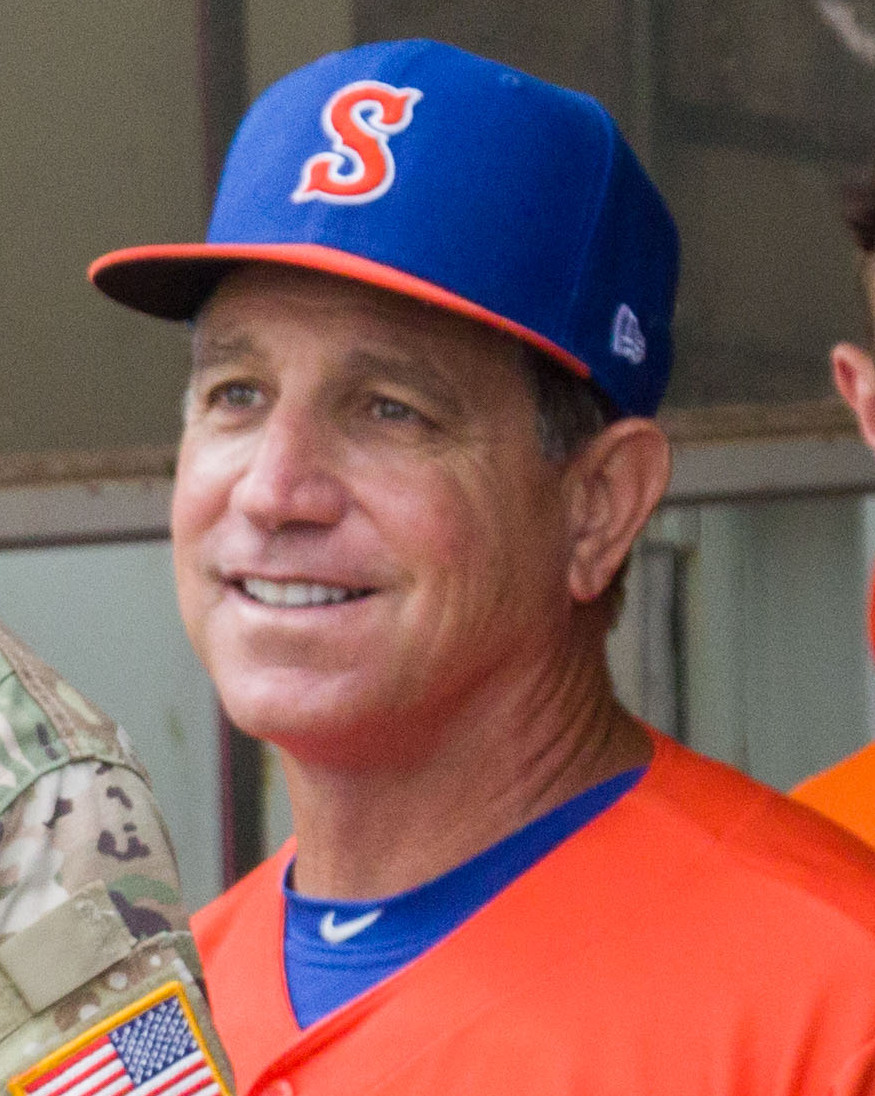
- DeFrancesco with the Syracuse Mets in 2019

Dorados de Chihuahua
- Manager / Coach
- Born: April 24, 1963 (age 63); Suffern, New York, U.S.
- Bats: Right Throws: Right

MLB statistics
- Games: 41
- Win–loss record: 16–25
- Winning %: .390
- Managerial record at Baseball Reference

Teams
- As manager: Houston Astros (2012); As coach: Oakland Athletics (2008); New York Mets (2020)

Anthony John DeFrancesco (born April 24, 1963) is an American professional baseball coach and current manager for the Dorados de Chihuahua of the Mexican League.

Previously, he was interim manager with the Houston Astros; served one season as third-base coach for the Oakland Athletics; spent six seasons as manager of the Sacramento River Cats; and was a minor league coach and manager for the Oakland Athletics farm system for fourteen years, managing teams in the Arizona Rookie League, Northwest League, California League, Texas League, and Pacific Coast League (PCL). As a player, he was a catcher in the Boston Red Sox and Cincinnati Reds farm systems from 1984 to 1992.

As the manager of the PCL's River Cats, (Oakland's Triple-A farm club), DeFrancesco led the team to three PCL titles in five years, winning the Pacific Coast League Manager of the Year Award and The Sporting News Minor League Manager of the Year award in 2003. The River Cats won the 2007 Bricktown Showdown under DeFrancesco.

In 2015, he managed the Fresno Grizzlies, the Triple-A PCL affiliate of the Houston Astros, to the Triple-A National Championship and was named Baseball America's Minor League Manager of the Year.

== Playing career ==
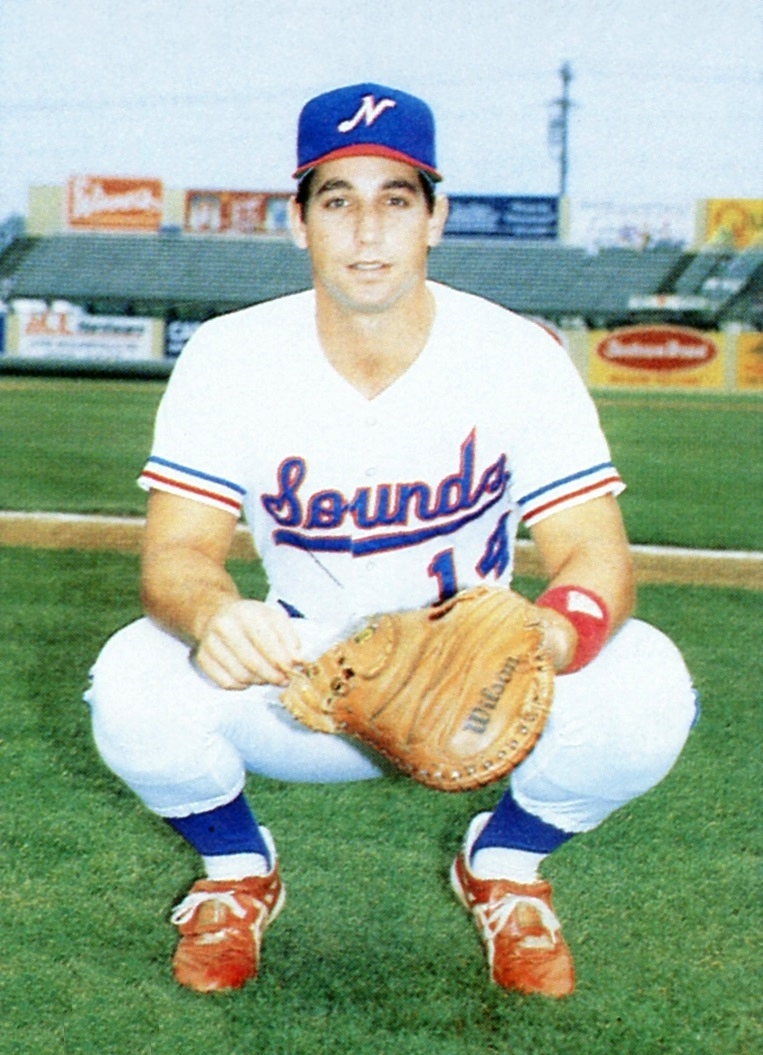
DeFrancesco with the Nashville Sounds in 1988

DeFrancesco played three seasons at Seton Hall for head coach Mike Sheppard. In 1982 and 1983, he played collegiate summer baseball with the Harwich Mariners of the Cape Cod Baseball League, helping lead the club to the league title in 1983. DeFrancesco was selected in the ninth round of the 1984 draft by the Boston Red Sox. During a nine-year minor league playing career, DeFrancesco played in 567 games and advanced as high as AAA, but never played in the majors.

== Managerial and coaching career ==
=== Minor Leagues ===
After retiring as a player, DeFrancesco began his managing career in 1994 with the Arizona League Athletics.

In 2003 Tony DeFrancesco moved up to the Pacific Coast League's Sacramento River Cats, where he led the team to a 92-52 record in his first year, earning him the 2003 Minor League Manager of the Year from The Sporting News. DeFrancesco would continue to lead the River Cats to PCL championships in 2004 and 2007. In 2008, DeFrancesco became the third base coach for the Oakland Athletics.

In 2009, Oakland announced that DeFrancesco would return to the Sacramento River Cats as manager, replacing Todd Steverson.

On November 30, 2010, the Athletics announced that Darren Bush would replace DeFrancesco as manager of the River Cats.

=== Houston Astros ===
On August 19, 2012, the Astros announced DeFrancesco would be the interim manager of the major league team for the remainder of the 2012 season, replacing Brad Mills. He won his first game in his fifth game as manager when the Astros defeated the New York Mets on August 24. With his appointment late in the 2012 season, DeFrancesco served as the final manager of the Astros as a National League franchise. He finished with a record of 16 wins and 25 losses. The Astros were in the midst of a major rebuild at the time, and on the way to their second consecutive 100-loss season; DeFrancesco's .390 winning percentage was actually a significant upgrade over the .322 win percentage the 2012 team had achieved before DeFrancesco's tenure.

=== Return to the minors ===
He was the manager of the Triple-A Fresno Grizzlies from 2015 to 2017. During his first season, he led the Central Valley team to become the Triple-A champions. It was the team's first time winning the Triple-A championship in 18 seasons. Tony DeFrancesco then won Baseball America Minor League Manager of the Year Award.

DeFrancesco was named manager of the AAA Las Vegas 51s of the New York Mets organization for the 2018 season. He stayed as the Mets moved their AAA team to upstate New York, remaining manager of the 2019 Syracuse Mets in their inaugural season. He led Syracuse to a 75—66 record, their first winning record since 2014, but did not make the playoffs after losing the division tie-breaker game to the Scranton/Wilkes-Barre RailRiders.

He was interviewed as a possible candidate to become the next Mets manager in their search during the 2019 offseason. The job ultimately went to Carlos Beltrán.

=== New York Mets ===
On December 8, 2019, DeFrancesco was named the first base coach for the New York Mets. After the 2020 season, he was replaced by Tony Tarasco at first base while being reassigned within the organization.

=== Dorados de Chihuahua ===
On September 3, 2026, DeFrancesco was named manager for the Dorados de Chihuahua of the Mexican League for the upcoming 2027 season.

== Managerial record ==
Team	From	To	Regular season record				Post–season record			
Team	From	To	G	W	L	Win %	G	W	L	Win %
Houston Astros	2012	2012	41	16	25	.390	—			
Total			41	16	25	.390	0	0	0	–
