= Jordan Schafer =

American baseball player (born 1986)

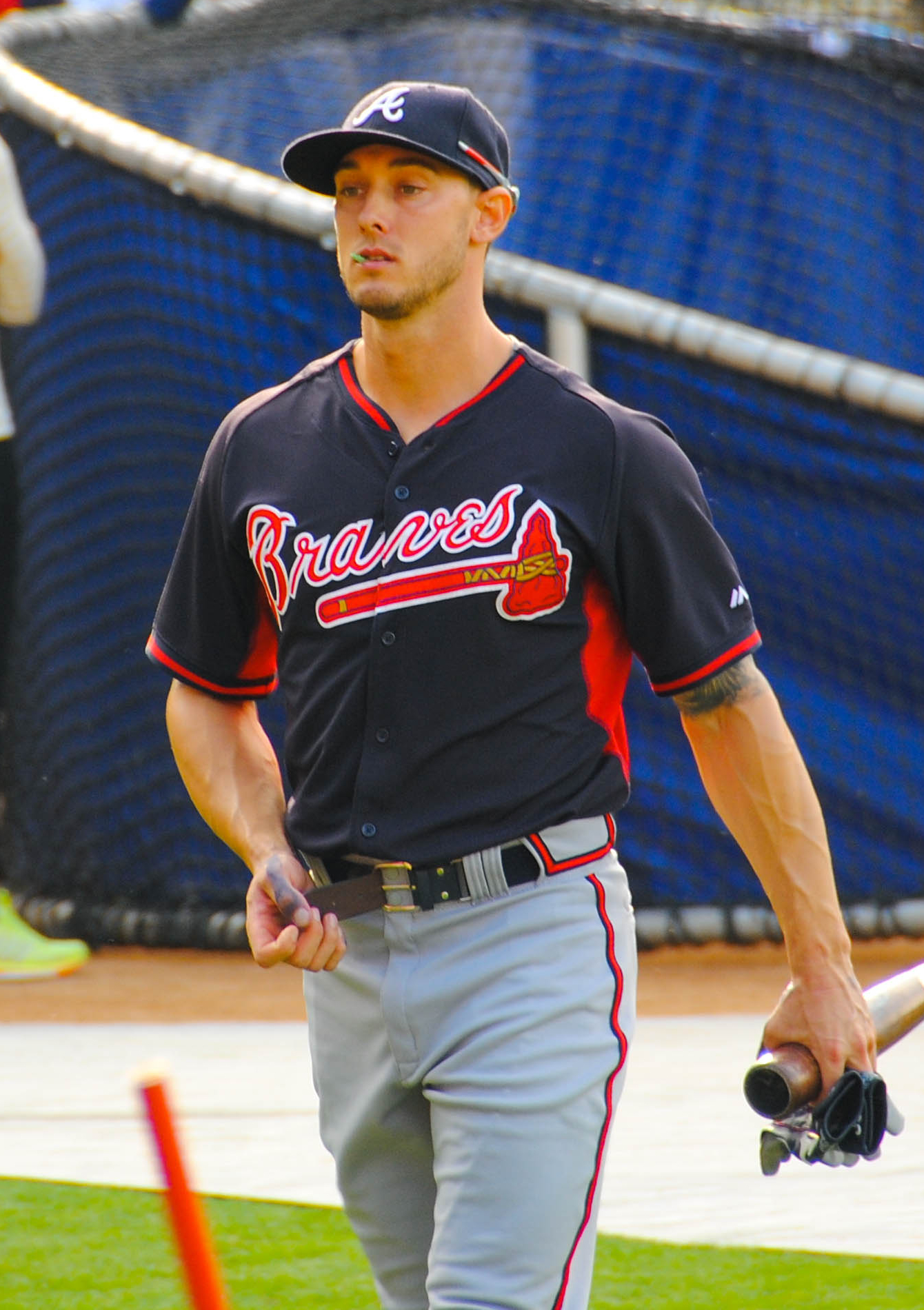
- Schafer with the Atlanta Braves
- Center fielder
- Born: September 4, 1986 (age 39); Hammond, Indiana, U.S.
- Batted: Left Threw: Left

MLB debut
- April 5, 2009, for the Atlanta Braves

Last MLB appearance
- May 10, 2015, for the Minnesota Twins

Career statistics
- Batting average: .228
- Home runs: 12
- Runs batted in: 85
- Stolen bases: 103
- Stats at Baseball Reference

Teams
- Atlanta Braves (2009, 2011); Houston Astros (2011–2012); Atlanta Braves (2013–2014); Minnesota Twins (2014–2015)

Jordan James Schafer (born September 4, 1986) is an American former professional baseball center fielder. He played in Major League Baseball (MLB) for the Atlanta Braves, Houston Astros, and Minnesota Twins.

== Baseball career ==
=== Atlanta Braves ===
Schafer was drafted by the Atlanta Braves in the third round of the 2005 Major League Baseball draft out of Winter Haven High School. In April 2008 he was suspended 50 games by Major League Baseball after being accused of HGH use. He was the first player to be suspended by Major League Baseball's Department of Investigations.

Schafer was named the Braves' starting center fielder for the 2009 season on April 3, 2009, despite never having played at a higher level than Double-A. He made his major league debut on April 5, 2009, becoming the 99th player in Major League Baseball history to hit his first career home run in his first major league at-bat, off Brett Myers of the Philadelphia Phillies. He finished the game 2 for 3, with the home run, a single, an intentional walk, and a strikeout.

On June 2, 2009, Schafer was optioned to Triple-A Gwinnett Braves after batting only .204 with 63 strikeouts in 167 at-bats. He was called back up to the major league team on May 24, 2011.

=== Houston Astros ===
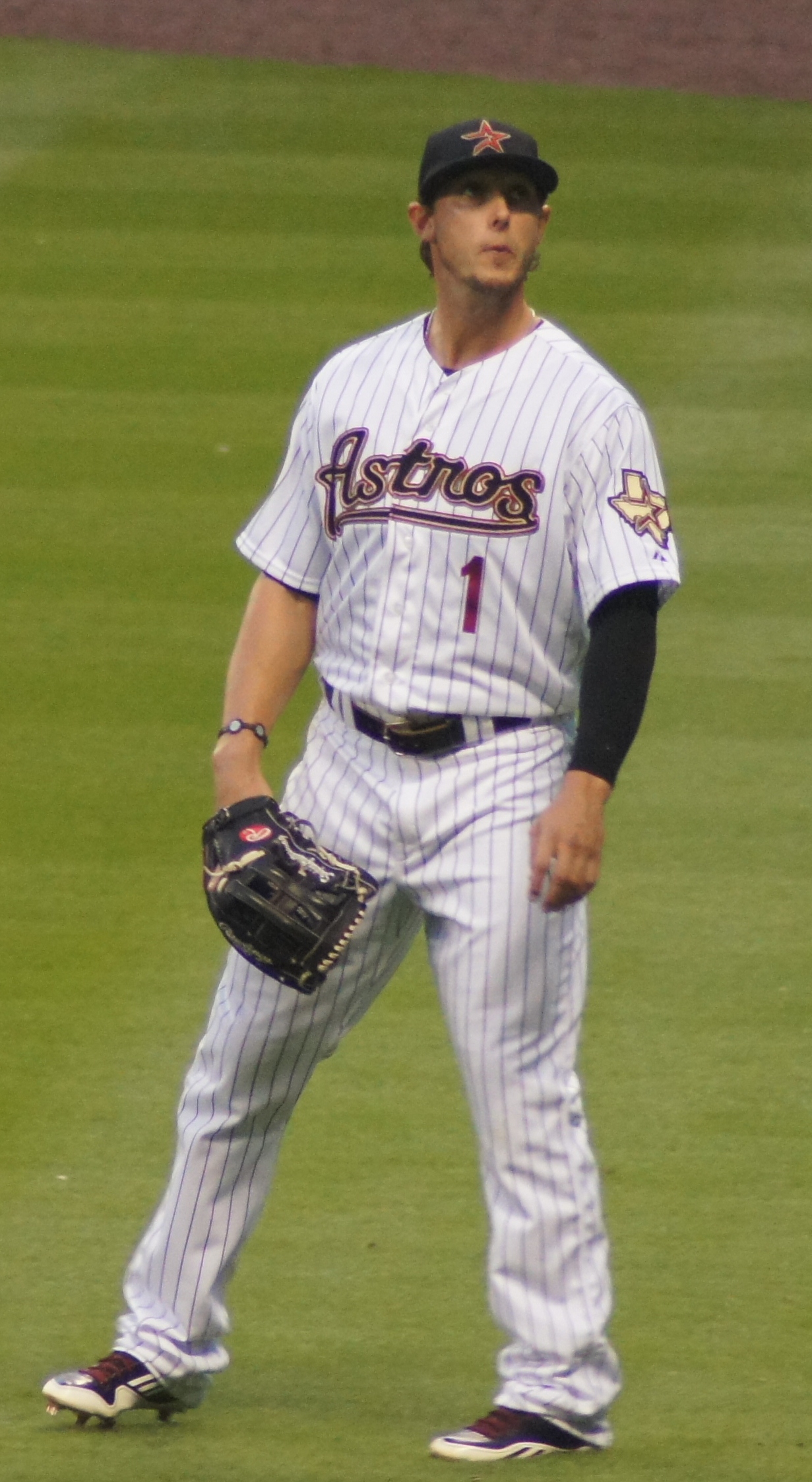
Schafer during his tenure with the Houston Astros in 2012

On July 31, 2011, Schafer was traded with Juan Abreu, Paul Clemens, and Brett Oberholtzer to the Houston Astros in exchange for Michael Bourn.

On April 29, 2012, Schafer was ejected from a game by umpire Marvin Hudson after disputing an out call on an attempted steal.

=== Atlanta Braves (second stint) ===
On November 1, 2012, the Atlanta Braves reacquired Schafer from the Astros via waivers. Schafer was placed on the disabled list on July 4, 2013, with a stress fracture in his ankle. In 94 games for Atlanta in 2013, he batted .247/.331/.346 with three home runs, 21 RBI, and 22 stolen bases.

Schafer played in 63 games for the Braves in 2014, hitting .163/.256/.213 with two RBI and 15 stolen bases. He was designated for assignment by the Braves on August 1, 2014.

=== Minnesota Twins ===
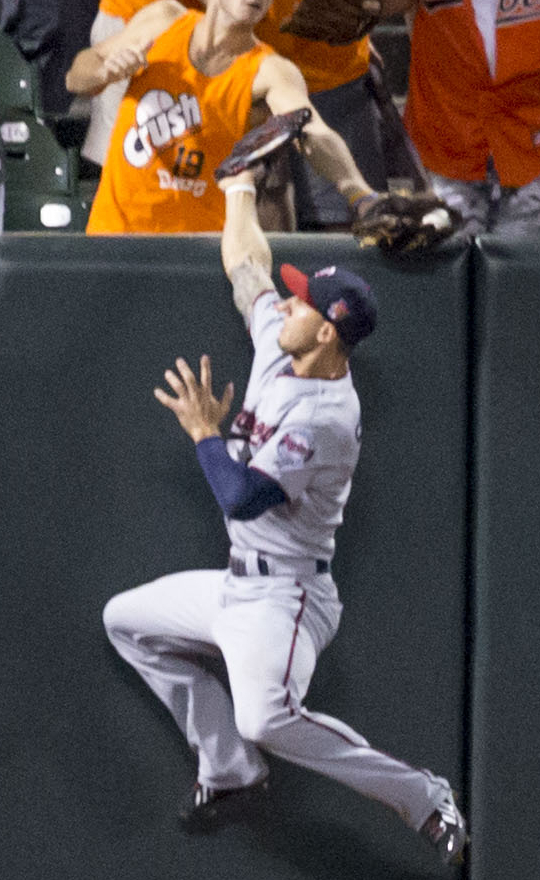
Schafer during his tenure with the Minnesota Twins in 2014

Schafer was claimed off waivers by the Minnesota Twins on August 3, 2014. He played in 41 games for Minnesota, slashing .285/.345/.362 with one home run, 13 RBI, and 15 stolen bases. Schafer was named the Twins' 2015 Opening Day center fielder. In 27 contests, he hit .217/.250/.261 with no home runs and five RBI. The team released Schafer on June 18 to make room for an influx of outfield prospects.

=== Los Angeles Dodgers ===
Schafer signed a minor league contract with the Los Angeles Dodgers on January 13, 2016. The Dodgers converted him to a pitcher and assigned him to the Double-A Tulsa Drillers of the Texas League. He performed well enough that he was selected to participate in the mid-season Texas League All-Star Game. He pitched in 31 games for Tulsa, six for the Triple-A Oklahoma City Dodgers and another three for the Arizona League Dodgers. Overall, he was 1–1 with a 4.93 ERA in 49 1/3 innings. Schafer elected free agency following the season on November 7.

=== St. Louis Cardinals ===
On December 12, 2016, Schafer signed a minor league contract with the St. Louis Cardinals. He joined the team for spring training, during which, on March 14, 2017, it was announced that Schafer would undergo surgery on his left elbow. He missed the entire season.

Invited to spring training in 2018, he was among six cut to minor-league camp on March 4. He was released on March 12.

=== San Francisco Giants ===
On April 3, 2018, Schafer signed a minor league contract with the San Francisco Giants. In 7 games for the Triple–A Sacramento River Cats, he compiled a 5.68 ERA with 9 strikeouts across 6 1/3 innings pitched. Schafer was released by the Giants organization on June 9.

== See also ==
- List of Major League Baseball players with a home run in their first major league at bat
