= Brad Mills (baseball manager) =

American baseball player, coach, and manager (born 1957)

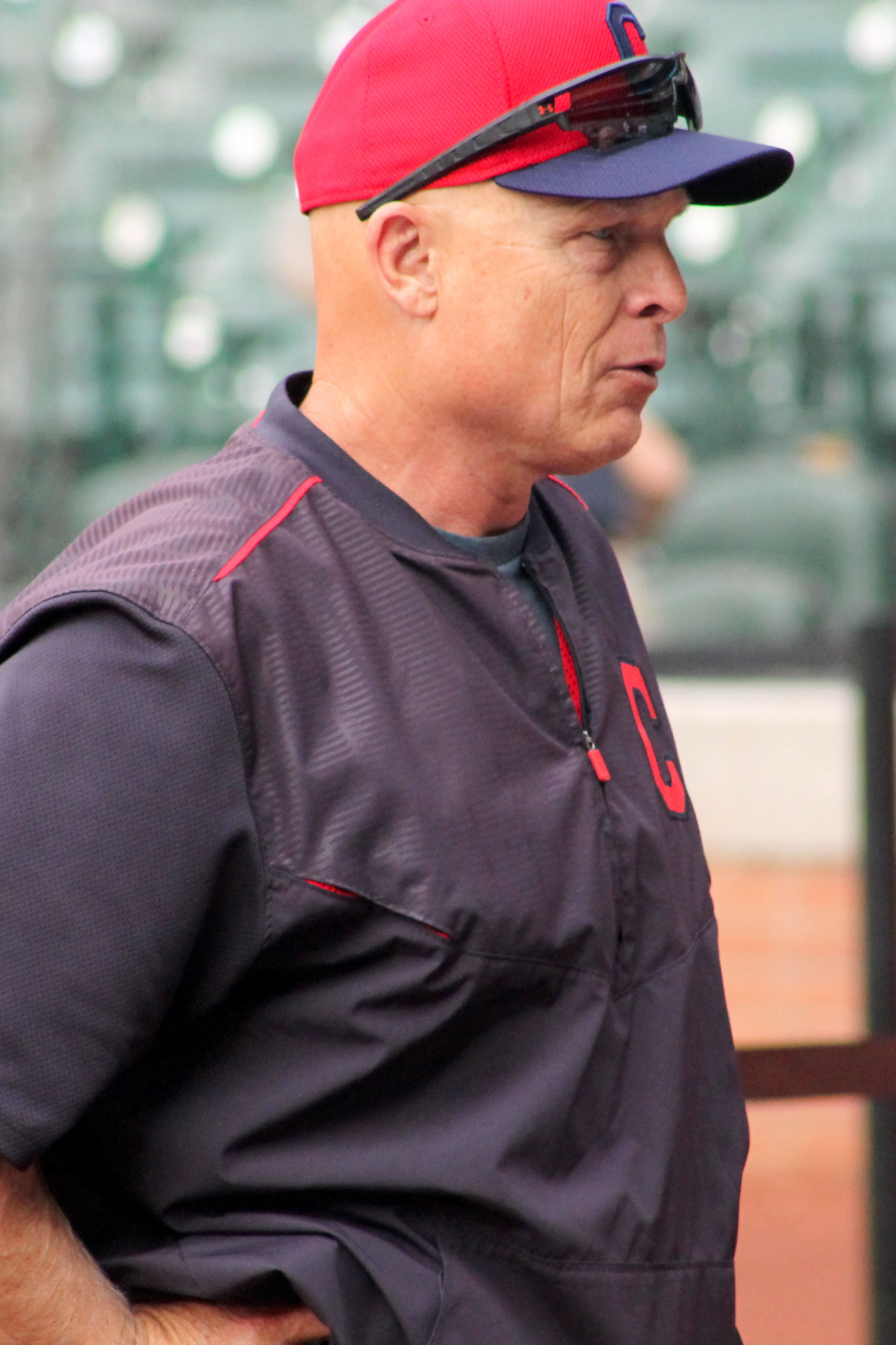
- Mills with the Cleveland Indians
- Infielder / Manager / Coach
- Born: January 19, 1957 (age 69); Exeter, California, U.S.
- Batted: Left Threw: Right

MLB debut
- June 8, 1980, for the Montreal Expos

Last MLB appearance
- October 2, 1983, for the Montreal Expos

MLB statistics
- Batting average: .256
- Home runs: 1
- Runs batted in: 12
- Managerial record: 171–274
- Winning %: .384
- Stats at Baseball Reference
- Managerial record at Baseball Reference

Teams
- As player: Montreal Expos (1980–1983); As manager: Houston Astros (2010–2012); As coach: Philadelphia Phillies (1997–2000); Montreal Expos (2003); Boston Red Sox (2004–2009); Cleveland Indians (2013–2019); Cincinnati Reds (2025)

Career highlights and awards
- 2× World Series champion (2004, 2007)

James Bradley Mills (born January 19, 1957) is an American former professional baseball player, coach, and manager. He played in Major League Baseball (MLB) as an infielder for the Montreal Expos from 1980 to 1983. He managed the Houston Astros from 2010 to 2012, and served as a coach in MLB for the Expos, Philadelphia Phillies, Boston Red Sox, Cleveland Indians, and Cincinnati Reds.

== Early life ==
Mills was educated at Exeter Union High School in Exeter, California, College of the Sequoias, and the University of Arizona, where he played college baseball for the Arizona Wildcats. He was drafted in the 17th round by the Montreal Expos.

== Baseball career ==
=== Playing career ===
Mills reached the major leagues in 1980 and had a .256 batting average with one home run and 12 runs batted in through 106 games played for the Expos (1980–83). He divided his time between Triple-A and the majors in each of those seasons, and sustained a right knee injury ending his playing career at the age of 29. A full-time left-handed hitter and primarily a third baseman, he also saw time at first base and second base. In 1983, Mills was Nolan Ryan's 3,509th career strikeout victim, lifting Ryan past Walter Johnson as the all-time strikeout leader.

=== Post-playing career ===
Mills managed eleven seasons in the minors in the Cubs, Rockies and Dodgers organizations (1987–2002), and also served as an advance scout for the Cubs. Mills was Terry Francona's first-base coach with the Philadelphia Phillies in 1997–2000. In 2003, Mills served as the Montreal Expos bench coach. From 2004 to 2009, Mills was teamed again with Francona when he served as the bench coach for the Boston Red Sox.

=== Houston Astros manager ===
On October 27, 2009, Mills was named manager of the Houston Astros, replacing interim manager Dave Clark; he was hired after Manny Acta declined (he elected to manage the Cleveland Indians).

The 2010 season, the first under Mills, was a year of transition for the Astros as they traded away franchise stars Lance Berkman and Roy Oswalt at the trade deadline, following an underwhelming start, which included an 0–8 start to the season, and 17–34 record through the end of May. However, they would finish the season strong, going 59–52 the rest of the way, and 34–27 after the trade deadline, finishing with 76–86 record, good enough for fourth in the NL Central. This strong finish earned Mills a single third place vote in National League Manager of the Year voting, in which he finished sixth.

The 2011 season was much less appealing for both Mills and the Astros, as they suffered the franchise's first ever 100-loss season, finishing with a dubious record of 56–106, as the team traded away more former All-Stars to slash payroll such as Hunter Pence and Michael Bourn, opening up opportunities for future All-Stars such as Jose Altuve and J.D. Martinez.

The 2012 season was eerily similar to the previous season as the Astros once again struggled to win games, never rising above .500 after April, and by the summer, rumors spread of a potential firing of Mills. The team had new ownership during the year as Jim Crane purchased the team from previous owner Drayton McLane the previous fall. Mills was fired on August 18, 2012 along with hitting coach Mike Barnett and first base coach Bobby Meacham. He was succeeded on an interim basis by Oklahoma City RedHawks manager Tony DeFrancesco, as named by first-year general manager Jeff Luhnow. For his part, Mills stated that some of the responsibility was on his part for how the team did, not wanting to point the finger at anybody. The team would go on to finish the season with 100+ losses for the second consecutive year.

=== Cleveland Indians ===
On October 31, 2012, Mills was hired as the third base coach of the Cleveland Indians, to work with Francona again. Mills was reassigned as the Indians bench coach in 2014. While coaching for the Boston Red Sox under Francona from 2004 to 2009 he was in the same position. On July 11, 2017, Mills managed the American League All-Star team while Francona dealt with a health issue.

On July 5, 2020, Mills announced he would be opting out of the 2020 season due to the COVID-19 pandemic. The Indians subsequently announced on October 30, 2020 that Mills will not return as bench coach for the 2021 season, but would remain with the club in an undetermined role.

=== Cincinnati Reds ===
On November 12, 2024, Mills was hired to serve as the bench coach for the Cincinnati Reds. On November 3, 2025, Mills announced his retirement from professional baseball.

=== Managerial record ===
Team	Year	Regular season					Postseason			
Team	Year	Games	Won	Lost	Win %	Finish	Won	Lost	Win %	Result
HOU	2010	162	76	86	.469	4th in NL Central	–	–	–	
HOU	2011	162	56	106	.346	6th in NL Central	–	–	–	
HOU	2012	121	39	82	.322	Fired	–	–	–	
Total		445	171	274	.384		–	–	–	

Managerial/Coaching positions
Preceded by Tony Franklin	Wytheville Cubs Manager; 1987	Succeeded by Steve Roadcap
Preceded by Hal Dyer	Charleston Wheelers Manager; 1988	Succeeded by Greg Mahlberg
Preceded by Jim Tracy	Peoria Chiefs Manager; 1989	Succeeded by Greg Mahlberg
Preceded by Jay Loviglio	Winston-Salem Spirits Manager; 1990–1991	Succeeded by Bill Hayes
Preceded by Mick Kelleher	Iowa Cubs Manager; 1992	Succeeded by Marv Foley
Preceded by Charlie Manuel	Colorado Springs Sky Sox Manager; 1993–1996	Succeeded by Paul Zuvella
Preceded by Dave Cash	Philadelphia Phillies First Base Coach; 1997–2000	Succeeded by Tony Scott
Preceded by Rick Sofield	Las Vegas 51s Manager; 2002	Succeeded by John Shoemaker
Preceded by Wendell Kim	Montreal Expos Bench Coach; 2003	Succeeded by Eddie Rodriguez
Preceded by Jerry Narron	Boston Red Sox Bench Coach; 2004–2009	Succeeded by DeMarlo Hale
Preceded by Steve Smith	Cleveland Indians Third base Coach; 2013	Succeeded by Mike Sarbaugh
Preceded by Sandy Alomar Jr.	Cleveland Indians Bench Coach; 2014–2019	Succeeded by DeMarlo Hale
