= Fernando Rodriguez (baseball) =

American baseball player (born 1984)

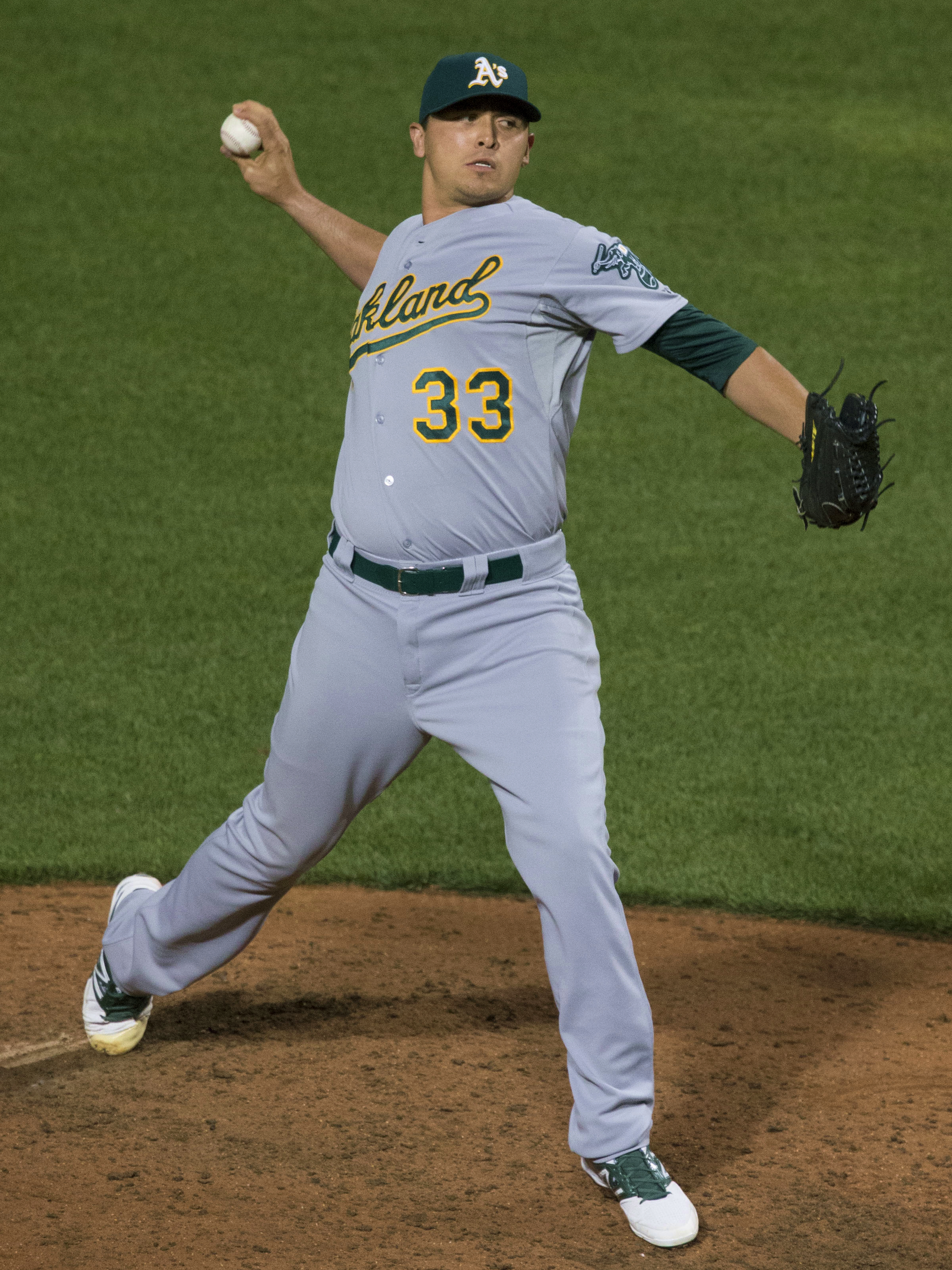
- Rodriguez with the Oakland Athletics
- Relief pitcher
- Born: June 18, 1984 (age 42); El Paso, Texas, U.S.
- Batted: Right Threw: Right

MLB debut
- May 2, 2009, for the Los Angeles Angels of Anaheim

Last MLB appearance
- July 3, 2016, for the Oakland Athletics

MLB statistics
- Win–loss record: 11–15
- Earned run average: 4.35
- Strikeouts: 242
- Stats at Baseball Reference

Teams
- Los Angeles Angels of Anaheim (2009); Houston Astros (2011–2012); Oakland Athletics (2014–2016)

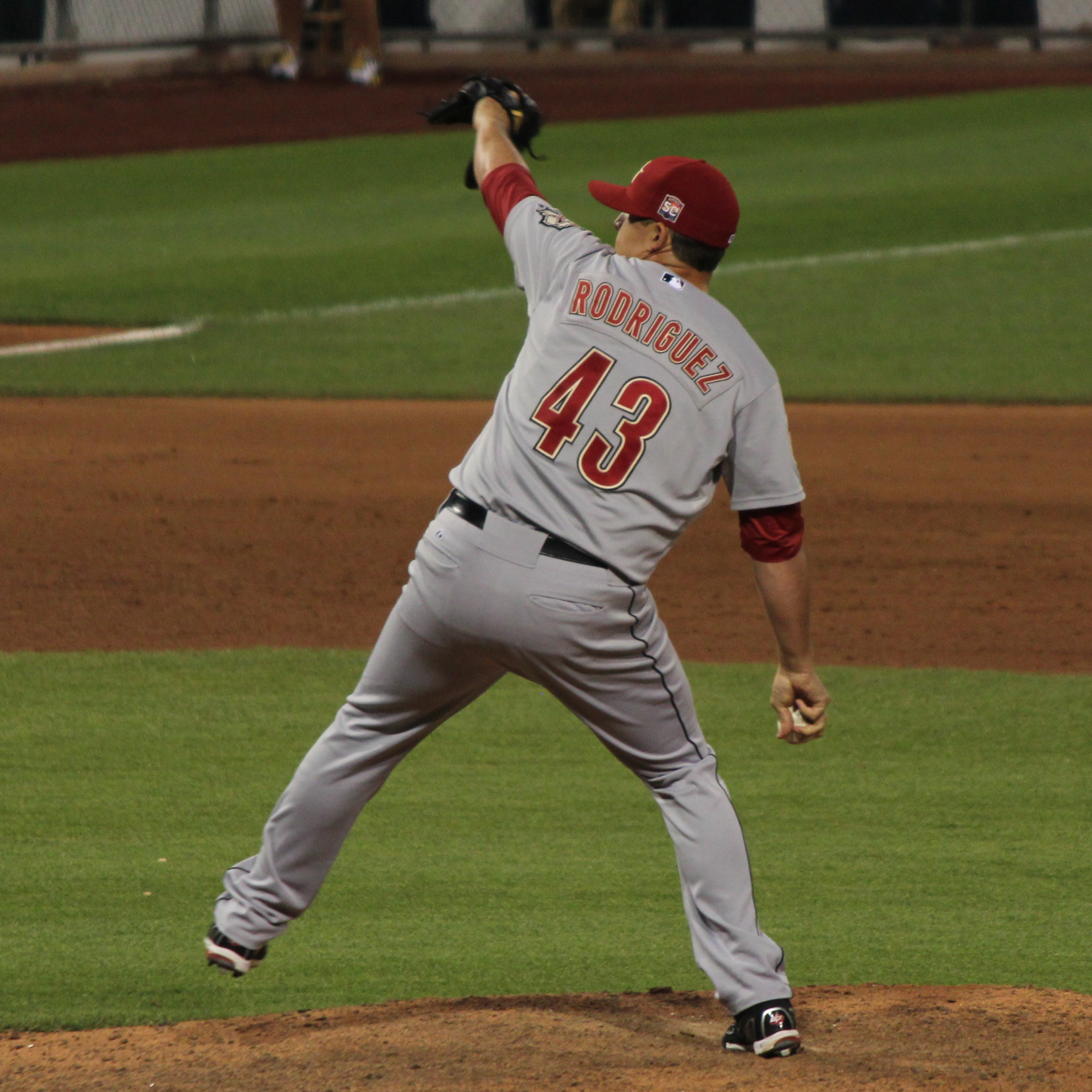
Rodriguez pitching for the Houston Astros in 2012

Fernando Rodriguez (born June 18, 1984) is an American former professional baseball pitcher. He played in Major League Baseball (MLB) for the Los Angeles Angels of Anaheim, Houston Astros, and Oakland Athletics. Rodriguez throws and bats right-handed, and is listed at 6 feet 3 inches (1.91 m) and 235 pounds (107 kg). He made his MLB debut in May 2009.

== Career ==
=== Los Angeles Angels ===
Rodriguez was selected by the Los Angeles Angels in the 11th round of the 2003 Major League Baseball draft, and signed with the club on June 25, 2003. He played in the Angels' farm system from 2003 through 2010. He made his major league debut against the New York Yankees on May 2, 2009, at Yankee Stadium, pitching 2/3 of an inning in relief, giving up three runs (two earned) on a hit and two walks; it was his only MLB appearance with the Angels. Rodriguez became a free agent on November 6, 2010.

=== Houston Astros ===
Rodriguez signed with the Houston Astros on November 10, 2010. He was assigned to the Triple-A Oklahoma City RedHawks. On May 17, 2011, Rodriguez was called up by the Astros. He made his first appearance with the team on May 28, and would go on to appear in 47 games during the season, recording a 3.96 ERA and 2–3 record. In 2012, Rodriguez made 71 appearances with Houston, registering a 2–10 record with 5.37 ERA.

=== Oakland Athletics ===
In February 2013, the Astros traded Rodriguez and Jed Lowrie to the Oakland Athletics for Chris Carter, Brad Peacock, and Max Stassi. Rodriguez had season-ending Tommy John surgery on March 28, and missed the entire 2013 season.

Rodriguez signed a one-year contract with the Athletics for 2014, avoiding arbitration. However, he was designated for assignment by the A's on December 18, 2013, only a couple weeks after signing the deal, removing him from the 40-man roster to allow for pitcher Eury De La Rosa to be added from the Arizona Diamondbacks. Rodriguez was ultimately assigned to the Triple-A Sacramento River Cats, re-added to the 40-man roster, and made seven MLB appearances for Oakland during the 2014 season, recording an ERA of 1.00 in seven appearances.

In 2015, Rodriguez made 56 appearances with the A's, pitching to a 4–2 record with 3.84 ERA in 56 relief appearances. In 2016, he made 34 relief appearances, with a 4.20 ERA and 2–0 record. Rodriguez was sent outright to Triple-A after the 2016 season, and elected to become a free agent.

=== Chicago Cubs ===
On December 24, 2016, Rodriguez signed a minor league contract with the Chicago Cubs. He was assigned to the Triple-A Iowa Cubs for 2017. Rodriguez was released on July 17, 2017, after making nine appearances and posting a 3.09 ERA.

=== Boston Red Sox ===
Rodriguez signed a minor league contract with the Boston Red Sox on August 17, 2017. He made two appearances with the rookie-level Gulf Coast League Red Sox late in the season. For the 2018 season, Rodriguez was assigned to the Triple-A Pawtucket Red Sox. In 30 games for Pawtucket, he registered a 3–4 record and 3.20 ERA with 71 strikeouts across 64 2/3 innings pitched. Rodriguez elected free agency following the season on November 2, 2018.

=== San Diego Padres ===
On January 24, 2019, Rodriguez signed a minor league contract with the San Diego Padres. In 18 appearances (three starts) for the Triple-A El Paso Chihuahuas, he logged a 2-1 record and 5.91 ERA with 40 strikeouts and four saves over 32 innings of work. Rodriguez was released by the Padres organization on June 2.
