= Kyle Weiland =

American baseball player (born 1986)

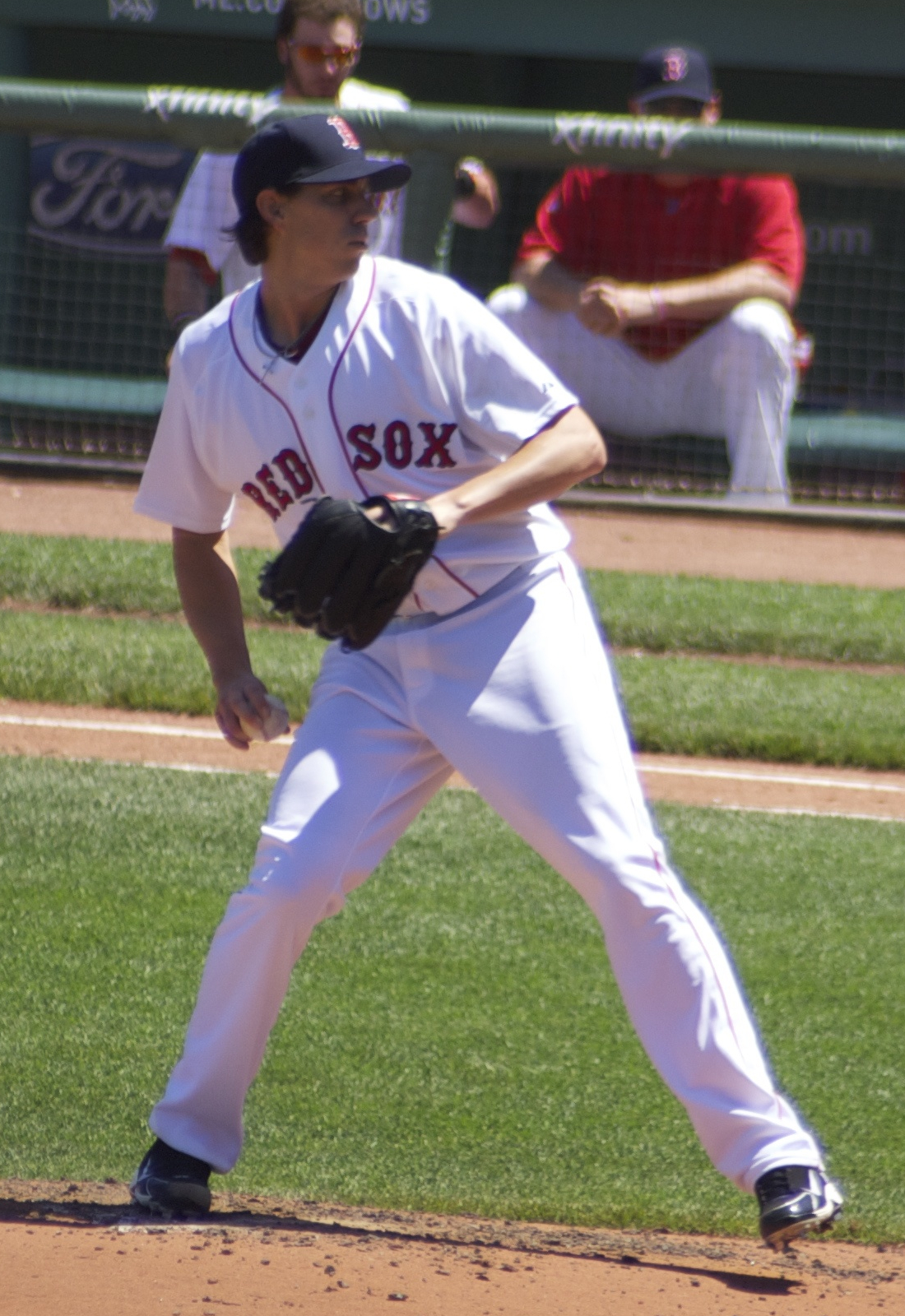
- Weiland with the Boston Red Sox
- Pitcher
- Born: September 12, 1986 (age 38); Albuquerque, New Mexico, U.S.
- Batted: Right Threw: Right

MLB debut
- July 10, 2011, for the Boston Red Sox

Last MLB appearance
- April 24, 2012, for the Houston Astros

MLB statistics
- Win–loss record: 0–6
- Earned run average: 7.23
- Strikeouts: 26
- Stats at Baseball Reference

Teams
- Boston Red Sox (2011); Houston Astros (2012)

Kyle Edward Weiland (born September 12, 1986) is an American former professional baseball pitcher. He played in Major League Baseball (MLB) for the Boston Red Sox and Houston Astros.

== Career ==
=== Boston Red Sox ===
Weiland attended the University of Notre Dame, where he played for the Notre Dame Fighting Irish baseball team. In 2007, he played collegiate summer baseball with the Falmouth Commodores of the Cape Cod Baseball League. He was drafted by the Red Sox in the 3rd round of the 2008 Major League Baseball draft.

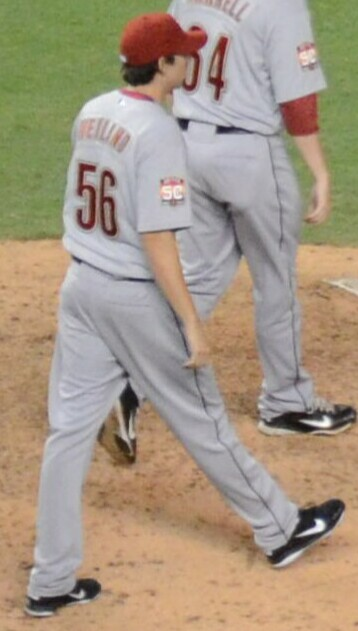
Weiland during his tenure with the Houston Astros in 2012

Weiland made his Major League debut on July 10, 2011 against the Baltimore Orioles. He started and pitched 4+ innings, before being ejected for hitting Vladimir Guerrero with no outs in the 5th. In his debut, he made several Red Sox firsts, namely: first New Mexico native to play with the Red Sox; first Red Sox player to wear #70 in a game and the first Red Sox player to be ejected in his first major league game.

=== Houston Astros ===
On December 14, 2011, Weiland was traded to the Houston Astros along with Jed Lowrie in exchange for Mark Melancon He earned a spot in the Astros' starting rotation at the beginning of the 2012 season. Weiland was diagnosed with a right shoulder infection and was shut down for the rest of the 2012 season. On November 1, 2012, he was removed from the 40-man roster and sent outright to the Triple-A Oklahoma City RedHawks.

Weiland subsequently missed the 2013 season because of injury. In February, 2014, Weiland attempted a comeback after battling an infection in his shoulder and abdomen. He announced his retirement from professional baseball on March 29, 2015.

== Scouting report ==
Weiland throws 4 pitches: a two-seam and four seam fastball, a curveball and a cutter.
