= Joe Sclafani =

American baseball player

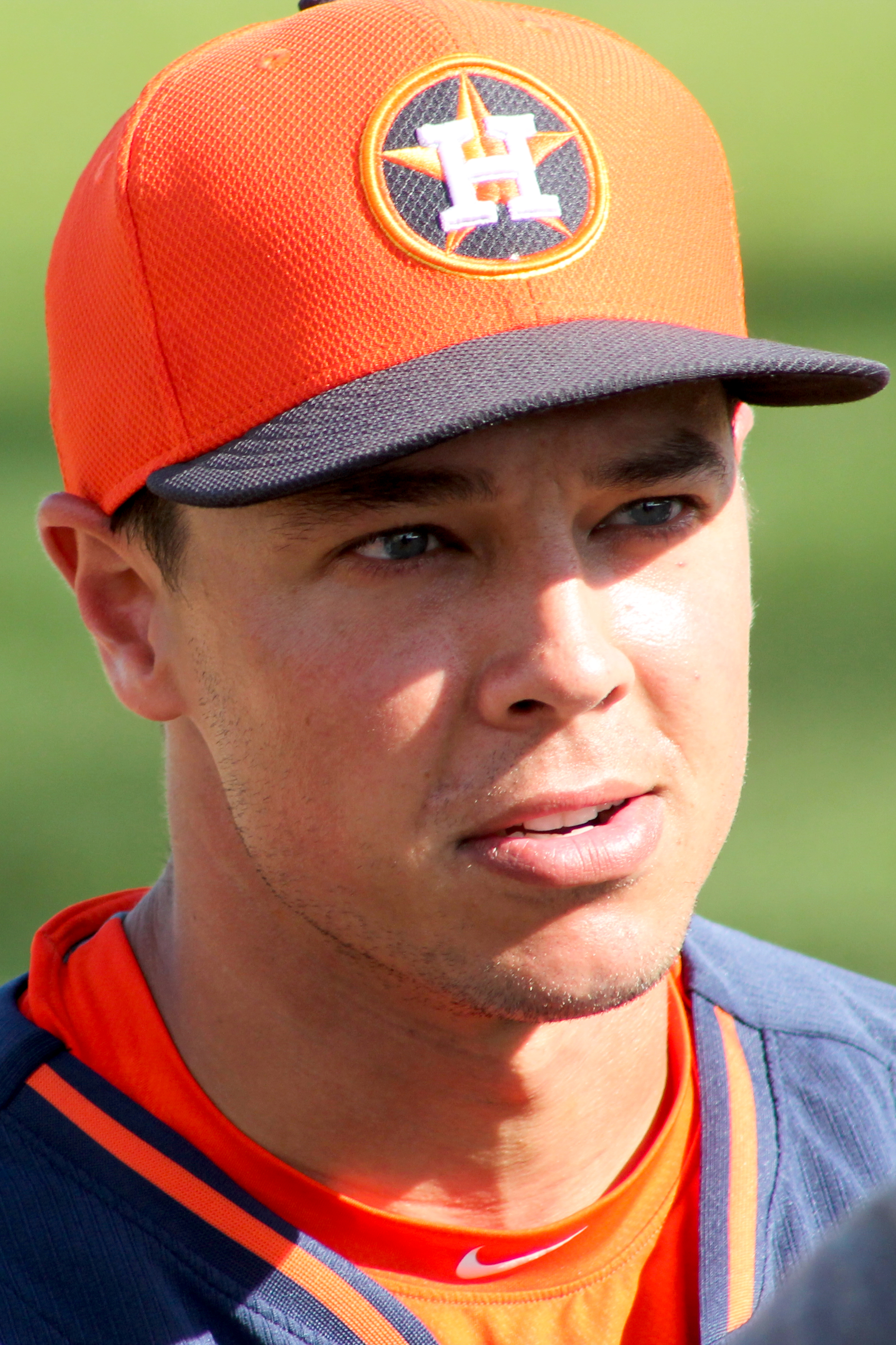
- Sclafani at spring training in 2015
- Infielder
- Born: April 22, 1990 (age 35); Brooklyn, New York, U.S.
- Bats: Switch Throws: Right
- Stats at Baseball Reference
Medals
Men's baseball
Representing United States
WBSC Premier12
Silver medal – second place	2015 Tokyo	Team

Joe Carlo Sclafani (born April 22, 1990) is an American former professional baseball infielder. He was drafted by the Houston Astros in the 14th round in 2012.

== Amateur career ==
Sclafani played college baseball at Dartmouth College from 2009 to 2012. He played in 172 games, hitting .326/.408/.490 with 11 home runs and an Ivy League record 19 triples.

== Professional career ==
Sclafani was drafted by the Houston Astros in the 14th round of the 2012 MLB draft. He signed with the Astros and made his professional debut with the Tri-City ValleyCats. In 2013, he started with the Quad Cities River Bandits and was promoted to the Lancaster JetHawks during the season. In 2014, Sclafani started with the Double-A Corpus Christi Hooks and was promoted to the Triple-A Oklahoma City RedHawks. In 2015, Sclafani spent time with the Hooks and Fresno Grizzlies. He was invited to major league spring training for the 2016 season but was released on March 31, 2016.

== Post-baseball career ==
In June 2016, Sclafani joined the Toronto Blue Jays player development department as an assistant. Sclafani was promoted to a coordinator for the 2018 season and became the assistant director of player development in January 2019. On January 27, 2022, Sclafani was promoted to the title of Director of Player Development.
