= C. J. Fick =

American baseball player (born 1985)

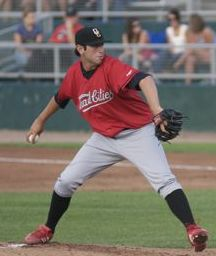
- Fick with the Quad Cities River Bandits in 2008
- Pitcher
- Born: November 20, 1985 (age 40); Thousand Oaks, California, U.S.
- Batted: Right Threw: Right

MLB debut
- May 26, 2012, for the St. Louis Cardinals

Last appearance
- October 2, 2012, for the Houston Astros

MLB statistics
- Win–loss record: 0–1
- Earned run average: 4.38
- Strikeouts: 17

CPBL statistics
- Win–loss record: 0–3
- Earned run average: 6.75
- Strikeouts: 7
- Stats at Baseball Reference

Teams
- St. Louis Cardinals (2012); Houston Astros (2012); EDA Rhinos (2015)
Medals
Men's baseball
Representing United States
Pan American Games
Silver medal – second place	2011 Guadalajara	National team

Charles Joseph Fick (born November 20, 1985), formerly known as Chuckie Fick, is an American former professional baseball pitcher. He played in Major League Baseball (MLB) for the St. Louis Cardinals and Houston Astros.

== Professional career ==
Fick was selected by the Cardinals out of Cal State Northridge in the 15th round of the 2007 MLB draft.

In 2007, Fick spent his first professional season with the Rookie-Level Johnson City Cardinals and the Single-A Quad Cities River Bandits in the Midwest League. He earned a win in his debut with Johnson City after pitching three innings with four strikeouts on June 20. He went 1–0 with 12 strikeouts and a 1.29 ERA in eight games. Fick debuted for Quad Cities of the Midwest League on July 27 and tossed two scoreless innings. He went 1–0 with 15 strikeouts and a 2.16 ERA in nine games. He went a combined 2–0 with 25 strikeouts, two saves and a 1.85 ERA in 39 innings pitched.

In 2008 Fick went 6–5 with a 3.17 ERA in 20 games, 13 starts, with Quad Cities. He struck out a season-high eight on August 3.

In 2009, he was promoted to the Class-A Advanced Palm Beach Cardinals, going 3–3 with a 4.92 ERA in 20 games, seven starts. With the Double-A Springfield Cardinals, Fick went 1–2 with a 1.50 ERA in 10 games, three starts. Fick went a combined 4–7 with 51 strikeouts, one save and a 3.96 ERA in 97 2/3 innings.

In 2010, he advanced to the Triple-A Memphis.

On May 26, 2012, Fick was promoted to St. Louis to replace struggling Fernando Salas in the bullpen. Fick was 1–0 with 2 saves and a 3.86 ERA in 21 games at Memphis. He was designated for assignment on July 25.

Fick was claimed off waivers by the Houston Astros on July 27. The Houston Astros released him on June 12, 2013. He signed a minor league contract with the Colorado Rockies on June 13, 2013, and was assigned to the Colorado Springs Sky Sox.

On April 2, 2014, Fick signed with the Olmecas de Tabasco of the Mexican League. On April 29, 2014, Fick was released.

On March 5, 2015, Fick signed with the Lancaster Barnstormers of the Atlantic League of Professional Baseball.

Fick signed with the EDA Rhinos of the Chinese Professional Baseball League in May 2015. He made his CPBL debut on May 25, 2015, against the Chinatrust Brothers.

== International career ==
Fick played for the United States national baseball team in the summer of 2011. He appeared in the Pan American Games, where the United States won silver.

== Personal ==
Fick is the nephew of former MLB All Star Robert Fick.
