= Wilton López =

Nicaraguan baseball player (born 1983)

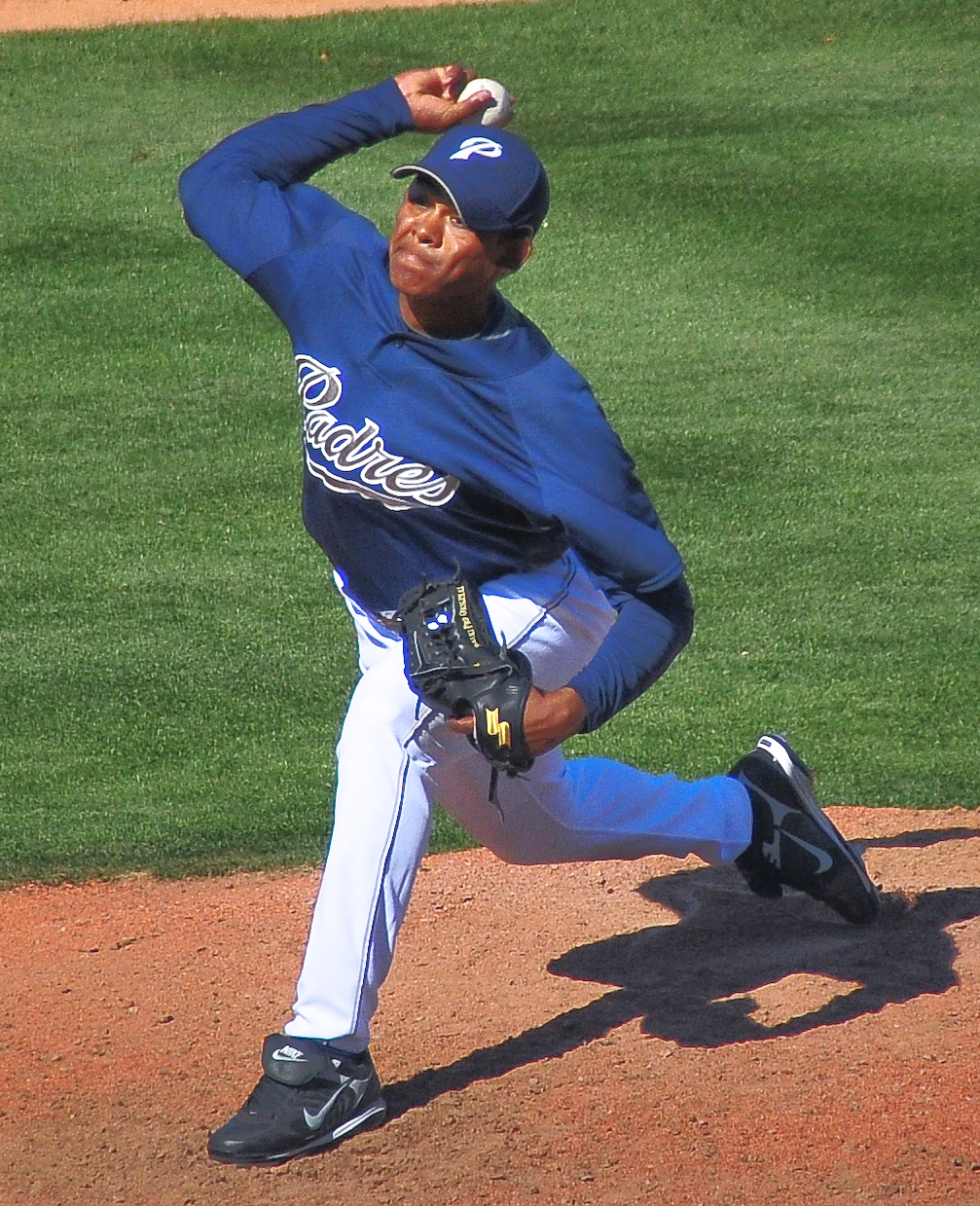
- López with the San Diego Padres
- Pitcher
- Born: July 19, 1983 (age 42); León, Nicaragua
- Batted: Switch Threw: Right

MLB debut
- August 28, 2009, for the Houston Astros

Last MLB appearance
- April 8, 2014, for the Colorado Rockies

MLB statistics
- Win–loss record: 16–17
- Earned run average: 3.54
- Strikeouts: 221
- Stats at Baseball Reference

Teams
- Houston Astros (2009–2012); Colorado Rockies (2013–2014)
Medals
Men's baseball
Representing Nicaragua
Pan American Games
Bronze medal – third place	2019 Lima	Team

Wilton López (born July 19, 1983) is a Nicaraguan former professional baseball pitcher. He has played in Major League Baseball (MLB) for the Houston Astros and Colorado Rockies.

== Professional career ==
López signed with the New York Yankees in 2002. He played in their minor league system until he was released in 2007. He signed with the San Diego Padres two days later.

In 2007, López played for the Fort Wayne Wizards and Lake Elsinore Storm, going 1–0 with a 3.30 ERA in 22 games for the former and 2–1 with a 6.10 ERA in 22 games for the latter. He played for the Storm, San Antonio Missions and Portland Beavers in 2008, going 2–1 with a 2.64 ERA in 30 games with the Storm, 0–2 with a 4.93 ERA in 27 games with the Missions, and 0–0 with a 9.00 ERA in one game with the Beavers.

=== Houston Astros ===
On April 10, 2009, López was selected off waivers by the Houston Astros from the Padres. López served as the team's closer in 2012 after Brett Myers was traded to the Chicago White Sox.

=== Colorado Rockies ===
On December 5, 2012, López and a player to be named later or cash from the Astros was traded to the Colorado Rockies in exchange for pitcher Alex White and minor league pitcher Alex Gillingham.

López was designated for assignment by Colorado on June 9, 2014. López was re-added to the team's roster on June 21. In October 2014, Lopez elected free agency.

=== Toronto Blue Jays ===
López signed a minor league contract with the Toronto Blue Jays on December 12, 2014. He was released by the Blue Jays organization on June 30, 2015.

In 2019 season, he was selected for Nicaragua national baseball team at the 2019 Pan American Games Qualifier.
