= Mike Barnett (baseball) =

American baseball coach (born 1959)

- Coach
- Born: February 1, 1959 (age 67); Columbus, Ohio, U.S.

Teams
- Toronto Blue Jays (2002–2005); Kansas City Royals (2006–2008); Houston Astros (2011–2012); Cleveland Indians / Guardians (2016–2023)

Michael Lee Barnett (born February 1, 1959) is an American former baseball coach. He most recently served as a coach in Major League Baseball (MLB) for the Cleveland Guardians and Houston Astros.

== Playing career ==
Barnett played catcher at Ohio University, but had his baseball career end following a shoulder injury.

== Coaching career ==
Barnett had a six-year stint as an assistant administrator of baseball operations for the New York Yankees from 1982 to 1987.

After leaving the Yankees, he spent two seasons on the coaching staff at the University of Tennessee from 1988 to 1989.

Following that, Barnett served as hitting coach at all levels of the Chicago White Sox organization from 1990 to 1997.

Barnett spent four seasons from 1998 to 2001 as hitting coach for Tucson (AAA) in the Arizona Diamondbacks organization.

Barnett served as hitting coach of the Toronto Blue Jays from 2002 to 2005, where he played a key role in the development of such hitters as Vernon Wells and Orlando Hudson. He helped lead the 2003 Blue Jays to an 86–76 record as the team ranked in the top 5 in the American League in numerous offensive categories including batting average (2nd), runs (2nd), hits (2nd) and home runs (5th).

After taking over as Royals' hitting coach May 1, 2006, Barnett led the Royals to a .275 (1,339–4,867) average the remainder of the season. The Royals hit a franchise-record 335 doubles in 2006, the 4th-highest total in the Majors.

On August 19, 2012, Barnett was released from the Houston Astros, along with manager Brad Mills and first base coach Bobby Meacham. The Astros' 39–82 record was the worst in the Major Leagues at the time.

Barnett was hired by the Cleveland Indians to serve as replay coordinator on January 14, 2016.

On October 31, 2023, the Guardians announced Barnett would not return to the major league coaching staff for the 2024 season.

== Personal ==
Barnett resides in Knoxville, Tennessee with his 2 children. He graduated from Ohio University with a degree in sports administration.
