= Bobby Meacham =

American baseball player (born 1960)

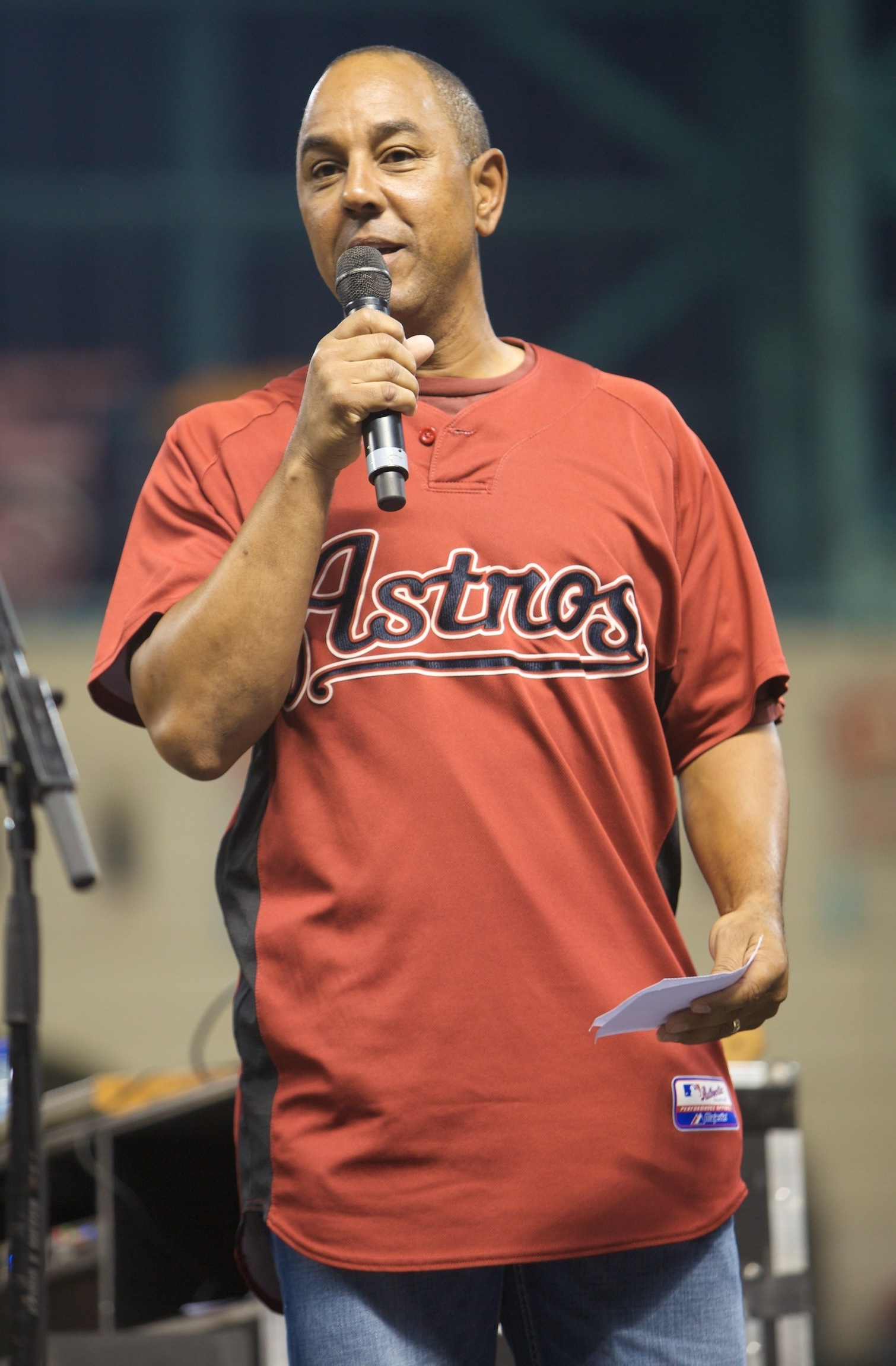
- Meacham in 2010.
- Shortstop
- Born: August 25, 1960 (age 65); Los Angeles, California, U.S.
- Batted: Switch Threw: Right

MLB debut
- June 30, 1983, for the New York Yankees

Last MLB appearance
- July 10, 1988, for the New York Yankees

MLB statistics
- Batting average: .237
- Home runs: 8
- Runs batted in: 114
- Stats at Baseball Reference

Teams
- As player: New York Yankees (1983–1988); As coach: Florida Marlins (2006); San Diego Padres (2007); New York Yankees (2008); Houston Astros (2009–2012); Philadelphia Phillies (2020–2022)

Robert Andrew Meacham (born August 25, 1960) is an American former professional baseball shortstop, who spent his entire six-year big league playing career with the New York Yankees of Major League Baseball (MLB). Since retiring from active play, Meacham has managed and coached for several organizations in the majors and minors.

== College career ==
=== San Diego State Aztecs ===
Meacham was drafted by the Chicago White Sox out of Mater Dei High School in Santa Ana, California, in the 14th round of the 1978 Major League Baseball draft, but chose, instead, to play college baseball at San Diego State University.

Meacham earned third team All-America accolades as a freshman, and was named San Diego State Aztecs team MVP in 1979. He was second team All-American in 1981 after batting .375 with seven home runs, 51 runs batted in (RBI) and 44 stolen bases, and was selected by the St. Louis Cardinals with the eighth overall pick in the 1981 Major League Baseball draft. Meacham signed with the Cardinals, ending his college career as SDSU's all-time leader in runs (214), hits (277), and at bats (767), and was second in career stolen bases (116), including a streak of thirty consecutive successful steals.

Baseball Hall of Fame member Tony Gwynn credited Meacham for helping him join the Aztecs baseball team, after coming to the school on a basketball scholarship. The two played against each other in high school and Meacham, knowing Gwynn's abilities well, encouraged Coach Jim Dietz to give him an opportunity.

== Professional playing career ==
=== St. Louis Cardinals ===
Meacham batted only .182 for the Gastonia Cardinals of the South Atlantic League in 1981. His batting average improved to .259 in 1982 with the Florida State League's St. Petersburg Cardinals, but his .915 fielding percentage and 47 errors was far worse than the organization that employed Ozzie Smith at short was accustomed to. On December 14, 1982, Meacham was traded to the New York Yankees with outfielder Stan Javier for pitchers Marty Mason and Steve Fincher and outfielder Bob Helsom in a minor league (MiLB) deal.

=== New York Yankees ===
The trade turned out to be a very good deal for the Yankees, as none of the three players the Yankees sent to the Cardinals ever reached the major leagues, and Javier was later included in the December 5, 1984 deal that brought them Rickey Henderson from the Oakland Athletics. Meacham, meanwhile, earned a major league promotion by June of his first season with his new club. He made his MLB debut on June 30, 1983, in the 12th inning of an extra-inning game against the Baltimore Orioles. The Yankees won on a Butch Wynegar walk off home run before Meacham could log his first major league plate appearance. That did not occur until his third major league game — against the Seattle Mariners, on September 3, 1983. He lined out to Mariners third baseman Manny Castillo. By the end of the season, Meacham had won the Yankees' starting shortstop job, appearing in a total of 22 games, while batting .235 in 51 at bats.

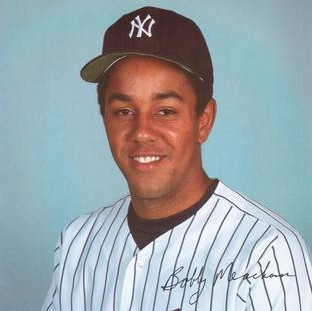
Meacham in 1984

During the off season, the Yankees acquired Tim Foli to play short in 1984. The Yankees ended up having something of a revolving door at shortstop, with Meacham, Foli, Roy Smalley, and Andre Robertson all seeing playing time at the position. Meacham emerged with the most playing time of the bunch, logging 840 innings and batting .253 with two home runs and 25 RBIs. Despite his limited role, Meacham led the American League (AL) with 14 sacrifice hits for the season. Meacham was the Yankees regular shortstop in 1985, playing in 156 out of 162 games. He hit just .218 in 1985 but led the major leagues with 23 sacrifice hits.

The most notable play of Meacham's career was a bizarre baserunning gaffe which also involved Dale Berra in an 11-inning 6–5 loss to the Chicago White Sox at Yankee Stadium, on August 2, 1985. With Meacham and Berra the runners at second and first base respectively in the seventh inning of a game tied at three, Rickey Henderson hit a ball that rolled to the farthest reaches of left-center field. When Meacham slipped between second and third base, both runners ended up approaching home plate in synchronized fashion, one on the heels of the other. After catching the relay throw from shortstop Ozzie Guillén, catcher Carlton Fisk tagged out Meacham to his right, then turned to his left just a split second later to do the same to Berra, completing the double play. Yankees manager Billy Martin commented, "I've never seen that in grammar school, much less a major-league game."

The Yankees were growing frustrated with Meacham's generally inconsistent play, and had acquired both Paul Zuvella and Wayne Tolleson in separate deals during the 1986 season to replace him at short. Meacham ended up splitting 1986 and 1987 between the Yankees and their Triple-A affiliate, the Columbus Clippers. He spent all of 1988 with the big league club, but injuries and the off season acquisition of Rafael Santana from the New York Mets limited Meacham to only 47 games, during which, he saw about half his playing time at second base.

Yankees team owner George Steinbrenner was particularly frustrated with Meacham's injuries and lackluster play and often lambasted him in the New York press. Following the 1988 season, Meacham was traded to the Texas Rangers for outfielder Bob Brower.

=== Rangers, Pirates, and Royals ===
Meacham failed to make the Rangers out of Spring training 1989, and was released by the club. He joined the Pittsburgh Pirates shortly afterward, spending all of the 1989 season with their Triple-A affiliate, the Buffalo Bisons, but never reaching the major league level. Meacham spent 1990 with the Omaha Royals, the farm team of the Kansas City Royals, again failing to make the big league club.

== Professional coaching career ==
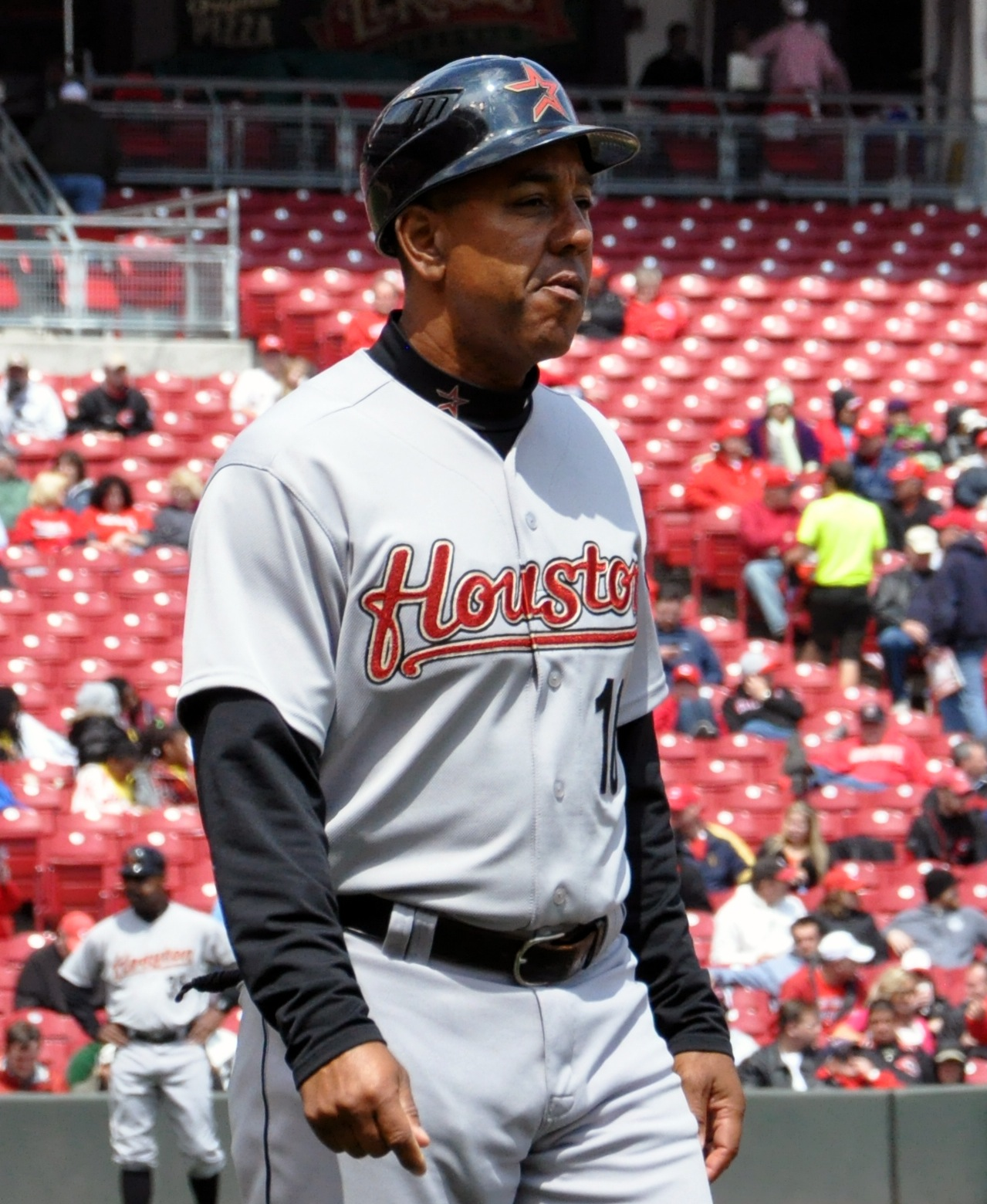
Meacham as Astros 1st base coach, 2011.

After retiring as an active player, Meacham began his coaching career in the Royals MiLB system. He proceeded to the Colorado Rockies organization, in 1993, and the Pirates farm system, from 1994 to 2001. Meacham was given his first managerial job in 2002 with the Rancho Cucamonga Quakes (Advanced A California League affiliate of the Anaheim Angels). He held that job through 2004, and returned to the Rockies organization in 2005 as their Minor League roving infield instructor. The following season, Meacham received his first major league coaching job, when new Florida Marlins manager Joe Girardi named him third base coach, in 2006.

Meacham was the San Diego Padres first base coach for the 2007 season, and rejoined Girardi as the Yankees' third base coach for 2008. On October 14, 2008, it was announced that Meacham's contract would not be renewed for the 2009 season. He spent 2009 with the Philadelphia Phillies organization, as the batting coach for the Williamsport Crosscutters. On October 30, 2009, Meacham was hired as the first base coach for the Houston Astros, under new manager Brad Mills.

On August 18, 2012, Meacham was released from the Astros, along with manager Brad Mills and hitting coach Mike Barnett.

Meacham was announced as the manager for the Dunedin Blue Jays on January 7, 2013.

On January 13, 2014, Meacham was named as the manager for the Toronto Blue Jays Double-A affiliate New Hampshire Fisher Cats.

On November 28, 2016, the Blue Jays promoted Meacham to manager of their Triple-A affiliate Buffalo Bisons. Meacham was fired on September 5, 2019.

In January, 2020, the Philadelphia Phillies announced that Meacham was being added to their coaching staff, serving as a coaching assistant to new Phillies manager, Joe Girardi. After a disappointing start to the 2022 season, Girardi and Meacham were both fired in mid-season.

As of 2023, Meacham is bench coach for the Triple-A Albuquerque Isotopes, affiliate of the Colorado Rockies.

Announced on January 31, 2024, Bobby became Manager of the Hartford Yard Goats, Double-A affiliate of the Colorado Rockies.

On February 3, 2026 the Hartford Yard Goats made an announcement that a new manager was hired for the 2026 season. It was later revealed that Meacham was promoted within the Rockies organization to Field Coordinator.

== Personal life ==
Meacham and his wife, Gari, have three children. His mother was born in Kingston, Jamaica. The Meachams gained notoriety in 1985 when Yankees manager Billy Martin and owner George Steinbrenner attempted to refuse to give Meacham a day off to witness the birth of his first child.

Sporting positions
Preceded by John Wockenfuss	Carolina Mudcats manager 1994	Succeeded by Trent Jewett
Preceded by Steve Smith	Calgary Cannons manager 1995	Succeeded by Trent Jewett
Preceded by Jeff Cox	Florida Marlins third base coach 2006	Succeeded by Bo Porter
Preceded by Tye Waller	San Diego Padres first base coach 2007	Succeeded by Rick Renteria
Preceded by Larry Bowa	New York Yankees third base coach 2008	Succeeded by Rob Thomson
Preceded by José Cruz	Houston Astros first base coach 2010–2012	Succeeded by Dan Radison
Preceded by Gary Allenson	New Hampshire Fisher Cats manager 2014–2016	Succeeded by Gary Allenson
Preceded by Gary Allenson	Buffalo Bisons manager 2017–2019	Succeeded by Ken Huckaby
