= 2011 Milwaukee Brewers season =

2011 Milwaukee Brewers
- National League Central champions
- League: National League
- Division: Central
- Ballpark: Miller Park
- City: Milwaukee, Wisconsin
- Record: 96–66 (.593)
- Divisional place: 1st
- Owners: Mark Attanasio
- General managers: Doug Melvin
- Managers: Ron Roenicke
- Television: WMLW-CA; Fox Sports Wisconsin (Brian Anderson, Bill Schroeder, Craig Coshun)
- Radio: AM 620 WTMJ (Bob Uecker, Cory Provus)
- Stats: ESPN.com; Baseball Reference

The Milwaukee Brewers' 2011 season was their 42nd season for the franchise in Milwaukee, the 14th in the National League, and 43rd overall. The Brewers posted a record of 96–66, the franchise's best until 2025. It led to their first-ever National League Central title, and their first division title since winning the AL East in 1982. The Brewers defeated the Arizona Diamondbacks in five games in the NLDS and advanced to the NLCS, where they lost in six games to the underdog division rival St. Louis Cardinals, who went on to win the World Series.

== 2010–11 offseason ==
Despite having arguably the best offense in the National League, the Brewers had struggled in 2010 due to lack of starting pitching as the Brewers had finished next-to-last in the league in team ERA. Vowing to the Brewer fans to get more starting pitching, GM Doug Melvin traded or released three of the team's most ineffective starters in Jeff Suppan, Dave Bush, and Doug Davis. The Brewers also tabbed John Axford as the Brewers new closer with the retirement of Trevor Hoffman.

In keeping with their vow of getting better starting pitching, the Brewers made a deal just hours into the Winter Meetings with the Toronto Blue Jays in acquiring starting pitcher Shaun Marcum in exchange for top prospect Brett Lawrie. The Brewers also were in the hunt for 2009 American League Cy Young Award winner Zack Greinke of the Kansas City Royals. On December 19, the Brewers reached a deal with the Royals. The Royals got Brewers' starting shortstop Alcides Escobar and prospects Lorenzo Cain, Jake Odorizzi, and Jeremy Jeffress in exchange for Greinke, shortstop Yuniesky Betancourt, and $2 million to cover the last year of Betancourt's contract. The arrival of Greinke created a wave of excitement in Milwaukee. In the first 72 hours after the trade had been announced, the Brewers sold 1,500 season tickets compared to only 800 sold in the previous two months, and sold almost 1.5 million individual tickets before Opening Day.

The Brewers also signed to the team veterans Takashi Saito and Mark Kotsay and made a last minute trade at the end of Spring training in sending Class-A prospect Cutter Dykstra to the Washington Nationals in exchange for outfielder Nyjer Morgan.

== Regular season ==
With the trades for Shaun Marcum and Zack Greinke, the Brewers were tabbed by many experts as favorites to not only win the NL Central Division, but also contenders for the National League pennant. The first month was a bumpy road for the Brewers as they were without Greinke due to a basketball-related rib injury during Spring training. The team opened the season with four consecutive losses. By the end of April, the Brewers had fallen to 5th place in the NL Central, but came back to have an impressive May, by taking advantage of the struggles of division rivals Cincinnati Reds and St. Louis Cardinals. The Brewers had problems offensively but were carried by the efforts of All-Stars Ryan Braun, Prince Fielder, and Rickie Weeks. Nyjer Morgan, who was acquired via trade on March 27 from the Washington Nationals, took over center field for struggling Carlos Gomez. Morgan became a fan favorite in Milwaukee because of his alter-ego and bizarre antics.

By the All-Star break, the Brewers were tied with St. Louis for the division lead despite having the National League's worst road record (16–29). The Brewers had NL's best home record at (33–14) which gave them a respectable 49–43 record at the midpoint of the 2011 season.

To address some needed bullpen help, the Brewers made another big trade just hours after the All-Star Game, trading two Class A prospects to the New York Mets in exchange for ace reliever Francisco Rodríguez, and also made another trade before the end of the trade deadline for veteran infielder Jerry Hairston Jr., who became essential to the Brewers' success after All-Star second baseman Rickie Weeks suffered a bad ankle sprain in the last week of July and Carlos Gomez was lost with a shoulder injury.

The Brewers started to overcome their road woes after the All-Star Break when they went on an 11-game road trip to Arizona, Colorado, and San Francisco. The Brewers ended up having a modest 5–6 mark on the road trip and came back to sweep the floundering Cubs and Astros and take two out of three games against the Cardinals to win eight of a nine-game homestand and take over 1st place in the NL Central. They followed the successful homestand with a sweep of the Astros in Houston; the first time they have swept the Astros away from Milwaukee, and also took 2 out of 3 games in St. Louis to extend the Brewers division lead to 7 games. The Brewers went on to have a stretch of 29 games from late July to mid August where they went 23–6 and finished the month of August with a 21–7 mark, setting a franchise record for most wins in one month.

The Brewers went through a series of scuffles in early September where their division lead, which had been up as high as 10 games in late August, went down to as few as 4.5 games as the Cardinals went on a sudden hot streak, becoming the first team to sweep the Brewers at Miller Park during the season. The Brewers, though, were able to keep their division lead steady, thanks to a mid-September sweep of the Reds.

On September 16, Ryan Braun hit his 30th home run of the season. Along with his 31 stolen bases, Braun became only the 2nd Brewer ever to have a 30-homer, 30-steal season, joining Tommy Harper, who accomplished the feat in 1970.

The Brewers came into their final 6 games with a 5-game lead over the Cardinals. On September 23, the Brewers beat the Florida Marlins 4–1, with Ryan Braun hitting a clutch 3-run homer in the 8th. In St. Louis, the Cardinals fell to the Cubs 5–1, giving the Brewers the NL Central Division title, their first division title since 1982. The Brewers also became the first franchise ever to win a division title in both the American and National leagues.

The night drew eerie echoes to the Brewers playoff year of 2008, as the Brewers that year needed to beat the Cubs and needed the Marlins to win to get into the playoffs, whereas it was vice versa in 2011, with the Brewers needing to beat the Marlins and for the Cubs to win to get into the playoffs. And like in 2008, Ryan Braun hit the clutch, game-winning home run for the Brewers.

On September 28, the final game of the season, the Brewers beat the Pirates 7–3, which was also their 96th win of the season, breaking the team record for wins in a season set in 1979 and tied in 1982. The Brewers finished the season 96–66, the second best record in the National League behind only the Philadelphia Phillies.

Along with their team accomplishments, the Brewers had many individual achievements from their players. Ryan Braun finished the season with 33 homers and 33 steals while finishing second in the National League in batting average, hitting .332 while Prince Fielder finished second in the league in both home runs and RBIs, hitting 38 home runs while driving in 120.

The Brewers starting pitching was also drastically better than 2010. Each of the Brewers 5 regular starters had 10-plus wins during the regular season. Yovani Gallardo won 17 games, the most by a Brewer since 2005, Zack Greinke won 16 games despite missing one month, both Shawn Marcum and Randy Wolf won 13 games, and number five starter Chris Narveson won 11 games. It was the first time since 1982 that the Brewers had five pitchers with 10 or more wins in a season. The Brewers also used fewer starting pitchers than any team in baseball, using only six starting pitchers, with Marco Estrada filling in for 7 games when Greinke and later Narveson were out with injuries.

The Brewers bullpen was also stellar, led by closer John Axford, who set two new club records with most consecutive converted saves (42) and most saves in a season (46).

The Brewers faced the Arizona Diamondbacks in the NLDS and won the first two games at Miller Park. The Brewers however got shelled by the Diamondbacks in games 3 and 4 in Arizona, and the series and season came down to Game 5 at Miller Park. The Brewers won the game in extra innings 3–2 to give the Brewers their first postseason series win since the 1982 ALCS.

The Brewers then faced their division rivals, the St. Louis Cardinals, in the NLCS, in a rematch of the 1982 World Series. The Brewers staged a come-from-behind victory, winning game one of the best-of-seven series by a score of 9–6. St. Louis however went on to pound the Brewers 12-3 in Game Two and scored 4 runs in the first inning of Game 3 to take the game, 4–3. The Brewers won Game 4 in St. Louis, however, they then lost the next two games to surrender the National League pennant to the Cardinals.

=== Season standings ===
==== National League Central ====
NL Central
Team	W	L	Pct.	GB	Home	Road
Milwaukee Brewers	96	66	.593	—	57‍–‍24	39‍–‍42
St. Louis Cardinals	90	72	.556	6	45‍–‍36	45‍–‍36
Cincinnati Reds	79	83	.488	17	42‍–‍39	37‍–‍44
Pittsburgh Pirates	72	90	.444	24	36‍–‍45	36‍–‍45
Chicago Cubs	71	91	.438	25	39‍–‍42	32‍–‍49
Houston Astros	56	106	.346	40	31‍–‍50	25‍–‍56

==== National League Wild Card ====
Division leaders
Team	W	L	Pct.
Philadelphia Phillies	102	60	.630
Milwaukee Brewers	96	66	.593
Arizona Diamondbacks	94	68	.580

Wild Card team (Top team qualifies for postseason)
Team	W	L	Pct.	GB
St. Louis Cardinals	90	72	.556	—
Atlanta Braves	89	73	.549	1
San Francisco Giants	86	76	.531	4
Los Angeles Dodgers	82	79	.509	7½
Washington Nationals	80	81	.497	9½
Cincinnati Reds	79	83	.488	11
New York Mets	77	85	.475	13
Colorado Rockies	73	89	.451	17
Florida Marlins	72	90	.444	18
Pittsburgh Pirates	72	90	.444	18
Chicago Cubs	71	91	.438	19
San Diego Padres	71	91	.438	19
Houston Astros	56	106	.346	34

=== Record vs. Opponents ===
2011 National League record Source: MLB Standings Grid – 2011
Team	AZ	ATL	CHC	CIN	COL	FLA	HOU	LAD	MIL	NYM	PHI	PIT	SD	SF	STL	WSH	AL
Arizona	–	2–3	3–4	4–2	13–5	5–2	6–1	10–8	4–3	3–3	3–3	3–3	11–7	9–9	3–4	5–3	10–8
Atlanta	3–2	–	4–3	3–3	6–2	12–6	5–1	2–5	5–3	9–9	6–12	4–2	4–5	6–1	1–5	9–9	10–5
Chicago	4–3	3–4	–	7–11	2–4	3–3	8–7	3–3	6–10	4–2	2–5	8–8	3–3	5–4	5–10	3–4	5–10
Cincinnati	2–4	3–3	11–7	–	3–4	3–3	9–6	4–2	8–8	2–5	1–7	5–10	4–2	5–2	9–6	4–2	6–12
Colorado	5–13	2–6	4–2	4–3	–	3–3	5–2	9–9	3–6	5–2	1–4	4–3	9–9	5–13	2–4	4–3	8–7
Florida	2–5	6–12	3–3	3–3	3–3	–	6–1	3–3	0–7	9–9	6–12	6–0	0–7	4–2	2–6	11–7	8–10
Houston	1–6	1–5	7–8	6–9	2–5	1–6	–	4–5	3–12	3–3	2–4	7–11	3–5	4–3	5–10	3–3	4–11
Los Angeles	8–10	5–2	3–3	2–4	9–9	3–3	5–4	–	2–4	2–5	1–5	6–2	13–5	9–9	4–3	4–2	6–9
Milwaukee	3–4	3–5	10–6	8–8	6–3	7–0	12–3	4–2	–	4–2	3–4	12–3	3–2	3–3	9–9	3–3	6–9
New York	3–3	9–9	2–4	5–2	2–5	9–9	3–3	5–2	2–4	–	7–11	4–4	4–3	2–4	3–3	8–10	9–9
Philadelphia	3–3	12–6	5–2	7–1	4–1	12–6	4–2	5–1	4–3	11–7	–	4–2	7–1	4–3	3–6	8–10	9–6
Pittsburgh	3–3	2–4	8–8	10–5	3–4	0–6	11–7	2–6	3–12	4–4	2–4	–	2–4	3–3	7–9	4–4	8–7
San Diego	7–11	5–4	3–3	2–4	9–9	7–0	5–3	5–13	2–3	3–4	1–7	4–2	–	6–12	3–3	3–4	6–9
San Francisco	9–9	1–6	4–5	2–5	13–5	2–4	3–4	9–9	3–3	4–2	3–4	3–3	12–6	–	5–2	3–4	10–5
St. Louis	4–3	5–1	10–5	6–9	4–2	6–2	10–5	3–4	9–9	3–3	6–3	9–7	3–3	2–5	–	2–4	8–7
Washington	3–5	9–9	4–3	2–4	3–4	7–11	3–3	2–4	3–3	10–8	10–8	4–4	4–3	4–3	4–2	–	8–7

== Playoffs ==
=== National League Division Series: Arizona Diamondbacks vs. Milwaukee Brewers ===
Milwaukee Brewers won the series, 3–2.

Game	Date	Score	Location	Time	Attendance
1	October 1	Arizona Diamondbacks – 1, Milwaukee Brewers – 4	Miller Park	2:44	44,122
2	October 2	Arizona Diamondbacks – 4, Milwaukee Brewers – 9	Miller Park	3:29	44,066
3	October 4	Milwaukee Brewers – 1, Arizona Diamondbacks – 8	Chase Field	3:01	48,312
4	October 5	Milwaukee Brewers – 6, Arizona Diamondbacks – 10	Chase Field	3:25	38,830
5	October 7	Arizona Diamondbacks – 2, Milwaukee Brewers – 3 (10 innings)	Miller Park	3:41	44,028

=== National League Championship Series: St. Louis Cardinals vs. Milwaukee Brewers ===
St. Louis won the series, 4–2.

Game	Date	Score	Location	Time	Attendance
1	October 9	St. Louis Cardinals – 6, Milwaukee Brewers – 9	Miller Park	3:35	43,613
2	October 10	St. Louis Cardinals – 12, Milwaukee Brewers – 3	Miller Park	3:36	43,937
3	October 12	Milwaukee Brewers – 3, St. Louis Cardinals – 4	Busch Stadium	3:10	43,584
4	October 13	Milwaukee Brewers – 4, St. Louis Cardinals – 2	Busch Stadium	3:25	45,606
5	October 14	Milwaukee Brewers – 1, St. Louis Cardinals – 7	Busch Stadium	3:09	46,904
6	October 16	St. Louis Cardinals – 12, Milwaukee Brewers – 6	Miller Park	3:43	43,926

== Game log ==
2011 game log
March/April (13–13) – home (8–5) – road (5–8)

#	Date	Opponent	Score	Win	Loss	Save	Attendance	Record
1	March 31	@ Reds	7–6	Ondrusek (1–0)	Axford (0–1)		42,398	0–1
2	April 2	@ Reds	4–2	Wood (1–0)	Marcum (0–1)	Cordero (1)	37,967	0–2
3	April 3	@ Reds	12–3	Arroyo (1–0)	Wolf (0–1)		24,805	0–3
4	April 4	Braves	2–1	Moylan (1–0)	Saito (0–1)	Kimbrel (1)	46,017	0–4
5	April 5	Braves	1–0	Gallardo (1–0)	Lowe (1–1)		24,117	1–4
6	April 6	Braves	5–4	Estrada (1–0)	Minor (0–1)	Axford (1)	23,420	2–4
7	April 7	Braves	4–2	Marcum (1–1)	Hanson (0–1)	Axford (2)	24,645	3–4
8	April 8	Cubs	7–4	Zambrano (1–0)	Wolf (0–2)	Mármol (3)	34,310	3–5
9	April 9	Cubs	6–0	Narveson (1–0)	Garza (0–1)		42,478	4–5
10	April 10	Cubs	6–5	Loe (1–0)	Wood (0–1)	Axford (3)	37,193	5–5
–	April 12	@ Pirates	Postponed (rain); Makeup: August 22					
11	April 13	@ Pirates	6–0	Marcum (2–1)	Correia (2–1)		8,755	6–5
12	April 14	@ Pirates	4–1	Wolf (1–2)	Maholm (0–2)		10,517	7–5
13	April 15	@ Nationals	4–3 (10)	Gaudin (1–1)	Braddock (0–1)		17,217	7–6
–	April 16	@ Nationals	Postponed (rain); Makeup: April 17					
14	April 17	@ Nationals	8–4	Marquis (1–0)	Gallardo (1–1)		n/a	7–7
15	April 17	@ Nationals	5–1	Hernández (2–1)	Loe (1–1)	Storen (1)	23,047	7–8
16	April 18	@ Phillies	6–3 (12)	Kintzler (1–0)	Kendrick (0–1)		45,637	8–8
17	April 19	@ Phillies	9–0	Wolf (2–2)	Halladay (2–1)		45,408	9–8
18	April 20	@ Phillies	4–3	Madson (2–0)	Kintzler (1–1)	Contreras (4)	45,743	9–9
19	April 22	Astros	14–7	Gallardo (2–1)	Figueroa (0–3)		31,907	10–9
20	April 23	Astros	9–6 (10)	Lyon (1–1)	Green (0–1)		37,065	10–10
21	April 24	Astros	4–1	Wolf (3–2)	Rodríguez (1–3)	Axford (4)	32,323	11–10
22	April 25	Reds	9–5	Arroyo (3–2)	Narveson (1–1)		35,794	11–11
23	April 26	Reds	3–2	Loe (2–1)	Ondrusek 2–2	Axford (5)	37,062	12–11
24	April 27	Reds	7–6 (10)	Chapman (2–0)	Mitre (0–1)	Cordero (4)	33,848	12–12
25	April 29	@ Astros	5–0	Marcum (3–1)	Myers (1–1)		25,734	13–12
26	April 30	@ Astros	2–1	Lyon (3–1)	Loe (2–2)		26,514	13–13

May (17–12) – home (13–2) – road (4–10)

#	Date	Opponent	Score	Win	Loss	Save	Attendance	Record
27	May 1	@ Astros	5–0	Norris (2–1)	Narveson (1–2)		23,908	13–14
28	May 2	@ Braves	6–2	Jurrjens (3–0)	Gallardo (2–2)		14,126	13–15
–	May 3	@ Braves	Postponed (rain); Makeup: May 4					
29	May 4	@ Braves	8–3	Hanson (4–3)	Estrada (1–1)		n/a	13–16
30	May 4	@ Braves	8–0	Hudson (4–2)	Greinke (0–1)		15,543	13–17
31	May 5	@ Braves	2–1	Venters (2–0)	Loe (2–3)	Kimbrel (7)	15,307	13–18
32	May 6	@ Cardinals	6–0	García (4–0)	Wolf (3–3)		35,552	13–19
33	May 7	@ Cardinals	4–0	Gallardo (3–2)	Lohse (4–2)		40,229	14–19
34	May 8	@ Cardinals	3–1	McClellan (5–0)	Narveson (1–3)	Salas (3)	40,125	14–20
35	May 9	Padres	4–3	Greinke (1–1)	Latos (0–5)	Axford (6)	27,058	15–20
36	May 10	Padres	8–6	Marcum (4–1)	Richard (1–4)	Axford (7)	22,861	16–20
37	May 11	Padres	13–6	Qualls (2–2)	Loe (2–4)		25,652	16–21
38	May 13	Pirates	5–2	Gallardo (4–2)	McDonald (2–3)	Axford (8)	32,837	17–21
39	May 14	Pirates	8–2	Narveson (2–3)	Karstens (2–2)		42,422	18–21
40	May 15	Pirates	9–6	Greinke (2–1)	Correia (5–4)		37,059	19–21
41	May 16	@ Dodgers	2–1	Marcum (5–1)	Garland (1–3)	Axford (9)	35,346	20–21
42	May 17	@ Dodgers	3–0	Kuroda (5–3)	Wolf (3–4)	Guerrier (1)	42,138	20–22
43	May 18	@ Padres	5–2	Gallardo (5–2)	Moseley (1–6)	Axford (10)	16,901	21–22
44	May 19	@ Padres	1–0	Bell (2–0)	Estrada (1–2)		16,286	21–23
45	May 20	Rockies	7–6 (14)	McClendon (1–0)	Paulino (0–4)		33,361	22–23
46	May 21	Rockies	3–2	Marcum (6–1)	Mortensen (1–1)	Axford (11)	42,240	23–23
47	May 22	Rockies	3–1	Wolf (4–4)	Jiménez (0–4)	Axford (12)	42,605	24–23
48	May 23	Nationals	11–3	Gallardo (6–2)	Gorzelanny (2–4)		22,906	25–23
49	May 24	Nationals	7–6	McClendon (2–0)	Rodríguez (1–1)	Axford (13)	24,722	26–23
50	May 25	Nationals	6–4	Greinke (3–1)	Marquis (5–2)	Loe (1)	34,419	27–23
51	May 27	Giants	5–4	Lincecum (5–4)	Marcum (6–2)	Wilson (14)	37,034	27–24
52	May 28	Giants	3–2	Axford (1–1)	Mota (2–2)		42,512	28–24
53	May 29	Giants	6–0	Gallardo (7–2)	Cain (3–4)		43,035	29–24
54	May 30	@ Reds	7–3	Wood (4–3)	Narveson (2–4)		21,564	29–25
55	May 31	@ Reds	7–2	Greinke (4–1)	Reineke (0–1)		14,294	30–25

June (14–13) – home (8–4) – road (6–9)

#	Date	Opponent	Score	Win	Loss	Save	Attendance	Record
56	June 1	@ Reds	4–3	Masset (1–3)	Loe (2–5)	Cordero (10)	22,213	30–26
57	June 3	@ Marlins	6–5	McClendon (3–0)	Núñez (0–2)	Axford (14)	15,315	31–26
58	June 4	@ Marlins	3–2	Gallardo (8–2)	Volstad (2–5)	Axford (15)	17,200	32–26
59	June 5	@ Marlins	6–5 (11)	Dillard (1–0)	Dunn (4–3)	Axford (16)	13,208	33–26
60	June 6	@ Marlins	7–2	Greinke (5–1)	Vázquez (3–5)		12,404	34–26
61	June 7	Mets	2–1	Capuano (4–6)	Estrada (1–3)	Rodríguez (17)	27,064	34–27
62	June 8	Mets	7–6	Axford (2–1)	Thayer (0–1)		26,114	35–27
63	June 9	Mets	4–1	Niese (5–5)	Gallardo (8–3)	Rodríguez (18)	30,632	35–28
64	June 10	Cardinals	8–0	Narveson (3–4)	Lohse (7–3)		33,240	36–28
65	June 11	Cardinals	5–3	Greinke (6–1)	Carpenter (1–6)	Axford (17)	41,930	37–28
66	June 12	Cardinals	4–3	Marcum (7–2)	Westbrook (6–4)	Axford (18)	42,692	38–28
67	June 13	@ Cubs	1–0	Samardzija (4–2)	Loe (2–6)	Mármol (13)	39,070	38–29
68	June 14	@ Cubs	5–4 (10)	Samardzija (5–2)	Dillard (1–1)		39,151	38–30
69	June 15	@ Cubs	9–5	Narveson (4–4)	Zambrano (5–4)		39,821	39–30
70	June 16	@ Cubs	12–7	Garza (3–6)	Greinke (6–2)		40,024	39–31
71	June 17	@ Red Sox	10–4	Lackey (5–5)	Estrada (1–4)		37,833	39–32
72	June 18	@ Red Sox	4–2	Wolf (5–4)	Lester (9–3)	Axford (19)	38,175	40–32
73	June 19	@ Red Sox	12–3	Wakefield (4–2)	Gallardo (8–4)		37,903	40–33
74	June 20	Rays	8–4	Niemann (2–4)	Narveson (4–5)		35,495	40–34
75	June 21	Rays	5–1	Greinke (7–2)	Hellickson (7–6)		40,079	41–34
76	June 22	Rays	6–3	Price (8–6)	Estrada (1–5)		39,632	41–35
77	June 24	Twins	4–3	Wolf (6–4)	Baker (5–5)	Axford (20)	39,819	42–35
78	June 25	Twins	11–1	Gallardo (9–4)	Liriano (4–7)		43,980	43–35
79	June 26	Twins	6–2	Narveson (5–5)	Pavano (5–6)		41,624	44–35
80	June 28	@ Yankees	12–2	García (7–6)	Greinke (7–3)		45,575	44–36
81	June 29	@ Yankees	5–2	Burnett (8–6)	Marcum (7–3)	Rivera (21)	46,450	44–37
82	June 30	@ Yankees	5–0	Sabathia (11–4)	Wolf (6–5)		46,903	44–38

July (16–11) – home (10–3) – road (6–8)

#	Date	Opponent	Score	Win	Loss	Save	Attendance	Record
83	July 1	@ Twins	6–2	Liriano (5–7)	Gallardo (9–5)		40,812	44–39
84	July 2	@ Twins	8–7	Saito (1–1)	Capps (2–4)	Axford (21)	41,378	45–39
85	July 3	@ Twins	9–7	Dumatrait (1–1)	Loe (2–7)	Perkins (1)	41,195	45–40
86	July 4	Diamondbacks	8–6	Demel (2–2)	Axford (2–2)	Hernandez (4)	41,622	45–41
87	July 5	Diamondbacks	7–3	Duke (2–3)	Wolf (6–6)	Hernandez (5)	34,014	45–42
88	July 6	Diamondbacks	3–1	Gallardo (10–5)	Paterson (0–2)	Axford (22)	36,470	46–42
89	July 7	Reds	5–4	Narveson (6–5)	Bailey (3–4)	Axford (23)	34,102	47–42
90	July 8	Reds	8–7	Estrada (2–5)	Cordero (3–2)		39,050	48–42
91	July 9	Reds	8–4 (10)	Bray (2–1)	Estrada (2–6)		43,119	48–43
92	July 10	Reds	4–3	Loe (3–7)	Cordero (3–3)		43,896	49–43
93	July 14	@ Rockies	12–3	Jiménez (5–8)	Gallardo (10–6)		41,088	49–44
94	July 15	@ Rockies	4–0	Nicasio (4–2)	Narveson (6–6)		35,044	49–45
95	July 16	@ Rockies	8–7	Rodríguez (3–2)	Street (0–3)	Axford (24)	46,783	50–45
96	July 17	@ Rockies	4–3	Marcum (8–3)	Cook (0–5)	Axford (25)	35,030	51–45
97	July 18	@ Diamondbacks	3–0	Collmenter (5–5)	Wolf (6–7)	Hernandez (9)	17,404	51–46
98	July 19	@ Diamondbacks	11–3	Gallardo (11–6)	Enright (1–4)		17,831	52–46
99	July 20	@ Diamondbacks	5–2 (10)	Saito (2–1)	Cook (0–1)	Axford (26)	19,196	53–46
100	July 21	@ Diamondbacks	4–0	Kennedy (11–3)	Greinke (7–4)		22,241	53–47
101	July 22	@ Giants	4–2	Marcum (9–3)	Cain (8–6)	Axford (27)	42,297	54–47
102	July 23	@ Giants	4–2	Vogelsong (8–1)	Wolf (6–8)	Wilson (30)	42,277	54–48
103	July 24	@ Giants	2–1	Bumgarner (6–9)	Gallardo (11–7)	Wilson (31)	42,262	54–49
104	July 26	Cubs	3–2	Narveson (7–6)	Dempster (7–8)	Axford (28)	39,183	55–49
105	July 27	Cubs	2–0	Greinke (8–4)	Zambrano (7–6)	Axford (29)	39,233	56–49
106	July 28	Cubs	4–2	Marcum (10–3)	Wells (2–4)	Axford (30)	40,008	57–49
107	July 29	Astros	4–0	Wolf (7–8)	Lyles (0–6)		41,672	58–49
108	July 30	Astros	6–2	Gallardo (12–7)	Happ (4–13)		44,306	59–49
109	July 31	Astros	5–4	Rodríguez (4–2)	Rodríguez (2–1)	Axford (31)	41,738	60–49

August (21–7) – home (11–4) – road (10–3)

#	Date	Opponent	Score	Win	Loss	Save	Attendance	Record
110	August 1	Cardinals	6–2	Greinke (9–4)	Carpenter (6–8)		41,619	61–49
111	August 2	Cardinals	8–7 (11)	McClellan (8–6)	Estrada (2–7)	Dotel (2)	39,393	61–50
112	August 3	Cardinals	10–5	Wolf (8–8)	Jackson (8–8)		41,906	62–50
113	August 5	@ Astros	8–1	Gallardo (13–7)	Happ (4–14)		25,811	63–50
114	August 6	@ Astros	7–5	Narveson (8–6)	Myers (3–12)	Axford (32)	30,561	64–50
115	August 7	@ Astros	7–3	Greinke (10–4)	Norris (5–8)		22,885	65–50
116	August 9	@ Cardinals	5–3 (10)	Hawkins (1–0)	Dotel (2–2)	Axford (33)	40,626	66–50
117	August 10	@ Cardinals	5–1	Wolf (9–8)	Westbrook (9–6)		38,397	67–50
118	August 11	@ Cardinals	5–2	Carpenter (8–8)	Gallardo (13–8)	Salas (22)	38,302	67–51
119	August 12	Pirates	7–2	Greinke (11–4)	Maholm (6–13)		41,820	68–51
120	August 13	Pirates	1–0	Estrada (3–7)	Correia (12–11)	Axford (34)	43,214	69–51
121	August 14	Pirates	2–1 (10)	Saito (3–1)	Resop (3–4)		45,103	70–51
122	August 15	Dodgers	3–0	Wolf (10–8)	Lilly (7–13)	Axford (35)	38,551	71–51
123	August 16	Dodgers	2–1	Saito (4–1)	Kuo (0–2)		37,083	72–51
124	August 17	Dodgers	3–1	Greinke (12–4)	Eovaldi (1–1)	Axford (36)	42,804	73–51
125	August 18	Dodgers	5–1	Kershaw (15–5)	Estrada (3–8)		42,873	73–52
126	August 19	@ Mets	6–1	Marcum (11–3)	Pelfrey (6–10)		24,470	74–52
127	August 20	@ Mets	11–9	Rodríguez (5–2)	Isringhausen (3–3)	Axford (37)	28,234	75–52
128	August 21	@ Mets	6–2	Gallardo (14–8)	Acosta (1–1)		25,949	76–52
129	August 22	@ Pirates	8–1	Narveson (9–6)	Karstens (9–7)		n/a	77–52
130	August 22	@ Pirates	9–2	McCutchen (4–3)	Greinke (12–5)		19,380	77–53
131	August 23	@ Pirates	11–4	Estrada (4–8)	Ohlendorf (0–1)		21,411	78–53
132	August 24	@ Pirates	2–0	Grilli (1–0)	Marcum (11–4)	Hanrahan (32)	18,013	78–54
133	August 26	Cubs	5–2	Wolf (11–8)	López (4–5)	Axford (38)	41,661	79–54
134	August 27	Cubs	6–4	Gallardo (15–8)	Dempster (10–10)	Axford (39)	44,091	80–54
135	August 28	Cubs	3–2	Greinke (13–5)	Coleman (2–7)	Axford (40)	41,883	81–54
136	August 30	Cardinals	2–1	Jackson (11–9)	Marcum (11–5)	Salas (23)	42,384	81–55
137	August 31	Cardinals	8–3	Westbrook (11–7)	Wolf (11–9)		38,073	81–56

September (15–10) – home (7–6) – road (8–4)

#	Date	Opponent	Score	Win	Loss	Save	Attendance	Record
138	September 1	Cardinals	8–4	Dotel (3–3)	Gallardo (15–9)		34,080	81–57
139	September 2	@ Astros	8–2	Greinke (14–5)	Rodríguez (1–6)		20,045	82–57
140	September 3	@ Astros	8–2	Narveson (10–6)	Norris (6–9)		24,982	83–57
141	September 4	@ Astros	4–0	Marcum (12–5)	Rodríguez (10–10)		21,976	84–57
142	September 5	@ Cardinals	4–1	Wolf (12–9)	Westbrook (11–8)	Axford (41)	42,043	85–57
143	September 6	@ Cardinals	4–2	Lohse (13–8)	Gallardo (15–10)	Motte (3)	35,397	85–58
144	September 7	@ Cardinals	2–0	Carpenter (9–9)	Greinke (14–6)		38,891	85–59
145	September 8	Phillies	7–2	Hamels (14–7)	Narveson (10–7)		41,646	85–60
146	September 9	Phillies	5–3	Halladay (17–5)	Marcum (12–6)	Madson (29)	43,283	85–61
147	September 10	Phillies	3–2 (10)	Stutes (6–1)	Hawkins (1–1)	Madson (30)	42,967	85–62
148	September 11	Phillies	3–2	Gallardo (16–10)	Worley (11–2)	Axford (42)	42,388	86–62
149	September 13	Rockies	2–1 (11)	Loe (4–7)	Lindstrom (2–2)		37,120	87–62
150	September 14	Rockies	6–2	Millwood (3–2)	Marcum (12–7)		38,302	87–63
151	September 16	@ Reds	6–3	Wolf (13–9)	Arroyo (8–12)	Axford (43)	32,506	88–63
152	September 17	@ Reds	10–1	Gallardo (17–10)	Vólquez (5–6)		39,766	89–63
153	September 18	@ Reds	8–1	Greinke (15–6)	Maloney (0–3)		37,845	90–63
154	September 19	@ Cubs	5–2	Coleman (3–8)	Narveson (10–8)		35,076	90–64
155	September 20	@ Cubs	5–1	Marcum (13–7)	Wells (7–5)		36,571	91–64
156	September 21	@ Cubs	7–1	Garza (9–10)	Wolf (13–10)		30,965	91–65
157	September 23	Marlins	4–1	Rodríguez (6–2)	Hensley (6–7)	Axford (44)	44,584	92–65
158	September 24	Marlins	6–4	Hawkins (2–1)	Badenhop (2–3)	Axford (45)	44,520	93–65
159	September 25	Marlins	9–5	Narveson (11–8)	Nolasco (10–12)		43,347	94–65
160	September 26	Pirates	9–8	McCutchen (5–3)	Saito (4–2)	Hanrahan (40)	41,222	94–66
161	September 27	Pirates	6–4	Hawkins (3–1)	Hughes (0–1)	Axford (46)	41,864	95–66
162	September 28	Pirates	7–3	Greinke (16–6)	Locke (0–3)		41,976	96–66

Brewers Win Brewers Loss Game Postponed

2011 postseason game log
National League Division Series Brewers 3-2

#	Date	Opponent	Score	Win	Loss	Save	Attendance	Record
1	October 1	Diamondbacks	4–1	Gallardo (1–0)	Kennedy (0–1)	Axford (1)	44,122	1–0
2	October 2	Diamondbacks	9–4	Saito (1–0)	Hudson (0–1)		44,066	2–0
3	October 4	@ Diamondbacks	8–1	Collmenter (1–0)	Marcum (0–1)		48,312	2–1
4	October 5	@ Diamondbacks	10–6	Owings (1–0)	Wolf (0–1)		38,830	2–2
5	October 7	Diamondbacks	3–2 (10)	Axford (1–0)	Putz (0–1)		44,028	3–2

National League Championship Series Cardinals 4-2

#	Date	Opponent	Score	Win	Loss	Save	Attendance	Record
1	October 9	Cardinals	9–6	Greinke (1–0)	García (0–1)	Axford (1)	43,613	1–0
2	October 10	Cardinals	12–3	Lynn (1–0)	Marcum (0–1)		43,937	1–1
3	October 12	@ Cardinals	4–3	Carpenter (1–0)	Gallardo (0–1)	Motte (1)	43,584	1–2
4	October 13	@ Cardinals	4–2	Wolf (1–0)	Lohse (0–1)	Axford (2)	45,606	2–2
5	October 14	@ Cardinals	7–1	Dotel (1–0)	Greinke (1–1)	Motte (2)	46,904	2–3
6	October 16	Cardinals	12–6	Rzepczynski (1–0)	Marcum (0–2)		43,926	2–4

== Roster ==
2011 Milwaukee Brewers
Roster
Pitchers: 59 John Axford; 21 Zach Braddock; 63 Frankie de la Cruz; 44 Mark DiFelice; 48 Tim Dillard; 41 Marco Estrada; 64 Mike Fiers; 49 Yovani Gallardo; 54 Sean Green; 13 Zack Greinke; 32 LaTroy Hawkins; 46 Danny Herrera; 61 Brandon Kintzler; 50 Kameron Loe; 18 Shaun Marcum; 58 Mike McClendon; 52 Sergio Mitre; 38 Chris Narveson; 57 Francisco Rodríguez; 40 Takashi Saito; 57 Mitch Stetter; 43 Randy Wolf	Catchers: 16 George Kottaras; 20 Jonathan Lucroy; 12 Martín Maldonado; 33 Wil Nieves; 11 Mike Rivera; Infielders: 3 Yuniesky Betancourt; 30 Craig Counsell; 28 Prince Fielder; 24 Mat Gamel; 5 Taylor Green; 15 Jerry Hairston Jr.; 7 Felipe López; 14 Casey McGehee; 23 Rickie Weeks; 9 Josh Wilson	Outfielders: 22 Erick Almonte; 12 Brandon Boggs; 8 Ryan Braun; 15 Brett Carroll; 27 Carlos Gómez; 1 Corey Hart; 25 Mark Kotsay; 2 Nyjer Morgan; 22 Logan Schafer; Other batters: 33 Eric Farris; 7 Jeremy Reed	Manager: 10 Ron Roenicke; Coaches: 55 Marcus Hanel (bullpen catcher); 35 Garth Iorg (first base); 39 Rick Kranitz (pitching); 53 Stan Kyles (bullpen); 36 Jerry Narron (bench); 6 Ed Sedar (third base); 29 Dale Sveum (hitting)

== Transactions ==
- 12/06 – Traded IF Brett Lawrie to Toronto Blue Jays for RHP Shaun Marcum.
- 12/19 – Traded SS Alcides Escobar, OF Lorenzo Cain, RHP Jeremy Jeffress and RHPJake Odorizzi to Kansas City Royals for RHP Zack Greinke, SS Yuniesky Betancourt and 2 million dollars.
- 03/25 – Traded CF Chris Dickerson to New York Yankees for RHP Sergio Mitre.
- 03/27 – Traded IF Cutter Dykstra to Washington Nationals for CF Nyjer Morgan.
- 04/06 – Optioned RHP Brandon Kintzler to Nashville Sounds. <-> Called up RHP Marco Estrada from Nashville Sounds.
- 04/11 – Designated OF Jeremy Reed for assignment. <-> Activated C Jonathan Lucroy from the 15-Day disabled list.
- 04/11 – Placed RHP Takashi Saito on the 15-Day disabled list retroactive April 5, 2011. Left hamstring strain. <-> Called up RHP Brandon Kintzler from Nashville Sounds.
- 04/13 – Outrighted OF Jeremy Reed to Nashville Sounds.
- 04/19 – Placed RHP Shaun Marcum on the bereavement leave list. <-> Called up RHP Mike McClendon from Nashville Sounds.
- 04/21 – Optioned RHP Mike McClendon to Nashville Sounds. <-> Activated RHP LaTroy Hawkins from the 15-Day disabled list.
- 04/21 – Placed CF Nyjer Morgan on the 15-Day disabled list retroactive April 18, 2011. Deep thigh bruise.
- 04/21 – Outrighted C George Kottaras to Nashville Sounds.
- 04/22 – Activated RHP Shaun Marcum from the bereavement leave list.
- 04/22 – Called up OF Brandon Boggs from Nashville Sounds.
- 04/26 – Placed IF Erick Almonte on the 7-Day disabled list. Concussion. <-> Activated RF Corey Hart from the 15-Day disabled list.
- 05/03 – Placed LHP Zach Braddock on the 15-Day disabled list. Sleep disorder. <-> Activated CF Nyjer Morgan from the 15-Day disabled list.
- 05/04 – Outrighted OF Brandon Boggs to Nashville Sounds. <-> Activated RHP Zack Greinke from the 15-Day disabled list.
- 05/05 – Optioned RHP Sean Green to Nashville Sounds. <-> Called up RHP Mike McClendon from Nashville Sounds.
- 05/06 – Placed CF Nyjer Morgan on the 15-Day disabled list. Broken middle finger on left hand. <-> Called up OF Brandon Boggs from Nashville Sounds.
- 05/10 – Placed IF Erick Almonte on the 15-Day disabled list.
- 05/14 – Placed RHP Brandon Kintzler on the 15-Day disabled list retroactive to May 5, 2011. Right triceps tendonitis. <-> Called up RHP Tim Dillard from Nashville Sounds.
- 05/17 – Placed LHP Mitch Stetter on the 15-Day disabled list retroactive May 15, 2011. Left hip injury. <-> Called up C Mike Rivera from Nashville Sounds.
- 05/17 – Designated RHP Sean Green for assignment.
- 05/19 – Outrighted RHP Sean Green to Nashville Sounds.
- 05/23 – Claimed LHP Daniel Ray Herrera off waivers from Cincinnati Reds.
- 05/23 – Optioned LHP Daniel Ray Herrera to Nashville Sounds.
- 05/23 – Transferred LHP Manny Parra from the 15-Day disabled list to the 60-Day disabled list.
- 05/25 – Claimed SS Josh Wilson off waivers from Arizona Diamondbacks.
- 05/25 – Optioned SS Josh Wilson to Nashville Sounds.
- 05/25 – Transferred RHP Takashi Saito from the 15-Day disabled list to the 60-Day disabled list.
- 05/26 – Outrighted OF Brandon Boggs to Nashville Sounds.
- 05/27 – Activated CF Nyjer Morgan from the 15-Day disabled list.
- 05/27 – Outrighted C Mike Rivera to Nashville Sounds. <-> Called up SS Josh Wilson from Nashville Sounds.
- 06/03 – Outrighted IF Erick Almonte to Nashville Sounds.
- 06/04 – Optioned RHP Mike McClendon to Nashville Sounds. <-> Activated LHP Zach Braddock from the 15-Day disabled list.
- 06/15 – Outrighted C Wil Nieves to Nashville Sounds. <-> Called up C George Kottaras from Nashville Sounds.
- 06/16 – Optioned LHP Zach Braddock to Nashville Sounds. <-> Called up LHP Daniel Ray Herrera from Nashville Sounds.
- 06/18 – Designated LHP Daniel Ray Herrera for assignment. <-> Called up RHP Mark DiFelice from Nashville Sounds.
- 06/27 – Optioned RHP Mark DiFelice to Nashville Sounds. <-> Called up IF Mat Gamel from Nashville Sounds.
- 06/27 – Designated RHP Sergio Mitre for assignment. <-> Called up LHP Zach Braddock from Nashville Sounds.
- 06/27 – Outrighted Justin James to Nashville Sounds.
- 06/30 – Traded RHP Sergio Mitre to New York Yankees for cash considerations.
- 07/02 – Optioned RHP Tim Dillard to Nashville Sounds. <-> Activated RHP Takashi Saito from the 60-Day disabled list.
- 07/10 – Optioned IF Mat Gamel to Nashville Sounds <-> Called up RHP Cody Scarpetta from Huntsville Stars.
- 07/11 – Optioned RHP Cody Scarpetta to Huntsville Stars.
- 07/13 – Traded cash considerations and 2 PTBNL to New York Mets for RHP Francisco Rodríguez.
- 07/16 – Optioned LHP Zach Braddock to Nashville Sounds. <-> Called up RHP Tim Dillard from Nashville Sounds
- 07/21 – Placed CF Carlos Gómez on the 15-Day disabled list. Fractured left clavicle. <-> Called up OF Brett Carroll from Nashville Sounds.
- 07/27 – Traded C Wil Nieves to Atlanta Braves for cash considerations.
- 07/28 – Placed 2B Rickie Weeks on the 15-Day disabled list. Sprained left ankle. <-> Called up 2B Eric Farris from Nashville Sounds.
- 07/28 – Traded cash considerations to Tampa Bay Rays for 2B Felipe López.
- 07/28 – Optioned 2B Felipe López to Nashville Sounds.
- 07/29 – Optioned 2B Eric Farris to Nashville Sounds. <-> Called up 2B Felipe López from Nashville Sounds.
- 07/30 – Designated OF Brett Carroll for assignment. <-> Traded OF Erik Komatsu to Washington Nationals for IF/OF Jerry Hairston Jr.
- 07/30 – Transferred LHP Mitch Stetter from the 15-Day disabled list to the 60-Day disabled list.
- 08/03 – OF Brett Carroll elected for free agency.
- 08/10 – Placed LHP Chris Narveson on the 15-Day disabled list retroactive to August 7, 2011. Left thumb laceration. <-> Called up RHP Frankie de la Cruz from Nashville Sounds.
- 08/22 – Designated 2B Felipe López for assignment. <-> Activated LHP Chris Narveson from the 15-Day disabled list.
- 08/27 – Optioned RHP Tim Dillard to Nashville Sounds. <-> Called up 3B Taylor Green from Nashville Sounds.

== Player stats ==
(through September 28, 2011)

=== Batting ===
Note: G = Games played; AB = At bats; R = Runs scored; H = Hits; 2B = Doubles; 3B = Triples; HR = Home runs; RBI = Runs batted in; TB = Total bases; BB = Walks; SO = Strikeouts; SB = Stolen bases; CS = Caught stealing; BA = Batting average; OBP = On-base percentage; SLG = Slugging percentage; OPS = On-base percentage plus slugging

Player	GP	AB	R	H	2B	3B	HR	RBI	TB	BB	SO	SB	CS	BA	OBP	SLG	OPS
Francisco Rodríguez	14	1	0	1	0	0	0	0	1	0	0	0	0	1.000	1.000	1.000	2.000
Mike Rivera	1	6	0	2	0	0	0	0	2	0	1	0	0	.333	.333	.333	.667
Ryan Braun	150	563	109	187	38	6	33	111	336	58	93	33	6	.332	.397	.597	.994
Nyjer Morgan	119	378	61	115	20	6	4	37	159	19	70	13	4	.304	.357	.421	.778
Prince Fielder	162	569	95	170	36	1	38	120	322	107	106	1	1	.299	.415	.566	.981
Jonathan Lucroy	136	430	45	114	16	1	12	59	168	29	99	2	1	.265	.313	.391	.703
Marco Estrada	40	12	1	3	1	0	0	0	4	0	5	0	0	.250	.250	.333	.583
Rickie Weeks	118	453	77	122	26	2	20	49	212	50	107	9	2	.269	.350	.468	.818
Corey Hart	130	492	80	140	25	4	26	63	251	51	114	7	6	.285	.356	.510	.866
Josh Wilson	54	75	10	17	4	0	2	4	27	4	21	1	0	.227	.266	.360	.626
Yuniesky Betancourt	152	556	51	140	27	3	13	68	212	16	63	4	4	.252	.271	.381	.652
Mark Kotsay	104	238	18	63	13	1	3	31	87	21	27	3	0	.270	.329	.373	.703
Casey McGehee	155	546	46	122	24	2	13	67	189	45	104	0	3	.223	.280	.346	.626
George Kottaras	49	111	15	28	6	1	5	17	51	10	26	0	1	.252	.311	.459	.771
Jerry Hairston Jr.	45	124	18	34	10	0	1	7	47	11	16	1	0	.274	.348	.379	.727
Yovani Gallardo	26	54	9	12	3	0	1	4	18	3	19	0	0	.222	.263	.333	.596
Carlos Gómez	81	209	31	46	9	3	6	18	79	14	61	15	1	.220	.270	.378	.648
Zack Greinke	21	32	5	6	0	0	1	1	9	2	5	0	0	.188	.235	.281	.517
Felipe López	15	43	4	8	0	0	0	3	8	4	6	0	0	.186	.250	.186	.436
Randy Wolf	25	44	2	8	3	0	0	0	11	0	19	0	0	.182	.182	.250	.432
Brandon Boggs	16	19	4	3	0	0	2	2	9	3	8	1	0	.158	.273	.474	.746
Shaun Marcum	25	45	2	7	1	0	1	6	11	2	14	0	0	.156	.191	.244	.436
Craig Counsell	84	126	13	19	2	1	0	4	23	16	19	2	1	.151	.255	.183	.438
Chris Narveson	23	42	2	6	2	0	0	2	8	2	15	0	0	.143	.182	.190	.372
Wil Nieves	20	50	2	7	2	0	0	0	9	3	12	0	0	.140	.189	.180	.369
Mat Gamel	10	26	1	3	1	0	0	2	4	1	4	0	0	.115	.148	.154	.302
Erick Almonte	16	29	1	3	0	0	1	3	6	0	4	0	0	.103	.103	.207	.310
Jeremy Reed	7	7	0	0	0	0	0	0	0	0	2	0	0	.000	.000	.000	.000
Brett Carroll	2	3	0	0	0	0	0	0	0	0	1	0	0	.000	.000	.000	.000
Sergio Mitre	22	2	0	0	0	0	0	0	0	0	0	0	0	.000	.000	.000	.000
Eric Farris	1	1	0	0	0	0	0	0	0	0	0	0	0	.000	.000	.000	.000
Brandon Kintzler	9	1	0	0	0	0	0	0	0	0	1	0	0	.000	.000	.000	.000
Team totals	162	5447	721	1422	276	31	185	693	2315	481	1083	94	31	.261	.325	.425	.750

=== Pitching ===
(through September 28, 2011)

Note: G = Games pitched; GS = Games started; W = Wins; L = Losses; SV = Saves; QS = Quality starts; HLD = Holds; IP = Innings pitched; H = Hits allowed; ER = Earned runs allowed; HR = Home runs allowed; BB = Walks allowed; SO = Strikeouts; K/9 = Strikeouts per 9 innings pitched; P/GS = Pitches per game started; WHIP = Walks plus hits per inning pitched; ERA = Earned run average

Player	GP	GS	W	L	SV	QS	HLD	IP	H	ER	HR	BB	SO	K/9	P/GS	WHIP	ERA
Michael Fiers	2	0	0	0	0	0	0	2.0	2	0	0	3	2	9.00	0.0	2.50	0.00
Takashi Saito	30	0	4	2	0	0	10	26.2	21	6	2	9	23	7.8	0.0	1.13	2.03
John Axford	74	0	2	2	46	0	0	73.2	59	16	4	25	86	10.5	0.0	1.14	1.95
Francisco Rodríguez	31	0	4	0	0	0	17	29.0	23	6	1	10	33	10.2	0.0	1.14	1.86
Frankie de la Cruz	11	0	0	0	0	0	0	13.0	10	4	0	5	9	5.4	0.0	1.15	2.77
LaTroy Hawkins	52	0	3	1	0	0	20	48.1	50	13	1	10	28	5.2	0.0	1.24	2.42
Mike McClendon	9	0	3	0	0	0	0	13.2	15	4	1	3	10	6.6	0.0	1.32	2.63
Sergio Mitre	22	0	0	1	0	0	1	33.0	30	12	3	10	14	3.8	0.0	1.21	3.27
Kameron Loe	72	0	4	7	1	0	16	72.0	65	28	4	16	61	7.6	0.0	1.13	3.38
Shaun Marcum	33	33	13	7	0	20	0	200.2	175	79	22	57	158	7.1	96.4	1.16	3.54
Randy Wolf	33	33	13	10	0	21	0	212.1	214	87	23	66	134	5.7	102.3	1.32	3.69
Yovani Gallardo	33	33	17	10	0	21	0	207.1	193	81	27	59	207	9.0	104.9	1.22	3.52
Brandon Kintzler	9	0	1	1	0	0	0	14.2	14	6	3	3	15	9.20	0.0	1.16	3.68
Zack Greinke	28	28	16	6	0	19	0	171.2	161	73	19	45	201	10.50	101.4	1.20	3.83
Marco Estrada	43	7	4	8	0	3	4	92.2	83	42	11	29	88	8.5	93.6	1.21	4.08
Chris Narveson	30	28	11	8	0	12	0	161.1	160	80	17	65	126	7.0	92.9	1.39	4.45
Tim Dillard	24	0	1	1	0	0	1	28.2	26	13	3	4	27	8.5	0.0	1.05	4.08
Mitch Stetter	16	0	0	0	0	0	1	7.0	8	4	2	1	7	9.00	0.0	1.29	5.14
Sean Green	14	0	0	1	0	0	1	11.2	14	7	0	6	7	5.40	0.0	1.71	5.40
Zach Braddock	25	0	0	1	0	0	3	17.1	16	14	2	11	18	9.3	0.0	1.56	7.27
Mark DiFelice	3	0	0	0	0	0	0	3.0	3	4	1	2	3	9.00	0.0	1.67	12.00
Daniel Ray Herrera	2	0	0	0	0	0	0	1.2	6	4	1	1	0	0.00	0.0	4.20	21.60
Team totals	162	162	96	66	47	96	74	1441.2	1348	638	582	480	1257	7.85	—	1.24	3.63

== Farm system ==
The Brewers' farm system consisted of seven minor league affiliates in 2011.

Level	Team	League	Manager
Triple-A	Nashville Sounds	Pacific Coast League	Don Money
Double-A	Huntsville Stars	Southern League	Mike Guerrero
Class A-Advanced	Brevard County Manatees	Florida State League	Jeff Isom
Class A	Wisconsin Timber Rattlers	Midwest League	Matt Erickson
Rookie	Helena Brewers	Pioneer League	Joe Ayrault
Rookie	AZL Brewers	Arizona League	Tony Diggs
Rookie	DSL Brewers	Dominican Summer League	Néstor Corredor
