= List of people from Arlington, Texas =

This is a list of notable past and present residents of the U.S. city of Arlington, Texas, and its surrounding metropolitan area. For a list of people whose only connection to Arlington is from the University of Texas, see: List of University of Texas at Arlington people.

== Athletics ==
- Ed Appleton - Major League Baseball pitcher, played for the Brooklyn Robins
- Aldrich Bailey - sprinter
- Reggie Barnes - professional football player
- Ronnie Coleman - 8-time Mr. Olympia bodybuilding champion
- Ryan Considine - professional football player
- Scott Cross - college basketball coach
- Cade Cunningham - professional basketball player
- Chris Davis - professional baseball player
- Kyler Edwards - basketball guard in the Israeli Basketball Premier League
- Moses Ehambe - professional basketball player
- Aaron Fairooz - professional football player
- Myles Garrett - professional football player
- Vickie Gates - bodybuilder
- Jaime Gomez - professional golfer
- Johan Gomez - professional soccer player
- Reggie Harrell - professional football player
- Jeff Horton - football coach
- Kenny Iwebema - professional football player
- Bobby Iwuchukwu - professional football player
- Fred Jackson - professional football player
- Luke Joeckel - professional football player
- Kyron Johnson - professional football player
- Seth Jones - professional hockey player
- Jaynie Krick - professional baseball player (AAGPBL)
- Sean Lowe - professional baseball pitcher
- Chris Martin - professional baseball pitcher
- Angela Maxwell - figure skater
- Mike McClendon - professional baseball pitcher
- Jim McElreath - professional racecar driver
- Scott McGarrahan - professional football player
- Craig Monroe - professional baseball player
- Emmanuel Mudiay - professional basketball player
- Ty Nsekhe - professional football player
- Chris Odom - professional football player
- Betty Pariso - IFBB professional bodybuilder
- Hunter Pence - professional baseball player
- Lenzy Pipkins - professional football player
- Quinn Sharp - professional football player
- Lee Shepherd - professional racecar driver
- Tommy Spinks - professional football player
- Lane Taylor - professional football player
- Stepfan Taylor - professional football player
- Rich Thompson - professional baseball pitcher
- Todd Van Poppel - professional baseball pitcher
- Frank Vecera - paralympic athlete, snooker and wheelchair basketball player
- Val Joe Walker - professional football player
- Jeremy Wariner - track athlete
- Mitch Willis - professional football player
- Brandon Workman - professional baseball pitcher
- Myles Adams - professional football player

== Business ==
- Blake Mycoskie - entrepreneur, author, and philanthropist
- David A. Sampson - CEO of the Property Casualty Insurers Association of America

== Literature ==
- Elizabeth Bruenig - journalist and author

== Movies, television, and media ==
- Judith Barrett - actress
- Corinne Bohrer - actress
- Mark Britten - comedian
- Taylor Cole - actress
- Corby Davidson - radio personality
- James Duff - screenwriter
- Will Ganss - broadcast journalist
- Todd Haberkorn - actor
- Todrick Hall - performer, singer
- iLikeHaskell - content creator
- Kristi Kang - voice actress
- Lauren Lane - actress
- Billy Miller - actor
- Jonathan Murphy - actor
- Jason Nguyen - live streamer JasonTheWeen
- Stacey Oristano - actress
- Hayley Orrantia - actress, singer and songwriter
- Madison Pettis - actress
- Ben Rappaport - actor
- Chris Sheffield - actor
- Jennifer Stone - actress
- Emily Warfield - actress

== Music ==
- Dimebag Darrell - musician, founding member of Pantera and Damageplan
- Mitch Grassi - singer, founding member of Pentatonix and Superfruit
- Mickey Guyton - country singer
- Cas Haley - musician/singer
- Scott Hoying - singer, founding member of Pentatonix and Superfruit
- Melissa Lawson - country singer
- Kirstin Maldonado - singer, founding member of Pentatonix
- Brandon Moore - composer
- Maren Morris - country singer
- Mr.Kitty - singer/songwriter, producer, DJ
- Natasha Owens - Christian musician known for viral song "Trump Won"
- Vinnie Paul - musician, founding member of Pantera, Damageplan and Hellyeah
- Lacey Sturm - singer-songwriter
- Tay-K - singer/songwriter, rapper, convicted murderer
- B.J. Thomas - musician/singer

== Politics ==
- Leo Berman - former member, Texas House of Representatives, from Smith County; former Arlington resident
- Robert Cluck - former mayor of Arlington
- Les Eaves - Republican member of the Arkansas House of Representatives; former Arlington resident
- Chris Harris - member, both houses of the Texas legislature
- Shannon McGauley - co-founder, Texas Minutemen
- Diane Patrick - member, Texas House of Representatives, 2007–2015
- Mark M. Shelton - former member, Texas House of Representatives
- SJ Stovall - mayor of Arlington
- Tony Tinderholt - District 94 state representative
- Tom Vandergriff - member, U.S. House of Representatives, former mayor of Arlington
- Bill Zedler - member, Texas House of Representatives

== Miscellaneous ==
- Lester Bower - convicted quadruple murderer executed in 2015
- Joe Exotic - zoo operator and convicted felon
- Amber Hagerman - kidnapping and murder victim and namesake of the "Amber Alert"
- Terry Hornbuckle - criminal
- David Williams - professional poker player
