= Parker Mushinski =

American baseball player (born 1995)

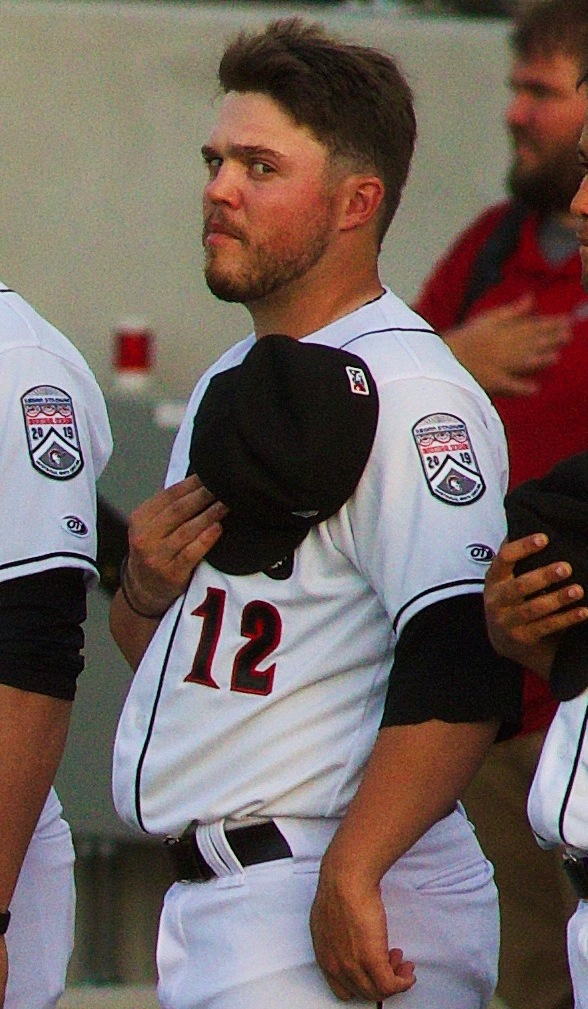
- Mushinski with the Fayetteville Woodpeckers in 2019

Free agent
- Pitcher
- Born: November 22, 1995 (age 30); Arlington, Texas, U.S.
- Bats: Left Throws: Left

MLB debut
- April 17, 2022, for the Houston Astros

MLB statistics (through 2026 season)
- Win–loss record: 1–0
- Earned run average: 4.99
- Strikeouts: 26
- Stats at Baseball Reference

Teams
- Houston Astros (2022–2024); Colorado Rockies (2026)

Parker Allen Mushinski (born November 22, 1995) is an American professional baseball pitcher who is a free agent. He has previously played in Major League Baseball (MLB) for the Houston Astros and Colorado Rockies. He played college baseball for the Texas Tech Red Raiders.

== Amateur career ==
Mushinski attended Argyle High School in Argyle, Texas. As a senior in 2014, Mushinski posted a 2.10 ERA with 98 strikeouts over 51 innings. Undrafted out of high school, Mushinski attended Texas Tech University over three seasons (2015-2017) to play college baseball for the Red Raiders. As a junior, he posted a 3–2 record with a 2.15 ERA and 47 strikeouts over 37 2/3 innings. He was drafted by the Houston Astros in the 7th round of the 2017 MLB draft and signed with them.

== Professional career ==
=== Houston Astros ===
Mushinski spent his professional debut season of 2017 with the Low–A Tri-City ValleyCats, going 3–1 with a 3.60 ERA and 40 strikeouts over 30 innings. He spent the 2018 season with the Single–A Quad Cities River Bandits, going 4–2 with a 2.33 ERA and 114 strikeouts over 89 innings. Mushinski split the 2019 season between the rookie–level Gulf Coast League Astros, High–A Fayetteville Woodpeckers and Double–A Corpus Christi Hooks, going a combined 0–2 with a 4.35 ERA and 74 strikeouts over 62 innings. He did not play in a game in 2020 due to the cancellation of the minor league season because of the COVID-19 pandemic. Mushinski posted a 2.84 ERA with 18 strikeouts over 12 2/3 innings for the Triple–A Sugar Land Skeeters in 2021. He opened the 2022 season with the Sugar Land Space Cowboys.

On April 16, 2022, Houston selected Mushinski's contract and promoted him to the active roster. Due to left elbow discomfort, the Astros placed Mushinski on the 15-day IL on June 7 and recalled Brandon Bielak from Sugar Land to replace him on the roster. Mushunski was activated July 2022. He appeared in seven total games with Houston in 2022, allowing a 3.86 ERA.

Mushinski missed the start of the 2023 season due to lumbar muscles spasms. On May 22, 2023, the Astros activated him from the 10-day injured list. In 14 outings for Houston, he recorded a 5.52 ERA with 15 strikeouts across 14 2/3 innings pitched.

Mushinski made 10 appearances for Houston in 2024, struggling to a 6.55 ERA with 3 strikeouts over 11 innings pitched. Mushinski was designated for assignment by the Astros on September 6, 2024. He cleared waivers and was sent outright to Sugar Land on September 9. Mushinski elected free agency following the season on November 4.

=== Cleveland Guardians ===
On November 9, 2024, Mushinski signed a minor league contract with the Cleveland Guardians that included an invitation to spring training. He made 46 appearances for the Triple-A Columbus Clippers in 2025, registering a 6-5 record and 3.78 ERA with 66 strikeouts and seven saves over 50 innings of work. Mushinski elected free agency following the season on November 6, 2025.

=== Colorado Rockies ===
On November 21, 2025, Mushinski signed a minor league contract with the Colorado Rockies that included an invitation to spring training. On March 22, 2026, Mushinski triggered the opt-out clause in his contract; however, two days later, he re-signed with Colorado on a minor league contract. He had his contract selected to the major league roster on August 4. He pitched in eight games for Colorado and allowed two runs on nine hits across 6 2/3 innings. On August 19, he was designated for assignment by the Rockies. He cleared waivers and was sent outright to the Triple–A Albuquerque Isotopes on August 22. He elected free agency on September 29.

== See also ==
- List of people from Arlington, Texas
- List of sportspeople educated at Texas Tech University
