= Wil Nieves =

Puerto Rican baseball player (born 1977)

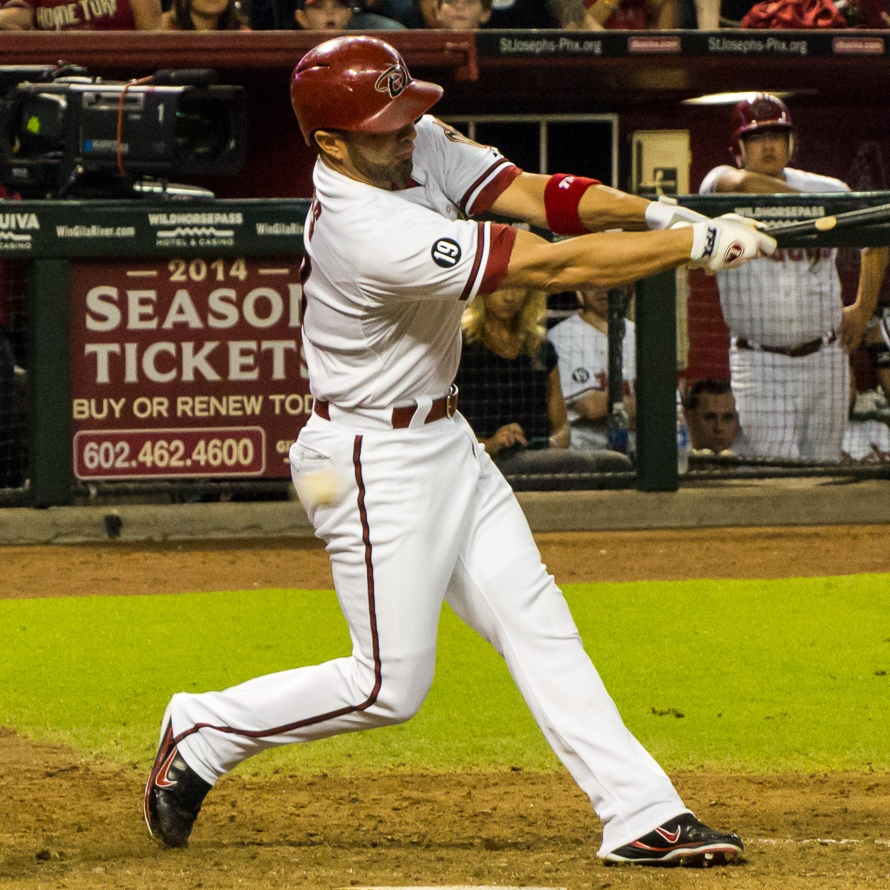
- Nieves with the Arizona Diamondbacks in 2013
- Catcher
- Born: September 25, 1977 (age 48); San Juan, Puerto Rico
- Batted: Right Threw: Right

MLB debut
- July 21, 2002, for the San Diego Padres

Last MLB appearance
- April 29, 2015, for the San Diego Padres

MLB statistics
- Batting average: .241
- Home runs: 10
- Runs batted in: 114
- Stats at Baseball Reference

Teams
- San Diego Padres (2002); New York Yankees (2005–2007); Washington Nationals (2008–2010); Milwaukee Brewers (2011); Colorado Rockies (2012); Arizona Diamondbacks (2012–2013); Philadelphia Phillies (2014); San Diego Padres (2015)

Wilbert Nieves (born September 25, 1977) is a Puerto Rican former professional baseball catcher and current minor league coach. He played in Major League Baseball (MLB) for the San Diego Padres, New York Yankees, Washington Nationals, Milwaukee Brewers, Colorado Rockies, Arizona Diamondbacks, and Philadelphia Phillies.

== Playing career ==
=== San Diego Padres ===
Nieves was selected by the Padres in the 47th round of the 1995 MLB draft. He made his major league debut on July 21, 2002, for the San Diego Padres, and played 28 games with them during their 2002 season.

=== Anaheim/Los Angeles Angels ===
Nieves was selected off waivers by the Anaheim Angels on December 20, 2002.

=== New York Yankees ===
He was traded to the New York Yankees for pitcher Bret Prinz. Nieves won a spot on the Yankees 2007 roster by beating out Todd Pratt and Raul Chavez during spring training. He served as the back-up catcher to Jorge Posada, but was primarily considered Mike Mussina's "personal catcher." Joe Torre experimented with using Nieves to help bolster Mussina out of a rough stretch with good results.

Nieves made his first career non-catching appearance in the ninth inning of a game on July 8, 2007, against the Angels; he played first base when the Yankees ran low on position players.

Following an impressive 2-for-3 performance against the Tampa Bay Devil Rays on July 21, 2007, Nieves was designated for assignment by the Yankees following news that they had acquired José Molina from the Los Angeles Angels of Anaheim. Though respected as a good defensive catcher, Nieves hit just .164 for the Yankees.

"It's just business and I really want this team to go all the way to the playoffs and, hopefully, win the World Series," Nieves said. "They're a bunch of great guys. I love them, Torre and all those guys. They can improve the backup catcher and they're bringing in Molina. He's a great catcher, too."

Nieves cleared waivers, and reported to the Yankees' Triple-A Scranton/Wilkes-Barre Yankees on July 27, 2007. Nieves was the starting catcher for Scranton. He declared free agency in October 2007. He played for Licey in the Dominican Winter League during the off-season.

=== Washington Nationals ===
He started the 2008 season in the Washington Nationals organization with the Triple-A Columbus Clippers of the International League. On April 25, 2008, Nieves hit his first major-league home run, a walk-off home run to right field, to give the Nationals a 5–3 win over the Chicago Cubs. Nieves was the backup catcher to starter Jesus Flores in the 2009 season. Nieves was the backup catcher for Iván Rodríguez in 2010.

=== Milwaukee Brewers ===
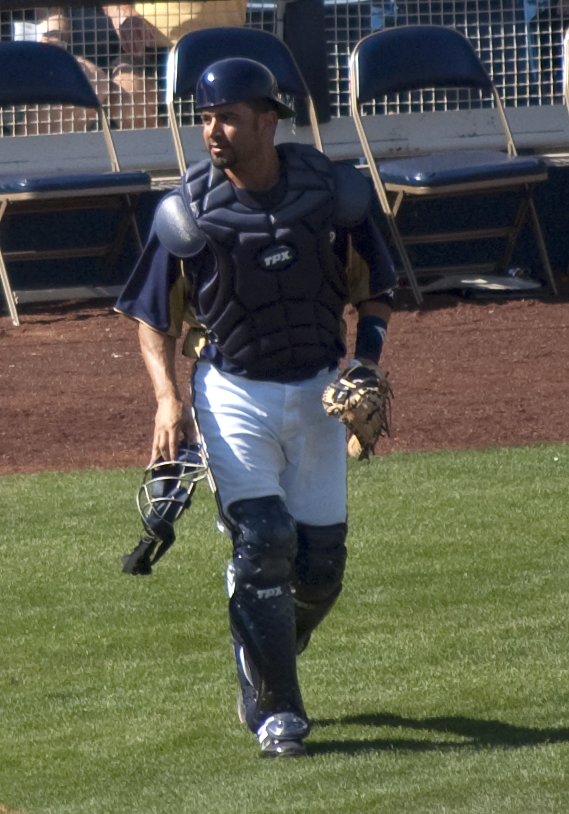
Nieves playing with the Milwaukee Brewers in 2011 spring training

On December 10, 2010, Nieves signed a one-year deal with the Milwaukee Brewers.

=== Atlanta Braves ===
He was traded to the Atlanta Braves on July 27, 2011, for $1. He was demoted to Triple-A Gwinnett shortly after, and J. C. Boscan was recalled to be the backup catcher.

=== Colorado Rockies ===
On December 18, 2011, Nieves signed a minor league deal with the Colorado Rockies worth $414,000. After hitting .409 with 1 HR in 18 games in spring training, he was reassigned before the season started. On May 25, 2012, Nieves was called up to replace Ramón Hernández, who was placed on the 15-day disabled list. Nieves was hitting .299 with 3 HR and 14 RBI in 28 games with Triple-A Colorado Springs. During his time up there, he acted as a mentor to Wilin Rosario and was used to try to solve Jeremy Guthrie's problems. On July 13, Nieves was placed on the 15-day disabled list with a turf toe in his right foot. However, on August 1, he was designated for assignment to clear roster space. Nieves was hitting .298 with 1 HR and 5 RBI in 16 games. He elected free agency on August 6.

=== Arizona Diamondbacks ===
Nieves signed with the Arizona Diamondbacks on August 6, 2012. Nieves scored a two-run homer on his debut August 9, 2012 at the Pittsburgh Pirates in a 6 to 3 win.

=== Philadelphia Phillies ===
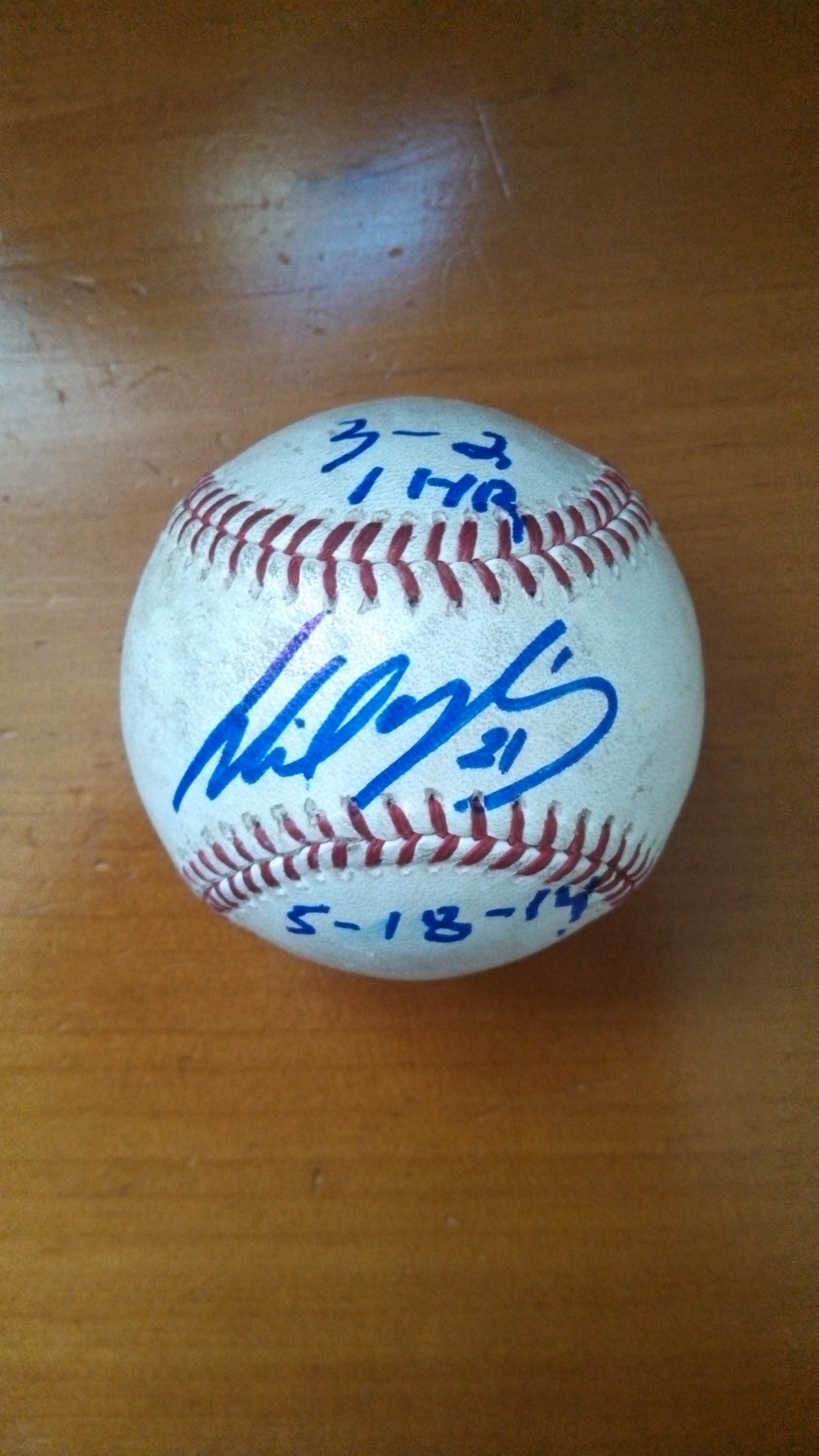
Baseball signed by Wil Nieves after Reds – Phillies game May 18, 2014

On December 4, 2013, Nieves signed with the Philadelphia Phillies. Nieves made the Phillies Opening Day roster in 2014 as the backup catcher to Carlos Ruiz. On June 18, he injured his leg while running the bases during a start against Atlanta. He exited the game, and the Phillies recalled catcher Cameron Rupp to serve as Ruiz's backup while Nieves healed. Nieves had only played in 14 games to that date, all starts to give Ruiz some rest.

=== Return to San Diego Padres ===
Nieves signed a minor league contract with the San Diego Padres on February 4, 2015. He made the Padres' opening day roster as back-up to catcher Derek Norris after Tim Federowicz suffered a season-ending knee injury during spring training. Nieves appeared in six games for the Padres in 2015 and collected one hit in thirteen at-bats, an April 12 grand slam against the San Francisco Giants. Nieves was designated for assignment on May 4, 2015, and chose to become a free agent.

=== Braves organization ===
The Braves signed Nieves to a minor league contract, and he batted .238 for AAA Gwinnett, but the Braves released him on June 22, 2015.

== Post-playing career ==
In 2019, Nieves joined the Boston Red Sox' minor league system as a coach with the Class A-Advanced Salem Red Sox.
