= Erick Almonte =

Dominican baseball player (born 1978)

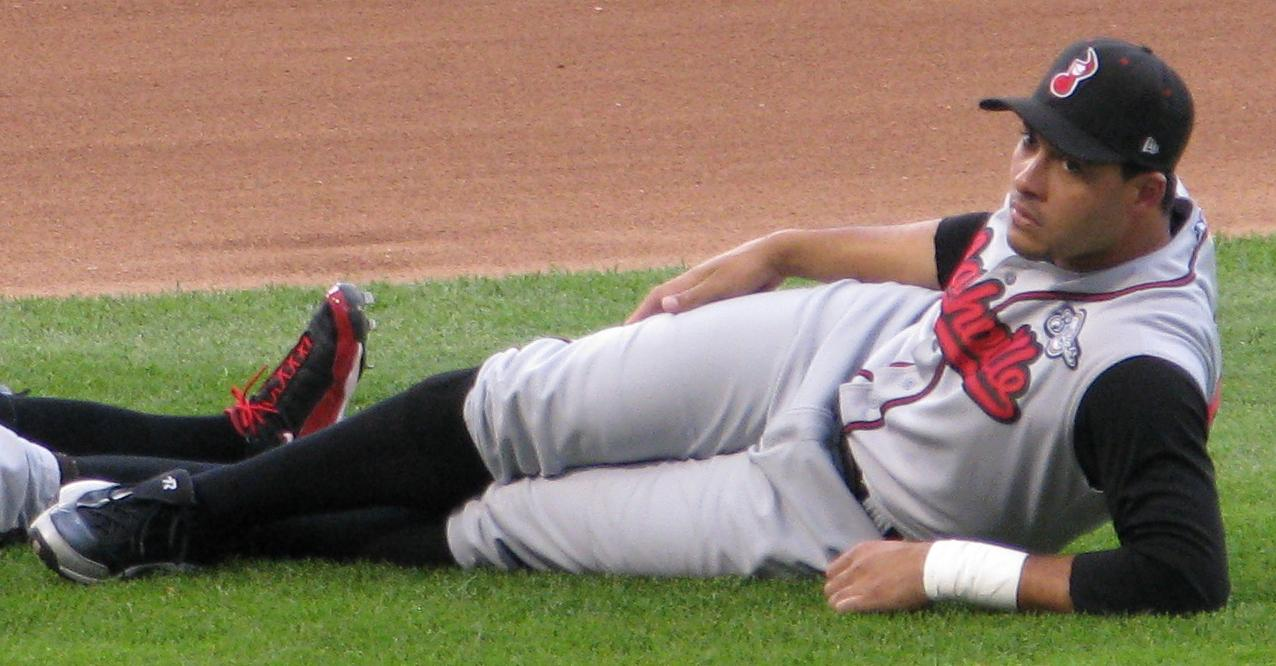
- Almonte with the Nashville Sounds
- Shortstop
- Born: February 1, 1978 (age 48); Santo Domingo, Dominican Republic
- Batted: Right Threw: Right

Professional debut
- MLB: September 4, 2001, for the New York Yankees
- NPB: March 26, 2005, for the Hokkaido Nippon Ham Fighters

Last appearance
- MLB: April 25, 2011, for the Milwaukee Brewers
- NPB: August 3, 2015, for the Hokkaido Nippon Ham Fighters

MLB statistics
- Batting average: .233
- Home runs: 2
- Runs batted in: 14
- Stats at Baseball Reference

Teams
- New York Yankees (2001, 2003); Hokkaido Nippon-Ham Fighters (2005); Milwaukee Brewers (2011)

Erick R. Almonte (born February 1, 1978) is a Dominican former professional baseball shortstop. He played in Major League Baseball (MLB) for the New York Yankees and Milwaukee Brewers, and in Nippon Professional Baseball (NPB) for the Hokkaido Nippon-Ham Fighters. He is currently the hitting coach for the Florida Complex League Cardinals.

== Playing career ==
Almonte was signed by the New York Yankees as an amateur free agent in 1996. He spent four years in the minors before getting called up in 2001. He made his debut on September 4, 2001. After spending the 2002 season in the Yankees minor league system, he was called up in 2003 after Derek Jeter suffered an injury, and was the team's starting shortstop until Jeter returned.

Almonte spent the 2004 season in the Colorado Rockies organization after getting released by the Yankees. In November 2004, the Cleveland Indians signed him to a minor league contract, but, without playing any games, they sold his contract to the Hokkaido Nippon Ham Fighters of Japan's Pacific League. In 2006, he played for the Long Island Ducks of the Atlantic League.

On October 31, 2007, he signed a minor league deal with the Detroit Tigers. He became a free agent after the 2008 season and signed a minor league contract with the Chicago Cubs in January 2009. He became a free agent during spring training, and the signed a minor league contract with the Milwaukee Brewers. He played the entire 2009 and 2010 seasons with the Triple-A Nashville Sounds. His minor league contract was purchased by the Brewers at the conclusion of spring training in 2011. Almonte hit his first home run in nearly 10 years for the Brewers against the Reds on Saturday, April 2, 2011. He was outrighted to Triple-A Nashville on June 3, 2011.

== Coaching career ==
Almonte served as the manager of the St. Louis Cardinals' rookie Gulf Coast League Cardinals in 2018. He was later named manager of the Peoria Chiefs for the 2019 season.

Almonte was named hitting coach for the FCL Cardinals for the 2024 season.

== Personal ==
His brother, Héctor, played in the majors in 1999 and 2003 for the Florida Marlins, Boston Red Sox, and Montreal Expos.

On April 26, 2011, Almonte became the first player to be placed on MLB's concussion-based 7-day disabled list.
