= Tom Vandergriff =

American politician

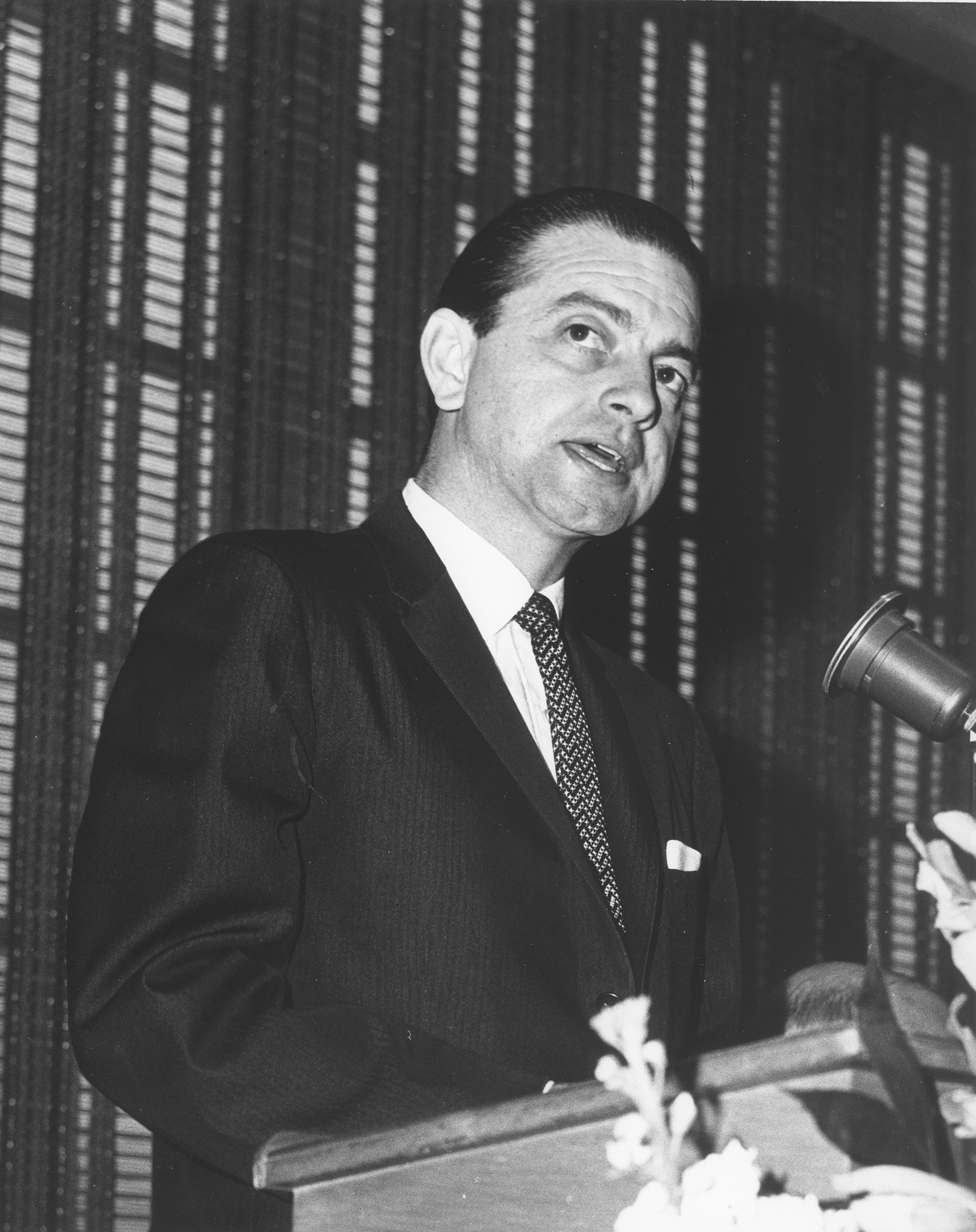
- Vandergriff in 1959

Member of the U.S. House of Representatives from Texas's 26th district
- In office January 3, 1983 – January 3, 1985
- Preceded by: District created
- Succeeded by: Dick Armey

County Judge of Tarrant County, Texas
- In office 1991 – January 2007
- Preceded by: Roy English
- Succeeded by: B. Glen Whitley

Mayor of Arlington, Texas
- In office April 3, 1951 – January 11, 1977
- Preceded by: B. C. Barnes
- Succeeded by: SJ Stovall

Personal details
- Born: January 29, 1926 Carrollton, Texas, U.S.
- Died: December 30, 2010 (aged 84) Fort Worth, Texas, U.S.
- Party: Democratic (1951 – c. 1990); Republican (c. 1990 – 2010)
- Education: USC
- Occupation: G.M.Automobile Dealer
- Texas House Resolution 18, 2007

Tommy Joe Vandergriff (January 29, 1926 – December 30, 2010) was a politician from Texas. He served as Mayor of Arlington from 1951 to 1977, as a U.S. Representative from Texas's 26th congressional district from 1983 to 1985, and as County Judge of Tarrant County from 1991 to 2007. For the greater part of his life, Vandergriff was a Democrat, but he became a Republican around 1990.

As Mayor, he was instrumental in several projects, including a new General Motors assembly plant, moving a Major League Baseball franchise to Arlington, and the opening of Six Flags over Texas.

== Early life and education ==
Tom Vandergriff was born in Carrollton, Texas on January 29, 1926. His father, William Thomas "Hooker" Vandergriff was a prominent businessman who operated a local car dealership with his father, John Thomas Vandergriff. In 1937, Hooker and his wife, Charles Pleasant Mayes, moved the family to nearby Arlington to open a new downtown Chevrolet dealership. At the time, Arlington was just 1 square mile (640 acres) with 3,500 residents.

Growing up, Vandergriff suffered from a speech impediment. With the help of a speech therapist, he overcame the disability and developed an interest in oratory and a deep, baritone voice.

By the time Vandergriff was 16 years old, he applied to work as a radio broadcaster for KFJZ in Fort Worth, which was operated by Elliott Roosevelt, the son of President Franklin D. Roosevelt. Vandergriff had sent an audition tape to the station, who hired him before learning of his age.

In 1947, Vandergriff graduated from the University of Southern California earning a bachelor's degree in broadcast journalism. After graduating, he auditioned for a position at KNX radio in Los Angeles, only to lose the job to Chet Huntley. Huntley would go on to co-anchor the NBC evening news program, The Huntley-Brinkley Report.

Feeling a sense of rejection, Vandergriff moved back to Arlington to work for his father's Chevrolet dealership. Two years later, in 1949, he married his high school sweetheart, Anna Waynette Smith, and later that year became president of the Arlington Chamber of Commerce.

== Mayor of Arlington ==
During his 26 years as Mayor of Arlington from 1951 to 1977, Tom Vandergriff brought a General Motors assembly plant into Arlington, brought the Washington Senators to Arlington as the Texas Rangers, saw Arlington State College elevated to University status and become The University of Texas at Arlington, helped create the Dallas/Fort Worth International Airport, and saw Arlington grow from about 8,000 people to over 120,000. Vandergriff served as founding president of the North Central Texas Council of Governments, as the first chair of the Texas Advisory Commission on Intergovernmental Relations, and as a member of Lyndon B. Johnson's White House Commission on Urban Problems.

Arlington Memorial Hospital

In 1958, the Vandergriff family spearheaded the original fund-raising effort and donated the land to construct Arlington's first hospital, Arlington Memorial Hospital. In honor of their contributions, the hospital dedicated the Vandergriff Professional Building on campus.

Tom Vandergriff served as the hospital board chairman for more than 35 years, and in 2007, the Tom Vandergriff Surgical Tower was named in his honor.

Arlington's Sister City

Following the aftermath of World War II, Allied forces divided Germany into sectors. The Bavarian town of Bad Königshofen fell just three miles west of the Soviet Sector. As the threat of Communism grew, refugees fled across the border, overwhelming the small farming community of just 5,000 residents. In 1951, Vandergriff and the City of Arlington voted to adopt Bad Königshofen as Arlington's sister city and organized a charity drive called "Let Freedom Ring." On February 1, 1952, hundreds of Arlington residents gathered downtown to launch the first of numerous relief shipment – 12 tons of food, clothing and supplies loaded in railroad boxcars.

In honor of the long-standing friendship, Bad Königshofen named the town's only municipal park after Arlington with the city's "Flying A" logo carved into a 14-ton stone. In return, Arlington constructed the Bad Königshofen Recreation Area at S.J. Stovall Park. Today, Arlington holds its annual Christkindl market in December. The event was inspired from a city visit to Bad Königshofen in 2011. Arlington's Christkindl market has grown into the largest of its kind in the South, with approximately 100,000 visitors in 2013.

The University of Texas at Arlington

Tom Vandergriff was one of the driving influences behind the transformation of Arlington State College (ASC) into The University of Texas at Arlington.

Throughout the 1950s, Mayor Vandergriff and Arlington State College led campaigns to turn the two-year college into a four-year university, which at the time was an affiliate of Texas A&M University. In 1951, 1955, and 1957, the school sent bills to the Texas Legislature with no success. But, on April 27, 1959, Governor Price Daniel finally signed the bill making ASC a four-year university. Vandergriff later recalled the signing of the bill "one of the most satisfying moments of his life."

In the early 1960s, the 50-year relationship between Arlington State College and Texas A&M began to deteriorate over issues regarding graduate school and the construction of new facilities. In 1965, Mayor Vandergriff worked with State Senator Don Kennard to remove Arlington State College from Texas A&M and transfer the school to the University of Texas System. On April 23, 1965, Governor John Connally signed the bill officially transferring ASC to the University of Texas System. Later in 1967, the school was renamed The University of Texas at Arlington.

Six Flags Over Texas

While attending the University of Southern California, Vandergriff became fascinated with the post-war growth of the greater Los Angeles area, particularly with Anaheim. Disneyland first opened in 1955 and by 1960 the city was to be awarded a Major League Baseball expansion franchise. Vandergriff felt that Arlington could also be the beneficiary of such development and become an entertainment destination as well.

In 1958, Vandergriff met with Walt Disney in an attempt to persuade him into building a second Disneyland park. At the urging of Vandergriff, developer Angus Wynne Jr. and the Great Southwest Corp. offered Mr. Disney the land for the project, but Disney ultimately rejected the offer. Instead, Wynne chose to develop the park on his own calling it Texas Under Six Flags.

In August 1961, the $10 million theme park opened its gates to the public under a new name, Six Flags Over Texas. Since then, the park has attracted 3 million visitors each year and has become a nationally recognized brand.

Seven Seas

With the success of Six Flags Over Texas, Mayor Vandergriff wanted to capitalize on Arlington's entertainment district and build a second theme park that would flank Turnpike Stadium (later renamed Arlington Stadium). In the late 1960s, Vandergriff approached Walter Knott of Knott's Berry Farm about building a similar park in Arlington. When Knott declined, he suggested Vandergriff explore the newly built marine park in San Diego, SeaWorld. Founder George Millay also rejected Vandergriff's offer. With a marine park in mind, Vandergriff turned back to Angus G. Wynne of Six Flags with the idea. Vandergriff and Wynne agreed that Arlington would finance the building of the park and Wynne would design and operate it.

In 1972, Seven Seas opened it gates to the public. The park was located directly next to Turnpike Stadium, adjacent to Six Flags. Similar to SeaWorld, the park featured birds, elephant seals, dolphins, and a killer whale named Newtka. By the time the park opened, the project had cost the city $10 million, $2.4 million over budget. The park lost $500,000 in its first season and continued with losses of $462,000 in 1973 and $516,000 in 1974. Then in 1975, SeaWorld and George Millay, who initially refused to listen to Vandergriff, offered to purchase Seven Seas for the 1975 season, provided the city sell the animals to him for $125,000. The city agreed and Millay remodeled the park hoping to boost attendance. But, the park ended up losing money, once again, and the park was forced to close in 1976. Vandergriff took much of the responsibility for the park's failure and worried the debacle would one day damage his achievements.

Resignation

During a regularly scheduled council meeting in January 1977, Vandergriff unexpectedly announced his resignation, effective immediately. Vandergriff's 13th term would be expiring that April, and had he resigned earlier, a special election would have been required to fill the remainder of the term. Vandergriff purposely waited within 90 days in order to avoid the city from having to finance a special election. Mayor Pro Tem S.J. Stovall succeeded Vandergriff to fill the remainder of the term. He would go on to win the general election and serve six terms

== U.S. House of Representatives ==
Election of 1982

Prior to the 1982 election, both political parties heavily lobbied Vandergriff to run on their respective tickets in the newly formed 26th District. The district lines were set up to favor a Republican, having been carried by President Reagan with 67.1 percent of the vote in 1980, but Vandergriff ultimately chose to run as a Democrat. His opponent was Republican candidate Jim Bradshaw, who had previously run for District 12, but lost to incumbent Jim Wright then serving as House Majority Leader.

Despite personal campaigning from Vice President George H. W. Bush, Bradshaw lost the election to Vandergriff by only 436 votes. The race was so close, Bradshaw asked for a recount. But, Vandergriff's election was confirmed, having won 50.1% of the vote, by a newly counted 344 votes.

98th Congress

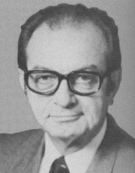
Tom Vandergriff in 1983

Tom Vandergriff was sworn into the 98th Congress on January 3, 1983. He was assigned to the Public Works and Transportation Committee, serving on the Subcommittees on Aviation and Surface Transportation, as well as the Select Aging Committee and the Small Business Committee. During his term in Congress, Vandergriff favored a decrease in congressional salaries, advocated for better military service benefits, and supported Texas Instruments efforts to keep the $7 million HARM program. Known as a conservative Democrat, Vandergriff often broke party lines, even voting against his party's 1984 alternative budget, which included a $174 billion deficit.

Equal Rights Amendment

In 1983, Vandergriff co-sponsored a revival of the Equal Rights Amendment with full support from Speaker of the House Tip O'Neill. The bill contained nine amendments, most notably pertaining to issues of abortion and women's military service. The bill was ultimately shot down in the house because it did not receive two-thirds majority vote. In a last-ditch effort to push the bill through, O’Neil broke procedure and brought the bill to the floor by suspending House rules, which would thus not allow for any amendments to be included. Disappointed by the break in procedure, Vandergriff, along with 13 other co-sponsors from both political parties, reversed course and withdrew support from the bill.

Military spending in Nicaragua

In 1983, Majority Leader Jim Wright and Speaker O’Niell proposed an annual intelligence authorization bill opposed by President Reagan that would defund undercover U.S. military aid to the Nicaraguan rebel group fighting the Sandanistas government. Vandergriff, once again, broke party lines and supported President Reagan. The bill would go on to pass by a 228–195 vote.

Election of 1984 and defeat

In 1983, a House redistricting committee approved a bill that would incorporate roughly 50,000 more residents from Arlington in the 26th Congressional district. Although the district still leaned Republican, the move was considered favorable to Vandergriff's re-election bid. However, Tom was defeated by Republican candidate Dick Armey, former chairman of the economic department at North Texas State University, by riding a wave of straight Republican voting and a last-minute media blitz by President Reagan. Tom's campaign left him with almost $800,000 in debt from spending his own money and Armey would go on to become House Majority Leader from 1995 until his retirement in 2003. To date, Vandergriff is the last Democrat to garner even 40 percent of the vote in the district.

Vandergriff considered running again in 1986 in an attempt to regain the seat, but ultimately declined. Sports announcer Bill Mercer, one of the original Texas Rangers broadcasters in 1972, called Vandergriff's defeat in 1984 "one of the great tragedies of politics in this part of Texas."

== County judge ==
Tom Vandergriff was elected Tarrant County Judge in 1990. He won as a Republican and served in that capacity for 16 years until his retirement in 2007. During his tenure, he was instrumental in building a $41 million Family Law Center, developing the Trinity River Uptown Plan, selling its convention center to Fort Worth, and playing a role in bringing the Dallas Cowboys to Arlington. Tarrant County also implemented an expanded, online tax-payment system that won an Excellence Award from the Texas Association of Governmental Information Technology Managers.

Intermodal Surface Transportation Efficiency Act

In 1991, newly elected County Judge Tom Vandergriff worked with the Texas Congressional delegation, Fort Worth Mayor Kay Granger, and Dallas County officials to advocate for a $151 billion transportation bill which would create roughly 900,000 jobs annually over its six-year life. On December 18, President George H. W. Bush traveled to Dallas–Fort Worth to sign the bill into law. Bush hailed the bill as the most important transportation act since President Dwight D. Eisenhower launched the interstate system 35 years prior.

The Heartbeat of Arlington

Since 1954, the General Motors plant in Arlington, now the seventh-largest city in Texas, remained a driving force for the local and state economy. However, the economy began to weaken during the recession of the early 1990s, which hit General Motors hard as they struggled to compete with foreign rivals amidst a narrowing budget.

In a cost saving attempt, chief executive Robert C. Stempel announced that the company would close either the Arlington plant or its sister plant in Ypsilanti, Michigan to consolidate the production resources of the rear-wheel car. Stempel called Arlington Mayor Richard Greene to let him know of the pending decision. Immediately, Greene phoned Judge Vandergriff, who offered his support. Vandergriff would recall in an interview with the New York Times that the plant had been a "Rock of Gilbraltar for us [the city] that gave us confidence to do some great things. You simply couldn’t imagine in your worst nightmare losing an entity like General Motors."

The potential closure was part of a plan to rid the company of 74,000 jobs and 21 plants. The loss of the Arlington plant would cut 3,800 local jobs and another 4,000 jobs from local suppliers and other retailers. In an Arlington press conference, Governor Ann Richards said the plant would cost the state economy $816 million a year. The plant's closing would also deal a major blow to the city's economy which, at the time, contributed nearly $4 million in local taxes, including $2.1 million for schools.

Once again, Greene and Vandergriff teamed together to spearhead a public campaign called "Keep GM, the Heartbeat of Arlington." Within weeks, the campaign developed into a statewide effort involving Richards, Senators Lloyd Bentsen and Phil Gramm, and the Texas Congressional delegation. The effort culminated in the creation of an economic incentive package that would provide GM up to $23 million in tax and utility breaks. The state also offered to train 1 million workers.

After months of lobbying from the Texas contingent, General Motors elected to keep the Arlington operation open and close the Ypsilanti plant. GM would thus move production of the full-size Oldsmobile, Buick and Chevrolet station wagons to Arlington by 1993. Over 3–4 years, 1,000 jobs would be added.

Cowboys Stadium

As County Judge, Vandergriff was instrumental in luring the Dallas Cowboys to Arlington with the campaign "A Win for Arlington." He was featured in a series of TV and radio commercials promoting the public funding of the construction of a new $650 million stadium.

Retirement

In 2006, Vandergriff announced he would not seek reelection. He would officially retire from public office in 2007 at the age of 80.

== Major League Baseball ==
Judge Roy Hofheinz of the Houston Astros tried to block any attempt Vandergriff made in his efforts to bring a ball club to Arlington, which he attempted to do for over ten years. In 1971, Washington Senators owner Bob Short was wanting to relocate his team, managed by baseball legend Ted Williams.

Many people in the D.C. area were highly opposed to the move. Vandergriff was thrown out of a cab because the driver learned who he was. Ultimately, the Washington Senators relocated to Arlington's Turnpike Stadium. The stadium was expanded and renamed Arlington Stadium.

=== The Texas Rangers ===
==== Sports broadcaster ====
When the Senators moved to Texas, the City of Arlington agreed to pay the Rangers $7.5 million over 10 years in return for the radio-TV rights. In an effort to save the city approximately $50,000 per year, Tom worked without pay as the color commentator for Texas Rangers TV broadcasts from 1975 to 1977 alongside play-by-play announcer Dick Risenhoover. Vandergriff was also known for spending his own money on traveling expenses for road games.

==== The Ballpark in Arlington ====
In 1989, a group of investors led by future president George W. Bush and Dallas financier Edward "Rusty" Rose purchased the team from oil man Eddie Chiles. The group named investor Tom Schieffer as Partner-In-Charge of Ballpark development and charged him to select a site to build a new stadium. After Schieffer decided Arlington was the best location in Dallas–Fort Worth to build a new stadium, Arlington Mayor Richard Greene led the efforts, with the help of Vandergriff, to convince Arlington voters to raise $135 million in bonds for its construction. In 1991, the bond package was passed by a two-to-one margin.

The new stadium, named The Ballpark in Arlington, opened its gates for its inaugural season in 1994.

==== Texas Rangers Hall of Fame ====
In 2004, Tom Vandergriff was inducted into the Texas Rangers Baseball Hall of Fame along with Gold Glove third baseman Buddy Bell and Hall of Fame pitcher Ferguson Jenkins.

==== Memorialized ====
In 1997, a full-size bronze statue of Vandergriff was dedicated in the centerfield plaza, which bears the name Vandergriff Plaza.

== Car Dealerships ==
Tom Vandergriff worked in his family's businesses including a chain of car dealerships. His father, Hooker, owned Vandergriff Chevrolet and Vandergriff Buick, until he split the dealerships between Vandergriff and Vandergriff's sister, Ginger.

After losing his Congressional re-election bid, Vandergriff returned home to operate the family car dealerships. With a mountain of campaign debt, the Vandergriff family fortune had weakened. Then in 1989, Vandergriff's son, Victor Vandergriff, purchased the family's interest and steered it through the recession of the early 1990s. In 1997, Victor and a group of investors sold the car chain to V.T. Inc., where he would serve as the company's vice president. Victor later served as Chairman of the Department of Motor Vehicles Board from 2009 to 2013 and in March 2013, was appointed by Governor Rick Perry to serve as a member of the Texas Transportation Commission.

In 2014, Berkshire Hathaway Automotive INC. purchased V.T. Inc. Today, the dealership chain include Chevrolet, Toyota, Acura, Honda, and Hyundai.

== Personal life ==
=== The JFK assassination ===
During the 1960 Presidential election, then Senator John F. Kennedy and Lyndon B. Johnson traveled in a parade through Dallas–Fort Worth making a campaign stop in Arlington. The motorcade was greeted by Mayor Vandergriff and a crowd of thousands near the downtown Arlington State Bank.

Three years later, on November 22, 1963, Vandergriff attended a breakfast in Fort Worth hosted by the Fort Worth Chamber of Commerce in honor of President Kennedy. Vandergriff was part of a welcome "honor guard" that escorted President Kennedy at the Hotel Texas. When news broke of the assassination, Vandergriff was still in the car traveling home from the Fort Worth breakfast.

Coincidentally, Lee Harvey Oswald's mother, Marguerite, was the family's personal nurse. She was also employed by Amon G. Carter, a prominent businessman in Fort Worth. Just months before the assassination, Lee Oswald and his wife, Marina, visited the Vandergriff home to pick up a high chair for their newborn daughter.

== Death ==
At the age of 84, Vandergriff was in attendance at Rangers Ballpark in Arlington on October 22, 2010, for the final game of the American League Championship Series in which the Rangers beat the New York Yankees 6–1. It would be his last public appearance. Later that night, Vandergriff fell and broke his hip, forcing him to miss the team's first World Series. Vandergriff died two months later.

In memory of Vandergriff, the Texas Rangers gave the family the very first 2010 American League Championship ring. In a statement from the organization, president and CEO Nolan Ryan said, "the passion and determined efforts of Tom Vandergriff made the Texas Rangers a reality nearly 40 years ago. Because of his work, we are able to celebrate an AL Championship."

On Opening Day of 2011, Rangers Ballpark in Arlington held a moment of silence to remember Vandergriff after the family unveiled a large banner of Vandergriff in left field that served as a season-long tribute.

== Legacy ==
In addition to statues of Tom Vandergriff at Globe Life Field and Arlington City Hall, there are several places in the Dallas–Fort Worth area named in Vandergriff's honor. Some of them include Vandergriff Park, the Vandergriff Building known as the Historic V, the Vandergriff Town Center, Vandergriff Plaza at Rangers Ballpark, Vandergriff Way adjacent to the General Motors plant, the Tom Vandergriff Surgical Tower at Arlington Memorial Hospital, and the Tom Vandergriff Civil Courts Building in downtown Fort Worth.

Posthumous honors

In 2012, The University of Texas at Arlington constructed College Park, a 22-acre (8.9 ha) mixed-use district with a state-of-the-art arena, retail shops, and student housing, including a dormitory named Vandergriff Hall, in honor of Vandergriff's contributions to the university.

In 2015, Tarrant County opened a new $74 million downtown-Fort Worth courthouse, officially named the Tom Vandergriff Civil Courts Building.

== See also ==
- Arlington, Texas
- Texas Rangers (baseball)
- 98th United States Congress
- List of mayors of Arlington, Texas

U.S. House of Representatives
Preceded by new district	Member of the U.S. House of Representatives from Texas's 26th congressional district 1983–1985	Succeeded by Dick Armey
Political offices
Preceded by B. C. Barnes	Mayors of Arlington, Texas; 1951–1977	Succeeded by SJ Stovall
Legal offices
Preceded by Roy English	Tarrant County, Texas County Judges; 1991–2007	Succeeded by B. Glen Whitley
