= Eric Farris =

American baseball player (born 1986)

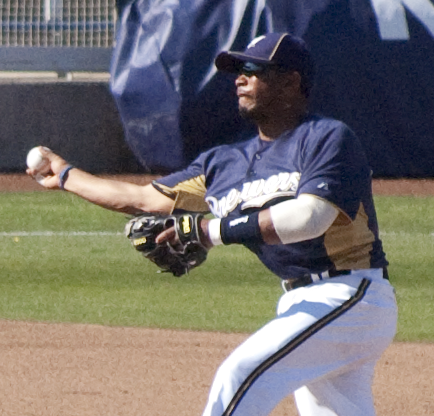
- Farris with the Milwaukee Brewers
- Second baseman / Left fielder
- Born: March 3, 1986 (age 39); Sacramento, California, U.S.
- Batted: Right Threw: Right

MLB debut
- July 28, 2011, for the Milwaukee Brewers

Last appearance
- October 2, 2012, for the Milwaukee Brewers

MLB statistics
- Batting average: .111
- Home runs: 0
- Runs batted in: 0
- Stats at Baseball Reference

Teams
- Milwaukee Brewers (2011–2012)

Eric Michael-Jay Farris (born March 3, 1986) is an American former professional baseball second baseman and left fielder. He played in Major League Baseball (MLB) for the Milwaukee Brewers. He was the manager for the Everett AquaSox, the High-A affiliate of the Seattle Mariners, during the 2022 season. He is currently the third base coach for the Tacoma Rainiers, the MiLB Triple-A affiliate of the Seattle Mariners.

== Personal life ==
Farris, who is Black and Filipino American, is the only son of Elizabeth and Darryl Farris. He has two sisters, Jeannette and Jessica, and is married to Kelley (Rose) Farris

== Amateur career ==
=== High school ===
Farris went to high school at Hamilton High School in Chandler, Arizona. With the Huskies, he hit .469 with 41 RBI and 50 runs scored, as well as 14 stolen bases, to lead them to back-to-back state titles. He was a Collegiate Baseball/TPX All-American and was named Arizona Player of the Year by the East Valley Tribune and the ABCA. He was selected in the 42nd round, 1269th overall in the 2004 MLB draft by the Atlanta Braves, but chose to play college with the Loyola Marymount Lions.

=== College ===
In 2005, he was slated to be their starting shortstop, but broke his hamate bone just before the season and missed six weeks. After returning in March at second base, he was second on the team in batting average, leading to a second-team All-WCC selection. In 2006, he led the team in numerous categories, with an All-WCC honorable mention. After the 2006 season, he played collegiate summer baseball with the Cotuit Kettleers of the Cape Cod Baseball League and was named a league all-star. 2007 was his best year as a Lion, leading the team in average, stolen bases, runs, hits, and total bases. He was a semifinalist for the Golden Spikes Award. He ended his career with the fourth most stolen bases in team history, despite only three seasons there.

== Professional career ==
=== Milwaukee Brewers ===
Farris was drafted by the Milwaukee Brewers in the 4th round, with the 131st overall selection, of the 2007 Major League Baseball draft. In 2007, he made his professional debut for their rookie-level affiliate, the Helena Brewers. Farris played all of the 2008 season with the Single-A West Virginia Power and all of the 2009 season with the High-A Brevard County Manatees. In 2010, Farris spent time in rehabilitation with the rookie-level Arizona League Brewers, and played the rest of the yearwith the Triple-A Nashville Sounds. He hit .256 in 98 games for Nashville before his first call-up.

On July 28, 2011, Farris was called up to the Brewers after they placed Rickie Weeks on the 15-day disabled list with a sprained left ankle. He made his debut that day, going 0–1 in a pinch-hit appearance, and not staying in the game. Farris was optioned back to Nashville the following day.

=== Minnesota Twins ===
On December 6, 2012, the Seattle Mariners selected Farris in the minor league phase of the Rule 5 draft. He was released by Seattle prior to the start of the season on March 29.

On April 1, 2013, Farris signed a minor league contract with the Minnesota Twins. He spent the year with the Triple-A Rochester Red Wings (also playing in one game for the Double-A New Britain Rock Cats, and batted .248/.301/.312 with three home runs, 31 RBI, and 23 stolen bases. Farris elected free agency following the season on November 4.

On January 6, 2014, Farris re-signed with the Twins organization on a minor league contract. Returning to Rochester, he played in 133 games and slashed .280/.316/.356 with four home runs, 44 RBI, and 16 stolen bases.

On November 18, 2014, Farris once more re-signed with Minnesota on a minor league contract. In 87 appearances for Rochester, he hit .259/.306/.310 with one home run, 29 RBI, and five stolen bases. Farris elected free agency on November 6, 2015.

=== Somerset Patriots ===
On February 25, 2016, Farris was confirmed to have signed with the Somerset Patriots of the Atlantic League of Professional Baseball. In 123 appearances for Somerset, he slashed .301/.354/.392 with eight home runs, 66 RBI, and 26 stolen bases. Farris became a free agent following the season.

== Coaching career ==
=== Seattle Mariners ===
Farris began his coaching career in 2018, joining the minor league side of his former team, the Seattle Mariners, in a variety of roles. He initially served as the hitting coach for both the Everett AquaSox and the Arizona League Mariners in 2018 before serving in the same role for the West Virginia Power in 2019.

Farris was in line to serve as the Power's manager for the 2020 campaign. However, the minor league season was cancelled as a result of the COVID-19 pandemic. The Power were dissolved following the realignment of Minor League Baseball after the cancelled 2020 season, and Farris spent the 2021 season as the manager of the Low-A Modesto Nuts.

He was announced to be returning to the Everett AquaSox as their manager for the 2022 season on February 2, 2022. He was named infield coach of the Tacoma Rainiers Triple-A affiliate of the Seattle Mariners of the 2023 season.

On January 24, 2024, Farris was announced as Tacoma's bench coach.

== Awards ==
- Golden Spikes Award Semifinalist - 2007
- Pioneer League Post-Season All-Star - 2007
- Florida State League Mid and Post-Season All-Star - 2009

== See also ==
- Rule 5 draft results
