= Cody Scarpetta =

American baseball player (born 1988)

- Pitcher
- Born: August 25, 1988 (age 38); Rockford, Illinois, U.S.
- Bats: Right Throws: Right
- Stats at Baseball Reference

Cody Michael Payne Scarpetta (born August 25, 1988) is an American former professional baseball pitcher. He is a phantom ballplayer, having spent a day on the active roster of the Milwaukee Brewers without making an appearance.

== Personal life ==
A second-generation minor league pitcher, he is the son of Dan Scarpetta (Brewers, Rangers, and Dodgers) and the nephew of Dennis Scarpetta (Phillies). His cousin Brett was drafted by the White Sox (18th round, 2005) and the Braves (38th round, 2006) but did not sign.

== Career ==
=== Milwaukee Brewers ===
Scarpetta was drafted by the Milwaukee Brewers in the 11th round of the 2007 amateur entry draft out of Guilford High School, signing him away from Creighton University on a $125,000 signing bonus. His original contract was voided, however, when it was discovered he needed surgery on his finger. He was signed to a new, one-year minor league contract, and could've become a minor league free agent after his first year, but that option was eliminated when the Brewers placed him on their roster, also protecting him from the Rule 5 draft.

In 2008, Scarpetta split the season between the rookie-level Arizona Brewers and Helena Brewers, going 2–0 in 12 appearances (8 starts) with a 2.23 ERA, striking out 58 in 36 1/3 innings. He pitched 2009 with the Single-A Wisconsin Timber Rattlers, where in 26 appearances (18 starts), he went 4–11 with a 3.43 ERA, striking out 116 in 105 innings. Scarpetta was promoted to the High-A Brevard County Manatees, where in 27 starts, he went 7–12 with a 3.87 ERA, striking out 142 in 128 innings. After the season, he was named the 4th best prospect in the Brewers organization by Baseball America. Scarpetta began 2011 with the Double-A Huntsville Stars, where in 23 starts, he went 8–5 with a 3.85 ERA, striking out 98 in 117 innings.

Scarpetta was called up to the majors on July 10, 2011, but did not pitch, and was sent down the next day, becoming a phantom ballplayer. After the season, he played with the Peoria Javelinas of the Arizona Fall League, and he struggled, going 0–3 in 4 starts with a 19.64 ERA. Scarpetta was named the 7th best prospect in the Brewers organization by Baseball America. Tommy John reconstructive elbow surgery kept him from playing in the 2012 season. He returned to baseball on June 2, 2013, with Brevard County. In 11 starts for the affiliate, Scarpetta went 0–5 with a 7.15 ERA and 36 walks in 34 innings. Scarpetta was released from the Brewers organization on December 21.

=== Lancaster Barnstormers ===
Scarpetta began 2014 with the independent Atlantic League's Lancaster Barnstormers, where he made 8 starts, going 0–3 with a 5.13 ERA and 37 strikeouts across 40 1/3 innings pitched.

=== Atlanta Braves ===
On June 12, 2014, Scarpetta signed a minor league contract with the Atlanta Braves; he was subsequently assigned to the High-A Lynchburg Hillcats. In 12 appearances (11 starts) for Lynchburg, he posted a 3–6 record and 4.50 ERA with 52 strikeouts over 58 innings of work. Scarpetta was released by the Braves organization on December 18.

=== Bridgeport Bluefish ===
Scarpetta signed with the Bridgeport Bluefish of the Atlantic League of Professional Baseball to begin the 2015 season. In 11 appearances (eight starts) for the Bluefish, Scarpetta pitched to a 1–4 record and 3.76 ERA with 40 strikeouts across 40 2/3 innings pitched.

=== York Revolution ===
After signing with the team in late August 2015, Scarpetta made five starts for the York Revolution of the Atlantic League of Professional Baseball, for whom he posted a 2–2 record and 3.96 ERA with 21 strikeouts over 25 innings of work. Scarpetta was released by the York Revolution on May 28, 2016.

=== St. Paul Saints ===
On May 29, 2016, Scarpetta signed with the St. Paul Saints of the American Association of Independent Professional Baseball. In five starts for the Saints, Scarpetta posted a 1–0 record and 4.30 ERA with 19 strikeouts over 23 innings of work.

=== Fargo-Moorhead RedHawks ===
On June 22, 2016, Scarpetta was claimed off waivers by the Fargo-Moorhead RedHawks of the American Association of Professional Baseball. In five starts for the RedHawks, Scarpetta compiled a 2–1 record and 4.61 ERA with 30 strikeouts across 27 2/3 innings pitched.
