= Brandon Boggs =

American baseball player (born 1983)

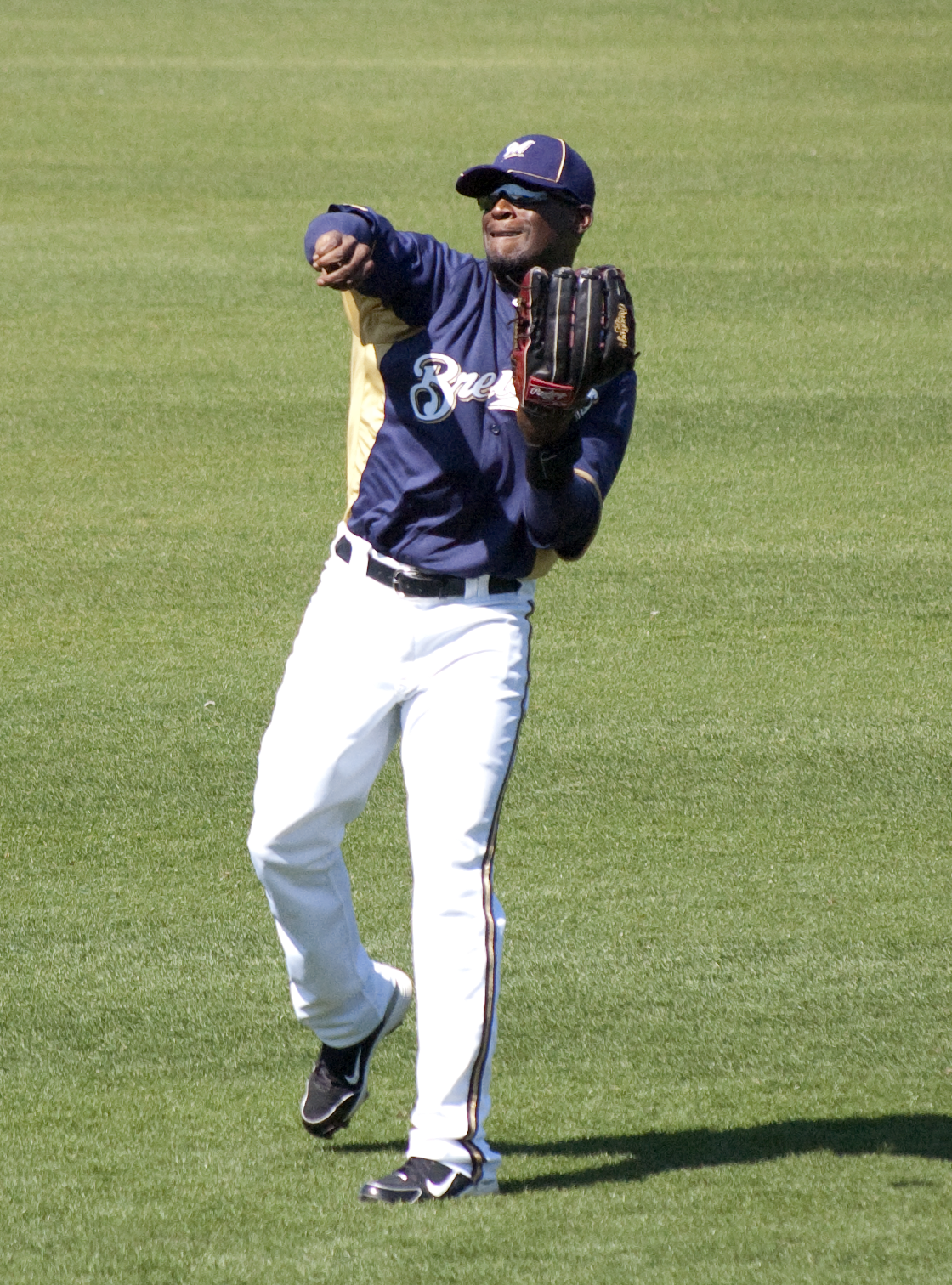
- Boggs with the Milwaukee Brewers
- Left fielder
- Born: January 9, 1983 (age 43); St. Louis, Missouri, U.S.
- Batted: Switch Threw: Right

MLB debut
- April 29, 2008, for the Texas Rangers

Last MLB appearance
- May 24, 2011, for the Milwaukee Brewers

MLB statistics
- Batting average: .209
- Home runs: 10
- Runs batted in: 43
- Stats at Baseball Reference

Teams
- Texas Rangers (2008–2010); Milwaukee Brewers (2011)

Brandon Kyle Boggs (born January 9, 1983) is an American former Major League Baseball (MLB) left fielder who played for the Texas Rangers and Milwaukee Brewers from 2008 to 2011. Currently, he is the head coach of the Alpharetta Aviators in the Sunbelt Baseball League.

== College ==
Boggs attended Georgia Tech, where he majored in Science, Technology, and Culture. In 2002 and 2003, he played collegiate summer baseball with the Orleans Cardinals of the Cape Cod Baseball League.

== Professional career ==
=== Texas Rangers ===
Boggs was selected in the 4th round (111th overall) of the 2004 Major League Baseball draft by the Texas Rangers.

=== Milwaukee Brewers ===
On November 23, 2010, Boggs signed a major league contract with the Milwaukee Brewers. Near the conclusion of spring training 2011, the Brewers sent him outright to the Triple-A Nashville Sounds. The Brewers purchased his contract on April 22. On May 26, he was outrighted to the minor leagues. Boggs declared for free agency on October 17.

=== Pittsburgh Pirates ===
The Pittsburgh Pirates signed Boggs to a minor league contract on November 22, 2011. He made 127 appearances for the Triple-A Indianapolis Indians, hitting .259/.359/.408 with nine home runs, 57 RBI, and six stolen bases. Boggs elected free agency following the season on November 2, 2012.

=== Minnesota Twins ===
On December 7, 2012, Boggs signed a minor league contract with the Minnesota Twins. He made 21 appearances for the Triple-A Rochester Red Wings, slashing .184/.292/.316 with two home runs and eight RBI. Boggs was released by the Twins organization on May 4, 2013.

=== Atlanta Braves ===
On May 6, 2013, Boggs signed a minor league contract with the Atlanta Braves. He made 99 appearances for the Triple-A Gwinnett Braves, hitting .248/.340/.361 with five home runs, 28 RBI, and four stolen bases. Boggs was released by the Braves organization on March 29, 2014.

On May 16, 2014, Boggs re-signed with the Braves organization on a minor league contract. In 92 appearances for Gwinnett over the course of the season, he batted .256/.322/.404 with seven home runs, 33 RBI, and five stolen bases.

=== Bridgeport Bluefish ===
On April 3, 2014, Boggs signed with the Bridgeport Bluefish of the Atlantic League of Professional Baseball. In 18 appearances for Bridgeport, Boggs batted .324/.390/.427 with one home run, seven RBI, and two stolen bases.

=== York Revolution ===
On March 27, 2015, Boggs signed with the York Revolution of the Atlantic League of Professional Baseball. He made 123 appearances for the Revolution, slashing .264/.371/.400 with 12 home runs, 47 RBI, and 10 stolen bases. Boggs became a free agent after the season.
