= Mike Rivera (baseball) =

Puerto Rican baseball player (born 1976)

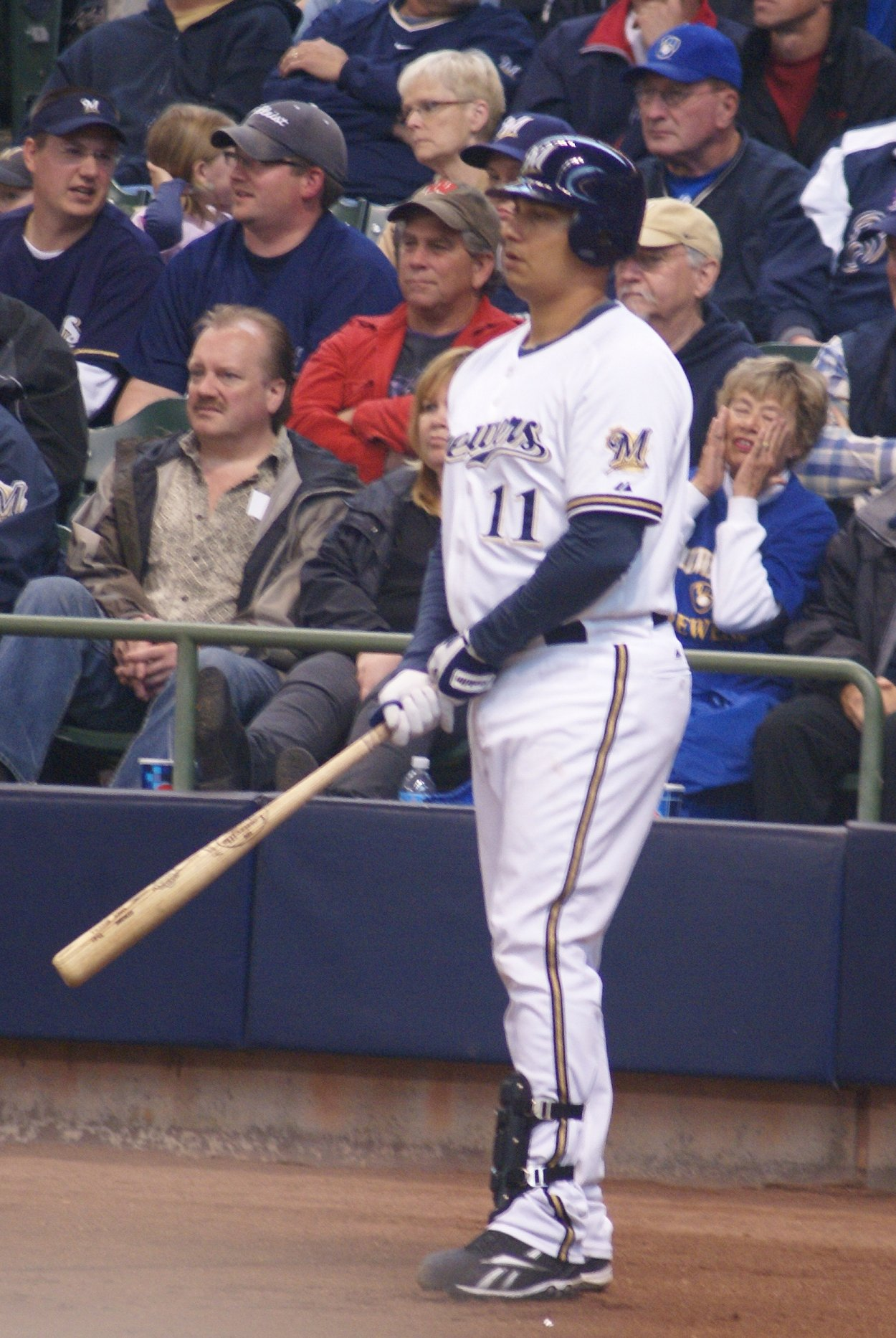
- Rivera with the Milwaukee Brewers
- Catcher
- Born: September 8, 1976 (age 49); Río Piedras, Puerto Rico
- Batted: Right Threw: Right

MLB debut
- September 18, 2001, for the Detroit Tigers

Last MLB appearance
- May 20, 2011, for the Milwaukee Brewers

MLB statistics
- Batting average: .239
- Home runs: 13
- Runs batted in: 69
- Stats at Baseball Reference

Teams
- Detroit Tigers (2001–2002); San Diego Padres (2003); Milwaukee Brewers (2006–2009); Florida Marlins (2010); Milwaukee Brewers (2011)

Michael Rene Rivera (born September 8, 1976) is a Puerto Rican former professional baseball catcher. He played for the Detroit Tigers, San Diego Padres, Milwaukee Brewers, and Florida Marlins during a nine-season Major League Baseball (MLB) career.

== Baseball career ==
=== Detroit Tigers ===
Rivera attended Troy State University (where he was a Mid-Continent Conference Eastern Division All-Star) and was signed by the Detroit Tigers as an amateur free agent in 1997. He began play that season with the Rookie League Gulf Coast League Tigers, batting .286 in 47 games. He played for the Class A West Michigan Whitecaps in 1998. In 1999, he played the majority of the season with the Class A-Advanced Lakeland Tigers, but also played a few games for the Double-A Jacksonville Suns. He returned to both Lakeland and Jacksonville in 2000 in addition to playing with the Triple-A Toledo Mud Hens. Rivera played the entire 2001 season with the Double-A Erie SeaWolves before being called up to the majors in September. He was a Gulf Coast League All-Star in 1997, a Florida State League All-Star in 1999, and an Eastern League All-Star in 2001.

He made his major league debut on September 18, 2001, for the Tigers against the Minnesota Twins as a late inning defensive replacement. His first start was on September 22 against the Boston Red Sox, he was hitless in four at-bats. He recorded his first major league hit on September 27 against the Kansas City Royals, a single to left field off Mike MacDougal. He appeared in a total of four games for the Tigers that season and another 39 in 2002. He hit his first career home run on April 4 against the Tampa Bay Devil Rays. He spent half of the 2002 season with Triple-A Toledo.

=== San Diego Padres ===
On November 15, 2002, he was traded by the Tigers to the San Diego Padres for Gene Kingsale. During the 2003 season, Rivera appeared in 19 games for the Padres and hit .170. He also played in 13 games for their Triple-A Portland Beavers, batting .160.

=== Chicago White Sox/Oakland Athletics ===
Rivera was placed on waivers by the Padres and selected by the Chicago White Sox on June 9, 2003. They assigned him to the Triple-A Charlotte Knights. Rivera began the 2004 season with Charlotte and batted .100 in 11 games. On April 22, he was selected off waivers again, this time by the Oakland Athletics. He played for the A's Triple-A team, the Sacramento River Cats in 2004, batting .224 in 49 appearances.

=== Milwaukee Brewers ===
He began the 2005 season with the Atlantic City Surf of the Independent Atlantic League but shortly signed with the Milwaukee Brewers as a free agent. He played the rest of the season with the Triple-A Nashville Sounds. His 2006 playing time was split between Nashville and Milwaukee. He served as the Brewers' backup to Damian Miller, then as a starter at the end of the season. With Miller returning in 2007, and the acquisition of Johnny Estrada from the Arizona Diamondbacks, Rivera began the season with Nashville, but also played in 11 games for Milwaukee. On June 25, 2007, he caught a perfect game with Sounds batterymate Manny Parra.

In 2008, he was again promoted to the majors as a backup for Jason Kendall, and also played first base occasionally. On August 13, 2009, Rivera had his first career multi-home run game against the San Diego Padres. He played three games for Nashville that season and the rest of the year with Milwaukee.

=== New York Yankees ===
On December 22, 2009, Rivera signed a minor league contract with the New York Yankees. On April 3, 2010, before the season began, he was released when the Yankees signed Chad Moeller to be their backup catcher for the Triple-A Scranton/Wilkes-Barre Yankees.

=== Los Angeles Dodgers ===
On April 20, 2010, Rivera signed with the Los Angeles Dodgers and was assigned to the Double-A Chattanooga Lookouts. On August 4, he was promoted to the Triple-A Albuquerque Isotopes. He was released on August 28. He hit .257 in 58 games with Chattanooga and .125 in 14 games for Albuquerque.

=== Florida Marlins ===
On September 2, 2010 he signed a minor league contract with the Florida Marlins and was assigned to the Triple-A New Orleans Zephyrs, where he hit .111 in three games. He appeared in seven games with the Marlins late in the season and was hitless in 14 at-bats.

=== Milwaukee Brewers (second stint) ===
On October 17, 2010, Rivera signed a minor-league contract with the Milwaukee Brewers for the 2011 season. He was called up to the major leagues on May 17, 2011 when Sean Green was designated for assignment. He elected to become a free agent following the season, but was re-signed by Milwaukee to a minor-league contract on December 9. The Brewers released Rivera on March 30, 2012.

=== Boston Red Sox ===
Rivera initially signed with the Long Island Ducks of the Atlantic League of Professional Baseball for the 2012 season. However, prior to the start of the season, on April 20, 2012, Rivera signed a minor league contract with the Boston Red Sox. He spent the remainder of the year with the Pawtucket Red Sox, Boston's Triple-A affiliate.
