= SJ Stovall =

Mayor of Arlington, Texas
- In office January 11, 1977 – 1983
- Preceded by: Tom Vandergriff
- Succeeded by: Harold Patterson

Personal details
- Born: September 26, 1925 Lufkin, Texas
- Died: July 14, 2010 (aged 84) Mansfield, Texas
- Spouse: Margie Stovall

SJ Stovall (September 26, 1925 – July 14, 2010) was an American politician and civil engineer. Stovall served as the mayor of Arlington, Texas, the seventh largest city in the state, from 1977 until 1983. In total, Stovall held office either on the Arlington City Council or as Mayor for twenty years.

== Biography ==
=== Early life ===
SJ Stovall was born on September 26, 1925, in Lufkin, Texas. Stovall's parents could not decide on a given name for their son so they wrote his father's initials, SJ, temporarily on his birth certificate. However, his parents never chose a permanent given name for Stovall, so SJ remained his legal first name. In a late 1970s interview with the Fort Worth Star-Telegram, he recalled, "I guess I was 13 before I realized that SJ – my father's initials – didn't stand for anything."

He enlisted in the United States Air Force before attending Texas A&M University.

=== Career ===
Stovall moved with his family to Arlington, Texas, in 1950 to take a position as a civil engineer with the United States Army Corps of Engineers. Stovall worked for Army Corps of Engineers for more than thirty years before his retirement.

He would later be elected to the Arlington City Council in 1963, where he served as a councilman and mayor until leaving office in 1983.

=== Mayor of Arlington ===
Stovall became Mayor of Arlington in January 1977, following the abrupt resignation of his predecessor, Tom Vandergriff. Vandergriff announced his resignation, effective immediately, at a regular Arlington city council meeting. Council members, including Stovall, were unaware of Vandergriff's intention to resign. Stovall, mayor pro tem at the time, became the new mayor of Arlington. In a 1983 interview, Stovall recalled his sudden, unexpected rise to the mayorship, "I felt some pressure, yes...As soon as I became mayor, I tried to make the point that Arlington was entering into another period in its life, and, in a way, I would be sort of a transition mayor. I would be a completely different type of mayor."

Vandergriff, Stovall's predecessor, has successfully brought the Texas Rangers baseball team and a General Motors assembly plant to Arlington during his tenure in office. However, city-owned, voter-funded Seven Seas Marine Life Park, which opened in 1972, proved to be a failure for Arlington. The park, which featured aquariums, a life-size pirate ship and killer whales, failed to attract enough visitors to keep the facility open. It was briefly renamed Hawaii Kai before low attendance forced the city council to close the attraction in 1976, just months before Stovall took office.

Stovall focused on improving the city's basic infrastructure and city services during his tenure as mayor. Arlington voters aided Stovall's efforts by approving two large bond programs, including a $69 million bond issue to improve the city's streets.

Stovall spearheaded the city's efforts to build the $10 million Arlington Convention Center and Sheraton Hotel on the site of the failed Seven Seas Marine Life Park. Voters also approved financing for the construction of the convention center. Through the construction of the convention center and other projects, Stovall is credited with turning Arlington's entertainment district into a tourism center. The development of the convention center also helped the city financially recover from the failure of the Seven Seas Marine Life Park.

Stovall is widely credited with leading a number of important projects in Arlington during his tenure as mayor, as well as his time on the city council. He recruited national companies, such as National Semi-Conductor, to relocate to the city. Stovall also led efforts to construct a new City Hall and create Leadership Arlington, which trained community members for positions within the local government. He also collaborated with the Texas Department of Transportation to build Interstate 20 through Arlington.

Stovall decided not to run for re-election in 1983. He was succeeded by Harold Patterson.

=== Later life ===
Just two months after leaving office as mayor, Stovall was appointed by County Judge Mike Moncrief, who is now the mayor of Fort Worth, to serve on the Tarrant County Commissioners Court. Moncrief appointed Stovall to the court following the death of Commissioner Jerry Mebus. He remained on the court until his loss to O.L. Watson in 1984.

The city of Arlington named the 52-acre (210,000 m^{2}) SJ Stovall Park in honor of the former mayor in 1991. Stovall served on the board of trustees for Arlington Memorial Hospital, the president of the North Central Texas Council of Governments and the chairman of the board of the Mission Metroplex/Mission Arlington.

SJ Stovall died at a nursing home in Mansfield, Texas, on July 14, 2010, at the age of 84. His wife, Mary Margaret "Margie" Stovall, predeceased him. He was survived by a son, Marc, and a daughter, Beth.

== See also ==
- List of mayors of Arlington, Texas
