= Zach Braddock =

American baseball player (born 1987)

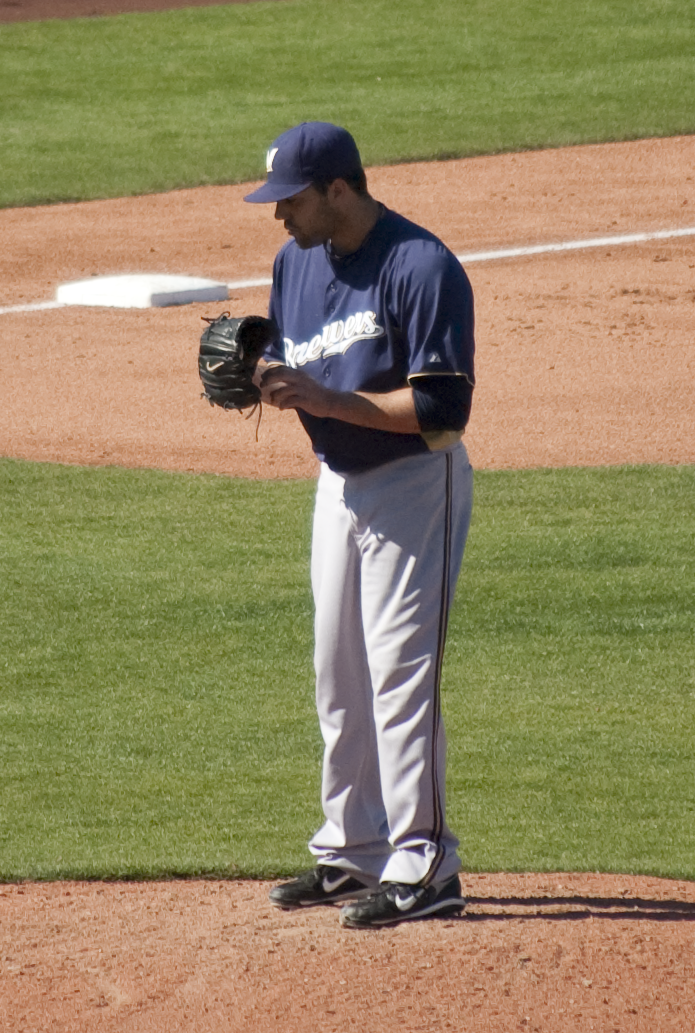
- Braddock with the Milwaukee Brewers
- Pitcher
- Born: August 23, 1987 (age 38); Mount Holly, New Jersey, U.S.
- Batted: Left Threw: Left

MLB debut
- May 23, 2010, for the Milwaukee Brewers

Last appearance
- July 14, 2011, for the Milwaukee Brewers

MLB statistics
- Win–loss record: 1–3
- Earned run average: 4.41
- Strikeouts: 59
- Stats at Baseball Reference

Teams
- Milwaukee Brewers (2010–2011)

William Zachary Braddock (born August 23, 1987) is an American former professional baseball pitcher. He played in Major League Baseball (MLB) for the Milwaukee Brewers.

== Professional career ==
=== Milwaukee Brewers ===
Braddock was drafted by the Milwaukee Brewers in the 18th round of the 2005 Major League Baseball draft out of Gloucester Catholic High School.

A native of Mount Holly Township, Braddock was called up to the majors for the first time on May 23, 2010, and recorded his first Major League win on June 7 of that season.

Braddock did not pitch for the Brewers in 2012 due to personal issues. He was released by Milwaukee following the promotion of Brooks Conrad on May 4, 2012.

=== Baltimore Orioles ===
On December 19, 2012, Braddock was signed to a minor league deal with the Baltimore Orioles and received an invitation to spring training with the big club. He was released by the Orioles on May 24, 2013.

=== Lancaster Barnstormers ===
On August 7, 2013, Braddock signed with the Lancaster Barnstormers of the Atlantic League of Professional Baseball. In 10 appearances for Lancaster, he struggled to an 0-1 record and 12.71 ERA with 8 strikeouts across 5 2/3 innings pitched. Braddock became a free agent following the season.

On January 6, 2014, Braddock signed a minor league contract with the San Diego Padres. He was released prior to the start of the season on March 21.

On June 30, 2014, Braddock signed with the Lancaster Barnstormers of the Atlantic League of Professional Baseball. In 9 games for the Barnstormers, he posted a 2.00 ERA with 10 strikeouts and 1 save over 9 innings of relief. Braddock was released by Lancaster on August 8.

=== Bridgeport Bluefish ===
On August 23, 2014, Braddock signed with the Bridgeport Bluefish of the Atlantic League of Professional Baseball. In 3 starts for the Bluefish, he struggled to an 0-1 record and 10.38 ERA with 7 strikeouts across 8 2/3 innings pitched. Braddock became a free agent following the season.

=== Camden Riversharks ===
On March 24, 2015, Braddock signed with the Camden Riversharks of the Atlantic League of Professional Baseball. In 44 appearances for Camden, he compiled a 4-3 record and 5.36 ERA with 39 strikeouts across 40 1/3 innings pitched. Braddock became a free agent following the season.
