= Mike McClendon =

American baseball player (born 1985)

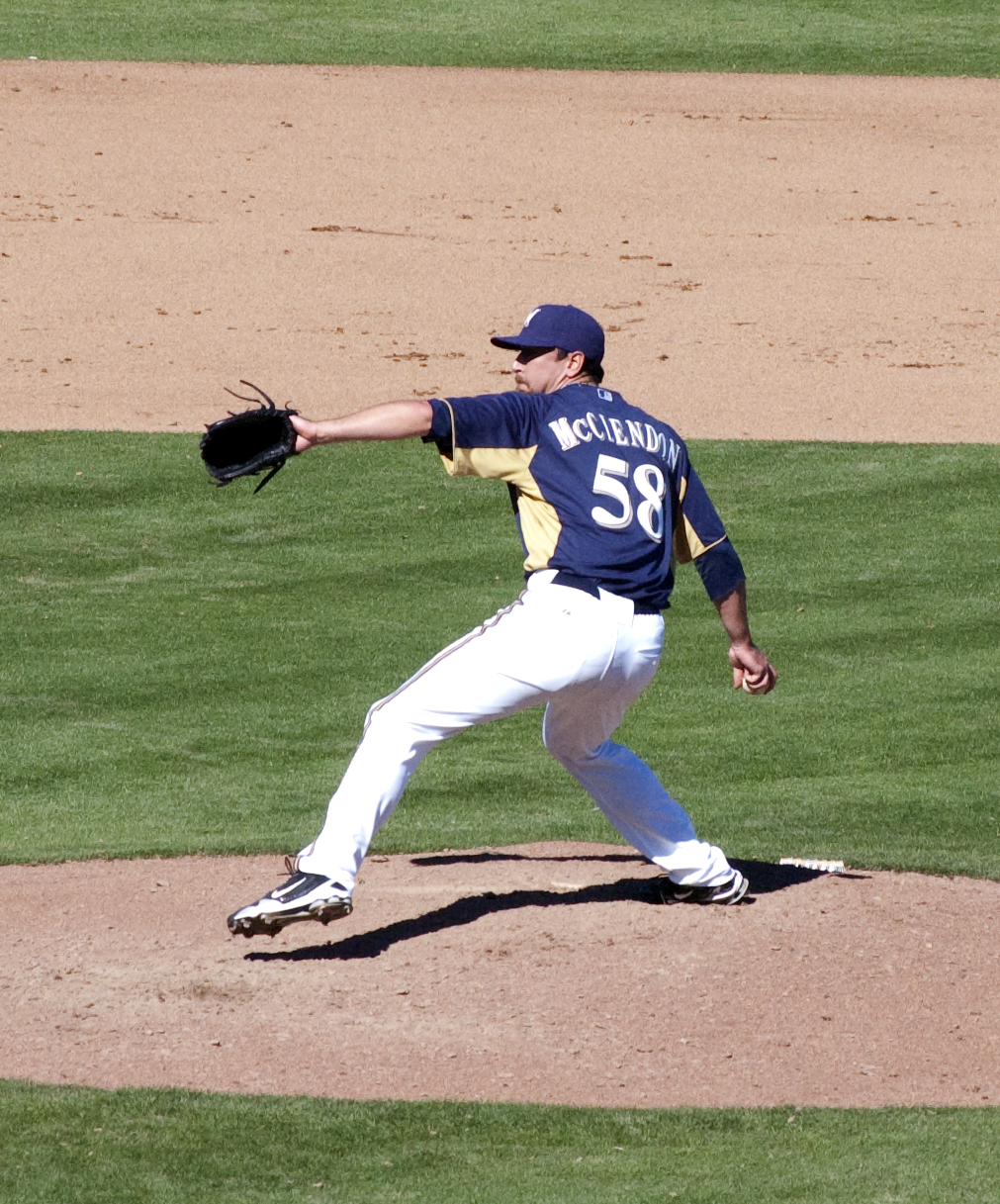
- McClendon with the Milwaukee Brewers
- Pitcher
- Born: April 3, 1985 (age 41); Arlington, Texas, U.S.
- Batted: Right Threw: Right

Professional debut
- MLB: August 14, 2010, for the Milwaukee Brewers
- CPBL: June 2, 2015, for the Brother Elephants

Last appearance
- MLB: August 20, 2012, for the Milwaukee Brewers
- CPBL: September 5, 2015, for the Brother Elephants

MLB statistics
- Win–loss record: 5–0
- Earned run average: 3.88
- Strikeouts: 35

CPBL statistics
- Win–loss record: 10-3
- Earned run average: 3.92
- Strikeouts: 83
- Stats at Baseball Reference

Teams
- Milwaukee Brewers (2010–2012); Brother Elephants (2015)

Michael Melton McClendon (born April 3, 1985) is an American former professional baseball pitcher. He played in Major League Baseball (MLB) for the Milwaukee Brewers from 2010 to 2012 and in the Chinese Professional Baseball League (CPBL) for the Brother Elephants in 2015.

== Career ==
=== Milwaukee Brewers ===
McClendon was drafted by the Brewers in the 10th round of the 2006 amateur entry draft out of Seminole State College of Florida in Sanford, FL after two seasons under head coach Mike Nicholson. In 2006, he made his professional debut for the Rookie League Helena Brewers. In 2007, he was promoted to the Class A West Virginia Power, and then the Class A-Advanced Brevard County Manatees. McClendon played the entire 2008 season with the Manatees. In 2009, he was promoted to the Double-A Huntsville Stars. He played the majority of the 2010 season with Huntsville and the Triple-A Nashville Sounds. On August 12, he was called up to Milwaukee to replace reliever LaTroy Hawkins who was placed on the disabled list. He made his major league debut on August 14, pitching three scoreless innings against the Colorado Rockies, becoming the first ever Brewers pitcher to start a career with at least three perfect innings. He was sent outright to Triple-A Nashville Sounds on August 25, 2012. He became a free agent following the season on November 2.

=== Colorado Rockies ===
On December 12, 2012, McClendon signed a minor league contract with the Colorado Rockies. He became a free agent following the season on November 4, 2013.

He re-signed a new minor league contract with the Rockies on January 27, 2014. He was released on March 27.

=== York Revolution ===
On April 11, 2014, McClendon signed with the York Revolution of the Atlantic League of Professional Baseball. In 7 games (5 starts) he threw 32 innings going 2-2 with a 4.22 ERA and 20 strikeouts.

=== Colorado Rockies (second stint) ===
On June 3, 2014, McClendon signed a minor league contract with the Colorado Rockies. He became a free agent following the season on November 2.

=== York Revolution (second stint) ===
On March 20, 2015, McClendon signed with the York Revolution of the Atlantic League of Professional Baseball. In 4 starts 21.2 innings he went 0-2 with a 4.57 ERA and 17 strikeouts.

=== Brother Elephants ===
On May 23, 2015, McClendon signed with the Brother Elephants of the Chinese Professional Baseball League. He became a free agent following the season.

=== York Revolution (third stint) ===
On April 8, 2016, McClendon signed with the York Revolution of the Atlantic League of Professional Baseball. He became a free agent after the 2016 season. In 6 starts 27.2 innings he struggled going 0-2 with a 5.86 ERA and 17 strikeouts.
