= 2012 Colorado Rockies season =

2012 Colorado Rockies
- League: National League
- Division: West
- Ballpark: Coors Field
- City: Denver, Colorado
- Record: 64–98 (.395)
- Divisional place: 5th
- Owners: Charles & Richard Monfort
- General manager: Dan O'Dowd
- Manager: Jim Tracy
- Television: Root Sports Rocky Mountain (Drew Goodman, George Frazier, Jeff Huson)
- Radio: KOA (English) (Jack Corrigan, Jerry Schemmel); KMXA (Spanish) (Tony Guevara)
- Stats: ESPN.com; Baseball Reference

The Colorado Rockies' 2012 season was the franchise's 20th in Major League Baseball. It involved the Rockies' 18th season of playing their home games at Coors Field.

== Offseason ==
- November 30, 2011: Chris Iannetta was traded by the Colorado Rockies to the Los Angeles Angels of Anaheim for Tyler Chatwood.
- November 30, 2011: Ramón Hernández was signed as a free agent by the Colorado Rockies.
- December 7, 2011: Huston Street was traded by the Colorado Rockies to the San Diego Padres for a player to be named later. The San Diego Padres sent Nick Schmidt (minors) (December 9, 2011) to complete the trade.
- December 8, 2011: Ian Stewart was traded by the Colorado Rockies with Casey Weathers (minors) to the Chicago Cubs for Tyler Colvin and DJ LeMahieu.
- December 16, 2011: Michael Cuddyer was signed as a free agent by the Colorado Rockies.
- January 16, 2012: Seth Smith was traded by the Colorado Rockies to the Oakland Athletics for Guillermo Moscoso and Josh Outman.
- January 18, 2012: Jamie Moyer was signed as a free agent by the Colorado Rockies.
- January 21, 2012: Marco Scutaro was traded by the Boston Red Sox to the Colorado Rockies for Clayton Mortensen.
- February 6, 2012: Jeremy Guthrie was traded by the Baltimore Orioles to the Colorado Rockies for Jason Hammel and Matt Lindstrom.

== Regular season ==
=== Season standings ===
==== NL West standings ====
NL West
Team	W	L	Pct.	GB	Home	Road
San Francisco Giants	94	68	.580	—	48‍–‍33	46‍–‍35
Los Angeles Dodgers	86	76	.531	8	45‍–‍36	41‍–‍40
Arizona Diamondbacks	81	81	.500	13	41‍–‍40	40‍–‍41
San Diego Padres	76	86	.469	18	42‍–‍39	34‍–‍47
Colorado Rockies	64	98	.395	30	35‍–‍46	29‍–‍52

==== NL Wild Card ====
Division leaders
Team	W	L	Pct.
Washington Nationals	98	64	.605
Cincinnati Reds	97	65	.599
San Francisco Giants	94	68	.580

Wild Card teams (Top 2 teams qualify for postseason)
Team	W	L	Pct.	GB
Atlanta Braves	94	68	.580	+6
St. Louis Cardinals	88	74	.543	—
Los Angeles Dodgers	86	76	.531	2
Milwaukee Brewers	83	79	.512	5
Philadelphia Phillies	81	81	.500	7
Arizona Diamondbacks	81	81	.500	7
Pittsburgh Pirates	79	83	.488	9
San Diego Padres	76	86	.469	12
New York Mets	74	88	.457	14
Miami Marlins	69	93	.426	19
Colorado Rockies	64	98	.395	24
Chicago Cubs	61	101	.377	27
Houston Astros	55	107	.340	33

=== Record vs. opponents ===
2012 National League record Source: MLB Standings Grid – 2012
Team	AZ	ATL	CHC	CIN	COL	MIA	HOU	LAD	MIL	NYM	PHI	PIT	SD	SF	STL	WSH	AL
Arizona	–	2–5	5–4	2–5	9–7	5–3	6–0	12–6	3–3	3–4	2–4	3–4	7–11	9–9	1–5	2–4	9–6
Atlanta	5–2	–	3–4	1–5	6–1	14–4	4–2	3–3	3–3	12–6	12–6	3–4	4–3	3–4	5–1	8–10	8–10
Chicago	4–5	4–3	–	4–12	2–4	8–5	2–4	2–4	4–13	4–2	2–4	8–8	3–3	1–6	7–10	1–6	5–10
Cincinnati	5–2	5–1	12–4	–	5–1	10–5	2–4	3–3	9–6	6–2	3–4	11–7	6–2	4–3	6–7	2–5	7–8
Colorado	7–9	1–6	4–2	1–5	–	5–2	5–2	8–10	5–1	5–2	2–7	2–4	8–10	4–14	2–5	4–3	2–13
Houston	0–6	2–4	5–8	5–10	2–5	–	2–4	2–4	8–9	4–2	3–3	5–12	3–5	1–8	4–11	1–7	6–9
Los Angeles	6–12	3–3	4–2	4–2	10–8	4–2	–	4–2	1–6	4–3	5–2	6–1	11–7	8–10	6–5	4–2	6–9
Miami	3–5	4–14	4–2	3–3	4–3	–	4–2	2–4	4–4	4–12	8–10	1–4	5–1	5–2	2–5	9–9	5–13
Milwaukee	3–3	3–3	13–4	6–9	1–5	9–8	6–1	4–4	–	3–2	2–5	11–4	3–4	2–4	6–9	3–5	6–9
New York	4–3	6–12	2–4	2–6	2–5	2–4	3–4	12–4	2–3	–	10–8	5–2	4–3	4–4	4–3	4–14	8–7
Philadelphia	4–2	6–12	4–2	4–3	7–2	10–8	3–3	2–5	5–2	8–10	–	3–4	4–3	2–4	5–2	9–9	5–10
Pittsburgh	4–3	2–3	8–8	7–11	4–2	4–1	12–5	1–6	4–11	2–5	4–3	–	1–5	3–3	8–7	3–2	10–8
San Diego	11–7	3–4	3–3	2–6	10–8	5–3	7–11	1–5	4–3	3–4	3–4	5–1	–	6–12	3–3	2–3	8–7
San Francisco	9–9	4–3	6–1	3–4	14–4	2–5	8–1	10–8	4–2	4–4	4–2	3–3	12–6	–	3–3	1–5	7–8
St. Louis	5–1	1–5	10–7	7–6	5–2	11–4	5–6	5–2	9–6	3–4	3–4	7–8	3–3	3–3	–	3–4	8–7
Washington	4–2	10–8	6–1	5–2	3–4	7–1	2–4	9–9	5–3	14–4	9–9	2–3	3–2	5–1	4–3	–	10–8

=== Transactions ===
- June 4, 2012: Jamie Moyer was released by the Colorado Rockies.
- June 8, 2012: Jeff Francis was signed as a free agent by the Colorado Rockies.
- June 12, 2012: Esmil Rogers was sold by the Colorado Rockies to the Cleveland Indians.
- July 20, 2012: Jeremy Guthrie was traded by the Colorado Rockies to the Kansas City Royals for Jonathan Sánchez.
- July 27, 2012: Marco Scutaro was traded by the Colorado Rockies to the San Francisco Giants for Charlie Culberson.

=== Major League Debuts ===
- Batters
  - Josh Rutledge (Jul 13)
  - Matt McBride (Aug 4)
  - Rafael Ortega (Sep 30)
- Pitchers
  - Christian Friedrich (May 9)
  - Edwar Cabrera (Jun 27)
  - Will Harris (Aug 13)
  - Rob Scahill (Sep 11)

=== Roster ===
2012 Colorado Rockies
**Roster**
**Pitchers**: 34 Matt Belisle; 63 Rafael Betancourt; 49 Rex Brothers; 46 Edwar Cabrera; 45 Jhoulys Chacín; 32 Tyler Chatwood; 29 Jorge de la Rosa; 47 Mike Ekstrom; 61 Edgmer Escalona; 26 Jeff Francis; 53 Christian Friedrich; 15 Jeremy Guthrie; 48 Will Harris; 56 Guillermo Moscoso; 50 Jamie Moyer; 44 Juan Nicasio; 37 Adam Ottavino; 88 Josh Outman; 13 Drew Pomeranz; 54 Zach Putnam; 51 Matt Reynolds; 30 Josh Roenicke; 48 Esmil Rogers; 35 Jonathan Sánchez; 62 Rob Scahill; 59 Carlos Torres; 6 Alex White	**Catchers**: 55 Ramón Hernández; 41 Wil Nieves; 20 Wilin Rosario; **Infielders**: 36 Tommy Field; 23 Jason Giambi; 17 Todd Helton; 18 Jonathan Herrera; 9 DJ LeMahieu; 7 Matt McBride; 10 Chris Nelson; 22 Jordan Pacheco; 14 Josh Rutledge; 19 Marco Scutaro; 2 Troy Tulowitzki; **Outfielders**: 8 Charlie Blackmon; 12 Andrew Brown; 21 Tyler Colvin; 3 Michael Cuddyer; 24 Dexter Fowler; 5 Carlos González; 47 Rafael Ortega; 1 Eric Young, Jr.	**Manager**: 4 Jim Tracy; **Coaches**: 36 Bob Apodaca (pitching); 25 Rich Dauer (third base); 31 Glenallen Hill (first base); 43 Carney Lansford (hitting); 40 Bo McLaughlin (pitching); 11 Tom Runnells (bench); 52 Jim Wright (pitching/bullpen)

=== Game log ===
Legend
	Rockies win
	Rockies loss
	Postponement
**Bold**	Rockies team member

2012 Game Log
April (11–11)

#	Date	Opponent	Score	Win	Loss	Save	Attendance	Record
1	April 6	@ Astros	5–3	**Guthrie** (1–0)	Rodriguez (0–1)	**Betancourt** (1)	43,464	1–0
2	April 7	@ Astros	7–3	Harrell (1–0)	**Moyer** (0–1)		23,962	1–1
3	April 8	@ Astros	3–2	López (1–0)	**Brothers** (0–1)	Myers (1)	14,195	1–2
4	April 9	Giants	7–0	Zito (1–0)	**Chacín** (0–1)		49,282	1–3
5	April 11	Giants	17–8	**Reynolds** (1–0)	Mota (0–1)	**Chatwood** (1)	30,337	2–3
6	April 12	Giants	4–2	Bumgarner (1–1)	**Moyer** (0–2)	Wilson (1)	25,860	2–4
7	April 13	Diamondbacks	7–6	**Brothers** (1–1)	Shaw (0–1)	**Betancourt** (2)	30,642	3–4
8	April 14	Diamondbacks	8–7	**Chatwood** (1–0)	Putz (0–1)		29,856	4–4
9	April 15	Diamondbacks	5–2	Cahill (1–0)	**Pomeranz** (0–1)	Shaw (2)	26,952	4–5
10	April 16	Padres	7–1	Luebke (1–1)	**Guthrie** (1–1)		21,547	4–6
11	April 17	Padres	5–3	**Moyer** (1–2)	Bass (0–2)	**Betancourt** (3)	24,525	5–6
12	April 18	Padres	8–4	**Nicasio** (1–0)	Richard (1–1)		24,762	6–6
13	April 20	@ Brewers	4–3	**Belisle** (1–0)	Axford (0–1)	**Betancourt** (4)	39,188	7–6
14	April 21	@ Brewers	9–4	Veras (2–0)	**Rogers** (0–1)		43,565	7–7
15	April 22	@ Brewers	4–1	**Guthrie** (2–1)	Rodríguez (0–2)	**Betancourt** (5)	42,611	8–7
–	April 23	@ Pirates	Postponed (rain) Rescheduled for April 25					
16	April 24	@ Pirates	5–4	Watson (1–0)	**Belisle** (1–1)	Hanrahan (3)	10,484	8–8
17	April 25	@ Pirates	2–1	**Reynolds** (2–0)	Resop (0–2)	**Betancourt** (6)		9–8
18	April 25	@ Pirates	5–1	Morton (1–1)	**Chacín** (0–2)		15,218	9–9
19	April 27	Mets	18–9	**Reynolds** (3–0)	Acosta (0–1)		35,103	10–9
20	April 28	Mets	7–5	Gee (2–2)	**Moscoso** (0–1)	Francisco (5)	38,798	10–10
21	April 29	Mets	6–5 (11)	Francisco (1–1)	**Belisle** (1–2)	Ramírez (1)	36,690	10–11
22	April 30	Dodgers	6–2	**Nicasio** (2–0)	Harang (1–2)		25,227	11–11

May (10–18)

#	Date	Opponent	Score	Win	Loss	Save	Attendance	Record
23	May 1	Dodgers	7–6	Lilly (3–0)	**Chacín** (0–3)	Guerra (8)	26,211	11–12
24	May 2	Dodgers	8–5	**Betancourt** (1–0)	Wright (1–1)		30,276	12–12
25	May 4	Braves	9–8 (11)	Durbin (2–0)	**Escalona** (0–1)	Kimbrel (9)	33,184	12–13
26	May 5	Braves	13–9	Martínez (2–0)	**Rogers** (0–2)	Hernández (1)	40,013	12–14
27	May 6	Braves	7–2	Beachy (3–1)	**Nicasio** (2–1)	Martínez (1)	45,330	12–15
28	May 7	@ Padres	3–2	Vólquez (1–2)	**Pomeranz** (0–2)	Thayer (1)	15,895	12–16
29	May 8	@ Padres	3–1	Suppan (2–0)	**White** (0–1)	Thayer (2)	17,478	12–17
30	May 9	@ Padres	6–2	**Friedrich** (1–0)	Bass (1–4)		20,059	13–17
31	May 11	@ Dodgers	7–3	Capuano (5–0)	**Moyer** (1–3)		35,591	13–18
32	May 12	@ Dodgers	2–1	Harang (2–2)	**Outman** (0–1)	Jansen (3)	33,735	13–19
33	May 13	@ Dodgers	11–5	Lilly (5–0)	**White** (0–2)		49,124	13–20
34	May 14	@ Giants	3–2	Romo (2–0)	**Brothers** (1–2)	Casilla (8)	41,254	13–21
35	May 15	@ Giants	5–4	**Brothers** (2–2)	Casilla (0–2)	**Betancourt** (7)	41,332	14–21
36	May 16	Diamondbacks	6–1	**Moyer** (2–3)	Corbin (2–2)		32,162	15–21
37	May 17	Diamondbacks	9–7	Ziegler (2–1)	**Betancourt** (1–1)	Putz (7)	32,035	15–22
38	May 18	Mariners	4–0	Millwood (2–4)	**White** (0–3)		34,887	15–23
39	May 19	Mariners	10–3	Vargas (5–3)	**Friedrich** (1–1)		30,784	15–24
40	May 20	Mariners	6–4	Beavan (2–4)	**Guthrie** (2–2)		36,662	15–25
41	May 21	@ Marlins	7–4	Buehrle (4–4)	**Moyer** (2–4)	Bell (6)	25,155	15–26
42	May 22	@ Marlins	7–6	Nolasco (5–2)	**Nicasio** (2–2)	Bell (7)	22,242	15–27
43	May 23	@ Marlins	8–4	**White** (1–3)	Zambrano (2–3)		23,985	16–27
44	May 25	@ Reds	6–3	**Friedrich** (2–1)	Cueto (5–2)	**Betancourt** (8)	29,597	17–27
45	May 26	@ Reds	10–3	Hoover (1–0)	**Guthrie** (2–3)		35,314	17–28
46	May 27	@ Reds	7–5	Latos (4–2)	**Moyer** (2–5)	Chapman (3)	29,368	17–29
47	May 28	Astros	9–7	**Belisle** (2–2)	Rodriguez (1–5)	**Betancourt** (9)	34,546	18–29
48	May 28	Astros	7–6 (10)	**Roenicke** (1–0)	Myers (0–2)		35,786	19–29
49	May 30	Astros	13–5	**Friedrich** (3–1)	Harrell (4–4)		28,102	20–29
50	May 31	Astros	11–5	**Guthrie** (3–3)	Norris (5–2)		31,799	21–29

June (9–18)

#	Date	Opponent	Score	Win	Loss	Save	Attendance	Record
51	June 1	Dodgers	13–3	**Ottavino** (1–0)	Capuano (7–2)		36,795	22–29
52	June 2	Dodgers	6–2	Harang (4–3)	**Nicasio** (2–3)		36,175	22–30
53	June 3	Dodgers	3–2	**White** (2–3)	Eovaldi (0–2)	**Betancourt** (10)	35,353	23–30
54	June 5	@ Diamondbacks	4–0	**Friedrich** (4–1)	Saunders (3–4)		22,881	24–30
55	June 6	@ Diamondbacks	10–0	Kennedy (5–5)	**Guthrie** (3–4)		22,322	24–31
56	June 7	@ Diamondbacks	6–1	Miley (7–2)	**Outman** (0–2)		23,069	24–32
57	June 8	Angels	7–2	Wilson (7–4)	**White** (2–4)		41,814	24–33
58	June 9	Angels	11–5	Haren (4–6)	**Francis** (0–1)		37,801	24–34
59	June 10	Angels	10–8	Santana (3–7)	**Friedrich** (4–2)	Downs (6)	37,722	24–35
60	June 12	Athletics	8–5	Colón (6–6)	**Guthrie** (3–5)	Cook (1)	33,635	24–36
61	June 13	Athletics	10–8	Blevins (1–0)	**Betancourt** (1–2)	Cook (2)	32,155	24–37
62	June 14	Athletics	8–2	Parker (3–3)	**White** (2–5)		32,527	24–38
63	June 15	@ Tigers	12–4 (10)	**Belisle** (3–2)	Valverde (3–2)		41,878	25–38
64	June 16	@ Tigers	4–1	Fister (1–3)	**Friedrich** (4–3)		41,800	25–39
65	June 17	@ Tigers	5–0	Scherzer (6–4)	**Guthrie** (3–6)		40,619	25–40
66	June 19	@ Phillies	7–2	Hamels (10–3)	**Outman** (0–3)		44,329	25–41
67	June 20	@ Phillies	7–6	Papelbon (1–2)	**Betancourt** (1–3)		43,729	25–42
68	June 21	@ Phillies	4–1	**Roenicke** (2–0)	Worley (3–4)	**Betancourt** (11)	43,805	26–42
69	June 22	@ Rangers	4–1	Oswalt (1–0)	**Friedrich** (4–4)	Nathan (16)	46,964	26–43
70	June 23	@ Rangers	11–7	**Brothers** (3–2)	Lewis (6–6)		42,516	27–43
71	June 24	@ Rangers	4–2	Harrison (10–3)	**White** (2–6)		45,407	27–44
72	June 25	Nationals	4–2	**Roenicke** (3–0)	Strasburg (9–2)	**Betancourt** (12)	40,177	28–44
73	June 26	Nationals	12–5	Gonzalez (10–3)	**Friedrich** (4–5)		36,110	28–45
74	June 27	Nationals	11–5	Zimmermann (4–6)	**Cabrera** (0–1)		36,045	28–46
75	June 28	Nationals	11–10 (11)	**Ottavino** (2–0)	Stammen (3–1)		33,957	29–46
76	June 29	Padres	10–2	**Francis** (1–1)	Marquis (3–8)		42,785	30–46
77	June 30	Padres	8–4	Vólquez (5–7)	**Guthrie** (3–7)		48,169	30–47

July (7–17)

#	Date	Opponent	Score	Win	Loss	Save	Attendance	Record
78	July 1	Padres	2–0	Wells (1–1)	**Pomeranz** (0–3)	Street (12)	31,829	30–48
79	July 2	@ Cardinals	9–3	Lohse (8–2)	**Chatwood** (1–1)		39,456	30–49
80	July 3	@ Cardinals	3–2	**Francis** (2–1)	Kelly (1–1)	**Betancourt** (13)	41,701	31–49
81	July 4	@ Cardinals	4–1	Wainwright (7–8)	**Guthrie** (3–8)	Motte (18)	42,338	31–50
82	July 5	@ Cardinals	6–2	Lynn (11–4)	**Friedrich** (4–6)	Motte (19)	41,751	31–51
83	July 6	@ Nationals	5–1	**Pomeranz** (1–3)	Strasburg (9–4)	**Betancourt** (14)	28,951	32–51
84	July 7	@ Nationals	4–1	Gonzalez (12–3)	**Francis** (2–2)	Clippard (14)	28,032	32–52
85	July 8	@ Nationals	4–3	**Brothers** (4–2)	Clippard (2–3)	**Betancourt** (15)	25,125	33–52
86	July 13	Phillies	6–2	**Friedrich** (5–6)	Lee (1–6)		33,346	34–52
87	July 14	Phillies	8–5	Worley (5–5)	**Guthrie** (3–9)	Papelbon (19)	35,151	34–53
88	July 15	Phillies	5–1	Hamels (11–4)	**Pomeranz** (1–4)		25,685	34–54
89	July 16	Pirates	5–4	**Brothers** (5–2)	Grilli (1–3)		36,907	35–54
90	July 17	Pirates	6–2	Bédard (5–10)	**Friedrich** (5–7)	Hanrahan (25)	42,574	35–55
91	July 18	Pirates	9–6	McDonald (10–3)	**Reynolds** (3–1)	Hanrahan (26)	30,842	35–56
92	July 20	@ Padres	9–5	Marquis (5–9)	**Pomeranz** (1–5)		25,507	35–57
93	July 21	@ Padres	8–6 (12)	**Torres** (1–0)	Thatcher (0–3)	**Betancourt** (16)	37,174	36–57
94	July 22	@ Padres	3–2	Thayer (2–2)	**Ottavino** (2–1)	Street (16)	25,198	36–58
95	July 23	@ Diamondbacks	6–3	Kennedy (8–8)	**Sánchez** (1–7)	Putz (18)	20,056	36–59
96	July 24	@ Diamondbacks	6–2	Saunders (5–6)	**Cabrera** (0–2)		20,432	36–60
97	July 25	@ Diamondbacks	4–2	**Francis** (3–2)	Cahill (8–9)	**Betancourt** (17)	23,385	37–60
98	July 27	Reds	3–0	Arroyo (6–6)	**Pomeranz** (1–6)	Chapman (20)	38,214	37–61
99	July 28	Reds	9–7	Cueto (13–5)	**Friedrich** (5–8)	Chapman (21)	42,826	37–62
100	July 29	Reds	7–2	Latos (9–3)	**Sánchez** (1–8)		29,430	37–63
101	July 31	Cardinals	11–6	Lohse (11–2)	**Francis** (3–3)		31,297	37–64

August (16–13)

#	Date	Opponent	Score	Win	Loss	Save	Attendance	Record
102	August 1	Cardinals	9–6	Westbrook (10–8)	**Belisle** (3–3)		29,547	37–65
103	August 2	Cardinals	8–2	**Brothers** (6–2)	Salas (1–4)		29,659	38–65
104	August 3	Giants	16–4	Vogelsong (9–5)	**Sánchez** (1–9)		30,176	38–66
105	August 4	Giants	11–6	Bumgarner (12–6)	**Francis** (3–4)		35,242	38–67
106	August 5	Giants	8–3	Lincecum (6–11)	**Chatwood** (1–2)		28,804	38–68
107	August 6	@ Dodgers	2–0	**Ottavino** (3–1)	Capuano (10–8)	**Betancourt** (18)	32,659	39–68
108	August 7	@ Dodgers	3–1	**Roenicke** (4–0)	Harang (7–7)	**Betancourt** (19)	55,024	40–68
109	August 8	@ Dodgers	6–4	Billingsley (8–9)	**Torres** (1–1)	Jansen (22)	37,084	40–69
110	August 10	@ Giants	3–0	**Chatwood** (2–2)	Lincecum (6–12)	**Betancourt** (20)	41,729	41–69
111	August 11	@ Giants	9–3	Cain (11–5)	**Pomeranz** (1–7)		42,483	41–70
112	August 12	@ Giants	9–6	Hensley (4–3)	**Belisle** (3–4)		41,492	41–71
113	August 13	Brewers	9–6	**Francis** (4–4)	Fiers (6–5)		26,821	42–71
114	August 14	Brewers	8–6	**Chatwood** (3–2)	Wolf (3–9)	**Betancourt** (21)	28,036	43–71
115	August 15	Brewers	7–6	**Harris** (1–0)	Henderson (0–2)		23,411	44–71
116	August 16	Marlins	5–3	**Ottavino** (4–1)	Nolasco (9–12)	**Betancourt** (22)	24,807	45–71
117	August 17	Marlins	6–5	LeBlanc (2–2)	**Roenicke** (4–1)	Cishek (8)	25,614	45–72
118	August 18	Marlins	6–5	Eovaldi (4–8)	**Chatwood** (3–3)	Cishek (9)	30,426	45–73
119	August 19	Marlins	3–2	**Ottavino** (5–1)	Johnson (7–10)	**Betancourt** (23)	43,961	46–73
120	August 20	@ Mets	3–1	**Brothers** (7–2)	Edgin (1–1)	**Betancourt** (24)	23,833	47–73
121	August 21	@ Mets	6–2	**Chacín** (1–3)	Young (3–7)		27,633	48–73
122	August 22	@ Mets	5–2	**Torres** (2–1)	Ramírez (2–3)	**Betancourt** (25)	22,204	49–73
123	August 23	@ Mets	1–0	**Brothers** (8–2)	Parnell (2–3)	**Belisle** (1)	22,544	50–73
124	August 24	@ Cubs	5–3	Russell (6–1)	**Belisle** (3–5)	Mármol (16)	31,255	50–74
125	August 25	@ Cubs	4–3	**Torres** (3–1)	Corpas (0–1)	**Betancourt** (26)	35,296	51–74
126	August 26	@ Cubs	5–0 (8)	Volstad (1–9)	**Chacín** (1–4)	Camp (2)	32,346	51–75
127	August 27	Dodgers	10–0	**Francis** (5–4)	Beckett (5–12)	**Belisle** (2)	30,148	52–75
128	August 28	Dodgers	8–4	**Chatwood** (4–3)	Capuano (11–10)		28,368	53–75
129	August 29	Dodgers	10–8	Blanton (9–12)	**Pomeranz** (1–8)	Belisario (1)	25,155	53–76
130	August 31	Padres	5–4	Richard (12–12)	**White** (2–7)	Gregerson (3)	27,366	53–77

September (9–20)

#	Date	Opponent	Score	Win	Loss	Save	Attendance	Record
131	September 1	Padres	9–1	**Chacín** (2–4)	Vólquez (9–10)		30,152	54–77
132	September 2	Padres	11–10	**Moscoso** (1–1)	Brach (1–4)	**Betancourt** (27)	30,678	55–77
133	September 3	@ Braves	6–1	Medlen (7–1)	**Chatwood** (4–4)		24,848	55–78
134	September 4	@ Braves	6–0	**Torres** (4–1)	Hanson (12–8)		16,686	56–78
135	September 5	@ Braves	1–0	Minor (8–10)	**White** (2–8)	Kimbrel (33)	16,714	56–79
136	September 6	@ Braves	1–0	Hudson (14–5)	**Chacín** (2–5)	Kimbrel (34)	19,313	56–80
137	September 7	@ Phillies	3–2	Papelbon (4–6)	**Harris** (1–1)		42,028	56–81
–	September 8	@ Phillies	Postponed (rain) Rescheduled for September 9					
138	September 9	@ Phillies	3–2	Papelbon (5–6)	**Belisle** (3–6)		41,813	56–82
139	September 9	@ Phillies	7–4	Rosenberg (1–2)	**Roenicke** (4–2)	Papelbon (32)	40,394	56–83
140	September 10	Giants	6–5	**Moscoso** (2–1)	Vogelsong (12–8)	**Betancourt** (28)	25,817	57–83
141	September 11	Giants	9–8	Kontos (2–1)	**Torres** (4–2)	López (7)	26,631	57–84
142	September 12	Giants	8–3	Lincecum (9–14)	**Francis** (5–5)		24,182	57–85
143	September 14	@ Padres	7–4	**Moscoso** (3–1)	Cashner (3–4)	**Betancourt** (29)	25,018	58–85
144	September 15	@ Padres	4–3	Kelly (2–1)	**Pomeranz** (1–9)	Gregerson (8)	27,651	58–86
145	September 16	@ Padres	12–11	Thatcher (1–4)	**Belisle** (3–7)		22,948	58–87
146	September 17	@ Giants	2–1	Bumgarner (15–10)	**Moscoso** (3–2)	Romo (12)	41,280	58–88
147	September 18	@ Giants	6–3	Lincecum (10–14)	**Francis** (5–6)		41,718	58–89
148	September 19	@ Giants	7–1	Cain (15–5)	**Chatwood** (4–5)		41,292	58–90
149	September 20	@ Giants	9–2	Zito (13–8)	**de la Rosa** (0–1)		41,157	58–91
150	September 21	Diamondbacks	15–5	Miley (16–10)	**White** (2–9)		42,359	58–92
151	September 22	Diamondbacks	8–7	Bergesen (2–0)	**Torres** (4–3)	Putz (31)	33,689	58–93
152	September 23	Diamondbacks	10–7	Albers (3–1)	**Belisle** (3–8)	Putz (32)	32,448	58–94
153	September 24	Diamondbacks	4–2	**Chatwood** (5–5)	Cahill (12–12)	**Betancourt** (30)	22,277	59–94
154	September 25	Cubs	10–5 (7)	**Torres** (5–3)	Rusin (1–3)		26,660	60–94
155	September 26	Cubs	6–0	**Pomeranz** (2–9)	Berken (0–2)		27,057	61–94
156	September 27	Cubs	7–5	**Chacín** (3–5)	Volstad (3–11)	**Betancourt** (31)	30,288	62–94
157	September 28	@ Dodgers	8–0	Kershaw (13–9)	**Francis** (5–7)		37,133	62–95
158	September 29	@ Dodgers	3–0	Blanton (10–13)	**Chatwood** (5–6)	League (15)	40,724	62–96
159	September 30	@ Dodgers	7–1	Beckett (7–14)	**de la Rosa** (0–2)		35,607	62–97

October (2–1)

#	Date	Opponent	Score	Win	Loss	Save	Attendance	Record
160	October 1	@ Diamondbacks	7–5 (13)	**Outman** (1–3)	Bergesen (2–1)	**Roenicke** (1)	24,123	63–97
161	October 2	@ Diamondbacks	5–3	Ziegler (6–1)	**Betancourt** (1–4)		22,466	63–98
162	October 3	@ Diamondbacks	2–1	**Francis** (6–7)	Kennedy (15–12)	**Belisle** (3)	24,344	64–98

== Player stats ==
= Indicates team leader

=== Batting ===
==== Starters by position ====
Note: Pos = Position; G = Games played; AB = At bats; H = Hits; Avg. = Batting average; HR = Home runs; RBI = Runs batted in

Pos	Player	G	AB	H	Avg.	HR	RBI
C	Wilin Rosario	117	396	107	.270	28	71
1B	Todd Helton	69	240	57	.238	7	37
2B	Marco Scutaro	95	377	102	.271	4	30
SS	Josh Rutledge	73	277	76	.274	8	37
3B	Jordan Pacheco	132	475	147	.309	5	54
LF	Carlos González	135	518	157	.303	22	85
CF	Dexter Fowler	143	454	136	.300	13	53
RF	Michael Cuddyer	101	358	93	.260	16	58

==== Other batters ====
Note: G = Games played; AB = At bats; H = Hits; Avg. = Batting average; HR = Home runs; RBI = Runs batted in

Player	G	AB	H	Avg.	HR	RBI
Tyler Colvin	136	420	122	.290	18	72
Chris Nelson	111	345	104	.301	9	53
DJ LeMahieu	81	229	68	.297	2	22
Jonathan Herrera	86	225	59	.262	3	12
Ramón Hernández	52	184	40	.217	5	28
Troy Tulowitzki	47	181	52	.287	8	27
Eric Young, Jr.	98	174	55	.316	4	15
Charlie Blackmon	42	113	32	.283	2	9
Andrew Brown	46	112	26	.232	5	11
Jason Giambi	60	89	20	.225	1	8
Matt McBride	31	78	16	.205	2	11
Wil Nieves	16	47	14	.298	1	5
Rafael Ortega	2	4	2	.500	0	0
Tommy Field	2	2	0	.000	0	0

=== Pitching ===
==== Starting pitchers ====
Note: G = Games pitched; IP = Innings pitched; W = Wins; L = Losses; ERA = Earned run average; SO = Strikeouts

Player	G	IP	W	L	ERA	SO
Jeff Francis	24	113.0	6	7	5.58	76
Alex White	23	98.0	2	9	5.51	64
Drew Pomeranz	22	96.2	2	9	4.93	83
Jeremy Guthrie	19	90.2	3	9	6.35	45
Christian Friedrich	16	84.2	5	8	6.17	74
Jhoulys Chacín	14	69.0	3	5	4.43	45
Juan Nicasio	11	58.0	2	3	5.28	54
Jamie Moyer	10	53.2	2	5	5.70	36
Jonathan Sánchez	3	11.1	0	3	9.53	9
Jorge De La Rosa	3	10.2	0	2	9.28	6
Edwar Cabrera	2	5.2	0	2	11.12	5

==== Other pitchers ====
Note: G = Games pitched; IP = Innings pitched; W = Wins; L = Losses; ERA = Earned run average; SO = Strikeouts

Player	G	IP	W	L	ERA	SO
Tyler Chatwood	19	64.2	5	6	5.43	41
Josh Outman	27	40.2	1	3	8.19	40

==== Relief pitchers ====
Note: G = Games pitched; W = Wins; L = Losses; SV = Saves; ERA = Earned run average; SO = Strikeouts

Player	G	W	L	SV	ERA	SO
Rafael Betancourt	60	1	4	31	2.81	57
Matt Belisle	80	3	8	3	3.71	69
Rex Brothers	75	8	2	0	3.86	83
Matt Reynolds	71	3	1	0	4.40	51
Josh Roenicke	63	4	2	1	3.25	54
Adam Ottavino	53	5	1	0	4.56	81
Carlos Torres	31	5	3	0	5.26	42
Guillermo Moscoso	23	3	2	0	6.12	47
Esmil Rogers	23	0	2	0	8.06	29
Edgmer Escalona	22	0	1	0	6.04	21
Will Harris	20	1	1	0	8.15	19
Mike Ekstrom	15	0	0	0	6.32	9
Rob Scahill	6	0	0	0	1.04	4
Zach Putnam	2	0	0	0	0.00	0

== Farm system ==
Level	Team	League	Manager
AAA	Colorado Springs Sky Sox	Pacific Coast League	Stu Cole
AA	Tulsa Drillers	Texas League	Duane Espy
A	Modesto Nuts	California League	Lenn Sakata
A	Asheville Tourists	South Atlantic League	Joe Mikulik
A-Short Season	Tri-City Dust Devils	Northwest League	Fred Ocasio
Rookie	Grand Junction Rockies	Pioneer League	Tony Diaz

LEAGUE CHAMPIONS: Asheville

Records
Preceded by 2011	Colorado Rockies seasons 2012	Succeeded by 2013
