= Roenicke =

Roenicke is a surname. Notable people with the surname include:

- Gary Roenicke (born 1954), American baseball player
- Josh Roenicke (born 1982), American baseball player, son of Gary
- Ron Roenicke (born 1956), American baseball player, coach, and manager, brother of Gary
