= Collin Cowgill =

American baseball player (born 1986)

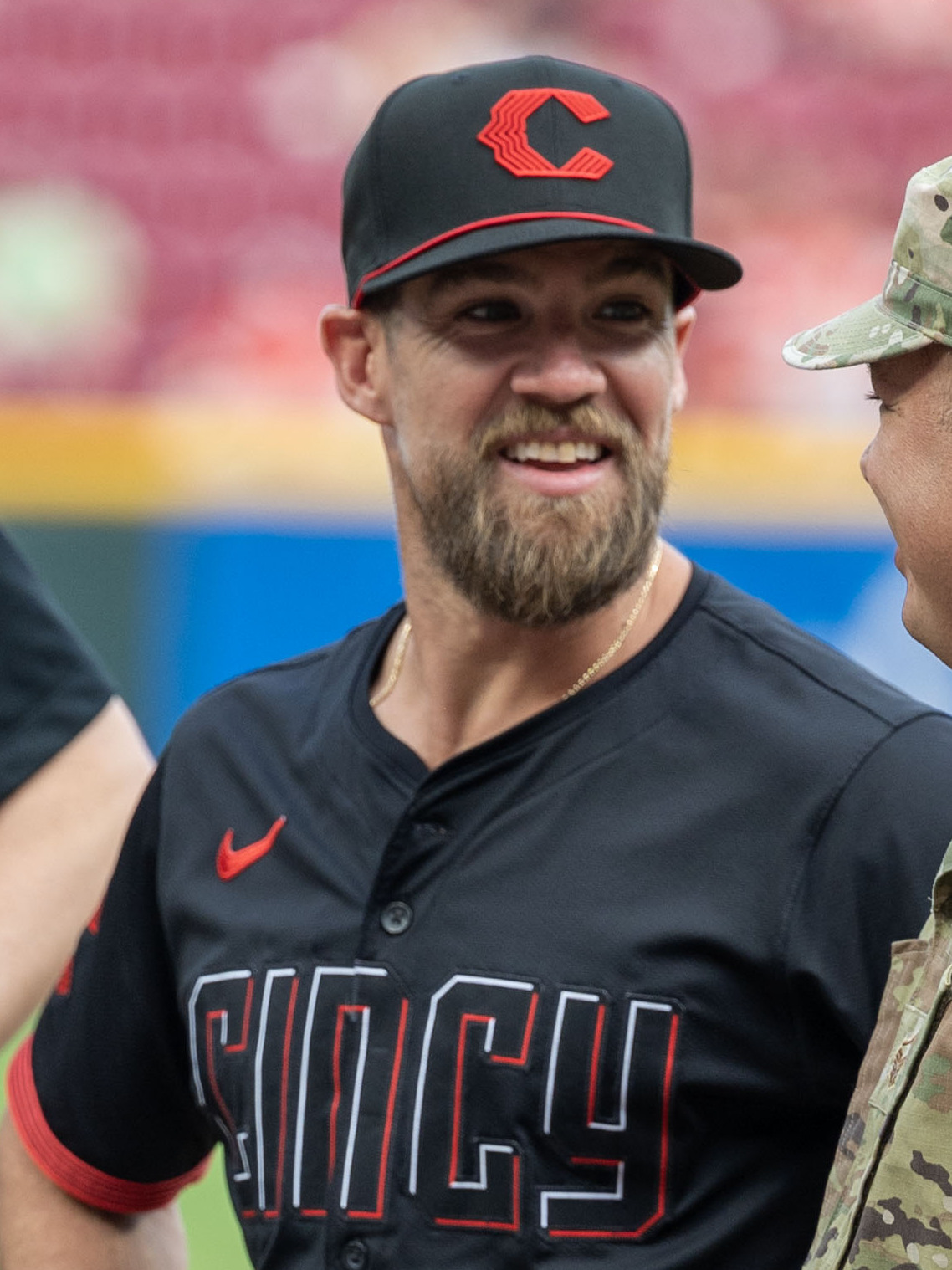
- Cowgill with the Cincinnati Reds in 2024

Cincinnati Reds – No. 54
- Outfielder / Coach
- Born: May 22, 1986 (age 40); Lexington, Kentucky, U.S.
- Batted: Right Threw: Left

MLB debut
- July 26, 2011, for the Arizona Diamondbacks

Last MLB appearance
- April 19, 2016, for the Cleveland Indians

MLB statistics
- Batting average: .234
- Home runs: 12
- Runs batted in: 57
- Stats at Baseball Reference

Teams
- As player: Arizona Diamondbacks (2011); Oakland Athletics (2012); New York Mets (2013); Los Angeles Angels of Anaheim (2013–2015); Cleveland Indians (2016); As coach: Cincinnati Reds (2023–present)

Collin Brannen Cowgill (born May 22, 1986) is an American professional baseball coach and former outfielder who is the first base coach for the Cincinnati Reds of Major League Baseball (MLB). He played six seasons in MLB for the Arizona Diamondbacks, Oakland Athletics, New York Mets, Los Angeles Angels of Anaheim, and Cleveland Indians from 2011 to 2016. He played college baseball for the Kentucky Wildcats, and served as manager of the Arkansas Travelers, the Double-A affiliate of the Seattle Mariners, from 2021 to 2022.

== Amateur career ==
Cowgill attended Henry Clay High School in Lexington, Kentucky. He then enrolled at the University of Kentucky, where he played college baseball for the Kentucky Wildcats baseball team. In his final season at Kentucky, he was named a third-team All-American by Rivals. In 2006, he played collegiate summer baseball in the Cape Cod Baseball League for the Brewster Whitecaps, and returned to the league in 2007 to play for the Yarmouth-Dennis Red Sox where he was named a league all-star.

== Professional career ==
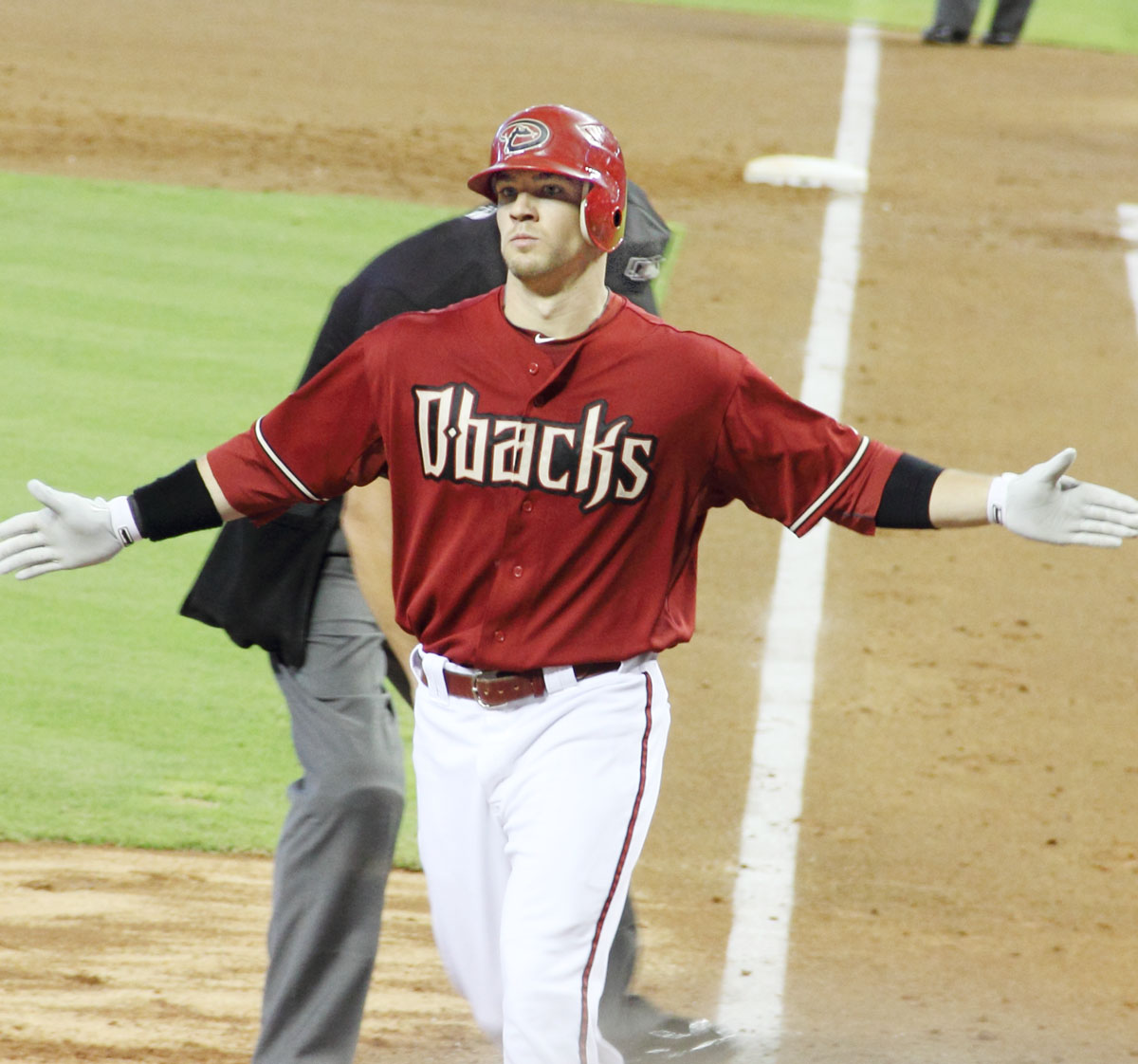
Cowgill in 2011

=== Arizona Diamondbacks ===
The Arizona Diamondbacks drafted Cowgill in the fifth round of the 2008 Major League Baseball draft from Kentucky.

On July 26, 2011, Cowgill was called up from the Triple–A Reno Aces. He hit his first career major league home run as a Diamondback, on August 28, 2011, against the San Diego Padres.

=== Oakland Athletics ===
On December 9, 2011, Cowgill was part of a trade along with Jarrod Parker and Ryan Cook, in which the Diamondbacks acquired Trevor Cahill and Craig Breslow from the Oakland Athletics.

=== New York Mets ===
On December 18, 2012, the Athletics traded Cowgill to the New York Mets for Jefry Marté. Cowgill hit the first grand slam for the Mets on Opening Day in 18 years when he hit one in the 7th inning against the San Diego Padres.

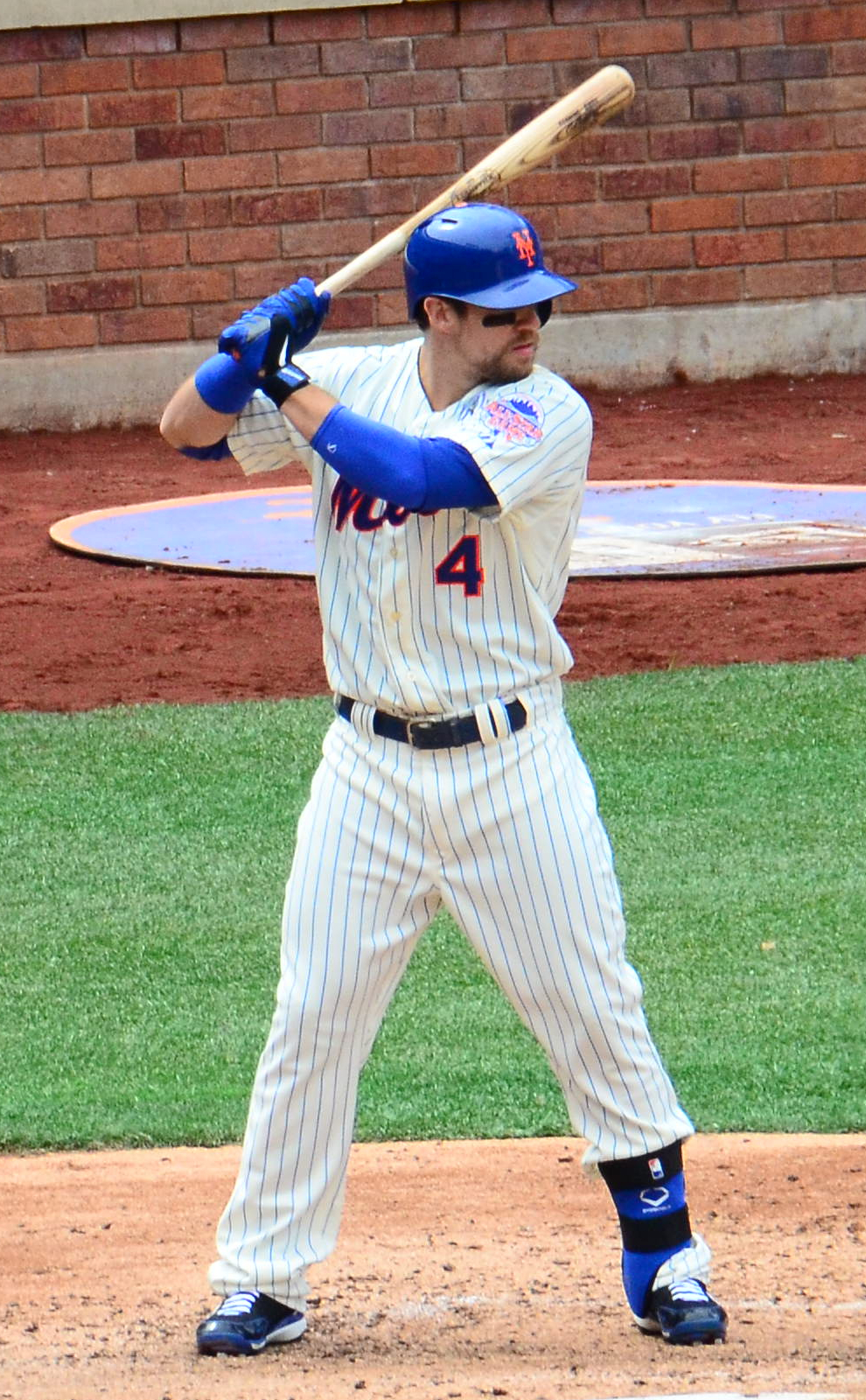
Cowgill with the New York Mets in 2013

Cowgill was named the starting center fielder for the Mets for 2013 after an impressive spring training. After a poor start to the season, Cowgill was set to platoon in center field with Jordany Valdespin. Cowgill was optioned to Triple-A Las Vegas on May 3 when the Mets recalled Andrew Brown. On June 18, 2013, Cowgill was designated for assignment by the Mets.

=== Los Angeles Angels of Anaheim ===
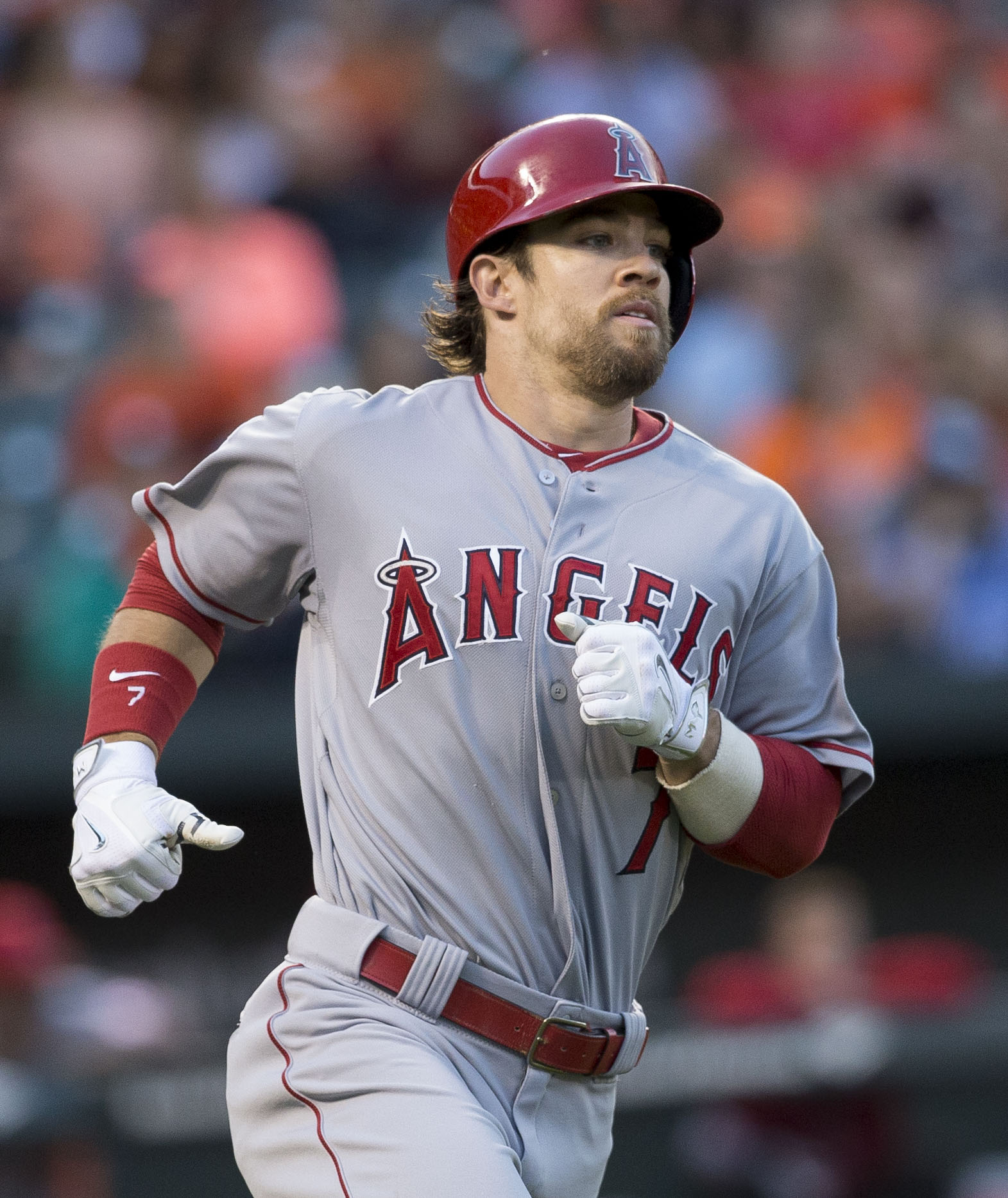
Cowgill in 2015

On June 24, 2013, the Mets traded Cowgill to the Angels in exchange for minor league outfielder Kyle Johnson. On June 10, 2014, Collin Cowgill hit his first walk-off home run in the bottom of the 14th inning to beat the Oakland A's 2–1.

=== Cleveland Indians ===
Cowgill was traded from the Angels to the Cleveland Indians for cash considerations on December 2, 2015. He played in nine games for the Indians, including opening day, before being optioned to the minor league Columbus Clippers. The Indians designated Cowgill for assignment on September 1, 2016, and outrighted him to Columbus on September 2.

Cowgill elected free agency on October 5, 2016.

=== San Diego Padres ===
Cowgill signed a minor league contract with the San Diego Padres in 2017, that included an invitation to spring training. He was released on August 12, 2017.

=== Philadelphia Phillies ===
On February 8, 2018, Cowgill signed a minor league contract with the Philadelphia Phillies organization. In 93 games for the Triple–A Lehigh Valley IronPigs, he batted .230/.309/.408 with 12 home runs and 41 RBI. Cowgill elected free agency following the season on November 2.

=== Washington Nationals ===
On February 21, 2019, Cowgill signed a minor league contract with the Washington Nationals. In 84 games for the Triple–A Fresno Grizzlies, he slashed .228/.330/.440 with 12 home runs, 34 RBI, and eight stolen bases. Cowgill elected free agency following the season on November 4.

On February 17, 2020, Cowgill signed a minor league deal with the Seattle Mariners. Cowgill became a free agent after the season.

== Coaching career ==
=== Seattle Mariners ===
On January 27, 2021, Cowgill was announced as the manager for the Arkansas Travelers, the Double-A affiliate of the Seattle Mariners.

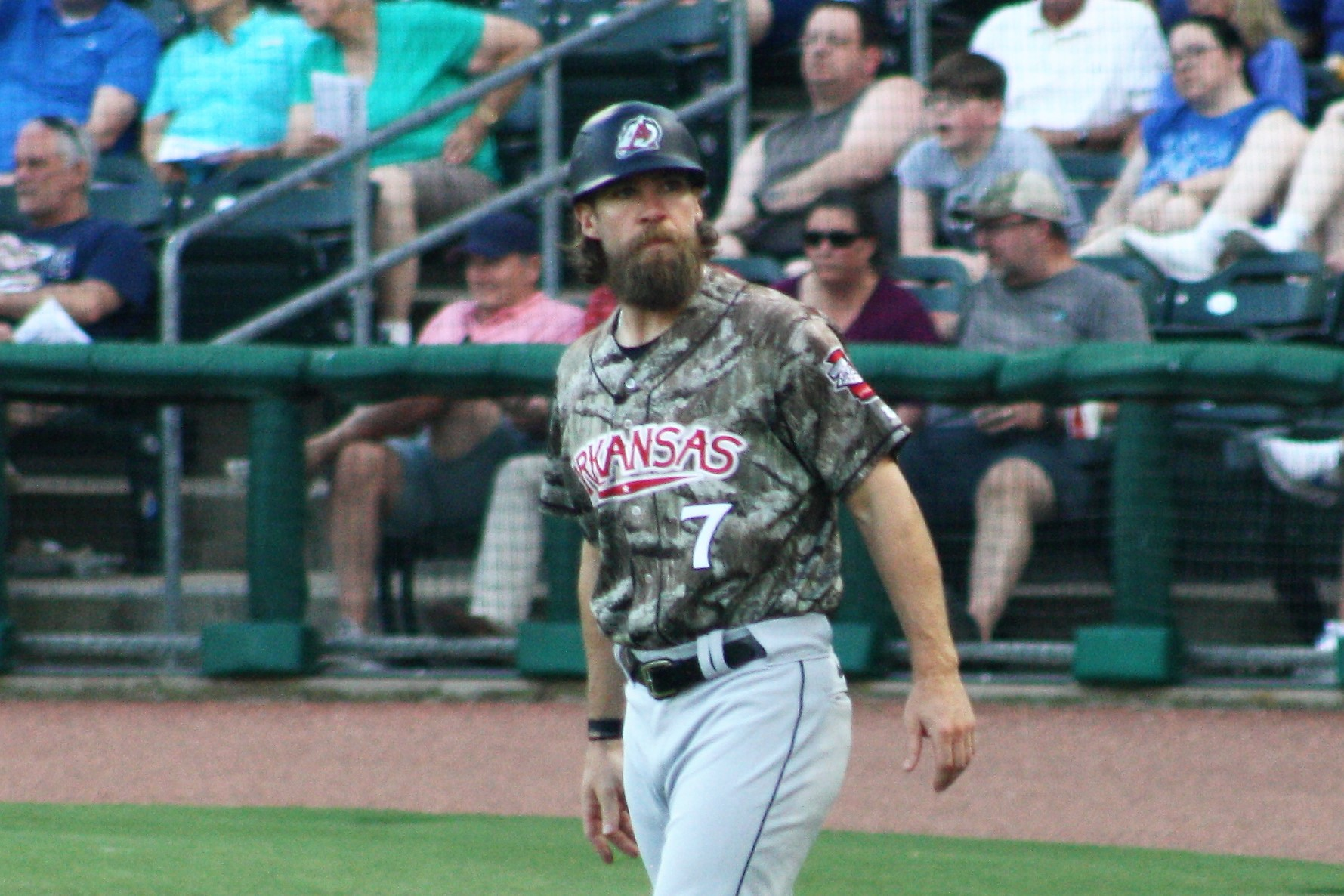
Cowgill as manager of the Travelers

=== Cincinnati Reds ===
The Cincinnati Reds named Cowgill their first base coach before the 2023 season. In February 2026, Cowgill was coaching outfield drills during spring training when he suffered a meniscus tear. He flew back to Cincinnati for surgery but was back with the Reds in Goodyear, Arizona before the month was over. He returned to coaching while still using crutches.

== Personal life ==
Cowgill and his wife, Alyson, have two children.
