= Edgmer Escalona =

Venezuelan baseball pitcher (born 1986)

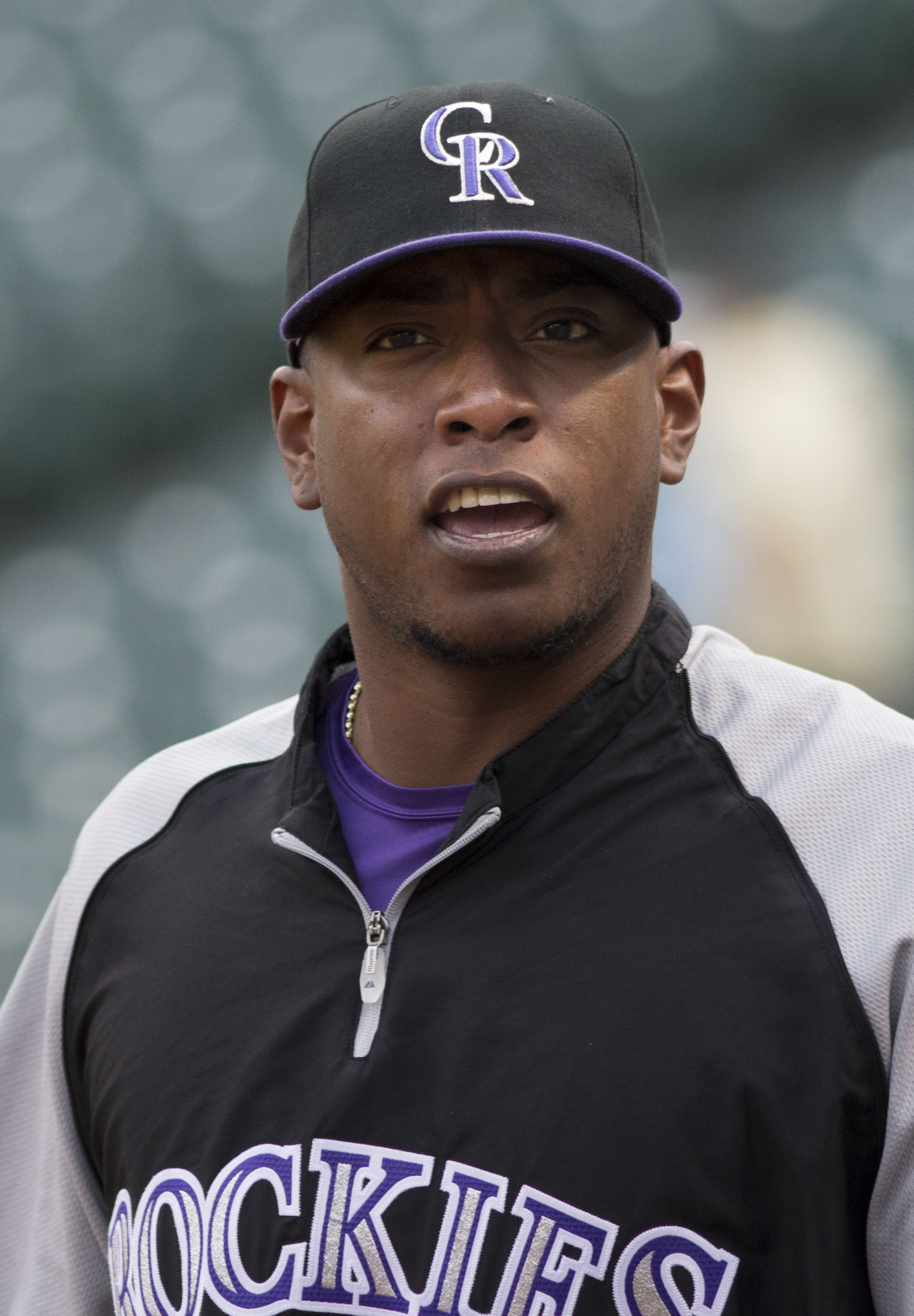
- Escalona with the Colorado Rockies

Free agent
- Relief pitcher
- Born: October 6, 1986 (age 39); La Guaira, Venezuela
- Bats: Right Throws: Right

MLB debut
- September 10, 2010, for the Colorado Rockies

MLB statistics (through 2013 season)
- Win–loss record: 1–5
- Earned run average: 4.50
- Strikeouts: 71
- Stats at Baseball Reference

Teams
- Colorado Rockies (2010–2013)

Edgmer Eduarado Escalona (born October 6, 1986) is a Venezuelan professional baseball pitcher who is a free agent. He has previously played in Major League Baseball (MLB) for the Colorado Rockies.

== Career ==
=== Colorado Rockies ===
Escalona began his professional career in 2006, playing for the DSL Rockies, going 0–2 with a 7.11 ERA in 14 games. In 2007, he went 1–1 with a 4.05 ERA in 18 relief appearances for the Casper Rockies, and in 2008 he went 6–2 with a 3.22 ERA in 44 appearances for the Asheville Tourists. Escalona split the 2009 season between the Modesto Nuts (28 games) and Tulsa Drillers (38 games), going a combined 3–2 with a 2.47 ERA in 59 games.

Escalona began the 2010 season with the Triple-A Colorado Springs Sky Sox. He was called up to the majors in May 2010, but he was sent back to Triple-A the next day without appearing. Escalona was called up to the majors on September 3, 2010. His first appearance came against the Diamondbacks on the 10th, and he pitched a scoreless inning. His first strikeout was of Ryan Ludwick. He pitched 6 innings in 5 appearances for the Rockies in 2010, giving up 1 run and striking out 2.

After spending April in extended spring training, Escalona began 2011 with Colorado Springs, where he pitched May and June before being recalled on July 1 due to a need of pitchers. After pitching a scoreless inning, he was optioned back down. Escalona was recalled after Ubaldo Jiménez was traded, and he spent almost a month before getting placed on the disabled list with a right rotator cuff strain. He returned on September 9, and finished the season with Colorado. In 14 appearances, he had a 1.75 ERA, striking out 14 in 25.2 innings.

Escalona was among the final spring cuts for the Opening Day roster, and he began with Colorado Springs. On April 17, he was recalled by the Rockies. After pitching in 7 games, he was optioned back to Colorado Springs, where he spent the next 3 months until he was recalled on August 4 to replace Christian Friedrich. After going on the disabled list with right elbow inflammation 2 appearances later, Escalona returned on September 2 and finished the year with Colorado. After a very solid September, he lowered his season ERA from 11.88 to 6.04. In 22 appearances with the Rockies, Escalona went 0–1 with 2 holds, striking out 21 in 22.1 innings.

Escalona made his first Opening Day roster in 2013, and got the win in his first appearance of 2013. On June 11, Escalona was placed on the disabled list, and he returned on July 2. On August 23, Escalona was designated for assignment. He was outrighted off the roster on August 29. In 37 games, he went 1–4 with 7 holds and a 5.67 ERA, striking out 34 in 46 innings.

=== Baltimore Orioles ===
Escalona signed a one-year deal with the Baltimore Orioles on November 20, 2013. He was placed on the 60–day disabled list to begin the season after suffering a right shoulder impingement. On June 22, 2014, Escalona was removed from the 40–man roster and sent outright to the Triple–A Norfolk Tides. The next day, he rejected the outright assignment in favor of free agency. He had made six appearances for Norfolk, with a 6.10 ERA and 14 strikeouts in 20 2/3 innings.

=== New York Yankees ===
On July 2, 2014, Escalona signed a minor league contract with the New York Yankees. In 19 games for the Triple–A Scranton/Wilkes-Barre RailRiders, he compiled a 2.08 ERA with 23 strikeouts and 4 saves across 30 1/3 innings pitched. On April 4, 2015, Escalona was released by the Yankees organization.

=== Saraperos de Saltillo ===
On March 13, 2015, Escalona signed a minor league contract with the San Francisco Giants. He was released by the Giants organization prior to the season on April 3.

On April 30, 2015, Escalona signed with the Saraperos de Saltillo of the Mexican League. He made 17 appearances (16 starts) for Saltillo, registering an 11–4 record and 2.54 ERA with 61 strikeouts across 120 2/3 innings pitched.

Escalona pitched in 10 games (9 starts) in 2016, logging a 2–3 record and 4.61 ERA with 35 strikeouts across 54 2/3 innings of work. He was released by the Saraperos on June 6, 2016.

=== Acereros de Monclova ===
On June 13, 2016, Escalona signed with the Acereros de Monclova of the Mexican League. He was released on January 10, 2017.

=== Vaqueros Unión Laguna ===
On June 22, 2017, Escalona signed with the Vaqueros Unión Laguna of the Mexican League. He was released on July 10.

=== Guerreros de Oaxaca ===
On May 22, 2022, after spending multiple years only playing in the Venezuelan Professional Baseball League, Escalona returned to the Mexican League by signing with the Guerreros de Oaxaca. In 3 starts, he posted a 0–1 record with a 9.42 ERA over 14 2/3 innings. Escalona was released on June 5.

== See also ==
- List of Major League Baseball players from Venezuela
