= Andrew Brown (outfielder) =

American baseball player (born 1984)

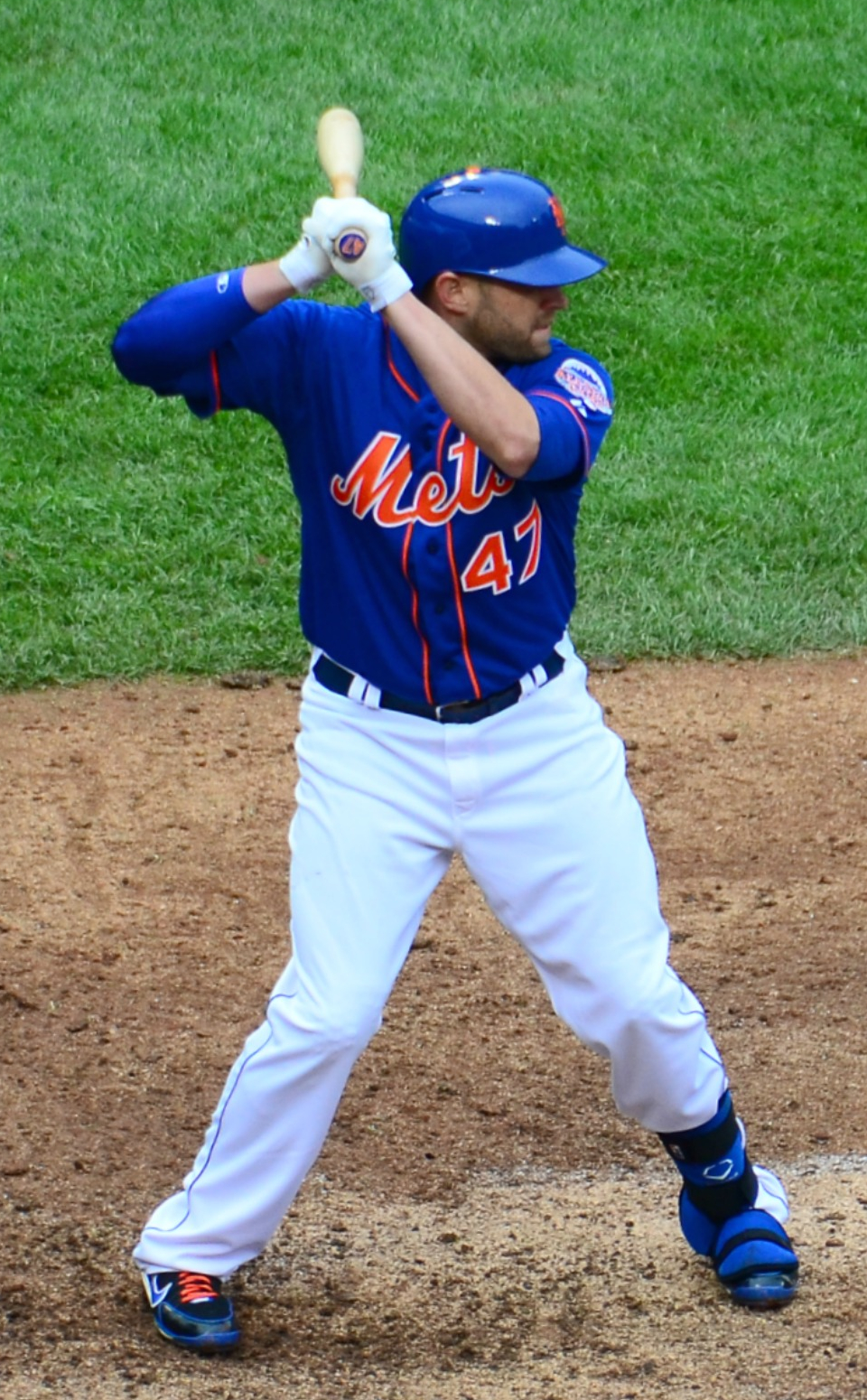
- Brown with the New York Mets
- Outfielder
- Born: September 10, 1984 (age 42); Dallas, Texas, U.S.
- Batted: Right Threw: Right

Professional debut
- MLB: June 12, 2011, for the St. Louis Cardinals
- KBO: March 28, 2015, for the SK Wyverns

Last appearance
- MLB: June 15, 2014, for the New York Mets
- KBO: October 3, 2015, for the SK Wyverns

MLB statistics
- Batting average: .220
- Home runs: 14
- Runs batted in: 45

KBO statistics
- Batting average: .261
- Home runs: 28
- Runs batted in: 76
- Stats at Baseball Reference

Teams
- St. Louis Cardinals (2011); Colorado Rockies (2012); New York Mets (2013–2014); SK Wyverns (2015)

Andrew Marshall Brown (born September 10, 1984) is an American former professional baseball outfielder. He has previously played in Major League Baseball (MLB) for the St. Louis Cardinals, Colorado Rockies and New York Mets, and for the SK Wyverns of the KBO League.

== Major League Baseball ==
=== St. Louis Cardinals ===
Brown was drafted by the St. Louis Cardinals in the 18th round of the 2007 Major League Baseball draft out of the University of Nebraska–Lincoln.

==== 2011 ====
Brown was called up on June 12, 2011. After hitting .182 in 11 games for St. Louis, he was left off the team's postseason roster and designated for assignment on October 9.

=== Colorado Rockies ===
==== 2012 ====
He was claimed off waivers by the Colorado Rockies on October 12.

During the 2012 season, Brown appeared in 46 games for the Rockies, batting .232 with 5 home runs and 11 runs batted in. On the final day of the regular season, he was ejected by umpire Mark Ripperger for arguing that he had been hit by a pitch that was instead ruled a foul ball.

=== New York Mets ===
==== 2013 ====
On January 2, 2013 he signed a minor league contract with the New York Mets that contained an invitation to spring training. He started the season in AAA with the Las Vegas 51s and was called up to the majors on May 3, 2013 when Collin Cowgill was optioned to Las Vegas. During Spring Training 2014 he changed his number from 47 to 30.

==== 2014 ====
On opening day, March 31, 2014, Brown started in place of Chris Young and hit a three-run home run in the first inning off of Stephen Strasburg.

He was claimed off waivers by the Oakland Athletics on October 31, 2014. The Athletics designated him for assignment on November 23, when they acquired Ike Davis. However, the Athletics did not tender him a contract by the December 2 deadline, and he became a free agent.

=== Los Angeles Angels of Anaheim ===
On February 2, 2016, Brown signed a minor league contract with Los Angeles Angels of Anaheim.

On February 29, 2016 he announced his retirement, stating he wished to spend more time with his family.

== KBO League ==
=== SK Wyverns ===
On January 15, 2015, Andrew Brown signed a one-year, $700,000 contract with the SK Wyverns of the KBO League. During his lone season with the SK Wyverns, he hit .261 with 28 HRs and 76 RBIs.
