= Matt Reynolds (pitcher) =

American baseball player (born 1984)

- Pitcher
- Born: October 2, 1984 (age 41); Saint Charles, Illinois, U.S.
- Batted: Left Threw: Left

MLB debut
- August 19, 2010, for the Colorado Rockies

Last MLB appearance
- September 23, 2016, for the San Francisco Giants

MLB statistics
- Win–loss record: 5–6
- Earned run average: 3.80
- Strikeouts: 162
- Stats at Baseball Reference

Teams
- Colorado Rockies (2010–2012); Arizona Diamondbacks (2013, 2015); San Francisco Giants (2016)

Matthew Paul Reynolds (born October 2, 1984) is an American former professional baseball pitcher. He played in Major League Baseball (MLB) for the Colorado Rockies, Arizona Diamondbacks, and San Francisco Giants.

== Professional career ==
=== Colorado Rockies ===
Reynolds was drafted by the Colorado Rockies in the 20th round of the 2007 Major League Baseball draft.

Reynolds was called up to the majors for the first time on August 19, 2010.

=== Arizona Diamondbacks ===
He was traded to the Arizona Diamondbacks on November 20, 2012, in exchange for Ryan Wheeler. On June 10, 2013, Reynolds was placed on the 15-day disabled list with a left elbow strain. On September 24, Reynolds underwent Tommy John surgery, sidelining him for at least most of 2014. In 30 games in 2013, Reynolds went 0–2 with 5 holds, 2 saves and a 1.98 ERA, striking out 23 in 27.1 innings.

On October 15, 2013, Reynolds signed a one-year, $550,000 deal with a $600,000 club option for 2015. On March 29, 2016, Reynolds was released by the Diamondbacks.

=== Lancaster Barnstormers ===
On April 20, 2016, Reynolds signed with the Lancaster Barnstormers of the Atlantic League of Professional Baseball.

=== San Francisco Giants ===
On June 24, 2016, Reynolds contract was purchased by the San Francisco Giants and he was assigned to the Double–A Richmond Flying Squirrels. On July 14, Reynolds was promoted to the Triple–A Sacramento River Cats On July 28, Reynolds was called up from the minors when Josh Osich was placed on the disabled list. He made eight appearances for San Francisco, struggling to a 7.50 ERA with three strikeouts across six innings pitched. Reynolds was designated for assignment by the Giants on September 27. He cleared waivers and was sent outright to Sacramento on October 5. Reynolds elected free agency following the season on November 7.

On December 23, 2016, Reynolds re–signed with the Giants on a minor league contract. He spent the year with Triple–A Sacramento, making 29 appearances and logging a 3.86 ERA with 27 strikeouts in 30 1/3 innings pitched. Reynolds elected free agency following the season on November 6.

=== Return to Lancaster ===
On March 19, 2018, Reynolds signed with the Lancaster Barnstormers of the Atlantic League of Professional Baseball. He announced his retirement on August 26, 2018.
