= Drew Pomeranz =

American baseball player (born 1988)

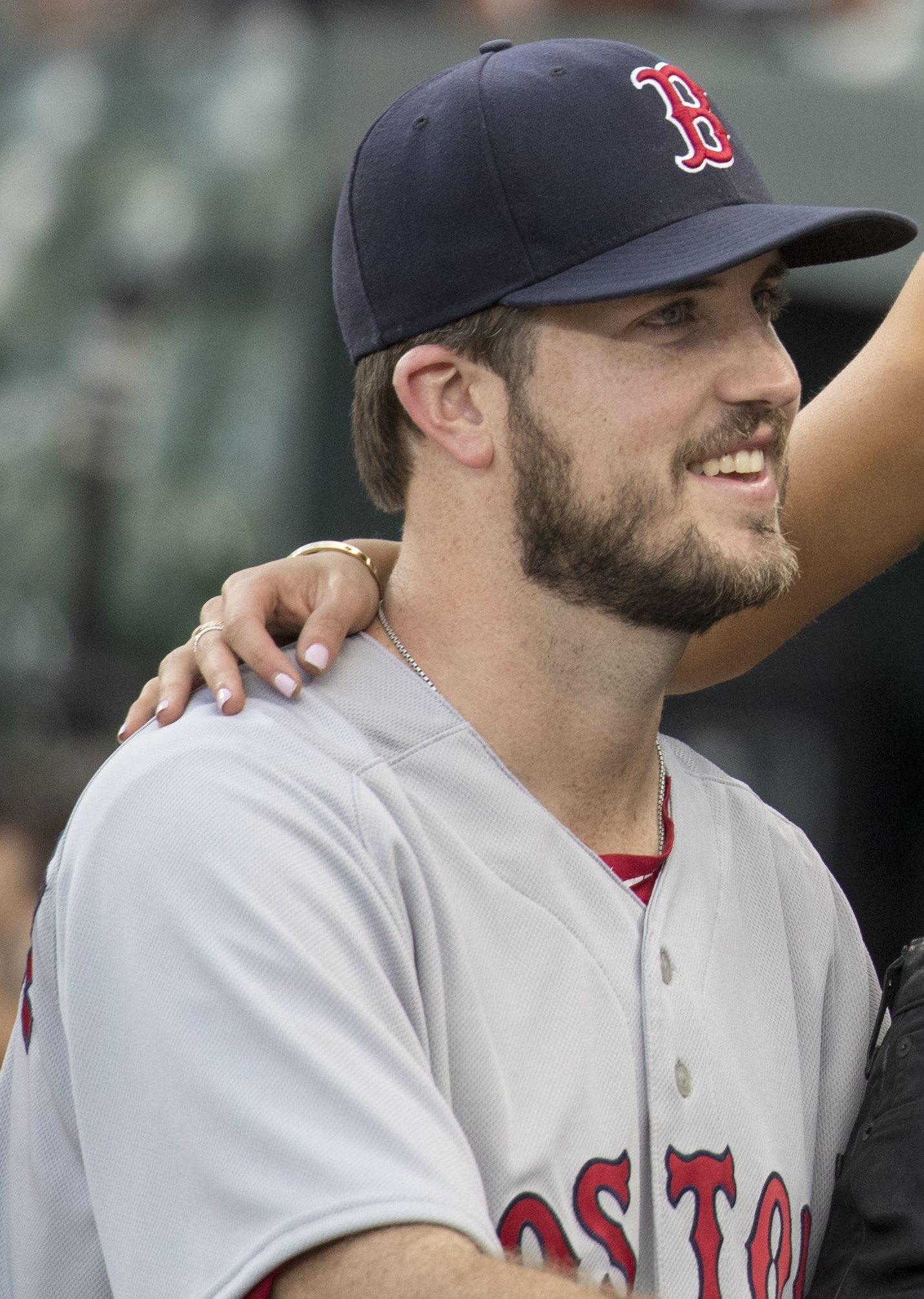
- Pomeranz with the Boston Red Sox in 2017

Free agent
- Pitcher
- Born: November 22, 1988 (age 37); Memphis, Tennessee, U.S.
- Bats: Right Throws: Left

MLB debut
- September 11, 2011, for the Colorado Rockies

MLB statistics (through 2026 season)
- Win–loss record: 52–63
- Earned run average: 3.87
- Strikeouts: 957
- Stats at Baseball Reference

Teams
- Colorado Rockies (2011–2013); Oakland Athletics (2014–2015); San Diego Padres (2016); Boston Red Sox (2016–2018); San Francisco Giants (2019); Milwaukee Brewers (2019); San Diego Padres (2020–2021); Chicago Cubs (2025); Los Angeles Angels (2026); Chicago Cubs (2026)

Career highlights and awards
- All-Star (2016); World Series champion (2018)

Thomas Andrew Pomeranz (born November 22, 1988), nicknamed "Big Smooth", is an American professional baseball pitcher who is a free agent. He has previously played in Major League Baseball (MLB) for the Colorado Rockies, Oakland Athletics, Boston Red Sox, San Francisco Giants, Milwaukee Brewers, San Diego Padres, Los Angeles Angels, and Chicago Cubs. Pomeranz was an MLB All-Star with the Padres in 2016, and a World Series champion with the Red Sox in 2018.

== Early life ==
Thomas Andrew Pomeranz was born on November 22, 1988, in Memphis, Tennessee. Pomeranz is from Collierville, Tennessee. He was selected in the 12th round of the 2007 Major League Baseball draft by the Texas Rangers, but did not sign and opted to play college baseball for the University of Mississippi. He also received scholarship offers from Tennessee, Memphis, and Mississippi State and was recruited heavily by LSU and Alabama.

== College career ==
Pomeranz pitched the United States Collegiate National Team to a victory in the 2009 World Baseball Challenge, throwing a one-hitter in the championship game against the German national baseball team. He finished the tournament with a 4–1 record and a 1.75 earned run average (ERA), while also leading the team with 48 strikeouts. Pomeranz was the 2010 recipient of the Cellular South Ferriss Trophy (now the C Spire Ferriss Trophy), awarded annually to Mississippi's top collegiate baseball player.

== Professional career ==
=== Draft and minor leagues ===
Pomeranz was initially drafted by the Texas Rangers in 2007 but decided to go to college instead. He was then drafted by the Cleveland Indians in the first round of the 2010 Major League Baseball draft. He signed with the Indians on August 16, 2010, right before the deadline; his contract, which included a $2.65 million signing bonus, was the largest bonus given to a college pitcher in the draft that year.

He was considered one of the top 50 prospects in baseball in 2011. On July 31, 2011, Pomeranz, Alex White, Joe Gardner, and Matt McBride were traded to the Colorado Rockies for Ubaldo Jiménez.

=== Colorado Rockies (2011–2013) ===
Pomeranz made his Major League debut when he started and pitched five scoreless innings to pick up the win against the Cincinnati Reds on September 11. He made 4 starts in September 2011, finishing 1–2 with a 5.40 ERA.

After employing a 75-pitch limit after the first month of the season, Pomeranz averaged less than 5 innings per start. On May 7, 2012, Pomeranz hit his first career home run. Pomeranz spent the 2012 season between Triple–A and the Rockies rotation, making 22 starts for them despite recording a 2–9 record. For the 2013 season, Pomeranz began the season in Triple–A and would only appear in 8 games, 4 starts for the Rockies.

=== Oakland Athletics (2014–2015) ===
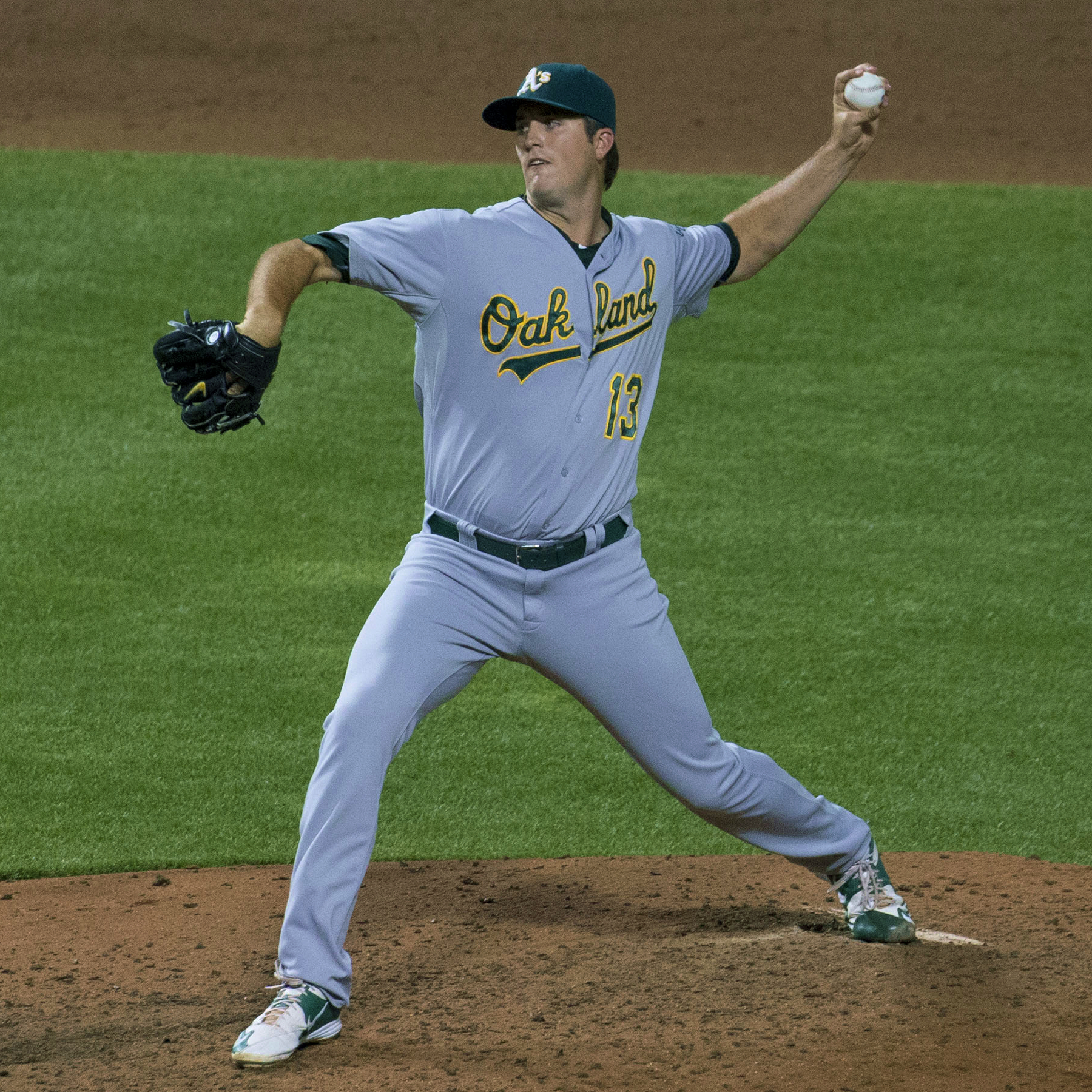
Drew Pomeranz with the Oakland Athletics in 2015

On December 10, 2013, Pomeranz, along with minor league pitcher Chris Jensen, was traded to the Oakland Athletics for pitcher Brett Anderson. Pomeranz began 2014 as a member of the A's bullpen, where he made 9 appearances, going 1–1 with a 1.98 ERA in 13.2 innings, before being moved to the rotation on May 9 to replace the struggling Dan Straily. Pomeranz did not give up a run in the rotation until his fourth start, on May 25, giving Oakland three 5-inning starts of shutout ball before. He made 8 starts, going 4–3 with a 3.21 ERA, striking out 37 in 42 innings, before fracturing his non-throwing hand by punching a wooden chair after giving up 8 runs in 3.2 innings against the Rangers on June 16. Brad Mills took his spot in the rotation as Pomeranz went on the disabled list. He was recalled from the Sacramento River Cats on August 27 for a start against the Houston Astros. He was optioned to the Beloit Snappers the next day. In his first season as an Oakland Athletic, Pomeranz posted a career low 2.35 ERA in 20 games, 10 starts for the A's.

For the 2015 season, Pomeranz was shifted to the bullpen while also starting 9 games for the A's. Despite raising his ERA a full run higher from the previous season, Pomeranz finished appearing in a career-high 53 games, recording 3 saves and logging in 86 innings.

=== San Diego Padres (2016) ===
On December 2, 2015, the Athletics traded Pomeranz, José Torres, and a player to be named later or cash considerations to the San Diego Padres for Marc Rzepczynski and Yonder Alonso. Pomeranz approached Padres' manager Andy Green about giving him an opportunity to start. Pomeranz made the Padres' starting rotation, and was named to appear in the 2016 MLB All-Star Game after posting a 2.47 ERA and leading the NL with a .184 batting average against in the first half.

=== Boston Red Sox (2016–2018) ===
During the 2016 MLB All-Star break, the Padres traded Pomeranz to the Boston Red Sox for Anderson Espinoza, a highly regarded minor league pitching prospect. On September 16, 2016, Padres general manager A. J. Preller was suspended for 30 days for keeping two sets of medical records for players—one internal and one for league use. There had been several instances of duplicate records, but the suspension was handed out specifically with respect to the Pomeranz trade.

With the 2016 Red Sox, Pomeranz pitched to a 4.59 ERA and a record of 3–5, recording 71 strikeouts and 24 walks in 68 2/3 innings of work in 14 regular season appearances (13 starts). That season he led all major league pitchers in curveball percentage (39.2%). He also tied for the major league lead in bunt hits allowed, with eight. In the ALDS against the Cleveland Indians, he made two relief appearances, allowing two runs in 3 2/3 innings (4.91 ERA).

For the 2017 Red Sox, Pomeranz had a record of 17–6 with a 3.32 ERA in 32 appearances (all starts), registering 174 strikeouts and 69 walks in 173 2/3 regular season innings. For the second consecutive season he led all major league pitchers in curveball percentage (37.0%). In the postseason, he started Game 2 of the ALDS against the Houston Astros; he only pitched into the third inning while allowing four runs (18.00 ERA) and took the loss.

During the 2018 Red Sox season, Pomeranz made his first start on April 20, after beginning the season on the disabled list due to a flexor strain. Through the end of May, his record was 1–3 with a 6.81 ERA. On June 5, he was placed on the disabled list due to left biceps tendinitis; he was activated on July 24 as a relief pitcher. He remained in the bullpen for the remainder of the season, finishing at 2–6 with a 6.08 ERA in 26 games (11 starts) for Boston. Pomeranz was initially not included on Boston's postseason roster, but was added for the World Series in place of Brandon Workman. Although Pomeranz did not pitch in the World Series, the Red Sox beat the Los Angeles Dodgers in five games, making Pomeranz a World Series champion for the first time in his career.

=== San Francisco Giants (2019) ===
On January 23, 2019, Pomeranz signed with the San Francisco Giants on a one-year contract worth $1.5 million and including an additional $3.5 million attainable through incentives. He was moved to the bullpen on July 20 after he struggled with a 6.10 ERA in 17 starts and a 2–9 record.

=== Milwaukee Brewers (2019) ===
On July 31, 2019, the Giants traded Pomeranz and Ray Black to the Milwaukee Brewers for Mauricio Dubon. Pomeranz made 25 relief appearances for the Brewers, logging an 0–1 record and 2.39 ERA with 45 strikeouts and two saves across 26 1/3 inning pitched.

=== Second stint with Padres (2020–2021) ===
On November 27, 2019, Pomeranz signed a four-year contract with the San Diego Padres. Pomeranz began the shortened 2020 season with 18 2/3 consecutive scoreless innings before giving up a three-run home run to Wilmer Flores of the San Francisco Giants on September 25, in the final series of the season.

In 2021 for the Padres, Pomeranz pitched to a 1.75 ERA with 30 strikeouts in 27 appearances. On August 14, 2021, it was announced that Pomeranz would undergo season-ending surgery to repair a torn flexor tendon.

Pomeranz began the 2022 season in recovery as he was placed on the 60-day injured list on March 28, 2022. He did not appear in a game for San Diego in 2022, and began the 2023 season on the injured list as he recovered from left elbow flexor tendon surgery. On May 23, 2023, Pomeranz underwent an additional surgery, described by manager Bob Melvin as a 'cleanup' procedure. On September 19, it was announced that Pomeranz would not appear for San Diego in 2023 after he experienced a setback in his rehabilitation with the Triple–A El Paso Chihuahuas. He became a free agent following the season.

On February 14, 2024, Pomeranz signed a minor league contract with the Los Angeles Angels. He was released by the Angels organization prior to the start of the regular season on March 24.

=== Los Angeles Dodgers ===
Pomeranz signed a minor league contract with the Los Angeles Dodgers on March 29. On April 19, Pomeranz opted out of his contract and became a free agent only to re-sign with them on a new minor league deal the following day. In eight games for the Triple–A Oklahoma City Baseball Club, he posted a 6.00 ERA with 14 strikeouts across nine innings of work before he was released by the organization on May 23.

=== San Francisco Giants (second stint) ===
On May 24, 2024, Pomeranz signed a one–year, major league contract with the San Francisco Giants. He did not make an appearance for the Giants before he was designated for assignment on May 28. Pomeranz cleared waivers and was sent outright to the Triple–A Sacramento River Cats on May 31. However, he rejected the assignment and subsequently elected free agency.

=== Seattle Mariners ===
On November 26, 2024, Pomeranz signed a minor league contract with the Seattle Mariners. Pomeranz was released by the Mariners on March 23, 2025, but re-signed with the organization on a new minor league contract on March 27. He made nine appearances for the Triple-A Tacoma Rainiers, recording a 4.66 ERA with 14 strikeouts and two saves across 9 2/3 innings pitched.

=== Chicago Cubs (2025) ===
On April 21, 2025, Pomeranz was traded to the Chicago Cubs after exercising the upward mobility clause in his contract. Pomeranz made 57 appearances for the Cubs, accumulating a 2-2 record and 2.17 ERA with 57 strikeouts and one save across 49 2/3 innings pitched.

=== Los Angeles Angels (2026) ===
On December 16, 2025, Pomeranz signed a one-year, $4 million contract with the Los Angeles Angels. He made 25 relief appearances for Los Angeles, compiling an 0-3 record and 5.01 ERA with 16 strikeouts across 23 1/3 innings pitched. Pomeranz was designated for assignment by the Angels on June 16, 2026. He was released by the team two days later.

=== Chicago Cubs (2026) ===
On June 26, 2026, Pomeranz signed a minor league contract with the Chicago Cubs. He made two scoreless appearances for the Triple-A Iowa Cubs prior to being added to Chicago's active roster on July 3. Pomeranz made six appearances for the Cubs, logging a 2–0 record and 7.94 ERA with one strikeout across 5 2/3 innings pitched. He was designated for assignment by the team on July 20. Pomeranz cleared waivers and elected free agency on July 24.

== Personal life ==
Pomeranz married his longtime girlfriend, Carolyn Esserman, on November 19, 2016. His older brother Stu also played in MLB. Drew and Stu are great-grandsons of former professional football and baseball player Garland Buckeye, making them the second and third players in history to be great-grandsons of a former Major League player. Pomeranz and his wife have one son and a daughter.
