= Edwar Cabrera =

Dominican baseball player (born 1987)

- Pitcher
- Born: October 20, 1987 (age 38); Baní, Dominican Republic
- Batted: Left Threw: Left

MLB debut
- June 27, 2012, for the Colorado Rockies

Last appearance
- July 24, 2012, for the Colorado Rockies

MLB statistics
- Win–loss record: 0–2
- Earned run average: 11.12
- Strikeouts: 5
- Stats at Baseball Reference

Teams
- Colorado Rockies (2012)

Edwar Alfonso Cabrera (born October 20, 1987) is a Dominican former professional baseball pitcher. He played in Major League Baseball (MLB) for the Colorado Rockies.

== Professional career ==
=== Colorado Rockies ===
Cabrera was added to the Rockies' 40-man roster on November 18, 2011, in order to be protected from the Rule 5 draft. He was named to participate in the 2012 All-Star Futures Game. Cabrera was invited to spring training in 2012, and sent to minors on March 15. Called up on June 26, to start against the Washington Nationals the next day, Cabrera pitched 2 1/3 innings, yielding five hits, three walks, and seven runs, while recording one strikeout in his major league debut. On June 29, he was optioned to the Triple-A Colorado Springs Sky Sox. Cabrera was recalled on July 24 to start against the Arizona Diamondbacks that night, and optioned to the minors three days later. On February 14, 2013, the Rockies diagnosed Cabrera with shoulder impingement and placed him on the 60-day disabled list. He had gotten sick over the offseason, which caused him to postpone the start of his throwing program.

=== Texas Rangers ===
Cabrera was claimed off waivers by the Texas Rangers on October 16, 2013. He was removed from the 40-man roster and sent outright to the Triple-A Round Rock Express on November 20. Cabrera made 30 appearances (24 starts) for Round Rock and the Double-A Frisco RoughRiders in 2014, registering a cumulative 6–9 record and 3.38 ERA with 115 strikeouts across 146 1/3 innings pitched.

Cabrera spent the 2015 season back with Frisco and Round Rock, making 33 appearances (seven starts) and compiling a 5–2 record with a 3.91 ERA and 61 strikeouts over 78 1/3 innings of work.

=== Houston Astros ===
On January 26, 2016, Cabrera signed a minor league contract with the Houston Astros. In 11 appearances for the Triple-A Fresno Grizzlies, he struggled to an 0–1 record and 7.94 ERA with 13 strikeouts across 11 1/3 innings pitched. Cabrera was released by the Astros organization on May 16.
