= Rafael Ortega (baseball) =

Venezuelan baseball player (born 1991)

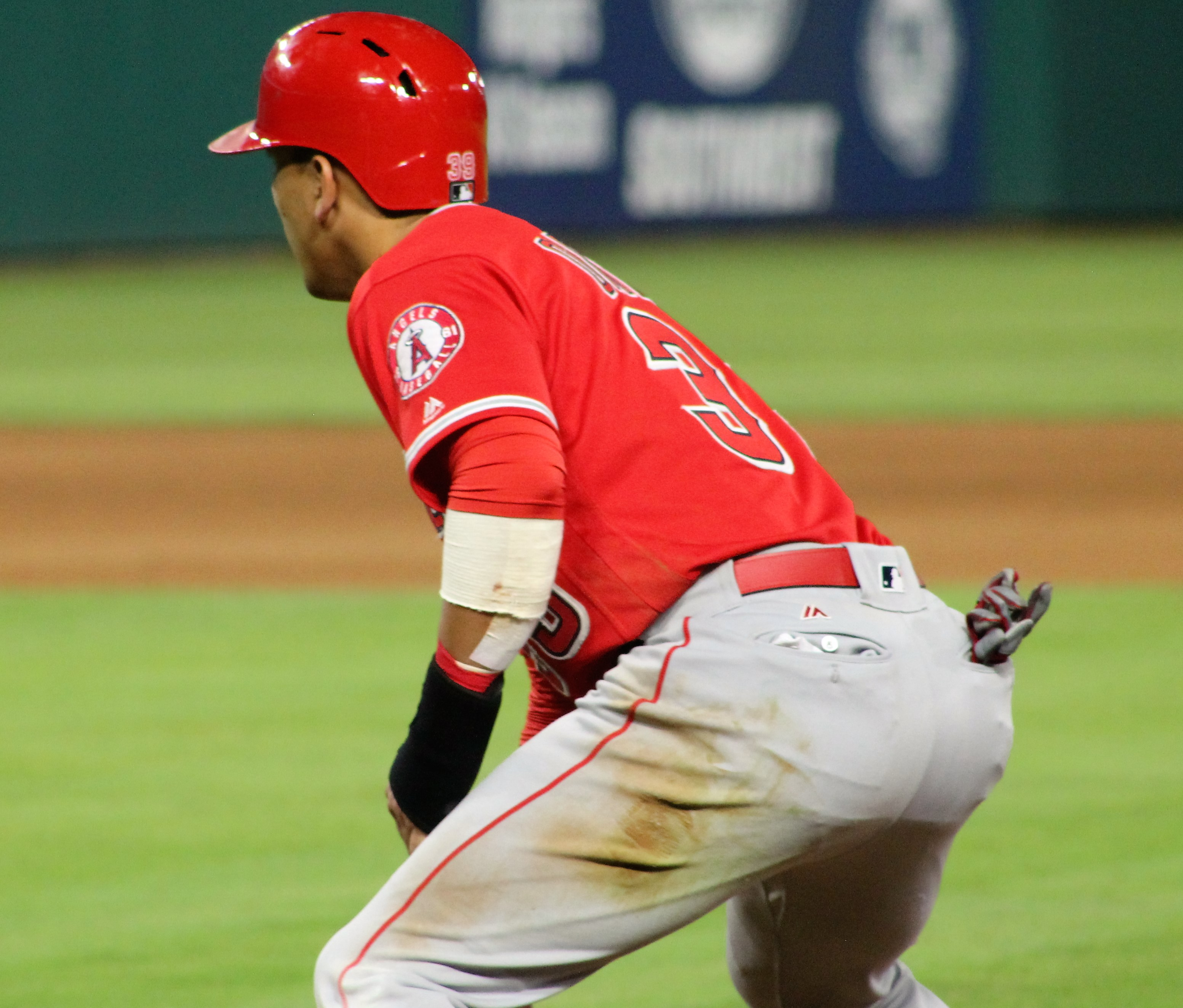
- Ortega with the Los Angeles Angels in 2016

Toros de Tijuana – No. 5
- Outfielder
- Born: May 15, 1991 (age 35); El Tigre, Venezuela
- Bats: Left Throws: Right

MLB debut
- September 30, 2012, for the Colorado Rockies

MLB statistics (through 2024 season)
- Batting average: .245
- Home runs: 22
- Runs batted in: 110
- Stats at Baseball Reference

Teams
- Colorado Rockies (2012); Los Angeles Angels (2016); Miami Marlins (2018); Atlanta Braves (2019); Chicago Cubs (2021–2022); New York Mets (2023); Chicago White Sox (2024)

Rafael Ángel Ortega García (born May 15, 1991) is a Venezuelan professional baseball outfielder for the Toros de Tijuana of the Mexican League. He has previously played in Major League Baseball (MLB) for the Colorado Rockies, Los Angeles Angels, Miami Marlins, Atlanta Braves, Chicago Cubs, New York Mets, and Chicago White Sox.

== Career ==
=== Colorado Rockies ===
On January 30, 2008, Ortega was signed as an amateur free agent by the Colorado Rockies. He made his professional debut with the Dominican Summer League Rockies. In 2009, Ortega remained with the DSL Rockies, slashing .324/.395/.414 in 70 games. In 2010, he played with the rookie ball Casper Ghosts, batting .358/.426/.510 with 7 home runs and 45 RBI. The next year, Ortega played for the Single–A Asheville Tourists, hitting .294/.335/.438 with 9 home runs and 66 RBI. He began the 2012 season with the High–A Modesto Nuts, and hit .283 in 114 games for the team. Ortega made his major league debut with the Rockies on September 30, 2012. He spent the 2013 season with the Double-A Tulsa Drillers, slashing .228/.315/.297 in 42 games.

=== St. Louis Cardinals ===
Ortega was claimed off waivers by the Texas Rangers on November 27, 2013. The Rangers designated Ortega for assignment on December 30.

The St. Louis Cardinals claimed Ortega off waivers on January 6, 2014. He was assigned to the Double-A Springfield Cardinals to begin the year. On September 8, Ortega was designated for assignment by St. Louis. He cleared waivers and was sent outright to the Triple-A Memphis Redbirds on September 10.

Ortega spent the 2015 season in Memphis, batting .286/.367/.378 with 2 home runs and 42 RBI. On November 6, 2015, he elected free agency.

=== Los Angeles Angels ===
The Los Angeles Angels of Anaheim signed Ortega to a one-year, major league contract on December 1, 2015. Ortega made the team out of spring training as a fourth outfielder. After injuries to their starting left fielders, Ortega was entrenched as the Angels left fielder. In 36 games, he hit .236 and only struck out 16 times in 122 at bats. On June 11, Ortega was sent down to Triple-A. On November 11, 2016, Ortega was designated for assignment by the Angels. He elected free agency on November 18.

=== San Diego Padres ===
On December 13, 2016, Ortega signed a minor league contract with the San Diego Padres organization. He spent the 2017 season with the Triple-A El Paso Chihuahuas, posting a .317/.383/.468 batting line with 4 home runs and 31 RBI. He elected free agency following the season on November 6, 2017.

=== Miami Marlins ===
Ortega signed a minor league contract with the Miami Marlins on December 15, 2017. He was assigned to the Triple-A New Orleans Baby Cakes to begin the year. On August 10, 2018, Ortega was selected to the active roster. He hit .233/.287/.271 with 7 RBI in 41 games for Miami. On October 12, Ortega was outrighted off of the 40-man roster. He elected free agency on October 17.

=== Atlanta Braves ===
On November 19, 2018, Ortega signed a minor league contract with the Atlanta Braves that included an invitation to spring training. He was assigned to the Triple-A Gwinnett Stripers to begin the season. On August 13, 2019, the Braves selected his contract. Ortega hit his second career home run, a grand slam against Los Angeles Dodgers pitcher Dustin May, on August 18. He hit .205/.271/.307 with 2 home runs and 10 RBI in 34 games for Atlanta. He was included in the Braves' NLDS roster as the Braves fell to the St. Louis Cardinals in 5 games. Ortega was non-tendered on December 2, and became a free agent.

On December 10, 2019, Ortega re-signed with Atlanta on a minor league contract. Ortega did not play in a game in 2020 due to the cancellation of the minor league season because of the COVID-19 pandemic. He became a free agent on November 2, 2020.

=== Chicago Cubs ===
On February 12, 2021, Ortega signed a minor league deal with the Cubs which included an invitation to major-league spring training. Ortega did not make the Cubs opening day roster. He was however selected to the alternate site roster in South Bend, preceding the start of the delayed Minor League Baseball season.

On May 26, Ortega was selected to the active roster. In his regular-season Cubs debut against the Pittsburgh Pirates, Ortega went 1 for 3 with a walk and a run scored. On May 29, Ortega hit both his first home run of the 2021 season and as a Cub against Ryan Hendrix of the Cincinnati Reds. In the month of July, Ortega hit .368/.419/.500 including a .378/.429/.578 slash-line following the All-Star break. On July 31, Ortega hit his third home run of the year against Joe Ross of the Washington Nationals, the most home runs he's ever hit in one season.

On August 1, Ortega continued his hot streak hitting three home runs in one game, tying the club record and becoming just the 43rd Cub to do so. On August 23, Ortega ended the Cubs franchise record 13-game home losing streak at Wrigley Field with a walk-off 2-run home run against Daniel Bard of the Colorado Rockies. On August 25, Ortega stole home as a part of a double steal with Ian Happ. He became the first Cubs player to steal home since Billy Hamilton did so on September 27, 2020, also part of a double steal. On August 28, during the Crosstown Classic, Ortega hit a grand slam against Lance Lynn of the Chicago White Sox as a part of the Cubs' 7–0 victory. Ortega finished the 2021 season batting .291/.360/.463 with 11 home runs, 33 RBIs and 12 stolen bases in a career-high 103 games.

Ortega played in 118 games for the Cubs in 2022, a new career–high. In 316 at-bats, he hit .241/.331/.358 with 7 home runs, 35 RBI, and 12 stolen bases. His season ended prematurely on September 13, after he suffered a broken finger after attempting a sacrifice bunt against New York Mets starter Jacob deGrom. On November 18, 2022, Ortega was non–tendered and became a free agent.

=== Texas Rangers (second stint) ===
On January 3, 2023, Ortega signed a minor league contract with the New York Yankees. After being informed that he did not make the Opening Day roster, Ortega requested and was granted his release on March 28.

On March 30, 2023, Ortega signed a minor league contract with the Texas Rangers. He played in 44 games for the Triple–A Round Rock Express, hitting .226/.333/.381 with 5 home runs, 26 RBI, and 8 stolen bases. Ortega was released by the Rangers organization on June 4.

=== New York Mets ===
On June 16, 2023, Ortega signed a minor league contract with the New York Mets organization. In 30 games for the Triple–A Syracuse Mets, he hit .230/.379/.398 with 4 home runs, 15 RBI, and 6 stolen bases. On August 1, Ortega was selected to the major league roster after the Mets traded away outfielders Mark Canha and Tommy Pham at the trade deadline. In 47 games for the Mets, he batted .219/.341/.272 with one home run, 8 RBI, and 6 stolen bases. Following the season on October 20, Ortega was removed from the 40–man roster and sent outright to Triple–A, but refused the assignment and elected free agency on October 24.

=== Chicago White Sox ===
On January 12, 2024, Ortega signed a minor league contract with the Chicago White Sox organization. In 18 games for the Triple–A Charlotte Knights, he batted .241/.378/.431 with three home runs, 14 RBI, and six stolen bases. On April 26, Ortega was selected to the major league roster. He played in 14 games for Chicago, going 1–for–14 (.071) with one RBI and two walks. On May 15, Ortega was designated for assignment following the acquisition of Corey Julks. He cleared waivers and was sent outright to Triple–A Charlotte on May 17. Ortega elected free agency on October 10.

=== New York Mets (second stint) ===
On November 18, 2024, Ortega signed a minor league contract with the New York Mets. He made 27 appearances split between the rookie-level Florida Complex League Mets, Single-A St. Lucie Mets, High-A Brooklyn Cyclones, and Triple-A Syracuse Mets, hitting a combined .231/.301/.418 with three home runs, 18 RBI, and four stolen bases. On August 14, 2025, Ortega triggered an opt-out clause in his contract and was released by the Mets organization.

=== Toros de Tijuana ===
On February 12, 2026, Ortega signed with the Toros de Tijuana of the Mexican League.

== See also ==
- List of Major League Baseball players from Venezuela
