= Matt McBride =

American baseball player (born 1985)

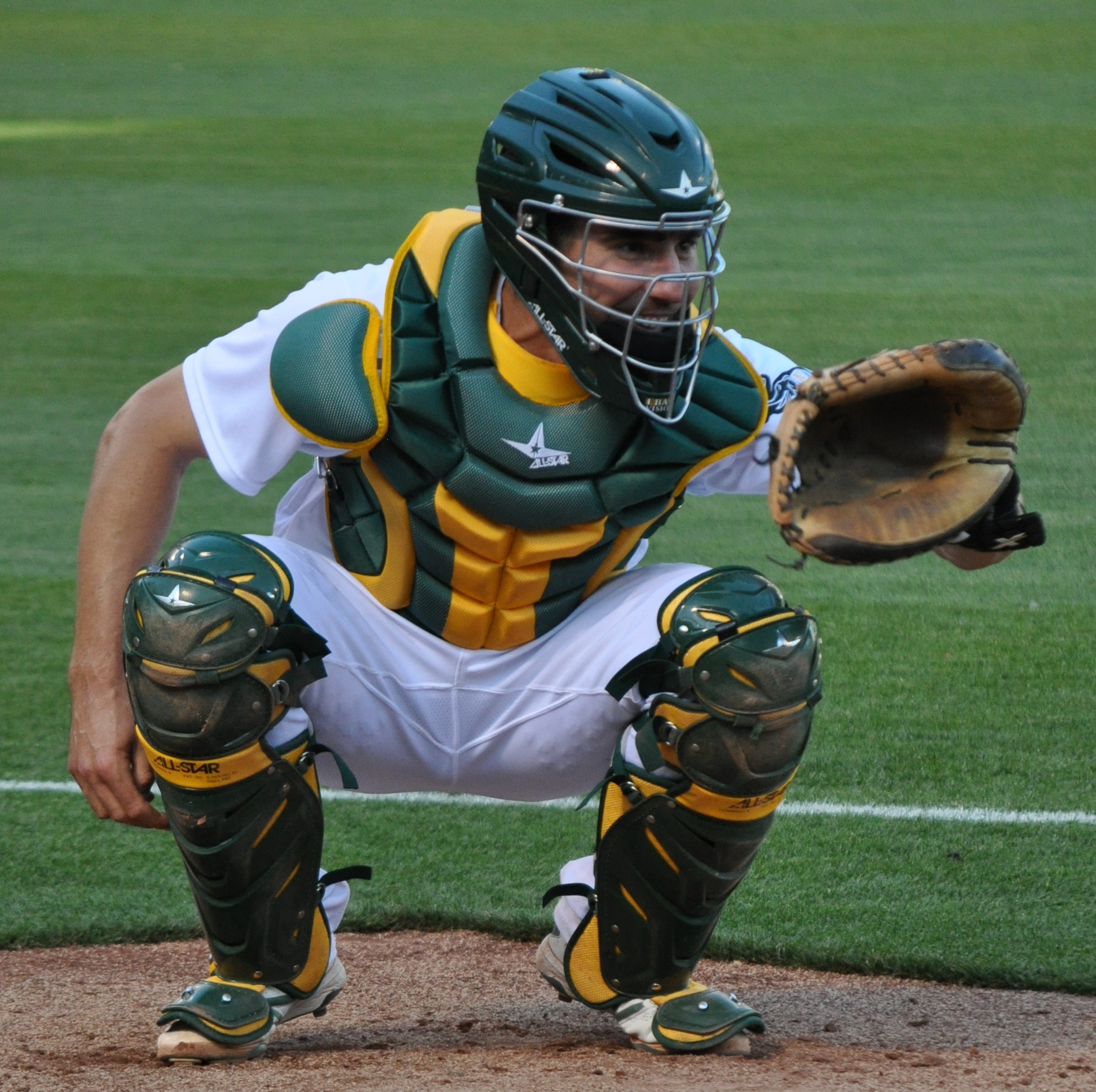
- McBride with the Oakland Athletics
- Catcher / Right fielder / First baseman
- Born: May 23, 1985 (age 41); Bethlehem, Pennsylvania, U.S.
- Batted: Right Threw: Right

MLB debut
- August 4, 2012, for the Colorado Rockies

Last MLB appearance
- September 28, 2016, for the Oakland Athletics

MLB statistics
- Batting average: .201
- Home runs: 4
- Runs batted in: 19
- Stats at Baseball Reference

Teams
- Colorado Rockies (2012, 2014–2015); Oakland Athletics (2016)

Career highlights and awards
- WBSC Premier12 All-World Team (2015)
Medals
Men's baseball
Representing United States
WBSC Premier12
Silver medal – second place	2015 Tokyo	Team

Matthew Hagerty McBride (born May 23, 1985) is an American former professional baseball first baseman and catcher. He played in Major League Baseball (MLB) for the Colorado Rockies and Oakland Athletics.

McBride was drafted by the Cleveland Indians in the second round of the 2006 MLB draft. He made his MLB debut with the Colorado Rockies in 2012, with whom he played right field and first base. McBride's MLB career statistics included outfield games played, 22; first base games, 18; and games caught, 16. His MLB batting line was at .201/.228/.299, with 4 home runs (HR), and 19 runs batted in (RBI).

== Career ==
=== Cleveland Indians ===
McBride attended Liberty High School in Bethlehem, Pennsylvania, and was drafted by the Cleveland Indians in the second round (75th overall) of the 2006 MLB draft out of Lehigh University. Although he was drafted as a catcher, he has also spent considerable time at first base and in the outfield.

He made his professional debut playing for the Class A-Short Season Mahoning Valley Scrappers of the New York–Penn League in 2006. By 2011, he had made his way to Triple-A with the International League's Columbus Clippers.

=== Colorado Rockies ===
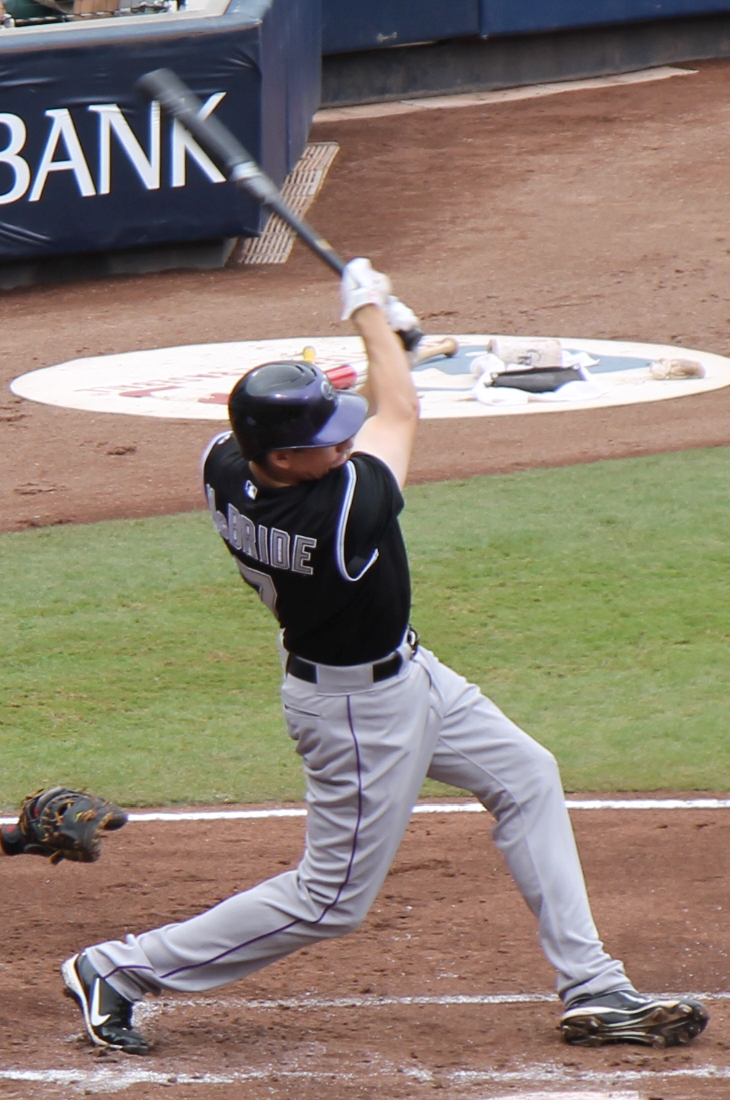
McBride with the Rockies in 2012.

In July 2011, he was traded from Cleveland to the Colorado Rockies with Drew Pomeranz, Alex White, and Joe Gardner for Ubaldo Jiménez. With the Rockies, he was assigned to the Triple-A Colorado Springs Sky Sox.

On August 4, 2012, he made his MLB debut with the Rockies. In four at bats, he recorded two hits (including a double), one RBI, and a run scored. He mostly split the 2013 to 2015 seasons between Triple-A and the Rockies. In 2015 with the Rockies, in 42 at bats he hit .167/.186/.167.

=== Oakland Athletics ===
He was granted free agency in October 2015, and signed a minor league contract with the Oakland Athletics in December 2015. He was assigned to the Nashville Sounds (Triple-A), where he began the 2016 season. The Athletics called him up to the MLB on April 27, and for the season he batted .209/.227/.279 as he caught 11% (1 of 9) of attempted base-stealers. He was sent outright to Triple-A after the 2016 season, and elected to become a free agent.

He re-signed a minor league contract with the A's on November 16, 2016. On June 7, 2017, McBride caught a combined no-hitter with Sounds batterymates Chris Smith, Sean Doolittle, Tucker Healy, and Simón Castro. In 79 games for Nashville, he batted .231/.299/.434 with 10 home runs and 49 RBI. McBride elected free agency following the season on November 6.

=== Philadelphia Phillies ===
On January 3, 2018, McBride signed a minor league contract that included an invitation to spring training with the Philadelphia Phillies. He played in 60 games for the Triple–A Lehigh Valley IronPigs hitting .242/.333/.479 with 10 home runs and 26 RBI. McBride elected free agency following the season on November 2.

On December 21, 2018, McBride re-signed with the Phillies on a minor league contract. In 2019, he played with the IronPigs and batted .225/.272/.444 with 9 home runs and 28 RBI in 151 at bats, as he played 25 games at first base, 9 at catcher, 2 in right field, and one as a pitcher. McBride elected free agency following the season on November 4.

McBride chose to retire from professional baseball in early 2020 and began a career in financial planning.

== Achievements ==
McBride garnered the following achievements in his minor league career:

- Arizona Fall League All-Prospect Team (2009, 2010)
- New York–Penn League Mid-Season All-Star (2006)
- Pacific Coast League Mid-Season All-Star (2012, 2015)
- Pacific Coast League Post-Season All-Star (2012)
- South Atlantic League Mid-Season All-Star (2007)
- Topps Eastern League Player of the Month (2010)
