= Alex White (baseball) =

American baseball player (born 1988)

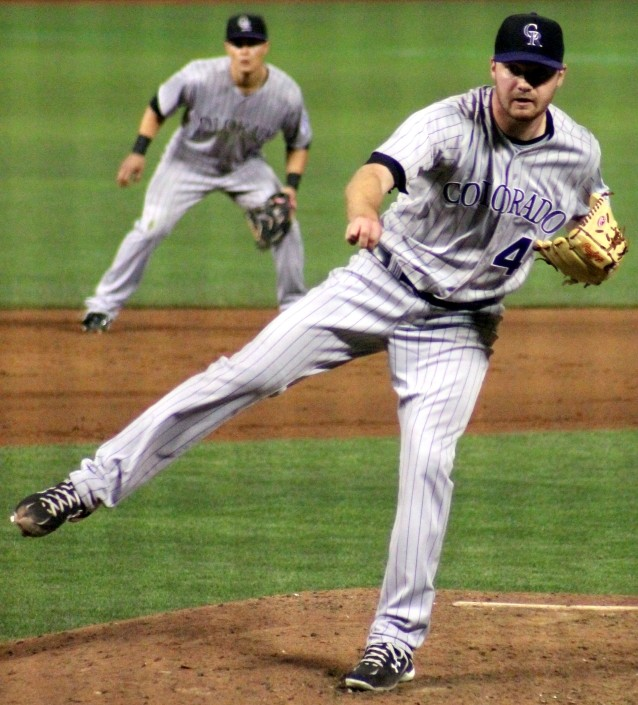
- White pitching for the Colorado Rockies in 2011
- Pitcher
- Born: August 29, 1988 (age 38); Greenville, North Carolina, U.S.
- Batted: Right Threw: Right

MLB debut
- April 30, 2011, for the Cleveland Indians

Last MLB appearance
- September 30, 2012, for the Colorado Rockies

MLB statistics
- Win–loss record: 5–13
- Earned run average: 6.03
- Strikeouts: 101
- Stats at Baseball Reference

Teams
- Cleveland Indians (2011); Colorado Rockies (2011–2012)

Alex Bruce White (born August 29, 1988) is an American former professional baseball pitcher. He played in Major League Baseball (MLB) for the Cleveland Indians and the Colorado Rockies.

== Amateur career ==
White attended D. H. Conley High School in Greenville, North Carolina, where he helped lead the school's baseball team to two state championships. After his senior year of high school, he attended the University of North Carolina, where he played college baseball for the North Carolina Tar Heels. In 2007 and 2008, he played collegiate summer baseball with the Chatham A's of the Cape Cod Baseball League.

== Professional career ==
=== Cleveland Indians ===
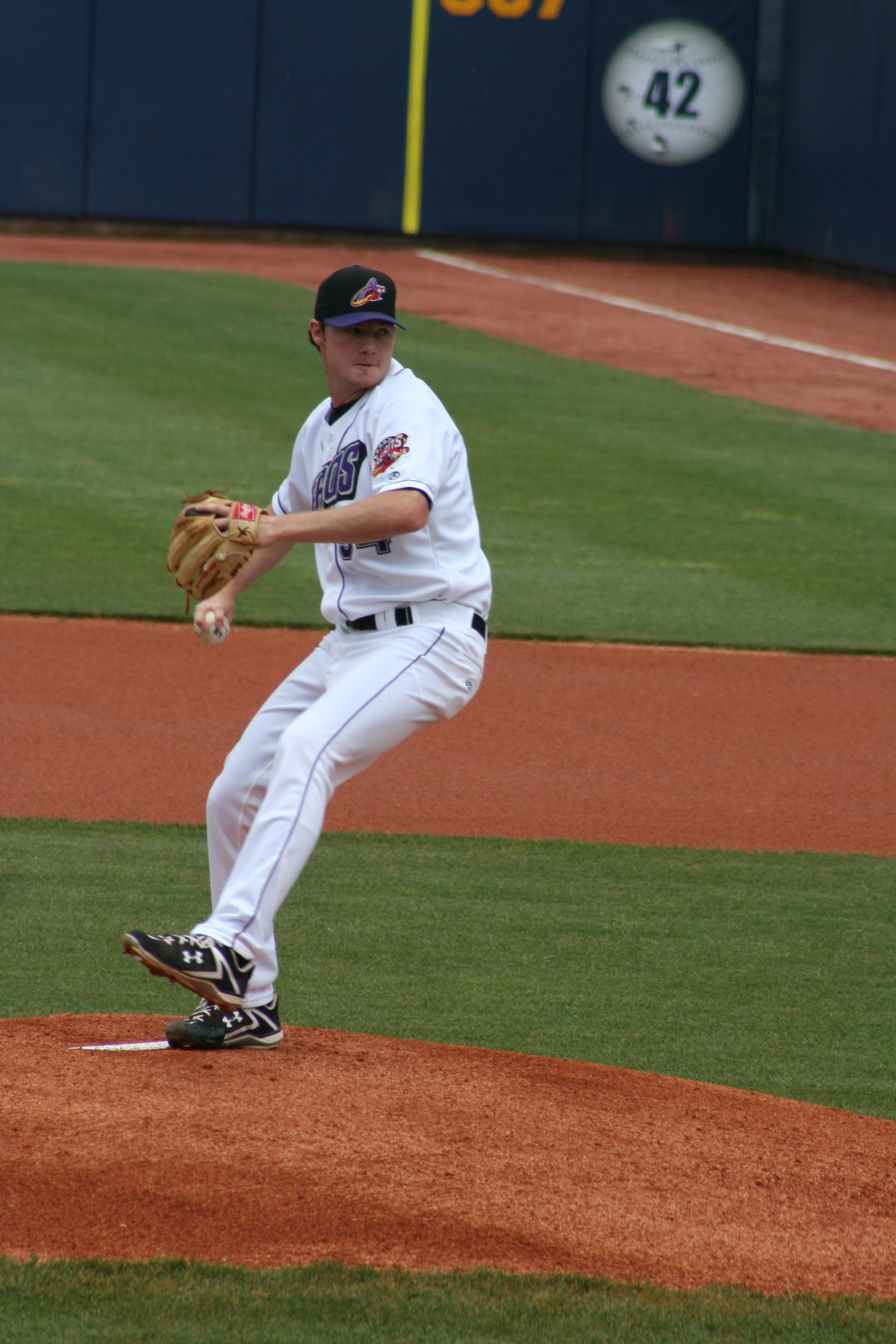
Alex White pitching for the Akron Aeros in 2010.

White was drafted by the Cleveland Indians in the first round of the 2009 Major League Baseball draft out of North Carolina. He was considered one of the top prospects in baseball.

White made his major league debut on April 30, 2011 against the Detroit Tigers. He'd continue on for 2 more starts, going 1–0 in 15 innings.

=== Colorado Rockies ===
On July 30, 2011, White was traded to the Colorado Rockies with Drew Pomeranz, Matt McBride, and minor leaguer Joe Gardner for Ubaldo Jiménez. With the Rockies, White did not enjoy his half season of 2011 with Colorado, as his ERA sat at 8.42 in 7 starts, he also surrendered 12 home runs in just 36.1 innings.

On September 10, 2012, White hit his first career home run off Ryan Vogelsong of the San Francisco Giants. In 23 games (20 starts) for the Rockies, White finished the season with a record of 2–9 in 98 innings.

=== Houston Astros ===
On December 4, 2012, White was traded to the Houston Astros with minor leaguer Alex Gillingham for Wilton López and a player to be named later or cash from the Astros. The player was later named as outfielder Jose Monzon.

On April 11, 2013, White underwent Tommy John surgery causing him to miss the rest of the 2013 season.

On April 7, 2015, White was designated for assignment. White was released by the team on June 8, 2015.

=== Atlanta Braves ===
On June 12, 2015, White signed a minor league contract with the Atlanta Braves. In 8 games (7 starts) for the Triple–A Gwinnett Braves, he posted a 4.31 ERA with 26 strikeouts across 39 2/3 innings pitched. White was released by the Braves organization on July 19.

=== Sioux City Explorers ===
On May 4, 2017, White signed with the Sioux City Explorers of the American Association. He was released on August 1, 2017. He appeared in 7 games (5 starts) throwing 24.1 innings going 0-2 with a 7.77 ERA and 20 strikeouts.

=== Southern Maryland Blue Crabs ===
On June 16, 2018, White signed with the Southern Maryland Blue Crabs of the Atlantic League of Professional Baseball. He was released on June 29, 2018. He appeared in 2 games (1 start) throwing 3.1 innings going 0-0 with a 21.60 ERA and 5 strikeouts.

== Personal life ==
White was arrested for suspicion of driving under the influence of alcohol in March 2012.
