= Josh Roenicke =

American baseball player (born 1982)

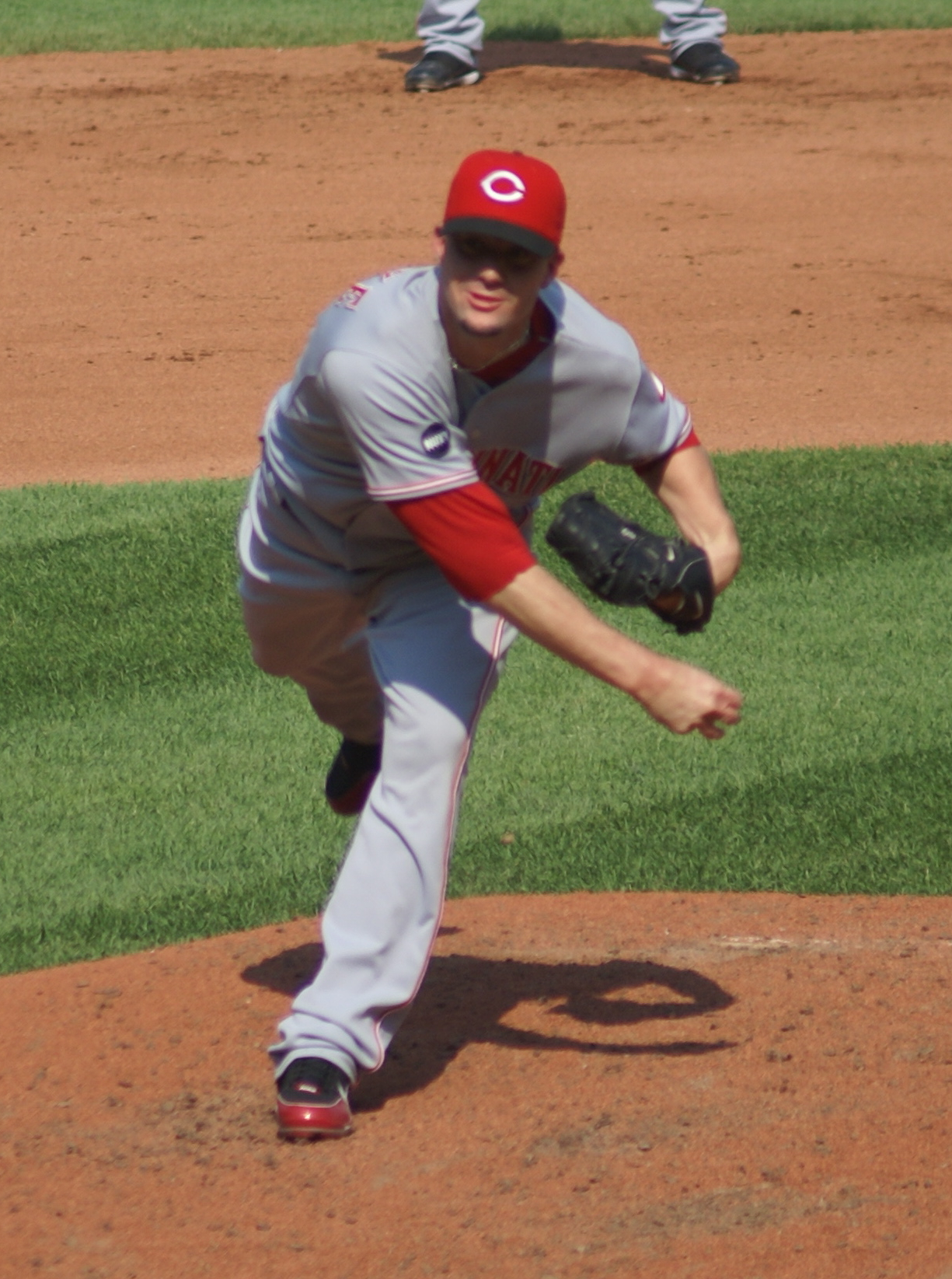
- Roenicke with the Cincinnati Reds
- Relief pitcher
- Born: August 4, 1982 (age 44); Baltimore, Maryland, U.S.
- Batted: Right Threw: Right

Professional debut
- MLB: September 13, 2008, for the Cincinnati Reds
- CPBL: March 28, 2018, for the Uni-President Lions

Last appearance
- MLB: September 26, 2013, for the Minnesota Twins
- CPBL: August 7, 2020, for the Uni-President Lions

MLB statistics
- Win–loss record: 8–3
- Earned run average: 4.17
- Strikeouts: 168

CPBL statistics
- Win–loss record: 22–20
- Earned run average: 3.67
- Strikeouts: 275
- Stats at Baseball Reference

Teams
- Cincinnati Reds (2008–2009); Toronto Blue Jays (2009–2010); Colorado Rockies (2011–2012); Minnesota Twins (2013); Uni-President Lions (2018–2020)

Joshua James Roenicke (born August 4, 1982) is an American former professional baseball pitcher. He played in Major League Baseball (MLB) for the Cincinnati Reds, Toronto Blue Jays, Colorado Rockies, and Minnesota Twins, and in the Chinese Professional Baseball League (CPBL) for the Uni-President Lions.

== Career ==
=== Cincinnati Reds ===
Roenicke was drafted by the Cincinnati Reds in the 10th round of the 2006 Major League Baseball draft out of UCLA where he was both an outfielder and a relief pitcher, as well as a defensive back and kick returner on the UCLA football team. Beginning his professional career with the Gulf Coast Reds, Roenicke pitched 8 innings and gave up only one run. He was promoted to the Rookie level Billings Mustangs where he finished 2006. He began 2007 with the High-A Sarasota Reds before being promoted to Double-A Chattanooga. Combined, he had a 3–2 record with a 2.31 ERA, 56 strikeouts, and 24 saves. Roenicke remained in Chattanooga to begin 2008, but was promoted to Triple-A Louisville after 22 appearances. In 35 games for Louisville, he had a 2.54 ERA and was promoted to the majors on September 9.

Roenicke made his major league debut on September 13, walking, striking out, and hitting 1 batter each.

=== Toronto Blue Jays ===
On July 31, 2009, he was traded to the Toronto Blue Jays along with Edwin Encarnación and Zach Stewart, in exchange for Scott Rolen and cash considerations. He made 13 appearances down the stretch for Toronto, recording a 7.13 ERA with 19 strikeouts across 17 2/3 innings pitched.

Roenicke made 16 relief outings for the Blue Jays in 2010, registering a 1–0 record and 5.68 ERA with 18 strikeouts over 19 innings of work: He began the 2011 campaign with the Triple-A Las Vegas 51s, but struggled to a 1–3 record and 6.04 ERA with 20 strikeouts in 16 games.

=== Colorado Rockies ===
On June 2, 2011, Roenicke was claimed off waivers by the Colorado Rockies and was optioned to Triple-A Colorado Springs. He made 19 appearances down the stretch for Colorado, recording a 3.78 ERA with 12 strikeouts across 16 2/3 innings pitched.

Roenicke pitched in 63 games (all in relief) for the Rockies during the 2012 campaign, accumulating a 4–2 record and 3.25 ERA with 54 strikeouts and one save across 88 2/3 innings pitched.

=== Minnesota Twins ===
On November 2, 2012, Roenicke was claimed off of waivers by the Minnesota Twins. He made 63 relief appearances for the Twins in 2013, logging a 3–1 record and 4.35 ERA with 45 strikeouts and one save over 62 innings of work. On October 2, 2013, Roenicke was removed from the 40-man roster and sent outright to the Triple-A Rochester Red Wings.

=== Washington Nationals ===
On February 14, 2014, Roenicke signed a minor league contract with the Washington Nationals that included an invitation to spring training. He made 23 appearances (15 starts) for the Triple-A Syracuse Chiefs, registering a 4–6 record and 5.45 ERA with 37 strikeouts across 79 1/3 innings pitched. Roenicke was released by the Nationals organization on August 4.

=== Colorado Rockies (second stint) ===
Roenicke signed a minor league contract with the Colorado Rockies on August 12, 2014. He pitched in six games for their Triple-A affiliate, the Colorado Springs Sky Sox.

=== Milwaukee Brewers ===
Roenicke signed a minor league contract with the Milwaukee Brewers on February 12, 2015. He was 7–12 with a 6.15 ERA for the Triple–A Colorado Springs SkySox.

=== Los Angeles Angels of Anaheim ===
Roenicke signed a minor league contract with the Los Angeles Angels of Anaheim on March 7, 2016. He split the year between the High–A Inland Empire 66ers, Double–A Arkansas Travelers, and Triple–A Salt Lake Bees, accumulating a 3.80 ERA with 49 strikeouts across 31 relief appearances. Roenicke elected free agency following the season on November 7.

=== Pericos de Puebla ===
On February 21, 2017, Roenicke signed with the Pericos de Puebla of the Mexican League. He finished the season with a 7–5 record and a 2.70 ERA in 20 starts for the Pericos, getting selected to the Mexican League All-Star Game (South Division) and carrying the club to its second consecutive championship appearance.

=== Uni-President Lions ===
On February 9, 2018, Roenicke signed with the Uni-President Lions of the Chinese Professional Baseball League. In 26 starts, Roenicke posted a league-leading 3.17 ERA across 156 innings pitched. He re-signed with the Uni-Lions for the 2019 season. Roenicke recorded a 3.50 ERA and 1.17 WHIP over 105 1/3 innings. He later re-signed with the team for the 2020 season. Roenicke was released on August 30, 2020, after tearing a ligament in his pitching elbow.

== Pitching style ==
Roenicke threw five pitches. He had a four-seam fastball thrown at 91–95 mph, a two-seam fastball at 91–94, a slider (82–86), a curveball (76–79), and an occasional changeup (83–85). He did not use his changeup against right-handed hitters. His primary fastball against righties was the four-seamer, while he leaned toward the two-seamer against lefties. Despite average to above-average whiff rates on his pitches, he struck hitters out at a rate well below one per inning.

== Personal life ==
Roenicke, who grew up in Nevada City, California, comes from a baseball family as his brother Jason played in Toronto's minor league system in 2008–2009, his father Gary played 12 major league seasons from 1976 to 1988 and is currently a scout in the Baltimore Orioles organization, and his uncle Ron played 8 seasons from 1981 to 1988 and was previously the manager of the Milwaukee Brewers from 2011 to 2015 and the Boston Red Sox in 2020.

Roenicke is the brother-in-law of former Colorado Rockies outfielder Ian Desmond, having married Desmond's sister Nikki in 2010.

== See also ==
- List of second-generation Major League Baseball players
