= Christian Friedrich (baseball) =

American baseball player (born 1987)

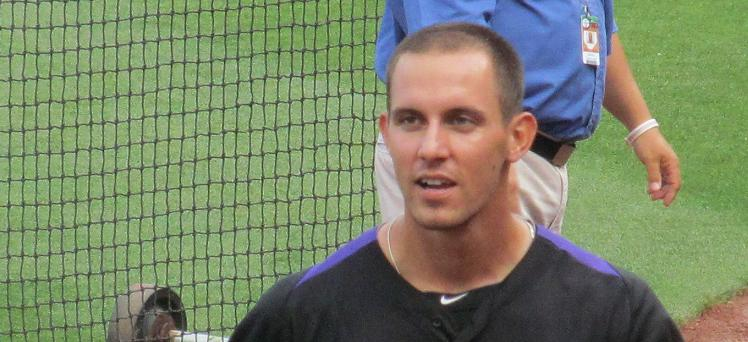
- Friedrich on June 18, 2012
- Pitcher
- Born: July 8, 1987 (age 38); Evanston, Illinois, U.S.
- Batted: Right Threw: Left

Professional debut
- MLB: May 9, 2012, for the Colorado Rockies
- KBO: July 12, 2019, for the NC Dinos

Last appearance
- MLB: September 29, 2016, for the San Diego Padres
- KBO: September 25, 2019, for the NC Dinos

MLB statistics
- Win–loss record: 10–28
- Earned run average: 5.37
- Strikeouts: 246

KBO statistics
- Win–loss record: 7-4
- Earned run average: 2.75
- Strikeouts: 56
- Stats at Baseball Reference

Teams
- Colorado Rockies (2012, 2014–2015); San Diego Padres (2016); NC Dinos (2019)

Christian Louis Patrick Friedrich (born July 8, 1987) is an American former professional baseball pitcher. He made his Major League Baseball (MLB) debut with the Colorado Rockies in 2012 and also played with the San Diego Padres. Friedrich also pitched in the KBO League for the NC Dinos.

== Career ==
=== Amateur ===
Friedrich attended Loyola Academy in Wilmette, Illinois, and Eastern Kentucky University, where he played for the Eastern Kentucky Colonels baseball team. He was named a Baseball America Freshman All-American in 2006. In 2007, he played collegiate summer baseball with the Falmouth Commodores of the Cape Cod Baseball League and was named a league all-star. He was also named a second-team All-American in 2008.

=== Colorado Rockies ===
Friedrich was drafted by the Colorado Rockies in the first round, with the 25th overall selection, of the 2008 Major League Baseball draft. Baseball America ranked Friedrich as the #95 best prospect in baseball prior to the 2009 season and the 33rd best prior to the 2010 season.

The Rockies added Friedrich to their 40-man roster after the 2011 season to protect him from the Rule 5 draft. He was called up on May 7, 2012, to make his major league debut against the San Diego Padres on May 9, 2012. On August 3, it was announced that an MRI revealed a stress fracture in his lower back, ending his season. Friedrich was 5–8 with a 6.17 earned run average in 16 starts, and had 74 strikeouts in 84 2/3 innings.

Colorado designated Friedrich for assignment on January 28, 2016. He was claimed by the Los Angeles Angels of Anaheim on February 5. On February 19, the claim was reversed, and Friedrich was sent back to the Rockies.

=== San Diego Padres ===
Friedrich signed with the San Diego Padres on March 3, 2016. The Padres promoted him to the major leagues on May 13. In a debut game against the Arizona Diamondbacks, center fielder Chris Owings shot a fastball straight back up the middle, knocking off Friedrich's glove. The left-hander raced over to the ball and made the bare-handed toss to first for the out.

In a game against his former team, the Colorado Rockies, on Saturday, September 10, 2016, Friedrich led the Padres to a 6–3 victory while striking out a career-high tying 10 batters. Friedrich shrugged off a 109-mph DJ LeMahieu line drive that drilled him in the left leg during the third inning to work seven shutout innings.

Friedrich became a free agent on October 30, 2017, after the team outrighted him due to sustained injuries.

=== New Britain Bees ===
On March 26, 2019, Friedrich signed with the New Britain Bees of the independent Atlantic League of Professional Baseball. In 11 starts for the Bees, he posted a 5–1 record and 3.00 ERA with 63 strikeouts across 63 innings pitched.

=== NC Dinos ===
On July 2, 2019, Friedrich's contract was purchased by the NC Dinos of the KBO League. He became a free agent following the season.

On November 5, 2019, Friedrich re-signed with the New Britain Bees. However, following their move to the Futures Collegiate Baseball League, he was selected by the Somerset Patriots in the Bees dispersal draft.

=== Chicago White Sox ===
On February 25, 2020, Friedrich signed a minor league contract with the Chicago White Sox. He did not play in a game in 2020 due to the cancellation of the minor league season because of the COVID-19 pandemic. Friedrich was released by the organization on June 18.

=== Lexington Legends ===
On June 29, 2021, Friedrich signed with the Lexington Legends of the Atlantic League of Professional Baseball. In 3 appearances for Lexington, he registered a 6.17 ERA and 12 strikeouts over 11 2/3 innings.

=== Chicago Dogs ===
On August 7, 2021, Friedrich was traded to the Chicago Dogs of the American Association of Professional Baseball in exchange for two players to be named later and cash considerations. Friedrich appeared in 6 games for Chicago to close out the year, logging a 3–1 record and 4.21 ERA with 30 strikeouts in 36 1/3 innings pitched. On April 19, 2022, Friedrich was released by the team.
