= 2011 Colorado Rockies season =

2011 Colorado Rockies
- League: National League
- Division: West
- Ballpark: Coors Field
- City: Denver, Colorado
- Record: 73–89 (.451)
- Divisional place: 4th
- Owners: Charles & Richard Monfort
- General manager: Dan O'Dowd
- Manager: Jim Tracy
- Television: Root Sports Rocky Mountain; Drew Goodman, George Frazier, Jeff Huson
- Radio: KOA (English); Jack Corrigan, Jerry Schemmel KMXA (Spanish)
- Stats: ESPN.com; Baseball Reference

The Colorado Rockies' 2011 season, the franchise's 19th in Major League Baseball, was a season in American baseball. They did not return to the postseason for the third time in five years after also missing in 2010.

== Offseason ==
- November 16, 2010: Manuel Corpas was released by the Colorado Rockies.
- November 18, 2010: Clint Barmes was traded by the Colorado Rockies to the Houston Astros for Felipe Paulino.
- December 2, 2010: José López was traded by the Seattle Mariners to the Colorado Rockies for Chaz Roe.
- December 7, 2010: Ty Wigginton was signed as a free agent by the Colorado Rockies.
- December 23, 2010: Matt Lindstrom was traded by the Houston Astros to the Colorado Rockies for Jonnathan Aristil (minors) and Wes Musick (minors).
- January 24, 2011: Clayton Mortensen was traded by the Oakland Athletics to the Colorado Rockies for Ethan Hollingsworth (minors).

== Regular season ==
=== Season standings ===
==== National League West ====
NL West
Team	W	L	Pct.	GB	Home	Road
Arizona Diamondbacks	94	68	.580	—	51‍–‍30	43‍–‍38
San Francisco Giants	86	76	.531	8	46‍–‍35	40‍–‍41
Los Angeles Dodgers	82	79	.509	11½	42‍–‍39	40‍–‍40
Colorado Rockies	73	89	.451	21	38‍–‍43	35‍–‍46
San Diego Padres	71	91	.438	23	35‍–‍46	36‍–‍45

==== National League Wild Card ====
Division leaders
Team	W	L	Pct.
Philadelphia Phillies	102	60	.630
Milwaukee Brewers	96	66	.593
Arizona Diamondbacks	94	68	.580

Wild Card team (Top team qualifies for postseason)
Team	W	L	Pct.	GB
St. Louis Cardinals	90	72	.556	—
Atlanta Braves	89	73	.549	1
San Francisco Giants	86	76	.531	4
Los Angeles Dodgers	82	79	.509	7½
Washington Nationals	80	81	.497	9½
Cincinnati Reds	79	83	.488	11
New York Mets	77	85	.475	13
Colorado Rockies	73	89	.451	17
Florida Marlins	72	90	.444	18
Pittsburgh Pirates	72	90	.444	18
Chicago Cubs	71	91	.438	19
San Diego Padres	71	91	.438	19
Houston Astros	56	106	.346	34

=== Transactions ===
- May 19, 2011: Franklin Morales was sold by the Colorado Rockies to the Boston Red Sox.
- May 26, 2011: Felipe Paulino was sold by the Colorado Rockies to the Kansas City Royals.
- June 7, 2011: José López was released by the Colorado Rockies.
- June 30, 2011: Mark Ellis was traded by the Oakland Athletics to the Colorado Rockies for Bruce Billings and a player to be named later. The Colorado Rockies sent Eliezer Mesa (minors) (September 30, 2011) to the Oakland Athletics to complete the trade.
- July 30, 2011: Ubaldo Jiménez was traded by the Colorado Rockies to the Cleveland Indians for Alex White, Matt McBride, Joe Gardner (minors), and a player to be named later. The Cleveland Indians sent Drew Pomeranz (August 16, 2011) to the Colorado Rockies to complete the trade.
- August 8, 2011: Kevin Millwood was signed as a free agent by the Colorado Rockies.
- August 23, 2011: Kevin Kouzmanoff was traded by the Oakland Athletics to the Colorado Rockies for a player to be named or cash.

=== Major League debuts ===
- Batters:
  - Charlie Blackmon (Jun 7)
  - Cole Garner (Jul 4)
  - Jordan Pacheco (Sep 6)
  - Wilin Rosario (Sep 6)
  - Tommy Field (Sep 11)
  - Héctor Gómez (Sep 16)
- Pitchers:
  - Alan Johnson (Apr 17)
  - Bruce Billings (May 27)
  - Juan Nicasio (May 28)
  - Rex Brothers (Jun 6)
  - Drew Pomeranz (Sep 11)

=== Roster ===
2011 Colorado Rockies
Roster
Pitchers: 34 Matt Belisle; 63 Rafael Betancourt; 41 Bruce Billings; 49 Rex Brothers; 45 Jhoulys Chacín; 28 Aaron Cook; 31 Matt Daley; 29 Jorge de la Rosa; 61 Edgmer Escalona; 38 Édgar González; 46 Jason Hammel; 38 Ubaldo Jiménez; 47 Alan Johnson; 27 Matt Lindstrom; 50 Jim Miller; 40 Kevin Millwood; 56 Franklin Morales; 59 Clayton Mortensen; 44 Juan Nicasio; 55 Felipe Paulino; 47 Drew Pomeranz; 37 Greg Reynolds; 51 Matt Reynolds; 56 Josh Roenicke; 48 Esmil Rogers; 32 J. C. Romero; 16 Huston Street; 54 Eric Stults; 43 Alex White	Catchers: 55 Eliézer Alfonzo; 20 Chris Iannetta; 26 José Morales; 15 Matt Pagnozzi; 12 Wilin Rosario; Infielders: 99 Alfredo Amézaga; 14 Mark Ellis; 6 Tommy Field; 23 Jason Giambi; 22 Héctor Gómez; 17 Todd Helton; 18 Jonathan Herrera; 15 Kevin Kouzmanoff; 22 José López; 10 Chris Nelson; 58 Jordan Pacheco; 9 Ian Stewart; 2 Troy Tulowitzki; 21 Ty Wigginton; Outfielders: 8 Charlie Blackmon; 24 Dexter Fowler; 41 Cole Garner; 5 Carlos González; 7 Seth Smith; 19 Ryan Spilborghs; 1 Eric Young, Jr.	Manager: 4 Jim Tracy; Coaches: 36 Bob Apodaca (pitching); 25 Rich Dauer (third base); 30 Glenallen Hill (first base); 13 Carney Lansford (hitting); 11 Tom Runnells (bench); 52 Jim Wright (bullpen)

=== Game log ===
Legend
Rockies Win	Rockies Loss	Game postponed

Please do not edit this line: OgreBot Begin-->

2011 Game Log
April (17–8)

#	Date	Opponent	Score	Win	Loss	Save	Attendance	Record
1	April 1	Diamondbacks	7–6 (11)	Demel (1–0)	M. Reynolds (0–1)	Putz (1)	49,374	0–1
2	April 2	Diamondbacks	3–1	de la Rosa (1–0)	Hudson (0–1)	Street (1)	40,216	1–1
–	April 3	Diamondbacks	Postponed (rain/snow) Rescheduled for May 24					
3	April 5	Dodgers	3–0	Chacín (1–0)	Kershaw (1–1)	Street (2)	24,693	2–1
4	April 6	Dodgers	7–5	Hammel (1–0)	Billingsley (1–1)	Street (3)	22,595	3–1
5	April 7	@ Pirates	7–1	Rogers (1–0)	Maholm (0–1)		39,219	4–1
6	April 8	@ Pirates	4–3 (14)	Olson (1–1)	Morales (0–1)		29,192	4–2
7	April 9	@ Pirates	6–4	Belisle (1–0)	Veras (0–1)	Lindstrom (1)	25,398	5–2
8	April 10	@ Pirates	6–5	Chacín (2–0)	Crotta (0–1)	Street (4)	18,043	6–2
9	April 11	@ Mets	7–6	Belisle (2–0)	Parnell (0–1)	Street (5)	24,865	7–2
–	April 12	@ Mets	Postponed (rain) Rescheduled for April 14					
10	April 13	@ Mets	5–4	Rogers (2–0)	Niese (0–2)	Street (6)	25,878	8–2
11	April 14	@ Mets	6–5	G. Reynolds (1–0)	Dickey (1–2)	Lindstrom (2)		9–2
12	April 14	@ Mets	9–4	de la Rosa (2–0)	Capuano (1–1)		25,758	10–2
13	April 15	Cubs	5–0	Chacín (3–0)	Garza (0–2)		30,285	11–2
14	April 16	Cubs	8–3	Coleman (1–0)	Hammel (1–1)		40,264	11–3
15	April 17	Cubs	9–5	Betancourt (1–0)	Mateo (0–1)		42,212	12–3
16	April 18	Giants	8–1	Lincecum (2–1)	Rogers (2–1)		31,079	12–4
17	April 19	Giants	6–3	Sánchez (2–1)	Jiménez (0–1)	Wilson (5)	30,320	12–5
18	April 20	Giants	10–2	de la Rosa (3–0)	Cain (2–1)		27,758	13–5
19	April 22	@ Marlins	4–1	Sánchez (1–1)	Chacín (3–1)		15,069	13–6
20	April 23	@ Marlins	3–1	Hammel (2–1)	Vázquez (1–2)	Street (7)	35,381	14–6
21	April 24	@ Marlins	6–3	Dunn (1–0)	Belisle (2–1)	Núñez (6)	11,442	14–7
22	April 25	@ Cubs	5–3	Rogers (3–1)	Garza (0–3)	Street (8)	37,417	15–7
23	April 26	@ Cubs	4–3	de la Rosa (4–0)	Russell (1–3)	Street (9)	38,261	16–7
–	April 27	@ Cubs	Postponed (rain) Rescheduled for June 27					
24	April 29	Pirates	3–0	Correia (4–2)	Chacín (3–2)	Hanrahan (8)	34,477	16–8
25	April 30	Pirates	4–1	Hammel (3–1)	Maholm (1–4)	Street (10)	33,684	17–8

May (8–21)

#	Date	Opponent	Score	Win	Loss	Save	Attendance	Record
26	May 1	Pirates	8–4	Morton (3–1)	Jiménez (0–2)		35,012	17–9
27	May 3	@ Diamondbacks	4–3	Hernandez (1–0)	Paulino (0–1)	Putz (7)	18,887	17–10
28	May 4	@ Diamondbacks	6–4	Chacín (4–2)	Enright (1–3)	Street (11)	18,803	18–10
29	May 5	@ Diamondbacks	3–2 (11)	Hernandez (2–0)	Belisle (2–2)		18,695	18–11
30	May 6	@ Giants	4–3	Wilson (1–1)	Paulino (0–2)		41,982	18–12
31	May 7	@ Giants	3–2	Wilson (2–1)	Paulino (0–3)		41,611	18–13
32	May 8	@ Giants	3–0	Vogelsong (2–0)	de la Rosa (4–1)	Wilson (11)	42,132	18–14
33	May 9	Mets	2–1	Belisle (3–2)	Capuano (2–4)	Street (12)	31,885	19–14
34	May 10	Mets	4–3	Pelfrey (3–3)	Hammel (3–2)	Rodríguez (10)	31,007	19–15
–	May 11	Mets	Postponed (rain) Rescheduled for May 12					
35	May 12	Mets	9–5	Niese (2–4)	Jiménez (0–3)		21,422	19–16
36	May 13	Padres	12–7	de la Rosa (5–1)	Moseley (1–5)		40,278	20–16
37	May 14	Padres	9–7	Adams (2–0)	Street (0–1)	Bell (9)	34,252	20–17
38	May 15	Padres	8–2	Latos (1–5)	Hammel (3–3)		38,109	20–18
39	May 16	Giants	7–4	Mortensen (1–0)	Lincecum (3–4)	Street (13)	33,228	21–18
40	May 17	Giants	5–3	Belisle (4–2)	Sánchez (3–3)	Street (14)	41,105	22–18
41	May 18	@ Phillies	2–1	Hamels (5–2)	de la Rosa (5–2)	Madson (7)	44,665	22–19
42	May 19	@ Phillies	7–1	Chacín (5–2)	Kendrick (3–3)		45,425	23–19
43	May 20	@ Brewers	7–6 (14)	McClendon (1–0)	Paulino (0–4)		33,361	23–20
44	May 21	@ Brewers	3–2	Marcum (6–1)	Mortensen (1–1)	Axford (11)	42,240	23–21
45	May 22	@ Brewers	3–1	Wolf (4–4)	Jiménez (0–4)	Axford (12)	42,605	23–22
46	May 24	Diamondbacks	12–4	G. Reynolds (2–0)	Collmenter (3–1)		26,378	24–22
47	May 24	Diamondbacks	5–2	Saunders (1–5)	Chacín (5–3)	Putz (13)	25,096	24–23
48	May 25	Diamondbacks	2–1	Kennedy (6–1)	Hammel (3–4)	Putz (14)	26,972	24–24
49	May 26	Diamondbacks	6–3	Owings (1–0)	Mortensen (1–2)	Hernandez (1)	30,186	24–25
50	May 27	Cardinals	10–3	Westbrook (5–3)	Jiménez (0–5)		31,285	24–26
51	May 28	Cardinals	15–4	Nicasio (1–0)	García (5–1)		38,149	25–26
52	May 29	Cardinals	4–3	Lohse (7–2)	Chacín (5–4)	Salas (9)	40,598	25–27
53	May 30	@ Dodgers	7–1	Billingsley (4–4)	Hammel (3–5)		36,962	25–28
54	May 31	@ Dodgers	8–2	Lilly (4–4)	Mortensen (1–3)		31,473	25–29

June (14–13)

#	Date	Opponent	Score	Win	Loss	Save	Attendance	Record
55	June 1	@ Dodgers	3–0	Jiménez (1–5)	Garland (1–5)		36,975	26–29
56	June 3	@ Giants	3–1	Cain (4–4)	Nicasio (1–1)	Wilson (16)	41,021	26–30
57	June 4	@ Giants	2–1	Chacín (6–4)	Bumgarner (2–7)	Street (15)	41,046	27–30
58	June 5	@ Giants	2–1	Vogelsong (4–1)	Lindstrom (0–1)	Wilson (17)	41,369	27–31
59	June 6	@ Padres	3–0	Mortensen (2–3)	Richard (2–7)	Street (16)	16,838	28–31
60	June 7	@ Padres	2–0	Stauffer (2–4)	Jiménez (1–6)	Bell (17)	17,732	28–32
61	June 8	@ Padres	5–3	Lindstrom (1–1)	Bell (2–2)	Street (17)	17,220	29–32
62	June 9	Dodgers	9–7	Betancourt (2–0)	Elbert (0–1)	Street (18)	26,066	30–32
63	June 10	Dodgers	6–5	Chacín (7–4)	Billingsley (5–5)	Street (19)	32,116	31–32
64	June 11	Dodgers	11–7	Lilly (5–5)	Hammel (3–6)		34,290	31–33
65	June 12	Dodgers	10–8	De La Rosa (3–0)	Jiménez (1–7)	Elbert (1)	32,650	31–34
66	June 13	Padres	3–1	Bass (1–0)	Cook (0–1)	Bell (18)	32,395	31–35
67	June 14	Padres	6–3	Nicasio (2–1)	LeBlanc (0–2)		35,045	32–35
68	June 15	Padres	6–3	Chacín (8–4)	Latos (4–8)		35,877	33–35
69	June 17	Tigers	13–6	Hammel (4–6)	Porcello (6–5)		41,594	34–35
70	June 18	Tigers	5–4	Jiménez (2–7)	Coke (1–7)	Street (20)	48,555	35–35
71	June 19	Tigers	9–1	Verlander (9–3)	Cook (0–2)		49,015	35–36
72	June 20	@ Indians	8–7	Lindstrom (2–1)	Carmona (4–9)	Street (21)	15,224	36–36
73	June 21	@ Indians	4–3	Belisle (5–2)	Perez (2–3)	Street (22)	15,877	37–36
74	June 22	@ Indians	4–3	Tomlin (9–4)	Hammel (4–7)	Perez (18)	17,568	37–37
75	June 24	@ Yankees	4–2	Jiménez (3–7)	Burnett (7–6)	Street (23)	46,028	38–37
76	June 25	@ Yankees	8–3	Sabathia (10–4)	Cook (0–3)		46,900	38–38
77	June 26	@ Yankees	6–4	Logan (2–2)	Belisle (5–3)	Rivera (20)	47,894	38–39
78	June 27	@ Cubs	7–3	Garza (4–6)	Chacín (8–5)		40,854	38–40
79	June 28	White Sox	3–2 (13)	Brothers (1–0)	Ohman (0–1)		40,175	39–40
80	June 29	White Sox	3–2	Bruney (1–0)	Street (0–2)	Santos (16)	35,973	39–41
81	June 30	White Sox	6–4 (10)	Crain (4–2)	Mortensen (2–4)	Santos (17)	38,084	39–42

July (12–15)

#	Date	Opponent	Score	Win	Loss	Save	Attendance	Record
82	July 1	Royals	9–0	Nicasio (3–1)	Duffy (1–3)		48,282	40–42
83	July 2	Royals	9–6	G. Reynolds (3–0)	Davies (1–7)	Street (24)	49,227	41–42
84	July 3	Royals	16–8	Wood (4–0)	Hammel (4–8)		40,269	41–43
85	July 4	@ Braves	4–1	Hanson (10–4)	Jiménez (3–8)	Kimbrel (25)	36,137	41–44
86	July 5	@ Braves	5–3	Lowe (5–6)	Chacín (8–6)	Kimbrel (26)	17,718	41–45
87	July 6	@ Braves	9–1	Jurrjens (12–3)	Cook (0–4)		26,271	41–46
88	July 7	@ Braves	6–3	Hudson (8–6)	Nicasio (3–2)	Kimbrel (27)	21,541	41–47
89	July 8	@ Nationals	3–2	Hammel (5–8)	Lannan (5–6)	Street (25)	19,046	42–47
90	July 9	@ Nationals	2–1	Jiménez (4–8)	Marquis (7–4)	Street (26)	29,441	43–47
91	July 10	@ Nationals	2–0	Zimmermann (6–7)	Chacín (8–7)	Storen (23)	21,186	43–48
92	July 14	Brewers	12–3	Jiménez (5–8)	Gallardo (10–6)		41,088	44–48
93	July 15	Brewers	4–0	Nicasio (4–2)	Narveson (6–6)		35,044	45–48
94	July 16	Brewers	8–7	Rodríguez (3–2)	Street (0–3)	Axford (24)	46,783	45–49
95	July 17	Brewers	4–3	Marcum (8–3)	Cook (0–5)	Axford (25)	35,030	45–50
96	July 18	Braves	7–4	Lowe (6–7)	Hammel (5–9)	Kimbrel (29)	35,103	45–51
97	July 19	Braves	12–3	Jiménez (6–8)	Beachy (3–2)		36,460	46–51
98	July 20	Braves	3–2	Street (1–3)	O'Flaherty (1–3)		39,339	47–51
99	July 21	Braves	9–6	Hanson (11–5)	M. Reynolds (0–2)	Kimbrel (30)	39,262	47–52
100	July 22	@ Diamondbacks	8–4	Cook (1–5)	Hudson (10–6)		22,768	48–52
101	July 23	@ Diamondbacks	12–3	Collmenter (6–5)	Hammel (5–10)		34,849	48–53
102	July 24	@ Diamondbacks	7–0	Owings (4–0)	Jiménez (6–9)	Duke (1)	28,090	48–54
103	July 25	@ Dodgers	8–5	De La Rosa (4–4)	Nicasio (4–3)	Guerra (8)	28,860	48–55
104	July 26	@ Dodgers	3–2	Kershaw (12–4)	Chacín (8–8)	Jansen (2)	50,664	48–56
105	July 27	@ Dodgers	3–1	Cook (2–5)	Kuroda (6–13)	Street (27)	29,976	49–56
106	July 29	@ Padres	3–2	Hammel (6–10)	Stauffer (6–8)	Street (28)	27,612	50–56
107	July 30	@ Padres	10–6	Rogers (4–1)	Harang (9–3)		37,034	51–56
108	July 31	@ Padres	8–3	Qualls (5–5)	Brothers (1–1)		22,516	51–57

August (13–16)

#	Date	Opponent	Score	Win	Loss	Save	Attendance	Record
109	August 1	Phillies	4–3 (10)	Bastardo (5–0)	Brothers (1–2)	Madson (19)	39,330	51–58
110	August 2	Phillies	5–0	Kendrick (6–5)	Cook (2–6)		39,128	51–59
111	August 3	Phillies	8–6	Halladay (14–4)	Hammel (6–11)	Lidge (1)	39,404	51–60
112	August 4	Nationals	6–3	Rogers (5–1)	Detwiler (1–1)		35,956	52–60
113	August 5	Nationals	5–3	Zimmermann (7–9)	Nicasio (4–4)	Storen (28)	35,034	52–61
114	August 6	Nationals	15–7	Chacín (9–8)	Hernández (6–11)		43,321	53–61
115	August 7	Nationals	3–2	Clippard (2–0)	Belisle (5–4)	Storen (29)	34,812	53–62
116	August 8	@ Reds	10–7	Belisle (6–4)	Bray (2–2)	Street (29)	27,055	54–62
117	August 9	@ Reds	3–2	Rogers (6–1)	Willis (0–2)	Betancourt (1)	17,378	55–62
118	August 10	@ Reds	3–2	Leake (10–7)	Millwood (0–1)	Cordero (21)	21,673	55–63
119	August 11	@ Reds	2–1	Cueto (8–5)	Chacín (9–9)	Cordero (22)	20,546	55–64
120	August 12	@ Cardinals	6–1	Lohse (10–7)	Cook (2–7)		36,181	55–65
121	August 13	@ Cardinals	6–1	Hammel (7–11)	García (10–6)		40,172	56–65
122	August 14	@ Cardinals	6–2	Jackson (9–8)	Rogers (6–2)		38,748	56–66
123	August 15	Marlins	7–4	Belisle (7–4)	Núñez (1–3)		32,175	57–66
124	August 16	Marlins	6–5	Sánchez (7–6)	Chacín (9–10)	Núñez (33)	36,136	57–67
125	August 17	Marlins	12–5	Cook (3–7)	Nolasco (9–9)		33,522	58–67
126	August 19	Dodgers	8–2	Kuroda (9–14)	Hammel (7–12)		44,984	58–68
127	August 20	Dodgers	7–6 (13)	Romero (1–0)	Hawksworth (2–4)		45,195	59–68
128	August 21	Dodgers	5–3	Millwood (1–1)	Billingsley (10–10)	Betancourt (2)	49,083	60–68
129	August 22	Astros	9–5	Chacín (10–10)	Myers (3–13)	Betancourt (3)	27,166	61–68
130	August 23	Astros	8–6	Belisle (8–4)	Rodriguez (2–2)	Brothers (1)	31,179	62–68
131	August 24	Astros	7–6 (10)	Belisle (9–4)	Rodríguez (1–5)		30,333	63–68
132	August 26	@ Dodgers	6–1	Lilly (8–13)	Rogers (6–3)		38,960	63–69
133	August 27	@ Dodgers	7–6 (11)	MacDougal (1–1)	Hammel (7–13)		35,537	63–70
134	August 28	@ Dodgers	7–6	Chacín (11–10)	Eovaldi (1–2)	Betancourt (4)	38,503	64–70
135	August 29	@ Diamondbacks	5–1	Hudson (14–9)	White (1–1)	Putz (34)	19,478	64–71
136	August 30	@ Diamondbacks	9–4	Miley (2–1)	Cook (3–8)		20,231	64–72
137	August 31	@ Diamondbacks	4–2	Collmenter (9–8)	Rogers (6–4)	Putz (35)	23,062	64–73

September (9–16)

#	Date	Opponent	Score	Win	Loss	Save	Attendance	Record
138	September 2	@ Padres	3–0	Millwood (2–1)	Harang (12–5)	Betancourt (5)	22,070	65–73
139	September 3	@ Padres	5–4	White (2–1)	Luebke (5–8)	Betancourt (6)	23,974	66–73
140	September 4	@ Padres	7–2	Latos (7–13)	Cook (3–9)		24,661	66–74
141	September 5	Diamondbacks	10–7	Miley (3–1)	Rogers (6–5)		40,342	66–75
142	September 6	Diamondbacks	8–3	Belisle (10–4)	Hernandez (4–4)		25,691	67–75
143	September 7	Diamondbacks	5–3	Saunders (10–12)	Millwood (2–2)	Putz (37)	25,320	67–76
144	September 9	Reds	4–1	Bailey (8–7)	Chacín (11–11)	Cordero (32)	40,114	67–77
145	September 10	Reds	12–7	White (3–1)	Maloney (0–2)		38,499	68–77
146	September 11	Reds	4–1	Pomeranz (1–0)	Vólquez (5–5)	Hammel (1)	39,538	69–77
147	September 13	@ Brewers	2–1 (11)	Loe (4–7)	Lindstrom (2–2)		37,120	69–78
148	September 14	@ Brewers	6–2	Millwood (3–2)	Marcum (12–7)		38,302	70–78
149	September 15	Giants	8–5	Vogelsong (11–7)	Chacín (11–12)	Casilla (4)	34,364	70–79
150	September 16	Giants	9–1	Bumgarner (12–12)	White (3–2)		47,302	70–80
151	September 17	Giants	6–5	Joaquín (1–0)	Street (1–4)	Casilla (5)	38,961	70–81
152	September 18	Giants	12–5	Cain (12–10)	Rogers (6–6)		31,875	70–82
153	September 19	Padres	8–2	Luebke (6–9)	Millwood (3–3)		27,450	70–83
154	September 20	Padres	2–1	Latos (8–14)	Chacín (11–13)	Bell (40)	32,465	70–84
155	September 21	Padres	4–0	Bass (2–0)	Cook (3–10)	Bell (41)	31,457	70–85
156	September 22	@ Astros	9–6	Sosa (3–5)	White (3–3)	Melancon (20)	20,773	70–86
157	September 23	@ Astros	11–2	Myers (7–13)	Pomeranz (1–1)		22,467	70–87
158	September 24	@ Astros	4–2 (13)	M. Reynolds (1–2)	Lyles (2–8)	Betancourt (7)	26,209	71–87
159	September 25	@ Astros	19–3	Millwood (4–3)	Harrell (0–2)		21,621	72–87
160	September 26	@ Giants	3–1	Vogelsong (13–7)	Chacín (11–14)	Casilla (6)	41,956	72–88
161	September 27	@ Giants	7–0	Bumgarner (13–13)	White (3–4)		42,370	72–89
162	September 28	@ Giants	6–3	Pomeranz (2–1)	Surkamp (2–2)	Betancourt (8)	41,873	73–89

== Player stats ==
= Indicates team leader

=== Batting ===
==== Starters by position ====
Note: Pos = Position; G = Games played; AB = At bats; H = Hits; Avg. = Batting average; HR = Home runs; RBI = Runs batted in

Pos	Player	G	AB	H	Avg.	HR	RBI
C	Chris Iannetta	112	345	82	.238	14	55
1B	Todd Helton	124	421	127	.302	14	69
2B	Mark Ellis	70	263	72	.274	6	25
SS	Troy Tulowitzki	143	537	162	.302	30	105
3B	Ty Wigginton	130	401	97	.242	15	47
LF	Carlos González	127	481	142	.295	26	92
CF	Dexter Fowler	125	481	128	.266	5	45
RF	Seth Smith	147	476	135	.284	15	59

==== Other batters ====
Note: G = Games played; AB = At bats; H = Hits; Avg. = Batting average; HR = Home runs; RBI = Runs batted in

Player	G	AB	H	Avg.	HR	RBI
Jonathan Herrera	104	281	68	.242	3	14
Ryan Spilborghs	98	200	42	.210	3	22
Eric Young, Jr.	77	198	49	.247	0	10
Chris Nelson	63	180	45	.250	4	16
Jason Giambi	64	131	34	.260	13	32
José López	38	125	26	.208	2	8
Ian Stewart	48	122	19	.156	0	6
Kevin Kouzmanoff	27	98	25	.255	3	16
Charlie Blackmon	27	98	25	.255	1	8
Jordan Pacheco	21	84	24	.286	2	14
Eliézer Alfonzo	25	75	20	.267	1	9
José Morales	22	60	16	.267	0	7
Wilin Rosario	16	54	11	.204	3	8
Tommy Field	16	48	13	.271	0	3
Alfredo Amézaga	20	33	8	.242	0	2
Matt Pagnozzi	7	21	6	.286	0	2
Cole Garner	4	9	2	.222	0	3
Héctor Gómez	2	6	2	.333	0	0

=== Pitching ===
==== Starting pitchers ====
Note: G = Games pitched; IP = Innings pitched; W = Wins; L = Losses; ERA = Earned run average; SO = Strikeouts

Player	G	IP	W	L	ERA	SO
Jhoulys Chacín	31	194.0	11	14	3.62	150
Jason Hammel	32	170.1	7	13	4.76	94
Ubaldo Jiménez	21	123.0	6	9	4.46	118
Aaron Cook	18	97.0	3	10	6.03	48
Esmil Rogers	18	83.0	6	6	7.05	63
Juan Nicasio	13	71.2	4	4	4.14	58
Jorge De La Rosa	10	59.0	5	2	3.51	52
Kevin Millwood	9	54.1	4	3	3.98	36
Alex White	7	36.1	2	4	8.42	24
Drew Pomeranz	4	18.1	2	1	5.40	13
Alan Johnson	1	4.0	0	0	9.00	3

==== Other pitchers ====
Note: G = Games pitched; IP = Innings pitched; W = Wins; L = Losses; ERA = Earned run average; SO = Strikeouts

Player	G	IP	W	L	ERA	SO
Clayton Mortensen	16	58.1	2	4	3.86	30
Greg Reynolds	13	32.0	3	0	6.19	18

==== Relief pitchers ====
Note: G = Games pitched; W = Wins; L = Losses; SV = Saves; ERA = Earned run average; SO = Strikeouts

Player	G	W	L	SV	ERA	SO
Huston Street	62	1	4	29	3.86	55
Matt Belisle	74	10	4	0	3.25	58
Matt Reynolds	73	1	2	0	4.09	50
Rafael Betancourt	68	2	0	8	2.89	73
Matt Lindstrom	63	2	2	2	3.00	36
Rex Brothers	48	1	2	1	2.88	59
Josh Roenicke	19	0	0	0	3.78	12
Felipe Paulino	18	0	4	0	7.36	14
Edgmer Escalona	14	0	0	0	1.75	14
Franklin Morales	14	0	1	0	3.56	11
J.C. Romero	12	1	0	0	4.32	9
Matt Daley	7	0	0	0	10.50	7
Eric Stults	6	0	0	0	6.00	7
Jim Miller	6	0	0	0	2.57	5
Bruce Billings	1	0	0	0	4.50	0
Édgar González	1	0	0	0	9.00	1

== Notes ==
- On September 24, the Rockies and Houston Astros played the 200,000th game in MLB history. The Rockies won 4-2 in 13 innings.

== Farm system ==
Level	Team	League	Manager
AAA	Colorado Springs Sky Sox	Pacific Coast League	Stu Cole
AA	Tulsa Drillers	Texas League	Duane Espy
A	Modesto Nuts	California League	Jerry Weinstein
A	Asheville Tourists	South Atlantic League	Joe Mikulik
A-Short Season	Tri-City Dust Devils	Northwest League	Fred Ocasio
Rookie	Casper Ghosts	Pioneer League	Tony Diaz

Records
Preceded by 2010	Colorado Rockies seasons 2011	Succeeded by 2012
