= Jonathan Herrera =

Jonathan Herrera may refer to:

- Jonathan Herrera (baseball) (born 1984), Venezuelan baseball infielder
- Jonathan Herrera (footballer, born 1991), Argentine forward
- Jonathan Herrera (footballer, born 2001), Mexican forward
