= Jordan Pacheco =

American baseball player and coach (born 1986)

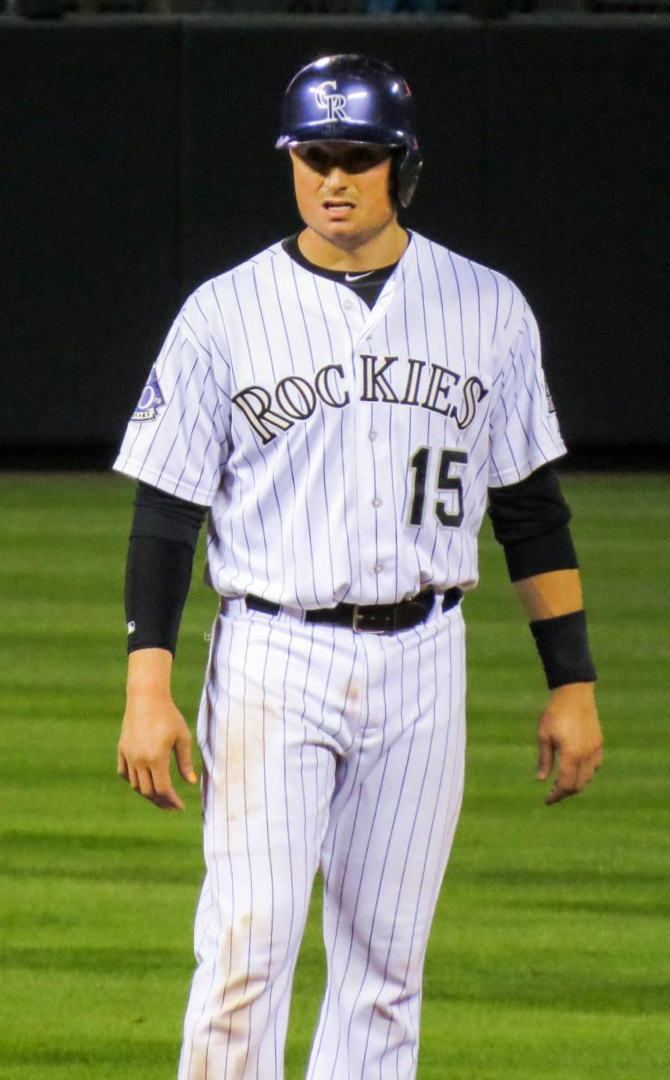
- Pacheco with the Colorado Rockies in 2013

Colorado Rockies – No. 74
- Infielder / Catcher / Coach
- Born: January 30, 1986 (age 40); Albuquerque, New Mexico, U.S.
- Batted: Right Threw: Right

MLB debut
- September 6, 2011, for the Colorado Rockies

Last MLB appearance
- May 31, 2016, for the Cincinnati Reds

MLB statistics
- Batting average: .272
- Home run: 10
- Runs batted in: 114
- Stats at Baseball Reference

Teams
- As player: Colorado Rockies (2011–2014); Arizona Diamondbacks (2014–2015); Cincinnati Reds (2016); As coach: Colorado Rockies (2025–present)

Jordan Patrick Pacheco (born January 30, 1986) is an American former professional baseball infielder and catcher who is a hitting coach for the Colorado Rockies in Major League Baseball (MLB). He played in Major League Baseball (MLB) for the Rockies, Arizona Diamondbacks and the Cincinnati Reds.

== Early career ==
Prior to playing professionally, Pacheco attended La Cueva High School and then the University of New Mexico, where he played from 2005 to 2007. In 2005, he hit .408 with 15 home runs and 52 RBI in 52 games, earning 3rd team All-America and first-team All-Mountain West Conference.

In 2005, he played with the Northwoods League La Crosse Loggers where he hit .287 with a team Leading 13 2B's. He played in 62 of the possible 64 games that summer.

In 2006, he hit .351 with 11 stolen bases in 59 games with the University of New Mexico, once again earning first-team All-Mountain West Conference. He also played for the Yarmouth-Dennis Red Sox of the Cape Cod League that year, hitting .190 in 42 games and posting a 1.35 ERA in four relief appearances.

In 2007, he hit .397 in 55 games, being named first-team All-West Conference for the third straight year and earning Mountain West Conference Player of the Year honors. He was drafted in the ninth round of the 2007 amateur draft and began his professional career that season.

== Professional career ==
=== Colorado Rockies ===
Pacheco split his first professional season between the Casper Rockies and Tri-City Dust Devils, hitting a combined .287 with 64 hits in 62 games. In 2008, he played for the Dust Devils and hit .280 in 54 games. He hit .323 with 13 home runs, 79 RBI and 12 stolen bases for the Asheville Tourists in 2009 and was named a South Atlantic League All-Star as well as the South Atlantic League Most Valuable Player.

In 2010, he played for the Modesto Nuts and Tulsa Drillers, hitting a combined .323 in 125 games, walking 60 times while striking out only 44 times. He was a California League All-Star that season.

In 2011, he made his Major League debut with the Colorado Rockies on September 6 against the Arizona Diamondbacks. He went 2 for 4 with 2 RBI, although he did commit a throwing error. He played in 21 games for the Rockies that September, hitting .286 with 2 HR and 14 RBI.

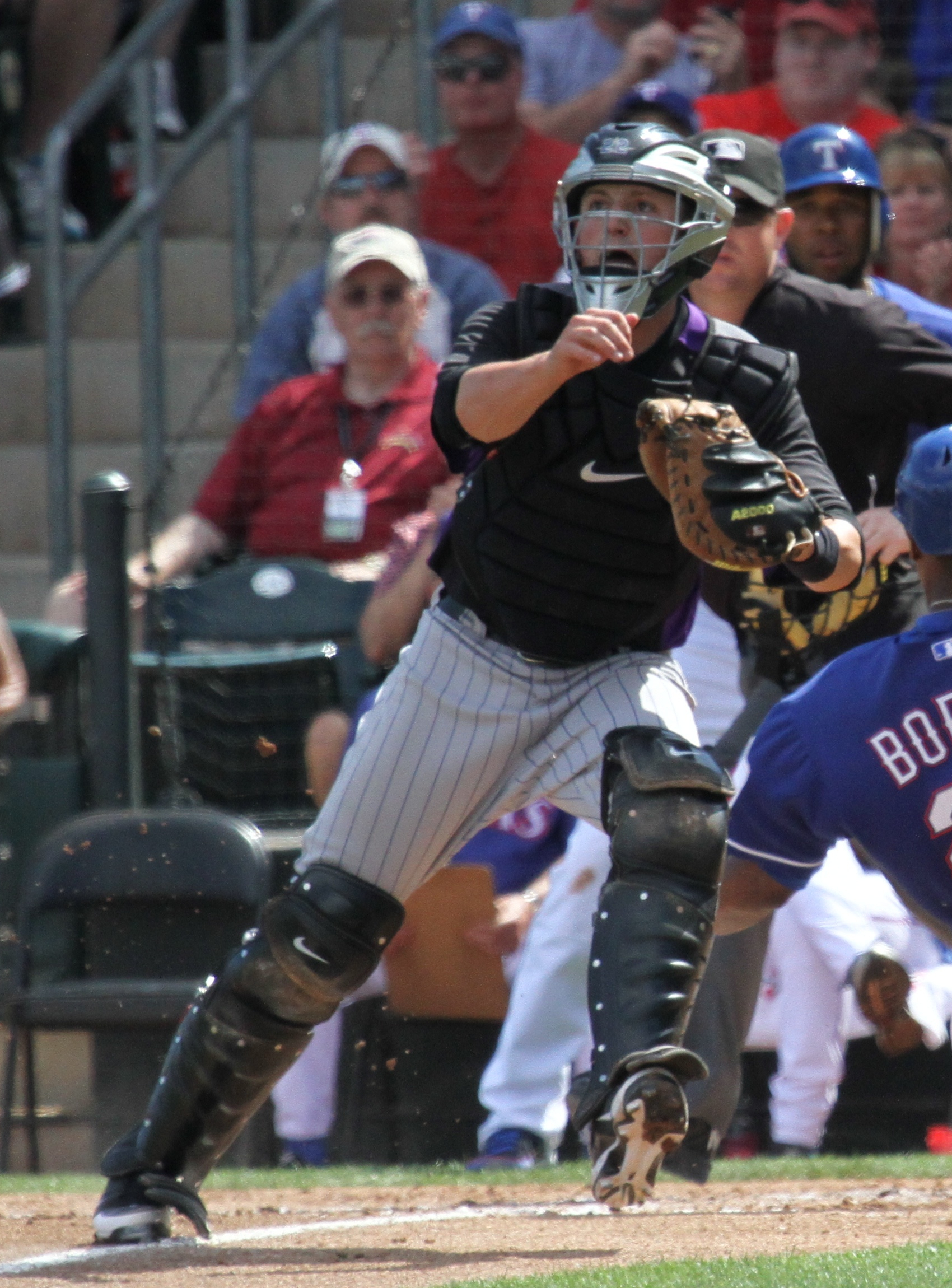
Pacheco playing catcher for the Colorado Rockies in 2012 spring training

Pacheco cracked the Opening Day roster in 2012 as a reserve player, but after appearing in 5 games, he was optioned to Triple-A Colorado Springs. He played in 17 games with the Sky Sox, recording a hit in all but 2, hitting .433 with 3 HR and 10 RBI before returning to the Rockies on May 5. He was named the starting third baseman on May 15, replacing Chris Nelson and Jonathan Herrera. He got extended time at first base and catcher during August and September, with Nelson retaking the hot corner. Overall in 2012, he hit a rookie-leading .309 with 5 HR and 54 RBI. He finished 6th in the National League Rookie of the Year Award voting.

Pacheco made the Opening Day roster in 2013 mostly playing first base along with the retiring Todd Helton. After a hot April in which he hit .339 with 6 RBI, he cooled off in May and June, receiving less playing time. On July 29, he was optioned to Colorado Springs and was replaced by Charlie Culberson. By the time of his option, he was hitting .229 with 1 HR and 17 RBI. After 18 games with the Sky Sox, he was hitting .315 with 1 HR and 6 RBI, and on August 19, he was recalled to replace back-up catcher Yorvit Torrealba, who went down with a concussion. When Torrealba returned, Pacheco stayed, and played through September with the Rockies. In 95 games with the Rockies in 2013, he hit .239 with 1 HR and 22 RBI.

In the offseason, Pacheco was converted back to a full-time catcher. He played winter ball with the Toros del Este, hitting .274 in 20 games. Pacheco made the Opening Day roster in 2014 as the backup catcher to Wilin Rosario. Pacheco was designated for assignment by the Rockies on June 4, 2014, and was replaced by Michael McKenry behind the plate.

In 270 games with Colorado over 4 seasons, Pacheco hit .281 with 8 HR and 98 RBI.

=== Arizona Diamondbacks ===
On June 12, 2014, Pacheco was claimed off waivers by the Arizona Diamondbacks. Pacheco hit .272/.298/.321 in 47 games for Arizona in 2014. On November 4, 2014, Pacheco was outrighted off of the 40-man roster and elected free agency.

On December 25, 2014, Pacheco re-signed with the Diamondbacks on a minor league contract that included an invitation to Spring Training.

Pacheco was selected to the Diamondbacks’ 40-man roster on April 5, 2015. After hitting .242 in 29 games, he was designated for assignment on June 6. He elected free agency on October 5, 2015.

=== Cincinnati Reds ===
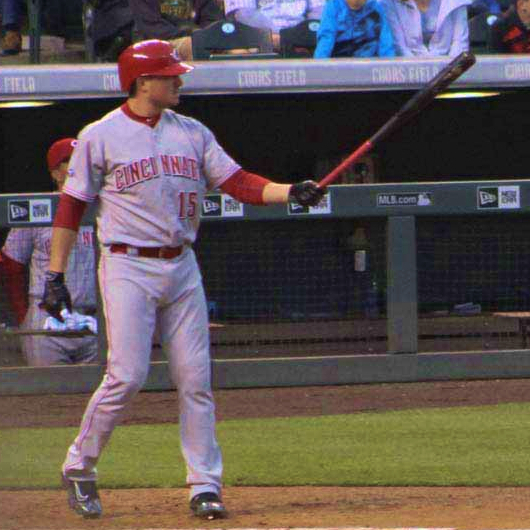
Pacheco with the Cincinnati Reds in 2016

On January 16, 2016, Pacheco signed a minor league deal with the Cincinnati Reds organization. On April 3, Pacheco was selected to the 40-man roster. On June 22, 2016, Pacheco was outrighted to Triple-A, but rejected the assignment and opted for free agency. He had hit only .157 in 31 games.

=== Atlanta Braves ===
On June 24, 2016, Pacheco signed a minor league contract with the Atlanta Braves organization. He played in two games for the Triple–A Gwinnett Braves, going 1–for–8 (.125). After being hit by a pitch, he suffered a broken wrist and then underwent season ending shoulder surgery for a torn labrum. Pacheco elected free agency following the season on November 7.

=== Long Island Ducks ===
On May 26, 2017, Pacheco signed with the Long Island Ducks of the Atlantic League of Professional Baseball. In 42 games for the Ducks, Pacheco slashed .273/.351/.420 with 3 home runs and 22 RBI. He became a free agent after the season.

=== Minnesota Twins ===
On January 8, 2018, Pacheco signed a minor league deal with the Minnesota Twins organization. After spending the season in Triple-A with the Rochester Red Wings, Pacheco elected free agency on November 2, 2018.

=== Acereros de Monclova ===
On February 1, 2019, Pacheco signed with the Acereros de Monclova of the Mexican League. He elected free agency on June 20, 2019. In 33 games he hit .278/.368/.456 with 2 home runs and 11 RBIs.

=== Seattle Mariners ===
On June 21, 2019, Pacheco signed a minor league deal with the Seattle Mariners. He spent the remainder of the season in Triple-A with the Tacoma Rainiers before electing free agency on November 4, 2019.

=== Lexington Legends ===
On May 13, 2021, Pacheco signed with the Lexington Legends of the Atlantic League of Professional Baseball. In 39 games, he hit .370 with four home runs and 29 RBI.

On August 3, 2021, Pacheco announced via Instagram that he was retiring from professional baseball.

== Coaching career ==
On November 19, 2021, Pacheco was named the hitting coach for the Triple-A Albuquerque Isotopes of the Colorado Rockies organization.

In May 2025, Pacheco was named as a hitting coach for the Colorado Rockies following the firing of multiple coaches.
