= Alan Johnson (baseball) =

American baseball player (born 1983)

- Starting pitcher
- Born: August 24, 1983 (age 42); Birmingham, Alabama
- Batted: Right Threw: Right

MLB debut
- April 17, 2011, for the Colorado Rockies

Last MLB appearance
- April 17, 2011, for the Colorado Rockies

MLB statistics (through 2011 season)
- Win–loss record: 0-0
- Earned run average: 9.00
- Strikeouts: 3
- Stats at Baseball Reference

Teams
- Colorado Rockies (2011)

Thomas Alan Johnson (born August 24, 1983) is a former starting pitcher in Major League Baseball who played briefly for the Colorado Rockies in the 2011 season.

Johnson belongs to a group of ballplayers who at least secured a cup of coffee in the majors.

Born in Birmingham, Alabama, Johnson was signed as an undrafted agent by Colorado in 2005 out of Mississippi State University. He was immediately assigned to the rookie level Grand Junction Rockies, where he went 3–2 with a 3.97 earned run average and 78 strikeouts in 79 1/3 innings.

Johnson gained a promotion to Single-A Asheville Tourists for 2006, and had a 13–5 record with a 4.04 ERA while striking out 123 in 160 1/3 innings. He then opened 2007 with High-A Modesto Nuts, where he went 14–7 with a 2.99 ERA and 119 strikeouts in 168 2/3 innings. Late in the year, he finished 2–0 with a 0.00 ERA in two starts for Double-A Tulsa Drillers.

But Johnson declined in 2008 with Tulsa, where he went 4–14 with a 5.23 ERA in 28 starts, striking out 92 in 175 2/3 innings. Even though, he was promoted to Triple-A Colorado Springs Sky Sox in 2009, where he went 10–6 with a 5.66 ERA in 26 games (24 starts), and strike out 76 in 143 innings.

Johnson came back with the Sky Sox in 2010, finishing 10–8 with a 5.91 ERA in 28 games (25 starts), and striking out 100 in 141 2/3 innings. He then made one start for the Sky Sox in 2011 before being promoted to the Rockies to replace Greg Reynolds.

Johnson made his major league pitching debut on April 17, 2011. He was slated to start a game against the Chicago Cubs, and he allowed five runs (four earned) on six hits and three walks in four innings, leaving the game with the score tied, 5–5. The Rockies went on to win the game, 9–5, with Johnson not factoring in the decision. He then was designated for assignment on April 29, and was outrighted off the roster on May 3.

Johnson returned to the Sky Sox and finished the year there in undistinguished fashion. He made 26 appearances (23 starts) and finished 5–11 with a 7.43 ERA and 85 strikeouts in 132 innings of work. As a result, he was released and became a minor league free agent.

In April 2012, Johnson signed with the Lancaster Barnstormers of the Atlantic League. In 27 games (26 starts) with the Barnstormers, he went 14–6 with a 4.57 ERA, striking out 79 in 138 innings. On March 11, 2013, Johnson re-signed with Lancaster.

His most recent appearance was in 2013, when he posted a 1–3 record with an 8.02 ERA in 10 games for Lancaster, including seven starts, striking out 20 while walking 21 in 33 2/3 innings of work.

In between, Johnson played winter ball with the Tiburones de La Guaira club of the Venezuelan League in the 2009 season.
