= Héctor Gómez =

Dominican baseball player (born 1988)

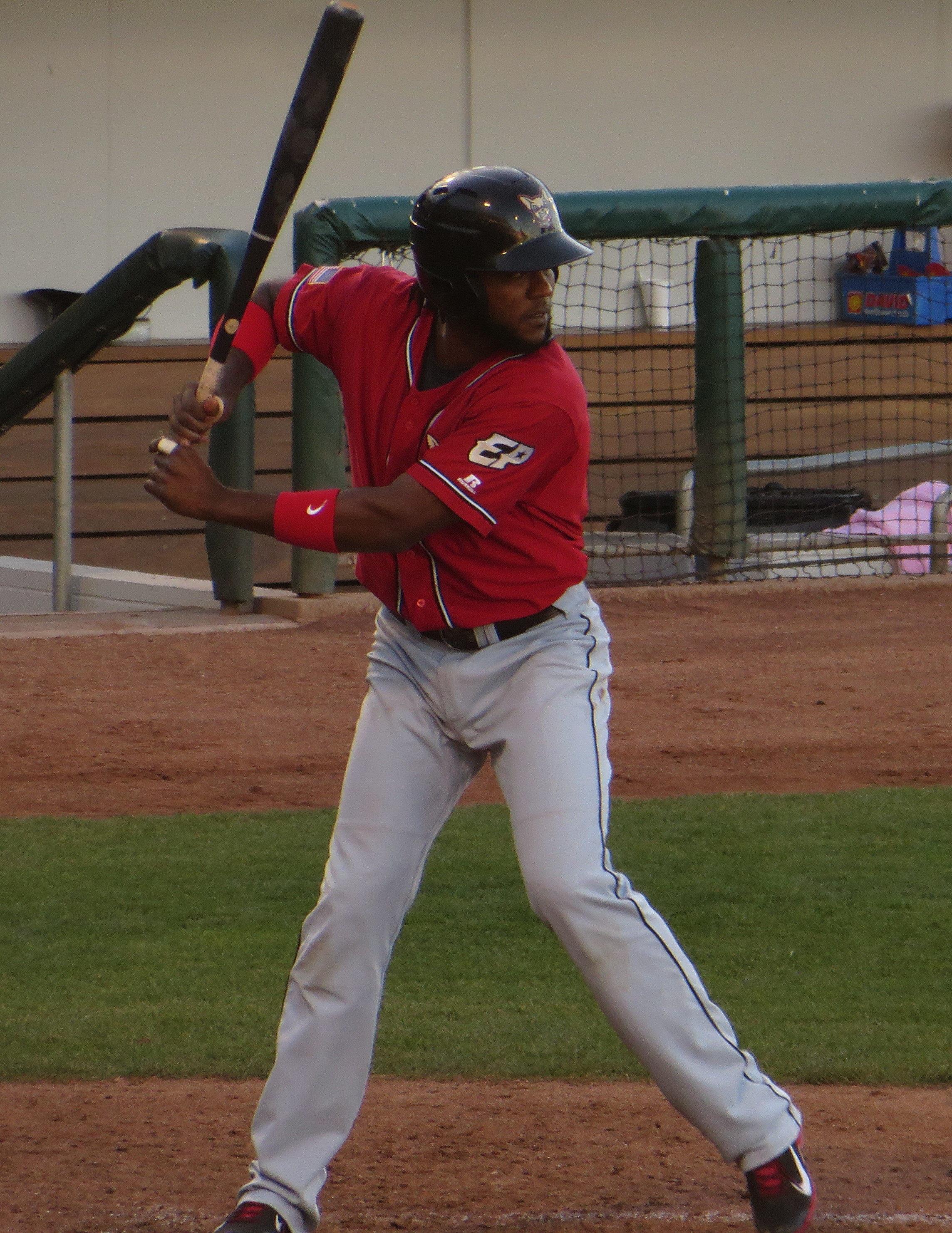
- Gómez with the El Paso Chihuahuas in 2015
- Infielder
- Born: March 5, 1988 (age 38); San Pedro de Macorís, Dominican Republic
- Batted: Right Threw: Right

Professional debut
- MLB: September 16, 2011, for the Colorado Rockies
- KBO: April 1, 2016, for the SK Wyverns

Last appearance
- MLB: August 5, 2015, for the Milwaukee Brewers
- KBO: October 1, 2016, for the SK Wyverns

MLB statistics
- Batting average: .183
- Home runs: 1
- Runs batted in: 8

KBO statistics
- Batting average: .283
- Home runs: 21
- Runs batted in: 62
- Stats at Baseball Reference

Teams
- Colorado Rockies (2011); Milwaukee Brewers (2014–2015); SK Wyverns (2016)

Héctor Alexis Gómez (born March 5, 1988) is a Dominican former professional baseball infielder. He played in Major League Baseball (MLB) for the Colorado Rockies and Milwaukee Brewers, and in the KBO League for the SK Wyverns.

== Career ==
=== Colorado Rockies ===
Gómez began his professional career in 2006 after being signed by scout Felix Feliz. He split the season between the Casper Rockies (50 games) and Tri-City Dust Devils (two games), hitting a combined .312 in 62 games. In 2007, he played for the Asheville Tourists, hitting .266 with 11 home runs and 20 stolen bases in 124 games. He played in only one game in 2008, for the Modesto Nuts, collecting one hit in three at-bats. With the Nuts in 2009, Gómez hit .275 in 83 games.

He began the 2011 season with the Tulsa Drillers. Gómez was called up to the majors on September 16, 2011, and made his debut that night.

=== Milwaukee Brewers ===
On June 28, 2012, he was claimed off of waivers by the Milwaukee Brewers, and was assigned to the Brevard County Manatees. Gómez spent the entire 2013 season with the Double-A Huntsville Stars. After playing the entire 2014 minor league season with the Triple-A Nashville Sounds, he was called up to the Brewers on September 2.

On May 4, 2015, Gómez hit his first career home run off of Los Angeles Dodgers starting pitcher Clayton Kershaw.

On August 7, 2015, Gómez was outrighted off of the 40-man roster after batting .181/.212/.323 in 134 plate appearances on the year. He elected free agency the next day.

=== San Diego Padres ===
On August 10, 2015, Gómez signed a minor league contract with the San Diego Padres organization and was assigned to the Triple-A El Paso Chihuahuas. On November 6, 2015, Gómez elected free agency.

=== SK Wyverns ===
On November 16, 2015, Gómez signed with the SK Wyverns of the KBO League. He batted .283/.324/.489 with 21 home runs and 62 RBI in 2016.

=== Philadelphia Phillies ===
On December 12, 2016, Gómez signed a minor league deal with the Philadelphia Phillies organization. He spent the year with the Triple–A Lehigh Valley IronPigs, hitting .236/.260/.425 with 7 home runs and 27 RBI. Gómez elected free agency following the season on November 6, 2017.

=== Guerreros de Oaxaca ===
On December 20, 2017, Gómez signed with the Guerreros de Oaxaca of the Mexican League. In 38 games for Oaxaca, he slashed .303/.327/.429 with four home runs, 20 RBI, and five stolen bases. Gómez was released by the Guerreros on May 2, 2018.

=== High Point Rockers ===
On April 11, 2019, Gómez signed with the High Point Rockers of the Atlantic League of Professional Baseball. In 121 games for the Rockers, he batted .291/.329/.453 with 12 home runs, 76 RBI, and 20 stolen bases. Gómez did not play in a game in 2020 due to the cancellation of the ALPB season because of the COVID-19 pandemic. He became a free agent following the season.

=== El Águila de Veracruz ===
On February 16, 2021, Gómez signed with El Águila de Veracruz of the Mexican League. In 63 games for Veracruz, he slashed .296/.340/.508 with 12 home runs and 43 RBI. Gómez was released by the team on January 19, 2022.

=== Generales de Durango ===
On February 4, 2022, Gómez signed with the Generales de Durango of the Mexican League. He played in only three games for Durango, going 5–for–14 (.357) with two RBI. Gómez was released by Durango on November 30.

=== Long Island Ducks ===
On April 15, 2024, Gómez signed with the Long Island Ducks of the Atlantic League of Professional Baseball. In 30 games for the Ducks, he slashed .220/.237/.312 with two home runs, 20 RBI, and one stolen base. Gómez became a free agent following the season.
