= George Tani Field =

Baseball stadium in Wyoming

Coordinates: 42°51′43″N 106°18′19″W

- Interactive map of George Tani Field
- Location: Casper, Wyoming
- Capacity: 4,462
- Surface: Natural Grass
- Field size: Left Field: 313 feet (95 m); Center Field: 410 feet (125 m); Right Field: 314 feet (96 m)

Construction
- Opened: 1964

Tenant
- Casper Ghosts Baseball

George Tani Field is a baseball stadium in Casper, Wyoming. It was the home field of the Casper Ghosts of the Pioneer Baseball League until the Mike Lansing Field opened in 2002. The stadium holds 4,462 spectators and opened in 1964.
