= Tommy Field =

American baseball player (born 1987)

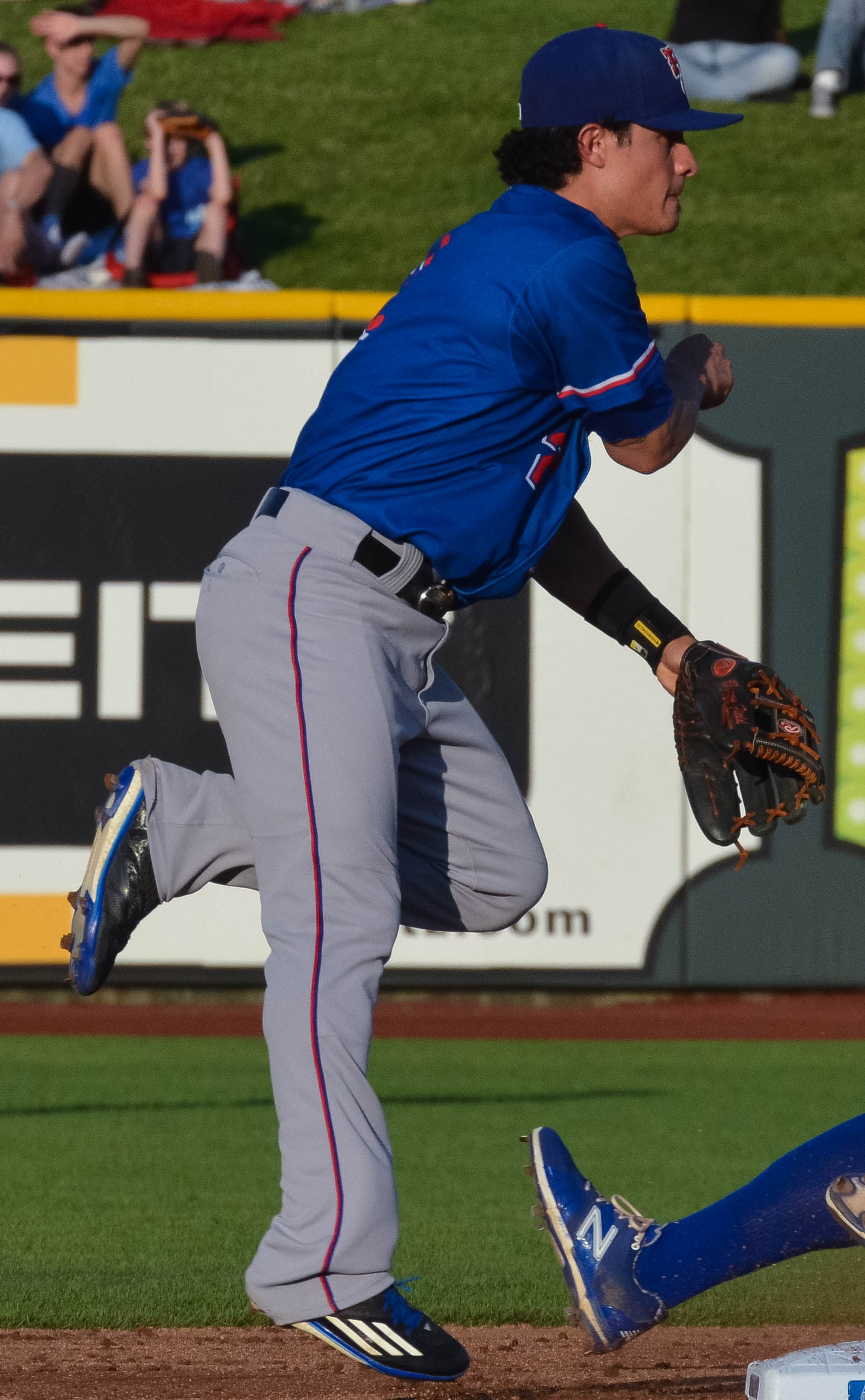
- Field playing for the Round Rock Express, triple-A affiliates of the Rangers, in 2015
- Infielder
- Born: February 22, 1987 (age 39); Austin, Texas, U.S.
- Batted: Right Threw: Right

MLB debut
- September 11, 2011, for the Colorado Rockies

Last MLB appearance
- May 27, 2015, for the Texas Rangers

MLB statistics
- Batting average: .214
- Home runs: 2
- Runs batted in: 8
- Stats at Baseball Reference

Teams
- Colorado Rockies (2011–2012); Los Angeles Angels of Anaheim (2013); Texas Rangers (2015)

Thomas Samuel Field (born February 22, 1987) is an American former professional baseball infielder. He played in Major League Baseball (MLB) for the Colorado Rockies, Los Angeles Angels of Anaheim, and Texas Rangers.

== Professional career ==
=== Colorado Rockies ===
Field was drafted by the Colorado Rockies in the 24th round of the 2008 Major League Baseball draft out of Texas State University. Field was assigned to the Low-A Tri-City Dust Devils, where in 56 games, Field hit .247 with five home runs, 32 RBI and 10 stolen bases.

Field played all of 2009 with the Single-A Asheville Tourists, where in 89 games, Field hit .257 with two home runs, 32 RBI and eight stolen bases. Field played all of 2010 with the High-A Modesto Nuts, where in 124 games, he hit .284 with 15 home runs, 72 RBI and 16 stolen bases. After the season, Field played with the Scottsdale Scorpions of the Arizona Fall League, where he hit .209 in 18 games.

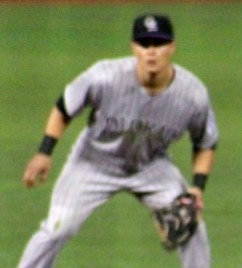
Field with Rockies in 2011.

Field began the 2011 season with the Double-A Tulsa Drillers, where in 134 games he hit .271 with 17 home runs, 61 RBI, and nine stolen bases. On September 11, 2011, Field was promoted to the major leagues for the first time. He made his debut that day, and recorded his first hit in his third game (second start), a single off of Shaun Marcum of the Milwaukee Brewers. In 16 games with the Rockies that year, Field hit .271 with three RBI.

Field began 2012 with the Triple-A Colorado Springs Sky Sox. On July 28, 2012, Field was recalled when Marco Scutaro was traded to the San Francisco Giants, but was optioned back to Colorado Springs the next day when Jonathan Herrera was activated from the disabled list. He went 0-for-2 with a walk in his two-game stint. In 121 games with Colorado Springs, Field hit .246 with eight home runs, 49 RBI, and four stolen bases.

In two seasons with the Rockies, Field hit .260/.315/.260 in 18 games with three RBI.

=== Los Angeles Angels ===
On November 2, 2012, Field was claimed off waivers by the Minnesota Twins. On November 28, Field was claimed off of waivers by the Los Angeles Angels of Anaheim.

Field began 2013 with the Triple-A Salt Lake Bees. On April 20, 2013, Field was recalled when Mark Lowe was placed on the disabled list, but was optioned back to Salt Lake 3 days later when Nick Maronde was recalled. On July 20, Field was recalled to replace Brendan Harris, who was designated for assignment. He made 15 appearances for Los Angeles, going 4-for-26 (.154) with a walk.

Field began the 2014 campaign with Triple-A Salt Lake, hitting .285 with seven home runs, 33 RBI, and five stolen bases across 80 appearances. Field was designated for assignment by the Angels on August 7, 2014.

=== Pittsburgh Pirates ===
On August 10, 2014, Field was claimed off of waivers by the Pittsburgh Pirates. He was designated for assignment by Pittsburgh on August 24. Field cleared waivers and was sent outright to the Triple-A Indianapolis Indians on August 29. In 10 games for Indianapolis, he hit .297/.400/.324 with nine RBI.

=== Texas Rangers ===
Field was signed to a minor league contract by the Texas Rangers on December 16, 2014. He made his Rangers debut on May 11, 2015 against the Kansas City Royals and hit his first career home run in the same game. Field hit another homer on May 16, against the Cleveland Indians. He was designated for assignment by the Rangers on May 30.

During the 2015 season, Field played for the Rangers and their Triple-A affiliate, the Round Rock Express. In 14 games with the Rangers, Fields hit .195 with six runs, one double, two home runs and five RBI. In 103 games with Round Rock, Field hit .247 with 51 runs, 23 doubles, three triples, 14 home runs, and 44 RBI.

=== Detroit Tigers ===
On December 11, 2015, Field signed a minor-league contract with the Detroit Tigers, and was invited to spring training. He was released by the Tigers on May 6, 2016.

=== Minnesota Twins (second stint) ===
On May 14, 2016, Field signed a minor league contract with the Minnesota Twins organization. He made 82 appearances for the Triple–A Rochester Red Wings, hitting .235/.313/.413 with 11 home runs and 42 RBI. Field elected free agency following the season on November 7.

On December 24, 2016, Field re–signed with the Twins on a new minor league contract. In 115 games for Triple–A Rochester, he batted .231/.296/.348 with six home runs and 32 RBI. Field elected free agency following the season on November 6, 2017.

On January 19, 2018, Field chose to retire from professional baseball rather than seek employment with another organization.
