= Cole Garner =

American baseball player (born 1984)

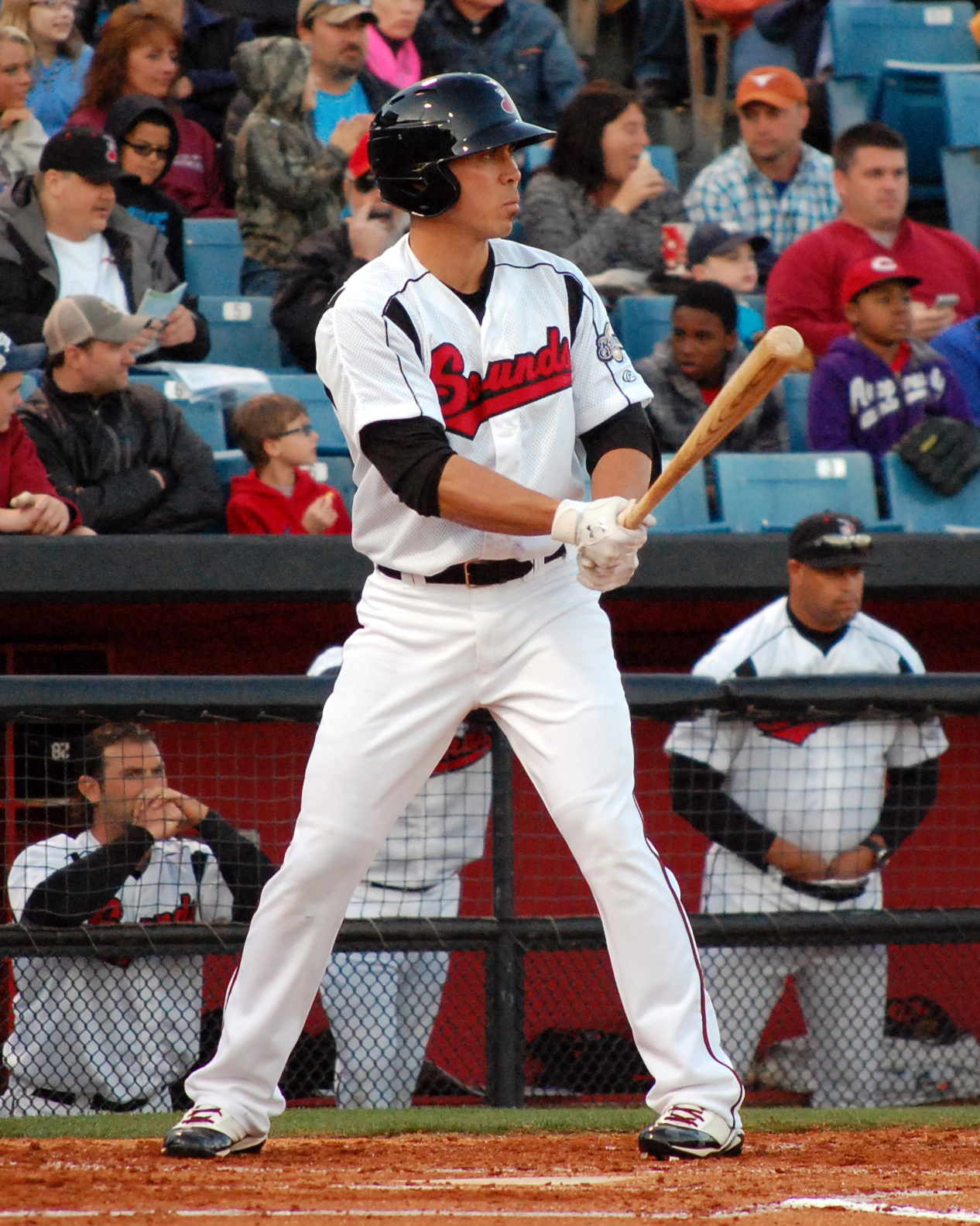
- Garner playing for the Nashville Sounds in 2013
- Outfielder
- Born: December 15, 1984 (age 41); Long Beach, California, U.S.
- Batted: Right Threw: Right

MLB debut
- July 4, 2011, for the Colorado Rockies

Last appearance
- July 14, 2011, for the Colorado Rockies

MLB statistics
- Batting average: .222
- Home runs: 0
- Runs batted in: 3
- Stats at Baseball Reference

Teams
- Colorado Rockies (2011)

Robert Cole Garner (born December 15, 1984) is an American former professional baseball outfielder. He played in Major League Baseball (MLB) for the Colorado Rockies in 2011.

== Career ==
=== Colorado Rockies ===
Garner was selected by the Colorado Rockies in the 26th round (767th overall) of the 2003 Major League Baseball draft. He made his professional debut in 2005 after injuries prevented him from doing so in 2003 or 2004. In 66 games with the rookie-level Casper Rockies he hit .260 with 10 HR and 48 RBI. Garner had an outstanding 2006 with the Single-A Asheville Tourists, where in 120 games, he hit .302 with 19 home runs, 88 RBI and 35 stolen bases. Garner played 2007 as a switch-hitter with the High-A Modesto Nuts, where in 96 games, he hit .213 with 8 home runs and 33 RBI. In 2007, Garner was considered to be one of the top outfielder prospects in the Rockies organization.

Garner returned to hitting exclusively right-handed for 2008. His season ended in late July due to another injury. In 50 games, he hit .318 with two home runs and 17 RBI. Garner played 2009 with the Double-A Tulsa Drillers, where in 112 games, he hit .288 with 16 home runs, 64 RBI and 13 stolen bases. Garner played 2010 with the Triple-A Colorado Springs Sky Sox, where in 111 games, he hit .304 with 13 home runs and 61 RBI. Following the 2010 season, he was added to the Rockies' 40-man roster, in order to be protected from the Rule 5 draft.

Garner spent most of the 2011 season with Colorado Springs, but had 2 stints with the Rockies. Garner made his MLB debut on July 4, 2011, making him the 20,000 player in the MLB, pinch hitting in the 8th inning against the Atlanta Braves' Jonny Venters and flying out to right field. The following day he was optioned back to Colorado Springs to make room for Ian Stewart, his teammate at La Quinta High School, to be recalled. He got his first hit in his second stint, a go-ahead RBI single off of Ryan Mattheus of the Washington Nationals. On December 12, Garner was non-tendered by Colorado and became a free agent.

=== New York Yankees ===
Garner signed a minor league contract with the New York Yankees on January 4, 2012, receiving an invitation to spring training. Garner spent the year with the Triple-A Empire State Yankees, where in 64 games, he hit .258 with six home runs and 25 RBI.

=== Milwaukee Brewers ===
On January 4, 2013, Garner signed a minor league contract with the Milwaukee Brewers, and was invited to their minor league mini-camp. Before the season, Garner was assigned to the Triple-A Nashville Sounds, but was released by the Brewers on July 26. In 71 games with the Sounds, he hit .192 with eight home runs and 29 RBI.

=== Southern Maryland Blue Crabs ===
In August 2013, Garner signed with the Southern Maryland Blue Crabs of the Atlantic League of Professional Baseball. In 20 games for the team, Garner batted .147/.206/.250 with two home runs, six RBI, and one stolen base.

=== Lancaster Barnstormers ===
On February 10, 2014, Garner signed with the Lancaster Barnstormers of the Atlantic League of Professional Baseball. In 132 appearances for Lancaster, Garner slashed .313/.359/.551 with 26 home runs, 92 RBI, and 18 stolen bases.

=== Broncos de Reynosa ===
On March 13, 2015, Garner signed with the Broncos de Reynosa of the Mexican League. In 40 appearances for Reynosa, Garner slashed .342/.392/.584 with eight home runs, 26 RBI, and three stolen bases.

=== Toronto Blue Jays ===
Garner signed a minor league contract with the Toronto Blue Jays on May 26, 2015. In 8 games for the Double-A New Hampshire Fisher Cats, he went 6-for-27 (.222). Garner elected free agency following the season on November 6.

=== New Britain Bees ===
On July 28, 2016, Garner signed with the New Britain Bees of the Atlantic League of Professional Baseball. In 32 games for the Bees, he hit .240/.292/.463 with seven home runs and 23 RBI. Garner became a free agent after the season.

=== Niigata Albirex ===
On March 24, 2017, Garner signed with the Niigata Albirex Baseball Club of Baseball Challenge League. On July 7, he left the team.

=== Lancaster Barnstormers (second stint) ===
On July 14, 2017, Garner was assigned to the Lancaster Barnstormers. In 58 games down the stretch, he batted .320/.378/.543 with eight home runs, 46 RBI, and four stolen bases.

== Personal ==
His grandparents are from Kyushu, Japan.
