= Bruce Billings (baseball) =

American baseball player & coach (born 1985)

- Pitcher
- Born: November 18, 1985 (age 40); San Diego, California, U.S.
- Batted: Right Threw: Right

Professional debut
- MLB: May 27, 2011, for the Colorado Rockies
- CPBL: March 27, 2016, for the Uni-President 7-Eleven Lions

Last appearance
- MLB: April 25, 2014, for the New York Yankees
- CPBL: August 24, 2018, for the Fubon Guardians

MLB statistics
- Win–loss record: 0–0
- Earned run average: 9.82
- Strikeouts: 14

CPBL statistics
- Win–loss record: 26–28
- Earned run average: 5.00
- Strikeouts: 410
- Stats at Baseball Reference

Teams
- Colorado Rockies (2011); Oakland Athletics (2011); New York Yankees (2014); Uni-President 7-Eleven Lions (2016–2017); Fubon Guardians (2018)

Bruce Billings (born November 18, 1985) is an American former professional baseball pitcher. He played in Major League Baseball (MLB) for the Colorado Rockies, Oakland Athletics, and New York Yankees. He also played in the Chinese Professional Baseball League (CPBL) for the Uni-President 7-Eleven Lions and Fubon Guardians.

== Early life and college ==
Billings is the son of Bruce and Emily. Billings attended the San Diego School of Creative and Performing Arts (SDSCPA) and Samuel F. B. Morse High School and San Diego State University who played for the SDSU baseball team as a short reliever in 2004 and a starter in 2005 and 2006. In 2005, he played collegiate summer baseball with the Wareham Gatemen of the Cape Cod Baseball League. While at SDSU, Bruce Billings became the school's all-time strikeout leader (Stephen Strasberg went on the break Billings record before leaving for professional baseball). Billings was drafted by the Philadelphia Phillies in the 2006 Major League Baseball draft in the 31st round, but decided to stay one more year at San Diego State.

== Playing career ==
=== Colorado Rockies ===
==== Minor leagues ====
Billings was again drafted by the Colorado Rockies in the 30th round in the 2007 Major League Baseball draft, 912th overall, and he accepted the deal.

Billings started his minor league career with the Tri-City Dust Devils where he went 4–2 in 15 starts. In 2008 with the Asheville Tourists, Billings threw a no-hitter against the Lakewood BlueClaws. Billings started to convert to a reliever in 2010 with the Tulsa Drillers with more than half of his appearances being in relief. Billings was also a mid-season All Star with Tulsa. Billings did not pitch one start in 2011 with the Colorado Springs Sky Sox before being promoted.

While in Double-A Tulsa, Billings set the team record for most consecutive scoreless innings at 38. ()

==== Major leagues ====
On May 25, 2011, Billings was recalled to the majors when Jorge de la Rosa being placed on the 15-day disabled list with a tear of the ulnar collateral ligament in his left elbow. On May 27, Billings made his major league debut in relief of Matt Daley. Billings pitched the 8th and the 9th innings in a 10–3 loss to the St. Louis Cardinals, giving up 5 hits and 1 run, while recording no strikeouts.

=== Oakland Athletics ===
Billings and a player to be named later were traded to the Oakland Athletics in exchange for Mark Ellis on June 30, 2011. He pitched five innings in three games for the Athletics, allowing seven runs (all of which scored in one outing against the New York Yankees in a rain delayed game). He spent the next two seasons with the Sacramento River Cats in Triple-A. While in Triple-A with Sacramento, Billings was voted Most Valuable Pitcher in 2012, and was runner up in 2013 before electing free agency in 2014.

=== New York Yankees ===
On December 24, 2013, Billings signed a minor league contract with the New York Yankees organization. He appeared for the Triple-A Scranton/Wilkes-Barre RailRiders and one for the Yankees, where he allowed four runs in four innings, while also recording 7 strikeouts. After the game, Billings found a muscle hernia in his forearm (he was placed on the disabled list afterward). He was designated for assignment by New York on July 22, 2014. Billings was released by the Yankees on August 2.

=== Los Angeles Dodgers ===
On August 7, 2014, he signed a minor league contract with the Los Angeles Dodgers and reported to the Triple-A Albuquerque Isotopes. He appeared in five games for the Isotopes, all as a relief pitcher and was 1–1 with a 6.75 ERA. Billings became a free agent at the end of the 2014 season.

=== Washington Nationals ===
On November 21, 2014, the Washington Nationals signed Billings to a minor league deal with an invitation to spring training. With the Triple-A Syracuse Chiefs, he went 8-5 while posting a 3.63 ERA; recorded 90 strikeouts in 121 1/3 innings with a WHIP of 1.26. He elected free agency on November 6, 2015.

=== Uni-President 7-Eleven Lions ===
In February 2016, Billings signed with the Uni-President 7-Eleven Lions of the Chinese Professional Baseball League. He joined the spring training in mid-February with a former MLB players, Felix Pie, and Jair Jurrjens. Billings became the ace of staff over the course of the season, leading the team in wins (11), strikeouts, innings, complete games, and WHIP. Here is an article where Billings is interviewed about the league dynamics for pitchers. He re-signed with the team for the 2017 season, again leading the team in wins, strikeouts, innings, and WHIP. Billings became a free agent following the season because the team did not want to guarantee him a contract through the season.

=== Fubon Guardians ===
On March 4, 2018, Billings signed with the Fubon Guardians of the Chinese Professional Baseball League. Billings recorded a 2–9 record and 5.72 ERA in 20 appearances with Fubon.

== Coaching career ==
=== Philadelphia Phillies ===
On December 28, 2018, Billings announced his retirement in order to pursue a coaching opportunity in the Philadelphia Phillies organization.

=== Fubon Guardians ===
On December 14, 2020, Billings accepted a coaching job with the Fubon Guardians of the Chinese Professional Baseball League (CPBL). On November 17, 2021, it was announced that Billings had reportedly resigned from his position due to an altercation he had had with Fubon manager Hong I-chung.

=== Chicago Cubs ===
In 2023, Billings was named pitching coach of the Myrtle Beach Pelicans, the Single-A affiliate for the Chicago Cubs. In 2024, Billings was named as the pitching coach of the South Bend Cubs, Chicago's High-A affiliate.

On February 18, 2025, Billings was hired to serve as the pitching coach for Single-A Myrtle Beach.
