= Chris Nelson (baseball) =

American baseball player (born 1985)

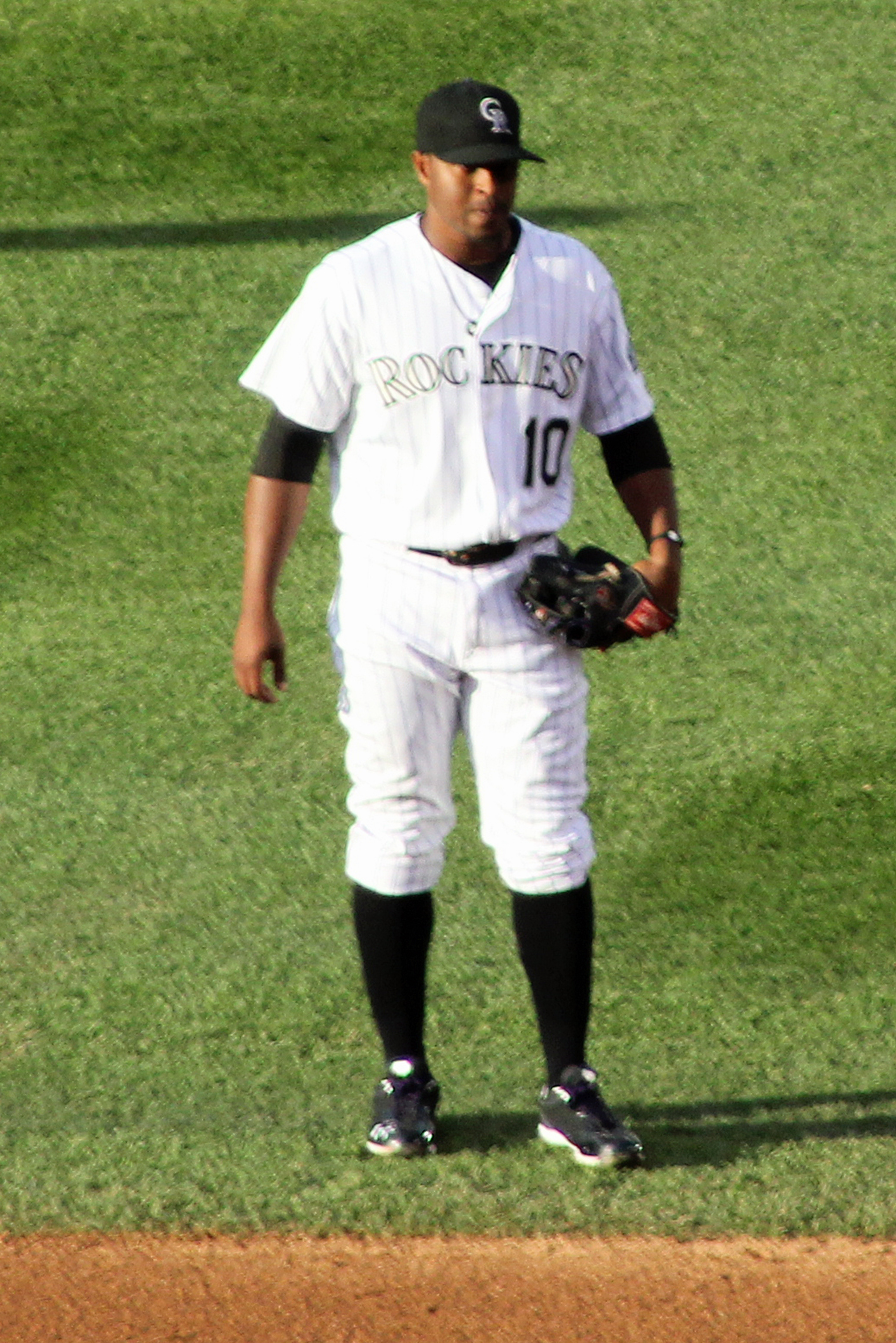
- Nelson with the Colorado Rockies
- Infielder
- Born: September 3, 1985 (age 41); Escondido, California, U.S.
- Batted: Right Threw: Right

MLB debut
- June 19, 2010, for the Colorado Rockies

Last MLB appearance
- August 29, 2014, for the San Diego Padres

MLB statistics
- Batting average: .265
- Home runs: 16
- Runs batted in: 100
- Stats at Baseball Reference

Teams
- Colorado Rockies (2010–2013); New York Yankees (2013); Los Angeles Angels of Anaheim (2013); San Diego Padres (2014)

Christopher Lars Nelson (born September 3, 1985) is an American former professional baseball infielder. He played in Major League Baseball (MLB) for the Colorado Rockies from 2010 through 2013, New York Yankees in 2013, the Los Angeles Angels of Anaheim in 2013, and the San Diego Padres in 2014.

== High school ==
Nelson played baseball at Redan High School in Stone Mountain, Georgia. He was one of the nation's top pitching prospects before undergoing Tommy John surgery following his junior season. As a senior, he batted .552. Nelson committed to play college baseball at Georgia.

== Professional career ==
=== Colorado Rockies ===
The Colorado Rockies selected Nelson in the first round, with the ninth overall selection, of the 2004 Major League Baseball draft, and received the third largest signing bonus in Rockies history. In July 2007, while playing for the Modesto Nuts, Nelson was named Rockies Farm Player of the Month.

Nelson was called up on June 18, 2010, to replace Troy Tulowitzki, who had broken his wrist. He was expected to play second base, with Clint Barmes moving to shortstop. On September 9, Nelson stole home plate against Cincinnati Reds pitcher Nick Masset, scoring what would be the deciding run in the Rockies' victory, their seventh straight. It was Nelson's first career stolen base, and the first time he had stolen home plate at any level. He played in 17 games for Colorado during his rookie campaign, hitting .280/.308/.320 with one stolen base.

Nelson played in 63 games for the Rockies in 2011, slashing .250/.280/.383 with four home runs, 16 RBI, and three stolen bases. Nelson was announced as the third base starter along with Jordan Pacheco during spring training in 2012. He made 111 appearances for Colorado during the year, batting .301/.352/.458 with nine home runs and 53 RBI.

In 2013, Nelson played in 21 games for the Rockies, hitting .242/.282/.318 with four RBI and four walks. Nelson was designated for assignment by Colorado on April 28, 2013, following the promotion of Nolan Arenado.

=== New York Yankees ===
On May 1, 2013, Nelson was traded to the New York Yankees. In 10 appearances for the Yankees, he went 8-for-36 (.222) with two RBI and one walks. On May 15, Nelson was designated for assignment to make room on the roster for David Adams.

=== Los Angeles Angels of Anaheim ===
On May 18, 2013, Nelson was claimed off waivers by the Los Angeles Angels of Anaheim. He was designated for assignment on June 10, and accepted an assignment to the Triple-A Salt Lake Bees on June 13. Following the trade of Alberto Callaspo on July 31, Nelson's contract was selected from Salt Lake. On August 15, he hit his first career grand slam against New York Yankees reliever Boone Logan. Nelson made 33 appearances for Los Angeles, slashing .220/.277/.349 with three home runs, 18 RBI, and two stolen bases. On December 2, Nelson was non-tendered by the Angels, making him a free agent.

=== Cincinnati Reds ===
On January 28, 2014, Nelson signed a minor league contract with the Cincinnati Reds. In 63 appearances for the Triple-A Louisville Bats, batting .274/.330/.363 with four home runs and 38 RBI. On June 16, Nelson was released by the Reds organization.

=== San Diego Padres ===
On June 19, 2014, Nelson signed a minor league contract with the San Diego Padres organization. On July 18, Nelson was recalled from the Triple-A El Paso Chihuahuas, and made his Padres debut against the New York Mets, going 2-for-4 with two RBI. Nelson was designated for assignment on September 2. Nelson elected free agency on October 6.

=== Philadelphia Phillies ===
Nelson signed a minor league contract with the Philadelphia Phillies on November 25, 2014. He made 16 appearances for the Triple-A Lehigh Valley IronPigs in 2015, batting .278/.328/.352 with five RBI and one stolen base.

=== Milwaukee Brewers ===
Nelson signed a minor league contract with the Milwaukee Brewers on May 9, 2015. He played in 29 games for the Triple-A Colorado Springs Sky Sox, batting .143/.200/.243 with one home run, 10 RBI, and one stolen base. Nelson was released by the Brewers organization on June 17.

=== Washington Nationals ===
Nelson signed a minor league contract with the Washington Nationals on June 21, 2015. In 28 appearances for the Triple-A Syracuse Chiefs, he slashed .277/.337/.479 with three home runs, 14 RBI, and one stolen base. Nelson was released by the Nationals organization on July 25.

=== Colorado Rockies (second stint) ===
On February 15, 2016, Nelson signed a minor league contract to return to the Colorado Rockies organization. In 69 games for the Triple–A Albuquerque Isotopes, he batted .232/.273/.310 with three home runs and 33 RBI. Nelson elected free agency following the season on November 7.

=== Sugar Land Skeeters ===
On March 21, 2017, Nelson signed with the Sugar Land Skeeters of the Atlantic League of Professional Baseball. In 24 appearances for the Skeeters, Nelson hit .261/.307/.359 with two home runs, 11 RBI, and one stolen base.

=== Kansas City Royals ===
On May 15, 2017, Nelson signed a minor league deal with the Kansas City Royals.

== Coaching career ==
Nelson was hired to serve as the bench coach for the Northwest Arkansas Naturals, the Double-A affiliate of the Kansas City Royals, for the 2018 season. He was named assistant hitting coach for the 2024 season. In 2025, Nelson was named assistant hitting coach for the Arizona Complex League Royals, Kansas City's rookie-level affiliate. On January 16, 2026, Nelson was promoted to serve as the hitting coach for the Low-A Columbia Fireflies.

== Awards and honors ==
2008	AFL Rising Stars
2007	Baseball America High Class A All-Star
2007	CAL Post-Season All-Star
2006	SAL Mid-Season All-Star
