= Mark Ellis (baseball) =

American baseball player (born 1977)

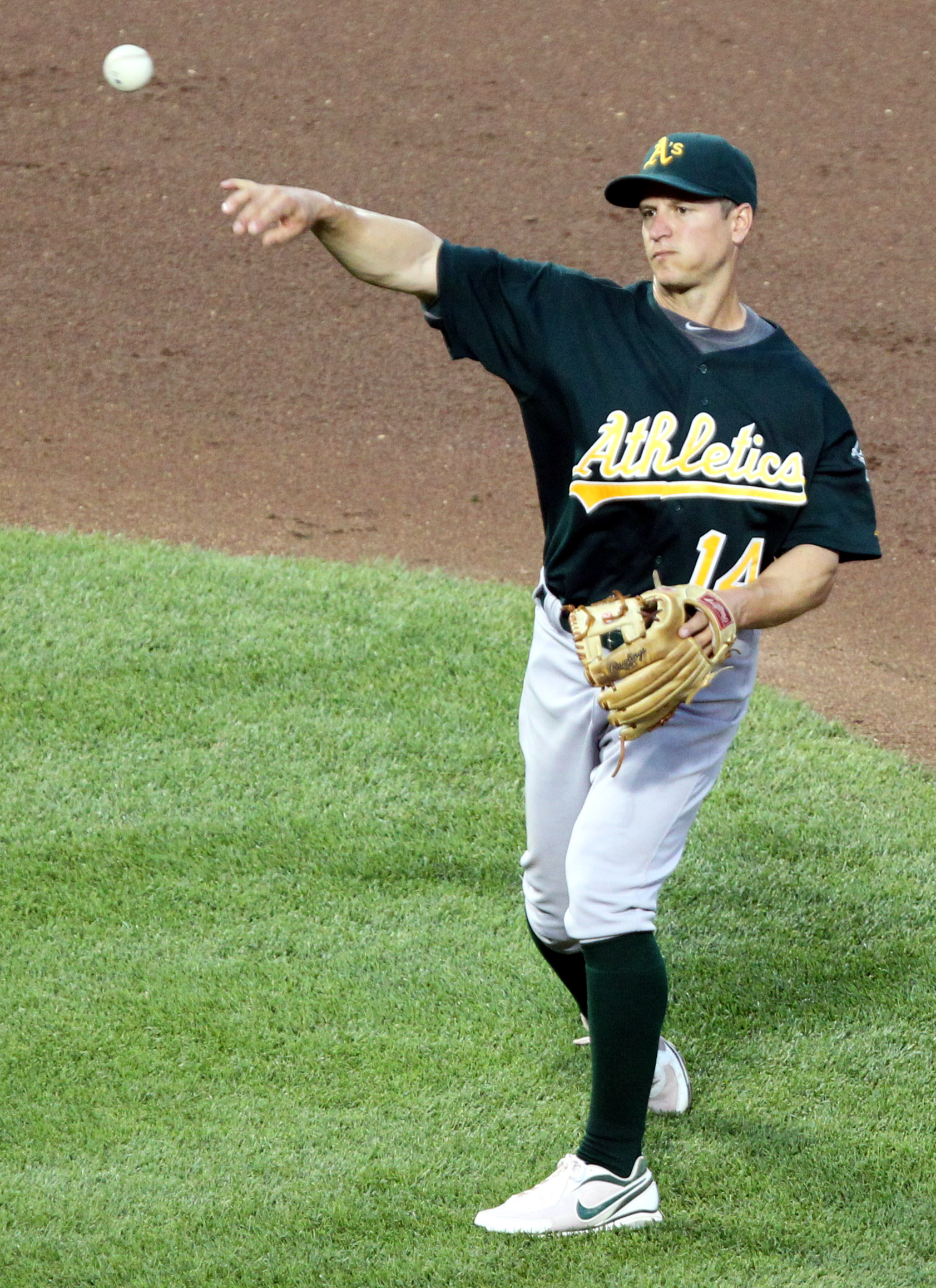
- Ellis with the Oakland Athletics
- Second baseman
- Born: June 6, 1977 (age 49); Rapid City, South Dakota, U.S.
- Batted: Right Threw: Right

MLB debut
- April 9, 2002, for the Oakland Athletics

Last MLB appearance
- September 27, 2014, for the St. Louis Cardinals

MLB statistics
- Batting average: .262
- Home runs: 105
- Runs batted in: 550
- Stats at Baseball Reference

Teams
- Oakland Athletics (2002–2003, 2005–2011); Colorado Rockies (2011); Los Angeles Dodgers (2012–2013); St. Louis Cardinals (2014)

Career highlights and awards
- Athletics Hall of Fame

Mark William Ellis (born June 6, 1977) is an American former professional baseball second baseman. He played the majority of his Major League Baseball (MLB) career for the Oakland Athletics, and also appeared for the Colorado Rockies, Los Angeles Dodgers and St. Louis Cardinals. Ellis posted a career .991 fielding percentage, the fifth-best all-time for a second baseman in MLB history at the time of his retirement.

== Early career ==
Ellis was born in Rapid City, South Dakota. Ellis graduated from Stevens High School in Rapid City in 1995. Also in Ellis' graduating class was WNBA star Becky Hammon. They were voted by their peers as male and female "Class Athletes" of the '95 graduating class.

Ellis is one of three players to have made it to the Major Leagues who played for the Rapid City Post 22 American Legion baseball program; the others are Kelvin Torve and Dave Collins. As a 16-year-old, Ellis was the starting shortstop for the 1993 Rapid City Post 22 varsity "Hardhat" baseball team that touted a 70–5 record and won the national title in Roseburg, Oregon. In the back-to-back years (1994 & 1995), Ellis earned South Dakota American Legion Player of the Year honors. In 2012, American Legion Baseball named Ellis the program's Graduate of the Year.

He went on to play for the University of Florida Gators baseball program and was the MVP of the Gainesville regional at the 1998 College World Series. Although he has played his Major League career at second base, he was the starting third baseman at Florida, where that position was nicknamed "Ellis Island" due to Ellis' tremendous range and all-around fielding prowess.

Ellis was a ninth-round selection by the Kansas City Royals in the 1999 Major League Baseball draft. He played in the Royals' farm system in 1999 and 2000, where he was a Short-Season A All-Star in 1999 and a Carolina League All-Star in 2000.

On January 1, 2001, he was acquired by the Oakland Athletics along with outfielder Johnny Damon and pitcher Cory Lidle in a three-team trade with the Tampa Bay Devil Rays and the Royals for outfielder Ben Grieve, shortstop Ángel Berroa, and catcher A. J. Hinch. In 2001, with the Triple-A Sacramento River Cats, he hit .273 in 132 games with 10 home runs.

== Major league career ==
=== Oakland Athletics ===
Ellis made his Major League debut on April 9, 2002, for the Athletics against the Texas Rangers, pinch-running in the eighth inning for Jeremy Giambi. He remained in the game and ground out to short in the 10th inning. He recorded his first base hit, in his first Major League start, on April 18 against the Anaheim Angels, a single to left field off of Ramón Ortiz. His first home run was hit on June 28, 2002, off of San Francisco Giants pitcher Jay Witasick. For the 2002 season, his batting was .272 in 98 games. Ellis hit .248 the following season, but missed the entire 2004 season due to a torn labrum in his right shoulder resulting from a collision with shortstop Bobby Crosby in a spring training game against the Chicago Cubs. In 2005, he returned to the Athletics and led the team in batting average (.316), on-base percentage (.384), and slugging average (.477) as the team's regular second baseman.

In 2006 Ellis established what was, at the time, a single-season American League record for a second baseman with a .99685 fielding percentage, beating the mark previously set by Brett Boone in 1997. For the 2006 season the Rawlings Gold Glove Award for second basemen went to Mark Grudzielanek of the Kansas City Royals, who finished with a lower fielding percentage of .994, though won the award as a result of winning the vote of MLB managers and coaches; Ellis’ single-season record was broken the following year by Plácido Polanco of the Detroit Tigers, who made no errors during the season for a perfect fielding percentage of 1.000.

Ellis missed most of the A's 2006 post-season due to a hand injury suffered during Game 2 of the American League Division Series against the Minnesota Twins.

On June 4, 2007, Ellis became only the sixth player in Oakland Athletics history to hit for the cycle. On July 23, 2007, he had his first career multi-home run game against the Los Angeles Angels of Anaheim. On August 5, 2007, he tied the A's team record for consecutive error-less games by a second baseman at 70 games.

Ellis missed the last two months of the 2008 season due to cartilage damage in his shoulder. He underwent successful surgery that also fixed a torn labrum from a previous injury.

In October 2008, the Athletics signed Ellis to an $11 million contract through 2010, with an option of extending the deal an additional season.

=== Colorado Rockies ===
On June 30, 2011, Ellis was traded to the Colorado Rockies for Bruce Billings and a player to be named later. On September 30, the Athletics announced that they received 22-year-old outfielder Eliezer Mesa to complete the deal.

=== Los Angeles Dodgers ===
On November 15, 2011, Ellis signed a two-year, $8.75 million contract with the Los Angeles Dodgers.

After a strong start, Ellis's leg was severely injured on May 20, 2012, by a hard slide from Tyler Greene of the St. Louis Cardinals while Ellis was attempting to turn a double play. Initially saying that he was okay, Ellis did not go to the hospital until the following day when he experienced extreme discomfort and swelling in his lower leg. After performing a fasciotomy to allow room within his leg for the swollen muscle tissue, his doctor later said that Ellis might have lost his leg if the surgery had been performed only six or seven hours later than it was. Doctors said Ellis' injury was a rare one for athletes, but more common for victims of car accidents. Ellis was expected to be out for six weeks and did not rejoin the Dodgers until July 4.

Overall, he appeared in 110 games for the Dodgers in 2012, hitting .258 with 7 home runs and 31 RBI.

In 2013, Ellis remained relatively healthy and played in 126 games. He hit .270 with 6 home runs and 48 RBI, helping the Dodgers win the National League West Division's championship and a first-round playoff series over the Atlanta Braves before the team was eliminated in the National League Championship Series.

=== St. Louis Cardinals ===
Ellis signed with the St. Louis Cardinals on December 16, 2013. He was placed on the disabled list with an oblique strain on August 19, 2014, after hitting a career-low .192 for the Cardinals.

On February 25, 2015, Ellis announced his retirement.

== Pop culture ==
- In the 2011 film, Moneyball, focusing on the Oakland A's analytical approach to economically assembling a competitive baseball team, the role of Mark Ellis is played by Brent Dohling, the baseball coach of Tarbut V' Torah.

== Personal life ==
Ellis and his wife, Sarah, have three children. They purchased a home in Scottsdale, Arizona, in 2007, but sold it in 2020.

== See also ==
- List of Major League Baseball players to hit for the cycle
- List of Florida Gators baseball players

Achievements
Preceded by Fred Lewis	Hitting for the cycle June 4, 2007	Succeeded by Aubrey Huff
