= Wilin Rosario =

Dominican baseball player (born 1989)

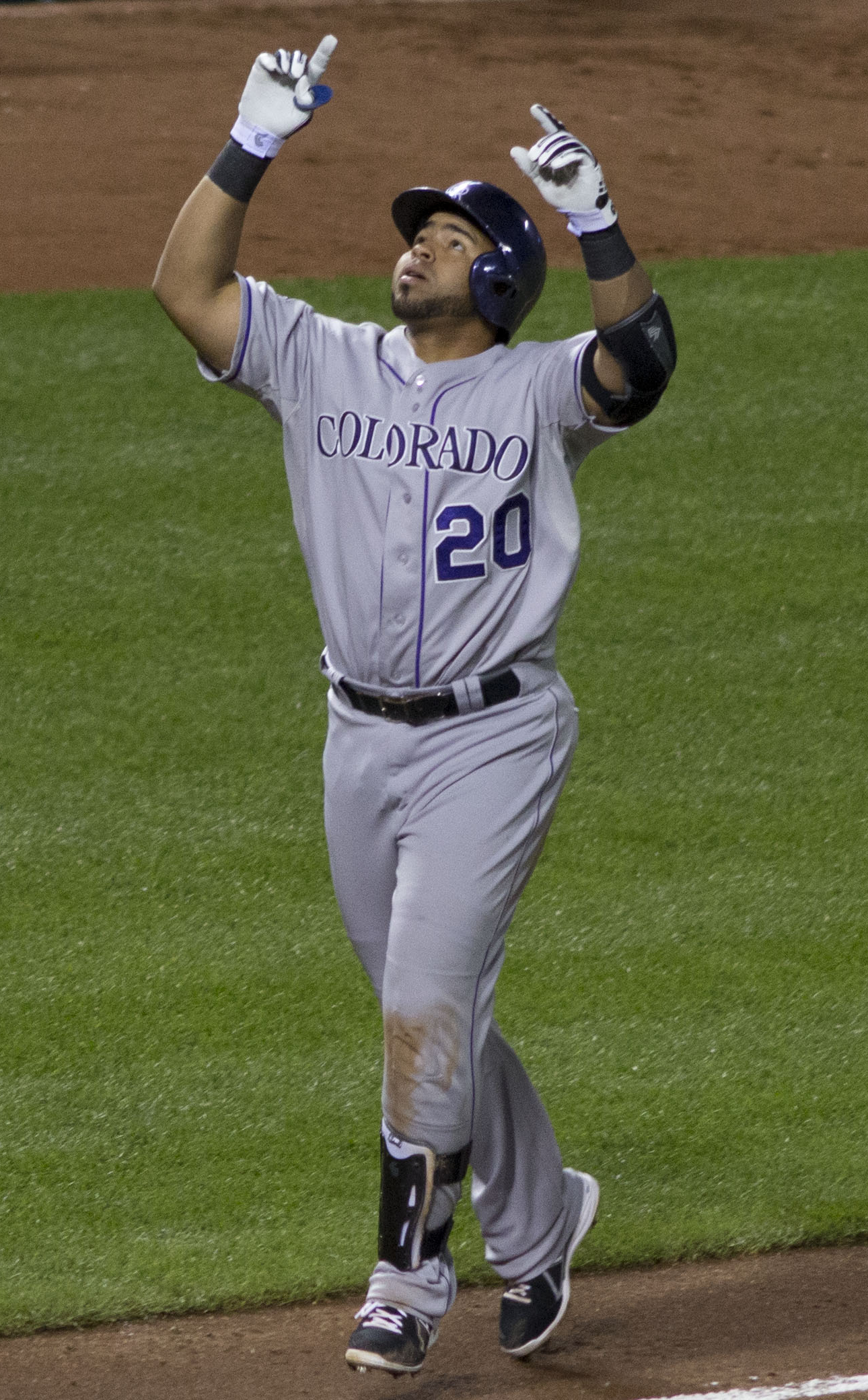
- Rosario with the Colorado Rockies in 2013
- Catcher / First baseman
- Born: February 23, 1989 (age 37); Bonao, Dominican Republic
- Batted: Right Threw: Right

Professional debut
- MLB: September 6, 2011, for the Colorado Rockies
- KBO: April 1, 2016, for the Hanwha Eagles
- NPB: March 30, 2018, for the Hanshin Tigers
- CPBL: April 3, 2022, for the Uni-President Lions

Last appearance
- MLB: October 4, 2015, for the Colorado Rockies
- KBO: September 23, 2017, for the Hanwha Eagles
- NPB: September 18, 2018, for the Hanshin Tigers
- CPBL: July 10, 2022, for the Uni-President Lions

MLB statistics
- Batting average: .273
- Home runs: 71
- Runs batted in: 241

KBO statistics
- Batting average: .330
- Home runs: 70
- Runs batted in: 231

NPB statistics
- Batting average: .242
- Home runs: 8
- Runs batted in: 40

CPBL statistics
- Batting average: .357
- Home runs: 1
- Runs batted in: 4
- Stats at Baseball Reference

Teams
- Colorado Rockies (2011–2015); Hanwha Eagles (2016–2017); Hanshin Tigers (2018); Uni-President Lions (2022)

Wilin Arismendy Rosario Hernández (born February 23, 1989) is a Dominican former professional baseball catcher and first baseman. He played in Major League Baseball (MLB) for the Colorado Rockies, the KBO League for the Hanwha Eagles, Nippon Professional Baseball (NPB) for the Hanshin Tigers, and the Chinese Professional Baseball League (CPBL) for the Uni-President Lions.

== Career ==
=== Colorado Rockies ===
Rosario signed with the Colorado Rockies as an international free agent on February 13, 2006, and made his professional debut that year with the Dominican Summer League Rockies. In 2008, after playing for the Casper Ghosts, he was named a Pioneer League All-Star and the best prospect in the league by Baseball America. After an injury-shortened 2009 season, he was a Texas League postseason All-Star in 2010.

In 2011, Rosario was again a Texas League All-Star and played in the All-Star Futures Game. After spending five months in Double-A, on September 6, he made his MLB debut. He batted 0-for-3 with a walk and a run scored, as his Rockies defeated the Arizona Diamondbacks, 8–3. Rosario appeared in a total of 16 games for the Rockies that season. He posted a .204 batting average, hit 3 home runs and totalled 8 RBI.

During the 2012 season, Rosario played in 117 games with the Rockies. He finished 4th in the 2012 NL Rookie of the year voting, after hitting .270 with 28 home runs and 71 RBI. Rosario topped all MLB catchers in home runs with 28 in 2012.

In 2013, Rosario set career highs in games played (121), batting average (.292), RBIs (79) and hits (131). In 2014, his production dropped off, regressing in power and in average despite striking out less. His defense behind the plate did not improve as well, leading the majors for the third straight season in passed balls.

With the addition of Nick Hundley in the 2015 season, the Rockies moved Rosario to first base full-time, only playing catcher in case of a game emergency and occasionally pinch hitting. He played in 87 games, batting .268 with 6 home runs. He was designated for assignment by the Rockies after the 2015 season, becoming a free agent on December 1.

=== Hanwha Eagles ===
Rosario signed with the Hanwha Eagles of the Korea Baseball Organization for the 2016 season. In two seasons with the Eagles, Rosario hit .330 with 70 home runs and 231 runs batted in.

=== Hanshin Tigers ===
On December 14, 2017, Rosario signed with the Hanshin Tigers of Nippon Professional Baseball (NPB).

=== Minnesota Twins ===
On February 1, 2019, Rosario signed a minor league contract with the Minnesota Twins organization. In 105 games for the Triple–A Rochester Red Wings, he slashed .300/.339/.504 with 20 home runs and 91 RBI. Rosario elected free agency following the season on November 4.

=== Pericos de Puebla ===
On January 16, 2020, Rosario signed with the Pericos de Puebla of the Mexican League. Rosario did not play in a game in 2020 due to the cancellation of the Mexican League season because of the COVID-19 pandemic. In 31 games, Rosario slashed .319/.369/.521 with 5 home runs and 17 RBI before he was released by Puebla on July 13, 2021.

=== Uni-President Lions ===
On January 6, 2022, Rosario signed with the Uni-President Lions of the Chinese Professional Baseball League. He only played in 5 games before he suffered a leg injury on April 8. Rosario was released by the team on June 2.

=== Mariachis de Guadalajara ===
On July 5, 2022, Rosario signed with the Mariachis de Guadalajara of the Mexican League. Rosario appeared in 27 games for Guadalajara, hitting a robust .413/.481/.641 with five home runs and 29 RBI.

On February 15, 2023, Rosario was released by the Mariachis.
