= Franklin Morales =

Venezuelan baseball player (born 1986)

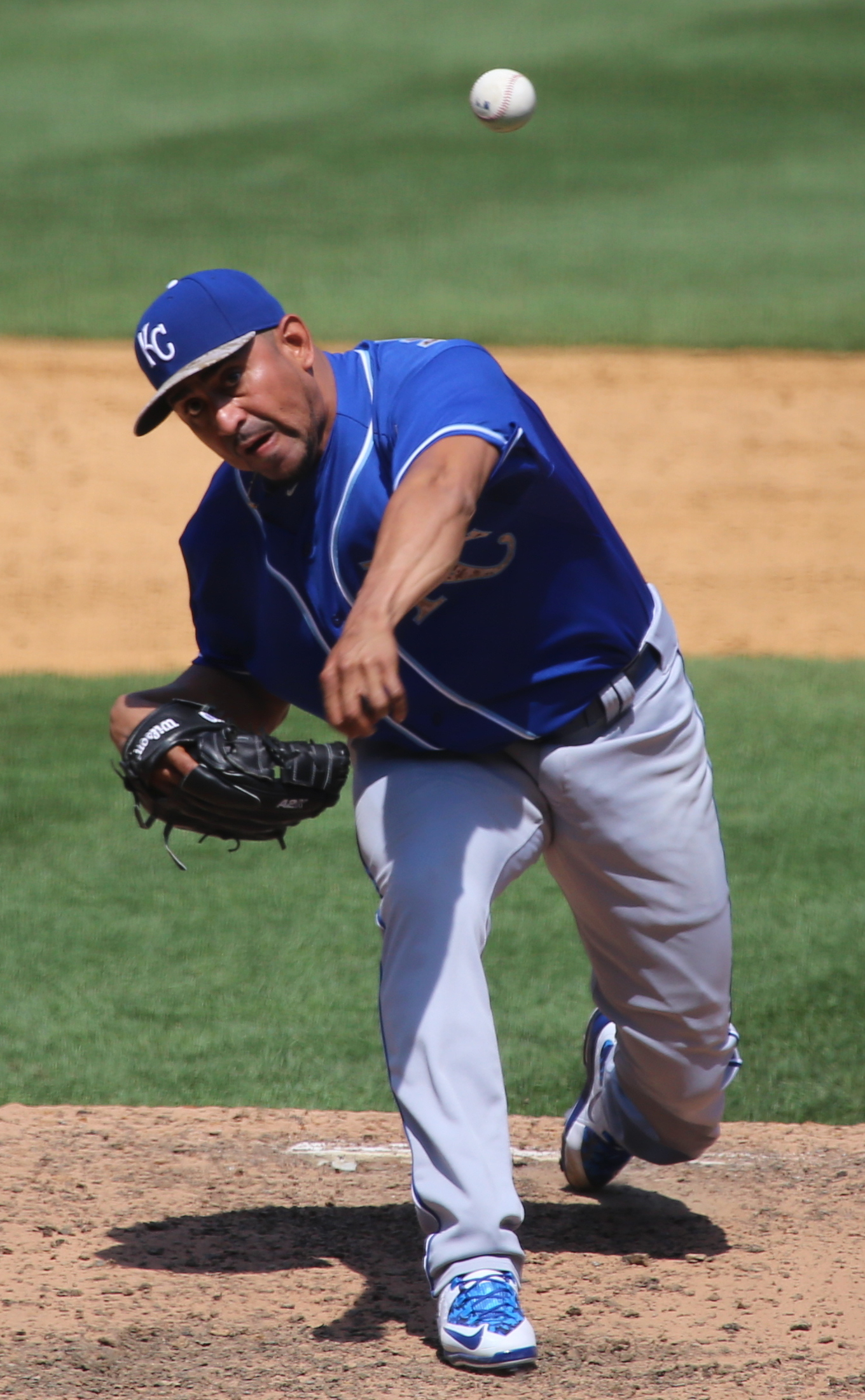
- Morales with the Kansas City Royals
- Pitcher
- Born: January 24, 1986 (age 40); San Juan de los Morros, Venezuela
- Batted: Left Threw: Left

MLB debut
- August 18, 2007, for the Colorado Rockies

Last MLB appearance
- July 31, 2016, for the Toronto Blue Jays

MLB statistics
- Win–loss record: 23–30
- Earned run average: 4.56
- Strikeouts: 385
- Stats at Baseball Reference

Teams
- Colorado Rockies (2007–2011); Boston Red Sox (2011–2013); Colorado Rockies (2014); Kansas City Royals (2015); Toronto Blue Jays (2016)

Career highlights and awards
- 2× World Series champion (2013, 2015)

Franklin Miguel Morales (born January 24, 1986) is a Venezuelan former professional baseball pitcher. He played in Major League Baseball (MLB) for the Colorado Rockies, Boston Red Sox, Kansas City Royals, and Toronto Blue Jays.

== Professional career ==
=== Colorado Rockies ===
A power-throwing left-hander, Morales signed with the Colorado Rockies as an international free agent on November 13, 2002. He made his Major League debut on August 18, 2007, against the Los Angeles Dodgers. He pitched 5 1/3 innings, gave up one run, but got a no-decision. In 2007, Morales was selected to the All-Star Futures Game at AT&T Park in San Francisco. Morales made 8 starts for the Rockies during his rookie campaign, going 3-2 with a 3.43 ERA and 26 strikeouts. He was also part of the Rockies' 25-man active roster for the postseason where the team went to the World Series for the first time ever, but lost to the Red Sox in a 4-game sweep.

On April 29, 2008, Morales was optioned to the Rockies' Triple-A affiliate, the Colorado Springs Sky Sox, in response to a sub-par performance during the early parts of the season. He made only 5 starts on the year for Colorado, struggling to a 1-2 record and 6.39 ERA with 9 strikeouts across 25 1/3 innings pitched.

In spring training in 2009, Morales led all pitchers in pickoffs, with 5, in 28 innings.. He began the regular season in the starting rotation, but after struggling early he was optioned to Triple-A Colorado Springs. In 40 appearances for the Rockies, Morales logged a 3-2 record and 4.50 ERA with 41 strikeouts and 7 saves over 40 innings of work.

Morales made 35 appearances out of the bullpen for Colorado during the 2010 campaign, struggling to an 0-4 record and 6.28 ERA with 27 strikeouts and 3 saves across 28 2/3 innings pitched. He pitched in 14 contests for the Rockies in 2011, registering a 3.86 ERA with 11 strikeouts across 14 innings.

=== Boston Red Sox ===
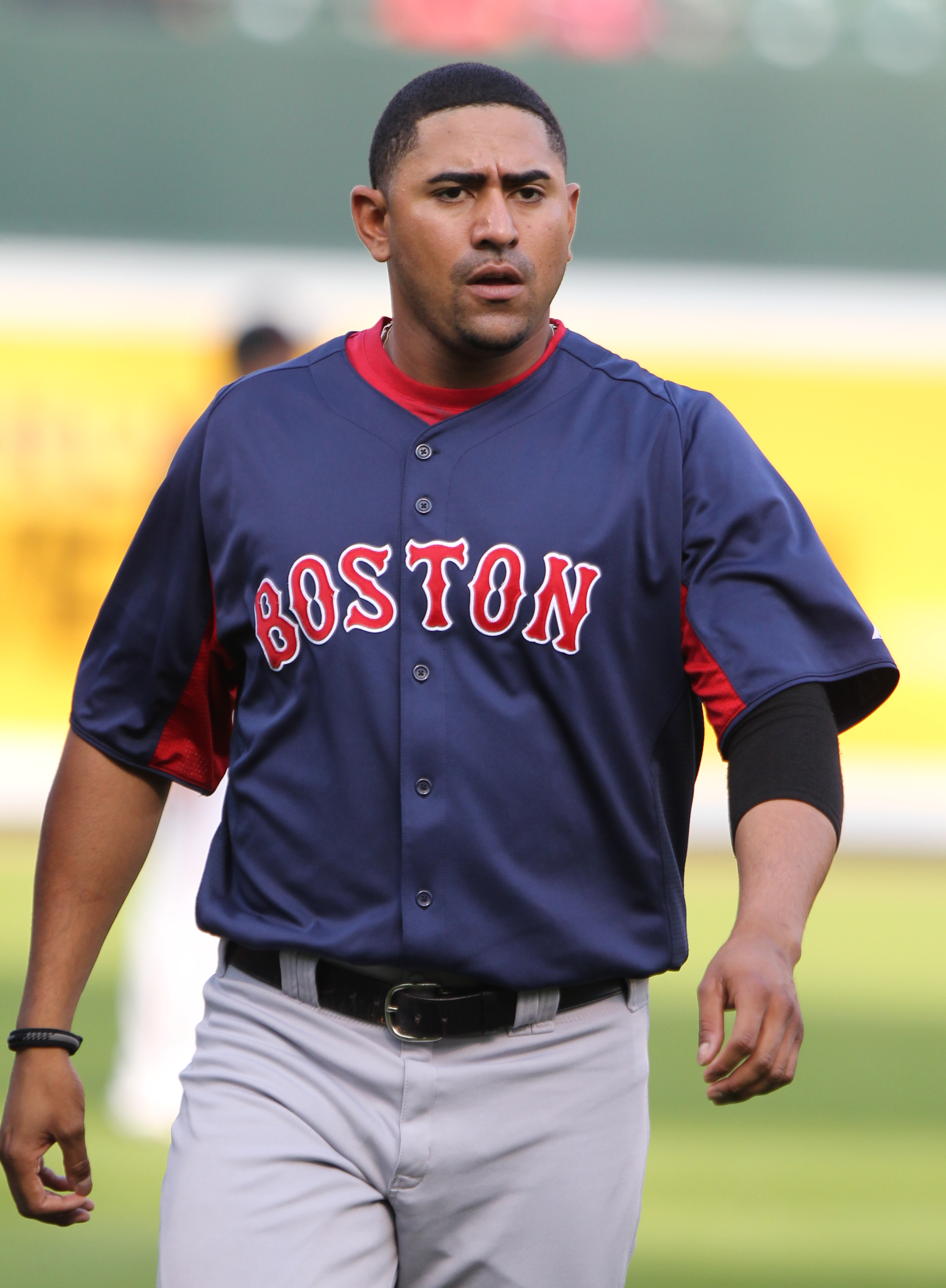
Morales during his tenure with the Boston Red Sox in 2011

On May 19, 2011, Morales was traded to the Boston Red Sox in exchange for a player to be named later or cash considerations. On May 22, he made his Red Sox debut in a game against the Chicago Cubs. Morales finished the 2011 season with Boston making 36 relief appearances and going 1-1 with a 3.62 ERA and 31 strikeouts. Overall in 2011 combined with two teams, Morales made a total of 50 appearances going 1-2 with a 3.69 ERA and 42 strikeouts.

On January 16, 2012, Morales signed a one-year contract worth $850K with the Red Sox, avoiding arbitration. During the 2012 season, Morales made 37 appearances (9 starts) going 3-4 with a 3.77 ERA and 76 strikeouts. Near the end of the 2012 season, Morales was diagnosed with a shoulder injury. He had a starting job before September and stuck with it until his injury. In the off-season he trained to be a starter for 2013.

In 2013, Morales made 20 appearances (1 start) going 2-2 with a 4.62 ERA and 21 strikeouts. Morales made 3 appearances in the postseason. In his final appearance in a Red Sox uniform, he relieved Clay Buchholz in Game 6 of the ALCS. With the Red Sox ahead 1-0 in the 6th inning and two inherited runners on base, Morales walked Prince Fielder on 4 pitches, then fell behind Victor Martinez before yielding a 2-run Wall Ball single. Morales was replaced by Brandon Workman who ended the inning without further damage. The Sox won the game when Shane Victorino hit a 7th inning grand slam. Morales did not pitch in the World Series as the Red Sox won the championship over the St. Louis Cardinals.

=== Colorado Rockies (second stint) ===
On December 18, 2013, Morales was traded back to the Colorado Rockies along with minor league pitcher Chris Martin in exchange for utility man Jonathan Herrera.

After being primarily a relief pitcher for the Red Sox in his previous three years, Morales found his way back into a starting role to begin the 2014 season with the Rockies; he made his season debut on April 3 as the team's fourth starter, giving up 3 earned runs and 8 hits in 5 1/3 innings in a no decision against the Miami Marlins. In 38 appearances for the Rockies during the 2014 campaign, Morales posted a 6-9 record and 5.37 ERA with 100 strikeouts across 142 1/3 innings pitched.

=== Kansas City Royals ===
Morales signed a minor league contract with the Kansas City Royals on February 19, 2015 and made the team out of spring training. He got his first win with the team on April 19, throwing the final two pitches of an at bat to Brett Lawrie after Kelvin Herrera was ejected for throwing at Lawrie. Morales finished the 2015 season with a 3.18 ERA, 41 strikeouts, and a 4-2 record in 67 relief appearances. With the Royals finishing the season 95-67, the team clinched the AL Central and eventually won the 2015 World Series against the New York Mets, their first championship in 30 years. It was the second championship Morales won in his career.

=== Toronto Blue Jays ===
On March 4, 2016, Morales signed a minor league contract with the Milwaukee Brewers that included an invitation to spring training. He was released prior to the start of the season on March 28.

On April 2, 2016, Morales signed a one-year, $2 million contract with the Toronto Blue Jays. After making two appearances for the Blue Jays, Morales was placed on the 15-day disabled list with shoulder fatigue. He was later transferred to the 60-day disabled list. Morales began a rehab assignment in June, and on July 22, was activated by the Blue Jays. On August 1, Morales was designated for assignment. He was released by the Blue Jays on August 9.

=== Acereros de Monclova ===
On June 22, 2017, Morales signed with the Acereros de Monclova of the Mexican League. In 8 games (6 starts) for Monclova, he compiled a 6-0 record and 1.62 ERA with 27 strikeouts over 39 innings of work. Morales became a free agent after the season.

On February 9, 2024, after six years of inactivity Morales signed with the Toros de Tijuana of the Mexican League; however, the signing was never made official, and Morales remained a free agent.

== See also ==
- List of Major League Baseball players from Venezuela
