= Greg Reynolds =

American baseball player (born 1985)

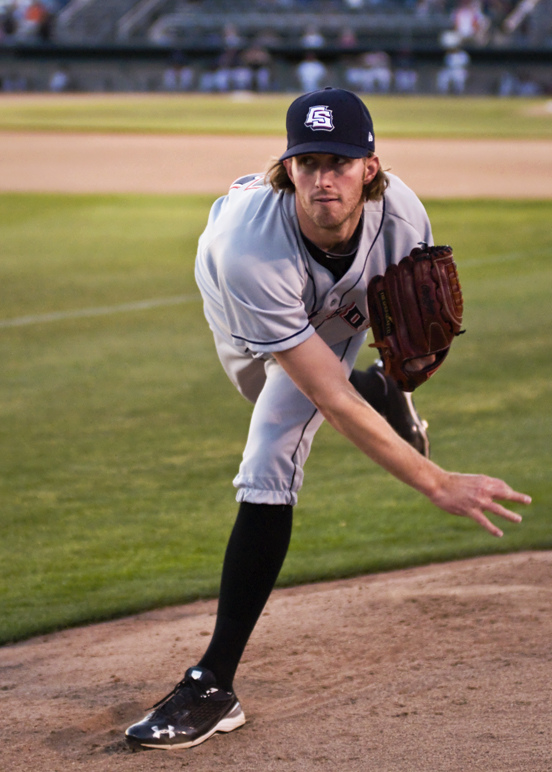
- Reynolds with the Colorado Springs Sky Sox
- Pitcher
- Born: July 3, 1985 (age 41); Pacifica, California, U.S.
- Batted: Right Threw: Right

Professional debut
- MLB: May 11, 2008, for the Colorado Rockies
- NPB: March 30, 2014, for the Saitama Seibu Lions

Last appearance
- MLB: September 29, 2013, for the Cincinnati Reds
- NPB: September 3, 2014, for the Saitama Seibu Lions

MLB statistics
- Win–loss record: 6–11
- Earned run average: 7.01
- Strikeouts: 53

NPB statistics
- Win–loss record: 3–7
- Earned run average: 5.46
- Strikeouts: 29
- Stats at Baseball Reference

Teams
- Colorado Rockies (2008, 2011); Cincinnati Reds (2013); Saitama Seibu Lions (2014)

Gregory Adam Reynolds (born July 3, 1985) is an American former professional baseball pitcher. He played in Major League Baseball (MLB) for the Colorado Rockies and Cincinnati Reds, and in Nippon Professional Baseball (NPB) for the Saitama Seibu Lions.

== Amateur career ==
Reynolds was drafted by the Philadelphia Phillies out of Terra Nova High School in the 41st round of the 2003 MLB draft, but he instead decided to attend Stanford University. In 2004 and 2005, he played collegiate summer baseball with the Bourne Braves of the Cape Cod Baseball League. He was then selected by the Colorado Rockies as the second overall selection in the first round of the 2006 MLB draft.

== Professional career ==
=== Colorado Rockies ===
Reynolds made his Major League Baseball debut on May 11, 2008, in a 6–1 road loss against the San Diego Padres. He allowed four earned runs on six hits and struck out one batter in 5 2/3 innings. On June 7, Reynolds picked up his first career win and hit as a pitcher, in a 7–2 home victory over the Milwaukee Brewers. He pitched six innings, allowing two earned runs on four hits, with no strikeouts. His first career hit, a double, occurred in the bottom of the second inning off Brewers pitcher Dave Bush.

In 2009, Reynolds appeared in just one game due to injury. In 2010, he split time between the High-A Modesto Nuts and Double-A Tulsa Drillers, compiling a 8–6 record and 4.74 ERA with 51 strikeouts in 100 2/3 innings pitched across 19 starts.

On May 22, 2011, Reynolds was called up to replace struggling Felipe Paulino. Reynolds went 3-0 for the Rockies but with an ERA of 6.19 in 13 games. He was sent outright to the Triple-A Colorado Springs Sky Sox on October 5.

=== Texas Rangers ===
On January 5, 2012, Reynolds was traded to the Texas Rangers for Chad Tracy. He elected free agency following the season on November 2.

=== Cincinnati Reds ===
On January 10, 2013, Reynolds signed a minor league contract with the Cincinnati Reds. He began the season with Triple-A Louisville, where in 18 starts before his callup, he went 10–2 with a 2.54 ERA, striking out 79 in 127 1/3 innings. On July 23, Reynolds was called up to start the second game of a doubleheader against the San Francisco Giants. In his start, he went 5 innings giving up 5 runs, taking the loss. On July 28, he was designated for assignment. He cleared waivers and was sent outright to Triple-A Louisville Bats on July 31. Reynolds had his contract selected to the major league roster again on August 25. He became a free agent following the season.

=== Saitama Seibu Lions ===
On December 27, 2013, Reynolds signed with the Saitama Seibu Lions of Nippon Professional Baseball. In 12 starts for Seibu, he posted a 3–7 record and 5.46 ERA with 29 strikeouts over 61 innings of work. Reynolds was released by the Lions on September 20, 2014.

=== San Diego Padres ===
On February 11, 2016, Reynolds signed a minor league contract by the San Diego Padres. In 5 starts for the Triple-A El Paso Chihuahuas, he struggled to a 1–3 record and 7.30 ERA with five strikeouts across 24 2/3 innings pitched. Reynolds was released by the Padres organization on May 6.

== Personal life ==
Reynolds appeared on an episode of MythBusters titled "Battle of the Sexes: Round 2" as a professional pitcher.
