= Grand Junction Jackalopes =

American minor-league professional baseball team

- Founded in 1978 in Butte, Montana; Based in Grand Junction, Colorado since 2012

Minor league affiliations
- Class: Independent (from 2021)
- Previous classes: Rookie (1978–1985, 1987–2020)
- Previous leagues: Pioneer League (1978–1985, 1987–2025)

Major league affiliations
- Team: Independent (from 2021)
- Previous teams: Colorado Rockies (2001–2020); Anaheim Angels (1997–2000); Tampa Bay Devil Rays (1996); Co-op (1978, 1985, 1987, 1993–1995); Texas Rangers (1988–1992); Seattle Mariners (1984); Kansas City Royals (1982–1983); Milwaukee Brewers (1979–1981)

Minor league titles
- League titles (2): 1981; 2022
- Division titles (4): 1981; 1988; 1989; 2018; 2022

Team data
- Name: Grand Junction Jackalopes (2023–2025)
- Previous names: Grand Junction Rockies (2012–2022); Casper Ghosts (2008–2011); Casper Rockies (2001–2007); Butte Copper Kings (1978–1985, 1987–2000)
- Colors: Purple majesty, sky blue, desert sunset
- Mascot: Jake the Jacked-alope
- Ballpark: Suplizio Field (2012–2025)
- Previous parks: Mike Lansing Field (2001–2011); George Tani Field (2001); Alumni Coliseum (1978–1985, 1987–2000)
- President: Mick Ritter
- Manager: Frank Gonzales
- Website: gjjackalopes.com

The Grand Junction Jackalopes were an independent baseball team of the Pioneer League, which is not affiliated with Major League Baseball (MLB) but is an MLB Partner League. They were located in Grand Junction, Colorado, and played their home games at Suplizio Field. They were formerly named the Rockies, after the Colorado Rockies, who were their major league affiliate from 2001 to 2020 prior to the league becoming independent.

== Franchise history ==
The Butte Copper Kings, named for the once-powerful owners of the copper mines of Butte, Montana, began play in the Pioneer League in 1978 as a co-op team with players from the Philadelphia Phillies, Oakland Athletics, Seattle Mariners, and Texas Rangers organizations as well as a few free agents.

Beginning in 1987, the franchise had been operated by Silverbow Baseball. It was sold in 1996 to the Goldklang Group in a move necessary to stem conflict-of-interest issues when Silverbow head Jim McCurdy had taken the position of President of the Pioneer League in 1994. Silverbow had attempted to sell the franchise in 1994 to investors from California, but the deal fell through when it was determined that Silverbow owned a lesser percentage of the franchise than he had purported to own.

Following the 2000 season, the team relocated to Casper, Wyoming as the Casper Rockies (and was renamed the Ghosts before the 2008 season,) and affiliated with Colorado.

On January 13, 2011, Casper Professional Baseball Club, LLC announced the sale of the team to Monfort Investment Group, a group headed by Colorado Rockies General Partners. On October 17, 2011, Grand Junction city officials unanimously approved a lease agreement to the team, making Suplizio Field home to the newly renamed Grand Junction Rockies.

Logo of the Grand Junction Rockies, used until 2022

In conjunction with a contraction of Minor League Baseball in 2021, the Pioneer League was converted from an MLB-affiliated Rookie Advanced league to an independent baseball league and granted status as an MLB Partner League, with Grand Junction continuing as a member.

On November 4, 2022, the team officially announced their new name of the Grand Junction Jackalopes.

In 2025, the Jackalopes announced that they would adopt the name Grand Junction Humpback Chubs, after a fish found in the Colorado River, for Wednesday home games.

The Jackalopes announced they will be relocating from Grand Junction to a new location in 2026. They were replaced with a travel team for the 2026 season and have yet to reveal their new location.

== Roster ==
Grand Junction Jackalopes roster
Active (25-man) roster		Coaching staff
Pitchers: 12 Josh Agnew; 27 Cody Clark; 28 Cade Crader; 33 Jimmy Dobrash; 35 Israel Fuentes; 4 Tyler Johnson; 31 Alex Leach; 23 Brett Matthews; 24 Trevin Reynolds; 10 Chase Stratton; 30 Luke Summers; 16 Michael Townsend; 49 James Varela; 32 Aydan Alger	Catchers: 19 Austin Elder; 25 Tyler Sandoval; Infielders: 6 Jake Anderson; 8 Vinny Esposito; 1 Kevin Maldonado; 2 Alexis Monge; 29 Luke Roskam; Outfielders: 18 Josh Elver; 21 Jose Gutierrez; 20 Dondrei Hubbard; 17 Frankie Jezioro; 5 Rolando Martinez; 11 Nate Scantlin	Manager: -- Jimmy Johnson; Coaches: -- Bobby Jenks (pitching); -- Joe Mikulik (hitting); -- Jordan Pacheco (hitting); Disabled list; ‡ Inactive list; § Suspended list; Roster updated April 18, 2024 Transactions

== Notable players ==
Butte Copper Kings, Casper Rockies and Casper Ghosts players who have made appearances on Major League teams:

- Cecil Fielder
- Omar Vizquel
- Rich Aurilia
- Jake Bird
- Julio Franco
- Bobby Jenks
- Robb Nen
- Roger Pavlik
- Francisco Rodríguez
- Kevin Seitzer
- Mike Napoli
- Alfredo Amézaga
- Andy Barkett
- Andy Beene
- Mark Brandenburg
- Mickey Callaway
- Juan Castillo
- Bryan Clutterbuck
- Cris Colón
- John Davis
- Tom Edens
- Joey Eischen
- Trevor Enders
- Scott Eyre
- Monty Fariss
- Jeff Frye
- Benji Gil
- Donald Harris
- Todd Helton
- Matt Hensley
- Dion James
- Kerry Lacy
- Terrell Lowery
- Bill Lyons
- David Manning
- Rob Maurer
- Brian Meadows
- Ángel Miranda
- Alberto Árias
- Darren Clarke
- Manuel Corpas
- Dexter Fowler
- Jonathan Herrera
- Ubaldo Jiménez
- Franklin Morales
- Josh Newman
- Jayson Nix
- Jordan Pacheco
- Alex Serrano
- Ryan Shealy
- Seth Smith
- Ian Stewart
- Ryan Speier
- Jermaine Van Buren
- Eduardo Villacis
- Everth Cabrera
- Jhoulys Chacín
- Matt Daley
- Juan Morillo
- David Patton
- Esmil Rogers
- Pedro Strop
- Mike Timlin
- Eric Young, Jr.
- Wilin Rosario
- Ryan Mattheus
- Juan Nicasio
- Jon Gray
- Trevor Story
- Nolan Arenado
