= 2011 St. Louis Cardinals season =

Major League Baseball season

2011 St. Louis Cardinals
- World Series champions National League champions National League Wild Card winners
- League: National League
- Division: Central
- Ballpark: Busch Stadium
- City: St. Louis, Missouri
- Record: 90–72 (.556)
- Divisional place: 2nd
- Owners: William DeWitt, Jr. Drew Baur (1996 – Feb 20, 2011); Fred Hanser
- General managers: John Mozeliak
- Managers: Tony La Russa
- Television: Fox Sports Midwest (Dan McLaughlin, Al Hrabosky, Rick Horton)
- Radio: KMOX Newsradio (1120 AM) (Mike Shannon, John Rooney)

The 2011 St. Louis Cardinals season was the 130th season for the St. Louis Cardinals, a Major League Baseball franchise in St. Louis, Missouri. It was the 120th season for the Cardinals in the National League and their 6th at Busch Stadium III.

This was Tony La Russa's final season as Cardinals manager.

The Cardinals began their season at home against the San Diego Padres on March 31, following an 86–76 (.531) record and second-place finish in the National League Central in 2010. The team returned to postseason play in 2011 as the Wild Card team, after finishing second in the NL Central to the Milwaukee Brewers by six games. The Cardinals beat the Philadelphia Phillies in five games in the NLDS and the Milwaukee Brewers in six games in the NLCS. They defeated the Texas Rangers in the World Series in seven games.

== Offseason departures and acquisitions ==
Cardinals co-owner, team treasurer, and member of the board of directors Andrew N. "Drew" Baur died suddenly at his home at 66, in Gulf Stream, Florida on February 20, 2011.

=== Management ===
On October 18, 2010, manager Tony La Russa decided to return for his 16th season with the Cardinals after agreeing to terms for a new one-year contract, and a mutual option for a second year. Bullpen coach Marty Mason was not retained, but all the other coaches returned with extended contracts.

On November 2, 2010, the team named a bullpen coach to replace Mason: Derek Lilliquist, the team's pitching coordinator for the last three seasons. Also announced that day: Greg Hauck was promoted to head athletic trainer, while longtime head trainer Barry Weinberg assumed duties as assistant athletic trainer.

=== Hitters ===
On October 6, 2010, the Cardinals picked up the $16 million option on Albert Pujols.

On November 30, 2010, the Cardinals traded pitcher Blake Hawksworth for middle-infielder Ryan Theriot in a trade with Dodgers. They also signed free agent left-handed relief pitcher Brian Tallet. On December 12 the Cardinals cleared a space for Theriot at shortstop by trading incumbent shortstop Brendan Ryan to the Seattle Mariners for Class-A prospect Maikel Cleto.

On December 4, 2010, the Cardinals signed 34-year-old Lance Berkman (formerly with the Houston Astros and then Yankees in 2010) to a 1-year, $8 million deal. Berkman, who was slated to play right field regularly for the first time since 2004, had slumped to a .248 average in 2010 and had hit particularly poorly after his midseason trade to the New York Yankees. As a Cardinal in 2011, he hit 31 home runs and was named NL Comeback Player of the Year.

On December 14, 2010, the Cardinals signed catcher Gerald Laird to a one-year contract.

On January 15, 2011, Albert Pujols, through his agent Dan Lozano, told the Cardinals that the date to report to spring training (February 18) was the deadline to reach a deal on a new contract. Negotiations failed to produce a deal, and on February 16 Pujols suspended negotiations, citing an unwillingness to be distracted during the season, including spring training. Pujols received $16 million in 2011 and $111 million over his previous eight seasons. Pujols had asked for a 10-year deal, worth up to $300 million, averaging $30 million per year.

On January 21, 2011, the Cardinals signed backup infielder Nick Punto to a one-year contract for $750,000.

In a surprise announcement on February 4, the Cardinals signed former Cardinal Jim Edmonds (2000–07) to a minor-league contract, and an invitation to Spring training as a non-roster invitee. He hit 241 home runs (4th in rank) as a Cardinal in his eight years, made three All-Star teams (2000, 2003, 2005), and won six Gold Gloves (2000–05). He needed seven home runs to reach 400. On February 18, Edmonds announced his retirement from baseball, citing the risk of permanent damage in his comeback from Achilles tendon surgery.

=== Pitchers ===
On October 6, 2010, the Cardinals picked up the option on LH relief specialist Trever Miller after he vested his option with his 45th appearance in 2010 (57 G), and finished the season healthy.

On November 16, 2010, the Cardinals signed starter Jake Westbrook to a two-year deal through 2012 for $16.5 million, with a mutual option for 2013, and a full no-trade clause. The Cardinals had acquired Westbrook in a 2010 trade that sent Ryan Ludwick to the Padres.

On January 15, 2011, the Cardinals agreed to a one-year contract with reliever Kyle McClellan in avoiding arbitration. Salary was not announced.

The Cardinals suffered a severe setback at the beginning of spring training. On February 24, 2011, it was confirmed that ace pitcher Adam Wainwright needed Tommy John surgery on his right elbow after experiencing discomfort in throwing batting practice on February 21. It meant missing, at a minimum, the entirety of the 2011 season. Wainwright was coming off a 2010 season in which he won a career-high 20 games, made the All-Star game, and finished second in National League Cy Young Award voting. The February 28 surgery on Wainwright in St. Louis was described as 'successful.'

=== Other offseason developments: "Stand for Stan" ===
Starting in 2010, the Cardinals started a campaign to award longtime hero Stan Musial the Presidential Medal of Freedom. The initiative was nicknamed Stand for Stan. On February 15, 2011, the program came to fruition, as President Barack Obama awarded Musial the medal.

== Spring training ==
The Cardinals released their 2011 spring training schedule on December 3, 2010.St. Louis Cardinals Spring Training Schedule

The scheduled exhibition game on March 29, vs. their AA-level Springfield Cardinals team, was canceled the day before because bad weather was expected.

== Regular season ==
=== March–April ===
The Cardinals opened 2011 with a loss at home against the San Diego Padres on March 31, after leading 3–2 with two outs in the 9th inning. Matt Holliday hit what looked to be the game-winning home run in the bottom of the 8th, but closer Ryan Franklin gave up a game-tying home run in that 9th inning, sending the game to extra innings. The Padres scored twice in the 11th to win 5–3. It was a sign of things to come for Franklin in 2011.

That evening, Holliday complained of pains, leading to an emergency appendectomy the next day. After missing only seven games while recuperating from surgery, Holliday returned to the lineup on April 10, singling and drawing two walks in a 6–1 victory over the Giants.

Lance Berkman received the NL Player of the Week award on April 18, batting .417 (10-for-24), leading the majors with six HRs, 12 RBIs, and 1.167 Slugging percentage, and also having two multi-homer games.

Matt Holliday (.408) and Lance Berkman (.393) were 1–3 respectively in the NL batting lead after the first month of the season ended, April 30. Holliday also led the NL in OBP (.511), and Berkman led the NL in both slugging (.753) and OPS (1.207).

The Cardinals recovered from a 2–6 start to finish in first place (16–11) by two games over the Reds at the end of April, and the entire team was also No. 1 in sweeping all three NL hitting percentages at .295/.362/.451, having a .812 OPS and also leading in hits (281), runs (144) total bases (429), and also struck out the fewest times (168). All those base runners led to them also leading in grounding into the most double plays (36), with Albert Pujols (.245/.305/.453, .758 OPS) owning the NL lead with nine.

The Cardinals rose to first place in the standings despite major problems in the bullpen. Ryan Franklin blew four of his first five save opportunities and the Cardinals lost all four of those games. Franklin never got another save opportunity after blowing a save against the Dodgers on April 17, and finished the month with a 10.12 ERA. Mitchell Boggs got the call as closer and recorded three saves before blowing another save (leading to another Cardinals blown-save loss) against Houston on April 26. Left-handed reliever Trever Miller was hit for an .899 OPS by opposition batters in April.

=== May ===
Third baseman David Freese suffered a broken bone in his left hand on May 1 from being hit by a pitch. Freese did not return until the end of June.

The Cardinals continued to search for an effective closer in May. Rookie Eduardo Sanchez filled the role for a while in early May, then Fernando Salas took the job and recorded seven saves in seven chances in the second half of the month.

Jaime García flirted with history on May 6, pitching 7 1/3 innings of perfect baseball against the Milwaukee Brewers at home, bidding for the first perfect game in Cardinals' history, and the first no-hitter since Bud Smith on September 3, 2001. He ended with a 2-hit, complete-game shutout (his 2nd of 2011), after losing his perfect bid with a walk and a hit in the 8th inning. He later gave up a double in the 9th, the only runner to reach second base. He walked one and struck out eight, and a double play in the eighth helped preserve his shutout, the third of his career.

The Cardinals were a strong 17–12 in May and finished the month 2 1/2 games ahead of the Milwaukee Brewers in the NL Central despite numerous injuries to key players. Albert Pujols struggled through a most uncharacteristic slump at the start of the season, going a career-worst 105 at-bats without a home run and finishing May with an unusually low .755 OPS for the first two months. Tony La Russa, suffering from a severe case of shingles, missed six games, with bench coach Joe Pettini serving as acting manager.

=== June ===
Albert Pujols broke out of his season-long slump in style, hitting five home runs in the week that ended June 5 and winning NL Player of the Week honors.

Tony La Russa managed his 5,000th major league game (2,676–2,320–4, 0.536 winning percentage) on June 10, but the milestone was marred by a shutout loss at Milwaukee. He joins Connie Mack as the only manager or coach in American sports history to reach 5,000 games.

On June 19, Albert Pujols hurt his wrist when an opposing player ran into him when Pujols was taking an errant throw from second baseman Peter Kozma. A subsequent MRI on June 20, showed a small fracture in the left wrist-forearm. Pujols estimated time on the DL was expected to be from four to six weeks, and after Wainwright and Pujols both going down and Holliday missing significant time, it became obvious that 2011 was going to be a rough year, maybe even a lost cause. Pujols had played in all 73 games before the injury.

Pujols's injury was 14th time the Cardinals used the disabled list that season for 12 different players, already more than they used all of the previous year. He joined Wainwright, Freese, Nick Punto, Allen Craig, Gerald Laird, Bryan Augenstein and Eduardo Sanchez on the DL.

Left-handed reliever Raúl Valdés was promoted from AAA Memphis on June 23. Valdes became the third lefty in the struggling bullpen, joining struggling southpaws Trever Miller and Brian Tallet in the bullpen. Disabled players David Freese (3b) and Nick Punto (Inf.), both out for over a month, were activated on June 27, providing relief for the injury-riddled team. Freese last played on May 1, and Punto on May 17. Both players made instant impacts in their first game returning when they helped beat the Baltimore Orioles at Camden Yards in their first interleague game there.

Late in June the Cardinals cleared two ineffective relief pitchers from the roster. Miguel Batista, who had given up 27 hits and 19 walks in only 29 innings, was let go on June 22. Former closer Ryan Franklin was given his unconditional release on June 29. He was 1–4 with an 8.46 ERA. Opponents battered him for a .367 average, plus 44 hits and nine home runs over 21 games, in only 27 2/3 innings. He walked 7 and struck out 17, with a 1.84 WHIP Right-handed pitcher Brandon Dickson's contract was called up to fill the roster spot vacated by Franklin's release.

After 81 games on June 29, the half-way point of the season, the team was 43–38 (.531) only 1 game behind the Milwaukee Brewers at 44–37 (.543). The Cardinals played very poorly for much of June, going 3–12 from June 10 to 26. At some time around the end of June, manager Tony La Russa decided to retire at the end of the season. He kept that decision secret from the team.

=== July ===
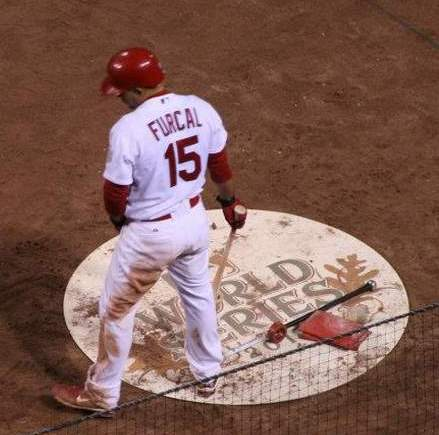
Rafael Furcal, traded to the Cardinals on July 31, awaits his turn at bat in Game 7 of the 2011 World Series

After an initial estimate of Pujols out for 4-to-6 weeks projecting an August 1 return, a reevaluation follow-up from a CT scan on July 1 showed faster recovery than originally thought, raising the possibility of a return by July 15, right after the All-Star break. However, Pujols surprised everyone by recovering very rapidly, and he was activated on July 5, after the minimum 15-days on the DL. Lefty reliever Brian Tallet was placed on the DL to make room for Pujols.

The team made a major trade on July 27, a four-for-four swap, dealing disgruntled Colby Rasmus (hitting only .246), relievers Trever Miller and Brian Tallet, and starter P. J. Walters to the Toronto Blue Jays. In return, the team received right-hand starter Edwin Jackson, left-hand specialist Marc Rzepczynski, right-hand reliever Octavio Dotel, and outfielder Corey Patterson. The team will also receive either three players to be named later, or cash. Jackson was traded earlier the day from the Chicago White Sox to the Blue Jays. Rasmus had previously asked to be traded away from the Cardinals, and at the time of the trade he was mired in a severe slump that saw him hitting .194 since May 12. Jon Jay, who had been getting more playing time as Rasmus struggled, became the everyday center fielder. Kyle McClellan, promoted to the starting rotation to fill the gap caused by the loss of Adam Wainwright, returned to the bullpen.

Pujols got his 2,000th career hit on July 29, at Busch Stadium against the Cubs in the eighth inning with an RBI double. He became the fifth Cardinal to get to 2,000 hits, joining Stan Musial (3,630), Lou Brock (2,713), Rogers Hornsby (2,110), and Enos Slaughter (2,064). He got it in his 1,650th game, the 12th quickest. Musial got his in 1,507 games.

The team made another trade on July 31, just before the non-waiver deadline, acquiring shortstop Rafael Furcal from the Los Angeles Dodgers in return for an AA-outfielder Alex Castellanos. Furcal displaced offseason acquisition Ryan Theriot, who committed 17 errors at shortstop for the Cardinals in 2011.

=== August ===
On August 11 the Cardinals signed free agent lefty specialist pitcher Arthur Rhodes, previously released by the Texas Rangers. The Rhodes acquisition completed a radical in-season makeover of the Cardinal bullpen. The only Cardinal relievers in the bullpen on Opening Day who were still on the team at the end of the season were Mitchell Boggs and Jason Motte. Departures included Miguel Batista and Ryan Franklin (released), Bryan Augenstein (disabled and later sent to the minors) and lefty specialists Trever Miller and Brian Tallet (traded to Toronto in the Rasmus trade). Additions over the course of the season included Rhodes, Marc Rzepcynski and Octavio Dotel (acquired from Toronto in the Rasmus trade), Kyle McClellan (sent back to the bullpen after the Cardinals traded for Edwin Jackson), and Lance Lynn and Fernando Salas (called up from the minor leagues).

At the beginning of the month the Cardinals were 2 1/2 games behind the Brewers in the standings. However, they lost two of three to Milwaukee on the road Aug. 1–3, then did the same at home on Aug. 9–11, giving the Brewers a four-game lead in the NL Central. The team continued to stumble as the Brewers continued to win. Newly acquired shortstop Furcal hit only .240 for the month. The Cardinals went 2–4 on a six-game road trip to Pittsburgh and Chicago, then came home and were swept in three games by a bad Dodger team. After close of business on August 24, the day the Dodgers completed their sweep, St. Louis had fallen ten games behind Milwaukee in the NL Central standings and 10 1/2 games behind the Atlanta Braves (and in third place) in the NL Wild Card standings. Manager Tony La Russa said on the struggles: "I guarantee that the team you have seen the past few weeks is not the team we have, and I believe you will start to see our team tomorrow." Chris Carpenter and other veterans called for a closed, player-only team meeting, which was held the day after the Dodgers series ended. St. Louis' odds of making the playoffs stood at 1.3%. There were rumors, later confirmed by owner Bill DeWitt, that with the Cardinals seemingly out of playoff contention, they had discussed trading Lance Berkman to the Texas Rangers.

The sweep by Los Angeles dropped the Cardinals to 67–63. They ended the month on a positive note, taking three of four from the Pirates and sweeping the Brewers in Milwaukee Aug 30 – September 1, improving their chances of making the playoffs to 4.3%.

=== September: The Comeback Month ===
The Cardinals set a new record of grounding into their 167th (and later, 168th) double-play on September 26, breaking the record set by the 1958 St. Louis Cardinals. They finished the season with 169, five short of the all-time MLB record set by the 1990 Boston Red Sox.

After dropping two of three to the Reds the Cardinals played their last series of the season against Milwaukee September 5–7. St. Louis took two out of three and thus won five of its last six games against the Brewers, but Milwaukee still held a lead of 8 1/2 games. The Cardinals got as close as 4 1/2 games behind the Brewers later in September but Milwaukee played too well to be caught, clinching the Central Division title on September 23.

The same was not true of the wild-card leading Atlanta Braves. 10 1/2 games ahead of the Cardinals on August 24, Atlanta went only 6–7 over its next 13 games before coming to St. Louis on September 9 to play a three-game series that would prove to be critical. In the first game, Atlanta led 3–1 going into the bottom of the ninth inning, but a Schumaker single and walks to Furcal and Theriot set up a two-run, two-out Albert Pujols single to tie the game. The Cardinals won on a sacrifice fly by Nick Punto in the bottom of the 10th. On September 10 St. Louis won by the same 4–3 score when Michael Bourn flied out to right with the tying run on third. On the 11th Yadier Molina hit a three-run double and the Cardinals won 6–3 to complete the sweep. The sweep cut the gap in the wild-card race to 4 1/2 games, but St. Louis had only 16 games left to play and its playoff chances were still only 7.7%.

The Cardinals followed up their sweep of Atlanta by going on the road to Pittsburgh and Philadelphia and taking two of three from the Pirates and three of four from the NL-leading (and eventually 102-game-winner) Phillies. On the 14th Yadier Molina hit a two-run double and the Cardinals beat Pittsburgh 3–2 behind 6.2 strong innings from Edwin Jackson. On the 16th an error by right fielder Corey Patterson allowed the Phillies to tie the game 2–2 in the bottom of the ninth, but the Cardinals scored on RBI hits from rookie Adron Chambers and Tyler Greene in the 11th and hung on to win 4–2. On the 19th the Cardinals escaped with a 4–3 victory over the Phillies when Octavio Dotel got Hunter Pence to ground out in the bottom of the ninth with the tying run on base. The Braves went 3–4 over this same stretch of games, losing to the Marlins on September 19 when Omar Infante hit a game-winning two-run homer in the bottom of the ninth inning. The gap in the wild-card standings had decreased to 2.5 games but with only nine games left the Cardinals' playoff chances were still only 17.7%.

The Cardinals then won two of three at home against the Mets, but suffered a bitterly disappointing loss in the third game of that series, when Rafael Furcal let a ball roll through his legs in the top of the 9th, triggering a six-run Met rally that won the game 8–6. Furcal was so upset by his error that he was talking about retirement before having a personal meeting with LaRussa. The Braves led by two games with six games left and the Cardinals' playoff chances were 24.4%. The Cardinals won two of three against the Cubs, winning 2–1 on September 24 via a bases-loaded walk and wild pitch by Carlos Mármol and recent callup Adron Chambers sprinted home with the winning run. while the Braves lost two of three to the Nationals. Atlanta had a one-game lead with three games left.

The last series of the year for the Cardinals was against the Houston Astros. Atlanta's was against the Philadelphia Phillies. With only a small gap separating the two team's records, the result of this final series would be decisive.

The Cardinals lost to the Astros (who finished the year at 56–106) on September 26th on a walk-off squeeze bunt by Angel Sanchez, but Atlanta also lost to the Phillies, keeping the gap equal. On September 27th, St. Louis overcame a bad start by Jake Westbrook and a 5–0 deficit, scoring five in the fourth and four more in the seventh and winning 13–6. The winning runs came via a two-run triple from Ryan Theriot. Atlanta lost to Philadelphia again, and with one game left in the season the Cardinals and Braves were tied for the wild card.

In the season finale, the Cardinals had little trouble with the Astros, winning 8–0 behind a complete game two-hit shutout from Carpenter. The game ended about 9:25 PM CST. This was the first of two key clinchers Carpenter pitched in late 2011. The Braves started later. With their final regular-season game freshly on the books, Cardinals players and fans anxiously watched the still-ongoing Braves-Phillies match in Atlanta that was now in extra innings. They were two outs away from forcing a tie-breaker game, but a Chase Utley sacrifice fly tied the game 3–3 in the top of the ninth. In the bottom of the 12th, the Braves stranded the winning run on third base. Finally, in the top of the 13th Hunter Pence hit an RBI infield single, and in the bottom of the inning Freddie Freeman of the Braves hit into a double play to lose the ballgame and eliminate Atlanta.

By edging Atlanta to clinch the Wild Card on the final day of the regular season, the 2011 Cardinals completed the largest comeback in history after 130 games, (and collapses in Atlanta's point of view). They went 23–9 over their final 32 games to erase a 10.5 game deficit. They went 18–8 in the month of September while the Braves went 9–18 for September to open the door. Since the Braves play in a different division, the two teams played fewer games against each other, also lowering the odds that the Cardinals had to catch up with the Braves in the Wild Card race. St. Louis finished 90–72 and advanced to the postseason to face the NL East champion Philadelphia Phillies.

B. J. Rains ranked the Cardinals' Top 11 games of 2011, with the winner the September 24, 2–1 ninth-inning comeback win against the Cubs.

== Postseason ==
The team qualified for the Wild Card on the final day of the regular season and played the Philadelphia Phillies for the first time in postseason, in the NL Division Series best of five, starting the first two games at Citizens Bank Park in Philadelphia.

=== NLDS ===
Game 1 of the NLDS ended an 11–6 Philadelphia victory. After Roy Halladay struggled in the first, allowing a three-run homer to Lance Berkman, he settled down, at one point retiring twenty-one Cardinal hitters in a row. After Game 1, Chris Carpenter, starting on three-day's rest for the first time in his career, allowed the Phillies to take a quick 4–0 lead in Game 2. And with Cliff Lee on the mound for the Phils, the game seemed out of reach. "You can count on one finger the number of times you'll come back from four runs down against Cliff Lee", Berkman said. That's exactly what the Cardinals did, and took a 5–4 lead after an RBI single by Albert Pujols. The series was tied at one game apiece. "That win was huge for us", Tony La Russa said. "Realistically, us winning three in a row was not really possible." The famous Rally Squirrel (aka, 'Busch Squirrel'), made his first appearance in Game 3 on October 4, and then again appeared in Game 4 on October 5, running across Home Plate at Busch Stadium in front of Skip Schumaker who was batting. The pitch was called a ball, and Roy Oswalt protested that it should not have counted. Nothing he did changed the umpire's mind though. Schumaker later flew out to left. The team was ahead at the time, 3–2, and held on for the 5–3 victory. The Rally Squirrel was instantly adopted by the fans as the postseason mascot, and thousands of rally squirrel T-shirts were sold. His Twitter account started, and by October 6 it had over 11,000 followers; by October 20, it had over 27,500 followers.

The October 7, Game 5 winner-take-all in the NLDS pitted Cardinals' ace Chris Carpenter vs. Roy Halladay, his best friend off-the-field for the Phillies, at Citizens Bank Park. Carpenter threw an outstanding 3-hit shutout over Halladay and the Phillies to win the NLDS, 1–0. The last out was made by St. Louisan Ryan Howard, who chopped a grounder to Nick Punto at second. Punto saw Howard on the ground by home plate, having torn his achilles. He then lobbed the ball to Albert Pujols, who caught it to send the Cardinals to the NLCS for the first time since 2006.

=== NLCS ===
The NLCS began on Sunday, October 9th at Miller Park with the Milwaukee Brewers taking the first game of the series 9–6. The Cardinals rebounded to take the next two games, with the final score being 12–3 and 4–3, respectively. In Game 2, the Cardinals started the scoring with an Albert Pujols 2-run home run in the first inning and the runs kept coming. The final Cardinal run of the game came from a David Freese solo home run in the 9th inning. The teams split the next two, and on Sunday, October 16, the Cardinals beat the Brewers 12–6 in Game 6 of the National League Championship Series, for their 18th NL Pennant, and became the only team to play in three of the last ten World Series. The final out of the NLCS was recorded when Jason Motte struck out the Brewers' Mark Kotsay on high heat. David Freese was named NLCS MVP. Freese hit a .545 average (12-for-22) during the NLCS, with home runs hit in Game 1, Game 2, and Game 6. Three of the Cardinals' four wins were blowouts in this series; Game 2 was decided by 9 runs and Games 5 & 6 were both decided by 6 runs.

=== World Series ===
Allen Craig was the hero in Game 1 of the World Series, singling off Alexi Ogando to break a 2–2 tie. The Cards managed to win. The next day, Craig was almost the hero again when he singled off Ogando for the second straight night. The Rangers came back to win, 2–1, though, for Jason Motte's only blown save of the postseason. The next game, Albert Pujols went 5-for-6 with three home runs to put him in company with Babe Ruth and Reggie Jackson as the only players to hit three homers in a World Series game. Pujols also set a record with 14 total bases, hits in four consecutive innings, and tied a Series record with five hits, total bases, RBIs, and runs scored in one game.

But after the Rangers won the next two games, the Cardinals fell behind in the Series 3–2. The Cardinals, facing the Texas Rangers in the World Series, pulled-off one of the greatest comeback game wins in World Series history, with an amazing Game 6, winning 10–9 in 11 innings after twice being one strike away from elimination. David Freese hit a two-out, two-strike, ninth-inning triple, to tie the game after trailing 7–5 in the ninth inning. After the Rangers took the lead in the 10th, Berkman delivered with an RBI single at two outs and two strikes in the 10th to tie the game again. Later, with the score tied 9–9, Freese hit a lead-off walk-off home run to dead centerfield in the 11th, off Mark Lowe at 11:39 pm CDT. The win meant that the World Series would go to a seventh game for the first time since 2002. Of the last 13 Major League teams that won Game 6 at home to force a Game 7 in the postseason, 12 went on to win Game 7. The Rangers led 4 different times in the game, including with two outs and two strikes in both the ninth and the 10th, but the Cardinals refused to die.

Freese's game-winning home run was only the fourth in World Series Game 6 history (1975-Bos., 1991-Min., 1993-Tor).

The Cardinals set two records in their Game 6 win: the first team to come back twice from deficits in both the 9th and 10th innings, and the first team to score in the 8th, 9th, 10th, and 11th innings.

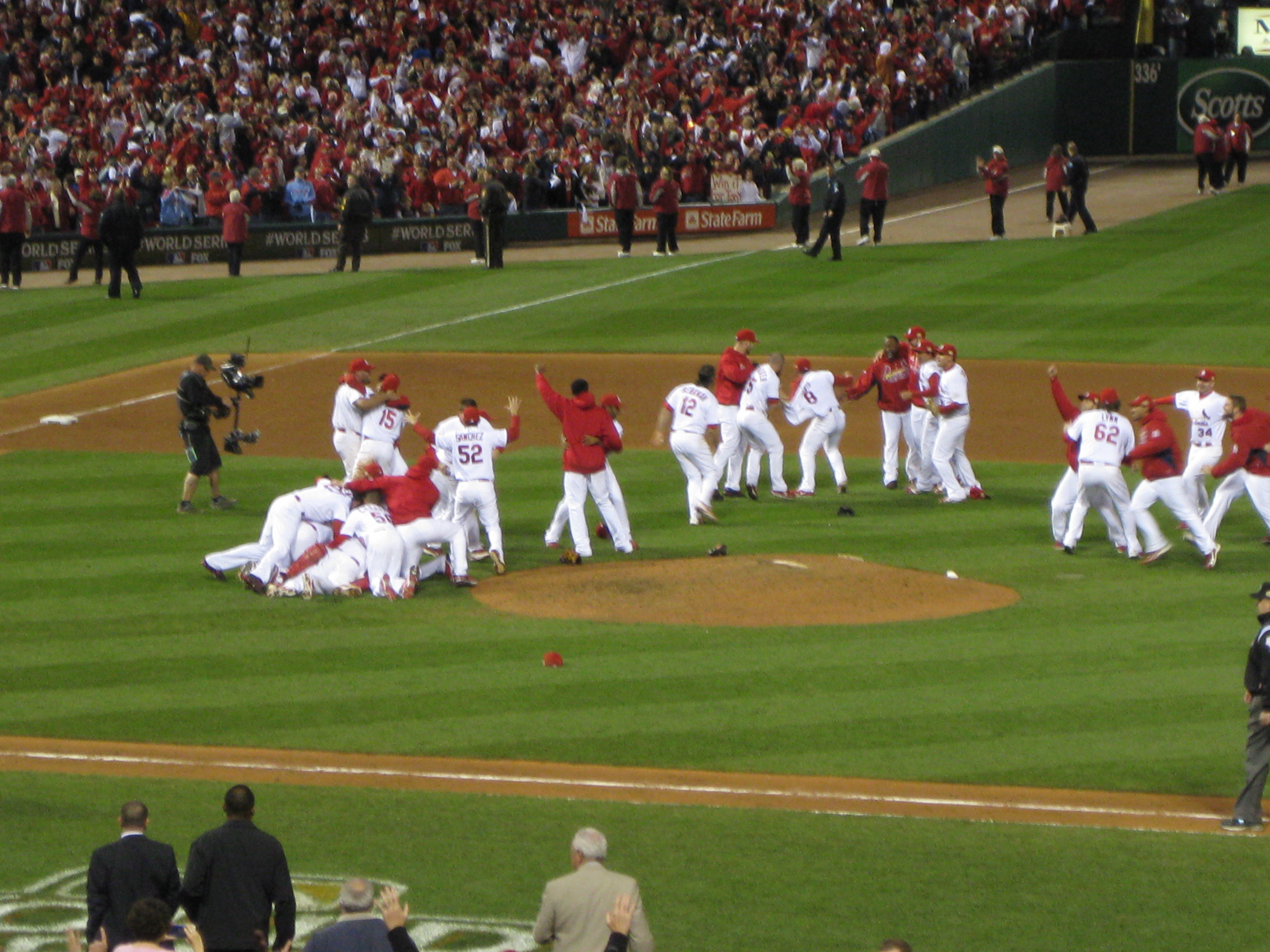
The Cardinals celebrate the 11th World Series Championship in club history, the most of any National League team.

On October 28, the Cardinals finished off their amazing, end-of-season run, starting after the Aug 24 game when they were 10 1/2 games behind for the NL Central Division lead. They defeated the Texas Rangers 4 games to 3, with a 6–2 win in Game 7 of the World Series at their Busch Stadium home in front of 47,399 fans. It was the 36th time a team won the World Series in a Game 7 (or Game 8). The final out was made when David Murphy flew out to left field to give the Cardinals their eleventh world championship. David Freese, a graduate of Lafayette High School in St. Louis, won the MVP award for both the NLCS, and then for the World Series, as well as the Babe Ruth Award. He knocked in a record 21 RBIs in his post-season. Chris Carpenter set a franchise record for most wins (four) in a single postseason. Carpenter, 9–2 overall in his Cardinals postseason career, ran his home postseason mark to 7–0 with a 2.15 ERA. Tony La Russa became only the ninth manager in major-league history to win at least three World Series.

== After the World Series ==
On October 31, three days after winning the World Series, manager Tony La Russa announced his retirement. He finished his managerial career after 33 seasons, third in all-time managerial wins and second all-time in post season wins.

=== November ===
November 3 marked the first time in the playing history of Albert Pujols that he would become a free agent. He officially became a free agent as of 12:01 Eastern.

On November 13, the Cardinals announced former Cardinals' catcher Mike Matheny as their new manager with a news conference on November 14.

Although Dave Duncan did not officially retire, he took an extended leave of absence to tend to his ailing wife and his assistant Derek Lilliquist was nominated as his substitute.

On November 16, MLB announced that La Russa came in third in voting for NL Manager of the Year. Kirk Gibson (of the Arizona Diamondbacks) in his first season won, and Ron Roenicke (of the Milwaukee Brewers) came in second.

Berkman's resurgence led him to a seventh-place MVP finish, and the National League Comeback Player of the Year award.

=== December ===
On December 16, 2011, the Cardinals won the Organization of the Year award from Baseball America for the first time. Baseball America has given this award since 1982.

== Season standings ==
=== Season standings ===
Source: mlb.com MLB Standings

==== National League Central ====
NL Central
Team	W	L	Pct.	GB	Home	Road
Milwaukee Brewers	96	66	.593	—	57‍–‍24	39‍–‍42
St. Louis Cardinals	90	72	.556	6	45‍–‍36	45‍–‍36
Cincinnati Reds	79	83	.488	17	42‍–‍39	37‍–‍44
Pittsburgh Pirates	72	90	.444	24	36‍–‍45	36‍–‍45
Chicago Cubs	71	91	.438	25	39‍–‍42	32‍–‍49
Houston Astros	56	106	.346	40	31‍–‍50	25‍–‍56

==== National League Wild Card ====
Division leaders
Team	W	L	Pct.
Philadelphia Phillies	102	60	.630
Milwaukee Brewers	96	66	.593
Arizona Diamondbacks	94	68	.580

Wild Card team (Top team qualifies for postseason)
Team	W	L	Pct.	GB
St. Louis Cardinals	90	72	.556	—
Atlanta Braves	89	73	.549	1
San Francisco Giants	86	76	.531	4
Los Angeles Dodgers	82	79	.509	7½
Washington Nationals	80	81	.497	9½
Cincinnati Reds	79	83	.488	11
New York Mets	77	85	.475	13
Colorado Rockies	73	89	.451	17
Florida Marlins	72	90	.444	18
Pittsburgh Pirates	72	90	.444	18
Chicago Cubs	71	91	.438	19
San Diego Padres	71	91	.438	19
Houston Astros	56	106	.346	34

=== Record vs. opponents ===
2011 National League record Source: MLB Standings Grid – 2011
Team	AZ	ATL	CHC	CIN	COL	FLA	HOU	LAD	MIL	NYM	PHI	PIT	SD	SF	STL	WSH	AL
Arizona	–	2–3	3–4	4–2	13–5	5–2	6–1	10–8	4–3	3–3	3–3	3–3	11–7	9–9	3–4	5–3	10–8
Atlanta	3–2	–	4–3	3–3	6–2	12–6	5–1	2–5	5–3	9–9	6–12	4–2	4–5	6–1	1–5	9–9	10–5
Chicago	4–3	3–4	–	7–11	2–4	3–3	8–7	3–3	6–10	4–2	2–5	8–8	3–3	5–4	5–10	3–4	5–10
Cincinnati	2–4	3–3	11–7	–	3–4	3–3	9–6	4–2	8–8	2–5	1–7	5–10	4–2	5–2	9–6	4–2	6–12
Colorado	5–13	2–6	4–2	4–3	–	3–3	5–2	9–9	3–6	5–2	1–4	4–3	9–9	5–13	2–4	4–3	8–7
Florida	2–5	6–12	3–3	3–3	3–3	–	6–1	3–3	0–7	9–9	6–12	6–0	0–7	4–2	2–6	11–7	8–10
Houston	1–6	1–5	7–8	6–9	2–5	1–6	–	4–5	3–12	3–3	2–4	7–11	3–5	4–3	5–10	3–3	4–11
Los Angeles	8–10	5–2	3–3	2–4	9–9	3–3	5–4	–	2–4	2–5	1–5	6–2	13–5	9–9	4–3	4–2	6–9
Milwaukee	3–4	3–5	10–6	8–8	6–3	7–0	12–3	4–2	–	4–2	3–4	12–3	3–2	3–3	9–9	3–3	6–9
New York	3–3	9–9	2–4	5–2	2–5	9–9	3–3	5–2	2–4	–	7–11	4–4	4–3	2–4	3–3	8–10	9–9
Philadelphia	3–3	12–6	5–2	7–1	4–1	12–6	4–2	5–1	4–3	11–7	–	4–2	7–1	4–3	3–6	8–10	9–6
Pittsburgh	3–3	2–4	8–8	10–5	3–4	0–6	11–7	2–6	3–12	4–4	2–4	–	2–4	3–3	7–9	4–4	8–7
San Diego	7–11	5–4	3–3	2–4	9–9	7–0	5–3	5–13	2–3	3–4	1–7	4–2	–	6–12	3–3	3–4	6–9
San Francisco	9–9	1–6	4–5	2–5	13–5	2–4	3–4	9–9	3–3	4–2	3–4	3–3	12–6	–	5–2	3–4	10–5
St. Louis	4–3	5–1	10–5	6–9	4–2	6–2	10–5	3–4	9–9	3–3	6–3	9–7	3–3	2–5	–	2–4	8–7
Washington	3–5	9–9	4–3	2–4	3–4	7–11	3–3	2–4	3–3	10–8	10–8	4–4	4–3	4–3	4–2	–	8–7

== Game log ==
The Cardinals, and all 30 teams, had their schedules released by Major League Baseball on September 14, 2010. The Cardinals' opening was at home against the San Diego Padres on March 31.

Regular Season Schedule (calendar style)
Regular Season Schedule (sortable text)

All game times are in Central Time Zone.

Legend
Cardinals WIN	Cardinals LOSS	Game POSTPONED / TIE	Clinched playoff spot

2011 Game Log
March (0–1, .000)

#	Date	Opponent	Score	Win	Loss	Save	Attendance	Record
1	March 31	Padres 3:15 pm (ESPN / (FSM)	5–3 (11)	Neshek (1–0)	Augenstein (0–1)	Bell (1)	46,368	0–1

April (16–10, .615)

#	Date	Opponent	Score	Win	Loss	Save	Attendance	Record
2	April 2	Padres 3:10 pm (Fox)	11–3	Richard (1–0)	Westbrook (0–1)		38,527	0–2
3	April 3	Padres 1:15 pm (FSM)	2–0	García (1–0)	Moseley (0–1)		36,414	1–2
4	April 4	Pirates 7:15 pm (FSM)	4–3	Morton (1–0)	Lohse (0–1)	Hanrahan (3)	32,007	1–3
5	April 5	Pirates 7:15 pm (FSM)	3–2	Batista (1–0)	Olson (0–1)	Franklin (1)	33,666	2–3
6	April 6	Pirates 12:45 pm (FSM)	3–1	Correia (2–0)	Carpenter (0–1)	Hanrahan (4)	34,965	2–4
7	April 8	@ Giants 3:35 pm (FSM)	5–4 (12)	Runzler (1–1)	Tallet (0–1)		42,048	2–5
8	April 9	@ Giants 9:05 pm (FSM)	3–2	Ramírez (1–0)	Franklin (0–1)		41,742	2–6
9	April 10	@ Giants 3:05 pm (FSM)	6–1	Lohse (1–1)	Zito (0–1)		42,092	3–6
10	April 11	@ Diamondbacks 8:40 pm (FSM)	8–2	McClellan (1–0)	Enright (0–1)		15,746	4–6
11	April 12	@ Diamondbacks 8:40 pm (FSM)	13–8	Galarraga (2–0)	Carpenter (0–2)		16,645	4–7
12	April 13	@ Diamondbacks 8:40 pm (FSM)	15–5	Westbrook (1–1)	Kennedy (1–1)		17,660	5–7
13	April 14	@ Dodgers 9:10 pm (FSM)	9–5	García (2–0)	Kuroda (2–1)		34,288	6–7
14	April 15	@ Dodgers 9:10 pm (FSM)	11–2	Lohse (2–1)	Garland (0–1)		36,282	7–7
15	April 16	@ Dodgers 9:10 pm (FSM)	9–2	McClellan (2–0)	Kershaw (2–2)		31,614	8–7
16	April 17	@ Dodgers 3:10 pm (FSM)	2–1	Broxton (1–0)	Franklin (0–2)		27,439	8–8
––	April 19	Nationals 7:15 pm (FSM)	PPD, RAIN; rescheduled for April 20, 1:15 pm					
17	April 20	Nationals 1:15 pm (FSM)	8–6	Lannan (2–1)	Westbrook (1–2)	Storen (2)	32,340	8–9
18	April 20	Nationals 7:15 pm (FSM)	5–3	García (3–0)	Zimmermann (1–3)	Boggs (1)	33,714	9–9
19	April 21	Nationals 12:45 pm (FSM)	5–0	Lohse (3–1)	Gorzelanny (0–2)		36,160	10–9
20	April 22	Reds 7:15 pm (FSM)	4–2	McClellan (3–0)	Maloney (0–1)	Boggs (2)	40,327	11–9
21	April 23	Reds 3:10 pm (Fox)	5–3	Chapman (1–0)	Batista (1–1)	Cordero (3)	41,877	11–10
22	April 24	Reds 7:05 pm (ESPN)	3–0	Westbrook (2–2)	Vólquez (2–1)	Boggs (3)	38,201	12–10
23	April 26	@ Astros 7:05 pm (FSM)	6–5	Lyon (2–1)	Boggs (0–1)		25,526	12–11
24	April 27	@ Astros 7:05 pm (FSM)	6–5	Lohse (4–1)	Happ (1–4)	Sánchez (1)	27,857	13–11
25	April 28	@ Astros 7:05 pm (FSM)	11–7	McClellan (4–0)	Abad (1–2)	Salas (1)	26,331	14–11
26	April 29	@ Braves 6:35 pm (FSM)	5–3 (11)	Sánchez (1–0)	Gearrin (0–1)	Miller (1)	40,279	15–11
27	April 30	@ Braves 12:10 pm (Fox)	3–2	Batista (2–1)	Kimbrel (0–1)	Salas (2)	30,546	16–11

May (17–12, .586)

#	Date	Opponent	Score	Win	Loss	Save	Attendance	Record
28	May 1	@ Braves 12:35 pm (FSM)	6–5	Venters (1–0)	Franklin (0–3)		34,129	16–12
29	May 2	Marlins 7:15 pm (FSM)	6–5	Mujica (3–1)	Boggs (0–2)	Núñez (10)	32,635	16–13
30	May 3	Marlins 7:15 pm (FSM)	7–5	Salas (1–0)	Webb (0–3)	Sánchez (2)	32,689	17–13
31	May 4	Marlins 7:15 pm (FSM)	8–7	Dunn (2–1)	Sánchez (1–1)	Núñez (11)	34,324	17–14
32	May 5	Marlins 12:45 pm (FSM)	6–3	Motte (1–0)	Johnson (3–1)	Sánchez (3)	38,509	18–14
33	May 6	Brewers 7:15 pm (FSM)	6–0	García (4–0)	Wolf (3–3)		35,552	19–14
34	May 7	Brewers 3:10 pm (FSM)	4–0	Gallardo (3–2)	Lohse (4–2)		40,229	19–15
35	May 8	Brewers 1:15 pm (FSM)	3–1	McClellan (5–0)	Narveson (1–3)	Salas (3)	40,125	20–15
36	May 10	@ Cubs 7:05 pm (FSM)	6–4	Carpenter (1–2)	Wood (1–2)	Sánchez (4)	34,249	21–15
37	May 11	@ Cubs 7:05 pm (FSM)	11–4	Garza (2–4)	Westbrook (2–3)		34,439	21–16
38	May 12	@ Cubs 1:20 pm (FSM)	9–1	García (5–0)	Coleman (1–3)		32,559	22–16
39	May 13	@ Reds 6:10 pm (FSM)	6–5 (10)	Cordero (3–1)	Motte (1–1)		32,972	22–17
40	May 14	@ Reds 3:10 pm (FSM)	7–3	Cueto (2–0)	McClellan (5–1)		41,307	22–18
41	May 15	@ Reds 12:10 pm (FSM)	9–7	Wood (3–3)	Carpenter (1–3)	Cordero (7)	24,672	22–19
42	May 16	Phillies 7:15 pm (FSM)	3–1	Westbrook (3–3)	Lee (2–4)	Salas (4)	34,884	23–19
43	May 17	Phillies 7:15 pm (FSM)	2–1	Salas (2–0)	Báez (1–2)		34,567	24–19
44	May 18	Astros 7:15 pm (FSM)	5–1	Lohse (5–2)	Norris (2–3)		35,298	25–19
45	May 19	Astros 12:40 pm (FSM)	4–2	McClellan (6–1)	Happ (3–5)	Salas (5)	36,409	26–19
46	May 20	@ Royals 7:10 pm (FSM)	3–0	Francis (1–5)	Carpenter (1–4)	Soria (7)	26,816	26–20
47	May 21	@ Royals 1:10 pm (FSM)	3–0	Westbrook (4–3)	Collins (2–2)	Salas (6)	32,229	27–20
48	May 22	@ Royals 1:10 pm (FSM)	9–8 (10)	Motte (2–1)	Coleman (0–1)	Salas (7)	28,195	28–20
49	May 23	@ Padres 9:05 pm (FSM)	3–1	Lohse (6–2)	Bell (2–1)	Salas (8)	16,513	29–20
50	May 24	@ Padres 9:05 pm (FSM)	3–2 (11)	Batista (3–1)	Frieri (1–2)	Sánchez (5)	19,426	30–20
51	May 25	@ Padres 5:35 pm (FSM)	3–1	Latos (2–6)	Carpenter (1–5)	Bell (10)	23,088	30–21
52	May 27	@ Rockies 7:40 pm (FSM)	10–3	Westbrook (5–3)	Jiménez (0–5)		31,285	31–21
53	May 28	@ Rockies 6:10 pm (Fox)	15–4	Nicasio (1–0)	García (5–1)		38,149	31–22
54	May 29	@ Rockies 2:10 pm (FSM)	4–3	Lohse (7–2)	Chacin (5–4)	Salas (9)	40,598	32–22
55	May 30	Giants 3:15 pm (FSM)	7–3	Bumgarner (2–6)	McClellan (6–2)		40,849	32–23
56	May 31	Giants 6:09 pm (FSM) / (ESPN)	4–3	Franklin (1–3)	Lopez (2–1)	Salas (10)	37,748	33–23

June (11–15, .423)

#	Date	Opponent	Score	Win	Loss	Save	Attendance	Record
57	June 1	Giants 7:15 pm (FSM)	7–5 (11)	Romo (3–0)	Franklin (1–4)	Wilson (15)	35,775	33–24
58	June 2	Giants 7:15 pm (FSM)	12–7	Sánchez (4–3)	Lynn (0–1)	Affeldt (1)	34,104	33–25
59	June 3	Cubs 7:15 pm (FSM)	6–1	García (6–1)	Dempster (4–5)		40,419	34–25
60	June 4	Cubs 3:10 pm (Fox)	5–4 (12)	Sánchez (2–1)	Samadzija (3–2)		43,195	35–25
61	June 5	Cubs 1:15 pm (FSM)	3–2 (10)	Salas (3–0)	Lopez (0–1)		40,701	36–25
62	June 7	@ Astros 7:05 pm (FSM)	7–4	Westbrook (6–3)	Myers (2–5)	Salas (11)	23,277	37–25
63	June 8	@ Astros 7:05 pm (FSM)	4–1	Norris (4–4)	García (6–2)	Melancon (6)	22,107	37–26
64	June 9	@ Astros 7:05 pm (FSM)	9–2	Lynn (1–1)	Happ (3–8)		24,482	38–26
65	June 10	@ Brewers 7:10 pm (FSM)	8–0	Narveson (3–4)	Lohse (7–3)		32,240	38–27
66	June 11	@ Brewers 6:10 pm (FSM)	5–3	Greinke (6–1)	Carpenter (1–6)	Axford (17)	41,930	38–28
67	June 12	@ Brewers 1:10 pm (FSM)	4–3	Marcum (7–2)	Westbrook (6–4)	Axford (18)	42,692	38–29
68	June 14	@ Nationals 6:05 pm (FSM)	8–6	Rodríguez (2–1)	Batista (3–2)	Storen (16)	26,739	38–30
69	June 15	@ Nationals 6:05 pm (FSM)	10–0	Hernández (4–8)	McClellan (6–3)		27,130	38–31
70	June 16	@ Nationals 6:05 pm (FSM)	7–4 (10)	Burnett (2–3)	Salas (3–1)		19,662	38–32
71	June 17	Royals 7:15 pm (FSM)	5–4	Wood (3–0)	Carpenter (1–7)	Soria (11)	40,674	38–33
72	June 18	Royals 6:15 pm (FSM)	5–4	Motte (3–1)	Holland (1–1)	Salas (12)	43,102	39–33
73	June 19	Royals 1:15 pm (FSM)	5–4	Salas (4–1)	Collins (3–4)		41,660	40–33
74	June 21	Phillies 7:15 pm (FSM)	10–2	Stutes (2–0)	Miller (0–1)		40,095	40–34
75	June 22	Phillies 7:15 pm (FSM)	4–0	Lee (8–5)	Lohse (7–4)		36,520	40–35
76	June 23	Phillies 7:15 pm (FSM)	12–2	Carpenter (2–7)	Oswalt (4–6)		40,532	41–35
77	June 24	Blue Jays 7:15 pm (FSM)	5–4	Frasor (2–1)	Salas (4–2)	Francisco (8)	37,724	41–36
78	June 25	Blue Jays 6:15 pm (FSM)	6–3	Villanueva (5–1)	García (6–3)		40,289	41–37
79	June 26	Blue Jays 1:15 pm (FSM)	5–0	Romero (7–7)	McClellan (6–4)		36,542	41–38
80	June 28	@ Orioles 6:05 pm (FSM)	6–2	Lohse (8–4)	Britton (6–6)		20,556	42–38
81	June 29	@ Orioles 6:05 pm (FSM)	5–1	Carpenter (3–7)	Jakubauskas (2–1)		17,405	43–38
82	June 30	@ Orioles 6:05 pm (FSM)	9–6	García (7–3)	Matusz (1–4)	Salas (13)	28,340	44–38

July (13–13, .500)

#	Date	Opponent	Score	Win	Loss	Save	Attendance	Record
83	July 1	@ Rays 6:10 pm (FSM)	5–3	Westbrook (7–4)	Davis (7–6)	Salas (14)	19,934	45–38
84	July 2	@ Rays 6:10 pm (FSM)	5–1	Niemann (3–4)	McClellan (6–5)		23,897	45–39
85	July 3	@ Rays 12:40 pm (FSM)	8–3	Hellickson (8–7)	Lohse (8–5)	Farnsworth (17)	26,819	45–40
86	July 4	Reds 5:15 pm (FSM)	1–0	Carpenter (4–7)	Cueto (5–3)	Salas (15)	40,551	46–40
87	July 5	Reds 7:15 pm (FSM)	8–1	García (8–3)	Vólquez (5–4)		36,090	47–40
88	July 6	Reds 7:15 pm (FSM)	9–8 (13)	Arredondo (1–3)	Valdés (0–1)	Chapman (1)	37,223	47–41
89	July 7	Diamondbacks 7:15 pm (FSM)	4–1	Saunders (6–7)	McClellan (6–6)	Hernandez (6)	35,274	47–42
90	July 8	Diamondbacks 7:15 pm (FSM)	7–6	Kennedy (9–3)	Lohse (8–6)	Hernandez (7)	37,160	47–43
91	July 9	Diamondbacks 6:15 pm (FSM)	7–6	Salas (5–2)	Paterson (0–3)		42,745	48–43
92	July 10	Diamondbacks 1:15 pm (FSM)	4–2	García (9–3)	Duke (2–4)	Salas (16)	35,299	49–43
–	July 12	82nd All-Star Game	National League 5, American League 1 (Phoenix, Arizona; Chase Field)					
93	July 15	@ Reds 6:10 pm (FSM)	6–5	Ondrusek (4–3)	Salas (5–3)		41,538	49–44
94	July 16	@ Reds 6:10 pm (FSM)	4–1	Carpenter (5–7)	Arroyo (7–8)	Salas (17)	40,204	50–44
95	July 17	@ Reds 12:10 pm (FSM)	3–1	Bailey (4–4)	García (9–4)	Cordero (18)	24,841	50–45
96	July 19	@ Mets 6:10 pm (FSM)	4–2	Gee (9–3)	Lohse (8–7)	Isringhausen (1)	35,448	50–46
97	July 20	@ Mets 6:10 pm (FSM)	6–5 (10)	Isringhausen (2–0)	Salas (5–4)		30,770	50–47
98	July 21	@ Mets 11:10 am (FSM)	6–2	Westbrook (8–4)	Niese (9–8)		37,416	51–47
99	July 22	@ Pirates 6:05 pm (FSM)	6–4	Carpenter (6–7)	Maholm (6–10)	Salas (18)	38,490	52–47
100	July 23	@ Pirates 6:05 pm (FSM)	9–1	García (10–4)	Correia (11–8)		39,102	53–47
101	July 24	@ Pirates 12:35 pm (FSM)	4–3 (10)	Beimel (1–1)	Motte (3–2)		35,402	53–48
102	July 25	Astros 7:15 pm (FSM)	10–5	McClellan (7–6)	Happ (4–12)	Boggs (4)	38,074	54–48
103	July 26	Astros 7:15 pm (FSM)	3–1	Westbrook (9–4)	Myers (3–11)	Salas (19)	35,588	55–48
104	July 27	Astros 7:15 pm (FSM)	4–2	Rodriguez (2–0)	Boggs (0–3)	Melancon (9)	35,679	55–49
105	July 28	Astros 7:15 pm (FSM)	5–3	Rodríguez (7–7)	García (10–5)	Melancon (10)	38,794	55–50
106	July 29	Cubs 7:15 pm (FSM)	9–2	Jackson (8–7)	Garza (4–8)		42,042	56–50
107	July 30	Cubs 3:10 pm (Fox)	13–5	Lohse (9–7)	López (2–3)		43,784	57–50
108	July 31	Cubs 7:05 pm (ESPN)	6–3	Dempster (8–8)	Westbrook (9–5)	Mármol (20)	43,960	57–51

August (15–13, .536)

#	Date	Opponent	Score	Win	Loss	Save	Attendance	Record
109	August 1	@ Brewers 7:10 pm (FSM)	6–2	Greinke (9–4)	Carpenter (6–8)		41,619	57–52
110	August 2	@ Brewers 7:10 pm (FSM)	8–7 (11)	McClellan (8–6)	Estrada (2–7)	Dotel (2)	39,393	58–52
111	August 3	@ Brewers 1:10 pm (FSM)	10–5	Wolf (8–8)	Jackson (8–8)		41,906	58–53
112	August 4	@ Marlins 6:10 pm (FSM)	7–4	McClellan (9–6)	Hensley (1–4)	Salas (20)	20,011	59–53
113	August 5	@ Marlins 6:10 pm (FSM)	3–2	Boggs (1–3)	Sánchez (6–5)	Lynn (1)	19,303	60–53
114	August 6	@ Marlins 6:10 pm (FSM)	2–1	Carpenter (7–8)	Nolasco (8–8)	Salas (21)	23,922	61–53
115	August 7	@ Marlins 12:10 pm (FSM)	8–4	Boggs (2–3)	Dunn (5–6)		20,011	62–53
116	August 9	Brewers 7:15 pm (FSM)	5–3 (10)	Hawkins (1–0)	Dotel (2–2)	Axford (33)	40,626	62–54
117	August 10	Brewers 7:15 pm (FSM)	5–1	Wolf (9–8)	Westbrook (9–6)		38,397	62–55
118	August 11	Brewers 7:15 pm (FSM)	5–2	Carpenter (8–8)	Gallardo (13–8)	Salas (22)	38,302	63–55
119	August 12	Rockies 7:15 pm (FSM)	6–1	Lohse (10–7)	Cook (2–7)		36,181	64–55
120	August 13	Rockies 6:15 pm (FSM)	6–1	Hammel (7–11)	García (10–6)		40,172	64–56
121	August 14	Rockies 7:05 pm (ESPN)	6–2	Jackson (9–8)	Rogers (6–2)		38,748	65–56
122	August 15	@ Pirates 6:05 pm (FSM)	6–2	McDonald (8–6)	Westbrook (9–7)		19,766	65–57
123	August 16	@ Pirates 6:05 pm (FSM)	5–4 (11)	Resop (4–4)	Rhodes (3–4)		20,943	65–58
124	August 17	@ Pirates 6:05 pm (FSM)	7–2	Lohse (11–7)	Maholm (6–14)		22,296	66–58
125	August 19	@ Cubs 1:20 pm (FSM)	5–4 (10)	Marshall (6–5)	Dotel (2–3)		42,343	66–59
126	August 20	@ Cubs 3:10 pm (Fox)	3–0	Garza (6–9)	Jackson (9–9)	Mármol (29)	42,374	66–60
127	August 21	@ Cubs 7:05 pm (ESPN)	6–2	Westbrook (10–7)	López (4–4)		39,420	67–60
128	August 22	Dodgers 7:15 pm (FSM)	2–1	Guerrier (4–3)	Salas (5–5)	Guerra (11)	35,198	67–61
129	August 23	Dodgers 7:15 pm (FSM)	13–2	Kershaw (16–5)	Lohse (11–8)		37,062	67–62
130	August 24	Dodgers 1:15 pm (FSM)	9–4	Kuroda (10–14)	García (10–7)		32,959	67–63
131	August 25	Pirates 7:15 pm (FSM)	8–4	Jackson (10–9)	Morton (9–7)		36,503	68–63
132	August 26	Pirates 7:15 pm (FSM)	5–4	McClellan (10–6)	Veras (2–4)		40,480	69–63
133	August 27	Pirates 3:10 pm (Fox)	7–0	Lincoln (1–0)	Carpenter (8–9)		35,812	69–64
134	August 28	Pirates 1:15 pm (FSM)	7–4	Lohse (12–8)	Karstens (9–8)	Motte (1)	38,429	70–64
135	August 30	@ Brewers 7:10 pm (FSM)	2–1	Jackson (11–9)	Marcum (11–5)	Salas (23)	42,384	71–64
136	August 31	@ Brewers 7:10 pm (FSM)	8–3	Westbrook (11–7)	Wolf (11–9)		38,073	72–64

September (18–8, .692)

#	Date	Opponent	Score	Win	Loss	Save	Attendance	Record
137	September 1	@ Brewers 3:10 pm (FSM)	8–4	Dotel (3–3)	Gallardo (15–9)		34,080	73–64
138	September 2	Reds 7:15 pm (FSM)	11–8	Arredondo (4–4)	Rzepczynski (2–4)		36,970	73–65
139	September 3	Reds 3:10 pm (Fox)	6–4	García (11–7)	Bailey (7–7)	Motte (2)	41,839	74–65
140	September 4	Reds 1:15 pm (FSM)	3–2 (10)	Bray (5–2)	Salas (5–6)	Cordero (30)	41,647	74–66
141	September 5	Brewers 3:15 pm (FSM)	4–1	Wolf (12–9)	Westbrook (11–8)	Axford (41)	42,043	74–67
142	September 6	Brewers 7:15 pm (FSM)	4–2	Lohse (13–8)	Gallardo (15–10)	Motte (3)	35,397	75–67
143	September 7	Brewers 7:15 pm (FSM)	2–0	Carpenter (9–9)	Greinke (14–6)		38,891	76–67
144	September 9	Braves 7:15 pm (FSM)	4–3 (10)	Motte (4–2)	Linebrink (4–3)		37,129	77–67
145	September 10	Braves 6:15 pm (FSM)	4–3	García (12–7)	Lowe (9–14)	Motte (4)	40,689	78–67
146	September 11	Braves 1:15 pm (FSM)	6–3	Westbrook (12–8)	Hudson (14–10)	Motte (5)	39,710	79–67
147	September 12	@ Pirates 6:05 pm (FSM)	6–5	Grilli (2–1)	Rzepczynski (2–5)	Hanrahan (37)	13,278	79–68
148	September 13	@ Pirates 6:05 pm (FSM)	6–4	McClellan (11–6)	Hanrahan (0–4)	Motte (6)	16,544	80–68
149	September 14	@ Pirates 11:35 am (FSM)	3–2	Jackson (12–9)	Morton (9–10)	Motte (7)	12,520	81–68
150	September 16	@ Phillies 6:05 pm (FSM)	4–2 (11)	McClellan (12–6)	Schwimer (1–1)	Salas (24)	45,572	82–68
151	September 17	@ Phillies 6:05 pm (FSM)	9–2	Oswalt (8–9)	Westbrook (12–9)		45,470	82–69
152	September 18	@ Phillies 7:09 pm (ESPN)	5–0	Carpenter (10–9)	Hamels (14–9)		45,063	83–69
153	September 19	@ Phillies 6:05 pm (FSM)	4–3	Lohse (14–8)	Halladay (18–6)	Dotel (3)	45,048	84–69
154	September 20	Mets 7:15 pm (FSM)	11–6	Dotel (4–3)	Stinson (0–2)		37,746	85–69
155	September 21	Mets 7:15 pm (FSM)	6–5	García (13–7)	Herrera (0–1)	Motte (8)	40,658	86–69
156	September 22	Mets 12:45 pm (FSM)	8–6	Acosta (4–1)	Rzepczynski (2–6)	Parnell (6)	35,992	86–70
157	September 23	Cubs 7:15 pm (FSM)	5–1	Samardzija (8–4)	McClellan (12–7)		40,355	86–71
158	September 24	Cubs 12:10 pm (FSM)	2–1	Motte (5–2)	Mármol (2–6)		42,571	87–71
159	September 25	Cubs 1:15 pm (FSM)	3–2	Dotel (5–3)	Wells (7–6)	Motte (9)	41,469	88–71
160	September 26	@ Astros 7:05 pm (FSM)	5–4 (10)	Melancon (8–4)	Dotel (5–4)		20,017	88–72
161	September 27	@ Astros 7:05 pm (FSM)	13–6	Sánchez (3–1)	Del Rosario (0–3)		22,021	89–72
162	September 28	@ Astros 7:05 pm (FSM)	8–0	Carpenter (11–9)	Myers (7–14)		24,358	90–72

=== St. Louis Cardinals vs. Philadelphia Phillies ===
St. Louis Cardinals won the series, 3–2.

Game	Date	Score	Location	Time	Attendance
1	October 1	St. Louis Cardinals – 6, Philadelphia Phillies – 11	Citizens Bank Park	2:55	46,480
2	October 2	St. Louis Cardinals – 5, Philadelphia Phillies – 4	Citizens Bank Park	3:22	46,575
3	October 4	Philadelphia Phillies – 3, St. Louis Cardinals – 2	Busch Stadium	3:13	46,914
4	October 5	Philadelphia Phillies – 3, St. Louis Cardinals – 5	Busch Stadium	2:34	47,071
5	October 7	St. Louis Cardinals – 1, Philadelphia Phillies – 0	Citizens Bank Park	2:29	46,530

=== St. Louis Cardinals vs. Milwaukee Brewers ===
St. Louis Cardinals won the series, 4–2.

Game	Date	Score	Location	Time	Attendance
1	October 9	St. Louis Cardinals – 6, Milwaukee Brewers – 9	Miller Park	3:35	43,613
2	October 10	St. Louis Cardinals – 12, Milwaukee Brewers – 3	Miller Park	3:36	43,937
3	October 12	Milwaukee Brewers – 3, St. Louis Cardinals – 4	Busch Stadium	3:10	43,584
4	October 13	Milwaukee Brewers – 4, St. Louis Cardinals – 2	Busch Stadium	3:25	45,606
5	October 14	Milwaukee Brewers – 1, St. Louis Cardinals – 7	Busch Stadium	3:09	46,904
6	October 16	St. Louis Cardinals – 12, Milwaukee Brewers – 6	Miller Park	3:43	43,926

=== NL St. Louis Cardinals vs. AL Texas Rangers ===
St. Louis Cardinals won the series, 4–3.

Game	Date	Score	Location	Time	Attendance
1	October 19	Texas Rangers – 2, St. Louis Cardinals – 3	Busch Stadium	3:06	46,406 (49 °F (9 °C), clear; 20 mph (32 km/h) – Varies)
2	October 20	Texas Rangers – 2, St. Louis Cardinals – 1	Busch Stadium	3:04	47,288 (50 °F (10 °C), cloudy; 11 mph (18 km/h) – Out to RF)
3	October 22	St. Louis Cardinals – 16, Texas Rangers – 7	Rangers Ballpark in Arlington	4:04	51,462 (80 °F (27 °C), partly cloudy; no wind)
4	October 23	St. Louis Cardinals – 0,Texas Rangers – 4	Rangers Ballpark in Arlington	3:07	51,539 (68 °F (20 °C), clear; 1 mph (1.6 km/h) – varies)
5	October 24	St. Louis Cardinals – 2, Texas Rangers – 4	Rangers Ballpark in Arlington	3:31	51,459 (72 °F (22 °C), clear; 2 mph (3.2 km/h) – In from CF)
6	October 27	Texas Rangers – 9, St. Louis Cardinals – 10 (11 inn.)	Busch Stadium	4:33	47,325 (53 °F (12 °C), partly cloudy; 7 mph (11 km/h) – L to R)
7	October 28	Texas Rangers – 2, St. Louis Cardinals – 6	Busch Stadium	3:17	47,399 (50 °F (10 °C), clear; 6 mph (9.7 km/h) – R to L)

==== Composite line score ====
2011 World Series (4–3): St. Louis Cardinals (N.L.) over Texas Rangers (A.L.)

Team	1	2	3	4	5	6	7	8	9	10	11	R	H	E
St. Louis Cardinals	5	2	1	7	5	6	4	2	3	2	1	38	56	6
Texas Rangers	4	1	1	4	6	4	4	2	2	2	0	30	60	8
Total attendance: 342,878 Average attendance: 48,983; Notes: Winning player's share: $323,169.98 Losing player's share: $251,515.76

==== Ratings ====
The overall average national Nielsen rating for the seven games was 10.0, with Fox's 14.7 rating for Game 7 being the network's highest for a World Series telecast since Game 4 of the 2004 World Series.

Game 6 on Oct 27, averaged 21.1 million viewers with a 12.7 rating and a 21 share. Through six games, the 2011 World Series on FOX is averaging a 9.3/15 in household rating/share, with 15.3 million viewers, +11% in rating over last year (8.4/14, 14.3 million) and 2008 (8.4/14, 13.6 million). Both were five-game series. The current 9.3/15 average for the 2011 World Series would rank as the sixth highest-rated show (live+same day) in primetime, a ranking that was likely to improve with the inclusion of a rare Game 7. Game 6 opened with an 8.5 at 8:00 PM EDT and grew steadily throughout the night averaging 11.7 from 9:00–9:30 PM EDT; 12.9 from 10:00–10:30 PM EDT; and 13.2 from 11:00–11–30 PM EDT. The broadcast peaked with a 15.0 HH rating and 25.2 million viewers from midnight-12:30 AM EDT.

From 8:00 to 11:00 PM EDT, Game 6 averaged an 11.8 HH rating, with 19.4 million viewers. From 11:00 PM EDT to its conclusion, the game averaged a 14.3 HH rating, with 23.9 million viewers, +21% in rating and +23% in viewership compared to Primetime. Post mid-night, the game averaged a 14.8 rating and 24.9 million viewers, +25% in rating and +28% in average audience.

St. Louis led all local markets for Game 6 with a 49.4/70, peaking at a 57.0/75 from 10:30–11:00 PM EDT, with the final quarter-hour averaging a 53.1/82. Dallas averaged a World Series-high 47.1/67, while peaking at 55.7/81 from 11:15–11:30 PM EDT.

Game	Ratings (households)	Share (households)	American audience (in millions)
1	8.7	14	14.2
2	8.9	14	14.3
3	6.6	12	11.2
4	9.2	14	15.2
5	8.8	14	14.3
6	12.7	21	21.1
7	14.7	25	25.4

== Opening Day lineup ==
3	Ryan Theriot	SS
28	Colby Rasmus	CF
5	Albert Pujols	1B
7	Matt Holliday	LF
12	Lance Berkman	RF
23	David Freese	3B
4	Yadier Molina	C
55	Skip Schumaker	2B
29	Chris Carpenter	P

== Players ==
=== Roster ===
2011 St. Louis Cardinals
Roster
Pitchers: 22 Bryan Augenstein; 44 Miguel Batista; 41 Mitchell Boggs; 29 Chris Carpenter; 63 Maikel Cleto; 65 Brandon Dickson; 28 Octavio Dotel; 31 Ryan Franklin; 54 Jaime García; 22 Edwin Jackson; 26 Kyle Lohse; 62 Lance Lynn; 46 Kyle McClellan; 43 Trever Miller; 30 Jason Motte; 53 Arthur Rhodes; 34 Marc Rzepczynski; 59 Fernando Salas; 52 Eduardo Sánchez; 56 Brian Tallet; 37 Raúl Valdés; 40 P. J. Walters; 35 Jake Westbrook	Catchers: 48 Tony Cruz; 13 Gerald Laird; 4 Yadier Molina; Infielders: 19 Matt Carpenter; 33 Daniel Descalso; 23 David Freese; 15 Rafael Furcal; 27 Tyler Greene; 38 Mark Hamilton; 47 Pete Kozma; 5 Albert Pujols; 8 Nick Punto; 55 Skip Schumaker; 3 Ryan Theriot	Outfielders: 12 Lance Berkman; 64 Andrew Brown; 56 Adron Chambers; 21 Allen Craig; 7 Matt Holliday; 15,19 Jon Jay; 44 Corey Patterson; 28 Colby Rasmus; 43 Shane Robinson	Manager: 10 Tony La Russa; Coaches: 18 Dave Duncan (pitching); 36 Derek Lilliquist (bullpen); 25 Mark McGwire (hitting); 39 Dave McKay (first base); 11 José Oquendo (third base); 49 Joe Pettini (bench)

== Player stats ==
=Team leader

=== Batting ===
Cardinals batters struck out on 978 occasions in 2011, making them the only National League team in the 2010s to strike out fewer than 1,000 times in a season.

Note: G=Games played; AB=At bats; R=Runs; H=Hits; 2B=Doubles; HR=Home runs; RBI=Runs batted in; BB=Walks; SO=Strikeouts; GIDP=Grounded into double play; Avg.=Batting average; OBP=On-base percentage; SLG=Slugging percentage

(through September 28, FINAL)

Cardinals HITTING statistics
TEAM HITTING statistics

Player	G	AB	R	H	2B	HR	RBI	BB	SO	GIDP	Avg.	OBP	SLG
Albert Pujols	147	579	105	173	29	37	99	61	58	29	.299	.366	.541
Lance Berkman	145	488	90	147	23	31	94	92	93	7	.301	.412	.547
Matt Holliday (9/27)	124	446	83	132	36	22	75	60	93	21	.296	.388	.525
Ryan Theriot (leadoff −7/31)	132	442	46	120	26	1	47	29	41	15	.271	.321	.342
Yadier Molina	139	475	55	145	32	14	65	33	44	21	.305	.349	.465
Jon Jay	159	455	56	135	24	10	37	28	81	11	.297	.344	.424
Skip Schumaker	117	367	34	104	19	2	38	27	50	10	.283	.333	.351
David Freese	97	333	41	99	16	10	55	24	75	18	.297	.350	.441
Daniel Descalso	148	326	35	86	20	1	28	33	65	3	.264	.334	.353
Allen Craig	75	200	33	63	15	11	40	15	40	7	.315	.362	.555
Rafael Furcal	50	196	29	50	11	7	16	17	18	3	.255	.316	.418
Nick Punto	63	133	21	37	8	1	20	25	21	3	.278	.388	.421
Tyler Greene	58	104	22	22	5	1	11	13	31	3	.212	.322	.288
Gerald Laird	37	95	11	22	7	1	12	9	19	3	.232	.302	.358
Chris Carpenter (P)	32	71	2	11	3	0	5	2	25	0	.155	.178	.197
Tony Cruz	38	65	8	17	5	0	6	6	13	1	.262	.333	.338
Kyle Lohse (P)	33	63	3	11	2	0	3	1	17	0	.175	.188	.206
Jaime García (P)	30	62	3	6	0	1	6	1	18	1	.097	.111	.145
Corey Patterson	44	51	5	8	4	0	3	2	12	1	.157	.189	.235
Mark Hamilton	38	47	5	10	3	0	4	4	16	1	.213	.275	.277
Jake Westbrook (P)	33	47	2	5	2	1	8	3	23	0	.106	.160	.213
Kyle McClellan (P)	43	35	3	5	1	0	4	1	12	1	.143	.167	.171
Edwin Jackson (P)	13	26	2	8	0	0	2	1	8	0	.308	.321	.308
Andrew Brown *	11	22	1	4	1	0	3	0	8	1	.182	.182	.227
Pete Kozma *	16	17	2	3	1	0	1	4	4	0	.176	.333	.235
Matt Carpenter *	7	15	0	1	1	0	0	4	4	0	.067	.283	.133
Adron Chambers	18	8	2	3	0	0	4	0	1	0	.375	.375	.625
Shane Robinson	9	7	0	0	0	0	0	1	2	1	.000	.125	.000
Colby Rasmus ( -7/26) ^	94	338	61	83	14	11	40	45	77	8	.246	.332	.420
Pitcher Totals	162	323	17	49	8	2	28	10	112	2	.152	.177	.195
TEAM TOTALS	162	5,532 (#7)	762 (#1)	1,513 (#1)	308 (#3)	162 (#6)	726 (#1)	542 (#3)	978 (#16)	169 (#1)	.273 (#1)	.341 (#1)	.425 (#1)

* Currently not on active roster
† Suspended, on 15-day disabled or rehab list
^ Traded away from Cardinals

BOLD=Leading NL / #1=Leading 16 NL teams

=== Starting pitchers ===
=Team leader

Note: GS=Games started; IP=Innings pitched; W=Wins; L=Losses; ERA=Earned run average; WHIP=(Walks + Hits) per innings pitched; HBP=Hit by pitch; BF=Batters faced; O-AVG=Opponent batting average.; O-SLG=Opponent slugging average.; R support avg=Average runs support from his team per games started

(through September 28, FINAL)

Cardinals PITCHING statistics

Sortable TEAM PITCHING Statistics

Player	GS	IP	W	L	ERA	H	HR	BB	SO	WHIP	HBP	BF	O-AVG	O-SLG	R support avg
Chris Carpenter (2 ShO)	34	237.1	11	9	3.45	243	16	55	191	1.26	6	996	.264	.360	4.0
Jake Westbrook	33	183.1	12	9	4.66	208	16	73	104	1.53	2	809	.289	.433	5.1
Jaime García (2 ShO)	32	194.2	13	7	3.56	207	15	50	156	1.32	2	826	.273	.394	5.1
Kyle Lohse (1 ShO)	30	188.1	14	8	3.39	178	16	42	111	1.17	3	775	.249	.390	4.6
Kyle McClellan ( -7/25)	17	110.2	6	6	4.15	111	14	33	55	1.30	2	470	.259	.413	4.3
Edwin Jackson (7/29- )	12	77.0	5	2	3.62	89	7	23	51	1.45	2	334	.299	.460	4.7
Lance Lynn (6/9) ††	2	10.1	1	1	5.23	10	1	3	8	1.26	1	42	.263	.368	8.0
Brandon Dickson (9/1)	1	3.1	0	0	8.11	6	2	1	3	2.10	0	16	.400	.867	8.0
Miguel Batista (4/22) *	1	0.0	0	0	0.00	0	0	1	0	–	0	1	.000	.000	4.0
STARTER TOTALS	162	1,005.0	62	42	3.81	1,052	87	281	679	1.33	18	4,269	.270	.401	4.7

* not on active roster
† on 15-day disabled list
†† on 60-day disabled list

Bold=leading NL

=== Relief pitchers ===
Note: IP=Innings pitched; ERA=Earned run average; WHIP=(Walks + Hits) per Innings pitched

"Bullpen Briefs" (through Sep 28, no relievers needed that day)

28–30, 3.61 ERA, 463.1 IP, 416 H, 210 R, 186 ER, 49 HR 170 BB, 421 SO, 1.26 WHIP
Saves/Opp: 47/73 (64.4%) 1st Batter / Retired: 329/462 (71.2%)
Holds: 84

Inherited Runners/Scored: 68/231 (29.4%)

(through Sep 26, last loss)

Games lost by bullpen: 30 Salas (6), Franklin (4), Dotel (3), Rzepczynski (3), Boggs (3), Motte (2), Batista (2), Tallet (1), Augenstein (1), Sánchez (1), Miller (1), Valdés (1), Rhodes (1), McClellan (1)

Blown Saves by bullpen: 24 Salas (6), Motte (4), Franklin (4), Boggs (3), Miller (2), Sánchez (2), McClellan (1), Batista (1), Rzepczynski (1)

== Scoring by inning ==
(through September 28, FINAL)

INNING	1	2	3	4	5	6	7	8	9	10	11	12	13	TOTAL
CARDINALS	103	82	82	82	88	95	83	82	54	4	6	1	0	762
OPPONENTS	74	56	98	80	78	87	63	75	62	12	5	1	1	692

== Cardinals record when ==
(through September 28, FINAL)

Home 45–36 (.556)
Away 45–36 (.556)

Scoring first 64–36
Opp. scores first 26–36

Scoring more than 3 runs 70–29
Scoring 3 runs 13–14
Scoring fewer than 3 runs 7–29

Leading after 7 innings 68–9
Tied after 7 innings 12–14
Trailing after 7 innings 10–49

Leading after 8 innings 77–7
Tied after 8 innings 9–13
Trailing after 8 innings 4–52

In errorless games 55–27
In error-made games 35–45
Extra innings 8–13
Shutouts 9–8

One-run games 26–23

Out-hit opponents 58–15
Same hits as opponents 14–4
Out-hit by opponents 18–53

Runs via HR 262 (34.4% of total)
Opp. Runs via HR 229 (33.1% of total)

By Day

Mon. 6–9
Tue. 16–8
Wed. 11–15
Thu. 14–6
Fri. 14–11
Sat. 13–13
Sun. 16–10

By Opponent
DIVISION
HOME ROAD TOTAL

NL Central 25–15 19–20 44–35
NL East 12–6 10–7 22–13
NL West 6–11 10–6 16–17
AL East 0–3 4–2 4–5
AL Central 2–1 2–1 4–2

TOTALS 45–36 45–36 90–72
(Interleague 8–7)

== Busch Stadium (Indexes, 2011) ==
(through September 28, 90–72)

2011 (100=Neutral Park, > 100 Ballpark favors, < 100 Ballpark inhibits)
81 HOME G; Cardinals: 2,646 AB; Opponents: 2,801 AB
81 AWAY G: Cardinals: 2,886 AB; Opponents: 2,807 AB

162 G Cardinals: 5,532 AB; Opponents: 5,608 AB

BA 92 R 90 H 88 2B 85 3B 66 HR 81 BB 106 SO 97 E 89 E-inf. 83 LHB-BA 94 LHB-HR 93 RHB-BA 91 RHB-HR 74

BA .273 (HOME .270 ROAD .277)

(Opponents BA: at StL .242 at their Home .279)

2009–2011 Index (3-yr. composite)

HOME 243 G; Cardinals: 7,986 AB; Opponents: 8,371 AB)

BA 96 R 92 H 94 2B 92 3B 76 HR 77 BB 107 SO 98 E 104 E-inf. 103 LHB-BA 97 LHB-HR 86 RHB-BA 95 RHB-HR 73

BA-Home .268 BA-Road .265
Opp.-Busch .247 Opp.-at their HOME .270

== Farm system ==
Level	Team	League	Manager
AAA	Memphis Redbirds	Pacific Coast League	Chris Maloney
AA	Springfield Cardinals	Texas League	Ron Warner
A	Palm Beach Cardinals	Florida State League	Luis Aguayo
A	Quad Cities River Bandits	Midwest League	Johnny Rodríguez
A-Short Season	Batavia Muckdogs	New York–Penn League	Dann Bilardello
Rookie	Johnson City Cardinals	Appalachian League	Mike Shildt
Rookie	GCL Cardinals	Gulf Coast League	Steve Turco

LEAGUE CHAMPIONS: Quad Cities, Johnson City

=== Draft selections ===
St. Louis Cardinals 2011 Draft Selections

== See also ==
- Rally Squirrel
