= Fernando Salas (baseball) =

Mexican baseball player (born 1985)

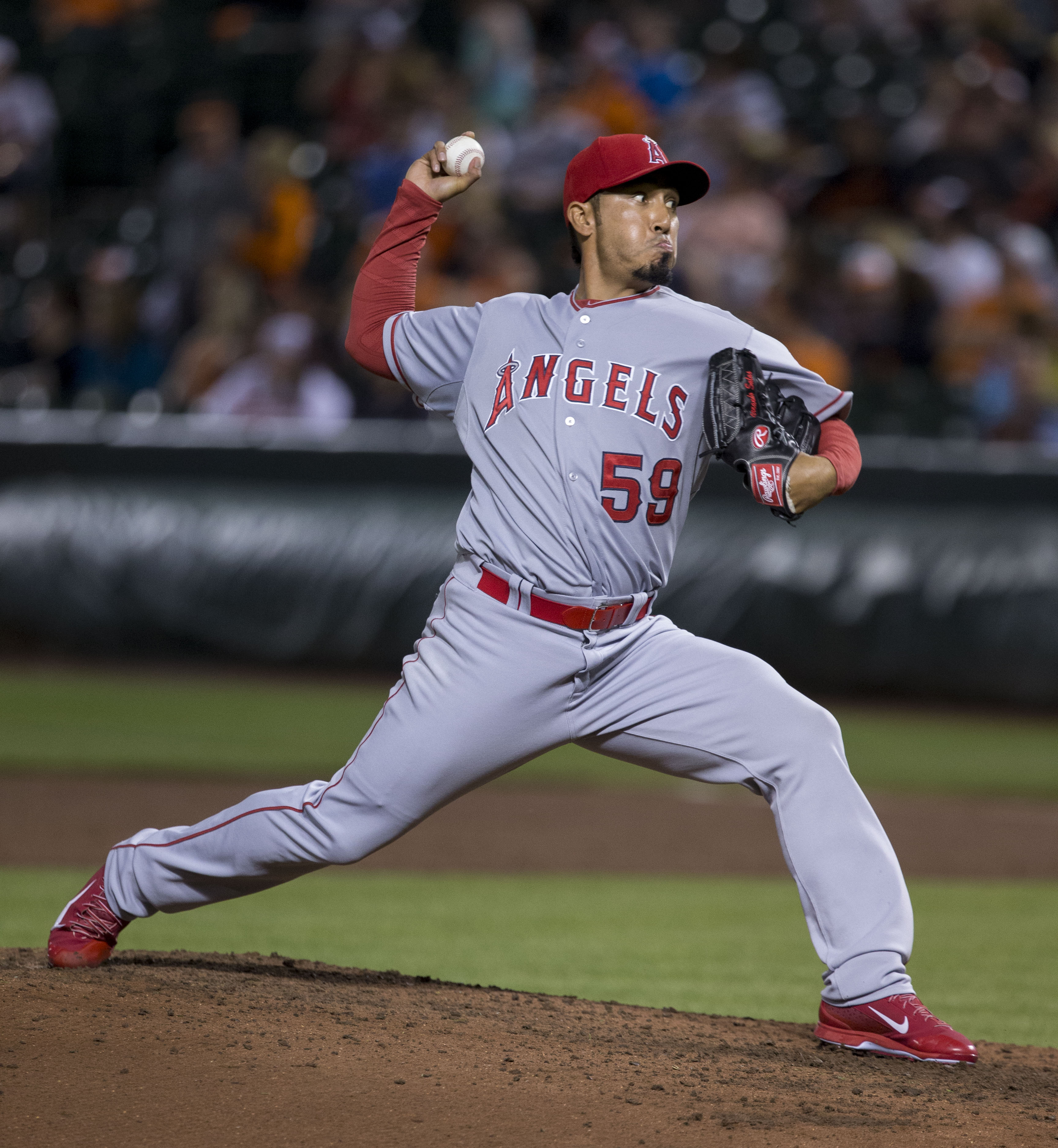
- Salas in his first stint with the Angels

Olmecas de Tabasco – No. 59
- Pitcher
- Born: May 30, 1985 (age 40); Huatabampo, Sonora, Mexico
- Bats: Right Throws: Right

MLB debut
- May 28, 2010, for the St. Louis Cardinals

MLB statistics (through 2019 season)
- Win–loss record: 25–28
- Earned run average: 3.91
- Strikeouts: 474
- Stats at Baseball Reference

Teams
- St. Louis Cardinals (2010–2013); Los Angeles Angels of Anaheim / Los Angeles Angels (2014–2016); New York Mets (2016–2017); Los Angeles Angels (2017); Arizona Diamondbacks (2018); Philadelphia Phillies (2019)

Career highlights and awards
- World Series champion (2011)
Medals
Men's baseball
Representing Mexico
WBSC Premier12
Bronze medal – third place	2019 Tokyo	National team

Noel Fernando Salas Buitimea (born May 30, 1985) is a Mexican professional baseball pitcher for the Olmecas de Tabasco of the Mexican League. He has previously played in Major League Baseball (MLB) for the St. Louis Cardinals, Los Angeles Angels of Anaheim, New York Mets, Arizona Diamondbacks, and Philadelphia Phillies. He made his MLB debut with the Cardinals in 2010.

== Early life ==
Fernando Salas was born and raised in Huatabampo, Mexico. Growing up he never thought about playing in the American Major Leagues, instead being a fan of Mexican League baseball. Said Salas: "There is a lot of money to stay in Mexican League. A lot of players in Mexican League have a chance, (at American baseball) but they want a lot of money." Although he watched little if any American baseball—the only game he can remember watching is the 1993 World Series between the Toronto Blue Jays and Philadelphia Phillies—he had a dream of proving he was good enough to play in the major leagues.

== Professional career ==
=== Saraperos de Saltillo ===
Salas first pitched professionally at age 20 when he was signed by the Saraperos de Saltillo of the Mexican League. There his pitching coach was Sid Monge a veteran of ten years in American Major League baseball as a player and a coach in the St. Louis Cardinals minor league system. According to Salas, Monge was the reason he is now playing in the major leagues: "He pushed me. He said 'You can go to America'. He believed in me." Representatives from other major league teams took interest in Salas as well, with scouts from the Chicago Cubs, Kansas City Royals, Detroit Tigers and the Cardinals watching Salas pitch in the 2006 Mexican League playoffs.

=== St. Louis Cardinals ===
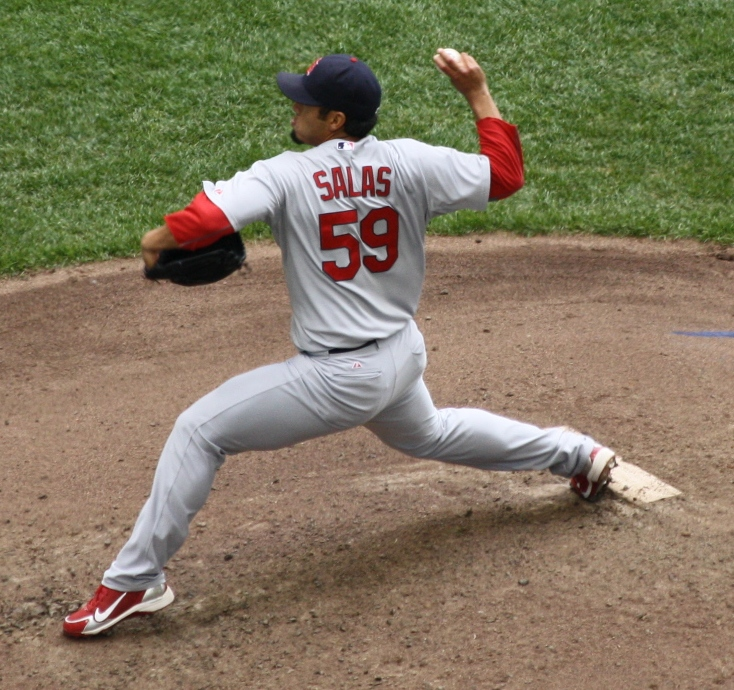
Salas pitching for the St. Louis Cardinals in 2011

The Cardinals were impressed enough to buy Salas' contract from Saltillo in February 2007. He reported for spring training in Jupiter, Florida, remaining there for the entire season with the Cardinals High-A ball affiliate Palm Beach Cardinals. He advanced through the minor league system, playing for the Double-A Springfield Cardinals in 2008 and Triple-A Memphis Redbirds for the 2009 season. Salas began 2010 in Memphis but was called up to the majors for the first time on May 27, 2010. He made his major league debut the next day, pitching one scoreless inning.

In 2011, he replaced Ryan Franklin as the Cardinals' closer, earning 24 saves in 68 appearances with a 2.28 ERA. Salas began the 2012 season with St. Louis, but after going 0–3 with a 6.32 ERA in 18 games, he was optioned to Triple-A Memphis. It was later learned that Salas had been hampered by a kidney stone, and once that medical situation passed he returned to St. Louis later in the season. He finished the 2012 season with a record of 1–4, 60 strikeouts, and a 4.30 ERA.

=== Los Angeles Angels of Anaheim / Los Angeles Angels ===
On November 22, 2013, he was traded along with David Freese to the Los Angeles Angels of Anaheim for Peter Bourjos and Randal Grichuk.

=== New York Mets ===
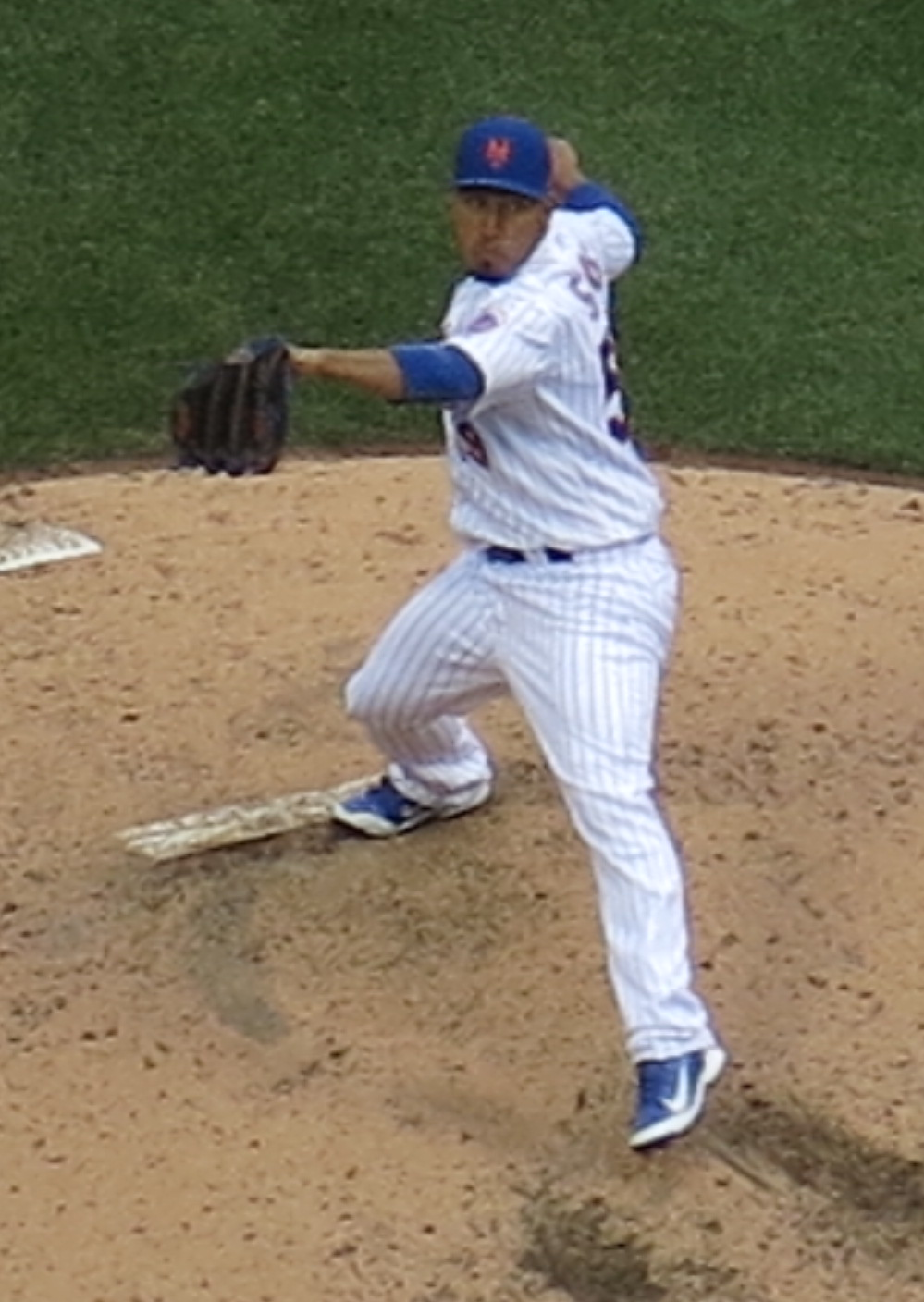
Salas with the Mets in 2017

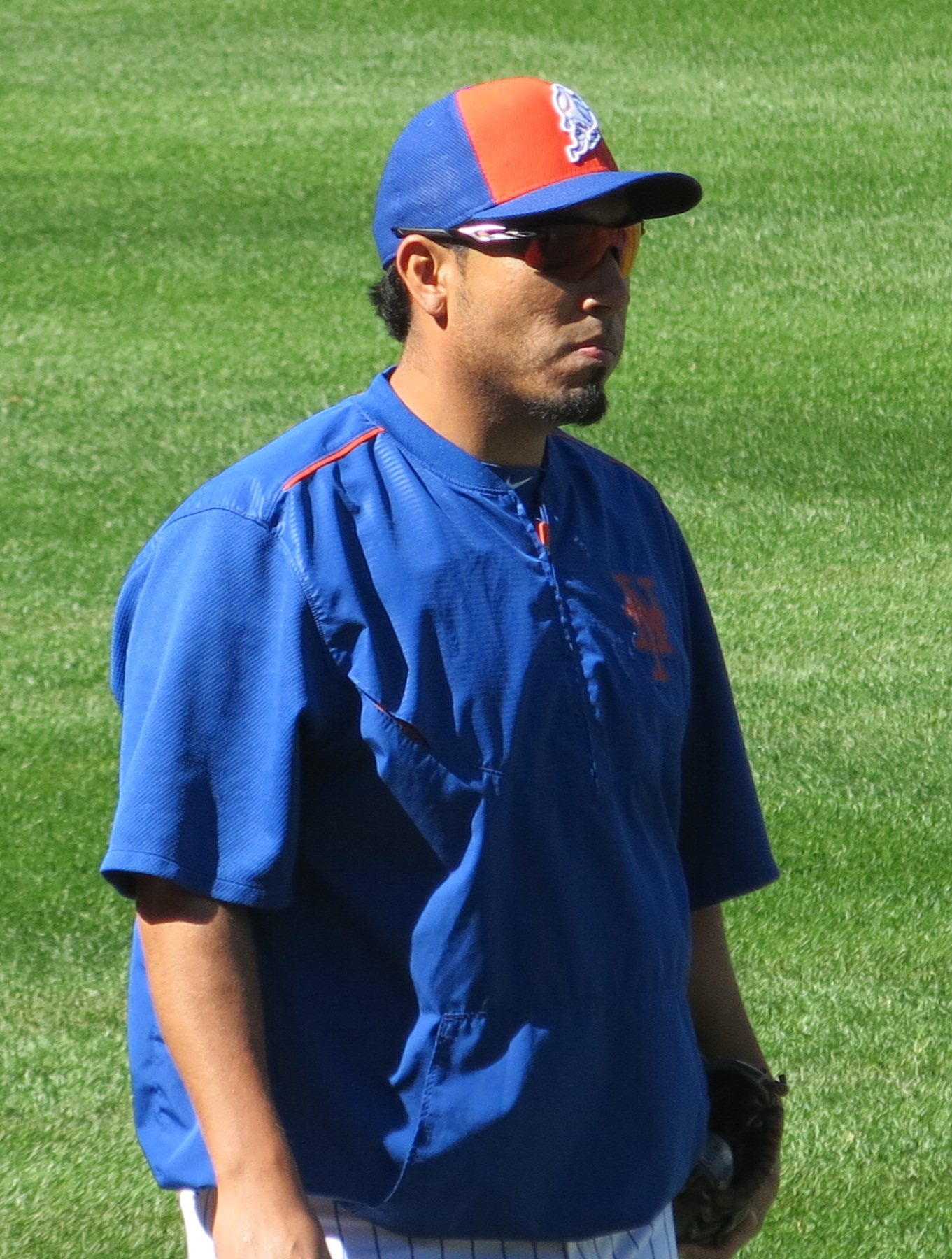
Salas with the Mets in 2016

On August 31, the Angels traded Salas to the New York Mets for minor league pitcher Erik Manoah. He debuted for the club on September 1, pitching a scoreless inning against the Miami Marlins at Citi Field. On February 15, 2017, Salas signed a one-year contract with the Mets. On his thirty-second birthday, Salas recorded his first Major League hit off of Carlos Torres of the Milwaukee Brewers at Citi Field. He was designated for assignment on August 11, 2017. He was released by the Mets on August 16, 2017.

=== Los Angeles Angels (second stint) ===
On August 19, 2017, Salas signed a minor league contract with the Los Angeles Angels.

=== Arizona Diamondbacks ===
On January 22, 2018, Salas signed a minor league deal with the Arizona Diamondbacks. In 44 games for Arizona, he was 4–4 with a 4.50 ERA in 40 innings. On July 6, 2018, Salas was designated for assignment. He was released on July 9, 2018.

=== Atlanta Braves ===
On July 16, 2018, Salas signed a minor league contract with the Atlanta Braves. In 6 games for the Triple–A Gwinnett Stripers, he struggled to a 12.00 ERA with 9 strikeouts over 6 innings of work. Salas was released by the Braves organization on August 11.

=== Acereros de Monclova ===
On March 6, 2019, Salas signed with the Acereros de Monclova of the Mexican League. In 27 appearances for Monclova, he recorded a 4.08 ERA with 30 strikeouts across 28 2/3 innings pitched.

=== Philadelphia Phillies ===
On June 7, 2019, Salas signed a minor league deal with the Philadelphia Phillies and was assigned to the Lehigh Valley IronPigs. On June 24, his contract was selected by the Phillies. He was designated for assignment on June 28 after appearing in just one game. Salas had his contract selected by the Phillies on July 18. He was once again designated for assignment on July 21, after the signing of Drew Smyly, and outrighted on July 23. In 2019 with the Triple–A Lehigh Valley IronPigs he was 1–1 with a 4.63 ERA in 18 relief appearances (23 1/3 innings), and with the Phillies he pitched 2 2/3 innings in which he gave up two runs. He elected free agency on October 1. After the 2019 season, he played for Naranjeros de Hermosillo of the Mexican Pacific League.

On February 28, 2020, Salas signed with the Acereros de Monclova of the Mexican League. He did not play in a game in 2020 due to the cancellation of the Mexican League season because of the COVID-19 pandemic.

=== Olmecas de Tabasco ===
On March 30, 2021, Salas was traded to the Olmecas de Tabasco of the Mexican League. In his first year with Tabasco, he logged an 0.42 ERA with 23 strikeouts and 12 saves across 21 appearances.

Salas pitched in 33 games in his second season for the Olmecas in 2022, posting a 2–3 record and 4.80 ERA with 32 strikeouts and 20 saves across 30 innings of relief. He made 29 appearances for Tabasco in 2023 his third season with the team, recording a 1.47 ERA with 33 strikeouts and 20 saves over 30 2/3 innings pitched.

Salas made 33 appearances out of the bullpen in 2024 his fourth season with the team, compiling a 1.36 ERA with 33 strikeouts and a league–leading 28 saves across 33 innings of work.

In 2025, Salas returned to Tabasco for a fifth season. In 35 games 36 innings of relief he went 2-4 with a 4.50 ERA with 32 strikeouts and 17 saves.

== Personal life ==
Salas and his wife, Daniela, are parents of a son, Fernando, born during 2012 spring training. He is being raised in Mexico. It is not a situation to Salas' liking: "Other Latin players have a lot of family in America. For me, it didn't happen. It's a little difficult because my family doesn't know any English. But they know it's work. They know it's a profession." and "I love the opportunity. I want to do everything I can to stay here."

== Awards and honors ==
- 2006 Mexican League mid-season All-Star
- 2008 Texas League mid-season Al-Star
- 2008 Futures Game selection
- 2008 Texas League post-season All-Star
- 2008 Baseball America Double-A All-Star
- 2010 PCL Pitcher of the Week
- 2010 PCL mid-season All-Star
- 2010 MLB.com Organization All-Star
- 2011 World Series champion
- 2023 Mexican League Reliever of the Year Award
- 2024 Mexican League Reliever of the Year Award
