= Eduardo Sánchez (baseball) =

Venezuelan baseball player (born 1989)

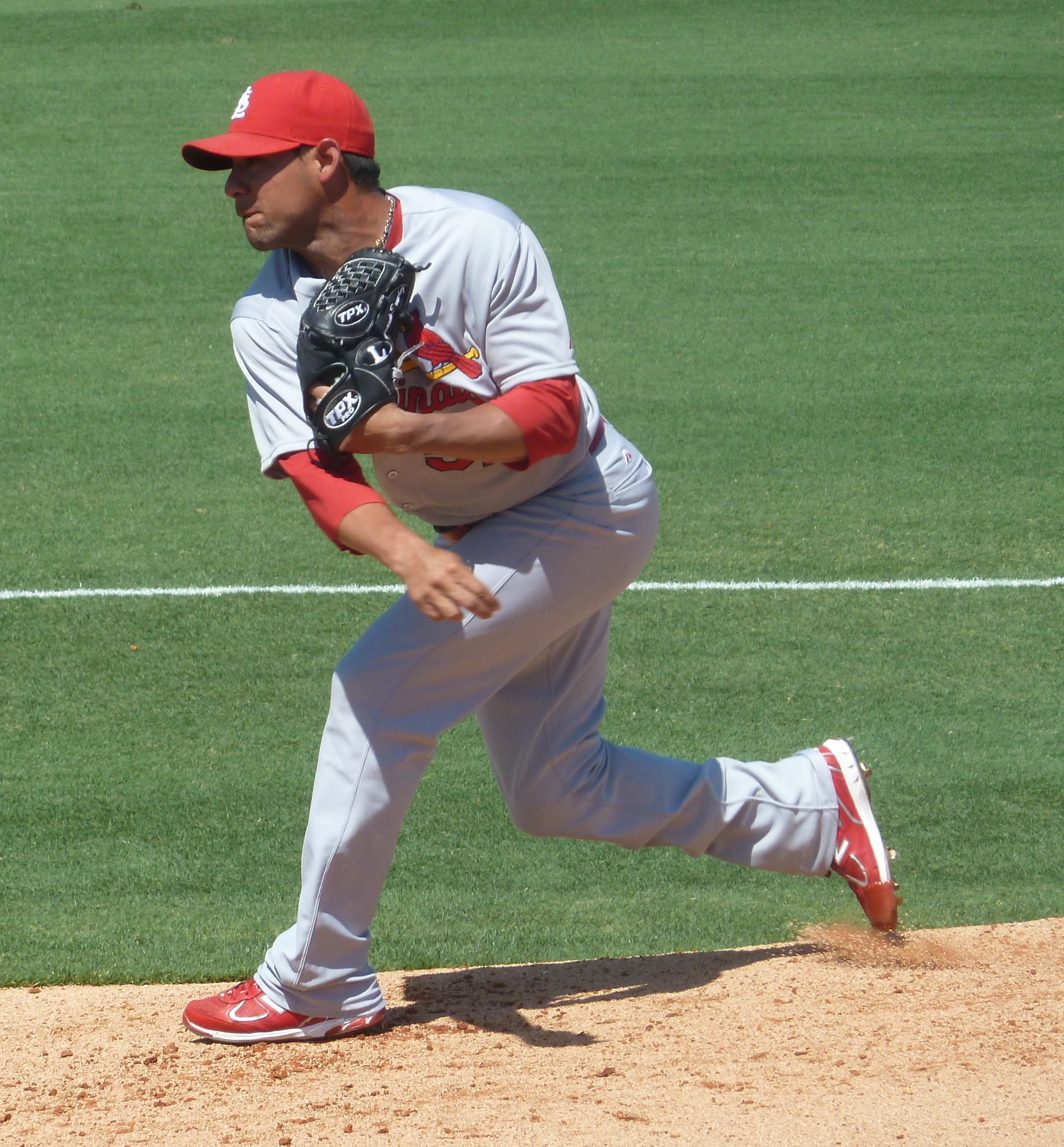
- Sánchez with the St. Louis Cardinals
- Pitcher
- Born: February 16, 1989 (age 37); Maracay, Venezuela
- Batted: Right Threw: Right

MLB debut
- April 13, 2011, for the St. Louis Cardinals

Last MLB appearance
- August 13, 2013, for the Chicago Cubs

MLB statistics
- Win–loss record: 3–3
- Earned run average: 3.68
- Strikeouts: 53
- Stats at Baseball Reference

Teams
- St. Louis Cardinals (2011–2012); Chicago Cubs (2013)

Eduardo Nazareth Sánchez (born February 16, 1989) is a Venezuelan former professional baseball pitcher. He was signed by the St. Louis Cardinals as a non-drafted free agent on December 26, 2005 and played for the Cardinals and Chicago Cubs in Major League Baseball (MLB).

Sánchez throws a fastball/slider combination that can go as fast as 94-mph to 97-mph.

== Professional career ==
=== St. Louis Cardinals ===
Sánchez began his professional career with the VSL Cardinals in 2006. He earned his first win on July 29 against the VSL Tigers/Marlins, allowing one run on five hits and a walk with three strikeouts in five innings pitched. Sánchez finished the season with a record of 1-2 with 38 strikeouts and an 8.71 ERA in 19 games, two starts.

In 2007 Sánchez split the season between the Rookie-Level GCL Cardinals and Johnson City Cardinals. He held opponents scoreless in six of his seven outings with GCL Cardinals and notched his first career save on June 21 against the GCL Marlins. He was promoted to Johnson City of the Appalachian League on July 20 and earned a save in his first appearance. Sánchez picked up his first win of the season after striking out both batters he faced on August 2. He finished the season a combined 2-2 with 29 strikeouts and a 1.27 ERA in 21 1/3 innings pitched.

With the Class-A Quad Cities River Bandits in 2008, Sánchez went 5-1 with 55 strikeouts and a 2.86 ERA in 24 games, five starts. He held Midwest League hitters to just a .209 average.

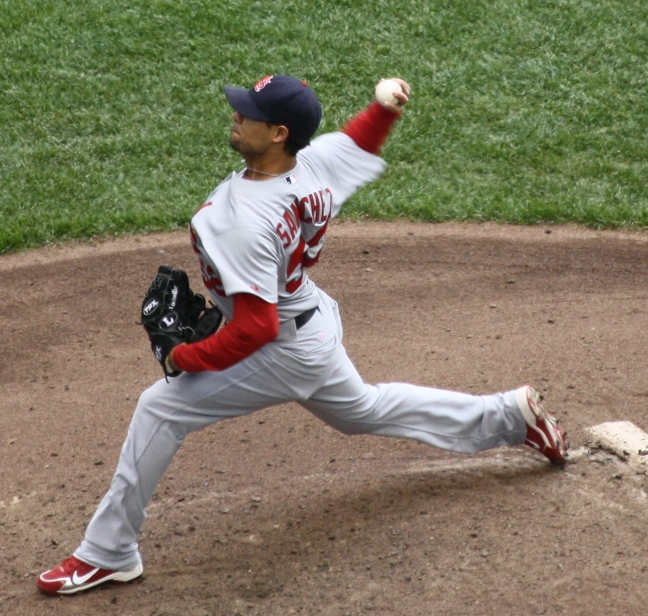
Pitching for the Cardinals in 2011

In 2009 Sánchez split the season between the Class-A Advanced Palm Beach Cardinals and the Double-A Springfield Cardinals. He began the season with Palm Beach where he went 0-1 with 26 strikeouts and a 1.44 ERA in 19 games. He was promoted to Springfield and went 2-0 with 56 strikeouts, 10 saves and a 2.70 ERA. Sánchez went a combined 2-1 with 82 strikeouts, 13 saves with a 2.28 ERA in 75 innings pitched. At the end of the season Sánchez was named the Cardinals' Minor League Reliever of the Year by Scout.com. He was also named a "Top Prospect" in the Cardinals' organization by MLB.com.

He made his major league debut against the Arizona Diamondbacks at Chase Field in the 8th-9th innings on April 13, 2011, getting a groundout and two strikeouts in the 8th, giving up a double, but striking out the side in the 9th for five strikeouts in a mop-up role in the 15-5 victory.

On April 27, 2011 he got his first career save at Minute Maid Park against the Houston Astros. He gave up two earned runs but ended up completing the save striking out two in one inning of work.

In the beginning of 2013 Season, Sánchez was optioned to the Triple-A Memphis Redbirds.

=== Chicago Cubs ===
On May 21, 2013, Sánchez was claimed off waivers by the Chicago Cubs. The Cubs designated him for assignment on September 1. Sánchez cleared waivers and was sent outright to the Triple-A Iowa Cubs on September 4. He later became a free agent.
