= Brandon Dickson =

American baseball player (born 1984)

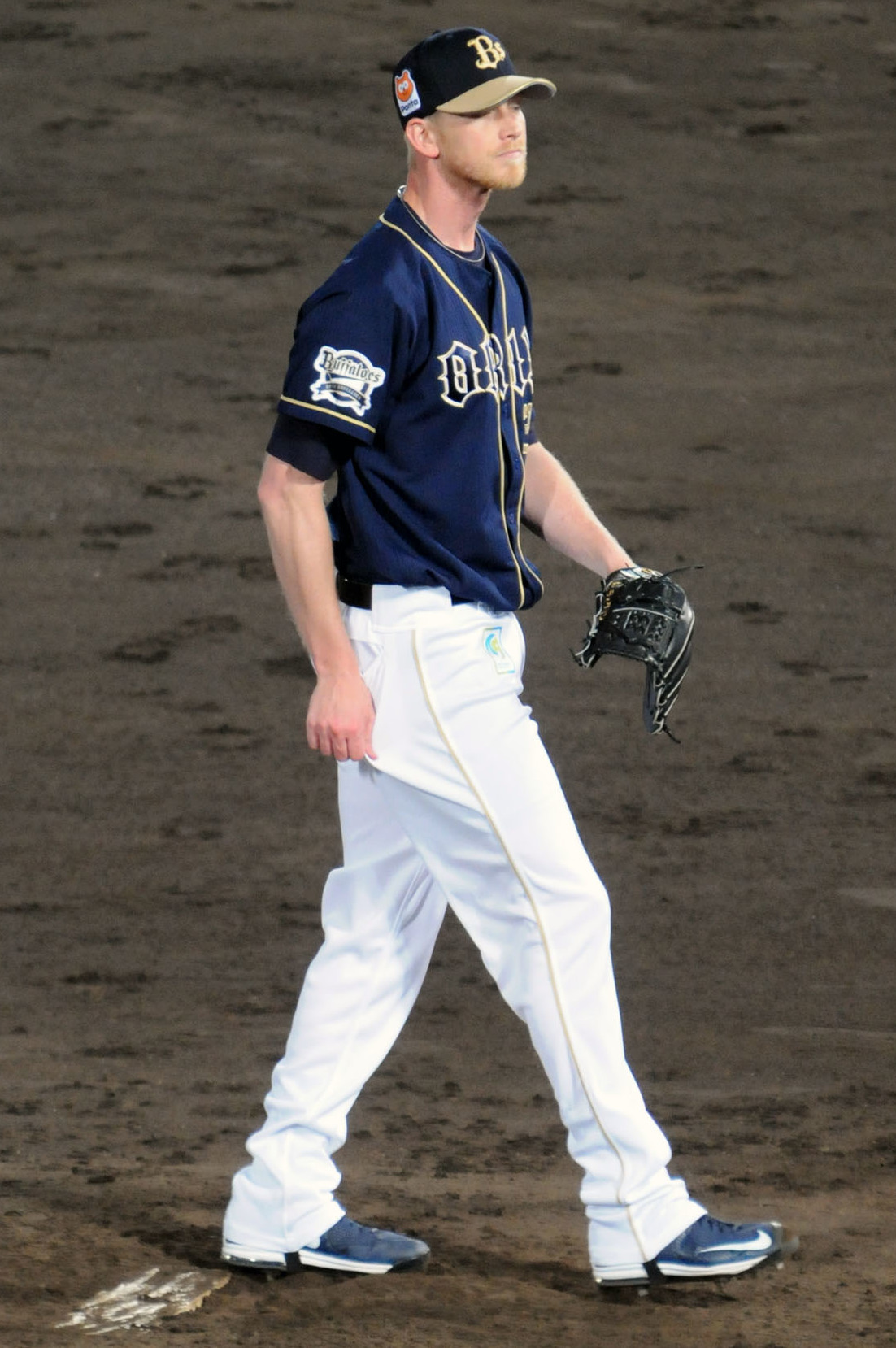
- Dickson with the Orix Buffaloes
- Pitcher
- Born: November 3, 1984 (age 41); Montgomery, Alabama, U.S.
- Batted: Right Threw: Right

Professional debut
- MLB: July 2, 2011, for the St. Louis Cardinals
- NPB: March 31, 2013, for the Orix Buffaloes

Last appearance
- MLB: September 3, 2021, for the St. Louis Cardinals
- NPB: October 28, 2020, for the Orix Buffaloes

MLB statistics
- Win–loss record: 0–0
- Earned run average: 5.94
- Strikeouts: 14

NPB statistics
- Win–loss record: 49–58
- Earned run average: 3.32
- Strikeouts: 673
- Stats at Baseball Reference

Teams
- St. Louis Cardinals (2011–2012); Orix Buffaloes (2013–2020); St. Louis Cardinals (2021)

Career highlights and awards
- WBSC Premier12 All-World Team (2019)
Medals
Men's baseball
Representing United States
Olympic Games
Silver medal – second place	2020 Tokyo	Team

Brandon Lee Dickson (born November 3, 1984) is an American former professional baseball pitcher. He played in Major League Baseball (MLB) for the St. Louis Cardinals and in Nippon Professional Baseball (NPB) for the Orix Buffaloes.

== Career ==
=== St. Louis Cardinals ===
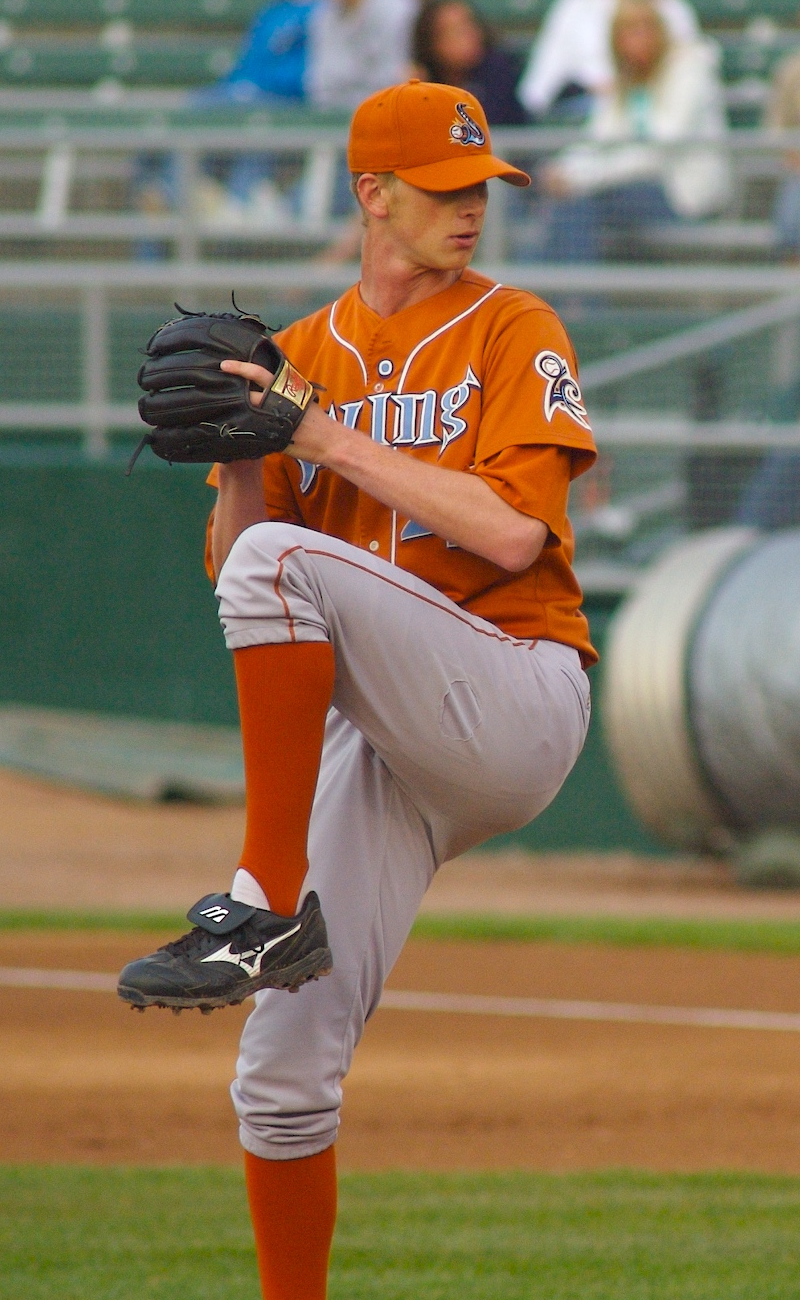
Dickson pitching for the Swing of the Quad Cities in 2007

Dickson was signed as an undrafted free agent by the St. Louis Cardinals in 2006, after attending Tusculum College. In 2006, playing for the New Market Rebels in the Valley Baseball League, Dickson had a league-leading and franchise record 13 saves, and led the league in wins, going 5–0 in 26 relief appearances. He made his professional debut with the Johnson City Cardinals.

In 2007, with Single-A Quad Cities, Dickson's statline included an 11–7 win–loss record, with one save, and a 3.50 earned run average (ERA), in 31 games pitched (23 as a starting pitcher), covering 144 innings. He split the 2008 season between the High-A Palm Beach Cardinals and the Double-A Springfield Cardinals, posting a 10–10 record and 4.17 ERA in 29 appearances. In 2009, with Springfield, Dickson was 8–10, with a 3.78 ERA, 28 games (20 starts), in 147 2/3 innings. In 2010, Dickson pitched for the Triple-A Memphis Redbirds, and went 11–8 with a 3.23 ERA, in 28 games (27 starts), covering 167 innings. In 2011, Dickson was invited to his first major league spring training, but did not make the big league club; he was assigned to Triple-A Memphis to begin the season.

Dickson's contract was purchased by the Cardinals from Memphis on June 30, 2011, to fill the roster spot created by Ryan Franklin's release the previous day, and he was promoted to the major leagues for the first time. Dickson made his major league debut on July 2, against the Tampa Bay Rays, pitching a perfect 1 2/3 innings in relief. In his rookie season, Dickson posted a 3.24 ERA with seven strikeouts in four games (one start). He spent the majority of the 2012 season in Memphis, but appeared in 4 major league game for the Cardinals, logging a 7.11 ERA with 6 strikeouts in 6 1/3 innings of work. Dickson was released by the Cardinals organization on November 19, 2012.

=== Orix Buffaloes ===
On December 27, 2012, Dickson signed with the Orix Buffaloes of Nippon Professional Baseball (NPB). For the 2013 season, Dickson pitched to an 8–8 record and 2.77 ERA in 23 appearances. The next year, Dickson logged a 9–10 record and 3.33 ERA in 26 games for Orix. In 2015, Dickson pitched in 20 games for the Buffaloes, posting a 9–9 record and 2.48 ERA with 88 strikeouts in 130 2/3 innings pitched.

On September 27, 2015, Dickson signed a one-year extension to remain with the Buffaloes. For the 2016 season, Dickson recorded a 9–11 record and 4.36 ERA with 139 strikeouts in 171 1/3 innings of work. In 2017, he pitched to a 8–9 record and 3.24 ERA in 25 games. On September 5, 2017, Dickson signed a one-year extension to remain with the Buffaloes. For the 2018 season, Dickson registered a 4–6 record and 3.55 ERA with 84 strikeouts in 99.0 innings pitched. In 2019, Dickson pitched to a 2–1 record with a 3.03 ERA and 18 saves in 37 appearances out of the bullpen.

With the conclusion of the 2019 season — Dickson's seventh year with the NPB Buffaloes — he had an overall record of 49–55, with 18 saves, and a 3.26 ERA. In 882 2/3 innings pitched, Dickson recorded 661 strikeouts. On December 20, 2019, Dickson signed a one-year extension to remain with the Buffaloes. In 2020 with Orix, Dickson logged a 0–4 record and 3.28 ERA with 16 saves in 39 appearances.

For the 2021 season, Dickson was unlikely to make it to Japan, as the Japanese government was not issuing new visas and his family could not accompany him. On May 20, 2021, the Buffaloes released Dickson.

=== St. Louis Cardinals (second stint) ===
On June 14, 2021, Dickson signed a minor league contract with the St. Louis Cardinals organization and was assigned to the Triple-A Memphis Redbirds. Dickson made 11 appearances for Memphis, going 1–0 with a 9.58 ERA and five strikeouts. On September 1, 2021, Dickson's contract was selected by the Cardinals. On September 6, Dickson was designated for assignment after posting a 13.50 ERA across 2 appearances. Dickson was outrighted to Triple-A Memphis two days later. On September 18, the Cardinals released Dickson.

== International career ==
On October 10, 2019, Dickson was selected to play with the United States national baseball team at the 2019 WBSC Premier12. He tied for the tournament lead in the tournament with Japan national baseball team’s Yasuaki Yamasaki, with three saves, and was named the best reliever in the tournament.

In May 2021, Dickson was named to the roster of the national team for qualifying for baseball at the 2020 Summer Olympics. After the team qualified, he was named to the Olympics roster on July 2. The team went on to win silver, falling to Japan in the gold-medal game.

== Awards and honors ==
- 2007 Midwest League (A) Mid-Season All-Star
- 2010 Pacific Coast League (AAA) Mid-Season All-Star
