= Kyle McClellan =

American baseball player (born 1984)

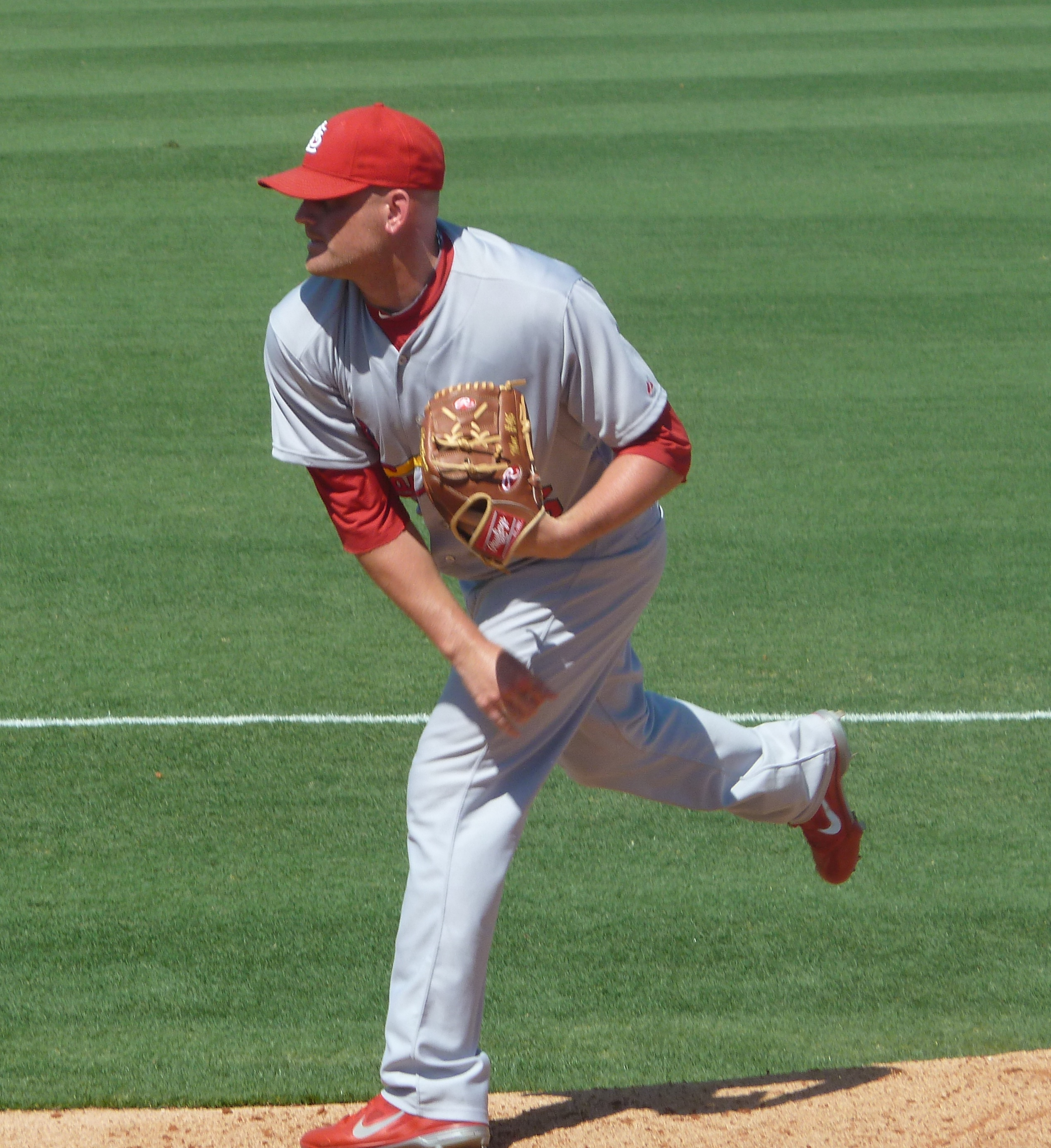
- McClellan with the St. Louis Cardinals
- Pitcher
- Born: June 12, 1984 (age 42); Florissant, Missouri, U.S.
- Batted: Right Threw: Right

MLB debut
- April 1, 2008, for the St. Louis Cardinals

Last MLB appearance
- June 29, 2013, for the Texas Rangers

MLB statistics
- Win–loss record: 19–24
- Earned run average: 3.79
- Strikeouts: 260
- Stats at Baseball Reference

Teams
- St. Louis Cardinals (2008–2012); Texas Rangers (2013)

Kyle William McClellan (born June 12, 1984) is an American former professional baseball pitcher. McClellan was drafted by the St. Louis Cardinals in the 25th round of the 2002 Major League Baseball draft. He also played for the Texas Rangers.

== Early life ==
Kyle McClellan was born in Florissant, Missouri and grew up in the St. Louis metro area. He graduated from suburban Hazelwood West High School in 2002. While there he was a three-sport athlete, lettering in football, basketball, and baseball. McClellan was a two-time All-State selection at both pitcher and first base. McClellan's older brother Matt served as his high school pitching coach.

== Career ==
McClellan signed with the Cardinals after being drafted by the club in 2002 and made his professional debut with St. Louis' rookie franchise in Johnson City. He started out as a relief pitcher but in 2003 and 2004 pitched exclusively as a starting pitcher. In 2005, McClellan made appearances out of the bullpen again until being sidelined by a torn ligament in his right elbow on July 1. McClellan underwent Tommy John surgery on July 22, 2005. After recovery and rehab from the procedure he returned to pitching in 2006 and continued to advance through the Cardinals Single-A and Double-A farm teams, returning to full-time relief pitching.

In 2008, after a strong spring training, McClellan made the Cardinals' major league roster. McClellan is only the second player from St. Louis' 2002 draft to make the big leagues. He was the major league leader in holds through August with 29 and finished the season tied for second in the majors with 30.

In 2011, McClellan earned a spot in the starting rotation after Adam Wainwright was forced to miss the entire season for Tommy John surgery. He made several starts until July, when the Cardinals acquired Edwin Jackson. Sent to the bullpen, McClellan made eleven relief appearances in the month of August, allowing only one run. Pitching more innings than any other reliever in baseball that month took a toll, however. By September, arm fatigue set in and he was left off the Cardinals' divisional playoff and World Series roster.

McClellan suffered another career setback with the Cardinals in July 2012. While recovering from elbow strain, he was attempting a throwing session at Busch Stadium when he experienced pain in the right shoulder. Exploratory surgery indicated a frayed labrum and a split in the right shoulder capsule, both requiring months of rehab following surgical repair. The injury left McClellan's future as a Cardinal in doubt. On November 13, 2012, McClellan was given his unconditional release by the Cardinals.

On January 15, 2013, McClellan signed a minor league deal (with invitation to spring training) with the Texas Rangers. He played for the Rangers' Triple A affiliate Round Rock Express and Double-A affiliate Frisco RoughRiders, before his contract was purchased by the Rangers on June 9, and he was brought up to the major leagues. McClellan made what would prove to be his final major league appearance on June 29, 2013, and was designated for assignment on July 2, 2013.

== Personal life ==
McClellan and his wife, Bridget, make their home in Maryland Heights, Missouri. They are the parents of a daughter, born one week after Mother's Day in 2011, and a son.
