= Adron Chambers =

American baseball player (born 1986)

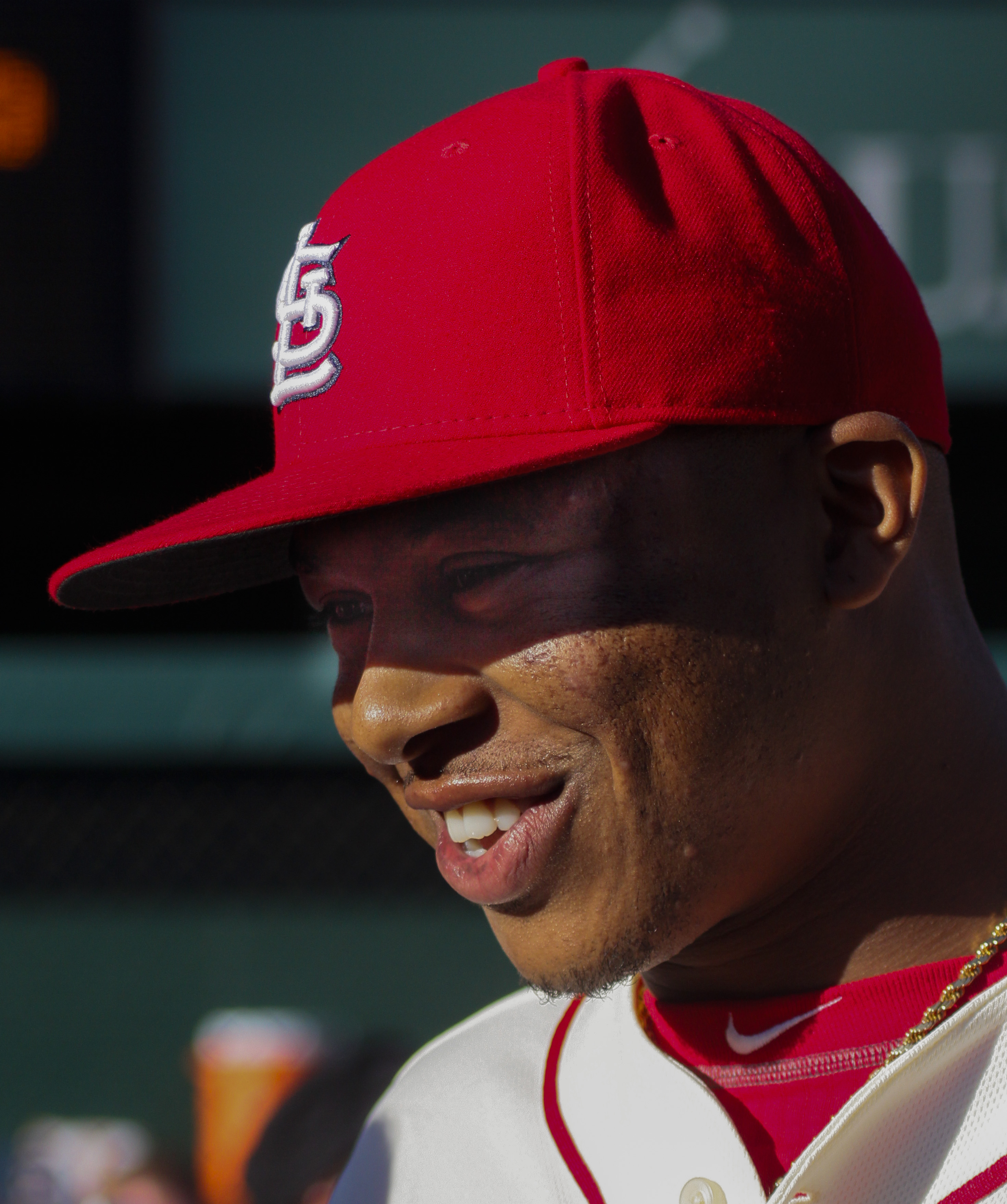
- Chambers with the St. Louis Cardinals in 2013
- Outfielder
- Born: October 8, 1986 (age 39); Pensacola, Florida, U.S.
- Batted: Left Threw: Left

MLB debut
- September 6, 2011, for the St. Louis Cardinals

Last MLB appearance
- September 29, 2013, for the St. Louis Cardinals

MLB statistics
- Batting average: .216
- Home runs: 0
- Runs batted in: 9
- Stats at Baseball Reference

Teams
- St. Louis Cardinals (2011–2013)

Career highlights and awards
- World Series champion (2011)

Adron Lamar Chambers (Ay-dron, born October 8, 1986) is an American former professional baseball outfielder. He played in Major League Baseball (MLB) for the St. Louis Cardinals from 2011 to 2013.

== Early life ==
Prior to playing professionally, Chambers attended Pensacola High School where he was the star quarterback for his team. He went on to attend Mississippi State University on a football scholarship before resuming his baseball career at Pensacola Junior College.

== Baseball career ==
=== St. Louis Cardinals ===
==== Minor leagues ====
The St. Louis Cardinals drafted Chambers in the 38th round of the 2007 MLB draft. He began his professional career in 2007, playing for the Johnson City Cardinals, hitting .279 in 36 games. In 2008, he played for the Quad Cities River Bandits, hitting .238 with 13 stolen bases in 95 games. He played for the Palm Beach Cardinals in 2009, hitting .283 with 21 stolen bases and 16 triples in 122 games. He split 2010 between the Springfield Cardinals (75 games) and Memphis Redbirds (37 games), hitting a combined .283 with 14 stolen bases in 112 games. He was a Texas League All-Star.

==== Major leagues ====
On September 6, 2011, Chambers was promoted to the major leagues for the first time. On September 16, during his second major league at-bat, Chambers recorded his first major league hit, which brought in the go-ahead runs for the Cardinals to beat the Philadelphia Phillies. Chambers, who had been brought in as a defensive replacement for Lance Berkman attempted an inside-the-park home run but was tagged out at home plate. Nevertheless, he was credited with a triple off of Michael Schwimer, who had walked Albert Pujols to face Chambers.

“I got a hit, an RBI, and a win all at the same time,” Chambers said. “I’m just trying to take it all in. These guys are congratulating me and making me feel good. Hopefully, if the situation comes up again, I can produce again.”

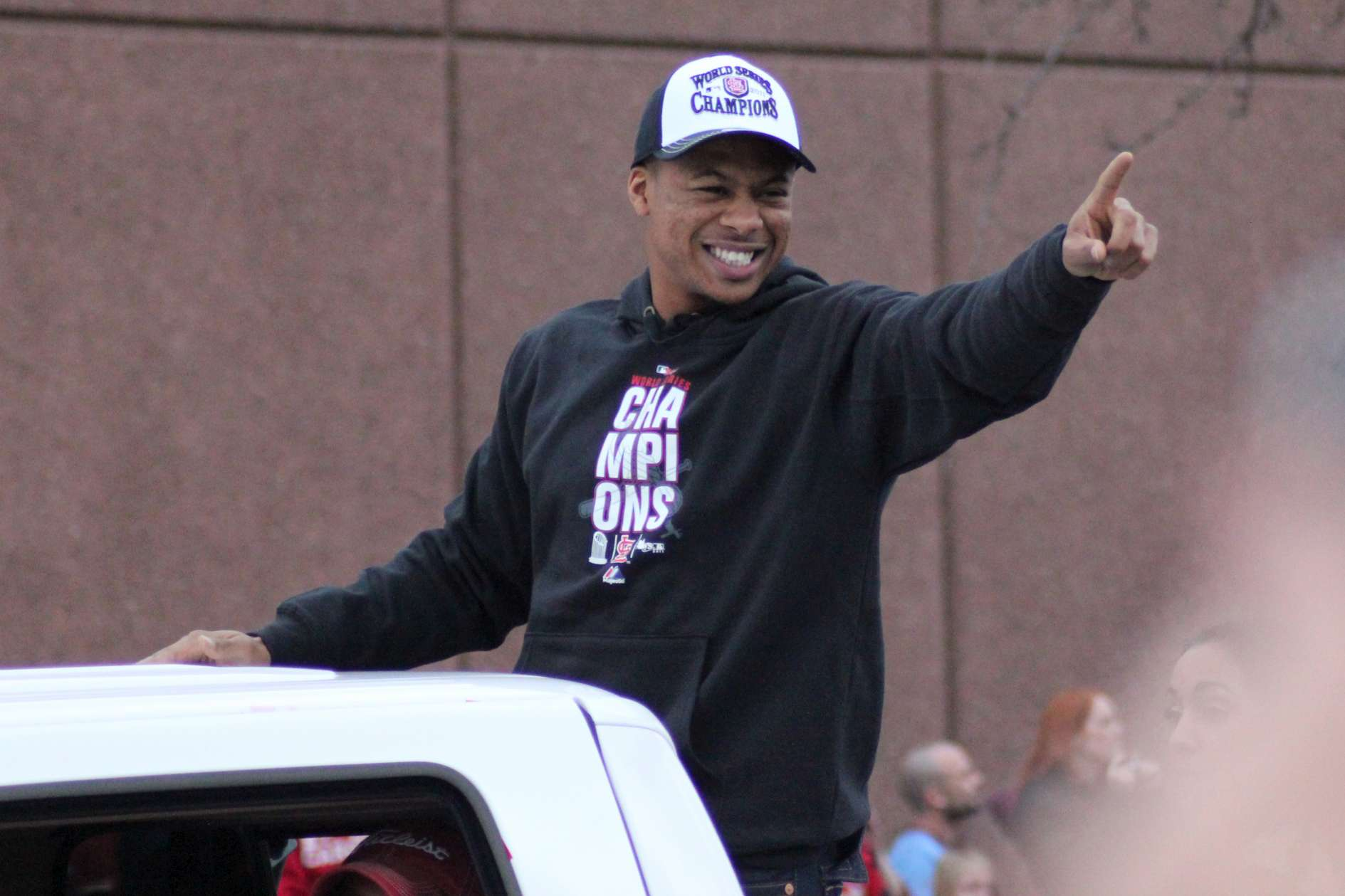
Chambers during 2011 World Series parade

Chambers was also noted for his contributions off the field to help spur the Cardinals on during their quest to win a Wild Card playoff berth. With the Cardinals' playoff hopes looking much in doubt prior to the bottom of the ninth inning during their game on September 24, 2011, against arch-rival Chicago Cubs, Chambers was shown on the WGN television broadcast of the game taking it upon himself to encourage and excite the hometown fans to join him in cheering for the team prior to the start of the inning. Incredibly, the Cardinals began to rally, and Chambers himself was then inserted into the game as a pinch runner, where he proceeded to score the winning run on a wild pitch. That down-to-the wire win was one of many that month that helped the Cardinals earn their playoff berth. On October 28, Chambers was added to the Cardinals' World Series roster as an emergency replacement for the injured Matt Holliday before Game 7 of the World Series against the Texas Rangers.

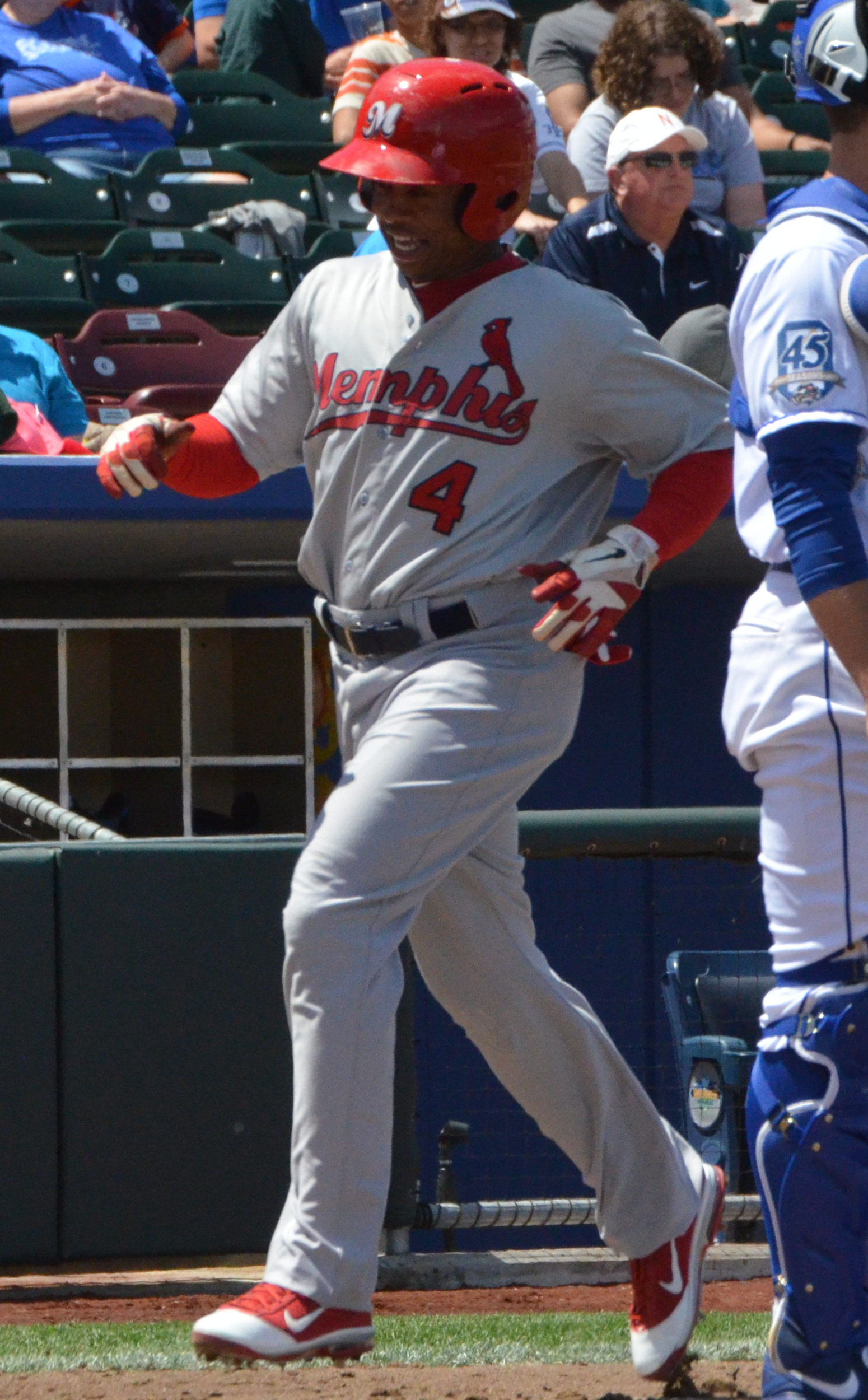
Chambers with the Memphis Redbirds in 2013

Chambers made 41 appearances for St. Louis during the 2012 campaign, batting .222/.300/.296 with four RBI and two stolen bases. He appeared in 25 games for the Cardinals in the 2013 season, batting .154/.241/.192 with one RBI. He was kept on the Cardinals' active roster through the 2013 National League (NL) Divisional Series and NL Championship Series. On November 5, Chambers was removed from the 40-man roster and sent outright to Memphis; he subsequently rejected the assignment and elected free agency.

=== Houston Astros ===
Chambers signed a minor league contract with the Houston Astros on November 26, 2013. He played in 17 games with the Astros during spring training before being assigned to the Triple-A Oklahoma City RedHawks to begin 2014. He was the team's starting center fielder and leadoff hitter but injured himself on a slide, dislocating his left ring finger in the 4th inning, and he was placed on the disabled list. He was activated on May 11 and played that day. In 25 games for the RedHawks, Chambers hit .281 with two home runs and 15 RBI.

=== Toronto Blue Jays ===
On June 12, 2014, Chambers was traded to the Toronto Blue Jays in exchange for minor leaguers Alejandro Solarte and Will Dupont. The Blue Jays subsequently assigned Chambers to the Triple-A Buffalo Bisons.

=== Chicago Cubs ===
On December 23, 2014, Chambers signed a minor league contract with the Chicago Cubs organization. He played in 88 games for the Triple-A Iowa Cubs in 2015, slashing .280/.358/.375 with one home run, 30 RBI, and nine stolen bases. He elected free agency following the season on November 6. After the season, he was suspended for 50 games for a positive test for a drug of abuse.

=== Bridgeport Bluefish ===
On June 13, 2016, Chambers signed with the Bridgeport Bluefish of the Atlantic League of Professional Baseball. In 30 games for the Bluefish, he batted .218/.289/.345 with two home runs, 10 RBI, and two stolen bases. Chambers was released by Bridgeport on July 26.

=== Ottawa Champions ===
On August 12, 2016, Chambers signed with the Ottawa Champions of the Can-Am League. He won the championship title with the Champions, defeating the Rockland Boulders 3–2 in a best-of-5 series on September 17, 2016. He re-signed on December 16. In 24 games in 2017, he hit .304/.351/.412 with 1 home run, 10 RBIs and 2 stolen bases.

=== Sussex County Miners ===
On June 3, 2017, Chambers was traded to the Sussex County Miners. In 55 appearances for Sussex County, he batted .295/.403/.399 with two home runs, 10 RBI, and 14 stolen bases. Chambers was released by the Miners on August 14.

=== Philadelphia Phillies ===
On February 12, 2018, Chambers signed a minor league contract with the Philadelphia Phillies. He was assigned to the Triple-A Lehigh Valley IronPigs to begin the year and served his 2015 suspension before playing in the minors at the end of May. Chambers was released by the Phillies organization on August 3.

=== Ottawa Champions (second stint) ===
On August 13, 2019, Chambers signed with the Ottawa Champions of the Can-Am League. In 19 appearances for Ottawa, he hit .187/.296/.293 with one home run, nine RBI, and two stolen bases. Chambers became a free agent following the season.

== Personal life ==
Chambers was arrested and charged with attempted sexual battery in October 2006 and suspended by the Mississippi State football team.
