= Bryan Augenstein =

American baseball player (born 1986)

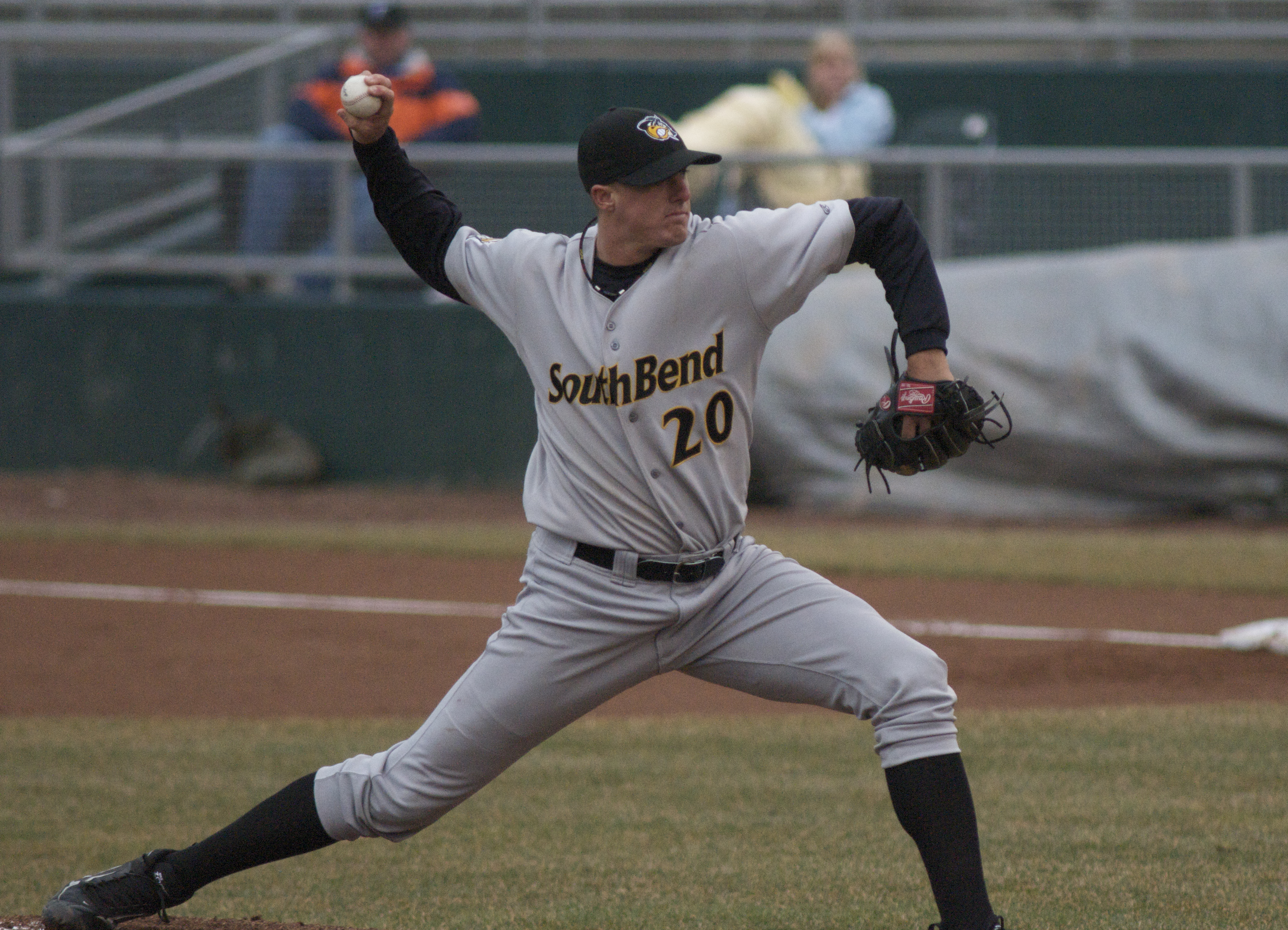
- Augenstein pitching for the South Bend Silver Hawks in 2008
- Pitcher
- Born: July 11, 1986 (age 40); Sebastian, Florida, U.S.
- Batted: Right Threw: Right

MLB debut
- May 13, 2009, for the Arizona Diamondbacks

Last appearance
- April 12, 2011, for the St. Louis Cardinals

MLB statistics
- Win–loss record: 0–2
- Earned run average: 8.34
- Strikeouts: 12
- Stats at Baseball Reference

Teams
- Arizona Diamondbacks (2009); St. Louis Cardinals (2011)

Bryan Christopher Augenstein (born July 11, 1986) is an American former professional baseball pitcher who played in Major League Baseball (MLB) for the Arizona Diamondbacks and St. Louis Cardinals.

== Early life ==
Augenstein was born in Sebastian, Florida. He graduated from Sebastian River High School in Sebastian, where he played for the Sebastian River Sharks high school baseball team.

== College career ==
Augenstein accepted an athletic scholarship to attend the University of Florida in Gainesville, Florida, and played for coach Pat McMahon's Florida Gators baseball team from 2005 to 2007. As a freshman in 2005, he was a member of the Gators team that finished as the runner-up in the College World Series. Memorably, Augenstein retired twenty-three consecutive batters against the Cincinnati Bearcats in 2006.

He was also a member of the U.S. national baseball team that played in the 2006 World Baseball Classic. He led the Gators in appearances, innings pitched, strikeouts and wins in both 2006 and 2007, and finished his three-year college career with five complete games and 216 strikeouts.

== Professional career ==
The Arizona Diamondbacks selected Augenstein in the seventh round of the 2007 Major League Baseball draft. He made his major league debut on May 13, 2009, against the Cincinnati Reds.

On October 13, 2010, Augenstein was claimed off waivers by the St. Louis Cardinals. He spent the 2012 season in the Tampa Bay Rays organization. He signed a minor league deal with the Detroit Tigers on March 26, 2014, and he became a free agent after the 2014 season.

== See also ==
- List of Florida Gators baseball players
