= Drew Baur =

Baur

Andrew N. Baur (April 25, 1944 – February 20, 2011) was a co-owner of the St. Louis Cardinals baseball team. Baur was a key member of the ownership group which purchased the team from Anheuser-Busch in March 1996. Baur served as the team's treasurer, and was a member of the Cardinals Board of Directors.

== Early life ==
Baur was born in St. Louis, Missouri, where he attended St. Louis Country Day School. He graduated from Washington and Lee University, and then earned his M.B.A. from the J. Mack Robinson College of Business at Georgia State University. A huge Cardinals fan, he attended high school with Cardinals chairman Bill DeWitt Jr. The two remained lifetime friends, with DeWitt investing in Baur's bank and later joining Baur's group which acquired the Cardinals.

== Banking career ==
Throughout his lifetime, Baur was a major figure in the St. Louis banking industry, serving as chairman of Southwest Bank and County Bank of St. Louis. Baur and another Cardinals board member, Fred Hanser, orchestrated the deal that formed Mississippi Valley Bancshares, a bank holding company, in 1984. Southwest Bank became one of its subsidiaries. Baur was also a former president and chairman of Commerce Bank of St. Louis and Mercantile Trust Company N.A.

== Death ==
Baur died on February 20, 2011.
