= 2012 St. Louis Cardinals season =

Major League Baseball season

2012 St. Louis Cardinals
- National League Wild Card winners
- League: National League
- Division: Central
- Ballpark: Busch Stadium
- City: St. Louis, Missouri
- Record: 88–74 (.543)
- Divisional place: 2nd
- Owners: William DeWitt Jr. Fred Hanser; Klingaman Group
- General managers: John Mozeliak
- Managers: Mike Matheny
- Television: Fox Sports Midwest (Dan McLaughlin, Al Hrabosky, Rick Horton)
- Radio: KMOX (1120AM) (Mike Shannon, John Rooney)
- Stats: ESPN.com; Baseball Reference

The 2012 St. Louis Cardinals season was the 131st season for the St. Louis Cardinals, a Major League Baseball franchise in St. Louis, Missouri. It was the 121st season for the Cardinals in the National League and their 7th at Busch Stadium III.

The Cardinals made their 25th trip to the postseason in 2012 after taking the NL Wild Card title by one game over the Atlanta Braves on the last day of the regular season in 2011. They began the 2012 season away against the Miami Marlins on April 4. St. Louis was coming off a 90–72 (.556) season, a second-place finish in the National League Central Division, the aforementioned wild card berth, and their National League-leading 11th World Series championship.

In 2012, they finished with an 88–74 (.543) record and second place in the NL Central. By virtue of coming in second to the Atlanta Braves, they won the second National League Wild Card spot, and then beat the Braves in the NLWC Game. They then played the NL East champion Washington Nationals in the NLDS and beat them in five games to advance to the NLCS against the San Francisco Giants. However, they lost to the Giants in seven games after leading the series 3 games to 1.

== Offseason departures and acquisitions ==
=== Management ===
On October 31, 2011, Tony La Russa announced his retirement after 16 years as manager of the Cardinals. After interviewing several candidates, the Cardinals announced, in a press conference on November 14, that former Cardinals catcher Mike Matheny would be the team's new manager, the 49th in team history. At 41, he was the youngest active manager in the majors. He holds the catching major league record for consecutive errorless games at 252, and for consecutive errorless chances with 1,565.

On November 16, Matheny and the Cardinals announced the new coaching staff: Dave Duncan stayed on as the pitching coach for the 17th year as he was the only coach under contract, with third-base coach Jose Oquendo, hitting coach and former Cardinals slugger Mark McGwire, and bullpen coach Derek Lilliquist. 50-year-old Mike Aldrete moved from assistant hitting coach to bench coach. Chris Maloney also 50 years of age, moved from manager of the AAA Memphis Redbirds of the Pacific Coast League to first-base coach in St. Louis; his first time on a major league staff. Former bench coach Joe Pettini and first-base coach Dave McKay moved to other roles in baseball operations for the team.

On December 2, former Cardinals outfielder John Mabry was named assistant hitting coach.

=== Hitters ===
On December 8, Albert Pujols signed a 10-year contract with the Los Angeles Angels worth $254 million, declining a 10-year $220 million offer by the Cardinals. His old contract paid him $111 million over eight years from 2004 to 2011. Pujols departed among the leaders in virtually every major offensive category in Cardinals franchise history. At the time of the signing of the contract, he was fourth all-time in hits, third in runs and second in total bases, doubles, home runs, RBIs and walks. He was behind only Stan Musial in the five latter categories. He was seventh in games played and could have climbed as high as third with two more seasons in a Cardinals uniform. He was paid $14,508,395 in 2011. His former teammates were stunned by his decision.

On December 10, the team re-signed Rafael Furcal to a two-year deal worth $14 mil.

On December 12, the Cardinals refused to offer a contract to Ryan Theriot, making him a non-tendered free agent.
On the same day, utilityman [2B/OF] Skip Schumaker accepted a two-year deal worth $3 mil. avoiding free agency after 2012. He was paid $4.7 mil. in his just completed two-year deal.

On December 22, the Cardinals signed outfielder Carlos Beltrán to a two-year deal.

On March 1, 2012, the Cardinals announced the extension of catcher Yadier Molina's expiring $7 mil. contract at the end of 2012, for 5 years (with a 6th year $15 mil. option for 2018) for $75 mil., making him the second-highest-paid catcher (to Twins catcher Joe Mauer) in all of baseball. He leads all catchers with 39 pickoffs since 2005, and has thrown out 44% of all basestealers in his eight years. He led all Cardinals batters in 2011 with a .305 batting average, starting more games behind the plate than any other catcher, and established career-highs with 55 runs scored, 32 doubles, 14 home runs, and 65 RBIs.

=== Pitchers ===
On December 15, 2011, the Cardinals signed 35-year-old lefty reliever J. C. Romero to a one-year contract.

The Cardinals invited nineteen players to spring training camp.

The team finished setting its 25-man roster on March 30. Placed on the DL were pitcher Chris Carpenter, utilityman Skip Schumaker, and outfielder Allen Craig.

== Regular season ==
=== April ===
On Sunday, April 22 at Pittsburgh, the Cardinals became the first defending world champion team since the 1922 New York Giants to open their title defense with six consecutive series win. They had a record of 11-5 (.688) during that streak. The series streak ended on April 24, with a second consecutive loss to the Cubs in Chicago, although winning the final game of the series on April 25.

=== May ===
The Cardinals announced they would retire former manager Tony La Russa' #10 prior to the game on May 11. His number will be the 12th retired by the Cardinals. He ranks third on the managers' all-time wins list with 2,728. 1,408 of those came with the Cardinals in his 16-year tenure there, and his .544 winning percentage with the team is his best of the three clubs he managed in his 33 seasons.

On May 14, Carlos Beltrán was named the National League Player of the Week for the week of May 7–13 after posting six home runs, 13 RBIs, eight runs scored, 30 total bases, and a 1.200 slugging percentage. He collected hits in five of the six games, homering in four of them. This is Beltran's ninth Player of the Week Award and his sixth in the National League. He leads the National League with 15 home runs, and is second in RBIs, with 32.

At home on May 22, Adam Wainwright threw his first complete game shutout since August 6, 2010, in a 4−0 victory over the San Diego Padres. Wainwright missed the entire 2011 season recovering from elbow surgery. It was his ninth career complete game and just his third shutout.

=== June ===
Johan Santana threw the first no-hitter in New York Mets' 51-year history (totaling 8,019 regular season and 74 post-season games previously) with an 8−0 shutout over the Cardinals and Adam Wainwright at Citi Field on June 1. 27,069 witnessed the no-hitter, with Santana throwing a career-high 134 pitches. He walked five, and struck out eight. (box score) Left fielder Mike Baxter robbed Yadier Molina with a great catch in the seventh inning for the 20th out. Umpire Adrian Johnson ruled a hard grounder by former Met Carlos Beltrán (in his first return to New York) down the third-base line 'foul' although the ball made a mark on the chalk in the sixth inning. Beltran subsequently grounded out to third base on the next pitch. The no-hitter was the eighth against the Cardinals in their long history, the first time by Hall-of-Famer Christy Mathewson on July 15, 1901. The previous no-hitter against the Cardinals was by Fernando Valenzuela on June 29, 1990, at Dodger Stadium. The Cardinals were also the first defending World Series champion to be pitched a no-hitter against since the Oakland Athletics in their 1990 pennant season. On the opposite side, Cardinals' pitchers have thrown 10 no-hitters against opponents, the last one by Bud Smith against the San Diego Padres on September 3, 2001. The Padres are now the only present team without a no-hitter.

On June 7, Jaime García (left-hander), landed on the disabled list after his 2-inning June 5 start with a left shoulder sprain. He is the eighth player on it, one-off the season high of nine—at the same time with the seven others which include two starting pitchers (he and Chris Carpenter), two relievers (Scott Linebrink and Kyle McClellan), two infielders (Lance Berkman and Matt Carpenter), and two outfielders (Jon Jay and Skip Schumaker).

On June 15, batting against his old team the Kansas City Royals, Carlos Beltrán became the first switch-hitter in MLB history to attain 300 home runs and 300 stolen bases, with his seventh stolen base in the second inning. Seven other hitters also are members of the 300-300 club.

=== July ===
Carlos Beltrán (of) and Rafael Furcal (ss) won the fan voting to be starters at their positions for the 83rd All-Star Game in Kansas City's Kauffman Stadium on July 10. Yadier Molina (c) was selected by the players as a reserve for his fourth consecutive year; he ranked second in the voting to starter Buster Posey. Lance Lynn was also selected by the players as a reserve pitcher; his first time going to the All-Star Game. Retired Cardinals' manager Tony La Russa will un-retire for the one game. Coaches Derek Lilliquist, Jose Oquendo and Mark McGwire will also be participating in the event, as all are members of La Russa's All-Star staff. Former St. Louis coaches Joe Pettini, Dave McKay and Dave Duncan are members of that coaching staff, as well. Beltran is leading the NL with 61 RBIs, and second in home runs with 20. He also ranks in the top 10 with a .310 batting average. It will be his fourth time as an All-Star fan-vote starter, seventh overall. As an added bonus for Beltran, he was also picked to participate in the Home Run Derby contest on July 9, the night before the All-Star Game. It will be the first time for him in that fan-favorite event.

On July 6, after the passing of Yadier Molina's wife's grandfather, he left the team to join his family in Puerto Rico and was put on the bereavement list. He will miss the three weekend games and won't participate in the All-Star game. Matt Holliday was picked by Tony La Russa to replace him on the roster. Bryan Anderson was recalled from AAA-Memphis to replace Molina on the Cardinals' roster, with Tony Cruz to start as catcher for the weekend games.

After the rosters were opened to the fans, voting was held to decide the final fan-voted addition to each team. The online balloting was conducted from Sunday afternoon, July 1, through Thursday afternoon, July 5. The winners of the final vote were David Freese of the St. Louis Cardinals (NL), and Yu Darvish of the Texas Rangers (AL). Chipper Jones, of the Atlanta Braves, was removed from the ballot on July 3 after he replaced Matt Kemp on the roster due to Kemp's injury.

The 83rd All-Star Game on July 10, at Kansas City's Kaufmann Stadium was an 8-0 blowout for the National League, its sixth shutout win against two shutout losses for the NL. It made retired manager Tony La Russa the first manager to win All-Star Games in both leagues. He was 3-0 in the AL, but 0-2 in the NL before this year's game. La Russa emphasized this was his final game as a manager.

On July 3, the team and disabled pitcher Chris Carpenter decided he will have season-ending surgery to repair his thoracic outlet syndrome that has plagued him all year with nerve-related shoulder problems. Recovery time is estimated at six months, so if done this month he will be ready for spring training in February 2013. Surgery is set for July 19, performed by Dr. Gregory Pearl in Dallas, Texas.

On July 16, Trevor Rosenthal was called up for the first time to the major leagues, and made his debut in the eighth inning on July 18, the 2,000th player in Cardinals' history. No other franchise in baseball has reached 2,000.

On July 21, at home against the Cubs, a 0−0 tight game started by Jake Westbrook (8-8, after getting the win in 7 inn.) was broken in the bottom of the seventh with a 12-run explosion by the Cardinals, won by that 12−0 score with 16 hits against only 4 for the Cubs. The inning-explosion featured 7 doubles, tying a major-league record set by the (NL) 1936 Boston Bees (against the Cardinals at Sportsmen's Park, first inning on August 25), 17 batters with 10 hits including a triple, 2 singles, 2 walks, and a wild pitch. David Freese started the inning with an infield single. Allen Craig then got one of his two doubles that inning, and the merry-go-round was on. The 12-runs in an inning also tied the highest runs in any inning by a Cardinals' team since the 1926 club did it in the third inning against the Phillies on September 15. Gameday Recap The club got 27 total bases and 9 doubles in the game—the last time they did that was on July 12, 1931.

The team made a trade on the last day of the non-waiver deadline, July 31, sending minor-league third baseman Zack Cox to the Miami Marlins for minor-league relief pitcher Edward Mujica.

=== August ===
On August 3, Lance Berkman went on the disabled list for the third time this season with knee problems.

Matt Holliday got his 1,500th career hit on August 30.

=== September ===
Yadier Molina got his 1,000th career hit on September 4, a rare infield single.

Shelby Miller got his first major league win as a reliever, in a crucial fourth game of the series, in the 12th-inning against the Los Angeles Dodgers on September 16.

On September 17, the Cardinals announced they were moving their short-season affiliation with the Batavia (NY) Muckdogs to the State College (PA) Spikes in the same New York–Penn League.

On September 19, the Cardinals announced they were moving their low-A team from Quad Cities (Iowa) back to Peoria (Illinois) where they had the team from 1995 to 2004, in the Midwest League.

On September 19, David Freese and Yadier Molina hit their 20th home runs of the seasons. It marked the first time in Cardinals' history that five players have hit 20 home runs in a season, with the shutout win against the Houston Astros. Carlos Beltrán (29), Matt Holliday (27), and Allen Craig (21) reached 20 previously.

On September 20, the Cardinals went over the 3 million attendance figure for the ninth consecutive year.

On September 21, Chris Carpenter returned to the rotation for the first time this season after surgery in July, refuting doctors' predictions of no pitching possible in 2012. He faced 22 batters (77 pitches, 47 strikes) in pitching five innings, giving up five hits (incl. a double and triple) and two runs, hitting one batter, walking one, and striking out two against the Chicago Cubs in Chicago, leading 3−2 after the fifth inning, but Fernando Salas blew the save for him with two-outs and two strikes in the ninth when leading 4–2, and the team lost in 11 innings. "My stuff wasn't as sharp as I'd like, it wasn't even as sharp as it's been in those simulated games", said Carpenter, who preceded this start with four simulated games. "I did the best I could to get as many outs as I could and give us a chance. It was fun to go out there. It's definitely something I can build on, and hopefully my stuff is sharper as I get out there more often."

On September 23, Pete Kozma hit his first home run. The next game on the 24th he hit his second home run.

On September 24, closer Jason Motte was named NL Player of the Week after saving all five of the Cardinals' wins in the week of September 17–23, and is leading the NL in saves with his 40th. He became the first closer with the Cardinals to save 40 games since Jason Isringhausen in 2004. It was the first time he has won that award, and the first time a closer had won it since Huston Street in 2009.

=== October ===
On October 2, despite losing in their 161st game with a chance to clinch in front of almost 40,000 fans, the team later clinched the second wild-card spot when the Los Angeles Dodgers lost to their arch-rival San Francisco Giants.

For the last game of the season at home on October 3, Shelby Miller, who started 2012 as the club's top prospect, made his major league debut as a starter against the Cincinnati Reds. He has already had five appearances (1-0, 2.35 ERA) in 7.2 IP as a reliever.

== Season standings ==
=== NL Central standings ===
NL Central
Team	W	L	Pct.	GB	Home	Road
Cincinnati Reds	97	65	.599	—	50‍–‍31	47‍–‍34
St. Louis Cardinals	88	74	.543	9	50‍–‍31	38‍–‍43
Milwaukee Brewers	83	79	.512	14	49‍–‍32	34‍–‍47
Pittsburgh Pirates	79	83	.488	18	45‍–‍36	34‍–‍47
Chicago Cubs	61	101	.377	36	38‍–‍43	23‍–‍58
Houston Astros	55	107	.340	42	35‍–‍46	20‍–‍61

=== NL Wild Card ===
Division leaders
Team	W	L	Pct.
Washington Nationals	98	64	.605
Cincinnati Reds	97	65	.599
San Francisco Giants	94	68	.580

Wild Card teams (Top 2 teams qualify for postseason)
Team	W	L	Pct.	GB
Atlanta Braves	94	68	.580	+6
St. Louis Cardinals	88	74	.543	—
Los Angeles Dodgers	86	76	.531	2
Milwaukee Brewers	83	79	.512	5
Philadelphia Phillies	81	81	.500	7
Arizona Diamondbacks	81	81	.500	7
Pittsburgh Pirates	79	83	.488	9
San Diego Padres	76	86	.469	12
New York Mets	74	88	.457	14
Miami Marlins	69	93	.426	19
Colorado Rockies	64	98	.395	24
Chicago Cubs	61	101	.377	27
Houston Astros	55	107	.340	33

=== Performance Against National League Opponents ===
2012 National League record Source: MLB Standings Grid – 2012
Team	AZ	ATL	CHC	CIN	COL	MIA	HOU	LAD	MIL	NYM	PHI	PIT	SD	SF	STL	WSH	AL
Arizona	–	2–5	5–4	2–5	9–7	5–3	6–0	12–6	3–3	3–4	2–4	3–4	7–11	9–9	1–5	2–4	9–6
Atlanta	5–2	–	3–4	1–5	6–1	14–4	4–2	3–3	3–3	12–6	12–6	3–4	4–3	3–4	5–1	8–10	8–10
Chicago	4–5	4–3	–	4–12	2–4	8–5	2–4	2–4	4–13	4–2	2–4	8–8	3–3	1–6	7–10	1–6	5–10
Cincinnati	5–2	5–1	12–4	–	5–1	10–5	2–4	3–3	9–6	6–2	3–4	11–7	6–2	4–3	6–7	2–5	7–8
Colorado	7–9	1–6	4–2	1–5	–	5–2	5–2	8–10	5–1	5–2	2–7	2–4	8–10	4–14	2–5	4–3	2–13
Houston	0–6	2–4	5–8	5–10	2–5	–	2–4	2–4	8–9	4–2	3–3	5–12	3–5	1–8	4–11	1–7	6–9
Los Angeles	6–12	3–3	4–2	4–2	10–8	4–2	–	4–2	1–6	4–3	5–2	6–1	11–7	8-10	6–5	4–2	6–9
Miami	3–5	4–14	4–2	3–3	4–3	–	4-2	2-4	4–4	4–12	8–10	1–4	5–1	5–2	2–5	9–9	5–13
Milwaukee	3–3	3–3	13–4	6–9	1–5	9–8	6–1	4–4	–	3–2	2–5	11–4	3–4	2–4	6–9	3–5	6–9
New York	4–3	6–12	2–4	2–6	2–5	2–4	3–4	12–4	2–3	–	10–8	5–2	4–3	4–4	4–3	4–14	8–7
Philadelphia	4–2	6–12	4–2	4–3	7–2	3–3	2–5	10–8	5–2	8–10	–	3–4	4–3	2–4	5–2	9-9	5–10
Pittsburgh	4–3	2–3	8–8	7–11	4–2	4–1	12–5	1–6	4–11	2–5	4–3	–	1–5	3–3	8–7	3–2	10–8
San Diego	11–7	3–4	3–3	2–6	10–8	5–3	7–11	1–5	4–3	3–4	3–4	5–1	–	6–12	3–3	2–3	8–7
San Francisco	9–9	4–3	6–1	3–4	14–4	2–5	8–1	10–8	4–2	4–4	4–2	3–3	12–6	–	3–3	1–5	7–8
St. Louis	5–1	1–5	10–7	7–6	5–2	11–4	5–6	5–2	9–6	3–4	3–4	7–8	3–3	3–3	–	3–4	8–7
Washington	4–2	10–8	6–1	5–2	3–4	7–1	2–4	9–9	5–3	14–4	9-9	2–3	3–2	5-1	4-3	–	10–8

=== Performance Against American League Opponents ===
Team	W-L Record
Chicago White Sox	2-1
Cleveland Indians	1-2
Detroit Tigers	1-2
Kansas City Royals	4–2

=== Performance Against Divisions ===
Divisions	Home	Road	Total	Total Pct.
NL Central	26-12	19-20	45-32	.584
NL East	7-9	7-11	14-20	.412
NL West	13-5	8-10	21-15	.583
Interleague/AL Central	4-5	4-2	8-7	.533
TOTAL	50-31	38-43	88-74	.543

== Players and Coaching Staff ==
=== Opening Day lineup ===
Number	Name	Position
15	Rafael Furcal	SS
3	Carlos Beltrán	RF
7	Matt Holliday	LF
12	Lance Berkman	1B
23	David Freese	3B
4	Yadier Molina	C
19	Jon Jay	CF
33	Daniel Descalso	2B
26	Kyle Lohse	P

=== Roster ===
2012 St. Louis Cardinals
**Roster**
**Pitchers**: 41 Mitchell Boggs; 62 Barret Browning; 29 Chris Carpenter; 63 Maikel Cleto; 65 Brandon Dickson; 44 Chuckie Fick; 61 Sam Freeman; 40 Brian Fuentes; 54 Jaime García; 58 Joe Kelly; 26 Kyle Lohse; 31 Lance Lynn; 66 Víctor Marté; 46 Kyle McClellan; 40 Shelby Miller; 30 Jason Motte; 44 Edward Mujica; 16 J. C. Romero; 64 Trevor Rosenthal; 34 Marc Rzepczynski; 59 Fernando Salas; 52 Eduardo Sánchez; 50 Adam Wainwright; 35 Jake Westbrook	**Catchers**: 16 Bryan Anderson; 48 Tony Cruz; 4 Yadier Molina; **Infielders**: 53 Matt Adams; 12 Lance Berkman; 13 Matt Carpenter; 21 Allen Craig; 33 Daniel Descalso; 23 David Freese; 15 Rafael Furcal; 27 Tyler Greene; 60 Steven Hill; 8 Ryan Jackson; 38 Pete Kozma; 55 Skip Schumaker	**Outfielders**: 3 Carlos Beltrán; 56 Adron Chambers; 7 Matt Holliday; 19 Jon Jay; 44 Erik Komatsu; 43 Shane Robinson	**Manager**: 22 Mike Matheny; **Coaches**: 28 Mike Aldrete (bench); 36 Derek Lilliquist (pitching); 47 John Mabry (assistant hitting); 37 Chris Maloney (first base); 25 Mark McGwire (hitting); 49 Dyar Miller (bullpen); 11 José Oquendo (third base); 39 Jamie Pogue (bullpen catcher)

=== Minor Leagues ===
==== Farm system ====
Level	Team	League	Manager
AAA	Memphis Redbirds	Pacific Coast League	Ron Warner
AA	Springfield Cardinals	Texas League	Mike Shildt
A	Palm Beach Cardinals	Florida State League	Johnny Rodríguez
A	Quad Cities River Bandits	Midwest League	Luis Aguayo
A-Short Season	Batavia Muckdogs	New York–Penn League	Dann Bilardello
Rookie	Johnson City Cardinals	Appalachian League	Oliver Marmol
Rookie	GCL Cardinals	Gulf Coast League	Steve Turco

LEAGUE CHAMPIONS: Springfield

For more information about minor league teams, minor league players and the St. Louis Cardinals organization, see St. Louis Cardinals minor league players and:

St. Louis Cardinals Farm System Affiliates
2012 Prospect Watch
Cards organization preview, Top 20 Prospects, MLB.com (February 8, 2012)
Memphis Redbirds (Memphis Redbirds-AAA roster)
Springfield Cardinals (Springfield Cardinals-AA roster)

=== Final Regular Season Statistics ===
==== Composite scoring by inning ====
INNING	1	2	3	4	5	6	7	8	9	10	11	12	13	14	15	16	17	18	19	TOTAL
CARDINALS	115	85	106	59	78	91	90	84	46	5	0	4	0	1	0	0	1	0	0	765
OPPONENTS	102	55	65	69	50	98	77	64	46	10	2	2	1	1	2	0	1	0	3	648

==== Batters ====
Notes: G = Games played; AB = At bats; R = Runs; H = Hits; 2B = Doubles; HR = Home runs; RBI = Runs batted in; BB = Walks; SO = Strikeouts; GIDP = Grounded into double play; Avg. = Batting average; OBP = On-base percentage; SLG = Slugging percentage

Players HITTING statistics

=Team leader

Player	G	AB	R	H	2B	HR	RBI	BB	SO	GIDP	Avg.	OBP	SLG
Matt Holliday	157	599	95	177	36	27	102	75	132	16	.295	.379	.497
Carlos Beltrán	151	547	83	147	26	32	97	65	124	9	.269	.346	.495
Yadier Molina	138	505	65	159	28	22	76	45	55	10	.315	.373	.501
David Freese	144	501	70	147	25	20	79	57	122	19	.293	.372	.467
Rafael Furcal † (leadoff -8/30)	121	477	69	126	18	5	49	44	57	7	.264	.325	.346
Allen Craig (utility/1b)	119	469	76	144	35	22	92	37	89	15	.307	.354	.522
Jon Jay	117	443	70	135	22	4	40	34	71	9	.305	.373	.400
Daniel Descalso	143	374	41	85	10	4	26	37	83	5	.227	.303	.324
Matt Carpenter	114	296	44	87	22	6	46	34	63	10	.294	.365	.463
Skip Schumaker	107	272	37	75	14	1	28	27	50	6	.276	.339	.368
Tyler Greene	77	179	16	39	9	4	19	13	56	4	.218	.272	.358
Shane Robinson	102	166	20	42	8	3	16	14	32	5	.253	.309	.355
Matt Adams	27	86	8	21	6	2	13	5	24	3	.244	.286	.384
Lance Berkman ( -9/7)	32	81	12	21	7	2	7	14	19	3	.259	.381	.444
Pete Kozma	26	72	11	24	5	2	14	7	19	4	.333	.383	.569
Adron Chambers	41	54	4	12	0	0	4	5	18	0	.222	.300	.296
Erik Komatsu	15	19	3	4	0	0	0	2	2	0	.211	.286	.211
Ryan Jackson	13	17	2	2	0	0	0	1	3	1	.118	.167	.118
Bryan Anderson	10	12	2	3	1	0	0	1	6	0	.250	.357	.333
Steven Hill	9	10	1	2	1	0	0	0	3	0	.200	.200	.300
Pitcher Totals	162	317	25	42	8	2	13	13	145	5	.132	.166	.183
**Team totals** (10/3)	**162**	**5,622**	**765**	**1,526**	**290**	**159**	**732**	**533**	**1,192**	**135**	**.271**	**.338**	**.421**
NL Rank	---	**1**	2	**1**	6	7	2	4	13	2	2	**1**	4

BOLD = Lead NL
* not on active roster
** on personal leave; date and G missed
† on 15-day disabled list; date DL and G missed
†† on 60-day disabled list

TEAM HITTING statistics

Baseball Reference – 2012 St. Louis Cardinals

==== Starting pitchers ====
Note: GS = Games started; IP = Innings pitched; W = Wins; L = Losses; ERA = Earned run average; H = Hits allowed; HR = Home runs allowed; BB = Walks allowed; SO = Strikeouts; WHIP = (walks + hits) per inning pitched; HBP = Hit by pitch; BF = Batters faced; O-AVG = Opponent batting average.; O-OBP = Opponent on-base percentage.; O-SLG = Opponent slugging percentage.; R suppt = Runs support average from his team's batters per games started

Cardinals PITCHING statistics

Sortable TEAM PITCHING Statistics

=Team leader

Player	GS	IP	W	L	ERA	H	HR	BB	SO	WHIP	HBP	BF	O-AVG	O-OBP	O-SLG	R suppt
Kyle Lohse	33	211.0	16	3	2.86	192	19	38	143	1.09	4	864	.239	.274	.368	4.4
Adam Wainwright (2 ShO)	32	198.2	14	13	3.94	196	15	52	184	1.25	6	831	.259	.309	.392	4.5
Jake Westbrook (1 CG)	28	174.2	13	11	3.97	191	12	52	106	1.39	8	751	.282	.338	.391	5.1
Lance Lynn (as starter only)	29	169.0	17	5	3.67	157	15	62	174	1.30	9	710	.248	.322	.396	5.9
Jaime García	20	121.2	7	7	3.92	136	7	30	98	1.36	0	515	.289	.327	.402	4.2
Joe Kelly (as starter only)	16	91.1	4	6	3.74	97	9	32	59	1.41	2	391	.275	.338	.419	4.4
Chris Carpenter	3	17.0	0	2	3.71	16	2	3	12	1.12	2	72	.242	.296	.424	1.7
Shelby Miller (as starter only)	1	6.0	0	0	0.00	1	0	2	7	0.50	1	21	.056	.190	.056	1.0
**Starters' Totals**	**162**	**989.1**	**71**	**47**	**3.62**	**986**	**79**	**271**	**783**	**1.27**	**32**	**4,155**	**.261**	**.313**	**.390**	**4.75**

Bold = lead NL * not on active roster
† on 15-day disabled list; DL date and G missed
†† on 60-day disabled list

==== Relief pitchers ====
Notes: G = Games pitched; IP = Innings pitched; W = Wins; L = Losses; ERA = Earned run average; H = Hits allowed; HR = Home runs allowed; BB = Walks allowed; SO = Strikeouts; WHIP = (walks + hits) per inning pitched; HBP = Hit by pitch; BF = Batters faced; O-AVG = Opponent batting average; O-OBP = Opponent on-base percentage; O-SLG = Opponent slugging percentage

17-27; 3.90 ERA; 473.1 IP; 434 H; 212 R; 205 ER; 55 HR; 165 BB; 435 SO; 1.266 WHIP
42/64 SV/Opp; 115 Holds; 343/492 First Batter Retired (70%); 64/242 Inherited Runners Scored (26%)

Relievers statistics

Pitcher	G	IP	W	L	ERA	H	HR	BB	SO	WHIP	HBP	BF	O-AVG	O-OBP	O-SLG
Lance Lynn (2012 totals)	35	176.0	18	7	3.78	168	16	64	180	1.32	10	744	.253	.327	.401
Joe Kelly (2012 totals)	24	107.0	5	7	3.53	112	10	36	75	1.38	3	457	.271	.333	.407
Mitchell Boggs	78	73.1	4	1	2.21	56	5	21	58	1.05	2	279	.211	.279	.291
Jason Motte*	67	72.0	4	5	2.75	49	9	17	86	0.92	2	296	.191	.245	.331
Fernando Salas	65	58.2	1	4	4.30	56	5	27	60	1.42	1	256	.251	.335	.386
Marc Rzepczynski	70	46.2	1	3	4.24	46	7	17	33	1.35	0	196	.257	.321	.408
Víctor Marte	48	40.1	3	2	4.91	51	6	14	36	1.61	2	185	.305	.364	.491
Edward Mujica	29	26.1	0	0	1.03	29	1	3	21	0.87	0	97	.215	.240	.323
Trevor Rosenthal	19	22.2	0	2	2.78	14	2	7	25	0.93	1	89	.175	.250	.263
Sam Freeman	24	20.0	0	2	5.40	17	2	10	18	1.35	1	84	.230	.329	.324
Barret Browning	22	19.1	1	3	5.12	18	2	7	11	1.29	0	83	.247	.305	.397
Kyle McClellan	16	18.2	0	1	5.30	16	2	9	11	1.34	2	72	.222	.325	.375
Eduardo Sánchez	17	15.0	0	1	6.60	11	2	13	13	1.60	1	70	.204	.362	.352
Shelby Miller (2012 totals)	6	13.2	1	0	1.32	9	0	4	16	0.95	1	54	.184	.259	.204
Maikel Cleto	9	9.0	0	0	7.00	13	4	2	15	1.67	1	41	.342	.390	.737
J.C. Romero	11	8.0	0	0	10.13	14	3	2	5	2.00	1	41	.368	.415	.658
Brandon Dickson	4	6.1	0	0	7.11	10	2	2	6	1.90	0	32	.333	.375	.633
Brian Fuentes	6	5.0	0	0	9.00	6	1	5	6	2.20	0	26	.300	.423	.500
C.J. Fick	2	1.2	0	0	5.40	3	0	1	0	2.40	0	9	.429	.500	.571

- Note: Jason Motte led all relief pitchers with 42 saves, recording all the total team saves for the season. He was also the National League leader in saves as well.

== Scheduling and Results ==
=== Home attendance ===
Year	Attendance (games)	AVG/game	NL Rank
2012	3,262,109 (81)	40,273	4th of 16
2011	3,093,954 (81)	38,197	3rd of 16

2012 St. Louis Cardinals
2011 St. Louis Cardinals

=== Game log ===
As with all 30 teams, Major League Baseball released the Cardinals' 2012 schedule on September 14, 2011. The Cardinals' Opening Day game was away against the Miami Marlins on April 4 and was nationally televised by ESPN at 6 PM CDT.

All game times for the following table were in Central Time Zone, and were broadcast on Fox Sports Midwest, unless otherwise noted. Twenty games from April 9 to August 10 were blacked out for those watching Fox Sports Midwest from their AT&T U-verse cable because of a financial dispute between them continuing from the previous year. Those games are marked with an asterisk (*) in the schedule below.

Legend
Cardinals Win	Cardinals Loss	Game Postponed / Tie

2012 Game Log
April (14–8) (.636)

#	Date	Opponent / Time	Score	Win	Loss	Save	Attendance	Record
1	April 4	@ Marlins 6:05pm (ESPN)	4–1	Lohse (1–0)	Johnson (0–1)	Motte (1)	36,601	1–0
2	April 6	@ Brewers 3:10pm	11–5	García (1–0)	Gallardo (0–1)		46,086	2–0
3	April 7	@ Brewers 3:05pm (Fox)	6–0	Greinke (1–0)	Wainwright (0–1)		42,084	2–1
4	April 8	@ Brewers 1:10pm	9–3	Lynn (1–0)	Wolf (0–1)		33,211	3–1
5	April 9	@ Reds 6:10pm *	7–1	Westbrook (1–0)	Bailey (0–1)		16,909	4–1
6	April 10	@ Reds 6:10pm *	3–1	Lohse (2–0)	Leake (0–1)	Motte (2)	17,110	5–1
7	April 11	@ Reds 11:35am	4–3	Chapman (2–0)	Rzepczynski (0–1)		20,672	5–2
8	April 13	Cubs 2:15pm	9–5	Samardzija (2–0)	Wainwright (0–2)		46,882	5–3
9	April 14	Cubs 12:05pm (Fox)	5–1	Lynn (2–0)	Volstad (0–1)		46,792	6–3
10	April 15	Cubs 1:15pm *	10–3	Westbrook (2–0)	Maholm (0–2)		44,952	7–3
11	April 17	Reds 7:15pm *	2–1 (10)	Motte (1–0)	LeCure (0–1)		35,562	8–3
12	April 18	Reds 7:15pm	11–1	García (2–0)	Latos (0–2)		35,907	9–3
13	April 19	Reds 12:45pm	6–3	Arroyo (1–0)	Wainwright (0–3)	Marshall (2)	40,049	9–4
14	April 20	@ Pirates 6:05pm	4–1	Lynn (3–0)	Morton (0–1)	Motte (3)	23,509	10–4
15	April 21	@ Pirates 6:05pm	2–0	Burnett (1–0)	Westbrook (2–1)	Hanrahan (2)	25,218	10–5
16	April 22	@ Pirates 12:35pm	5–1	Lohse (3–0)	Bédard (0–4)		30,437	11–5
17	April 23	@ Cubs 7:05pm *	3–2	Dolis (1–1)	Motte (1–1)		37,794	11–6
18	April 24	@ Cubs 7:05pm	3–2 (10)	Russell (1–0)	Salas (0–1)		38,894	11–7
19	April 25	@ Cubs 1:20pm	5–1	Lynn (4–0)	Volstad (0–3)		34,894	12–7
20	April 27	Brewers 7:15pm *	13–1	Westbrook (3–1)	Gallardo (1–2)		43,063	13–7
21	April 28	Brewers 12:05pm (Fox)	7–3	Lohse (4–0)	Estrada (0–1)		42,586	14–7
22	April 29	Brewers 1:15pm	3–2	Greinke (3–1)	García (2–1)	Axford (5)	45,824	14–8

May (13-16) (.448)

#	Date	Opponent / Time	Score	Win	Loss	Save	Attendance	Record
23	May 1	Pirates 7:15pm	10–7	Wainwright (1–3)	Morton (1–2)	Motte (4)	36,345	15–8
24	May 2	Pirates 7:15pm *	12–3	Lynn (5–0)	Burnett (1–2)		35,987	16–8
25	May 3	Pirates 12:45pm *	6–3	Bédard (2–4)	Westbrook (3–2)		40,601	16–9
26	May 4	@ Astros 7:05pm	5–4	Harrell (2–2)	Lohse (4–1)	Myers (7)	27,201	16–10
27	May 5	@ Astros 6:05pm	8–2	Norris (2–1)	García (2–2)		23,633	16–11
28	May 6	@ Astros 1:05pm	8–1	Wainwright (2–3)	Happ (2–2)		22,288	17–11
29	May 7	@ D'backs 8:40pm	9–6	Lynn (6–0)	Saunders (2–2)	Motte (5)	26,447	18–11
30	May 8	@ D'backs 8:40pm	6–1	Westbrook (4–2)	Kennedy (3–2)		30,156	19–11
31	May 9	@ D'backs 8:40pm	7–2	Lohse (5–1)	Miley (3–1)	Motte (6)	27,710	20–11
32	May 11	Braves 7:15pm *	9–7 (12)	Hernández (1–0)	McClellan (0–1)	Kimbrel (11)	45,190	20–12
33	May 12	Braves 6:15pm	7–2	Beachy (4–1)	Wainwright (2–4)		44,157	20–13
34	May 13	Braves 1:15pm	7–4	Hanson (4–3)	Lynn (6–1)		45,729	20–14
35	May 14	Cubs 6:07pm (ESPN)	6–4	Camp (2–1)	Boggs (0–1)	Dolis (4)	44,276	20–15
36	May 15	Cubs 12:45pm	7–6	Motte (2–1)	Dolis (2–3)		45,538	21–15
37	May 16	@ Giants 9:15pm *	4–1	García (3–2)	Bumgarner (5–3)	Motte (7)	41,324	22–15
38	May 17	@ Giants 2:45pm *	7–5	Cain (3–2)	Wainwright (2–5)	Casilla (9)	41,225	22–16
39	May 18	@ Dodgers 9:10pm	6–5	Jansen (3–0)	Salas (0–2)		40,906	22–17
40	May 19	@ Dodgers 9:10pm	6–0	Kershaw (4–1)	Westbrook (4–3)		39,383	22–18
41	May 20	@ Dodgers 7:00pm (ESPN)	6–5	Guerra (2–3)	Rzepczynski (0–2)	Jansen (5)	44,005	22–19
42	May 21	Padres 7:15pm	4–3	Motte (3–1)	Cashner (2–3)		40,360	23–19
43	May 22	Padres 7:15pm	4–0	Wainwright (3–5)	Vólquez (2–4)		39,151	24–19
44	May 23	Padres 7:15pm	6–3	Lynn (7–1)	Suppan (2–3)	Motte (8)	40,715	25–19
45	May 24	Phillies 7:15pm	10–9	Valdés (1–0)	Salas (0–3)	Papelbon (13)	40,135	25–20
46	May 25	Phillies 7:15pm	5–3 (10)	Valdés (2–0)	Motte (3–2)	Papelbon (14)	43,375	25–21
47	May 26	Phillies 6:15pm (Fox)	4–0	Kendrick (1–4)	García (3–3)		44,476	25–22
48	May 27	Phillies 1:15pm	8–3	Wainwright (4–5)	Halladay (4–5)		42,659	26–22
49	May 28	@ Braves 12:10pm	8–2	Lynn (8–1)	Hanson (5–4)		42,126	27–22
50	May 29	@ Braves 6:10pm	5–4	Delgado (3–5)	Westbrook (4–4)	Kimbrel (14)	26,218	27–23
51	May 30	@ Braves 6:10pm	10–7	Venters (3–2)	Rzepczynski (0–3)	Kimbrel (15)	28,474	27–24

June (13-14) (.481)

#	Date	Opponent / Time	Score	Win	Loss	Save	Attendance	Record
52	June 1	@ Mets 6:10pm	8–0	Santana (3–2)	Wainwright (4–6)		27,069	27–25
53	June 2	@ Mets 3:10pm	5–0	Dickey (8–1)	Lynn (8–2)		27,914	27–26
54	June 3	@ Mets 7:05pm (ESPN2)	6–1	Niese (4–2)	Westbrook (4–5)		23,559	27–27
55	June 4	@ Mets 12:10pm	5–4	Rzepczynski (1–3)	Rauch (3–5)	Motte (9)	25,830	28–27
56	June 5	@ Astros 7:05pm	9–8	Harrell (5–4)	García (3–4)	Myers (14)	18,911	28–28
57	June 6	@ Astros 7:05pm	4–3	Wainwright (5–6)	Norris (5–3)	Motte (10)	18,517	29–28
58	June 7	@ Astros 7:05pm	14–2	Lynn (9–2)	Happ (4–6)		22,265	30–28
59	June 8	Indians 7:15pm	6–2	Tomlin (3–3)	Westbrook (4–6)		42,098	30–29
60	June 9	Indians 6:15pm (Fox)	2–0	Lohse (6–1)	Masterson (2–6)	Motte (11)	41,694	31–29
61	June 10	Indians 1:15pm	4–1	Pestano (3–0)	Motte (3–3)	Perez (20)	43,400	31–30
62	June 12	White Sox 7:15pm	6–1	Quintana (2–1)	Wainwright (5–7)		40,972	31–31
63	June 13	White Sox 7:15pm *	1–0	Lynn (10–2)	Peavy (6–2)	Motte (12)	40,045	32–31
64	June 14	White Sox 7:15pm *	5–3	Westbrook (5–6)	Floyd (4–7)	Motte (13)	43,464	33–31
65	June 15	Royals 7:15pm	3–2	Mazzaro (3–1)	Lohse (6–2)	Broxton (16)	42,001	33–32
66	June 16	Royals 1:15pm	10–7	Boggs (1–1)	Collins (4–1)	Motte (14)	42,018	34–32
67	June 17	Royals 1:15pm	5–3 (15)	Broxton (1–1)	Sánchez (0–1)		41,680	34–33
68	June 19	@ Tigers 6:05pm *	6–3	Verlander (7–4)	Lynn (10–3)	Coke (1)	36,733	34–34
69	June 20	@ Tigers 6:05pm *	3–1	Westbrook (6–6)	Porcello (4–5)		38,871	35–34
70	June 21	@ Tigers 12:05pm	2–1 (10)	Benoit (1–1)	Marte (0–1)		40,776	35–35
71	June 22	@ Royals 7:10pm	11–4	Kelly (1–0)	Mazzaro (3–2)		37,902	36–35
72	June 23	@ Royals 1:10pm	8–2	Wainwright (6–7)	Mendoza (2–4)		37,240	37–35
73	June 24	@ Royals 1:10pm	11–8	Marte (1–1)	Collins (4–2)		29,063	38–35
74	June 25	@ Marlins 6:10pm *	8–7 (10)	Marte (2–1)	Gaudin (1–1)	Motte (15)	27,369	39–35
75	June 26	@ Marlins 6:10pm	5–2	Lohse (7–2)	Zambrano (4–6)	Motte (16)	25,444	40–35
76	June 27	@ Marlins 6:10pm	5–3	Sánchez (4–6)	Freeman (0–1)	Bell (15)	28,397	40–36
77	June 29	Pirates 7:15pm	14–5	Correia (4–6)	Wainwright (6–8)		45,382	40–37
78	June 30	Pirates 1:15pm	7–3	Karstens (1–2)	Lynn (10–4)	Hughes (1)	37,162	40–38

July (15-10) (.600)

#	Date	Opponent / Time	Score	Win	Loss	Save	Attendance	Record
79	July 1	Pirates 1:15pm	5–4	Westbrook (7–6)	Bédard (4–9)	Motte (17)	37,821	41–38
80	July 2	Rockies 7:15pm	9–3	Lohse (8–2)	Chatwood (1–1)		39,456	42–38
81	July 3	Rockies 7:15pm	3–2	Francis (2–1)	Kelly (1–1)	Betancourt (13)	41,701	42–39
82	July 4	Rockies 6:15pm	4–1	Wainwright (7–8)	Guthrie (3–8)	Motte (18)	42,338	43–39
83	July 5	Rockies 7:15pm	6–2	Lynn (11–4)	Friedrich (4–6)	Motte (19)	41,751	44–39
84	July 6	Marlins 7:15pm	3–2	Nolasco (8–6)	Westbrook (7–7)	Bell (19)	46,721	44–40
85	July 7	Marlins 1:15pm	3–2	Lohse (9–2)	Zambrano (4–7)	Motte (20)	41,312	45–40
86	July 8	Marlins 1:15pm	5–4	Boggs (2–1)	Bell (2–5)		38,436	46–40
--	July 10	83rd All-Star Game	National League 8, American League 0 (Kansas City, Missouri; Kaufmann Stadium)					
87	July 13	@ Reds 6:10pm	5–3	Simón (1–1)	Wainwright (7–9)	Chapman (12)	40,217	46–41
88	July 14	@ Reds 3:05pm (Fox)	3–2 (10)	LeCure (3–2)	Marte (2–2)		37,583	46–42
89	July 15	@ Reds 7:00pm (ESPN)	4–2	Bailey (8–6)	Westbrook (7–8)	Chapman (13)	39,280	46–43
90	July 16	@ Brewers 7:10pm	3–2	Motte (4–3)	Axford (2–6)		30,128	47–43
91	July 17	@ Brewers 7:10pm	3–2	Wolf (3–6)	Kelly (1–2)	Rodríguez (2)	30,491	47–44
92	July 18	@ Brewers 1:10pm	4–3	Axford (3–6)	Wainwright (7–10)	Rodríguez (3)	37,753	47–45
93	July 20	Cubs 7:15pm	4–1	Lohse (10–2)	Dempster (5–4)	Motte (21)	43,786	48–45
94	July 21	Cubs 6:15pm	12–0	Westbrook (8–8)	Germano (0–1)		43,424	49–45
95	July 22	Cubs 1:15pm	7–0	Lynn (12–4)	Wood (4–5)		42,411	50–45
96	July 23	Dodgers 7:15pm	5–3	Billingsley (5–9)	Kelly (1–3)	Jansen (19)	42,806	50–46
97	July 24	Dodgers 7:15pm *	8–2	Wainwright (8–10)	Kershaw (7–6)		38,195	51–46
98	July 25	Dodgers 7:15pm *	3–2 (12)	Salas (1–3)	Wright (4–3)		37,841	52–46
99	July 26	Dodgers 12:45pm	7–4	Westbrook (9–8)	Capuano (10–6)	Motte (22)	36,607	53–46
100	July 27	@ Cubs 1:20pm	9–6	Lynn (13–4)	Wood (4–6)	Motte (23)	40,778	54–46
101	July 28	@ Cubs 12:05pm	3–2	Russell (4–0)	Kelly (1–4)	Mármol (13)	41,276	54–47
102	July 29	@ Cubs 1:20pm	4–2 (10)	Russell (5–0)	Rosenthal (0–1)		39,534	54–48
103	July 31	@ Rockies 7:40pm	11–6	Lohse (11–2)	Francis (3–3)		31,297	55–48

August (16-13) (.552)

#	Date	Opponent / Time	Score	Win	Loss	Save	Attendance	Record
104	August 1	@ Rockies 7:40pm	9–6	Westbrook (10–8)	Belisle (3–3)		29,547	56–48
105	August 2	@ Rockies 7:40pm	8–2	Brothers (6–2)	Salas (1–4)		29,659	56–49
106	August 3	Brewers 7:15pm *	9–3	Kelly (2–4)	Wolf (3–8)		41,505	57–49
107	August 4	Brewers 6:15pm	6–1	Wainwright (9–10)	Rogers (0–1)		42,036	58–49
108	August 5	Brewers 7:05pm (ESPN)	3–0	Lohse (12–2)	Estrada (0–5)	Motte (24)	40,274	59–49
109	August 6	Giants 7:15pm	8–2	Westbrook (11–8)	Cain (10–5)		38,652	60–49
110	August 7	Giants 7:15pm	4–2	Zito (9–8)	Lynn (13–5)	Affeldt (3)	41,293	60–50
111	August 8	Giants 7:15pm	15–0	Vogelsong (10–5)	Kelly (2–5)		36,906	60–51
112	August 9	Giants 12:45pm	3–1	Wainwright (10–10)	Bumgarner (12–7)	Motte (25)	32,810	61–51
113	August 10	@ Phillies 6:05pm *	3–1	Halladay (6–6)	Browning (0–1)	Papelbon (25)	43,122	61–52
114	August 11	@ Phillies 6:05pm	4–1	Westbrook (12–8)	Lee (2–7)	Motte (26)	44,233	62–52
115	August 12	@ Phillies 12:35pm	8–7 (11)	Horst (1–0)	Browning (0–2)		42,877	62–53
116	August 14	Diamondbacks 7:15pm	8–2	Kelly (3–5)	Kennedy (10–10)		34,587	63–53
117	August 15	Diamondbacks 7:15pm	5–2	Wainwright (11–10)	Saunders (6–9)	Motte (27)	33,572	64–53
118	August 16	Diamondbacks 7:15pm	2–1	Hernandez (2–2)	Motte (4–4)	Putz (23)	36,758	64–54
119	August 17	Pirates 7:15pm	2–1	McDonald (11–5)	Westbrook (12–9)	Hanrahan (34)	38,689	64–55
120	August 18	Pirates 3:05pm (Fox)	5–4	Browning (1–2)	Bédard (7–13)	Motte (28)	40,313	65–55
121	August 19	Pirates 1:15pm	6–3 (19)	Rodríguez (8–12)	Browning (1–3)		43,412	65–56
122	August 21	Astros 7:15pm	7–0	Wainwright (12–10)	Harrell (10–9)		35,370	66–56
123	August 22	Astros 7:15pm	4–2	Lohse (13–2)	Norris (5–11)	Motte (29)	35,198	67–56
124	August 23	Astros 12:45pm	13–5	Westbrook (13–9)	Keuchel (1–6)		30,343	68–56
125	August 24	@ Reds 6:10pm	8–5	Kelly (4–5)	Latos (10–4)	Motte (30)	36,162	69–56
126	August 25	@ Reds 3:05pm (Fox)	8–2	Leake (6–8)	García (3–5)		41,680	69–57
127	August 26	@ Reds 12:10pm	8–2	Wainwright (13–10)	Bailey (10–9)		31,564	70–57
128	August 27	@ Pirates 6:05pm	4–3	Lohse (14–2)	Burnett (15–5)	Motte (31)	16,700	71–57
129	August 28	@ Pirates 6:05pm	9–0	McDonald (12–6)	Westbrook (13–10)		17,492	71–58
130	August 29	@ Pirates 6:05pm (ESPN)	5–0	Rodríguez (9–13)	Kelly (4–6)		19,398	71–59
131	August 30	@ Nationals 6:05pm	8–1	Jackson (8–9)	García (3–6)		23,269	71–60
132	August 31	@ Nationals 6:05pm	10–0	Gonzalez (17–7)	Wainwright (13–11)		29,499	71–61

September (15-12) (.556)

#	Date	Opponent / Time	Score	Win	Loss	Save	Attendance	Record
133	September 1	@ Nationals 3:05pm (Fox)	10–9	Boggs (3–1)	Storen (1–1)	Motte (32)	34,004	72–61
134	September 2	@ Nationals 12:35pm	4–3	Mattheus (5–1)	Lynn (13–6)	Clippard (29)	31,096	72–62
135	September 3	Mets 1:15pm	5–4	Kelly (5–6)	McHugh (0–1)	Motte (33)	40,952	73–62
136	September 4	Mets 7:15pm	5–1	García (4–6)	Harvey (3–4)		34,108	74–62
137	September 5	Mets 12:45pm	6–2	Dickey (18–4)	Wainwright (13–12)		30,090	74–63
138	September 7	Brewers 7:15pm	5–4 (13)	Kintzler (1–0)	Lynn (13–7)	Axford (26)	38,648	74–64
139	September 8	Brewers 6:15pm	6–3	Fiers (9–7)	Westbrook (13–11)	Axford (27)	40,422	74–65
140	September 9	Brewers 1:15pm	5–4 (10)	Lynn (14–7)	Loe (6–5)		39,919	75–65
141	September 10	@ Padres 9:05pm	11–3	Stults (6–2)	García (4–7)		18,081	75–66
142	September 11	@ Padres 9:05pm	6–4	Vólquez (10–10)	Wainwright (13–13)	Gregerson (6)	29,887	75–67
143	September 12	@ Padres 5:35pm	3–2	Richard (13–12)	Lohse (14–3)	Gregerson (7)	16,442	75–68
144	September 13	@ Dodgers 9:10pm	2–1	Lynn (15–7)	Rodriguez (0–1)	Motte (34)	43,309	76–68
145	September 14	@ Dodgers 9:10pm	8–5	Tolleson (2–1)	Rosenthal (0–2)		40,167	76–69
146	September 15	@ Dodgers 8:10pm	4–3	Belisario (6–1)	Motte (4–5)		42,449	76–70
147	September 16	@ Dodgers 3:10pm	5–2 (12)	Miller (1–0)	Ely (0–2)	Motte (35)	35,754	77–70
148	September 18	Astros 7:15pm	4–1	Lohse (15–3)	Abad (0–5)	Motte (36)	35,422	78–70
149	September 19	Astros 7:15pm	5–0	Lynn (16–7)	Harrell (10–10)	Motte (37)	39,062	79–70
150	September 20	Astros 12:45pm	5–4	García (5–7)	Norris (5–13)	Motte (38)	34,788	80–70
151	September 21	@ Cubs 1:20pm	5–4 (11)	Cabrera (1–1)	Kelly (5–7)		29,100	80–71
152	September 22	@ Cubs 12:05pm	5–4 (10)	Boggs (4–1)	Chapman (0–1)	Motte (39)	40,298	81–71
153	September 23	@ Cubs 1:20pm	6–3	Lohse (16–3)	Germano (2–9)	Motte (40)	33,354	82–71
154	September 24	@ Astros 7:05pm	6–1	Lynn (17–7)	Abad (0–6)		12,584	83–71
155	September 25	@ Astros 7:05pm	4–0	García (6–7)	Harrell (10–11)		16,943	84–71
156	September 26	@ Astros 7:05pm	2–0	Norris (6–13)	Carpenter (0–1)	López (8)	18,712	84–72
157	September 28	Nationals 7:15pm	12–2	Wainwright (14–13)	Jackson (9–11)		39,166	85–72
158	September 29	Nationals 6:15pm	6–4 (10)	Storen (3–1)	Freeman (0–2)	Stammen (1)	42,264	85–73
159	September 30	Nationals 1:15pm	10–4	Lynn (18–7)	Detwiler (10–8)		40,084	86–73

OCTOBER (2-1) (.667)

#	Date	Opponent / Time	Score	Win	Loss	Save	Attendance	Record
160	October 1	Reds 7:15pm	4–2	García (7–7)	Arroyo (12–10)	Motte (41)	38,480	87–73
161	October 2	Reds 7:15pm	3–1	Latos (14–4)	Carpenter (0–2)	Chapman (38)	39,644	87–74
162	October 3	Reds 7:15pm	1–0	Marte (3–2)	Broxton (4–5)	Motte (42)	42,509	88–74

==== See also ====
Regular Season Schedule (calendar style)
Regular Season Schedule (sortable text)
National Broadcast Schedule (all teams), EDT

=== Postseason Game Log ===
2012 Postseason Game Log
NLDS (3–2) (.600)

#	Date	Opponent / Time	Score	Win	Loss	Save	Attendance	Record
1	October 7	Nationals	2–3					0–1
2	October 8	Nationals	12–4					1–1
3	October 10	@ Nationals	8–0					2–1
4	October 11	@ Nationals	1–2					2–2
5	October 12	@ Nationals	9–7					3–2

NLCS (3–4) (.429)

#	Date	Opponent / Time	Score	Win	Loss	Save	Attendance	Record
1	October 14	@ Giants	6–4					1–0
2	October 15	@ Giants	1–7					1–1
3	October 17	Giants	3–1					2–1
4	October 18	Giants	8–3					3–1
5	October 19	Giants	0–5					3–2
6	October 21	@ Giants	1–6					3–3
7	October 22	@ Giants	0–9					3–4

=== Cardinals Record When ===
(through October 3, final)

Situation	W-L Record	Pct.
Home	50-31	.617
Away	38-43	.469
Scoring first	58-26	.687
Opponent scores first	30-48	.385
Scoring more than 3 runs	76-19	.800
Scoring 3 runs	7-16	.304
Scoring fewer than 3 runs	5-39	.114
Leading after 7 innings	78-5	.940
Tied after 7 innings	5-12	.294
Trailing after 7 innings	5-57	.081
Leading after 8 innings	80-6	.930
Tied after 8 innings	4-10	.286
Trailing after 8 innings	4-58	.065
In errorless games	52-35	.598
In error-made games	36-39	.480
Out-hit opponents	73-13	.849
Same hits as opponents	4-7	.364
Out-hit by opponents	11-54	.169
Extra innings	6-12	.333
Shutouts	10-11	.476
One-run games	21-26	.447
One or Two-run games	28-43	.394
Monday games	13-4	.765
Tuesday games	14-11	.560
Wednesday games	17-9	.654
Thursday games	8-8	.500
Friday games	9-17	.346
Saturday games	12-14	.462
Sunday games	15-11	.577

Stat	Number	Total	Pct.
Runs via HR	259	765	.339
Opp. Runs via HR	230	648	.355

== Postseason ==
=== Wild Card Game ===
Friday, October 5, 2012

Team	1	2	3	4	5	6	7	8	9	R	H	E
St. Louis Cardinals	0	0	0	3	0	1	2	0	0	6	6	0
Atlanta Braves	0	2	0	0	0	0	1	0	0	3	12	3
WP: Kyle Lohse (1–0) LP: Kris Medlen (0–1) Sv: Jason Motte (1); Home runs: STL: Matt Holliday (1); ATL: David Ross (1)

Time: 3:09 (19 min. delay)
Attendance: 52,631
Official Box Score

=== Division Series ===
==== Game 1, October 7 ====
3:07 p.m. (EDT) at Busch Stadium in St. Louis, Missouri

Team	1	2	3	4	5	6	7	8	9	R	H	E
Washington	0	1	0	0	0	0	0	2	0	3	8	2
St. Louis	0	2	0	0	0	0	0	0	0	2	3	1
WP: Ryan Mattheus (1–0) LP: Mitchell Boggs (0–1) Sv: Drew Storen (1)

==== Game 2, October 8 ====
4:37 p.m. (EDT) at Busch Stadium in St. Louis, Missouri

Team	1	2	3	4	5	6	7	8	9	R	H	E
Washington	0	1	0	0	2	0	1	0	0	4	10	2
St. Louis	0	4	1	2	0	1	0	4	X	12	13	0
WP: Lance Lynn (1–0) LP: Jordan Zimmermann (0–1); Home runs: WSH: Ryan Zimmerman (1), Adam LaRoche (1); STL: Allen Craig (1), Daniel Descalso (1), Carlos Beltrán 2 (2)

==== Game 3, October 10 ====
1:07 p.m. (EDT) at Nationals Park in Washington, D.C.

Team	1	2	3	4	5	6	7	8	9	R	H	E
St. Louis	1	3	0	0	0	1	1	2	0	8	14	1
Washington	0	0	0	0	0	0	0	0	0	0	7	0
WP: Chris Carpenter (1–0) LP: Edwin Jackson (0–1); Home runs: STL: Pete Kozma (1); WSH: None

==== Game 4, October 11 ====
4:07 p.m. (EDT) at Nationals Park in Washington, D.C.

Team	1	2	3	4	5	6	7	8	9	R	H	E
St. Louis	0	0	1	0	0	0	0	0	0	1	3	0
Washington	0	1	0	0	0	0	0	0	1	2	3	1
WP: Drew Storen (1-0) LP: Lance Lynn (1-1); Home runs: STL: None; WSH: Adam LaRoche (2), Jayson Werth (1)

==== Game 5, October 12 ====
8:37 p.m. (EDT) at Nationals Park in Washington, D.C.

Team	1	2	3	4	5	6	7	8	9	R	H	E
St. Louis	0	0	0	1	2	0	1	1	4	9	11	0
Washington	3	0	3	0	0	0	0	1	0	7	11	0
WP: Jason Motte (1–0) LP: Drew Storen (1–1); Home runs: STL: Daniel Descalso (2); WSH: Ryan Zimmerman (2), Bryce Harper (1), Michael Morse (1)

Time: 3:49
Attendance: 45,966
Official Box Score

==== Composite line score ====
2012 NLDS (3–2): St. Louis Cardinals over Washington Nationals

Team	1	2	3	4	5	6	7	8	9	R	H	E
St. Louis Cardinals	1	9	2	3	2	2	2	7	4	32	44	2
Washington Nationals	3	3	3	0	2	0	1	3	1	16	39	5
Total attendance: 228,293 Average attendance: 45,659

=== National League Championship Series ===
==== Game 1 ====
Sunday, October 14, 2012 – 8:15 p.m. (EDT) at AT&T Park in San Francisco, California

Team	1	2	3	4	5	6	7	8	9	R	H	E
St. Louis	0	2	0	4	0	0	0	0	0	6	8	0
San Francisco	0	0	0	4	0	0	0	0	0	4	7	1
WP: Edward Mujica (1–0) LP: Madison Bumgarner (0–1) Sv: Jason Motte (1); Home runs: STL: David Freese (1), Carlos Beltrán (1); SF: None

In Game 1, Carlos Beltrán hit his 14th career postseason homer and David Freese also went deep as the Cardinals took a 6–4 lead over the San Francisco Giants after six innings of the NL championship series opener. Freese hit a two-run homer in the second and Beltrán followed with one in the fourth as the Cardinals knocked out Madison Bumgarner with six runs in 3 2/3 innings.

Bumgarner breezed through a perfect first inning but ran into trouble in the second when Yadier Molina singled on an 0–2 pitch with one out. Freese then drove a 3–2 pitch over the wall in left-center to give the Cardinals a 2–0 lead. That gave Freese 25 career RBIs in the postseason and tied him with Molina for third most ever for the Cardinals. Bumgarner then couldn't make it out of the fourth. Descalso doubled and scored on Pete Kozma's double. Jon Jay added a two-out RBI single and Beltrán ended Bumgarner's night with the homer.

George Kontos got out of the fourth and Tim Lincecum pitched two hitless innings as he once again excelled in his new role out of the bullpen.

Lance Lynn struggled to hold onto that lead in his first postseason start after 10 career relief appearances. After starting the game with three hitless innings, Lynn ran into trouble with two outs and a runner on first in the fourth. Hunter Pence and Brandon Belt followed with singles to drive in San Francisco's first run. They both scored on Gregor Blanco's triple. Brandon Crawford followed with an RBI double to make it 6–4 and Lynn left after walking pinch-hitter Aubrey Huff. Joe Kelly got out of the jam when second baseman Daniel Descalso made a diving stop of Ángel Pagán's grounder up the middle.

No runs were scored for the remainder of the contest.

==== Game 2 ====
Monday, October 15, 2012 – 8:07 p.m. (EDT) at AT&T Park in San Francisco, California

Team	1	2	3	4	5	6	7	8	9	R	H	E
St. Louis	0	1	0	0	0	0	0	0	0	1	5	2
San Francisco	1	0	0	4	0	0	0	2	X	7	12	0
WP: Ryan Vogelsong (1–0) LP: Chris Carpenter (0–1); Home runs: STL: None; SF: Ángel Pagán (1)

==== Game 3 ====
Wednesday, October 17, 2012 – 4:07 p.m. (EDT) at Busch Stadium in St. Louis, Missouri

Team	1	2	3	4	5	6	7	8	9	R	H	E
San Francisco	0	0	1	0	0	0	0	0	0	1	9	1
St. Louis	0	0	2	0	0	0	1	0	X	3	6	0
WP: Kyle Lohse (1–0) LP: Matt Cain (0–1) Sv: Jason Motte (2); Home runs: SF: None; STL: Matt Carpenter (1)

A 3-hour 28 min rain delay was longer than the time of the game itself at 3:02.

==== Game 4 ====
Thursday, October 18, 2012 – 8:07 p.m. (EDT) at Busch Stadium in St. Louis, Missouri

Team	1	2	3	4	5	6	7	8	9	R	H	E
San Francisco	0	1	0	0	0	0	0	0	2	3	6	1
St. Louis	2	0	0	0	2	2	2	0	X	8	12	0
WP: Adam Wainwright (1-0) LP: Tim Lincecum (0-1); Home runs: SF: Hunter Pence (1), Pablo Sandoval (1); STL: None

The second-largest crowd of the year 47,062 saw the Cardinals win, 8-3. Adam Wainwright went seven strong innings, giving up only four hits and one run, the home run to Hunter Pence, walking none and striking out five.

==== Game 5 ====
Friday, October 19, 2012 – 8:07 p.m. (EDT) at Busch Stadium in St. Louis, Missouri

Team	1	2	3	4	5	6	7	8	9	R	H	E
San Francisco	0	0	0	4	0	0	0	1	0	5	6	0
St. Louis	0	0	0	0	0	0	0	0	0	0	7	1
WP: Barry Zito (1–0) LP: Lance Lynn (0–1); Home runs: SF: Pablo Sandoval (2); STL: None

==== Game 6 ====
Sunday, October 21, 2012 – 7:45 p.m. (EDT) at AT&T Park in San Francisco, California

Team	1	2	3	4	5	6	7	8	9	R	H	E
St. Louis	0	0	0	0	0	1	0	0	0	1	5	1
San Francisco	1	4	0	0	0	0	0	1	X	6	9	1
WP: Ryan Vogelsong (2–0) LP: Chris Carpenter (0–2)

==== Game 7 ====
Monday, October 22, 2012 – 8:07 p.m. (EDT) at AT&T Park in San Francisco, California

Team	1	2	3	4	5	6	7	8	9	R	H	E
St. Louis	0	0	0	0	0	0	0	0	0	0	7	2
San Francisco	1	1	5	0	0	0	1	1	X	9	14	0
WP: Matt Cain (1–1) LP: Kyle Lohse (1–1); Home runs: STL: None; SF: Brandon Belt (1)

==== Composite line score ====
2012 NLCS (4–3): San Francisco Giants over St. Louis Cardinals

Team	1	2	3	4	5	6	7	8	9	R	H	E
St. Louis Cardinals	2	3	2	4	2	3	3	0	0	19	50	6
San Francisco Giants	3	6	6	12	0	0	1	5	2	35	63	4
Total attendance: 311,326 Average attendance: 44,475

== Farm system ==
Level	Team	League	Manager
AAA	Memphis Redbirds	Pacific Coast League	Ron Warner
AA	Springfield Cardinals	Texas League	Mike Shildt
A	Palm Beach Cardinals	Florida State League	Johnny Rodríguez
A	Quad Cities River Bandits	Midwest League	Luis Aguayo
A-Short Season	Batavia Muckdogs	New York–Penn League	Dann Bilardello
Rookie	Johnson City Cardinals	Appalachian League	Oliver Marmol
Rookie	GCL Cardinals	Gulf Coast League	Steve Turco

LEAGUE CHAMPIONS: Springfield

=== Draft selections ===
St. Louis Cardinals 2012 Draft Selections
