= Barrett Browning =

Barrett Browning may refer to:

- Misspelling for Barret Browning (1984–), American baseball player
- Misconstructions as a surname within the family of English poet Robert Browning:
  - Elizabeth Barrett Browning (1806–1861), poet wife of the poet
  - Robert Barrett Browning (1849–1912), painter son of the two poets

== See also ==
- Robert Browning (1812–1889), poet whose wife and son each used "Barrett" as a middle name
