= Bryan Anderson (baseball) =

American baseball player (born 1986)

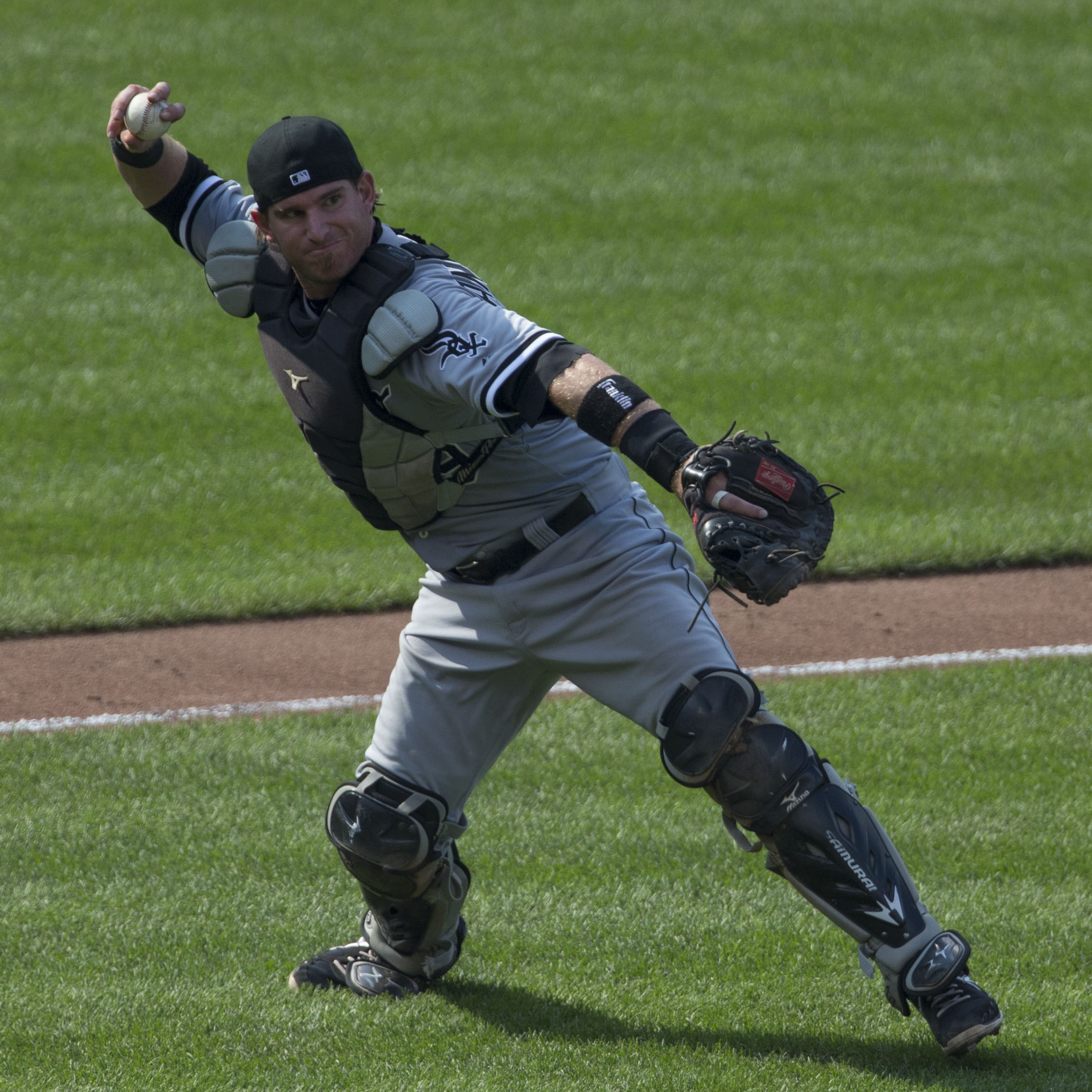
- Anderson with the Chicago White Sox
- Catcher
- Born: December 16, 1986 (age 39); Thousand Oaks, California, U.S.
- Batted: Left Threw: Right

MLB debut
- April 15, 2010, for the St. Louis Cardinals

Last MLB appearance
- October 4, 2015, for the Oakland Athletics

MLB statistics
- Batting average: .221
- Home runs: 0
- Runs batted in: 7
- Stats at Baseball Reference

Teams
- St. Louis Cardinals (2010, 2012); Chicago White Sox (2013); Oakland Athletics (2014–2015)
Medals
Men's baseball
Representing United States
Baseball World Cup
Gold medal – first place	2007 Tianmu	National team

Bryan Douglas Anderson (born December 16, 1986) is an American former professional baseball catcher. He played in Major League Baseball (MLB) for the St. Louis Cardinals, Chicago White Sox, and Oakland Athletics, and in international competition for the United States national baseball team.

== Career ==
=== St. Louis Cardinals ===
Anderson was born in Thousand Oaks, California, on December 16, 1986. He attended Simi Valley High School in Simi Valley, California. The Cardinals selected him in the fourth round (140th overall) of the June 2005 First-Year Player Draft.

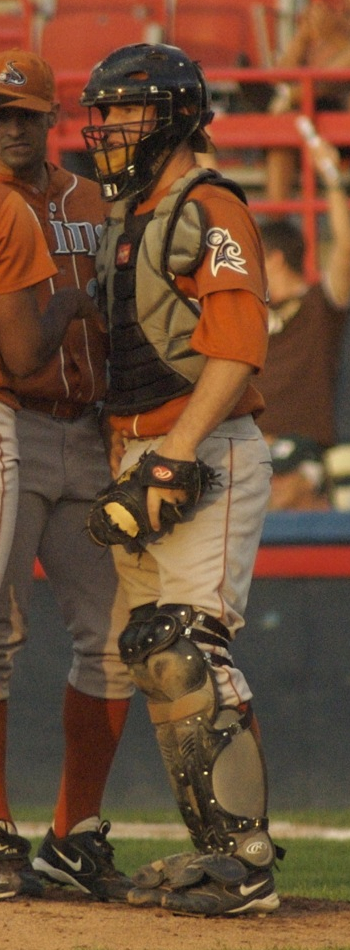
Anderson playing for the Swing of the Quad Cities in 2006

Following the draft, Anderson was assigned to big league camp and was one of the youngest non-roster invitees in the organization history. He was then assigned to the Johnson City Cardinals, the Cardinals's rookie league team in the Appalachian League. He played 51 games in 2005 for Johnson City and hit .331. In 2006, he began with the Single-A Quad Cities River Bandits in the Midwest League. He played the full year and batted .302. In 2007, he was advanced to the Springfield Cardinals, the Double-A affiliate in Missouri of the Texas League. He did very well and hit .298. He began 2008 in Springfield, hitting .388 with two homers and 14 RBIs in April. He was then promoted to the Triple-A Memphis Redbirds of Pacific Coast League (PCL). He spent 2009 in Memphis as well, and many argue he should have been given a spot on the big league roster.

In 2010, Anderson was a non-roster invitee to Cardinals spring training. On March 15 he was optioned to Memphis.

In April 2010, Anderson was recalled from Memphis when back up catcher Jason LaRue was placed on the 15-day disabled list. He made his Major League debut on April 15, 2010. He saw limited action, appearing in 4 games, and was reassigned to Memphis on April 27 when LaRue was reactivated.

Anderson battled Tony Cruz during spring training for the backup catcher for the Major League Cardinals. He ended up starting the season at Triple-A Memphis, under trade speculation as he was a hot commodity and on many trade table talks, but remained in Memphis and was eventually called up to the big league club during the summer. Anderson went 3-for-12 in limited at-bats for St. Louis, while batting .255 in one hundred plate appearances for Memphis. In November, 2012 St. Louis cleared space on the 40-man off season roster by outrighting Anderson and two others back to Memphis. He subsequently elected to become a free agent, which allowed him to search for teams that could possible offer an immediate big league job.

=== Chicago White Sox ===
On November 21, 2012, relatively early in the off season, Anderson signed a minor league deal with the Chicago White Sox. He was called up to the big leagues to serve as a split time catcher. On October 4, 2013, Anderson was removed from the 40-man roster and sent outright to the Triple-A Charlotte Knights. He subsequently elected to become a free agent.

=== Cincinnati Reds ===
On January 29, 2014, Anderson signed a minor league contract with the Cincinnati Reds organization. He made 21 appearances for the Double-A Pensacola Blue Wahoos, hitting .343/.427/.643 with five home runs and 19 RBI; he also slashed .302/.380/.481 with five home runs and 24 RBI in 52 games for the Triple-A Louisville Bats.

=== Oakland Athletics ===
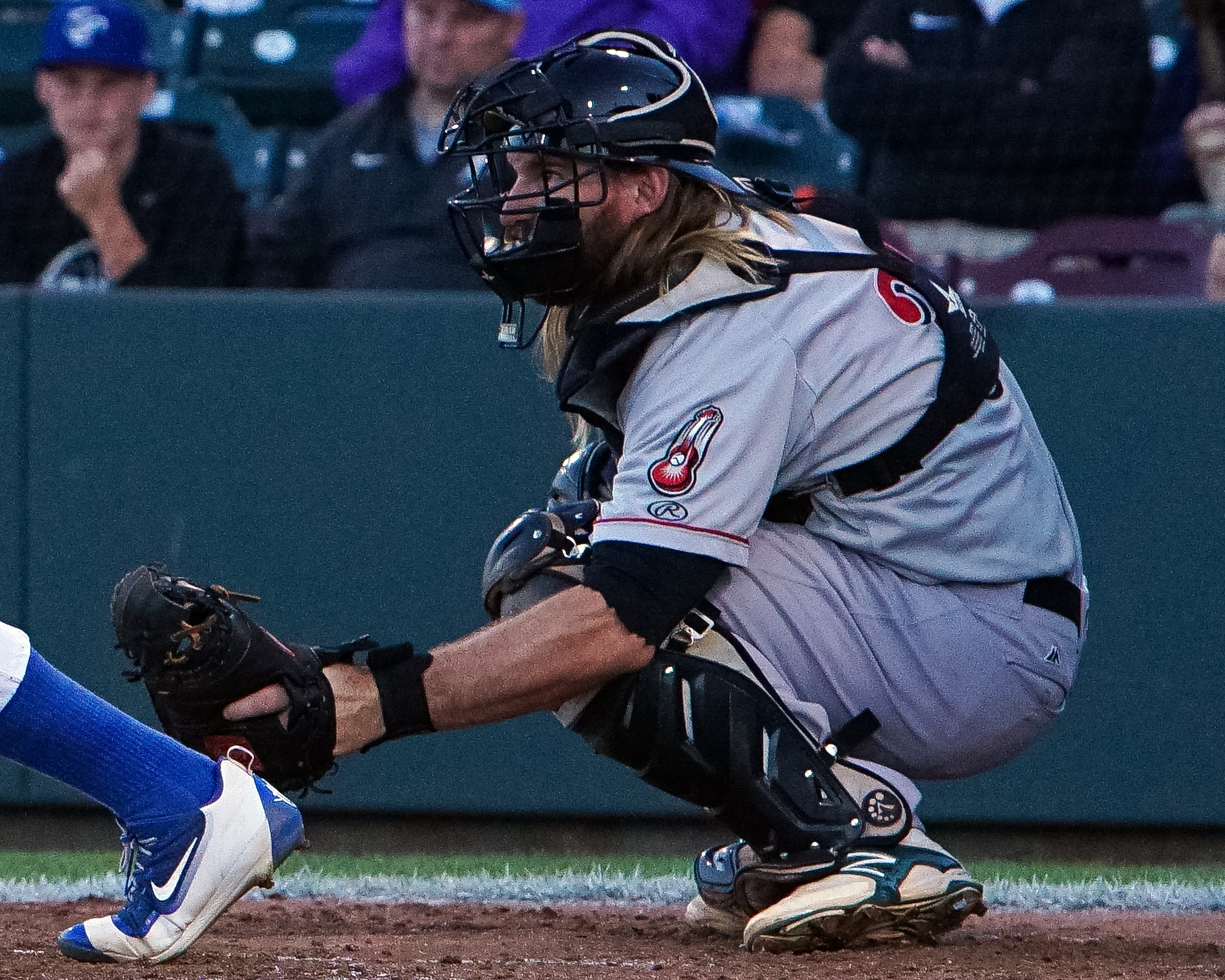
Anderson playing for the Nashville Sounds in 2016

The Reds traded Anderson to the Oakland Athletics on August 24, 2014. On September 1, Anderson was recalled to Oakland, where he spent the remainder of the campaign.

Anderson played the majority of the 2015 season with the Triple-A Nashville Sounds, but was called up to Oakland during the summer. He was outrighted back to Nashville after the season, and later elected free agency.

On February 17, 2016, Anderson re–signed with the Athletics on a minor league contract. He played in 41 games split between Nashville and the Double–A Midland RockHounds, hitting a cumulative .210/.270/.362 with three home runs and 17 RBI. Anderson elected free agency following the season on November 7.

== Personal ==
Bryan married his wife, Rachel, in 2014 and they have one daughter. Rachel is a former pediatric nurse from Cleveland, Ohio.
