= Erik Komatsu =

American baseball player (born 1987)

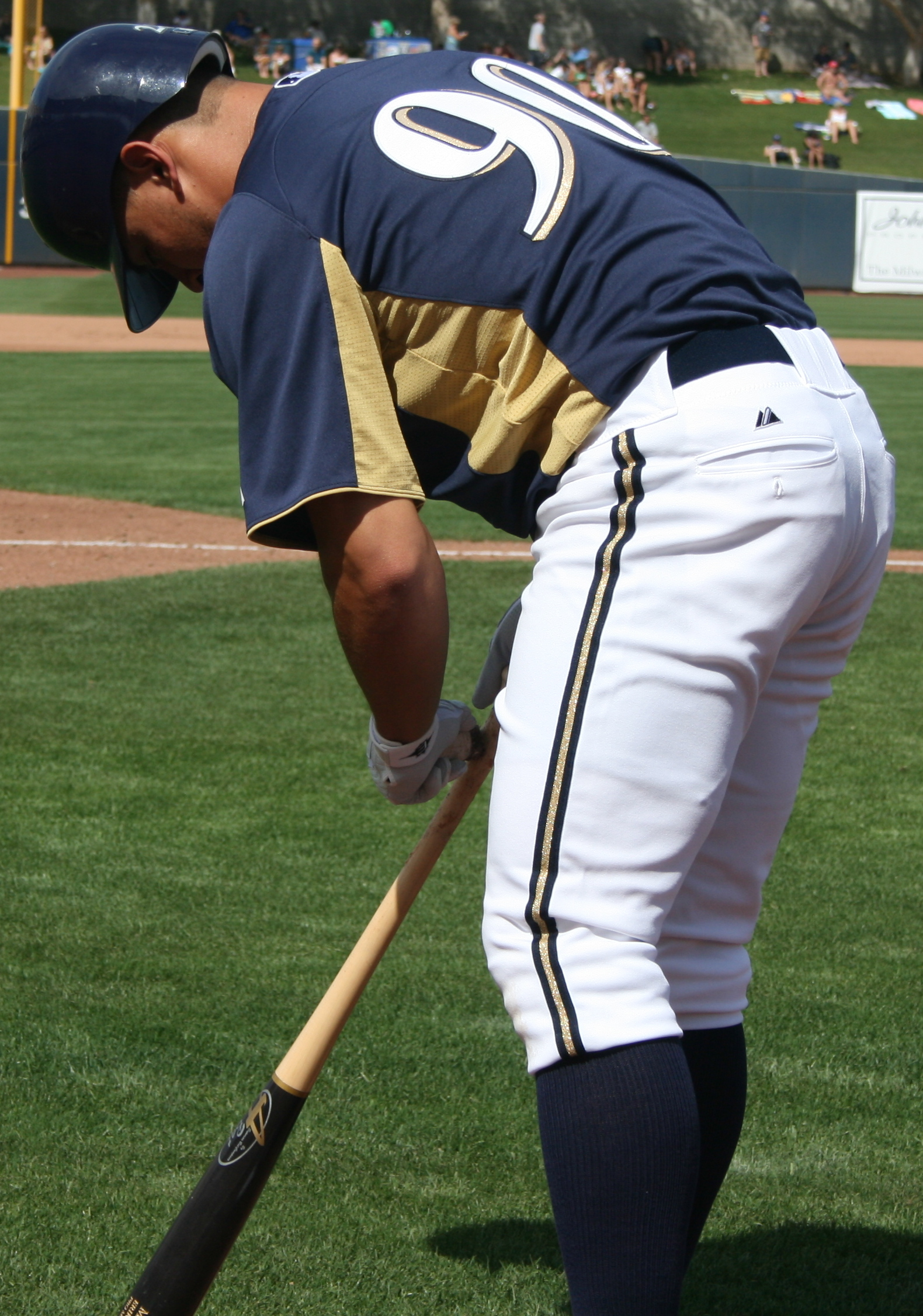
- Komatsu with the Milwaukee Brewers during spring training in 2011
- Outfielder
- Born: October 1, 1987 (age 39); Camarillo, California, U.S.
- Batted: Left Threw: Left

MLB debut
- April 6, 2012, for the St. Louis Cardinals

Last appearance
- May 22, 2012, for the Minnesota Twins

MLB statistics
- Batting average: .216
- Home runs: 0
- Runs batted in: 1
- Stats at Baseball Reference

Teams
- St. Louis Cardinals (2012); Minnesota Twins (2012)

Erik Jordan Komatsu (born October 1, 1987) is an American former professional baseball outfielder. He played in Major League Baseball (MLB) for the St. Louis Cardinals and Minnesota Twins.

== Career ==
After graduating from Adolfo Camarillo High School, Komatsu played college baseball for Cal State Fullerton, Oxnard College and Vanguard University of Southern California.

=== New York Yankees ===
In 2007 Komatsu was drafted by the New York Yankees, but did not sign.

=== Milwaukee Brewers ===
In 2008, Komatsu was signed by the Milwaukee Brewers. He climbed his way from the Rookie League to AA in three years. He was named the Brewers' Minor League Player of the Year in 2010 after slashing .323/.413/.442 with five home runs, 63 RBIs, and 28 stolen bases over 130 games with the Brevard County Manatees.

=== Washington Nationals ===
In 2011, Komatsu first played for the Huntsville Stars and mid-year began playing for the Harrisburg Senators after he was traded from the Brewers to the Washington Nationals for Jerry Hairston, Jr.

=== St. Louis Cardinals ===
Komatsu was chosen by the Cardinals in the minor league phase of the 2011 Rule 5 draft. On April 6, 2012, Komatsu collected an infield hit in first Major League at-bat against the Milwaukee Brewers. As a Rule 5 draft pick, he was designated for assignment after Allen Craig came off the disabled list on May 1. In 15 games with the Cardinals, he collected four hits 19 at bats with three runs and two walks.

=== Minnesota Twins ===
The Minnesota Twins claimed Komatsu off waivers on May 4. On May 7, Komatsu got his first Twins hit against Jered Weaver of the Angels. On May 27, the Twins designated Komatsu for assignment to make room for Jeff Manship.

=== Second stint with Nationals ===
Komatsu was returned to the Nationals organization two days later. In 15 games with the Twins, he amassed seven hits in 32 AB with two runs and an RBI.

Playing with Triple-A Syracuse after being returned, he was placed on the disabled list with an injury on July 7 and missed the rest of the season. In 31 games with Syracuse, he hit .269 with three HR and 14 RBI. Komatsu began 2013 on the disabled list, and made his season debut on April 23 with Harrisburg. After seven games with the Senators, he was promoted to Syracuse on May 2, where he played in nine games before being placed on the disabled list on May 14. In 16 games in 2013, he collected nine hits in 54 AB with one RBI and six walks.

=== Los Angeles Angels of Anaheim ===
Komatsu signed a minor league deal with the Los Angeles Angels of Anaheim in May 2014.

=== Second stint with Brewers ===
Komatsu signed a minor league deal with the Milwaukee Brewers on June 27, 2014.

== Personal life ==
Komatsu was born and raised in California and is of Japanese descent; his paternal grandmother came to the U.S. from Japan as a military bride.

== See also ==
- Rule 5 draft results
