= Joe Kelly (pitcher) =

American baseball player (born 1988)

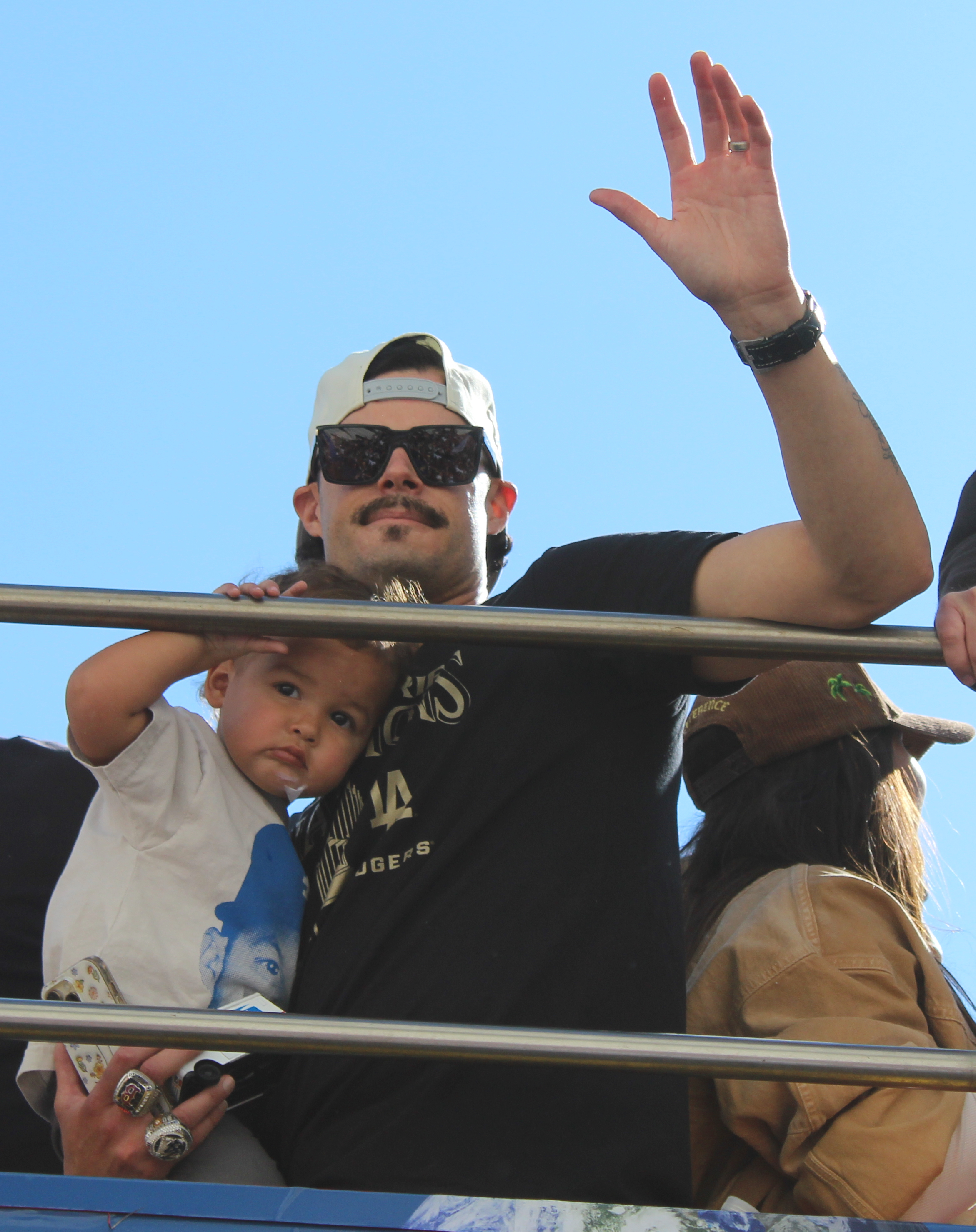
- Kelly at the 2024 World Series championship parade
- Pitcher
- Born: June 9, 1988 (age 38); Anaheim, California, U.S.
- Batted: Right Threw: Right

MLB debut
- June 10, 2012, for the St. Louis Cardinals

Last MLB appearance
- September 27, 2024, for the Los Angeles Dodgers

MLB statistics
- Win–loss record: 54–38
- Earned run average: 3.98
- Strikeouts: 767
- Stats at Baseball Reference

Teams
- St. Louis Cardinals (2012–2014); Boston Red Sox (2014–2018); Los Angeles Dodgers (2019–2021); Chicago White Sox (2022–2023); Los Angeles Dodgers (2023–2024)

Career highlights and awards
- 2× World Series champion (2018, 2020)
Medals
Men's baseball
Representing United States
Pan American Games
| Silver medal – second place | 2007 Rio de Janeiro | Team |

Joseph William Kelly Jr. (born June 9, 1988) is an American former professional baseball pitcher. He played in Major League Baseball (MLB) for the St. Louis Cardinals, Boston Red Sox, Los Angeles Dodgers, and Chicago White Sox. He played college baseball for the UC Riverside Highlanders, where he served as both a starter and a reliever. The Cardinals drafted Kelly in the third round of the 2009 MLB draft. Listed at 6 feet 1 inch (1.85 m) and 190 pounds (86 kg), Kelly batted and threw right-handed. He won the World Series in 2018 and 2020 with the Red Sox and Dodgers, respectively.

Kelly gained publicity for his comical repertoire, such as dancing in the outfield during practice, disguising himself while interviewing the unwitting rapper Nelly, engaging in a lengthy staredown with Dodgers outfielder Scott Van Slyke before a 2013 National League Championship Series game, and wearing a charro jacket to the White House. In 2020, Kelly's mocking of Carlos Correa complaining about a near hit by pitch became a popular online meme.

== Early life and amateur career ==
Kelly is the son of former football player, Joe Kelly Sr. His father played college football for the Vanderbilt Commodores, and professionally for Los Angeles Cobras of the Arena Football League (AFL), as well as a brief stint with the San Diego Chargers of the National Football League (NFL). Kelly was born in Anaheim, California, and attended Corona High School in Corona, California. After high school, he attended the University of California, Riverside (UCR), and played college baseball for the Highlanders team. An outfielder in high school, he converted to pitcher in college and served as the closer. He was named Big West Conference Pitcher of the Year in 2007 as a freshman. After his sophomore season in 2008, he played collegiate summer baseball for the Yarmouth–Dennis Red Sox of the Cape Cod Baseball League. In 2009, Kelly posted a 5.65 earned run average (ERA) with a 1–1 win–loss record. Kelly set a Highlanders record with 24 career saves and was named an All-American. His final career stats at UCR included a 4.65 ERA and an 8–11 record in 42 career games.

== Professional career ==
=== Minor leagues (2009–2012) ===
The St. Louis Cardinals selected Kelly in the third round of the 2009 MLB draft and signed him on June 15 for $341,000. Kelly made his professional baseball debut with the Batavia Muckdogs of the Low-A New York–Penn League, where he appeared in 16 games (two starts), posting a 4.75 ERA with 30 strikeouts in 30 1/3 innings pitched.

In 2010, the Cardinals mainly used Kelly as a starting pitcher with the Single-A Quad Cities River Bandits to get him more innings and develop his secondary pitches. He succeeded in the role and remained a starter. For the season, Kelly appeared in 26 games (18 starts) and pitched 103 1/3 innings while registering 92 strikeouts and 45 walks with a 4.62 ERA and 6–8 record.

In 2011, Kelly pitched for the High-A Palm Beach Cardinals of the Florida State League and then the Double-A Springfield Cardinals of the Texas League. Combined, Kelly appeared in 23 games (22 starts) and pitched 132 innings, recording 113 strikeouts and 59 walks with an 11–6 record and 3.68 ERA. In 2012, with the Triple-A Memphis Redbirds, he posted a 2.86 ERA in 12 games (all starts).

=== St. Louis Cardinals (2012–2014) ===
==== 2012 ====
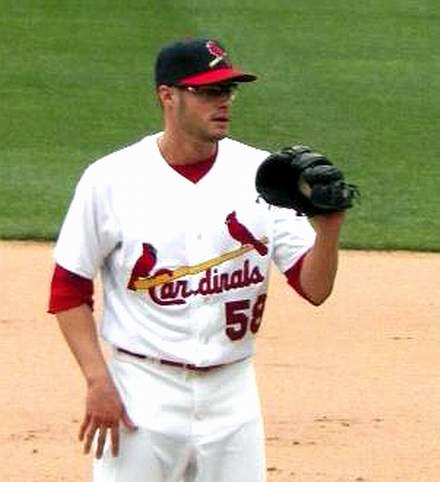
Kelly pitching for the St. Louis Cardinals in 2012

Kelly made his MLB debut on June 10, 2012 replacing the injured Jaime García in the Cardinals' starting rotation. Kelly pitched seven innings in his MLB debut, against the Cleveland Indians, allowing seven hits and one run while striking out four batters; he received a no decision in the game. His first MLB strikeout was of Carlos Santana. Once García returned to the rotation, Kelly moved to a bullpen role; however, he impressed team officials so much they considered keeping him in the rotation and moving Lance Lynn to the bullpen. Overall for the 2012 Cardinals, Kelly appeared in 24 games (16 starts) while compiling a 5–7 record, with a 3.53 ERA and 75 strikeouts in 107 innings pitched.

Kelly's first MLB postseason series was the 2012 National League Division Series, against the Washington Nationals. He appeared in three games and pitched 3 2/3 innings of relief without giving up a run or a hit; he walked one batter and struck out three batters. The Cardinals then advanced to the 2012 NLCS against the San Francisco Giants. In the deciding Game 7, Kelly came on to pitch in the third inning with the Giants ahead 2–0 with the bases loaded and no outs; he gave up two hits and two walks, lasting just 2/3 of an inning, and exited with the Giants ahead 7–0, in a game they would go on to win 9–0. Overall, Kelly made four appearances in the series, pitching a total of four innings in relief; he gave up six hits and was charged with two earned runs, while walking three batters and striking out two batters.

==== 2013 ====
After spring training in 2013, Kelly lost his rotation spot to rookie Shelby Miller and was relegated to the bullpen for much of the first half of the season, seeing little use. However, he became known somewhat as a "stopper" after being reinserted into the rotation to increase its effectiveness. In August, Kelly went 5–0 with a 2.08 ERA. He stranded 83.3% of baserunners as a reliever, and 82% as a starter. He won all three of his starts against the Pittsburgh Pirates, who finished the season three games behind the Cardinals. During the 2013 Cardinals regular season, Kelly had 37 appearances (15 starts), registering a 10–5 record and 2.69 ERA, with 79 strikeouts in 124 innings pitched.

On October 6, Kelly made his first postseason start against the Pirates in the 2013 National League Division Series, receiving a no decision in Game 3. He had the same result in Game 1 of the NLCS, followed by a loss to the Los Angeles Dodgers in Game 5.

In Game 6, Kelly and Dodgers outfielder Scott Van Slyke created a stir before the first pitch by engaging in a lengthy staredown. Both men remained on the field after the conclusion of "The Star-Spangled Banner," long after the rest of their teammates departed the field to await the start of the game. They maintained their positions with hats over their chests through the ground crew's preparation of the field and starting pitcher Michael Wacha's warmup pitches. A total of about 15 minutes passed before the annoyed home plate umpire, Greg Gibson, motioned to both players. Both claimed "victory", as Kelly had smiled first, and Van Slyke had first moved from his position.

Kelly made his first World Series start in Game 3, against the Boston Red Sox. He received a no decision in a 5–4 Cardinals win, pitching 5 1/3 innings while allowing two hits and two runs, striking out six batters and walking three batters.

==== 2014 ====
Kelly won his 2014 debut on April 5 after the Cardinals defeated the Pittsburgh Pirates, 6–1, despite allowing 10 base runners in 5 1/3 innings. He also doubled off opposing starter Francisco Liriano for his first hit of the season. He suffered a hamstring strain in his second start on April 14 and spent three months on the disabled list, before returning on July 11. During the 2014 season, Kelly appeared in seven games (all starts) for the Cardinals, pitching 35 innings and compiling a 2–2 record with 4.37 ERA

Overall, in parts of three seasons with St. Louis, Kelly compiled a 17–14 record with 3.25 ERA and 179 strikeouts over 266 innings pitched in 68 games (38 starts).

=== Boston Red Sox (2014–2018) ===
==== 2014 ====
On July 31, 2014, Kelly was traded to the Boston Red Sox along with first baseman/outfielder Allen Craig for starting pitcher John Lackey and minor league pitcher Corey Littrell. In ten starts for Boston, during August and September, Kelly went 4–2 with a 4.11 ERA while striking out 41 and allowing 32 walks in 61 1/3 innings.

==== 2015 ====
In January 2015, Kelly made a guarantee to the Boston media that he would win the AL Cy Young Award the following season. However, he was injured in a spring training game and began the season on the disabled list.

Through his first 15 starts, he suffered through his worst season in the majors, going 2–6 with a 5.74 ERA. However, in an August resurgence, he won all six starts, including a 3–1 win over the New York Mets on August 29, making him the first Red Sox pitcher since Pedro Martínez to record six wins in one month. He lowered his ERA to 4.94 in August. Kelly was shut down after September 15 due to injury. He finished the season 10–6 in 25 starts for the season with a 4.82 ERA.

==== 2016 ====
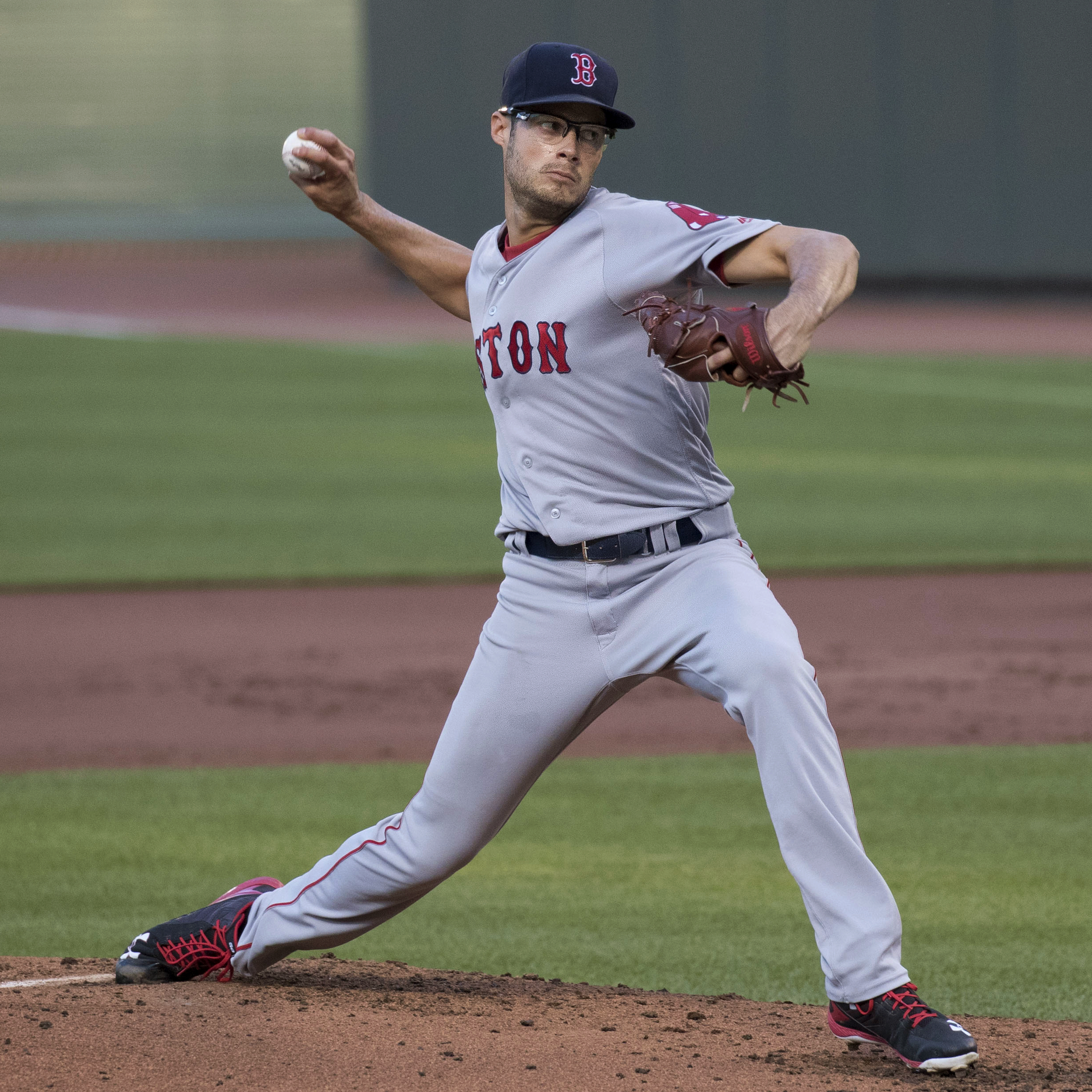
Kelly pitching for the Boston Red Sox in 2016

Early in the 2016 season, the Red Sox placed Kelly on the disabled list on April 20 with a right shoulder impingement. In his return on May 21, he took a no-hitter through 6 2/3 innings against the Cleveland Indians. However, Kelly pitched only 4 2/3 and 2 1/3 innings in his next two starts. By the end of the 2016 season, after spending time with the Triple-A Pawtucket Red Sox, Kelly's role with Boston was as a relief pitcher. He ended the 2016 regular season with 20 MLB appearances (six starts) with an ERA of 5.18 and a record of 4–0.

In his new relief role, Kelly made three appearances in the 2016 American League Division Series. He pitched a total of 3 2/3 innings, retiring all 11 batters he faced including three strikeouts.

==== 2017 ====
For the 2017 season, Kelly continued his role as a member of the Red Sox bullpen. During the regular season he made 54 appearances, all in relief, compiling a 2.79 ERA with 4–1 record in 58 innings pitched; he had 52 strikeouts and issued 27 walks. His fastest pitch of 2017 was 102.2 miles per hour, third-best in MLB only to pitches by Aroldis Chapman and Felipe Vázquez. His two-seam and four-seam fastballs had the second-and third-highest average speeds of any MLB pitcher's pitches in 2017, at 98.9 mph.

In the 2017 American League Division Series, Kelly pitched in two of the series' four games, allowing no walks and four hits with one strikeout in 2 2/3 innings of scoreless relief.

==== 2018 ====
Early in the 2018 season, in an April 11 game against the New York Yankees at Fenway Park, Kelly hit Tyler Austin with a pitch, following a slide by Austin in which he was accused of spiking infielder Brock Holt. Austin charged Kelly and started a bench-clearing brawl; four players, including Kelly, were ejected. This was Kelly's first career ejection. On April 12, Kelly was suspended by MLB for six games and fined an undisclosed amount. During his suspension, Kelly watched a game from the bleacher seats at Fenway Park. He appeared in a career high 73 games for the Red Sox, finishing with a 4.39 ERA in 65 2/3 innings. In the postseason, Kelly made nine appearances, pitching 11 1/3 innings while allowing one earned run and striking out 13. He was the winning pitcher, in relief, of Game 4 of the World Series, as the Red Sox defeated the Los Angeles Dodgers in five games.

=== Los Angeles Dodgers (2019–2021) ===
On December 21, 2018, Kelly signed a three-year, $27 million, contract with the Los Angeles Dodgers. The contract included a $12 million option for a fourth year. Kelly struggled in the early part of the season for the Dodgers and had an 8.35 ERA on June 1, causing him to be booed by the homefield fans. However, after tweaking his delivery he became one of the team's primary bullpen weapons the rest of the season, posting a 3.15 ERA in the second half of the season.

He finished 2019 with a 5–4 record and one save, and a 4.56 ERA in 55 relief appearances, in which he struck out 62 batters in 51 1/3 innings. In Game 5 of the National League Division Series, Kelly gave up a 10th inning grand slam to Howie Kendrick, and was tagged with the loss.

On July 29, 2020, Kelly was issued an eight-game suspension after throwing at Alex Bregman and Carlos Correa of the Houston Astros and inciting a bench clearing altercation after a strikeout of Correa. He appeared in 12 games in the pandemic shortened 2020 season and allowed two earned runs in 10 innings. He appeared in five games in the postseason, including two in the 2020 World Series against the Tampa Bay Rays. He allowed only one run in 3 2/3 innings as the Dodgers won the championship.

In 2021, Kelly pitched in 48 games for the Dodgers with a 2.86 ERA, two saves and 50 strikeouts in 44 innings. In the postseason, he pitched 5 1/3 innings over seven games through the Wild Card Game, NLDS and NLCS, allowing three runs on five hits. While appearing as an opener in Game 5 of the NLCS, he suffered a right biceps strain that shut him down for the rest of the playoffs. On November 6, 2021, the Dodgers declined the 2022 option on Kelly, making him a free agent.

=== Chicago White Sox (2022–2023) ===
On March 14, 2022, Kelly signed a two-year, $17 million contract with a club option for the 2024 season with the Chicago White Sox. Kelly struggled in his first year with the White Sox, going 1–3 with a career worst 6.08 ERA in 43 games in 37 innings while striking out 53 batters. In the 2023 season, he made 31 appearances (29 innings) for the Sox, with a 1–5 record and 4.97 ERA.

=== Second stint with Dodgers (2023–2024) ===
On July 28, 2023, Kelly and Lance Lynn were traded to the Dodgers for Trayce Thompson, Nick Nastrini, and Jordan Leasure. He pitched in 11 games down the stretch for Los Angeles, posting a 1.74 ERA with 19 strikeouts. The Dodgers declined the option on Kelly's contract, paying him a $1 million buyout rather than guaranteeing him a salary of $9.5 million for the 2024 season.

Before the 2024 season, Kelly's wife Ashley offered to give his number 17 to free agent Shohei Ohtani as part of a campaign to encourage Ohtani to sign with the Dodgers. Ohtani had worn number 17 his entire MLB career, which had previously been with the Los Angeles Angels. Kelly later said, "I wasn't going to give it up to just anybody. If Shohei keeps performing, he'll be a future Hall of Famer and I'll be able to have my number retired. That's the closest I'll get to the Hall of Fame." Ohtani gifted Ashley a Porsche in return.

On December 11, 2023, Kelly re-signed with the team on a one–year, $8 million contract. He posted a 4.73 ERA in 15 games before he was placed on the injured list with a right shoulder posterior strain on May 6, 2024, from which he was activated on July 19. He finished the season with a 1–1 record, 4.78 ERA, and 35 strikeouts in 35 games. The Dodgers won the 2024 World Series, and although Kelly was not on the team's postseason roster, he still received a World Series ring.

During the offseason, Kelly commented that he would only return to the Dodgers and would otherwise retire. In an interview in August 2025, Kelly revealed his comeback plan was to pitch a showcase for the Dodgers in hopes of signing with them before season's end.

On December 22, 2025, Kelly announced the end of his playing career. Kelly intentionally did not use the term “retire”, as he believes that term should be reserved for members of the military or those who work until age 65.

== Pitching profile ==
Kelly throws a fastball that can reach up to 102.2 miles per hour (164.5 km/h) and complements it with a sinking fastball and slider. His sinker shows dramatic horizontal movement, while paradoxically, not showing the kind of vertical movement (sink or drop) of other sinkerballers such as former teammate Justin Masterson – and is one of the fastest in the game, at about 98 miles per hour (158 km/h). He also throws a changeup to left-handed batters and a curveball. His control of his pitches — including his fastball — receives compliments.

== Awards ==
Minor leagues

- Florida State League All-Star, mid-season, 2011
- The Cardinal Nation/Scout.com Top Prospect 2011 #27
- Midwest League Pitcher of the Week: July 26 – August 2, 2010
- The Cardinal Nation/Scout.com Top Cardinals Prospect 2010: #32

International

- Silver medal, United States, Pan American Games, 2007

College

- Big West Conference Pitcher of the Year, 2009
- Preseason All-American Third Team, 2009
- Big West Conference Pitcher of the Year, 2007

== Personal life ==
Kelly shared a condominium for a time with Shelby Miller, with whom he competed for a rotation spot during spring training 2013. Kelly married Ashley Parks, daughter of former Minnesota Twins catcher Derek Parks, in November 2013. Kelly met his wife while attending UCR. They have three sons and a daughter. He and his family reside in Rancho Cucamonga, California.

Kelly has showcased his jocular side on occasions besides the 2013 NLCS. While rapper Nelly, a self-professed Cardinals fan and "unofficial mayor" of St. Louis, interviewed with Fox Sports Midwest's Jim Hayes before a game in 2013 featuring his bobblehead giveaway, Hayes welcomed "an older member of the Cardinals organization" to participate. This older member was Kelly wearing a mask of a bald, elderly man. Nelly never guessed it was a prank until Kelly revealed himself after the interview.

Kelly's mother, Andrea Valencia, is Mexican-American. Earlier in the 2013 season, Kelly was spotted dancing salsa in the outfield. He attributed this urge to dance salsa to moves his mother taught him after urging him to take lessons when he was a child. Kelly received a charro jacket in a jersey swap with a mariachi musician in celebration of his Mexican heritage and wore it to the Dodgers' championship trip to the White House following the 2020 season.

Although Kelly played baseball as a child, he was not a fan of the sport. However, he once stated that he "liked Oakland a lot for a long time", and would later follow the careers of his favorite players.
