= Lucas Harrell =

American baseball player (born 1985)

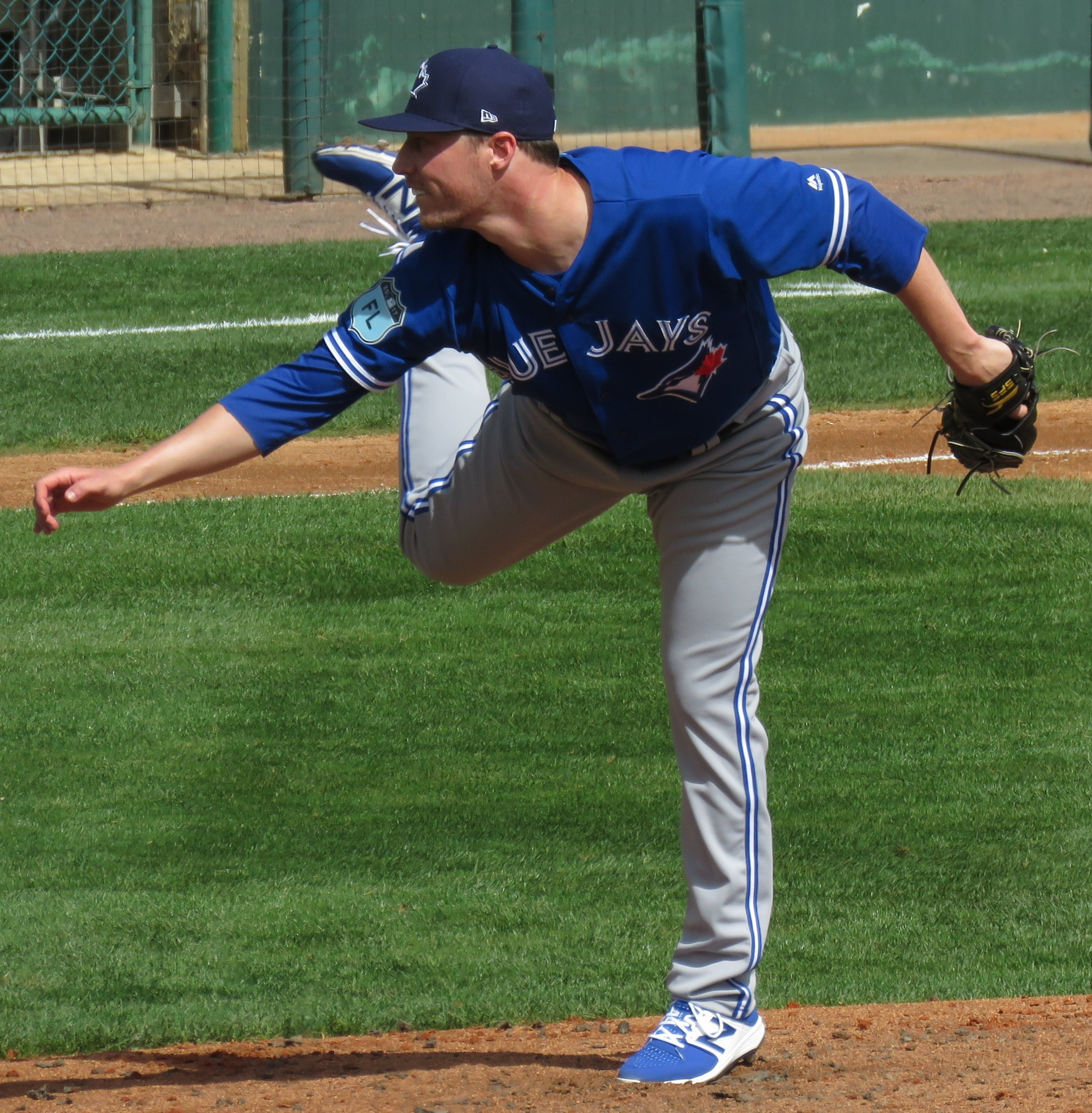
- Harrell with the Toronto Blue Jays in 2017
- Pitcher
- Born: June 3, 1985 (age 41); Springfield, Missouri, U.S.
- Batted: Switch Threw: Right

Professional debut
- MLB: July 30, 2010, for the Chicago White Sox
- KBO: March 31, 2015, for the LG Twins

Last appearance
- MLB: July 16, 2017, for the Toronto Blue Jays
- KBO: October 2, 2015, for the LG Twins

MLB statistics
- Win–loss record: 21–35
- Earned run average: 4.81
- Strikeouts: 310

KBO statistics
- Win–loss record: 10–11
- Earned run average: 4.93
- Strikeouts: 151
- Stats at Baseball Reference

Teams
- Chicago White Sox (2010–2011); Houston Astros (2011–2014); LG Twins (2015); Atlanta Braves (2016); Texas Rangers (2016); Toronto Blue Jays (2017)
Medals
Men's baseball
Representing United States
Baseball World Cup
Gold medal – first place	2009 Nettuno	Team

Lucas William Bradley Harrell (born June 3, 1985) is an American former professional baseball pitcher. He played in Major League Baseball (MLB) for the Chicago White Sox, Houston Astros, Atlanta Braves, Texas Rangers, and Toronto Blue Jays, and in the KBO League for the LG Twins.

== High school ==
As a shortstop/pitcher, Harrell led Ozark High School to its first state championship in 2004 over Mary Institute and St. Louis Country Day School (MICDS). That same year Harrell went 10–1 with a 1.09 ERA. Harrell had three hits in the State Championship game against MICDS. In the semi-final game at the state championship, Harrell was 2–3 with a double and go-ahead home run to lead off the 6th inning. He also threw a complete game as Ozark scored a 2–1 victory over nationally ranked Sikeston, Missouri. Harrell also played on the Ozark state championship basketball team in 2003.

== Professional career ==
=== Chicago White Sox ===
Harrell was drafted out of high school by the Chicago White Sox in the 4th round (119th overall) of the 2004 Major League Baseball draft. Harrell began his professional career for the Rookie League Bristol White Sox in 2004. Making 9 starts in 13 appearances, he had a 3–5 record with a 5.59 ERA.

In 2005, Harrell advanced to the Single-A Kannapolis Intimidators. He went 7–11 with a 3.65 ERA. His 26 starts and 11 losses led the Intimidators, was tied for 3rd on the team in wins, and was third on the team in strikeouts (85). In 2006, Harrell split the season between the Single-A Winston-Salem Warthogs and the Double-A Birmingham Barons. Making a combined 20 starts, he went 7–4 with a 3.18 ERA. Harrell was also a Carolina League midseason All-Star.

In 2007, Harrell missed the entire season following right shoulder surgery. On November 20, 2007, the White Sox purchased Harrell's contract, protecting him from the Rule 5 draft.

Harrell made his MLB debut on July 30, 2010, pitching six innings and allowing only one run in a 6–1 win over the Oakland Athletics and immediately returned to the Triple-A Charlotte Knights. On May 29, 2011, Harrell was recalled to take the spot of Tony Peña, who was placed on the 15-day disabled list.

=== Houston Astros ===
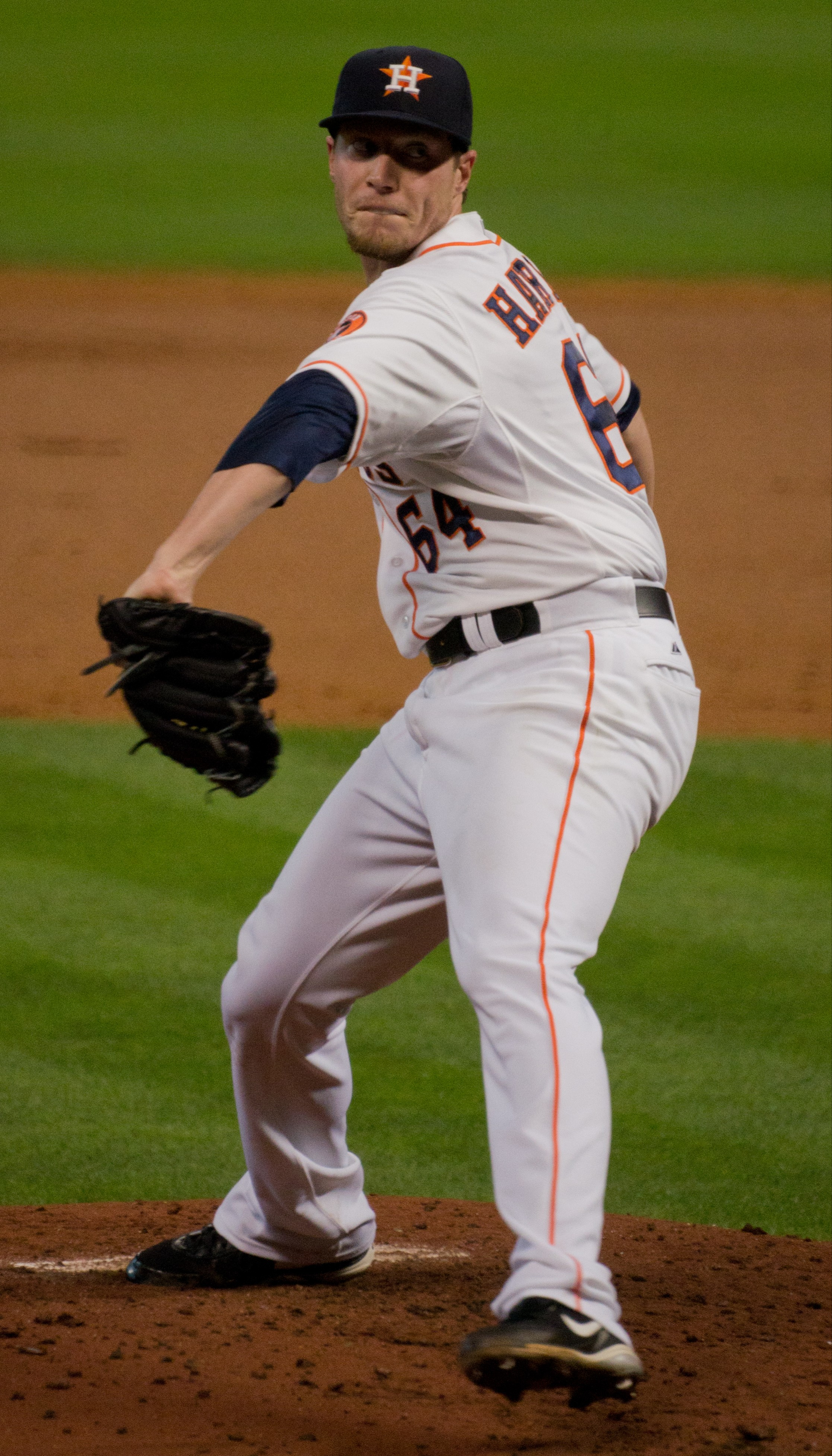
Harrell pitching for the Houston Astros in 2013

On July 8, 2011, Harrell was claimed off waivers by the Houston Astros. His first start with the Astros was on September 2 against the Brewers. He finished the 2011 season with a 4.50 ERA, 15 strikeouts, a 0–2 record, and a 1.72 WHIP.

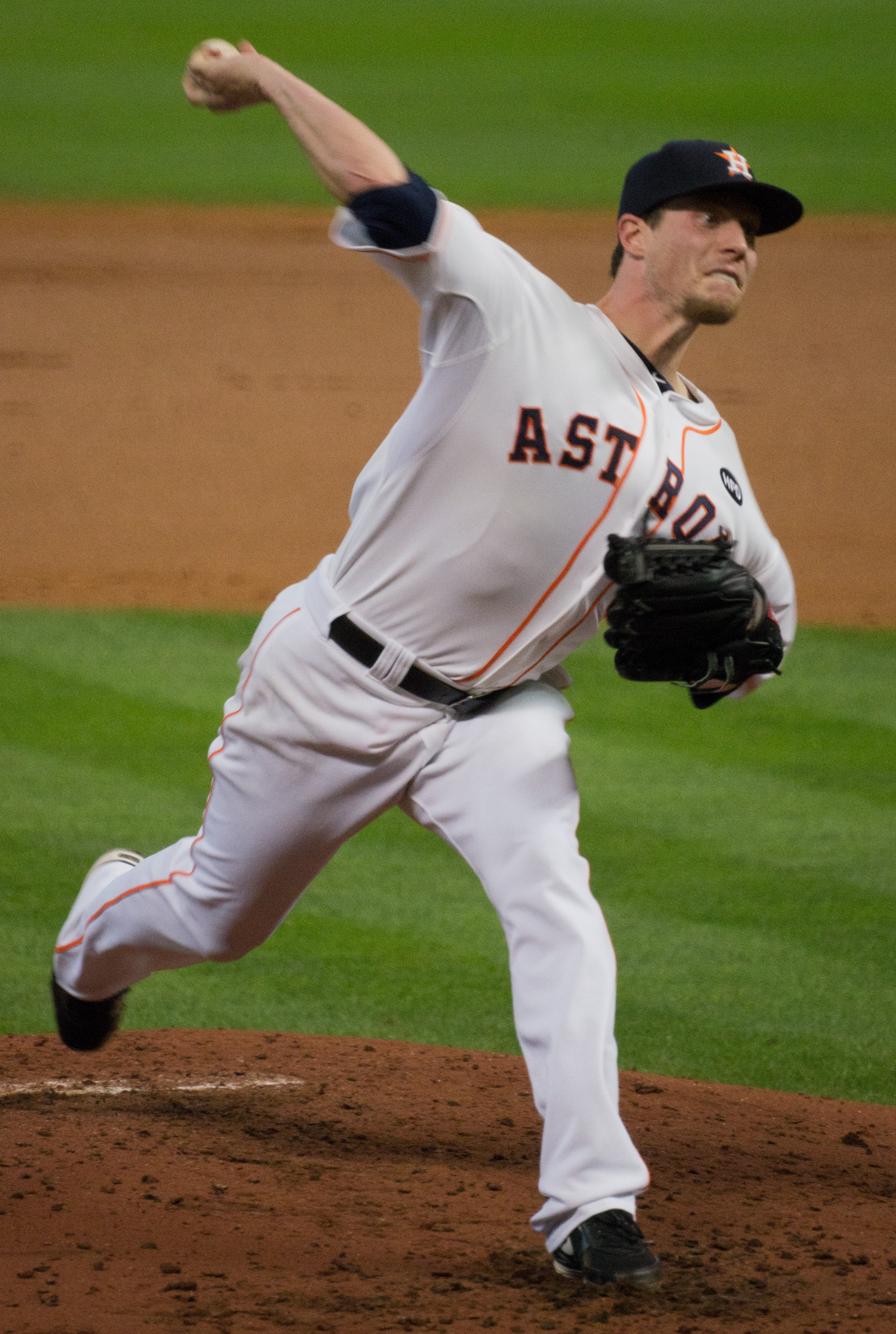
Harrell pitching for the Houston Astros in 2013

On April 2, 2012 Harrell was declared a starting pitcher in the team's Opening Day rotation. In his first start of the season, he threw seven scoreless innings and allowed three hits while striking out four against the Colorado Rockies. Harrell also got his first major league hit, a bunt that hugged the third-base line and stayed fair.

On June 27, 2012 he recorded his first shutout and complete game in a 1–0 win over the San Diego Padres. Not since Taylor Buchholz in 2006 had an Astros rookie pitcher recorded a shutout. Harrell finished with team bests in wins (11), innings pitched (193.2), ERA (3.76) and in WHIP (1.35).

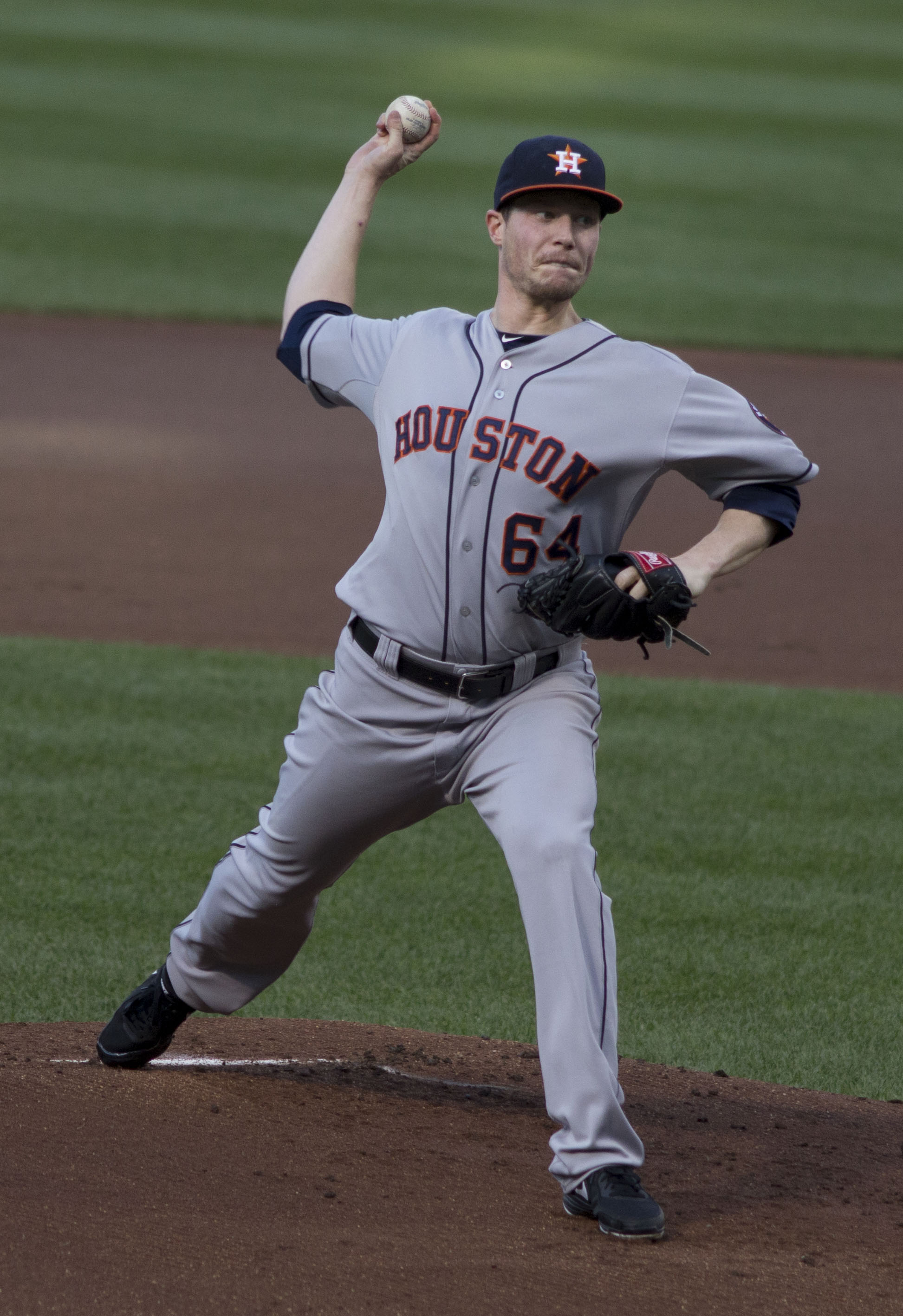
Harrell pitching for the Houston Astros in 2013

In 2013, Harrell pitched poorly throughout the season. At one point he was demoted to the bullpen but was placed back in the rotation by the end of the season. Harrell finished with a league high 17 losses accompanied by a 5.86 ERA in 36 games (22 starts). He also finished with a league high 88 walks.

On April 16, 2014, the Astros designated Harrell for assignment. He was outrighted to the minor leagues on April 22.

=== Arizona Diamondbacks ===
On April 28, 2014 the Astros traded Harrell to the Arizona Diamondbacks in exchange for a player to be named later or cash considerations. The Diamondbacks released Harrell on August 24, 2014. His stats were poor, after starting out well in his first few starts in Reno, Harrell declined gradually over the course of the next few months. In over 100 innings pitched, Harrell had 77 walks against 67 strikeouts and registered a WHIP of 1.80 in 22 games for the Aces.

=== LG Twins ===
On November 25, 2014, Harrell signed with the LG Twins of the KBO League. He became a free agent following the 2015 season.

=== Detroit Tigers ===
On March 7, 2016, Harrell signed a minor league contract with the Detroit Tigers. Harrell appeared in six games between the Triple-A Toledo Mud Hens and Double-A Erie SeaWolves. He was released on May 16.

=== Atlanta Braves ===
On May 20, 2016, Harrell signed a minor league contract with the Atlanta Braves On July 2, the Braves called him up to make a spot start. Harrell pitched six innings, yielding one run on five hits in his first major league start since April 15, 2014, and earned his first win since August 14, 2013.

=== Texas Rangers ===
On July 27, 2016, the Braves traded Harrell and Darío Álvarez to the Texas Rangers for Travis Demeritte. Harrell made his Rangers debut on July 31, and earned a win. On October 28, Harrell rejected an outright assignment to the minor leagues and became a free agent.

=== Toronto Blue Jays ===
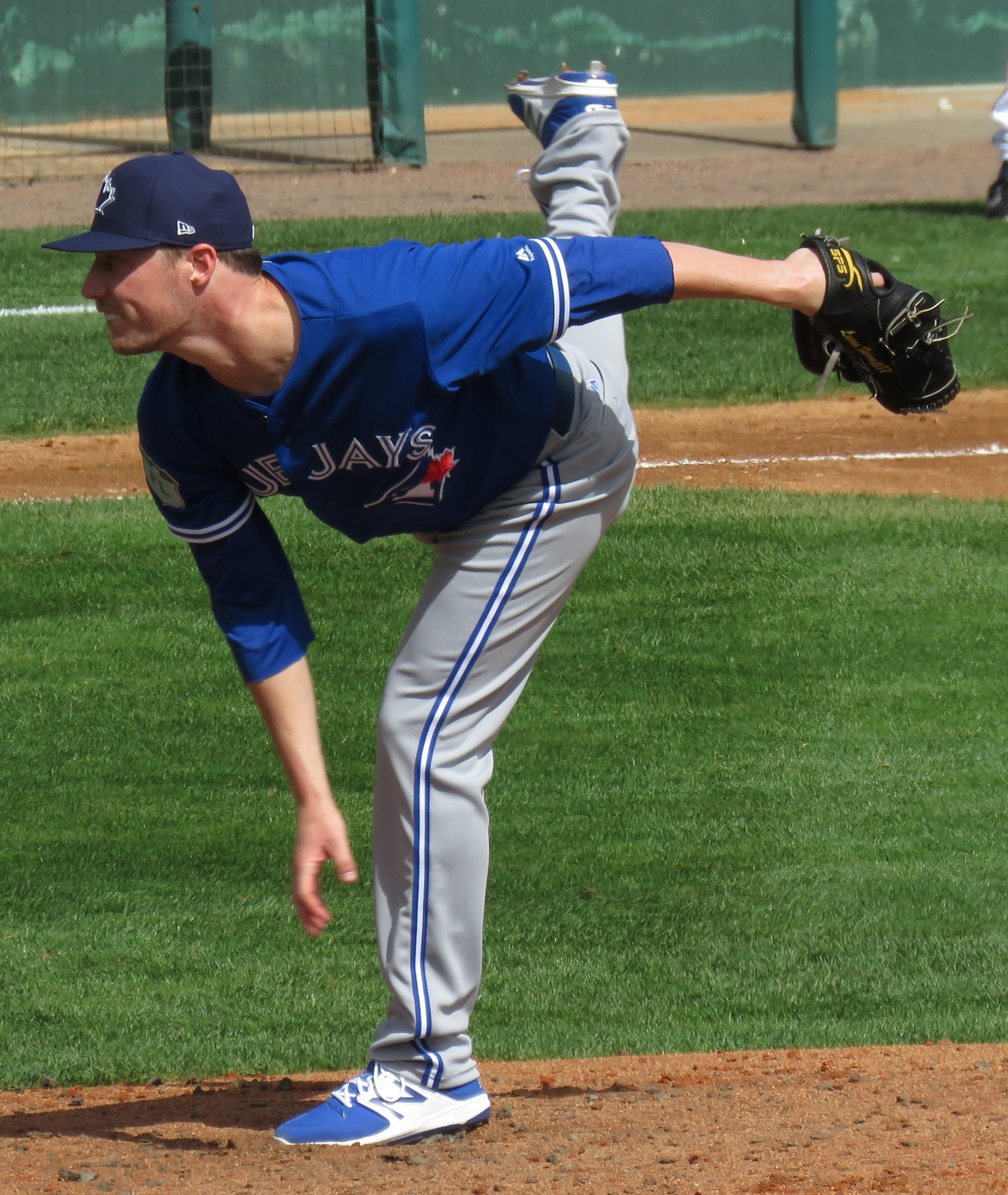
Harrell pitching for the Toronto Blue Jays in 2017 Spring Training

On January 30, 2017, Harrell signed a minor league contract with the Toronto Blue Jays that included an invitation to spring training. On July 1, Harrell was called up by the Blue Jays. He posted a 7.11 ERA in 4 games for Toronto before he was designated for assignment on July 17. He cleared waivers and was sent outright to the Triple–A Buffalo Bisons on July 21. On October 6, Harrell elected free agency.

== International career ==
In 2009, Harrell was called up to play in the Baseball World Cup with Team USA. Harrell and the USA Baseball team won the World Cup and the Gold Medals.

== Scouting report ==
Harrell is an extreme ground ball pitcher, relying on a 91 MPH two-seam fastball. In 2012, he averaged 57% ground ball outs, ranking in the top 5 in the major leagues. He also throws an upper 80's slider, a curveball and a changeup.
