= Víctor Marte =

Dominican baseball player (born 1980)

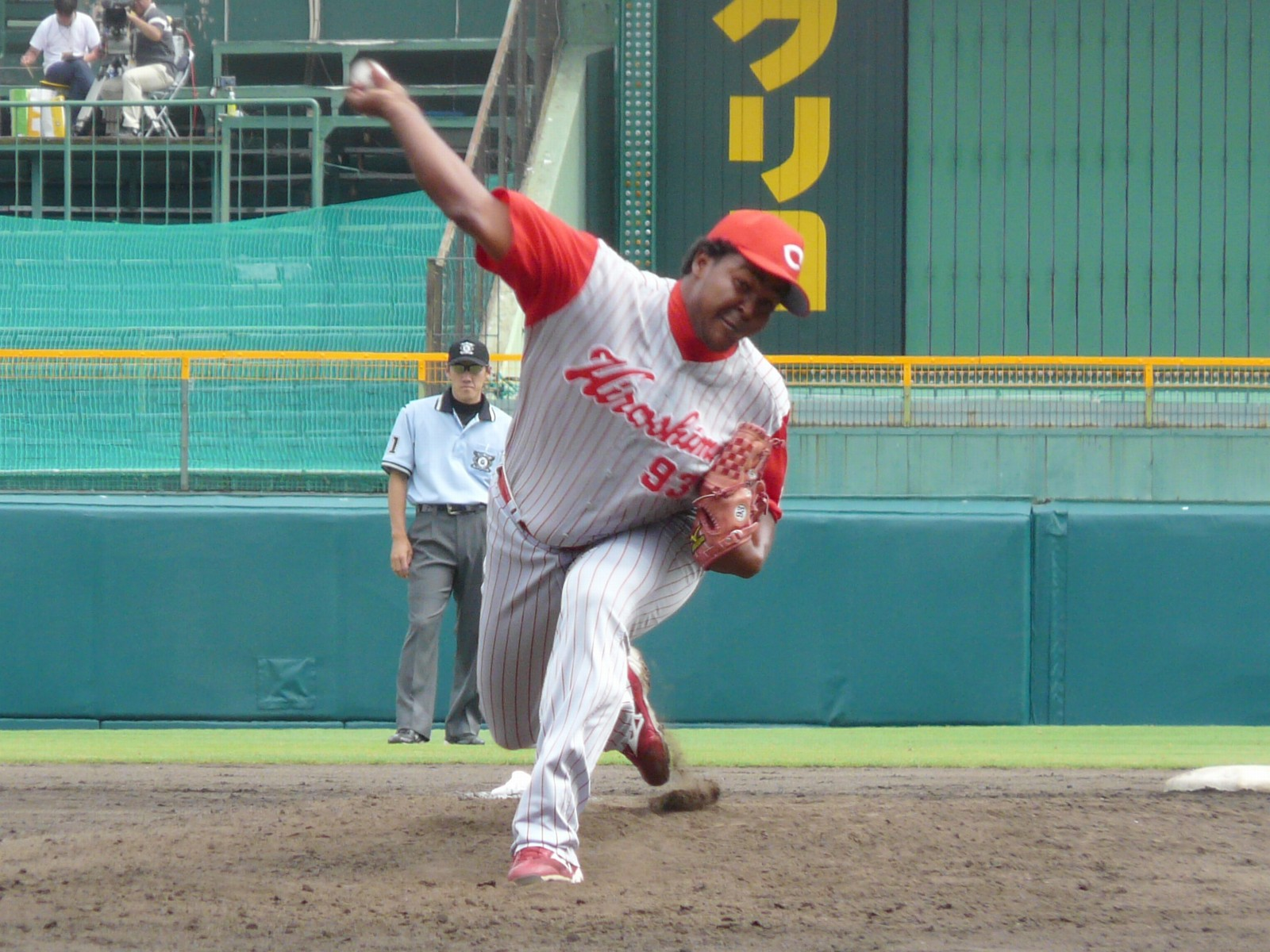
- Marte with the Hiroshima Toyo Carp
- Relief pitcher
- Born: November 8, 1980 (age 45); Puerto Plata, Dominican Republic
- Batted: Right Threw: Right

MLB debut
- September 6, 2009, for the Kansas City Royals

Last MLB appearance
- June 4, 2013, for the St. Louis Cardinals

MLB statistics
- Win–loss record: 6–3
- Earned run average: 7.05
- Strikeouts: 64
- Stats at Baseball Reference

Teams
- Hiroshima Toyo Carp (2006–2008); Kansas City Royals (2009–2010); St. Louis Cardinals (2012–2013)

Víctor Manuel Marte (born November 8, 1980) is a Dominican former Major League Baseball pitcher. He is 6 feet 2 inches (1.88 m) and weighs 265 pounds (120 kg). Marte bats and throws right-handed.

He was the 500th Dominican Republic player to debut in Major League Baseball.

== Career ==
Marte pitched for the Hiroshima Toyo Carp of Nippon Professional Baseball before signing with the Royals.

Marte was designated for assignment by the St. Louis Cardinals on October 3, 2013.

Marte threw four pitches — a four-seam fastball in the mid 90s with good tailside break, a slider in the low-to-mid 80s, a splitter in the low 80s, and a changeup in the mid-to-high 80s. The slider is used more against right-handed hitters, and the changeup is used more against left-handers.
