= Barret Browning =

American baseball player (born 1984)

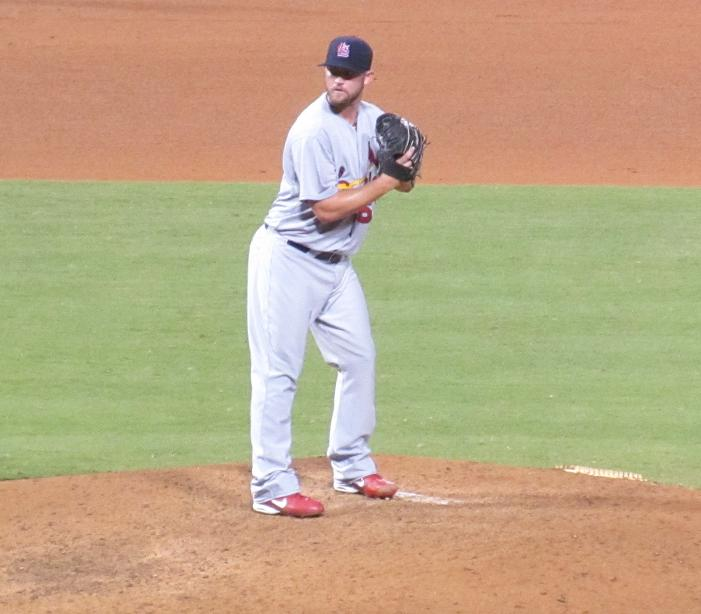
- Browning in Philadelphia
- Pitcher
- Born: December 28, 1984 (age 41); Brunswick, Georgia, U.S.
- Batted: Left Threw: Left

MLB debut
- June 30, 2012, for the St. Louis Cardinals

Last MLB appearance
- August 23, 2012, for the St. Louis Cardinals

MLB statistics
- Win–loss record: 1–3
- Earned run average: 5.12
- Strikeouts: 11
- Stats at Baseball Reference

Teams
- St. Louis Cardinals (2012)

Gary Barret Browning (born December 28, 1984) is an American former professional baseball pitcher. He played in Major League Baseball (MLB) for the St. Louis Cardinals in 2012.

== Amateur career ==
Browning attended Florida State University, and in 2005 he played collegiate summer baseball with the Cotuit Kettleers of the Cape Cod Baseball League.

== Professional career ==
He was selected by the Los Angeles Angels of Anaheim in the 28th round of the 2006 Major League Baseball draft. He was drafted by the Cardinals in the 2011 Rule 5 draft and was called up to the major leagues on June 30, 2012. The Cardinals designated him for assignment on January 28, 2013. He was released on May 24, 2013.

== See also ==
- Rule 5 draft results
