= Tony Cruz (baseball) =

American baseball player (born 1986)

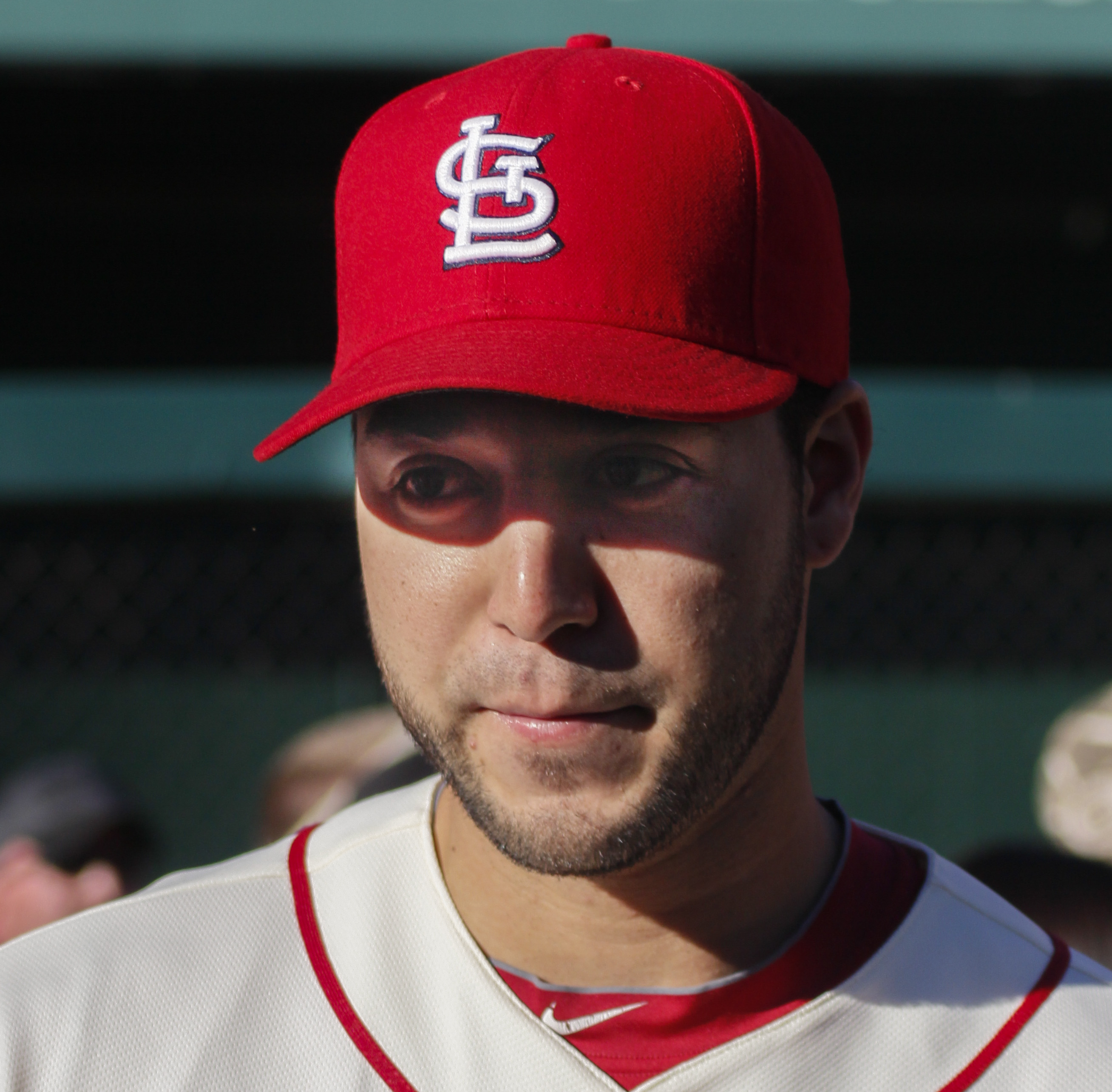
- Cruz with the St. Louis Cardinals
- Catcher
- Born: August 18, 1986 (age 39); Palm Beach, Florida, U.S.
- Batted: Right Threw: Right

MLB debut
- May 24, 2011, for the St. Louis Cardinals

Last MLB appearance
- May 26, 2018, for the Cincinnati Reds

MLB statistics
- Batting average: .216
- Home runs: 6
- Runs batted in: 61
- Stats at Baseball Reference

Teams
- St. Louis Cardinals (2011–2015); Kansas City Royals (2016); Cincinnati Reds (2018)

Arnoldi Anthony Cruz (born August 18, 1986) is an American former professional baseball catcher. He was drafted by the St. Louis Cardinals in the 26th round of the 2007 MLB draft and he made his Major League Baseball (MLB) debut with them four years later. Cruz was a member of the Cardinals 2011 World Series champion team. He also played for the Kansas City Royals and Cincinnati Reds.

== Career ==
=== St. Louis Cardinals ===
Cruz graduated from Santaluces Community High School. From Palm Beach State College and Middle Georgia College, Cruz was selected by the St. Louis Cardinals in the 26th round (802nd overall) of the 2007 Major League Baseball draft. In five seasons and 400 minor league games, he batted .266 with 96 doubles, 37 home runs and 221 runs batted in (RBI). He appeared in 231 games at catcher and 133 at third base.

On May 23, 2011, the Cardinals called Cruz up for the first time to the major leagues when they placed Gerald Laird on the 15-day disabled list (DL) with a right index finger fracture. The next day, he made his major league debut as a starter. He collected three hits in five at bats with two singles and a double. He was optioned back to the minors on August 12, 2011. He was later recalled when the Cardinals made the postseason. Cruz served as the third-string catcher during the postseason and eventually won the 2011 World Series with the Cardinals.

On June 27, 2012, Cruz hit his first major league home run.

Cruz spent the majority of the 2013 season as the Cardinals primary backup to Yadier Molina and a pinch hitter. When Molina went on the 15-day DL with a knee injury after the All-Star break Cruz assumed the #1 catcher role. However, on August 15, 2013 - one day after Molina's return from the DL - the Cardinals announced Cruz was going onto the disabled list with a stress fracture of his left forearm. He had been playing with the fracture for about a month, but it was evaluated as soreness at first, according to general manager John Mozeliak.

=== Kansas City Royals ===
On December 2, 2015, the Cardinals traded Cruz to their cross-state rivals, the Kansas City Royals for minor leaguer José Martínez. He was up and down in the majors with the Royals in 2016. He was designated for assignment on November 18, 2016, and released on November 23.

=== San Diego Padres ===
On February 7, 2017, Cruz signed a minor league contract with the San Diego Padres organization. He was assigned to the El Paso Chihuahuas, where he would spend the entire season, playing in 51 games and hitting .280/.341/.458 with 7 home runs and 27 RBI. Cruz elected free agency following the season on November 6.

=== Cincinnati Reds ===
On December 19, 2017, Cruz signed a minor league deal with the Cincinnati Reds. On May 8, 2018, Cruz was recalled from the Triple–A Louisville Bats after the Reds traded catcher Devin Mesoraco to the Mets for Matt Harvey. He was released on June 21.
