= David Freese =

American baseball player (born 1983)

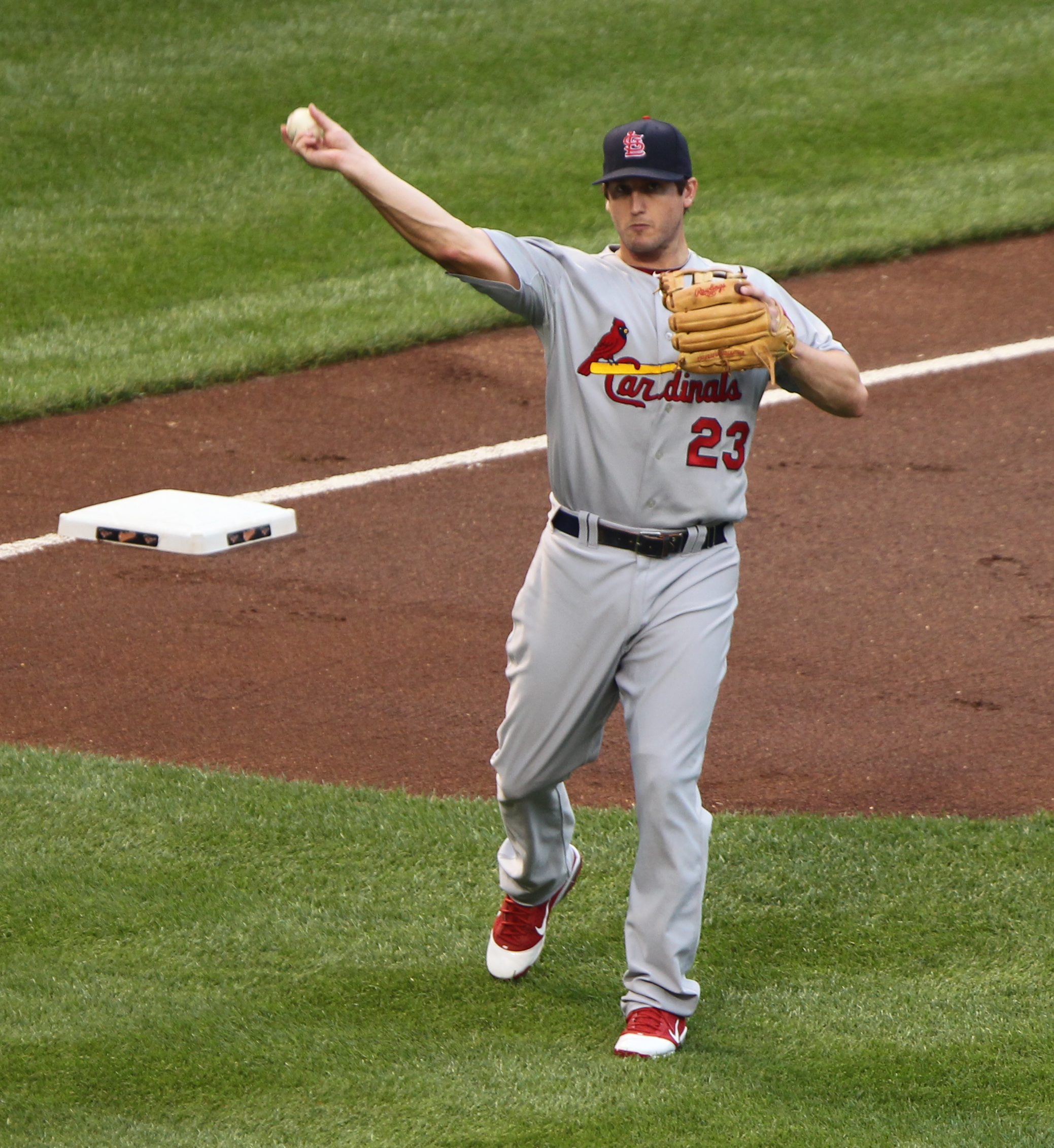
- Freese with the St. Louis Cardinals in 2011
- Third baseman
- Born: April 28, 1983 (age 43); Corpus Christi, Texas, U.S.
- Batted: Right Threw: Right

MLB debut
- April 6, 2009, for the St. Louis Cardinals

Last MLB appearance
- September 28, 2019, for the Los Angeles Dodgers

MLB statistics
- Batting average: .277
- Home runs: 113
- Runs batted in: 535
- Stats at Baseball Reference

Teams
- St. Louis Cardinals (2009–2013); Los Angeles Angels of Anaheim (2014–2015); Pittsburgh Pirates (2016–2018); Los Angeles Dodgers (2018–2019)

Career highlights and awards
- All-Star (2012); World Series champion (2011); World Series MVP (2011); NLCS MVP (2011)

David Richard Freese (born April 28, 1983) is an American former professional baseball third baseman. He began his Major League Baseball (MLB) career with the St. Louis Cardinals in 2009, where, two seasons later, he was a key player during the 2011 postseason, batting .545 with 12 hits in the 2011 National League Championship Series (NLCS). At the time, he also set an MLB postseason record of 21 runs batted in (RBIs), which earned him the NLCS MVP Award and World Series MVP Award. In addition, Freese won the Babe Ruth Award, naming him the MVP of the 2011 MLB postseason. He also played for the Los Angeles Angels, Pittsburgh Pirates, and Los Angeles Dodgers.

A star high school player, Freese declined a college baseball scholarship from the University of Missouri. Needing a break from baseball, he sat out his freshman year of college before feeling a renewed urge to play the game. He transferred to St. Louis Community College–Meramec, a junior college, where he played for one season before transferring to the University of South Alabama. The San Diego Padres selected Freese in the ninth round of the 2006 MLB draft.

The Cardinals acquired Freese before the 2008 season. He made his MLB debut on Opening Day 2009 due to an injury to starting third baseman Troy Glaus. Despite suffering his own injuries in the minor leagues and in his first two MLB seasons, Freese batted .297 with 10 home runs and 55 RBIs during 2011, a season capped off by the Cardinals' 2011 World Series championship over the Texas Rangers, in which Freese was named MVP after hitting a walk-off home run in game 6 to send the series to game 7. The next season, he batted .293 with 20 home runs and was selected to his first MLB All-Star Game. Freese authored a 20-game hitting streak in 2013, but back injuries limited his effectiveness, and the Cardinals traded him to the Angels following the season. He played for the Angels for two seasons before signing with the Pirates in March 2016. The Pirates traded Freese to the Dodgers in 2018, and he retired after the 2019 season.

== Early life ==
Born on April 28, 1983, in Corpus Christi, Texas, Freese was raised in the Greater St. Louis area, in Wildwood, Missouri. He grew up a fan of the St. Louis Cardinals. He attended Lafayette High School in Wildwood, and played for the school's baseball team as a shortstop. Freese recorded a Lafayette-record .533 batting average and 23 home runs during his senior season. He was considered to be the best shortstop in the state. Freese graduated from Lafayette in 2001.

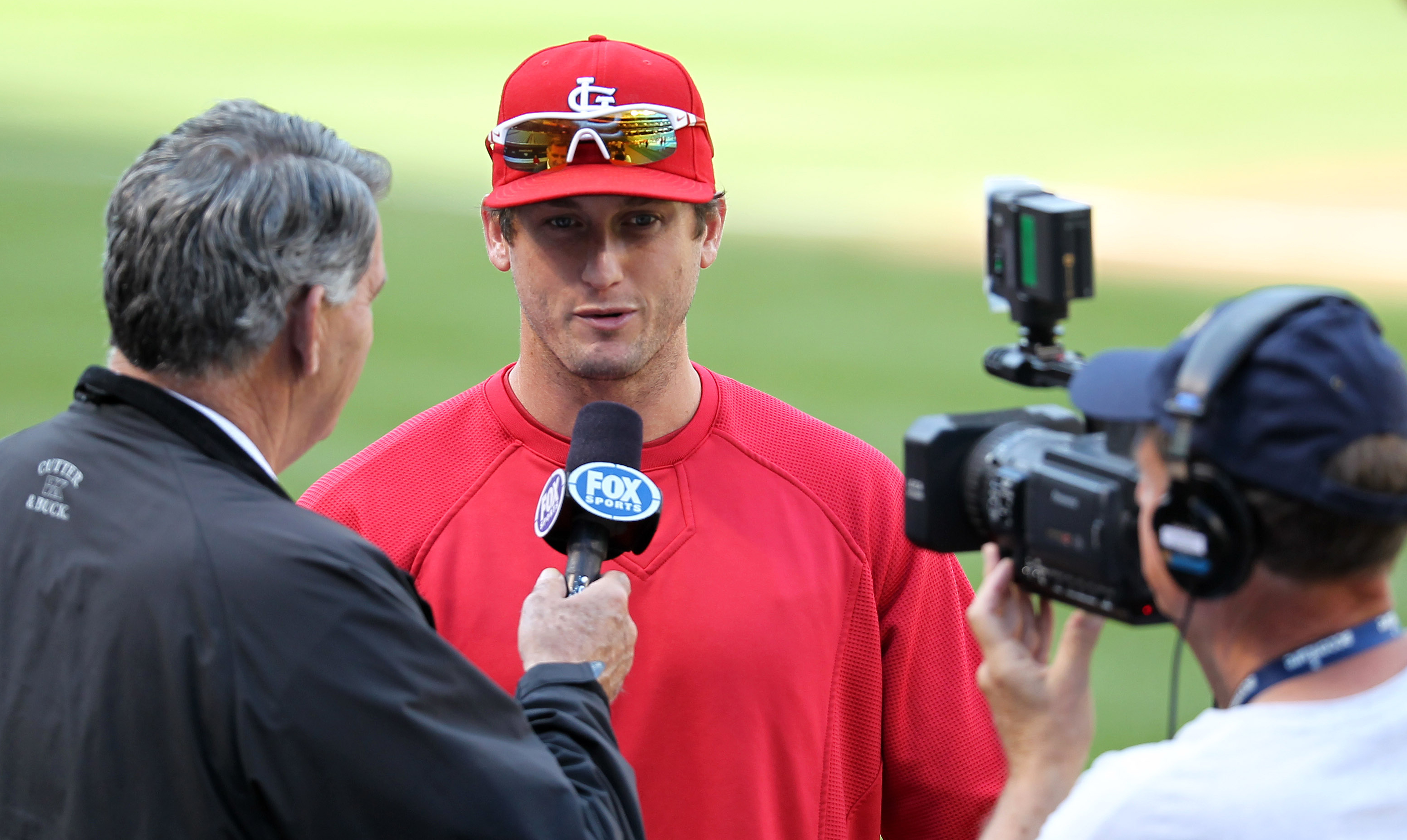
Freese in June 2011

As a senior in high school, Freese was offered a scholarship to play college baseball for the University of Missouri's baseball team. Feeling burned out, Freese decided to quit the sport. He enrolled at Missouri and studied computer science, while joining the Sigma Alpha Epsilon fraternity.

During the summer after his freshman year, Freese worked for the Rockwood School District maintenance department. When he visited Lafayette High School towards the end of the summer, he realized how much he missed baseball. Freese asked Tony Dattoli, the coach at St. Louis Community College–Meramec, for a roster spot. In one season at St. Louis Community College, Freese hit .396 with 41 runs batted in (RBIs) and 10 home runs and was named to the National Junior College Athletic Association All-America second team.

Dattoli recommended Freese to Steve Kittrell, the head coach of the Jaguars baseball team at the University of South Alabama. At South Alabama, opposing teams respected his hitting ability; scouts told their pitchers: "Don't let Freese beat us." As a junior in 2005, Freese hit .373, with a .443 on-base percentage (OBP), .525 slugging percentage (SLG), and 52 runs scored in 56 games. He was seventh in the Sun Belt Conference (SBC) in average and led the school one year after Adam Lind had done so. Freese was even better in 2006, hitting .414 with a .503 OBP and .661 SLG with 73 runs and 73 RBIs in 60 games. He won the SBC batting title and led the conference in RBIs. He tied for ninth in Division I in RBIs, was 12th in average and just missed the top 10 in runs scored. He made the All-Conference team at third base and was named SBC Player of the Year. He was named an American Baseball Coaches Association All-American as the top third baseman in NCAA Division I, ahead of Evan Longoria and Pedro Alvarez, among others. Kittrell considers Freese to be the best player he coached at South Alabama, where he also coached Lind, Luis Gonzalez, and Juan Pierre.

== Professional career ==
=== Draft and minor leagues ===
Prior to the 2006 Major League Baseball draft, the Boston Red Sox attempted to sign Freese as a free agent for a $90,000 signing bonus. However, South Alabama made the College World Series regional playoffs, which extended their season past the pre-draft signing deadline.

The San Diego Padres selected Freese in the ninth round (273rd overall) of the draft. Freese signed with the Padres and played for the Eugene Emeralds of the Class-A Short Season Northwest League, Fort Wayne Wizards of the Class-A Midwest League, and Lake Elsinore Storm of the Class-A Advanced California League in the San Diego farm system in 2006 and 2007. He batted .379 with a .465 OBP, .776 SLG, 19 runs and 26 RBIs in 18 games for the Emeralds and .299 with a .374 OBP, .510 SLG and 44 RBIs in 53 games for the Wizards in 2006. Freese batted .302 with a .400 OBP and .489 SLG for Lake Elsinore in 128 games during the 2007 season. He scored 104 runs and drove in 96. He ranked seventh in the California League in OBP, seventh in RBIs and tied with Tony Granadillo for third in runs. He made the California League All-Star team. However, the Padres had third basemen Chase Headley and Kevin Kouzmanoff as well, potentially blocking Freese's path to the majors. As a result, Freese began to practice as a catcher.

Before the 2008 season, Freese was traded by the Padres to the Cardinals for Jim Edmonds. He spent the season with the Memphis Redbirds of the Triple-A Pacific Coast League (PCL), where he batted .306 with a .361 OBP and .550 SLG, hit 26 home runs and recorded 91 RBIs. He led PCL third basemen in fielding percentage (.967) and double plays (26).

=== St. Louis Cardinals (2009–2013) ===
==== Early MLB career: 2009–2010 ====
Freese emerged as a potential starter when an injury seemed likely to put Cardinals starting third baseman Troy Glaus on the disabled list at the beginning of the 2009 season. Freese made his MLB debut on Opening Day of the 2009 season, coming off the bench and hitting a go-ahead sacrifice fly in the Cardinals' home opener against the Pittsburgh Pirates. Freese was expected to be the team's starting third baseman, but was quickly passed over by Brian Barden and Joe Thurston. He was optioned to Triple-A Memphis on April 20, 2009, to make room for newly acquired reliever Blaine Boyer. He later had surgery to repair a left ankle injury that hampered him during spring training. He missed two months of the season. He was activated and assigned to the Springfield Cardinals of the Double-A Texas League in late July, before he was assigned to Memphis. He led the Memphis Redbirds to a PCL division championship. He was recalled in the September call-up on September 23, 2009. Freese played only 17 games for the Cardinals in 2009, in addition to 56 games for Triple-A Memphis.

Freese began the 2010 season as the Cardinals' starting third baseman. For the week of April 26 – May 2, Freese batted .462 with three home runs and 11 RBIs and was named the National League's Player of the Week. However, he suffered a right ankle injury in June. This injury required him to have two ankle surgeries and ended his season after 70 games.

==== 2011: Breakout season ====
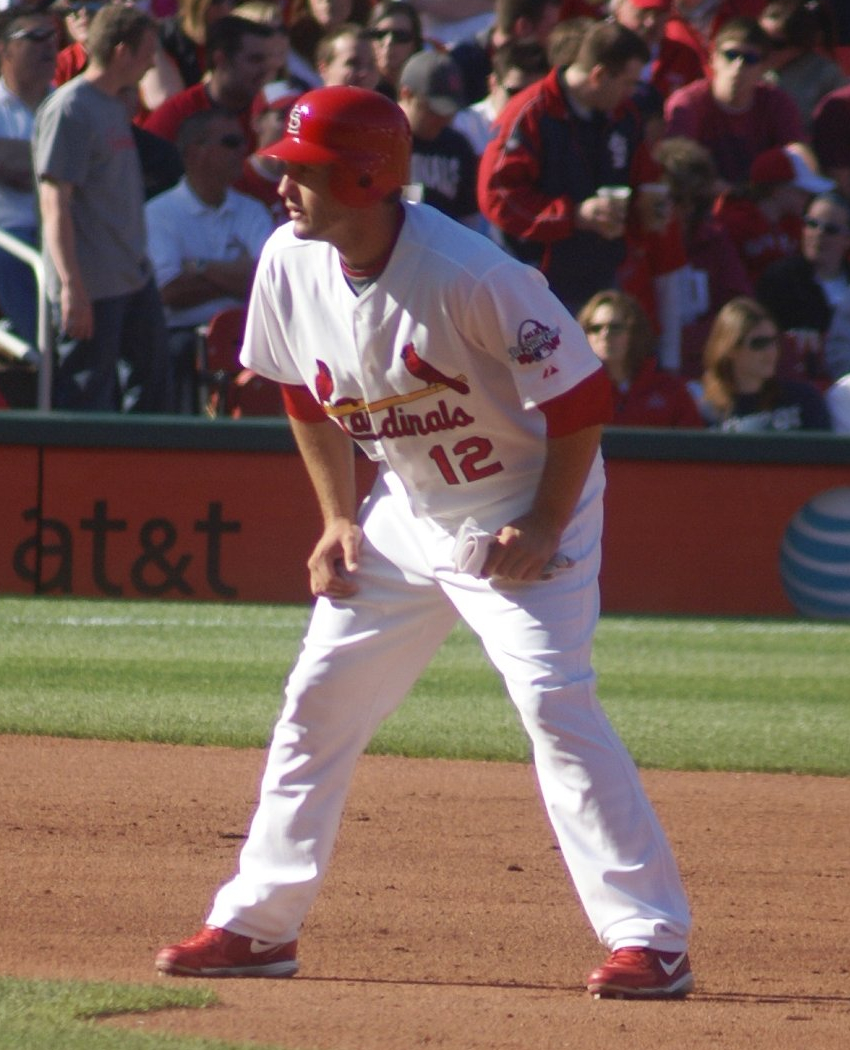
Freese on the basepaths with the Cardinals

Freese was projected to start the 2011 season, and he was named the starter on Opening Day, despite suffering minor ailments during spring training. He started off the year batting over .320, but he missed 51 games after being hit by a pitch that fractured his left hand. After returning to the starting lineup, he finished the season with a .297 batting average, 10 home runs, and 55 RBIs. He recorded hits in eight of the final nine regular-season games. Freese credited his improvement in power hitting to hitting coach Mark McGwire, who helped him refine his stroke.

===== 2011 postseason =====
In the 2011 National League Division Series, Freese drove in four runs against Philadelphia in Game 4 to force a fifth game. In the National League Championship Series (NLCS) against Milwaukee, Freese had a .545 batting average, hit 3 home runs, drove in 9 runs, and scored 7 runs. He was named the NLCS Most Valuable Player. Through Game 3 of the World Series against Texas, Freese had a 13-game postseason hitting streak, a Cardinals record and just two short of matching the all-time National League record. The hitting streak was snapped in Game 4.

In Game 6 of the 2011 World Series, with the Texas Rangers leading the game 7–5, and leading the series by 3 games to 2, Freese came to bat in the bottom of the ninth with two out and two men on base. With a count of one ball and two strikes, Freese hit a two-run triple off Neftalí Feliz just out of the reach of Nelson Cruz to tie the game and send it to extra innings. In the 11th inning, again with two strikes, Freese hit a game-winning, walk-off solo home run to deep center field (420 feet), to send the World Series to its first Game 7 since 2002. Freese joined Jim Edmonds, the man for whom he was traded, as the only players in Cardinals history to hit an extra-inning walk-off home run in the postseason. He joined Aaron Boone (2003), and Hall of Famers David Ortiz (2004), Carlton Fisk (1975) and Kirby Puckett (1991) as the only players to hit an extra-inning walk-off home run when their team was facing postseason elimination. Freese gave the fan an autographed bat and a baseball signed by the Cardinals, for returning the walk-off home run ball.

In Game 7 of the World Series, Freese hit a two-run double in the bottom of the first inning, bringing his 2011 postseason RBI total to 21, setting an MLB record that would stand for the next twelve years. The Cardinals went on to win the game and the series, making Freese a World Series champion for the first time. For his efforts, Freese was named the World Series MVP. He became the sixth player to win the LCS and World Series MVP awards in the same year. Freese also won the Babe Ruth Award as the postseason MVP.

==== 2012 season ====
Freese won the All-Star Final Vote in 2012, joining the All-Star roster with teammates Lance Lynn, Carlos Beltrán, Rafael Furcal, and Yadier Molina for the National League in the 2012 MLB All-Star Game. Freese had a .294 batting average, along with 13 home runs and 50 RBIs in the first half of the season. After being injury-plagued in previous years, Freese played in a career-high 144 games in 2012, finishing the season with 79 RBIs, 20 home runs and a .293 batting average. In the 2012 NLCS against the San Francisco Giants, Freese hit a two-run home run off Madison Bumgarner in Game 1. Through this point in his postseason career, Freese had played 25 games, batting .386 with 11 doubles, six home runs, 25 RBIs and a .739 slugging percentage in 100 plate appearances. Only Carlos Beltrán (.824) and Babe Ruth (.744) had higher slugging percentages among players with 100 or more plate appearances in the postseason. However, he slumped after that game, batting just .192 for the series as the Giants won in seven games and advanced to the 2012 World Series.

==== 2013 season ====
On February 8, 2013, Freese and the Cardinals reached agreement on a one-year contract, avoiding arbitration. This was the first season he was arbitration-eligible and when filing he had requested a 2013 salary of $3.75 million. The Cardinals counter-offered $2.4 million. After suffering a back injury in spring training and starting the 2013 season on the disabled list, Freese struggled at the plate for much of the first six weeks of the season, having only four RBIs by mid-May. However, on May 17, Freese began a twenty-game hitting streak, the longest of any MLB player to that point in the 2013 season. The streak ended on June 12.

On August 16, the Cardinals promoted Kolten Wong to play second base, intending for Matt Carpenter to play third base, reducing Freese's playing time. In the postseason, he collected just 10 hits in 56 at-bats as the Cardinals fell to the Boston Red Sox in the 2013 World Series.

=== Los Angeles Angels of Anaheim (2014–2015) ===
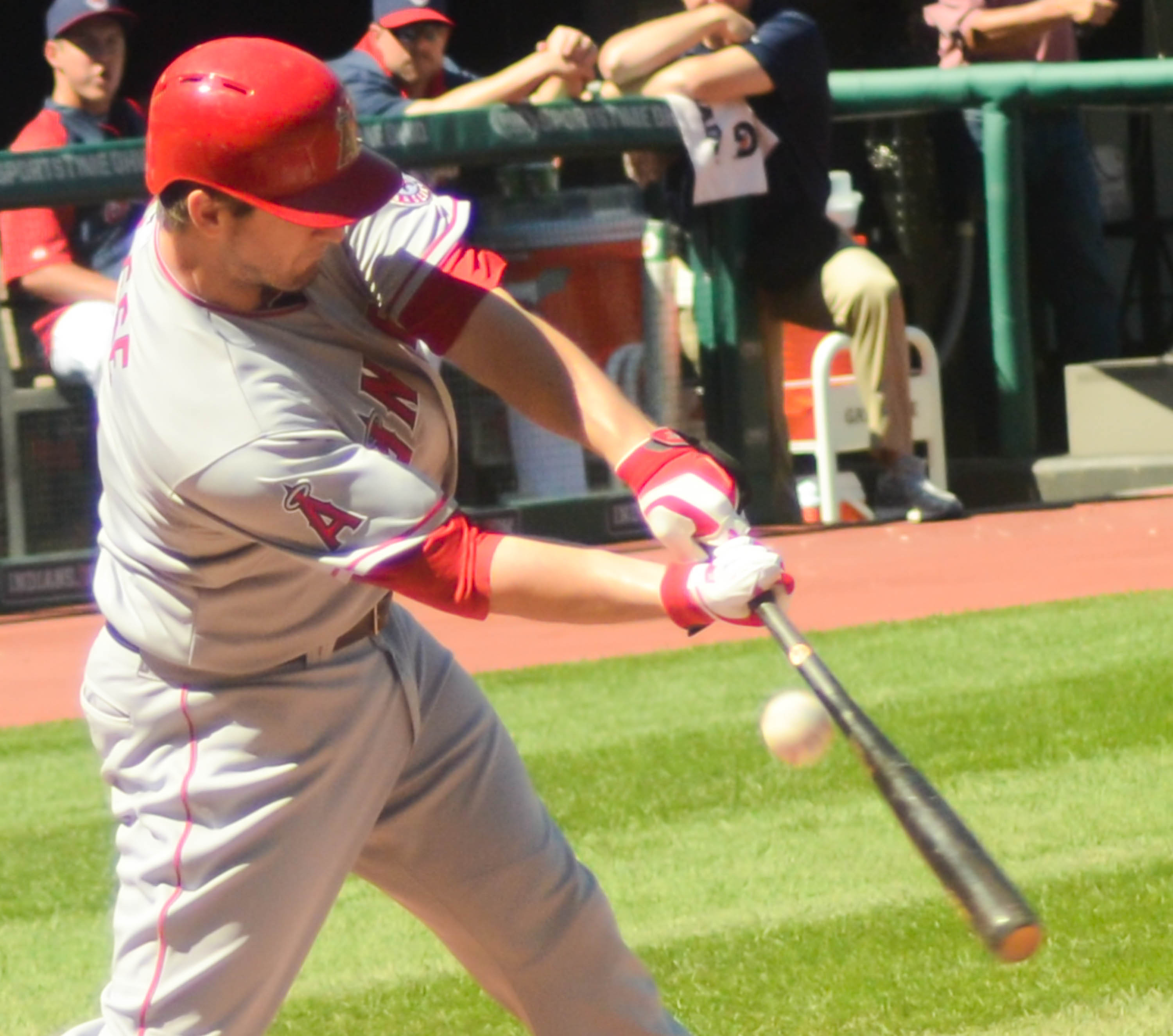
Freese batting for the Angels on September 8, 2014

After the 2013 season, the Cardinals traded Freese and Fernando Salas to the Los Angeles Angels of Anaheim for Peter Bourjos and Randal Grichuk. Again eligible for salary arbitration for the 2014 season, Freese filed for a $6 million salary while the Angels countered with $4.1 million; they settled on a $5.05 million salary. Freese had a slow start, ending May with a .203 batting average, and improved from June through August, batting .292 in those months. He hit a home run against the Kansas City Royals in the first game of the 2014 American League Division Series for his 24th postseason extra-base hit and 30th RBI.

In his last year of arbitration before becoming eligible for free agency, Freese requested a $7.6 million salary for the 2015 season, while the Angels proposed $5.25 million. The two sides avoided arbitration by agreeing on a $6.425 million salary. Freese entered the 2015 season as the Angels everyday third baseman, and hit .240 with 11 home runs and 43 RBIs in 90 games. He broke his right index finger when it was hit by a pitch on July 22, and went on the disabled list.

=== Pittsburgh Pirates (2016–2018) ===
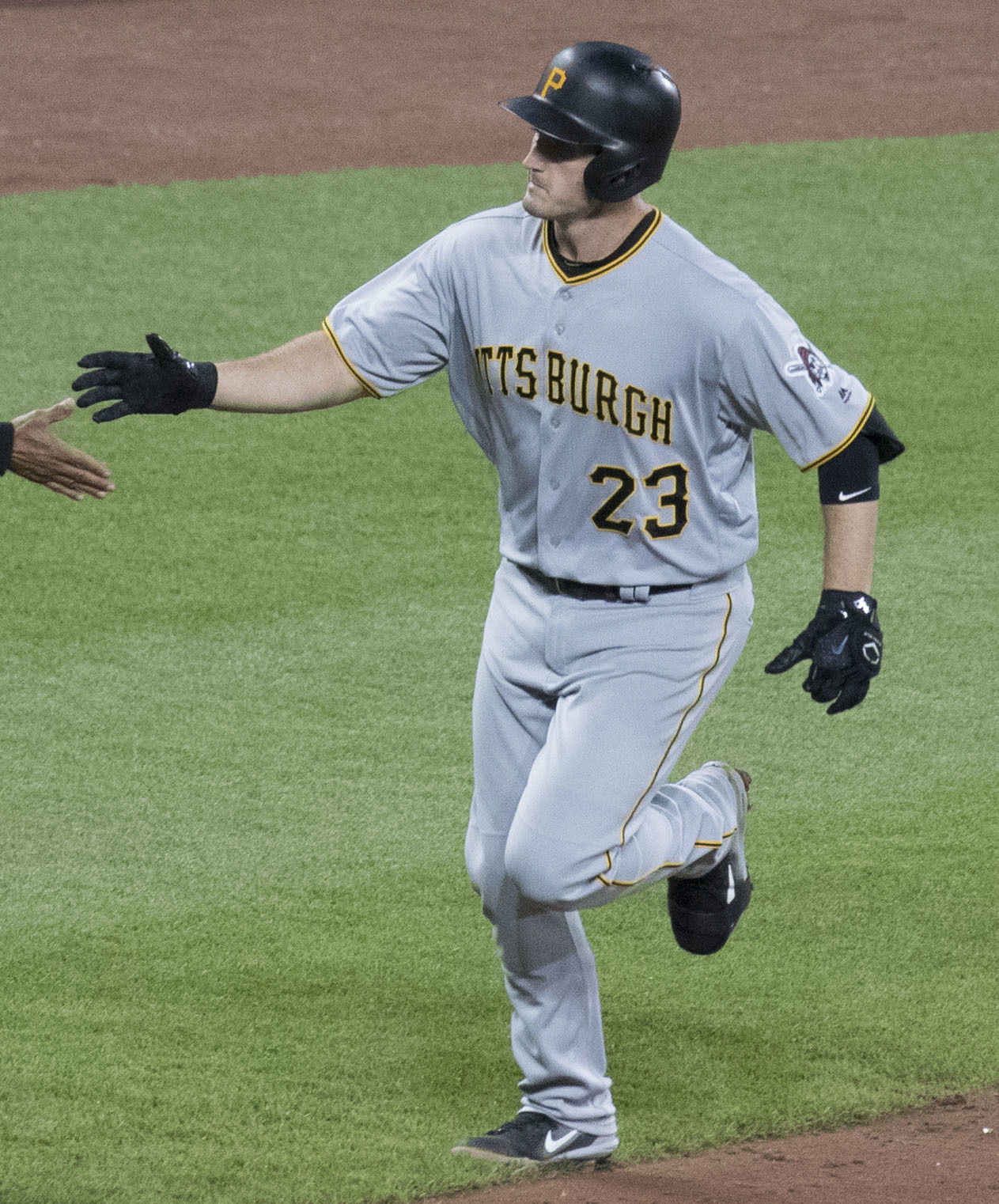
Freese with the Pittsburgh Pirates in 2017

Freese entered free agency after the 2015 season. Rather than re-sign Freese, the Angels chose to trade for Yunel Escobar. Unsigned at the beginning of spring training in 2016, Freese signed a one-year contract with the Pittsburgh Pirates worth $3 million on March 11. Neal Huntington, the Pirates' general manager, indicated that Freese would play third base while Jung-ho Kang rehabilitated from an injury, and would join John Jaso in a platoon at first base after Kang's return. Due to his leadership skills, the Pirates signed Freese to a two-year contract extension worth $11 million, with a club option for the 2019 season, on August 22, 2016. He finished the 2016 season with a .270 batting average.

On April 29, 2017, Freese was placed on the 10-day disabled list due to a right hamstring strain.

=== Los Angeles Dodgers (2018–2019) ===
On August 31, 2018, the Pirates traded Freese to the Los Angeles Dodgers for minor league infielder Jesús Valdez. In the final month of the season and into the postseason, Freese saw most of his action in a righty-lefty platoon at first base with Max Muncy. He thrived in that role, hitting .385 with two home runs and nine RBIs. Freese hit a leadoff home run in Game Six of the 2018 National League Championship Series. He started at first base in Game One of the 2018 World Series. Freese hit another leadoff home run in Game Five, which turned out to be the only run of the game as the Dodgers lost the game and the series. Freese batted .417 in the 2018 World Series and had a .773 slugging percentage in the 2018 postseason.

On November 1, 2018, the Dodgers declined to exercise their $6 million option for 2019, paying him a $500,000 buyout on the option, and signed him to a new one-year contract worth $4.5 million. He played in 79 games for the Dodgers in 2019, hitting .315 with 11 home runs and 29 RBIs while playing primarily against left handed pitching. On October 12, Freese announced his retirement from MLB at the age of 36.

== Personal life ==
Freese's father, Guy, is a retired civil engineer. His mother, Lynn, is a retired teacher. Freese also has a sister, Pam. According to his mother, Freese—a professed lifelong Cardinals fan—had an original Ozzie Smith glove, and while pitching in his younger years always used number 45 in honor of another Cardinals legend, pitcher Bob Gibson. Freese is a Christian. He is of German descent, the Freese family originally hailing from Westerkappeln, Westphalia.

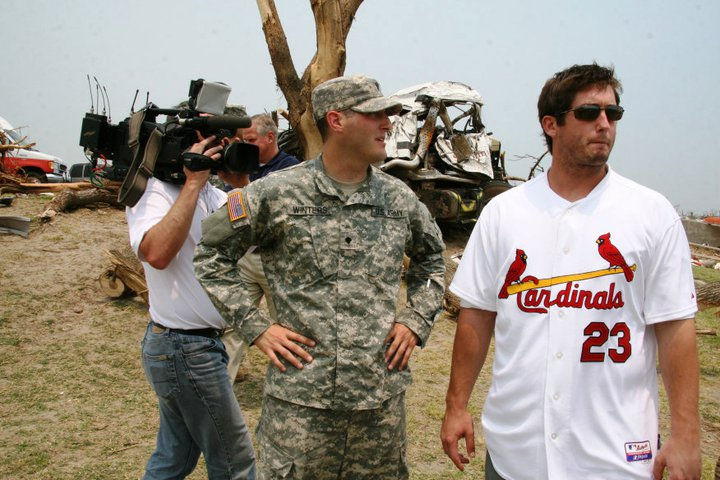
Freese surveys the damage caused by the 2011 Joplin tornado

Freese has suffered from depression for his entire life. It was a factor in his giving up baseball after high school and in his development of alcoholism. In November 2002, Freese was arrested for driving under the influence (DUI) of alcohol near Wildwood, and received probation under a plea bargain. He was charged with public intoxication and obstructing a police officer in Lake Elsinore, California, in 2007. In December 2009, Freese was arrested for DUI in Maryland Heights, Missouri, a suburb of St. Louis. Breath tests indicated a 0.232% blood alcohol content; the state's legal limit is 0.08%. The 2009 arrest was a violation of Freese's probation, due to a September 2007 arrest for resisting arrest (among other charges) in Lake Elsinore, California. Freese crashed his Range Rover SUV into a tree in Wildwood, Missouri, a suburb of St. Louis, on November 22, 2012. Local investigators stated that the crash was a result of Freese's swerving to avoid hitting a wild deer. Alcohol was not a factor in the crash.

Freese resides in Austin, Texas, and has begun learning to play guitar. He married Mairin (née O’Leary) in September 2016. Together, they have two sons. Freese credits the relationship with Mairin and seeing a social worker with helping him get through his depression and alcoholism.

In 2023, Freese was the top vote-getter for induction into the St. Louis Cardinals Hall of Fame Museum, but on June 17, he declined the invite because he did not feel "deserving". Cardinals president Bill DeWitt III said in a statement, "Although we are disappointed that David has declined to be inducted into our Hall of Fame, we respect his decision and look forward to celebrating his great Cardinals career in other ways going forward. He is always welcome at Busch Stadium."

== See also ==
- St. Louis Cardinals award winners and league leaders
