= 2011 National League Championship Series =

Team (Wins)	Managers	Season
St. Louis Cardinals (4)	Tony La Russa	90–72 (.556), GB: 6
Milwaukee Brewers (2)	Ron Roenicke	96–66 (.593), GA: 6
- Dates: October 9–16
- MVP: David Freese (St. Louis)
- Umpires: Gary Darling (crew chief), Tim Timmons, Sam Holbrook, Mike Everitt, Bill Miller, Mike Winters

Broadcast
- Television: TBS; MLB International
- TV announcers: Brian Anderson, Ron Darling, and John Smoltz (TBS); Gary Thorne and Rick Sutcliffe (MLB International)
- Radio: ESPN
- Radio announcers: Jon Sciambi (Games 1–3, 6), Dave O'Brien (Games 4–5), Bobby Valentine (Games 1–4, 6), Buck Martinez (Game 5)
- NLDS: St. Louis Cardinals over Philadelphia Phillies (3–2); Milwaukee Brewers over Arizona Diamondbacks (3–2)

The 2011 National League Championship Series (abbreviated NLCS) was a best-of-seven playoff in Major League Baseball’s 2011 postseason pitting the winners of the 2011 National League Division Series, the wild card St. Louis Cardinals and the second-seeded Milwaukee Brewers, against each other for the National League championship and the right to be the league's representative in the 2011 World Series. The series was the 42nd NLCS in league history.

The series began on October 9 to accommodate the World Series, which was scheduled to begin on October 19. TBS televised all games in the United States with Game 1 starting at 4:05pm EDT. Games 1, 2 and 6 were played at Miller Park in Milwaukee, Wisconsin, while the other games were played at Busch Stadium in St. Louis, Missouri. By coincidence, Brian Anderson, who usually called Brewers games on Fox Sports Wisconsin during the regular season, did the play-by-play for the NLCS on TBS, along with Ron Darling and John Smoltz. Anderson filled in for regular TBS lead baseball announcer Ernie Johnson, whose adopted son Michael (1988–2021), who suffered from Duchenne muscular dystrophy, was undergoing treatment.

This was the Brewers' first-ever appearance in the NLCS, having moved to the National League in 1998. As an American League team, the Brewers made the ALCS in their pennant season of 1982, defeating the California Angels, 3–2. Thus, the Brewers became the first franchise to play in the LCS as a member of each league. The Cardinals, meanwhile, appeared in the NLCS for the first time since winning the 2006 World Series. This was a rematch of the 1982 World Series (a.k.a. the "Suds Series", with both cities associated with the brewing industry with Milwaukee's Miller Brewing Company, Joseph Schlitz Brewing Company, and Pabst Brewing Company and St. Louis, whose Anheuser-Busch company is namesake of the Cardinals' ballpark), which the Cardinals won, 4–3.

The Cardinals would go on to defeat the Texas Rangers in seven games in the World Series.

This was the last League Championship Series in either league to be played between divisional opponents until 2023. This is mainly due to the restriction between two divisional opponents meeting in the Division Series being removed following this season.

== Summary ==
=== Milwaukee Brewers vs. St. Louis Cardinals ===
St. Louis won the series, 4–2.

Game	Date	Score	Location	Time	Attendance
1	October 9	St. Louis Cardinals – 6, Milwaukee Brewers – 9	Miller Park	3:35	43,613
2	October 10	St. Louis Cardinals – 12, Milwaukee Brewers – 3	Miller Park	3:36	43,937
3	October 12	Milwaukee Brewers – 3, St. Louis Cardinals – 4	Busch Stadium	3:10	43,584
4	October 13	Milwaukee Brewers – 4, St. Louis Cardinals – 2	Busch Stadium	3:25	45,606
5	October 14	Milwaukee Brewers – 1, St. Louis Cardinals – 7	Busch Stadium	3:09	46,904
6	October 16	St. Louis Cardinals – 12, Milwaukee Brewers – 6	Miller Park	3:43	43,926

== Game summaries ==
=== Game 1 ===
October 9, 2011 3:05 pm (CDT) at Miller Park in Milwaukee, Wisconsin 75 °F (24 °C), roof open; sunny
Team	1	2	3	4	5	6	7	8	9	R	H	E
St. Louis	1	0	0	3	1	0	1	0	0	6	9	1
Milwaukee	2	0	0	0	6	0	1	0	X	9	11	0
WP: Zack Greinke (1–0) LP: Jaime García (0–1) Sv: John Axford (1); Home runs: STL: David Freese (1); MIL: Ryan Braun (1), Prince Fielder (1), Yuniesky Betancourt (1); Attendance: 43,613; Boxscore

Game 1 would be a back-and-forth affair. The Cardinals manufactured a run in the first with a walk by Jon Jay, a single by Albert Pujols, and a two-out single from Matt Holliday. The Brewers answered with a two-run home run from Ryan Braun after a walk in the bottom half. The Cardinals would go ahead in the fourth on a David Freese three-run home run and would add on a run with a Lance Berkman single in the fifth. The Brewers came storming back in the fifth. The inning began with a Corey Hart single and a Jerry Hairston Jr. double. Braun then hit a ground-rule double, making the score 5–4. Prince Fielder put the Brewers ahead with a two-run home run and after Octavio Dotel relieved starter Jaime García, Yuniesky Betancourt hit another two-run home run to make it 8–5 Brewers. A Pujols double-play grounder in the seventh off Takashi Saito would make it 8–6 (the run charged to starter Zack Greinke), but the Brewers got the run back with a Jonathan Lucroy RBI single in the bottom half off Kyle McClellan. Francisco Rodríguez would pitch a scoreless eighth inning and John Axford would get the save in the ninth as the Brewers took Game 1, 9–6.

=== Game 2 ===
October 10, 2011 7:05 pm (CDT) at Miller Park in Milwaukee, Wisconsin 63 °F (17 °C), roof open; partly cloudy
Team	1	2	3	4	5	6	7	8	9	R	H	E
St. Louis	2	0	2	1	2	0	4	0	1	12	17	0
Milwaukee	0	0	0	2	0	0	0	1	0	3	8	1
WP: Lance Lynn (1–0) LP: Shaun Marcum (0–1); Home runs: STL: Albert Pujols (1), David Freese (2); MIL: Rickie Weeks (1), Prince Fielder (2); Attendance: 43,937; Boxscore

The Cardinals' offense erupted off Shaun Marcum in Game 2, going up 2−0 in the first on Albert Pujols's two-run home run. His two-run double in the third made it 4−0 Cardinals. Next inning, Yadier Molina hit a leadoff double and scored on Nick Punto's single. In the bottom half, Prince Fielder hit a leadoff double off Edwin Jackson before Rickie Weeks's home run put the Brewers on the board. In the fifth, Jon Jay hit a leadoff double off Marco Estrada, then scored on Pujols's double. Pujols moved to third on a groundout, then scored on a wild pitch. The Brewers had a chance to put the game within one run in the fifth, but Weeks grounded into a double play with the bases loaded, killing the Brewers' rally. In the seventh, Pujols hit a ground-rule double with one out, then scored on Matt Holliday's single off Kameron Loe. After Lance Berkman singled, RBI singles by Molina, David Freese, and Nick Punto made it 11–2 Cardinals. Prince Fielder hit a solo home run for the Brewers in the eighth off Mitchell Boggs and Freese did the same for the Cardinals in the ninth off Chris Narveson. The Cardinals won 12–3, tying the Series at a game apiece as well as potential momentum going back to St. Louis. Pujols hit a home run, three doubles, three runs scored, and five RBIs.

=== Game 3 ===
October 12, 2011 7:05 pm (CDT) at Busch Stadium in St. Louis, Missouri 66 °F (19 °C), cloudy
Team	1	2	3	4	5	6	7	8	9	R	H	E
Milwaukee	0	2	1	0	0	0	0	0	0	3	6	0
St. Louis	4	0	0	0	0	0	0	0	X	4	9	0
WP: Chris Carpenter (1–0) LP: Yovani Gallardo (0–1) Sv: Jason Motte (1); Home runs: MIL: Mark Kotsay (1); STL: None; Attendance: 43,584; Boxscore

Rafael Furcal hit a leadoff single in the first inning off Yovani Gallardo, moved to second on a wild pitch and back-to-back RBI doubles by Jon Jay and Albert Pujols made it 2–0 Cardinals. Two walks loaded the bases before Yadier Molina's ground-ball double-play and David Freese's double scored a run each. Gallardo and three Milwaukee relievers held the Cardinals scoreless for the rest of the game. In the second, three consecutive leadoff singles off Chris Carpenter put the Brewers on the board. After a fly ball moved Jerry Hairston Jr. to third, he scored on Gallardo's sacrifice fly. Next inning, Mark Kotsay's home run made it a one-run game, but Carpenter and four relievers held the Brewers scoreless for the rest of the game as the Cardinals' 4–3 win gave them a 2–1 series lead.

=== Game 4 ===
October 13, 2011 7:05 pm (CDT) at Busch Stadium in St. Louis, Missouri 67 °F (19 °C), partly cloudy
Team	1	2	3	4	5	6	7	8	9	R	H	E
Milwaukee	0	0	0	2	1	1	0	0	0	4	10	1
St. Louis	0	1	1	0	0	0	0	0	0	2	8	1
WP: Randy Wolf (1–0) LP: Kyle Lohse (0–1) Sv: John Axford (2); Home runs: MIL: None; STL: Matt Holliday (1), Allen Craig (1); Attendance: 45,606; Boxscore

Brewers starter Randy Wolf kept Milwaukee from falling into a 3–1 series deficit, throwing seven stellar innings, striking out six batters, but allowed home runs to Matt Holliday in the second and Allen Craig in the third to put the Cardinals up 2–0. The Brewers scored two runs to tie the game in the fourth inning, with Jerry Hairston hitting an RBI double to score Prince Fielder, who doubled to lead off, and Yuniesky Betancourt followed with a single to score Hairston. The Brewers went up 3–2 in the fifth on a single by Ryan Braun off Mitchell Boggs with the run charged to starter Kyle Lohse, and added an insurance run in the sixth on a crucial error by Ryan Theriot on George Kottaras's ground ball. Though the Cardinals had the tying run at the plate in three of the last four innings, Wolf, along with relievers Francisco Rodríguez and John Axford, shut the Cardinals down to even the series at two games apiece, guaranteeing that the series would end in Milwaukee. It was also the Brewers' first playoff win on the road since Game 1 of the 1982 World Series.

=== Game 5 ===
October 14, 2011 7:05 pm (CDT) at Busch Stadium in St. Louis, Missouri 63 °F (17 °C), partly cloudy
Team	1	2	3	4	5	6	7	8	9	R	H	E
Milwaukee	0	0	0	0	1	0	0	0	0	1	9	4
St. Louis	0	3	0	1	0	1	0	2	X	7	10	0
WP: Octavio Dotel (1–0) LP: Zack Greinke (1–1) Sv: Jason Motte (2); Attendance: 46,904; Boxscore

The Cardinals took advantage of four Milwaukee errors to grab a 3–2 series lead. Yadier Molina's one-out RBI double with runners on first and second put them on the board in the second off Zack Greinke. One out later, an error on Jaime Garcia's ground ball scored two more runs. Garcia's groundout with runners on second and third in the fourth made it 4−0 Cardinals. Corey Hart's RBI single in the fifth provided the only run of the game for the Brewers. The Cardinals added to their lead on Albert Pujols's RBI single in the sixth and Matt Holliday's two-run double in the eighth off Marco Estrada. Octavio Dotel got the win in relief of García and Jason Motte earned another save with 1 1/3 shutout innings.

=== Game 6 ===
October 16, 2011 7:05 pm (CDT) at Miller Park in Milwaukee, Wisconsin 68 °F (20 °C), roof closed
Team	1	2	3	4	5	6	7	8	9	R	H	E
St. Louis	4	1	4	0	2	0	0	1	0	12	14	0
Milwaukee	1	3	0	1	1	0	0	0	0	6	7	3
WP: Marc Rzepczynski (1–0) LP: Shaun Marcum (0–2); Home runs: STL: David Freese (3), Rafael Furcal (1), Albert Pujols (2); MIL: Corey Hart (1), Rickie Weeks (2), Jonathan Lucroy (1); Attendance: 43,926; Boxscore

The Cardinals got off to a quick start, scoring four runs off Shaun Marcum in the first. Lance Berkman got things started with an RBI single. Eventual series MVP David Freese hit a three-run blast to extend their early lead. Marcum would last only this one inning. The Brewers got a run right back on a leadoff solo shot by Corey Hart in the bottom half of the inning off Edwin Jackson, but the Redbirds would make it a four run game again as Rafael Furcal homered to make the score 5–1 in the second off Chris Narveson. Milwaukee would start to claw their way back in their half of the inning, as Rickie Weeks hit a leadoff home run and Jonathan Lucroy hit a two-run home run to make the score 5–4. In the third, however, Albert Pujols led off with a solo shot of his own. They then loaded the bases on a single, double and intentional walk before Nick Punto's sacrifice fly scored a run and moved the runners up. LaTroy Hawkins relieved Narveson and allowed a two-run single to Allen Craig. In the bottom of the fourth, back-to-back doubles by Jerry Hairston Jr. and Yuniesky Betancourt off Fernando Salas made it 9–5 Cardinals, but in the fifth, Kameron Loe allowed back-to-back leadoff singles to Matt Holliday and Freese before Yadier Molina's fielder's choice scored a run. After Punto struck out, Adron Chambers's sacrifice fly made it 11–5 Cardinals. Ryan Braun's groundout in the bottom half off Marc Rzepczynski scored the last run for the Brewers while the Cardinals added a run in the eighth off Francisco Rodríguez on Pujols's RBI single. In the ninth, with the score 12–6, Cardinals closer Jason Motte came on to pitch in a non-save situation. Motte struck Mark Kotsay out swinging to end the game and give St. Louis the National League pennant.

== Composite box ==
2011 NLCS (4–2): St. Louis Cardinals over Milwaukee Brewers

Team	1	2	3	4	5	6	7	8	9	R	H	E
St. Louis Cardinals	11	5	7	5	5	1	5	3	1	43	67	2
Milwaukee Brewers	3	5	1	5	9	1	1	1	0	26	51	9
Total attendance: 267,570 Average attendance: 44,595

== Aftermath ==
National League Championship Series MVP David Freese would continue his torrid hitting in the World Series. In what is considered one of the greatest games ever played, with the Texas Rangers leading the game 7–5, and leading the series by 3 games to 2, Freese came to bat in the bottom of the ninth with two out and two men on base. With a count of one ball and two strikes, Freese hit a two-run triple off closer Neftalí Feliz just out of the reach of Nelson Cruz's glove to tie the game and send it to extra innings. In the 11th inning, Freese hit a game-winning lead-off, walk-off homerun to deep center field to send the World Series to a Game 7. The Cardinals would win the next game, thus giving them their 11th World Series. For his heroics, Freese became just the sixth player to win an LCS and World Series MVP in the same postseason.

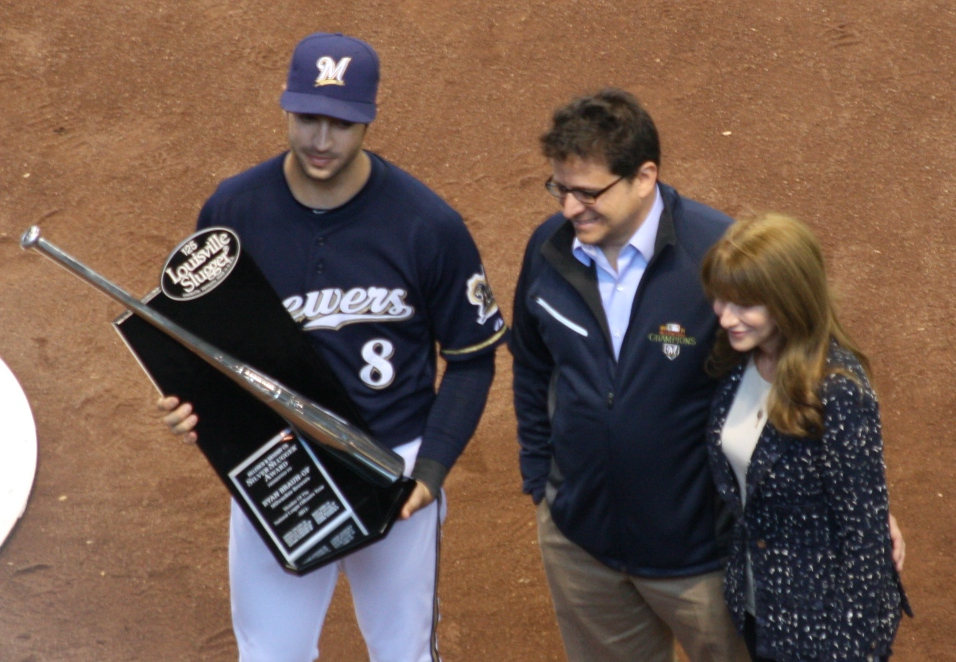
Braun accepting his 2011 Silver Slugger Award from Brewers owner Mark Attanasio

On December 10, 2011, it was revealed by Outside the Lines that regular-season National League MVP Ryan Braun had tested positive for a performance-enhancing drug. His initial positive test, from October 2011, had been overturned after Braun, and his legal team, waged a successful battle against the drug collector, Dino Laurenzi Jr. Laurenzi had waited to deliver the specimens to the lab, instead of delivering them right away per his instructions. Braun and his lawyers painted Laurenzi as incompetent and even insinuated that he purposefully tampered with Braun's urine sample because he was a Chicago Cubs fan, a divisional rival of the Brewers, and an anti-Semite. In July 2013, he was suspended for the remainder of the 2013 season. After the 2013 season, Braun never placed in the top-20 in MVP voting again and made just one All-Star game in the last eight years of his career.

Game 6 was Prince Fielder's last game as a Brewer, as he signed a free agent contract with the Detroit Tigers in the off-season. Despite just seven seasons in Milwaukee, Fielder still ranks in the top 5 in most all-time offensive categories for the club. To date, his 50 homerun season in 2007 is still the most in Brewers franchise history for a single season. For the Brewers, Fielder's absence left a huge hole. From 2012–2022, the Brewers had a different first baseman that led the team in appearances for each of these seasons. The streak did not end until Rowdy Tellez led the team in appearances at first base in both 2022 and 2023.
