= 2011 World Series =

Major League Baseball championship

- Official 2011 World Series logo
Team (Wins)	Managers	Season
St. Louis Cardinals (4)	Tony La Russa	90–72, .556, GB: 6
Texas Rangers (3)	Ron Washington	96–66, .593, GA: 10
- Dates: October 19–28
- Venue(s): Busch Stadium (St. Louis); Rangers Ballpark in Arlington (Texas)
- MVP: David Freese (St. Louis)
- Umpires: Jerry Layne (crew chief), Greg Gibson, Alfonso Márquez, Ron Kulpa, Ted Barrett, Gary Cederstrom
- Hall of Famers: Cardinals: Tony La Russa (manager); Rangers: Adrián Beltré

Broadcast
- Television: Fox (United States); MLB International (International)
- TV announcers: Joe Buck and Tim McCarver (Fox); Gary Thorne and Rick Sutcliffe (MLB International)
- Radio: ESPN; KMOX (STL); KESN (TEX)
- Radio announcers: Dan Shulman, Orel Hershiser and Bobby Valentine (ESPN); Mike Shannon and John Rooney (KMOX); Eric Nadel and Steve Busby (KESN)
- ALCS: Texas Rangers over Detroit Tigers (4–2)
- NLCS: St. Louis Cardinals over Milwaukee Brewers (4–2)

The 2011 World Series was the championship series of Major League Baseball's (MLB) 2011 season. The 107th edition of the World Series, it was a best-of-seven playoff played between the American League (AL) champion Texas Rangers and the National League (NL) champion St. Louis Cardinals; the Cardinals defeated the Rangers in seven games to win their eleventh World Series championship.

The Series was noted for its back-and-forth Game 6, in which the Cardinals erased a two-run deficit in the bottom of the 9th inning, then did it again in the 10th. In both innings, the Rangers were one strike away from their first World Series championship. The Cardinals won the game in the 11th inning on a walk-off home run by David Freese, who was named World Series MVP. The Rangers’ collapse in Game 6 has been cited as a manifestation of the Curse of Bob Short by Rangers fans and Dallas-Fort Worth media. The Series was also known for the blowout Game 3, in which Cardinals player Albert Pujols hit three home runs, a World Series feat previously accomplished only by Reggie Jackson and Babe Ruth, and subsequently by Pablo Sandoval in 2012. In 2020, ESPN named the 2011 World Series the fifth greatest of all time.

The Series began on October 19, earlier than the previous season, so that no games would be played in November. The Cardinals enjoyed home-field advantage for the series because the NL won the 2011 All-Star Game 5–1 on July 12. The 2011 World Series was the first World Series to go all seven games since the 2002 Series, and the last one where Game 7 was won by the home team. As of 2026, this is St. Louis’ most recent World Series victory.

== Background ==
The Rangers were appearing in their second consecutive World Series; they lost the 2010 Series to the San Francisco Giants in five games. They were the first American League team to play in consecutive World Series since the New York Yankees did it from 1998 to 2001. They earned their postseason berth by winning the American League West division, then defeated the Tampa Bay Rays in the American League Division Series and the Detroit Tigers in the American League Championship Series to earn their World Series berth.

The Cardinals were appearing in their 18th World Series, and third in eight years. They lost to the Boston Red Sox in 2004, but won in 2006 against the Detroit Tigers. The Cardinals earned their postseason berth by winning the National League Wild Card on the last day of the regular season, then defeated the Philadelphia Phillies in the National League Division Series and the Milwaukee Brewers in the National League Championship Series to earn their World Series berth.

This Series was only the second time the Rangers and the Cardinals played each other; they met in regular-season interleague play in 2004, when the Cardinals won two of a three-game series in Texas. This was the first World Series assignment for umpires Greg Gibson and Ron Kulpa. Each of the other umpires had previously worked one World Series.

The Cardinals were supported by fans brandishing Rally Squirrel memorabilia that alluded to a squirrel that ran across the field during a playoff game.

National anthem singers featured Game one: Scotty McCreery, Game two: Trace Adkins, Game three: Ronnie Dunn, Game four: Zooey Deschanel, Game five: Demi Lovato, Game six: Joe, and Game seven: Chris Daughtry (from Daughtry)

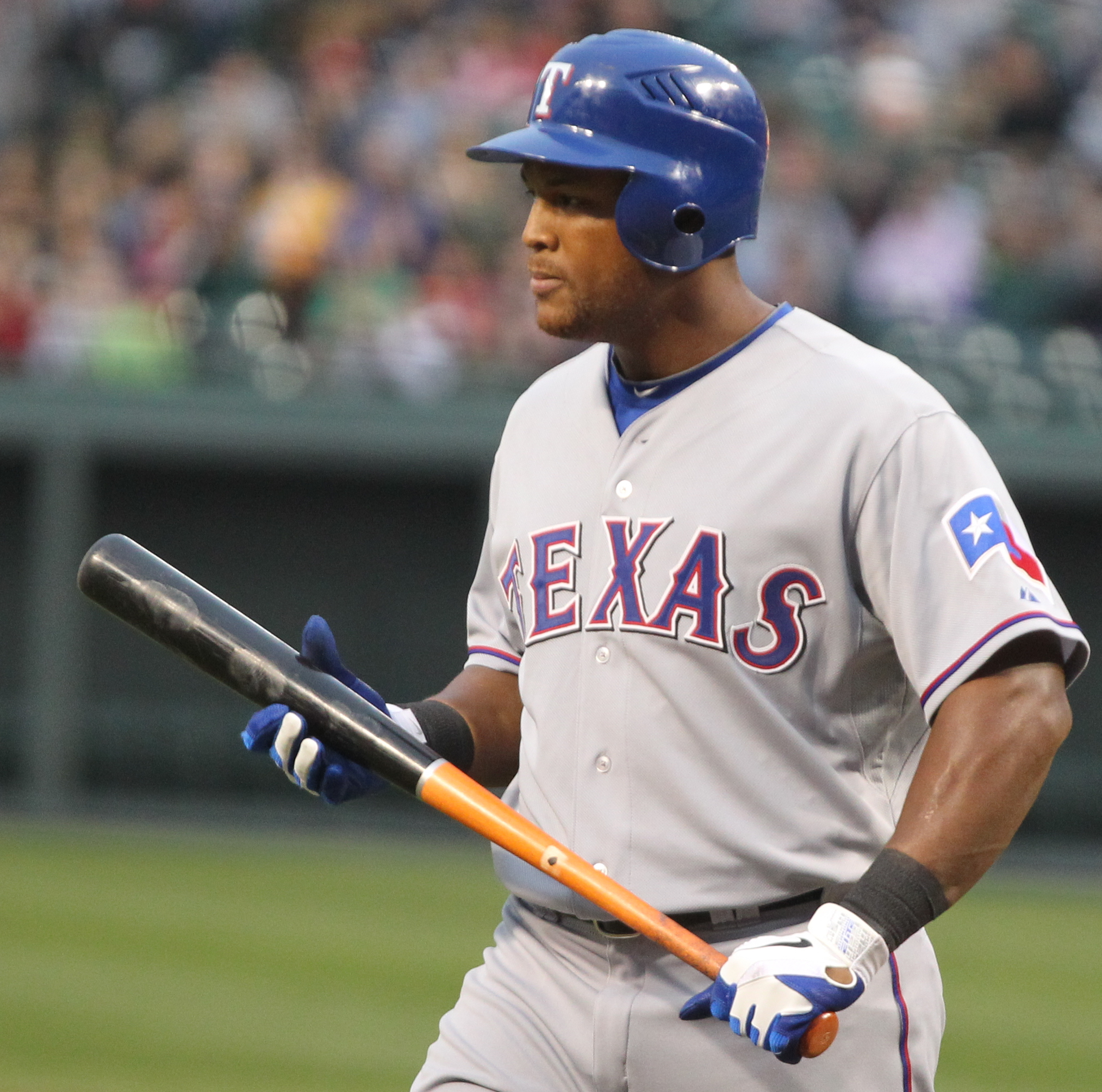
Rangers newcomer Adrián Beltré won both a Gold Glove and Silver Slugger award for his efforts during the regular season.

=== Texas Rangers ===
This was the Rangers' second appearance in the World Series. Heading into 2010, their 50th season as a franchise (counting its time as the Washington Senators), the team was the only one in Major League Baseball never to win a postseason series, and was among three teams (along with the Seattle Mariners and the Washington Nationals) never to appear in the World Series. That season, however, the Rangers won their first postseason series and made their first appearance in the World Series, only to lose to the San Francisco Giants in five games.

During the offseason, Chuck Greenberg, who purchased the Rangers from Tom Hicks during the 2010 season along with Nolan Ryan, sold his interest in the team to Ryan, making him the Rangers' principal owner. Notable player departures during the offseason included pitcher Cliff Lee and outfielder/designated hitter Vladimir Guerrero (both to free agency) and catcher Bengie Molina, who retired. Notable free agent additions during the offseason included pitchers Yoshinori Tateyama and Brandon Webb, catcher Yorvit Torrealba, and third-baseman Adrián Beltré. In January 2011, as part of a three-way trade with the Toronto Blue Jays and Los Angeles Angels of Anaheim, the Rangers acquired catcher Mike Napoli in exchange for pitcher Frank Francisco. During the season, the team acquired pitcher Koji Uehara from the Baltimore Orioles in exchange for infielder Chris Davis, and Mike Adams from the San Diego Padres in exchange for two minor-league pitchers. Pitcher Arthur Rhodes was released and signed with the St. Louis Cardinals days later; as a result, Rhodes would have been entitled to receive a World Series ring regardless of which team won.

With the exception of one day in late April and a brief stretch in early May, the Rangers led the American League West for most of the season. They finished the season with a franchise record 96–66 (.593 winning percentage) and won their second consecutive and 5th overall division title, 10 games ahead of the second-place Los Angeles Angels of Anaheim. They also set a franchise record for home attendance of 2,946,949. Texas also earned the most shutouts in the American League. All 5 members of the opening day starting rotation stayed in the rotation for the entire year. C. J. Wilson tied for the league lead in starts with 34 while Derek Holland tied for second in shutouts with 4 (tied for first in the American League), with each pitcher racking up at least 13 wins. The offense also had another good year with 3 players getting 30-plus home runs for the first time in team history, and Ian Kinsler completing his second 30–30 season.

In the postseason, the Rangers were the #2 seed in the AL. They defeated the wild-card Tampa Bay Rays in four games in the American League Division Series. They then defeated the third-seeded Detroit Tigers in six games in the American League Championship Series to reach their second consecutive appearance in the World Series.

The Rangers lost home-field advantage in the World Series as a result of the AL team, managed by Rangers manager Ron Washington, losing the 2011 All-Star Game, when Ranger ace C. J. Wilson surrendered the game-winning three-run homer to Prince Fielder.

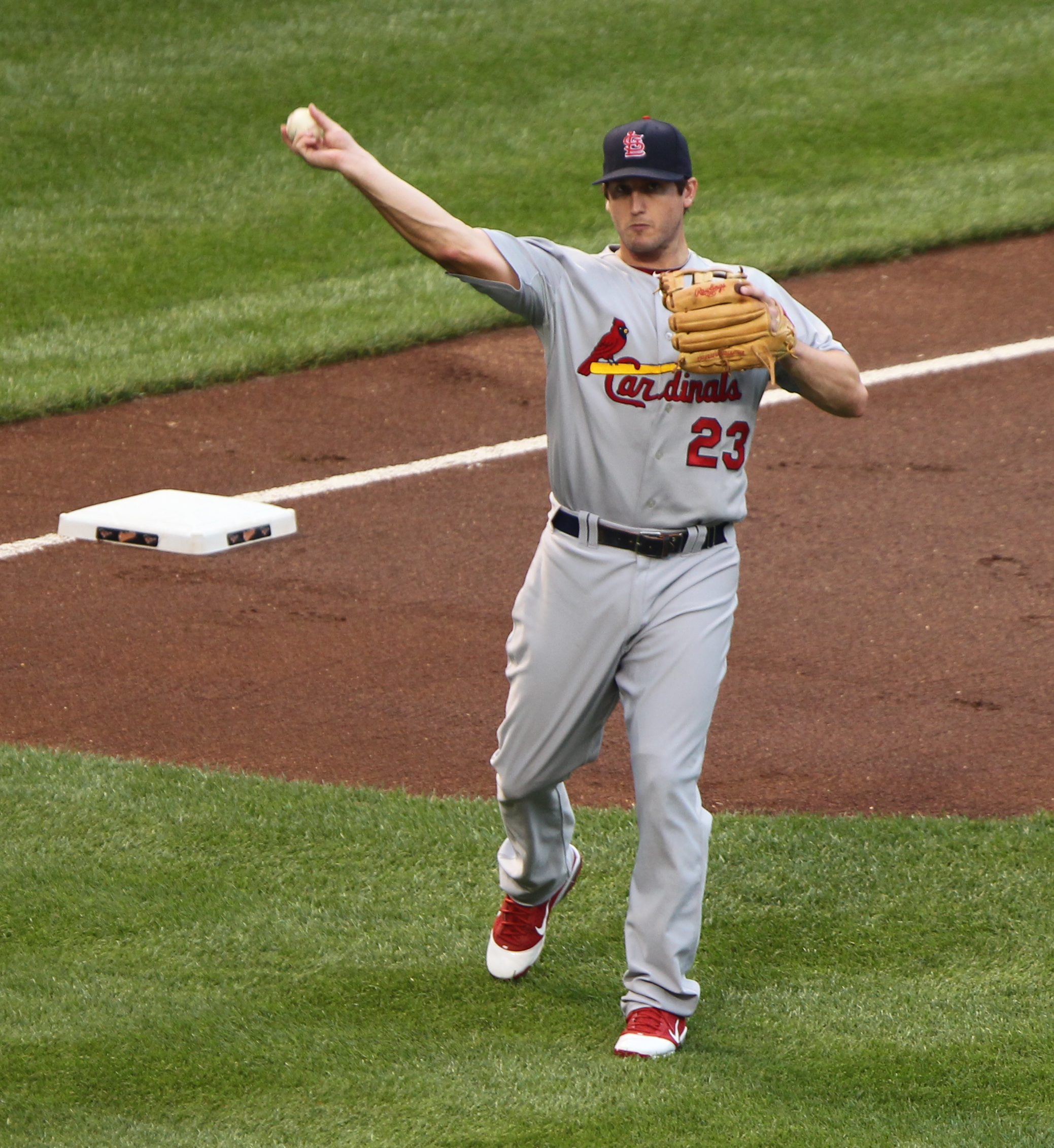
Cardinals third baseman David Freese experienced a torrid hitting streak in the postseason, being named NLCS MVP in 2011.

=== St. Louis Cardinals ===
The Cardinals made their first World Series appearance since 2006, when they defeated the Detroit Tigers 4 games to 1 to win their National League-leading 10th World Series title. This was manager Tony La Russa's 6th World Series appearance as manager and his third with the Cardinals. The Cardinals' last postseason appearance was in 2009, where they were swept by the Los Angeles Dodgers in the National League Division Series. They finished the 2010 season with a record of 86–76 (.531), finishing in second place in the National League Central standings, 5 games behind the Cincinnati Reds.

During the 2010 offseason, the team signed new contracts with manager Tony La Russa and picked up All-Star slugger Albert Pujols' club option. Notable offseason departures included shortstop Brendan Ryan (traded to the Seattle Mariners) and relief pitcher Blake Hawksworth (traded to the Los Angeles Dodgers). Additionally, during the offseason the team announced that ace pitcher Adam Wainwright would miss the entire season due to Tommy John surgery. Notable offseason additions included shortstop Ryan Theriot, outfielder Lance Berkman, catcher Gerald Laird, and infielder Nick Punto. In late April, after a number of blown saves, the Cardinals removed pitcher Ryan Franklin from the closer role, and released him on June 29. On July 27, the Cardinals sent outfielder Colby Rasmus and pitchers Trever Miller, Brian Tallet, and P. J. Walters to the Toronto Blue Jays in exchange for pitchers Edwin Jackson, Marc Rzepczynski, and Octavio Dotel, and outfielder Corey Patterson. They then acquired Rafael Furcal from the Dodgers in exchange for Alex Castellanos, a minor-league outfielder. On August 11, the team signed free agent pitcher Arthur Rhodes, who had been released by the Texas Rangers days earlier.

David Freese was projected to start the 2011 season, and he was named the starter on Opening Day, despite suffering minor ailments during spring training. He started off the year batting over .320, but he missed 51 games after being hit by a pitch that fractured his left hand. After returning to the starting lineup, he finished the season with a .297 batting average, 10 home runs, and 55 RBIs. He recorded hits in eight of the final nine regular-season games. Freese credited his improvement in power hitting to hitting coach Mark McGwire, who helped him refine his stroke.

The Cardinals spent much of the early part of the 2011 season in first place in the NL Central standings but dropped to second place for good on July 27. On August 25, the team trailed the Atlanta Braves in the NL wild card standings by 10 1/2 games. The Cardinals amassed a 21–9 record from August 26 to September 27, while the Braves were 10–19 over that same interval. Meanwhile, on September 23, the Milwaukee Brewers clinched the NL Central division title. On September 28, with the Cardinals and Braves tied atop the Wild Card standings on the last day of the regular season, the Cardinals routed the Houston Astros 8–0 in Houston, while the Braves lost at home to the Philadelphia Phillies 4–3 in 13 innings, securing the Cardinals' second wild card postseason berth in franchise history. St. Louis finished with a record of 90–72, 6 games behind the Brewers in the NL Central but one ahead of the Braves in the Wild Card. Thus, they completed the largest comeback in history with 32 left to play. Due to their fixtures in different divisions, they played fewer head-to-head games, further lowering Cardinals' odds of catching the Braves.

They defeated the overall #1 seed Philadelphia Phillies in the National League Division Series 3 games to 2, and then defeated the second-seeded Milwaukee Brewers (who were the first team in history to reach both NLCS and ALCS and the team the Cardinals faced in the 1982 World Series) in six games in the National League Championship Series. Game 5 of the NLDS between the Cardinals and Phillies featured a pitching duel between Chris Carpenter and Phillies ace Roy Halladay that became the first NL playoff series to end in a 1–0 score and Carpenter's second complete game shutout clincher of the season. In the NLCS against Milwaukee, Freese had a .545 batting average, hit 3 home runs, drove in 9 runs, and scored 7 runs. He was named the NLCS Most Valuable Player.

== Summary ==
St. Louis won the series, 4–3.

Game	Date	Score	Location	Time	Attendance
1	October 19	Texas Rangers – 2, St. Louis Cardinals – 3	Busch Stadium	3:06	46,406
2	October 20	Texas Rangers – 2, St. Louis Cardinals – 1	Busch Stadium	3:04	47,288
3	October 22	St. Louis Cardinals – 16, Texas Rangers – 7	Rangers Ballpark in Arlington	4:04	51,462
4	October 23	St. Louis Cardinals – 0, Texas Rangers – 4	Rangers Ballpark in Arlington	3:07	51,539
5	October 24	St. Louis Cardinals – 2, Texas Rangers – 4	Rangers Ballpark in Arlington	3:31	51,459
6	October 27†	Texas Rangers – 9, St. Louis Cardinals – 10 (11)	Busch Stadium	4:33	47,325
7	October 28	Texas Rangers – 2, St. Louis Cardinals – 6	Busch Stadium	3:17	47,399

†: Postponed from October 26 due to rain

== Matchups ==
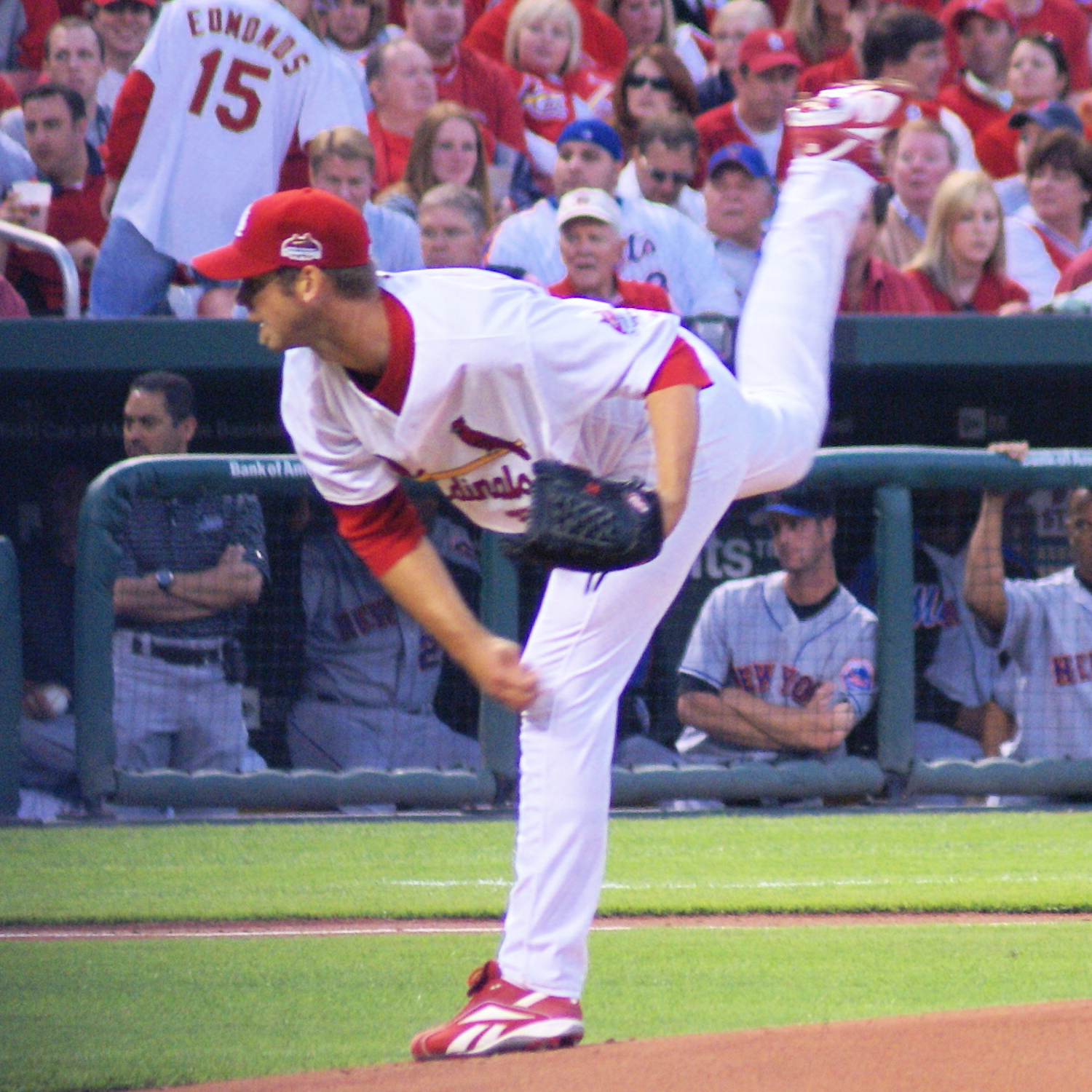
Chris Carpenter, the winning pitcher in Game 1.

=== Game 1 ===
October 19, 2011 7:05 pm (CDT) at Busch Stadium in St. Louis, Missouri 48 °F (9 °C), drizzle
Team	1	2	3	4	5	6	7	8	9	R	H	E
Texas	0	0	0	0	2	0	0	0	0	2	6	0
St. Louis	0	0	0	2	0	1	0	0	X	3	6	0
WP: Chris Carpenter (1–0) LP: C. J. Wilson (0–1) Sv: Jason Motte (1); Home runs: TEX: Mike Napoli (1); STL: None; Attendance: 46,406; Boxscore

As previously mentioned, because the National League had won the 2011 MLB All-Star Game, home field advantage went to the Cardinals as the National League champions, thus allowing the team to host the Texas Rangers for Games 1, 2, 6 and 7.

Aces were on the mound for Game 1 as C. J. Wilson faced Chris Carpenter. Both starters kept the game scoreless through the first three innings. In the fourth, Albert Pujols was hit by a pitch to lead off the inning. After a double by Matt Holliday, Lance Berkman hit a single to drive both runners in. The lead wouldn't last long. Mike Napoli hit a two-run home run to tie the game in the very next inning. David Freese doubled in the sixth with one out, and moved to third on a wild pitch. After Yadier Molina struck out, and Nick Punto walked, Allen Craig entered the game, pinch-hitting for Carpenter. Alexi Ogando relieved Wilson, and tried to finish off the inning. Craig hit a 1–2 pitch down the right field line that was just out of reach of a sliding Nelson Cruz. Freese scored to give St. Louis the lead. In the seventh, the Cardinals ran into trouble as Cruz singled and Napoli walked to put two on with one out. Marc Rzepczynski came on to face pinch-hitter Craig Gentry and struck him out. Pinch-hitter Esteban Germán was the next batter. Rzepczynski struck him out as well. In the ninth, closer Jason Motte pitched an easy 1–2–3 inning to give St. Louis the win. Controversy surrounded the inning, as Adrián Beltré was the victim of a blown call. Beltré grounded a ball to third, and Descalso threw the ball to first for the out, but replays showed he fouled the ball off his foot.

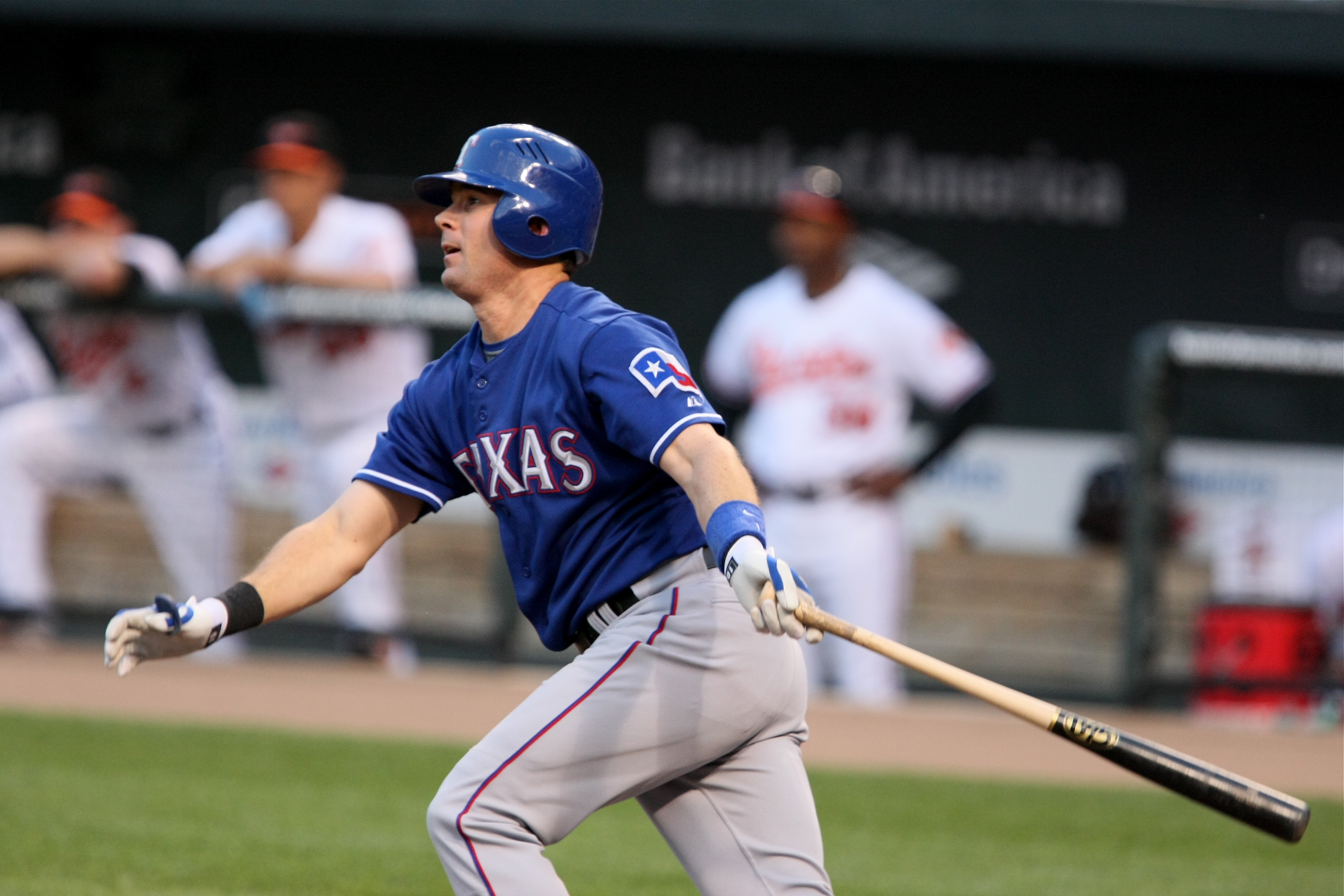
Michael Young hit the go-ahead sacrifice fly in the ninth inning for the Rangers.

=== Game 2 ===
October 20, 2011 7:05 pm (CDT) at Busch Stadium in St. Louis, Missouri 51 °F (11 °C), mostly clear
Team	1	2	3	4	5	6	7	8	9	R	H	E
Texas	0	0	0	0	0	0	0	0	2	2	5	1
St. Louis	0	0	0	0	0	0	1	0	0	1	6	1
WP: Mike Adams (1–0) LP: Jason Motte (0–1) Sv: Neftalí Feliz (1); Attendance: 47,288; Boxscore

Game 2 saw a pitchers' duel between Jaime García and Colby Lewis. Both starters kept the game scoreless through the first six innings. A pair of excellent defensive plays by Elvis Andrus stopped a couple of Cardinals rallies. In the seventh, David Freese again started a rally for St. Louis, much like in Game 1. He singled with one out and moved to third on a single by Nick Punto with two outs. Allen Craig pinch-hit for García to face Alexi Ogando, setting up almost the same exact situation from the previous night. Again, Craig beat Ogando with a single to right field to drive in Freese. Jason Motte was brought in to save the game in the ninth. Ian Kinsler led off with a bloop single and stole second with Andrus batting. Andrus singled into center field and moved to second on the throw home, which got by Albert Pujols for an error. With runners on second and third, and none out, Tony La Russa switched in Arthur Rhodes for Motte. Consecutive sacrifice flies from Josh Hamilton and Michael Young gave Texas the lead. Neftalí Feliz came on in the ninth and allowed a leadoff walk to Yadier Molina, but he retired the next three batters in order to end the game and tie the Series at one game apiece.

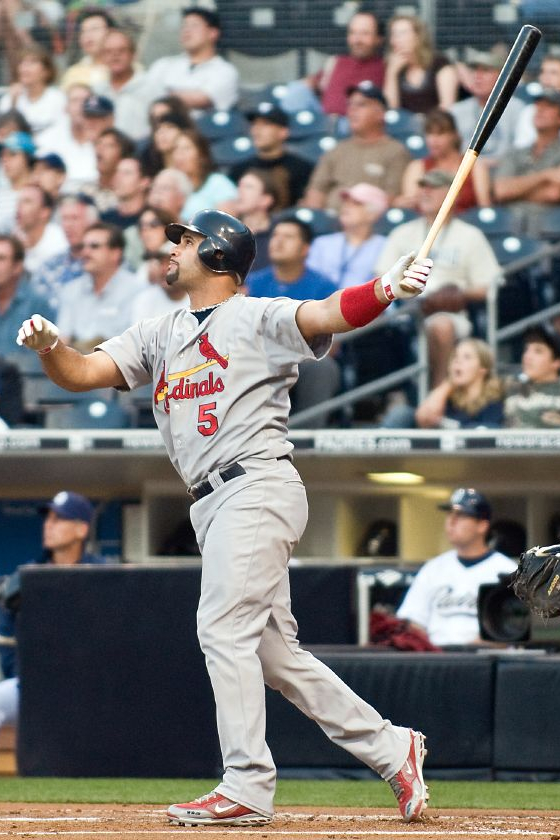
Albert Pujols hit three home runs for the Cardinals in Game 3, tying the record for a player in a World Series game.

=== Game 3 ===
October 22, 2011 7:05 pm (CDT) at Rangers Ballpark in Arlington, Texas 79 °F (26 °C), cloudy
Team	1	2	3	4	5	6	7	8	9	R	H	E
St. Louis	1	0	0	4	3	4	2	1	1	16	15	0
Texas	0	0	0	3	3	0	1	0	0	7	13	3
WP: Lance Lynn (1–0) LP: Matt Harrison (0–1); Home runs: STL: Allen Craig (1), Albert Pujols 3 (3); TEX: Michael Young (1), Nelson Cruz (1); Attendance: 51,462; Boxscore

After a total of just eight runs scored in the first two games in St. Louis, the offense of the two lineups scored a combined 23 runs on a historic night in Arlington in which Albert Pujols had what was described as "the greatest individual hitting performance in World Series history".

Allen Craig hit a home run in the first to put the Cardinals up 1–0. In the fourth after a controversial call at first base by umpire Ron Kulpa on a force play and subsequent single put runners on first and second with one out, David Freese's RBI double made it 2–0 Cardinals. After an intentional walk loaded the bases, two runs scored on a throwing error by Mike Napoli before Ryan Theriot's RBI single made it 5–0 Cardinals. Starter Matt Harrison was pulled from the game after the inning's second out. In the bottom of the inning, a lead-off home run by Michael Young and, two batters later, a two-run home run by Nelson Cruz, made it 5–3 Cardinals. Napoli then singled to knock starter Kyle Lohse out of the game. Napoli moved to third on a groundout and single, but was tagged out at home trying to score on Ian Kinsler's fly out to end the inning.

In the fifth, the Cardinals loaded the bases with no outs on a single and two walks off of Scott Feldman before Freese's groundout scored a run, then a two-run double by Yadier Molina made the score 8–3 Cardinals. In the bottom of the inning, Texas got two leadoff singles off of Fernando Salas before Young drove in a run with a double. Lance Lynn relieved Salas and allowed an RBI single to Adrian Beltre, then, one out later, a sacrifice fly to Napoli to make it 8–6 Cardinals.

Albert Pujols, who had been hitless through the first two games, then hit a 423 ft (129 m) home run off Alexi Ogando in the sixth inning after a leadoff single and walk to make it 11–6 Cardinals. An error, single and walk loaded the bases before Mike Gonzalez relieved Ogando and allowed a sacrifice fly to Molina. Next inning, Pujols's two-run home run after a two-out walk off of Gonzalez made it 14–6 Cardinals. The Rangers scored their last run of the game in the bottom of the inning when Beltre hit a leadoff double off of Lynn, moved to third on a groundout and scored on Napoli's sacrifice fly off of Octavio Dotel.

The Cardinals added to their lead in the eighth when Freese singled with one out off of Mark Lowe and pinch-runner Daniel Descalso scored on Molina's double. Then in the ninth, Pujols hit his third home run of the game, giving him six RBIs, off of Darren Oliver. Mitchell Boggs retired Texas in order in the bottom of the ninth as the Cardinals won 16–7, leading the Series by 2–1.

Albert Pujols joined Babe Ruth (1926, 1928) and Reggie Jackson (1977) as the only players in baseball history up to that time to hit three home runs in a World Series game. (Pablo Sandoval would also accomplish the feat the following year.) Pujols was 5-for-6 with two singles, three HRs, four runs scored, and six RBIs. Yadier Molina added two doubles, driving in four runs. David Freese continued his postseason 13-game hitting streak getting two hits (one double), driving in two runs. Pujols became the first player in World Series history to get hits in four consecutive innings: fourth (single), fifth (single), sixth (HR, three RBIs), and seventh (HR, two RBIs). He tied records for most HRs (3), most hits (5), and most RBIs (6) in a World Series game, and established a new record with 14 total bases.

The 16 runs scored by the Cardinals were the most runs scored in a World Series game since 2002, when the San Francisco Giants scored 16 against the Anaheim Angels in Game 5.

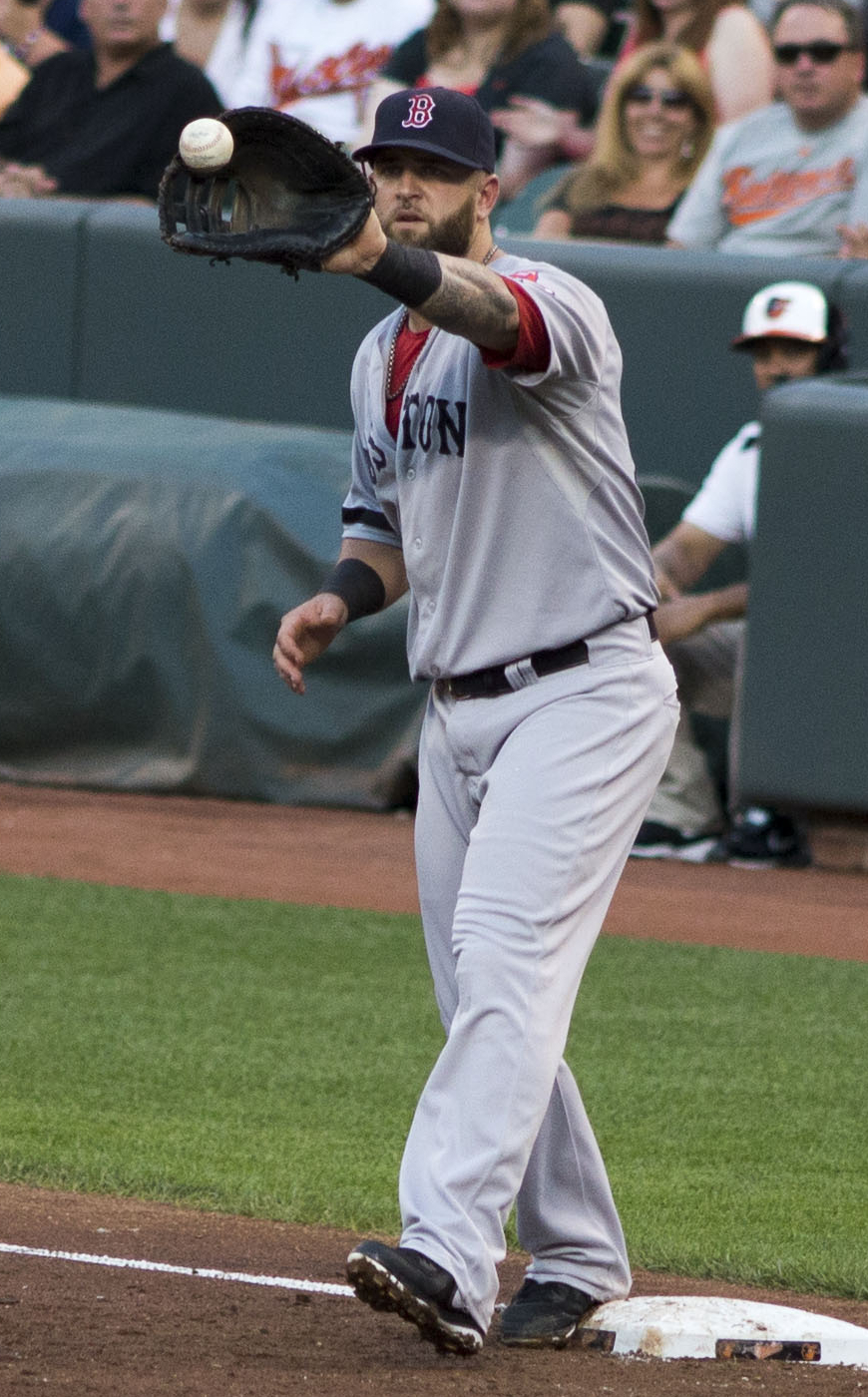
Mike Napoli hit a home run for the Rangers for the second time in the series.

=== Game 4 ===
October 23, 2011 7:05 pm (CDT) at Rangers Ballpark in Arlington, Texas 73 °F (23 °C), clear
Team	1	2	3	4	5	6	7	8	9	R	H	E
St. Louis	0	0	0	0	0	0	0	0	0	0	2	0
Texas	1	0	0	0	0	3	0	0	X	4	6	0
WP: Derek Holland (1–0) LP: Edwin Jackson (0–1); Home runs: STL: None; TEX: Mike Napoli (2); Attendance: 51,539; Boxscore

After a high-scoring affair the night before, Derek Holland quieted the Cardinals' bats as he pitched 8 1/3 innings of two-hit baseball. Lance Berkman had both of the Cardinals' two hits. Josh Hamilton's first-inning RBI double put the Rangers in front for only the second time in the Series. A three-run home run by Mike Napoli provided Holland a comfortable 4–0 lead. The Cardinals managed a small rally in the ninth, but were unable to score against closer Neftalí Feliz.

Coincidentally, this game was one of two major DFW vs. St. Louis sporting events taking place in Arlington on that day, as the NFL's Dallas Cowboys and St. Louis Rams had played at nearby Cowboys Stadium that afternoon; during the opening coin toss, Berkman and Hamilton, in uniform, had each served as honorary captains for their city's team.

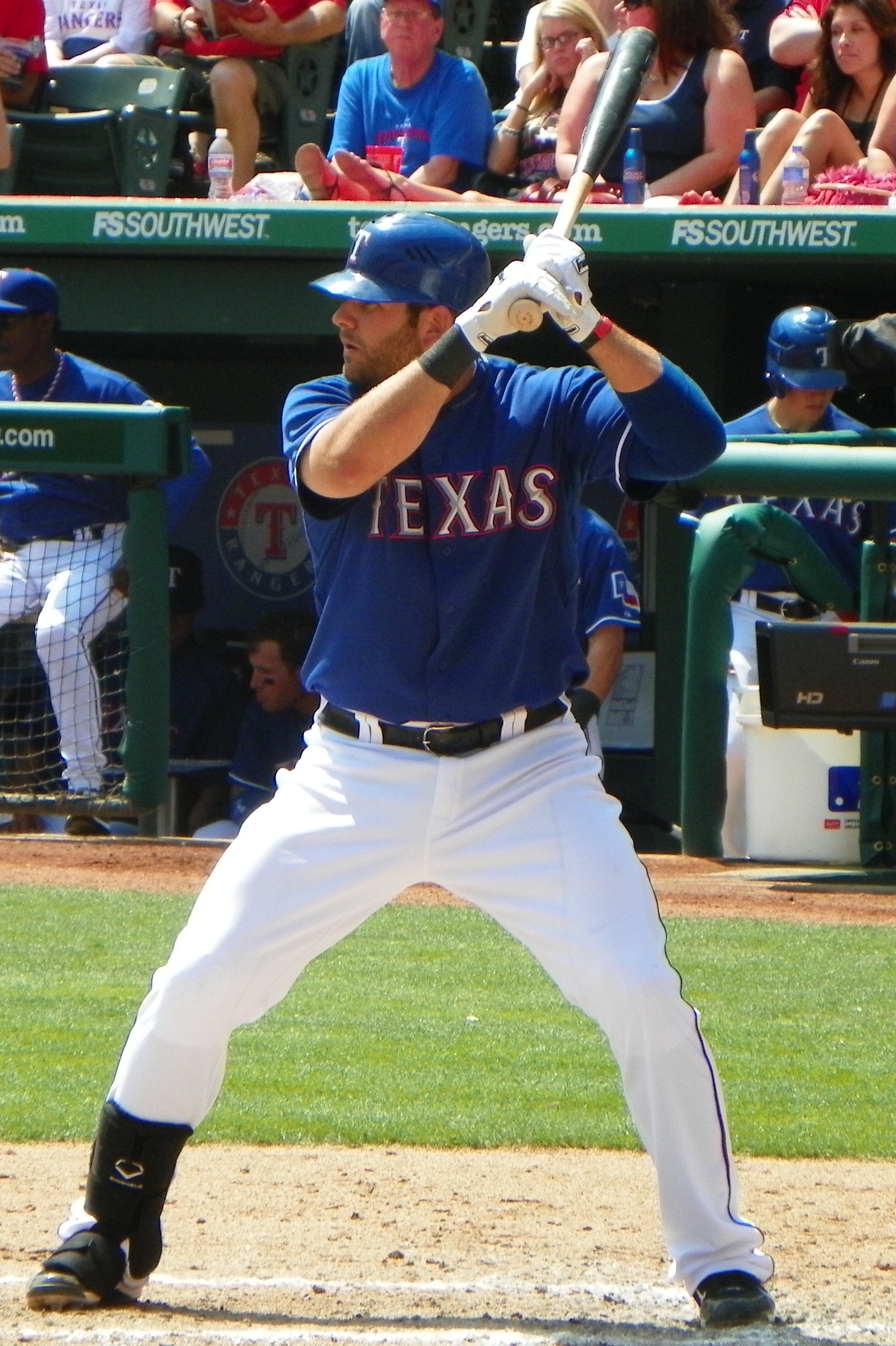
Mitch Moreland (above) and Adrián Beltré (below) hit solo home runs to tie the game up for the Rangers.

=== Game 5 ===
October 24, 2011 7:05 pm (CDT) at Rangers Ballpark in Arlington, Texas 80 °F (27 °C), mostly clear
Team	1	2	3	4	5	6	7	8	9	R	H	E
St. Louis	0	2	0	0	0	0	0	0	0	2	7	1
Texas	0	0	1	0	0	1	0	2	X	4	9	2
WP: Darren Oliver (1–0) LP: Octavio Dotel (0–1) Sv: Neftalí Feliz (2); Home runs: STL: None; TEX: Mitch Moreland (1), Adrián Beltré (1); Attendance: 51,459; Boxscore

Starters C. J. Wilson and Chris Carpenter faced off again. Wilson walked two batters, Matt Holliday and Lance Berkman, in the second inning and both came in to score, aided in part by an error by David Murphy. However, despite the Rangers walking nine batters in the game (including Albert Pujols three times intentionally), the Cardinals did not score again, leaving 12 runners on base. Mitch Moreland hit a home run in the third, and Adrián Beltré hit one in the sixth, to tie the score at 2–2.

The Rangers' half of the eighth featured a series of bullpen mix-ups by the Cardinals, leaving Tony La Russa without closer Jason Motte in a crucial situation. After Michael Young led off the inning with a double, La Russa sent both Motte (a right-hander) and left-handed reliever Marc Rzepczynski to begin warmups. However, Cardinals bullpen coach Derek Lilliquist later stated that he only heard Rzepczynski's name called. When La Russa saw that Motte was not warming up, he made a second call to the bullpen, but this time Lilliquist thought he heard La Russa call for reliever Lance Lynn, who was supposedly unavailable for the game due to throwing 47 pitches in Game 3.

Dotel intentionally walked Nelson Cruz, whereupon La Russa summoned Rzepczynski to face the left-handed hitting Murphy. Usually, the Rangers would counter with a right-handed pinch-hitter, such as Craig Gentry or Yorvit Torrealba. However, Murphy stayed in the game, and hit a grounder off Rzepczynski, loading the bases. With Motte not yet available (La Russa thought he was warming up, but he was not yet ready), La Russa was forced to match Rzepczynski against the right-handed hitting Mike Napoli, who hit a two-run double scoring Young and Cruz. After a Moreland strikeout, La Russa called for Motte from the bullpen, only to be surprised to see Lynn coming out (it was then when he learned of the mix-ups). Lynn then was asked to intentionally walk Ian Kinsler, making him only the third pitcher in World Series history to make a relief appearance solely to serve an intentional walk. After the intentional walk, Motte was finally warmed up and able to pitch. He escaped the inning by striking out Elvis Andrus.

Neftalí Feliz came in to save the game in the ninth, his second save of the Series.

=== Game 6 ===
October 27, 2011 7:05 pm (CDT) at Busch Stadium in St. Louis, Missouri 52 °F (11 °C), partly cloudy
Team	1	2	3	4	5	6	7	8	9	10	11	R	H	E
Texas	1	1	0	1	1	0	3	0	0	2	0	9	15	2
St. Louis	2	0	0	1	0	1	0	1	2	2	1	10	13	3
WP: Jake Westbrook (1–0) LP: Mark Lowe (0–1); Home runs: TEX: Adrián Beltré (2), Nelson Cruz (2), Josh Hamilton (1); STL: Lance Berkman (1), Allen Craig (2), David Freese (1); Attendance: 47,325; Boxscore

Game 6 was originally scheduled for Wednesday, October 26, but was postponed until the next day due to heavy rain in the forecast and because the stadium was not domed; this was the first time that a World Series game was postponed since 2006. Although rain was only falling fairly lightly in St. Louis when this decision was made, MLB officials did not want a repeat of Game 5 of the 2008 World Series (which was suspended after the top of the sixth inning and resumed two days later).

It was a rematch of Game 2's starters: Cardinals lefty Jaime García and Rangers starter Colby Lewis. Texas jumped on top immediately, with Josh Hamilton driving in Ian Kinsler in the top of the first. The Cardinals responded quickly with a two-run Lance Berkman home run in the bottom half. Kinsler tied the game in the top of the second with a ground-rule double, scoring Craig Gentry. García was pulled after only three innings (and 59 pitches) and replaced with Fernando Salas. Leading off the top of the fourth, Matt Holliday misplayed a Nelson Cruz pop fly, putting Cruz at second. Mike Napoli singled him home to once again give Texas the lead.

The Cardinals jumped right back in the game, taking advantage of a Michael Young error and scoring on a Yadier Molina groundout to knot the game at three. David Freese started off the top of the fifth by dropping a routine pop fly (the third consecutive half-inning to begin with an error), which immediately turned into the go-ahead run for Texas on Young's double. Colby Lewis was cruising for the Rangers until the bottom of the sixth. After an Albert Pujols strikeout, Berkman singled to third. Matt Holliday grounded into a possible double play which was mishandled at first by Michael Young (his second error of the game), leaving all runners safe. Lewis walked Freese to load the bases and was pulled for Alexi Ogando, who promptly walked Yadier Molina to force in a run. With the Cardinals in a prime position to rally ahead, Matt Holliday, standing 90 feet (27 m) away as the possible go-ahead run, was picked off at third by catcher Mike Napoli. Holliday injured his finger sliding in on the play and was forced to leave the game. After Ogando walked Nick Punto, Derek Holland came in to pitch and the Rangers were able to slip out of the inning with the score still tied.

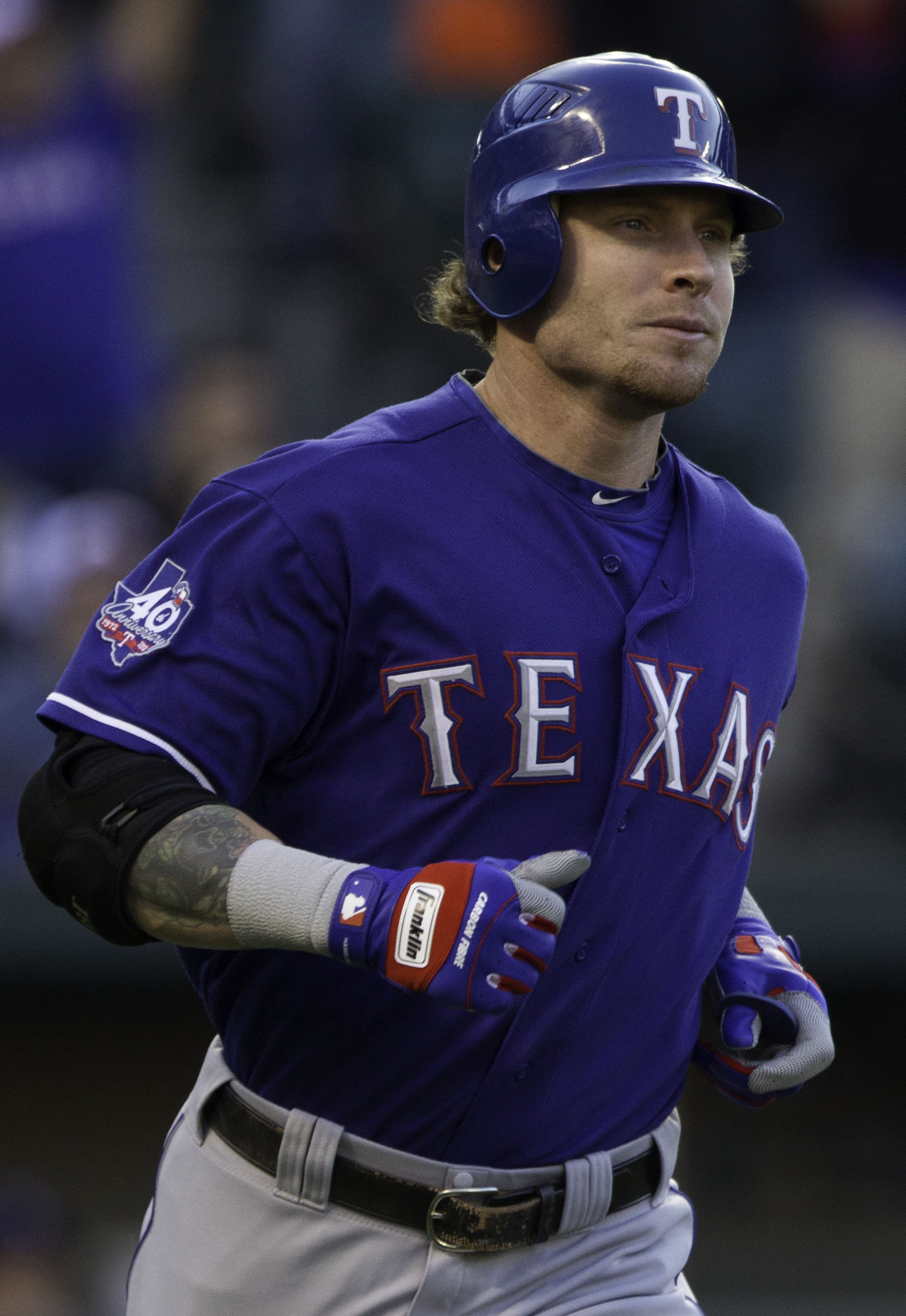
Josh Hamilton hit the go ahead two-run home run in the 10th inning for the Rangers.

Lance Lynn came on to pitch for the Cardinals in the top of the seventh and was promptly greeted with back-to-back home runs by Adrián Beltré and Nelson Cruz to put Texas up by two. The home run allowed Cruz to tie the record for most postseason home runs in a season at 8; he shares the achievement with Carlos Beltrán and Barry Bonds.

Ian Kinsler added his second RBI later in the inning to make the score 7–4, Rangers. In the bottom of the eighth, Allen Craig (who entered the game as Holliday's replacement) hit a home run to pull the Cardinals within two. Rangers closer Neftalí Feliz entered in the bottom of the ninth to deliver the Rangers their first ever World Series Championship. After striking out Ryan Theriot, Feliz faced Albert Pujols. Facing possibly his last at-bat as a Cardinal, Pujols hit Feliz's first pitch into left field for a double. Feliz walked Lance Berkman to put the tying run on first, but got Craig to take a called third strike. The Rangers were one out away from their first-ever World Series championship title as David Freese stepped to the plate. Down to his last strike, Freese hit Feliz's pitch past a leaping Nelson Cruz off the right field wall for a triple, tying the game at seven.

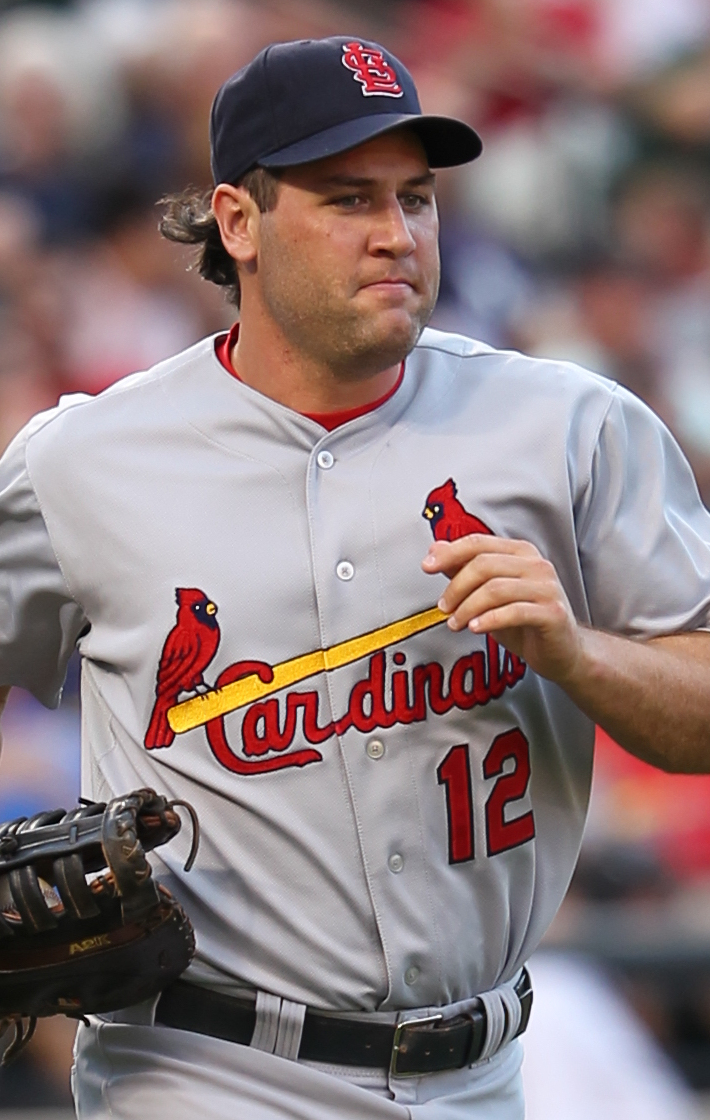
Lance Berkman, however, hit the tying single in the Cardinals' half of the 10th inning.

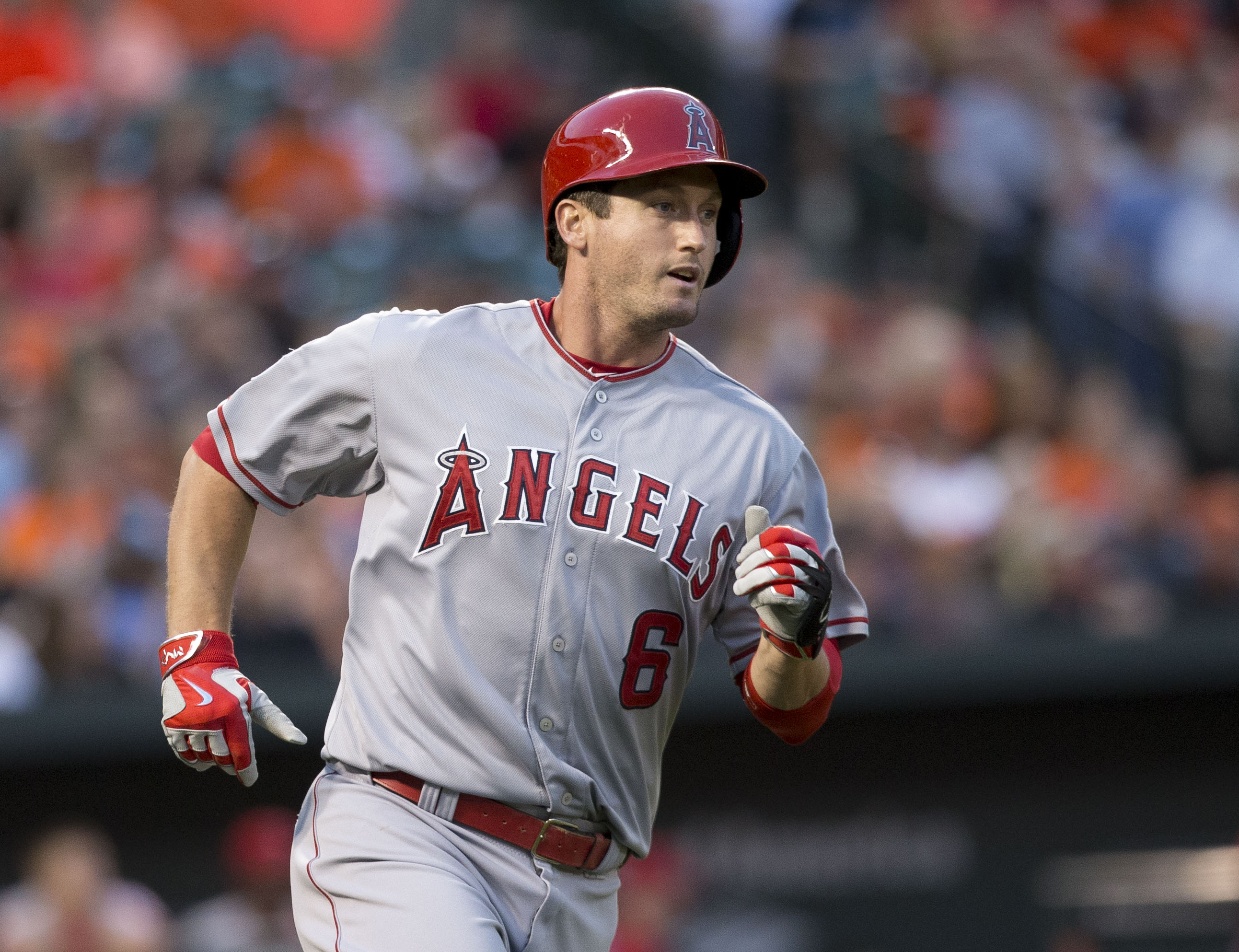
David Freese, who hit a two-RBI triple that tied the game in the 9th inning for the Cardinals, hit a solo home run in the 11th to stave off elimination for St. Louis.

However, the Cardinals could not drive Freese in as Yadier Molina lined out to Cruz for the third out.

Sent into extra innings, Jason Motte went out for his second inning of work. Elvis Andrus singled, then the Rangers' MVP candidate Josh Hamilton put Texas up again with a towering two-run home run. Down 9–7, and out of bench players, the Cardinals once again faced only three outs until elimination. Left-hander Darren Oliver came in to pitch for the Rangers to close the game. St. Louis players Daniel Descalso and Jon Jay hit back-to-back singles, and starting pitcher Kyle Lohse was called to bunt. Lohse's bunt went in the air, but over the head of a drawn-in Beltre, then falling for a successful sacrifice to put the tying runs in scoring position. With right-handers coming up, right-hander Scott Feldman replaced Oliver on the mound. Ryan Theriot's RBI groundout scored Descalso, cutting the Rangers' lead to 9–8, and following an intentional walk to Pujols, Berkman stepped up to the plate. Feldman got ahead on the count 1–2 on a foul ball. Berkman worked the count to 2–2, and the Rangers were once again one strike away from their first championship title. Berkman then smacked Feldman's next pitch into center field for a single, scoring Jay and tying the game once again. It was the first time in World Series history that a team came back from two different two-run deficits in the ninth inning or later in the same game. But again, despite Berkman advancing to second on defensive indifference and having the winning run on third in Pujols, the Cardinals failed to score when Craig grounded out to end the inning.

The Rangers failed to score in the top of the 11th against Jake Westbrook, who worked around a one-out single from Napoli. This brought David Freese to lead off the bottom of the inning against new Rangers reliever Mark Lowe, who had relieved Feldman. Freese hit Lowe's 3–2 pitch to deep center field (420 feet) and into the grass of the center field batter's eye for a game-winning home run, forcing the World Series to a Game 7 for the first time since 2002. Freese, who grew up a Cardinal fan in the suburbs of St. Louis, said that as he was circling the bases after his home run, he was thinking about a similar walk-off homer by Jim Edmonds for the Cardinals in Game 6 of the 2004 National League Championship Series in Busch Stadium II. After Freese said he remembered that home run, Lance Berkman, who played for the losing Houston Astros in that series, said "So do I."

Of the last 13 instances in which a Major League team won a Game 6 at home to force a Game 7 in the postseason, all but two went on to win Game 7. The exceptions were the New York Mets in the 2006 NLCS against, coincidentally, the Cardinals; and the Boston Red Sox in the 1975 World Series against the Cincinnati Reds.

Freese's walk-off home run was the fourth that won in a Game 6 in World Series history. Freese joined Jim Edmonds, the man for whom he was traded, as the only players in Cardinals history to hit an extra-inning walk-off home run in the postseason. He also joined Aaron Boone (2003), David Ortiz (2004) and Hall of Famers Carlton Fisk (1975) and Kirby Puckett (1991) as the only players to hit an extra-inning walk-off home run when their team was facing postseason elimination. The fan that retrieved the home run ball was subsequently given an autographed bat and ball by Freese after the former returned it to him. In Game 6, Freese posted the best win probability added in Major League Baseball postseason history, with a 0.969, which was 0.099 better than the Los Angeles Dodgers' Kirk Gibson in Game 1 of the 1988 World Series. The third- and fourth-best WPAs are .854 (by the San Diego Padres' Steve Garvey in Game 4 of the 1984 National League Championship Series) and 0.832 (by the Cardinals' Lance Berkman in Game 6 of the 2011 World Series).

The Cardinals set two World Series milestones in their Game 6 win—the first team to come back from deficits in both the 9th and 10th innings, and the first team to score in the 8th, 9th, 10th, and 11th innings. David Freese and Lance Berkman became the third and fourth players in World Series history to get game-tying hits with their team one out from elimination. It was also the first such occurrence in MLB history of a team tying a game after twice being one strike away from elimination. On Mike & Mike in the Morning the next day, ESPN senior baseball analyst Buster Olney called it the greatest game in the history of baseball.

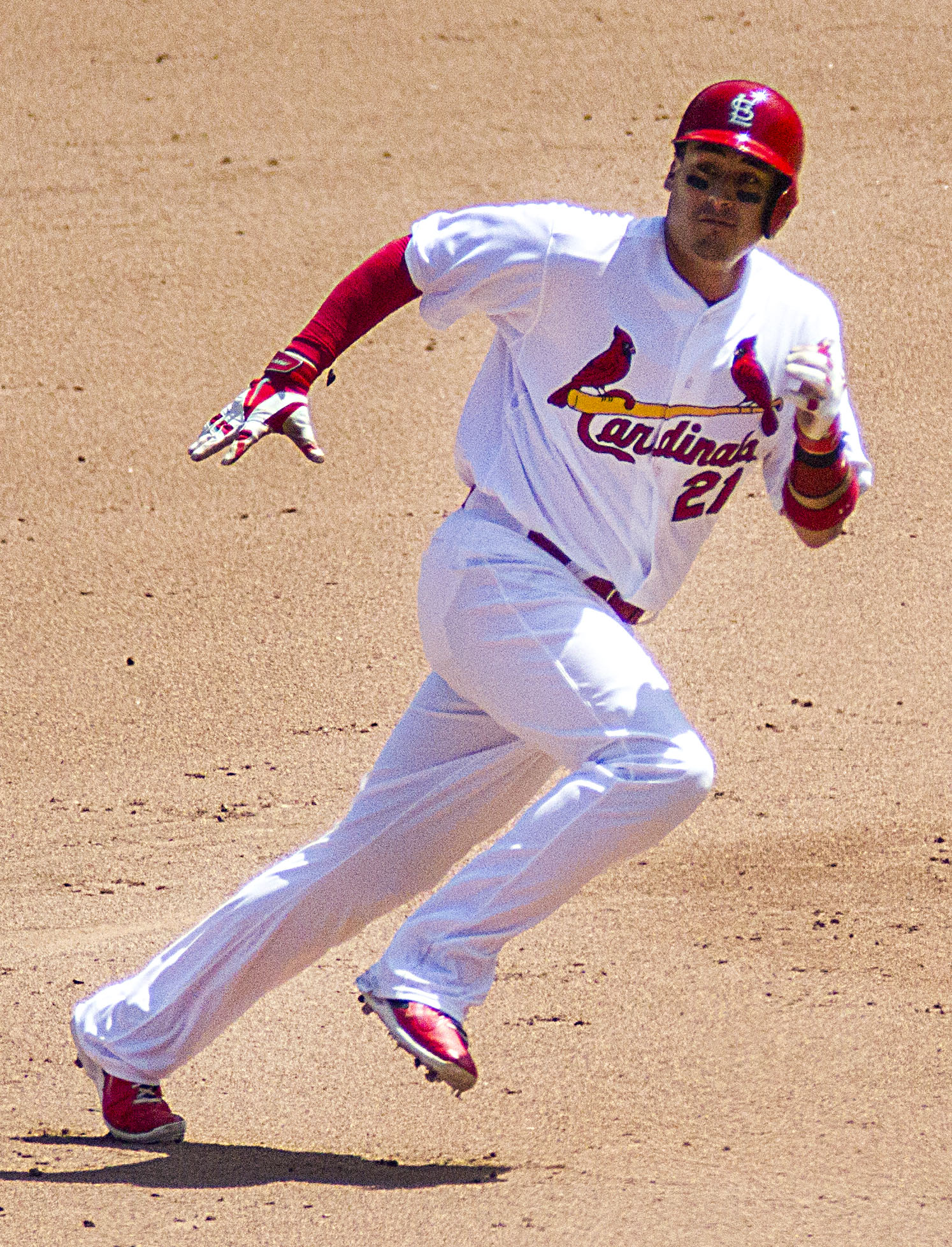
Allen Craig hit the go-ahead home run in the 3rd inning that put the Cardinals ahead for good.

=== Game 7 ===
October 28, 2011 7:05 pm (CDT) at Busch Stadium in St. Louis, Missouri 52 °F (11 °C), mostly clear
Team	1	2	3	4	5	6	7	8	9	R	H	E
Texas	2	0	0	0	0	0	0	0	0	2	6	0
St. Louis	2	0	1	0	2	0	1	0	X	6	7	1
WP: Chris Carpenter (2–0) LP: Matt Harrison (0–2); Home runs: TEX: None; STL: Allen Craig (3); Attendance: 47,399; Boxscore

Before Game 7, the Cardinals replaced Matt Holliday, who sprained his wrist in Game 6, on their roster with Adron Chambers.

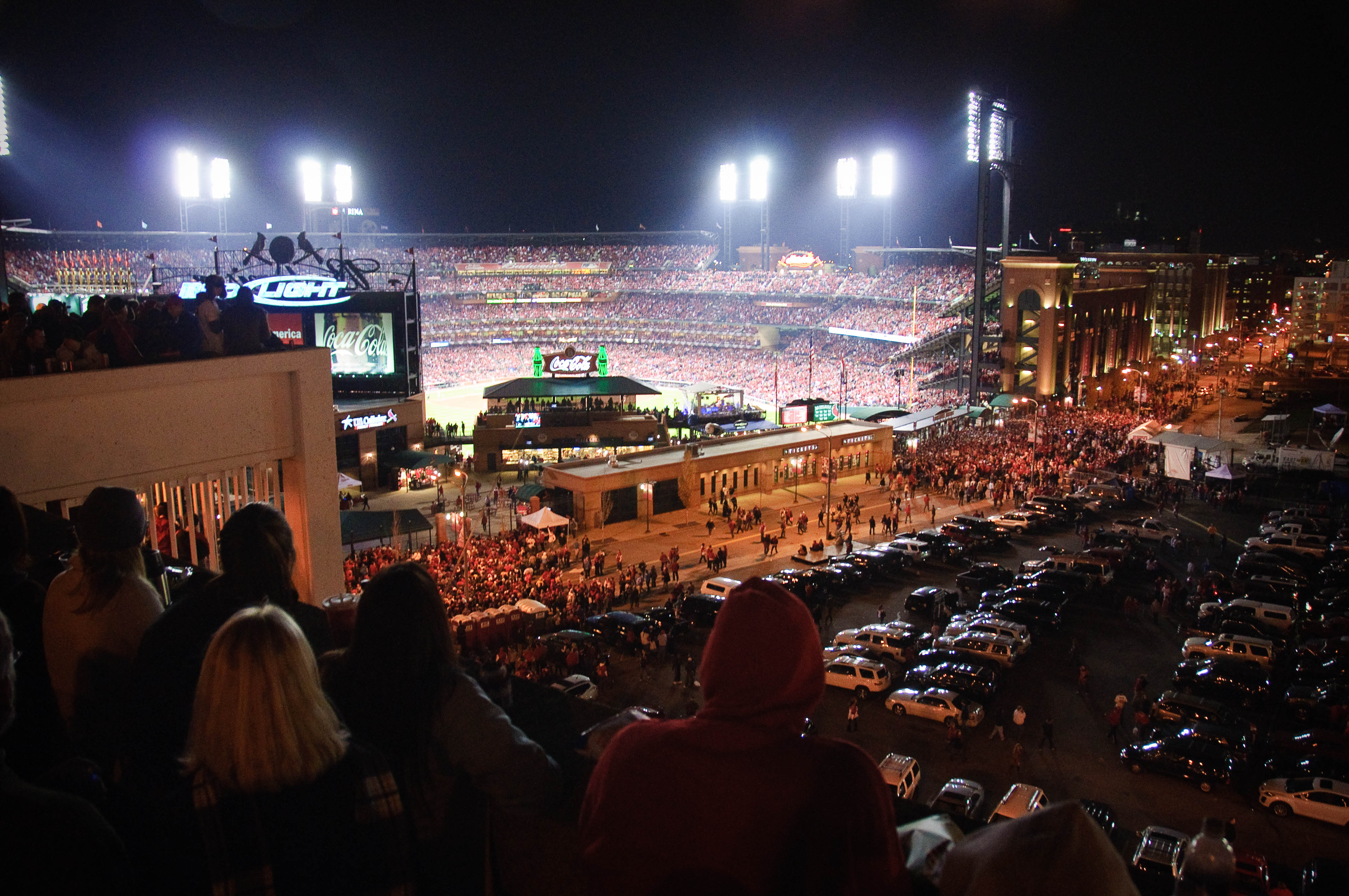
Crowds fill the stadium and parking lots during Game 7

Josh Hamilton and Michael Young had RBI doubles in the first inning against Chris Carpenter, who became the first pitcher in a decade to make three starts in one Series thanks to the unnecessary postponement of Game 6 due to forecasted rain that did not occur. David Freese had a game-tying two-run double in the bottom of the first, breaking the postseason RBI record, and Allen Craig hit a go-ahead homer in the third. Craig even robbed a home run from Nelson Cruz in the sixth. St. Louis added two runs off Scott Feldman in the fifth inning without getting a hit. Yadier Molina walked with the bases loaded, C. J. Wilson came on to relieve Feldman and promptly hit Rafael Furcal with his first pitch, forcing in another run to make it 5–2. In the seventh inning, Lance Berkman scored on a Molina single to make it 6–2.

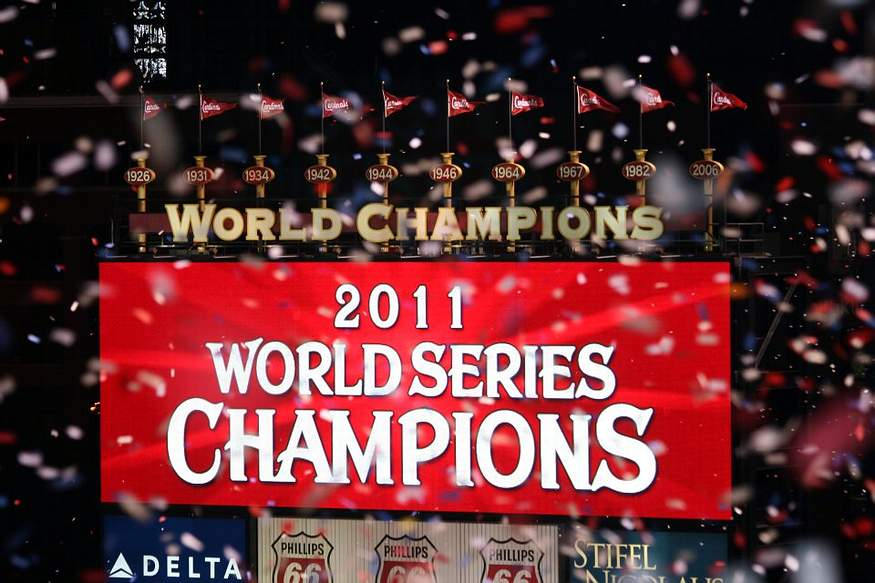
Busch Stadium scoreboard after Game 7.

Chris Carpenter was relieved after pitching six innings and was credited with the win in yet another quality outing. The Cardinals used four relievers to hold Texas scoreless over the final three innings. The final out was recorded when Jason Motte got David Murphy to fly out to Cardinal left fielder Allen Craig as Busch Stadium went into a frenzy.

David Freese became the sixth player in history to earn League Championship Series and World Series MVP awards in the same postseason. Freese also won the Babe Ruth Award as the postseason MVP. In Game 7 of the World Series, Freese hit a two-run double in the bottom of the first inning, bringing his 2011 postseason RBI total to 21, an MLB record.

The Rangers set a Series record by issuing 41 walks, breaking the previous record held by the Florida Marlins when winning the 1997 World Series after issuing 40.

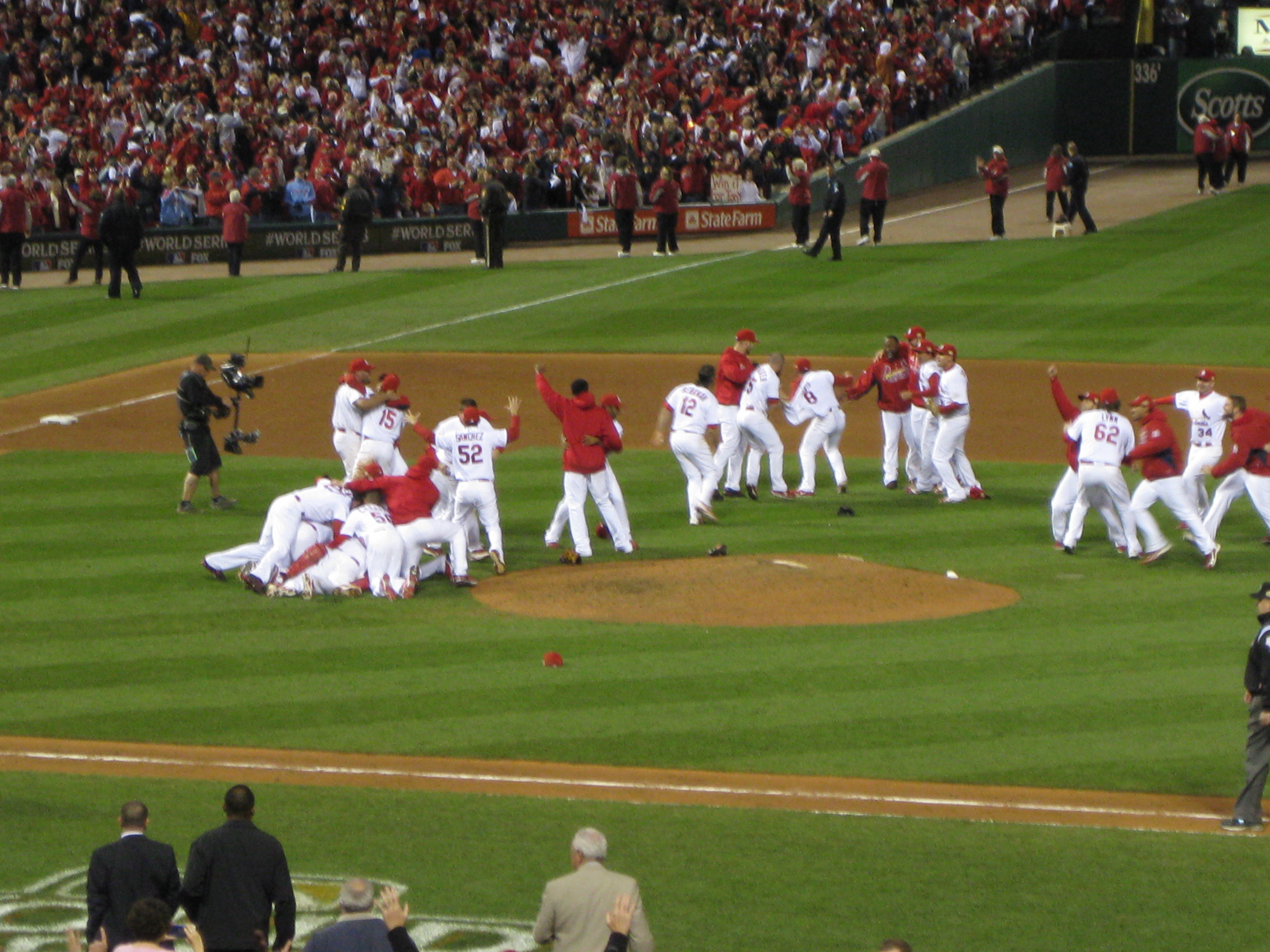
Cardinals players celebrate after winning their franchise's 11th World Series title.

The Rangers became the first team to lose in the World Series in consecutive years since the Atlanta Braves in 1991 and 1992 and the first American League team to do so since the New York Yankees in 1963 and 1964. The Cardinals meanwhile, became the first wild card team to win the World Series since the Boston Red Sox won the 2004 World Series (coincidentally, against the Cardinals).

== Composite line score ==
2011 World Series (4–3): St. Louis Cardinals (N.L.) over Texas Rangers (A.L.)

Team	1	2	3	4	5	6	7	8	9	10	11	R	H	E
St. Louis Cardinals	5	2	1	7	5	6	4	2	3	2	1	38	56	6
Texas Rangers	4	1	1	4	6	4	4	2	2	2	0	30	60	8
Total attendance: 342,878 Average attendance: 48,983; Winning player's share: $323,169.98 Losing player's share: $251,515.76

== Broadcasting ==
=== Television ===
The series was televised in the United States and Canada by Fox. Joe Buck called play-by-play on his 14th World Series for the network, dating back to 1996, while color analyst Tim McCarver handled his 22nd World Series since 1985. Ken Rosenthal served as field reporter for the games, while Chris Rose hosted the pregame and postgame coverage with analysts A. J. Pierzynski and Eric Karros.

Joe Buck's call of "...we will see you tomorrow night!" on David Freese's walk-off home run echoed his father Jack's call of Kirby Puckett's walk-off home run from Game 6 of the 1991 World Series, occurring 20 years and a day apart from each other, given the similar situations: Game 6, 11th inning, first batter of the final inning, and breaking a 3–3 tie to win the game 4–3, and extend the series to a 7th game.

MLB International syndicated television coverage of the Series (with Gary Thorne and Rick Sutcliffe announcing) to viewers outside of North America.

==== Ratings ====
The ratings started off poorly, averaging just 8.4 through its first 5 games (at this time, the record for lowest World Series rating was 8.4, set by five games of the 2008 World Series and five games of the 2010 World Series). Game 3 also produced a 6.6 rating, making it the second lowest World Series rated game of all-time (behind the 6.1 rating in Game 3 of the 2008 World Series and Game 3 of the 2012 World Series).

However, Games 6 and 7 generated massive ratings that brought the overall average to 9.9. The 14.7 rating for Game 7 was at the time Fox's highest for a World Series telecast since Game 4 of the 2004 World Series.

Game	Ratings (households)	Share (households)	American audience (in millions)
1	8.7	14	14.2
2	8.9	14	14.3
3	6.6	12	11.2
4	9.2	14	15.2
5	8.8	14	14.3
6	12.7	21	21.1
7	14.7	25	25.4

=== Radio ===
ESPN Radio also broadcast the games nationally. This was the first World Series for play-by play announcer Dan Shulman and analysts Orel Hershiser and Bobby Valentine. ESPN Deportes Radio aired the Series for Spanish language listeners, with Ernesto Jerez and Guillermo Celis announcing.

Locally, the two teams' flagship stations broadcast the Series with their respective announcing crews. The Rangers' broadcasts aired on KESN (with Eric Nadel and Steve Busby announcing), while the Cardinals' broadcasts aired on KMOX (with Mike Shannon and John Rooney announcing). Due to contractual obligations, the non-flagship stations on the teams' radio networks carried the ESPN Radio broadcasts of the games, although the local broadcasts were available on XM Satellite Radio and to Gameday Audio subscribers at MLB.com.

In the United Kingdom, Simon Brotherton and Josh Chetwynd called the games for BBC Radio 5 Live Sports Extra.

== Aftermath ==
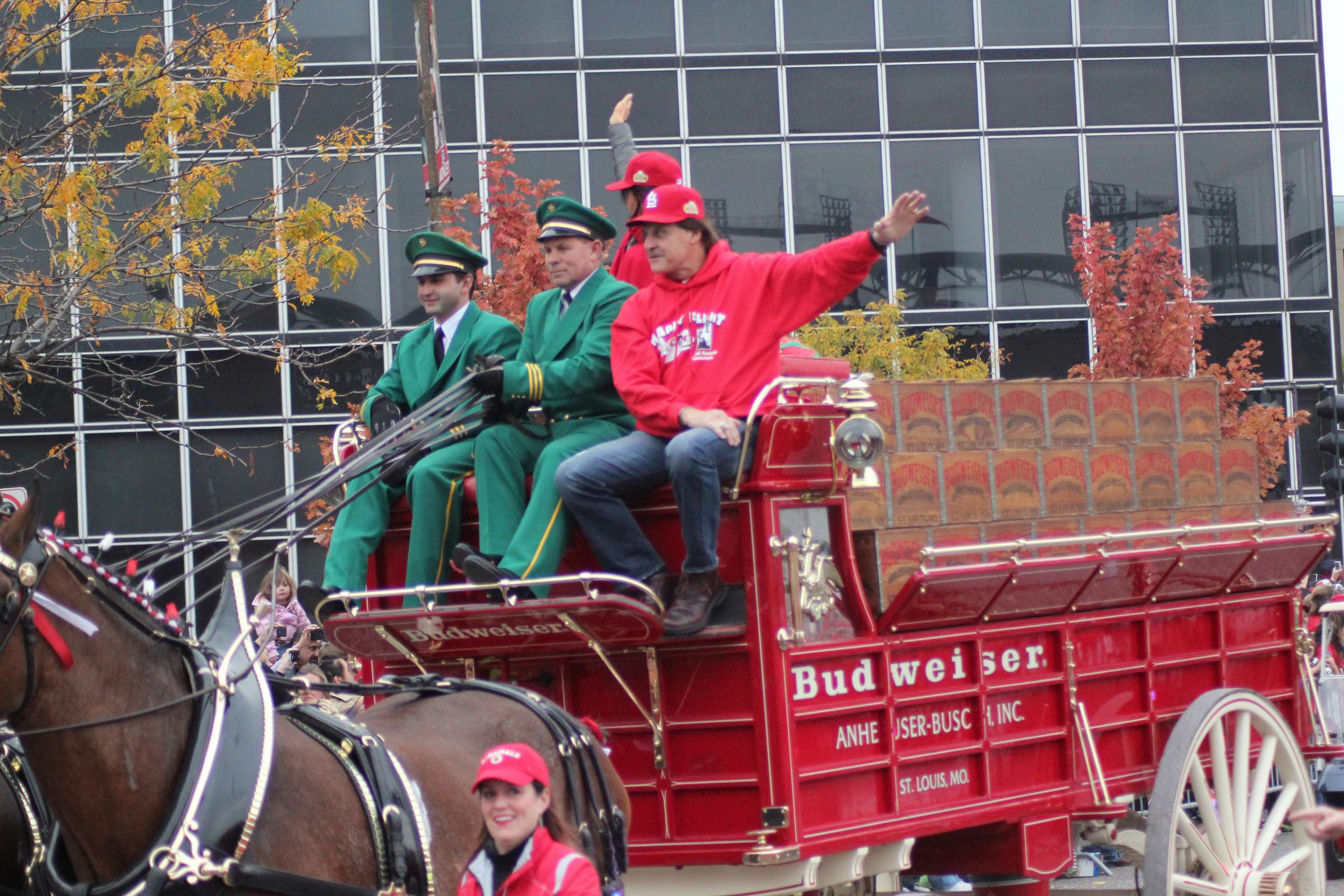
La Russa during the World Series parade.

The 2011 World Series was only the second World Series ever in which the winning team was a strike away from elimination twice in Game 6 and trailed early in Game 7 before coming back to win. The first was the 1986 World Series, in which the New York Mets rallied from a 5–3 deficit in the bottom of the tenth inning of Game 6 to win and the decisive Game 7 after being ten outs away from elimination. As such, the 2011 World Series was remembered as an instant classic. David Freese's heroics in Game 6 is widely considered the greatest moment in St. Louis Cardinals history. As of 2026, the 2011 Cardinals remain the most recent team to win Game 7 of the World Series at home, as the next five Fall Classics that went the full seven games (2014, 2016, 2017, 2019, 2025) were won by the road team.

This was the third and final World Series title for Cardinals manager Tony La Russa, who initially announced his retirement on October 31, 2011, after 33 seasons as a major league manager. This made him the first manager to end his career with a World Series win and with the most managerial victories (1,408) in franchise history. La Russa had previously led the Cardinals (2006) and Oakland Athletics (1989) to World Series championships. Former Cardinals catcher Mike Matheny, who played for the 2004 Cardinals that lost the World Series, was hired to replace him. He would be inducted into the National Baseball Hall of Fame in 2014. La Russa later came out of retirement and served as manager of the Chicago White Sox in 2021 and 2022.

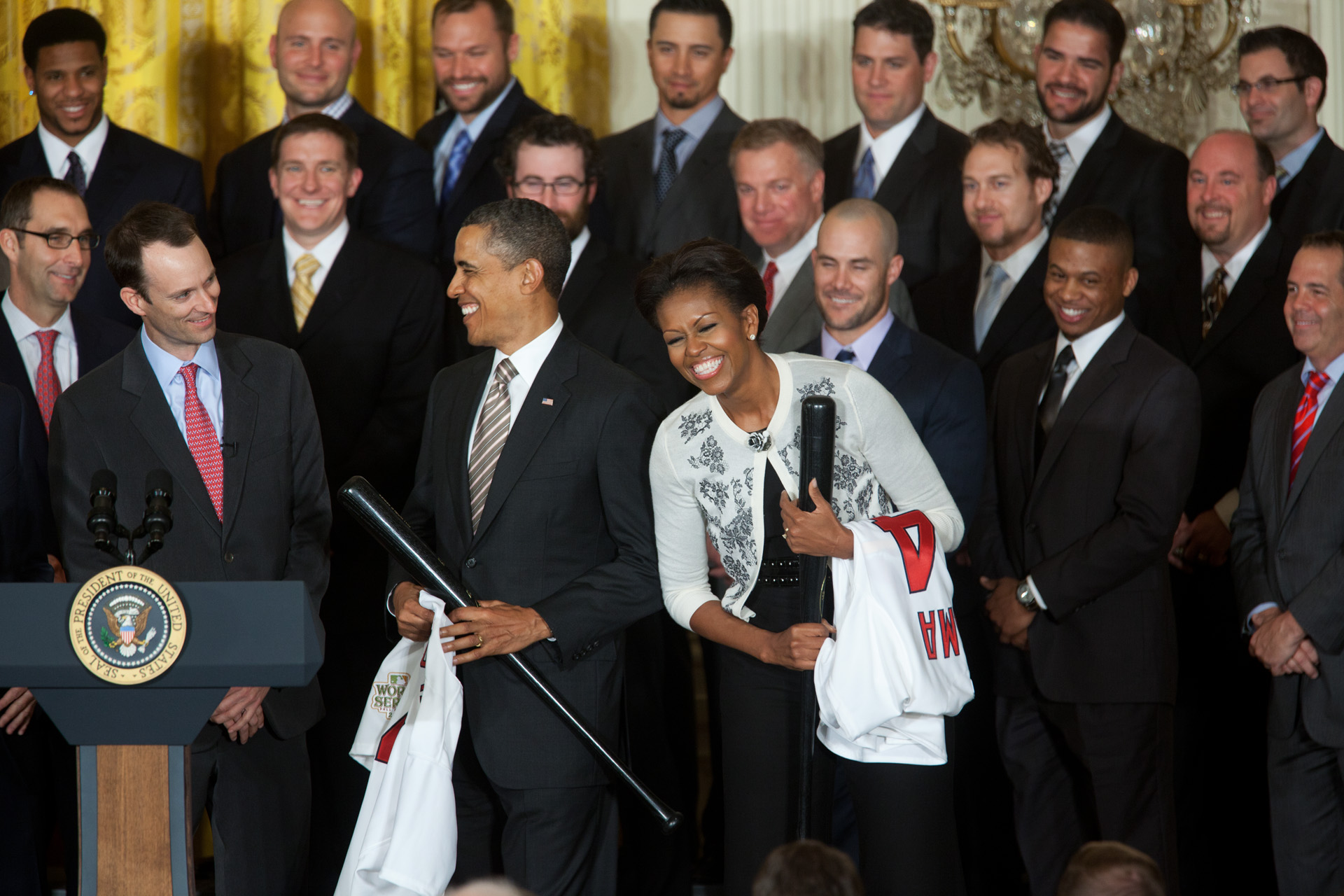
The president and first lady welcome the 2011 Cardinals to the White House

After the New York Giants won Super Bowl XLVI during the offseason, some news organizations, among them The St. Louis Post-Dispatch, compared the Cardinals to the Giants, invoking Al Michaels's call of the Giants winning the Super Bowl: "The New York Giants, given the last rites by many in December, are the Super Bowl Champs in February."

On December 7, the Houston Astros hired Jeff Luhnow as their general manager, culminating his rise through the Cardinals ranks as a top player developer. Baseball America would bestow the Cardinals with their Organization of the Year award for the first time, an award given since 1982. It was given in part to recognize the increased productivity of the Cardinals farm system. Seventeen of the 25 players on the Cardinals' 2011 postseason roster were drafted and developed by the Cardinals. Along with Luhnow, John Mozeliak helped fulfill owner Bill DeWitt Jr.'s mission to make Cardinals' farm system a consistent producer of prospects who would be key in the club's success. Luhnow helped rebuild the Astros, culminating in a championship in 2017; however, he would later be temporarily banned from MLB due to his role in the Houston Astros sign stealing scandal in 2020.

Albert Pujols and C. J. Wilson signed with the Los Angeles Angels of Anaheim in the offseason, in one of the deepest free-agent classes in recent MLB history, while the Rangers obtained the rights to sign Japanese star pitcher Yu Darvish to replace Wilson. In his first press conference as a Ranger, Darvish was asked about Game 6 of the World Series where David Freese hit a walk-off home run in the bottom of the 11th, and said "If it was last year [2011], I would have given up a home run and lost the game. This year [2012] I won't let that happen." Pujols returned to the Cardinals in 2022, which was the last season of his career.

Both teams would advance into the postseason again in the following year, both as wild cards. The Rangers lost to the Baltimore Orioles in the inaugural American League Wild Card game, and would not make the postseason again until 2015. The Cardinals won the inaugural National League Wild Card game against Atlanta. They then defeated the Washington Nationals in the NLDS before falling to the San Francisco Giants in the NLCS.

St. Louis would return to the World Series in 2013, continuing the pattern of Giants and Cardinals exchanging pennant victories. However, the Cardinals lost to the Boston Red Sox in six games before losing to San Francisco again in the 2014 NLCS, 4 games to 1.

The Series marked the beginning of a decade in which all current Missouri-based teams in the four major American sports leagues would win a championship. The Kansas City Royals won the 2015 World Series, the St. Louis Blues won the 2019 Stanley Cup Finals, and the Kansas City Chiefs won Super Bowl LIV following the 2019 season.

10 years after the 2011 World Series, Ron Washington would finally win a World Series ring after 44 years in MLB, as he served as the third base coach for the Atlanta Braves. In addition, four players from the 2011 Rangers' World Series team later won a world championship with the Boston Red Sox: Mike Napoli and Koji Uehara in 2013, and Ian Kinsler and Mitch Moreland in 2018.

"May the ghosts of 2011 be forever erased!"

— Rangers radio announcer Eric Nadel, after the Rangers won the 2023 World Series

The Rangers returned to the World Series again in 2023, where they finally won it all as they defeated the Arizona Diamondbacks 4 games to 1 to clinch their first title in franchise history. Pitching coach Mike Maddux was on the coaching staff for all of Texas' World Series appearances, having served under Washington for the first two before he was rehired under Bruce Bochy during the third. When the Rangers won Game 5 to win the championship, Rangers radio play-by-play announcer Eric Nadel made a reference to the series by saying "May the ghosts of 2011 be forever erased!" all while claiming that Ranger fans were "not dreaming".

== See also ==
- 2011 Asia Series
- 2011 Japan Series
- 2011 Korean Series
- Curse of Bob Short
