= Tony Granadillo =

Venezuelan baseball player

- Infielder
- Born: August 10, 1984 (age 41); Valencia, Carabobo, Venezuela
- Bats: right Throws: right
- Stats at Baseball Reference

Antonio J. Granadillo (born August 10, 1984, at Valencia, Carabobo, Venezuela) is a former professional baseball infielder.

== Professional career ==
Granadillo was signed by the St. Louis Cardinals on May 1, 2001, as an undrafted free agent. He started his professional career in 2004 playing for the Johnson City Cardinals of the Appalachian League. He was selected Appalachian League All-Star 3B during the year.

In December 2004 he was acquired by the Red Sox in the Rule 5 draft in the minor league phase. In 2005 and 2006, he spent time with the Gulf Coast Red Sox and Greenville Bombers. In 2007, he played for the Lancaster JetHawks.

In 2008, Granadillo was invited to participate in the Red Sox spring training major league camp. He was reassigned to minor league camp on March 8. He spent the season mostly with the Portland Sea Dogs, and became a free agent at the end of the season. He was not picked up as a free agent, which ended his stateside professional career. Granadillo participated in the 2011 Baseball World Cup for Venezuela.

== Awards and recognition ==
- 2004 Appalachian League All-Star
- 2007 California League All-Star
