= Adam Wainwright =

American baseball player (born 1981)

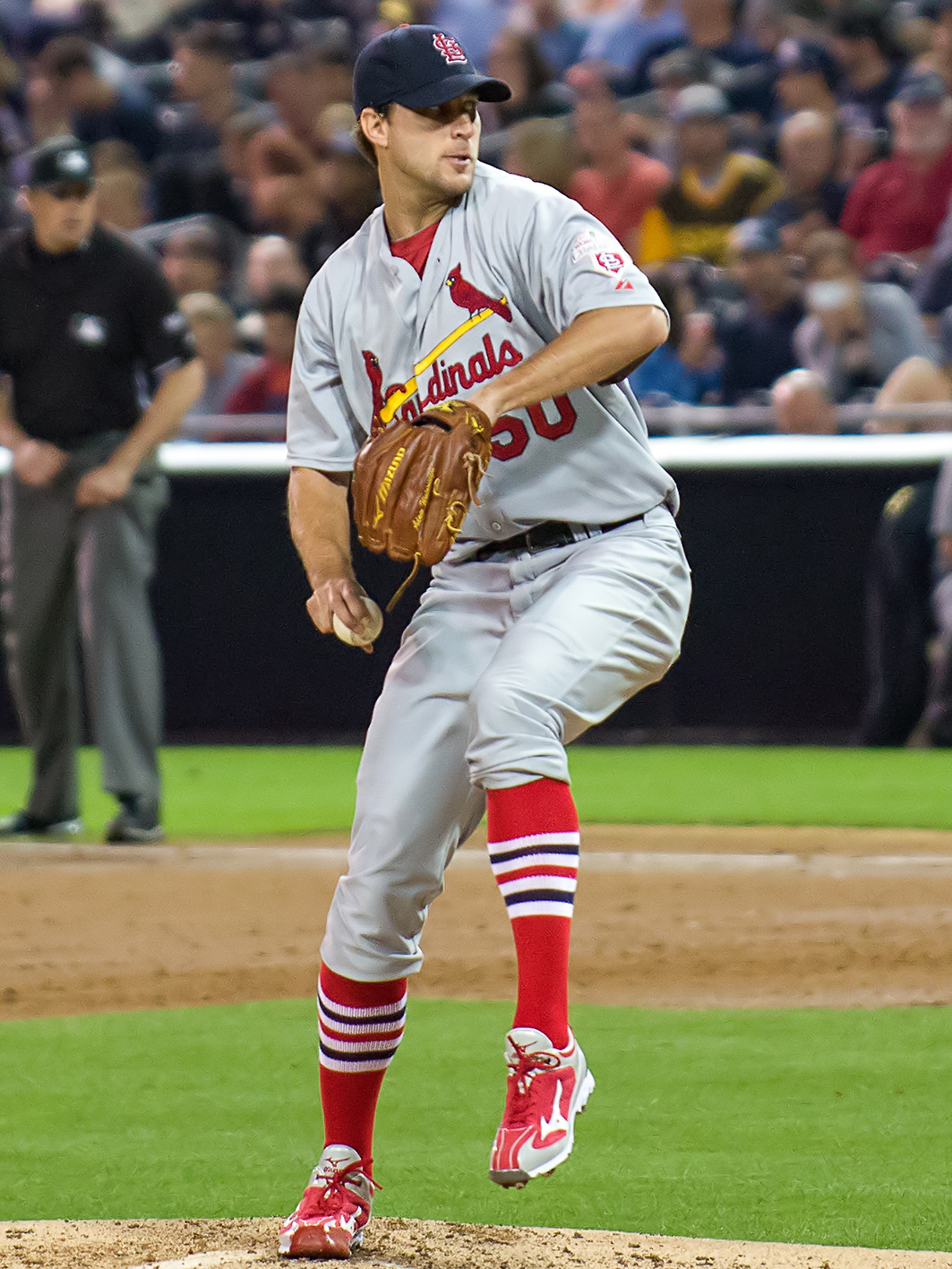
- Wainwright with the St. Louis Cardinals in 2012
- Pitcher
- Born: August 30, 1981 (age 45); Brunswick, Georgia, U.S.
- Batted: Right Threw: Right

MLB debut
- September 11, 2005, for the St. Louis Cardinals

Last MLB appearance
- October 1, 2023, for the St. Louis Cardinals

MLB statistics
- Win–loss record: 200–128
- Earned run average: 3.53
- Strikeouts: 2,202
- Stats at Baseball Reference

Teams
- St. Louis Cardinals (2005–2010, 2012–2023)

Career highlights and awards
- 3× All-Star (2010, 2013, 2014); World Series champion (2006); 2× Gold Glove Award (2009, 2013); Silver Slugger Award (2017); Roberto Clemente Award (2020); 2× NL wins leader (2009, 2013)
Medals
Men's baseball
Representing United States
World Baseball Classic
| Silver medal – second place | 2023 Miami | Team |

Adam Parrish Wainwright (born August 30, 1981), nicknamed "Waino" and "Uncle Charlie", is an American former professional baseball pitcher who spent his entire 18-year Major League Baseball (MLB) career with the St. Louis Cardinals.

The Atlanta Braves selected Wainwright 29th overall in the first round of the 2000 MLB draft from Glynn Academy in Brunswick, Georgia. His performance in the minor leagues made him one of the Braves' top pitching prospects. After the 2003 season, the Braves traded him to the Cardinals for outfielder J. D. Drew.

Wainwright made his MLB debut on September 11, 2005, and spent the rest of the season as a relief pitcher. The next year, he briefly assumed closer duties, saving the series-clinching games of the 2006 National League Championship Series and the World Series over the Detroit Tigers. In 2007, he returned to starting pitching, a role in which he would remain for the rest of his career. He missed the 2011 season due to Tommy John surgery, but emerged as an ace, leading the National League multiple times in wins, innings pitched, and games started. He also has multiple top-ten finishes in earned run average, strikeouts, walks plus hits per inning pitched, and complete games. In 2014, Wainwright became the first pitcher in major league history to post nine of his first 18 starts with seven innings pitched and no runs allowed. In his career, Wainwright won 200 games, received three All-Star selections and two Gold Glove Awards, and finished in the top three in the Cy Young Award balloting four times.

With 2,202 career strikeouts, Wainwright is second to Bob Gibson (3,117) in Cardinals franchise history. Wainwright and longtime teammate Yadier Molina are the most successful battery in major league history, having both the most wins and starts together.

On September 18, 2023, Wainwright became the third Cardinals' pitcher to win 200 games, joining Bob Gibson (251), and Jesse Haines (210), and the 122nd in baseball history. That day, he also became the 66th pitcher in baseball history with at least 2,200 strikeouts.

== Early life ==
Wainwright was born in Brunswick, Georgia. His father was an attorney, and his mother was a real estate agent. His parents divorced when he was seven years old, and his father moved to Florida, leaving Wainwright's mother to raise him and his older brother, who grew up to become an attorney in Atlanta. Wainwright credits his older brother with teaching him everything he knows about sports after their father left, including building a pitcher's mound in their back yard to teach him how to pitch. Wainwright also participated in the Cub Scouts, Boy Scouts, and numerous church activities. He grew up an Atlanta Braves fan.

=== High school ===
Wainwright attended high school at Glynn Academy in Brunswick, where he was an athletic and academic standout. With a fastball over 90 mph and batting average at times over .500, Wainwright was named Gatorade Georgia Player of the Year in 2000. He also played football, in which he was named to the All-State team as a wide receiver his junior and senior years as well as All-Region honors as a placekicker. Several universities, including Georgia Tech, offered him academic and baseball scholarships.

== Professional career ==
=== Draft and minor leagues (2000–05) ===
==== Atlanta Braves organization (2000–03) ====
The Atlanta Braves selected Wainwright 29th overall in the first round of the 2000 MLB draft, using a compensatory pick from the Arizona Diamondbacks for signing Russ Springer in the offseason. Wainwright chose to forgo college, signing a contract that included a $1.25 million bonus. The Braves had been his favorite team growing up. Less than two weeks after high school graduation, Wainwright reported to the Braves rookie team and soon advanced to Atlanta's Class A Danville Braves in the Appalachian League. He pitched for the Macon Braves in the South Atlantic League in 2001, where he broke the team record for strikeouts, previously held by Bruce Chen, with 184.

Wainwright spent the 2002 season in the Carolina League and also participated in that season's All-Star Futures Game. In 2003, Wainwright advanced to the Double-A Greenville Braves. He was Baseball America's top Braves prospect in 2003.

=== St. Louis Cardinals (2005–2023) ===
In December 2003, the St. Louis Cardinals acquired Wainwright and pitchers Jason Marquis and Ray King in a trade that sent outfielder J. D. Drew and utility player Eli Marrero to Atlanta.

Wainwright pitched just 12 games for the Triple-A Memphis Redbirds in 2004 before he was shut down for nearly the entire rest of the season with an elbow strain. He had a 4–4 win–loss record (W–L) with a 5.37 earned run average (ERA) in 63 2/3 innings pitched (IP). He struck out 64 batters and allowed 68 hits and 28 walks (BB). In the Arizona Fall League, he returned to pitch 10 innings. He spent the next season with Memphis, starting 29 games, going 10–10 and allowing 204 hits and 51 walks while striking out 147 in 182 innings. After two somewhat uneven seasons in the Cardinals' minor league system, Wainwright made his MLB debut for St. Louis on September 11, 2005.

==== 2006 ====
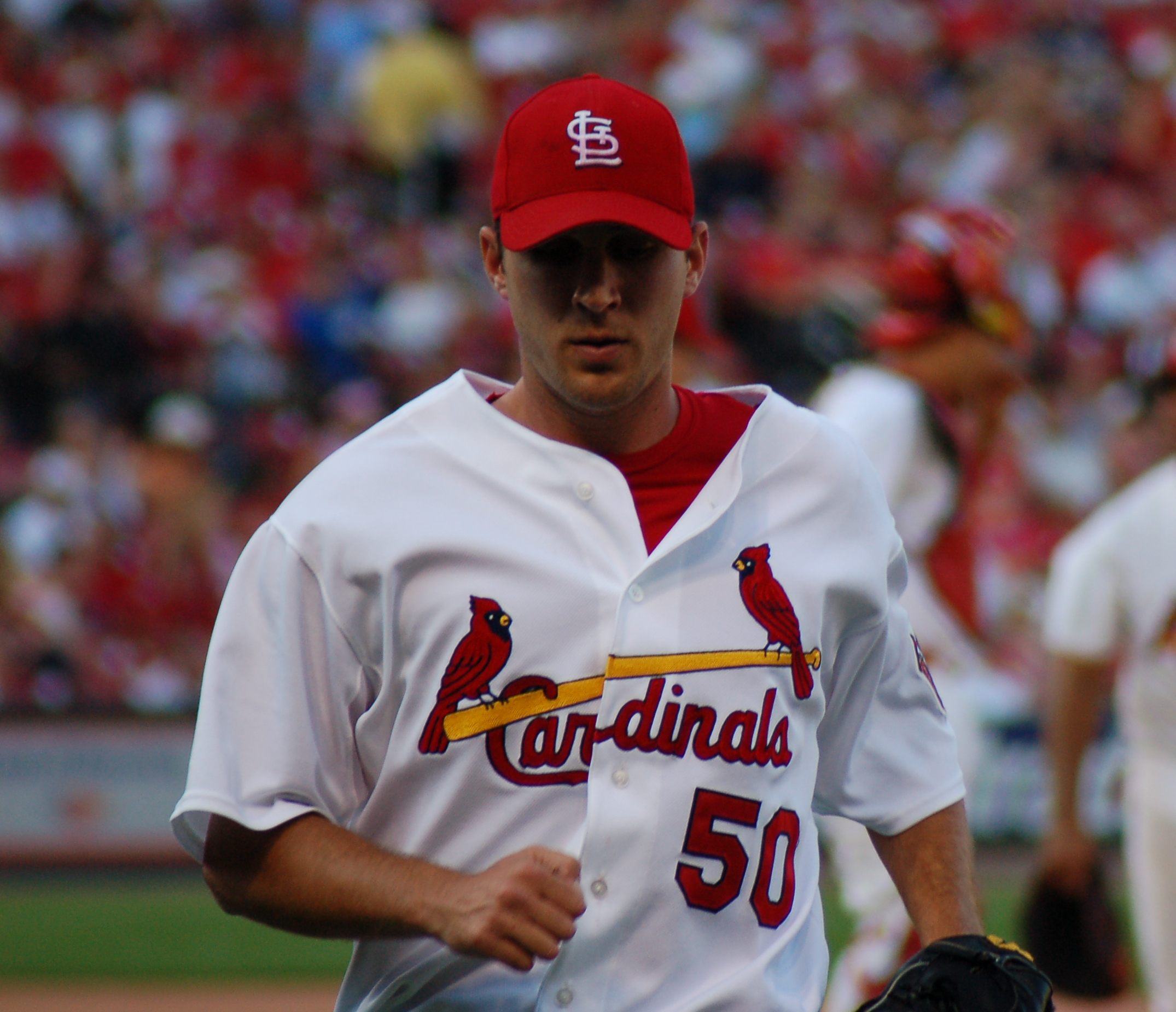
Wainwright in 2006, his first full season

Wainwright made the Cardinals' Opening Day roster as a relief pitcher after having been a starter for his entire minor league career. On May 24, 2006, he hit a home run on the first pitch he saw as batter in the major leagues against the San Francisco Giants' Noah Lowry; he became the 22nd batter, and only the seventh pitcher, in Major League history and 11th National Leaguer to hit a home run off the first pitch thrown in his first at-bat.

Wainwright pitched capably as a middle reliever, but when incumbent closer Jason Isringhausen underwent season-ending hip surgery in September, Wainwright was pressed into service as the closer. He saved two crucial games on September 27 and 30 as St. Louis held off the Houston Astros' late charge and won the NL Central Division championship. Despite their unexceptional 83–78 regular-season record, the Cardinals rolled through October to win the 10th world championship in franchise history. As the closer, Wainwright closed out the final game of the Cardinals' National League Division Series, ending the San Diego Padres’ season and propelling the Cardinals to the 2006 National League Championship Series, where he famously struck out Carlos Beltrán in Game 7 to defeat the New York Mets and send the Cardinals to the World Series. In Game 5 of the 2006 World Series, Wainwright struck out Detroit Tigers third baseman Brandon Inge to win the championship.

==== 2007 ====
Wainwright moved from the bullpen to the starting rotation for 2007. Shortly after losing ace Chris Carpenter for the year due to elbow surgery, Wainwright emerged as the Cardinals' most reliable starter. On August 10, he threw the first complete game of his career, a 2–1 loss to Los Angeles, and the only nine-inning complete game for the Cardinals that season. By September, Wainwright had established himself as the staff ace in Carpenter's absence, going 9–6 with a 2.94 ERA from mid-May to the end of the season. He finished his first year by leading the club in almost every pitching category—games started, innings pitched, strikeouts, and wins—while compiling a 3.70 ERA and a 14–12 record. His 14 wins were the most in franchise history for a first-year starter. His 2.71 ERA after the All-Star break was third-best in the NL.

==== 2008 ====
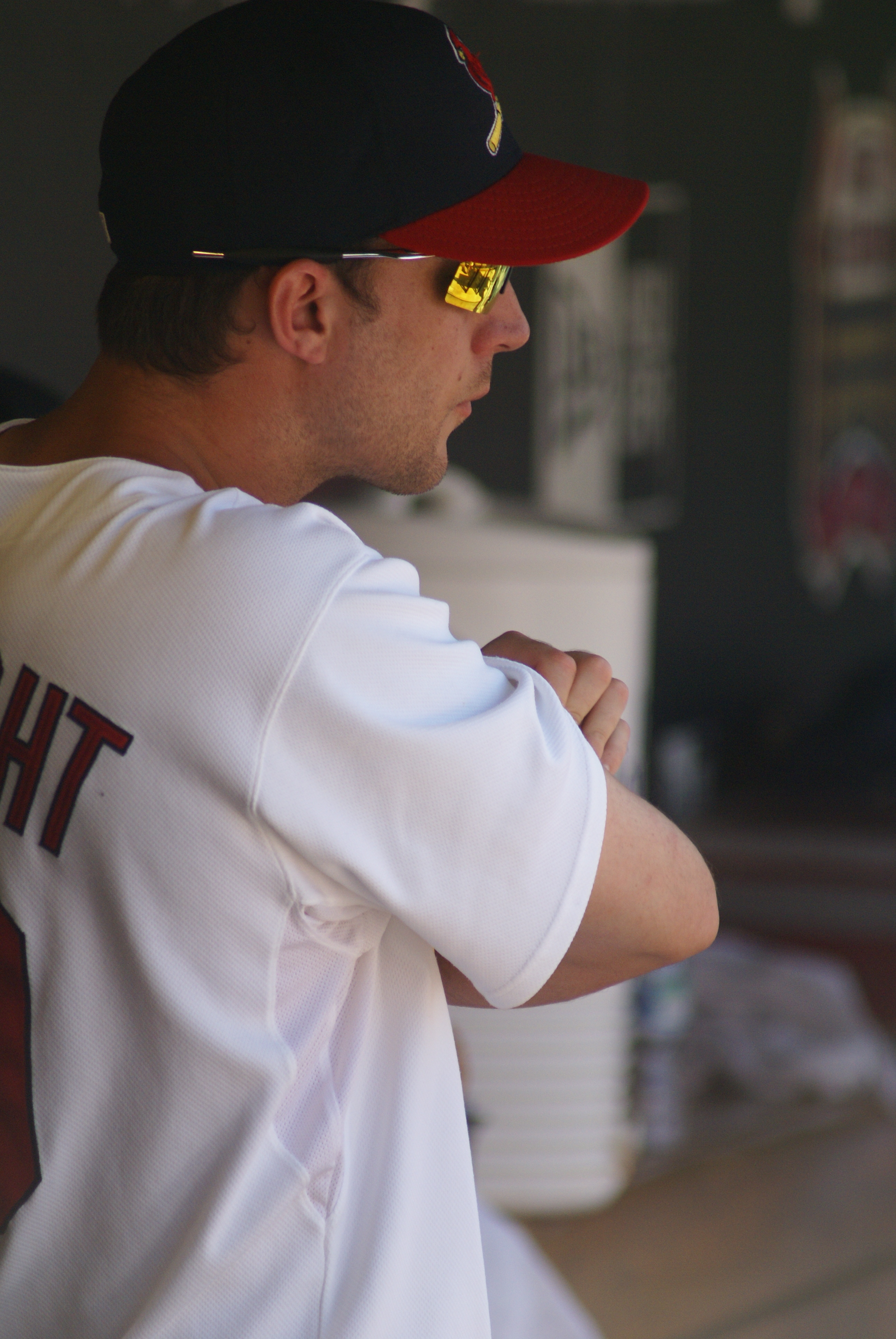
Wainwright in the dugout.

In March 2008, Wainwright signed a four-year deal with the Cardinals worth $21 million, with two club options for 2012 and 2013 that made the potential aggregate value $36 million. He gave up four runs or less in each of his first seven starts. However, the Cardinals lost to the Brewers 8–3 in Wainwright's eighth start, on May 13, as Ryan Braun hit two home runs off him. He suffered a strain on the middle finger of his pitching hand in June, causing him to miss 2 1/2 months of the season. In 20 starts, he finished 11–3 with a 3.20 ERA.

==== 2009 ====
On August 19, 2009, at Dodger Stadium, Wainwright had a no-hitter going against the Los Angeles Dodgers for 5 1/3 innings before Orlando Hudson broke it up with a clean single to left field. In his next start against the Astros, he pitched eight shutout innings to pick up his then-league-leading 15th win in a 1–0 victory. It was Wainwright's 25th straight start with at least six innings pitched. In five August starts that season, he completed 35 2/3 IP with just one walk and 22 SO. On September 26, Wainwright pitched eight innings and struck out eleven for a 6–3, NL Central division-clinching victory against the Colorado Rockies at Coors Field for his 19th win. Wainwright finished with a 19–8 record and a 2.63 ERA, leading the National League in wins, games started (34), and innings pitched (233). He also struck out a major-league high 140 batters on third-strike curveballs.

On October 28, Wainwright won the Players Choice Award as the NL Most Outstanding Pitcher. He won his first Gold Glove Award on November 11. Wainwright was a top contender for the Cy Young Award along with teammate Chris Carpenter and eventual winner Tim Lincecum. He became only the second pitcher ever, after Trevor Hoffman in 1998, to receive the most first-place votes but not win the award. (Note: Wainwright became just the second pitcher in the history of the Cy Young Award to garner the most first-place votes and not win the award. In 1998, San Diego's Trevor Hoffman collected 13 first-place votes and Atlanta's Tom Glavine totaled 11. However, Glavine amassed the most points, 98–88, and thus was the winner.)

==== 2010 ====
Pitching in his first All-Star Game, Wainwright pitched one inning. He faced five batters and allowed no runs with just one hit—a double off the glove of fellow Cardinal Matt Holliday—one walk, and two strikeouts. In one 11-game stretch preceding August 16, he compiled 66 1/3 IP in nine of those starts and allowed two earned runs for a 0.27 ERA.

Wainwright finished the 2010 season 20–11 with a 2.42 ERA, five complete games, 213 strikeouts, 56 walks, 15 home runs allowed, and a WHIP of 1.05, in 230 1/3 IP. His win, strikeout, complete game, and shutout totals were all career-bests. His win total and ERA were both good for second place in the National League (behind only Josh Johnson's 2.30 ERA and Roy Halladay's 21 wins). He also pitched the first two shutouts of his career in 2010—one against the Milwaukee Brewers on June 4 and a two-hitter against the Florida Marlins on August 6.

Wainwright was the runner-up for the Cy Young Award, finishing second in voting behind unanimous winner Halladay. Wainwright picked up 28 of 32 second-place votes. Near the end of the season, he had experienced elbow discomfort and nerve swelling. A magnetic resonance imaging (MRI) scan cleared him after the season.

==== 2011 ====
Shortly after reporting to spring training, Wainwright experienced discomfort in his right elbow while pitching batting practice on February 21. Three days later, the Cardinals announced that Wainwright would miss the entire 2011 season—and possibly the first three months of the next season—after finding that ulnar collateral ligament damage necessitated Tommy John surgery. George Paletta, the team physician, performed the surgery on February 28 in St. Louis and it was deemed "a success". Former clients for the same surgery included teammates Chris Carpenter, Jaime García, and Kyle McClellan. Wainwright's contract featured options for 2012 and 2013 totaling $21 million with a provision that they would not automatically vest if he ended the 2011 season on the disabled list.

The Cardinals made the playoffs as a wild card entry, overtaking the Braves on the final day of the season. They eventually won the World Series, defeating the Texas Rangers four games to three. The Cardinals awarded Wainwright his second World Series ring, despite not pitching the entire season.

==== 2012 ====
Fully recovered after surgery and rehabilitation, Wainwright was ready ahead of schedule for spring training. Statistically, the 2012 season proved to be an overall disappointment by Wainwright's standards, as he wound up 14–13 with a 3.94 ERA. However, it was encouraging in regards to the health of his right arm, as he completed the entire season without any issues. In addition, pitchers recovering from Tommy John surgery often find it challenging at first to throw with the same command as before the surgery, and thus to achieve post-surgery results equal to pre-surgery results. This was the case at first with Wainwright.

On May 22, he threw his first complete-game shutout since August 6, 2010, and the third of his career in his ninth complete game. It was a four-hit, 4–0 win at home against the San Diego Padres, striking out nine and walking only one. Wainwright reached his 1,000th career inning on July 29. The May 22 start marked a turning point in the season. During a 13-start stretch through August 3, he pitched 85 2/3 innings, striking out 83 while allowing just four home runs and 17 BB. Wainwright attributed the improvement to be able to sustain the usual finishing movement on his pitches through late innings, which earlier in the season, had eluded him, thus making his pitches easier to hit. He also corrected a subtle flaw that had developed on the grip of his curveball during a bullpen session prior to the start against San Diego. The flaw made it increasingly difficult to throw the curveball for consistent strikes.

==== 2013 ====
On March 28, 2013, the Cardinals announced they and Wainwright had agreed to a five-year contract extension. At the time, he was under the last year of his previous contract, so the new deal extended him through 2018. With a total value of $97.5 million, it was the largest contract ever for a Cardinals pitcher. On April 18, he became the first pitcher in baseball since 1900 to achieve 28 strikeouts and zero walks in his first four starts of a season. Slim Sallee established the franchise record exactly 100 years earlier by not issuing a walk in his first 40 innings. Wainwright's streak ended in a start at Washington on April 23 after 34 2/3 innings and 133 batters faced.

The first MLB pitcher to post 10 wins on June 13, Wainwright put up seven scoreless innings in a 2–1 defeat of the Mets at Citi Field. Moreover, his strikeout of David Wright was his first of the game and the 1,000th of his career. He allowed six hits and struck out a total of four. Wainwright became the NL Pitcher of the Month for June with a 4–2 record and 1.77 ERA. With 40 strikeouts for the month, Wainwright issued just six walks while holding opposing batters to a .220 average. Through that point in the season, he was 11–5 with a 2.22 ERA, and was the MLB leader with four complete games and a 9.5 strikeout-to-walk ratio.

In successive starts against the Reds in late August, Wainwright allowed 15 runs, both losses. He struck out eight in seven shutout innings on September 7 at home in a 5–0 win over the first-place Pirates in earning his 16th victory of the season. The Pirates, Reds, and Cardinals were all close contenders for the Central division title in September. The win gave the Cardinals first place over the Pirates by a half-game, and 1 1/2 games over the Reds. Wainwright's seven strikeouts increased his career total to 1,103, passing Dizzy Dean (1,095) for second place among Cardinals' pitchers. Only Bob Gibson (3,117 in 528 games) had more.

In a 60-inning stretch following the All-Star break Wainwright had walked 14, compared with 15 in 146 2/3 IP before the break. When fellow starter Shelby Miller defeated Nationals' starter Jordan Zimmermann on September 26, he denied Zimmermann his 20th victory. Two days later, Wainwright, who was second in the league with 18 entering the game, defeated the Chicago Cubs in his final start of the season to tie Zimmerman for the lead in wins at 19. Wainwright also became just the third pitcher in franchise history to twice lead the league in wins, joining Dizzy Dean (1934–35) and Mort Cooper (1942–43). He also led the NL in games started (34), innings pitched (241 2/3), hits allowed (223), and batters faced (956), and was third in strikeouts.

The Cardinals faced the Boston Red Sox in the World Series, and called upon Wainwright to start Game 1 against Jon Lester. It was Wainwright's first World Series appearance since 2006 and first start. He allowed five runs and St. Louis lost, 8–1. In Game 5, a rematch against Lester, the Cardinals again lost, this time 3–1. Wainwright struck out 10 in seven innings, becoming the first Cardinal to reach double digits in strikeouts in a World Series game since Gibson against the Detroit Tigers in 1968. After the Cardinals took a 2–1 Series lead, the Red Sox won the final three games to take the title.

Wainwright won his second Gold Glove award in 2013. In the Cy Young balloting, Wainwright placed second, his second such ranking, and finished 23rd in the NL MVP voting.

==== 2014 ====
Starting for the Cardinals against the Reds on Opening Day, March 31, 2014, Wainwright won his 100th career decision. In seven innings, he struck out nine and gave up just three singles in a 1–0 win. At Nationals Park against Washington on April 17, he pitched a two-hit shutout, winning 8–0. Wainwright gave up the first hit in the second inning on a high infield chopper, but none after until two outs into the ninth. He walked three and struck out eight. It was his seventh career shutout. In an April 27 start against the Pirates, Wainwright tallied eight scoreless innings to extend a streak to 25 innings as the Cardinals won, 7–0, but was pulled before he could get a complete game due to concerns over his April 22 hyperextended right knee injury. His streak of 25 scoreless innings ended in the first inning on May 2 in a loss against the Cubs, to whom he allowed six runs.

On May 20, Wainwright pitched a one-hitter against the Diamondbacks. He retired the first 11 batters before giving up a double to Paul Goldschmidt in the fourth inning. After the hit, Wainwright retired the final 16 batters, facing only 28, one over the minimum for a perfect game. He walked none and struck out nine, throwing 115 pitches, 86 for strikes. It was Wainwright's seventh win of the year, tying for the National League lead, and his 106th career victory against 59 losses. It also tied him for eighth place with Sallee on the all-time Cardinals' pitching win list and was his eighth career shutout. Wainwright followed that effort with eight more scoreless innings on May 25. Between those two starts, he gave up just one walk and struck out a major-league-leading 21 batters in 17 scoreless innings. He was named NL Co-Player of the Week with Dodgers starter Josh Beckett, who threw a no-hitter on May 25. However, he missed his June 16 against the Mets due to elbow tendinitis, but an MRI showed no structural damage to the Tommy John surgically repaired ligament.

After leading the NL with a 1.79 ERA and 11 wins through July 6, Wainwright was selected to his third All-Star Game at Target Field in Minneapolis, Minnesota. He was selected as the NL's starting pitcher for the first time in his career. Besides two starts in which he gave up seven runs to the Giants and six to the Cubs, Wainwright had allowed 13 runs in 16 of his first 18 starts. Nine of those starts included totals with seven or more innings pitched and zero earned runs allowed. Per the Elias Sports Bureau (ESB), it was the first time in Major League history that any pitcher achieved that feat in his first 18 starts of the season.

When the Cardinals defeated the Brewers 10–2 on July 12, Wainwright finished his pre-All Star break total with a 12–4 record and a 1.83 ERA. Further, he joined Hall of Fame member Steve Carlton as the only Cardinals to post an ERA less than 2.00 and at least 12 wins before the All-Star break (1969). In that game, Wainwright posted his Major League-leading 15th start of the season with at least seven innings pitched and two or fewer runs allowed. At the plate, his RBI-single scored rookie Oscar Taveras for his 100th career hit.

In the All-Star Game, Wainwright incurred controversy over his remarks about facing leadoff hitter Derek Jeter. Jeter, who was retiring after the season, doubled on Wainwright's second pitch of the game. During interviews, he admitted that he gave Jeter an easy pitch to hit. "I was gonna give him a couple of pipe shots. He deserved it," Wainwright said. "I didn’t know he was gonna hit a double or I might have changed my mind." Wainwright later recanted, stating that it was in humor and that he was "not intentionally giving up hits out there".

Conversely, Jeter was appreciative. "He grooved them? The first one was a little cutter that he threw down and away. He probably assumed I was swinging. So he didn't groove the first one. The second was about 90, a two-seamer that stayed on a really good ... No, I don't know, man," he paused and smiled, drawing laughs from reporters. "I have no idea. If he grooved it, thank you. You still got to hit it."

Following the All-Star break, Wainwright temporarily struggled to keep the consistency of the first half of the season due to frequent elbow irritation. In June, he gave up just four earned runs in 31 IP for a 1.16 ERA, and followed that up with a 1.62 ERA in July. His results reversed in August when he allowed 22 ER in 38 1/3 IP for a 5.17 ERA. However, in September, he posted a 1.38 ERA in 39 IP with 29 SO and a 5–0 W–L. He was subsequently named the NL Pitcher of the Month for September.

After the season, Wainwright had a procedure to remove part of the cartilage of the right elbow on October 24. At times—commencing in June—he had altered his mechanics to mitigate the discomfort. In his third-to-last and second-to-last starts of the season—which were in the NLDS against the Dodgers and NLCS against the Giants—Wainwright was unable to complete five innings in both starts. This led to speculation Wainwright was pitching with pain, which he denied.

Through the 2014 season he had a career 132 ERA+, third-highest for an active pitcher who has a minimum of 1,000 innings, and a .643 winning percentage, fourth-highest for active pitchers. Wainwright finished third in the Cy Young voting for 2014, his third such placing, and fourth time he was positioned in the top three.

==== 2015 ====
The Cardinals selected Wainwright to make his fourth career Opening Day start, and the season-opening game for MLB in 2015, in what was also the first-ever MLB Opening Night game. He was credited with the win as the Cardinals defeated the Cubs at Wrigley Field, 3–0. On April 25, Wainwright left the game against the Brewers in the top of the fifth after suffering an ankle injury while batting. The next day, the Cardinals placed him on the 15-day disabled list, and announced the following day that he had an Achilles tendon rupture and would likely miss the remainder of the season. He underwent successful surgery to repair the tendon on April 30.

With a recovery initially expected to take nine to twelve months, Wainwright had made four appearances through that point in the season, going 2–1 with a 1.44 ERA. As the season progressed, he consistently stated his goal was to return to pitching before the end of the season. After working diligently to accelerate his recovery, the Cardinals announced on September 21 that he was cleared to resume baseball activities, two weeks prior to the conclusion of the regular season. His actual recovery took five months.

Making his first appearance of the season since April, Wainwright pitched a scoreless inning of relief in the first game of a doubleheader against Pittsburgh on September 30, an 8–2 loss. It was his first relief appearance since the 2006 World Series. Wainwright was named the Hutch Award winner for 2015.

==== 2016 ====
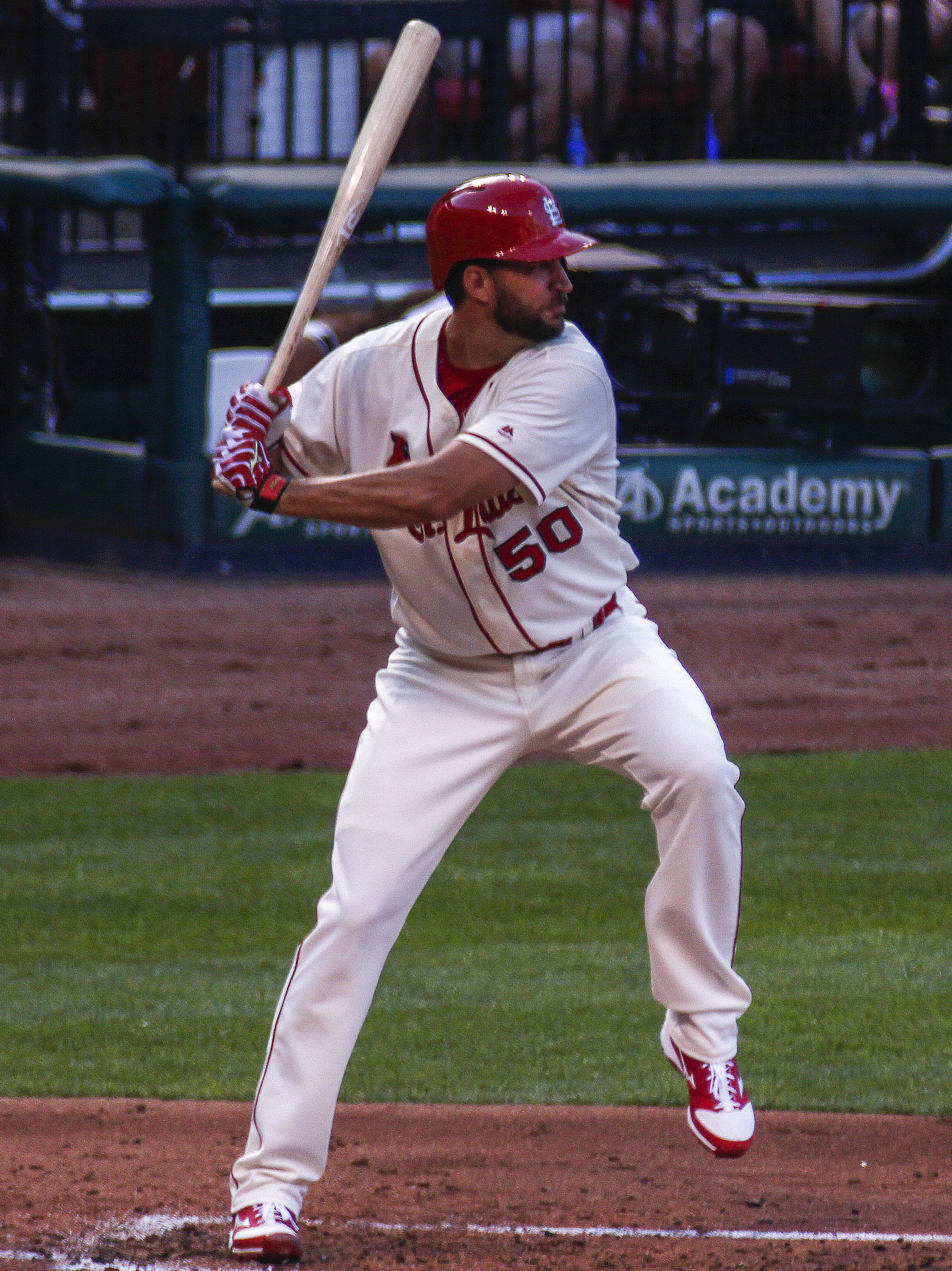
Wainwright, seen here batting in 2017, won a Silver Slugger Award in 2016.

The Cardinals announced before spring training that Wainwright would be the Opening Day starter in 2016, his fifth time. For the three previous seasons, he had gone 41–19 with a 2.61 ERA. For the second consecutive season, the Cardinals opened the MLB season, this time at PNC Park against the Pittsburgh Pirates on April 3. The Cardinals lost the game, 4–1, with Wainwright taking the first loss of the season. He hit his first home run of season in a 10–3 win over the Philadelphia Phillies on May 2, also being credited with his second win. In each of four consecutive plate appearances spanning April 27 to May 7, he became the first Cardinal pitcher since 1900 to garner an extra base hit while batting, per Elias Sports Bureau. On the mound, he struggled early, yielding a 5.04 ERA in his first 16 starts of the season.

Wainwright pitched a three-hit, complete-game shutout and 5−0 win against Miami on July 15, 2016; the first hit he allowed was a double to Adeiny Hechavarria in the sixth inning. With four RBI against Colorado on September 20, Wainwright increased his season total to 18, the highest total for all pitchers in the designated hitter era – since 1973 – and the most since Ferguson Jenkins drove in 20 for the Cubs in 1971.

==== 2017 ====
On April 21, 2017, Wainwright struck out nine and hit a home run with four RBI as the Cardinals defeated the Milwaukee Brewers, 6−3. His May 27 appearance was the 330th of his career, tying him with Larry Jackson (1955−1962) for tenth place in games pitched for the Cardinals. while passing Al Hrabosky. Wainwright pitched six scoreless innings versus Los Angeles on June 1, while hitting a two-run home run facing Brandon McCarthy, for a 2−0 win.

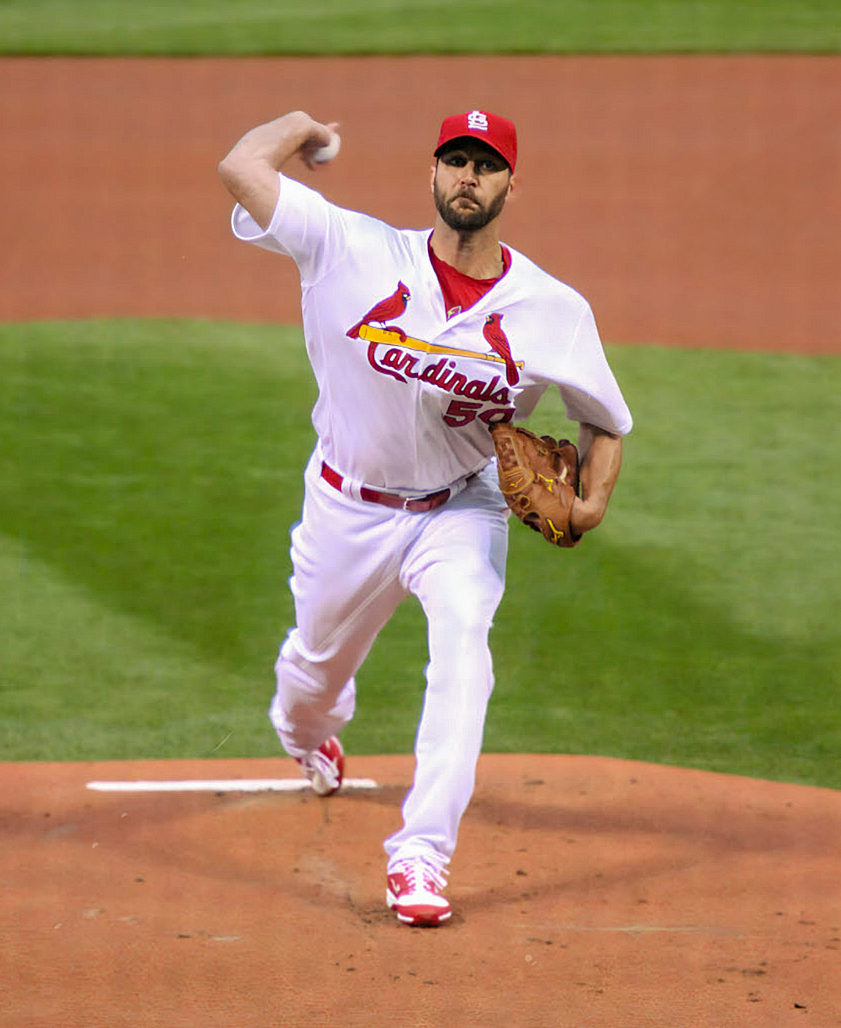
Adam Wainwright on the mound in St. Louis.

On July 17, he passed Bill Doak for fifth place in wins (145) for the Cardinals. On the same day, Wainwright became the only active major league pitcher with multiple seasons of 10+ RBI (2016–17).

The Cardinals placed Wainwright on the 10-day DL on July 25 due to mid-back tightness, retroactive to July 23. It was the fourth time in his career that he had been placed on the DL. Wainwright was activated from the DL on August 6, and totaled 11 innings in three starts. On August 18, the Cardinals placed him back on the DL for right elbow impingement. Wainwright reported pain in his right elbow for the second consecutive season and displayed a precipitous decline in velocity in his most recent starts. Treatments on the right elbow that Wainwright received during the season included trimming cartilage and an injection of platelet-rich plasma into the joint. In 23 games he had started, he allowed a 5.12 ERA with a 12−5 W−L record. Wainwright returned to pitch on September 18 from the bullpen for the remainder of the season.

In 2017, Wainwright won his first career Silver Slugger Award, the first Cardinal pitcher to win the award since Bob Forsch (1980 and 1987) and Jason Marquis (2005). He batted .262/.279/.452, a career-high .731 OPS, and two home runs. Wainwright led all pitchers with seven runs scored and 11 RBI, and, among all with at least 40 plate appearances, in slugging percentage and OPS. He also hit .462 with runners in scoring position.

After the season, Wainwright underwent right elbow surgery to remove a cartilage flap, the first surgery on the elbow since having Tommy John surgery in 2011. The cartilage flap was believed to have caused a bone bruise which led to reduced velocity and efficacy of his breaking pitches. Recovery time was expected to take six weeks with full readiness in time for the 2018 season.

==== 2018 ====
Wainwright began the 2018 season on the 10-day disabled list with a left hamstring sprain. He was reactivated on April 5 but placed on the disabled list again with right elbow inflammation on April 22. Wainwright was activated once again on May 13 and started that same day against the San Diego Padres. He gave up two runs and walked six batters in 2 1/3 innings as San Diego beat St. Louis 5–3. Two days later, Wainwright was placed back on the 10-day DL before being transferred to the 60-day DL on May 17.

==== 2019 ====
Wainwright signed a one-year, $2 million contract extension with the Cardinals prior to the 2019 offseason. On April 24, 2019, Wainwright picked up his 150th win in a 5–2 victory against the Brewers. Over 31 starts during the regular season, he went 14–10 with a 4.19 ERA, striking out 153 over 171 2/3 innings. In the 2019 MLB postseason, Wainwright struck out 19 over 16 2/3 innings and had a 1.62 ERA.

==== 2020 ====
On November 12, 2019, Wainwright and the Cardinals agreed to a one-year contract for the 2020 season. On his 39th birthday, Wainwright pitched his first complete game since 2016 against the Cleveland Indians in a 7–2 win. He pitched a second, albeit 7-inning complete game against the Milwaukee Brewers on September 16. Over 10 starts for the 2020 season, Wainwright went 5–3 with a 3.15 ERA and 54 strikeouts over 65 2/3 innings.

==== 2021 ====
On January 28, 2021, Wainwright signed a one-year, $8 million contract to stay with the Cardinals. On April 26, Wainwright pitched a complete game against the Philadelphia Phillies in a 2–1 loss as Rhys Hoskins hit two solo home runs off him. It was the second such occurrence in his career to pitch a 9-inning complete game and lose since a 2–1 loss to the Los Angeles Dodgers in 2007.

Wainwright picked up his first win of the season in a 6–5 win over the New York Mets on May 3, while also picking up his 1,000th career strikeout at Busch Stadium; joining Bob Gibson as the only Cardinals pitchers with 1,000 strikeouts at their home ballparks. On June 14, Wainwright picked up his 1,900th strikeout against the Miami Marlins. On Father's Day, June 20, he pitched his second complete game of the year, albeit 7 innings in the first game of a doubleheader against the Atlanta Braves; striking out 11 while allowing just one run. On August 10, Wainwright pitched his first shutout since 2016, and his first ever Maddux against the Pittsburgh Pirates at PNC Park in a 4–0 Cardinals win, throwing 88 pitches. At 39, he became the oldest pitcher to record a shutout since Bartolo Colón in 2015. He was subsequently named National League Pitcher of the Month for August after going 5–1 with a 1.45 ERA, striking out 36 while walking just six over 44 innings. On September 3, Wainwright started against the Brewers with battery mate Yadier Molina, marking their 300th start as a battery. They are the fourth battery in MLB history to make 300 starts. The Cardinals won the game 15–4, with Wainwright picking up the win. While facing the Milwaukee Brewers on September 23, Wainwright recorded his 2,000th career strikeout against Luis Urías. Wainwright became the second pitcher in franchise history alongside Bob Gibson to reach the milestone.

On October 1, the Cardinals and Wainwright agreed on a one-year deal for the 2022 season.

Statistically for 2021, Wainwright had his best season since 2014, going 17–7 with a 3.05 ERA and 174 strikeouts in 206 1/3 innings. Wainwright was second in MLB in wins (17), third in innings pitched (206 1/3), tied for first in complete games (3) and tenth in walks and hits per inning pitched (1.057). He led the major leagues in sacrifice hits, with 14.

Wainwright finished seventh in the 2021 NL Cy Young Award voting.

==== 2022 ====
On October 4, 2021, Wainwright and the Cardinals agreed to a one-year, $17.5 million deal for the 2022 season

On April 7, 2022, Wainwright won his 100th game at Busch Stadium on Opening Day in a 9–0 win against the Pittsburgh Pirates, pitching six shutout innings with six strikeouts. On May 15, 2022, Wainwright and Molina made history claiming their 203rd win together, becoming the most successful battery in MLB history. Later that season on September 14, Wainwright and Molina set another MLB record by starting alongside one another for the 325th time, surpassing Mickey Lolich and Bill Freehan of the Detroit Tigers for the most starts by a battery.

In November 2022, it was announced that Wainwright intended to represent Team USA in the 2023 World Baseball Classic.

==== 2023 ====
Wainwright announced that the 2023 season would be his last. On March 30, Wainwright sang the national anthem before the opening day game. In 21 starts for the Cardinals, Wainwright struggled to a 5–11 record and 7.40 ERA with 55 strikeouts in 101.0 innings of work.

On September 18, pitching at home against the division-leading Milwaukee Brewers, he won his 200th game, 1–0, pitching seven scoreless innings, giving up only four hits, walking two, striking out three. His 2,202 career strikeouts make him the 66th pitcher to have at least 2,200 strikeouts. His 200 wins make him the 122nd pitcher in baseball history to reach that milestone. His 200 wins, all with the Cardinals, rank him third in the team's history, joining Bob Gibson (251) and Jesse Haines (210).

At home on September 29, he batted for the first time since October 6, 2021. In the sixth inning with the team trailing 14–2, he pinch-hit for designated hitter Luken Baker. On the second pitch, he grounded out sharply to second base. It was his only at-bat that night.

Over his career, he had 10 home runs, 75 RBIs, and a .192 batting average. He has five seasons batting over .200. Defensively, he recorded a .982 fielding percentage, with only 10 errors in 569 total chances, which was 26 points higher than the league average at his position.

=== Annual statistical achievements ===
Notes: Through 2019 season. Per Baseball-Reference.com.

National League statistical leader
| Category | Times | Dates |
|---|---|---|
| Complete games leader | 2 | 2013, 2021 |
| Home runs per nine innings allowed leader | 1 | 2014 |
| Innings pitched leader | 2 | 2009, 2013 |
| Shutouts leader | 2 | 2013, 2014 |
| Wins champion | 2 | 2009, 2013 |

== Pitching style ==
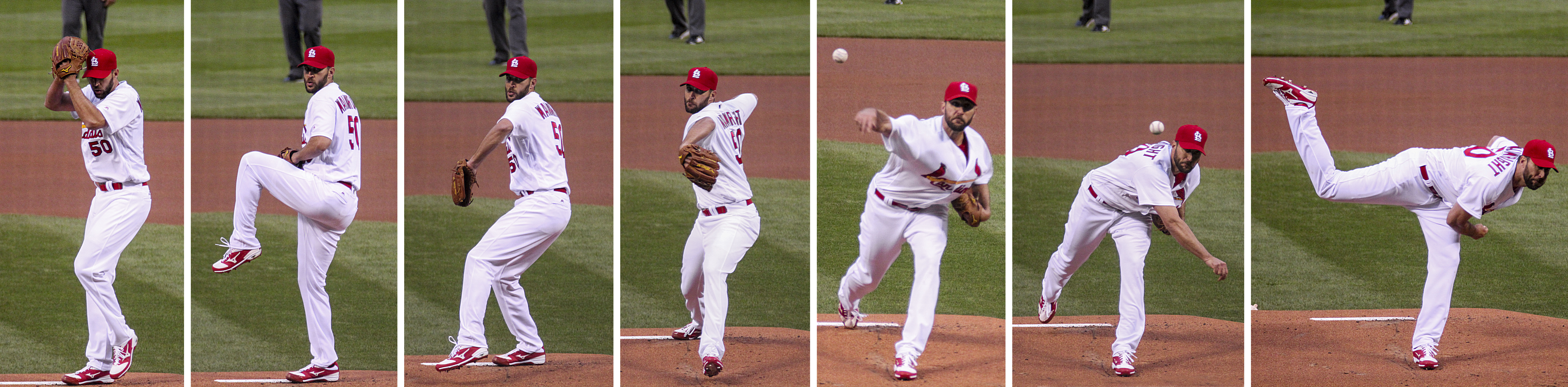
Wainwright's pitching motion, 2016

Wainwright has a sinkerball, throwing it in the 90–92 miles per hour (145–148 km/h) range. He also throws a good deal of cutters 84–88 miles per hour (135–142 km/h) and curveballs 73–77 miles per hour (117–124 km/h) that have dropped more than 8 inches before from top to bottom of the pitch. Less commonly, he also throws a four-seam fastball 90–95 miles per hour (145–153 km/h) and an 84–86 miles per hour (135–138 km/h) changeup. He uses all of his pitches against left-handed hitters, but he does not use the changeup against right-handers. Wainwright's most-used pitch in two-strike counts is his curveball.

In spring training of 2013, he started incorporating an elevated four-seam fastball, making his curveball more effective.

== Discography ==
=== Studio albums ===
| Title | Details | Peak chart positions | | Sales | Certifications |
| Title | Details | US | CAN | Sales | Certifications |
|---|---|---|---|---|---|
| Hey Y'all | Release date: April 5, 2024; Label: in:ciite; Formats: CD, vinyl, download | - | - | | |

=== Singles ===
List of singles as lead artist, with selected chart positions
| Title | Year | Peak chart positions | | Certifications | Album |
| Title | Year | US | CAN | Certifications | Album |
|---|---|---|---|---|---|
| "Time to Fly" | 2023 | — | — | | |
| "Hey Y'all" | 2024 | — | — | | Hey Y'all |
| "A Song Will Bring You Back" | 2024 | — | — | | Hey Y'all |

"—" denotes a release that did not chart.

== Outside baseball ==
=== Big League Impact ===
A fantasy football enthusiast, Wainwright created and hosts a fantasy football network in eight cities called Big League Impact, designed to raise money for various charities. In 2015, the organization raised more than $1 million total. Other major leaguers, including David Wright, Hunter Pence, and John Smoltz host in their respective cities.

The concept officially opened in July 2013 with the launch of a website called WainosWorld.com. In an interview with Fox Sports Midwest, Wainwright remarked that the program combined his love of fantasy football with his passion for helping the less fortunate. For a registration fee, all of which goes to charity, fans can assemble their own fantasy team and compete throughout the season against not only Wainwright but his current and former Cardinals teammates Allen Craig, David Freese, and Matt Holliday. Those with the best team records at season's end will receive prizes. The league raised $100,000 in 2013 and supported Operation Food Search and Water Missions International.

Wainwright was the recipient of the 2020 Roberto Clemente Award due to his work with Big League Impact alongside his contributions in helping build Haiti's Ferrier Village Secondary School.

=== As an actor ===
With longtime aspirations to host an episode of Saturday Night Live, Wainwright made his film debut in the 2016 comedy-drama Proximity, directed by Dan Steadman and filmed in the St. Louis area. The majority of the work done was completed in 2015, after the opportunity presented to Wainwright due in part to the Achilles tendon injury he had suffered early in the season.

=== Broadcasting ===
Adam Wainwright made his national TV broadcasting debut on October 6, 2020, calling the 2020 NLDS between the Miami Marlins and Atlanta Braves on Fox Sports 1 along with Adam Amin and former teammate A. J. Pierzynski. The trio worked together for the 2021 ALDS between the Astros and the Chicago White Sox and again in the 2023 ALDS between the Houston Astros and Minnesota Twins. Prior to the 2024 MLB season, Wainwright was hired as a full-time color commentator for Fox Sports.

=== Musician ===
On March 30, 2023, Wainwright surprised his teammates by performing the national anthem prior to the Cardinals' home opener against the Toronto Blue Jays. After he accomplished his musical goal, he nervously admitted, "I didn't mess the words up." Wainwright aspires to be a country music singer after his baseball career concludes; he held a concert in Springfield, Illinois, in January 2023 for approximately 500 fans.

Wainwright has released three singles and one full-length album, Hey Y'all. It which was originally scheduled to be released on March 9, 2024, when he made his Grand Ole Opry debut, but was officially released on April 5, 2024.

=== Politics ===
In May 2025, Public Policy Polling, a polling firm affiliated with the Democratic Party, ran a poll in Missouri's 2nd congressional district gauging voters' interest in Wainwright relative to incumbent Republican Representative Ann Wagner, suggesting he was being recruited to run in the 2026 United States House of Representatives elections.

== Personal life ==
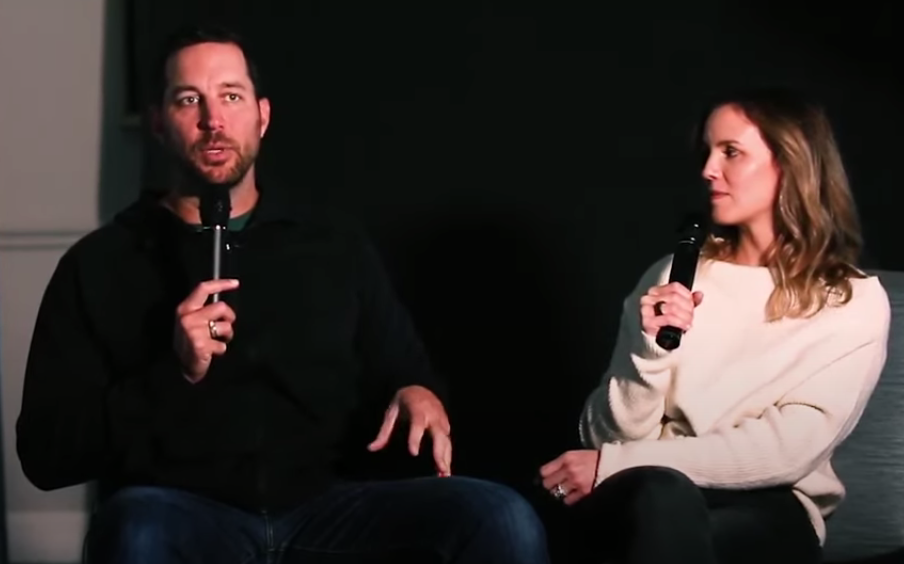
Wainwright and his wife, Jenny, in 2022

Wainwright married his high school sweetheart, Jenny Curry, in 2004. In a quirk of fate, he was in the midst of proposing to Curry in December 2003, when a telephone call interrupted him to inform him he'd been traded from the Braves to the Cardinals. Jenny holds a degree in interior design from Georgia Southern University. In the off-season, the Wainwrights reside on St. Simons Island, Georgia, with their four daughters and a son, whom they adopted in 2019. Wainwright has openly expressed his Christian faith, and is active in the Fellowship of Christian Athletes.

== See also ==
- List of Major League Baseball career wins leaders
- List of Major League Baseball annual shutout leaders
- List of Major League Baseball career putouts as a pitcher leaders
- List of Major League Baseball career strikeout leaders
- List of Major League Baseball players who spent their entire career with one franchise
- List of Major League Baseball players with a home run in their first major league at bat
- List of St. Louis Cardinals team records
- List of World Series starting pitchers
- St. Louis Cardinals award winners and league leaders

Awards and achievements
| Preceded by Patrick Corbin; Madison Bumgarner; Walker Buehler | National League Pitcher of the Month; June 2013; September 2014; August 2021 | Succeeded by Clayton Kershaw; Gerrit Cole; Max Fried |
