= Marcus Semien =

American baseball player (born 1990)

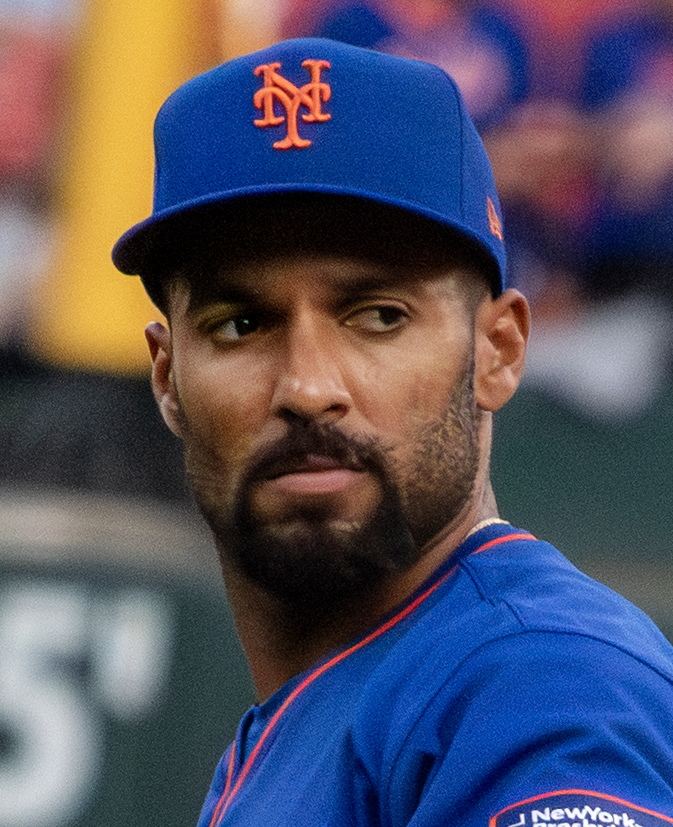
- Semien with the New York Mets in 2026

New York Mets – No. 10
- Second baseman / Shortstop
- Born: September 17, 1990 (age 36); San Francisco, California, U.S.
- Bats: Right Throws: Right

MLB debut
- September 4, 2013, for the Chicago White Sox

MLB statistics (through 2026 season)
- Batting average: .251
- Hits: 1,719
- Home runs: 268
- Runs batted in: 850
- Stolen bases: 149
- Stats at Baseball Reference

Teams
- Chicago White Sox (2013–2014); Oakland Athletics (2015–2020); Toronto Blue Jays (2021); Texas Rangers (2022–2025); New York Mets (2026–present)

Career highlights and awards
- 3× All-Star (2021, 2023, 2024); World Series champion (2023); 2× All-MLB First Team (2021, 2023); 2× Gold Glove Award (2021, 2025); 2× Silver Slugger Award (2021, 2023); MLB records: Most home runs by a player primarily playing second base, single season (45 in 2021)

Marcus Andrew Semien (born September 17, 1990) is an American professional baseball second baseman and shortstop for the New York Mets of Major League Baseball (MLB). He has previously played in MLB for the Chicago White Sox, Oakland Athletics, Toronto Blue Jays, and Texas Rangers.

Semien was a All-Star in 2021 with the Blue Jays, when he also won the Gold Glove Award and Silver Slugger Award. Semien signed a seven-year, $175 million contract with the Rangers following the 2021 season and won the World Series with the team in 2023.

== Early life ==
Marcus Andrew Semien was born on September 17, 1990 in San Francisco. He grew up pitching and playing infield in El Cerrito Youth Baseball, across the bay from San Francisco, and was a member of the area's All-Star teams. He attended St. Mary's College High School in Berkeley, California. At St. Mary's, he hit .471 as a junior, .371 as a senior, and was named all-league three times, where he was drafted by the Chicago White Sox in the 34th round of the 2008 MLB draft.

== College career ==
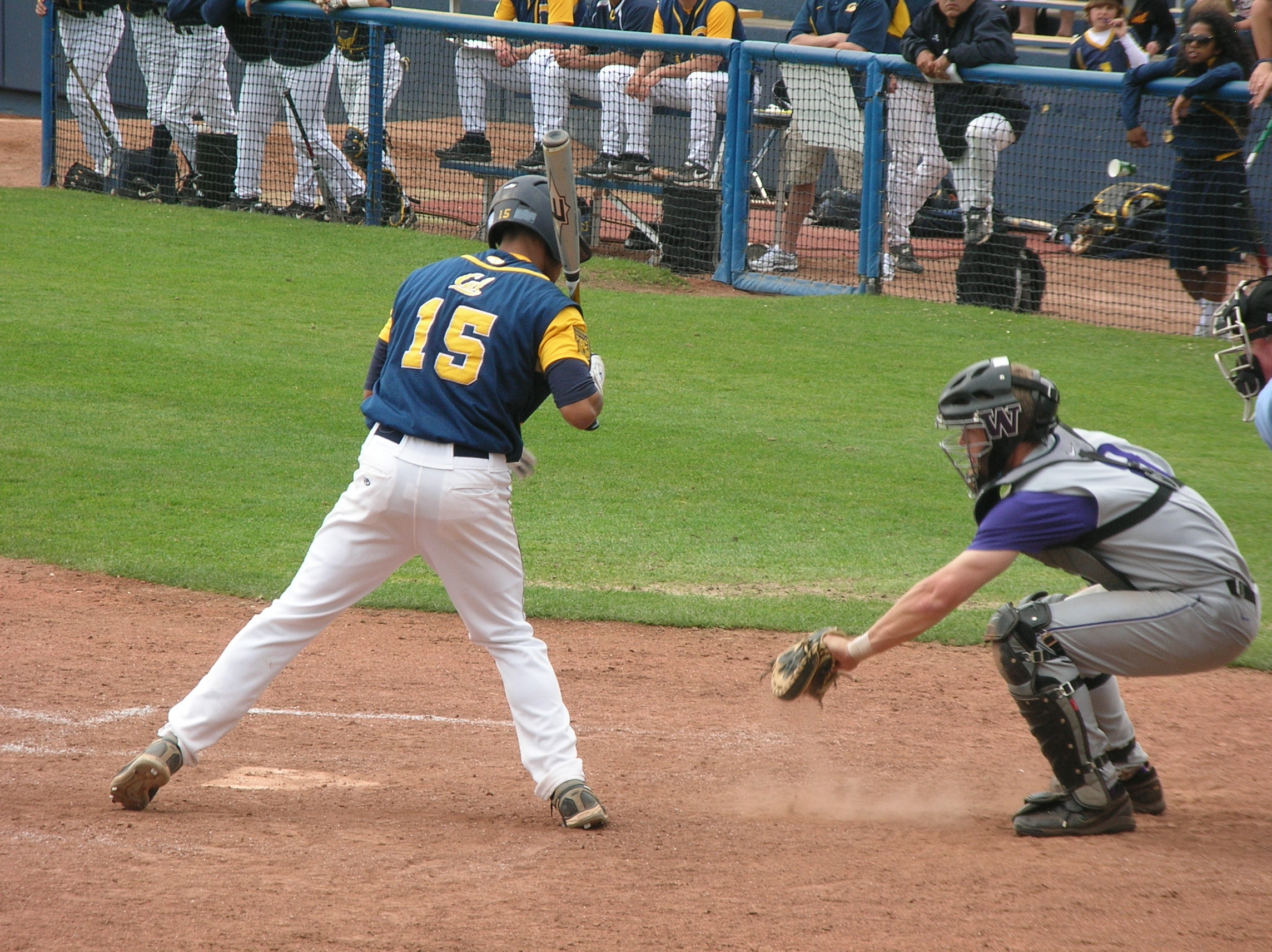
Semien (left) batting for Cal in 2010

Semien chose not to sign and instead enrolled at the University of California, Berkeley, where he played college baseball for the California Golden Bears. After struggling as a freshman, Semien improved as a sophomore, hitting .328. As a junior, Semien was the starting shortstop for the team, but hit .275, hurting his stock for the MLB Draft.

During summers between college seasons (2009 and 2010), Semien played summer collegiate wood-bat baseball with the Alexandria Beetles of the Northwoods League.

== Professional career ==
=== Chicago White Sox (2011–2014) ===
==== Minor leagues ====
The White Sox drafted Semien in the sixth round, with the 201st overall selection of the 2011 Major League Baseball draft. He started his professional career that year with the Single–A Kannapolis Intimidators, finishing the season hitting .253 in 229 at-bats with, 15 doubles, two triples, three home runs, 26 runs batted in (RBIs) and three stolen bases. Semien was moved up to High–A Winston-Salem Dash for the 2012 season. There, he hit .273 in 418 at-bats with 31 doubles, five triples, 14 home runs, 59 RBIs, and 11 stolen bases. For the 2013 season, Semien was ranked the White Sox's #8 prospect.

==== Major leagues ====
On September 3, 2013, the White Sox selected Semien's contract from the Triple-A Charlotte Knights and promoted him to the major leagues for the first time. He debuted against the New York Yankees the next day and recorded his first hit, a single, against CC Sabathia in his first at-bat. He hit his first major league home run against J. A. Happ of the Toronto Blue Jays on September 23. He finished his debut campaign appearing in 21 games and hitting .261 with 2 home runs and 7 RBI.

In 2014, Semien played in 64 games for the White Sox, hitting .234/.300/.372 with 6 home runs and 28 RBI.

=== Oakland Athletics (2015–2020) ===
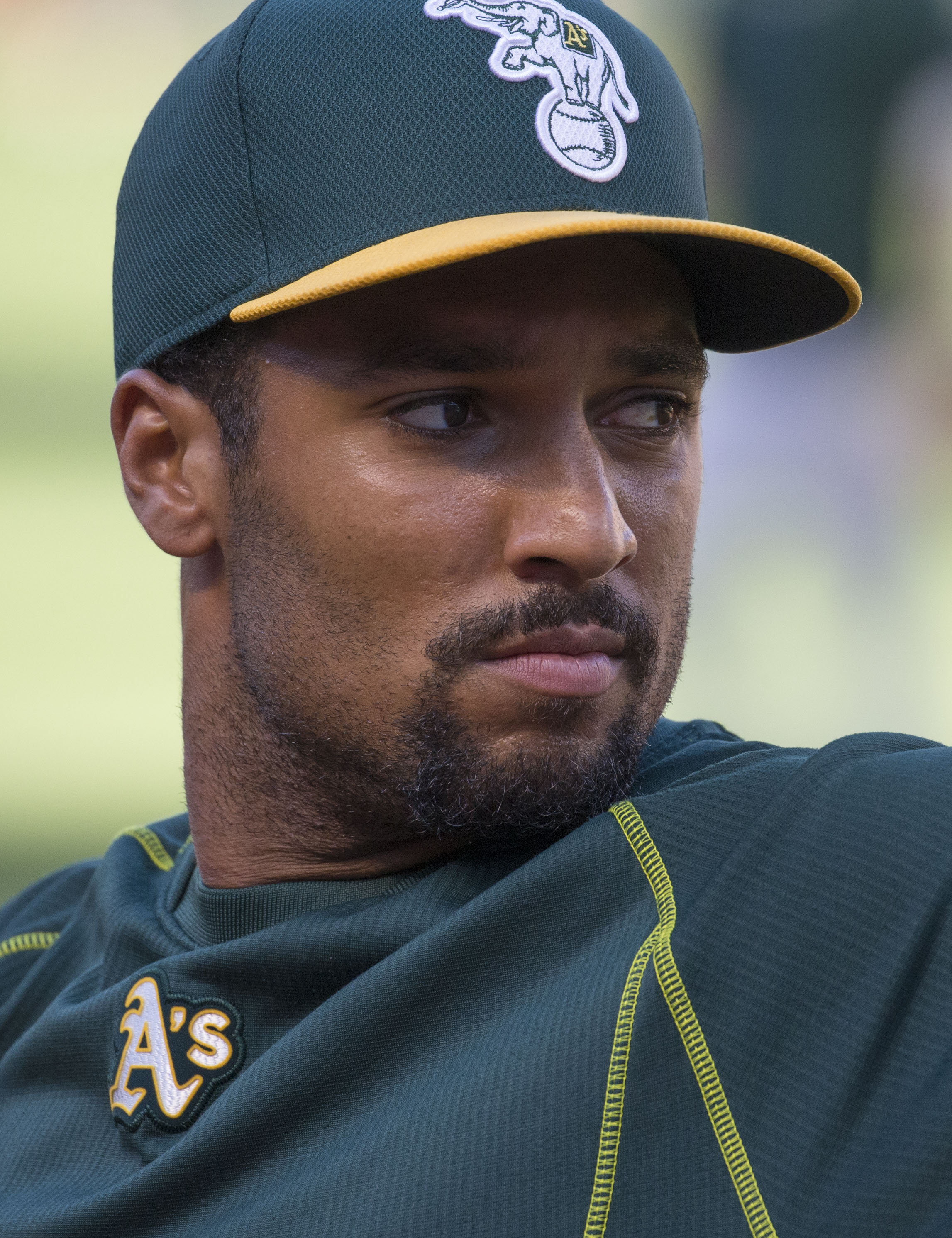

On December 9, 2014, the White Sox traded Semien, Chris Bassitt, Rangel Ravelo, and Josh Phegley to the Oakland Athletics in exchange for Jeff Samardzija and Michael Ynoa. He began the 2015 season as the team's starting shortstop. Semien struggled defensively throughout the season, committing a major-league-worst 35 errors, including a major-league-leading 18 throwing errors. He finished the 2015 season with a .257 AVG and fifteen home runs and eleven stolen bases. After the season, the Athletics hired Ron Washington to work with Semien on his defense.

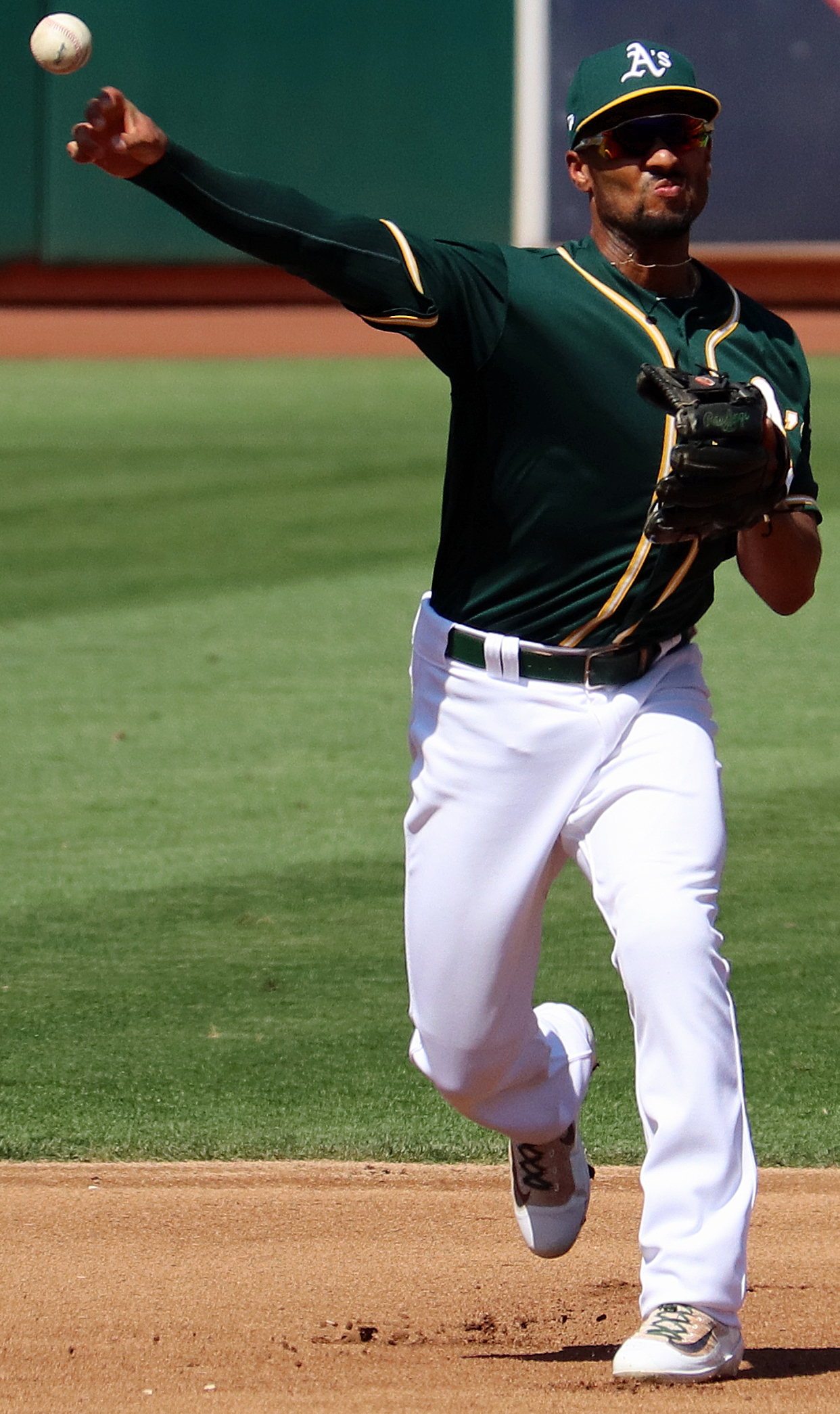
Semien in 2017

In 2016, Semien committed only 21 errors. He led the major leagues in assists, with 477. He showed power at the plate, finishing second on the team in home runs with 27, as he batted .238 with ten stolen bases.

On April 17, 2017, Semien was placed on the 10-day disabled list due to a right wrist fracture, which also required surgery. For the 2017 season, he batted .249 with ten home runs and twelve stolen bases.

In 2018, he batted .255 with fifteen home runs and fourteen stolen bases. On defense he led the major leagues in assists, with 459. He was one of three finalists for a Gold Glove at shortstop in the American League, marking drastic defensive improvement from his previous seasons.

In 2019, he batted .285/.369/.522 with 33 home runs and led the major leagues with 747 plate appearances. His performance improvements garnered him even more attention from postseason awards voters as he was named to the inaugural All-MLB second team at shortstop, finished third in voting for the American League MVP, and was again named one of three finalists for the Gold Glove.

In 53 games for the Athletics in the COVID-19 pandemic–shortened 2020 season, Semien slashed .223/.305/.374 with seven home runs, nine doubles and 23 RBIs.

=== Toronto Blue Jays (2021) ===
On January 30, 2021, Semien signed a one-year, $18 million contract with the Toronto Blue Jays. On July 1, he was named an All-Star for the first time in his career, as the starting second baseman for the AL in the 2021 All-Star Game. On September 29, Semien hit his 44th home run of the 2021 season, breaking Davey Johnson's MLB record for the most home runs in a season by a primary second baseman.

Semien finished the 2021 season hitting .265/.334/.538 with 45 home runs, 102 RBIs, and an MLB-leading 86 extra-base hits. He finished third in American League MVP voting, behind only Shohei Ohtani and teammate Vladimir Guerrero Jr.

=== Texas Rangers (2022–2025) ===
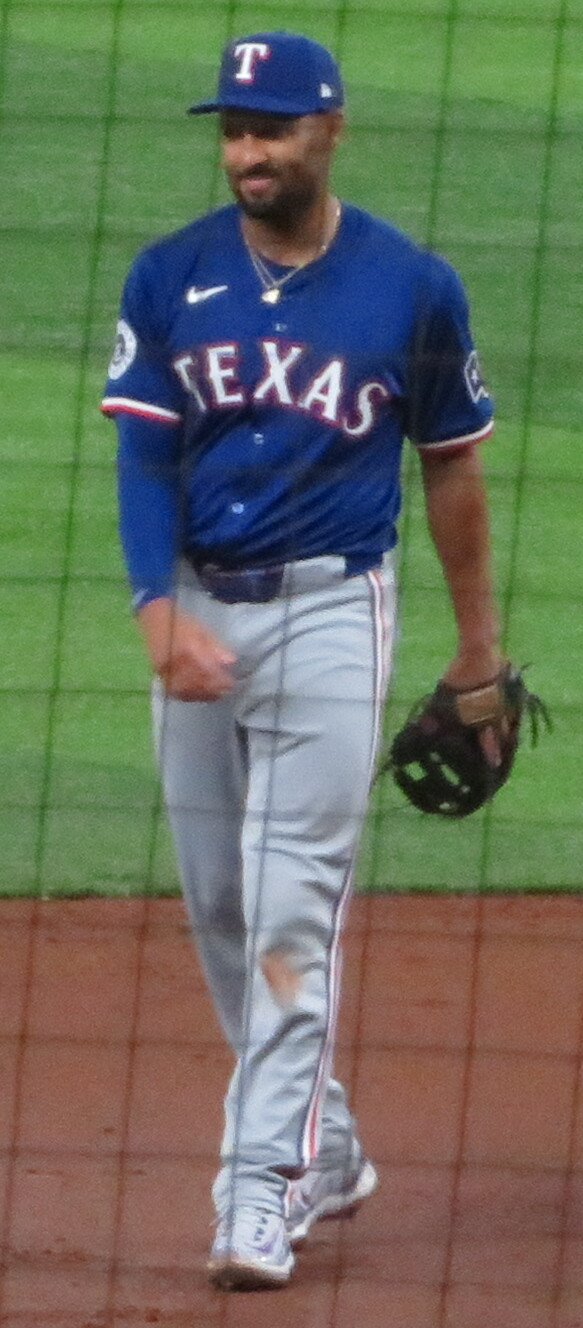
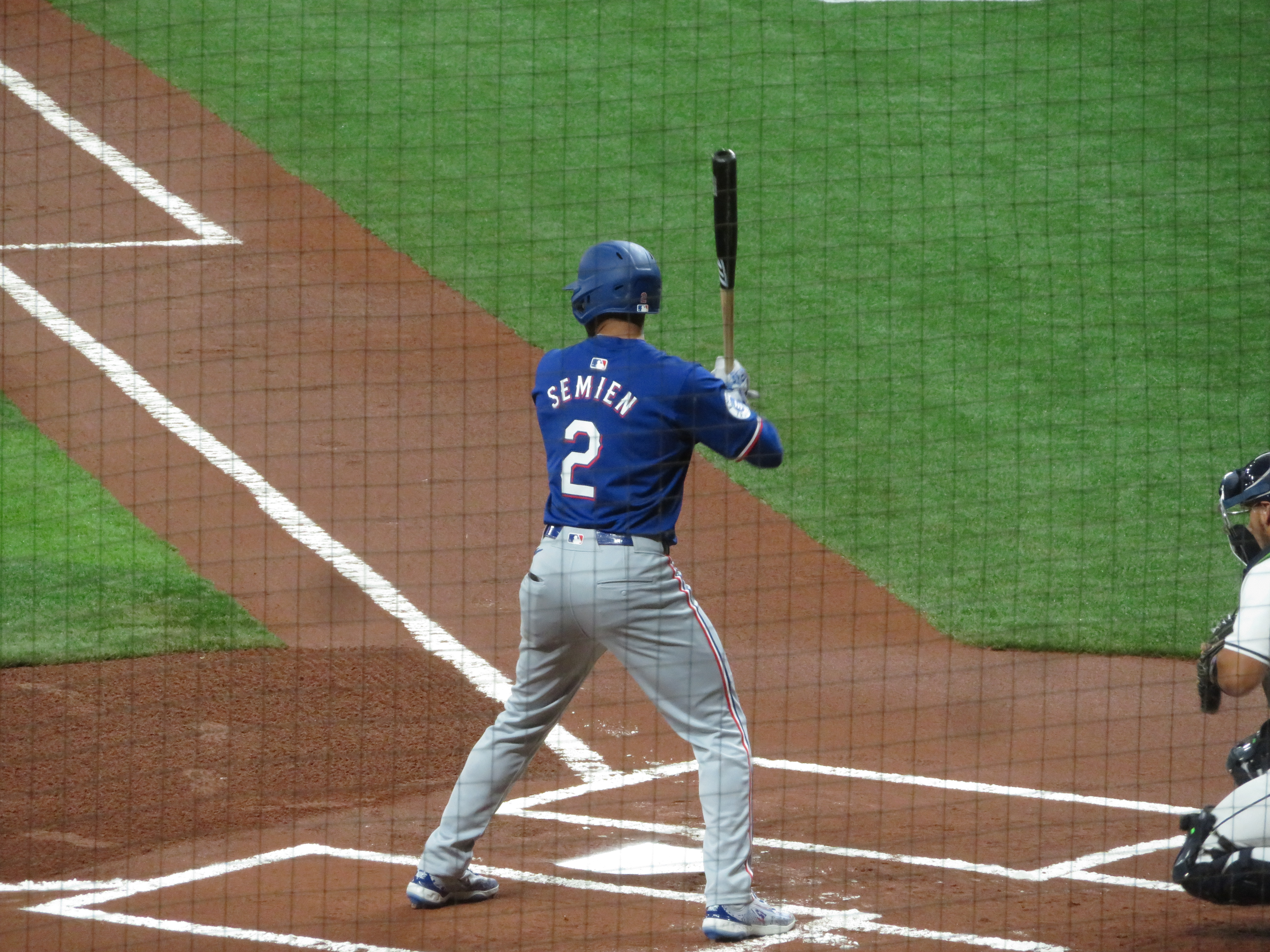
Semien with the Texas Rangers in 2024.

On December 1, 2021, Semien agreed to a seven-year, $175 million contract with the Texas Rangers. In 2022, he led the major leagues in plate appearances (724) for the second straight year and at-bats (657) and sacrifice flies (10; tied with Alex Bregman and Alec Bohm), and hit .248/.304/.429 with 26 home runs and 83 RBI. He reached on an error 12 times, tops in the majors.

In 2023, Semien again led the league in plate appearances (753) after playing in all 162 games, while batting .276/.348/.478 with a league-leading 122 runs. In addition, he set the single–season (regular and postseason) in MLB history record for plate appearances, attaining 835 total plate appearances, which passed Lenny Dykstra's previous record of 833. Semien became the fifth player in MLB history with at least 100 RBI in the leadoff spot, and won a Silver Slugger award. He finished third in AL MVP Voting, behind Shohei Ohtani and his teammate Corey Seager.

With the Rangers, Semien won the 2023 World Series as the team defeated the Arizona Diamondbacks in five games. In 2024 playing in all but three games, he batted .237/.308/.391 with 23 home runs and 74 RBI. In addition, he hit a single (his 1,500th career hit) playing against the Oakland A's in the last series of games played at Oakland Coliseum.

Semien made 127 appearances for the Rangers during the 2025 season, slashing .230/.305/.364 with 15 home runs, 62 RBI, and 11 stolen bases. On August 23, 2025, Semien was placed on the injured list due to a left foot contusion. The next day, he was diagnosed with a fractured third metatarsal bone and Lisfranc sprain in his left foot, and was ruled out for the remainder of the season.

=== New York Mets ===
On November 24, 2025, the Rangers traded Semien to the New York Mets for Brandon Nimmo. Semien was placed on the injured list on June 25 due to a strain in his left hip.

== Personal life ==
Semien's mother and father also attended the University of California, Berkeley, where his father, Damien, played football. His uncle, Daryl Semien, is the head baseball coach at Lowell High School in San Francisco.

Semien and his wife have five children. In the off-season, they live in Berkeley, California.

== See also ==
- List of Major League Baseball career runs scored leaders
