= Alexandria Blue Anchors =

- Logo

Information
- League: Northwoods League (North Division)
- Location: Alexandria, Minnesota
- Ballpark: Knute Nelson Memorial Park
- Founded: 2001
- Folded: 2015
- Former name: Alexandria Beetles (2001-2012)
- Colors: Black, blue, light blue, white, beige, gray
- Ownership: Northwoods League
- Management: Northwoods League
- Manager: Al Newman
- Media: Alexandria Echo-Press
- Website: blueanchors.com

The Alexandria Blue Anchors (formerly known as the Alexandria Beetles) was a baseball team that played in the Northwoods League, an NCAA-sanctioned collegiate summer baseball league. The team played at Knute Nelson Memorial Park in Alexandria, Minnesota.

== History ==
The Alexandria Beetles were added to the Northwoods League as an expansion team in 2001, entering the league alongside the Madison Mallards. Playing in purple-tinged uniforms, the Beetles hosted future MLB standouts like Marcus Semien, Allen Craig, and Lucas Duda. In 2013, the team was renamed the Alexandria Blue Anchors in conjunction with the sale of the team to a new local ownership group. The new owners were unable to make the team financially viable, and it was last in attendance in the Northwoods League for the entire time it was the Blue Anchors. The team folded shortly after the 2015 season.

== Alumni in Major League Baseball ==
A total of 18 Alexandria players went on to play in MLB. The following is a complete list.

- Jeremy Accardo
- Matt Beaty (World Series Champion)
- Richard Bleier
- Casey Coleman
- Allen Craig (MLB All-Star, World Series Champion)
- Jermaine Curtis
- Lucas Duda
- Matt Grace
- Bryan Holaday
- Nick Hundley
- Erik Johnson
- Ryan LaMarre
- Zach Muckenhirn
- Carlos Muñiz
- Josh Newman
- Marcus Semien (3x All-Star, 2x Gold Glove, 2x Silver Slugger, World Series Champion)
- Blake Smith
- Danny Worth
