= Allen Craig =

American baseball player (born 1984)

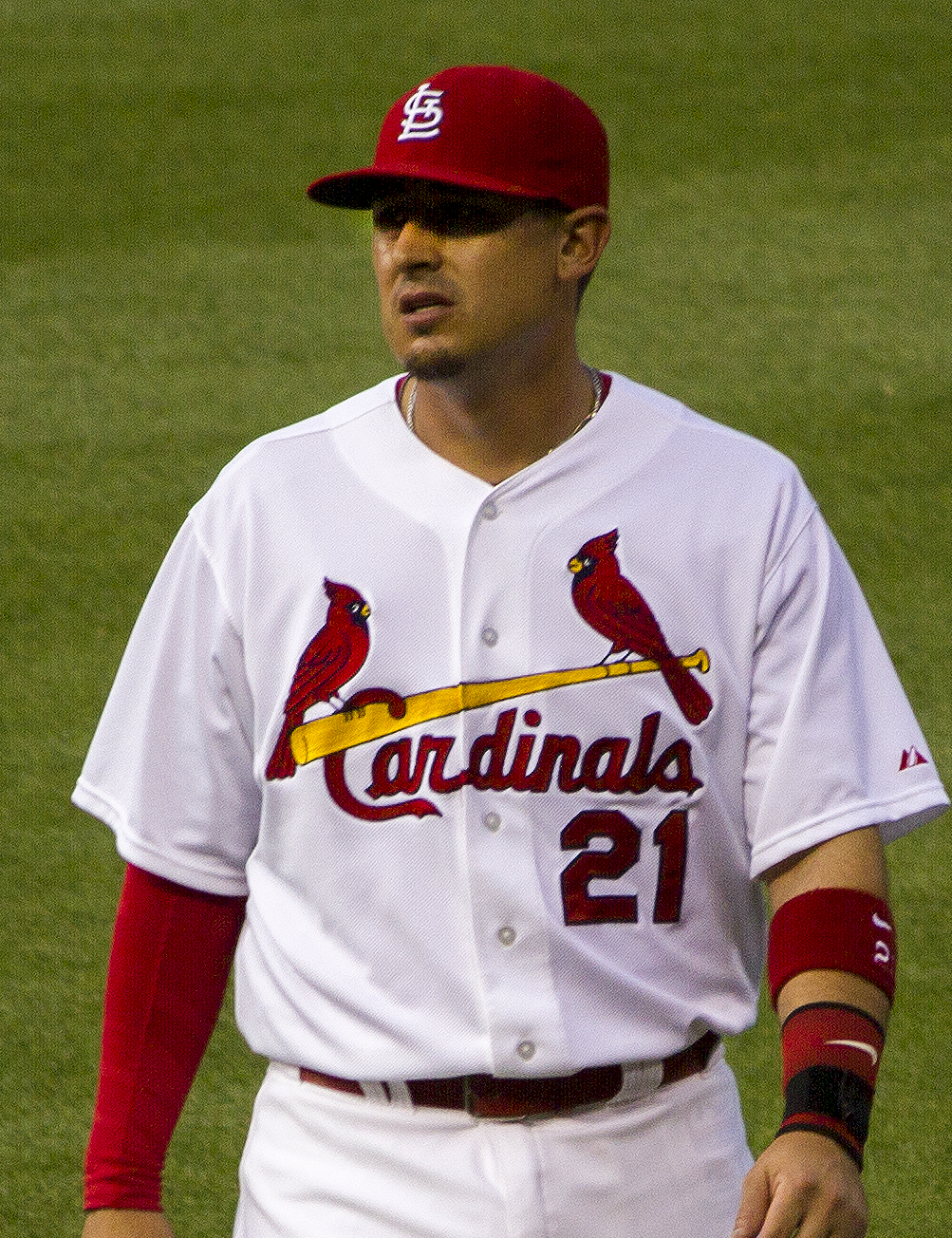
- Craig playing for the St. Louis Cardinals in 2014
- Outfielder / First baseman
- Born: July 18, 1984 (age 42); Mission Viejo, California, U.S.
- Batted: Right Threw: Right

MLB debut
- April 8, 2010, for the St. Louis Cardinals

Last MLB appearance
- October 4, 2015, for the Boston Red Sox

MLB statistics
- Batting average: .276
- Home runs: 59
- Runs batted in: 296
- Stats at Baseball Reference

Teams
- St. Louis Cardinals (2010–2014); Boston Red Sox (2014–2015)

Career highlights and awards
- All-Star (2013); World Series champion (2011)
Medals
Men's baseball
Representing United States
World Junior Baseball Championship
Bronze medal – third place	2002 Sherbrooke	Team

Allen Thomas Craig (born July 18, 1984) is an American former professional baseball outfielder and first baseman. He played in Major League Baseball (MLB) for the St. Louis Cardinals and Boston Red Sox. The Cardinals drafted Craig from the University of California, Berkeley, in 2006, and he made his Major League debut with them in 2010.

Each season in the minor leagues from 2007 to 2009, Craig finished with a batting average of over .300 with at least 20 home runs. A .306 career hitter in MLB through 2013, he increased his production with runners in scoring position (RISP). In 2012, he posted a .400 batting average with RISP. The next season, he raised that figure to .454, the third-highest average of all time.

Craig has appeared in two World Series and in both made history. In the 2011 World Series, he tied a record by collecting three hits that drove in the game-winning run. In 2013, he became the first player to score a game-winning run on an obstruction call.

He is currently an advisor to baseball operations for the San Diego Padres.

== Playing career ==
=== Early life and amateur career ===
Allen Craig was born in Mission Viejo, California, to Ron and Kim Craig and raised in Temecula, California. He has one younger sister named Kendal. His parents had moved to the Temecula Valley in the 1970s so that Mr. Craig could secure employment with the Rancho California Water District. In addition to relocating from Mission Viejo in Orange County to Temecula in Riverside County after Craig's birth, the family shifted residences multiple times before finally settling in Temecula.

Craig's father was an early volunteer to help build the baseball fields that became the Ronald Reagan Sports Complex near Temecula Valley High School in Temecula, California. As soon as he was able to swing a baseball bat, his parents entered him into the national Tee Ball division of Little League Baseball where his father coached and his mother served on the board of directors. While participating on the 14-and-under USA Baseball team, he played games in Venezuela.

At Chaparral High School, Temecula, California, Craig was a two-sport standout athlete in baseball and basketball. As a senior in 2002, Craig was recognized in both sports. He earned first team all-league and all-valley honors in basketball while setting a school record with 94 three-pointers. In baseball, he was named All-Valley Baseball Player of the Year. At the Riverside All-Star Game, he earned the Most Valuable Player (MVP) accolade. His .585 batting average and eight home runs helped energize Chaparral to the Southwest League title. That summer, Craig played for the USA Junior National team, batting .485 with 11 runs scored in their effort to earn a bronze medal at the International Baseball Federation (IBAF) World Junior Championship in Sherbrooke, Quebec.

After high school, Craig attended the University of California, Berkeley, and was a four-year starter for the California Golden Bears baseball team at all four infield positions. Primarily playing shortstop as a freshman, he posted a .353 batting average with runners in scoring position (RISP). He earned Pac-10 Player of the Week honors for February 4–10, 2003, after his 7-for-17 (.412) effort with two doubles, a grand slam and five runs batted in (RBI) at San Francisco and versus Loyola Marymount. Applying more time at first base in his sophomore season, Craig batted .285, led the team with 29 bases on balls (BB) and aggregated 19 multi-hit games. He was an honorable mention for the Pac-10 all-academic team. The next year, Craig started primarily in left field, batted .308 overall, and batted .338 with RISP. Against Washington State, March 22–24, 2005, he put together a 7–13 series (.538). One month later, on April 22, Craig collected three hits in three at-bats and two days later went 4–4; both games were against USC. Craig was an honorable mention for the All-Pacific-10 baseball team and again for the academic team. His career batting numbers at UC Berkeley included a .308 batting average, 27 home runs and 108 RBI.

During his off-season playing time at UC Berkeley, Craig played two campaigns for the Alexandria Beetles (Minnesota) of the Northwoods League (NWL), a collegiate summer baseball league. Craig spent most games at shortstop but also contributed in the outfield, at third base, and first base. His first season was in 2003, after his freshman season at UC. He batted just .229 in 15 games in which his playing time was cut short by injury. He returned in 2005 after his junior season and put together a landmark NWL season that included a 21-game hitting streak. In 49 games, Craig hit .362 with 12 home runs, 17 doubles and 40 RBI. Craig was named first-team shortstop for Baseball America's 2005 College Summer All-America team.

=== Draft and minor leagues ===
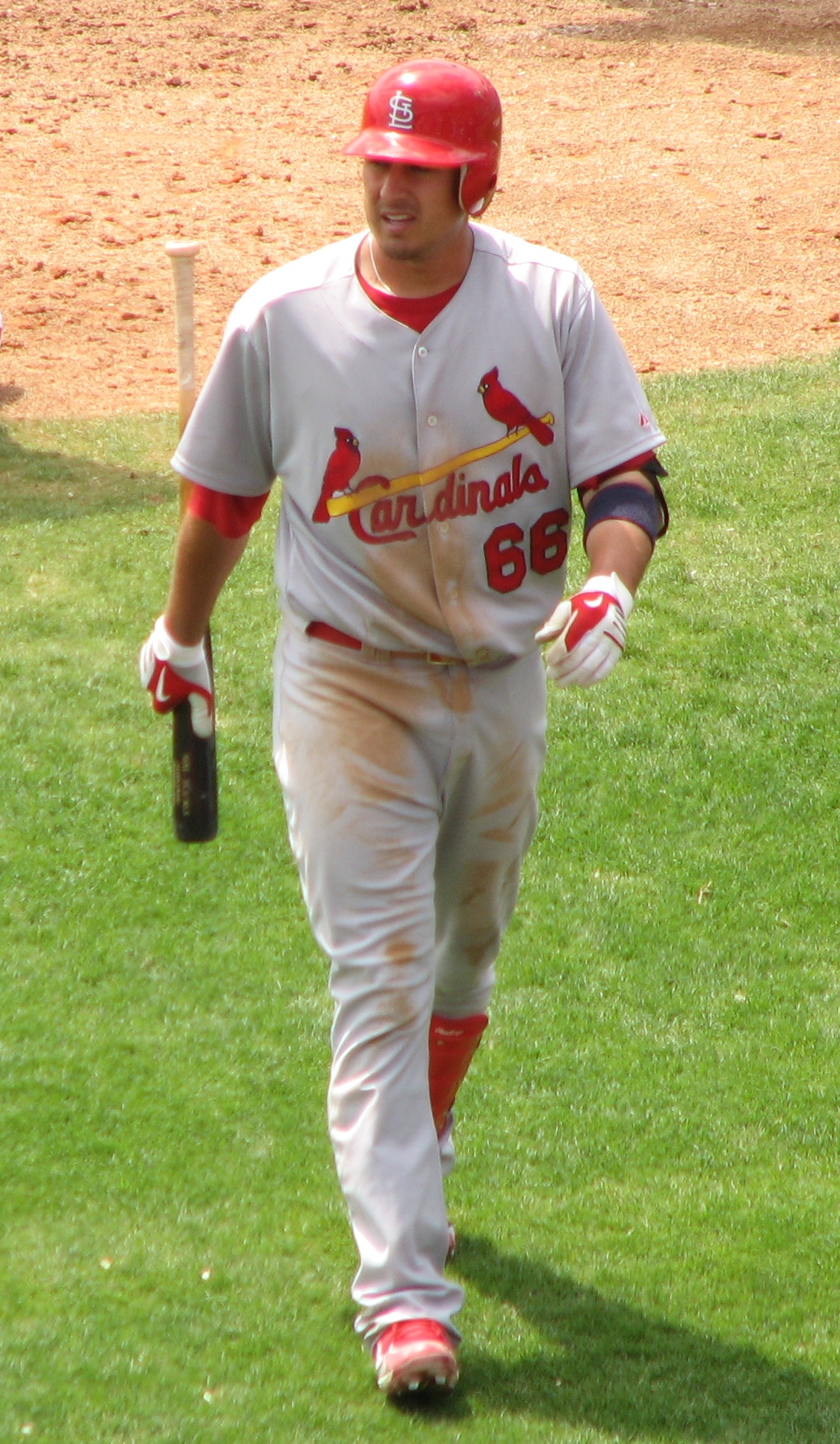
Craig wearing Spring training number, 2010

The Cardinals drafted Craig as a shortstop in the eighth round of the 2006 draft (256th overall) and signed him for $15,000. However, he played just three games at shortstop with the State College Spikes in 2006 before spending the most games playing third base. As a hitter, Craig showed power at all levels of the Cardinal farm system, hitting 76 home runs in a three and one-half season span between 2006 and 2010 that comprised the bulk of his minor league playing time.

In the Florida State League in 2006, he posted an adjusted on-base plus slugging at 26% above league average. His 21 home runs in an environment of primarily humid air and large ballparks brought notice as one of the top minor league hitters. Baseball America ranked him as the Cardinals' number-15 prospect following the season. Each season from 2007 through 2009, Craig progressed from the high-A level to AAA and participated between 119 and 129 games while hitting at least .304 with 22 home runs and 80 RBI.

Although for a time Craig appeared to play adequately at third base, his throwing motion raised questions whether he could play there in the Major Leagues as he was promoted through the minor leagues. With David Freese one step further up the Cardinals depth chart and having the better-regarded glove, Craig was shifted more to the outfield in 2009. He further increased his versatility by playing first base. Despite the defensive transitions, his hitting remained steady as he posted a .921 on-base plus slugging percentage with the AAA Memphis Redbirds. His consistent hitting and increased positional coverage prompted Craig to be named Cardinals system Player of the Year. The club added him to their 40-man roster that November.

After making his Major League debut in April 2010, Craig spent significant time on the Cardinals roster. In addition, he amassed 83 games at Memphis, batting .320 with 14 home runs, 81 RBI and a .549 slugging percentage. The next two seasons, he made 19 more appearances at Memphis, Springfield and Palm Beach, accumulating 20 hits in 69 at-bats with four home runs and 14 RBI.

=== St. Louis Cardinals ===
==== 2010–11 ====
Allen Craig made the Cardinals big-league club out of spring training in 2010 and appeared in his first MLB game on April 8. He started in right field and went 0–4 at the plate against the Cincinnati Reds. Craig hit his first home run on July 19 off the Philadelphia Phillies' Kyle Kendrick. His second home run came on August 22 in the Cardinals' 9–0 drubbing of the San Francisco Giants' Barry Zito. One month later, he hit his third home run in a 7–1 defeat of the Chicago Cubs on September 24 in support of Adam Wainwright's bid for his first 20-win season. In 44 total games in 2010, Craig saw 124 plate appearances (PA), batted .246, hit seven doubles and four home runs with 18 RBI.

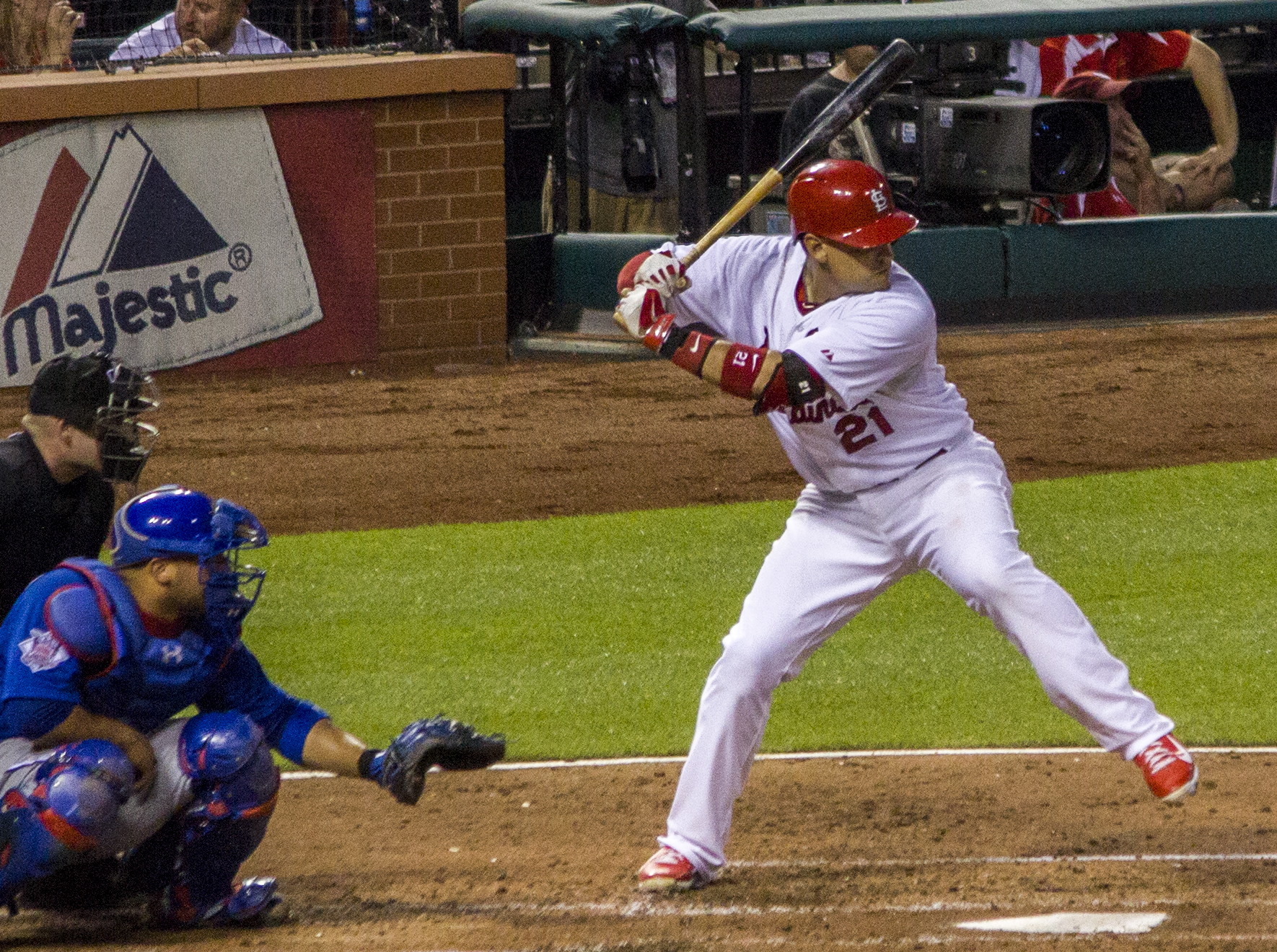
Craig batting against the Chicago Cubs

By 2011, it became apparent that Craig was able to hit major league pitching as well he had in the minor leagues. However, the situation was less than ideal for him to realize regular playing time. Lance Berkman, Matt Holliday, and Albert Pujols each already occupied corner positions first base, left field and right field – positions Craig was best suited to play. To get his bat in the lineup more, manager Tony La Russa began playing him at second base near the end of May.

In June, after batting .336 with 23 RBI in 107 at-bats, he suffered a small knee cap fracture against the Houston Astros by running into the wall tracking a fly ball in right field. The team placed him on the disabled list (DL) with an expected intermission of about six weeks. The healing of the fracture stagnated throughout the season, however, and swelling persisted around the knee, slowing Craig's rehabilitation. Nevertheless, he regularly strengthened the muscles around his patella and was cleared to play after passing a battery of medical tests. He also spent extra time warming up his knee before each game. After his return, Craig hit .290 in 35 games. He ended the regular season with a .315 batting average, 15 doubles, 11 home runs, 40 RBI, and a .555 slugging percentage in 75 games and 219 PA.

The Cardinals made the playoffs that year. Craig struggled in his first ten games covering 21 plate appearances against the Philadelphia Phillies in the National League Division Series (NLDS) and the Milwaukee Brewers in the National League Championship Series (NLCS), collecting just three hits in 17 at-bats. However, he delivered the go-ahead pinch-hit single in Game 6 to send the Cardinals to the World Series.

In the World Series, Craig debuted in Game 1 by hitting a two-out, go-ahead pinch-hit single off Texas Rangers' pitcher Alexi Ogando's fastball. The next night, La Russa again summoned Craig to pinch hit against Ogando. This time, he lined a 96 miles per hour (154 km/h) fastball to right field to break a scoreless tie. On that single, he joined Dusty Rhodes, Del Unser and Hal McRae as the only players to collect pinch-hit RBI in three consecutive postseason at bats. He also joined Duke Snider and Amos Otis as the only hitters with the go-ahead hit in the sixth inning or later in consecutive World Series games. Further, Craig became the first player with two go-ahead RBIs as a pinch-hitter in World Series play. After hitting the go-ahead home run in Game 7, which tied a World Series record Kiki Cuyler and Hank Greenberg shared with three game-winning RBI, Craig caught the last out of the Series, securing the Cardinals' eleventh World Series championship. For the series, Craig appeared in all seven games and collected five hits in 19 at-bats (.263 batting average), three home runs and five RBI for a .737 slugging percentage. His totals in the 2011 postseason included a .622 slugging percentage and 1.013 on-base plus slugging (OPS). However, with his knee cap still not fully healed, Craig elected to have surgery to repair the fracture the following November.

==== 2012 ====
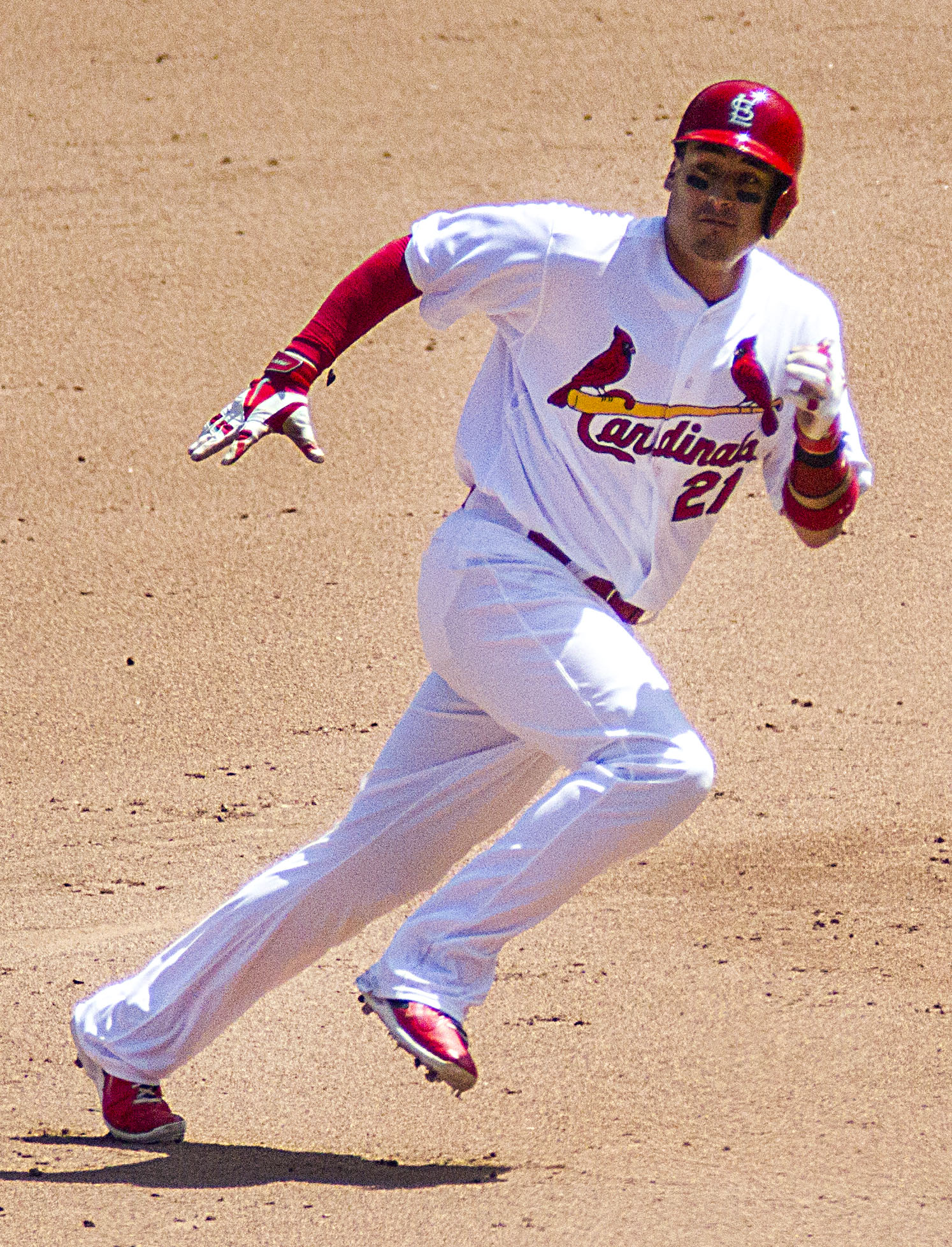
Craig in St. Louis

Despite his strong 2011 performance and World Series exploits, new manager Mike Matheny assigned Craig the role of utility player in the outset of 2012, with the likes of veterans Carlos Beltrán, Berkman, and Holliday already stationed at first base and in the outfield corners. Further, Craig spent all of April on the disabled list (DL) recovering from knee surgery. However, when he returned to play May 1, the Cardinals designated outfielder Erik Komatsu for assignment to make room, and Craig found a windfall of playing time with Berkman now on the DL. After hitting five home runs in a seven-game stretch, injury quickly struck again when he pulled a hamstring in a game against the San Francisco Giants on May 18 and landed back on the 15-day DL. To that point, Craig made a convincing argument for forcing his way into the starting lineup with a combination of top prospect Matt Adams' slumping and hitting .373 with a .424 on-base percentage and .765 slugging percentage in thirteen games.

Craig was back in action on June 1, and three days later, his tiebreaking two-run home run against the Mets allowed the Cardinals to end a five-game losing streak with a 5–4 win. In a stretch from June 9–21, he encountered a rare slump as he batted just .175 with one home run in 11 games. However, Craig discovered that pitchers were throwing him more sliders. Over the next nine games through July 3, he solved his opponents' strategy, batting .364 with five home runs and 15 RBI. His season total to that date included appearing in just 40 of the Cardinals' 80 first games, taking 152 at-bats. Nonetheless, he tied Holliday (296 at-bats), catcher Yadier Molina (265), and third baseman David Freese (276) with 13 home runs. He also carried a .322 batting average with 43 RBI. The RBI total ranked third in the NL since May 1, even with the second DL stay.

Through September 16, he showed that he was adept at hitting with runners in scoring position with a .355 batting average in his 197 career at-bats. Craig was consistent throughout the season, finishing with a .307 average, 22 home runs and 92 RBI in 119 games. He ranked tenth in the NL in batting, seventh in slugging percentage (.522) and placed 19th in the Most Valuable Player award (MVP) balloting. He also led all major leaguers with a .400 batting average with runners in scoring position (RISP). Despite two DL trips, Craig played 30 games in the outfield and led the team in starts at first base with 86, while Berkman appeared in just 32 total games.

==== 2013 ====
With Berkman's departure via free agency, Craig became the Cardinals' primary first baseman. On March 8, the club announced they had reached an agreement with him on a five-year contract with a team option for a sixth season. The $31 million deal bought out his three future arbitration-eligible years and first year of free agency. Craig would earn $13 million in the 2018 season if the Cardinals exercised their option.

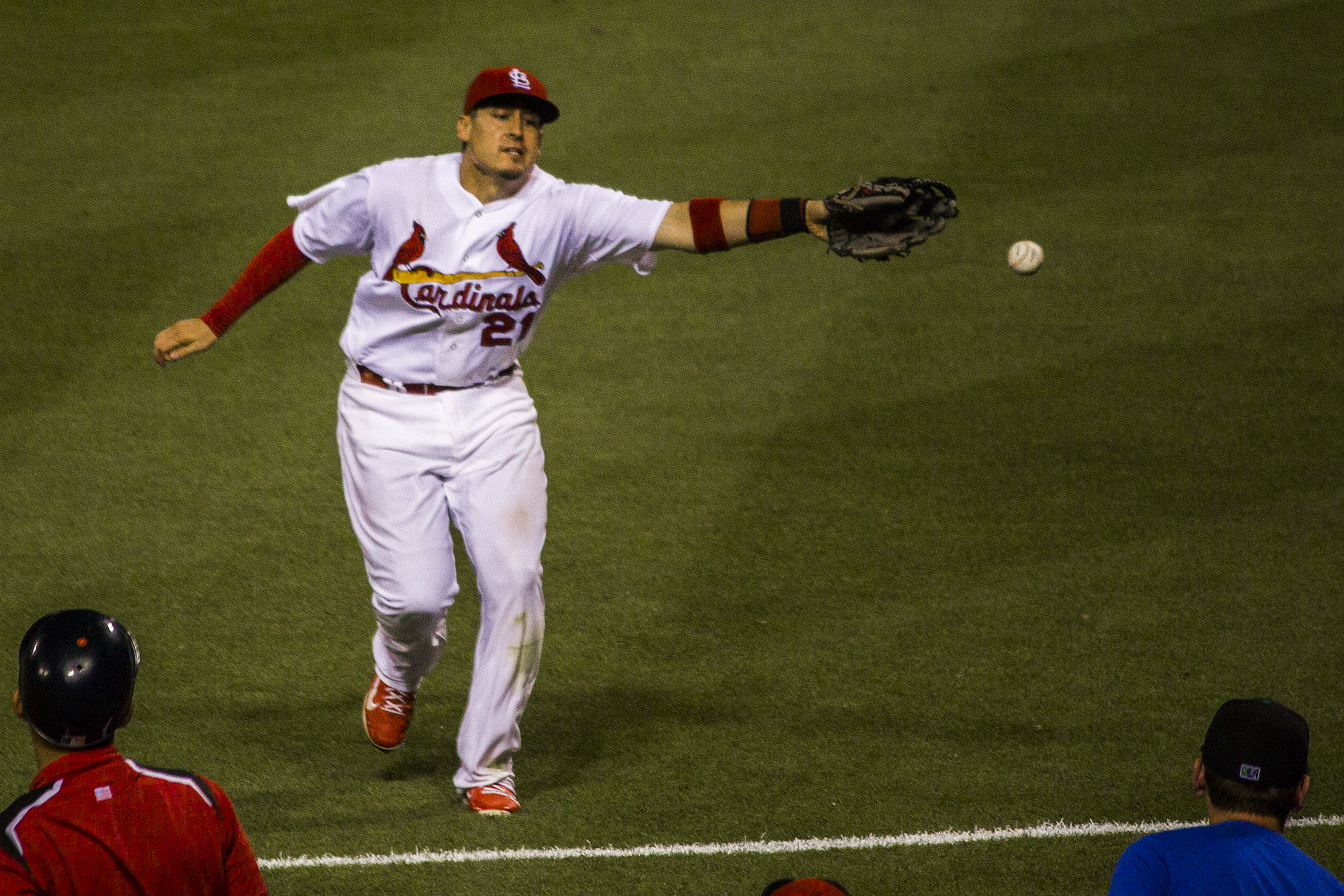
Craig with St. Louis, 2014

In July, National League manager Bruce Bochy selected Craig to his first All-Star Game at Citi Field in Queens, New York City, as a reserve first baseman. His first-half performance included batting .333 with 10 home runs and 74 RBI. Both his RBI and hit totals (116) placed second in the NL. He became the fifth alumnus of the California Golden Bears to be named to an MLB All-Star team.

With his team facing a 5–4 deficit, Craig belted the game-winning grand slam against the division rival Reds on August 26. The final outcome was 8–6. It was his first career grand slam, boosting his totals to seven hits in ten bases-loaded at-bats to go with 20 RBI to that point in the season (14 for 31, .452 batting average for his career). He was also batting .452 with runners in scoring position – again leading the Major Leagues – and it was the third-highest of all time for a single season, after George Brett (.469, 1980) and Tony Gwynn (.459, 1997).

A Lisfranc injury on September 4 on an infield hit against the Reds prevented him from appearing in a game for the rest of the regular season. At the time, he was third in the NL in RBI with 97. He eventually finished eighth. Despite being shut down early, he led Cardinals in this category. St. Louis Post-Dispatch sportswriter Bernie Miklasz dubbed Craig "The Clutchmaster", "The RBI Machine" and "an RBI Monster". He also finished eighth in batting average (.315). His final batting average with RISP –.454 – remained the Major-League high and third-highest all-time. That figure surpassed Brian Jordan's average of .422 in 1996 (62 of 147) as the team record. In spite of his success hitting with RISP, Baseball-Reference.com rated his Wins Above Replacement (WAR) at 2.2 and Fangraphs at 2.6.

Craig's chances of returning to play before the end of the season depended on how far the Cardinals could extend their season in the playoffs. They qualified for the postseason by finishing with the best regular season record (97–65) in the National League. They kept winning through the playoffs, defeating the Pittsburgh Pirates in the NLDS and the Los Angeles Dodgers in the NLCS. Ready as a hitter in time for the World Series against the Boston Red Sox, Matheny at first excluded him from defense as the injury was not fully healed. Therefore, he served as the designated hitter (DH) at Fenway Park in Boston and a pinch hitter at Busch Stadium in St. Louis, a National League park where the DH is not normally played.

In Game 3, Craig was part of an unusual, game-ending, play. With the scored tied 4–4 in the bottom of the ninth, Cardinals center fielder Jon Jay hit a ground ball off pitcher Koji Uehara toward second baseman Dustin Pedroia, who threw the ball home to catcher Jarrod Saltalamacchia to easily tag Yadier Molina out attempting to score. Saltalamacchia then threw the ball to Will Middlebrooks as Craig rounded third, but it sailed wide into left field for an error, and, at the same time, Middlebrooks tripped Craig while reaching for the ball. Daniel Nava recovered the ball and threw it back to home plate long before Craig would have successfully scored. Due to being tripped, umpire Jim Joyce awarded Craig home plate when he called an obstruction on Middlebrooks, giving the Cardinals a 5–4 walk-off victory. This is the first known such walk-off victory in World Series history. However, the Cardinals lost the series to the Red Sox in six games. Craig batted 16 times and collected six hits for a .375 batting average. After the season, he finished 21st in the MVP balloting, but likely would have finished much higher had he not missed nearly a month of the season due to injury.

==== 2014 ====
With another free agent departure in Beltrán, Craig again shifted positions in 2014, replacing him in right field. It also cleared the way for Matt Adams to assume first base. Craig started the season slowly, batting just .220 with a .644 OPS in April. He batted .291 and raised his OPS to .781 in May.

=== Boston Red Sox ===
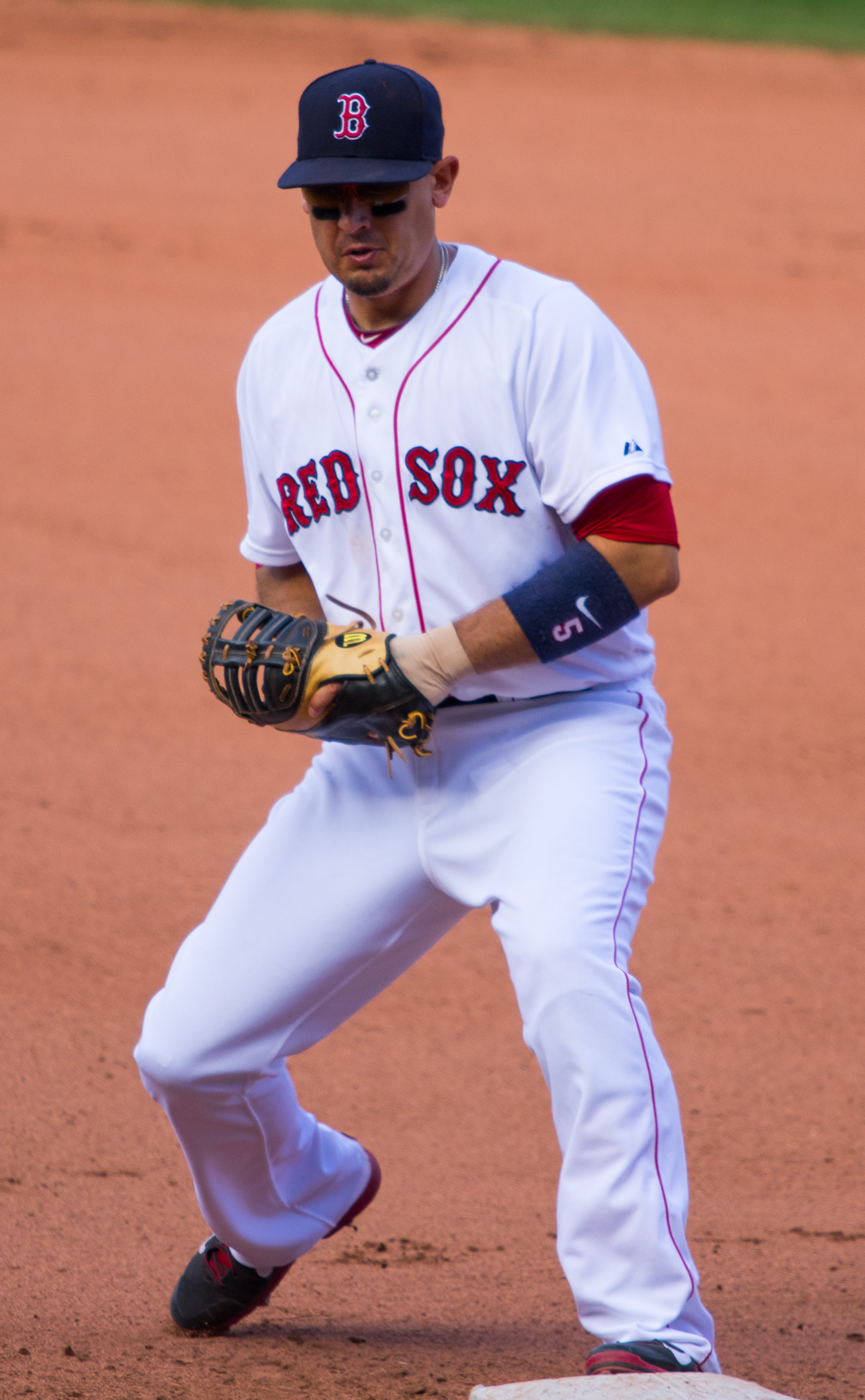
Craig with Boston, 2014

On July 31, 2014, Craig was traded along with Joe Kelly to the Red Sox in exchange for John Lackey and prospect Corey Littrell. Upon being inserted into the Red Sox lineup, Craig struggled mightily towards the last two months of the season, hitting only .128 while striking out 36 times. The following season, Craig began the season as Boston's starting first baseman. On May 9, 2015, the Red Sox optioned Craig to the Pawtucket Red Sox of the Triple–A International League; since Craig had yet to accrue five years of service time, the Red Sox could option him to the minor leagues without his consent. On May 18, they outrighted him to the minors, removing him from the 40 man roster. He was re-added to the major league roster on September 1. Over 93 games with Pawtucket, he batted .274 with four home runs and thirty RBIs, and over 36 games with Boston, he batted .152. Craig returned to Pawtucket in 2016, but missed a majority of the season due to injury. He also returned to Pawtucket in 2017, but on June 30, was released.

=== San Diego Padres ===
On January 22, 2018, Craig signed a minor league contract with the San Diego Padres. Over 92 games with the Triple–A El Paso Chihuahuas, he slashed .293/.375/.479 with 13 home runs and 59 RBI. Craig elected free agency following the season on November 2.

Craig re-signed with the Padres on a minor league contract on December 19, 2018. He was released by the Padres organization on March 19, 2019.

== Post-playing career ==
Craig retired from baseball on April 12, 2019, and joined the San Diego Padres front office as an advisor to baseball operations. On January 30, 2024, it was announced that Craig would assume a role that will see him interact with the MLB team and minor league affiliates as an assistant.

== Skills profile ==
While still in the minor leagues, Craig showed in little time that he could hit at all levels but he had no natural position. In spite of the challenge to categorize his defensive abilities, his versatility and athleticism has allowed him to play at all positions in the major leagues except pitcher, shortstop, and catcher. After an experiment at second base early in his Major League career, first base and the corners in the outfield emerged as the positions for which he was best suited. He played shortstop in amateur ball and third base in the minor leagues, but he was not well-suited to play either position in the major leagues, due to the speed of the game. He posted a fielding percentage of just .927 in 246 minor league games at third base, considered a very low percentage.

According to former Cardinals player development executive Jeff Luhnow and Memphis Redbirds manager Ron Warner, Craig's arm, range and footwork proved problematic for third base. He improved his footwork well enough for the Texas League, but they still considered it insufficient for the major leagues because his movement to his left was inhibited, restricting his ability to start double plays. Further, with an inefficient, semi-sidearm throwing motion that he could not resolve, Craig relied on his innate strength to compensate for time lost.

== Awards and honors ==
Awards
Title	# of times	Dates (Ranking or event)	Refs
**Major leagues**
Major League Baseball World Series Champion	1	2011	
Major League Baseball All-Star	1	2013	
**Minor leagues**
Minor leagues All-Star	5	2006 midseason (New York–Penn League), 2007 midseason and postseason (Florida State League), 2008 midseason and postseason (Texas League)	
Minor leagues All-Star game Top Star	1	2007 (Florida State League)	
Baseball America's Cardinals' top prospects	4	2007 (#15), 2008 (#26), 2009 (#7), 2010 (#5)	
Baseball America's Cardinals' best minor league power hitter	2	2009, 2010	
Cardinals system Player of the Year	1	2009	
Cardinals organization Player of the Month	2	June 2007, July 2009	
The Cardinal Nation/Scout.com Top Prospect	2	2010 (#7), 2011 (#7)	
**College**
Baseball America All-American First Team	1	2005 (SS)	

Top ten National League finishes
Statistical category	# of times	Season (Rank, description)
Batting average	2	2012 (7th, .307), 2013 (8th, .315)
Batting average with runners in scoring position	2	2012 (**1st, .400**)^{†}, 2013 (**1st, .454**)^{†}
Slugging percentage	1	2012 (7th, .522)
Runs batted in	1	2013 (8th, 97)

Bold: led National League
†: led all Major Leagues

== Personal life ==
Craig holds a degree in Social Welfare from the University of California, Berkeley. When growing up, his favorite baseball player was Ken Griffey Jr. He was also a fan of Cal Ripken Jr. Craig attended high school with Brandon Snider, the grandson of Duke Snider, with whom he tied the World Series consecutive pinch hit mark.

On November 12, 2011, Craig married Marie LaMarca, who was also a graduate of Chaparral High School. The couple reside in their mutual hometown of Temecuca with their two daughters and pet tortoise, Torty. Torty, a tortoise Craig has owned since it was a hatchling, has a Twitter account and has been called a mascot for the Cardinals.

In May 2014, Craig partnered with fellow Cardinals outfielder Jon Jay for the Jay-Craig Celebrity Bowl and the Flamingo Bowl in downtown St. Louis. The proceeds benefited Great Circle, a nonprofit organization that provides behavioral health services autism, educational challenges, emotional health, in-home crisis intervention, foster care and adoption, adventure therapy and psychological trauma recovery.

== See also ==
- Batting average with runners in scoring position
