= Knute Nelson Memorial Park =

Baseball venue located in Alexandria, Minnesota

- Ship Yard
- Interactive map of Knute Nelson Memorial Park
- Full name: Knute Nelson Memorial Ballpark
- Former names: City Athletic Field
- Location: Alexandria, Minnesota, USA
- Coordinates: 45.887443°N 95.381166°W

Construction
- Built: 1938
- Renovated: 1967

Tenant
- Alexandria Blue Anchors (NWL) (2001-2015) Willmar Stingers (NWL) (2016-present) One game a year

Knute Nelson Memorial Park is a baseball venue located in Alexandria, Minnesota, United States. The park was opened in 1938 (as City Athletic Field) and renovated in 1967. It was named for former Governor of Minnesota and U.S. Senator Knute Nelson.

Knute Nelson Memorial Park was the home of the Alexandria Blue Anchors of the Northwoods League, a collegiate summer baseball league. The team's first game was played on June 1, 2001, when former Major League Baseball reliever Goose Gossage threw out the first pitch.

Since 2016 one night a season, you can still see the Beetles play in the ballpark as the Willmar Stingers become the Alexandria Beetles for a night. It pays homage to a time that once was when Alexandria had their own team. Over the past four seasons, the Willmar Stingers have played as the Beetles they have a 4-1 record. In 2019, the Beetles won a game against the La Crosse Loggers 14-4. On this night over 1,300 people from the community showed up to see their team play with the hope that someday a Northwoods League team will return to Alexandria. In July 2020, the Beetles returned to action in an exhibition game against the Willmar Stingers in a game the Beetles won 9-8. The Beetles plan to return to action in 2021.

== Layout ==
The field's layout places Lake Winona directly past the center field fence. The majority of the seating is behind home plate and along the third base line, as residential areas located close to the field prevent further expansion along the first base line.

The stadium's capacity is 1500, and is generally about two-thirds full. Seating includes a grandstand for season-ticket holders; bleachers down the foul lines; and two party decks. Though the intimate stadium does not have traditional concourses, it has enough room behind and in-between the seating areas for concession stands and carnival-style promotions. The atmosphere is distinctively small-town midwestern. During games, children wander about chasing the mascot and playing with one another. The location is just two blocks from the center of town. Since only 10,000 people live in Alexandria, about 10% of the populace heads to the ballpark on summer nights.
