= Water Mission =

American humanitarian organization

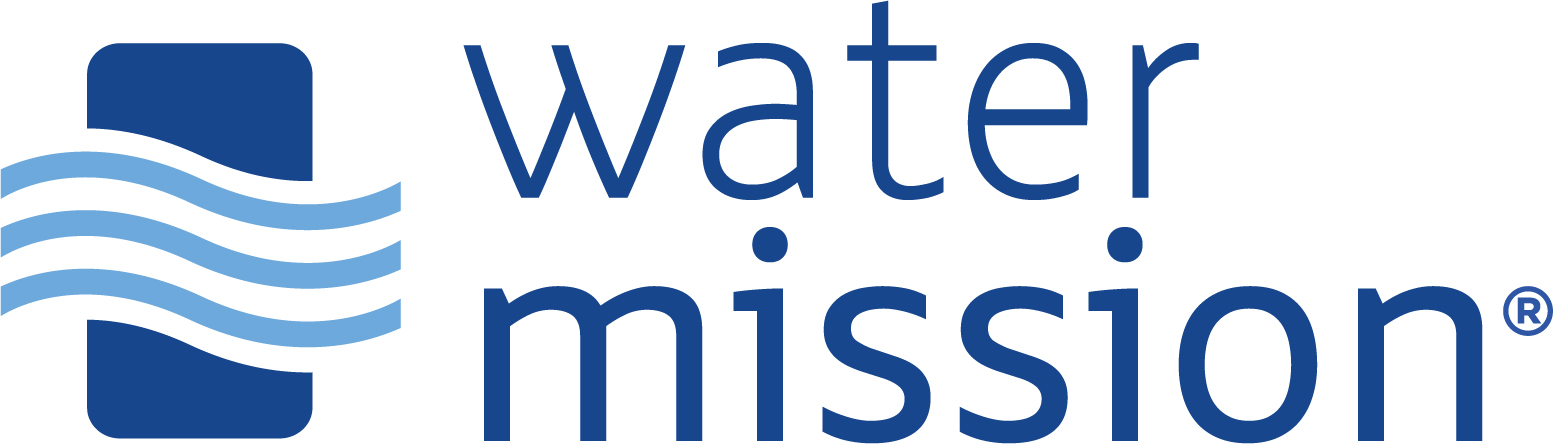
- Founded: 2001
- Founder: George and Molly Greene
- Type: Non-Government Organization
- Purpose: Community development programs and disaster relief
- Location: North Charleston, South Carolina, U.S.
- Region served: 52 countries
- Method: Safe water projects in developing countries and disaster areas
- Revenue: USD $31,058,784 (2018)
- Website: www.watermission.org

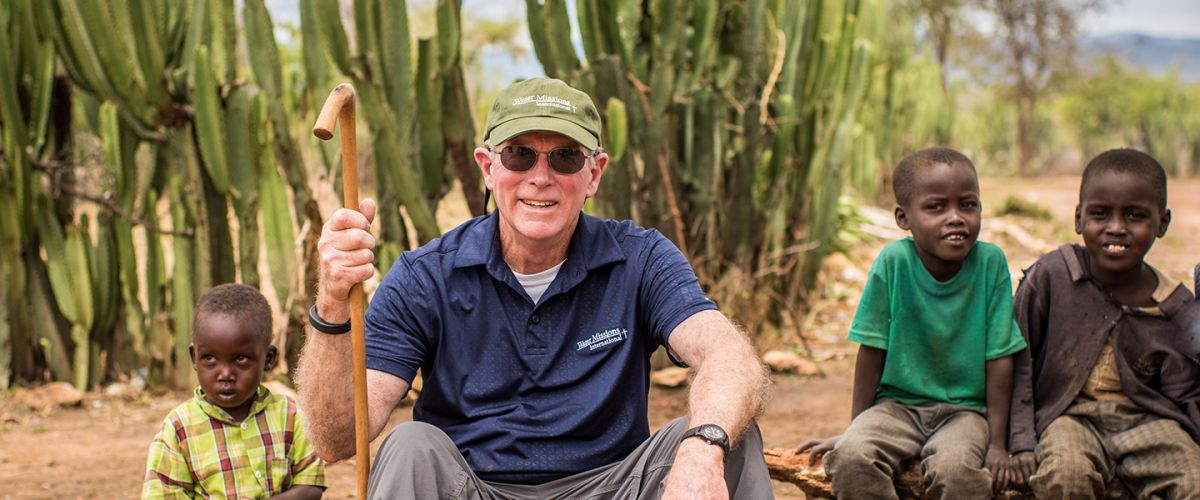
Co-founder George Greene

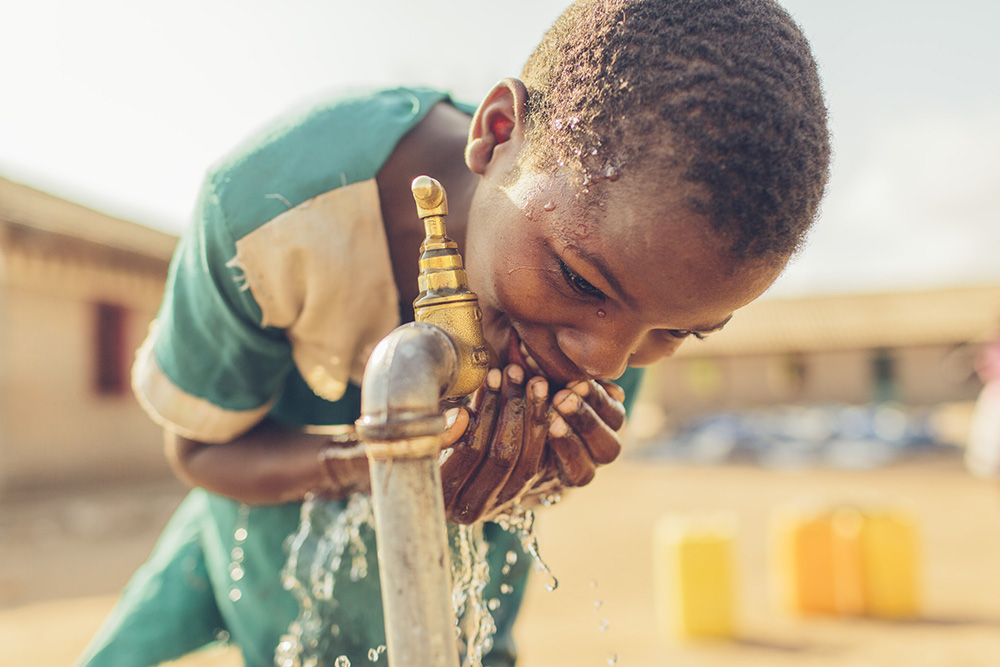
13-year-old student from Malawi now has access to safe water thanks to Water Mission.

Water Mission (previously known as Water Missions International) is a nonprofit, Christian engineering organization. Water Mission's global headquarters is located in North Charleston, South Carolina, U.S. where the organization designs, builds and implements safe water, sanitation and hygiene (WASH) solutions for people in developing countries and disaster areas. Water Mission hosts the Walk For Water, an annual fundraiser which attracted five thousand people in 2019.

Water Mission's goal is to solve the global water crisis. In 2020, Water Mission served 1.1 million people and has in total provided access to safe water for more than seven million people in 57 countries. Water Mission has completed 2,800 water projects and has more than 400 staff members working around the world in permanent country programs located in Africa, Asia, North, South, and Central America, and the Caribbean.

== History ==
In 1998, under the direction of George and Molly Greene, General Engineering Laboratories responded to the devastation in Honduras caused by Hurricane Mitch. They designed, constructed and delivered six drinking water treatment units, each capable of producing safe drinking water at the rate of 10 gallons per minute. Within three weeks of the hurricane, sixteen volunteers from the company were in remote locations of Honduras setting up these water treatment units. This initial effort was called "Project Living Water" and the water treatment unit became known as the Living Water Treatment System (LWTS). Most recently, they responded to the 2015 Nepal earthquake, with both Living Water Treatment Systems and Erosion Chlorinators being installed at numerous locations throughout Kathmandu and the surrounding area.

Out of this effort, Water Mission was founded. George and Molly went on to sell General Engineering Laboratories and Water Missions International was officially established as a 501(c)(3) non-profit in 2001. WMI now has country programs with full-time staff located in Belize, Haiti, Honduras, Indonesia, Kenya, Malawi, Mexico, and Uganda. "In 2004, the water mission sent more than 100 purification systems to communities in Indonesia and Sri Lanka after the deadly tsunami, restoring drinking water to hundreds of thousands of people." They responded to the 2010 Haiti earthquake, with both Living Water Treatment Systems and Erosion Chlorinators being installed at numerous locations throughout Port-au-Prince and the surrounding area.
