= Scoring position =

Baseball concept

In the sport of baseball, a baserunner is said to be in scoring position when they are on second or third base. The distinction between being on first base and second or third base is that a runner on first can usually only score if the batter hits an extra-base hit, while a runner on second or third can usually score on a single. Many of baseball's "small ball" or "one run" tactics center on attempts to move a runner on base into scoring position. Such tactics were dominant in the 1890s and the dead-ball era, when extra-base hits were relatively rare. Runners in scoring position are sometimes colloquially referred to as "ducks on the pond".

Runners left in scoring position refers to the number of runners on second or third at the end of an inning and is an inverse measure of a team's offensive efficiency.

== Batting average with runners in scoring position ==
Batting average with runners in scoring position (abbreviated BA/RISP or BA/RSP) is a baseball statistic derived by dividing a players hits with runners in scoring positions by their at bats with runners in scoring position.

BA/RISP is often used as an indicator of clutch ability, as a hit with a runner on second base or third will likely score the runner and is thus considered a clutch situation. Recently, however, the statistic has been replaced with Win Probability Added, considered to be a better measure of clutch ability.

A variation to this statistic is called Batting Average with two outs and Runners in Scoring Position, which is also calculated by dividing a players' hits with runners on second or third by their at bats in this situation. A hit is more likely to score at least one or two runs-depending on the speed of the runner, the strength of the outfielder's arm, the number of runners in scoring position, etc.-because the runners will be going on contact—that is, they run once the batter hits the ball. But if the batter records an out, then the inning ends with those runners left on base.

=== Highest all-time single-season batting averages with runners in scoring position ===
Minimum 100 at bats; through 2023.

#	Player	Avg	Team(s)	Year
1	George Brett	.469	Kansas City	1980
2	Tony Gwynn	.458	San Diego	1997
3	Allen Craig	.454	St. Louis	2013
4	Ichiro Suzuki	.445	Seattle	2001
5	Mickey Mantle	.444	New York (AL)	1956
6	Paul Molitor	.444	Milwaukee	1987
7	Freddie Freeman	.443	Atlanta	2013
8	Ted Williams	.442	Boston (AL)	1948
9	Manny Ramírez	.435	Boston	2002
10	Luis Arraez	.434	Miami	2023
