= 2012 Philadelphia Phillies season =

Major League Baseball season

2012 Philadelphia Phillies
- League: National League
- Division: East
- Ballpark: Citizens Bank Park
- City: Philadelphia, Pennsylvania
- Record: 81–81 (.500)
- Divisional place: 3rd
- Owners: Bill Giles; David Montgomery
- General managers: Rubén Amaro Jr.
- Managers: Charlie Manuel
- Television: Comcast SportsNet Philadelphia; Comcast Network Philadelphia; PHL17 (MyNetworkTV) (Tom McCarthy, Chris Wheeler, Gary Matthews)
- Radio: Phillies Radio Network; WPHT 1210 AM & WIP 94.1 FM (English) (Scott Franzke, Larry Andersen, Jim Jackson); WDAS 1480 AM (Spanish) (Danny Martinez, Bill Kulik, Rickie Ricardo)
- Stats: ESPN.com; Baseball Reference

The Philadelphia Phillies 2012 season was the 130th season in the history of the franchise. The Phillies attempted to win the division title for the sixth year in a row. But with injuries to star players Chase Utley, Ryan Howard, Roy Halladay, and Cliff Lee, they were eliminated from playoff contention on September 28, finished in third place of the National League East with a record of 81–81, and missed the postseason for the first time since 2006.

== Offseason ==
The offseason for the Phillies began on October 7, following their devastating loss in the NLDS to the St. Louis Cardinals. Ryan Howard tore his Achilles tendon, that he would miss the first 3 months of the 2012 season. On November 5, the Phillies signed long-time veteran slugger Jim Thome to a 1-year deal, worth $1.25 million. Additionally, after numerous rumors, on November 14 the Phillies signed RHP Jonathan Papelbon to a 4-year deal, worth $50 million. The Phillies also added pitcher Dontrelle Willis from the Cincinnati Reds, on a 1-year deal, worth 1 million dollars, but released him toward the end of spring training. Laynce Nix was signed as a free agent and Ty Wigginton was acquired through a trade with the Colorado Rockies to shore up the bench. Several other veteran players including Dave Bush, Joel Piñeiro, Scott Elarton, Lou Montanez, and Scott Podsednik were signed to minor league deals with invitations to spring training.

== Regular season ==
=== April ===
==== Opening Day ====
The Phillies opened the season in Pittsburgh in a 3-game series with the Pirates. The Phillies begin the season without first baseman Ryan Howard who tore his Achilles tendon in last year's NLDS. Opening Day went as the Phillies drew it up, Roy Halladay threw 8 scoreless innings, and offseason acquisition Jonathan Papelbon retired all 3 batters he faced for a 1–0 Phillies victory. These were the starters on Opening Day for the Phillies:

Position	Name
Starting Pitcher	Roy Halladay
Catcher	Carlos Ruiz
First Baseman	Ty Wigginton
Second Baseman	Freddy Galvis
Third Baseman	Plácido Polanco
Shortstop	Jimmy Rollins
Left Fielder	John Mayberry Jr.
Center Fielder	Shane Victorino
Right Fielder	Hunter Pence

The Phillies would end up losing the series to Pittsburgh. The Phillies home opener was a disaster, losing to the newly revived Miami Marlins, 6-2. Halladay would end the three game skid, with another solid performance on the mound, as the Phillies won 7–1. The Phillies would end up winning the series the next day, with a 3–1 victory. The Phillies would then go on to trade two wins and losses for the next 8 games. In mid-April, the Phillies began their first major road trip of the season. They began the trip by taking 1 of 3 from the Giants. It was in the second game of the series, when Cliff Lee threw 10 scoreless innings, and ultimately not only did the Phillies lose the game in 11 innings, but Cliff Lee was placed on the 15-day DL with a left external oblique strain. After splitting a 4-game series with San Diego, the Phillies finally won a series against the Diamondbacks, taking 2 of 3. The Phillies finally returned home for a four-game series with the Cubs, where they would split the series. Roy Halladay and Cole Hamels each finished April with 3 wins, and Papelbon was a perfect 8 for 8 on save opportunities. The Phillies finished April with a record of 11–12, their first losing-record month since going 11–15 in June 2009. However, the Phillies have experienced struggle in April before, most notably in 2008, when they would eventually win the World Series, and in 2009, when they would eventually win the National League pennant.

=== May ===
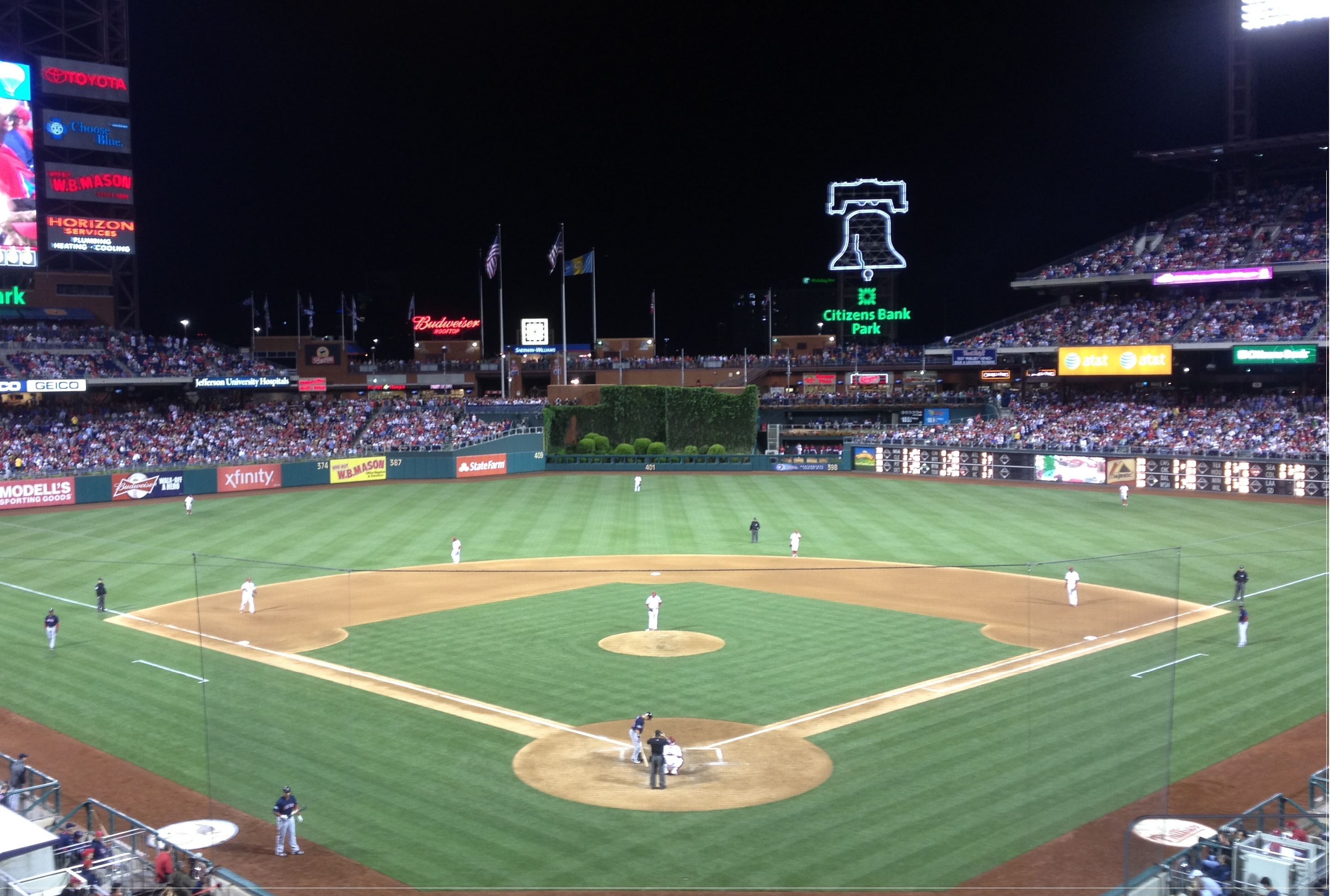
Phillies playing against the Red Sox on May 18

The Phillies began May by taking two of three from the division-leading Braves. The only loss came in an 11-inning game, won by a walk-off home run by Chipper Jones.

The Phillies next series against the Washington Nationals began in the offseason. Andrew Feffer, the Nationals chief operating officer, launched a campaign in the offseason for the first home series against the Phillies to "Take Back the Park." In prior years, Nationals Park has been taken over by Phillies fans who could not get tickets for a home game, and the crowd was at times made up of over 80% Phillies fans. The park was publicly referred to by Phillies fans as "Citizens Bank Park South." To avoid this, Feffer allowed only those with Maryland, Virginia, or D.C. addressed credit cards to purchase tickets. Once the series came near, the Nationals released an official "Fans Guide to Natitude Weekend", which explained fans how to approach the series, and gave them guidelines on how to cheer for their home team. Once the series came, it was the Nationals who were in 1st place in the division, and the Phillies who were at the bottom. The first game of the series went into extra innings, with the Nationals taking game 1, 4–3. Charlie Manuel was ejected in the game in the 1st inning, it was his first ejection of the season. The Nationals also took game two of the series by a score of 7–1. However, the Phillies took the third game by a convincing 9–3 victory. In the game, former Phillie Jayson Werth broke his wrist, and while leaving the field, was heckled by a couple of Phillies fans. Following the game in an email to The Washington Post, Werth wrote "I am motivated to get back quickly and see to it personally those people never walk down Broad Street in celebration again." Despite an attempt to be shut out, many Phillies fans still made the trip to Washington, many of them sporting their "Occupy Nationals Park" T-shirts.

Following the series in Washington, the Phillies returned home for a three-game set with the Mets. During that stretch, the Phillies had a difficult time advancing runners that were in scoring position, and as a result, they were swept. It must have been a wake-up call because the Phillies would go on to take 2 of 3 from the Padres, and sweep both the Houston Astros and the Chicago Cubs. The final victory against the Cubs put the Phillies over the .500 mark for the first time since Opening Day. The Phillies would then open inter league play against the Boston Red Sox, and would win the first game 6–4. They would then lose the next two games, and open up another three game set against the Nationals. The outcome of was the same as earlier in Washington, the Phillies would drop the first two games of the series, and then behind Cole Hamels, the Phillies would win the third game to end their losing skid at 4. The Phillies began to pick it up at the end of May; taking 3 of 4 from the St. Louis Cardinals. However, in the 4th game of the series, after giving up a 1st inning grand slam to Yadier Molina, Roy Halladay left the game after 2 innings due to soreness in his shoulder. It would turn out that Halladay would need surgery on his shoulder, and he would miss 6–8 weeks. However, after seeing a second doctor, it was concluded that Halladay may not need surgery, and needed to simply rest for a minimum of three weeks. The Phillies finished May by taking 2 of 3 from the Mets, behind solid pitching performances from Hamels and Cliff Lee. Hamels finished May leading the Majors with 8 wins, and Jonathan Papelbon continued his dominance as a closer, finishing 2nd in the Majors with 14 saves. The Phillies finished May with a 27–25 record, just 3 games out of the 1st place Nationals in the NL East.

=== June ===
The Phillies entered June with a record of 27–25 and 3 games behind the Washington Nationals for first place in the East Division. The Phillies started the month by winning the first game to the Miami Marlins, but then lost the next 2. The Phillies struggled in the next series against the Los Angeles Dodgers, losing all 4 games in the series, causing them to slump to a 6-game losing streak and 5.5 games behind the Nationals. The Phillies then won 1 of 3 games against the Baltimore Orioles and 2 of 3 games against the Minnesota Twins. However, they would get swept by the Toronto Blue Jays In game 2 of the series, it looked like Cliff Lee was about to finally get his first win of the season, but the Phillies ended up blowing a 5–2 lead in extra innings. Then the Phillies won 2 of 3 games against the struggling Colorado Rockies In the next series against the Tampa Bay Rays, game 1 was postponed to a double header on the same day as game 3. In game 2 of the series, however, the Phillies took a 2-run lead heading into the top of the 9th inning. The Rays however ended up tying the game, putting the game tied at 6–6 heading into the bottom of 9th inning. In the inning, Jim Thome hit a walk-off home run, giving the Phillies the win and putting Thome in 1st place in career walk-off homers. The Phillies would lose both games the next day, though. In the next series against the Pittsburgh Pirates, the Phillies would win the first 2 games of the series, but then lose the next 2. The Phillies would end the month by getting swept by the Marlins. By the end of July 1, the Phillies were 11 games behind the 1st place Nationals. At the end of the month, The Phillies traded Jim Thome to the Orioles for Class A players Gabriel Lino and Kyle Simon.

=== July ===
The Phillies were 36–45 and 11 games behind the first place Nationals after their series against the Marlins. The Phillies started the month by taking 1 of 3 from the New York Mets. The one win, however, came with Cliff Lee finally winning his first game of the season after 13 starts. The streak tied for 5th for the longest winless streak for a pitcher. On July 6, first baseman Ryan Howard was activated from the disabled list. The Phillies would end the first half by getting swept by the Atlanta Braves. They ended the first half with a disastrous 37–50 mark, their worst since 1997. The Phillies seemed to have woken up in the second half, as they would take 2 of 3 from the Colorado Rockies and Los Angeles Dodgers. Although they only took 1 of 3 from the San Francisco Giants, they would make it up by sweeping the Milwaukee Brewers, all from late comebacks. The sweep was their first 3-game sweep of the year. The sweep, however, got taken back by the Braves as they would get swept by them again because they had a hard time with runners in scoring position. The sweep woke up the Phillies, as they would blow out the Washington Nationals in the 1st game of the series on July 31, 8–0. The Phillies would end up taking 2 of 3 from the Nationals. After the series against the Nationals on August 2, the Phillies were 47–58, 15 and a half games behind the first place Nationals, and 13 game behind the second wild card. Although their playoff chances are slim, the Phillies performance after the all-star break looked promising for next season. Throughout the month, knowing that they will likely not make the postseason, the Phillies made trades with some of their players. One of the trades were Hunter Pence getting traded to the Giants for Nate Schierholtz, Tommy Joseph, and Seth Rosin. Another trade was Shane Victorino getting trading to the Dodgers for 2 pitchers. Pitcher Joe Blanton was also traded to the Dodgers. The Phillies would also resign Cole Hamels to a six-year, $144 million extension, the second-largest contract for a pitcher in baseball history.

=== August ===
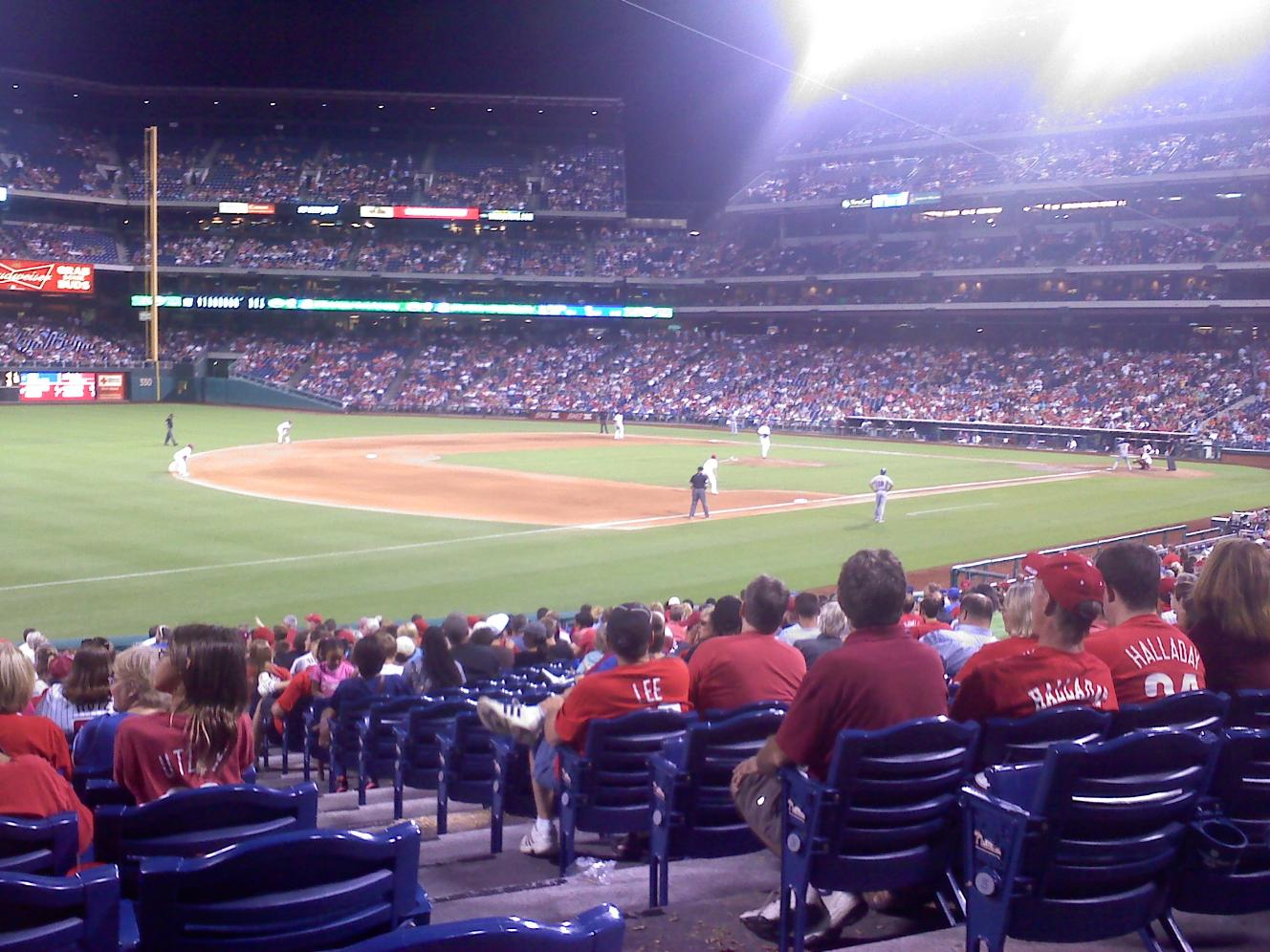
Phillies playing the Nationals on August 25

The Phillies were 47–58, 15 1/2 games behind the first-place Nationals, and 10 games behind the second wild card after their series against the Nationals on August 2. The Phillies started the month by taking 2 of 3 from the Arizona Diamondbacks. The game 3 victory was huge for Ryan Howard, who had struggled since coming off his injury. After getting booed by striking out when the game was tied in the 8th inning with the bases loaded, Ryan Howard came through by hitting an RBI single with the bases loaded in the ninth inning to win the game and the series. The victory also put them out of last place in the NL East for the first time since June 27. The Phillies then took 1 of 3 from the Braves, a team that they got swept by in the past 2 series. In game 1 of the series, the Phillies saw their sellout streak end when the Phillies did not have a sell-out crowd. This ended their streak at 257 games, the third-longest sellout streak in MLB history. The Phillies then took 2 of 3 from the St. Louis Cardinals and came back from 3 runs down to win game 3 in extra innings. The Phillies then also took 2 of 3 from the Miami Marlins. The Phillies then split the series at 2–2 against the Milwaukee Brewers and Cincinnati Reds. After their game 4 win against the Reds, the Phillies moved up to third place in the division for the first time since April 12. The Phillies then pulled off a three-game sweep of the Nationals, marking their second three-game sweep of the season. The Phillies would however take just 1 of 3 from the New York Mets. To finish the month, the Phillies would pull off a comeback win against the Braves in game 1 on August 31. The Phillies ended up taking 2 of 3 from that series. They could have swept the series, but the Phillies blew a 7–3 lead in the bottom of the 9th inning in game 3. The Phillies finished August by going 17–12, their best month of the season overall so far. However, Carlos Ruiz, who had been the star of the Phillies with his remarkable performance this season, had to sit out for 4–6 weeks because of a fractured knee that took a beating throughout the month. Ruiz was replaced by Erik Kratz due to catcher Brian Schneider also suffering an injury. This month also saw a huge improvement by Kyle Kendrick. After Charlie Manuel got really disappointed in an awful outing by Kyle in a 12–6 loss when he allowed 6 runs, he has been the hottest Phillies's pitcher since. Right away in his next outing, he shut the Miami Marlins out, allowing no runs. He did the same in his next outing against a normally strong Milwaukee Brewers offense. Although in his next outing Kyle allowed a 2-run home run against the Washington Nationals, Kendrick received his 3rd win in a row when the Phillies won 4–2. Kendrick picked up his fourth win in a row when the Phillies won 3–2 against the New York Mets.

=== September/ October ===
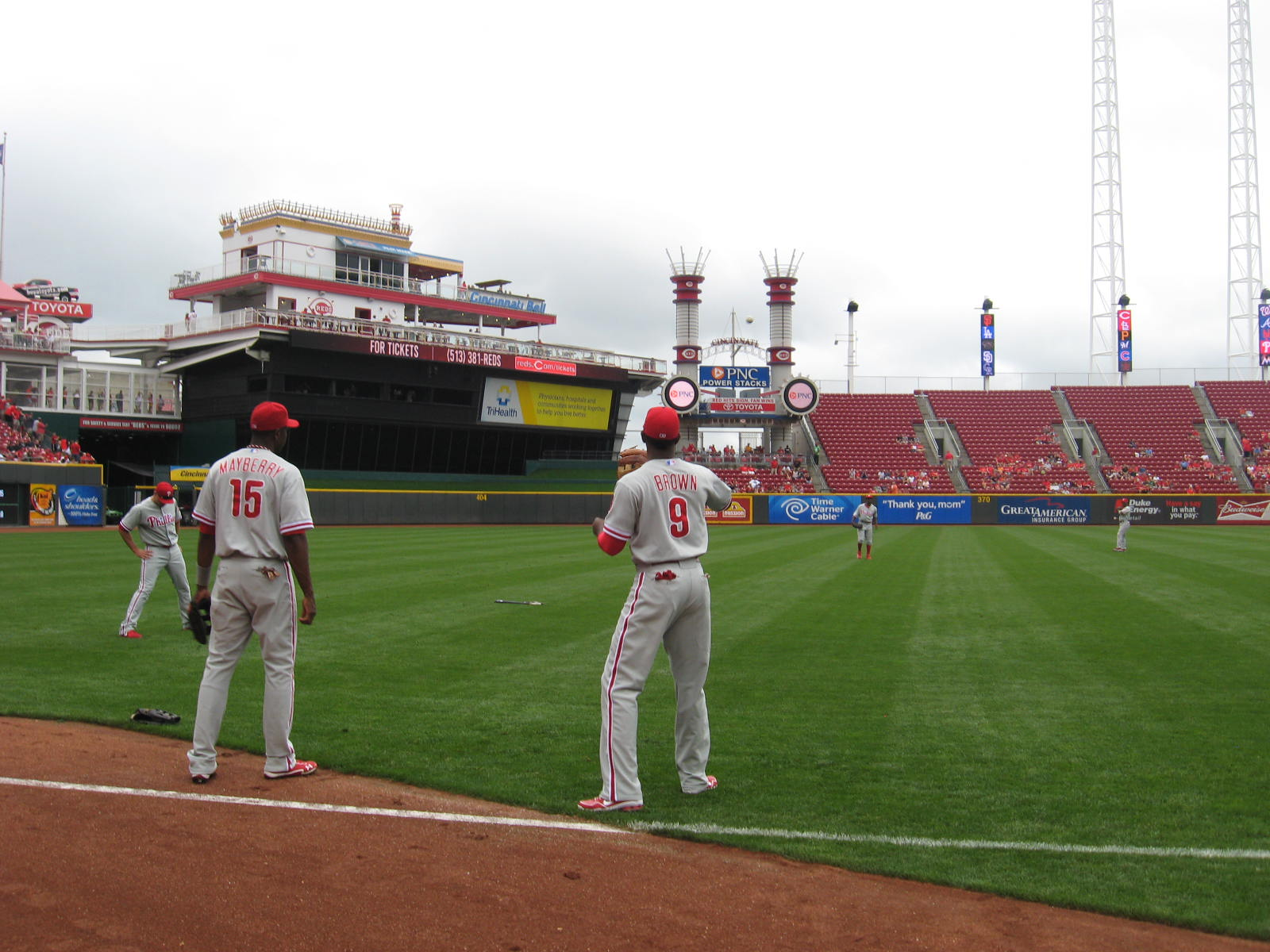
Some of the Phillies warming up for a Labor Day game against the Cincinnati Reds.

The Phillies were 64–70 and were 8 games behind the second Wild Card team St. Louis Cardinals after their series with the Braves on September 2. The Phillies will try to make an impressive late run to make the Wild Card. The Phillies started the month of September by taking 2 of 3 from the Cincinnati Reds. Then, the Phillies caught fire in the wild card standings, by sweeping both the Colorado Rockies and Miami Marlins in a 3-game series to climb back up above .500 for the first time since June 3, partly due to strong performances by Jimmy Rollins shortly after coming back after getting benched when he did not hustle after a pop-up on August 30. Meanwhile, the teams ahead of them struggled, with the Pittsburgh Pirates losing 6 in a row and the Cardinals and Los Angeles Dodgers losing 6 of their last 7 games. As a result, the Phillies were just 3 games behind the Cardinals on September 12. However, just as it seemed like the Phillies were going to make an improbable run to the playoffs, disaster stroke in the next series against the Houston Astros. Mainly due to bad pitching performances, the Phillies lost 3 of 4 to the last-place Astros and were 4 games back after the series. This was also when the Phillies were eliminated from winning the division with a 6–7 loss on September 16. However, the Phillies tried to rebound. They then had their revenge on the New York Mets for the tough losses they gave the Phils this season by sweeping them. This includes a come-from-behind 3–2 when Ryan Howard hit a 2-run home run when the Phillies were down to their final out and a huge blowout 16–1 win when the Phillies scored 8 runs on the road in the first inning for the first time since 1912. Despite the sweep, the Phillies were unable to pick up any games as the Cardinals started getting hot around this time. Then in the next series against the Atlanta Braves, although they would win the first game to climb back to 3 games behind the Cardinals, they would lose the final 2 games which sunk them to 5 1/2 games behind the Cardinals and majorly damaged their playoff hopes. However, in game 2 of the series, Ryan Howard hit his 300th career home run after 1,093 games, becoming the second fastest player to hit the 300th homer. The Phillies were unable to keep their now very slim playoff chances alive by taking just 1 of 3 from the Washington Nationals. However, Darin Ruf, who recently joined the Phillies from the minor leagues, saw that his first hit was also his first home run. Their playoff chances then ended for good when the Phillies loss the first game of the next series against the Marlins on September 28. The Phillies would then finish the year by winning the next 2 games against the Marlins, but would win only 1 of 3 from the Nationals. The Phillies would finish the year 81–81. Although it was impressive to recover from 14 games behind .500 in just half a season, this season was their first non-winning season since 2002. The Phillies already fired first base coach Sam Perlozzo, bench coach Pete Mackanin and hitting coach Greg Gross.

== Season standings ==
=== NL East standings ===
NL East
Team	W	L	Pct.	GB	Home	Road
Washington Nationals	98	64	.605	—	50‍–‍31	48‍–‍33
Atlanta Braves	94	68	.580	4	48‍–‍33	46‍–‍35
Philadelphia Phillies	81	81	.500	17	40‍–‍41	41‍–‍40
New York Mets	74	88	.457	24	36‍–‍45	38‍–‍43
Miami Marlins	69	93	.426	29	38‍–‍43	31‍–‍50

=== NL Wild Card ===
Division leaders
Team	W	L	Pct.
Washington Nationals	98	64	.605
Cincinnati Reds	97	65	.599
San Francisco Giants	94	68	.580

Wild Card teams (Top 2 teams qualify for postseason)
Team	W	L	Pct.	GB
Atlanta Braves	94	68	.580	+6
St. Louis Cardinals	88	74	.543	—
Los Angeles Dodgers	86	76	.531	2
Milwaukee Brewers	83	79	.512	5
Philadelphia Phillies	81	81	.500	7
Arizona Diamondbacks	81	81	.500	7
Pittsburgh Pirates	79	83	.488	9
San Diego Padres	76	86	.469	12
New York Mets	74	88	.457	14
Miami Marlins	69	93	.426	19
Colorado Rockies	64	98	.395	24
Chicago Cubs	61	101	.377	27
Houston Astros	55	107	.340	33

== Record vs. opponents ==
2012 National League record Source: MLB Standings Grid – 2012
Team	AZ	ATL	CHC	CIN	COL	MIA	HOU	LAD	MIL	NYM	PHI	PIT	SD	SF	STL	WSH	AL
Arizona	–	2–5	5–4	2–5	9–7	5–3	6–0	12–6	3–3	3–4	2–4	3–4	7–11	9–9	1–5	2–4	9–6
Atlanta	5–2	–	3–4	1–5	6–1	14–4	4–2	3–3	3–3	12–6	12–6	3–4	4–3	3–4	5–1	8–10	8–10
Chicago	4–5	4–3	–	4–12	2–4	8–5	2–4	2–4	4–13	4–2	2–4	8–8	3–3	1–6	7–10	1–6	5–10
Cincinnati	5–2	5–1	12–4	–	5–1	10–5	2–4	3–3	9–6	6–2	3–4	11–7	6–2	4–3	6–7	2–5	7–8
Colorado	7–9	1–6	4–2	1–5	–	5–2	5–2	8–10	5–1	5–2	2–7	2–4	8–10	4–14	2–5	4–3	2–13
Houston	0–6	2–4	5–8	5–10	2–5	–	2–4	2–4	8–9	4–2	3–3	5–12	3–5	1–8	4–11	1–7	6–9
Los Angeles	6–12	3–3	4–2	4–2	10–8	4–2	–	4–2	1–6	4–3	5–2	6–1	11–7	8–10	6–5	4–2	6–9
Miami	3–5	4–14	4–2	3–3	4–3	–	4–2	2–4	4–4	4–12	8–10	1–4	5–1	5–2	2–5	9–9	5–13
Milwaukee	3–3	3–3	13–4	6–9	1–5	9–8	6–1	4–4	–	3–2	2–5	11–4	3–4	2–4	6–9	3–5	6–9
New York	4–3	6–12	2–4	2–6	2–5	2–4	3–4	12–4	2–3	–	10–8	5–2	4–3	4–4	4–3	4–14	8–7
Philadelphia	4–2	6–12	4–2	4–3	7–2	10–8	3–3	2–5	5–2	8–10	–	3–4	4–3	2–4	5–2	9–9	5–10
Pittsburgh	4–3	2–3	8–8	7–11	4–2	4–1	12–5	1–6	4–11	2–5	4–3	–	1–5	3–3	8–7	3–2	10–8
San Diego	11–7	3–4	3–3	2–6	10–8	5–3	7–11	1–5	4–3	3–4	3–4	5–1	–	6–12	3–3	2–3	8–7
San Francisco	9–9	4–3	6–1	3–4	14–4	2–5	8–1	10–8	4–2	4–4	4–2	3–3	12–6	–	3–3	1–5	7–8
St. Louis	5–1	1–5	10–7	7–6	5–2	11–4	5–6	5–2	9–6	3–4	3–4	7–8	3–3	3–3	–	3–4	8–7
Washington	4–2	10–8	6–1	5–2	3–4	7–1	2–4	9–9	5–3	14–4	9–9	2–3	3–2	5–1	4–3	–	10–8

9-9

== Game log ==
Legend
	Phillies win
	Phillies loss
	Postponement
**Bold**	Phillies team member

2012 Game Log
April (11–12)

#	Date	Opponent	Score	Win	Loss	Save	Attendance	Record
1	April 5	@ Pirates	1–0	**Halladay** (1–0)	Bédard (0–1)	**Papelbon** (1)	39,585	1–0
2	April 7	@ Pirates	1–2 (10)	Cruz (1–0)	**Blanton** (0–1)		38,885	1–1
3	April 8	@ Pirates	4–5	Hanrahan (1–0)	**Herndon** (0–1)		19,856	1–2
4	April 9	Marlins	2–6	Sánchez (1–0)	**Hamels** (0–1)		45,574	1–3
5	April 11	Marlins	7–1	**Halladay** (2–0)	Johnson (0–2)		45,359	2–3
6	April 12	Marlins	3–1	**Blanton** (1–1)	Buehrle (0–2)	**Papelbon** (2)	44,751	3–3
7	April 13	Mets	2–5	Dickey (2–0)	**Lee** (0–1)		45,429	3–4
8	April 14	Mets	0–5	Niese (2–0)	**Worley** (0–1)		45,750	3–5
9	April 15	Mets	8–2	**Hamels** (1–1)	Ramírez (1–1)		45,829	4–5
10	April 16	@ Giants	5–2	**Halladay** (3–0)	Lincecum (0–2)	**Papelbon** (3)	41,136	5–5
11	April 17	@ Giants	2–4	Bumgarner (2–1)	**Blanton** (1–2)	Casilla (1)	41,101	5–6
12	April 18	@ Giants	0–1 (11)	Hensley (1–0)	**Bastardo** (0–1)		41,860	5–7
13	April 19	@ Padres	2–0	**Worley** (1–1)	Wieland (0–2)	**Papelbon** (4)	17,573	6–7
14	April 20	@ Padres	4–1	**Hamels** (2–1)	Vólquez (0–2)	**Papelbon** (5)	23,748	7–7
15	April 21	@ Padres	1–5	Luebke (2–1)	**Halladay** (3–1)		31,437	7–8
16	April 22	@ Padres	1–6	Bass (1–2)	**Blanton** (1–3)		26,759	7–9
17	April 23	@ Diamondbacks	5–9	Miley (2–0)	**Kendrick** (0–1)		21,195	7–10
18	April 24	@ Diamondbacks	8–5	**Worley** (2–1)	Collmenter (0–2)	**Papelbon** (6)	24,213	8–10
19	April 25	@ Diamondbacks	7–2	**Hamels** (3–1)	Cahill (1–2)		25,934	9–10
20	April 27	Cubs	1–5	Maholm (2–2)	**Halladay** (3–2)	Dolis (1)	45,261	9–11
21	April 28	Cubs	5–2	**Blanton** (2–3)	Wells (0–1)	**Papelbon** (7)	45,196	10–11
22	April 29	Cubs	1–5	Garza (2–1)	**Kendrick** (0–2)		45,550	10–12
23	April 30	Cubs	6–4	**Qualls** (1–0)	Maine (0–1)	**Papelbon** (8)	45,397	11–12

May (16–13)

#	Date	Opponent	Score	Win	Loss	Save	Attendance	Record
24	May 1	@ Braves	4–2	**Bastardo** (1–1)	Venters (2–1)	**Papelbon** (9)	21,640	12–12
25	May 2	@ Braves	13–15 (11)	Durbin (1–0)	**Sanches** (0–1)		26,504	12–13
26	May 3	@ Braves	4–0	**Blanton** (3–3)	Delgado (2–3)		24,015	13–13
27	May 4	@ Nationals	3–4 (11)	Perry (1–0)	**Schwimer** (0–1)		34,377	13–14
28	May 5	@ Nationals	1–7	Gonzalez (3–1)	**Worley** (2–2)		39,496	13–15
29	May 6	@ Nationals	9–3	**Hamels** (4–1)	Zimmermann (1–3)		33,058	14–15
30	May 7	Mets	2–5	Byrdak (1–0)	**Papelbon** (0–1)	Francisco (8)	44,365	14–16
31	May 8	Mets	4–7	Acosta (1–2)	**Qualls** (1–1)	Rauch (1)	43,821	14–17
32	May 9	Mets	6–10	Byrdak (2–0)	**Kendrick** (0–3)		43,840	14–18
33	May 11	Padres	7–3	**Worley** (3–2)	Richard (1–5)		44,056	15–18
34	May 12	Padres	1–2	Vólquez (2–2)	**Halladay** (3–3)	Thayer (3)	45,542	15–19
35	May 13	Padres	3–2	**Hamels** (5–1)	Suppan (2–1)	**Papelbon** (10)	45,442	16–19
36	May 14	Astros	5–1	**Blanton** (4–3)	Harrell (2–3)		43,824	17–19
37	May 15	Astros	4–3 (10)	**Diekman** (1–0)	Myers (0–1)		43,781	18–19
38	May 16	@ Cubs	9–2	**Contreras** (1–0)	Camp (2–2)		38,678	19–19
39	May 17	@ Cubs	8–7	**Halladay** (4–3)	Volstad (0–6)	**Papelbon** (11)	37,986	20–19
40	May 18	Red Sox	6–4	**Hamels** (6–1)	Bard (3–5)	**Papelbon** (12)	45,205	21–19
41	May 19	Red Sox	5–7	Lester (3–3)	**Blanton** (4–4)	Aceves (9)	45,656	21–20
42	May 20	Red Sox	1–5	Beckett (4–4)	**Lee** (0–2)		45,586	21–21
43	May 21	Nationals	1–2	Gonzalez (6–1)	**Kendrick** (0–4)	Burnett (2)	43,787	21–22
44	May 22	Nationals	2–5	Zimmermann (3–4)	**Halladay** (4–4)	Clippard (1)	45,569	21–23
45	May 23	Nationals	4–1	**Hamels** (7–1)	Jackson (1–2)		43,926	22–23
46	May 24	@ Cardinals	10–9	**Valdés** (1–0)	Salas (0–3)	**Papelbon** (13)	40,135	23–23
47	May 25	@ Cardinals	5–3 (10)	**Valdés** (2–0)	Motte (3–2)	**Papelbon** (14)	43,375	24–23
48	May 26	@ Cardinals	4–0	**Kendrick** (1–4)	García (3–3)		44,476	25–23
49	May 27	@ Cardinals	3–8	Wainwright (4–5)	**Halladay** (4–5)		42,659	25–24
50	May 28	@ Mets	8–4	**Hamels** (8–1)	Parnell (1–1)		32,122	26–24
51	May 29	@ Mets	3–6	Hefner (1–2)	**Blanton** (4–5)	Francisco (14)	25,487	26–25
52	May 30	@ Mets	10–6	**Bastardo** (2–1)	Rauch (3–4)		30,064	27–25

June (9–19)

#	Date	Opponent	Score	Win	Loss	Save	Attendance	Record
53	June 1	Marlins	6–4	**Kendrick** (2–4)	Buehrle (5–5)	**Papelbon** (15)	44,497	28–25
54	June 2	Marlins	4–5	Nolasco (6–3)	**Hamels** (8–2)	Bell (11)	45,509	28–26
55	June 3	Marlins	1–5	Zambrano (4–3)	**Blanton** (4–6)	Bell (12)	45,356	28–27
56	June 4	Dodgers	3–4	Belisario (1–0)	**Papelbon** (0–2)	Jansen (7)	45,572	28–28
57	June 5	Dodgers	1–2	Billingsley (3–4)	**Lee** (0–3)	Jansen (8)	43,989	28–29
58	June 6	Dodgers	5–6	Capuano (8–2)	**Kendrick** (2–5)	Jansen (9)	44,216	28–30
59	June 7	Dodgers	3–8	Harang (5–3)	**Hamels** (8–3)		44,096	28–31
60	June 8	@ Orioles	9–6	**Blanton** (5–6)	Arrieta (2–8)	**Papelbon** (16)	40,459	29–31
61	June 9	@ Orioles	4–6 (12)	Ayala (2–1)	**Rosenberg** (0–1)		46,611	29–32
62	June 10	@ Orioles	4–5 (10)	O'Day (4–0)	**Savery** (0–1)		45,267	29–33
63	June 12	@ Twins	7–11	Blackburn (3–4)	**Kendrick** (2–6)		32,622	29–34
64	June 13	@ Twins	9–8	**Hamels** (9–3)	Walters (2–2)	**Papelbon** (17)	32,581	30–34
65	June 14	@ Twins	6–1	**Blanton** (6–6)	Diamond (5–2)		32,205	31–34
66	June 15	@ Blue Jays	0–3	Villanueva (2–0)	**Worley** (3–3)	Janssen (6)	28,266	31–35
67	June 16	@ Blue Jays	5–6 (10)	Cordero (2–4)	**Savery** (0–2)		42,070	31–36
68	June 17	@ Blue Jays	2–6	Cecil (1–0)	**Kendrick** (2–7)		45,060	31–37
69	June 19	Rockies	7–2	**Hamels** (10–3)	Outman (0–3)		44,329	32–37
70	June 20	Rockies	7–6	**Papelbon** (1–2)	Betancourt (1–3)		43,729	33–37
71	June 21	Rockies	1–4	Roenicke (2–0)	**Worley** (3–4)	Betancourt (11)	43,805	33–38
–	June 22	Rays	Postponed (rain); Makeup: June 24					
72	June 23	Rays	7–6	**Papelbon** (2–2)	McGee (2–2)		44,878	34–38
73	June 24 (1)	Rays	2–3	Price (10–4)	**Bastardo** (2–2)	Rodney (21)	44,785	34–39
74	June 24 (2)	Rays	3–7	Gomes (2–2)	**Lee** (0–4)		44,088	34–40
75	June 25	Pirates	8–3	**Blanton** (7–6)	Karstens (0–2)		44,721	35–40
76	June 26	Pirates	5–4	**Worley** (4–4)	Bédard (4–8)	**Papelbon** (18)	45,096	36–40
77	June 27	Pirates	7–11	McDonald (7–3)	**Valdés** (2–1)		44,057	36–41
78	June 28	Pirates	4–5	Burnett (9–2)	**Kendrick** (2–8)	Hanrahan (20)	44,521	36–42
79	June 29	@ Marlins	2–6	Johnson (5–5)	**Lee** (0–5)		28,246	36–43
80	June 30	@ Marlins	2–3	Buehrle (7–8)	**Hamels** (10–4)	Bell (16)	31,311	36–44

July (10–13)

#	Date	Opponent	Score	Win	Loss	Save	Attendance	Record
81	July 1	@ Marlins	2–5	Nolasco (7–6)	**Blanton** (7–7)	Bell (17)	31,727	36–45
82	July 3	@ Mets	1–11	Niese (7–3)	**Worley** (4–5)		42,516	36–46
83	July 4	@ Mets	9–2	**Lee** (1–5)	Young (2–2)		28,687	37–46
84	July 5	@ Mets	5–6	Parnell (2–1)	**Papelbon** (2–3)		28,409	37–47
85	July 6	Braves	0–5	Hudson (7–4)	**Bastardo** (2–3)		44,441	37–48
86	July 7	Braves	3–6	Hanson (10–5)	**Blanton** (7–8)	Kimbrel (24)	44,797	37–49
87	July 8	Braves	3–4	Jurrjens (3–2)	**Valdés** (2–2)	Kimbrel (25)	43,881	37–50
–	July 10	**2012 Major League Baseball All-Star Game in Kansas City, Missouri**						
88	July 13	@ Rockies	2–6	Friedrich (5–6)	**Lee** (1–6)		33,346	37–51
89	July 14	@ Rockies	8–5	**Worley** (5–5)	Guthrie (3–9)	**Papelbon** (19)	35,151	38–51
90	July 15	@ Rockies	5–1	**Hamels** (11–4)	Pomeranz (1–4)		25,685	39–51
91	July 16	@ Dodgers	3–2	**Blanton** (8–8)	Eovaldi (1–6)	**Papelbon** (20)	32,238	40–51
92	July 17	@ Dodgers	3–2	**Kendrick** (3–8)	Belisario (3–1)	**Papelbon** (21)	53,498	41–51
93	July 18	@ Dodgers	3–5 (12)	Wright (4–2)	**Diekman** (1–1)		39,955	41–52
94	July 20	Giants	2–7	Lincecum (4–10)	**Worley** (5–6)		44,205	41–53
95	July 21	Giants	5–6 (10)	Romo (3–1)	**Papelbon** (2–4)	Casilla (24)	45,989	41–54
96	July 22	Giants	4–3 (12)	**Kendrick** (4–8)	Penny (0–1)		44,551	42–54
97	July 23	Brewers	7–6	**Savery** (1–2)	Rodríguez (2–5)		43,717	43–54
98	July 24	Brewers	7–6	**Schwimer** (1–1)	Loe (4–4)	**Papelbon** (22)	43,745	44–54
99	July 25	Brewers	7–6 (10)	**Schwimer** (2–1)	Rodríguez (2–6)		44,715	45–54
100	July 27	@ Braves	1–6	Sheets (3–0)	**Hamels** (11–5)		42,239	45–55
101	July 28	@ Braves	1–2	Minor (6–7)	**Blanton** (8–9)	Kimbrel (30)	39,886	45–56
102	July 29	@ Braves	2–6	Hudson (10–4)	**Halladay** (4–6)		23,726	45–57
103	July 31	@ Nationals	8–0	**Lee** (2–6)	Strasburg (11–5)		30,167	46–57

August (17–12)

#	Date	Opponent	Score	Win	Loss	Save	Attendance	Record
104	August 1	@ Nationals	3–2	**Worley** (6–6)	Jackson (6–7)	**Papelbon** (23)	23,777	47–57
105	August 2	@ Nationals	0–3	Detwiler (6–4)	**Hamels** (11–6)	Clippard (21)	28,825	47–58
106	August 3	Diamondbacks	2–4	Kennedy (10–8)	**Kendrick** (4–9)	Putz (20)	43,766	47–59
107	August 4	Diamondbacks	3–0	**Halladay** (5–6)	Saunders (5–8)	**Papelbon** (24)	43,762	48–59
108	August 5	Diamondbacks	5–4	**Papelbon** (3–4)	Collmenter (3–3)		43,741	49–59
109	August 6	Braves	1–6	Sheets (4–1)	**Worley** (6–7)		41,665	49–60
110	August 7	Braves	3–0	**Hamels** (12–6)	Minor (6–8)		42,660	50–60
111	August 8	Braves	6–12	Durbin (4–1)	**Bastardo** (2–4)		41,501	50–61
112	August 10	Cardinals	3–1	**Halladay** (6–6)	Browning (0–1)	**Papelbon** (25)	43,122	51–61
113	August 11	Cardinals	1–4	Westbrook (12–8)	**Lee** (2–7)	Motte (26)	44,233	51–62
114	August 12	Cardinals	8–7 (11)	**Horst** (1–0)	Browning (0–2)		42,877	52–62
115	August 13	@ Marlins	4–0	**Hamels** (13–6)	Eovaldi (3–8)		23,309	53–62
116	August 14	@ Marlins	1–0	**Kendrick** (5–9)	Johnson (7–9)	**Papelbon** (26)	23,879	54–62
117	August 15	@ Marlins	2–9	Buehrle (10–11)	**Halladay** (6–7)		22,450	54–63
118	August 16	@ Brewers	4–7	Hernández (4–1)	**Lindblom** (2–3)	Henderson (3)	30,117	54–64
119	August 17	@ Brewers	2–6	Gallardo (12–8)	**Worley** (6–8)		39,163	54–65
120	August 18	@ Brewers	4–3	**Hamels** (14–6)	Fiers (6–6)	**Papelbon** (27)	43,386	55–65
121	August 19	@ Brewers	8–0	**Kendrick** (6–9)	Wolf (3–10)		42,224	56–65
122	August 20	Reds	12–5	**Halladay** (7–7)	Leake (5–8)		44,341	57–65
123	August 21	Reds	4–5	Broxton (3–3)	**Papelbon** (3–5)	Chapman (30)	45,091	57–66
124	August 22	Reds	2–3	Arroyo (10–7)	**Worley** (6–9)	Chapman (31)	41,794	57–67
125	August 23	Reds	4–3 (11)	**Valdés** (3–2)	Simón (2–2)		41,972	58–67
126	August 24	Nationals	4–2	**Kendrick** (7–9)	Jackson (7–9)	**Papelbon** (28)	42,096	59–67
127	August 25	Nationals	4–2	**Halladay** (8–7)	Gonzalez (16–7)	**Papelbon** (29)	44,256	60–67
128	August 26	Nationals	4–1	**Lee** (3–7)	Zimmermann (9–8)	**Lindblom** (1)	44,653	61–67
129	August 28	Mets	5–9 (10)	Parnell (4–3)	**Rosenberg** (0–2)		41,227	61–68
130	August 29	Mets	2–3	Harvey (3–3)	**Cloyd** (0–1)	Francisco (22)	42,882	61–69
131	August 30	Mets	3–2	**Kendrick** (8–9)	Niese (10–8)	**Papelbon** (30)	43,141	62–69
132	August 31	@ Braves	8–5 (10)	**Lindblom** (3–3)	Martínez (5–4)	**Papelbon** (31)	31,203	63–69

September (17–10)

#	Date	Opponent	Score	Win	Loss	Save	Attendance	Record
133	September 1	@ Braves	5–1	**Lee** (4–7)	Hudson (13–5)		44,749	64–69
134	September 2	@ Braves	7–8	Moylan (1–0)	**Papelbon** (3–6)		36,394	64–70
135	September 3	@ Reds	4–2	**Cloyd** (1–1)	Cueto (17–7)	**Aumont** (1)	22,487	65–70
136	September 4	@ Reds	1–2	Latos (12–4)	**Kendrick** (8–10)	Chapman (35)	17,806	65–71
137	September 5	@ Reds	6–2	**Halladay** (9–7)	Leake (7–9)		19,267	66–71
138	September 7	Rockies	3–2	**Papelbon** (4–6)	Harris (1–1)		42,028	67–71
–	September 8	Rockies	Postponed (rain); Makeup: September 9					
139	September 9 (1)	Rockies	3–2	**Papelbon** (5–6)	Belisle (3–6)		41,813	68–71
140	September 9 (2)	Rockies	7–4	**Rosenberg** (1–2)	Roenicke (4–2)	**Papelbon** (32)	40,394	69–71
141	September 10	Marlins	3–1	**Kendrick** (9–10)	LeBlanc (2–4)	**Bastardo** (1)	41,505	70–71
142	September 11	Marlins	9–7	**Halladay** (10–7)	Eovaldi (4–12)	**Papelbon** (33)	42,028	71–71
143	September 12	Marlins	3–1	**Lee** (5–7)	Johnson (8–12)	**Papelbon** (34)	42,178	72–71
144	September 13	@ Astros	4–6	Wright (1–2)	**Aumont** (0–1)	López (5)	13,028	72–72
145	September 14	@ Astros	12–6	**Hamels** (15–6)	González (2–1)		17,535	73–72
146	September 15	@ Astros	0–5	Keuchel (2–7)	**Kendrick** (9–11)		20,419	73–73
147	September 16	@ Astros	6–7	Wright (2–2)	**Bastardo** (2–5)	López (6)	17,438	73–74
148	September 17	@ Mets	3–1	**Lee** (6–7)	Dickey (18–6)	**Papelbon** (35)	20,527	74–74
–	September 18	@ Mets	Postponed (rain); Makeup: September 20					
149	September 19	@ Mets	3–2	**Horst** (2–0)	Edgin (1–2)	**Papelbon** (36)	21,741	75–74
150	September 20	@ Mets	16–1	**Cloyd** (2–1)	Hefner (2–7)		20,010	76–74
151	September 21	Braves	6–2	**Kendrick** (10–11)	Hanson (12–9)		44,052	77–74
152	September 22	Braves	2–8	Minor (10–10)	**Halladay** (10–8)		45,377	77–75
153	September 23	Braves	1–2	Hudson (16–6)	**Lee** (6–8)	Kimbrel (39)	43,968	77–76
154	September 25	Nationals	6–3	**Hamels** (16–6)	Detwiler (10–7)	**Papelbon** (37)	42,304	78–76
155	September 26	Nationals	4–8	Lannan (4–0)	**Kendrick** (10–12)		41,440	78–77
156	September 27	Nationals	3–7	Gonzalez (21–8)	**Cloyd** (2–2)		44,070	78–78
157	September 28	@ Marlins	1–2	Cishek (5–2)	**Lindblom** (3–4)		28,201	78–79
158	September 29	@ Marlins	9–5	**Halladay** (11–8)	Nolasco (12–13)		30,202	79–79
159	September 30	@ Marlins	4–1	**Hamels** (17–6)	Eovaldi (4–13)	**Papelbon** (38)	28,317	80–79

October (1–2)

#	Date	Opponent	Score	Win	Loss	Save	Attendance	Record
160	October 1	@ Nationals	2–0	**Kendrick** (11–12)	Lannan (4–1)	**Aumont** (2)	35,387	81–79
161	October 2	@ Nationals	2–4	Duke (1–0)	**Lindblom** (3–5)	Storen (4)	33,546	81–80
162	October 3	@ Nationals	1–5	Jackson (10–11)	**Lee** (6–9)		37,075	81–81

== Roster ==
All players who made an appearance for the Phillies during 2012 are included.

†	Indicates players who started on Opening Day in 2012

2012 Philadelphia Phillies
Roster
Pitchers: 48 Phillippe Aumont; 37 Antonio Bastardo; 56 Joe Blanton; 59 Tyson Brummett; 50 Tyler Cloyd; 52 José Contreras; 79 Justin De Fratus; 63 Jake Diekman; 34 Roy Halladay ^{†}; 35 Cole Hamels; 57 David Herndon; 47 Jeremy Horst; 38 Kyle Kendrick; 33 Cliff Lee; 43 Josh Lindblom; 58 Jonathan Papelbon; 50 Chad Qualls; 53 B. J. Rosenberg; 48 Brian Sanches; 55 Joe Savery; 44 Michael Schwimer; 40 Michael Stutes; 46 Raúl Valdés; 49 Vance Worley	Catchers: 31 Erik Kratz; 39 Steven Lerud; 51 Carlos Ruiz ^{†}; 23 Brian Schneider; Infielders: 18 Mike Fontenot; 28 Kevin Frandsen; 13 Freddy Galvis ^{†}; 6 Ryan Howard; 29 Héctor Luna; 7 Michael Martínez; 4 Pete Orr; 27 Plácido Polanco ^{†}; 11 Jimmy Rollins ^{†}; 25 Jim Thome; 26 Chase Utley; 24 Ty Wigginton ^{†}	Outfielders: 9 Domonic Brown; 15 John Mayberry Jr. ^{†}; 19 Laynce Nix; 3 Hunter Pence ^{†}; 10 Juan Pierre; 16 Jason Pridie; 18 Darin Ruf; 22 Nate Schierholtz; 8 Shane Victorino ^{†}	Manager: 41 Charlie Manuel; Coaches: 17 Mick Billmeyer (bullpen); 30 Rich Dubee (pitching); 18 Greg Gross (hitting); 5 Pete Mackanin (bench); 2 Sam Perlozzo (1B); 12 Juan Samuel (3B); 81 Jesús Tiamo (bullpen catcher)

== Player stats ==
=== Batting ===
Note: G = Games played; AB = At bats; R = Runs; H = Hits; 2B = Doubles; 3B = Triples; HR = Home runs; RBI = Runs batted in; SB = Stolen bases; BB = Walks; AVG = Batting average; SLG = Slugging average

Player	G	AB	R	H	2B	3B	HR	RBI	SB	BB	AVG	SLG
Jimmy Rollins	156	632	102	158	33	5	23	68	30	62	.250	.427
John Mayberry Jr.	149	441	53	108	24	0	14	46	1	34	.245	.395
Hunter Pence	101	398	59	108	15	2	17	59	4	37	.271	.447
Juan Pierre	130	394	59	121	10	6	1	25	37	23	.307	.371
Shane Victorino	101	387	46	101	17	5	9	40	24	35	.261	.401
Carlos Ruiz	114	372	56	121	32	0	16	68	4	29	.325	.540
Ty Wigginton	125	315	40	74	11	0	11	43	1	37	.235	.375
Plácido Polanco	90	303	28	78	15	0	2	19	0	18	.257	.327
Chase Utley	83	301	48	77	15	2	11	45	11	43	.256	.429
Ryan Howard	71	260	28	57	11	0	14	56	0	25	.219	.423
Kevin Frandsen	55	195	24	66	10	3	2	14	0	9	.338	.451
Freddy Galvis	58	190	14	43	15	1	3	24	0	7	.226	363
Domonic Brown	56	187	21	44	11	2	5	26	0	21	.235	.396
Erik Kratz	50	141	14	35	9	0	9	26	0	11	.248	.504
Michael Martínez	45	115	10	20	3	0	2	7	0	5	.174	.252
Laynce Nix	70	114	13	28	10	0	3	16	0	12	.246	.412
Mike Fontenot	47	97	13	28	2	0	1	5	0	7	.289	.340
Brian Schneider	34	89	9	20	5	0	2	7	0	5	.225	.348
Nate Schierholtz	37	66	5	18	4	0	1	5	0	5	.273	.379
Jim Thome	30	62	9	15	2	0	5	15	0	8	.242	.516
Héctor Luna	28	62	5	14	2	0	2	10	0	4	.226	.355
Pete Orr	35	54	6	17	5	1	0	7	3	1	.315	.444
Darin Ruf	12	33	4	11	2	1	3	10	0	2	.333	.727
Jason Pridie	9	10	1	3	1	0	1	3	0	0	.300	.700
Steven Lerud	3	10	1	2	0	0	0	0	0	0	.200	.200
Pitcher totals	162	316	16	47	7	0	1	15	1	14	.149	.180
Team totals	162	5544	684	1414	271	28	158	659	116	454	.255	.400

=== Pitching ===
Note: W = Wins; L = Losses; ERA = Earned run average; G = Games pitched; GS = Games started; SV = Saves; IP = Innings pitched; H = Hits allowed; R = Runs allowed; ER = Earned runs allowed; BB = Walks allowed; SO = Strikeouts

Player	W	L	ERA	G	GS	SV	IP	H	R	ER	BB	SO
Cole Hamels	17	6	3.05	31	31	0	215.1	190	80	73	52	216
Cliff Lee	6	9	3.16	30	30	0	211.0	207	79	74	28	207
Kyle Kendrick	11	12	3.90	37	25	0	159.1	154	76	69	49	116
Roy Halladay	11	8	4.49	25	25	0	156.1	155	78	78	36	132
Joe Blanton	8	9	4.59	21	20	0	133.1	141	74	68	18	115
Vance Worley	6	9	4.20	23	23	0	133.0	154	69	62	47	107
Jonathan Papelbon	5	6	2.44	70	0	38	70.0	56	22	19	18	92
Antonio Bastardo	2	5	4.33	65	0	1	52.0	40	26	25	26	81
Michael Schwimer	2	1	4.46	35	0	0	34.1	30	18	17	16	36
Tyler Cloyd	2	2	4.91	6	6	0	33.0	33	18	18	7	30
Chad Qualls	1	1	4.60	35	0	0	31.1	39	18	16	9	19
Jeremy Horst	2	0	1.15	32	0	0	31.1	21	8	4	14	40
Raúl Valdés	3	2	2.90	27	1	0	31.0	18	10	10	5	35
Jake Diekman	1	1	3.95	32	0	0	27.1	25	17	12	20	35
Joe Savery	1	2	5.40	19	0	0	25.0	26	17	15	8	16
B.J. Rosenberg	1	2	6.12	22	1	0	25.0	18	17	17	14	24
Josh Lindblom	1	3	4.63	26	0	1	23.1	19	15	12	17	27
Phillipe Aumont	0	1	3.68	18	0	2	14.2	10	6	6	9	14
José Contreras	1	0	5.27	17	0	0	13.2	13	10	8	3	15
Justin De Fratus	0	0	3.38	13	0	0	10.2	7	5	4	5	8
David Herndon	0	1	4.70	5	0	0	7.2	10	4	4	1	8
Brian Sanches	0	1	9.95	6	0	0	6.1	12	7	7	3	5
Michael Stutes	0	0	6.35	6	0	0	5.2	7	6	4	4	5
Tyson Brummett	0	0	0.00	1	0	0	0.2	2	0	0	0	2
Team totals	81	81	3.83	162	162	42	1451.1	1387	680	618	409	1385

== Farm system ==
Level	Team	League	Manager
AAA	Lehigh Valley IronPigs	International League	Ryne Sandberg
AA	Reading Phillies	Eastern League	Dusty Wathan
A	Clearwater Threshers	Florida State League	Chris Truby
A	Lakewood BlueClaws	South Atlantic League	Mickey Morandini
A-Short Season	Williamsport Crosscutters	New York–Penn League	Andy Tracy
Rookie	GCL Phillies	Gulf Coast League	Roly de Armas
