= Mike Lieberthal =

American baseball player (born 1972)

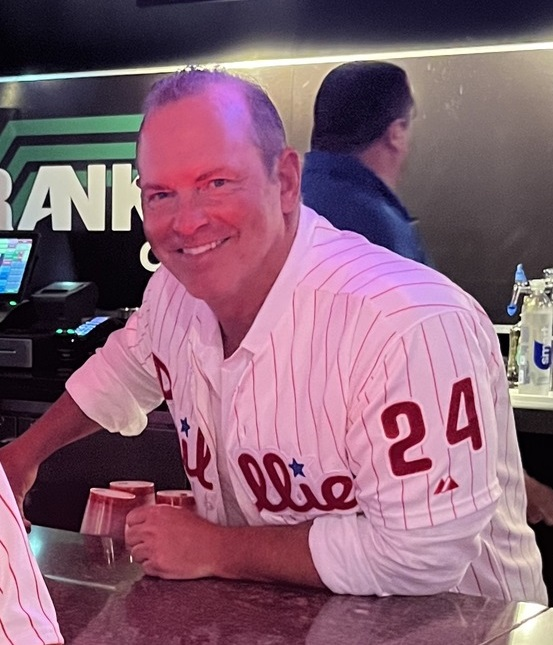
- Catcher
- Born: January 18, 1972 (age 54); Glendale, California, U.S.
- Batted: Right Threw: Right

MLB debut
- June 30, 1994, for the Philadelphia Phillies

Last MLB appearance
- September 22, 2007, for the Los Angeles Dodgers

MLB statistics
- Batting average: .274
- Home runs: 150
- Runs batted in: 610
- Stats at Baseball Reference

Teams
- Philadelphia Phillies (1994–2006); Los Angeles Dodgers (2007)

Career highlights and awards
- 2× All-Star (1999, 2000); Gold Glove Award (1999); Philadelphia Phillies Wall of Fame

Michael Scott Lieberthal (born January 18, 1972) is an American former Major League Baseball catcher. He batted and threw right-handed.

In a 14-year career, Lieberthal played for the Philadelphia Phillies (1994–2006) and the Los Angeles Dodgers (2007). He compiled a career batting average of .274, with 150 home runs and 610 runs batted in. During his career he won the Gold Glove Award, and was twice an All Star.

His 1999 season (.300, 31 home runs, 96 RBIs, Gold Glove Award) was arguably the best ever of any Phillies catcher, and Lieberthal caught more games in his career than any other Phillies catcher (1,139). His career 149 home runs at catcher were the most in team history. Lieberthal had a .310 batting average, a .381 on-base percentage, and .510 slugging percentage lifetime against left-handed pitching.

Lieberthal was inducted into the Philadelphia Phillies Wall of Fame on August 10, 2012.

== Early life ==
Lieberthal was born in Glendale, California, and is Jewish. His father is Dennis Lieberthal, who was a Major League Baseball scout for the Detroit Tigers and San Francisco Giants (among others, he signed Gabe Kapler).

== High school and draft ==
He was an All-American catcher at Westlake High School, and graduated in 1990. Lieberthal hit four home runs in a single game for his high school: (1) a solo home run, (2) a 2-run home run, (3) a 3-run home run, and (4) a grand slam, though not in that order. Immediately after that game, Lieberthal's team was ranked among the top 3 high school teams in the United States by USA Today, and advanced on that list to #1 a few days later. While at the high school, Lieberthal set career records for at runs (79), hits (105), and home runs (30).

Lieberthal was drafted at 17 years of age by the Philadelphia Phillies in the 1st round (3rd overall) of the 1990 Major League Baseball draft, despite weighing only 155 pounds at the time.

== Career ==
=== Minor leagues ===
Lieberthal played in the minor leagues from 1990–1995. He played for Martinsville in 1990 (Rookie League), Spartanburg ("A"; for which he batted .305) and Clearwater ("A+") in 1991, Reading in 1992 ("AA"), and Scranton/Wilkes-Barre from 1992 to 1995 ("AAA").

=== Philadelphia Phillies (1994–2006) ===
He made his major league debut on June 30, 1994, at the age of 22 as the starting catcher against the Los Angeles Dodgers. Lieberthal recorded his first career base hit in the 4th inning against Pedro Astacio. On July 16, 1994 he hit his first home run off of Ramon Martinez in the 3rd inning of a 10–6 Phillies victory against the Dodgers.

In 1996, he had surgery for torn cartilage in his left knee. In June 1997, Lieberthal won Player of the Month award after batting .400, but his season was shortened by a pelvic stress fracture injury. In 1996, Lieberthal threw out 36% of runners attempting to steal. In 1997 he allowed only .64 steals per 9 innings, 3rd-best in the league. In 1999, Lieberthal led National League receivers with a .997 fielding percentage. Lieberthal caught Kevin Millwood's no-hitter on April 27, 2003.

In 1999, Lieberthal hit 31 home runs and 96 RBIs for the Phillies, while hitting .300 with a career-best .551 slugging percentage. He was an All Star for the first time, only the third Phillie catcher ever to receive the honor (joining Darren Daulton and Bob Boone). He also won a Gold Glove Award, after posting a .997 fielding percentage—a new Phillie record at catcher. He joined Johnny Bench, Lance Parrish, and Iván Rodríguez as the only catchers to have hit 30 home runs in the same season that they won the Gold Glove Award. He also became the eighth major league catcher to bat .300 and hit 30 homers in the same season. He also became the first Phillie to bat .300 and hit 30 home runs since Greg Luzinski, in 1977.

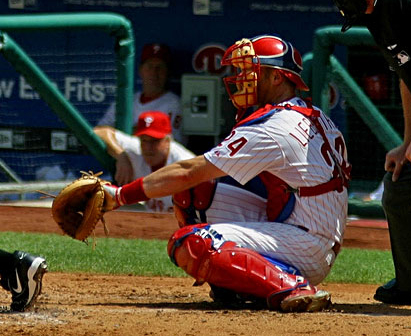
Mike Lieberthal catching for the Philadelphia Phillies during a game on August 28, 2006.

In 2000, Lieberthal was again an All-Star. A play at the plate involving a collision with Bernie Williams resulted in an ankle injury that knocked him out for the rest of the season. In September 2000, he had surgery to remove a bone spur in his right elbow.

In May 2001, Lieberthal was picked off at first base and tore his ACL and MCL and cartilage in his knee while attempting to dive back to the bag. He had surgery in June, and missed the rest of the season. In October 2002, he injured the same knee as he stepped out of a golf cart near his home. He tore the meniscus, and had surgery.

In 2002, he was selected the Sporting News NL Comeback Player of the Year, the first catcher to win it, and also was a co-winner of the Player's Choice NL Comeback Player award.

Lieberthal never reached the playoffs while with the Phillies, being promoted to the majors the year after their World Series loss to Toronto, and leaving via free agency before their return to the postseason in 2007.

=== Los Angeles Dodgers (2007) ===
Lieberthal signed as a free agent with the Los Angeles Dodgers on December 6, 2006. He received a $1.15 million contract, with a club option for 2008. He made more money than the Dodgers' starting catcher, All-Star Russell Martin.

After playing in only 38 games in 2007 and hitting .234, Lieberthal's $1.4 million option was not picked up by the Dodgers, who instead bought out the contract for $100,000, and he became a free agent on October 30, 2007.

In January 2008, Lieberthal announced his retirement. "I'm done," Lieberthal said. "If [the Dodgers] had picked up my option, I probably would have played 1 more year. But I didn't want to go anywhere else. There were a lot of reasons. The money was great as a backup, but I have made [enough] money in baseball. I just didn't want to go through what I have to go through with my body to play 20–25 games a year. It's not worth it."

It was suggested that while it was unlikely that Lieberthal would choose to coach, enjoying golf and married life for the immediate future, he had expressed an interest in being a television analyst.

=== Retirement ===
On April 28, 2008, Lieberthal announced that he would sign a one-day contract with the Phillies on June 1, throw out the ceremonial first pitch and then officially retire. He would be the first Phillies player to retire in the same manner since Doug Glanville in 2005.

== Personal life ==
Through 2010, Lieberthal had hit the 5th-most career home runs of any Jewish major league baseball player, behind Hank Greenberg, Shawn Green, Sid Gordon, and Al Rosen, and was 7th on the all-time list in hits (behind Gordon) and RBIs (behind Rosen). Lieberthal's father is Jewish, and he is considered Jewish by Reform Judaism, and is also listed as such by the American Jewish Historical Society and others. The next Jewish player for the Phillies was Michael Schwimer, who debuted in 2011.

When it was pointed out to Lieberthal that he, Brad Ausmus, and Jesse Levis, were all catchers, and that Jewish kids were thought to be smarter than to subject themselves to the rigors of that position, he responded with a smile: "We are smart. You don't have to hit to catch. We don't have to hit 40 homers. We don't have to run. We don't have to steal bases. All you have to do is catch, and you'll be in this league forever. We get beat up a little bit, but it's the quickest way to the major leagues."

Lieberthal was inducted into the So Cal Jewish Sports Hall of Fame in 2015, and into the International Jewish Sports Hall of Fame in 2016.

=== Film and television appearances ===
Lieberthal appeared in the motion picture Summer Catch in 2001 alongside teammates Doug Glanville and Pat Burrell, as well as fellow major league baseball stars Hank Aaron, Ken Griffey Jr., and Dave Collins, among others.

A bobblehead of Lieberthal is a regularly shown, but never explained, background prop in The Office. Its inclusion may be a joke based on the name of the character Michael Scott, which is the same as Lieberthal’s first and middle names. Another reason for its inclusion may be Lieberthal's time spent playing for the Scranton/Wilkes-Barre Red Barons, since the show takes place in Scranton.

=== Charitable fundraising ===
In 1998, he sponsored "Lieby's VIPs", in which he purchased $30,000 worth of tickets for children with cancer, and their families. He also treated the children to a Halloween party. He served as the 2000 chairman of the Corporate Alliance for Drug Education fundraising drive.

With Doug Glanville and Randy Wolf, Lieberthal co-hosts a celebrity billiards tournament on behalf of the Philadelphia Futures mentor program.

== See also ==
- List of Jewish Major League Baseball players
