= Kyle Kendrick =

American baseball player (born 1984)

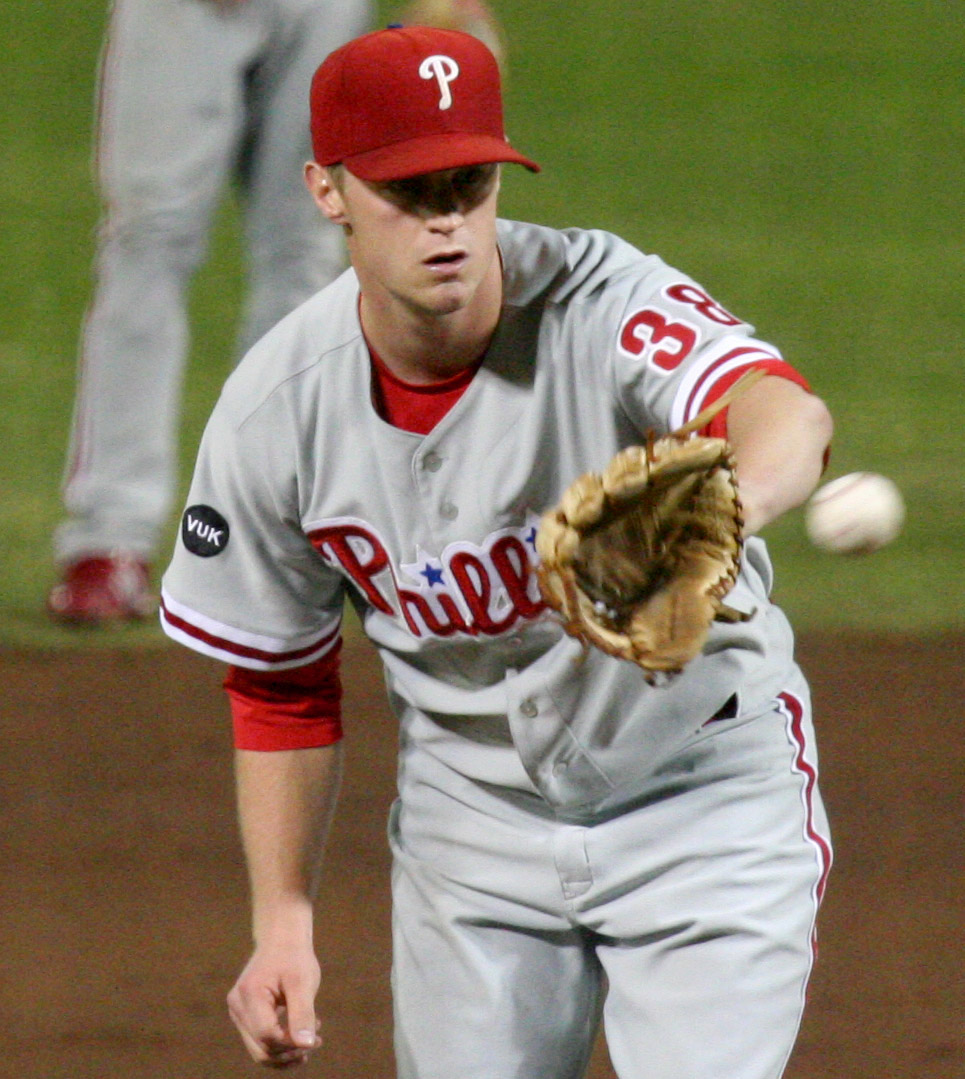
- Kendrick with the Philadelphia Phillies in 2007
- Pitcher
- Born: August 26, 1984 (age 42); Houston, Texas, U.S.
- Batted: Right Threw: Right

MLB debut
- June 13, 2007, for the Philadelphia Phillies

Last MLB appearance
- May 10, 2017, for the Boston Red Sox

MLB statistics
- Win–loss record: 81–83
- Earned run average: 4.68
- Strikeouts: 705
- Stats at Baseball Reference

Teams
- Philadelphia Phillies (2007–2014); Colorado Rockies (2015); Boston Red Sox (2017)

Kyle Rodney Kendrick (born August 26, 1984) is an American former professional baseball pitcher who played for the Philadelphia Phillies, Colorado Rockies, and Boston Red Sox of Major League Baseball (MLB).

Kendrick was born in Houston, Texas but attended high school in Mount Vernon, Washington. While growing up, he was greatly influenced by his father, from whom he developed his composure when pitching. Upon graduation, Kendrick turned down a scholarship to play college football, instead signing a contract to begin his pro baseball career with the Phillies. After a slow ascent through Minor League Baseball (MiLB), he made his MLB debut in 2007, and was a member of the starting rotation of the 2008 World Series Championship team.

Subsequently, Kendrick was demoted to the minors to develop secondary pitches. From 2010 to 2012, his role on the big-league squad frequently fluctuated; however, he was considered by many writers to be an underrated pitcher. Nevertheless, Kendrick drew the ire of Phillies fans who were tired of his inconsistency. After a successful 2012 campaign, he firmly implanted himself in the Phillies' starting rotation before the 2013 season.

He predominantly threw a sinker, mixed in with some secondary pitches.

== Early life ==
Born in Houston, Texas, Kendrick was a three-sport standout in football, basketball, and baseball at Mount Vernon High School in Mount Vernon, Washington. Throughout his adolescent athletic career, it was Kendrick's father Maury from whom Kendrick drew guidance and direction, particularly on how to conduct oneself during a game. Maury advised Kendrick to show as little emotion as possible when pitching, and is the one from whom Kendrick draws his composure while pitching. Kendrick and his father discuss pitching before and after every one of Kendrick's starts, which Maury watches from Seattle, Washington, and in 2013, Maury was part of the Phillies' Father's Day celebration, a celebration of his guidance of Kendrick.

== Professional career ==
=== Philadelphia Phillies ===
==== Minor leagues: 2003–2006 ====
The Philadelphia Phillies drafted Kendrick in the seventh round (205th overall) of the 2003 Major League Baseball draft, which caused him to reject a football scholarship offer to Washington State University. Kendrick began his career in the lower levels of the minor league system, and struggled mightily. A feature article in Phillies magazine noted,

His first three seasons, in the Gulf Coast League, and various Class A stops, weren't encouraging. He was a combined 10–28 with a 5.27 ERA (earned run average). He allowed 356 hits in 286.2 innings. There were some steps forward, some steps back

— Excerpt from Special K, by Paul Hagen in Phillies, June 2013

Early in Kendrick's career, many within the organization questioned his work ethic and maturity, which they thought may have contributed to his underachievement. In 2006, however, the Phillies "patience was ... rewarded"; pitching for the Lakewood BlueClaws for the third consecutive season, he earned Phillies Minor League Pitcher of the Month accolades for May, thus warranting a promotion to the Clearwater Threshers. In 20 starts with Clearwater, Kendrick posted a 3.53 ERA, among the best in the Florida State League. This performance as well as the fact that he spent significant time working out and focusing on mechanical improvement allayed the previous fears of poor work ethic. Ultimately, 2007 would be Kendrick's last in the low levels of the Phillies' minor leagues, as he began the season with the Double-A (AA) Reading Phillies, and finished it with the big league club.

==== Breaking through: 2007–2009 ====
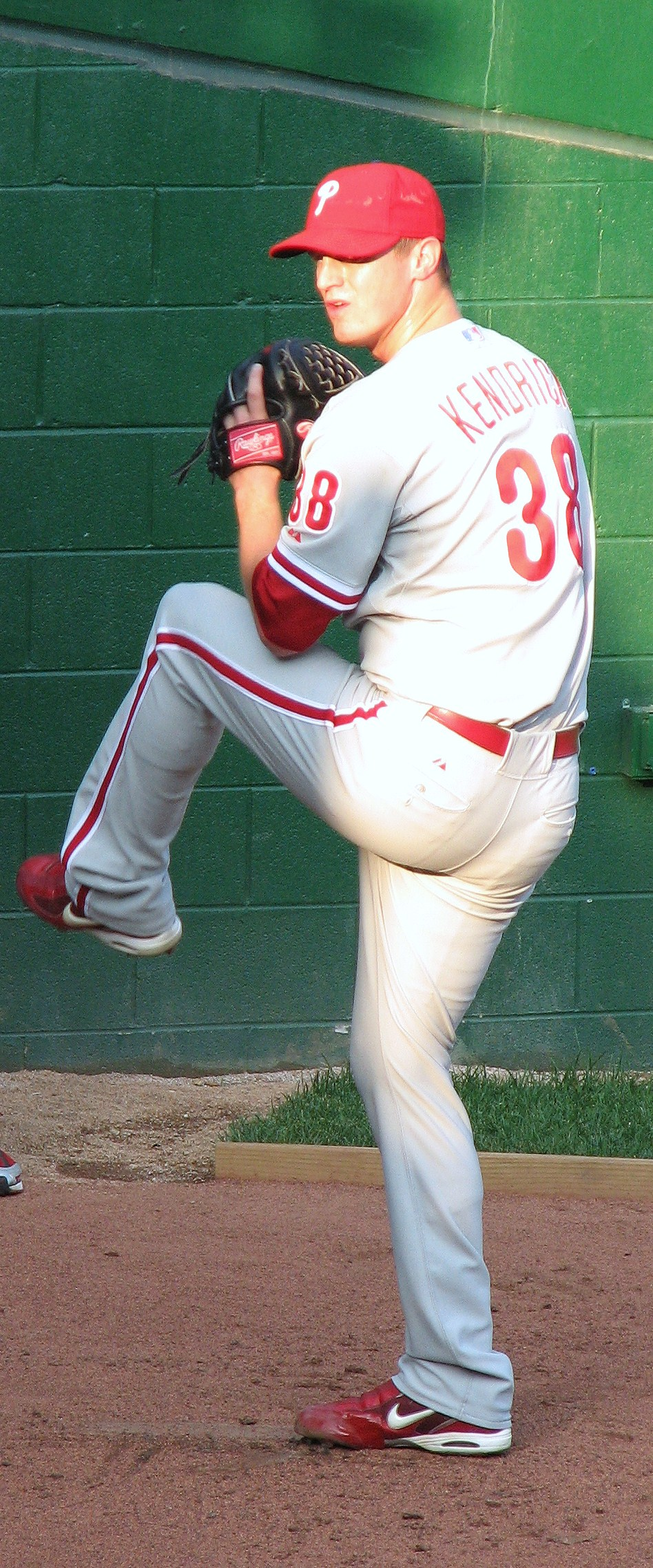
Kendrick during the 2008 regular season

Despite several options at Triple-A (AAA), when Freddy García got hurt, Pat Gillick promoted Kendrick to the major leagues, which drew skepticism, as Kendrick was just 22 years old, and had not pitched particularly well for Reading. However, according to Steve Noworyta, Phillies assistant director of player development, Kendrick's "mound presence and his maturity", as well as the fact that "nothing really seemed to bother him" contributed to his promotion. His MLB debut came on June 13 against the Chicago White Sox at Citizens Bank Park. He pitched six innings and gave up three runs, receiving a no-decision in an 8–4 Phillies' victory. He pitched the second game of the 2007 National League Division Series against the Colorado Rockies, which the Phillies lost, en route to being swept in the series. He finished the season with a 10–4 win–loss record and a 3.87 ERA in 121 MLB innings pitched. He came in fifth place, ultimately losing to Ryan Braun, in 2007 National League Rookie of the Year Award voting.

Before the 2008 season, Kendrick was a victim of an "elaborate practical joke" executed by Brett Myers that had Kendrick convinced he had been traded away to Japan. During the season, Kendrick's performance slipped; he posted a 5.49 ERA in 30 starts. Due to his relative ineffectiveness Kendrick was left off the postseason roster; the Phillies won the 2008 World Series and he received a World Series ring and co-authored a diary from the series. Phillies pitching coach Rich Dubee attributed the decline to hitters discerning that Kendrick threw predominantly a sinker, and almost always in the strike zone, thus fostering predictability for hitters.

As such, Kendrick spent the majority of the 2009 season in the minor leagues, working on developing his change up, which proved to be an arduous process. Ultimately, after learning a new grip from Justin Lehr, he had a eureka moment during a bullpen session in 2009; he developed the pitch, and made it back to the major leagues "for good" near the conclusion of the season.

==== An undefined role: 2010–2012 ====
The Phillies acquired Roy Halladay prior to the 2010 season, and during spring training, Kendrick sought the mentorship of Halladay, whom he aspired to emulate during his high school career. Halladay willingly obliged, and teammates endearingly referred to Kendrick as "Little Roy" due to the amount of time he spent working with Halladay. Despite initially losing a competition for the fifth spot in the Phillies starting rotation during spring training to Jamie Moyer, an injury to Joe Blanton thrust Kendrick into the fifth spot in the Phillies rotation, the fourth consecutive year during which he had held that role for at least a short time. After a decent first half of the 2010 season (at the end of June, he had a 4–4 record with a 3.23 ERA). Kendrick was briefly demoted to the Lehigh Valley IronPigs (AAA), but did not make any starts there, as Moyer's season ended due to injury, causing Kendrick's recall. Overall, he earned 11 wins, which tied a career high, and started 31 games, which set a new career high, while, in total, posting an 11–10 record with a 4.73 ERA in 180 2/3 innings pitched. Pat Gallen, editor in chief of Phillies Nation, opined that Kendrick's performance indicated he would never exceed being an average, "run-of-the-mill starting pitcher", who would never exceed that role. At the conclusion of the season, Kendrick and the Phillies avoided salary arbitration by agreeing to a one-year, US$2,450,000 contract.

Kendrick's inconsistency continued in 2011, when he "flip-flopped between the rotation and the bullpen all season", performing as a spot starter and long reliever. His starts came during injuries to Blanton and Roy Oswalt, the latter of whom was a member of the "phour aces" that comprised the front-end of the Phillies' starting rotation (Oswalt, Cliff Lee, Roy Halladay, and Cole Hamels). When making those spot starts, he was able to "keep the team in the game". During the season, he improved against left-handed hitters, performed strongly against divisional opponents, and posted a career-best 3.22 ERA. Overall, he totaled 34 appearances, 15 of which were starts, and recorded an 8–6 record in 114 2/3 innings pitched. Again eligible for arbitration, this year, he signed a one-year, US$3,585,000 pact with Philadelphia.

"Kyle Kendrick is perhaps the most underrated player on the Phillies roster. You’ve heard the narrative surrounding him: year in and year out, he fills multiple roles for the pitching staff, usually doing a satisfactory job, and some nights doing a fantastic job, yet he still is the target of fan vitriol."

— Phillies Player Review: Kyle Kendrick, by Ryan Dinger, Phillies Nation, October 27, 2012

Once again, Kendrick was not a member of the opening day starting rotation, as Blanton and Vance Worley rounded out the final two spots after Hamels, Halladay, and Lee. However, once again, he joined the rotation due to injury, this season to Worley. He was a member of the rotation from the end of April to the beginning of July, in a relief role until the beginning of August, and then in the rotation for the remainder of the season. Ultimately, Kendrick started 25 games of a career-high 37 appearances. He was especially strong after the all-star game, posting a 3.15 ERA and nine wins, the latter of which was tied for first in the National League. He also continued his success against NL East teams, posting a 3.25 ERA against them. Though he had much success, he remained inconsistent, playing "the role Dr. Jekyll and Mr. Hyde personified" – in 17 of his starts, he allowed two or fewer earned runs, and posted a combined 1.73 ERA in those starts, while in the eight starts during which he surrendered more than two earned runs, he posted a 10.40 ERA.

==== Middle-of-the-rotation starter: 2013–14 ====
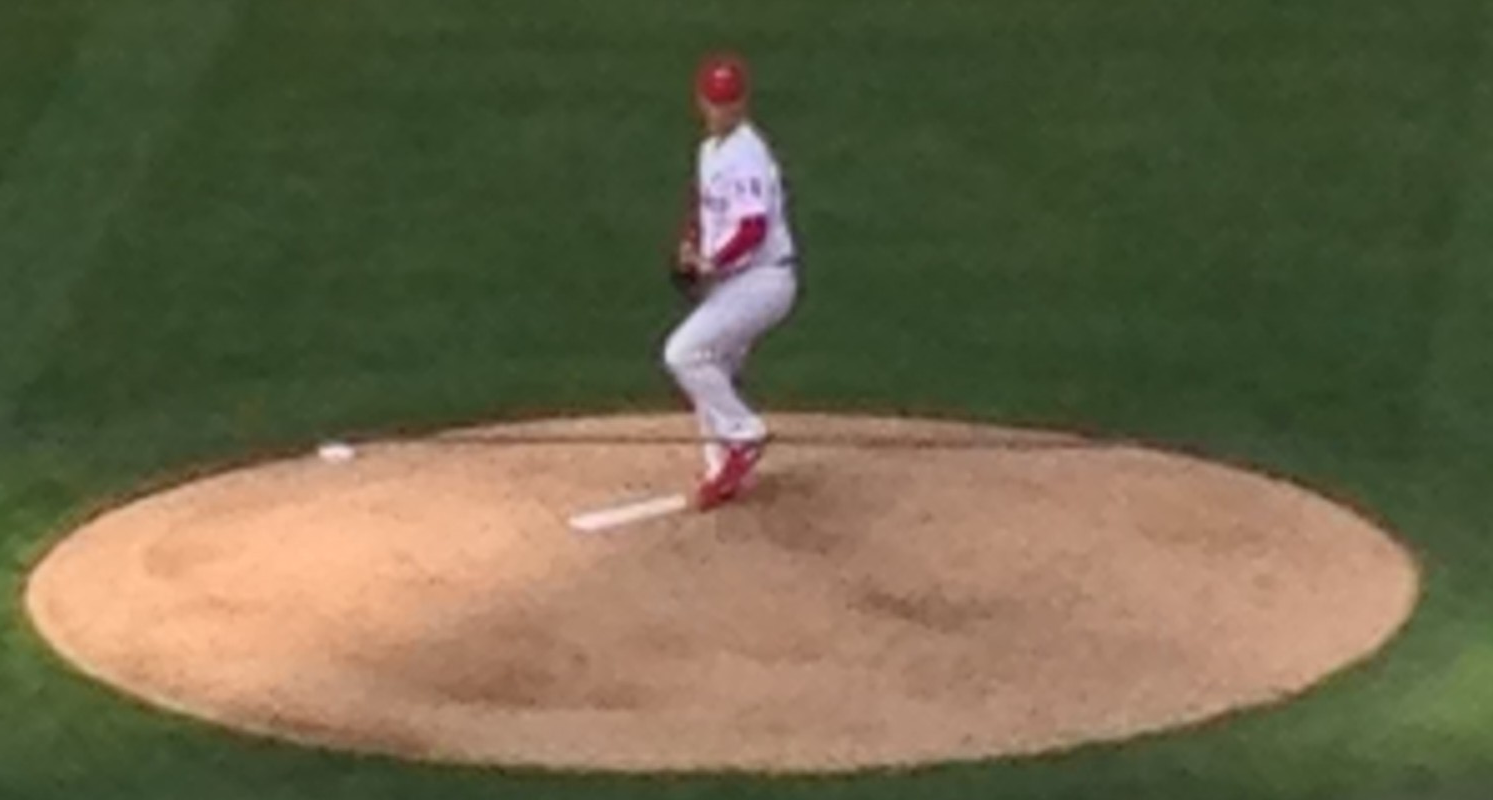
Kendrick pitching in a game against the Milwaukee Brewers on April 8, 2014

Thanks to his strong finish in 2012, Kendrick entered spring training assured of a spot in the Phillies' Opening Day starting rotation for the first time in five years and spent his first full season exclusively a member of the major league starting rotation. His 2013 season took the opposite trajectory of his 2012 campaign; he held a 4–1 record with a 2.47 ERA in his first eight starts, while he posted a 6–12 record with a 5.65 ERA in his final 22 starts. Some suggested that because Kendrick is a contact pitcher (i.e., he focuses on getting outs via batters hitting the ball rather than striking out), his career-worst batting average on balls in play indicated horrendous defense was the primary reason for his downturn, not necessarily poor pitching. However, both were likely contributing factors. On September 18, he was scratched from his scheduled start due to right rotator cuff tendinitis, which may have contributed to his poor pitching down the stretch. It was the first time in Kendrick's career he missed a start due to injury. He had initially planned on making his next start, but the Phillies announced on September 20 that Kendrick had been shut down for the remainder of the season after receiving a second opinion on the injury. The team placed him on the disabled list for his first career stint and Zach Miner took his spot in the rotation. Overall, he posted 10–13 with a 4.70 ERA in 182 innings pitched.

At the conclusion of the 2013 season, there was suggestion that the Phillies should re-sign Kendrick insofar as he would serve as a useful player to trade around the trade deadline for a prospect or two, as durable, mediocre starters are always in demand around that time. Contradictorily, one scout suggested that because he throws strikes with great frequency and has a propensity to induce groundballs, he would be a strong value option for the Phillies. Ultimately, the Phillies agreed with the latter, and signed him to a one-year, US$7,675,000 contract in the final year before he is eligible to be a free agent. Kendrick preposterously struggled all season in the first inning, entering his final home start of the season with a 9.31 ERA in the first inning. Overall, he pitched a career-high 199 innings, but posted a 4.61 ERA, second-worst among qualifying NL starting pitchers. The prevailing consensus was that despite a sentimental attachment to Philadelphia, generally being liked by Phillies' fans, and solid contributions to the back of the Phillies' rotation since arriving in the major leagues, he was unlikely to return to Philadelphia for 2015, but would be a "smart pickup" by a contending team.

=== Colorado Rockies ===
On February 4, 2015, Kendrick signed a one-year deal with the Colorado Rockies. He was later named the Rockies' opening-day starter for the 2015 season. For the season, he was 7–13 with a 6.32 ERA, and shared the major league lead in home runs given up with 33. He became a free agent following the season.

=== Los Angeles Angels of Anaheim ===
On December 31, 2015, Kendrick signed a minor league contract with the Atlanta Braves. In addition, Kendrick received a non-roster invite to spring training. He was released on March 12, 2016. He subsequently signed with the Los Angeles Angels of Anaheim, and spent the 2016 season with the Salt Lake Bees of the Triple–A Pacific Coast League, posting a 6–5 record and 4.73 ERA with 67 strikeouts over 16 games (15 starts). Kendrick elected free agency after the season on November 7.

=== Boston Red Sox ===
On January 18, 2017, Kendrick signed a minor league contract with the Boston Red Sox. He received a non-roster invite to spring training, and was later placed on the Major League roster. Kendrick started two games for the Red Sox in May, accruing a 0–2 record and 12.96 ERA. The 2017 season also saw him starting 18 games for the Triple-A Pawtucket Red Sox. Kendrick was outrighted on June 22, and elected free agency on October 2.

Kendrick elected retirement but after sitting out the 2018 season, he became a guest instructor at Phillies’ 2019 Spring Training.

== Pitching style ==
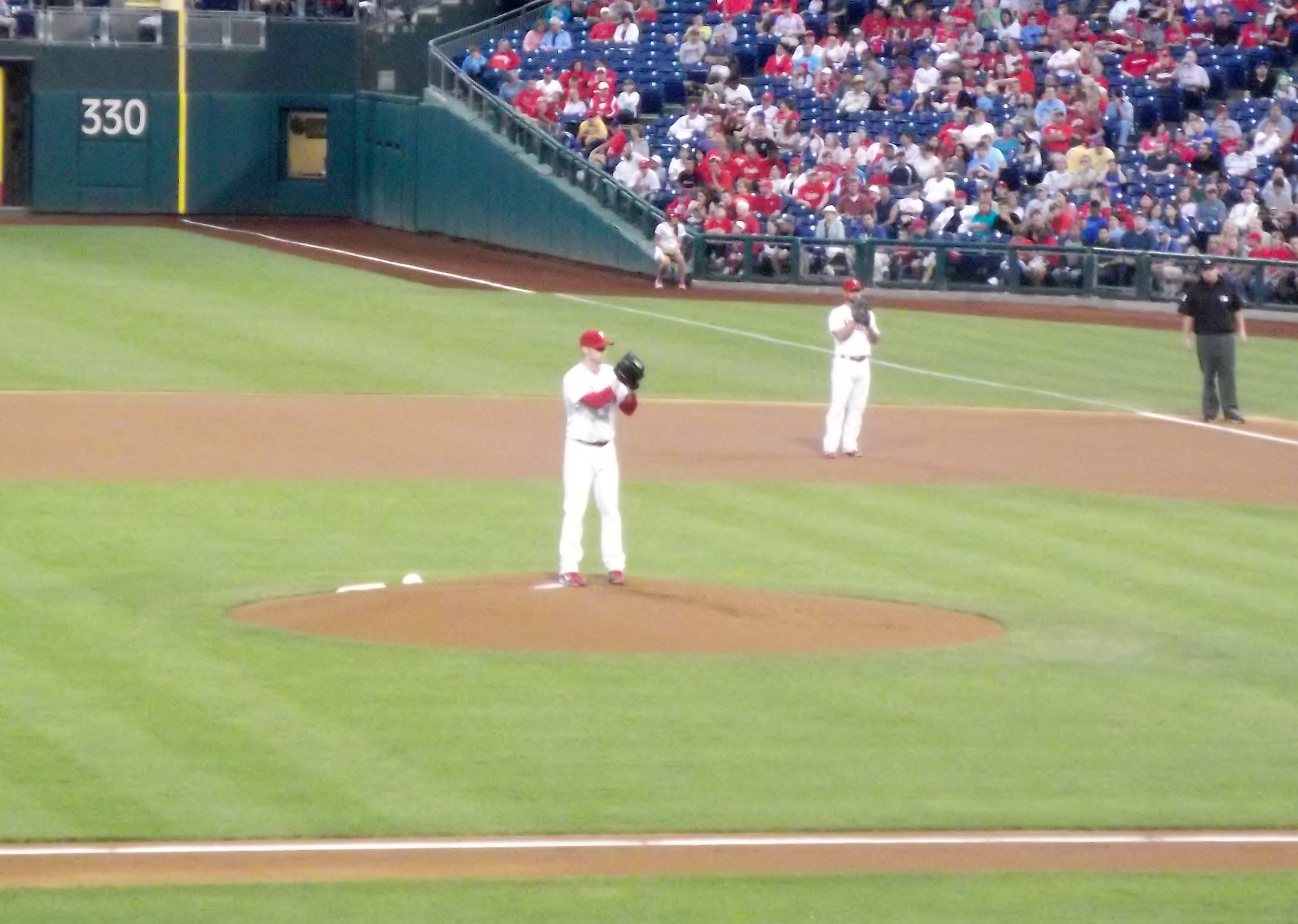
Kendrick pitches from a deliberate, slightly deceptive delivery; here he is in a game in September 2013.

When Kendrick was first promoted to the major leagues, he relied almost exclusively on a sinker, but as he became more predictable, he had to adjust by adding pitches, including the changeup, cutter, and curveball that now comprise his repertoire. He throws from a slightly deceptive, deliberate windup, and his sinker ranges anywhere from 87 miles per hour (140 km/h) to 93 miles per hour (150 km/h). He lacks requisite confidence in his secondary pitches, however, which contributes to batters being able to consistently make solid contact against him.

Although they have improved throughout his career, Kendrick has had poor peripheral statistics, including WAR, FIP and BABIP. Because he manages to stay competitive on the mound and do his job, most assert that the poor peripheral statistics do not matter for him. When pitching, he maintains constant equanimity and seeks to avoid showing emotion, a trait he learned from his father and has embodied since playing Little League Baseball. He credits his composure as the reason he is able to consistently "go with the flow", and avoid being flustered, even in adverse situations.

== Personal life ==
In 2009, Kendrick became engaged to four-time Survivor contestant Stephenie LaGrossa. They were married at the Silverado Resort in Napa, California, on November 13, 2010. Kendrick and LaGrossa had their first child, a daughter named Sophia Marguerite on September 3, 2011, and their second child, a son named Kyle Jr., on July 30, 2013.

In March 2011, Kendrick's home was burglarized; among the stolen items was his World Series ring. Subsequently, the ring was found in a swampy area of Bothell, Washington, by Snohomish County Sheriff's deputies.

Kendrick's pitching intro music is "Radioactive" by Imagine Dragons. Among his hobbies are golf and fantasy football.
