= Michael Schwimer =

American baseball player (born 1986)

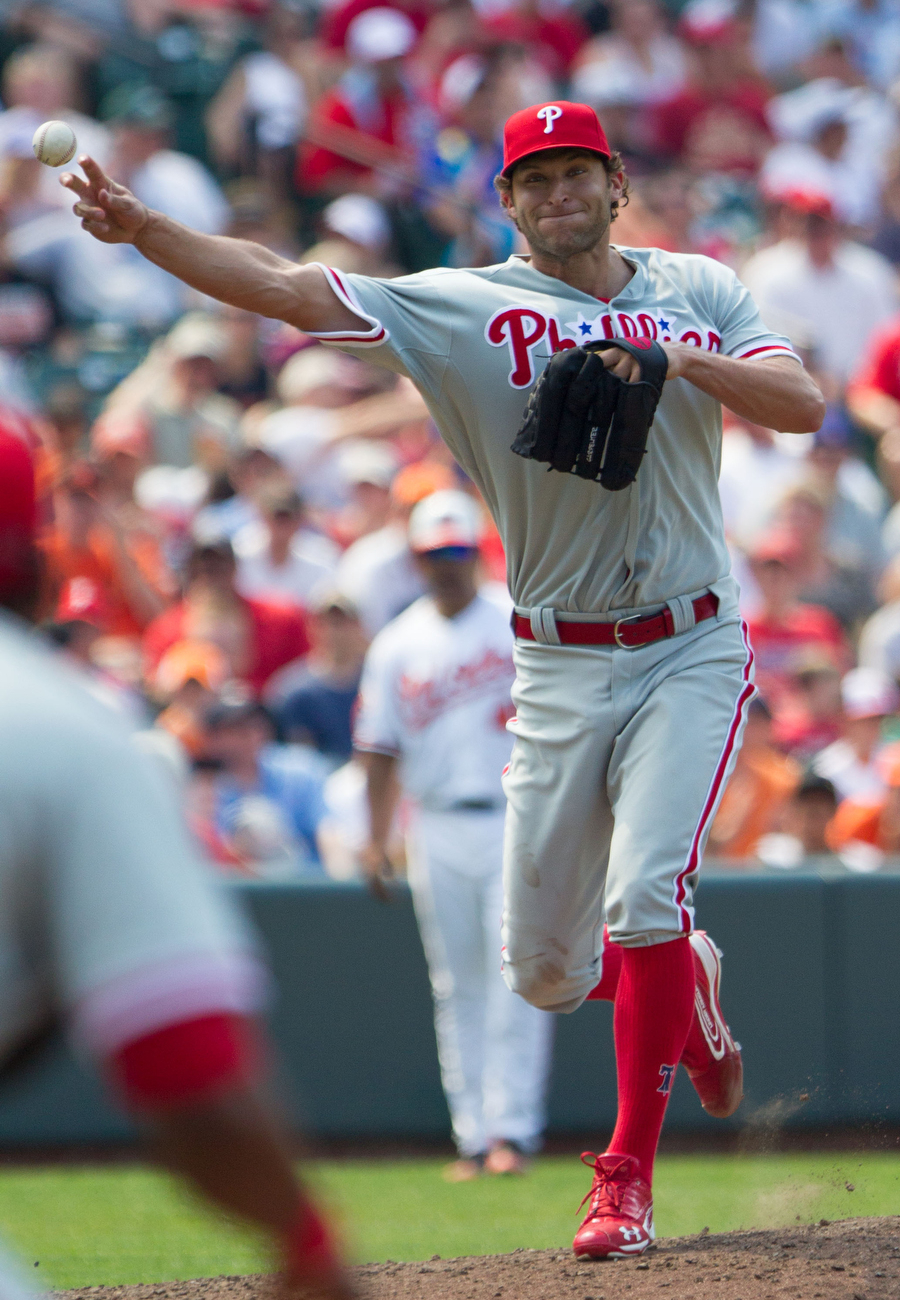
- Schwimer with the Philadelphia Phillies
- Pitcher
- Born: February 19, 1986 (age 40); Fairfax, Virginia, U.S.
- Batted: Right Threw: Right

MLB debut
- August 21, 2011, for the Philadelphia Phillies

Last MLB appearance
- August 19, 2012, for the Philadelphia Phillies

MLB statistics
- Win–loss record: 3–2
- Earned run average: 4.62
- Strikeouts: 52
- Stats at Baseball Reference

Teams
- Philadelphia Phillies (2011–2012)

Michael Fredarick Schwimer (born February 19, 1986) is an American businessperson and former Major League Baseball (MLB) relief pitcher who played for the Philadelphia Phillies in 2011 and 2012.

== Amateur career ==
=== High school ===
In high school, Schwimer played baseball and was 9–0 in 2004 with a 1.04 ERA while earning the 2004 Alexandria Sportsmen Player of the Year award, and being named the Virginia Independent School League Player of the Year and Second Team All-Metro at St. Stephen's and St. Agnes School. He was an Honorable Mention All-Metro pick in 2002, and was named an All-Interstate Athletic Conference selection in 2002–04. He also played high school basketball, and was a basketball All-Metro pick in 2004 and an All-IAC pick in 2003 and 2004. His senior year in high school, Schwimer averaged 21 points, 8 rebounds, and 6 assists per game. He shot 43% from the 3-point line that year, and led the team to the Sleepy Thompson Championship where he was named MVP over Roy Hibbert. Out of high school Schwimer was offered Division 1 scholarships to play football, basketball, and baseball. He was offered a full basketball scholarship to Duke and Louisville.

=== College ===
Schwimer attended the University of Virginia (UVA), from which he graduated in 2008 with a degree in sociology. He interned for a hedge fund while in college, and says that he would be working in that business if he were not a baseball player.

He also played for the Virginia Cavaliers baseball team. In 2006, Schwimer set a UVA single-season record for appearances (36), as he held batters to a .212 batting average in 60.2 innings. In 2007, in 23 appearances he held batters to a .229 batting average. In the summer of 2007, he pitched 33.1 innings for the Orleans Firebirds of the Cape Cod Baseball League, going 2–2 with 3.51 ERA. He was named to the 2007 Jewish Sports Review All American Team.

He was not drafted in the 2007 Major League Baseball draft, as he warned a number of interested teams as the draft approached the 10th round that he would not sign if drafted, because he would rather return to college for his senior year and attain his degree from UVA than sign for the amount of money offered in the later rounds of the draft. In 2008, he was 3–1 with a 1.72 ERA and 14 saves as the closer for UVA. His pitching repertoire included a "lively" fastball, a late-breaking "knee-buckling" slider, and a change-up.

== Professional career ==
=== Minor leagues (2008–11) ===
Schwimer was drafted out of college by the Philadelphia Phillies in the 14th round of the 2008 Major League Baseball draft.

In the minors, he was a relief pitcher; primarily a closer. Schwimer averaged 12.1 strikeouts per 9 innings in his minor league career, as he was 20–10 with a 2.51 ERA, and gave up 184 hits and 79 walks, while striking out 313 batters, in 233 innings through his August 2011 call-up to the major leagues.

In 2008, he had a 1.96 ERA for the Williamsport Crosscutters of the Low-A New York–Penn League. On July 7, he was named the NY-Penn League Pitcher of the Week. He averaged 13.5 strikeouts per 9 innings pitched.

Schwimer split 2009 between the Clearwater Threshers of the High-A Florida State League, for whom he had 20 saves (3rd in the league), 48 games (4th in the league), and a 2.85 ERA, and the Reading Phillies of the Double-A Eastern League, for whom he had a 1.35 ERA in 20.0 innings. Combined, in 2009 he averaged 12.4 strikeouts per 9 innings.

He started 2010 with the Reading Phillies, for whom he was an Eastern League Mid-Season All Star while he earned a team-leading 11 saves with a 3.60 ERA. Schwimer finished the season with the Lehigh Valley IronPigs of the Triple-A International League, with a 1.35 ERA as he held batters to a .080 batting average with runners in scoring position. Combined, in 2010 he averaged 11.4 strikeouts per 9 innings.

Schwimer began 2011 with the IronPigs. With them, he was 9–1 with a 1.88 ERA, and 10 saves. He had 86 strikeouts in 67.0 innings (averaging 11.6 strikeouts per 9 innings), giving up 50 hits and stranding 15 of 21 inherited runners. He sported an improved "nasty" change-up, better location of his low-90s-to-95-mph four-seam fastball, and his slider as he relied on deception and control for his strikeouts. He held right-handers to a .068 batting average. He was an International League mid-season All Star, and pitched in the Triple-A All-Star Game. In July, he was named the Phillies Minor League Pitcher of the Month.

=== Major leagues ===
==== Philadelphia Phillies (2011–12) ====
Schwimer was called up to the majors for the first time on August 17, 2011. He became the 29th UVA player to make it to the major leagues, joining former Cavaliers Javier López, Mark Reynolds, and Ryan Zimmerman currently in the big leagues. After the call-up he said "You can't ask for a better situation than this. Coming to the best team in baseball as a 25-year-old kid, it's a dream come true."

Even before he made an appearance in an official game, Schwimer appeared in the number 3 slot in a video on ESPN's "Not Top 10 Plays" feature in late August. The video showed the 6’ 8″, 240-pounder walking across Citizens Bank Park to the Phillies bullpen wearing a pink feather boa, dangling a pink purse, and a matching pink "Hello Kitty" backpack on his back. The backpack contains snacks for the team's relief pitchers, and team tradition calls for the most junior rookie pitcher to carry it to and from the bullpen.

Schwimer made his major league debut on August 21 against the Washington Nationals. On his second pitch in the major leagues, he gave up a game-tying home run to Nationals second baseman Danny Espinosa. Schwimer said: "I was thinking that it can't get much better than this. And after a few pitches, I was thinking that it can't get much worse than this." He retired the next eight batters, striking out four of them.

==== Toronto Blue Jays ====
Schwimer was traded to the Toronto Blue Jays on February 23, 2013, in exchange for minor-league first baseman Art Charles. Schwimer was placed on the disabled list at the end of spring training (March 31) with a strained right shoulder. He was removed from the disabled list on May 10 and optioned to the Triple-A Buffalo Bisons. Schwimer was designated for assignment by the Blue Jays on August 5. He was released on August 7.

== Business career ==
Schwimer started Big League Advance in October 2016, a company that invests in Minor League players, in exchange for an agreed-upon percentage of their future earnings should they make it to the Major Leagues. Average investments are about $350,000. In April 2018, the company was sued by Cleveland Indians minor league catcher Francisco Mejía, who accused the company of predatory lending techniques. In September 2018, Mejía dropped the lawsuit, and apologized for his accusations. In June 2025, the company was sued by San Diego Padres outfielder Fernando Tatís Jr., who also accused the company of “exploitative, predatory business practices".

Schwimer started Jambos Picks, a tout service, back in August 2019 only to reverse the course of the business just five months later. He is a contributor to the ESPN show The Daily Wager.

Schwimer made his debut on season 8 of High Stakes Poker on December 16, 2020. During Episode 1, Schwimer won the first six-figure pot of the new season with two-pair in a hand against Tom Dwan who had an over pair. Later in the episode, Schwimer made a straight against Bryn Kenney to win another six-figure pot. Schwimer didn't return until Episode 6 and posted another winning session after winning pots off Dwan and Jean-Robert Bellande. On Episode 7, Schwimer played a pot with Bellande where he was all-in on the turn with an over pair against the pair and flush draw of Bellande. The two agreed to run it twice, and Schwimer won both boards and doubled to $299,400. Later in the episode, Schwimer made trips on the river, but ran into the full house of John Andress. On Episode 8, Schwimer lost a big pot to Damian LeForbes who made a full house on the river to beat Schwimer's trips. Schwimer rebought for $100,000 before he doubled through Dwan with two pair against Dwan's top pair. On the penultimate hand of the episode, Schwimer would go bust when he called all-in on the river with two pair, but was up against the flopped set of Kenney. Schwimer quit the game afterwards.

== Personal ==
He was born in Fairfax, Virginia, to Dan and Cindy Schwimer, and is Jewish. Schwimer was the first Jewish player for the Phillies since Mike Lieberthal. Growing up, he attended Beth El Hebrew Congregation in Alexandria, Virginia, where he went to Hebrew school and had his bar mitzvah. He is 6' 8", and 240 pounds.

During his playing career, he trained with former number one ranked professional tennis player Andy Roddick in the off-season.

Schwimer is a minority shareholder in the Premier League soccer club Leeds United.

== See also ==
- List of Jewish Major League Baseball players
