= Brian Schneider =

American baseball player (born 1976)

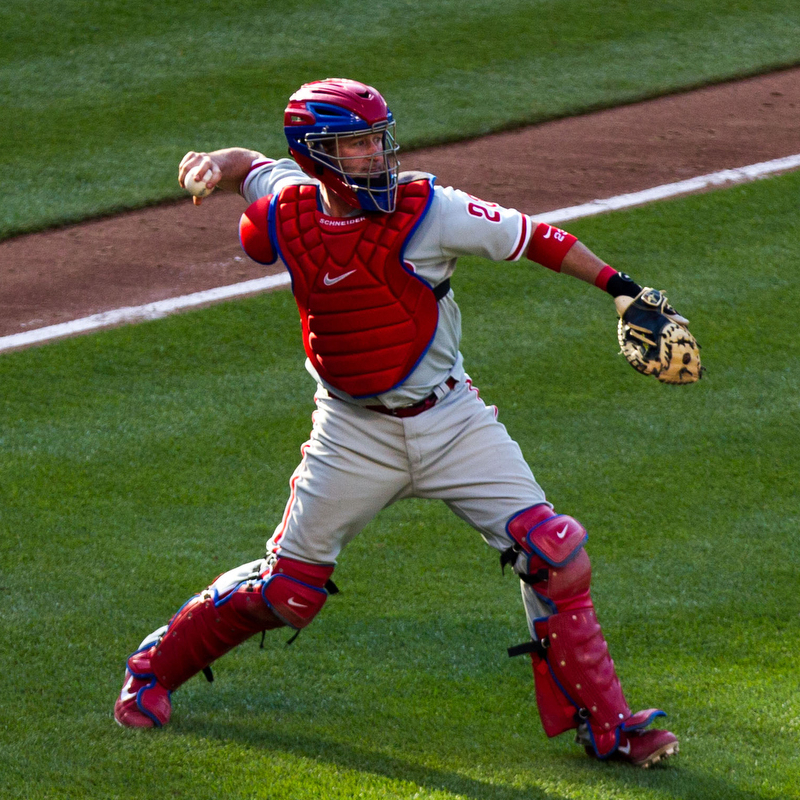
- Schneider with the Philadelphia Phillies in 2012
- Catcher
- Born: November 26, 1976 (age 49); Jacksonville, Florida, U.S.
- Batted: Left Threw: Right

MLB debut
- May 26, 2000, for the Montreal Expos

Last MLB appearance
- August 23, 2012, for the Philadelphia Phillies

MLB statistics
- Batting average: .247
- Home runs: 67
- Runs batted in: 387
- Stats at Baseball Reference

Teams
- Montreal Expos / Washington Nationals (2000–2007); New York Mets (2008–2009); Philadelphia Phillies (2010–2012)

Brian Duncan Schneider (born November 26, 1976), nicknamed "Hoops", is an American former professional baseball catcher and coach, who played in Major League Baseball (MLB) for the Montreal Expos/Washington Nationals, New York Mets, and Philadelphia Phillies. Schneider was the Miami Marlins catching coach from 2016 through 2019, and the quality control coach for the Mets from 2020 through 2021.

== Early life and education ==
Schneider was born in Jacksonville, Florida to Peter and Karen Schneider. He has one sister, Melissa.

=== High school baseball ===
Schneider played high school baseball and basketball at Northampton Area High School in Northampton, Pennsylvania, in the state's highly competitive East Penn Conference. In 1994 and again in 1995, he was named Player of the Year in the Lehigh Valley. Over the course of his high school career, Schneider hit .427, with 22 doubles, and 11 home runs, and set a Northampton High School record with 91 runs batted in. As a senior, he had a .484 batting average.

In 1995, Schneider signed a letter of intent to play college baseball at Central Florida.

== Playing career ==
=== Montreal Expos / Washington Nationals ===
==== Minor leagues ====
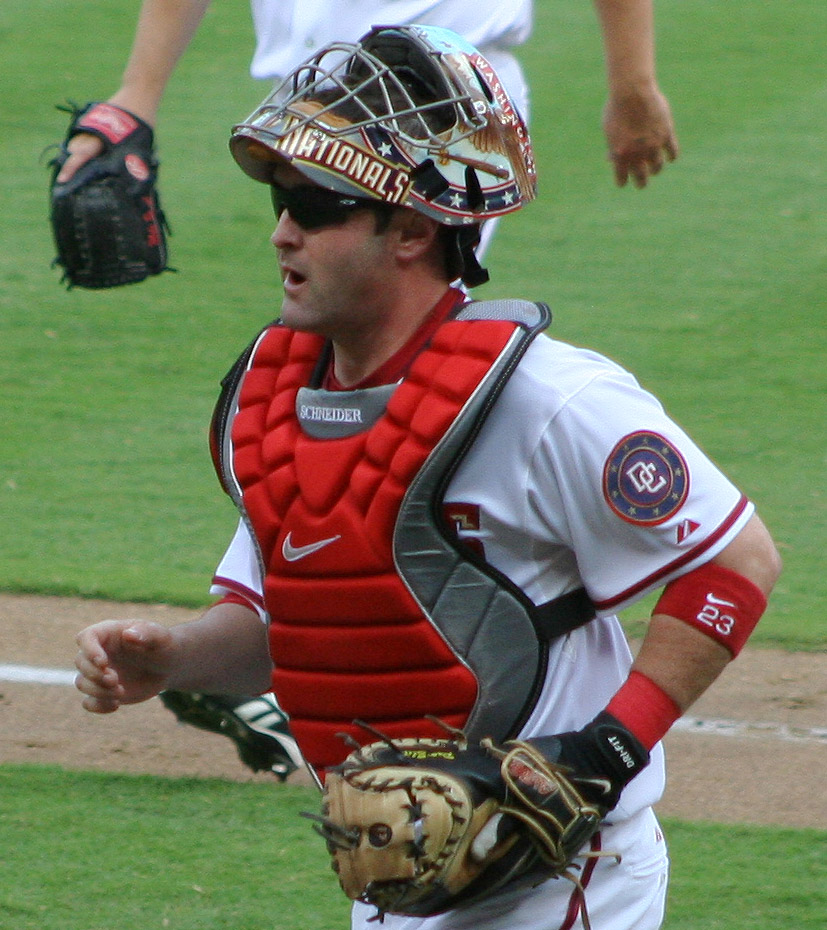
Schneider played for the Montreal Expos and Washington Nationals from 2000 to 2007.

Schneider was selected by the Montreal Expos in the 5th round (143rd, overall) of the 1995 June draft. In 1997, while at the Single-A Cape Fear Crocs, of the South Atlantic League, Schneider emerged as a premiere defensive player, while also posting solid offensive numbers, and was named to the mid-season All-Star team.

==== Major leagues ====
After making a strong impression at the Expos’ spring training in 2000, Schneider was called up to the big leagues, following an injury to regular catcher Chris Widger. Schneider made his MLB debut on May 26, 2000, on the road at the San Diego Padres’ Qualcomm Stadium, going 0-for-1, after coming into the game as a defensive replacement, in the 9th inning. The following day, he made his first big league start, going 2-for-3, including a double, in the 6th inning, for his first major league hit.

In the 2001 season, Schneider split his time between the majors and minors, making the most of his opportunities whenever he was given playing time with the Expos. He compiled a batting average of .317, in 27 games, driving in 6 runs, and scoring 4 times. On September 22, 2001, Schneider hit his first career home run, coming off Scott Elarton, in the fifth inning of a 3-1 Expos victory over the Colorado Rockies.

In 2002, Schneider served as the backup catcher to Michael Barrett. He made his outfield debut on June 4, 2002, against the Pittsburgh Pirates, playing left field, after pinch-hitting for Wil Cordero, in the eighth inning. In 73 games, Schneider hit .275, with 5 home runs, 29 RBIs, and 19 doubles. On September 24, 2002, he was honored as the Expos' nominee for Major League Baseball's first annual Roberto Clemente Award, losing out to Jim Thome.

In 2003, his fourth season with the Expos, Schneider caught a majority of the club's games for the first time, spending a total of 841 innings behind the plate. He was ranked fifth in the league in fielding with a .996 percentage, committing only three errors, in 709 total chances. At the plate, Schneider established career highs in numerous offensive categories, including hits (77), doubles (26), home runs (9), RBIs (46), total bases (132), and walks (37).

The 2004 season saw Schneider post career highs in hits (112), home runs (12), and RBIs (49). For the second straight season, he led major league catchers in throwing out base-stealers, with a 47.8 percent success rate. Schneider finished the season with a fielding percentage of .998, setting a new franchise single-season record for a catcher, in that category.

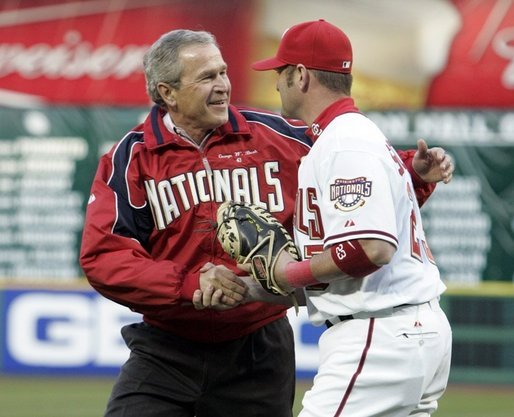
Schneider catches the first pitch at RFK Stadium from then-President George W. Bush at the Nationals' first home game on April 14, 2005

In 2005, the Expos franchise relocated to Washington, D.C. and became the Washington Nationals. Schneider was the first catcher in Washington Nationals history. That same year, Schneider threw out an MLB-leading 38 percent of would-be base-stealers. Between 2003 and 2005, Schneider threw out 43.5 percent of base-stealers, the best ratio in baseball over that period.

Schneider was a member of the United States national baseball team at the 2006 World Baseball Classic. He sharing catching duties with Jason Varitek and former Montreal Expos teammate Michael Barrett. Schneider went 0-for-6 in the tournament, but started the USA team's opener against Mexico.

Schneider struggled offensively during the first half of the 2006 season, hitting just .223 through August 4. His form picked up though, and he batted .324 with 9 doubles, 1 home run, and 21 RBIs, in the 42 games, thereafter. For the first time since 2002, Schneider did not lead either MLB or the National League (NL) in percentage of base-stealers thrown out, gunning down just 27%.

Schneider was behind the plate, catching Mike Bacsik, when Barry Bonds hit his MLB record-breaking 756th career home run, on August 7, 2007.

=== New York Mets ===
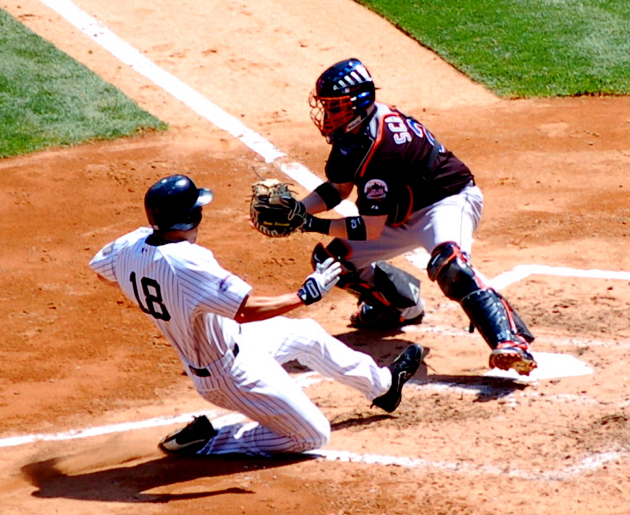
Schneider with the New York Mets in 2008

On November 30, 2007, the Nationals traded Schneider and Ryan Church to the New York Mets for top prospect Lastings Milledge. In his first season in New York, Schneider hit .257, with 9 home runs, and 38 RBIs, in 110 games. He scored the first-ever Mets run at their new ballpark, Citi Field, April 13, 2009, scoring on a double hit by Luis Castillo.

=== Philadelphia Phillies ===
On December 1, 2009, Schneider signed a two-year contract with the Philadelphia Phillies. On July 8, 2010, Schneider hit a walk-off home run to give the Phillies a 4-3 win over the Cincinnati Reds.

Following the completion of his initial Phillies contract, where he served as the team's backup catcher behind Carlos Ruiz, Schneider signed a contract for one more season in Philadelphia prior to the 2012 season.

After the 2012 season, Schneider announced his retirement from Major League Baseball, on January 29, 2013.

== Coaching career ==
Schneider managed the Jupiter Hammerheads in the Florida State League, during the 2014 season. On December 4, 2015, he was named as the new catching coach for the Miami Marlins.

Following the 2019 season, the Marlins did not renew Schneider’s contract. On January 3, 2020, he was named as the manager of the Syracuse Mets.

On February 7, 2020, Schneider was named quality control coach for the New York Mets, succeeding Luis Rojas, who was named Mets manager in January 2020. Following the 2022 season, the Mets and Schneider parted ways.

== Personal life ==
On November 6, 2004, Schneider married Jordan Sproat. The couple have four children: daughters, Tatum (b. 2007) and Haven (b. 2012), and sons Calin (b. 2009) and Holden (b. 2010). The family currently lives in Jupiter, Florida, with their dog, Rookie.

=== Catching For Kids Foundation ===
In 2008, Brian Schneider's Catching for Kids Foundation was established to support children and their participation in sports by providing funding and creative programming. The foundation strives to enable children of all backgrounds and physical abilities to enjoy the games they love.

=== Television ===
In 2015, as part of a job-swap documentary for Irish television, Schneider moved to Kilkenny in Ireland to train and play hurling as a goalkeeper for James Stephens; in return, Jackie Tyrrell trained with the Florida-based Major League Baseball team Miami Marlins.
