= Steven Lerud =

American baseball player (born 1984)

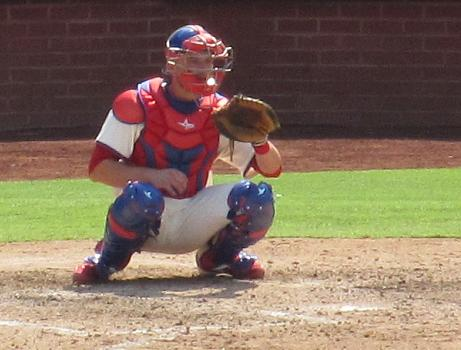
- Lerud making his major league debut on August 30, 2012
- Catcher
- Born: October 13, 1984 (age 41); Reno, Nevada
- Batted: Left Threw: Right

MLB debut
- August 30, 2012, for the Philadelphia Phillies

Last appearance
- June 17, 2013, for the Philadelphia Phillies

MLB statistics
- Batting average: .133
- Home runs: 0
- Runs batted in: 0
- Stats at Baseball Reference

Teams
- Philadelphia Phillies (2012–2013)

Steven James Lerud (born October 13, 1984) is an American former professional baseball catcher, who is currently a manager in the Chicago Cubs organization. During his playing days, he briefly played in Major League Baseball (MLB) for the Philadelphia Phillies (2012–2013).

== Early life ==
Steven Lerud was born in Reno, Nevada. Lerud attended to Galena High School, in Reno, Nevada.

== Playing career ==
=== Pittsburgh Pirates ===
Lerud was drafted by the Pittsburgh Pirates in the third round of the 2003 Major League Baseball draft. On November 9, 2009, he elected free agency.

=== Baltimore Orioles ===
On December 7, 2009, Lerud signed a minor league contract with the Kansas City Royals. However, on March 27, 2010, Lerud was traded to the Baltimore Orioles in exchange for a player to be named later. In 58 appearances split between the Double-A Bowie Baysox and Triple-A Norfolk Tides, he slashed a combined .190/.316/.351 with six home runs and 16 RBI. Lerud elected free agency following the season on November 6.

Lerud re-signed with the Orioles organization on a new minor league contract on December 26, 2010. He spent the 2011 campaign with Double-A Bowie, batting .193/.269/.303 with five home runs and 30 RBI. Lerud elected free agency again on November 2, 2011.

=== Philadelphia Phillies ===
On December 9, 2011, Lerud signed a minor league contract with the Philadelphia Phillies, who promoted him to the big leagues on August 24, 2012. He appeared in 3 MLB games during his rookie campaign, batting .200, in 10 at-bats. Lerud was subsequently dropped from the 40-man roster after the end of that season, but signed a 2013 minor league contract with the Phillies' organization. He appeared in 6 major league games with the Phillies in 2013, going hitless in 5 at-bats. Lerud elected free agency on October 1, 2013.

=== Atlanta Braves ===
He signed a minor league deal with the Atlanta Braves on November 11, 2013 and received a non-roster invitation to Major League spring training.

=== Washington Nationals ===
On January 12, 2015 Lerud signed a minor league deal with the Washington Nationals he was assigned to Triple–A Syracuse Chiefs the same day. He elected free agency on November 7.

=== Seattle Mariners ===
On February 3, 2016, Lerud signed a minor league deal with the Seattle Mariners and received an invite to spring training. He was released by the Mariners on April 7.

=== San Francisco Giants ===
On April 27, 2016, Lerud signed a minor league contract with the San Francisco Giants organization. In 60 games for the Triple–A Sacramento River Cats, he batted .229/.385/.288 with one home run and 19 RBI. Lerud elected free agency following the season on November 7.

=== Texas Rangers ===
On January 5, 2017, Lerud signed a minor league contract with the Texas Rangers that included an invitation to spring training. He did not appear in a game for the organization and elected free agency following the season on November 6.

== Coaching career ==
On January 19, 2018, Lerud was named as manager of the Minor League Baseball (MiLB) Low–A Eugene Emeralds, a Northwest League affiliate of the Chicago Cubs. In 2019, Lerud was named as manager for the Myrtle Beach Pelicans, the High–A affiliate for the Cubs.
