= Vance Worley =

American baseball player (born 1987)

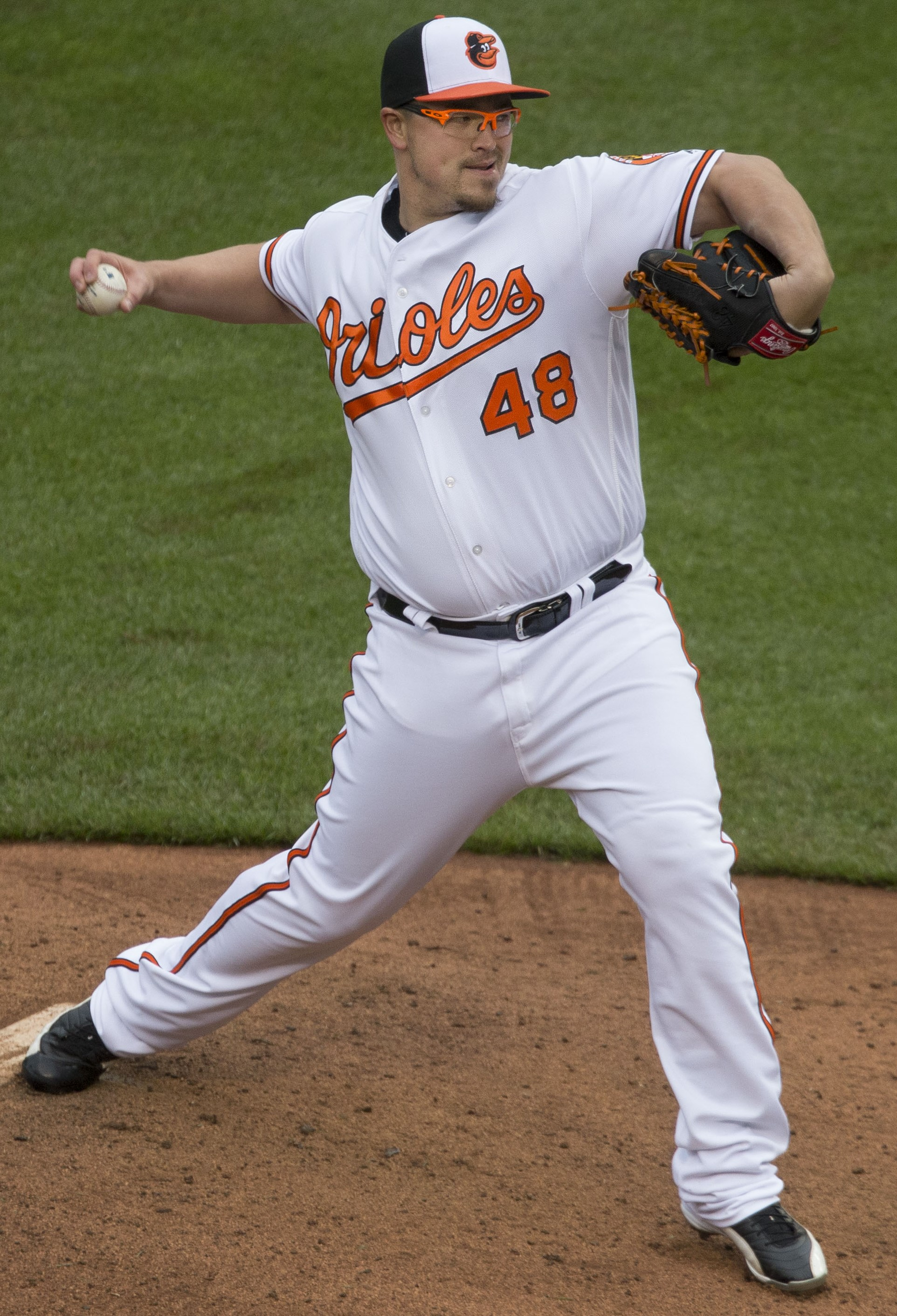
- Worley with the Baltimore Orioles
- Pitcher
- Born: September 25, 1987 (age 38); Sacramento, California, U.S.
- Batted: Right Threw: Right

MLB debut
- July 24, 2010, for the Philadelphia Phillies

Last MLB appearance
- September 27, 2017, for the Miami Marlins

MLB statistics
- Win–loss record: 35–36
- Earned run average: 4.09
- Strikeouts: 497
- Stats at Baseball Reference

Teams
- Philadelphia Phillies (2010–2012); Minnesota Twins (2013); Pittsburgh Pirates (2014–2015); Baltimore Orioles (2016); Miami Marlins (2017)

Vance Richard Worley (born September 25, 1987) is an American former professional baseball pitcher. He played in Major League Baseball (MLB) for the Philadelphia Phillies, Minnesota Twins, Pittsburgh Pirates, Baltimore Orioles, and Miami Marlins. Worley has also represented Great Britain internationally.

== Early career ==
After graduating from McClatchy High School in Sacramento, California, Worley was drafted by the Phillies in 2005, in the 20th round, but decided to go to college instead. He attended Cal State Long Beach (Long Beach State) and pitched for the 49ers baseball team. In 2006, he played collegiate summer baseball with the Chatham A's of the Cape Cod Baseball League.

In 2008, Worley was again selected by the Phillies, this time in the third round (102nd overall) of the MLB amateur draft.

In 2009, Worley moved up to the Double-A Reading Phillies; his record was 7–12 with a 5.34 ERA.

After two poor starts to begin the 2010 season, Worley's next 17 AA starts resulted in a 2.70 ERA over 103.3 innings, ending with a three-hit shutout on July 9. Worley also started eight games for the Philadelphia's AAA club, the Lehigh Valley IronPigs. His full-year minor league mark was 10–7 with a 3.36 ERA.

== Professional career ==
=== Philadelphia Phillies ===
Worley was called up to the majors for the first time on July 21, 2010. He made his major league debut on July 24, against the Colorado Rockies. He was returned to the minors after the game to make room for J. A. Happ. On September 6, Worley was recalled from Triple-A Lehigh Valley, and added to the active roster as a September callup. He made his first Major League start that day, pitching in the first game of a doubleheader against the Florida Marlins. Worley earned his first major league win against the Washington Nationals on September 19 of the same year while pitching in relief. He finished the 2010 season with a 1-1 record and 1.38 ERA in 5 games (2 starts).

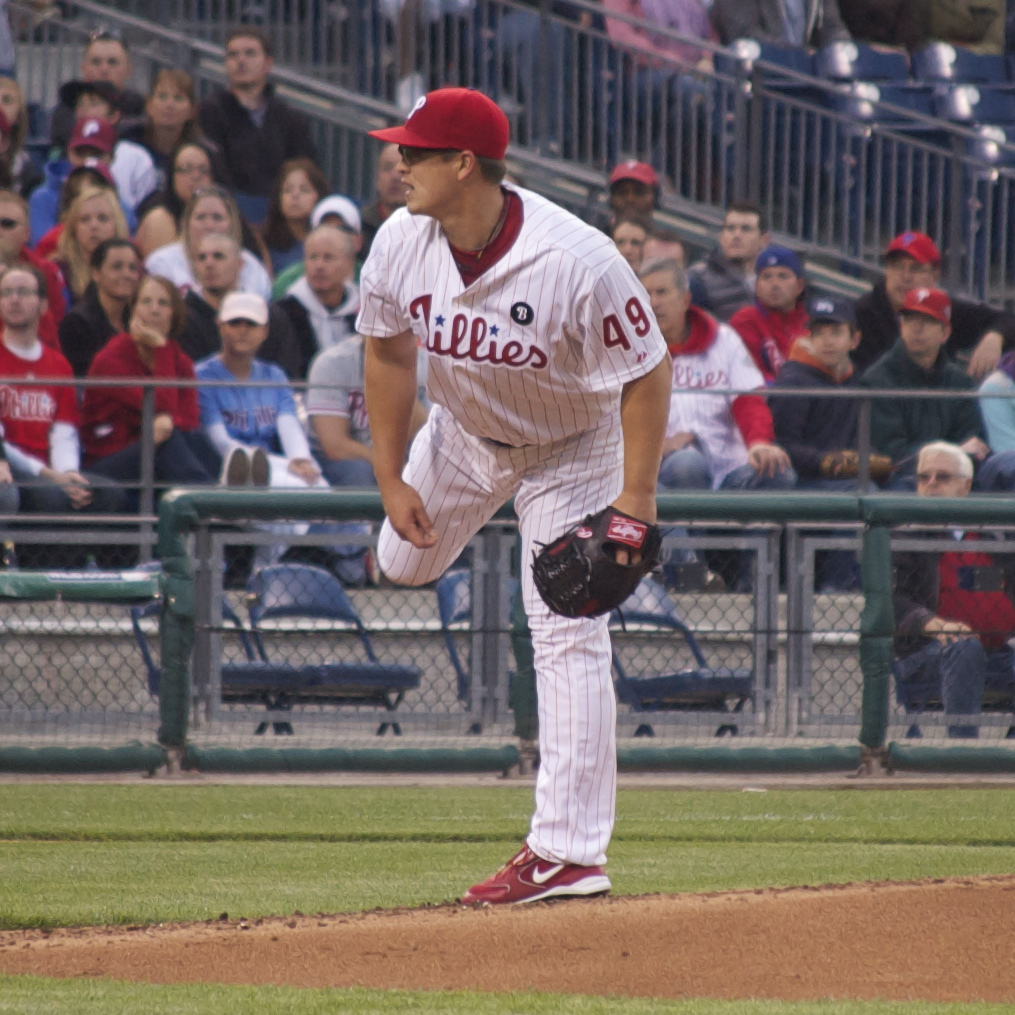
Worley pitching for the Philadelphia Phillies in 2011

On April 29, 2011, Worley was called up to the majors to be the team's fifth starter when Joe Blanton was put on the disabled list. He made his first start that day pitching 6 shutout innings and getting the win. He won his second start. Worley went 2-for-4 with a RBI in his first two starts. Vance threw his first career complete game on July 26, versus the San Francisco Giants. By September 8 the Phillies won each of his 14 previous starts, including games where Worley did not receive a decision. But after losing two of his next 3 starts, Worley was relegated to the bullpen for the remainder of the season. He closed the season with an 11–3 record and a 3.01 ERA. For much of the year, Worley was caught by Brian Schneider, the Phillies backup catcher. Worley's ERA was a full run lower when Schneider was his battery mate. Baseball America named Worley one of the five starting pitchers on its All-Rookie Team. Worley finished third in the NL Rookie of the Year voting, behind winner Craig Kimbrel and Freddie Freeman.

In 2012, Worley was sent to the disabled list with a bone chip in his elbow. His surgery to remove it was scheduled to be after the season, but after unsuccessful months of July and August, Worley was shut down for the season and sent to the DL for his surgery. In 2012 he was 6–9 with a 4.20 ERA.

=== Minnesota Twins ===
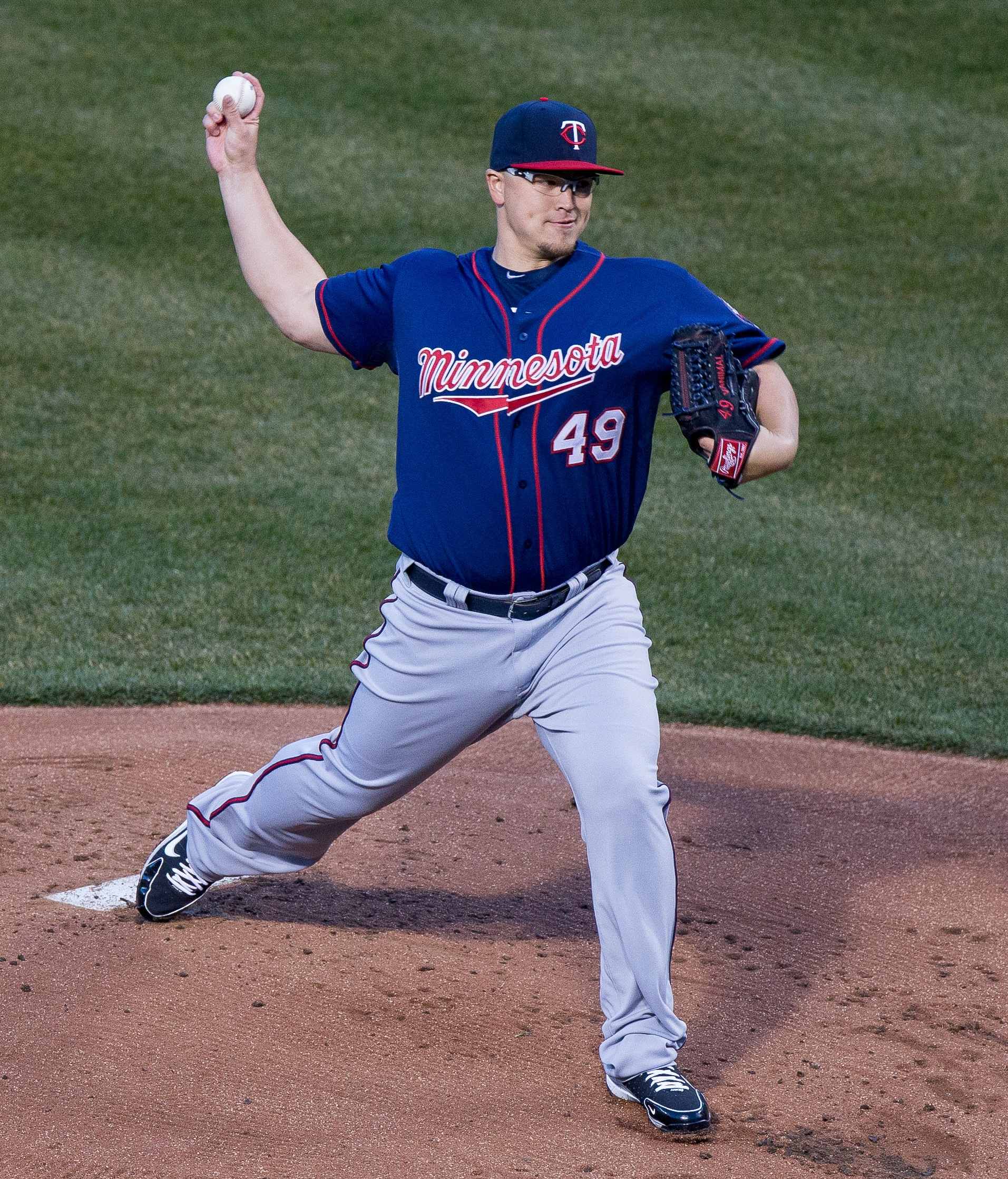
Worley pitching for the Minnesota Twins in 2013

On December 6, 2012, he was traded, along with Trevor May, to the Minnesota Twins for Ben Revere. On April 1, 2013, Worley made his first Opening Day start against the Detroit Tigers at Target Field in Minneapolis. On May 22, 2013, he was sent down to Triple A Rochester Red Wings for control problems. He finished his lone season with the Twins 1–5 with a career-high 7.21 ERA in 10 starts, as in 48.2 innings he gave up 82 hits. He was outrighted off the roster on March 21, 2014.

=== Pittsburgh Pirates ===
On March 25, 2014, the Twins traded Worley to the Pittsburgh Pirates in exchange for cash considerations. He spent the first half of the season playing for the Pirates' Triple-A affiliate, the Indianapolis Indians, with whom he was 3–2 with a 4.30 ERA. Worley made his first start for the Pirates on June 15.

After beginning the 2015 season in the starting rotation as a replacement for Charlie Morton who was on the DL, Worley was returned to the bullpen as a reliever upon Morton's return. Worley was designated for assignment by the Pirates on July 30 to make room for Joe Blanton, acquired in a trade with the Kansas City Royals. He was outrighted back to the Indianapolis Indians on August 7 after clearing waivers. For the Pirates, in 2015 he was 4–6 with a 4.02 ERA.

=== Baltimore Orioles ===
On October 20, 2015, Worley was claimed off waivers by the Baltimore Orioles from the Pirates. Worley made the Orioles' Opening Day roster and was the starter for their fifth game of the season. In 35 appearances (4 starts) for Baltimore, he compiled a 2-2 record and 3.53 ERA with 56 strikeouts across 86 2/3 innings pitched. On December 2, 2016, Worley was non-tendered by the Orioles, making him a free agent.

=== Washington Nationals ===
Worley signed a minor league contract with the Washington Nationals on January 28, 2017. Under the terms of the deal, he participated in major league spring training and could have received a $1 million salary if promoted to the major league roster, along with $1.65 million more in possible incentives. However, Worley was released toward the end of the Nationals' spring training on March 29, 2017.

=== Miami Marlins ===
On April 2, 2017, Worley signed a minor league contract with the Miami Marlins. In Triple-A with New Orleans, he was 2–5 with a 4.43 ERA and 22 strikeouts. Worley struggled flipping in between the rotation and the bullpen for Miami, going 2–6 and pitching to a 6.91 ERA and 50 strikeouts in 24 games (12 starts). On October 7, Worley was removed from the 40-man roster and sent outright to the Triple-A New Orleans Zephyrs.

=== Cincinnati Reds ===
On January 9, 2018, Worley signed a minor league deal that included an invite to spring training with the Cincinnati Reds. On April 3, Worley exercised the opt-out clause in his contract with the Reds, making him a free agent.

=== New York Mets ===
On April 19, 2018, Worley signed a minor league contract with the New York Mets. He made just four starts for the Triple-A Las Vegas 51s before he was placed on the disabled list, and was later released on June 22.

=== Somerset Patriots ===
On March 26, 2020, Worley signed with the Somerset Patriots of the Atlantic League of Professional Baseball. He did not play a game for the team because of the cancellation of the ALPB season due to the COVID-19 pandemic and became a free agent after the year.

=== Kane County Cougars ===
On April 26, 2021, Worley signed with the Kane County Cougars of the American Association of Professional Baseball. Worley recorded a 2–2 record and 4.01 ERA with 27 strikeouts in 5 appearances with the Cougars.

=== New York Mets (second stint) ===
On June 23, 2021, Worley's contract was purchased by the New York Mets organization. He made 16 appearances (15 starts) for the Triple-A Syracuse Mets, compiling a 4-6 record and 5.23 ERA with 39 strikeouts over 86 innings of work. Worley elected free agency following the season on November 7.

=== Kane County Cougars (second stint) ===
On May 5, 2022, Worley signed with the Kane County Cougars of the American Association of Professional Baseball. He made 18 starts and went 6–9 with a 4.89 ERA with 56 strikeouts in 114 innings. Worley was released by the Cougars on September 13.

== International career ==
Worley was selected to represent Great Britain at the 2023 World Baseball Classic qualification. He represented Great Britain again in the 2026 World Baseball Classic.

== Coaching career ==
On February 3, 2023, it was announced that Worley had been hired to serve as a pitching coach for Penn State Abington.

== Pitching style ==
Worley throws four pitches routinely. His primary pitch, a four-seam fastball runs 89–92 mph. He also has a two-seam fastball at 88–92, and his main off-speed pitch is a slider at 85–87 mph. Worley also sometimes adds a curveball in the mid-to-upper 70s. On rare occasions, he also features a changeup against left-handed hitters.

== Personal life ==
Worley's mother, Shirley, is Chinese. She was born in Hong Kong and moved to the United States as a child. His father's name is Scott. He lives in Philadelphia.

His nickname is "The Vanimal."
