= B. J. Rosenberg =

American baseball player (born 1985)

- Pitcher
- Born: September 17, 1985 (age 40); Newport News, Virginia, U.S.
- Batted: Right Threw: Right

MLB debut
- June 9, 2012, for the Philadelphia Phillies

Last MLB appearance
- July 4, 2014, for the Philadelphia Phillies

MLB statistics
- Win–loss record: 4–2
- Earned run average: 5.72
- Strikeouts: 52
- Stats at Baseball Reference

Teams
- Philadelphia Phillies (2012–2014)

B. J. Rosenberg
Medal record

Men's baseball

Representing United States

Baseball World Cup
Gold medal – first place	2009 Nettuno	National team

Brian James Rosenberg (born September 17, 1985) is an American former professional baseball pitcher. He threw right-handed, and was primarily a relief pitcher. He attended the University of Louisville, where he played for four years and graduated prior to the Philadelphia Phillies drafting him in the 2008 MLB draft, making his MLB debut for them in 2012.

== Career ==
Rosenberg was born in Newport News, Virginia, but attended Meade County High School in Kentucky.

=== Philadelphia Phillies ===
Coming out of the University of Louisville, he played college baseball for the Cardinals (where he earned a degree in sports administration), Rosenberg was drafted by the Philadelphia Phillies in the 13th round of the 2008 Major League Baseball draft. He spent the following three seasons in the lower levels of the Phillies' farm system, acting primarily as a closer. Between 2008 and 2010, he recorded 33 saves in 48 games while posting a 12–4 record between three levels despite being briefly sidelined with a latissimus dorsi injury.

Rosenberg opened the 2011 season with the Double-A Reading Phillies, where he briefly served as a starting pitcher. That season, he recorded a 4.17 ERA with a 5–7 record in 39 games. After again opening the 2012 season with the Reading Phillies, he was promoted to the Triple-A Lehigh Valley IronPigs.

On June 9, 2012, Rosenberg was added to the Phillies' 25-man active roster. He made his Major League debut that same day against the Baltimore Orioles, allowing two runs in one inning of work to pick up the loss in extra innings. Rosenberg made 22 appearances for the Phillies during his rookie campaign, compiling a 1–2 record and 6.12 ERA with 24 strikeouts over 25 innings of work.

Rosenberg made 22 appearances out of the bullpen for Philadelphia in 2013, registering a 2–0 record and 4.58 ERA with 19 strikeouts and one save across 19 2/3 innings pitched.

Rosenberg pitched in 13 games for the Phillies in 2014, logging a 1–0 record and 6.75 ERA with nine strikeouts over 12 innings of work. On October 27, 2014, Rosenberg was removed from the 40-man roster and sent outright to Triple-A Lehigh Valley.

Rosenberg signed a minor league contract with the Los Angeles Dodgers on January 30, 2015. The Dodgers released Rosenberg prior to the start of the regular season on April 5.
