= Jeremy Horst =

American baseball player (born 1985)

- Pitcher
- Born: October 1, 1985 (age 40); Cheyenne, Wyoming, U.S.
- Batted: Left Threw: Left

MLB debut
- May 28, 2011, for the Cincinnati Reds

Last MLB appearance
- June 15, 2013, for the Philadelphia Phillies

MLB statistics
- Win–loss record: 2–2
- Earned run average: 3.34
- Strikeouts: 70
- Stats at Baseball Reference

Teams
- Cincinnati Reds (2011); Philadelphia Phillies (2012–2013)

Jeremy M. Horst (born October 1, 1985) is an American former professional baseball pitcher. He attended Iowa Western Community College and Armstrong Atlantic State University. The Cincinnati Reds drafted him in the 21st round of the 2007 Major League Baseball draft. He played in Major League Baseball (MLB) for the Reds and the Philadelphia Phillies.

== High school ==
Horst played high school baseball at Des Lacs-Burlington High School in Des Lacs, North Dakota where they took second in state his senior year, behind his pitching. That same year he was named Mr. Baseball in North Dakota. He also played Legion baseball for the Burlington Bulldogs.

== Playing career ==
=== Cincinnati Reds ===
Horst started his professional career in 2007. He played one game for the Gulf Coast League Reds and 16 for rookie-class Billings in '07, going a combined 3–2 with a 3.24 ERA in 17 relief appearances.

He played 2008 for the single-A Dayton Dragons, starting 10 games and appearing in 36 total. He went 8–2 with a 2.38 ERA. He started all of his games in 2009. In 23 starts for the single-A advanced Sarasota Reds, he went 6–13 with a 3.25 ERA; in 5 starts for double-A Carolina, he went 1–4 with a 6.21 ERA.

Horst started 2010 with the single-A advanced Lynchburg Hillcats. In 11 relief appearances, he was 0–2 with a 4.30 ERA. He was promoted to Carolina, and in 27 relief appearances, he was 3–2 with a 2.09 ERA. Horst was then promoted to triple-A Louisville and went 1–0 with a 2.51 ERA in 6 appearances (2 starts).

He received a non-roster invitation to spring training for 2011. On May 28, the Reds purchased his contract from the minors.

Horst made his debut on May 28, 2011, in relief of Bronson Arroyo against the Atlanta Braves. Horst pitched the 4th and 5th and two outs of the 6th before being relieved by José Arredondo. His first major league strike out was of Jordan Schafer, his first batter faced. In total, Horst pitched 2.2 innings, giving up 2 hits and one run, walking 0 and striking out 4. He also got his first major league hit, an RBI single from Cristhian Martínez. The Reds ended up losing in the 12th inning by a score of 7 to 6. He was optioned on June 24 when the Reds activated Aroldis Chapman from the DL. Horst was recalled on July 15 when the Reds placed José Arredondo on the DL.

=== Philadelphia Phillies ===
Horst was traded to the Philadelphia Phillies on January 25, 2012, for infielder Wilson Valdez. On June 28, Horst and Brian Sanches were called up after Chad Qualls was Designated for Assignment and Joe Savery was optioned to Triple-A Lehigh Valley. In his debut with the Phillies, he pitched a scoreless ninth against the Pirates.

In 2013, Horst had several setbacks, culminating in an elbow injury which ended his 2013 season.

After Cesar Jimenez passed Horst on the organizational depth chart, the Phillies designated Horst for assignment on June 1, 2014. He elected free agency in October 2014.

=== Los Angeles Dodgers ===
In January 2015, Horst signed a minor league contract with the Los Angeles Dodgers and was assigned to the AA Tulsa Drillers to start the season. He was named to the mid-season Texas League all-star team after producing a 1.64 ERA in 32 games with nine saves. He was released on July 15, 2015.

=== Milwaukee Brewers ===
Horst signed a minor league deal with the Milwaukee Brewers on July 21, 2015.

=== Somerset Patriots ===
On March 15, 2016, Horst signed with the Somerset Patriots of the Atlantic League of Professional Baseball.

=== Vaqueros Laguna ===
On June 24, 2016, Horst signed with the Vaqueros Laguna of the Mexican Baseball League. He was released on February 18, 2017.
