= 2012 San Francisco Giants season =

Major League Baseball season

2012 San Francisco Giants
- World Series champions National League champions National League West champions
- League: National League
- Division: West
- Ballpark: AT&T Park
- City: San Francisco, California
- Record: 94–68 (.580)
- Divisional place: 1st
- Owners: Larry Baer (managing general partner)
- General managers: Brian Sabean
- Managers: Bruce Bochy
- Television: KNTV (NBC Bay Area 11) (Jon Miller, Mike Krukow, Duane Kuiper); CSN Bay Area (Duane Kuiper, Mike Krukow, Dave Flemming, Jon Miller)
- Radio: KNBR (680 AM) (Jon Miller, Dave Flemming, Duane Kuiper, Mike Krukow); KTRB (860 AM, Spanish) (Erwin Higueros, Tito Fuentes)
- Stats: ESPN.com; Baseball Reference

The San Francisco Giants are an American baseball team. Their 2012 season marked their 130th year in Major League Baseball, as well as their 55th year in San Francisco since their move from New York following the 1957 season, and the 13th at AT&T Park. The Giants finished with a record of 94–68. They finished in first place in the National League West, and defeated the Cincinnati Reds in five games in the NLDS thereby becoming the first National League team (eighth in MLB history) to come back from a 2–0 deficit in a best-of-five series by sweeping three games in the opponent's park. The Giants defeated the St. Louis Cardinals in seven games after overcoming a 3–1 deficit in the NLCS and advancing to the World Series to face the Detroit Tigers. They swept the Tigers in four games to win their second World Series title in three years. The season also saw Giants pitcher Matt Cain throw a perfect game on June 13, 2012.

== Season standings ==
=== NL West standings ===
NL West
Team	W	L	Pct.	GB	Home	Road
San Francisco Giants	94	68	.580	—	48‍–‍33	46‍–‍35
Los Angeles Dodgers	86	76	.531	8	45‍–‍36	41‍–‍40
Arizona Diamondbacks	81	81	.500	13	41‍–‍40	40‍–‍41
San Diego Padres	76	86	.469	18	42‍–‍39	34‍–‍47
Colorado Rockies	64	98	.395	30	35‍–‍46	29‍–‍52

=== NL Division Winners ===
Division leaders
Team	W	L	Pct.
Washington Nationals	98	64	.605
Cincinnati Reds	97	65	.599
San Francisco Giants	94	68	.580

Wild Card teams (Top 2 teams qualify for postseason)
Team	W	L	Pct.	GB
Atlanta Braves	94	68	.580	+6
St. Louis Cardinals	88	74	.543	—
Los Angeles Dodgers	86	76	.531	2
Milwaukee Brewers	83	79	.512	5
Philadelphia Phillies	81	81	.500	7
Arizona Diamondbacks	81	81	.500	7
Pittsburgh Pirates	79	83	.488	9
San Diego Padres	76	86	.469	12
New York Mets	74	88	.457	14
Miami Marlins	69	93	.426	19
Colorado Rockies	64	98	.395	24
Chicago Cubs	61	101	.377	27
Houston Astros	55	107	.340	33

== Record vs. opponents ==
2012 National League record Source: MLB Standings Grid – 2012
Team	AZ	ATL	CHC	CIN	COL	MIA	HOU	LAD	MIL	NYM	PHI	PIT	SD	SF	STL	WSH	AL
Arizona	–	2–5	5–4	2–5	9–7	5–3	6–0	12–6	3–3	3–4	2–4	3–4	7–11	9–9	1–5	2–4	9–6
Atlanta	5–2	–	3–4	1–5	6–1	14–4	4–2	3–3	3–3	12–6	12–6	3–4	4–3	3–4	5–1	8–10	8–10
Chicago	4–5	4–3	–	4–12	2–4	8–5	2–4	2–4	4–13	4–2	2–4	8–8	3–3	1–6	7–10	1–6	5–10
Cincinnati	5–2	5–1	12–4	–	5–1	10–5	2–4	3–3	9–6	6–2	3–4	11–7	6–2	4–3	6–7	2–5	7–8
Colorado	7–9	1–6	4–2	1–5	–	5–2	5–2	8–10	5–1	5–2	2–7	2–4	8–10	4–14	2–5	4–3	2–13
Houston	0–6	2–4	5–8	5–10	2–5	–	2–4	2–4	8–9	4–2	3–3	5–12	3–5	1–8	4–11	1–7	6–9
Los Angeles	6–12	3–3	4–2	4–2	10–8	4–2	–	4–2	1–6	4–3	5–2	6–1	11–7	8–10	6–5	4–2	6–9
Miami	3–5	4–14	4–2	3–3	4–3	–	4–2	2–4	4–4	4–12	8–10	1–4	5–1	5–2	2–5	9–9	5–13
Milwaukee	3–3	3–3	13–4	6–9	1–5	9–8	6–1	4–4	–	3–2	2–5	11–4	3–4	2–4	6–9	3–5	6–9
New York	4–3	6–12	2–4	2–6	2–5	2–4	3–4	12–4	2–3	–	10–8	5–2	4–3	4–4	4–3	4–14	8–7
Philadelphia	4–2	6–12	4–2	4–3	7–2	10–8	3–3	2–5	5–2	8–10	–	3–4	4–3	2–4	5–2	9–9	5–10
Pittsburgh	4–3	2–3	8–8	7–11	4–2	4–1	12–5	1–6	4–11	2–5	4–3	–	1–5	3–3	8–7	3–2	10–8
San Diego	11–7	3–4	3–3	2–6	10–8	5–3	7–11	1–5	4–3	3–4	3–4	5–1	–	6–12	3–3	2–3	8–7
San Francisco	9–9	4–3	6–1	3–4	14–4	2–5	8–1	10–8	4–2	4–4	4–2	3–3	12–6	–	3–3	1–5	7–8
St. Louis	5–1	1–5	10–7	7–6	5–2	11–4	5–6	5–2	9–6	3–4	3–4	7–8	3–3	3–3	–	3–4	8–7
Washington	4–2	10–8	6–1	5–2	3–4	7–1	2–4	9–9	5–3	14–4	9–9	2–3	3–2	5–1	4–3	–	10–8

== Game log ==
Legend
	Giants win
	Giants loss
	Postponement
**Bold**	Giants team member

2012 game log
April (12–10)

#	Date	Opponent	Score	Win	Loss	Save	Attendance	Record
1	April 6	@ Diamondbacks	4–5	Kennedy (1–0)	**Lincecum** (0–1)	Putz (1)	49,130	0–1
2	April 7	@ Diamondbacks	4–5	Hudson (1–0)	**Bumgarner** (0–1)	Putz (2)	34,789	0–2
3	April 8	@ Diamondbacks	6–7	Miley (1–0)	**Affeldt** (0–1)	Shaw (1)	24,193	0–3
4	April 9	@ Rockies	7–0	**Zito** (1–0)	Chacín (0–1)		49,282	1–3
5	April 11	@ Rockies	8–17	Reynolds (1–0)	**Mota** (0–1)	Chatwood (1)	30,337	1–4
6	April 12	@ Rockies	4–2	**Bumgarner** (1–1)	Moyer (0–2)	**Wilson** (1)	25,860	2–4
7	April 13	Pirates	5–0	**Cain** (1–0)	McDonald (0–1)		41,138	3–4
8	April 14	Pirates	4–3	**López** (1–0)	Resop (0–1)		41,657	4–4
9	April 15	Pirates	1–4	Correia (1–0)	**Vogelsong** (0–1)	Hanrahan (1)	41,766	4–5
10	April 16	Phillies	2–5	Halladay (3–0)	**Lincecum** (0–2)	Papelbon (3)	41,136	4–6
11	April 17	Phillies	4–2	**Bumgarner** (2–1)	Blanton (1–2)	**Casilla** (1)	41,101	5–6
12	April 18	Phillies	1–0 (11)	**Hensley** (1–0)	Bastardo (0–1)		41,860	6–6
13	April 20	@ Mets	4–3 (10)	**Romo** (1–0)	Francisco (0–1)	**Hensley** (1)	30,544	7–6
14	April 21	@ Mets	4–5	Rauch (2–0)	**Hensley** (1–1)		33,844	7–7
–	April 22	@ Mets	Game Postponed (rain) (to be made up as a doubleheader on 4/23)					
15	April 23	@ Mets	6–1	**Lincecum** (1–2)	Batista (0–2)		1	8–7
16	April 23	@ Mets	7–2	**Bumgarner** (3–1)	Gee (1–2)		23,866	9–7
17	April 24	@ Reds	2–9	Latos (1–2)	**Cain** (1–1)		19,051	9–8
18	April 25	@ Reds	2–4	Arredondo (2–0)	**Hensley** (1–2)	Marshall (4)	17,115	9–9
19	April 26	@ Reds	6–5	**López** (2–0)	Marshall (0–2)	**Casilla** (2)	17,317	10–9
20	April 27	Padres	3–5	Luebke (3–1)	**Hacker** (0–1)	Street (3)	41,908	10–10
21	April 28	Padres	2–1	**Lincecum** (2–2)	Bass (1–3)	**Casilla** (3)	42,375	11–10
22	April 29	Padres	4–1	**Bumgarner** (4–1)	Richard (1–3)	**Casilla** (4)	42,060	12–10

May (15–14)

#	Date	Opponent	Score	Win	Loss	Save	Attendance	Record
23	May 1	Marlins	1–2	Nolasco (3–0)	**Cain** (1–2)	Bell (3)	41,439	12–11
24	May 2	Marlins	2–3 (10)	Cishek (3–0)	**Casilla** (0–1)		41,575	12–12
25	May 3	Marlins	2–3	Sánchez (2–0)	**Vogelsong** (0–2)	Mujica (1)	41,159	12–13
26	May 4	Brewers	4–6	Loe (2–0)	**Hensley** (1–3)	Axford (6)	41,082	12–14
27	May 5	Brewers	5–2	**Bumgarner** (5–1)	Wolf (2–3)	**Casilla** (5)	41,135	13–14
28	May 6	Brewers	4–3 (11)	**López** (3–0)	Dillard (0–1)		41,796	14–14
29	May 7	@ Dodgers	1–9	Lilly (4–0)	**Zito** (1–1)		43,713	14–15
30	May 8	@ Dodgers	2–1	**Vogelsong** (1–2)	Kershaw (2–1)	**Casilla** (6)	32,799	15–15
31	May 9	@ Dodgers	2–6	Wright (2–2)	**Lincecum** (2–3)		33,993	15–16
32	May 11	@ Diamondbacks	1–5	Corbin (2–1)	**Bumgarner** (5–2)		35,792	15–17
33	May 12	@ Diamondbacks	5–2	**Cain** (2–2)	Cahill (2–4)	**Casilla** (7)	31,719	16–17
34	May 13	@ Diamondbacks	7–3	**Zito** (2–1)	Saunders (2–3)		35,430	17–17
35	May 14	Rockies	3–2	**Romo** (2–0)	Brothers (1–2)	**Casilla** (8)	41,254	18–17
36	May 15	Rockies	4–5	Brothers (2–2)	**Casilla** (0–2)	Betancourt (7)	41,332	18–18
37	May 16	Cardinals	1–4	García (3–2)	**Bumgarner** (5–3)	Motte (7)	41,324	18–19
38	May 17	Cardinals	7–5	**Cain** (3–2)	Wainwright (2–5)	**Casilla** (9)	41,225	19–19
39	May 18	Athletics	8–6	**Zito** (3–1)	Parker (1–2)	**Casilla** (10)	41,477	20–19
40	May 19	Athletics	4–0	**Vogelsong** (2–2)	Ross (2–4)		41,411	21–19
41	May 20	Athletics	2–6	Colón (4–4)	**Lincecum** (2–4)		41,378	21–20
42	May 21	@ Brewers	4–3 (14)	**Casilla** (1–2)	Pérez (0–1)		31,644	22–20
43	May 22	@ Brewers	6–4	**Cain** (4–2)	Marcum (2–3)	**Casilla** (11)	30,451	23–20
44	May 23	@ Brewers	5–8	Veras (3–1)	**Zito** (3–2)	Axford (7)	37,691	23–21
45	May 24	@ Marlins	14–7	**Vogelsong** (3–2)	Sánchez (2–3)		24,099	24–21
46	May 25	@ Marlins	6–7	Jennings (1–0)	**Lincecum** (2–5)	Cishek (1)	27,123	24–22
47	May 26	@ Marlins	3–5	Buehrle (5–4)	**Bumgarner** (5–4)	Choate (1)		24–23
48	May 27	@ Marlins	3–2	**Cain** (5–2)	Nolasco (5–3)	**Casilla** (12)	30,199	25–23
49	May 28	Diamondbacks	4–2	**Zito** (4–2)	Cahill (2–5)	**Casilla** (13)	42,295	26–23
50	May 29	Diamondbacks	3–1	**Hensley** (2–3)	Shaw (1–3)	**Casilla** (14)	41,371	27–23
51	May 30	Diamondbacks	1–4	Kennedy (4–5)	**Lincecum** (2–6)	Hernandez (1)	41,328	27–24

June (17–11)

#	Date	Opponent	Score	Win	Loss	Save	Attendance	Record
52	June 1	Cubs	4–3	**Bumgarner** (6–4)	Maholm (4–4)	**López** (1)	41,100	28–24
53	June 2	Cubs	2–1	**Cain** (6–2)	Garza (2–4)	**Romo** (1)	41,239	29–24
54	June 3	Cubs	2–0	**Zito** (5–2)	Wood (0–2)	**Romo** (2)	41,112	30–24
55	June 4	Cubs	3–2	**Vogelsong** (4–2)	Mármol (0–2)	**Affeldt** (1)	41,542	31–24
56	June 5	@ Padres	5–6	Street (1–0)	**Edlefsen** (0–1)		30,662	31–25
57	June 6	@ Padres	6–5	**Bumgarner** (7–4)	Richard (2–7)	**Romo** (3)	22,269	32–25
58	June 7	@ Padres	8–3	**Cain** (7–2)	Marquis (2–5)	**Casilla** (15)	22,015	33–25
59	June 8	Rangers	0–5	Harrison (8–3)	**Zito** (5–3)		41,163	33–26
60	June 9	Rangers	5–2	**Vogelsong** (5–2)	Feldman (0–5)	**Casilla** (16)	41,704	34–26
61	June 10	Rangers	0–5	Ross (6–0)	**Lincecum** (2–7)		42,418	34–27
62	June 12	Astros	6–3	**Bumgarner** (8–4)	Norris (5–4)	**Casilla** (17)	42,100	35–27
63	June 13	Astros	10–0	**Cain** (8–2)	Happ (4–7)		42,298	36–27
64	June 14	Astros	3–6	Rodríguez (6–4)	**Zito** (5–4)	Myers (16)	41,662	36–28
65	June 15	@ Mariners	4–2	**Vogelsong** (6–2)	Vargas (7–6)	**Casilla** (18)	29,818	37–28
66	June 16	@ Mariners	4–7	Iwakuma (1–0)	**Lincecum** (2–8)	Wilhelmsen (4)	30,589	37–29
67	June 17	@ Mariners	1–2	Wilhelmsen (3–1)	**Romo** (2–1)		40,603	37–30
68	June 18	@ Angels	5–3	**Cain** (9–2)	Williams (6–5)	**Casilla** (19)	41,234	38–30
69	June 19	@ Angels	5–12	Wilson (8–4)	**Zito** (5–5)		38,010	38–31
70	June 20	@ Angels	0–6	Weaver (7–1)	**Vogelsong** (6–3)		40,321	38–32
71	June 22	@ Athletics	5–4	**Hensley** (3–3)	Cook (2–2)	**Casilla** (20)	35,067	39–32
72	June 23	@ Athletics	9–8	**Bumgarner** (9–4)	Ross (2–7)	**Hensley** (2)	36,067	40–32
73	June 24	@ Athletics	2–4	Miller (2–0)	**Casilla** (1–3)		36,067	40–33
74	June 25	Dodgers	8–0	**Zito** (6–5)	Eovaldi (0–4)		42,164	41–33
75	June 26	Dodgers	2–0	**Vogelsong** (7–3)	Kershaw (5–4)	**Casilla** (21)	42,664	42–33
76	June 27	Dodgers	3–0	**Lincecum** (3–8)	Billingsley (4–7)	**Romo** (4)	42,245	43–33
77	June 28	Reds	5–0	**Bumgarner** (10–4)	Cueto (9–4)		41,626	44–33
78	June 29	Reds	1–5	Leake (3–5)	**Cain** (9–3)		41,960	44–34
79	June 30	Reds	1–2	Latos (7–2)	**Zito** (6–6)		42,135	44–35

July (12–12)

#	Date	Opponent	Score	Win	Loss	Save	Attendance	Record
80	July 1	Reds	4–3	**Casilla** (2–3)	Arredondo (4–2)		42,039	45–35
81	July 3	@ Nationals	3–9	Zimmermann (5–6)	**Lincecum** (3–9)		36,985	45–36
82	July 4	@ Nationals	4–9	Jackson (5–4)	**Bumgarner** (10–5)		35,806	45–37
83	July 5	@ Nationals	5–6	Clippard (2–2)	**Casilla** (2–4)		29,819	45–38
84	July 6	@ Pirates	6–5	**Zito** (7–6)	Bédard (4–10)	**Romo** (5)	37,565	46–38
85	July 7	@ Pirates	1–3	McDonald (9–3)	**Vogelsong** (7–4)	Hanrahan (23)	37,543	46–39
86	July 8	@ Pirates	2–13	Burnett (10–2)	**Lincecum** (3–10)		28,954	46–40
87	July 13	Astros	5–1	**Bumgarner** (11–5)	Rodríguez (7–7)	**Casilla** (22)	42,116	47–40
88	July 14	Astros	3–2 (12)	**Affeldt** (1–1)	Myers (0–4)		42,171	48–40
89	July 15	Astros	3–2	**Cain** (10–3)	Norris (5–7)	**Casilla** (23)	42,265	49–40
90	July 17	@ Braves	9–0	**Zito** (8–6)	Jurrjens (3–3)		29,623	50–40
91	July 18	@ Braves	9–4 (11)	**Casilla** (3–4)	Varvaro (1–1)		29,410	51–40
92	July 19	@ Braves	2–3	Hudson (8–4)	**Bumgarner** (11–6)	Kimbrel (28)	29,635	51–41
93	July 20	@ Phillies	7–2	**Lincecum** (4–10)	Worley (5–6)		44,205	52–41
94	July 21	@ Phillies	6–5 (10)	**Romo** (3–1)	Papelbon (2–4)	**Casilla** (24)	45,989	53–41
95	July 22	@ Phillies	3–4 (12)	Kendrick (4–8)	**Penny** (0–1)		44,551	53–42
96	July 23	Padres	7–1	**Vogelsong** (8–4)	Richard (7–11)		42,430	54–42
97	July 24	Padres	3–2	**Casilla** (4–4)	Thatcher (0–4)		42,559	55–42
98	July 25	Padres	3–6	Marquis (6–9)	**Lincecum** (4–11)	Street (17)	41,871	55–43
99	July 27	Dodgers	3–5 (10)	Tolleson (1–0)	**Romo** (3–2)	Jansen (20)	41,681	55–44
100	July 28	Dodgers	0–10	Billingsley (6–9)	**Zito** (8–7)		42,030	55–45
101	July 29	Dodgers	0–4	Kershaw (8–6)	**Vogelsong** (8–5)		41,902	55–46
102	July 30	Mets	7–8 (10)	Edgin (1–0)	**Casilla** (4–5)	Acosta (1)	41,300	55–47
103	July 31	Mets	4–1	**Lincecum** (5–11)	Harvey (1–1)	**Affeldt** (2)	41,774	56–47

August (18–11)

#	Date	Opponent	Score	Win	Loss	Save	Attendance	Record
104	August 1	Mets	1–2	Niese (8–5)	**Cain** (10–4)	Parnell (4)	42,188	56–48
105	August 2	Mets	1–9	Young (3–5)	**Zito** (8–8)		41,843	56–49
106	August 3	@ Rockies	16–4	**Vogelsong** (9–5)	Sánchez (1–9)		30,176	57–49
107	August 4	@ Rockies	11–6	**Bumgarner** (12–6)	Francis (3–4)		35,242	58–49
108	August 5	@ Rockies	8–3	**Lincecum** (6–11)	Chatwood (1–2)		28,804	59–49
109	August 6	@ Cardinals	2–8	Westbrook (11–8)	**Cain** (10–5)		38,652	59–50
110	August 7	@ Cardinals	4–2	**Zito** (9–8)	Lynn (13–5)	**Affeldt** (3)	41,293	60–50
111	August 8	@ Cardinals	15–0	**Vogelsong** (10–5)	Kelly (2–5)		36,906	61–50
112	August 9	@ Cardinals	1–3	Wainwright (10–10)	**Bumgarner** (12–7)	Motte (25)	32,810	61–51
113	August 10	Rockies	0–3	Chatwood (2–2)	**Lincecum** (6–12)	Betancourt (20)	41,729	61–52
114	August 11	Rockies	9–3	**Cain** (11–5)	Pomeranz (1–7)		42,483	62–52
115	August 12	Rockies	9–6	**Hensley** (4–3)	Belisle (3–4)		41,492	63–52
116	August 13	Nationals	2–14	Gonzalez (15–6)	**Vogelsong** (10–6)		42,050	63–53
117	August 14	Nationals	6–1	**Bumgarner** (13–7)	Zimmermann (9–7)		42,081	64–53
118	August 15	Nationals	4–6	Strasburg (14–5)	**Lincecum** (6–13)	Clippard (25)	42,133	64–54
119	August 17	@ Padres	10–1	**Cain** (12–5)	Ohlendorf (4–4)		38,755	65–54
120	August 18	@ Padres	8–7	**Mijares** (3–2)	Brach (1–3)	**Hensley** (3)	33,849	66–54
121	August 19	@ Padres	1–7	Richard (10–12)	**Vogelsong** (10–7)		28,605	66–55
122	August 20	@ Dodgers	2–1	**Bumgarner** (14–7)	Kershaw (11–7)	**López** (2)	36,878	67–55
123	August 21	@ Dodgers	4–1	**Lincecum** (7–13)	Blanton (8–12)	**López** (3)	56,000	68–55
124	August 22	@ Dodgers	8–4	**Cain** (13–5)	Capuano (11–9)		40,173	69–55
125	August 23	Braves	5–2	**Zito** (10–8)	Hanson (12–6)	**Romo** (6)	41,645	70–55
126	August 24	Braves	5–3	**Vogelsong** (11–7)	Sheets (4–4)	**López** (4)	41,486	71–55
127	August 25	Braves	3–7	Minor (7–10)	**Bumgarner** (14–8)		41,679	71–56
128	August 26	Braves	1–7	Hudson (13–4)	**Lincecum** (7–14)		41,735	71–57
129	August 28	@ Astros	3–2	**Casilla** (5–5)	López (5–3)	**Romo** (7)	13,516	72–57
130	August 29	@ Astros	6–4	**Kontos** (1–0)	Keuchel (1–7)	**López** (5)	13,207	73–57
131	August 30	@ Astros	8–4	**Vogelsong** (12–7)	Rodriguez (1–9)	**Romo** (8)	12,835	74–57
132	August 31	@ Cubs	4–6	Volstad (2–9)	**Bumgarner** (14–9)	Mármol (17)	32,476	74–58

September (19–8)

#	Date	Opponent	Score	Win	Loss	Save	Attendance	Record
133	September 1	@ Cubs	5–2	**Lincecum** (8–14)	Germano (2–5)	**Romo** (9)	32,477	75–58
134	September 2	@ Cubs	7–5	**Casilla** (6–5)	Mármol (2–3)	**López** (6)	39,760	76–58
135	September 3	Diamondbacks	9–8 (10)	**Romo** (4–2)	Shaw (1–5)		42,045	77–58
136	September 4	Diamondbacks	6–8 (11)	Collmenter (4–3)	**Kontos** (1–1)		41,038	77–59
137	September 5	Diamondbacks	2–6	Cahill (10–11)	**Bumgarner** (14–10)		41,035	77–60
138	September 7	Dodgers	5–2	**Casilla** (7–5)	Beckett (6–13)	**Romo** (10)	41,666	78–60
139	September 8	Dodgers	2–3	Belisario (5–1)	**Affeldt** (1–2)	League (11)	41,791	78–61
140	September 9	Dodgers	4–0	**Zito** (11–8)	Blanton (9–13)		41,517	79–61
141	September 10	@ Rockies	5–6	Moscoso (2–1)	**Vogelsong** (12–8)	Betancourt (28)	25,817	79–62
142	September 11	@ Rockies	9–8	**Kontos** (2–1)	Torres (4–2)	**López** (7)	26,631	80–62
143	September 12	@ Rockies	8–3	**Lincecum** (9–14)	Francis (5–5)		24,182	81–62
144	September 14	@ Diamondbacks	6–2	**Cain** (14–5)	Skaggs (1–2)		31,856	82–62
145	September 15	@ Diamondbacks	3–2	**Zito** (12–8)	Miley (15–10)	**Romo** (11)	39,169	83–62
146	September 16	@ Diamondbacks	2–10	Corbin (6–7)	**Vogelsong** (12–9)		29,051	83–63
147	September 17	Rockies	2–1	**Bumgarner** (15–10)	Moscoso (3–2)	**Romo** (12)	41,280	84–63
148	September 18	Rockies	6–3	**Lincecum** (10–14)	Francis (5–6)		41,718	85–63
149	September 19	Rockies	7–1	**Cain** (15–5)	Chatwood (4–5)		41,292	86–63
150	September 20	Rockies	9–2	**Zito** (13–8)	de la Rosa (0–1)		41,157	87–63
151	September 21	Padres	5–1	**Vogelsong** (13–9)	Kelly (2–2)		41,728	88–63
152	September 22	Padres	8–4	**Bumgarner** (16–10)	Werner (2–2)		42,418	89–63
153	September 23	Padres	4–6	Stults (7–3)	**Hensley** (4–4)	Street (22)	41,511	89–64
154	September 25	Diamondbacks	2–7	Collmenter (5–3)	**Lincecum** (10–15)		41,153	89–65
155	September 26	Diamondbacks	6–0	**Cain** (16–5)	Miley (16–11)		41,516	90–65
156	September 27	Diamondbacks	7–3	**Zito** (14–8)	Corbin (6–8)		41,128	91–65
157	September 28	@ Padres	3–1	**Vogelsong** (14–9)	Werner (2–3)	**Casilla** (25)	32,691	92–65
158	September 29	@ Padres	3–7	Stults (8–3)	**Bumgarner** (16–11)		42,397	92–66
159	September 30	@ Padres	7–5	**Loux** (1–0)	Street (2–1)	**Romo** (13)	33,407	93–66

October (1–2)

#	Date	Opponent	Score	Win	Loss	Save	Attendance	Record
160	October 1	@ Dodgers	2–3	League (2–6)	**Casilla** (7–6)		33,624	93–67
161	October 2	@ Dodgers	4–3	**Zito** (15–8)	Capuano (12–12)	**Romo** (14)	42,473	94–67
162	October 3	@ Dodgers	1–5	Kershaw (14–9)	**Hensley** (4–5)		34,014	94–68

=== Postseason Game Log ===
2012 Postseason game log
NLDS (3–2)

#	Date	Opponent	Score	Win	Loss	Save	Attendance	Record
1	October 6	Reds	2–5	LeCure (1–0)	**Cain** (0–1)		43,492	0–1
2	October 7	Reds	0–9	Arroyo (1–0)	**Bumgarner** (0–1)		43,505	0–2
3	October 9	@ Reds	2–1 (10)	**Romo** (1–0)	Broxton (0–1)		44,501	1–2
4	October 10	@ Reds	8–3	**Lincecum** (1–0)	Leake (0–1)		44,375	2–2
5	October 11	@ Reds	6–4	**Cain** (1–1)	Latos (0–1)	**Romo** (1)	44,142	3–2

NLCS (4–3)

#	Date	Opponent	Score	Win	Loss	Save	Attendance	Record
1	October 14	Cardinals	4–6	Mujica (1–0)	**Bumgarner** (0–1)	Motte (1)	42,534	0–1
2	October 15	Cardinals	7–1	**Vogelsong** (1–0)	Carpenter (0–1)		42,679	1–1
3	October 17	@ Cardinals	1–3	Lohse (1–0)	**Cain** (0–1)	Motte (2)	45,850	1–2
4	October 18	@ Cardinals	3–8	Wainwright (1–0)	**Lincecum** (0–1)		47,062	1–3
5	October 19	@ Cardinals	5–0	**Zito** (1–0)	Lynn (0–1)		47,075	2–3
6	October 21	Cardinals	6–1	**Vogelsong** (2–0)	Carpenter (0–2)		43,070	3–3
7	October 22	Cardinals	9–0	**Cain** (1–1)	Lohse (1–1)		43,056	4–3

World Series (4–0)

#	Date	Opponent	Score	Win	Loss	Save	Attendance	Record
1	October 24	Tigers	8–3	**Zito** (1–0)	Verlander (0–1)		42,855	1–0
2	October 25	Tigers	2–0	**Bumgarner** (1–0)	Fister (0–1)	**Romo** (1)	42,982	2–0
3	October 27	@ Tigers	2–0	**Vogelsong** (1–0)	Sánchez (0–1)	**Romo** (2)	42,262	3–0
4	October 28	@ Tigers	4–3 (10)	**Casilla** (1–0)	Coke (0–1)	**Romo** (3)	42,152	4–0

== Roster ==
2012 San Francisco Giants
Roster
Pitchers: 41 Jeremy Affeldt; 56 Travis Blackley; 40 Madison Bumgarner; 18 Matt Cain; 46 Santiago Casilla; 65 Steve Edlefsen; 52 Eric Hacker; 34 Clay Hensley; 70 George Kontos; 55 Tim Lincecum; 49 Javier López; 61 Shane Loux; 79,63 Jean Machi; 50 José Mijares; 59 Guillermo Mota; 37,43,87 Dan Otero; 31 Brad Penny; 52 Yusmeiro Petit; 54 Sergio Romo; 45 Dan Runzler; 32 Ryan Vogelsong; 38 Brian Wilson; 75 Barry Zito	Catchers: 28 Buster Posey; 29 Héctor Sánchez; 22 Eli Whiteside; Infielders: 13 Joaquín Árias; 9 Brandon Belt; 2 Emmanuel Burriss; 35 Brandon Crawford; 33 Charlie Culberson; 50 Conor Gillaspie; 17 Aubrey Huff; 6 Brett Pill; 48 Pablo Sandoval; 19 Marco Scutaro; 5 Ryan Theriot	Outfielders: 7 Gregor Blanco; 53 Melky Cabrera; 51 Justin Christian; 68,12 Xavier Nady; 16 Ángel Pagán; 57,14 Francisco Peguero; 8 Hunter Pence; 12 Nate Schierholtz	Manager: 15 Bruce Bochy; Coaches: 1 Tim Flannery (third base); 26 Mark Gardner (bullpen); 58 Bill Hayes (bullpen catcher); 39 Roberto Kelly (first base); 31,37 Hensley Meulens (hitting); 19,33 Dave Righetti (pitching); 23 Ron Wotus (bench)

== Events ==
- October 30, 2011 – The Giants re-sign LHP Javier López to a two-year contract and pick up a one-year option on LHP Jeremy Affeldt.
- November 7, 2011 – OF Melky Cabrera is acquired in a trade with the Kansas City Royals for LHP Jonathan Sánchez.
- December 6, 2011 – OF Ángel Pagán is acquired in a trade with the New York Mets for OF Andrés Torres and RHP Ramon Ramírez.
- December 12, 2011 – The Giants re-sign IF Mike Fontenot to a one-year contract and tender contracts to nine other arbitration-eligible players (Ps Tim Lincecum, Ryan Vogelsong, Sergio Romo and Santiago Casilla; IFs Pablo Sandoval and Emmanuel Burriss; OFs Nate Schierholtz and recent-trade acquisitions Melky Cabrera and Ángel Pagán). IF Jeff Keppinger and C Eli Whiteside are allowed to become free agents.
- January 27, 2012 – The Giants sign IF Ryan Theriot to a one-year contract.
- March 9, 2012 – In a spring training game, C Buster Posey returns to action for the first time since the injury which ended his 2011 season.
- March 30, 2012 – IF Mike Fontenot is released.
- April 2, 2012 – The Giants and RHP Matt Cain agree to a six-year contract extension worth at least $127 million.
- April 4, 2012 – The Giants acquire P George Kontos from the New York Yankees in a trade for C Chris Stewart. Spring training concludes with relative newcomers Gregor Blanco, Héctor Sánchez, Brett Pill, Clay Hensley, and Dan Otero included on the 25-man roster.
- April 9, 2012 – Barry Zito pitches a complete-game shutout against the Colorado Rockies at Coors Field for his first shutout as a member of the Giants. The game is the Giants' first win of the year after an 0–3 start.
- April 13, 2012 – Matt Cain pitches a one-hit shutout in a 5–0 victory over the Pittsburgh Pirates. The single hit by opposing pitcher James McDonald is the only baserunner allowed by Cain in the game.
- April 15, 2012 – Closer Brian Wilson is diagnosed with a season-ending elbow injury requiring Tommy John surgery.
- April 17, 2012 – The Giants and LHP Madison Bumgarner agree on a new six-year contract extension.
- April 25, 2012 – IF Joaquin Arias is recalled from Fresno as Aubrey Huff is placed on the 15-day disabled list.
- April 25, 2012 – Pablo Sandoval sets a franchise record with a 19-game hitting streak to start the season. The streak will ultimately reach 20 games.
- May 3, 2012 – 3B Pablo Sandoval breaks the hamate bone in his left hand and is placed on the disabled list, Sandoval broke his hamate bone in his right hand the year before.
- May 7, 2012 – RHP Guillermo Mota tests positive for a PED and is suspended for 100 games. Aubrey Huff returns to the roster to take his place.
- May 29, 2012 – Melky Cabrera sets a new San Francisco Giants record with 50 hits in the month of May. He would finish the month with 51 hits, tying Randy Winn for the Giants' San Francisco record for most hits in any month.
- June 5, 2012 – Freddy Sanchez has back surgery, ending his attempts to come back from a season-ending injury in June 2011.
- June 10, 2012 – George Kontos is called up from Fresno, completing the bullpen.
- June 12, 2012 – Madison Bumgarner hits his first major league home run while striking out 12 batters. The previous Giant to hit a home run and throw 10+ strikeouts in a game before Bumgarner was Mike Krukow, who was announcing the game.
- June 12, 2012 – 3B Pablo Sandoval returns to the lineup, while 3B Conor Gillaspie is demoted to Fresno.
- June 13, 2012 – Matt Cain throws a perfect game with 125 pitches thrown and 14 strikeouts. Cain's 125 pitches is the most pitches thrown in a perfect game and his 14 strikeouts ties Sandy Koufax's record for most strikeouts thrown in a perfect games.
- June 28, 2012 – LHP Madison Bumgarner throws the first shutout of his Major League career against the Cincinnati Reds. It is the fourth game in four consecutive shutout victories, the first three against the arch-rival Los Angeles Dodgers.
- June 29, 2012 – RHP Brad Penny, previously signed to a minor-league contract, is called up to the major league roster.
- July 1, 2012 – OF Melky Cabrera, P Matt Cain, C Buster Posey, and 3B Pablo Sandoval are named to the NL roster for the All-Star Game, each starting for their respected positions.
- July 6, 2012 – RHP Sergio Romo takes over the closer role from RHP Santiago Casilla.
- July 10, 2012 – OF Melky Cabrera is named MVP of the All-Star Game played in Kansas City, going 2 for 3 with a home run, 2 runs scored and 2 RBI as the National League routs the American League 8–0. Matt Cain, the starting pitcher for the NL, pitches 2 shutout innings to earn the win. 3B Pablo Sandoval breaks the game open with a bases-loaded triple in the first inning. C Buster Posey catches 5 shutout innings while drawing a walk and scoring a run.
- July 13, 2012 – LHP Madison Bumgarner becomes the leadoff pitcher in the starting rotation, swapping spots with Tim Lincecum.
- July 27, 2012 – IF Marco Scutaro is acquired, along with cash, via trade from the Rockies for infielder Charlie Culberson. IF Emmanuel Burriss is designated for assignment.
- July 31, 2012 – OF Hunter Pence is acquired via trade from the Philadelphia Phillies for OF Nate Schierholtz and minor league prospects C Tommy Joseph, and RHP Seth Rosin.
- August 6, 2012 – The Giants claim LHP José Mijares off waivers from the Kansas City Royals.
- August 15, 2012 – OF Melky Cabrera is suspended for 50 games after testing positive for elevated levels of testosterone. At the time, he had a major league-leading 159 hits and was second in the NL with a .346 batting average.
- August 31, 2012 – OF Xavier Nady, previously acquired on a minor-league contract, is promoted to the major league roster.
- September 15, 2012 – OF Ángel Pagán sets the Giants' San Francisco-era record with his 13th triple of the season at Arizona's Chase Field, breaking a record jointly held by Willie Mays and Steve Finley.
- September 21, 2012 – C Buster Posey is named recipient of the team's 2012 Willie Mac Award.
- September 22, 2012 – The Giants clinch their second NL West title in three years with an 8–4 victory over the San Diego Padres at AT&T Park. Sergio Romo gets Mark Kotsay to line out to Ángel Pagán for the final out.
- October 2, 2012 – The Giants defeat the Los Angeles Dodgers 4–3 at Dodger Stadium, eliminating the Dodgers from postseason contention.
- October 11, 2012 – The Giants defeat the Cincinnati Reds 6–4 at Great American Ball Park, winning the NLDS 3 games to 2. Buster Posey caps a six-run fifth inning with a grand slam home run off Mat Latos to propel the Giants to a 6–0 lead. The Reds would slowly come back, but with two runners on, the Giants holding a two-run lead, and the potential winning run at the plate in the bottom of the ninth inning, Sergio Romo retired Jay Bruce on a fly ball following a 12-pitch struggle before striking out Scott Rolen to end the series. The Giants become the first National League team of the Wild Card era to come back from a two-game deficit to win a five-game postseason series, and are the first team overall to do so by winning the final three games on the road.
- October 22, 2012 – The Giants defeat the St. Louis Cardinals 9–0 at AT&T Park to win Game 7 of the NLCS and the National League pennant. Matt Cain pitches 5 2/3 shutout innings as the Giants break the game open with a five-run third inning highlighted by a bases-clearing broken bat hit by Hunter Pence. In a driving downpour, Sergio Romo gets Matt Holliday to pop out to series MVP Marco Scutaro to end the game. Scutaro tied an LCS record with 14 hits in the series. The Giants outscore the Cardinals 20–1 over the last three games to come back from a 3–1 series deficit and tie the 1985 Kansas City Royals with six consecutive wins while facing elimination in the same postseason.
- October 24, 2012 – In Game 1 of the 2012 World Series, Pablo Sandoval ties a World Series record by hitting three home runs in one game, two of them against starting pitcher Justin Verlander, the reigning 2011 winner of the AL Cy Young, the AL Pitching Triple Crown, and the AL MVP. The Giants defeat the Detroit Tigers 8–3.
- October 27, 2012 – With a 2–0 victory over the Detroit Tigers in Game 3 of the 2012 World Series, the Giants become the first team to post consecutive shutouts in a World Series since the Baltimore Orioles did so in 1966.
- October 28, 2012 – The Giants defeat the Detroit Tigers 4–3 in 10 innings at Comerica Park to complete a four-game sweep and become 2012 World Series champions. Marco Scutaro singles home Ryan Theriot with the decisive run in the top of the 10th inning before Sergio Romo strikes out the side in the bottom of the frame, getting Miguel Cabrera looking for the third out to end it. Pablo Sandoval is named series MVP.
- October 31, 2012 – The Giants celebrate their World Series victory with a parade down Market Street in downtown San Francisco.
- November 15, 2012 – Buster Posey wins the National League Most Valuable Player award.

== Postseason ==
=== Division Series ===
The San Francisco Giants defeated the Cincinnati Reds to advance to the 2012 National League Championship Series.

==== Game 1, October 6 ====
9:37 p.m. (EDT) at AT&T Park in San Francisco, California

Team	1	2	3	4	5	6	7	8	9	R	H	E
Cincinnati	0	0	2	1	0	0	0	0	2	5	9	1
San Francisco	0	0	0	0	0	1	0	0	1	2	7	0
WP: Sam LeCure (1–0) LP: Matt Cain (0–1); Home runs: CIN: Brandon Phillips (1), Jay Bruce (1); SF: Buster Posey (1)

==== Game 2, October 7 ====
Sunday, October 7, 2012 – 9:37 pm (ET) at AT&T Park in San Francisco, California

Team	1	2	3	4	5	6	7	8	9	R	H	E
Cincinnati	0	1	0	3	0	0	0	5	0	9	13	0
San Francisco	0	0	0	0	0	0	0	0	0	0	2	0
WP: Arroyo (1–0) LP: Bumgarner (0–1); Home runs: CIN: Ryan Ludwick (1); SF: None

==== Game 3, October 9 ====
Tuesday, October 9, 2012 at Great American Ball Park in Cincinnati

Team	1	2	3	4	5	6	7	8	9	10	R	H	E
San Francisco	0	0	1	0	0	0	0	0	0	1	2	3	0
Cincinnati	1	0	0	0	0	0	0	0	0	0	1	4	1
WP: Romo (1–0) LP: Broxton (0–1); Home runs: SF: None; CIN: None

==== Game 4, October 10 ====
Wednesday, October 10, 2012 at Great American Ball Park in Cincinnati

Team	1	2	3	4	5	6	7	8	9	R	H	E
San Francisco	1	2	0	0	2	0	3	0	0	8	11	1
Cincinnati	1	0	1	0	0	1	0	0	0	3	9	0
WP: Lincecum (1–0) LP: Leake (0–1); Home runs: SF: Ángel Pagán (1), Gregor Blanco (1), Pablo Sandoval (1); CIN: Ryan Ludwick (2)

==== Game 5, October 11 ====
Thursday, October 11, 2012 at Great American Ball Park in Cincinnati

Team	1	2	3	4	5	6	7	8	9	R	H	E
San Francisco	0	0	0	0	6	0	0	0	0	6	9	1
Cincinnati	0	0	0	0	2	1	0	0	1	4	12	1
WP: Cain (1–1) LP: Latos (0–1) Sv: Romo (1); Home runs: SF: Buster Posey (2); CIN: Ryan Ludwick (3)

=== Championship Series ===
The San Francisco Giants defeated the St. Louis Cardinals for the National League title.

==== Game 1, October 14 ====
Sunday, October 14, 2012 at AT&T Park in San Francisco, California

Team	1	2	3	4	5	6	7	8	9	R	H	E
St. Louis	0	2	0	4	0	0	0	0	0	6	8	0
San Francisco	0	0	0	4	0	0	0	0	0	4	7	1
WP: Mujica (1–0) LP: Bumgarner (0–1) Sv: Motte (1); Home runs: STL: Carlos Beltrán (1), David Freese (1); SF: None

==== Game 2, October 15 ====
Monday, October 15, 2012 at AT&T Park in San Francisco, California

Team	1	2	3	4	5	6	7	8	9	R	H	E
St. Louis	0	1	0	0	0	0	0	0	0	1	5	2
San Francisco	1	0	0	4	0	0	0	2	X	7	12	0
WP: Vogelsong (1–0) LP: Carpenter (0–1); Home runs: STL: None; SF: Ángel Pagán (1)

==== Game 3, October 17 ====
Wednesday, October 17, 2012 at Busch Stadium in St. Louis, Missouri

Team	1	2	3	4	5	6	7	8	9	R	H	E
San Francisco	0	0	1	0	0	0	0	0	0	1	9	1
St. Louis	0	0	2	0	0	0	1	0	0	3	6	0
WP: Lohse (1–0) LP: Cain (0–1) Sv: Motte (2); Home runs: SF: None; STL: Matt Carpenter (1)

==== Game 4, October 18 ====
Thursday, October 18, 2012 at Busch Stadium in St. Louis, Missouri

Team	1	2	3	4	5	6	7	8	9	R	H	E
San Francisco	0	1	0	0	0	0	0	0	2	3	6	1
St. Louis	2	0	0	0	2	2	2	0	X	8	12	0
WP: Wainwright (1–0) LP: Lincecum (0–1); Home runs: SF: Hunter Pence (1) Pablo Sandoval (1); STL: None

==== Game 5, October 19 ====
Friday, October 19, 2012 at Busch Stadium in St. Louis, Missouri

Team	1	2	3	4	5	6	7	8	9	R	H	E
San Francisco	0	0	0	4	0	0	0	1	0	5	6	0
St. Louis	0	0	0	0	0	0	0	0	0	0	7	1
WP: Zito (1–0) LP: Lynn (0–1); Home runs: SF: Pablo Sandoval (2); STL: None

==== Game 6, October 21 ====
Sunday, October 21, 2012 – 7:45 p.m. (EDT) at AT&T Park in San Francisco, California

Team	1	2	3	4	5	6	7	8	9	R	H	E
St. Louis	0	0	0	0	0	1	0	0	0	1	5	1
San Francisco	1	4	0	0	0	0	0	1	X	6	9	1
WP: Ryan Vogelsong (2–0) LP: Chris Carpenter (0–2); Home runs: STL: None; SF: None

==== Game 7, October 22 ====
Monday, October 22, 2012 at AT&T Park in San Francisco, California

Team	1	2	3	4	5	6	7	8	9	R	H	E
St. Louis	0	0	0	0	0	0	0	0	0	0	7	2
San Francisco	1	1	5	0	0	0	1	1	X	9	14	0
WP: Cain (1–1) LP: Lohse (1–1); Home runs: STL: None; SF: Brandon Belt (1)

=== World Series ===
The Giants swept the Detroit Tigers 4–0 to win the World Series Championship. The sweep marks as the franchise's first-ever in a playoffs or championship while in San Francisco.

==== Game 1, October 24 ====
Wednesday, October 24, 2012 at AT&T Park in San Francisco, California

Team	1	2	3	4	5	6	7	8	9	R	H	E
Detroit	0	0	0	0	0	1	0	0	2	3	8	0
San Francisco	1	0	3	1	1	0	2	0	X	8	11	0
WP: Zito (1–0) LP: Verlander (0–1); Home runs: DET: Jhonny Peralta (1); SF: Pablo Sandoval 3 (3)

==== Game 2, October 25 ====
Thursday, October 25, 2012 at AT&T Park in San Francisco, California

Team	1	2	3	4	5	6	7	8	9	R	H	E
Detroit	0	0	0	0	0	0	0	0	0	0	2	0
San Francisco	0	0	0	0	0	0	1	1	X	2	5	0
WP: Bumgarner (1–0) LP: Fister (0–1) Sv: Romo (1); Home runs: DET: None; SF: None

==== Game 3, October 27 ====
Saturday, October 27, 2012 at Comerica Park in Detroit, Michigan

Team	1	2	3	4	5	6	7	8	9	R	H	E
San Francisco	0	2	0	0	0	0	0	0	0	2	7	1
Detroit	0	0	0	0	0	0	0	0	0	0	5	1
WP: Vogelsong (1–0) LP: Sánchez (0–1) Sv: Romo (2); Home runs: SF: None; DET: None

==== Game 4, October 28 ====
Sunday, October 28, 2012 – 8:15 p.m. (EDT) at Comerica Park in Detroit, Michigan

Team	1	2	3	4	5	6	7	8	9	10	R	H	E
San Francisco	0	1	0	0	0	2	0	0	0	1	4	9	0
Detroit	0	0	2	0	0	1	0	0	0	0	3	5	0
WP: Santiago Casilla (1–0) LP: Phil Coke (0–1) Sv: Sergio Romo (3); Home runs: SF: Buster Posey (1); DET: Miguel Cabrera (1), Delmon Young (1)

== Batting ==
Note: G = Games played; AB = At bats; R = Runs scored; H = Hits; 2B = Doubles; 3B = Triples; HR = Home runs; RBI = Runs batted in; AVG = Batting average; SB = Stolen bases

Player	G	AB	R	H	2B	3B	HR	RBI	AVG	SB
Buster Posey	148	530	78	178	39	1	24	103	.336	1
Brandon Belt	145	411	47	113	27	6	7	56	.275	12
Ryan Theriot	104	352	45	95	16	1	0	28	.270	13
Brandon Crawford	143	435	44	108	26	3	4	45	.248	1
Pablo Sandoval	108	396	59	112	25	2	12	63	.283	1
Melky Cabrera	113	459	84	159	25	10	11	60	.346	13
Ángel Pagán	154	605	95	174	38	15	8	56	.288	29
Hunter Pence	59	219	28	48	11	2	7	45	.219	1
Gregor Blanco	141	393	56	96	14	5	5	34	.244	26
Joaquin Arias	112	319	30	86	13	5	5	34	.270	5
Marco Scutaro	61	268	40	88	16	1	3	44	.362	2
Héctor Sánchez	74	218	22	61	15	0	3	34	.280	0
Nate Schierholtz	77	175	15	44	4	5	5	16	.251	3
Emmanuel Burriss	60	136	15	29	1	0	0	7	.213	5
Brett Pill	48	105	10	22	3	0	4	11	.210	1
Aubrey Huff	52	78	7	15	4	0	1	7	.192	0
Justin Christian	34	56	6	7	1	0	0	2	.125	2
Xavier Nady	19	50	6	12	3	1	1	7	.240	0
Charlie Culberson	6	22	0	3	0	0	0	1	.136	0
Conor Gillaspie	6	20	2	3	1	0	0	2	.150	0
Francisco Peguero	17	16	6	3	0	0	0	0	.188	3
Eli Whiteside	12	11	3	1	1	0	0	2	.091	0
Pitcher totals	162	309	20	38	4	0	3	18	.123	0
Team totals	162	5558	718	1495	287	57	103	675	.269	118

== Pitching ==
Note: W = Wins; L = Losses; ERA = Earned run average; G = Games pitched; GS = Games started; SV = Saves; IP = Innings pitched; H = Hits allowed; R = Runs allowed; ER = Earned runs allowed; BB = Walks allowed; K = Strikeouts

Player	W	L	ERA	G	GS	SV	IP	H	R	ER	BB	K
Matt Cain	16	5	2.79	32	32	0	219.1	177	73	68	51	193
Madison Bumgarner	16	11	3.37	32	32	0	208.1	183	87	78	49	191
Ryan Vogelsong	14	9	3.37	31	31	0	189.2	171	76	71	62	158
Tim Lincecum	10	15	5.18	33	33	0	186.0	183	111	107	90	190
Barry Zito	15	8	4.15	32	32	0	184.1	186	91	85	70	114
Santiago Casilla	7	6	2.84	73	0	25	63.1	55	24	20	22	55
Jeremy Affeldt	1	2	2.70	67	0	3	63.1	57	23	19	23	57
Sergio Romo	4	2	1.79	69	0	14	55.1	37	11	11	10	63
Clay Hensley	4	5	4.62	60	0	3	50.2	50	30	26	30	42
George Kontos	2	1	2.47	44	0	0	43.2	34	15	12	12	44
Javier López	3	0	2.50	70	0	7	36.0	37	13	10	14	28
Brad Penny	0	1	6.11	22	0	0	28.0	42	22	19	9	10
Shane Loux	1	0	4.97	19	0	0	25.1	32	15	14	9	9
Guillermo Mota	0	1	5.23	26	0	0	20.2	24	13	12	8	24
José Mijares	1	0	2.55	27	0	0	17.2	14	5	5	8	20
Steve Edlefsen	0	1	4.70	14	0	0	15.1	20	8	8	6	9
Dan Otero	0	0	5.84	12	0	0	12.1	19	11	8	2	8
Eric Hacker	0	1	5.59	4	1	0	9.2	14	6	6	2	8
Jean Machi	0	0	6.75	8	0	0	6.2	7	5	5	1	4
Travis Blackley	0	0	9.00	4	0	0	5.0	7	6	5	2	2
Yusmeiro Petit	0	0	3.86	1	1	0	4.2	7	2	2	4	1
Dan Runzler	0	0	0.00	6	0	0	3.2	1	0	0	3	5
Brian Wilson	0	0	9.00	2	0	1	2.0	4	2	2	2	2
Team totals	94	68	3.68	162	162	53	1451.0	1361	649	593	489	1237

== Farm system ==
Level	Team	League	Manager
AAA	Fresno Grizzlies	Pacific Coast League	Bob Mariano
AA	Richmond Flying Squirrels	Eastern League	Dave Machemer
A	San Jose Giants	California League	Andy Skeels
A	Augusta GreenJackets	South Atlantic League	Lipso Nava
A-Short Season	Salem-Keizer Volcanoes	Northwest League	Tom Trebelhorn
Rookie	AZL Giants	Arizona League	Derin McMains
