= Theriot =

Theriot or Thériot (English: /ˈtɛrioʊ/, French: [teʁjo]) is a surname. Notable people with the surname include:

- Irénée Thériot (1859–1947), French bryologist and school teacher
- Jamie Theriot (born 1979), American jockey
- Julie Theriot (born 1967), American biologist
- Ryan Theriot (born 1979), American baseball player
- Sam H. Theriot (born 1954), American politician
- Shane Theriot (born 1972), American musician

== See also ==
- Theriot, Lafourche Parish, Louisiana
- Theriot, Terrebonne Parish, Louisiana
- Thieriot
