= Theriot, Louisiana =

Theriot is the name of some places in the U.S. state of Louisiana:

- Theriot, Terrebonne Parish, Louisiana
- Theriot, Lafourche Parish, Louisiana
