= Matt Cain's perfect game =

22nd perfect game in MLB history

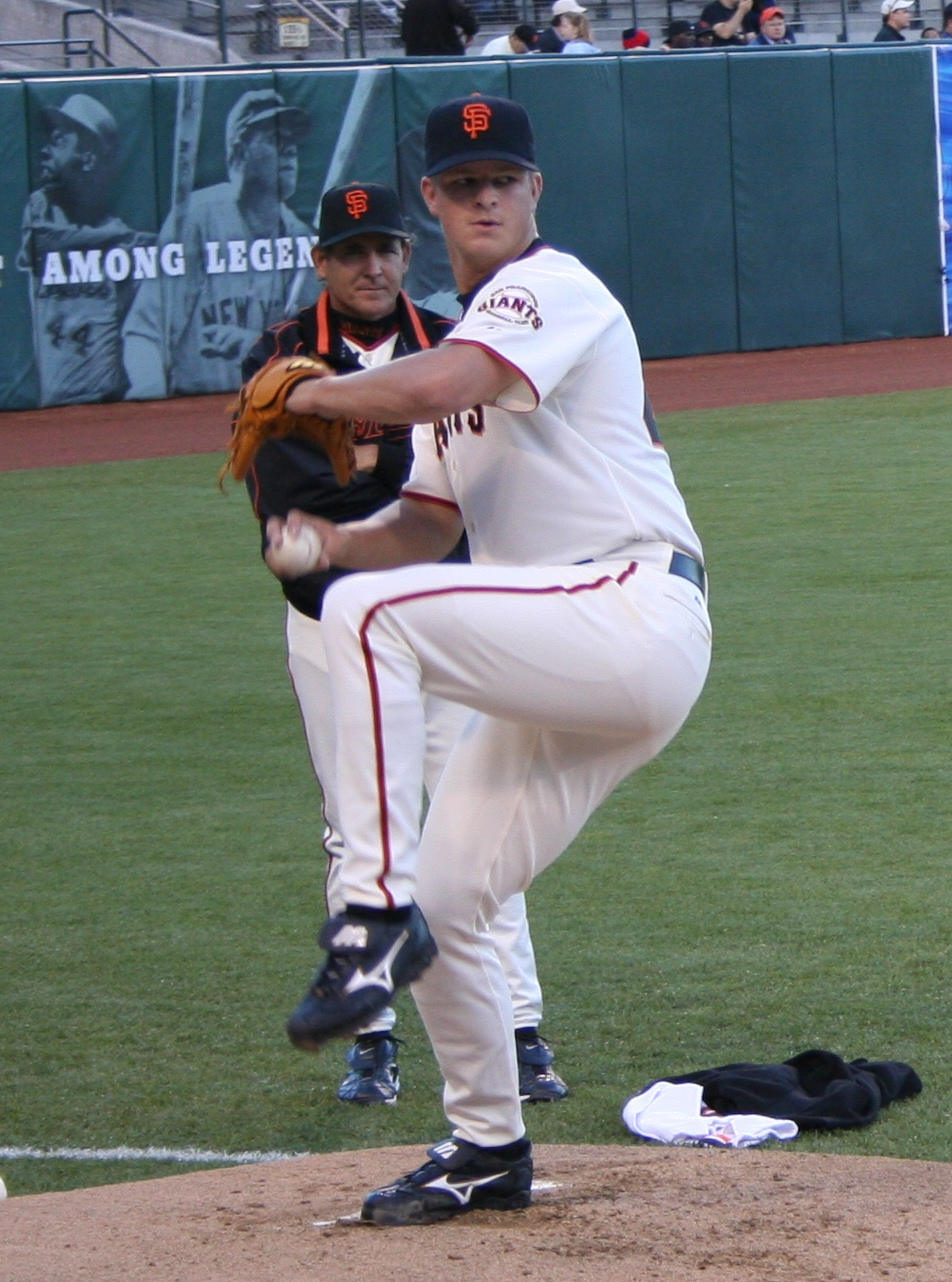
- Matt Cain in 2007
Houston Astros	San Francisco Giants
0	10
	1	2	3	4	5	6	7	8	9	R	H	E
Houston Astros	0	0	0	0	0	0	0	0	0	0	0	0
San Francisco Giants	2	3	2	1	2	0	0	0	X	10	15	0
- Date: June 13, 2012
- Venue: AT&T Park
- City: San Francisco, California
- Managers: Brad Mills (Houston Astros); Bruce Bochy (San Francisco Giants)
- Attendance: 42,298
- Television: Comcast SportsNet Bay Area
- TV announcers: Duane Kuiper (play-by-play/color commentary); Jon Miller (play-by-play/color commentary); Dave Flemming (play-by-play during middle innings)
- Radio: KNBR
- Radio announcers: Dave Flemming (play-by-play); Duane Kuiper (play-by-play during middle innings)

On June 13, 2012, Matt Cain of the San Francisco Giants pitched the 22nd perfect game in Major League Baseball (MLB) history and the first in Giants' franchise history. Prior to the game, Cain and professional golfer Dustin Johnson hit golf balls from home plate into McCovey Cove. Pitching against the Houston Astros at AT&T Park in San Francisco, California, Cain retired all 27 batters that he faced and tallied 14 strikeouts, tied for the most strikeouts in a perfect game with Sandy Koufax of the Los Angeles Dodgers in 1965. Following Philip Humber's perfect game earlier in 2012, Cain's performance marked just the third season in MLB history in which multiple perfect games were thrown. In June 1880, Lee Richmond and John Montgomery Ward both threw perfect games; in May 2010 Dallas Braden and Roy Halladay both accomplished the feat.

Two notable defensive plays by Cain's teammates kept the perfect game intact. Melky Cabrera made a running catch at the wall in left field in the top of the sixth inning, while Gregor Blanco made a diving catch in right-center field to start the top of the seventh.

It was the first Giants no-hitter since left-hander Jonathan Sánchez threw one on July 10, 2009, against the San Diego Padres at AT&T Park. The Astros were no-hit for the fifth time in franchise history, and the first time since Carlos Zambrano threw a no-hitter for the Chicago Cubs on September 14, 2008 at Miller Park (moved from Minute Maid Park because of Hurricane Ike). It was the second time the Astros were no-hit by the Giants; Juan Marichal did it on June 15, 1963. It was also the first time in Astros history that no one reached base safely.

Cain surpassed his previous personal best of 12 strikeouts in a single game, which he set in 2006. Cain's 125 pitches were the most thrown in a Major League perfect game. The Giants recorded 10 runs, the second most by any team in a perfect game after the New York Yankees who scored 11 runs during Domingo Germán's perfect game. By scoring a run in the 5th inning (Blanco home run), Cain became the only pitcher to have scored a run in his perfect game, a distinction which will likely stand in perpetuity following the National League's permanent adoption of the designated hitter beginning in the 2022 season.

The final out was made by Astros pinch-hitter Jason Castro, who hit his first career Major League home run off of Cain. Castro chopped a 1-2 pitch to third base where it was fielded deep behind the bag by third baseman Joaquin Arias. Arias successfully made the long throw across the diamond to first baseman Brandon Belt, who then tucked the ball in his back pocket before joining his teammates on the mound in celebration.

Duane Kuiper and Jon Miller (as Mike Krukow was absent) were announcing on Comcast SportsNet Bay Area while Dave Flemming was on KNBR. Kuiper and Flemming switched spots on TV and radio during the middle innings.

== Statistics ==
=== Linescore ===
Team	1	2	3	4	5	6	7	8	9	R	H	E
Houston Astros (26–36)	0	0	0	0	0	0	0	0	0	0	0	0
San Francisco Giants (36–27)	2	3	2	1	2	0	0	0	X	10	15	0
WP: Matt Cain (8–2) LP: J. A. Happ (4–7); Home runs: HOU: None; SF: Melky Cabrera (5), Brandon Belt (2), Gregor Blanco (4)

=== Box score ===
Houston	AB	R	H	RBI	BB	SO	AVG
Jordan Schafer, CF	3	0	0	0	0	2	.242
Jose Altuve, 2B	3	0	0	0	0	3	.321
Jed Lowrie, SS	3	0	0	0	0	1	.279
J. D. Martinez, LF	3	0	0	0	0	1	.226
Brett Wallace, 1B	3	0	0	0	0	3	.345
Chris Johnson, 3B	3	0	0	0	0	0	.280
Brian Bogusevic, RF	3	0	0	0	0	1	.224
Chris Snyder, C	3	0	0	0	0	1	.188
J. A. Happ, P	1	0	0	0	0	1	.087
Rhiner Cruz, P	0	0	0	0	0	0	.000
Brian Bixler, PH	1	0	0	0	0	1	.238
Xavier Cedeño, P	0	0	0	0	0	0	.000
Jason Castro, PH	1	0	0	0	0	0	.258
Totals	27	0	0	0	0	14	.000

FIELDING

- DP: Lowrie-Altuve-Wallace.

Houston	IP	H	R	ER	BB	SO	HR	ERA
J. A. Happ (L, 4–7)	3 1/3	11	8	8	1	5	2	5.33
Rhiner Cruz	1 2/3	2	2	2	1	0	1	7.40
Xavier Cedeño	3	2	0	0	0	1	0	2.45
Totals	8	15	10	10	2	6	3	11.25

San Francisco	AB	R	H	RBI	BB	SO	AVG
Gregor Blanco, RF	5	1	2	3	0	1	.280
Ryan Theriot, 2B	4	2	2	0	0	0	.260
Emmanuel Burriss, 2B	1	0	0	0	0	0	.213
Melky Cabrera, LF	5	2	2	2	0	1	.367
Buster Posey, C	5	1	2	0	0	0	.294
Ángel Pagán, CF	4	0	0	0	1	2	.315
Pablo Sandoval, 3B	4	1	3	2	0	0	.309
Brandon Crawford, SS	0	0	0	0	0	0	.226
Brandon Belt, 1B	3	1	2	3	1	1	.238
Joaquín Arias, SS-3B	3	1	1	0	0	0	.237
Matt Cain, P	3	1	1	0	0	1	.188
Totals	37	10	15	10	2	6	.405

BATTING

- 2B: Arias, Joa (4, Happ); Posey (13, Happ); Sandoval (7, Cedeno).
- HR: Cabrera, Me (5, 1st inning off Happ, 1 on, 1 out); Belt (2, 2nd inning off Happ, 1 on, 0 out); Blanco, G (4, 5th inning off Cruz, R, 1 on, 0 out)
- TB: Theriot 2; Sandoval 4; Cain, M; Blanco, G 5; Arias, Joa 2; Belt 5; Posey 3; Cabrera, Me 5.
- RBI: Cabrera, Me 2 (31); Belt 3 (22); Blanco, G 3 (15); Sandoval 2 (18).
- Runners left in scoring position, 2 out: Blanco, G 2; Arias, Joa 3.
- SAC: Cain, M.
- GIDP: Burriss.
- Team RISP: 2-for-10.
- Team LOB: 7.

San Francisco	IP	H	R	ER	BB	SO	HR	ERA
Matt Cain (W, 8–2)	9	0	0	0	0	14	0	2.18
Totals	9	0	0	0	0	14	0	0.00

=== Other info ===
- HBP: Arias, Joa (by Happ).
- Pitches-strikes: Happ 86–53; Cruz, R 28–15; Cedeno 40–29; Cain, M 125–86.
- Groundouts-flyouts: Happ 3–0; Cruz, R 3–1; Cedeno 6–1; Cain, M 6–6.
- Batters faced: Happ 23; Cruz, R 8; Cedeno 10; Cain, M 27.
- Inherited runners-scored: Cruz, R 3-1.
- Umpires: HP: Ted Barrett; 1B: Mike Muchlinski; 2B: Angel Campos; 3B: Brian Runge.
- Weather: 59 °F (15 °C), clear.
- Wind: 13 mph, Out to CF
- Time: 2:36
- Attendance: 42,298

=== Reactions ===
And this is hit out into the alleyway, a long run for [Gregor] Blanco, and Blanco's gonna dive, and he makes the catch! Just an unbelievable catch here in the seventh inning! It was unbelievable.

— Duane Kuiper calls Gregor Blanco's diving catch in the seventh inning on CSN Bay Area.

Here's the 3-2 pitch on the way. And it is driven to right center field, on the move Blanco, sprinting back, Gregor Blanco reaches out, DIVING, HE CAUGHT IT!

— Giants radio call of Blanco's diving catch in the seventh inning.

Cain appeared to look around. Gazing at the upper deck. But now looking into Buster Posey. One ball and two strikes. On the ground, [Joaquín] Arias, from deep third, got him! And that's a perfect game! And the Giants, mobbing Matt Cain on the pitcher's mound! What an unbelievable performance, by Matt Cain. That's the 22nd perfect game in Major League history. The last to do it was Philip Humber on April 21st of this year. And the first in the Giants franchise history.

— Kuiper television call on CSN Bay Area of the final out of the perfect game.

The 130th year of Giants baseball. Matt Cain, the first in all those many years, to pitch a perfect game.

— Jon Miller television call on CSN Bay Area after the perfect game.

I knew that I hadn't given up a hit early in the game, whether it was the third or fourth inning. But you (Amy G of CSN Bay Area) were the one that told me it was a perfect game. I had never thought about that.

— Cain, responding to a reporter's question about when he realized he had not allowed a baserunner.

== Aftermath ==
Cain's cleats, hat, uniform, dirt taken from the pitcher's mound, and a ball from the game will be included in an exhibit in the National Baseball Hall of Fame and Museum. All four umpires signed a game ball for Cain, and Belt gave Cain the ball used to record the final out.

According to Bill James' game score statistic, Cain's perfect game tied Sandy Koufax's perfect game for the most dominant modern-era perfect game.

Cain's perfect game would be the first of four no-hitters thrown by Giants pitching in four consecutive seasons, as Tim Lincecum would no-hit the San Diego Padres in both 2013 (in San Diego) and 2014 (in San Francisco), and Chris Heston would no-hit the New York Mets during his rookie season in 2015. Lincecum's first no-hitter came only eleven days after being the losing pitcher when the Giants were no-hit by Homer Bailey of the Cincinnati Reds.

== See also ==
- List of Major League Baseball no-hitters
