= Thieriot =

Thieriot or Thiériot is a surname. Notable people with the surname include:

- Ferdinand Thieriot (1838–1919), German composer
- Jean-Louis Thiériot (born 1969), French politician
- Max Thieriot (born 1988), American actor and director

== See also ==
- Theriot
