= Justin Christian =

American baseball player (born 1980)

- Outfielder
- Born: April 3, 1980 (age 46); Lincoln, Nebraska, U.S.
- Batted: Right Threw: Right

MLB debut
- June 24, 2008, for the New York Yankees

Last MLB appearance
- September 30, 2012, for the San Francisco Giants

MLB statistics
- Batting average: .203
- Home runs: 0
- Runs batted in: 12
- Stats at Baseball Reference

Teams
- New York Yankees (2008); San Francisco Giants (2011–2012)

Justin Barnett Christian (born April 3, 1980) is an American former professional baseball outfielder. He played in Major League Baseball (MLB) for the New York Yankees in 2008 and the San Francisco Giants in 2011 and 2012.

== Career ==
=== Amateur career ===
Christian attended Borel Middle School in San Mateo and then attended Aragon High School in San Mateo, California from 1995–98, where he played varsity baseball all four years for John Arents and later Mike Trimble.

He began his college baseball career with two years at Skyline College where he was All-Conference for both years. He took the scholarship he had earned to Auburn University in Auburn, Alabama, but transferred after missing most of the 2002 season with a torn labrum to Southeast Missouri State University, where he became an All-American and was voted "Newcomer of the Year." At Skyline he was a shortstop, but was moved to second base at Auburn. He was mostly an infielder at SEMO as well.

=== River City Rascals ===
After going undrafted in the 2003 Major League Baseball draft, he signed with the River City Rascals of the Frontier League, winning the starting second base job and playing 30 games during the 2003 season.

In the fall of 2003, he went back to Auburn as a student assistant coach while trying to set up scout workouts; he set up several of these but was unsuccessful in getting signed.

He returned to the Rascals for the 2004 season, where he hit .450 with 26 steals in 30 games.

=== New York Yankees ===
The New York Yankees signed him sight unseen. In 2004, he played on the Gulf Coast League Yankees and the Staten Island Yankees.

He started the 2005 season with the Charleston RiverDogs, where he hit .290 and was promoted to the Tampa Yankees, where he hit .306. He ended the season with a combined 55 stolen bases.

In 2006, Christian hit .276 with six home runs, 43 RBI and 68 stolen bases, third in all of the minor leagues. He started the 2007 season with the Double-A Trenton Thunder, batting .235 with three home runs, 32 RBI and 18 stolen bases. On June 22, 2007, he was called up to Triple-A Scranton/Wilkes-Barre where he hit .325, and .271 overall, for the year.

On June 24, 2008, he was promoted to the Yankees' major league roster preceding their interleague series with the Pittsburgh Pirates. He started the same day, going 2-for-4 with a double and two RBI in his major league debut.

On July 8, 2008, he stole his first base in the major leagues, stealing third base off Tampa Bay Rays relief pitcher Grant Balfour and catcher Dioner Navarro. The only two times he was caught stealing, he had fallen down between first and second base or had been leading far off first.

Following the 2008 season, Christian was non-tendered by the Yankees, making him a free agent.

=== Baltimore Orioles ===
Christian was signed to a minor league contract by the Baltimore Orioles on January 13, 2009. He made 88 appearances for the Triple-A Norfolk Tides, batting .270/.310/.374 with three home runs, 25 RBI, and 26 stolen bases.

=== New York Yankees (second stint) ===
On May 7, 2010, Christian was re-signed by the Yankees while playing for the Southern Maryland Blue Crabs in the independent Atlantic League, and was assigned to the Double-A Trenton Thunder, where he broke Kevin Thompson's franchise record for stolen bases and was re-promoted to Triple-A Scranton/Wilkes-Barre on September 6.

=== San Francisco Giants ===
On February 5, 2011, Christian signed a minor league contract with the reigning World Series champion San Francisco Giants. On September 6, the Giants purchased his contract and he was called up to the major league squad. Christian started 2012 with the Triple-A Fresno Grizzlies, and ended up splitting the season with them and the Giants. With Fresno, he hit .343/.409/.508 with seven home runs, 35 RBI and 12 stolen bases. With San Francisco, he hit .125/.197/.143 with two RBI and two stolen bases. Christian won a World Series ring as a member of the 2012 Giants.

=== St. Louis Cardinals ===
On November 26, 2012, Christian signed a minor league contract with the St. Louis Cardinals that included an invitation to spring training. He was projected to be starting outfielder for the Cardinals' Triple-A Memphis Redbirds affiliate.

=== Tampa Bay Rays ===
Christian signed a minor league contract with the Tampa Bay Rays on January 14, 2014. He made 127 appearances for the Triple-A Durham Bulls, batting .271/.344/.434 with 10 home runs, 37 RBI, and 16 stolen bases.

=== Tigres de Quintana Roo ===
On February 6, 2015, Christian signed with the Tigres de Quintana Roo of the Mexican League. In 27 appearances for the team, he hit .223/.292/.350 with three home runs, six RBI, and seven stolen bases. Christian was released by Quintana Roo on May 8.

=== Diablos Rojos del México ===
On May 12, 2015, Christian signed with the Diablos Rojos del México of the Mexican League. He made 18 appearances for the team, slashing .328/.436/.391 with five RBI and one stolen base. Christian was released by the Diablos on June 6.

== Life after baseball ==
Christian is currently a Deputy Sheriff with the Santa Clara County Sheriff's Office in San Jose, California.
