= Mike Muchlinski =

American baseball umpire (born 1977)

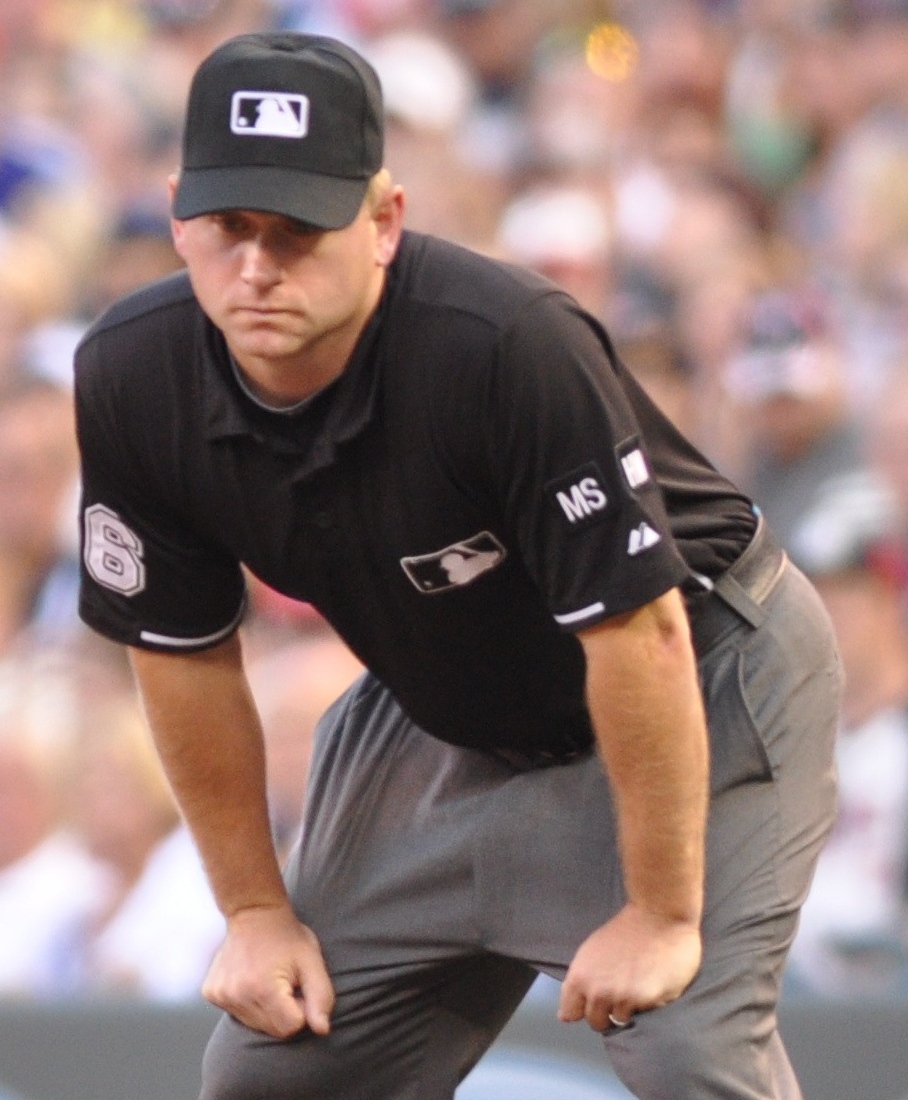
- Muchlinski in 2012

MLB – No. 76
- Umpire
- Born: February 26, 1977 (age 49); Tacoma, Washington, U.S.

MLB debut
- April 24, 2006

Crew information
- Umpiring crew: B
- Crew members: #88 Doug Eddings (crew chief); #76 Mike Muchlinski; #47 Gabe Morales; #82 Emil Jímenez

Career highlights and awards
- Special assignments: World Series (2021); League Championship Series (2019, 2022, 2023, 2024); Division Series (2016, 2018, 2021); Wild Card Games/Series (2020, 2022, 2023, 2025); All-Star Games (2018)

Michael William Muchlinski (/mʊˈlɪnskiː/; born February 26, 1977) is an American Major League Baseball umpire. He umpired his first Major League game on April 24, 2006, and was officially hired by MLB prior to the 2014 season. He attended the University of Washington, and was a member of Delta Tau Delta fraternity.

== Umpiring career ==
Muchlinski officiated behind the plate on August 5, 2011, for a benches-clearing brawl between the Philadelphia Phillies and the San Francisco Giants. He ejected Phillies center fielder Shane Victorino, Giants catcher Eli Whiteside, and Giants pitcher Ramón Ramírez from the game.

Muchlinski was the first base umpire on June 13, 2012, when Giants pitcher Matt Cain threw a perfect game against the Houston Astros.

Muchlinski was the home plate umpire on June 20, 2015, when Washington Nationals pitcher Max Scherzer pitched a no-hitter against the Pittsburgh Pirates. Scherzer had a perfect game with two outs in the ninth inning and a 2–2 count on José Tábata. Tábata appeared to lean into Scherzer's eighth pitch of the at bat, controversially ruled a hit by pitch by Muchlinski.

== See also ==
- List of Major League Baseball umpires (disambiguation)
