= Steve Edlefsen =

American baseball player

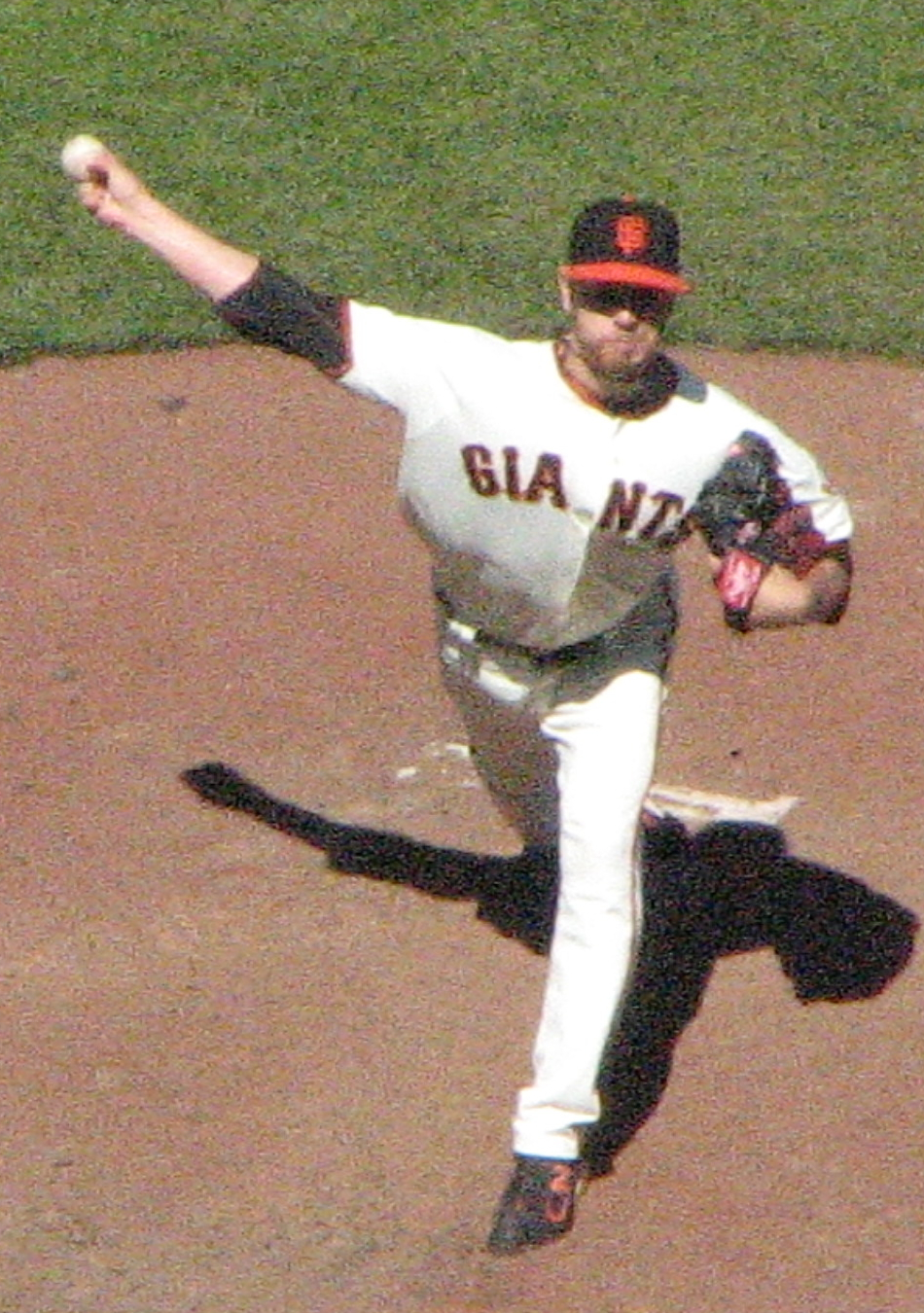
- Edlefsen with the San Francisco Giants
- Relief pitcher
- Born: June 27, 1985 (age 41); Bloomington, Minnesota, U.S.
- Batted: Switch Threw: Right

MLB debut
- August 21, 2011, for the San Francisco Giants

Last MLB appearance
- June 8, 2012, for the San Francisco Giants

MLB statistics
- Win–loss record: 0–1
- Earned run average: 6.75
- Strikeouts: 15
- Stats at Baseball Reference

Teams
- San Francisco Giants (2011–2012)

Steven Bradley Edlefsen (born June 27, 1985) is an American former professional baseball relief pitcher who played for the San Francisco Giants in Major League Baseball between 2011 and 2012.

Prior to playing professionally, Edlefsen attended Jefferson High School in Bloomington, Minnesota and then Barton County Community College and the University of Nebraska–Lincoln. He was originally drafted by the Boston Red Sox in the 41st round of the 2004 amateur draft, however he did not sign. He was then drafted by the San Francisco Giants in the 16th round of the 2007 amateur draft, beginning his professional career that season.

== Professional career ==
=== San Francisco Giants ===
Edlefsen pitched for the Salem-Keizer Volcanoes in 2007, going 2–0 with a 1.62 ERA in 18 appearances. In 2008, he pitched for the San Jose Giants, going 8–5 with a 3.36 ERA in 40 games. He split 2009 between the San Jose Giants, Connecticut Defenders and Fresno Grizzlies and went 8–1 with nine saves and a 1.95 ERA, striking out 72 batters in 69 1/3 innings. In 2010, he pitched for the Grizzlies and went 7–2 with a 2.38 ERA in 49 games.

On August 21, 2011, Edlefsen was called up to the Majors for the first time. He made his debut that day with 1 1/3 scoreless innings against the Houston Astros. On the season he pitched 11 1/3 innings over 13 games with a 9.53 ERA.

He also split 2012 between the Majors and minors, appearing in 14 games for the Giants with an 0–1 record and 4.70 ERA over 15 1/3 innings.

Edlefsen spent all of 2013 in AAA with the Grizzlies and was 2–2 with a 6.28 ERA in 47 games. He became a free agent after the season.

=== Los Angeles Dodgers ===
Edlefsen attended an open try-out with the Los Angeles Dodgers on February 27, 2014, and was signed to a minor league contract. He had an 11.88 ERA in 6 games for the Isotopes before announcing his retirement on April 21, 2014.

== Pitching style ==
Edlefsen's pitch repertoire consists of a sinker (89-92 mph), a slider (78-82), and a periodic changeup to lefties (77-80).
