= Francisco Peguero =

Dominican baseball player (born 1988)

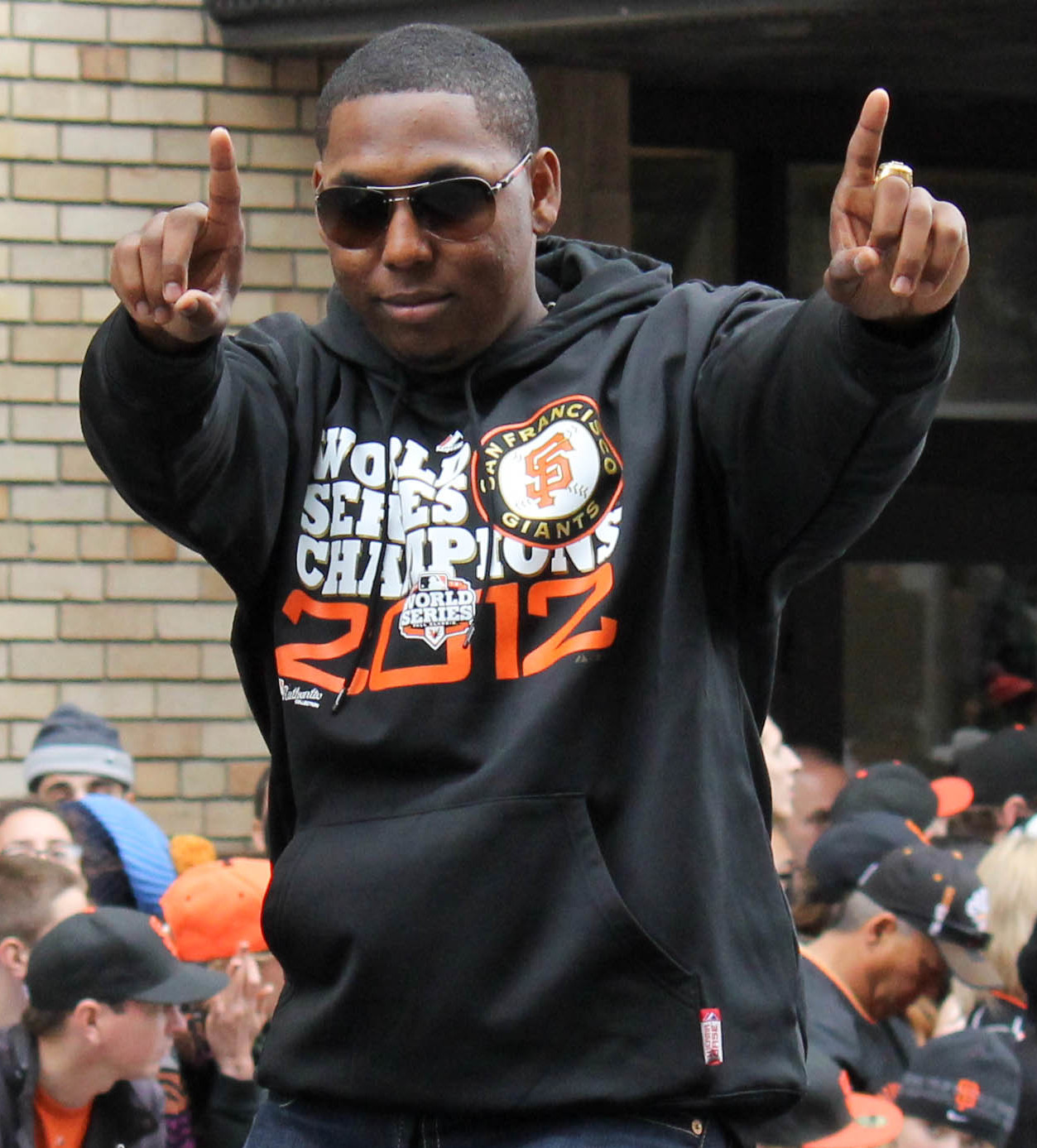
- Peguero at the 2012 World Series victory parade

Free agent
- Outfielder
- Born: June 1, 1988 (age 38); Nigua, Dominican Republic
- Bats: Right Throws: Right

MLB debut
- August 25, 2012, for the San Francisco Giants

MLB statistics (through 2013 season)
- Batting average: .200
- Home runs: 1
- Runs batted in: 1
- Stats at Baseball Reference

Teams
- San Francisco Giants (2012–2013)

Francisco Peguero Báez (born June 1, 1988) is a Dominican professional baseball outfielder who is a currently free agent. He has previously played in Major League Baseball (MLB) for the San Francisco Giants during 2012 and 2013.

== Professional career ==
=== San Francisco Giants ===
Peguero began his professional career in 2006, playing for the Dominican Summer League Giants, hitting .275 with four home runs and 16 RBI in 56 games. He played for the DSL Giants in 2007 as well, hitting .294 with 25 stolen bases in 69 games.

In 2008, Peguero played for two teams - the Salem-Keizer Volcanoes and Augusta Greenjackets. That season, he hit a combined .285 with four home runs, 43 RBI and 25 stolen bases in 100 games.

He spent 2009 with the Volcanoes and Greenjackets, hitting .353 with one home run, 46 RBI and 22 stolen bases in 75 games.

Peguero got a late start this season after an injury in spring training. He batted .324 with the San Jose Giants before joining the Richmond Flying Squirrels on June 23, where he has played 71 games with a .309 average, 5 home runs, 37 RBI, 34 runs scored and 8 stolen bases.

In 2012, Peguero played for the Triple-A Fresno Grizzlies. In August he had a 22-game hitting streak. On August 25, 2012, Peguero was called up to the major leagues for the first time and made his major league debut, starting and playing left field in a game against the Atlanta Braves. He got his first major league base hit September 23 with an infield single in the 4th inning against the San Diego Padres.

Peguero was designated for assignment on November 27, 2013. He became a free agent on December 2, after being non-tendered by the Giants.

=== Baltimore Orioles ===
On December 7, 2013, Peguero signed a one-year, $550,000 contract with the Baltimore Orioles. He began the 2014 season on the disabled list with right wrist tendinitis. On June 23, 2014, Peguero was removed from the 40-man roster and sent outright to the Triple-A Norfolk Tides. In 78 appearances for Norfolk, he batted .273/.306/.362 with three home runs, 33 RBI, and four stolen bases. Peguero became a free agent following the season.

=== Tigres de Quintana Roo ===
On February 13, 2015, Peguero signed with the Tigres de Quintana Roo of the Mexican Baseball League. In 98 games he hit .294/.341/.488 with 16 home runs, 79 RBI, and four stolen bases.

=== Acereros de Monclova ===
On October 21, 2015, Peguero was traded to the Acereros de Monclova of the Mexican League. In 106 games for Monclova in 2016, he slashed .311/.357/.482 with 15 home runs, 64 RBI, and seven stolen bases. Peguero was released on February 21, 2017.

=== Toyama GRN Thunderbirds ===
On March 6, 2017, he signed with the Toyama GRN Thunderbirds of the Baseball Challenge League. On September 10, he broke the league's single–season hit record of 113, set by Yuya Nohara in 2007, getting his 114th.

=== Chiba Lotte Marines ===
On February 16, 2018, he signed with Chiba Lotte Marines of Nippon Professional Baseball (NPB). He played 50 games with the farm team, before he was placed on waivers on June 29.

=== Acereros de Monclova (second stint) ===
On June 29, 2018, Peguero signed with the Acereros de Monclova of the Mexican League. He appeared in 52 games for Monclova down the stretch, hitting .368/.416/.637 with 13 home runs and 60 RBI. Peguero played in 115 games for the Acereros in 2019, slashing .370/.430/.613 with 38 home runs, 133 RBI, and 9 stolen bases. Peguero did not play in a game in 2020 due to the cancellation of the Mexican League season because of the COVID-19 pandemic.

Peguero did not play for the team in 2021 after suffering a wrist fracture, and saw sparse action in 2022 due to injury. In just 38 games that season, he hit .262/.356/.454 with 6 home runs and 23 RBI.

=== Piratas de Campeche ===
On June 13, 2023, Peguero was loaned to the Piratas de Campeche of the Mexican League for the remainder of the season. In 36 games, Peguero batted .311/.333/.400 with 3 home runs and 25 RBI.

=== Olmecas de Tabasco ===
On April 1, 2024, Peguero signed with the Olmecas de Tabasco of the Mexican League. In 73 appearances for Tabasco, he hit .297/.336/.455 with 10 home runs and 54 RBI.

In 2025, he returned for a second season with Tabasco. In 12 games he hit .239/.271/.326 with 1 home run and 2 RBIs. He became a free agent following the season.

== See also ==
- List of Major League Baseball players with a home run in their final major league at bat
