= Mike Fontenot =

American baseball player (born 1980)

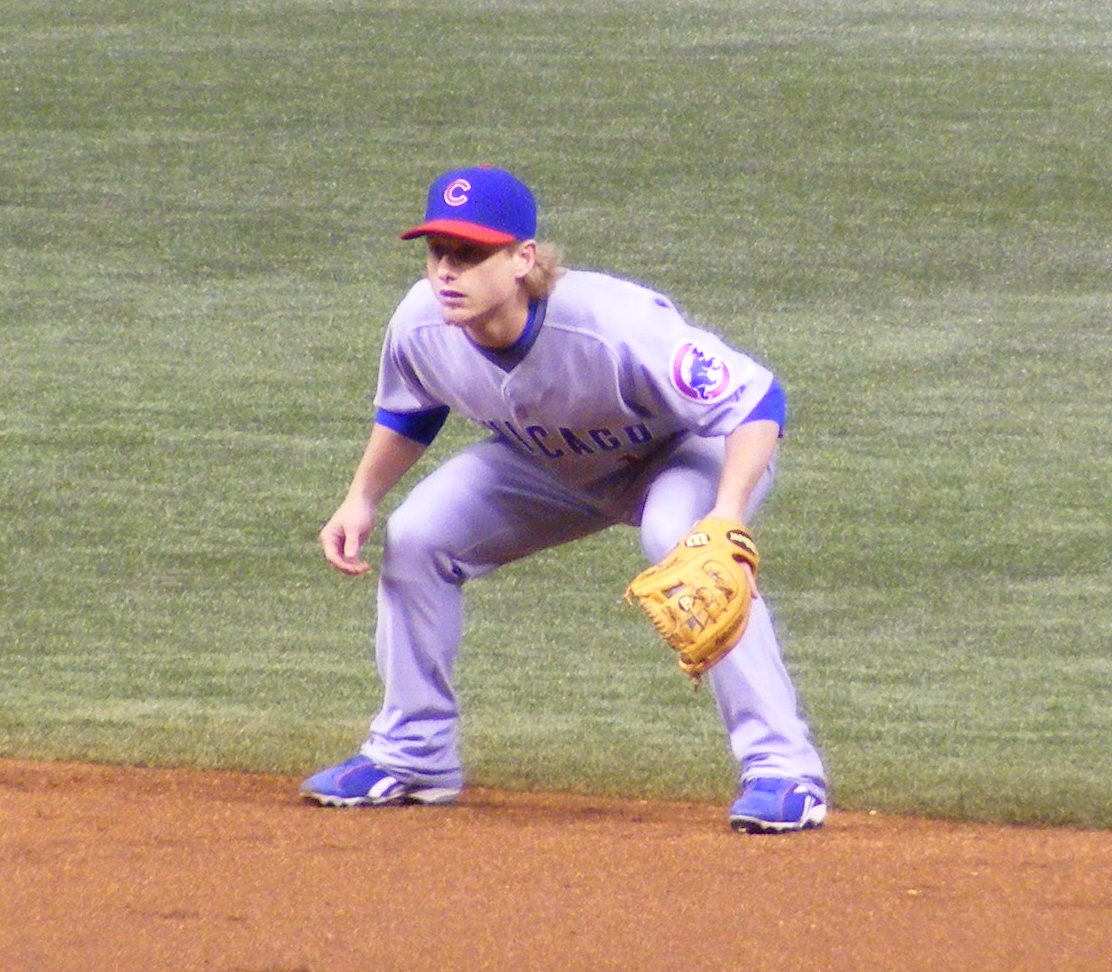
- Fontenot with the Chicago Cubs in 2008
- Infielder
- Born: June 9, 1980 (age 46); Slidell, Louisiana, U.S.
- Batted: Left Threw: Right

MLB debut
- April 13, 2005, for the Chicago Cubs

Last MLB appearance
- July 29, 2012, for the Philadelphia Phillies

MLB statistics
- Batting average: .265
- Home runs: 27
- Runs batted in: 163
- Stats at Baseball Reference

Teams
- Chicago Cubs (2005, 2007–2010); San Francisco Giants (2010–2011); Philadelphia Phillies (2012)

Career highlights and awards
- World Series champion (2010)

Michael Eugene Fontenot Jr. (/ˌfɑːntɛnoʊ/; born June 9, 1980) is an American former professional baseball infielder who played in Major League Baseball (MLB) for the Chicago Cubs, San Francisco Giants, and Philadelphia Phillies. He batted left-handed and threw right-handed. Fontenot was commonly used at second base, shortstop, or third base during his career. He won a World Series with the Giants in 2010.

Fontenot grew up in Louisiana. He attended Louisiana State University (LSU) and was a member of the LSU Tigers team that won the 2000 College World Series. After two years of college baseball, he was a first round draft pick of the Baltimore Orioles in 2002. Named the organization's Minor League Player of the Year in 2003, Fontenot never played in the major leagues for Baltimore, as he was included in a 2005 trade with the Cubs that sent Sammy Sosa to Baltimore. Fontenot debuted briefly with the Cubs in 2005, but it was not until 2007 that he reached the major leagues full time. He batted .305 while primarily used as a bench player in 2008 and began 2009 as the Cubs' starting second baseman. However, Fontenot lost the role after batting only .230 through August 7. He was traded to the Giants in 2010, becoming part of the team's first World Series victory since 1954.

In 2011, Fontenot was receiving starting time in May due to an injury to Pablo Sandoval, but he missed a few weeks himself with a left groin injury. He was released by the Giants before the 2012 season but was signed by the Phillies. Joining the team in May, he batted .289 in 47 games before getting released in August. He spent 2013 and 2014 with the Durham Bulls, the Triple-A affiliate of the Tampa Bay Rays.

== Early life ==
Michael Eugene Fontenot Jr., was born on June 9, 1980, in Slidell, Louisiana, where he grew up. He was the oldest of four children of Mike Sr. and Lisa Lauren Fontenot. Two of his younger siblings, Christopher and Seth, are brothers, and the third is his younger sister, Jennifer. According to Fontenot, his father was the person who most influenced him as an athlete.

Fontenot was a standout for Salmen High School in Slidell, Louisiana, lettering in baseball in each of his four years there. He made the 1st All-State Team each of those years, as well as the All-Metro team. In his freshman year (1996), he batted .445 as Salmen won the state championship. As a senior, he batted .556, recording 38 runs scored, 13 doubles, two triples, 13 home runs, 42 runs batted in (RBIs), and 18 stolen bases. For his efforts, he was named the most valuable player (MVP) of the St. Tammany Parish, the district, and the All-Metro region. His four-year totals with Salmen included a .535 batting average, 139 runs scored, 35 doubles, 11 triples, 30 home runs, 128 RBIs, and 57 stolen bases. In addition to baseball, Fontenot played football, lettering twice. He was used on the gridiron as a return specialist, defensive back, and wide receiver.

After his senior year, Fontenot was drafted in the 21st round (625th overall) of the 1999 Major League Baseball (MLB) Draft by the Tampa Bay Devil Rays, but chose to attend Louisiana State University (LSU) on a baseball scholarship instead of going professional.

== College career ==
As a freshman at LSU, Fontenot was the everyday second baseman for the Tigers. He batted .353 with 93 runs scored, 103 hits, 13 doubles, three triples, 17 home runs, 64 RBIs, and eight stolen bases. At the time, the 17 home runs were the most by an LSU freshman, breaking Blair Barbier's 1997 record of 15. For his contributions, Fontenot was named the National Freshman of the Year by the Southeastern Conference; The Sporting News; and Collegiate Baseball, which declared him a co-winner. Baseball America named him a First-Team Freshman All-American.

Fontenot was a part of the NCAA team that played well enough during the season to advance to the Baton Rouge Regional. He batted .400 with five runs scored, two doubles, one home run, and five RBIs, earning all-tournament team honors as one of the best ballplayers in the regional. Along with future Chicago Cubs teammate Ryan Theriot, Fontenot was a member of the LSU Tigers baseball team that won the 2000 College World Series. In the NCAA Baseball Tournament, Fontenot recorded a team-high batting average of .432 with four doubles, two home runs, and nine RBIs. LSU advanced to the College World Series, and Fontenot again led the team in average (.462), also recording two doubles, one home run, two RBIs, and six runs scored as the Tigers won the championship. For his efforts, Fontenot was selected to the College World Series all-tournament team.

In 2000, between his freshman and sophomore seasons, he played collegiate summer baseball with the Wareham Gatemen of the Cape Cod Baseball League, and was named the league's MVP.

Before Fontenot's sophomore season of 2001, Baseball America named him one of the top prospects in the country, and the Southeastern Conference named him a pre-season All-Star. Fontenot was the First-Team All Southeastern Conference (SEC) selection at second base. He batted .339 for the Tigers with 64 runs scored, 13 doubles, 14 home runs, and 50 RBIs. Behind his contributions, the Tigers posted a team batting average of .318, tops in the SEC. Though they did not win the College World Series this time, they did win an SEC Western Division title.

== Professional career ==
=== Draft and minor leagues ===
Though he had only played two years of college baseball, Fontenot's age made him eligible for the 2001 MLB draft. Deciding to enter it, Fontenot was chosen in the first round (19th overall) by the Baltimore Orioles. He signed with the team and was given a $1,300,000.00 signing bonus.

Fontenot began his minor league career with the Frederick Keys of the Single-A advanced Carolina League in 2002. In 122 games, he batted .264 with 127 hits, eight home runs, and 53 RBIs. In 2003, he played for the Bowie Baysox of the Double-A Eastern League. In 126 games, he batted .325 (second in the league to Alex Ríos's .352) with 146 hits (ninth), 12 home runs, and 66 RBIs. He was named the Orioles' Minor League Player of the Year, in addition to being named an Eastern League postseason All-Star.

Promoted to Triple-A in 2004, Fontenot played for the Ottawa Lynx of the International League. In 136 games (tied with Earl Snyder for fourth in the league behind Bry Nelson's 142, Víctor Díaz's 141, and Jhonny Peralta's 138), he batted .279 with 146 hits, eight home runs, 49 RBIs, and 10 triples (tied for second in the league with John Rodriguez and Pete Orr behind Mark Budzinski's 15).

Entering the 2005 season, Baseball America ranked Fontenot the seventh-best prospect in the Orioles' organization. However, Fontenot would never play a game for the Orioles. On February 3, 2005, he was traded to the Chicago Cubs along with second baseman/outfielder Jerry Hairston Jr. and right-handed pitcher Dave Crouthers for outfielder Sammy Sosa.

Fontenot started the 2005 season with the Iowa Cubs of the Triple-A Pacific Coast League, but he was called up to the major leagues on April 11 after Todd Walker went on the disabled list due to a sprained left knee.

=== Chicago Cubs (2005, 2007–2010) ===
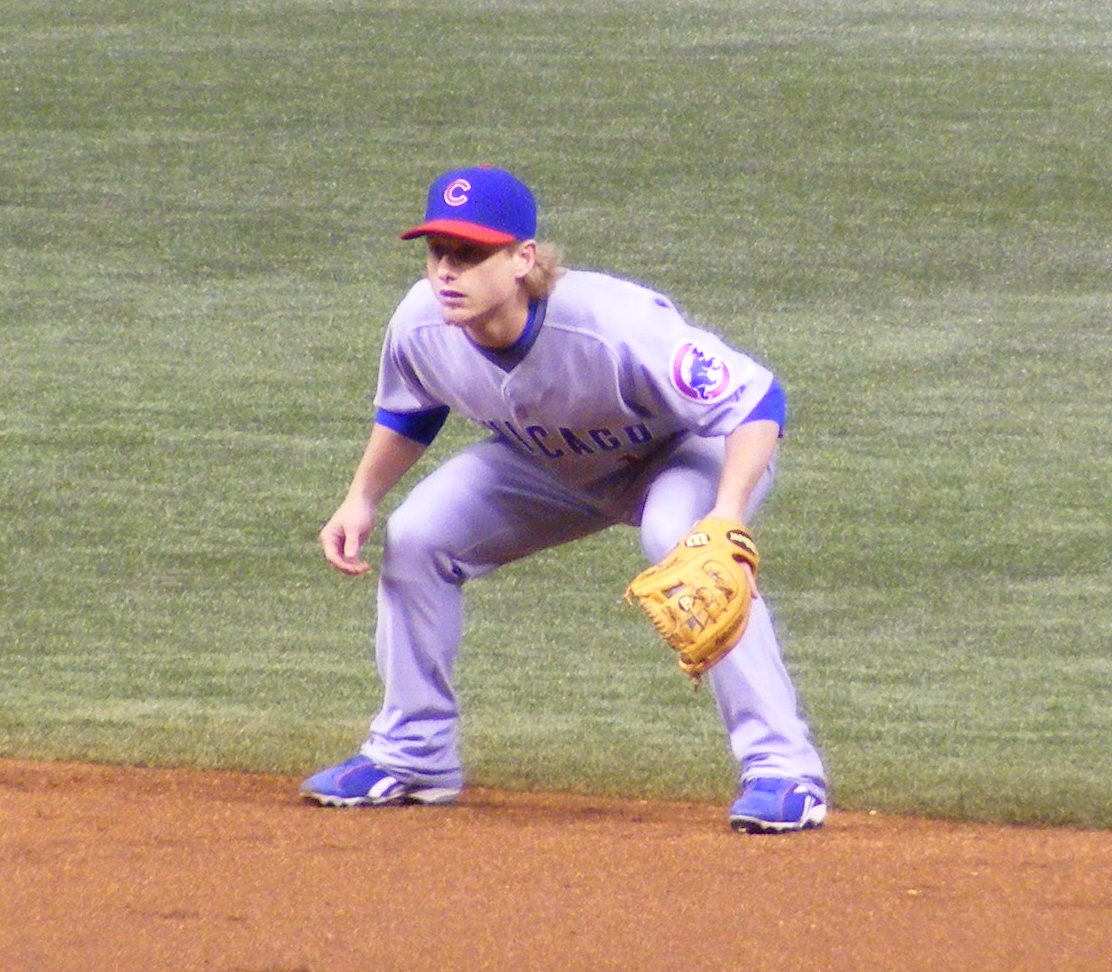
Fontenot at Tropicana Field in 2008

He made his major league debut in the first game of a doubleheader on April 13, 2005, pinch-running for Aramis Ramírez and scoring a run in the team's 8–3 loss to the San Diego Padres. Fontenot played in four games with the club (pinch-hitting in the other three) before getting sent back to Iowa on April 23 to make room for Ben Grieve on the roster. He was also called up on May 13 and played three further games for Chicago, pinch-hitting in two and pinch-running in one, before getting sent back to Iowa on May 20 when pitcher Joe Borowski came off the disabled list. In seven games with Chicago in 2005, he had no hits in two at bats (0-for-2) with two walks and four runs scored. At Iowa, he played 111 games, batting .272 with 60 runs scored, 103 hits, six home runs, and 39 RBIs. In 2006, Fontenot spent the entire season with Iowa, batting .296 with 107 hits, eight home runs, and 36 RBIs in 111 games.

Chicago did not invite Fontenot to spring training in 2007, and he started the year with Iowa once again. He did not return to the Cubs until May 15, 2007, when he was promoted from Iowa to replace relief pitcher Rocky Cherry. Pinch-hitting against the New York Mets on May 15, he got his first major league hit, a double against Ambiorix Burgos in Chicago's 10–1 triumph. He also pinch-hit against the Mets on May 17 before getting sent back to Iowa the following day to make room for Carlos Mármol on the roster. In 55 games for Iowa in 2007, he batted .336 with 46 runs scored, 71 hits, six home runs, and 34 RBIs.

Fontenot received more playing time on his next callup. After Aramis Ramírez suffered left patellar tendonitis in June, Fontenot was called up on June 9 (his birthday) to become Chicago's everyday second baseman, as Mark DeRosa moved over to third base to replace Ramírez. He hit his first major league home run against Buddy Carlyle on June 10, in a 5–4 loss to the Atlanta Braves. On June 24, Fontenot had five hits in five at bats in Chicago's 10–9 victory over the Colorado Rockies. The next day, he had hits in his first two at bats, tying Sammy Sosa's Chicago record of most consecutive at bats with a hit. Fontenot had hits in 19 of the 20 games he played in June, leading National League (NL) players with a .397 average for the month and finishing second in the NL Rookie of the Month voting to Ryan Braun. After the month of June, he only batted .214 for the rest of the season, losing the starting second base job to DeRosa in mid-August. In 86 games (234 at bats) his rookie year, Fontenot batted .278 with 32 runs scored, 65 hits, three home runs, and 29 RBIs. Winners of the NL Central, the Cubs faced the Arizona Diamondbacks in the NL Division Series (NLDS). Fontenot pinch-hit twice in the series, going hitless as the Diamondbacks swept the Cubs in three games.

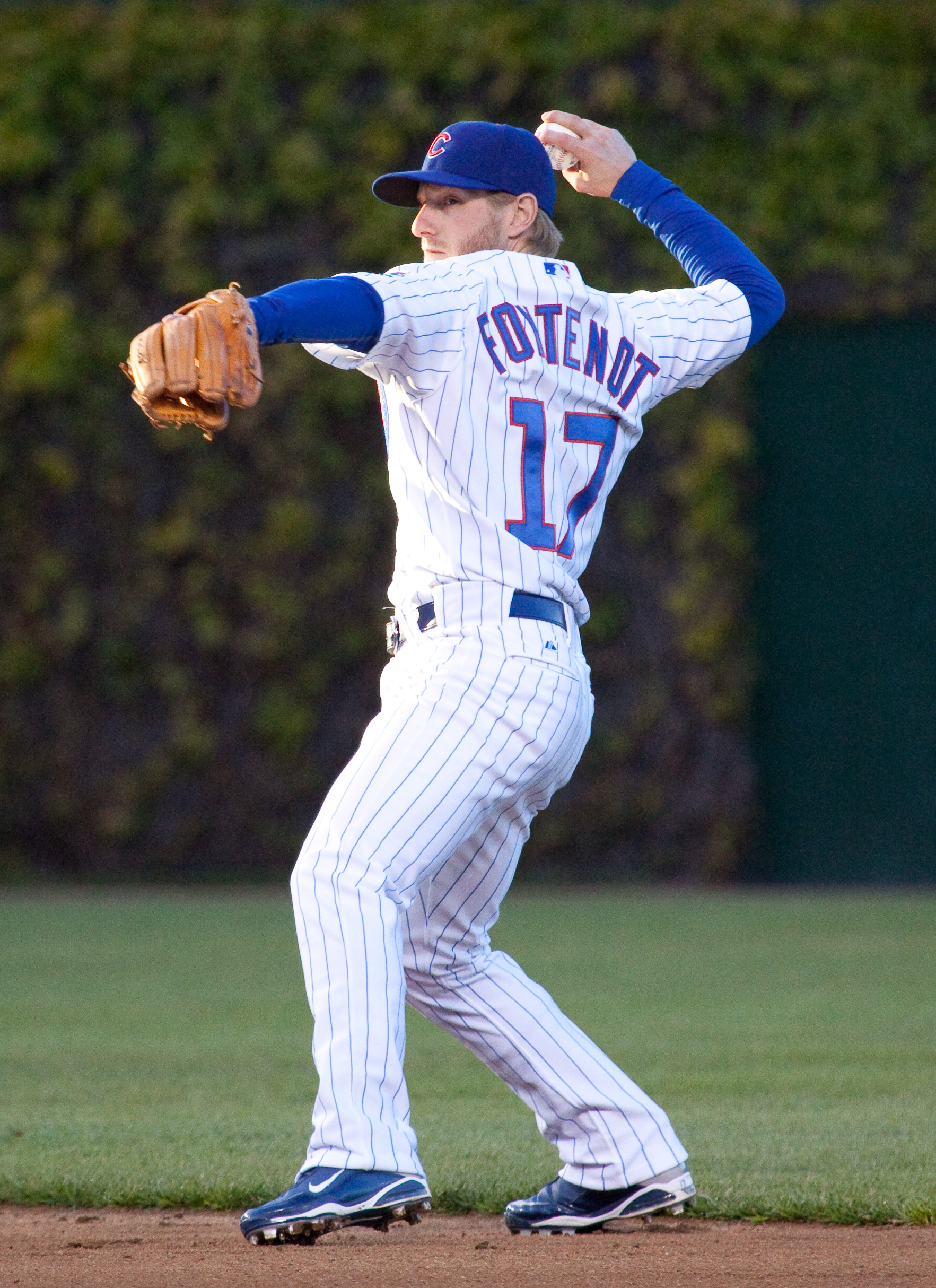
Fontenot at Wrigley Field in 2010.

Though used mostly as a bench player in 2008, Fontenot also started 49 games, many of which were in June and July while Alfonso Soriano was on the disabled list. On May 3, he had three hits and set a career high with four RBIs, including a three-run home run against Kyle Lohse in a 9–3 victory over the St. Louis Cardinals. He made it to first base in 14 straight games from June 25 through July 18. Fontenot hit home runs in consecutive games against the Cincinnati Reds on July 8 and 10. Following the All-Star Break, Fontenot batted .360. He had the first pinch-hit home run of his career on August 28 against Ryan Madson, starting a five-run rally for the Cubs in their eventual 6–4 triumph over the Philadelphia Phillies. In 119 games (243 at bats), he batted .305 with 42 runs scored, 74 hits, nine home runs, and 40 RBIs. For the second year in a row, the Cubs won the NL Central. This time, Fontenot played every game of the NLDS against the Los Angeles Dodgers, even starting at second base in Game 3. He had two hits in six at bats, but the Cubs were swept by the Dodgers.

Entering the 2009 season, the Cubs traded DeRosa and signed infielder Aaron Miles to a two-year contract. However, manager Lou Piniella named Fontenot the team's starting second baseman on March 14 during spring training. Though Fontenot began the year at second base, he also started several games at third base while Ramírez was recovering from various injuries. On April 8, he had four RBIs, including a three-run home run against Russ Ortiz in an 11–6 victory over the Houston Astros. He hit home runs in consecutive games against the Diamondbacks on April 27 and 28. On his birthday (June 9), he had a season-high four hits and an RBI in a 7–1 victory over the Astros. After batting .230 through August 7, Fontenot lost his position as the Cubs everyday second baseman, splitting time with Jeff Baker for the rest of the year. Though not a starter in September, he batted .317, his highest average of any month. The 2009 season was a year of career highs for Fontenot in games (135), at bats (377), hits (89), home runs (nine, same as in 2008), and RBIs (43). He also scored 38 runs. Though the Cubs had a winning record at 83–78, they finished second to the Cardinals in the NL Central, missing the playoffs. In addition serving as an infielder for the Cubs in 2009, Fontenot played himself in the TBS comedy My Boys. He appeared in the final episode of the show's third season, entitled "Spring Training."

After the 2009 season, Fontenot barely became eligible for salary arbitration. Under MLB's collective bargaining agreement, the 17 percent of players with the most playing time in at least two MLB seasons but not three full seasons were eligible. Fontenot was in a tie for the last spot with Adam Jones and Micah Owings, but he won the tiebreaker because he played more games in 2008 than the other two. Ultimately, Fontenot avoided arbitration by settling for a $1 million contract on January 19, 2010. He got the bulk of the starts at second base to begin the 2010 season. On May 7, Fontenot hit his first career grand slam against the Reds. It came in the eighth inning off the first pitch from Carlos Fisher, with the Cubs up 10–4. However, the Cubs called up shortstop prospect Starlin Castro from the minor leagues that day, and Fontenot's playing time became much scarcer as Ryan Theriot was shifted to second base to accommodate Castro. On August 11, Fontenot was traded to the San Francisco Giants for Evan Crawford. In 75 games (169 at bats) with the Cubs, he had batted .284 with 14 runs scored, 48 hits, one home run, and 20 RBIs.

=== San Francisco Giants (2010–2011) ===
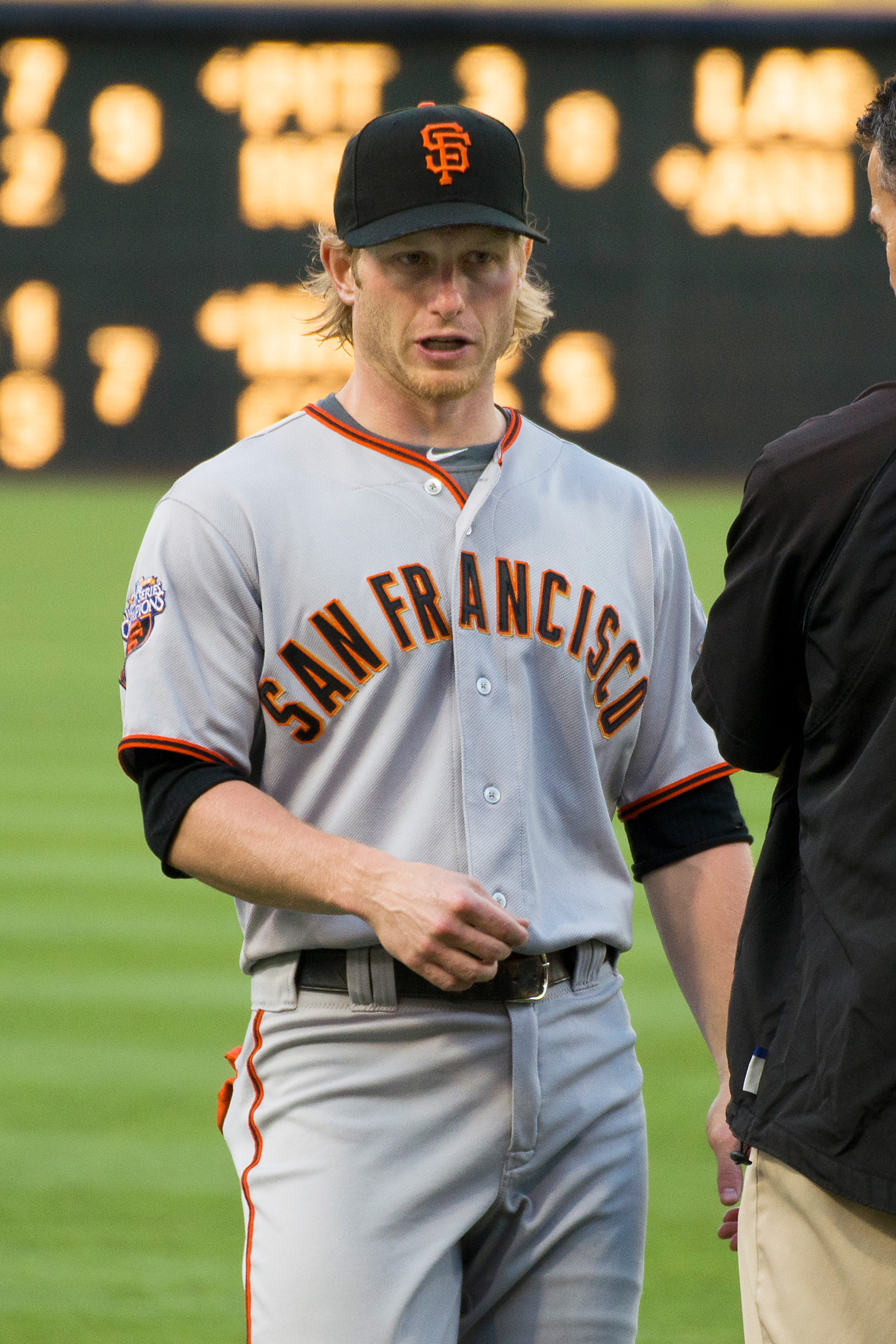
Fontenot on July 15, 2011

Fontenot had little trouble joining his new team since the Cubs were already in San Francisco. He played the first two games of the series with the Cubs and the last one with the Giants. San Francisco wanted him because Édgar Rentería had just been placed on the disabled list with a left biceps strain. With his new team, Fontenot was used at second base, shortstop, and third base, serving as a pinch hitter as well. He appeared in 28 games (71 at bats) for San Francisco, batting .282 with 10 runs scored, 20 hits, no home runs, and five RBIs. In 103 games (240 at bats) combined between Chicago and San Francisco, he batted .283 with 24 runs scored, 68 hits, one home run, and 25 RBIs.

After a one-year hiatus, Fontenot returned to the playoffs as part of a Giants team that won the NL West. After pinch-hitting in Game 2 of the NLDS against the Braves, he started Games 3 and 4 at third base. He had a triple against Tim Hudson to start the second inning of Game 3 and scored the Giants' first run in their eventual 3–2 victory. The Giants won the series in four games, advancing to the NL Championship Series (NLCS) against the Phillies. Fontenot started the first two games of the series at third base, but after only recording one hit in seven at bats, he was used merely as a pinch hitter in his other two appearances in the series. He got a hit in his only at bat of Game 6, a 3–2 series-clinching victory that sent the Giants to the World Series against the Texas Rangers. Fontenot had the unusual distinction of being credited with a game played in the World Series without recording a plate appearance or a play in the field. In the eighth inning of Game 2, the left-handed-hitting Fontenot was announced as a pinch-hitter with the Giants leading the Rangers, 6–0. The Rangers replaced right-handed pitcher Mark Lowe with the left-handed Michael Kirkman, prompting the Giants to replace Fontenot with the right-handed Aaron Rowand, who tripled. Fontenot went on to become a World Series champion as San Francisco won the series in five games, their first World Series victory since 1954.

In 2011, Fontenot received a slight raise in salary, earning $1.05 million. He began the season as a backup player. On April 13, Fontenot hit a go-ahead home run against Ted Lilly to help the Giants win 4–3 over the Dodgers. He took over as the Giants' everyday shortstop on April 30 after Pablo Sandoval was placed on the disabled list with a broken hamate bone and Miguel Tejada was shifted over to play third base. On May 7, he made a difficult play to rob Seth Smith of a hit in the top of the ninth inning against the Rockies, then ended the game in the bottom of the inning with a game-winning sacrifice fly against Franklin Morales. After suffering a left groin injury in late May, Fontenot was on the disabled list until July 8. He started several games at second base and shortstop for the rest of the season, with most of these starts coming in July and August. In 85 games (220 at bats), he batted .227 with 22 runs scored, 50 hits, four home runs, and 21 RBIs. He batted .154 in pinch-hitting situations.

In 2012 spring training, Fontenot found himself competing with Theriot for a spot on the Giants' roster. On March 30, Fontenot was released, just before $787,000 of his salary for the coming year would have become fully guaranteed.

=== Philadelphia Phillies (2012) ===
On April 13, 2012, the Philadelphia Phillies signed Fontenot to a minor league contract. He was assigned to the Lehigh Valley IronPigs of the International League, batting .308 with one home run and seven RBIs in 16 games with the club. On May 14, he was called up by the Phillies. He had a season-high three hits and an RBI on June 7 in an 8–3 loss to the Dodgers. Against the Orioles the next day, he hit his only home run of the year, a two-run shot against Jake Arrieta in a 9–6 victory over the Orioles. On August 1, Fontenot was designated for assignment by the Phillies. Fontenot had recorded a .289 batting average, a.343 on-base percentage, and a .340 on-base plus slugging percentage in 47 games, but he had only recorded one hit in 15 at bats against left-handed pitchers. Michael Martínez was recalled to take his place. Fontenot was released by the Phillies four days later.

=== Tampa Bay Rays ===
The Tampa Bay Rays signed Fontenot to a minor league contract on November 29, 2012. He spent the 2013 season playing for the Durham Bulls of the International League. In 120 games (417 at bats), he batted .264 with 53 runs scored, 110 hits, four home runs, and 42 RBIs. Though he played 82 games at second base, Fontenot also made 15 appearances at shortstop and 13 appearances at third base, serving as a designated hitter, pinch hitter, or pinch runner in his other appearances. He became a free agent after the season.

On January 8, 2014, Fontenot signed a minor league contract with the Washington Nationals. He was released on March 26 after hitting just .105 in spring training. The Rays signed him again two days later, and Fontenot played with Durham for the second year in a row. He was again primarily used as a second baseman (82 games), also making seven appearances at third base and serving as a designated hitter, pinch hitter, or pinch runner in his other appearances. In 113 games (398 at bats), he batted .276 with 35 runs scored, 110 hits, three home runs, and 48 RBIs. He became a free agent after the season and has not played professional baseball since.

== Career statistics ==
In 582 games (1,143 at bats), Fontenot batted .265 with 175 runs scored, 374 hits, 27 home runs, and 163 RBIs. He played 303 games as a second baseman, 89 games as a third baseman, and 50 games at shortstop. He played 422 games with the Cubs, 113 with the Giants, and 47 with the Phillies.

== Personal life ==
Fontenot is good friends with Ryan Theriot, his teammate at LSU, and with the Cubs. It was through Theriot's wife that Fontenot met his wife, Ashley.
