= Gregor Blanco =

Venezuelan baseball player (born 1983)

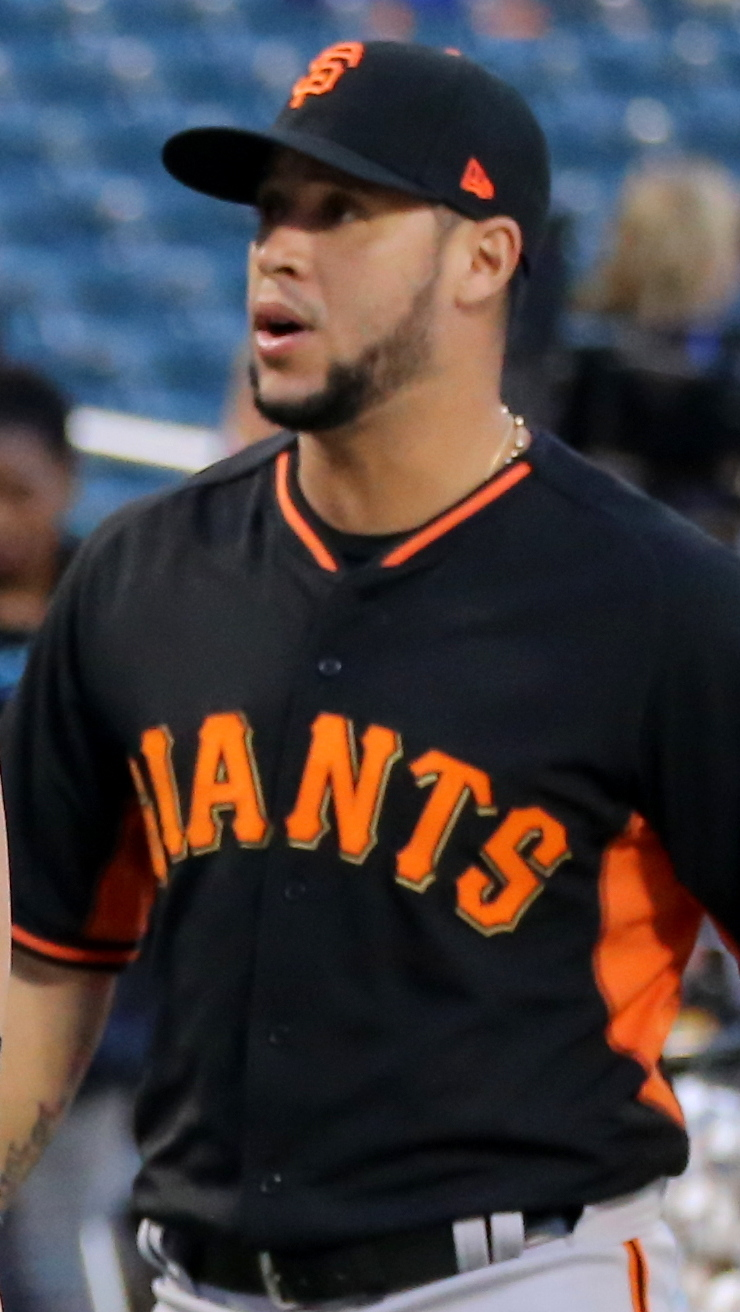
- Blanco with the San Francisco Giants in 2016
- Outfielder
- Born: December 24, 1983 (age 42); Caracas, Venezuela
- Batted: Left Threw: Left

MLB debut
- March 30, 2008, for the Atlanta Braves

Last MLB appearance
- September 30, 2018, for the San Francisco Giants

MLB statistics
- Batting average: .255
- Home runs: 26
- Runs batted in: 235
- Stats at Baseball Reference

Teams
- Atlanta Braves (2008–2010); Kansas City Royals (2010); San Francisco Giants (2012–2016); Arizona Diamondbacks (2017); San Francisco Giants (2018)

Career highlights and awards
- 2× World Series champion (2012, 2014)

Grégor Miguel Blanco Pedraza (born December 24, 1983) is a Venezuelan former professional baseball outfielder. He played in Major League Baseball (MLB) for the Atlanta Braves, Kansas City Royals, San Francisco Giants, and Arizona Diamondbacks. His nickname was "White Shark", as blanco is white in Spanish, and he played for Los Tiburones de La Guaira, The Sharks of CUA.

== Early life ==
Grégor Miguel Blanco Pedraza was born on December 24, 1983, in Caracas, Venezuela.

== Professional career ==
Blanco was the center fielder and leadoff hitter for Tiburones de La Guaira in the Venezuelan Winter League, hitting .315 (178 AB) in the 2006–07 season, .345 (229 AB) in the 2007–08 season (finishing second in MVP voting) and .349 (172 AB) in the 2008–09 season.

=== Atlanta Braves (2008–2010) ===
Blanco signed with the Atlanta Braves on July 4, 2000, as an undrafted free agent. He beat out Josh Anderson in spring training to become the Braves' backup outfielder in 2008. He began to see regular playing time after Mark Kotsay injured his back on May 26.

In 2008, he had the lowest home run per plate appearance percentage in the majors (among regular home run hitters) (0.2%).

=== Kansas City Royals (2010) ===
On July 31, 2010, Blanco was traded to the Kansas City Royals along with Jesse Chavez and Tim Collins for Kyle Farnsworth and Rick Ankiel.

=== Washington Nationals ===
On May 8, 2011, Blanco was traded to the Washington Nationals in exchange for a player to be named later. During the offseason of 2011, Gregor played in the Venezuelan Winter league and was named the MVP for the 2011 season.

=== San Francisco Giants (2012–2016) ===
Blanco signed a minor league contract with the San Francisco Giants on November 16, 2011, and was selected to be part of the Giants' 2012 Opening Day roster as an outfielder.

On June 13, 2012, Blanco made a fully extended diving catch in deep right-center field, catching the ball in the end of his mitt, to rob Jordan Schafer of a hit in the top of the 7th inning of Matt Cain's perfect game. The Mercury News wrote "In a town very familiar with the words "The Catch", Blanco made one for the ages: he took off on a dead sprint at the crack of the bat and made a diving catch on the warning track in center field, 400 feet from home plate."

On July 13, 2013, in a 9–0 win over the San Diego Padres at Petco Park, Blanco caught the final out of Tim Lincecum's first career no-hitter in the ninth inning. It was the first no-hitter in the history of the ballpark.

On September 5, 2014, Blanco made an error that ended his 306-game errorless streak. He dropped the ball on a Bryan Holaday line drive. On July 8, 2016, Blanco hit his first career pinch-hit home run, and his first of the season. In 2016 with the Giants he batted .224/.309/.311.

=== Arizona Diamondbacks (2017) ===
On January 17, 2017, Blanco signed a minor league contract with the Arizona Diamondbacks that included an invitation to spring training. He was released on March 27, and re-signed to a new minor league contract the next day.

=== Second stint with San Francisco Giants (2018) ===
On January 29, 2018, Blanco signed a minor league contract to return to the Giants. His contract was purchased by the Giants on March 28, 2018, and he was assigned to the Opening Day roster. He was designated for assignment on June 2, 2018. In his second stint, he hit .217/.262/.317 with 2 home runs.

=== New York Mets ===
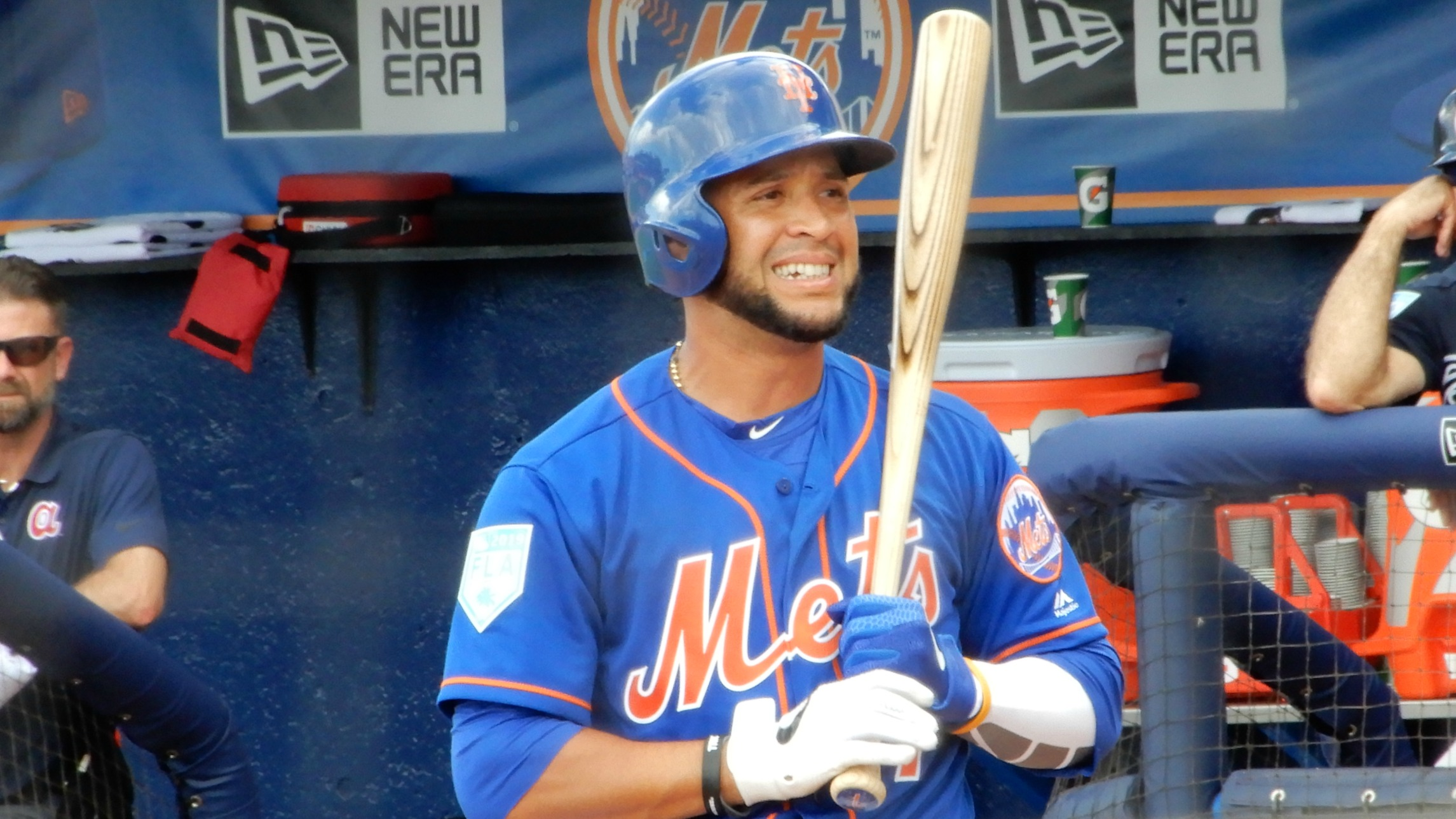
Blanco with the New York Mets during spring training in 2019

On December 21, 2018, Blanco signed a minor league contract with the New York Mets that included an invitation to spring training. In 118 games for the Triple–A Syracuse Mets, he slashed .246/.339/.406 with 13 home runs, 43 RBI, and 11 stolen bases. Blanco elected free agency following the season on November 4, 2019.

== Post-playing career ==
On February 6, 2020, Blanco retired to take on a new post in the baseball operations department for MLB.

== Personal life ==
Blanco has three Sons, Grenyer Blanco, Gregor Blanco Jr. and Grecia Blanco. He is married to Mirna Castro de Blanco. His father's name is Hernan Blanco, and his brothers are named Gregory and Gregsman.

== See also ==
- List of Major League Baseball players from Venezuela
