= Ryan Theriot =

American baseball player (born 1979)

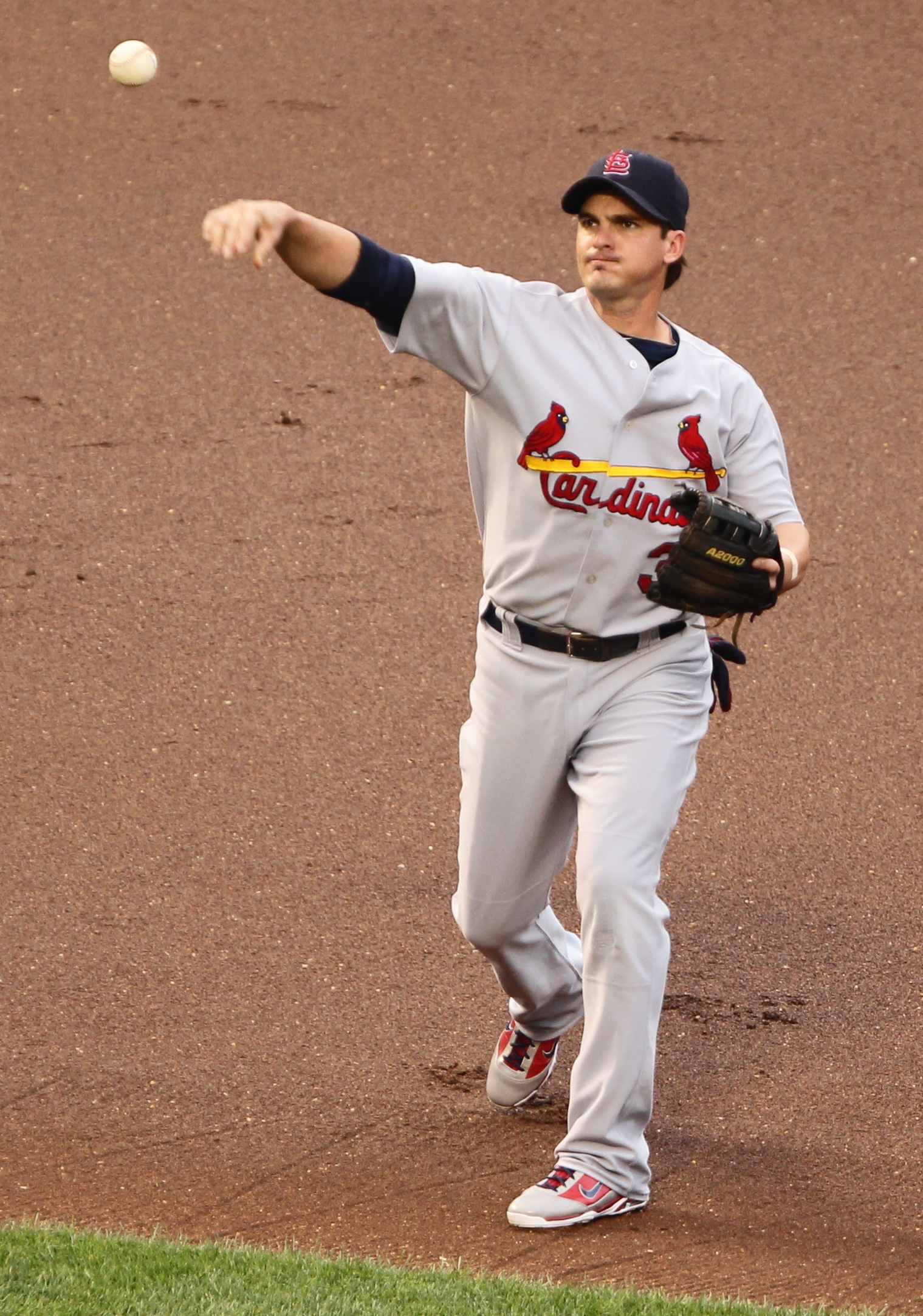
- Theriot with the St. Louis Cardinals
- Shortstop / Second baseman
- Born: December 7, 1979 (age 46); Baton Rouge, Louisiana, U.S.
- Batted: Right Threw: Right

MLB debut
- September 13, 2005, for the Chicago Cubs

Last MLB appearance
- October 3, 2012, for the San Francisco Giants

MLB statistics
- Batting average: .281
- Home runs: 17
- Runs batted in: 257
- Stats at Baseball Reference

Teams
- Chicago Cubs (2005–2010); Los Angeles Dodgers (2010); St. Louis Cardinals (2011); San Francisco Giants (2012)

Career highlights and awards
- 2× World Series champion (2011, 2012)

Ryan Stewart Theriot (/ˈtɛrioʊ/ TER-rio; born December 7, 1979) is an American former professional baseball shortstop and second baseman. He played in Major League Baseball (MLB) for the Chicago Cubs, Los Angeles Dodgers, St. Louis Cardinals, and San Francisco Giants.

A shortstop in college, Theriot was converted to second base for his major league debut, but played shortstop throughout the 2007–2009 seasons. Theriot then was switched back to second base to make room for rookie Starlin Castro, who took his spot at shortstop on May 7, 2010.

== Early life ==
Theriot graduated from Broadmoor High School in Baton Rouge, Louisiana, in 1998. While there, he played three seasons on the basketball team as a point guard and four seasons on the baseball team as a shortstop. He was a highly decorated baseball player, so he opted to not play basketball during his senior year of high school to focus on his baseball skills. While at Broadmoor, he played alongside childhood friends, Mike Woods and Trae Duncan, and together they set Louisiana High School Athletic Association history by becoming All American infielders from the same high school. They all later became first-team All State for class 4A at third base, shortstop, and second base, becoming the first trio to earn such awards.

== College career ==
Theriot played college baseball at Louisiana State University and was named to the College World Series all-tournament team in 2000. On June 12, 2000, Theriot broke up a no-hitter that was being thrown by his future teammate, Mark Prior, then pitching for the University of Southern California (USC).

Theriot scored the game-winning run in the 2000 national championship game following a Brad Cresse single. The CWS title was the fifth for LSU in nine seasons. After the 2000 season, he played collegiate summer baseball with the Wareham Gatemen of the Cape Cod Baseball League and was named a league all-star.

Ryan followed up the 2000 season with a 2001 campaign that resulted in a second-team All-SEC selection, the only all-conference honor of his college career. Prior to the 2001 season, Theriot was voted team captain by his teammates.

Theriot began his career as LSU's starting second baseman in 1999. He moved to shortstop in 2000 to make way for future Cubs teammate and former LSU teammate Mike Fontenot.

== Professional career ==
=== Chicago Cubs (2001–2010) ===
Theriot was drafted by the Chicago Cubs in the third round, with the 78th overall selection, of the 2001 Major League Baseball draft.

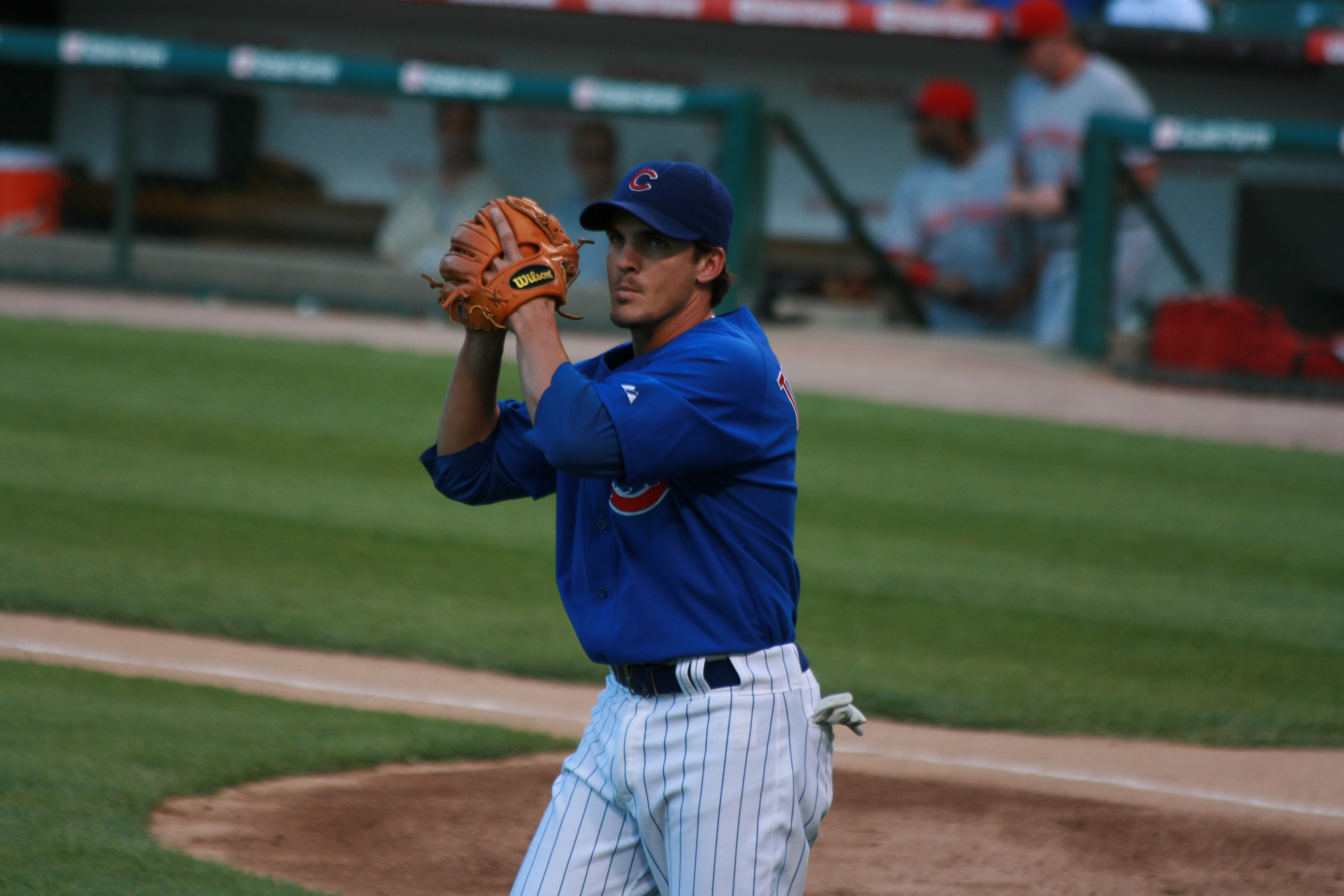
Theriot is warming up before a game in 2008.

Theriot made his Major League Baseball (MLB) debut on September 13, 2005, as a pinch hitter against the Cincinnati Reds, and gained his first hit the following day against Brian Shackelford. In 2006, he split time between the Iowa Cubs and the MLB team, hitting .328 in 53 games with the Chicago team.

In 2007, Theriot made the opening-day roster as a utility player, but the early-season struggles of César Izturis lead to Theriot getting more starts and quickly became the starter. Izturis was traded in July. Also in 2007, Theriot was reunited with his former collegiate teammate Mike Fontenot. Theriot and Fontenot made up the double-play combination for the 2000 National Champion LSU Tigers.

Theriot was notably versatile throughout the 2007 season, playing multiple positions defensively and hitting all over the batting order. Despite impressive numbers from Theriot in the lead-off spot, albeit a small sample size, the return of Alfonso Soriano resulted in Theriot returning to second in the batting order.

In 2008, Theriot had the sixth-best batting average in the National League.

While not expected to hit for power, Theriot was asked to try to drive in more runs early in 2009 as the Cubs dealt with injuries and poor performance from their power hitters, including Aramis Ramírez, Alfonso Soriano, Geovany Soto, and Milton Bradley. He quickly went on a relative tear and smacked seven home runs, including his first two ever outside Wrigley Field, as the other players regained their health.

Theriot hit his first career grand slam on May 1, 2009, against the Florida Marlins. The Cubs were down 5–2 when he hit it, and it gave them the lead. The Cubs won 8–6.

On February 19, 2010, the Cubs went to salary arbitration with Theriot, the first time they had done so since 1993. Theriot's figure was one year, $3.4M. The Cubs' figure was also one year, but $2.6M. The Cubs won the case. He appeared in 96 games with the Cubs in 2010, hitting .284.

=== Los Angeles Dodgers (2010) ===
On July 31, 2010, Theriot and Ted Lilly were traded to the Los Angeles Dodgers for Blake DeWitt. He was assigned the number 13. He hit .242 in 54 games with the Dodgers. At second base, Theriot had a .996 fielding percentage.

=== St. Louis Cardinals (2011) ===
On November 30, 2010, Theriot was traded to the St. Louis Cardinals in exchange for Blake Hawksworth. Theriot wore number 3 on his uniform, as his familiar number 2 was retired for Red Schoendienst years earlier.

During the 2011 season, Theriot had a 20-game hitting streak. He also drove in 47 runs and hit 26 doubles in only 442 at-bats. On July 17, 2011, Theriot was ejected from the game between the Cardinals and Cincinnati Reds for arguing and making contact with umpire Mike Muchlinski with his hat after a call that Theriot's foot was dragged off the bag during a catch at second base. He was suspended for two games and fined, but the suspension was later reduced to one game.

Theriot won the World Series with the Cardinals in 2011. He contributed greatly with his bat, especially in the NL Division Series with the Philadelphia Phillies. Against the Milwaukee Brewers, Theriot at second base robbed Prince Fielder of a seemingly sure hit for the third out of the inning. Fielder was so impressed with the play that he waited for Theriot to exit the field and gave him an enthusiastic high five. On December 13, Theriot was non-tendered by the Cardinals and became a free agent.

=== San Francisco Giants (2012) ===
On January 27, 2012, Theriot agreed to a one-year, $1.25 million nonguaranteed contract with the San Francisco Giants, providing depth to the team's middle infield. Theriot was briefly reunited with his college teammate and double-play partner Fontenot, before Fontenot was released by the Giants at the end of spring training. Theriot shared playing time at second base with Emmanuel Burriss at the beginning of the season, but went on the 15-day disabled list in May. When he returned, he became the regular second baseman, replacing the struggling Burriss. He remained in the lineup virtually every day until August, when he was moved back to the bench and lost his starting job to newly acquired Marco Scutaro, whom the Giants had acquired in a trade with the Colorado Rockies.

Theriot won the World Series with the San Francisco Giants in 2012. In game 4 of the Series, Theriot was used as a designated hitter for the first time in his major league career. In the 10th inning, he hit a leadoff single and eventually scored the go-ahead and winning run (coincidentally being driven in by Scutaro, who had taken his spot in the lineup 2 months before), which gave the Giants the clinching victory in a four-game sweep of the Detroit Tigers. As it turned out, Theriot scored the game- and series-clinching run in his final on-field action in MLB. Theriot became the sixth player in Major League history to win consecutive World Series championships on different teams.

After sitting out the entire 2013 season, Theriot announced his retirement on January 6, 2014.

=== Career statistics ===
In 899 games over eight seasons, Theriot posted a .281 batting average (911-for-3246) with 446 runs, 17 home runs, 257 RBIs, 121 stolen bases, and 285 bases on balls. He finished his career with a .976 fielding percentage playing primarily at shortstop and second base. Theriot ranked first in the NL for most singles in 2008, 2009, and 2010.

== TOOTBLAN ==
A new baseball statistic was developed in 2008 called TOOTBLAN - an acronym that stands for Thrown Out on the Bases Like a Nincompoop - in order to account for Theriot's poor baserunning skills. It has since grown in usage, and has become an officially tracked statistic.

== Personal life ==
Theriot and his wife, Johnnah Haik, live in Baton Rouge, Louisiana with their three children.

Theriot was referred to by Cubs (and later Giants) fans and broadcasters as "The Riot" as a play on the spelling of his last name.

On November 12, 2010, Theriot hosted the Ryan Theriot Golf Classic which benefits the National Wildlife Federation, the Autism Society, and the Fore Kids Foundation.
