= Theriot, Lafourche Parish, Louisiana =

Theriot, Louisiana
- Unincorporated community
- Location within Louisiana Location within the United States
- Coordinates: 29°45′02″N 90°37′55″W
- Country: United States
- State: Louisiana
- Parish: Lafourche
- Elevation: 7 ft (2.1 m)
- Time zone: UTC-6 (Central (CST))
  - Summer (DST): UTC-5 (CDT)
- Area code: 985
- GNIS feature ID: 543722

Theriot (/ˈtɛrioʊ/) is an unincorporated community in Lafourche Parish, southeastern part of the state of Louisiana, United States.
