= Drew Storen =

American baseball player (born 1987)

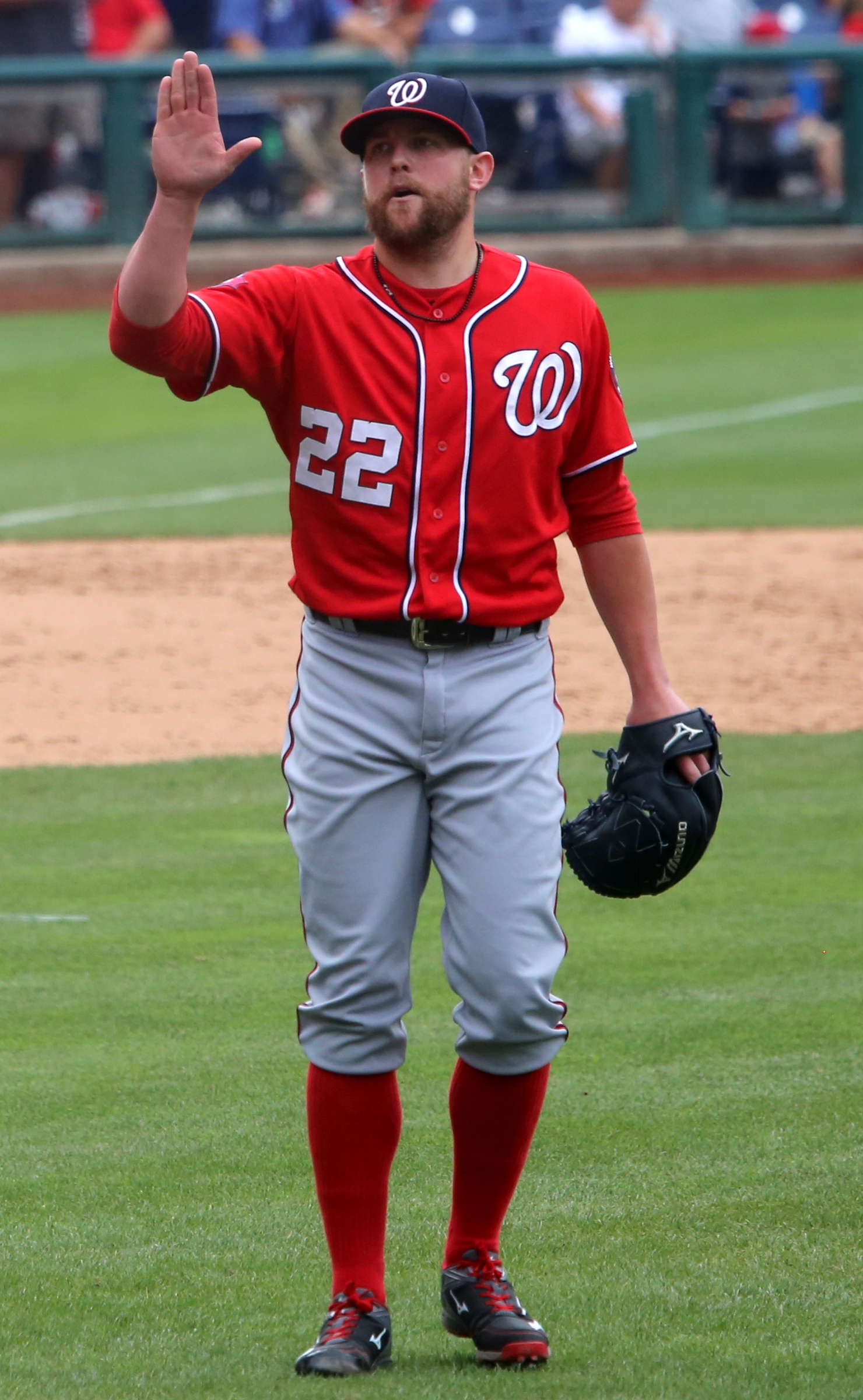
- Storen with the Washington Nationals in 2015
- Pitcher
- Born: August 11, 1987 (age 38); Indianapolis, Indiana, U.S.
- Batted: Switch Threw: Right

MLB debut
- May 17, 2010, for the Washington Nationals

Last MLB appearance
- September 1, 2017, for the Cincinnati Reds

MLB statistics
- Win–loss record: 29–18
- Earned run average: 3.45
- Strikeouts: 417
- Saves: 99
- Stats at Baseball Reference

Teams
- Washington Nationals (2010–2015); Toronto Blue Jays (2016); Seattle Mariners (2016); Cincinnati Reds (2017)

Drew Patrick Storen (born August 11, 1987) is an American former professional baseball relief pitcher. He played in Major League Baseball (MLB) for the Washington Nationals, Toronto Blue Jays, Seattle Mariners, and Cincinnati Reds.

Washington selected Storen with the 10th overall selection in the 2009 MLB draft. He made his MLB debut for Washington in May 2010. He served as the team's closer but had blown saves in the 2012 and 2014 National League Division Series. He threw an immaculate inning with the Reds in 2017, his final season in MLB.

== Amateur career ==
=== High school ===
Storen attended Brownsburg High School in Brownsburg, Indiana, where he was teammate of fellow future major league pitcher Lance Lynn. Storen had 30 wins, 319 strikeouts, and a 1.55 earned run average (ERA) over his high school career, including a 9–0 win–loss record as a sophomore in 2005, en route to a state championship. He was named first-team all-state in 2006 and 2007, as well as all-state honorable mention in 2005 by the Associated Press, the 2007 Hendricks County Flyer Athlete of the Year, three-time first-team All-Hoosier Crossroads Conference selection (2005–2007), first-team All-Metro West three times by The Indianapolis Star (2005–2007), their Super team in 2006 and 2007 and was their Metro-West High School Player of the Year in 2007. He participated in the 2007 Indiana North-South All-Star Game, and was a state nominee for the 2006 Wendy's High School Heisman Award. He was ranked 49th among the 2007 Top 100 High School prospects by Baseball America.

Storen was drafted by the New York Yankees in the 34th round of the 2007 Major League Baseball draft but did not sign.

=== College career ===
Storen enrolled at Stanford University to play college baseball for the Stanford Cardinal.

In 2008, he played collegiate summer baseball with the Cotuit Kettleers of the Cape Cod Baseball League. Over two seasons at Stanford, Storen went 12–4 with a 3.64 ERA and 15 saves. In 99 innings, he allowed 43 runs (40 earned), on 87 hits, with 23 walks, and 116 strikeouts. In both seasons he made the First All-Pac-10 Conference team.

== Professional career ==
=== Minor leagues ===
The Nationals selected Storen with the tenth overall pick of the 2009 MLB draft, which they received as compensation for failure to sign 2008 MLB draft first-round pick Aaron Crow. Storen, expressing a desire to make it to the majors as quickly as possible, signed with the Nationals the next day. Upon signing, he was assigned to the Single-A Hagerstown Suns of the South Atlantic League. Storen made an early and strong impact during his time with the Suns, and on July 19 he was called up to the High-A Potomac Nationals of the Carolina League. Storen made his first pitching appearance with Potomac on July 21, earning a six out save, striking out three batters and allowing only one hit. Overall, Storen posted a 1.80 ERA in seven games with Potomac to earn a promotion to the Double-A Harrisburg Senators of the Eastern League. In 12 1/3 innings with Harrisburg, he did not allow an earned run.

Storen started the 2010 season at Double-A and by the end of April was promoted to the Triple-A Syracuse Chiefs after seven appearances in which he pitched 9 1/3 innings, allowing only one run, striking out 11 and walking one, earning four saves. He lasted at Syracuse just three weeks, in which he made six appearances allowing just one earned run before getting promoted to the Nationals on May 16.

=== Washington Nationals ===
==== 2010–2011 ====
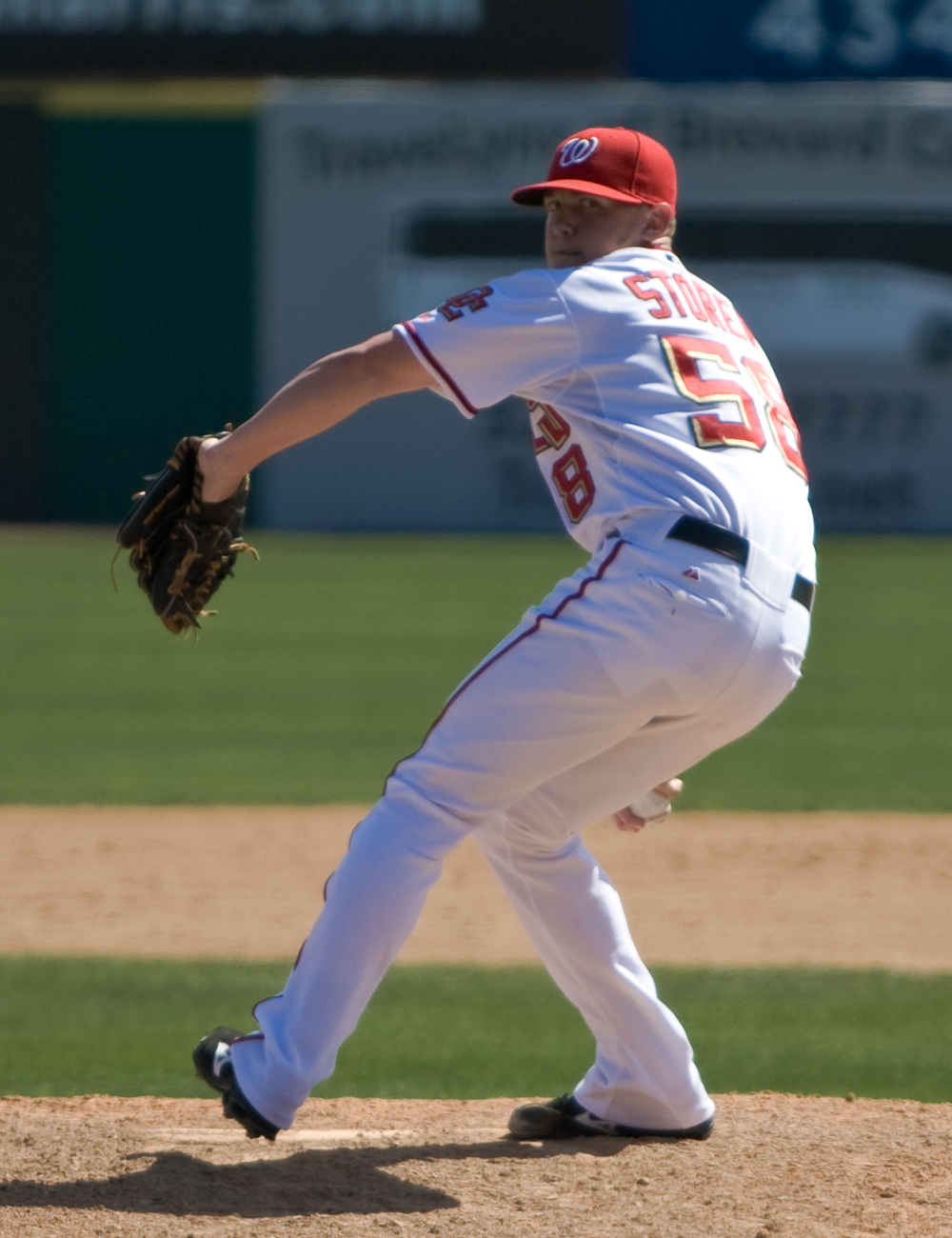
Storen as a rookie at 2010 spring training

Storen made his major league debut on May 17, 2010, against the St. Louis Cardinals, retiring two batters in 2/3 of an inning. Storen recorded his first major league save on August 6, 2010, against the Los Angeles Dodgers. In 2010, he pitched 55 1/3 innings over 54 games, finishing with a 4–4 record and a 3.58 ERA with five saves.

In 2011, Storen became the team's closer. He pitched 75 1/3 innings over 73 games, finishing the year with a 6–3 record, with 43 saves, and a 2.75 ERA. He tied for fourth in the MLB in saves.

==== 2012 ====
Before the 2012 season, Storen had surgery to remove a bone chip from his elbow, and missed the first 89 games of the season. He made his season debut on July 19, 2012. Tyler Clippard remained the Nationals' closer after Storen's return, though they shared the role later in the season. In the regular season, Storen posted a 3–1 win–loss with a 2.37 ERA, 4 saves, and 24 strikeouts over innings.

Storen took on the closer role for the National League Division Series (NLDS) against the St. Louis Cardinals, in the Nationals' first playoff appearance since the team moved to Washington. He got the save in Game 1 and the win in Game 4. In Game 5, Storen took the mound with a 7–5 lead, needing three outs to send the Nationals to the National League Championship Series. After giving up a leadoff double, he retired the next two batters. He was one strike away from the third out against both Yadier Molina and David Freese, but walked both to load the bases. Storen then gave up a two-run single to Daniel Descalso to tie the game. Manager Davey Johnson elected to have Storen pitch to Pete Kozma with the pitcher on deck; Storen allowed a two-run single to Kozma to give the Cardinals a 9–7 lead. The Nationals lost the game 9–7 and were eliminated. Storen's blown save, in which he had the Cardinals down to their final strike on five occasions, was described by teammates as "devastating" and he was said to be in "excruciating" mental pain after the loss; several teammates voiced support for him.

==== 2013–2014 ====
Before the 2013 season, the Nationals signed Rafael Soriano to be their closer, a move that Nationals general manager Mike Rizzo said had nothing to do with Storen's blown save in Game 5. Storen took on the roles of a middle relief and setup man. He was optioned to Triple-A Syracuse in late July following several rough outings. Storen returned to the Nationals in July and finished the season strong, with scoreless outings in 18 of his final 21 appearances. In 2013, he posted a 4–2 record, 4.52 ERA, and 58 strikeouts in 61 2/3 innings pitched.

Storen bounced back in 2014, recording a career-best 1.12 ERA in 56 1/3 innings pitched. After giving up 31 earned runs in 68 appearances during the previous season, he surrendered just seven in 65 outings during the 2014 campaign.

In Game 2 of the NLDS against the Giants, Storen was brought in by manager Matt Williams in relief of starter Jordan Zimmermann, who had allowed three hits and no runs in the game and had retired the last 20 hitters he faced before walking second baseman Joe Panik with two outs the ninth. Coming in with the Nationals up 1–0 and just one out remaining, Storen allowed two hits, a single to Buster Posey and an RBI double by Pablo Sandoval. Storen was credited with a blown save. The game went to extra innings; San Francisco's Brandon Belt hit a go-ahead home run in the eighteenth inning and the Giants won, 2–1. The Giants later won the series, three games to one.

==== 2015 ====
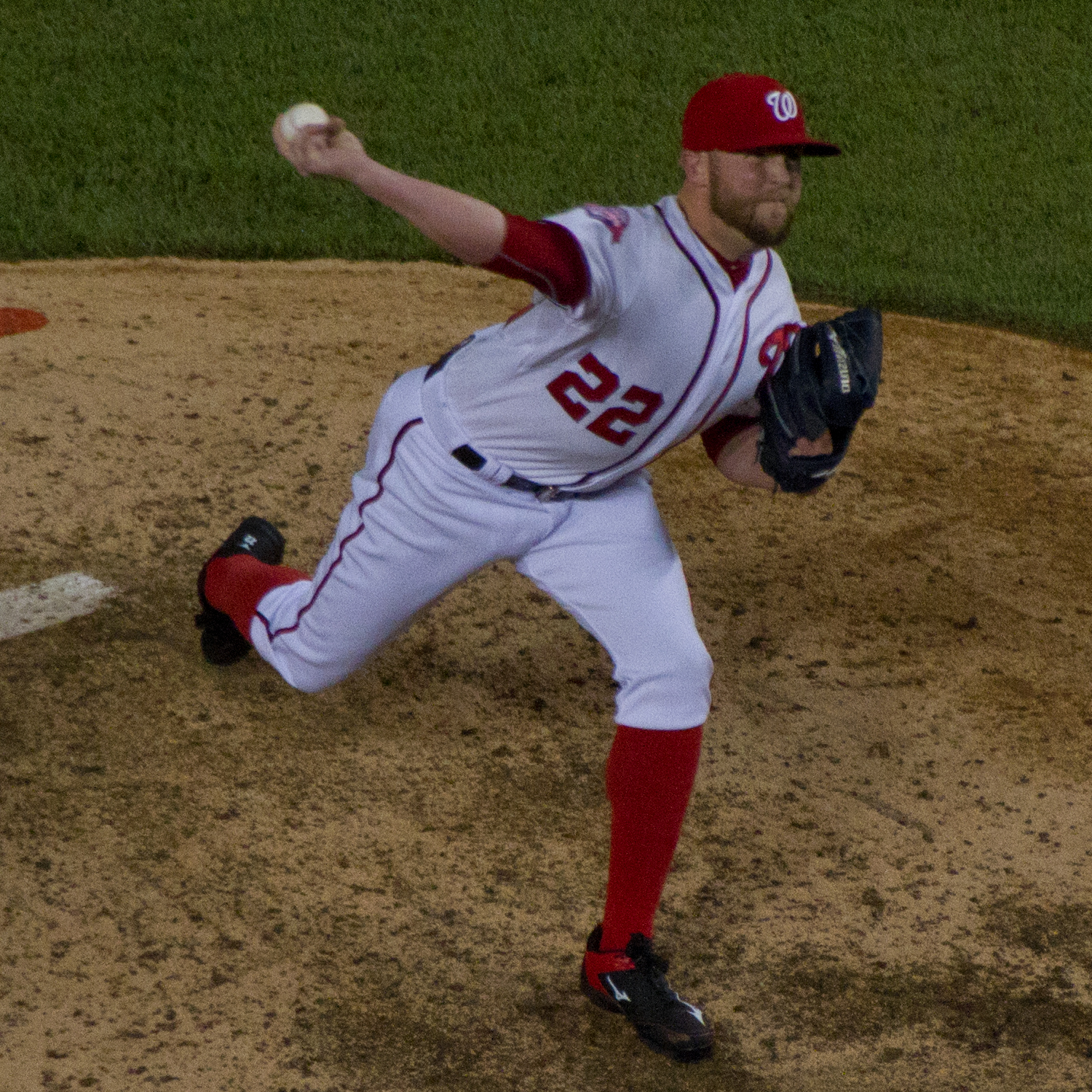
Storen pitching for Washington in 2015

Storen relinquished his closer role when Jonathan Papelbon was acquired by the Nationals from Philadelphia just before the trade deadline. He struggled as the Nationals' setup man, ending with two disastrous outings against the New York Mets in early September. After giving up the go-ahead runs on a homer by Yoenis Céspedes, Storen slammed a locker in frustration, breaking his thumb and ending his season. He went 2–2 with a 3.44 ERA for the year but was 0–2 with a 9.22 ERA after the Papelbon trade.

=== Toronto Blue Jays ===
On January 8, 2016, Storen was traded to the Toronto Blue Jays in exchange for outfielder Ben Revere and a player to be named later. Storen avoided salary arbitration with Toronto on January 15 when he agreed to a one-year, $8.375 million contract. After posting a 6.21 ERA in 33 1/3 innings pitched, Storen was designated for assignment on July 24.

=== Seattle Mariners ===
On July 26, 2016, Storen was traded to the Seattle Mariners for Joaquín Benoit. The Mariners were Storen's childhood favorite team, as he idolized Ken Griffey Jr. Storen appeared in 19 games for the Mariners, pitching 18 1/3 innings and attaining a 3–0 record with a 3.44 ERA.

=== Cincinnati Reds ===
On January 3, 2017, Storen signed a one-year, $3 million contract with the Cincinnati Reds. The contract included an additional $1.5 million in incentives, and a $500,000 assignment bonus if Storen was traded. On April 18, Storen closed out the ninth inning of a victory over the Baltimore Orioles with an immaculate inning, striking out all three batters on nine total pitches. On September 17, it was announced that Storen would undergo Tommy John surgery on his right elbow, ending his season and causing him to miss the 2018 season.

=== Kansas City Royals ===
On February 15, 2019, Storen signed a minor league contract with the Kansas City Royals. In nine appearances for the Double-A Northwest Arkansas Naturals, he struggled to an 0–1 record and 7.84 ERA with 12 strikeouts across 10 1/3 innings pitched. Storen was released by the Royals organization on June 19.

=== Philadelphia Phillies ===
On January 21, 2020, Storen signed a minor league contract with the Philadelphia Phillies. The Phillies released him on June 28.

== Pitching style ==
Storen threw three pitches in roughly equal proportion: a hard four-seam fastball and two-seam fastball that each range from 94 to 98 mph, and a sharp slider from 82 to 86. Right-handed hitters see the slider more often, and left-handed hitters see the two-seamer more often. Storen often relies on the slider with two strikes. On rare occasions, he has used a changeup against lefties.

== Personal life ==
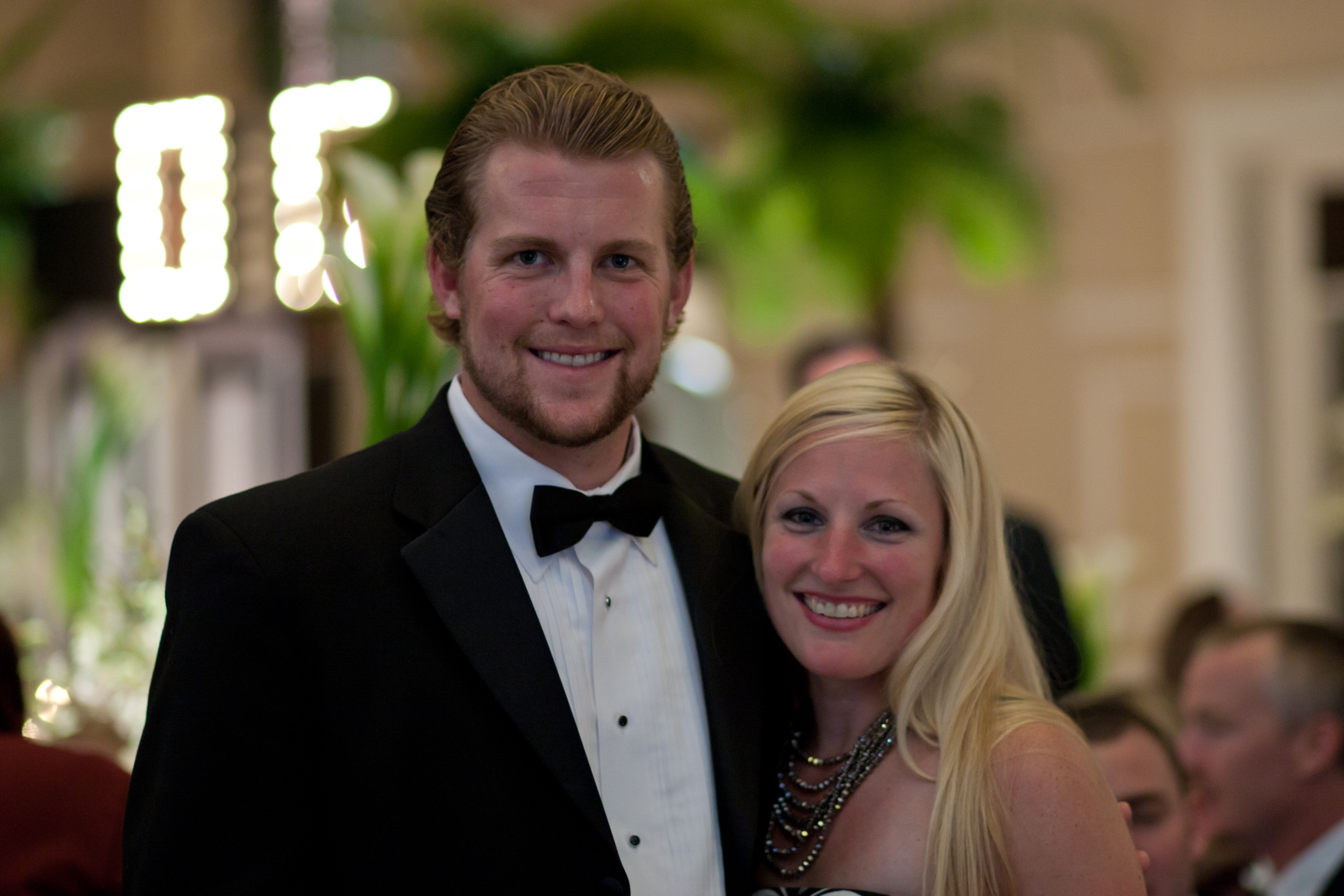
Storen and his sister in 2011

Storen lived in Lawrence, Indiana, before moving to Brownsburg, Indiana during his later elementary years. He is the son of sportscaster Mark Patrick and Pam Storen and has a sister. He is also related to sports executive Mike Storen and his daughter, sportscaster Hannah Storm. Storen and his wife have two sons.
