= Ryan Vogelsong =

American baseball player (born 1977)

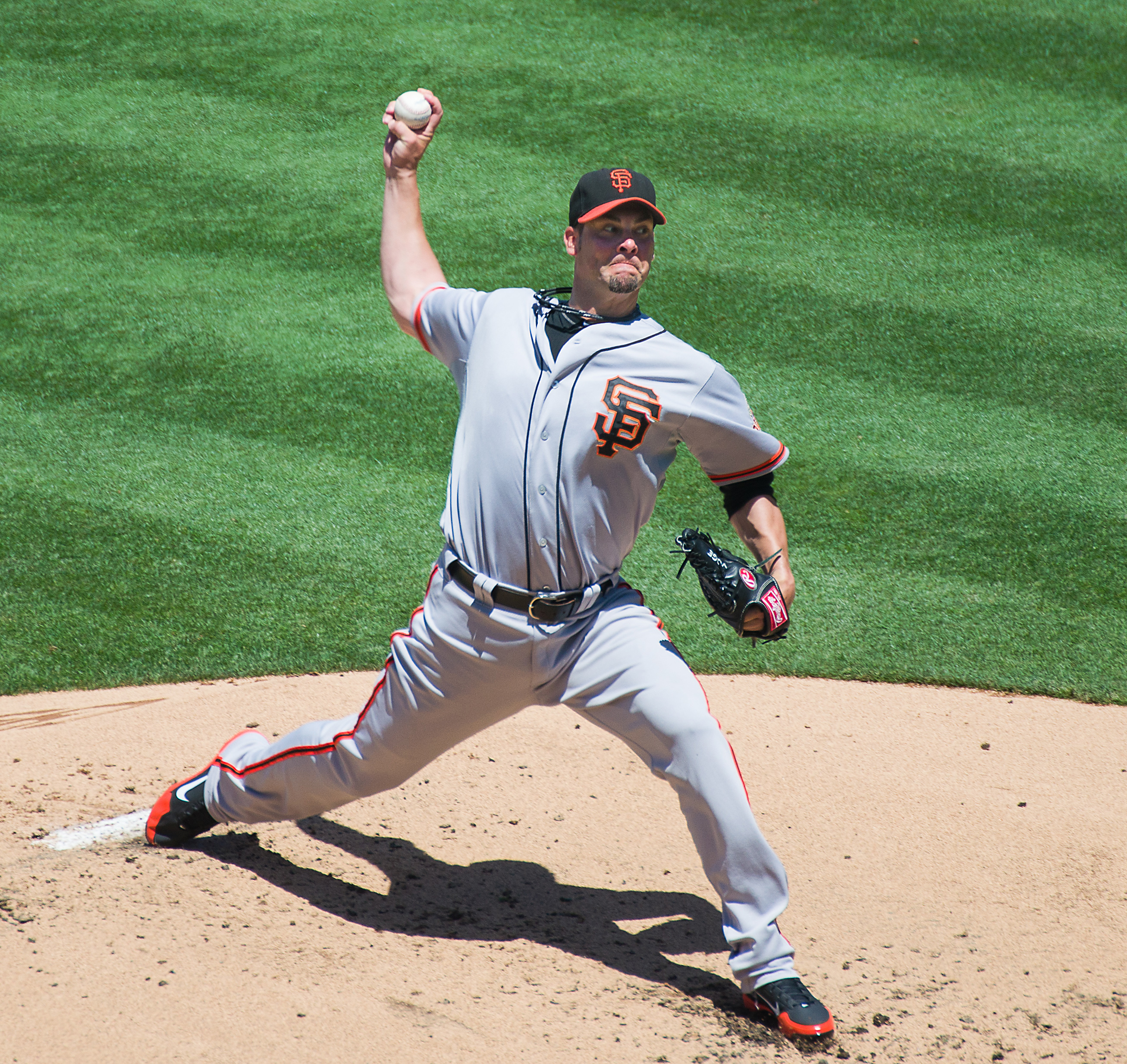
- Vogelsong with the San Francisco Giants in 2012
- Pitcher
- Born: July 22, 1977 (age 49); Charlotte, North Carolina, U.S.
- Batted: Right Threw: Right

Professional debut
- MLB: September 2, 2000, for the San Francisco Giants
- NPB: April 5, 2007, for the Hanshin Tigers

Last appearance
- NPB: 2009, for the Orix Buffaloes
- MLB: October 2, 2016, for the Pittsburgh Pirates

MLB statistics
- Win–loss record: 61–75
- Earned run average: 4.48
- Strikeouts: 900

NPB statistics
- Win–loss record: 11–14
- Earned run average: 4.17
- Strikeouts: 197
- Stats at Baseball Reference

Teams
- San Francisco Giants (2000–2001); Pittsburgh Pirates (2001, 2003–2006); Hanshin Tigers (2007–2008); Orix Buffaloes (2009); San Francisco Giants (2011–2015); Pittsburgh Pirates (2016)

Career highlights and awards
- All-Star (2011); 2× World Series champion (2012, 2014); San Francisco Giants Wall of Fame

Ryan Andrew Vogelsong (born July 22, 1977), nicknamed "Vogey", is an American former professional baseball pitcher. He played in Major League Baseball (MLB) for the San Francisco Giants and Pittsburgh Pirates and in Nippon Professional Baseball (NPB) for the Hanshin Tigers (2007–2008) and Orix Buffaloes (2009). He stands 6 feet 4 inches (1.93 m) tall and weighs 215 pounds (98 kg).

His career was revitalized with the Giants in 2011. He made the 2011 All-Star team, and in 2012 he posted a streak of 16 consecutive quality starts, allowing three earned runs or fewer in at least six innings each game. In four starts during the 2012 postseason, he recorded a 3–0 record with a 1.09 ERA, twice helping the Giants avoid elimination en route to their 2012 World Series title. In 2014, Vogelsong made a career-high 32 starts, helping the Giants win another title in the 2014 World Series.

== Early life ==
Ryan Andrew Vogelsong was born on July 22, 1977, in Charlotte, North Carolina. In 1995, Vogelsong graduated from Octorara Area High school in Atglen, Pennsylvania, where he played baseball, basketball, and soccer. He played his Little League baseball for Highland in the Southern Chester County Midget League and played Legion baseball in Oxford, Pennsylvania.

== College career ==
Vogelsong played for Kutztown University of Pennsylvania during the 1996–1998 seasons. He recorded 242 strikeouts and set nine school records in his three years at Kutztown. He was inducted into the university's Hall of Fame in 2005.

== Professional career ==
=== Draft and Minor Leagues ===
Vogelsong was drafted by the Giants in the fifth round of the 1998 MLB draft. In 1998, he made his minor league debut, with the Single A Salem-Keizer Volcanoes in Keizer, Oregon.

=== San Francisco Giants (2000–2001) ===
Vogelsong made his MLB debut with the Giants on September 2, 2000. He finished the rest of the 2000 season by appearing in four games, with six innings pitched in relief.

Vogelsong did not perform well to start the 2001 season, as he went 0–5 and compiled a 6.75 ERA in 15 games (two starts).

=== Pittsburgh Pirates (2001, 2003–2006) ===
Vogelsong was acquired by the Pirates on July 30, 2001, along with outfielder Armando Ríos, for pitcher Jason Schmidt and outfielder John Vander Wal. He appeared in two games for the Pirates before he required Tommy John surgery that kept him out of the majors until the end of the 2003 season.

The 2004 season marked Vogelsong's first full campaign in the major leagues. He spent most of the season as a starting pitcher. Vogelsong struggled in that role, ending the season with a 6–13 record and 6.50 ERA. He rebounded in 2005 after being moved to the bullpen, posting a 4.43 ERA and 2–2 record while being used primarily as a middle reliever. By the end of the 2006 season, Vogelsong had accumulated a career 10–22 record and a 5.86 ERA in 120 games and 315 innings over parts of six seasons.

=== Hanshin Tigers (2007–2008) ===
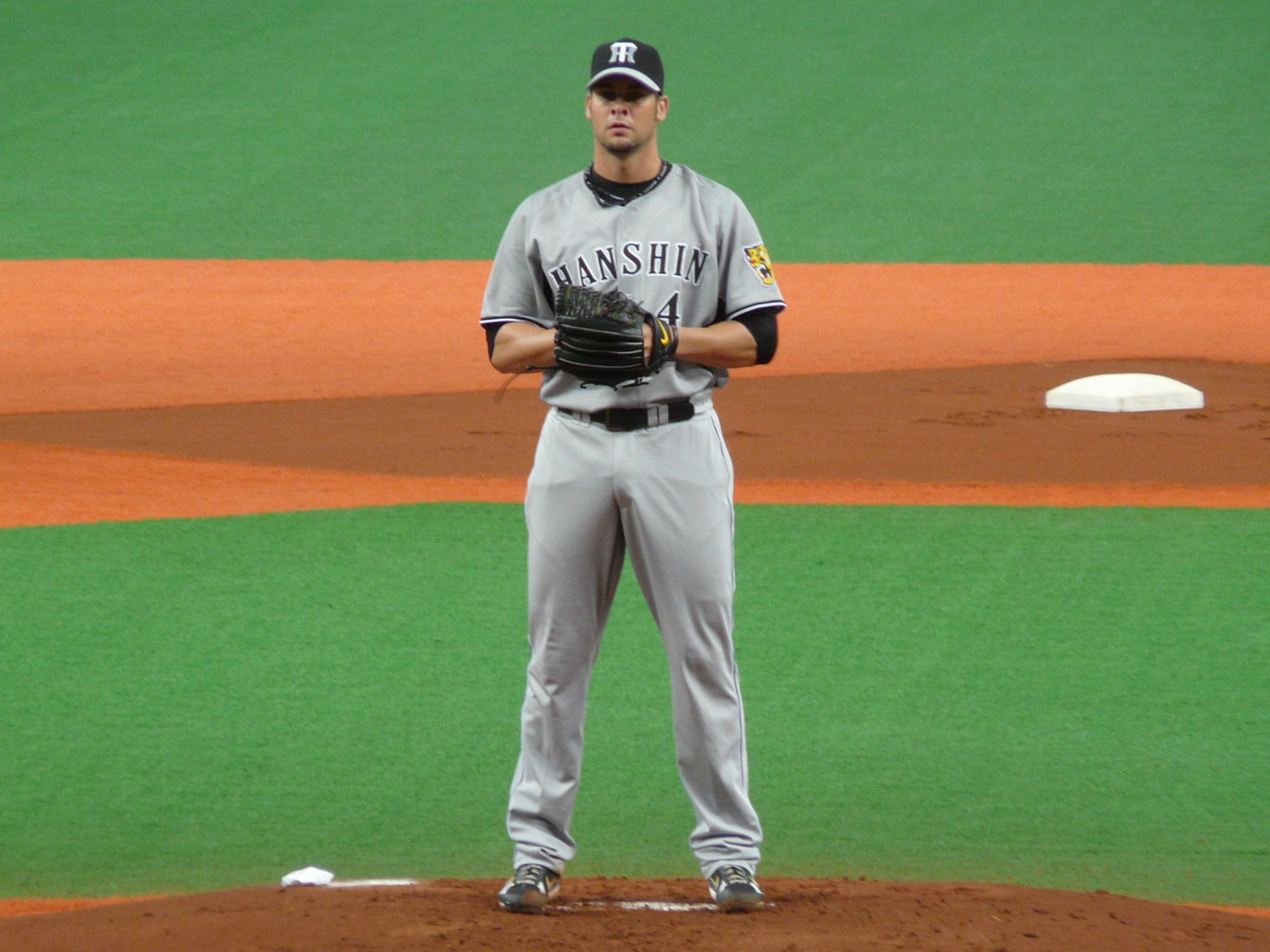
Vogelsong with the Hanshin Tigers in 2008

Vogelsong signed for the Hanshin Tigers of the Nippon Professional Baseball (NPB) in 2007 and made his Nippon Professional Baseball debut as their starting pitcher on April 5, 2007, facing a future Major League Baseball pitcher, Kenshin Kawakami. He won in his debut at the home stadium, Koshien Stadium, on April 12, 2007, hitting a home run in the bottom of the second inning.

=== Orix Buffaloes (2009) ===
Vogelsong signed a one-year deal to play for the Orix Buffaloes of the NPB in 2009.

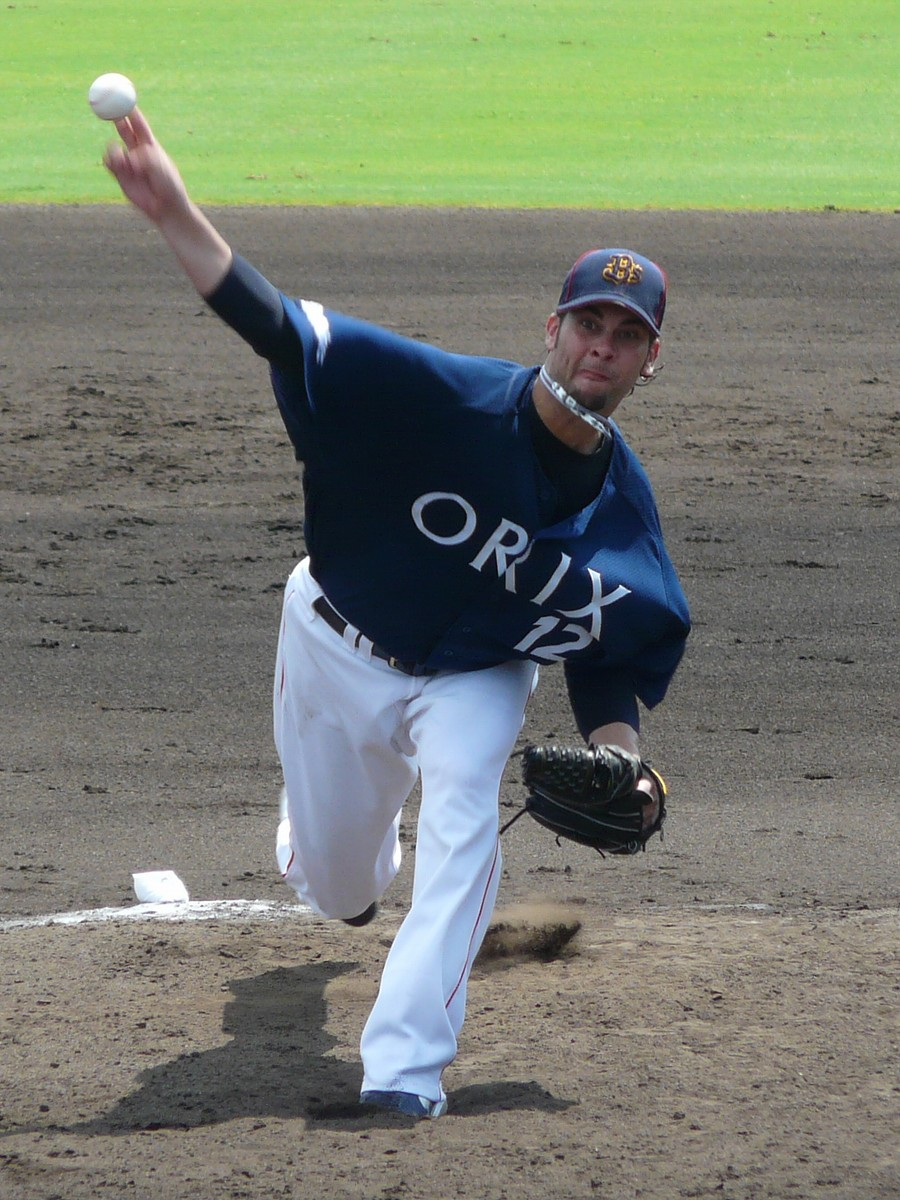
Vogelsong with the Orix Buffaloes in 2009

=== Philadelphia Phillies ===
During the 2009–2010 off-season, Vogelsong made his way back to MLB and signed a minor league deal with the Philadelphia Phillies. He appeared in 25 games for the AAA Lehigh Valley IronPigs, posting a 2–5 record with a 4.91 ERA in 58.2 innings. He was released by the Phillies on July 15, 2010.

=== Los Angeles Angels of Anaheim ===
On July 28, 2010, Vogelsong signed a minor league contract with the Los Angeles Angels of Anaheim. Vogelsong appeared in eight games for the AAA Salt Lake Bees, posting a 1–3 record with a 4.66 ERA in 36.2 innings pitched. He became a free agent following the season on November 6.

=== Second stint with San Francisco Giants (2011–2015) ===
On January 14, 2011, Vogelsong signed a minor league contract to return to the San Francisco Giants with an invitation to spring training. He started the season in AAA Fresno, but on April 17, 2011, the Giants purchased his contract to replace the injured Barry Zito. On April 28, 2011, after making two relief appearances, Vogelsong got his first start since the 2004 season against his former club, the Pirates. He held the host Pirates to two earned runs on four hits and struck out eight en route to a 5–2 Giants victory and his first MLB win since September 2005.

Vogelsong continued to excel in his replacement role, posting a record of 6–1 with a 2.17 ERA in the first half, which secured him a spot in San Francisco's vaunted starting rotation. Giants and 2011 National League All-Star manager Bruce Bochy named Vogelsong to the 2011 NL All-Star Team on July 3, 2011. He didn't see any action in the NL's 5–1 win over the AL. His first start after the All-Star break on July 18, 2011, a 5–0 win over the Los Angeles Dodgers, gave him enough innings pitched to qualify for the National League leader in ERA with 2.02.

In his final start of the season Vogelsong pitched seven shutout innings against the Colorado Rockies, giving up four hits and walking no batters. The 33-year-old Vogelsong finished his first MLB season as a starting pitcher since 2005 with a 13–7 record and a 2.71 ERA, the lowest among the San Francisco starting rotation that boasted Tim Lincecum, Matt Cain, and Madison Bumgarner. Five of Vogelsong's seven losses occurred in a row, during a stretch where Vogelsong received three total runs of support, with no more than one run scored each game by a struggling San Francisco offense.

During the month of August 2011, Vogelsong stated that playing winter ball in Venezuela in 2010 with Tiburones de La Guaira was the turning point to recover his career. Prior to his experience in Venezuela, Vogelsong had 10 wins, 22 losses and 5.86 ERA in his MLB career

==== 2012 ====
In January, Vogelsong and the Giants agreed to an $8.3 million, two-year contract.

Vogelsong continued to dominate in 2012. He boasted the lowest ERA in the National League at the All-Star Break and a 7–4 record. Despite his impressive pitching, Vogelsong did not make the 2012 All-Star team, a decision Giants fans consider a major snub. Vogelsong was the first ERA leader not to make the All-Star team since 2001 (Josh Johnson had not pitched enough innings in 2006 to qualify for the ERA title). On August 3, 2012, Vogelsong's 16-game streak of allowing three or fewer runs per game was snapped by the Colorado Rockies, when he allowed four runs while pitching 6.1 innings in a 16–4 Giants' win. Vogelsong finished the regular season with a 14–9 record in 31 starts with a 3.37 ERA.

In the 2012 postseason, Vogelsong would play a pivotal role in the Giants' push toward their 2012 World Series title. During Game 3 of the 2012 National League Division Series in Cincinnati, with the Reds holding a commanding 2–0 lead in the series and the Giants facing elimination, Vogelsong pitched a tight game, with the score 1-1 through five innings. The Giants would go on to win Game 3, 2–1 in 10 innings on a Joaquin Arias ground ball mishandled by Scott Rolen, allowing Buster Posey to score the winning run. During Game 2 of the 2012 National League Championship Series in San Francisco, Vogelsong faced Chris Carpenter, with the Cardinals holding a 1–0 series lead. Vogelsong allowed one run in the second inning to tie the game, but proceeded to shut out the Cardinals' offense through seven innings en route to a 7–1 win at home to tie the series at one game apiece. During Game 6 of the NLCS in San Francisco, Vogelsong and the Giants faced elimination for a fifth time. Giants' pitching had begun to dominate. Vogelsong had a very strong outing this time, scattering five hits and allowing one run (in the sixth inning), after the Giants set the tempo with a four-run second inning to break the game open. He set a new career-high of nine strikeouts on the night after he struck out Daniel Descalso with a foul tip. The Giants won 6–1, pushing the NLCS to the limit in a magical Game 7, which they won to complete the comeback and advance to the World Series.

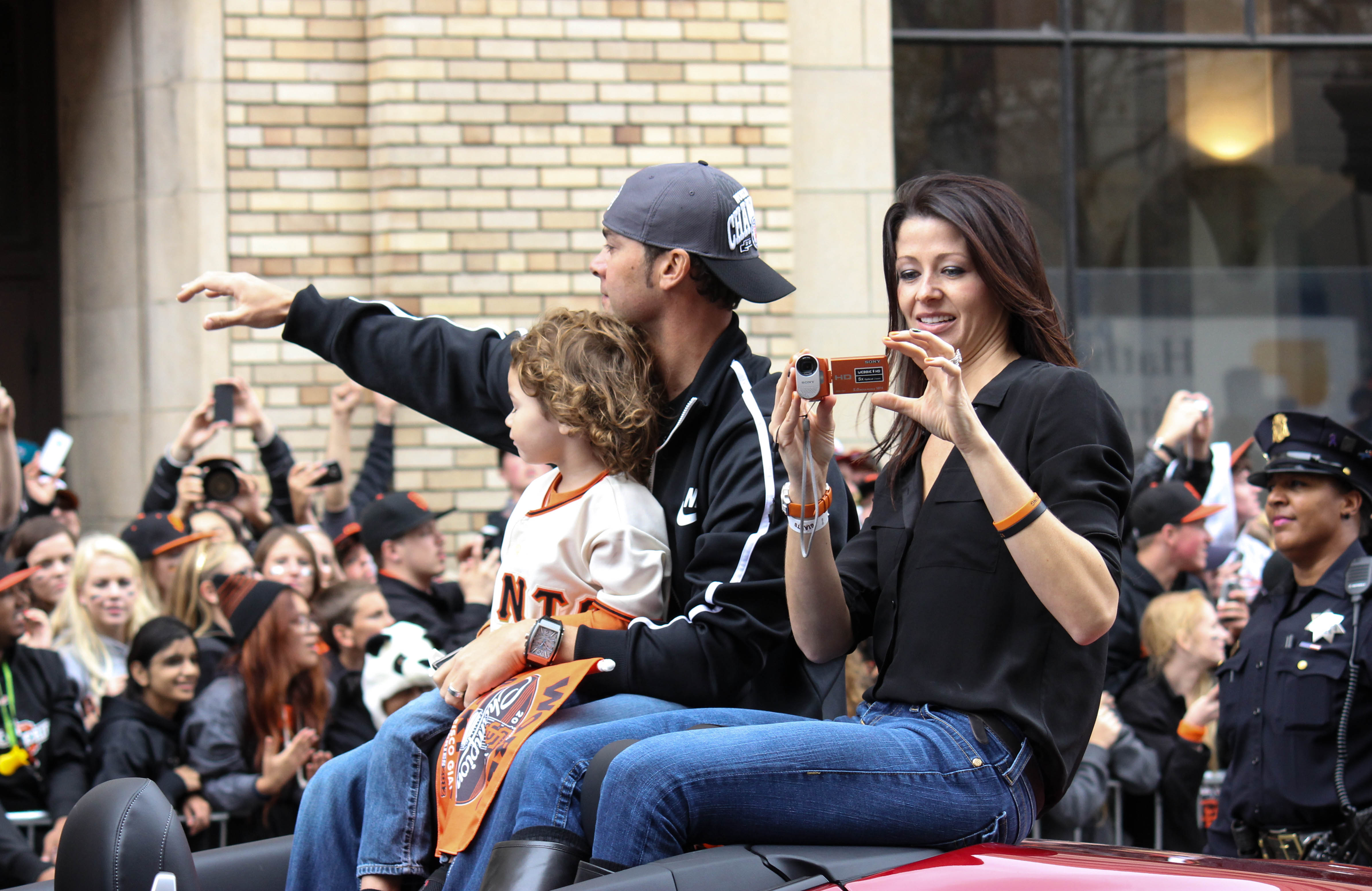
Vogelsong with his family at the 2012 World Series victory parade

During Game 3 of the 2012 World Series in Detroit, the Giants held a surprising 2–0 lead for the first time in the 2012 postseason. Vogelsong again had a strong outing, posting a shutout through 5.2 innings. The Tigers threatened to open the scoring with the bases loaded and one out in the fifth inning, but Vogelsong struck out Quintin Berry and got Miguel Cabrera to pop out to end the threat. The Giants would go on to win Game 3, 2–0, and posted the first back-to-back shutouts since 1966. The Giants went on to sweep the Detroit Tigers 4–0 to win the World Series.

Vogelsong and Barry Zito were the only pitchers to go undefeated in the postseason amongst all Giants' starting pitchers. Vogelsong posted a 3–0 record with a 1.09 ERA, allowing three runs through 24.2 innings, the lowest ERA among all Giants' starting pitchers. Vogelsong's postseason ERA was the best since Orel Hershiser's 1.05 in 1988 (minimum 24 innings). Vogelsong joined Christy Mathewson as the only pitchers to start their postseason careers with four consecutive starts of five or more innings giving up one run or fewer.

==== 2013 ====
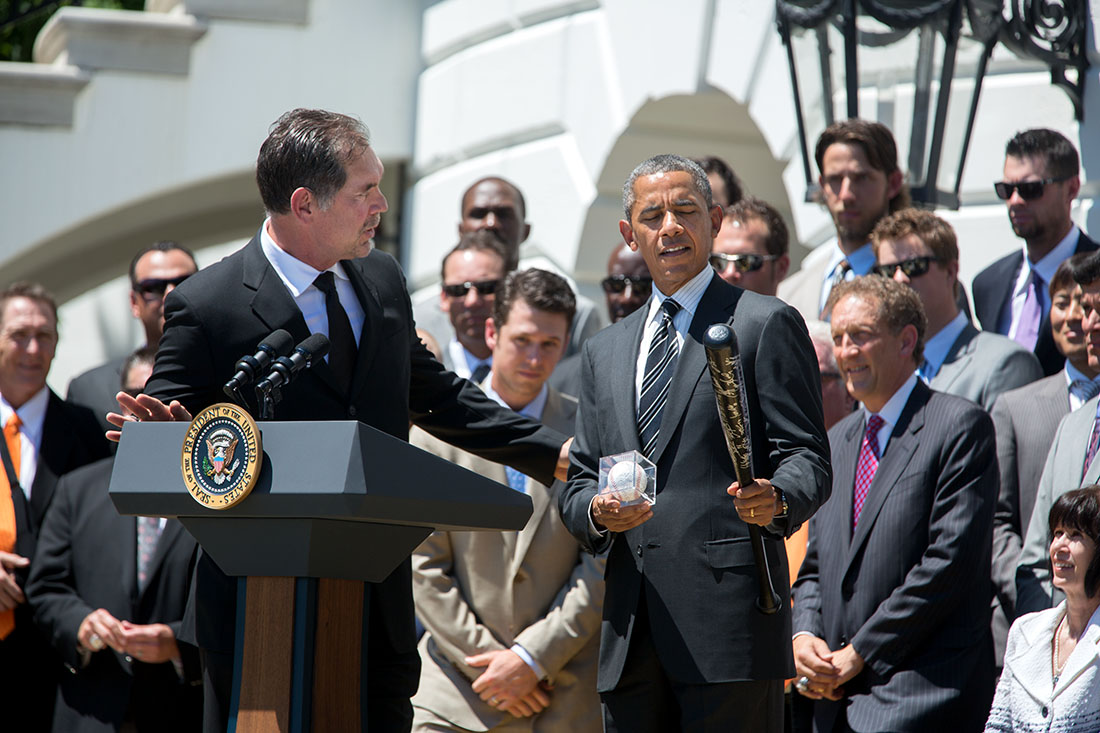
Vogelsong with the Giants outside of the White House being honored by President Barack Obama during a ceremony honoring the team's 2012 World Series championship

Vogelsong began 2013 as the #5 starter in the Giants rotation. His season didn't start out well, where in his first 9 starts, he went 2–4 with a 7.19 ERA and 1 quality start. In a start on May 20 against the Nationals, he was pitching 5 shutout innings when he came to bat against Craig Stammen, who hit him on the hand with a fastball, fracturing two bones and dislocating a joint. Vogelsong missed almost 12 weeks before returning on August 9. He had a strong final two months, lowering his ERA by 1.46. In 19 starts in 2013, Vogelsong went 4–6 with a 5.73 ERA, striking out 67 in 103.2 innings.

On November 4, Vogelsong had his $6.5 million club option declined, and instead was paid a $300,000 buyout. However, the Giants remained interested in negotiating a less-expensive deal with him. Vogelsong agreed to a 1-year, $5 million contract on November 29, 2013, pending the completion of a physical examination. The deal was officially completed on December 4, 2013.

==== 2014 ====
Vogelsong made a career-high 32 starts in 2014, finishing the season 8–13 with a 4.00 ERA, striking out 151 in 184.2 innings. During the postseason, Vogelsong started three games, and although he received three no decisions, the Giants went on to win each game. Vogelsong won his second World Series ring as the Giants defeated the Kansas City Royals four games to three.

==== 2015 ====
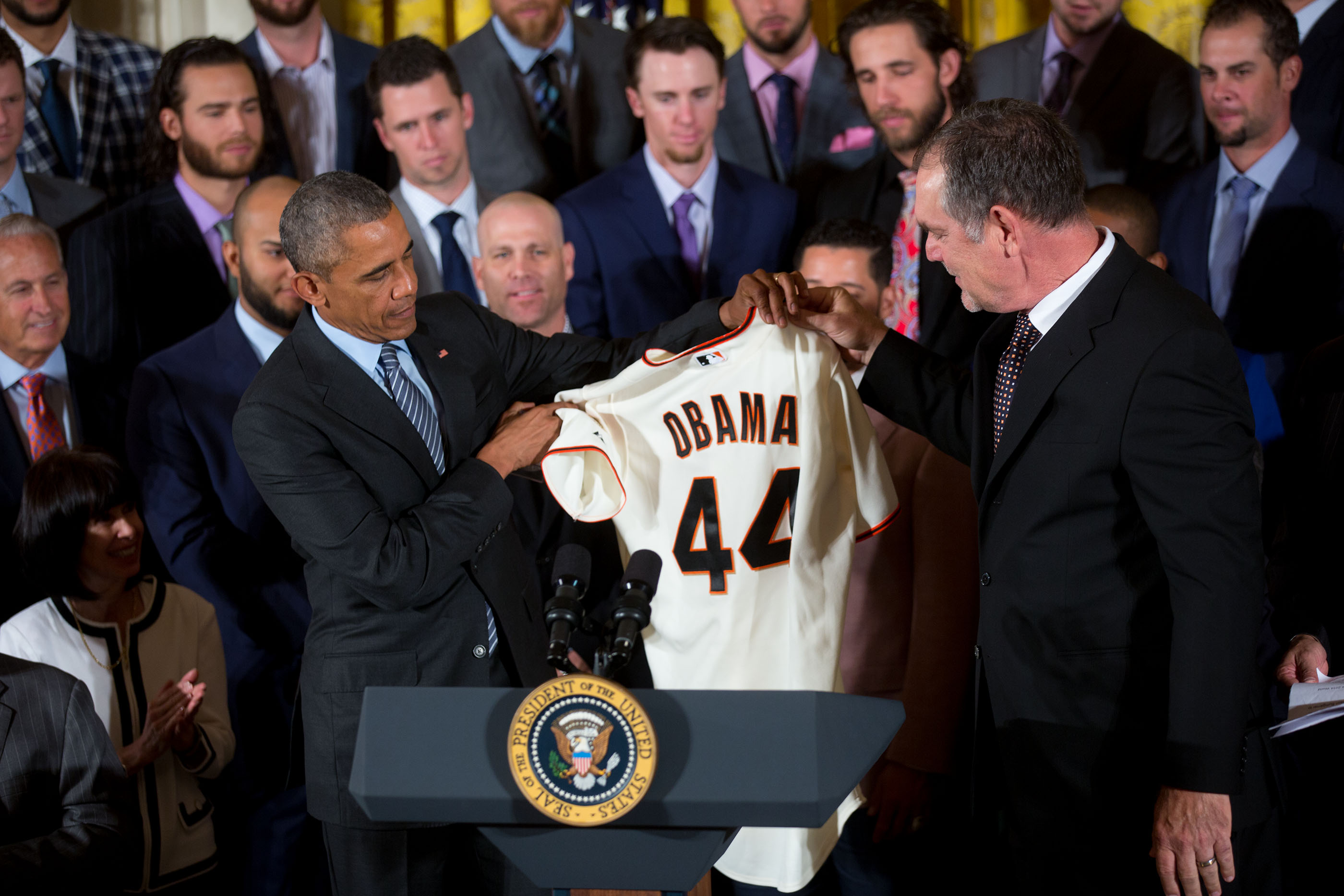
Vogelsong with the Giants inside the White House being honored by President Barack Obama during a ceremony honoring the team's 2014 World Series championship

On January 23, 2015, Vogelsong re-signed with the Giants on a one-year, $4 million contract. On September 3, he hit his first career home run, a 2-run homer off Chris Rusin at Coors Field.

=== Second stint with Pittsburgh Pirates (2016) ===
On December 18, 2015, Vogelsong signed a one-year contract to return to the Pirates for the 2016 season. On May 23, 2016, Vogelsong was hit in the face by a pitch from Colorado Rockies right-hander Jordan Lyles. He suffered damage to his left eye socket, including fractures to the orbital bone. He was subsequently placed on the 15-day disabled list.

=== Minnesota Twins ===
On January 11, 2017, Vogelsong agreed to a minor league contract with the Minnesota Twins, with an invite to spring training. He was released on March 21, 2017 after he struggled to a 7.72 ERA in just 8 innings of spring work.

=== Retirement ===
The Giants held a ceremony on September 17, 2017, before the game at AT&T Park, to officially retire Vogelsong as a Giant.

== Pitcher profile ==
Vogelsong threw a four-seam fastball, two-seam fastball, cut fastball, circle changeup, and curveball. His four seam was thrown around 90–93 mph.

== Awards ==
- Vogelsong was awarded the 2011 Willie Mac Award, given annually to the Giant who best exemplifies the spirit and leadership consistently shown by Willie McCovey throughout McCovey's long career.
- Vogelsong was named Giants Breakout Player of the Year by MLB.com for the 2011 season.

== Personal life ==
Vogelsong married his wife, Nicole, in or around 2006. The couple have a son.

As of September 2019, Vogelsong and his family lived on fifteen acres of land in Suwanee, Georgia where he is neighbors with friends and former Giants teammates Jeff Francoeur, Mark DeRosa and Javier López.
