= 2012 National League Division Series =

American baseball games

Teams
| Team (Wins) | | Manager | Season |
| St. Louis Cardinals (3) | | Mike Matheny | 88–74 (.543), GB: 9 |
| Washington Nationals (2) | | Davey Johnson | 98–64 (.605), GA: 4 |
- Dates: October 7–12
- Television: TBS (Games 1–2, 4–5); MLB Network (Game 3)
- TV announcers: Dick Stockton and Bob Brenly (TBS); Bob Costas and Jim Kaat (MLBN)
- Radio: ESPN
- Radio announcers: Jon Sciambi and Chris Singleton
- Umpires: Joe West (crew chief), Paul Emmel, Ed Hickox, Marvin Hudson, Jim Joyce, Alfonso Marquez

Teams
| Team (Wins) | | Manager | Season |
| San Francisco Giants (3) | | Bruce Bochy | 94–68 (.580), GA: 8 |
| Cincinnati Reds (2) | | Dusty Baker | 97–65 (.599), GA: 9 |
- Dates: October 6–11
- Television: TBS (Games 1, 3–5); TNT (Game 2)
- TV announcers: Brian Anderson, Ron Darling and Joe Simpson
- Radio: ESPN
- Radio announcers: Gary Cohen (Games 1–2), Chris Berman (Games 3–5), and Rick Sutcliffe
- Umpires: Gerry Davis (crew chief), Phil Cuzzi, Chad Fairchild, Tom Hallion, Dan Iassogna, Brian O'Nora
- NLWC: St. Louis Cardinals defeated Atlanta Braves, 6–3

The 2012 National League Division Series were two best-of-five playoff series on the National League side in Major League Baseball’s 2012 postseason to determine the participating teams in the 2012 National League Championship Series. The three divisional winners and a fourth team—the winner of a one-game Wild Card playoff—played in two separate series.

This series with the Washington Nationals was their first playoff berth since moving to Washington, D.C., and the first franchise playoff berth since 1981 when they were the Montreal Expos. TBS carried most of the games, with some on TNT. The Wild Card Game was held on October 5, 2012. The series used the 2–3 format (three consecutive games at home for the team with home field advantage preceded by two consecutive games at home for the other team) for 2012 because Major League Baseball implemented the second wild card slot on March 2, 2012, long after the 2012 regular season schedule had been set, leaving no room for the 2–2–1 format which requires a travel day between Games 4 and 5. The 2–3 format was used for best-of-five Championship Series prior to 1985 and for the Division Series from 1995 to 1997. The matchups for the 2012 NLDS were:

- (1) Washington Nationals (NL East champions) vs. (5) St. Louis Cardinals (Wild Card Game winner): Cardinals won the series 3–2.
- (2) Cincinnati Reds (NL Central champions) vs. (3) San Francisco Giants (NL West champions): Giants won the series 3–2.

Both series saw the first postseason meetings between the respective clubs and both went to the maximum five games.

The Giants went on to defeat the Cardinals in the NLCS, then win the 2012 World Series defeating the American League champion Detroit Tigers. To date, this was the last National League Division Series to not feature the Los Angeles Dodgers.

== Matchups ==
=== Washington Nationals vs. St. Louis Cardinals ===
St. Louis won the series, 3–2.

| Game | Date | Score | Location | Time | Attendance |
|---|---|---|---|---|---|
| 1 | October 7 | Washington Nationals – 3, St. Louis Cardinals – 2 | Busch Stadium | 3:40 | 47,078 |
| 2 | October 8 | Washington Nationals – 4, St. Louis Cardinals – 12 | Busch Stadium | 3:27 | 45,840 |
| 3 | October 10 | St. Louis Cardinals – 8, Washington Nationals – 0 | Nationals Park | 3:32 | 45,017 |
| 4 | October 11 | St. Louis Cardinals – 1, Washington Nationals – 2 | Nationals Park | 2:55 | 44,392 |
| 5 | October 12 | St. Louis Cardinals – 9, Washington Nationals – 7 | Nationals Park | 3:49 | 45,966 |

=== Cincinnati Reds vs. San Francisco Giants ===
San Francisco won the series, 3–2.

| Game | Date | Score | Location | Time | Attendance |
|---|---|---|---|---|---|
| 1 | October 6 | Cincinnati Reds – 5, San Francisco Giants – 2 | AT&T Park | 3:27 | 43,492 |
| 2 | October 7 | Cincinnati Reds – 9, San Francisco Giants – 0 | AT&T Park | 3:14 | 43,505 |
| 3 | October 9 | San Francisco Giants – 2, Cincinnati Reds – 1 (10) | Great American Ball Park | 3:41 | 44,501 |
| 4 | October 10 | San Francisco Giants – 8, Cincinnati Reds – 3 | Great American Ball Park | 3:35 | 44,375 |
| 5 | October 11 | San Francisco Giants – 6, Cincinnati Reds – 4 | Great American Ball Park | 3:52 | 44,142 |

== Washington vs. St. Louis ==
=== Game 1 ===
October 7, 2012 2:07 pm (CDT) at Busch Stadium in St. Louis, Missouri 53 °F (12 °C), partly cloudy
| Team | 1 | 2 | 3 | 4 | 5 | 6 | 7 | 8 | 9 | R | H | E |
|---|---|---|---|---|---|---|---|---|---|---|---|---|
| Washington | 0 | 1 | 0 | 0 | 0 | 0 | 0 | 2 | 0 | 3 | 8 | 2 |
| St. Louis | 0 | 2 | 0 | 0 | 0 | 0 | 0 | 0 | 0 | 2 | 3 | 1 |
WP: Ryan Mattheus (1–0) LP: Mitchell Boggs (0–1) Sv: Drew Storen (1); Attendance: 47,078; Boxscore

The series opened on a sunny afternoon in St. Louis, before 47,078 fans watching the Nationals' first playoff game since October 19, 1981, when they were the Montreal Expos. It was the first time a team from Washington, D.C., played in a postseason contest since the 1933 World Series, when the Washington Senators lost to the Giants.

The Nationals struck first on an RBI single by Kurt Suzuki in the second inning with two on off Adam Wainwright, but the Cardinals responded with two of their own, as 21-game winner Gio González walked three to load the bases, then threw a wild pitch, before walking another to load the bases and allowing a sacrifice fly to Jon Jay, helping St. Louis score without the benefit of a hit.

The score stayed 2–1 until the top of the eighth, when Tyler Moore delivered a two-out, pinch-hit single off Marc Rzepczynski to give the Nationals a 3–2 lead they would not relinquish, both runs charged to Mitchell Boggs, as Tyler Clippard and Drew Storen sealed the deal out of the bullpen for the first playoff win for the franchise in 31 years.

=== Game 2 ===
October 8, 2012 3:37 pm (CDT) at Busch Stadium in St. Louis, Missouri 61 °F (16 °C), partly cloudy
| Team | 1 | 2 | 3 | 4 | 5 | 6 | 7 | 8 | 9 | R | H | E |
|---|---|---|---|---|---|---|---|---|---|---|---|---|
| Washington | 0 | 1 | 0 | 0 | 2 | 0 | 1 | 0 | 0 | 4 | 10 | 2 |
| St. Louis | 0 | 4 | 1 | 2 | 0 | 1 | 0 | 4 | X | 12 | 13 | 0 |
WP: Lance Lynn (1–0) LP: Jordan Zimmermann (0–1); Home runs: WSH: Ryan Zimmerman (1), Adam LaRoche (1); STL: Allen Craig (1), Daniel Descalso (1), Carlos Beltrán 2 (2); Attendance: 45,840; Boxscore

In Game 2, the Nationals struck first in the top of the second on Ryan Zimmerman's RBI single off Jaime Garcia, but after back-to-back leadoff singles in the bottom of the inning off him, David Freese's double and Daniel Descalso's single scored a run each. After a strikeout, Skip Schumaker's groundout and Jon Jay's RBI single made it 4–1 Cardinals. Allen Craig and Descalso hit home runs in the third and fourth off Jordan Zimmermann. Pete Kozma walked in the fourth, moved to third on a sacrifice bunt and scored on an error on Jay's ground ball. Back-to-back home runs by Ryan Zimmerman and Adam LaRoche in the fourth off Lance Lynn made it 7–3 Cardinals. Carlos Beltran's home run in the sixth off Mike Gonzalez made it 8–3. The Nationals scored their last run of the game in the seventh on Zimmernan's sacrifice fly with runners on second and third off Edward Mujica. In the eighth, Komza doubled with one out off Sean Burnett and scored on Jay's two-out triple, then Beltran's second home run of the game made it 11–4. After walking Matt Holliday, Burnett was relieved by Tom Gorzelanny, who allowed an RBI double to Craig. Trevor Rosenthal struck out three of the four batters he faced in the ninth as the Cardinals tied the series with a 12–4 win. Both teams combined to use 13 pitchers, with Lance Lynn working three relief innings to get the win.

=== Game 3 ===
October 10, 2012 1:07 pm (EDT) at Nationals Park in Washington, D.C. 65 °F (18 °C), partly cloudy
| Team | 1 | 2 | 3 | 4 | 5 | 6 | 7 | 8 | 9 | R | H | E |
|---|---|---|---|---|---|---|---|---|---|---|---|---|
| St. Louis | 1 | 3 | 0 | 0 | 0 | 1 | 1 | 2 | 0 | 8 | 14 | 1 |
| Washington | 0 | 0 | 0 | 0 | 0 | 0 | 0 | 0 | 0 | 0 | 7 | 0 |
WP: Chris Carpenter (1–0) LP: Edwin Jackson (0–1); Home runs: STL: Pete Kozma (1); WSH: None; Attendance: 45,017; Boxscore

Washington, D.C.'s first playoff game in 79 years was not a pleasant one for the home team. The Nationals were blown out for the second straight game and left 10 men on base—including the bases loaded in the fifth inning—and didn't even get anyone on in the last three innings. Chris Carpenter ran his postseason record to 10–2 (2.88 ERA) in 16 postseason starts in 100.0 innings, in seventh place for wins, only one behind Curt Schilling (11–2, 2.23 ERA) and Greg Maddux (11–14, 3.27 ERA) for fifth place. He is now tied for fourth place in postseason winning percentage (.833). The Cardinals have won 13 of his 16 starts. He pitched extremely well for St. Louis in only his fourth start since recovering from transplanted nerve surgery on July 19, not starting a game until September 21. He pitched 5 2/3 innings without allowing a run in 106 pitches, his season high.

The Nationals' pitching was shaky. Edwin Jackson surrendered four runs and eight hits in five innings, allowing a two-out single to Matt Holliday in the first and subsequent RBI double to Allen Craig, then a three-run home run to Pete Kozma in the second. The Cardinals added to their lead on Daniel Descalso's sacrifice fly after a hit-by-pitch and double off Craig Stammen, who increased his ERA in the series to 11.57. Christian Garcia walked Yadier Molina with the bases loaded in the seventh to force in another run, and Ryan Mattheus got two outs in the eighth before allowing a single, double, and two-run single to Holliday to give the Cardinals an 8–0 lead. Fernando Salas and Joe Kelly pitched a scoreless eighth and ninth respectively to put the Cardinals one win from the NLCS.

=== Game 4 ===
October 11, 2012 4:07 pm (EDT) at Nationals Park in Washington, D.C. 62 °F (17 °C), sunny
| Team | 1 | 2 | 3 | 4 | 5 | 6 | 7 | 8 | 9 | R | H | E |
|---|---|---|---|---|---|---|---|---|---|---|---|---|
| St. Louis | 0 | 0 | 1 | 0 | 0 | 0 | 0 | 0 | 0 | 1 | 3 | 0 |
| Washington | 0 | 1 | 0 | 0 | 0 | 0 | 0 | 0 | 1 | 2 | 3 | 1 |
WP: Drew Storen (1–0) LP: Lance Lynn (1–1); Home runs: STL: None; WSH: Adam LaRoche (2), Jayson Werth (1); Attendance: 44,392; Boxscore

The Nationals had their backs against the wall in this must-win game. Adam LaRoche provided the first offense of the game with a homer for Washington in the bottom of the second off Kyle Lohse, but the Cardinals manufactured a run in the third inning through a walk, a sacrifice bunt, an error, and a sacrifice fly by Carlos Beltran off Ross Detwiler.

It was 1–1 for the majority of the rest of the game, as both pitching staffs refused to blink. Ross Detwiler pitched very well for the Nationals, tossing six innings while giving up just three hits and one run. The bullpen, in three innings, combined for eight strikeouts—after Detwiler had fanned just three—and did not give up a hit. St. Louis turned in a similar performance, with Kyle Lohse pitching seven strong innings.

In the bottom of the ninth, Jayson Werth, on the 13th pitch of a lead off at-bat against Lance Lynn, lined a homer into left field, giving the Nationals a 2–1 win and forcing a Game 5.

=== Game 5 ===
October 12, 2012 8:37 pm (EDT) at Nationals Park in Washington, D.C. 54 °F (12 °C), clear
| Team | 1 | 2 | 3 | 4 | 5 | 6 | 7 | 8 | 9 | R | H | E |
|---|---|---|---|---|---|---|---|---|---|---|---|---|
| St. Louis | 0 | 0 | 0 | 1 | 2 | 0 | 1 | 1 | 4 | 9 | 11 | 0 |
| Washington | 3 | 0 | 3 | 0 | 0 | 0 | 0 | 1 | 0 | 7 | 11 | 0 |
WP: Jason Motte (1–0) LP: Drew Storen (1–1); Home runs: STL: Daniel Descalso (2); WSH: Ryan Zimmerman (2), Bryce Harper (1), Michael Morse (1); Attendance: 45,966; Boxscore

The Nationals jumped out early on off Adam Wainwright. In the first, Jayson Werth hit a leadoff double and scored on Bryce Harper's triple before Ryan Zimmerman's home run put them up 3–0. Bryce Harper's leadoff home run in the third made it 4–0, then Zimmerman doubled before Michael Morse's home run extended the Nationals' lead to 6–0. With their ace Gio González on the mound, the Nationals appeared headed towards the NLCS.

In the fourth inning, Matt Holliday hit an RBI double after a walk to get the Cardinals on the board. In the fifth, St. Louis scored two more runs on a wild pitch and walk to Allen Craig, but wound up stranding the bases loaded. In the seventh, the Cardinals tacked on another run off Edwin Jackson appearing in relief on two days' rest on Holliday's RBI groundout. The Cardinals continued to chip away at the Nationals' lead when Daniel Descalso homered off Tyler Clippard to make it 6–5 Washington. The Nationals got a much-needed insurance run in the bottom of the eighth on Kurt Suzuki's RBI single off Jason Motte, and sent out Drew Storen, who had recently replaced Clippard as the team's closer, to pitch the ninth.

Storen gave up a leadoff double to Carlos Beltrán, who then advanced to third on a Matt Holliday groundout. Allen Craig then struck out, putting the Nationals one out away from going to the NLCS for the first time in 31 years and giving Washington, D.C., its first postseason series victory since 1924. Yadier Molina, a hero of the 2006 postseason, walked, sending up David Freese as the go-ahead run. Freese, the 2011 World Series MVP, also walked. With the bases loaded, Descalso then hit a single that deflected off the glove of Ian Desmond, scoring Beltrán and pinch-runner Adron Chambers to tie the game at seven, with Freese advancing to third. After Descalso stole second, Pete Kozma hit a single, which scored Freese and Descalso and made it 9–7 St. Louis. Washington went down in order in the bottom of the ninth against Jason Motte to end the series. For the second straight year, St. Louis advanced to the NLCS by virtue of eliminating the team with the Majors' best record in a decisive Game 5.

To date, six runs is the biggest deficit a team has overcome to win a winner-take-all postseason game.

=== Composite line score ===
2012 NLDS (3–2): St. Louis Cardinals over Washington Nationals

| Team | 1 | 2 | 3 | 4 | 5 | 6 | 7 | 8 | 9 | R | H | E |
|---|---|---|---|---|---|---|---|---|---|---|---|---|
| St. Louis Cardinals | 1 | 9 | 2 | 3 | 2 | 2 | 2 | 7 | 4 | 32 | 44 | 2 |
| Washington Nationals | 3 | 3 | 3 | 0 | 2 | 0 | 1 | 3 | 1 | 16 | 39 | 5 |
Total attendance: 228,293 Average attendance: 45,659

== Cincinnati vs. San Francisco ==
=== Game 1 ===
October 6, 2012 6:37 pm (PDT) at AT&T Park in San Francisco, California 62 °F (17 °C), mostly clear
| Team | 1 | 2 | 3 | 4 | 5 | 6 | 7 | 8 | 9 | R | H | E |
|---|---|---|---|---|---|---|---|---|---|---|---|---|
| Cincinnati | 0 | 0 | 2 | 1 | 0 | 0 | 0 | 0 | 2 | 5 | 9 | 1 |
| San Francisco | 0 | 0 | 0 | 0 | 0 | 1 | 0 | 0 | 1 | 2 | 7 | 0 |
WP: Sam LeCure (1–0) LP: Matt Cain (0–1); Home runs: CIN: Brandon Phillips (1), Jay Bruce (1); SF: Buster Posey (1); Attendance: 43,492; Boxscore

Matt Cain and Johnny Cueto faced off against each other for the first time in 2012. Everyone expected a pitchers' duel from the two right-handed aces. In the top of the first, Brandon Belt made an amazing catch, leaping over the fence in foul territory and into the crowd, but holding on for the second out to help Cain pitch a 1–2–3 inning. In the bottom of the first, however, after Cueto struck out Ángel Pagán and then got ahead in the count 0–2 on Marco Scutaro, Cueto left the game with back spasms. Sam LeCure replaced him. LeCure got out of a bases-loaded jam in the second inning by getting Cain to line out to deep right. In the top of the third, Brandon Phillips put the Reds up 2–0 with a two-run home run. After a Jay Bruce home run in the fourth, Buster Posey's home run leading off the sixth off Mat Latos put the Giants on the board. Then, Gregor Blanco bunted with two out. Scott Rolen picked up the ball and threw it away, but Phillips made a great diving stop to keep Blanco off second and the Giants from scoring anymore. In the ninth, the Reds added two runs off Santiago Casilla with two on via an RBI single from Phillips and a passed ball by Posey. In the bottom of the inning, Aroldis Chapman allowed the Giants to load the bases on a single and two walks and threw a two-out wild pitch that allowed a run to score, but struck out Posey to end the game and seal the Reds' 5–2 win to take a 1–0 series lead. This was the first Reds postseason win since 1995, breaking a seven-game losing streak in the postseason.

=== Game 2 ===
October 7, 2012 6:37 pm (PDT) at AT&T Park in San Francisco, California 60 °F (16 °C), partly cloudy
| Team | 1 | 2 | 3 | 4 | 5 | 6 | 7 | 8 | 9 | R | H | E |
|---|---|---|---|---|---|---|---|---|---|---|---|---|
| Cincinnati | 0 | 1 | 0 | 3 | 0 | 0 | 0 | 5 | 0 | 9 | 13 | 0 |
| San Francisco | 0 | 0 | 0 | 0 | 0 | 0 | 0 | 0 | 0 | 0 | 2 | 0 |
WP: Bronson Arroyo (1–0) LP: Madison Bumgarner (0–1); Home runs: CIN: Ryan Ludwick (1); SF: None; Attendance: 43,505; Boxscore

Game 2 was a blowout. Reds starter Bronson Arroyo gave up just two hits in seven innings, while walking one and striking out four. J. J. Hoover and José Arredondo combined for two scoreless innings out of the bullpen.

In contrast, the Giants' pitching was disappointing, as Madison Bumgarner surrendered seven hits and four runs while working just four innings, including a home run by Ryan Ludwick in the second. In the fourth, Bumgarner allowed two leadoff singles, then one out later, an RBI single to Scott Rolen and two-run single to Ryan Hanigan.

Six relievers followed Bumgarner, including Tim Lincecum, who worked two scoreless innings after being demoted to the bullpen, and Guillermo Mota, who surrendered three hits and two runs in just 2/3 of an inning. The Reds put the game out of reach in the eighth when a leadoff single and subsequent walk was followed by Jay Bruce's two-run double off Jose Mijares. After Santiago Casilla got one out, Hanigan's single, Drew Stubbs's triple, and Brandon Phillips's double off Mota scored a run each.

The Giants were now in a two-games-to-none hole, while Cincinnati was just one win away from going to the NLCS for the first time in 17 years, with three chances to clinch the series at home.

=== Game 3 ===
October 9, 2012 5:37 pm (EDT) at Great American Ball Park in Cincinnati, Ohio 60 °F (16 °C), mostly clear
| Team | 1 | 2 | 3 | 4 | 5 | 6 | 7 | 8 | 9 | 10 | R | H | E |
|---|---|---|---|---|---|---|---|---|---|---|---|---|---|
| San Francisco | 0 | 0 | 1 | 0 | 0 | 0 | 0 | 0 | 0 | 1 | 2 | 3 | 0 |
| Cincinnati | 1 | 0 | 0 | 0 | 0 | 0 | 0 | 0 | 0 | 0 | 1 | 4 | 1 |
WP: Sergio Romo (1–0) LP: Jonathan Broxton (0–1); Attendance: 44,501; Boxscore

In contrast to Game 2's blowout, Game 3 was a tightly contested affair that came down right to the wire.

Cincinnati attacked first on Jay Bruce's RBI single in the first inning off Ryan Vogelsong, scoring Zack Cozart. That would be practically it for the Reds' offense, as the Giants' pitching composed themselves to give up just one hit the rest of the way.

Homer Bailey, who had pitched a no-hitter just two starts before, was flirting with another one, not giving up a hit through 5 2/3 innings before Marco Scutaro broke it up with a two-strike single. That was the only hit the Giants would get in regulation, as Bailey was brilliant, pitching seven innings while striking out ten. However, the Giants still managed to score a run in the third inning with a hit by pitch, a walk, a sacrifice bunt, and a sacrifice fly.

Neither team came close to scoring after that until the 10th inning, when Buster Posey and Hunter Pence got back to back singles to kick off the inning. Jonathan Broxton settled down after that to strike out the next two hitters. After the runners advanced on a passed ball, the usually sure-handed Scott Rolen bobbled a ground ball hit by Joaquín Árias, allowing Posey to score. The Reds went down quietly in the 10th inning as the Giants avoided the sweep.

=== Game 4 ===
October 10, 2012 4:07 pm (EDT) at Great American Ball Park in Cincinnati, Ohio 56 °F (13 °C), mostly sunny
| Team | 1 | 2 | 3 | 4 | 5 | 6 | 7 | 8 | 9 | R | H | E |
|---|---|---|---|---|---|---|---|---|---|---|---|---|
| San Francisco | 1 | 2 | 0 | 0 | 2 | 0 | 3 | 0 | 0 | 8 | 11 | 1 |
| Cincinnati | 1 | 0 | 1 | 0 | 0 | 1 | 0 | 0 | 0 | 3 | 9 | 0 |
WP: Tim Lincecum (1–0) LP: Mike Leake (0–1); Home runs: SF: Ángel Pagán (1), Gregor Blanco (1), Pablo Sandoval (1); CIN: Ryan Ludwick (2); Attendance: 44,375; Boxscore

In Game 4, needing another win to keep their season alive, the Giants' offense finally came to life. Ángel Pagán hit the second pitch of the night, from emergency starter Mike Leake, over the right field wall for a lead-off home run, the first in Giants postseason history. Pitching for the Giants, Barry Zito struggled early, allowing a two-out single to Joey Votto, then walking three consecutive Reds hitters in the bottom of the first to force in a run. In the second inning, Gregor Blanco hit a two-run home run to give the Giants a 3–1 lead. Zito continued to struggle, needing 76 pitches to complete just under three innings of work and allowing a home run to Ryan Ludwick in the third that made it 3–2 Giants. George Kontos relieved Zito that inning. In the fifth, Back-to-back doubles by Joaquín Árias and Pagán off Leake, followed by a Pablo Sandoval sacrifice fly off Sam LeCure gave the Giants a 5–2 lead. Tim Lincecum struck out six batters in 4 1/3 innings for the Giants, ultimately getting the win. In the bottom of the sixth, Drew Stubbs hit a leadoff double off Lincecum, moved to third on a groundout and scored on Brandon Phillips's sacrifice fly, but in the seventh, Arias hit a leadoff double off Jose Arredondo, then scored on Marco Scutaro's double before Sandoval's two-run home run made it 8–3 Giants. Santiago Casilla closed out the game, and the Giants avoided elimination for the second straight night, setting up a decisive Game 5.

=== Game 5 ===
October 11, 2012 1:07 pm (EDT) at Great American Ball Park in Cincinnati, Ohio 54 °F (12 °C), sunny
| Team | 1 | 2 | 3 | 4 | 5 | 6 | 7 | 8 | 9 | R | H | E |
|---|---|---|---|---|---|---|---|---|---|---|---|---|
| San Francisco | 0 | 0 | 0 | 0 | 6 | 0 | 0 | 0 | 0 | 6 | 9 | 1 |
| Cincinnati | 0 | 0 | 0 | 0 | 2 | 1 | 0 | 0 | 1 | 4 | 12 | 1 |
WP: Matt Cain (1–1) LP: Mat Latos (0–1) Sv: Sergio Romo (1); Home runs: SF: Buster Posey (2); CIN: Ryan Ludwick (3); Attendance: 44,142; Boxscore

The Reds' Mat Latos and the Giants' Matt Cain were locked in a pitchers' duel for four innings. In the top of the fifth, Brandon Crawford tripled home Gregor Blanco, who singled to lead off, to open the scoring. Angel Pagan then reached on an error by Zack Cozart, allowing Crawford to score the second run of the inning. After a walk to Scutaro, Sandoval singled to load the bases. Buster Posey then crushed a 2–2 pitch from Latos off the facing of the second deck for a grand slam and a 6–0 lead. The Reds slowly chipped away the lead. In the bottom of the fifth, a hit-by-pitch and single was followed by Brandon Phillips's two-run double. Next inning, Ryan Ludwick's leadoff home run made it 6–3. In the ninth, a one-out walk and single was followed by Ludwik's RBI single. The Reds brought the tying run to the plate in the sixth, seventh, and eighth innings, and the winning run to the plate in the ninth inning. With two men on and the Giants clinging to a two-run lead, Sergio Romo retired Jay Bruce on a harmless fly ball to left after a 12-pitch duel. Romo then settled down and struck out Scott Rolen (in what would be the final at-bat of his Hall of Fame career) to give the Giants the victory. The Giants became the second National League team to rally from an 0–2 Division Series deficit to advance to the Championship Series (the other being the 1981 Los Angeles Dodgers) and first in Major League Baseball to advance by winning three games on the road. Cincinnati joined the 1984 Chicago Cubs and 1981 Houston Astros as the only National League teams to blow a 2–0 lead in a best–of–five series. This series also joined the 2010 ALDS matchup between the Texas Rangers and the Tampa Bay Rays as the second MLB postseason series in which the road team won every game. The Reds to date have yet to win a postseason game at Great American Ball Park (0–4) and a six-game home losing streak in the postseason, losing their last two at Riverfront Stadium/Cinergy Field in the 1995 NLCS.

=== Composite line score ===
2012 NLDS (3–2): San Francisco Giants over Cincinnati Reds

| Team | 1 | 2 | 3 | 4 | 5 | 6 | 7 | 8 | 9 | 10 | R | H | E |
|---|---|---|---|---|---|---|---|---|---|---|---|---|---|
| San Francisco Giants | 1 | 2 | 1 | 0 | 8 | 1 | 3 | 0 | 1 | 1 | 18 | 32 | 2 |
| Cincinnati Reds | 2 | 1 | 3 | 4 | 2 | 2 | 0 | 5 | 3 | 0 | 22 | 47 | 3 |
Total attendance: 220,015 Average attendance: 44,003

== See also ==
- 2012 American League Division Series
