= 2012 National League Championship Series =

| Team (Wins) | Managers | Season |
|---|---|---|
| San Francisco Giants (4) | Bruce Bochy | 94–68 (.580), GA: 8 |
| St. Louis Cardinals (3) | Mike Matheny | 88–74 (.543), GB: 9 |
- Dates: October 14–22
- MVP: Marco Scutaro (San Francisco)
- Umpires: Gary Darling (crew chief), Chris Guccione, Bill Miller, Greg Gibson, Ted Barrett, Jerry Layne

Broadcast
- Television: Fox
- TV announcers: Joe Buck, Tim McCarver, Ken Rosenthal, and Erin Andrews
- Radio: ESPN
- Radio announcers: Jon Sciambi and Chris Singleton
- NLDS: St. Louis Cardinals over Washington Nationals (3–2); San Francisco Giants over Cincinnati Reds (3–2)

The 2012 National League Championship Series was a best-of-seven playoff in Major League Baseball’s 2012 postseason pitting the third-seeded San Francisco Giants against the defending World Series champion and fifth-seeded St. Louis Cardinals for the National League pennant and the right to play in the 2012 World Series. The series, the 43rd NLCS in league history, began Sunday, October 14, and ended Monday, October 22, with Fox airing all games in the United States. In shades of the 1996 NLCS, a series where the Cardinals blew a 3–1 series lead where they were outscored 32–1 over the final three games, the Giants came back from a 3–1 deficit and outscored the Cardinals, 20–1, over the final three games to win the series, 4–3.

This was the third postseason meeting between the Giants and the Cardinals and also marked the first time in MLB history since the creation of the League Championship Series in 1969 that the last two World Series champions faced off against each other for the pennant. The Giants won in 2010 while the Cardinals won in 2011. Coincidentally, the previous two postseason meetings between the two teams occurred in the NLCS, which both ended on October 14 (the day of 2012's Game 1): the Cardinals won Game 7 of the 1987 NLCS, and the Giants triumphed in the pennant-clinching Game 5 of the 2002 NLCS.

The Giants would go on to sweep the Detroit Tigers in the World Series in four games.

== Summary ==
=== San Francisco Giants vs. St. Louis Cardinals ===
San Francisco won the series, 4–3.

| Game | Date | Score | Location | Time | Attendance |
|---|---|---|---|---|---|
| 1 | October 14 | St. Louis Cardinals – 6, San Francisco Giants – 4 | AT&T Park | 3:21 | 42,534 |
| 2 | October 15 | St. Louis Cardinals – 1, San Francisco Giants – 7 | AT&T Park | 3:10 | 42,679 |
| 3 | October 17 | San Francisco Giants – 1, St. Louis Cardinals – 3 | Busch Stadium | 3:02 (3:28 rain delay) | 45,850 |
| 4 | October 18 | San Francisco Giants – 3, St. Louis Cardinals – 8 | Busch Stadium | 3:17 | 47,062 |
| 5 | October 19 | San Francisco Giants – 5, St. Louis Cardinals – 0 | Busch Stadium | 3:03 | 47,075 |
| 6 | October 21 | St. Louis Cardinals – 1, San Francisco Giants – 6 | AT&T Park | 2:55 | 43,070 |
| 7 | October 22 | St. Louis Cardinals – 0, San Francisco Giants – 9 | AT&T Park | 3:35 | 43,056 |

== Game summaries ==
=== Game 1 ===
October 14, 2012 5:15 pm (PDT) at AT&T Park in San Francisco, California 61 °F (16 °C), mostly sunny
| Team | 1 | 2 | 3 | 4 | 5 | 6 | 7 | 8 | 9 | R | H | E |
|---|---|---|---|---|---|---|---|---|---|---|---|---|
| St. Louis | 0 | 2 | 0 | 4 | 0 | 0 | 0 | 0 | 0 | 6 | 8 | 0 |
| San Francisco | 0 | 0 | 0 | 4 | 0 | 0 | 0 | 0 | 0 | 4 | 7 | 1 |
WP: Edward Mujica (1–0) LP: Madison Bumgarner (0–1) Sv: Jason Motte (1); Home runs: STL: David Freese (1), Carlos Beltrán (1); SF: None; Attendance: 42,534; Boxscore

The Cardinals scored first in the second inning, with a Yadier Molina single followed by a two-run home run by David Freese. In the fourth inning, Daniel Descalso doubled and scored on a Pete Kozma double; Kozma then stole third base during Lance Lynn's at-bat and scored on a Jon Jay single. With Jay on first, Carlos Beltrán hit a two-run home run to give the Cardinals a 6–0 lead; Giants starting pitcher Madison Bumgarner was then replaced by George Kontos, who got Matt Holliday to pop out to end the inning.

The Giants rallied back against Cardinals starting pitcher Lance Lynn in the bottom half of the fourth inning. Lynn gave up a leadoff single to Marco Scutaro, who later advanced to third on a Hunter Pence single and scored on a Brandon Belt single that also advanced Pence to third. Gregor Blanco then tripled to score Pence and Belt, and Brandon Crawford doubled to score Blanco, which cut the Cardinals' lead to 6–4. Lynn was then replaced by Joe Kelly, who got Ángel Pagán to ground into a force play to end the inning.

Neither team's bullpen allowed a run for the rest of the game; additionally, the Giants' bullpen did not allow a runner into scoring position over 5 1/3 innings, while the Cardinals' bullpen only allowed one runner to advance into scoring position over the same number of innings. Cardinals reliever Edward Mujica earned the win.

=== Game 2 ===
October 15, 2012 5:07 pm (PDT) at AT&T Park in San Francisco, California 66 °F (19 °C), clear
| Team | 1 | 2 | 3 | 4 | 5 | 6 | 7 | 8 | 9 | R | H | E |
|---|---|---|---|---|---|---|---|---|---|---|---|---|
| St. Louis | 0 | 1 | 0 | 0 | 0 | 0 | 0 | 0 | 0 | 1 | 5 | 2 |
| San Francisco | 1 | 0 | 0 | 4 | 0 | 0 | 0 | 2 | X | 7 | 12 | 0 |
WP: Ryan Vogelsong (1–0) LP: Chris Carpenter (0–1); Home runs: STL: None; SF: Ángel Pagán (1); Attendance: 42,679; Boxscore

Cardinals starter Chris Carpenter gave up a home run to the leadoff hitter Ángel Pagán to give the Giants an early one-run lead. The lead was short-lived, however, as Carpenter hit a double in the top of the second inning that scored Pete Kozma, who walked with two outs. The game remained tied until the bottom of the fourth inning, when the Giants scored four runs, three of which were unearned amid two Cardinals errors. Brandon Belt hit a double off Carpenter and advanced to third on Gregor Blanco's single. Brandon Crawford then reached first base on a throwing error by first baseman Allen Craig; Belt scored on the play and Blanco advanced to second. Crawford and Blanco then advanced to second and third, respectively, on Vogelsong's sacrifice bunt, and Pagán was walked to load the bases. Marco Scutaro—who had been involved in a collision with Cardinals left fielder Matt Holliday in the first inning in what some termed a "questionable" slide into second base—then hit a single to left field that went between Holliday's legs, allowing Blanco, Crawford, and Pagán to score.

The Giants padded their lead in the eighth inning when Ryan Theriot hit a two-RBI single with the bases loaded off Shelby Miller, scoring Blanco and Aubrey Huff. Ryan Vogelsong pitched seven innings while Jeremy Affeldt and Sergio Romo pitched a scoreless eighth and ninth, respectively, as the Giants' 7–1 win tied the series heading to St. Louis.

=== Game 3 ===
October 17, 2012 3:07 pm (CDT) at Busch Stadium in St. Louis, Missouri 67 °F (19 °C), overcast
| Team | 1 | 2 | 3 | 4 | 5 | 6 | 7 | 8 | 9 | R | H | E |
|---|---|---|---|---|---|---|---|---|---|---|---|---|
| San Francisco | 0 | 0 | 1 | 0 | 0 | 0 | 0 | 0 | 0 | 1 | 9 | 1 |
| St. Louis | 0 | 0 | 2 | 0 | 0 | 0 | 1 | 0 | X | 3 | 6 | 0 |
WP: Kyle Lohse (1–0) LP: Matt Cain (0–1) Sv: Jason Motte (2); Home runs: SF: None; STL: Matt Carpenter (1); Attendance: 45,850; Boxscore

The Giants scored first in the third inning. Ángel Pagán singled to lead off the inning, advanced to third on a Marco Scutaro double, then scored on a Pablo Sandoval groundout. The Cardinals took the lead in the bottom half of that inning, when Matt Carpenter—who had replaced Carlos Beltrán due to injury in the first inning—hit a two-run home run. Giants starter Matt Cain only allowed one baserunner over the next three innings, but the Cardinals got an insurance run in the seventh inning. After David Freese doubled with one out, Cain intentionally walked Daniel Descalso. Pete Kozma then singled to load the bases. Shane Robinson then grounded out, scoring Freese on the play.

After Robinson grounded out, there was a 3-hour-and-28-minute rain delay. When the game resumed—with Kozma and Descalso still on base—Javier López replaced Cain and got Jon Jay to ground out to end the inning. Cardinals starter Kyle Lohse earned the win with 5 2/3 innings, allowing just the one run, while Jason Motte pitched two perfect innings for the Cardinals to earn his third save of the postseason.

=== Game 4 ===
October 18, 2012 7:07 pm (CDT) at Busch Stadium in St. Louis, Missouri 57 °F (14 °C), overcast
| Team | 1 | 2 | 3 | 4 | 5 | 6 | 7 | 8 | 9 | R | H | E |
|---|---|---|---|---|---|---|---|---|---|---|---|---|
| San Francisco | 0 | 1 | 0 | 0 | 0 | 0 | 0 | 0 | 2 | 3 | 6 | 1 |
| St. Louis | 2 | 0 | 0 | 0 | 2 | 2 | 2 | 0 | X | 8 | 12 | 0 |
WP: Adam Wainwright (1–0) LP: Tim Lincecum (0–1); Home runs: SF: Hunter Pence (1), Pablo Sandoval (1); STL: None; Attendance: 47,062; Boxscore

The second-largest crowd of the year at Busch, 47,062, saw their Redbirds win, 8–3, without the benefit of a home run. Adam Wainwright went seven strong innings, giving up only four hits and one run, a homer to Hunter Pence, walking none and striking out five, while Tim Lincecum gave up four runs in 4 2/3 innings. The Cardinals struck first in the bottom of the first when Jon Jay hit a leadoff single and Matt Carpenter walked. Matt Holliday's RBI single and Allen Craig's sacrifice fly put St. Louis up 2–0. Carpenter doubled in the fifth and scored on Holliday's single with Holliday advancing to second on the throw to home. One out later, Yadier Molina's RBI single made it 4–1 Cardinals. Next inning, Daniel Descalso and Pete Kozma hit back-to-back leadoff singles off George Kontos. After a sacrifice bunt, Jay's two-run double off Jose Mijares made it 6–1 Cardinals. Next inning, Craig hit a leadoff single off Guillermo Mota and scored on Molina's double. Two outs later, Molina scored on Kozma's single off Jeremy Affeldt. Fernando Salas pitched two innings in relief of Wainwright and, despite allowing a two-run home run to Pablo Sandoval in the ninth, held the Cardinals' lead to put them one win away from the World Series.

=== Game 5 ===
October 19, 2012 7:07 pm (CDT) at Busch Stadium in St. Louis, Missouri 52 °F (11 °C), cloudy
| Team | 1 | 2 | 3 | 4 | 5 | 6 | 7 | 8 | 9 | R | H | E |
|---|---|---|---|---|---|---|---|---|---|---|---|---|
| San Francisco | 0 | 0 | 0 | 4 | 0 | 0 | 0 | 1 | 0 | 5 | 6 | 0 |
| St. Louis | 0 | 0 | 0 | 0 | 0 | 0 | 0 | 0 | 0 | 0 | 7 | 1 |
WP: Barry Zito (1–0) LP: Lance Lynn (0–1); Home runs: SF: Pablo Sandoval (2); STL: None; Attendance: 47,075; Boxscore

The Cardinals had runners on second and third with no outs early in the bottom of the second inning. Giants starting pitcher Barry Zito retired Daniel Descalso and intentionally walked Pete Kozma to bring Cardinals starting pitcher Lance Lynn to the plate. Lynn grounded into a double play, and Zito escaped the jam.

Just as he had done in Game 1, Lynn pitched three scoreless innings but then gave up four runs and could not finish the fourth inning. In that inning, with one out and Marco Scutaro and Pablo Sandoval on base after two singles, Hunter Pence grounded back to Lynn, whose throw to second base to force Sandoval hit the bag and bounced into center field, allowing Scutaro to score. After another out and a walk, Brandon Crawford hit a two-RBI single, and then Zito scored another run with a bunt single. Lynn was then relieved by Joe Kelly, who finished the inning with a strikeout. Sandoval extended the Giants' lead with a home run in the top of the eighth off Mitchell Boggs.

Zito pitched shutout ball into the bottom of the eighth inning, and the final four outs were recorded by Santiago Casilla and Sergio Romo as the Giants' 5–0 win forced a Game 6 in San Francisco.

=== Game 6 ===
October 21, 2012 4:45 pm (PDT) at AT&T Park in San Francisco, California 60 °F (16 °C), partly cloudy
| Team | 1 | 2 | 3 | 4 | 5 | 6 | 7 | 8 | 9 | R | H | E |
|---|---|---|---|---|---|---|---|---|---|---|---|---|
| St. Louis | 0 | 0 | 0 | 0 | 0 | 1 | 0 | 0 | 0 | 1 | 5 | 1 |
| San Francisco | 1 | 4 | 0 | 0 | 0 | 0 | 0 | 1 | X | 6 | 9 | 1 |
WP: Ryan Vogelsong (2–0) LP: Chris Carpenter (0–2); Attendance: 43,070; Boxscore

Strong pitching by starting pitcher Ryan Vogelsong helped the Giants to a 6–1 victory. The Giants became the first team since the 2008 Boston Red Sox to come back from a 3–1 deficit to tie the series (although the 2008 Red Sox would lose Game 7), and first in the National League since the 2003 Florida Marlins.

After Marco Scutaro drew a one-out walk in the first, Pablo Sandoval doubled over the head of Jon Jay as the center fielder got turned around fighting the sun and shadows during the twilight start. Scutaro scored on Posey's groundout to third to give the Giants a 1–0 lead and the NL batting champion his first RBI of the series. Brandon Belt tripled to right-center leading off the second. Gregor Blanco struck out swinging and Brandon Crawford was intentionally walked. With Crawford trying to steal second on the pitch, Vogelsong chopped a ball that shortstop Pete Kozma could not handle as Belt scored. One out later, Scutaro doubled to left to score and Sandoval singled on the 10th pitch from Chris Carpenter to score Scutaro to put the Giants ahead 5–0.

Ryan Vogelsong exceeded his career high by one with nine strikeouts, and the San Francisco Giants took a 5–1 lead over the St. Louis Cardinals through six innings. The only baserunner Vogelsong allowed was a one-out walk to Matt Carpenter in the first, until Daniel Descalso's broken-bat single to center with two outs in the fifth. Pete Kozma also singled before Vogelsong got pinch-hitter Skip Schumaker to ground out to first. Allen Craig's single in the sixth drove home Carlos Beltrán, who doubled with two outs, for the Cardinals' only run.

Chris Carpenter was replaced after allowing six hits and five runs, three unearned, in four innings. He walked two and struck out six. Matt Carpenter replaced Matt Holliday at first base in the St. Louis lineup and batted second when the left fielder was scratched about 45 minutes before first pitch because of lower back tightness. Allen Craig shifted from first to left field, and Beltrán slid back a spot to third in the batting order, while playing right field.

The Giants got one more run in the eighth on Ryan Theriot's RBI single off Edward Mujica with two on, the run charged to Mark Rzepczynski.

The 10 unearned runs allowed by the Cardinals in the series were the most in NLCS history, according to STATS LLC.

=== Game 7 ===
October 22, 2012 5:07 pm (PDT) at AT&T Park in San Francisco, California 62 °F (17 °C), partly cloudy
| Team | 1 | 2 | 3 | 4 | 5 | 6 | 7 | 8 | 9 | R | H | E |
|---|---|---|---|---|---|---|---|---|---|---|---|---|
| St. Louis | 0 | 0 | 0 | 0 | 0 | 0 | 0 | 0 | 0 | 0 | 7 | 2 |
| San Francisco | 1 | 1 | 5 | 0 | 0 | 0 | 1 | 1 | X | 9 | 14 | 0 |
WP: Matt Cain (1–1) LP: Kyle Lohse (1–1); Home runs: STL: None; SF: Brandon Belt (1); Attendance: 43,056; Boxscore

Game 7 featured a rematch of Game 3 starters Matt Cain and Kyle Lohse.

The Giants took an early lead in the first inning after consecutive singles by Ángel Pagán and Marco Scutaro followed by a Pablo Sandoval RBI groundout. However, the Cardinals threatened in the second inning with runners on second and third and two outs. Cain ended the threat by inducing a Lohse line-out to a leaping Brandon Crawford. The Giants added insurance in the bottom of the second after a Cain RBI single, marking the third consecutive game in which a Giants pitcher had batted in a run.

The Giants jumped on Lohse in the bottom of the third, and the Cardinal starter's night was ended after he proceeded to give up a single to Scutaro, a double to Sandoval, and a walk to Posey to load the bases. Against Joe Kelly, Hunter Pence then hit an odd double that somehow made contact with his broken bat three times, causing it to unexpectedly knuckle away from and past the shortstop Pete Kozma. Scutaro and Sandoval scored, and center fielder Jon Jay misplayed the ball in center field, allowing Posey to score. After a single and walk reloaded the bases, Crawford and Pagán hit into fielder's choice plays to give the Giants a 7–0 lead. Finally, Sandoval lined out to first baseman Allen Craig to end the five-run third.

Cain went 5 2/3 innings without giving up a run, and the bullpen would continue to shut out the Cardinals. A run-scoring double play by Aubrey Huff off Mitchell Boggs in the seventh inning and a home run by Brandon Belt in the eighth off Jason Motte added to the onslaught as the Giants surged ahead 9–0. Under a steady downpour in the ninth inning, reliever Javier López notched the first two outs, but was lifted after two walks. In the sloppy conditions, closer Sergio Romo then allowed both runners to reach scoring position with a wild pitch, but ultimately got Matt Holliday to pop out to Scutaro to win the series for San Francisco.

The victory marked the first time the Giants had ever won a postseason Game 7, having previously lost Game 7 of the 1912 World Series, the 1924 World Series, the 1962 World Series, the 1987 National League Championship Series and the 2002 World Series. It was also the second time in three games that the Giants staff had tossed a shutout; the Cardinals scored only one run over the final 28 innings of the series. San Francisco also became the second club in MLB history to win six elimination games in one postseason, following the 1985 Kansas City Royals. The Cardinals became the first team in MLB history to play in three winner-take-all postseason games in the same year. Meanwhile, the Giants became the first team to win both a winner-take-all Game 5 of the Division Series and a winner-take-all Game 7 in a League Championship Series in the same year.

With three hits in the game, Series MVP Marco Scutaro finished 14-for-28 batting, tying the LCS record for hits.

Nielsen ratings showed that 31.8% of households in the St. Louis area watched the game compared with 27.5 in the San Francisco Bay Area. Nationally, Nielsen found that 8.1 million viewers saw this game, a 4.9% share of households. The rating peaked at 5.8 at 7:30 p.m. (Central Time Zone) before declining as viewers switched to Monday Night Football or the presidential debate.

To date, this is the last and only Game 7 played at AT&T Park (now named Oracle Park).

== Composite line score ==
2012 NLCS (4–3): San Francisco Giants over St. Louis Cardinals

| Team | 1 | 2 | 3 | 4 | 5 | 6 | 7 | 8 | 9 | R | H | E |
|---|---|---|---|---|---|---|---|---|---|---|---|---|
| St. Louis Cardinals | 2 | 3 | 2 | 4 | 2 | 3 | 3 | 0 | 0 | 19 | 50 | 6 |
| San Francisco Giants | 3 | 6 | 6 | 12 | 0 | 0 | 1 | 5 | 2 | 35 | 63 | 4 |
Total attendance: 311,326 Average attendance: 44,475
