= Pete Kozma =

American baseball player (born 1988)

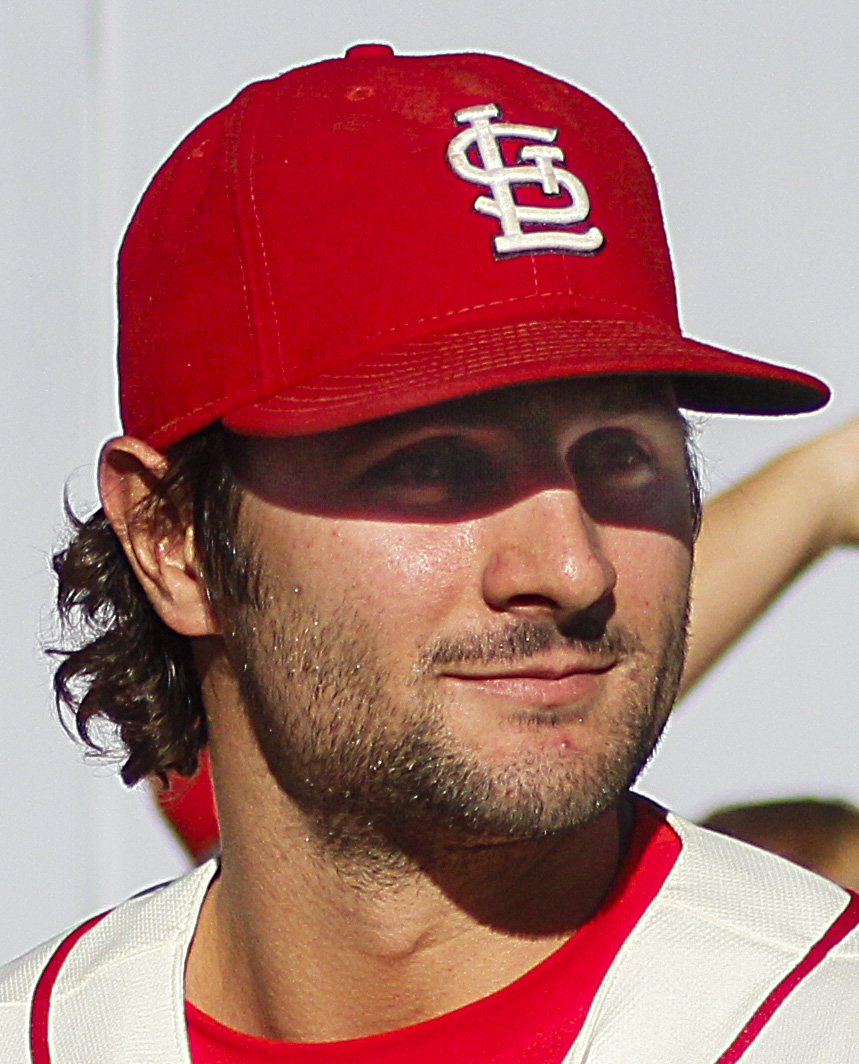
- Kozma with the St. Louis Cardinals
- Shortstop
- Born: April 11, 1988 (age 38); Tulsa, Oklahoma, U.S.
- Batted: Right Threw: Right

MLB debut
- May 18, 2011, for the St. Louis Cardinals

Last MLB appearance
- October 3, 2021, for the Oakland Athletics

MLB statistics
- Batting average: .213
- Home runs: 5
- Runs batted in: 62
- Stats at Baseball Reference

Teams
- St. Louis Cardinals (2011–2015); New York Yankees (2017); Texas Rangers (2017); Detroit Tigers (2018); Oakland Athletics (2021)

Peter Michael Kozma (born April 11, 1988) is an American former professional baseball shortstop. He played in Major League Baseball (MLB) for the St. Louis Cardinals, New York Yankees, Texas Rangers, Detroit Tigers, and Oakland Athletics. The Cardinals selected him in the first round of the 2007 MLB draft from Owasso High School in Oklahoma, and he made his MLB debut for them in 2011.

Kozma was considered a sure-handed defender with excellent range and throwing arm. In the decisive fifth game of the 2012 National League Division Series against the Washington Nationals, he had the game-winning hit in the 9th inning, completing the Cardinals' comeback from a six-run deficit.

== Early life ==
Kozma was born in Tulsa, Oklahoma. His father, Bob “Buckey” Kozma, played Triple-A baseball, and his mother, Janet, played softball. He attended Owasso High School in Owasso, Oklahoma, and played for the school's baseball team. He was named to USA Today's All-USA high school baseball second team.

== Professional career ==
=== St. Louis Cardinals ===
The St. Louis Cardinals selected Kozma in the first round, with the 18th overall selection, of the 2007 Major League Baseball draft. In his first professional season, Kozma played for three minor league teams: the Johnson City Cardinals (30 games), GCL Cardinals (four games) and Batavia Muckdogs (eight games). Overall, he hit .233 with two home runs and 11 runs batted in (RBIs) in 42 games that season.

Kozma played for the Quad Cities River Bandits (99 games) and Palm Beach Cardinals (24 games) in 2008, hitting a combined .258 with five home runs and 50 RBI in 123 games. He also stole 12 bases in 18 attempts.

In 2009, Kozma split the season between Palm Beach (18 games) and the Springfield Cardinals (113 games), hitting .231 with six home runs and 45 RBI in 131 games. He played for Springfield in 2010, hitting .243 with 13 home runs and 72 RBI in 132 games. He also stole 13 bases in 15 tries.

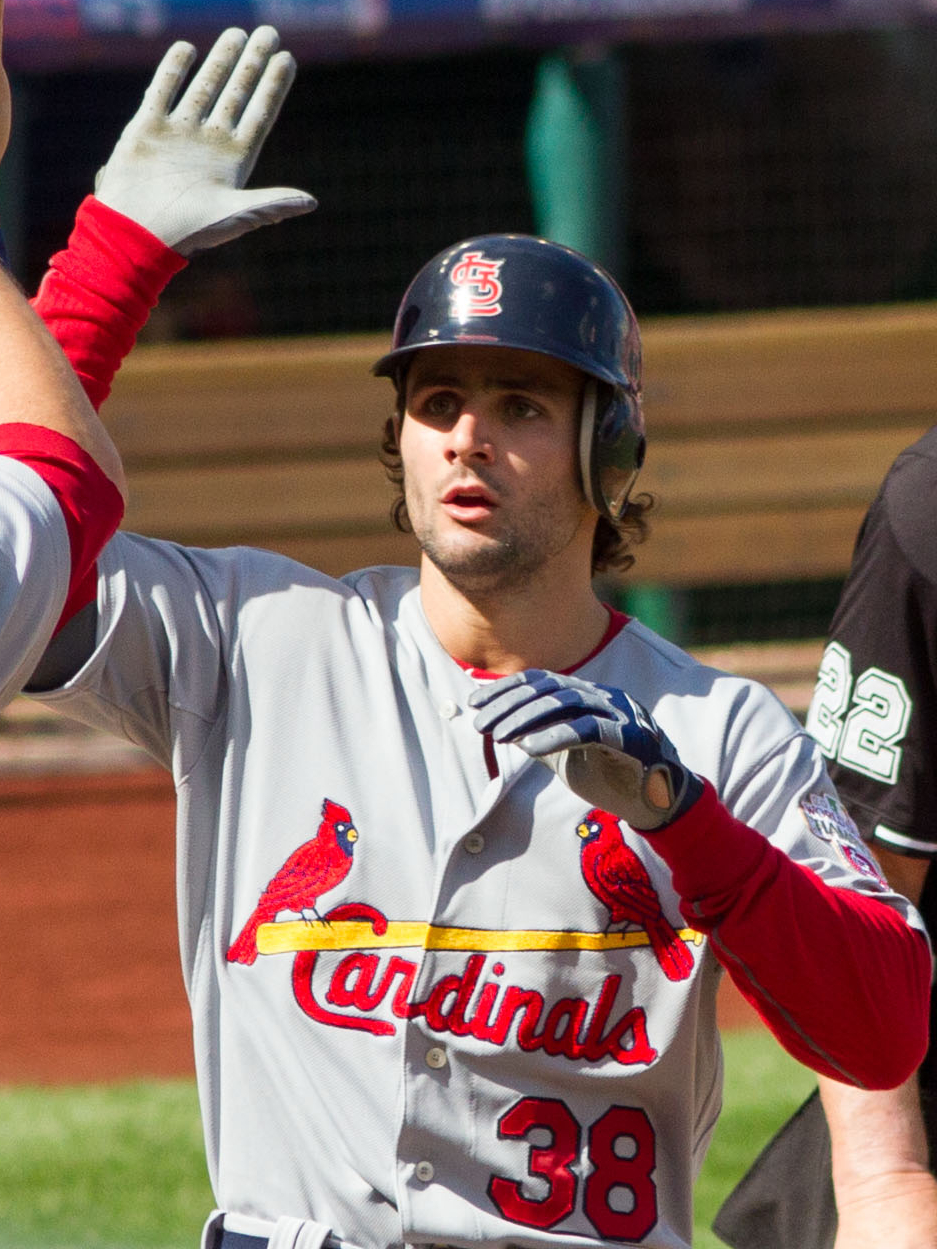
Kozma during the 2012 National League Division Series

On May 18, 2011, Kozma was called up from the AAA Memphis Redbirds, with whom he hit .214 in 112 games, to the major league club to replace injured middle infielder Nick Punto. He made his major league debut that night, and hit a double with an RBI in his first at-bat when pinch-hitting in the 5th inning at Busch Stadium. Kozma was part of the Cardinals' postseason roster when the team won the 2011 World Series over the Texas Rangers.

Kozma was optioned to Triple-A to begin the 2012 season. He was recalled to the Cardinals on August 31, 2012, when Rafael Furcal was placed on the disabled list. Kozma singled to give the Cardinals the deciding runs in the winner-take-all fifth game of the 2012 National League Division Series (NLDS) over the Washington Nationals. During the NLDS, he hit a home run—his first in an MLB postseason—and drove in five runners. Kozma batted .227 during the NLCS against the San Francisco Giants and added a stolen base. Despite leading 3–1 in the series, the Cardinals lost the Series in the last game.

Kozma became the Cardinals' primary shortstop in 2013 and finished with a .217 batting average, 20 doubles, a home run and three stolen bases in 143 games. They secured the best record in the National League, thus making the playoffs. He provided a key defensive play in the sixth inning of Game 3 of the NLCS against the Los Angeles Dodgers. Dodgers batter Juan Uribe hit a rapid ground ball in the hole, which Kozma backhanded and relayed to second baseman Matt Carpenter, tipping off an inning ending double play. The Cardinals won the game, 4–2.

The Cardinals won the NLCS to advance to the World Series. In Game 1 of the World Series against the Boston Red Sox, Kozma was involved in a controversial error/blown call that was overturned by the umpiring crew. He mishandled and dropped a ball tossed to him that would have commenced an inning-ending double play. Red Sox manager John Farrell leapt of the dugout, confronted umpire Dana DeMuth and requested that the umpire crew get together and make a group decision on the ruling. The umpires ultimately ruled that Kozma never had control of the ball, and the inning continued. Boston went on to score three runs that inning, and eventually went on to win the championship in six games.

The following off-season, the Cardinals signed longtime American League player Jhonny Peralta as a free agent to upgrade their offense at shortstop, thus supplanting Kozma from his short-lived status as the starter. The Cardinals signed Mark Ellis, another free agent, and kept rookie second baseman Kolten Wong on the MLB roster for much of the season. Those three moves relegated Kozma to spending most of 2014 playing for Memphis, where he hit .248 with eight home runs and 59 RBI. The Cardinals recalled him when MLB rosters expand in September, and in 14 games hit .304 with three doubles. The club won the NL Central division, assuring a playoff berth for the fourth time in his four seasons with the club. He was a last-minute addition to the postseason roster for the NLDS against the Dodgers.

The following spring training, Kozma resumed working out at all infield positions, and added time as a catcher. On June 25, 2015, against the Miami Marlins, he scored on a double from Kolten Wong. He had three hits and reached base in four plate appearances, snapping an 0–21 streak that dated back to May 19. Kozma totaled 99 at-bats for the season, batting .152 with a .236 on-base percentage and no extra base hits. The Cardinals removed him from the 40-man roster after the season and re-assigned him to Memphis. He opted to become a free agent.

=== New York Yankees ===
On December 4, 2015, the New York Yankees signed Kozma to a minor league contract. He spent the 2016 season with the Scranton/Wilkes-Barre RailRiders helping the team win the International League and Triple–A Championships. He signed a contract with the Yankees for the 2017 season. Due to an injury to Didi Gregorius, the Yankees added Kozma to their Opening Day roster. He was designated for assignment on April 28, to make room for Gregorius' return.

=== Texas Rangers ===
On April 30, 2017, the Texas Rangers claimed Kozma off of waivers. He played as a backup utility infielder. On July 20, he was designated for assignment.

=== Detroit Tigers ===
On January 9, 2018, the Detroit Tigers signed Kozma to a minor league contract with an invitation to spring training. He started the season with the Triple–A Toledo Mud Hens. On May 8, the Tigers purchased Kozma's minor league contract and added him to the major league roster. He hit a home run in his first at-bat for the Tigers the next day. He was designated for assignment on June 1. After clearing waivers, Kozma was sent outright to Toledo on June 5. On September 14, the Tigers again purchased Kozma's contract from Toledo to add infield depth. In 27 games, he hit .217 with one home run and eight RBI. On October 24, Kozma was removed from the 40-man roster and sent outright to Triple-A Toledo. He subsequently rejected the assignment and elected free agency the next day.

On November 9, 2018, Kozma re–signed with the Tigers organization on a minor league contract that included an invitation to spring training. He also played winter baseball with the Perth Heat of the Australian Baseball League for their 2018-19 season, crediting teammate Warwick Saupold for persuading him to join the Heat. Kozma played in 88 games for Toledo in 2019, slashing .263/.340/.414 with seven home runs and 51 RBI. He became a minor league free agent on November 4, 2019.

=== Atlanta Braves ===
On November 19, 2019, Kozma signed a minor league deal with the Atlanta Braves. On July 4, 2020, it was announced that Kozma had tested positive for COVID-19. Kozma did not play in a game in 2020 due to the cancellation of the minor league season because of the COVID-19 pandemic. He became a free agent on November 2.

=== Oakland Athletics ===
On November 18, 2020, Kozma signed a minor league contract with the Oakland Athletics organization. He played in 113 games for the Triple-A Las Vegas Aviators in 2021, slashing .245/.307/.337 with 4 home runs, 40 RBI, and six stolen bases.

On October 1, 2021, his contract was selected, and he appeared in three games for Oakland to end the year. On October 19, he was outrighted off the 40-man roster. Kozma got one hit in 11 at-bats in 2021. On October 19, Kozma elected free agency.

=== Kansas City Monarchs ===
On April 9, 2022, Kozma signed with the Kansas City Monarchs of the American Association. Kozma played in 84 games for Kansas City, batting .291/.344/.385 with 2 home runs and 53 RBI. He was released on October 31.

Kozma played with the Perth Heat of the Australian Baseball League for the 2022–23 season finishing the season 2nd in the South West Division.

=== Kane County Cougars ===
On March 2, 2023, Kozma signed with the Kane County Cougars of the American Association of Professional Baseball. In 62 games for Kane County, he batted .201/.296/.242 with no home runs and 15 RBI. On August 8, Kozma was released by the Cougars. However, on August 20, Kozma re–signed with the team. He was released again on August 23.
