= Daniel Descalso =

American baseball player and coach (born 1986)

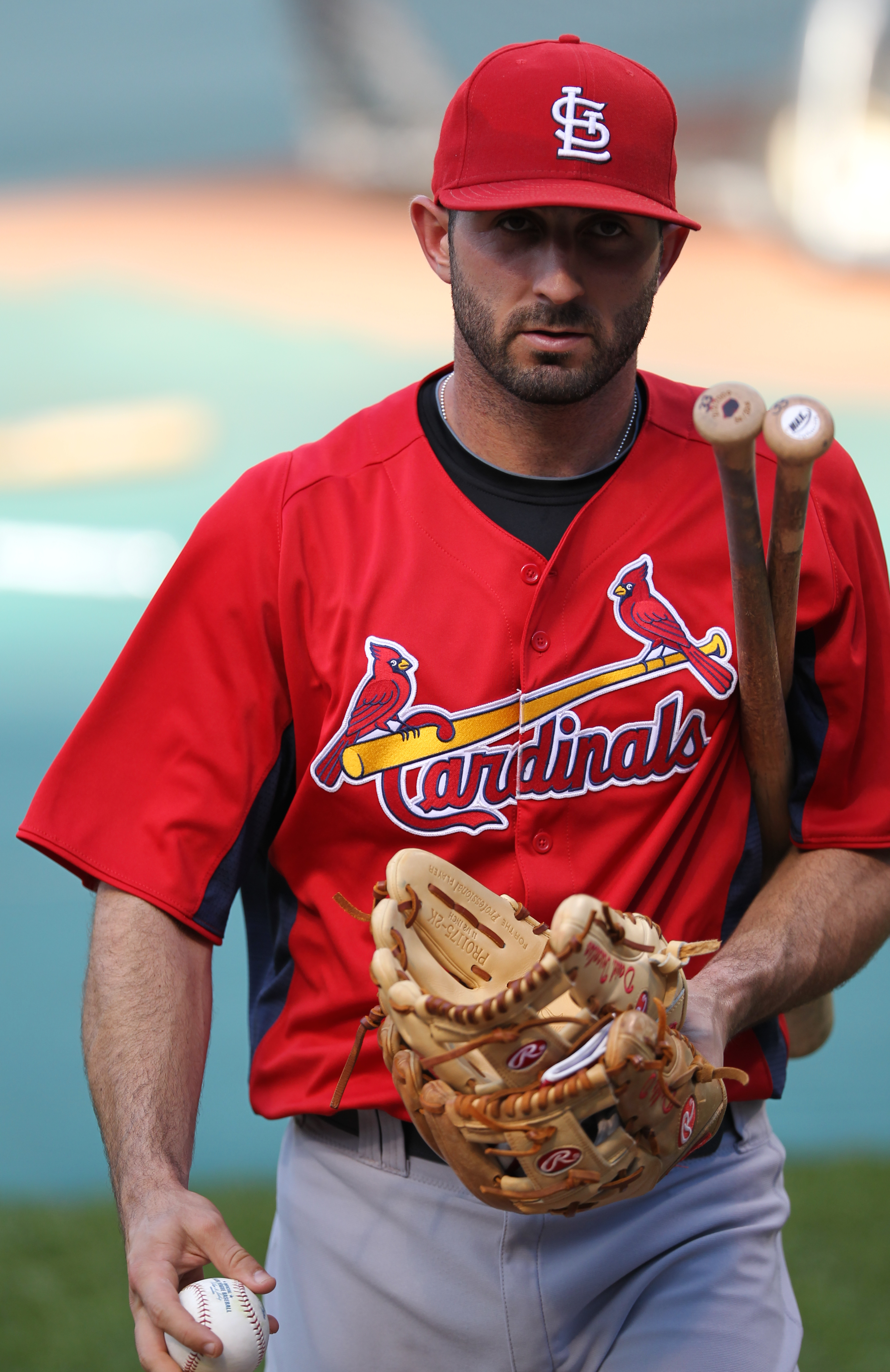
- Descalso with the Cardinals in 2011

St. Louis Cardinals – No. 34
- Infielder / Coach
- Born: October 19, 1986 (age 39); Redwood City, California, U.S.
- Batted: Left Threw: Right

MLB debut
- September 18, 2010, for the St. Louis Cardinals

Last MLB appearance
- September 29, 2019, for the Chicago Cubs

MLB statistics
- Batting average: .235
- Home runs: 48
- Runs batted in: 294
- Stats at Baseball Reference

Teams
- As player: St. Louis Cardinals (2010–2014); Colorado Rockies (2015–2016); Arizona Diamondbacks (2017–2018); Chicago Cubs (2019); As coach: St. Louis Cardinals (2024–present)

Career highlights and awards
- World Series champion (2011)
Medals
Men's baseball
Representing United States
Baseball World Cup
| Gold medal – first place | 2009 Nettuno | Team |

Daniel William Descalso (born October 19, 1986) is an American professional baseball coach and former infielder who is the bench coach for the St. Louis Cardinals of Major League Baseball (MLB). He played in MLB for the St. Louis Cardinals, Colorado Rockies, Arizona Diamondbacks, and Chicago Cubs from 2010 to 2019. In addition to being recognized for clutch hitting over the course of his career via statistical analysis after he retired, he also at one time was considered "the most perfect pitcher in the history of baseball" after having retired his first nine MLB batters faced as a pitcher without allowing a baserunner, spread over his first four pitching appearances of his MLB career.

== Early life ==
Descalso was born in Redwood City, California, on October 19, 1986, to Marylou and George Descalso. He is the oldest of six children. He played baseball in San Carlos Little League and went to Saint Francis High School in Mountain View, California. He pitched as the team's number 1 starter for three straight seasons, and played 2nd base. He made the All-Central Coast Section squads twice, including first team as a senior, second team as a junior. He made the West Catholic Athletic League first teams in each of last two seasons, including WCAL MVP distinction in 2004. He also played football, winning first-team All-WCAL, second-team All-CCS and honorable mention All-Metro as a senior. He scored three touchdowns against their crosstown rivals during 2003 Homecoming game. He graduated in 2004.

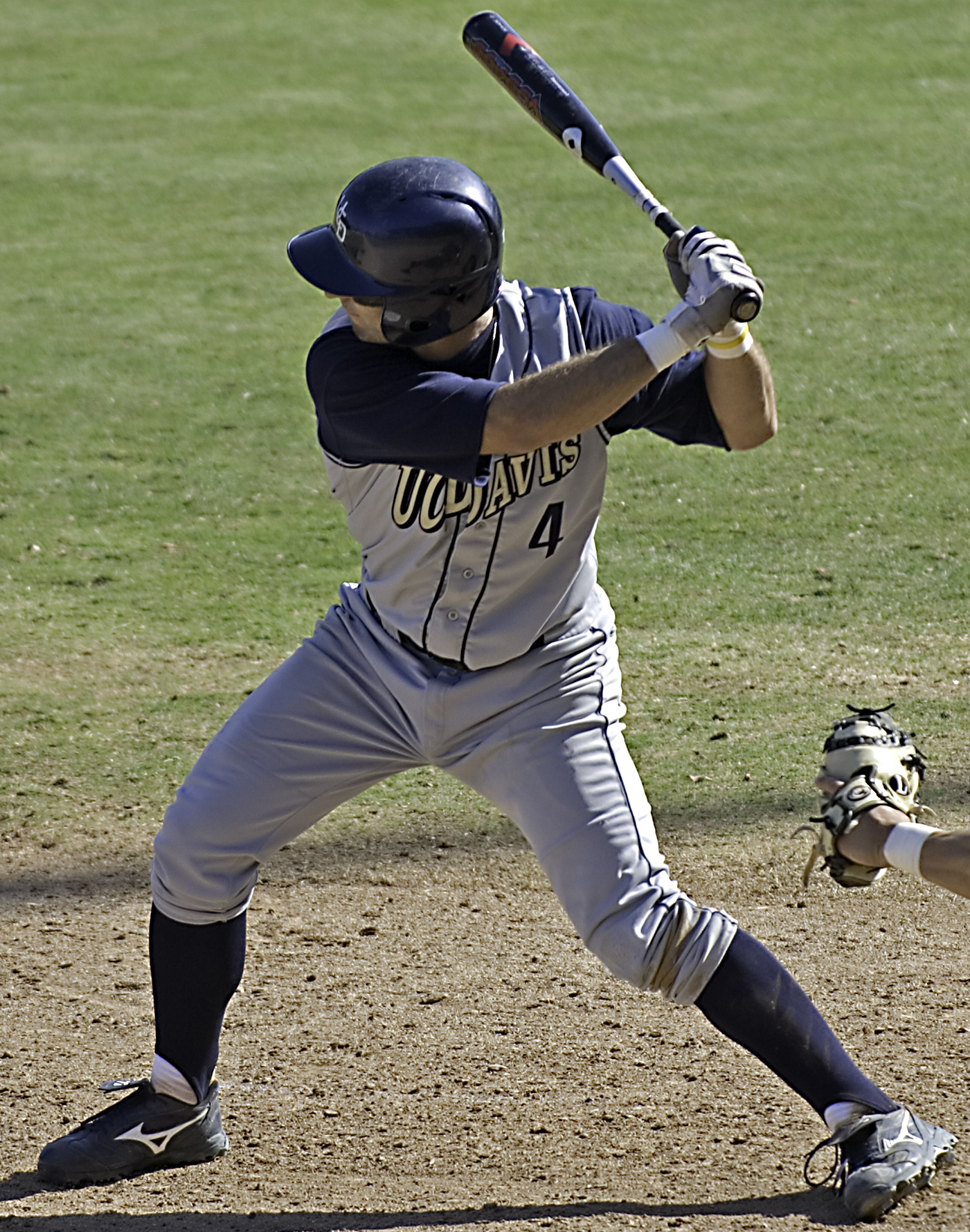
Descalso with the UC Davis Aggies in 2007

Descalso went on to UC Davis, where he played third base and majored in economics. In 2006, he played summer league baseball for the Wisconsin Woodchucks of the Northwoods League. In 2007, Descalso was named to the NCAA All-Independent First Team. He put up some of the best stats ever at UC Davis, with a .397 lifetime batting average and 92 career hits. His 22 doubles rank second all-time in school history. Following his junior year, he was selected by the St. Louis Cardinals in the 3rd round (112th overall) of the 2007 amateur entry draft. He was selected in the highest draft position ever for an Aggie player.

He is 5 ft 10 in (1.78 m) and 190 pounds.

== Professional career ==
=== St. Louis Cardinals ===
==== 2007 and 2008 seasons ====
Following the draft, Descalso began his professional career with the Batavia Muckdogs, the Short-Season A affiliate of the Cardinals in the New York–Penn League. He played 69 games for the Muckdogs in 2007, splitting time between third base and second base.

In 2008, Descalso began with the Palm Beach Cardinals, the High-A affiliate of the Cardinals in the Florida State League. He played 115 games in Jupiter, where he batted .243 and played shortstop, 2nd base, and 3rd base. In August 2008, he was advanced to the Springfield Cardinals, the Double-A affiliate in Missouri. He played in just nine games, but hit .351.

==== 2009 season ====
In 2009 with Springfield, Descalso had eight home runs and 51 runs batted in with 288 at-bats over 73 games, all at second base. His line was an impressive .323/.396/.531. At the end of the 2009 season, he was named to the Double-A Texas League post-season all star team. However, he did not play in that game, instead was promoted to Triple-A Memphis in early July when Jarrett Hoffpauir was recalled by the Cardinals. After the call up, Descalso played most games at 2nd base, with 9 at 1st base.

Descalso was also named the 2009 Springfield Cardinals Player of the Year. He missed final two weeks of 2009 season to play for the gold medal winning team USA in the 2009 Baseball World Cup in Italy.

==== 2010 season ====
The Cardinals invited Descalso to the 2010 spring camp, where he batted .500 with nine runs batted in during 14 games. Through the first two months of the 2010 AAA season, he exclusively played second base.

On September 18, Descalso's contract was purchased by the Cardinals and he was promoted to the major leagues. He officially made his major league debut on September 18, 2010, at home against the San Diego Padres when he was announced as a pinch hitter (although he did not bat and was replaced by right-handed batter Nick Stavinoha). His first game as a starter was on September 22, 2010, against the Pirates at their park, where he garnered his first hit and first RBI with a two-run double. He started at third base, rather than his usual second base position. Nonetheless, his first MLB career fielding attempt was the front end of a 5-4–3 double play (Descalso–Schumaker–Pujols). He finished the year solidly, and remained on the 40-man roster.

==== 2011 season ====
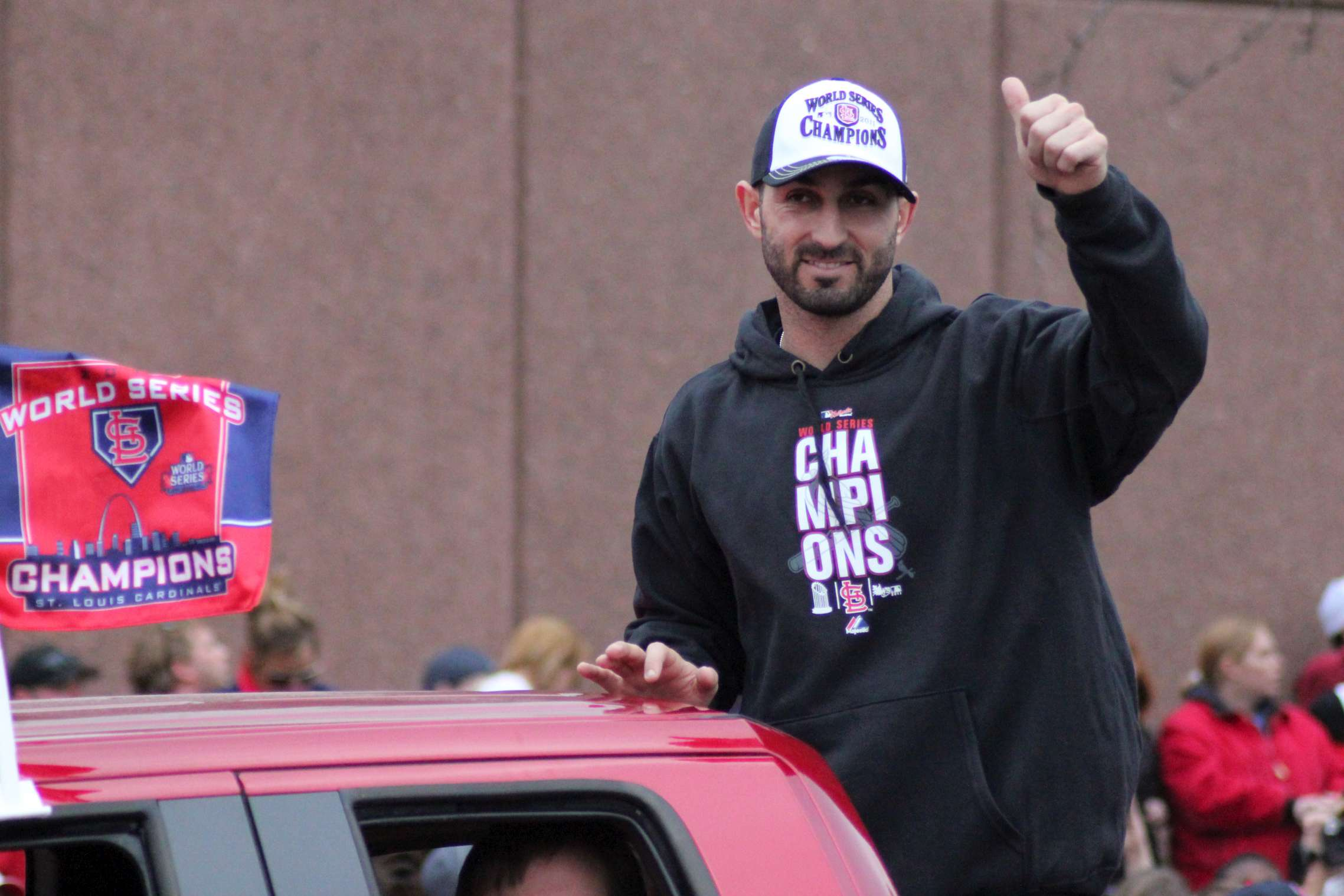
Descalso during the 2011 World Series parade

Because of his late-season performance, Descalso started the 2011 spring training with a legitimate chance to make the Cardinals. However, the Cards had a number of capable infielders fighting for roster spots, including David Freese, Tyler Greene, Double-A prospect Matt Carpenter, and off-season acquisitions Ryan Theriot and Nick Punto. The difficulties were in determining a position and securing a spot. An injury to Punto and questions about Freese's durability left the Cards desperate for an extra utility infielder rather than an outfielder. Ultimately, Descalso secured a roster spot out of training camp.

Descalso hit his first major league home run on May 3 in St. Louis in the seventh inning. The three-run blast was a game winner that vaulted the Cardinals to a come-from-behind 7–5 win against the Florida Marlins. In a July 7 game against the Cincinnati Reds, he stroked four hits with two RBI.

Following the 2011 season, Descalso was a finalist for the Rawlings Gold Glove Award at third base for the National League, although the honor was awarded to Plácido Polanco of the Philadelphia Phillies.

==== 2012–2014 ====
After playing regularly at second base during the 2012 season, Descalso played an integral role in the postseason. In Game 5 of the 2012 National League Division Series, where the Cardinals came back from a 6-run deficit to defeat the Washington Nationals 9–7, Descalso homered, doubled, and then hit a two-run single to tie the game.

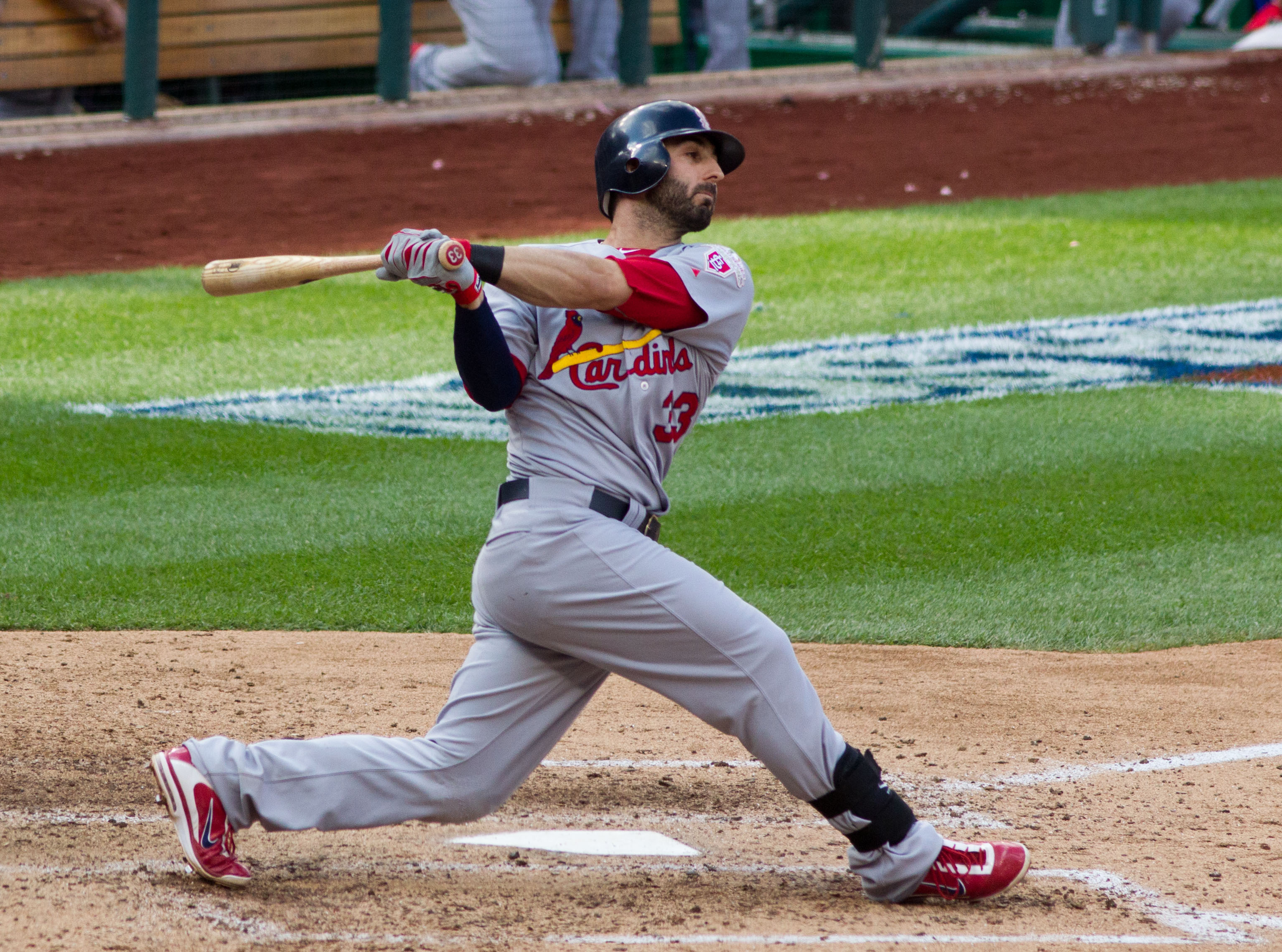
Descalso in 2012

On May 21, 2013, Decalso hit his first career grand slam and tallied a career-high five runs batted in as the Cardinals beat the San Diego Padres 10–2 at Petco Park. Prior to the game, Descalso was batting just .197 with one home run. For his 2013 season statistics, Descalso batted .238 with five home runs and 42 runs batted in. He continued his versatility in the infield by making starts at second base, third base, and shortstop.

Descalso filed for a $1.65 million contract request following the season. The Cardinals and Descalso avoided arbitration and agreed to a one-year, $1.29 million contract on January 30, 2014. Descalso made his major league pitching debut against the Chicago Cubs in the top of the ninth inning with two outs on May 12, 2014. He threw two pitches, recording one out and allowing no hits. With a chance for increased playing time during interleague play against the Baltimore Orioles, he collected five hits in 10 at bats over an August 8–10 series.

In three consecutive days and four consecutive games, August 30 through September 1, 2014, Descalso became the first player in Cardinals history to start a game at each of the four infield positions.

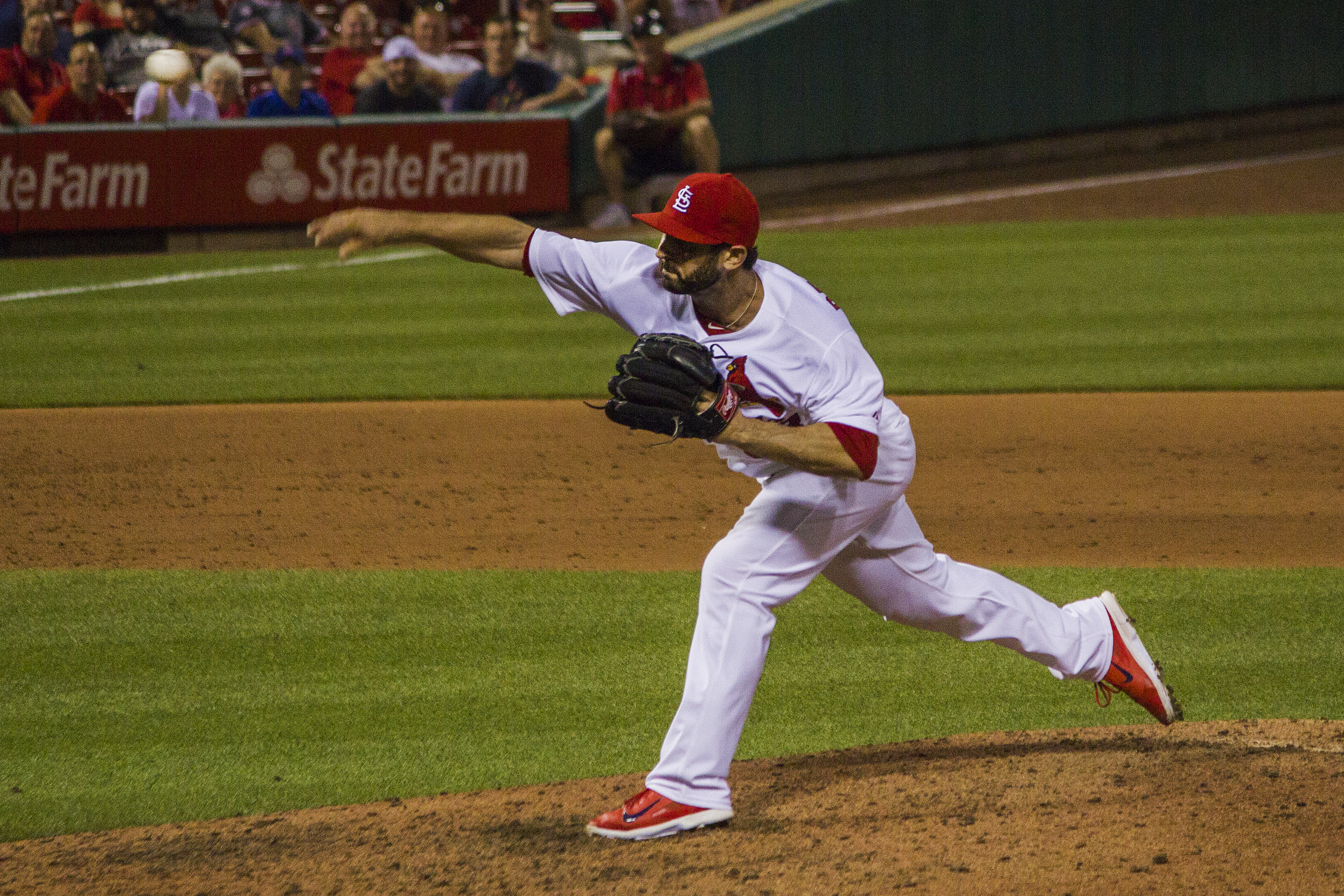
Descalso pitching for the Cardinals in 2014

=== Colorado Rockies ===
Descalso signed a two-year deal with the Colorado Rockies on December 16, 2014. The deal totaled $3.6 million with the opportunity for another $1 million in performance bonuses. Descalso appeared in 101 games in 2015, hitting a career worst .205 with five home runs and 22 runs batted in. Descalso began the 2016 season on the disabled list with a broken hand suffered in spring training. In 2016, Descalso appeared in 99 games, bouncing back offensively by hitting .264 with a career-high eight home runs and 38 RBI. Descalso served as a veteran presence on the Rockies, while also filling an important utility role, receiving time at six different positions over the course of his two seasons at Colorado.

=== Arizona Diamondbacks ===
On February 7, 2017, Descalso signed a one-year, $1.5 million deal with the Arizona Diamondbacks with an option for 2018, and entered a heated competition for a bench spot on Opening Day. On April 30, 2017, Descalso hit a two-run home run for his first walk off against the Colorado Rockies. Descalso ended the season with a slash line of .233/.332/.395 while setting career highs with ten home runs and 51 runs batted in.

The Diamondbacks picked up Descalso's option and he returned to the team in 2018. On May 4, 2018, Descalso pitched the top of the ninth inning after the pitcher was removed with one out. On seven pitches (six for strikes) Descalso retired the last two Astros hitters. Significantly, based on both the May 4, 2018 his three prior MLB pitching appearances, Descalso "the most perfect pitcher in the history of baseball" according to sportswriter Daniel R. Epstein by retiring nine batters without allowing a baserunner.

=== Chicago Cubs ===
On December 18, 2018, Descalso signed a two-year contract worth $5 million with the Chicago Cubs. The Cubs have a $3.5 million option in 2021 with a $1 million buyout. After 25 games into the 2019 season, Descalso was a solid second base presence and often was the lead-off batter in games. He had 19 hits in 71 at-bats with 10 base on balls, 10 runs batted in and a batting average of .268. It did not continue past the first 25 games though. He cooled off and finished the year with a .173 average and did not start in a game after June 30. Descalso was shut down to begin the 2020 season with a left ankle sprain and ended up missing the entire season due to the injury.

=== Minnesota Twins ===
On May 13, 2021, Descalso signed a minor league contract with the Minnesota Twins organization and was assigned to the Triple-A St. Paul Saints. On June 22, Descalso opted out of his minor league contract with Minnesota and became a free agent. In 24 games with the Saints, Descalso limped to an .093/.244/.200 batting line with 2 home runs and 4 RBI.

== Post-playing career ==
On February 16, 2023, Descalso joined the Arizona Diamondbacks as a baseball operations assistant. Later that year on November 20, 2023, the Cardinals hired Descalso as their bench coach for the 2024 season. It is a role Descalso currently still holds with the teams as of the end of the 2026 regular season.

=== Recognition as a Historical Clutch MLB Hitter ===
After Desescalso's career had concluded, he then gained recognition as an all-time historically clutch hitter based on a "clutch" statiscial metric developed and implemented by the sports company Fangraphs. As independently reported on July 24, 2020, at that time Descalco ranked as the second most clutch player in MLB history.

== Personal life ==
Descalso is married to Julia, with whom he has two sons and a daughter. In December 2021, a baseball fan and memorabilia collector named John Silva realized a baseball of unknown origin in his collection was the ball from Descalso's very first major league hit and he returned the ball to Descalso.
