= 2012 Washington Nationals season =

2012 Washington Nationals
- National League East champions
- League: National League
- Division: East
- Ballpark: Nationals Park
- City: Washington, D.C.
- Record: 98–64 (.605)
- Divisional place: 1st
- Owners: Lerner Enterprises
- General managers: Mike Rizzo
- Managers: Davey Johnson
- Television: MASN; WDCW (CW 50) (Bob Carpenter, FP Santangelo)
- Radio: WJFK 106.7 FM (Charlie Slowes, Dave Jageler)

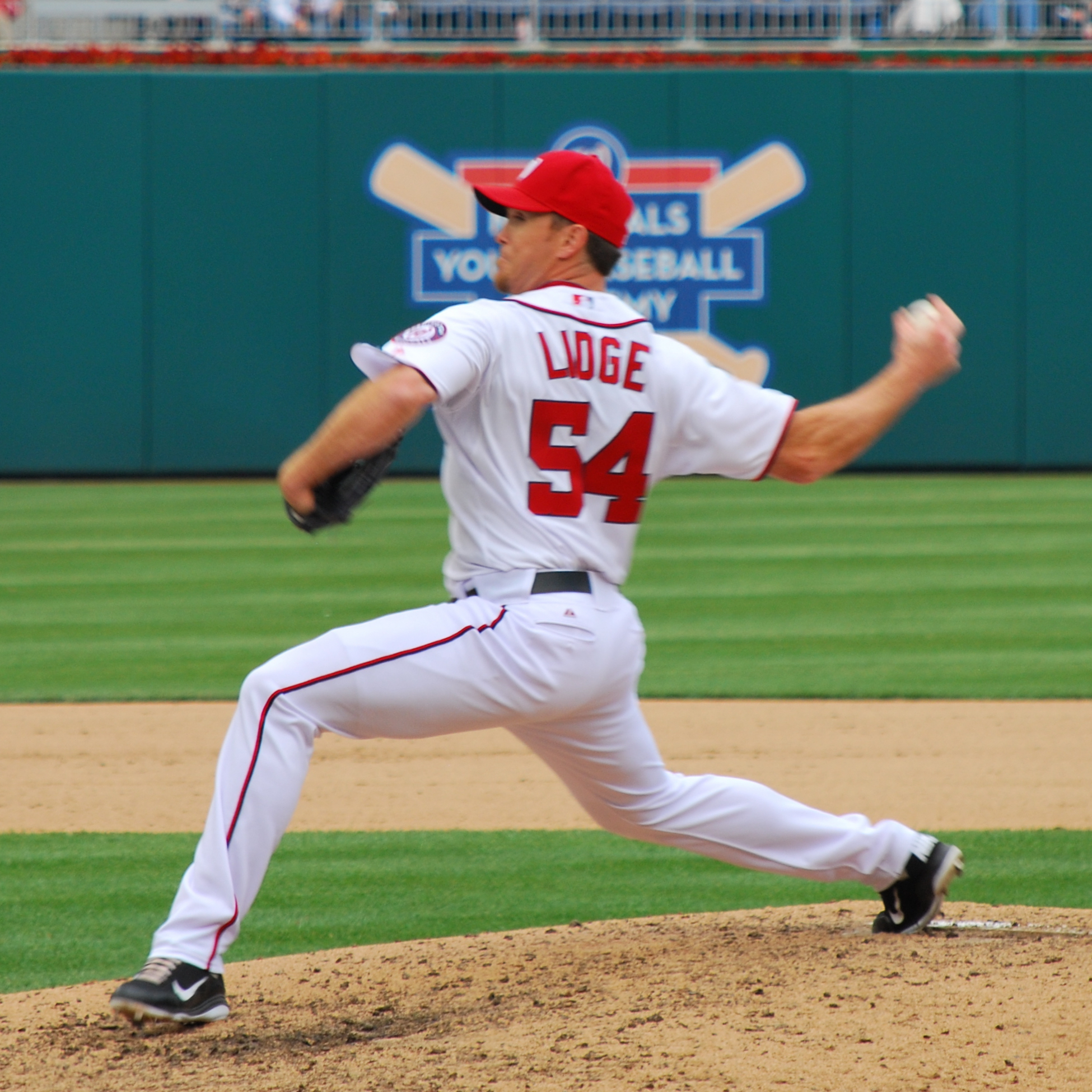

The Washington Nationals' 2012 season was the eighth season for the baseball franchise of Major League Baseball in the District of Columbia, the fifth season at Nationals Park, and the 44th since the original team was started in Montreal, Quebec. After finishing the previous season in third place with an 80–81 record, out of last place in the National League East for the second time since moving to Washington, the Nationals made several moves to pursue playoff contention in 2012 and beyond. Despite being plagued with injuries, the Nationals had an impressive start to the season, never dropping below the .500 mark and consistently holding first or second place in their division. On September 3, the Nationals won their 82nd game of the season, making this season their first winning season since moving to Washington, D.C., in 2005 and the first for the franchise since 2003. On September 20, the Nationals beat the Los Angeles Dodgers to clinch the franchise's first postseason berth since 1981, as well as their first in a non-strike shortened season, and the first for a Washington-based team since the Washington Senators won the American League pennant in 1933. On October 1, the Nationals clinched the National League East title. On October 3, they went on to clinch the best record in Major League Baseball at 98–64. They played the St. Louis Cardinals in the NLDS, which they lost three games to two.

== Offseason ==
=== Departures ===
On October 30, 2011, following the World Series, the Nationals granted Todd Coffey, Alex Cora, Jonny Gomes, Liván Hernández, Laynce Nix, and Iván Rodríguez free agency. On November 2, they also granted Luis Atilano, J.D. Martin, Shairon Martis, Garrett Mock, Óliver Pérez, Miguel Perez, Michael Aubrey, Matt Antonelli, Gregor Blanco, Buck Coats, and Jeff Frazier free agency. On November 3, Brian Bixler was selected off waivers by the Houston Astros, and on December 8, Erik Komatsu was selected by the St. Louis Cardinals in the Rule 5 draft (he was returned, via the Minnesota Twins, on May 29). On December 9, the Nationals traded Collin Balester to the Detroit Tigers for Ryan Perry. On December 12, Doug Slaten was granted free agency.

Additionally, on October 31, the Nationals moved interim bench coach Pat Corrales back into a position in player development for the team. Corrales had assumed that role in June after the resignations of manager Jim Riggleman and interim manager John McLaren — McLaren had held the bench coach position under Riggleman.

On December 23, the Nationals traded Brad Peacock and Tommy Milone, along with minor-league prospects Derek Norris and A. J. Cole, to the Oakland Athletics for left-handed starting pitcher Gio González and Oakland minor-league prospect Robert Gilliam.

On February 19, 2012, Mike Cameron (signed on December 19) retired after seventeen years in the major leagues, with one All-Star appearance and three Gold Glove awards.

On March 30, the Nationals granted Andrés Blanco (signed on December 16) free agency, and on April 2, the Nationals granted Chad Durbin (signed on February 1) free agency.

=== Arrivals ===
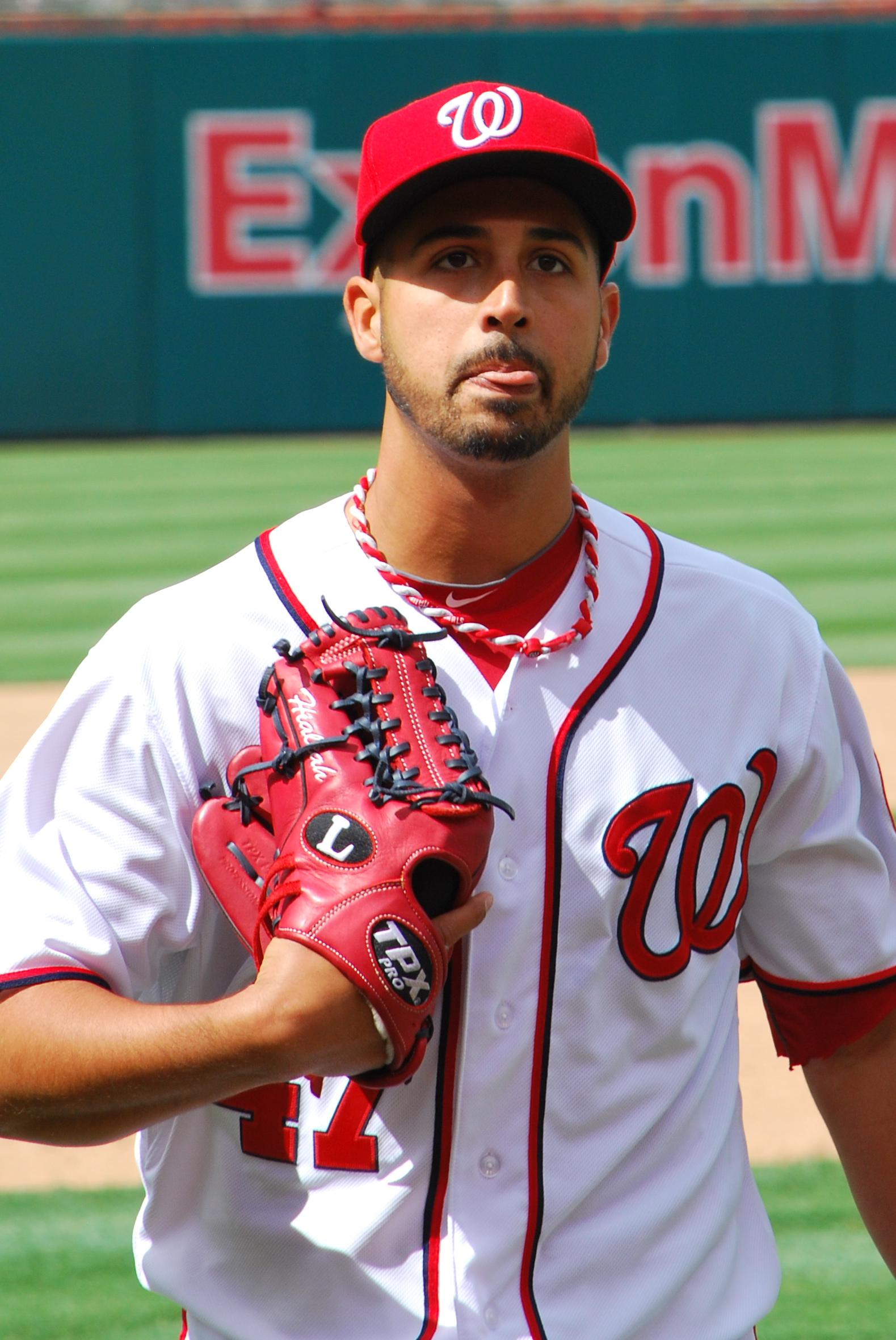
Gio González

On December 5, 2011, the Nationals signed Brett Carroll as a free agent. On December 11, they signed Jason Michaels; they released him on March 29, 2012 and re-signed him to a new contract on April 2. On December 14 they signed Jarrett Hoffpauir and Waldis Joaquin, on December 15 they signed Jeff Fulchino, on December 20 they signed Xavier Paul and Chad Tracy, and on December 22 they signed Mark DeRosa.

On December 16 they signed Andrés Blanco, who they later released on March 30. On December 19, they signed Mike Cameron, who retired on February 19. On February 1, they signed Chad Durbin, who they later released on April 2.

On December 23, the Nationals traded Brad Peacock and Tommy Milone, along with minor-league prospects Derek Norris and A. J. Cole, to the Oakland Athletics for left-handed starting pitcher Gio González and Oakland minor-league prospect Robert Gilliam.

On January 4, 2012, the Nationals signed Dan Cortes, on January 26 they signed Brad Lidge, on February 2 they signed Edwin Jackson, on February 3 they signed Mitch Atkins, on February 6 they signed Mark Teahen, on February 28 they signed Mike Schultz, on March 18 they signed Xavier Nady, and on March 29 they signed Zach Duke.

== Spring training ==
The Nationals held their 2012 spring training in Viera, Florida, with home games played at Space Coast Stadium.

== Regular season ==
On April 3, 2012, the Nationals placed Drew Storen and Michael Morse on the disabled list to start the season, and John Lannan was optioned to Triple-A Syracuse. The Nationals also started a "Take Back Our Park" campaign vs. Philadelphia so Nationals fans in Maryland, Virginia, and Washington, D.C. could receive tickets for the series on May 4–6 in an advanced pre-sale. On April 28, 2012, top prospect Bryce Harper made his Major League debut vs. Los Angeles in Los Angeles, finishing with a double and a go-ahead sacrifice fly. The Nationals, however, would lose the game on a Matt Kemp walk-off home run in the bottom of the 10th inning.

At the All-Star break, which began on July 9, 2012, the Nationals were in first place in the NL East with a 49–34 record, four games ahead of the second-place Atlanta Braves.

On July 30, 2012, despite having an off day, the Nationals obtained the best record in baseball due to a loss by the Cincinnati Reds. This was the first time that a Washington baseball team held sole position of first place in MLB since 1933.

On September 20, 2012, the Nats clinched their first Playoff berth since moving to Washington, with a 4–1 win over the L.A. Dodgers.

On October 1, 2012, the Nats clinched the NL East when the Braves lost 2–1 to the Pirates.

The Nats finished the season on October 3, 2012, defeating the Phillies 5–1. They finished with a 98–64 record, the best record in Major League baseball that year. The Nationals played 20 extra inning games during the season, the most of any MLB team in 2012.

=== All-Star Game ===
Nationals starting pitchers Stephen Strasburg and Gio González, and shortstop Ian Desmond, were chosen to represent the Nationals in the 2012 All-Star Game. Desmond decided not to participate in order to rest a sore oblique muscle; Michael Bourn of the Atlanta Braves was chosen to go in his place. Giancarlo Stanton of the Miami Marlins declined to participate because of a serious knee injury which required surgery, so the Nationals' Bryce Harper was chosen to play in his place. This made the 19-year-old Harper the youngest position player and the third youngest player to be named an All-Star.

The Nationals therefore had four All-Stars, the most since they moved to Washington, D.C.

The game was played on Tuesday, July 10, in Kansas City, and the National League won, 8–0. Gonzalez and Strasburg each pitched one scoreless inning; Gonzalez struck out one batter, and Strasburg allowed a hit and a walk. Harper entered the game in the fifth inning as a pinch hitter and played the remainder of the game in left field; at the plate, he went 0–1 with a walk.

=== Season standings ===
NL East
Team	W	L	Pct.	GB	Home	Road
Washington Nationals	98	64	.605	—	50‍–‍31	48‍–‍33
Atlanta Braves	94	68	.580	4	48‍–‍33	46‍–‍35
Philadelphia Phillies	81	81	.500	17	40‍–‍41	41‍–‍40
New York Mets	74	88	.457	24	36‍–‍45	38‍–‍43
Miami Marlins	69	93	.426	29	38‍–‍43	31‍–‍50

Division leaders
Team	W	L	Pct.
Washington Nationals	98	64	.605
Cincinnati Reds	97	65	.599
San Francisco Giants	94	68	.580

Wild Card teams (Top 2 teams qualify for postseason)
Team	W	L	Pct.	GB
Atlanta Braves	94	68	.580	+6
St. Louis Cardinals	88	74	.543	—
Los Angeles Dodgers	86	76	.531	2
Milwaukee Brewers	83	79	.512	5
Philadelphia Phillies	81	81	.500	7
Arizona Diamondbacks	81	81	.500	7
Pittsburgh Pirates	79	83	.488	9
San Diego Padres	76	86	.469	12
New York Mets	74	88	.457	14
Miami Marlins	69	93	.426	19
Colorado Rockies	64	98	.395	24
Chicago Cubs	61	101	.377	27
Houston Astros	55	107	.340	33

=== Record vs. opponents ===
2012 National League record Source: MLB Standings Grid – 2012
Team	AZ	ATL	CHC	CIN	COL	MIA	HOU	LAD	MIL	NYM	PHI	PIT	SD	SF	STL	WSH	AL
Arizona	–	2–5	5–4	2–5	9–7	5–3	6–0	12–6	3–3	3–4	2–4	3–4	7–11	9–9	1–5	2–4	9–6
Atlanta	5–2	–	3–4	1–5	6–1	14–4	4–2	3–3	3–3	12–6	12–6	3–4	4–3	3–4	5–1	8–10	8–10
Chicago	4–5	4–3	–	4–12	2–4	8–5	2–4	2–4	4–13	4–2	2–4	8–8	3–3	1–6	7–10	1–6	5–10
Cincinnati	5–2	5–1	12–4	–	5–1	10–5	2–4	3–3	9–6	6–2	3–4	11–7	6–2	4–3	6–7	2–5	7–8
Colorado	7–9	1–6	4–2	1–5	–	5–2	5–2	8–10	5–1	5–2	2–7	2–4	8–10	4–14	2–5	4–3	2–13
Houston	0–6	2–4	5–8	5–10	2–5	–	2–4	2–4	8–9	4–2	3–3	5–12	3–5	1–8	4–11	1–7	6–9
Los Angeles	6–12	3–3	4–2	4–2	10–8	4–2	–	4–2	1–6	4–3	5–2	6–1	11–7	8–10	6–5	4–2	6–9
Miami	3–5	4–14	4–2	3–3	4–3	–	4–2	2–4	4–4	4–12	8–10	1–4	5–1	5–2	2–5	9–9	5–13
Milwaukee	3–3	3–3	13–4	6–9	1–5	9–8	6–1	4–4	–	3–2	2–5	11–4	3–4	2–4	6–9	3–5	6–9
New York	4–3	6–12	2–4	2–6	2–5	2–4	3–4	12–4	2–3	–	10–8	5–2	4–3	4–4	4–3	4–14	8–7
Philadelphia	4–2	6–12	4–2	4–3	7–2	10–8	3–3	2–5	5–2	8–10	–	3–4	4–3	2–4	5–2	9–9	5–10
Pittsburgh	4–3	2–3	8–8	7–11	4–2	4–1	12–5	1–6	4–11	2–5	4–3	–	1–5	3–3	8–7	3–2	10–8
San Diego	11–7	3–4	3–3	2–6	10–8	5–3	7–11	1–5	4–3	3–4	3–4	5–1	–	6–12	3–3	2–3	8–7
San Francisco	9–9	4–3	6–1	3–4	14–4	2–5	8–1	10–8	4–2	4–4	4–2	3–3	12–6	–	3–3	1–5	7–8
St. Louis	5–1	1–5	10–7	7–6	5–2	11–4	5–6	5–2	9–6	3–4	3–4	7–8	3–3	3–3	–	3–4	8–7
Washington	4–2	10–8	6–1	5–2	3–4	7–1	2–4	9–9	5–3	14–4	9–9	2–3	3–2	5–1	4–3	–	10–8

=== Opening Day lineup ===
Opening Day Starters
Name	Position
Ian Desmond	Shortstop
Danny Espinosa	Second baseman
Ryan Zimmerman	Third baseman
Adam LaRoche	First baseman
Jayson Werth	Right fielder
Mark DeRosa	Left fielder
Roger Bernadina	Center fielder
Wilson Ramos	Catcher
Stephen Strasburg	Starting pitcher

=== Roster ===
2012 Washington Nationals
**Roster**
**Pitchers**: 17 Sean Burnett; 36 Tyler Clippard; 48 Ross Detwiler; 30 Zach Duke; 56 Christian Garcia; 47 Gio González; 51 Michael Gonzalez; 32 Tom Gorzelanny; 33 Edwin Jackson; 31 John Lannan; 54 Brad Lidge; 52 Ryan Mattheus; 45 Ryan Perry; 63 Henry Rodríguez; 35 Craig Stammen; 22 Drew Storen; 37 Stephen Strasburg; 40 Chien-Ming Wang; 27 Jordan Zimmermann	**Catchers**: 26 Jesús Flores; 41 Sandy León; 49 Carlos Maldonado; 3 Wilson Ramos; 23 Jhonatan Solano; 24 Kurt Suzuki; **Infielders**: 7 Mark DeRosa; 20 Ian Desmond; 8 Danny Espinosa; 6 César Izturis; 25 Adam LaRoche; 1 Steve Lombardozzi Jr.; 38 Michael Morse; 18 Chad Tracy; 11 Ryan Zimmerman	**Outfielders**: 24 Rick Ankiel; 2 Roger Bernadina; 10 Corey Brown; 15 Brett Carroll; 34 Bryce Harper; 57 Tyler Moore; 21 Xavier Nady; 55 Eury Pérez; 28 Jayson Werth	**Manager**: 5 Davey Johnson; **Coaches**: 4 Rick Eckstein (hitting); 44 Trent Jewett (first base); 53 Randy Knorr (bench); 9 Jim Lett (bullpen); 43 Steve McCatty (pitching); 16 Bo Porter (third base)

=== Attendance ===
The Nationals drew 2,370,794 fans at Nationals Park during the regular season in 2012. It was the first time since 2006 that they had drawn more than 2,000,000 fans, and only the 2,731,993 they drew in their first season in Washington in 2005 exceeded it. It placed them ninth in attendance for the season among the 16 National League teams, also their best showing since 2005. Their highest attendance at a home game was on May 19, when they drew 42,331 for a game against the Baltimore Orioles, while their lowest was 14,520 for a game against the Houston Astros on April 18. Their average home attendance was 30,010 per game, second-highest since their arrival in Washington and the first time they had averaged over 30,000 a game since their first season in Washington in 2005.

=== Game log ===
Legend
	Nationals win
	Nationals loss
	Postponement
**Bold**	Nationals team member

2012 game log
April (14–8)

#	Date	Opponent	Score	Win	Loss	Save	Attendance	Record
1	April 5	@ Cubs	2–1	**Clippard** (1–0)	Mármol (0–1)	**Lidge** (1)	41,176	1–0
2	April 7	@ Cubs	7–4	**Mattheus** (1–0)	Wood (0–1)	**Rodríguez** (1)	40,102	2–0
3	April 8	@ Cubs	3–4	Samardzija (1–0)	**Zimmermann** (0–1)	Mármol (1)	31,973	2–1
4	April 9	@ Mets	3–4	Rauch (1–0)	**Rodríguez** (0–1)		23,970	2–2
5	April 10	@ Mets	6–2	**Detwiler** (1–0)	Gee (0–1)		26,927	3–2
6	April 11	@ Mets	4–0	**Strasburg** (1–0)	Santana (0–1)		34,614	4–2
7	April 12	Reds	3–2 (10)	**Stammen** (1–0)	Simón (0–1)		40,907	5–2
8	April 13	Reds	2–1 (13)	**Stammen** (2–0)	Marshall (0–1)		26,959	6–2
9	April 14	Reds	4–1	**Jackson** (1–0)	Bailey (0–2)		35,489	7–2
10	April 15	Reds	5–8 (11)	Arredondo (1–0)	**Clippard** (1–1)	Marshall (1)	25,679	7–3
11	April 16	Astros	6–3	**Strasburg** (2–0)	Weiland (0–2)	**Rodríguez** (2)	16,245	8–3
12	April 17	Astros	1–0	**Gonzalez** (1–0)	W. Rodríguez (0-2)	**Lidge** (2)	17,889	9-3
13	April 18	Astros	3–2	**Mattheus** (2–0)	F. Rodriguez (0–2)	**Rodríguez** (3)	14,520	10-3
14	April 19	Astros	4–11	Norris (1–0)	**Jackson** (1–1)		18,045	10–4
15	April 20	Marlins	2–0	**Detwiler** (2–0)	Zambrano (0–1)	**Rodríguez** (4)	24,640	11–4
16	April 21	Marlins	3–2 (10)	**Gorzelanny** (1–0)	Mujica (0–1)		26,745	12–4
-	April 22	Marlins	Game Postponed (rain) Rescheduled for August 3 as part of a doubleheader					
17	April 24	@ Padres	3–1	**Gonzalez** (2–0)	Richard (1–2)	**Rodríguez** (5)	16,599	13–4
18	April 25	@ Padres	7–2	**Zimmermann** (1–1)	Wieland (0–3)	**Gorzelanny** (1)	15,154	14–4
19	April 26	@ Padres	1–2	Cashner (1–1)	**Clippard** (1–2)	Street (2)	18,356	14–5
20	April 27	@ Dodgers	2–3	Kershaw (2–0)	**Detwiler** (2–1)	Jansen (1)	44,807	14–6
21	April 28	@ Dodgers	3–4 (10)	Wright (1–0)	**Gorzelanny** (1–1)		54,242	14–7
22	April 29	@ Dodgers	0–2	Capuano (3–0)	**Gonzalez** (2–1)	Jansen (2)	48,753	14–8

May(15–13)

#	Date	Opponent	Score	Win	Loss	Save	Attendance	Record
23	May 1	Diamondbacks	1–5	Cahill (2–2)	**Zimmermann** (1–2)		22,675	14–9
24	May 2	Diamondbacks	5–4	**Rodríguez** (1–1)	Putz (0–2)		16,274	15–9
25	May 3	Diamondbacks	2–1	**Detwiler** (3–1)	Kennedy (3–1)	**Rodríguez** (6)	19,656	16–9
26	May 4	Phillies	4–3 (11)	**Perry** (1–0)	Schwimer (0–1)		34,377	17–9
27	May 5	Phillies	7–1	**Gonzalez** (3–1)	Worley (2–2)		39,496	18–9
28	May 6	Phillies	3–9	Hamels (4–1)	**Zimmermann** (1–3)		33,058	18–10
29	May 8	@ Pirates	4–5	Watson (2–0)	**Rodríguez** (1–2)		10,323	18–11
30	May 9	@ Pirates	2–4	Lincoln (2–0)	**Detwiler** (3–2)	Hanrahan (6)	11,478	18–12
31	May 10	@ Pirates	4–2	**Strasburg** (3–0)	Correia (1–3)	**Rodríguez** (7)	15,381	19–12
32	May 11	@ Reds	7–3	**Gonzalez** (4–1)	Leake (0–5)		37,255	20–12
33	May 12	@ Reds	2–1	**Zimmermann** (2–3)	Arredondo (2–1)	**Rodríguez** (8)	42,294	21–12
34	May 13	@ Reds	6–9	Marshall (1–2)	**Rodríguez** (1–3)		28,361	21–13
35	May 14	Padres	8–5	**Stammen** (3–0)	Mikolas (0–1)	**Burnett** (1)	19,434	22–13
36	May 15	Padres	1–6	Bass (2–4)	**Strasburg** (3–1)		23,902	22–14
37	May 16	Pirates	7–4	**Gonzalez** (5–1)	Bédard (2–5)	**Rodríguez** (9)	25,942	23-14
38	May 17	Pirates	3–5	McDonald (3–2)	**Zimmermann** (2–4)	Hanrahan (8)	25,757	23–15
39	May 18	Orioles	1–2 (11)	Gregg (2–1)	**Mattheus** (2–1)	Strop (3)	36,680	23–16
40	May 19	Orioles	5–6	Hammel (5–1)	**Detwiler** (3–3)	Johnson (15)	42,331	23–17
41	May 20	Orioles	9–3	**Strasburg** (4–1)	Chen (4–1)		41,918	24–17
42	May 21	@ Phillies	2–1	**Gonzalez** (6–1)	Kendrick (0–4)	**Burnett** (2)	43,787	25–17
43	May 22	@ Phillies	5–2	**Zimmermann** (3–4)	Halladay (4–4)	**Clippard** (1)	45,569	26–17
44	May 23	@ Phillies	1–4	Hamels (7–1)	**Jackson** (1–2)		43,926	26–18
45	May 25	@ Braves	7–4	**Wang** (1–0)	Hudson (3–2)	**Clippard** (2)	37,663	27–18
46	May 26	@ Braves	8–4	**Strasburg** (5–1)	Medlen (1–1)	**Clippard** (3)	42,698	28–18
47	May 27	@ Braves	7–2	**Gonzalez** (7–1)	Beachy (5–3)		38,543	29–18
48	May 28	@ Marlins	3–5	Zambrano (3–3)	**Zimmermann** (3–5)	Bell (8)	31,528	29–19
49	May 29	@ Marlins	1–3	Sánchez (3–3)	**Jackson** (1–3)	Bell (9)	25,969	29–20
50	May 30	@ Marlins	3–5	Johnson (3–3)	**Wang** (1–1)	Bell (10)	24,224	29–21

June (15–11)

#	Date	Opponent	Score	Win	Loss	Save	Attendance	Record
-	June 1	Braves	Game Postponed (rain) Rescheduled for July 21 as part of a doubleheader					
51	June 2	Braves	2–0	**Strasburg** (6–1)	Beachy (5–4)	**Clippard** (4)	41,042	30–21
52	June 3	Braves	2–3	Hanson (6–4)	**Gonzalez** (7–2)	Kimbrel (16)	38,046	30–22
53	June 5	Mets	7–6 (12)	**Detwiler** (4–3)	Ramírez (0–1)		26,256	31–22
54	June 6	Mets	5–3	**Jackson** (2–3)	Hefner (1–3)	**Clippard** (5)	27,335	32–22
55	June 7	Mets	1–3	Dickey (9–1)	**Wang** (1–2)	Francisco (15)	32,096	32–23
56	June 8	@ Red Sox	7–4	**Strasburg** (7–1)	Doubront (6–3)	**Clippard** (6)	37,309	33–23
57	June 9	@ Red Sox	4–2	**Gonzalez** (8–2)	Matsuzaka (0–1)	**Clippard** (7)	37,534	34–23
58	June 10	@ Red Sox	4–3	**Gorzelanny** (2–1)	Aceves (0–4)	**Clippard** (8)	37,467	35–23
59	June 11	@ Blue Jays	6–3	**Jackson** (3–3)	Morrow (7–4)		18,513	36–23
60	June 12	@ Blue Jays	4–2	**Wang** (2–2)	Álvarez (3–6)	**Clippard** (9)	22,538	37–23
61	June 13	@ Blue Jays	6–2	**Strasburg** (8–1)	Drabek (4–7)		41,667	38–23
62	June 15	Yankees	2–7	Hughes (7–5)	**Gonzalez** (8–3)		41,406	38–24
63	June 16	Yankees	3–5 (14)	García (1–2)	**Lidge** (0–1)	Soriano (12)	41,287	38–25
64	June 17	Yankees	1–4	Nova (9–2)	**Jackson** (3–4)	Soriano (13)	41,442	38–26
65	June 19	Rays	4–5	Price (9–4)	**Wang** (2–3)	Rodney (20)	27,835	38–27
66	June 20	Rays	3–2	**Strasburg** (9–1)	Archer (0–1)	**Clippard** (10)	27,485	39–27
67	June 21	Rays	5–2	**Gonzalez** (9–3)	Peralta (0–3)	**Clippard** (11)	29,551	40–27
68	June 22	@ Orioles	1–2	Hammel (8–2)	**Zimmermann** (3–6)	Johnson (21)	45,891	40–28
69	June 23	@ Orioles	3–1	**Jackson** (4–4)	Chen (7–3)	**Clippard** (12)	46,298	41–28
70	June 24	@ Orioles	1–2	Strop (4–2)	**Burnett** (0–1)	Johnson (22)	41,794	41–29
71	June 25	@ Rockies	2–4	Roenicke (3–0)	**Strasburg** (9–2)	Betancourt (12)	40,177	41–30
72	June 26	@ Rockies	12–5	**Gonzalez** (10–3)	Friedrich (4–5)		36,110	42–30
73	June 27	@ Rockies	11–5	**Zimmermann** (4–6)	Cabrera (0–1)		36,045	43–30
74	June 28	@ Rockies	10–11 (11)	Ottavino (2–0)	**Stammen** (3–1)		33,957	43–31
75	June 29	@ Braves	5–4	**Burnett** (1–1)	Durbin (3–1)	**Clippard** (13)	32,299	44–31
76	June 30	@ Braves	5–7	Minor (4–6)	**Strasburg** (9–3)	Kimbrel (23)	26,491	44–32

July (17–9)

#	Date	Opponent	Score	Win	Loss	Save	Attendance	Record
77	July 1	@ Braves	8–4	**Gonzalez** (11–3)	Hudson (6–4)		18,796	45–32
78	July 3	Giants	9–3	**Zimmermann** (5–6)	Lincecum (3–9)		36,985	46–32
79	July 4	Giants	9–4	**Jackson** (5–4)	Bumgarner (10–5)		35,806	47–32
80	July 5	Giants	6–5	**Clippard** (2–2)	Casilla (2–4)		29,819	48–32
81	July 6	Rockies	1–5	Pomeranz (1–3)	**Strasburg** (9–4)	Betancourt (14)	28,951	48–33
82	July 7	Rockies	4–1	**Gonzalez** (12–3)	Francis (2–2)	**Clippard** (14)	28,032	49–33
83	July 8	Rockies	3–4	Brothers (4–2)	**Clippard** (2–3)	Betancourt (15)	25,125	49–34
**All–Star Break (July 9–12)**
84	July 13	@ Marlins	5–1	**Zimmermann** (6–6)	Johnson (5–6)		30,911	50–34
85	July 14	@ Marlins	1–2	Buehrle (9–8)	**Gonzalez** (12–4)	Cishek (2)	28,707	50–35
86	July 15	@ Marlins	4–0	**Strasburg** (10–4)	Nolasco (8–7)		29,889	51–35
87	July 16	@ Marlins	3–5	Zambrano (5–7)	**Jackson** (5–5)	Dunn (1)	29,248	51–36
88	July 17	Mets	5–4 (10)	**Mattheus** (3–1)	Byrdak (2–1)		26,342	52–36
89	July 18	Mets	4–3	**Zimmermann** (7–6)	Young (2–4)	**Clippard** (15)	31,660	53–36
90	July 19	Mets	5–9	Dickey (13–1)	**Gonzalez** (12–5)		36,389	53–37
91	July 20	Braves	10–11 (11)	O'Flaherty (2–0)	**Gorzelanny** (2–2)	Durbin (1)	34,228	53–38
92	July 21 (1)	Braves	0–4	Sheets (2–0)	**Jackson** (5–6)		28,745	53–39
93	July 21 (2)	Braves	5–2	**Lannan** (1–0)	Martínez (4–2)	**Clippard** (16)	40,047	54–39
94	July 22	Braves	9–2	**Detwiler** (5–3)	Jurrjens (3–4)		34,917	55–39
95	July 23	@ Mets	8–2 (10)	**Gorzelanny** (3–2)	Byrdak (2–2)		26,735	56–39
96	July 24	@ Mets	5–2	**Gonzalez** (13–5)	Dickey (13–2)	**Clippard** (17)	36,236	57–39
97	July 25	@ Mets	5–2	**Strasburg** (11–4)	Hefner (1–4)	**Clippard** (18)	35,517	58–39
98	July 26	@ Brewers	8–2	**Jackson** (6–6)	Gallardo (8–8)		33,176	59–39
99	July 27	@ Brewers	0–6	Fiers (4–4)	**Detwiler** (5–4)		35,858	59–40
100	July 28	@ Brewers	4–1	**Zimmermann** (8–6)	Wolf (3–7)	**Clippard** (19)	41,890	60–40
101	July 29	@ Brewers	11–10 (11)	**Stammen** (4–1)	Veras (3–4)	**Clippard** (20)	44,663	61–40
102	July 31	Phillies	0–8	Lee (2–6)	**Strasburg** (11–5)		30,167	61–41

August (19–10)

#	Date	Opponent	Score	Win	Loss	Save	Attendance	Record
103	August 1	Phillies	2–3	Worley (6–6)	**Jackson** (6–7)	Papelbon (23)	23,777	61–42
104	August 2	Phillies	3–0	**Detwiler** (6–4)	Hamels (11–6)	**Clippard** (21)	28,825	62–42
105	August 3 (1)	Marlins	7–4	**Lannan** (2–0)	Hand (0–1)	**Clippard** (22)	32,334 (Note: The two games on August 3 were played as a single-admission doubleheader with attendance counted only for the two games combined.)	63–42
106	August 3 (2)	Marlins	2–5	Johnson (7–7)	**Gonzalez** (13–6)	Cishek (6)	32,334	63–43
107	August 4	Marlins	10–7	**Mattheus** (4–1)	Dunn (0–1)		33,449	64–43
108	August 5	Marlins	4–1	**Strasburg** (12–5)	Nolasco (8–11)	**Storen** (1)	30,453	65–43
109	August 6	@ Astros	5–4 (11)	**Stammen** (5–1)	López (3–1)		13,843	66–43
110	August 7	@ Astros	3–2 (12)	**Storen** (1–0)	Storey (0–1)	**Clippard** (23)	14,273	67–43
111	August 8	@ Astros	4–3	**Gonzalez** (14–6)	Galarraga (0–2)		16,038	68–43
112	August 9	@ Astros	5–0	**Zimmermann** (9–6)	Harrell (9–8)		14,417	69–43
113	August 10	@ Diamondbacks	9–1	**Strasburg** (13–5)	Cahill (9–10)		29,362	70–43
114	August 11	@ Diamondbacks	6–5	**Jackson** (7–7)	Miley (12–8)	**Clippard** (24)	34,030	71–43
115	August 12	@ Diamondbacks	4–7	Corbin (4–4)	**Detwiler** (6–5)	Putz (22)	27,345	71–44
116	August 13	@ Giants	14–2	**Gonzalez** (15–6)	Vogelsong (10–6)		42,050	72–44
117	August 14	@ Giants	1–6	Bumgarner (13–7)	**Zimmermann** (9–7)		42,081	72–45
118	August 15	@ Giants	6–4	**Strasburg** (14–5)	Lincecum (6–13)	**Clippard** (25)	42,133	73–45
119	August 17	Mets	6–4	**Detwiler** (7–5)	Santana (6–9)	**Clippard** (26)	34,827	74–45
120	August 18	Mets	0–2	Niese (10–6)	**Jackson** (7–8)	Francisco (20)	42,662	74–46
121	August 19	Mets	5–2	**Gonzalez** (16–6)	Hefner (2–5)	**Clippard** (27)	33,764	75–46
122	August 20	Braves	5–4 (13)	**Stammen** (6–1)	Martínez (5–3)		21,298	76–46
123	August 21	Braves	4–1	**Strasburg** (15–5)	Maholm (11–8)	**Clippard** (28)	33,888	77–46
124	August 22	Braves	1–5	Medlen (5–1)	**Detwiler** (7–6)		29,111	77–47
125	August 24	@ Phillies	2–4	Kendrick (7–9)	**Jackson** (7–9)	Papelbon (28)	42,096	77–48
126	August 25	@ Phillies	2–4	Halladay (8–7)	**Gonzalez** (16–7)	Papelbon (29)	44,256	77–49
127	August 26	@ Phillies	1–4	Lee (3–7)	**Zimmerman** (9–8)	Lindblom (1)	44,653	77–50
128	August 28	@ Marlins	0–9	Nolasco (10–12)	**Strasburg** (15–6)		24,877	77–51
129	August 29	@ Marlins	8–4	**Detwiler** (8–6)	Turner (1–3)		24,909	78–51
130	August 30	Cardinals	8–1	**Jackson** (8–9)	García (3–6)		23,269	79–51
131	August 31	Cardinals	10–0	**Gonzalez** (17–7)	Wainwright (13–11)		29,499	80–51

September (16–12)

#	Date	Opponent	Score	Win	Loss	Save	Attendance	Record
132	September 1	Cardinals	9–10	Boggs (3–1)	**Storen** (1–1)	Motte (32)	34,004	80–52
133	September 2	Cardinals	4–3	**Mattheus** (5–1)	Lynn (13–6)	**Clippard** (29)	31,096	81–52
134	September 3	Cubs	2–1	**Detwiler** (9–6)	Samardzija (8–13)	**Clippard** (30)	23,215	82–52
135	September 4	Cubs	11–5	**Jackson** (9–9)	Rusin (0–2)		17,648	83–52
136	September 5	Cubs	9–1	**Gonzalez** (18–7)	Volstad (2–10)		21,244	84–52
137	September 6	Cubs	9–2	**Zimmerman** (10–8)	Germano (2–6)		22,447	85–52
138	September 7	Marlins	7–9 (10)	Gaudin (3–1)	**Clippard** (2–4)	Cishek (13)	28,533	85–53
139	September 8	Marlins	7–6 (10)	**Storen** (2–1)	Gaudin (3–2)		28,860	86–53
140	September 9	Marlins	0–8	Nolasco (12–12)	**Jackson** (9–10)		24,396	86–54
141	September 10	@ Mets	5–1	**Gonzalez** (19–7)	McHugh (0–2)		21,923	87–54
142	September 11	@ Mets	5–3	**Gorzelanny** (4–2)	Dickey (18–5)	**Clippard** (31)	22,596	88–54
143	September 12	@ Mets	2–0	**Lannan** (3–0)	Harvey (3–5)	**Storen** (2)	21,205	89–54
144	September 14	@ Braves	1–2	Kimbrel (2–1)	**Burnett** (1–2)		41,797	89–55
145	September 15	@ Braves	4–5	O'Flaherty (3–0)	**Mattheus** (5–2)	Kimbrel (36)	38,763	89–56
146	September 16	@ Braves	1–5	Minor (9–10)	**Gonzalez** (19–8)		29,094	89–57
-	September 18	Dodgers	Game Postponed (rain) Rescheduled for September 19 as part of a doubleheader					
147	September 19 (1)	Dodgers	3–1	**Zimmerman** (11–8)	Harang (9–10)	**Clippard** (32)	26,931 (Note: The two games on September 19 were played as a single-admission doubleheader with attendance counted only for the two games combined.)	90–57
148	September 19 (2)	Dodgers	6–7	Belisario (7–1)	**Clippard** (2–5)	League (12)	26,931	90–58
149	September 20	Dodgers	4–1	**Detwiler** (10–6)	Capuano (11–11)	**Storen** (3)	30,359	91–58
150	September 21	Brewers	2–4	Veras (5–4)	**Clippard** (2–6)	Axford (32)	30,382	91–59
151	September 22	Brewers	10–4	**Gonzalez** (20–8)	Peralta (2–1)		40,493	92–59
152	September 23	Brewers	2–6	Kintzler (3–0)	**Mattheus** (5–3)	Axford (33)	33,111	92–60
153	September 24	Brewers	12–2	**Zimmerman** (12–8)	Estrada (4–7)		25,302	93–60
154	September 25	@ Phillies	3–6	Hamels (16–6)	**Detwiler** (10–7)	Papelbon (37)	42,304	93–61
155	September 26	@ Phillies	8–4	**Lannan** (4–0)	Kendrick (10–12)		41,440	94–61
156	September 27	@ Phillies	7–3	**Gonzalez** (21–8)	Cloyd (2–2)		44,070	95–61
157	September 28	@ Cardinals	2–12	Wainwright (14–13)	**Jackson** (9–11)		39,166	95–62
158	September 29	@ Cardinals	6–4 (10)	**Storen** (3–1)	Freeman (0–2)	**Stammen** (1)	42,264	96–62
159	September 30	@ Cardinals	4–10	Lynn (18–7)	**Detwiler** (10–8)		40,084	96–63

October (2–1)

#	Date	Opponent	Score	Win	Loss	Save	Attendance	Record
160	October 1	Phillies	0–2	Kendrick (11–12)	**Lannan** (4–1)	Aumont (2)	35,387	96–64
161	October 2	Phillies	4–2	**Duke** (1–0)	Lindblom (3–5)	**Storen** (4)	33,546	97–64
162	October 3	Phillies	5–1	**Jackson** (10–11)	Lee (6–9)		37,075	98–64

== Postseason ==
=== Postseason game log ===
2012 postseason game log (2-3)
National League Division Series vs. NL Wild Card winner (2-3)

#	Date	Opponent	Score	Win	Loss	Save	Attendance	Series
1	October 7	@ Cardinals	3–2	Mattheus (1–0)	Boggs (0–1)	Storen (1)	47,078	1–0
2	October 8	@ Cardinals	4–12	Lynn (1–0)	Zimmermann (0–1)		45,840	1–1
3	October 10	Cardinals	0–8	Carpenter (1–0)	Jackson (0–1)		45,017	1–2
4	October 11	Cardinals	2–1	Storen (1–0)	Lynn (1–1)		44,392	2–2
5	October 12	Cardinals	7–9	Motte (1–0)	Storen (1–1)		45,966	2–3

=== Division Series ===
The Nationals played the St. Louis Cardinals in the Division Series. The Cardinals won the series, 3 games to 2.

==== Game 1, October 7 ====
3:07 p.m. (EDT) at Busch Stadium in St. Louis, Missouri

Team	1	2	3	4	5	6	7	8	9	R	H	E
Washington	0	1	0	0	0	0	0	2	0	3	8	2
St. Louis	0	2	0	0	0	0	0	0	0	2	3	1
Starting pitchers: WSH: Gio González (0–0); STL: Adam Wainwright (0–0) --> WP: Ryan Mattheus (1–0) LP: Mitchell Boggs (0–1) Sv: Drew Storen (1)

==== Game 2, October 8 ====
4:37 p.m. (EDT) at Busch Stadium in St. Louis, Missouri

Team	1	2	3	4	5	6	7	8	9	R	H	E
Washington	0	1	0	0	2	0	1	0	0	4	10	2
St. Louis	0	4	1	2	0	1	0	4	X	12	13	0
Starting pitchers: WSH: Jordan Zimmermann (0–0); STL: Jaime García (0–0) --> WP: Lance Lynn (1–0) LP: Jordan Zimmermann (0–1); Home runs: WSH: Ryan Zimmerman (1), Adam LaRoche (1); STL: Allen Craig (1), Daniel Descalso (1), Carlos Beltrán 2 (2)

==== Game 3, October 10 ====
1:07 p.m. (EDT) at Nationals Park in Washington, D.C.

Team	1	2	3	4	5	6	7	8	9	R	H	E
St. Louis	1	3	0	0	0	1	1	2	0	8	14	1
Washington	0	0	0	0	0	0	0	0	0	0	7	0
WP: Chris Carpenter (1–0) LP: Edwin Jackson (0–1); Home runs: STL: Pete Kozma (1); WSH: None

==== Game 4, October 11 ====
4:07 p.m. (EDT) at Nationals Park in Washington, D.C.

Team	1	2	3	4	5	6	7	8	9	R	H	E
St. Louis	0	0	1	0	0	0	0	0	0	1	3	0
Washington	0	1	0	0	0	0	0	0	1	2	3	1
Starting pitchers: STL: Kyle Lohse (0–0); WSH: Ross Detwiler (0–0) --> WP: Drew Storen (1-0) LP: Lance Lynn (1-1); Home runs: STL: None; WSH: Adam LaRoche (2), Jayson Werth (1)

==== Game 5, October 12 ====
8:37 p.m. (EDT) at Nationals Park in Washington, D.C.

Team	1	2	3	4	5	6	7	8	9	R	H	E
St. Louis	0	0	0	1	2	0	1	1	4	9	11	0
Washington	3	0	3	0	0	0	0	1	0	7	11	0
Starting pitchers: STL: Adam Wainwright (0–1); WSH: Gio González (1–0) --> WP: Jason Motte (1–0) LP: Drew Storen (1–1); Home runs: STL: Daniel Descalso (2); WSH: Ryan Zimmerman (2), Bryce Harper (1), Michael Morse (1)

== Player statistics ==
=== Regular season ===
Both tables are sortable.

Note: Team leaders in each category are noted in bold.

Note: * = League leader in category.

==== Batting ====
Note: POS = Position; G = Games played; AB = At bats; R = Runs scored; H = Hits; 2B = Doubles; 3B = Triples; HR = Home runs; RBI = Runs batted in; AVG = Batting average; SB = Stolen bases

Complete offensive statistics are available here.

POS	Player	G	AB	R	H	2B	3B	HR	RBI	AVG	SB
CF	Rick Ankiel	68	158	15	36	10	2	5	15	.228	1
OF	Roger Bernadina	129	227	25	66	11	0	5	25	.291	15
OF	Corey Brown	19	25	4	5	2	0	1	3	.200	0
P	Sean Burnett	70	0	0	0	0	0	0	0	–	0
CF	Brett Carroll	5	2	2	0	0	0	0	0	.000	0
P	Tyler Clippard	74	0	0	0	0	0	0	0	–	0
UT	Mark DeRosa	48	85	13	16	5	0	0	6	.188	1
SS	Ian Desmond	130	513	72	150	33	2	25	73	**.292**	**21**
P	Ross Detwiler	33	45	0	2	0	0	0	1	.044	0
P	Zach Duke	8	1	0	0	0	0	0	0	.000	0
2B	Danny Espinosa	**160**	**594**	82	147	**37**	2	17	56	.247	20
C	Jesús Flores	83	277	22	59	12	1	6	26	.213	1
P	Christian Garcia	13	0	0	0	0	0	0	0	–	0
P	Gio Gonzalez	32	64	2	6	1	0	1	4	.094	0
P	Mike Gonzalez	47	0	0	0	0	0	0	0	–	0
P	Tom Gorzelanny	45	6	0	2	0	0	0	1	.333	0
CF	Bryce Harper	139	533	**98**	144	26	**9**	22	59	.270	18
IF	César Izturis	5	4	4	2	1	0	0	0	.500	0
P	Edwin Jackson	34	57	6	13	0	0	0	0	.228	0
P	John Lannan	6	9	0	1	0	0	0	0	.111	0
1B	Adam LaRoche	154	571	76	155	35	1	**33**	**100**	.271	1
C	Sandy Leon	12	30	2	8	2	0	0	2	.267	0
P	Brad Lidge	11	0	0	0	0	0	0	0	–	0
UT	Steve Lombardozzi Jr.	126	384	40	105	16	3	3	27	.273	5
C	Carlos Maldonado	4	9	0	0	0	0	0	1	.000	0
P	Ryan Mattheus	66	1	0	0	0	0	0	0	.000	0
LF	Tyler Moore	75	156	20	41	9	0	10	29	.263	3
LF	Michael Morse	102	406	53	118	17	1	18	62	.291	0
OF	Xavier Nady	40	102	6	16	3	0	3	6	.157	1
P	Ryan Perry	7	0	0	0	0	0	0	0	–	0
OF	Eury Pérez	13	5	3	1	0	0	0	0	.200	3
C	Wilson Ramos	25	83	11	22	2	0	3	10	.265	0
P	Henry Rodriguez	35	0	0	0	0	0	0	0	–	0
C	Jhonatan Solano	12	35	6	11	3	0	2	6	.314	1
P	Craig Stammen	59	6	0	0	0	0	0	0	.000	0
P	Drew Storen	37	0	0	0	0	0	0	0	–	0
P	Stephen Strasburg	28	47	4	13	4	0	1	7	.277	0
C	Kurt Suzuki	43	146	17	39	5	0	5	25	.267	1
CI	Chad Tracy	73	93	7	25	7	0	3	14	.269	0
P	Chien-Ming Wang	10	6	1	1	1	0	0	0	.167	0
RF	Jayson Werth	81	300	42	90	21	3	5	31	.300	8
3B	Ryan Zimmerman	145	578	93	**163**	36	1	25	95	.282	5
P	Jordan Zimmermann	32	57	5	11	2	0	1	4	.193	0
	**Team totals**	**162**	**5615**	**731**	**1468**	**301**	**25**	**194**	**688**	**.261**	**105**

==== Pitching ====
Note: POS = Position; G = Games played; GS = Games started; IP = Innings pitched; H = Hits allowed; W = Wins; L = Losses; SV = Saves; HLD = Holds; ERA = Earned run average; SO = Strikeouts; WHIP = Walks and hits per inning pitched

Complete pitching statistics are available here.

POS	Player	G	GS	IP	H	W	L	SV	HLD	ERA	SO	WHIP
RP	Sean Burnett	70	0	56.2	58	1	2	2	**31**	2.38	57	1.24
CL	Tyler Clippard	**74**	0	72.2	55	2	6	**32**	13	3.72	84	1.16
SP	Ross Detwiler	33	27	164.1	149	10	8	0	1	3.40	105	1.22
	Zach Duke	8	0	13.2	11	1	0	0	0	1.32	10	1.10
	Christian Garcia	13	0	12.2	8	0	0	0	4	2.13	15	0.79
SP	Gio Gonzalez	32	**32**	**199.1**	149	**21***	8	0	0	**2.89**	**207**	**1.13**
RP	Mike Gonzalez	47	0	35.2	31	0	0	0	7	3.03	39	1.32
	Tom Gorzelanny	45	1	72.0	65	4	2	1	9	2.88	62	1.32
SP	Edwin Jackson	31	31	189.2	173	10	**11**	0	0	4.03	168	1.22
	John Lannan	6	6	32.1	33	4	1	0	0	4.13	17	1.44
	Brad Lidge	11	0	9.1	12	0	1	2	0	9.64	10	2.46
RP	Ryan Mattheus	66	0	66.1	57	5	3	0	18	2.85	41	1.15
	Ryan Perry	7	0	8.0	12	1	0	0	0	10.13	3	1.75
RP	Henry Rodriguez	35	0	29.1	19	1	3	9	2	5.83	31	1.40
RP	Craig Stammen	59	0	88.1	70	6	1	1	10	2.34	87	1.20
RP	Drew Storen	37	0	30.1	22	3	1	4	10	2.37	24	0.99
SP	Stephen Strasburg	28	28	159.1	136	15	6	0	0	3.16	197	1.15
	Chien-Ming Wang	10	5	32.1	50	2	3	0	0	6.68	15	2.01
SP	Jordan Zimmermann	32	**32**	195.2	**186**	12	8	0	0	2.94	153	1.17
	**Team totals**	**162**	**162**	**1468.1**	**1296**	**98**	**64**	**51**	**105**	**3.33**	**1325**	**1.221**

==== Team leaders ====
Qualifying players only.

===== Batting =====
Stat	Player	Total
Avg.	Ian Desmond	.292
HR	Adam LaRoche	33
RBI	Adam LaRoche	100
R	Bryce Harper	98
H	Ryan Zimmerman	163
SB	Ian Desmond	21

===== Pitching =====
Stat	Player	Total
W	Gio González	21
L	Edwin Jackson	11
ERA	Gio González	2.89
SO	Gio González	207
SV	Tyler Clippard	32
IP	Gio González	199.1

=== Postseason ===
Both tables are sortable.

==== Batting ====
Note: POS = Position; G = Games played; AB = At bats; R = Runs scored; H = Hits; 2B = Doubles; 3B = Triples; HR = Home runs; RBI = Runs batted in; AVG = Batting average; SB = Stolen bases

Complete offensive statistics can be found here.

POS	Player	G	AB	R	H	2B	3B	HR	RBI	AVG	SB
OF	Roger Bernadina	4	2	0	0	0	0	0	0	.000	0
P	Sean Burnett	2	0	0	0	0	0	0	0	–	0
P	Tyler Clippard	3	0	0	0	0	0	0	0	–	0
SS	Ian Desmond	5	19	2	7	1	0	0	0	.368	0
P	Ross Detwiler	1	1	0	0	0	0	0	0	.000	0
2B	Danny Espinosa	5	15	0	1	0	0	0	0	.067	0
P	Christian Garcia	2	0	0	0	0	0	0	0	–	0
P	Gio Gonzalez	2	3	0	0	0	0	0	0	.000	0
P	Mike Gonzalez	1	0	0	0	0	0	0	0	–	0
P	Tom Gorzelanny	1	0	0	0	0	0	0	0	–	0
CF	Bryce Harper	5	23	2	3	1	1	1	2	.130	0
P	Edwin Jackson	2	1	0	0	0	0	0	0	.000	0
1B	Adam LaRoche	5	17	4	3	0	0	2	2	.176	0
UT	Steve Lombardozzi Jr.	3	3	0	1	0	0	0	0	.333	0
P	Ryan Mattheus	3	0	0	0	0	0	0	0	–	0
LF	Tyler Moore	1	1	0	1	0	0	0	2	1.000	0
LF	Michael Morse	5	19	2	5	0	0	1	2	.263	0
P	Craig Stammen	4	0	0	0	0	0	0	0	–	0
P	Drew Storen	4	0	0	0	0	0	0	0	–	0
C	Kurt Suzuki	5	17	0	4	0	0	0	2	.235	0
CI	Chad Tracy	5	4	0	0	0	0	0	0	.000	0
RF	Jayson Werth	5	21	3	5	1	0	1	1	.238	0
3B	Ryan Zimmerman	5	21	3	8	1	0	2	4	.381	0
P	Jordan Zimmermann	2	1	0	1	0	0	0	1	1.000	0
	**Team totals**	**5**	**168**	**16**	**39**	**4**	**1**	**7**	**16**	**.232**	**0**

==== Pitching ====
Note: POS = Position; G = Games played; GS = Games Started IP = Innings pitched; W = Wins; L = Losses; SV = Saves; HLD = Holds; ERA = Earned run average; SO= Strikeouts; WHIP = Walks and hits per inning pitched

Complete pitching statistics can be found here.

POS	Player	G	GS	IP	W	L	SV	HLD	ERA	SO	WHIP
RP	Sean Burnett	2	0	1.0	0	0	0	1	27.00	1	4.00
CL	Tyler Clippard	3	0	3.0	0	0	0	2	3.00	5	0.67
SP	Ross Detwiler	1	1	6.0	0	0	0	0	0.00	2	1.00
	Christian Garcia	2	0	2.2	0	0	0	0	3.38	4	2.25
SP	Gio Gonzalez	2	2	10.0	0	0	0	0	4.50	10	1.70
RP	Mike Gonzalez	1	0	1.0	0	0	0	0	9.00	1	1.00
	Tom Gorzelanny	1	0	0.1	0	0	0	0	0.00	0	3.00
SP	Edwin Jackson	2	1	6.0	0	1	0	1	7.50	6	2.00
RP	Ryan Mattheus	3	0	3.0	1	0	0	0	6.00	0	1.33
RP	Craig Stammen	4	0	3.0	0	0	0	1	9.00	3	2.33
RP	Drew Storen	4	0	4.0	1	1	1	0	9.00	6	1.50
SP	Jordan Zimmermann	2	1	4.0	0	1	0	0	11.25	5	1.75
	**Team totals**	**5**	**5**	**44.0**	**2**	**3**	**1**	**5**	**6.14**	**43**	**1.659**

== Awards and honors ==
=== All-Stars ===
- Ian Desmond, SS
- Gio González, P
- Bryce Harper, OF
- Stephen Strasburg, P

Ian Desmond did not participate in the 2012 Major League Baseball All-Star Game due to injury.

=== Annual awards ===
- National League Manager of the Year: Davey Johnson
- National League Rookie of the Year: Bryce Harper
- Gold Glove: Adam LaRoche, 1B
- Silver Slugger: Adam LaRoche, 1B; Ian Desmond, SS; Stephen Strasburg, P

== Farm system ==
Level	Team	League	Manager
AAA	Syracuse Chiefs	International League	Tony Beasley
AA	Harrisburg Senators	Eastern League	Matthew LeCroy
A	Potomac Nationals	Carolina League	Brian Rupp
A	Hagerstown Suns	South Atlantic League	Brian Daubach
A-Short Season	Auburn Doubledays	New York–Penn League	Gary Cathcart
Rookie	GCL Nationals	Gulf Coast League	Tripp Keister
