= Lance Lynn =

American baseball player (born 1987)

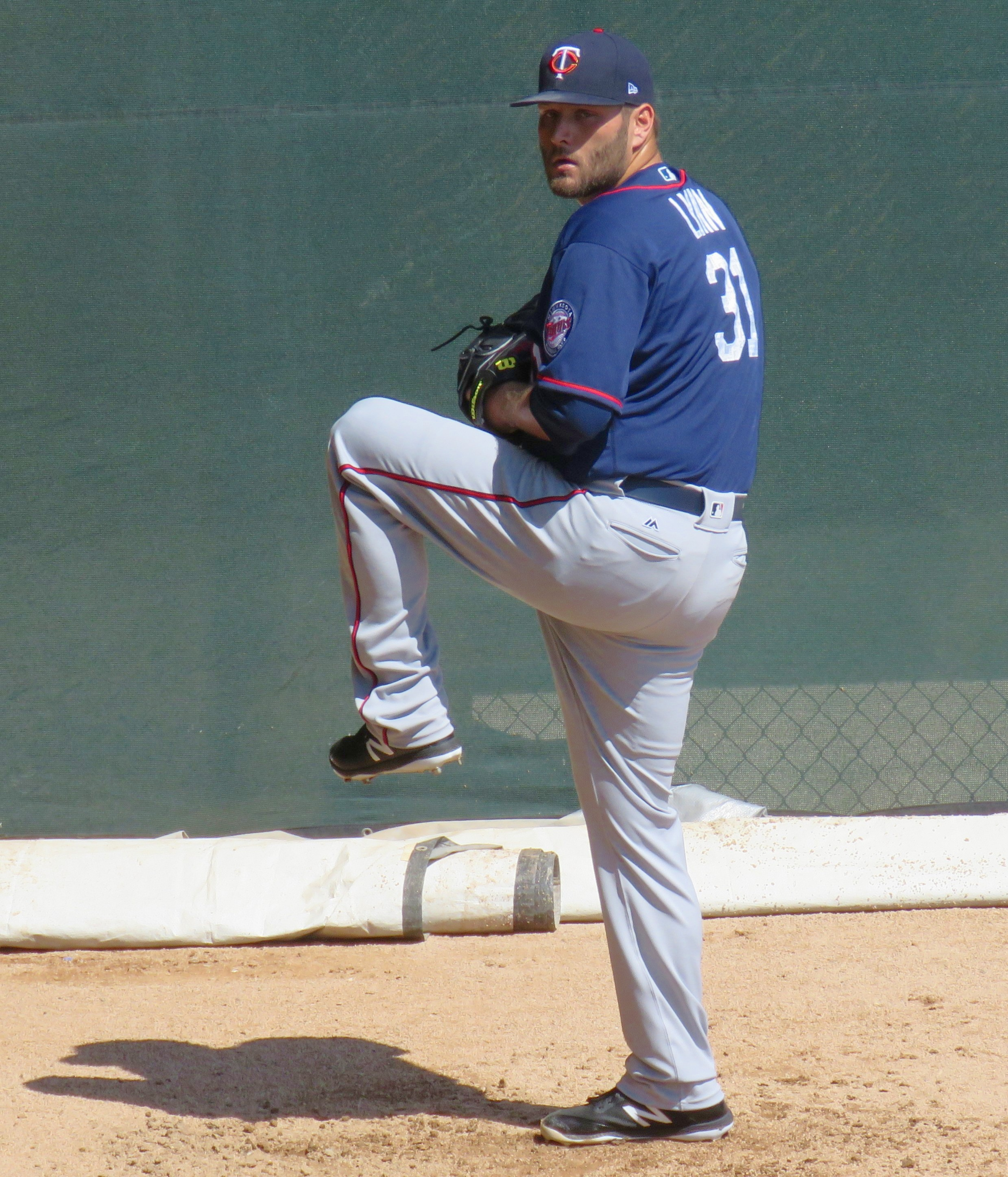
- Lynn with the Minnesota Twins in 2018
- Pitcher
- Born: May 12, 1987 (age 39); Indianapolis, Indiana, U.S.
- Batted: Switch Threw: Right

MLB debut
- June 2, 2011, for the St. Louis Cardinals

Last MLB appearance
- September 17, 2024, for the St. Louis Cardinals

MLB statistics
- Win–loss record: 143–99
- Earned run average: 3.74
- Strikeouts: 2,015
- Stats at Baseball Reference

Teams
- St. Louis Cardinals (2011–2015, 2017); Minnesota Twins (2018); New York Yankees (2018); Texas Rangers (2019–2020); Chicago White Sox (2021–2023); Los Angeles Dodgers (2023); St. Louis Cardinals (2024)

Career highlights and awards
- 2× All-Star (2012, 2021); World Series champion (2011)
Medals
Men's baseball
Representing United States
World Baseball Classic
Silver medal – second place	2023 Miami	Team
Pan American Games
Silver medal – second place	2007 Rio de Janeiro	Team

Michael Lance Lynn (born May 12, 1987) is an American former professional baseball pitcher. Between 2011 and 2024, he played 13 seasons in Major League Baseball (MLB) for the St. Louis Cardinals, Minnesota Twins, New York Yankees, Texas Rangers, Chicago White Sox, and Los Angeles Dodgers.

Playing college baseball for the Ole Miss Rebels, Lynn set the school's single-season (146) and career (332) pitching strikeout records. The Cardinals selected him in the first round of the 2008 MLB draft from the University of Mississippi. In 2009, he was named the Cardinals organizational Pitcher of the Year after playing in three levels and totaling a 2.85 earned run average and 124 strikeouts in 148 2/3 innings pitched. He made his MLB debut on June 2, 2011, was a member of the Cardinals' World Series championship team that year, and a National League All-Star in 2012.

On May 27, 2014, Lynn pitched his first MLB career complete game and shutout. He earned his 500th MLB career strikeout three weeks later, and 50th career win April 15, 2015. Through 2015, he was the Cardinals' all-time franchise leader in career strikeouts per 9 innings pitched, with 8.7. After undergoing Tommy John surgery, Lynn missed the entire 2016 season. On June 18, 2023, he pitched 16 strikeouts against the Seattle Mariners in 7 1/3 innings, tying the franchise record for most strikeouts by a White Sox pitcher in a single game.

== Early life ==
Lynn was born on May 12, 1987, in Indianapolis, Indiana, to Mike and Jenny Lynn. He was part of the Brownsburg, Indiana, Little League team that appeared in the 1999 Little League World Series. Brownsburg won the Central Regional Championship in Williamsport, Pennsylvania. He attended Brownsburg High School, where he played on the baseball team, with teammate Drew Storen, a fellow future major league pitcher. Lynn earned All-State honors in his sophomore and junior season.

As a junior, Lynn hit .509 with 14 home runs and 46 runs batted in (RBIs). As a pitcher, he posted a 1.26 earned run average (ERA) and 160 strikeouts (SO) in 100 innings pitched (IP), a 10–3 win–loss record, and three saves. His team went 36–0 his senior year as they won the 4A state championship. That year, he hit .400 with 14 home runs; his ERA was 0.71 and record was 16–0.

At Brownsburg, Lynn's cumulative batting totals included a .473 average and 92 RBIs. His career pitching totals were a 39–4 record, 1.10 ERA, seven saves, and 455 strikeouts in 288 IP. For the state of Indiana, Lynn was the Gatorade Player of the Year in 2005. He was also a Louisville Slugger and Electronic Arts All-America selection. When Lynn played at the Area Code Games, Nike named him an All-Star, and he was teammates with fellow future Ole Miss Rebels baseball signees Evan Button and Scott Van Slyke.

The Seattle Mariners selected Lynn in the sixth round of the June 2005 MLB draft, but he did not sign.

== College career ==
He instead chose to attend the University of Mississippi to play college baseball for the Ole Miss Rebels. In 2007, he set the Ole Miss single season (146) and career (332) strikeout records. He was named an All-Southeastern Conference second-team pitcher in 2007 and 2008. His overall college record was 22–12 with a 3.95 ERA.

== Professional career ==
=== Draft and minor leagues ===
The St. Louis Cardinals selected Lynn in the first round, with the 39th overall pick of the 2008 MLB draft.

In 2009, Lynn was named the Cardinals' organizational Pitcher of the Year after jumping three levels in his first full professional season. His final start for the year was for the Triple-A Memphis Redbirds of the Pacific Coast League (PCL). His season totals included a 2.85 ERA and 124 strikeouts in 148 2/3 innings. He led all Cardinals minor league pitchers in strikeouts from 2009 to 2010 (141 in 2010).

Spending the entire 2010 season with Memphis, Lynn also led all Cardinals minor league pitchers in games started (29), was second with 164 innings pitched and 13 wins, and ninth with 7.74 strikeouts per 9 innings pitched (K/9). In addition, he led the PCL in strikeouts and games started and was second in wins in 2010. On September 10, 2010, Lynn broke the Redbirds' single-game franchise strikeout record, with 16 against the Oklahoma City RedHawks in a playoff game. It was also the highest strikeout performance that year in all the minor leagues.

=== St. Louis Cardinals (2011–2015, 2017) ===
==== 2011–2013 ====
The club added Lynn to the 40 man roster and activated him on June 2, 2011. He made his MLB debut that night at Busch Stadium against the San Francisco Giants. In 34 1/3 innings in the regular season with the Cardinals, Lynn notched 40 strikeouts while allowing 25 hits and 11 walks. A pulled flank muscle in August prevented him from appearing in a game until a surprise appearance in the postseason. On October 10, Lynn was awarded the win after throwing exactly one pitch in Game 2 of the National League Championship Series (NLCS) against the Milwaukee Brewers. In the World Series, Lynn gave up back-to-back home runs in the top of the seventh to Adrián Beltré and Nelson Cruz. However, he won the World Series with the Cardinals, making a total of 10 appearances during the postseason after appearing in just 18 games during the 2011 regular season.

After arriving at Cardinals spring training in February 2012, Lynn announced he would begin wearing the number 31. When Chris Carpenter went on the disabled list (DL) early in the season, Lynn replaced him in the rotation. He started strong, winning his first six games with an ERA of 1.40. One of his best games came on June 13 against the Chicago White Sox. He completed 7 1/3 innings, struck out a career-high 12 batters, and gave up only three hits. That performance lowered his ERA to 2.42. He also became the second player that season to win 10 games behind R. A. Dickey.

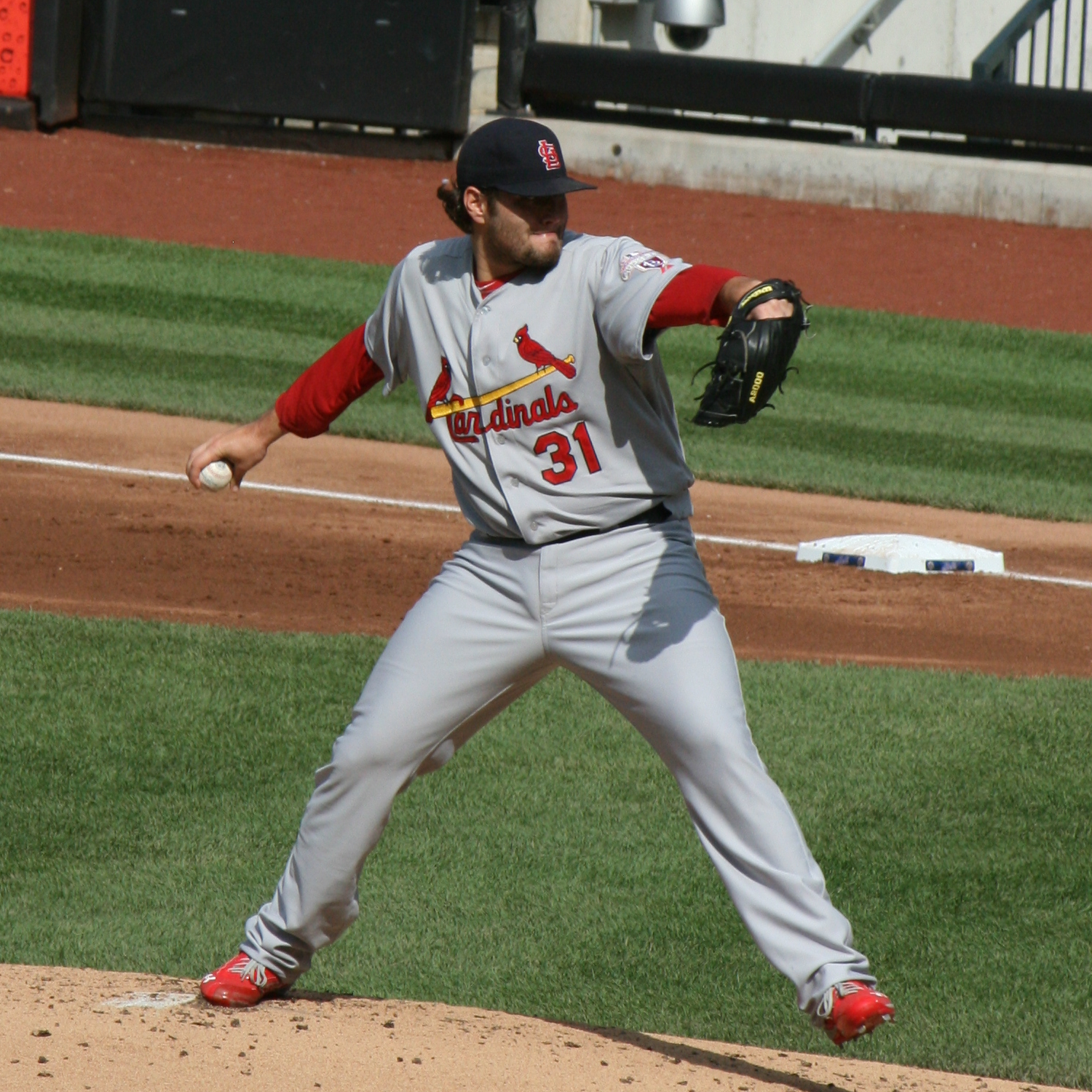
Lynn pitching for the Cardinals in 2012

Lynn finished his first half with a 3.41 ERA and 11–4 record in 17 starts. Subsequently, he was named to his first All-Star Game. However, he scuffled with a 5.23 ERA in his next eight starts, and was removed from the rotation. Joe Kelly replaced him in the rotation. Through his first 25 starts, he was 13–5 with a 3.93 ERA. His August ERA ballooned to 6.66 and his second-half ERA overall was 4.32. Lynn attributed his inconsistency to weight gain and poor conditioning. He finished the regular season with an 18–7 record and 180 strikeouts, 3.78 ERA in 35 games, 29 starts and 176 innings. His 9.2 K/9 rate placed fourth in franchise history. He placed second in the NL in wins, seventh in winning percentage, and fourth in K/9. Lynn was added back to the rotation in the NLDS against the Washington Nationals after the team shifted Jaime García to the DL due to a rotator cuff injury. He was the Game 5 starter in the NLCS against the San Francisco Giants, in which the Cardinals held a 3–1 series lead. However, he gave up four runs in 3 2/3 innings as the Cardinals eventually lost the series.

The right-hander made a conscious effort to change his eating and conditioning habits to reach 200 innings in 2013. He showed up to ST weighing 239 pounds, about 41 pounds lighter than his last start in the 2012 NLCS. As a result, his teammates needled him with jokes, such as "Where's your other half?" from Adam Wainwright and "Who's the new guy?" from two others. He reached his season goal of 200 innings pitched, with 201 2/3, and was 15–10 with 198 strikeouts and 3.97 ERA. His ERA remained steady: 4.00 in the first half, 3.93 in the second of the season. He improved his ERA in September to 2.12. His win total was sixth in the NL, strikeouts ninth, and 33 starts placed second.

==== 2014–2017 ====
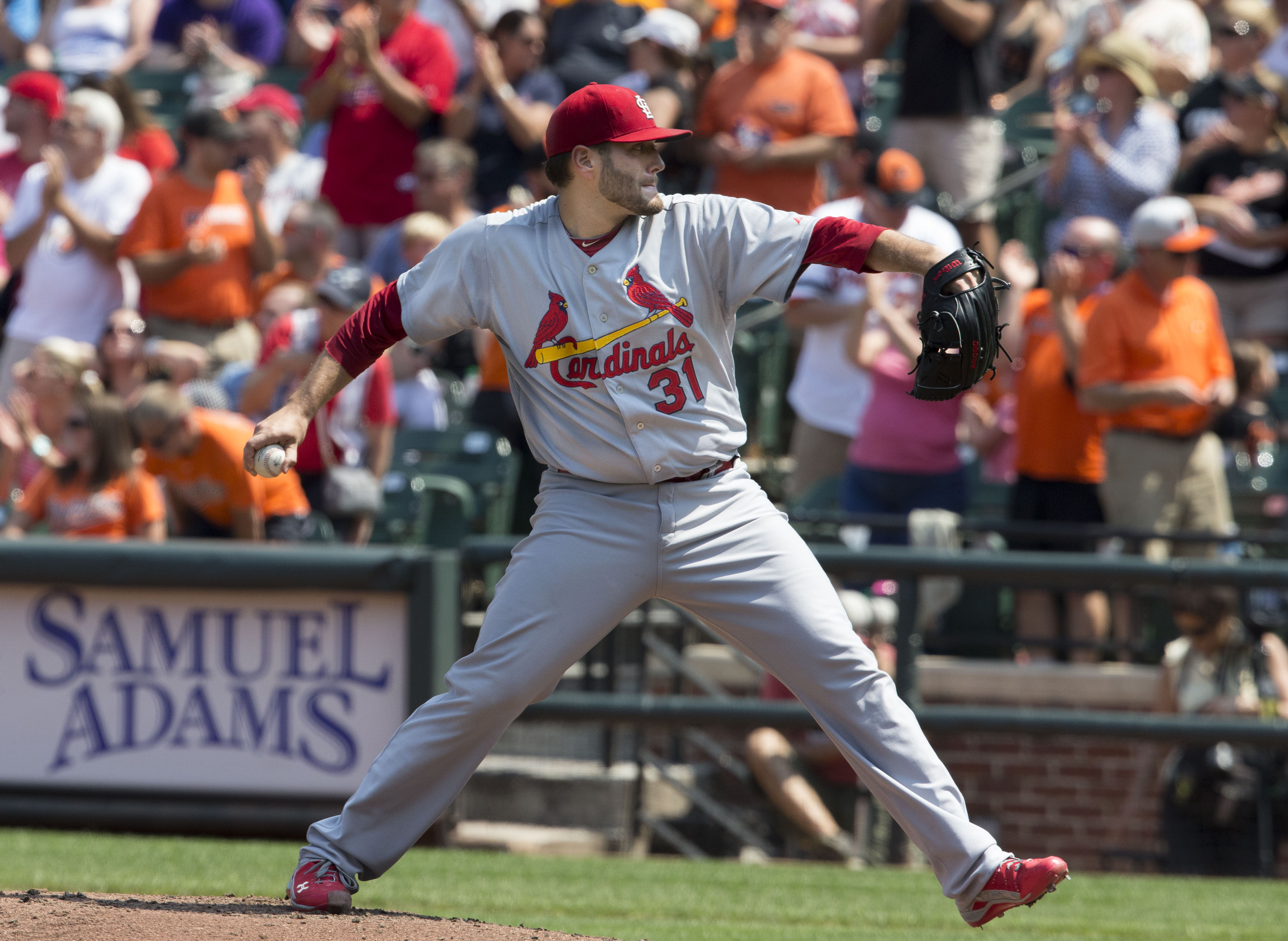
Lynn pitching for the Cardinals in 2014

On the recommendation of the team chef Simon Lusky, Lynn decreased the amount of refined carbohydrates and fats in his diet. He showed up to 2014 Spring Training with an even slimmer look. In a Spring Training game on March 14, Lynn struck out 10 Atlanta Braves in four innings, including the final eight hitters he faced. On April 14, the Cardinals stopped the Milwaukee Brewers' nine-game winning streak behind Lynn's seven scoreless innings. Lynn, who had entered the game with a 6.55 ERA for the season, won his third decision behind 11 strikeouts and just three hits allowed as St. Louis prevailed 4–0. Against the Washington Nationals on April 19, he stroked his first career extra base hit — an RBI double — while picking up the decision for the win in a 4–3 victory.

On May 27, Lynn pitched his first career complete game against the New York Yankees, a shutout. Making his 100th career MLB appearance and another start against the Nationals on Friday, June 13, Lynn pitched five perfect innings on his way to two hits through eight innings in a 1–0 victory over Jordan Zimmermann. In a 3–2 loss to the New York Mets five days later, he notched his 500th career strikeout, through 503 career innings. Baffling the Colorado Rockies on the corners of the strike zone on June 23, Lynn pitched another eight shutout innings in an 8–0 victory at Coors Field while allowing just three hits. The Cardinals made the playoffs again in 2014, and Lynn started one game each in the NLDS against the Dodgers and in the NLCS against the Giants. He finished with a 3.08 combined ERA and 11 strikeouts in 11 2/3 innings.

Arbitration-eligible for the first time in his career, Lynn and the Cardinals agreed to a three-year, $22 million contract on January 15, 2015. It bought out his three remaining years before free agency and included up to an additional $1.5 million in performance bonuses. Only Wainwright (53) and Clayton Kershaw (51) surpassed his win total (48) in the National League over the previous three seasons. In that time, Lynn allowed a 3.48 ERA and 1.300 WHIP over 95 starts.

Making his 99th career start on April 15, 2015, Lynn earned his 50th career win in a 4–2 victory over Milwaukee. It was his 13th win in the month of April since 2012, the highest total in MLB. Through his first 12 starts of the season, he was 4–4 with a 3.07 ERA. However, after his June 7 start against the Dodgers, he suffered a right forearm strain. The Cardinals placed him on the DL on June 12. Lynn returned from the DL on June 24. He returned to action the next day against the Miami Marlins, pitching six scoreless innings in a 5–1 victory.

In a 10–5 loss to the Pirates on August 13, 2015, Lynn recorded just two outs while allowing seven runs total, three earned, a home run and six hits while throwing 41 pitches. It was the shortest outing of his career as a starter, and the quickest exit for a Cardinals starter since Anthony Reyes on October 1, 2006, by reason other than injury. After returning from the DL in June, Lynn started 19 games with an 8–7 record, 3.00 ERA and completed 102 innings, but made it through seven innings just once in his last six starts of the season.

He finished the 2015 season with a 12–11 record and 3.03 ERA in 175 1/3 innings. He led all major league pitchers in fastball percentage (85.4%). Through that point in his major league career, he allowed a .248 batting average against, and was the Cardinals all-time franchise leader with 8.7 K/9 among all players with at least 500 innings pitched for the club.

On November 10, 2015, the Cardinals announced that Lynn would miss the 2016 season after undergoing Tommy John surgery (TJS). He began a rehab stint with the Palm Beach Cardinals on August 15, 2016, pitching 1 2/3 scoreless innings.

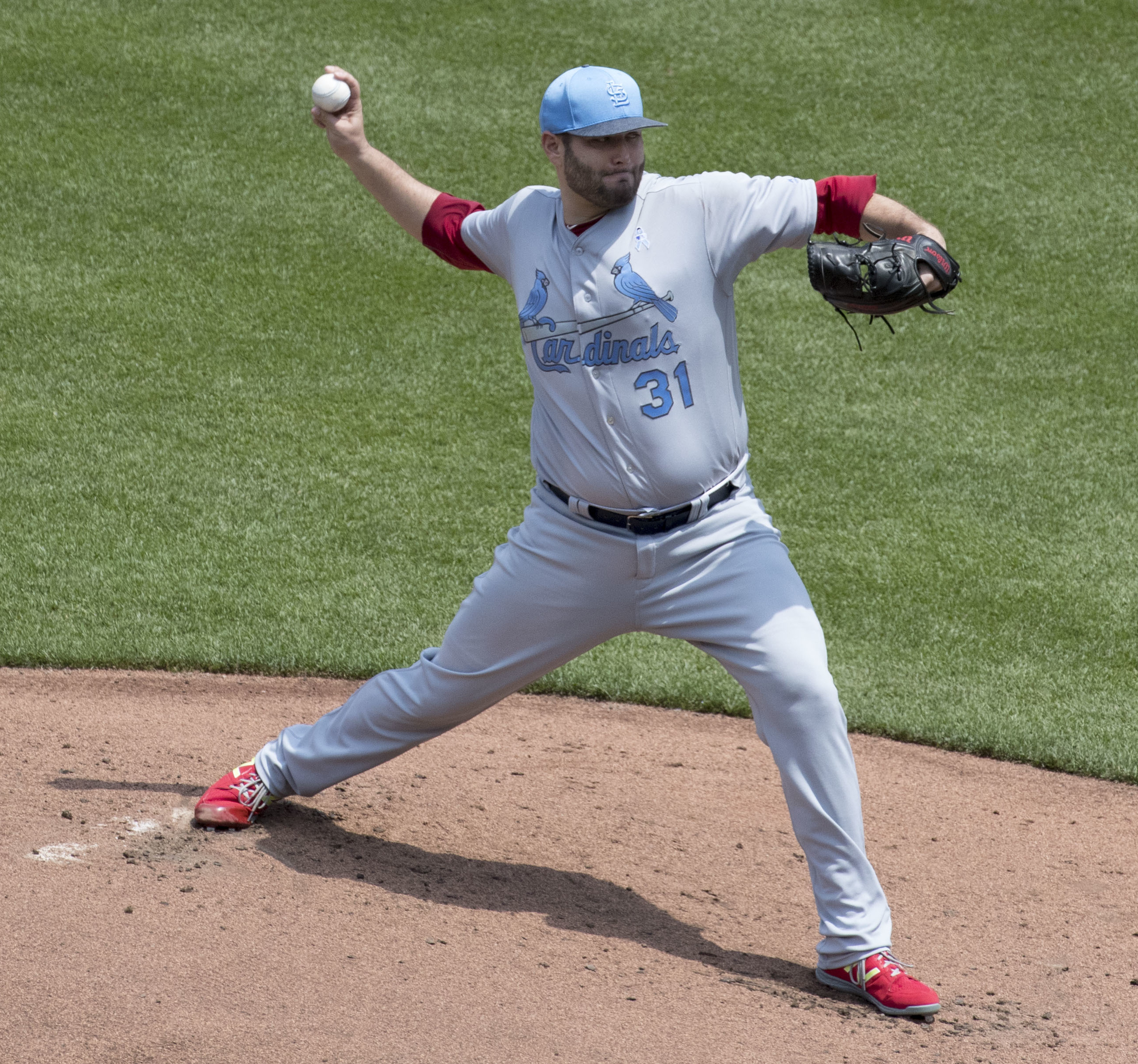
Lynn pitching for the Cardinals in 2017 Father's Day Weekend

Lynn rejoined the Cardinals' starting rotation in 2017, and finished the year making 33 starts with an 11–8 record and a 3.43 ERA. He led the major leagues in holding opposing batters to the lowest batting average on balls in play (.244). He also led all major league pitchers in fastball percentage (81.1%). After the season, Lynn became a free agent for the first time of his career.

=== Minnesota Twins (2018) ===
On March 12, 2018, Lynn signed a one-year, $12 million contract with the Minnesota Twins. He struggled in his Minnesota debut, giving up five earned runs, all in the first inning, and walking six in four innings against the Pittsburgh Pirates, taking the loss as Pittsburgh defeated Minnesota 5–4. During the first two months of the season, he compiled an ERA of 5.94.

=== New York Yankees (2018) ===
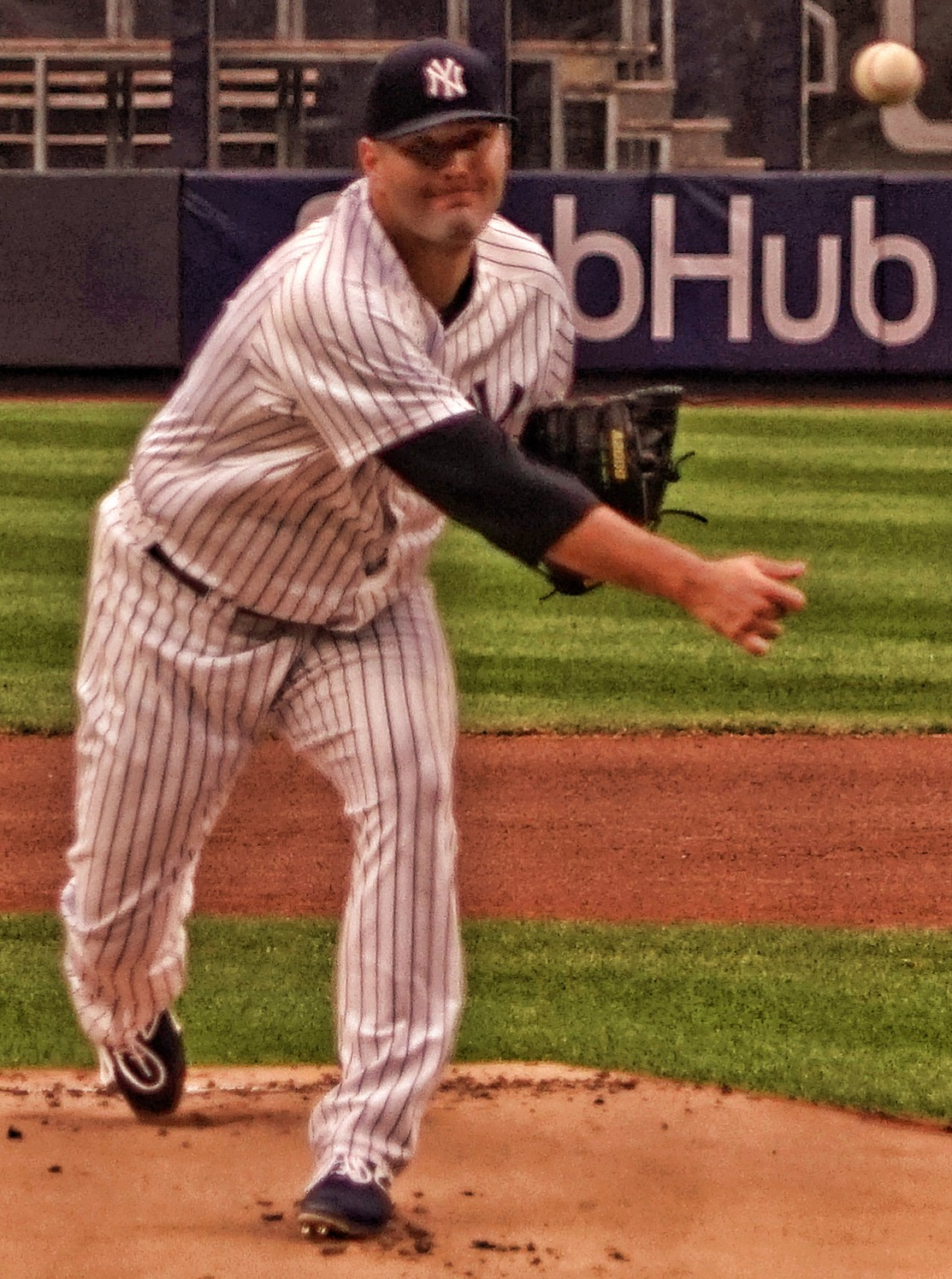
Lynn pitching for the New York Yankees in 2018

On July 30, 2018, the Twins traded Lynn and cash considerations to the New York Yankees in exchange for Tyler Austin and Luis Rijo. He was inserted into their bullpen as a long reliever, but was then moved to their starting rotation to replace the struggling Sonny Gray.

=== Texas Rangers (2019–2020) ===
On December 18, 2018, Lynn signed a three-year contract with the Texas Rangers for $30 million.

In 2019, Lynn posted a 16–11 record with a 3.67 ERA and 246 strikeouts over 208 1/3 innings. He led MLB in wild pitches, with 18. Lynn finished 5th in the 2019 AL Cy Young Award voting.

On August 9, 2020, Lynn earned his 100th MLB career win against the Los Angeles Angels. Lynn finished the year with a 6–3 record and a 3.32 ERA with 89 strikeouts in 84.0 innings of work.

=== Chicago White Sox (2021–2023) ===
On December 7, 2020, Lynn was traded to the Chicago White Sox in exchange for pitcher Dane Dunning and prospect Avery Weems. Lynn recorded a 9–3 record and 1.99 ERA through 16 starts to begin the 2021 season and was named an All-Star. On July 17, 2021, Lynn agreed to a two-year, $38 million contract extension with Chicago that includes a club option. On August 12, Lynn was the starting pitcher for the first Field of Dreams game in Dyersville, Iowa. Lynn went 5 innings, giving up 4 hits, 4 runs, and 2 walks while striking out 7 batters as the White Sox beat the Yankees 9–8. Overall in 2021, Lynn had 28 starts with an ERA of 2.69 and an 11–6 record. He pitched in 157 innings and struck out 176 batters. In the ALDS against the Houston Astros, Lynn started Game 1 but struggled. After a 1-2-3 first inning with 1 strike out, Lynn went 2.2 more innings giving up 5 runs while striking out only 3 more batters. Lynn finished 3rd in Cy Young Award voting behind Gerrit Cole and Robbie Ray.

Lynn started out the 2022 season on the Injured List after suffering a meniscus tear during spring training. Lynn was activated off the IL on June 13. Lynn made his first start on that same day against the Detroit Tigers. In that game after the 2nd inning, Lynn got into an argument in the dugout with White Sox third base coach Joe McEwing. The argument was after Lynn gave up his third earned run of the game. After his argument with McEwing, Lynn went the next 2.1 innings without giving up a run. In the game, Lynn went 4.1 innings giving up 10 hits and 3 earned runs while striking out 4 batters as the White Sox won 9–5. Overall in 2022, Lynn went 8–7 in 21 starts with an ERA of 3.99 in 121.2 innings while striking out 124 batters.

In a June 2023 game against the Seattle Mariners, Lynn struck out 16 batters in 7 innings, tying a White Sox team record for strikeouts in a regular season game. The performance also set an MLB mark for most strikeouts in a contest for a pitcher who had an ERA above 6.00 at the start of a game.

=== Los Angeles Dodgers (2023) ===
On July 28, 2023, Lynn and Joe Kelly were traded to the Los Angeles Dodgers in exchange for Trayce Thompson, Nick Nastrini, and Jordan Leasure. To finish the season with the Dodgers, Lynn made 11 starts with the team, complying to a 7–2 record with a 4.36 ERA. Overall, combined with both teams he played for in 2023, Lynn made 32 total starts with a 13–11 record, a 5.73 ERA, and an MLB-leading 44 home runs allowed. Following the season, the Dodgers declined the 2024 option on his contract, making him a free agent.

=== Return to the St. Louis Cardinals (2024) ===
On November 21, 2023, the Cardinals signed Lynn to a one-year contract. On July 30, 2024, Lynn defeated the Rangers, becoming the 23rd pitcher to earn a victory against all 30 MLB teams. In 23 starts for the Cardinals, he compiled a 7–4 record and 3.84 ERA with 109 strikeouts across 117 1/3 innings pitched. The Cardinals declined Lynn's option on October 31, making him a free agent.

On April 1, 2025, Lynn announced his retirement from professional baseball on a podcast.

== Awards ==
- Reference for this list

Major leagues

- All-Star (2012, 2021)
- World Series champion (2011)

Minor leagues

- Minor League Baseball (MiLB) Pacific Coast League Pitcher of the Postseason: 2010
- Cardinals organization Pitcher of the Month: May 2010
- 2x The Cardinal Nation (TCN)/Scout.com Cardinals Top Prospect (2010, #3; 2009 #18)
- Cardinals organization Pitcher of the Year: 2009
- TCN/Scout.com Springfield Starting Pitcher of the Year: 2009
- TCN/Scout.com System Starting Pitcher of the Year: 2009
- 2x Texas League All-Star (2009 mid-season and post-season)
- Scout.com Cards MiLB Player of the Month: May 2009
- Cardinals MiLB Player of the Month: May 2009

College

- Brooks Wallace Award Watch List by the Collegiate Baseball Foundation, 2008
- All-America by the National Collegiate Baseball Writer's Association, 2008
- NCAA Oxford Regional All-Tournament Team, 2007
- NCAA Oxford Regional Most Valuable Player, 2007

High school

- Gatorade Player of the Year for Indiana, 2005
- Louisville Slugger and EA All-America selection, 2005

== Pitching profile ==
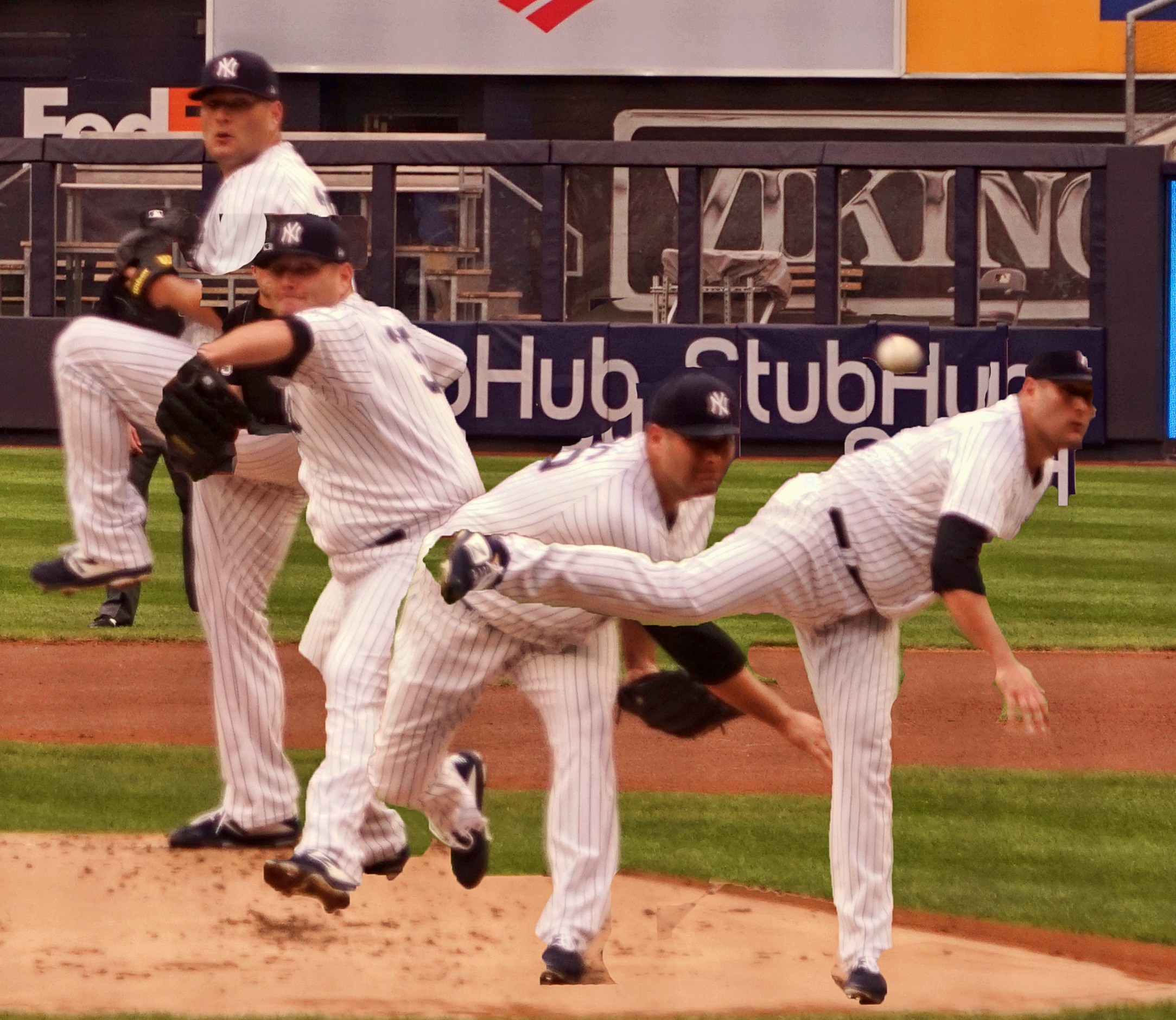
Lynn pitch

Lynn has four pitches in his arsenal: a four-seam fastball that typically travels between 93 miles per hour (150 km/h) (miles per hour) and 95 miles per hour (153 km/h), and tops out at 97 miles per hour (156 km/h); a two-seam fastball [92 miles per hour (148 km/h)–93]; a cut fastball [87 miles per hour (140 km/h)–88 miles per hour (142 km/h)]; and a curveball [79 miles per hour (127 km/h)–80 miles per hour (130 km/h)]. He uses his cutter mostly against right-handed hitters. Besides his four-seam fastball, his curve is his most commonly thrown pitch with two strikes. His four-seamer had one of the highest K/9 among fastballs thrown by relief pitchers in 2012. In 2012, Lynn finished third in the National League in 2012 in K/9, at 9.205. He finished ninth in 2013 with an 8.836 rate. His 33 wins between 2012 and 2013 led all NL starting pitchers over that span.

== Personal life ==
Lynn stands 6 feet 5 inches (1.96 m) tall and weighs 275 pounds (125 kg). In November 2010, he married Lauren (Grill) Lynn, who was a softball player at the University of Mississippi, but they have since divorced. They had one daughter together. In January 2020, Lynn married Dymin Hayes. They reside in Marion, Illinois.

Throughout his career, Lynn has battled weight problems which have affected his conditioning. The better shape he has been in, the longer he can go in workouts, and thus, the longer he can effectively pitch in single games and throughout the entire season. To improve his weight and conditioning, he conferred with fellow Cardinals starters Chris Carpenter, Wainwright and Jake Westbrook about their in-season and off-season preparations methods in the 2012–13 off-season. He obtained team strength and conditioning coach Pete Prinzi's help in formulating an offseason training regimen to address his lapses and stimulate weight loss. The Cardinals also sent team chef Lusky to spend a week with Lynn and his wife Lauren in their home, where he showed them better methods to select and prepare healthy food. Lynn also replaced favorites pizza and beer with more water and vodka.

In 2014, Lynn acknowledged how not handling his emotions during difficult innings affected his ability to limit damage from the opposition and finish off hitters with runners on base. He also has chafed at defensive gaffes and positional shifts with which he did not agree. He had trouble trusting his catchers to call pitches, especially Yadier Molina, who is highly regarded in his game-calling skills. However, teammates and Cardinals officials noticed that he became more receptive to changing his strategy, and therefore, outcomes.

Lynn grew up a New York Yankees fan.
