= Christian Garcia (baseball) =

American baseball player (born 1985)

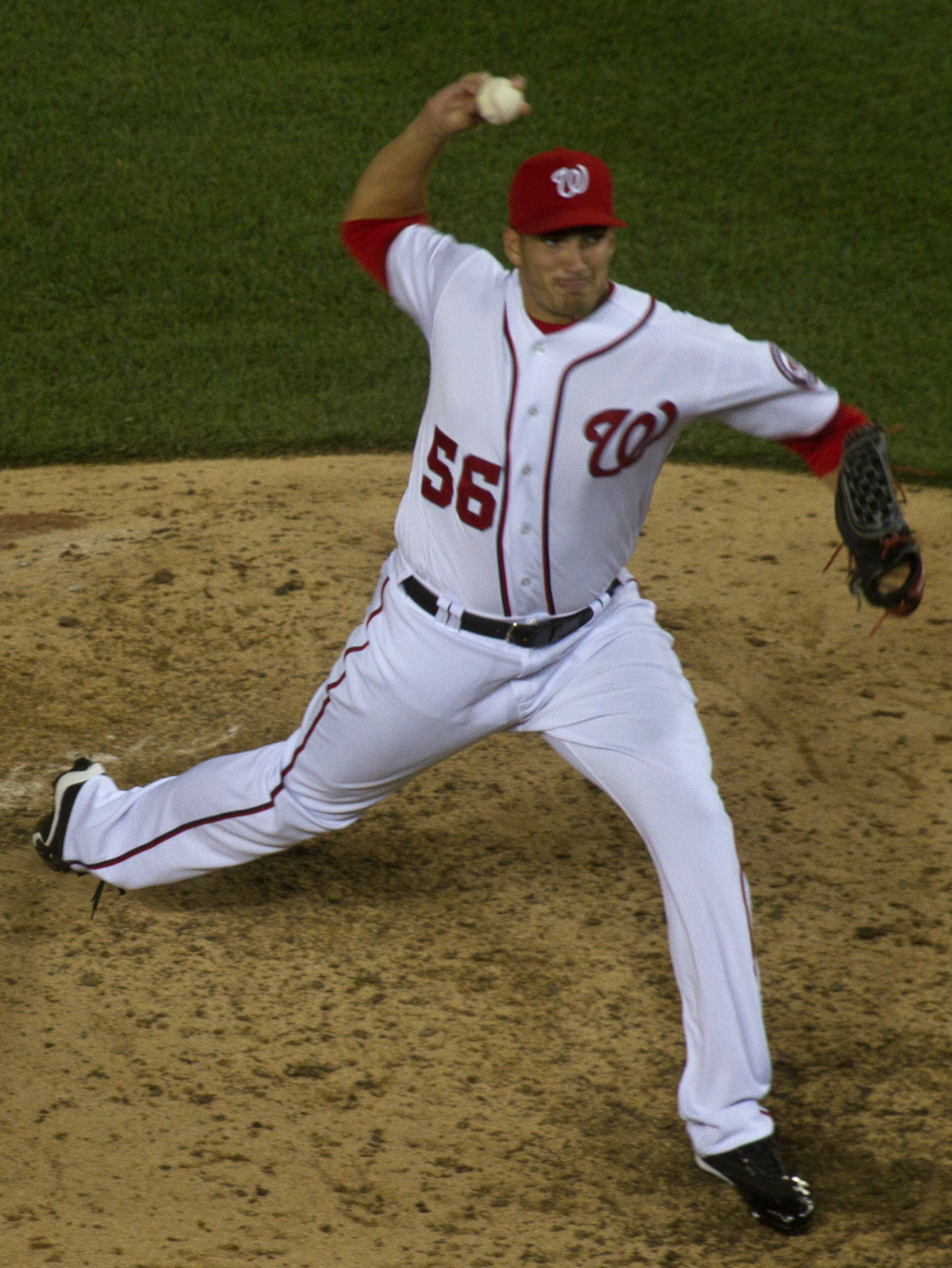
- Garcia with the Washington Nationals
- Pitcher
- Born: August 24, 1985 (age 41); Miami, Florida, U.S.
- Batted: Right Threw: Right

MLB debut
- September 4, 2012, for the Washington Nationals

Last appearance
- October 3, 2012, for the Washington Nationals

MLB statistics
- Win–loss record: 0–0
- Earned run average: 2.13
- Strikeouts: 15
- Stats at Baseball Reference

Teams
- Washington Nationals (2012)

Christian J. Garcia (born August 24, 1985) is an American former professional baseball pitcher. Garcia pitched for the Washington Nationals of Major League Baseball in 2012.

== Early life ==
Garcia attended Gulliver Preparatory School in Coral Gables, Florida. He played for the school's baseball team as a catcher and committed to attend the University of South Carolina on a baseball scholarship, intending to play for the South Carolina Gamecocks. He was a switch-hitting catcher as well as pitcher.

== Professional career ==
=== New York Yankees ===
The New York Yankees drafted Garcia in the third round, with the 99th overall selection, of the 2004 Major League Baseball draft, and he made his professional debut in the Rookie-level Gulf Coast League (GCL) with the GCL Yankees. One of the top prospects in the GCL in 2004, Garcia was promoted to the Charleston RiverDogs of the Single–A South Atlantic League in 2005. After returning to Charleston in 2006, the Yankees assigned him to the West Oahu CaneFires of the Arizona Fall League after the 2006 season.

Garcia experienced a torn ulnar collateral ligament (UCL) in his right elbow, which required Tommy John surgery in 2007. After missing the entire 2007 season, Garcia pitched to a 4–4 win–loss record and a 4.33 earned run average (ERA) with 74 strikeouts in 62 1/3 innings pitched between the GCL Yankees, Tampa Yankees of the High–A Florida State League, and Trenton Thunder of Double–A Eastern League in 2008.

On November 20, 2008, the Yankees added Garcia to their 40-man roster to protect him from the Rule 5 draft. Garcia experienced a recurrence of pain in his right elbow, which required his second elbow surgery, to repair a bone spur. His UCL tore again in 2010, which required his second Tommy John surgery in April 2010. The Yankees released him on May 14, 2010.

=== Washington Nationals ===
On August 1, 2011, Garcia signed a minor league contract with the Washington Nationals organization. In 2012, he allowed only five earned runs in 45 appearances, for a combined ERA of 0.86 for the Harrisburg Senators of the Eastern League and Syracuse Chiefs of the Triple–A International League. On September 3, 2012, Garcia was promoted to the major leagues for the first time. The following day, he made his major league debut, inducing a pop-up to end an inning. Nationals manager Davey Johnson said on September 24 that the team may attempt to convert Garcia into a starter for the 2013 season, citing his fully developed repertoire of pitches.

Garcia spent most of the 2013 season on the disabled list with a torn wrist tendon, shoulder and hamstring injuries, with minor league rehab assignments at Single–A Potomac, Double–A Harrisburg, and Triple–A Syracuse.

Garcia was released by the Nationals on June 25, 2014.

== Pitching style ==
Garcia threw four pitches: a four-seam and two-seam fastball averaging about 96 mph, a sweeping knuckle curveball in the low 80s, and a changeup averaging about 87 mph. Garcia said he was inspired to learn the spike curveball grip from watching Mike Mussina pitch.
