= Ryan Mattheus =

American baseball player (born 1983)

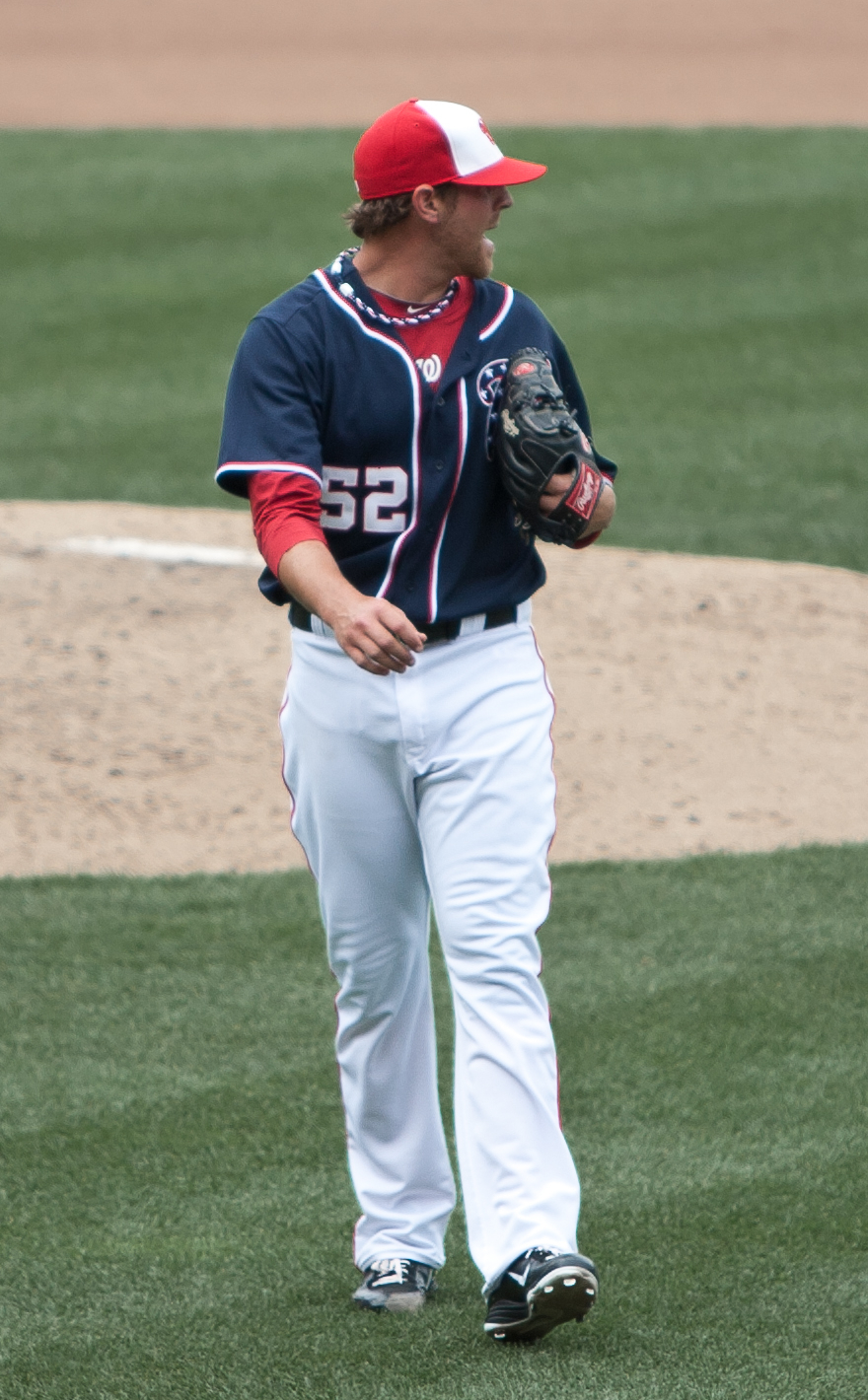
- Mattheus with the Washington Nationals
- Pitcher
- Born: November 10, 1983 (age 42); Galt, California, U.S.
- Batted: Right Threw: Right

MLB debut
- June 14, 2011, for the Washington Nationals

Last MLB appearance
- October 4, 2015, for the Cincinnati Reds

MLB statistics
- Win–loss record: 9–11
- Earned run average: 3.72
- Strikeouts: 116
- Stats at Baseball Reference

Teams
- Washington Nationals (2011–2014); Los Angeles Angels of Anaheim (2015); Cincinnati Reds (2015)

Ryan Arthur Mattheus (born November 10, 1983) is an American former professional baseball pitcher. He played in Major League Baseball (MLB) for the Washington Nationals, Los Angeles Angels of Anaheim, and Cincinnati Reds. He is a sinkerballer.

== Professional career ==
=== Colorado Rockies ===
Mattheus was selected by the Colorado Rockies in the 19th round of the 2003 Major League Baseball draft.

In 2004, he went 3–3, with a 4.94 ERA in 7 games, all for starts for Rookie-level Casper Ghosts in his pro debut. In 2005, he went 7–6, with a 5.82 ERA with 102 strikeouts against 52 walks in 23 games/starts for Asheville. He recorded a 4–5 record, with a 5.73 ERA in 12 home games and a 3–1 mark with 5.92 ERA in 11 road contests. He tossed a 2005 season-high 8 1/3 innings in his last outing of the season on September 5 at Hickory in a 5–1 win. In 2006, he ranked 3rd among the California League Leaders in innings pitched. Mattheus was among the club leaders, ranked first in starts with 28, innings with 156 and losses with 12. He was second in wins with 7, and third in strikeouts with 131. He tossed 9 quality starts, allowed 3 runs or less in 15 outings and threw six or more innings in 13 contests. He pitched a complete-game shutout on May 28 against the San Jose Giants, retiring 23 of 32 batters faced in the Nuts' 4–0 victory. He struck out season-high 10 batters on August 17 vs. Stockton.

Mattheus went 9–11 with a 5.56 ERA in 26 games/starts in his first season at the Double-A level in 2007. He led the Texas League in runs with 100 and earned runs with 98. Also, 12 of his 26 outings were quality starts. He tossed seven or more innings on 10 occasions and registered a season-best 10 strikeouts over seven innings on August 8 against the Frisco RoughRiders. Mattheus was a Texas League All-Star in 2007, an all-star for the first time in his career. He repeated as a Texas League All-Star in 2008. That same year, he also appeared in the 2008 All-Star Futures Game at Yankee Stadium.

Mattheus bounced around the Rockies' organization in 2009, playing for Modesto again, Tulsa again, and finally made his first appearance at the Triple-A level with the Colorado Springs Sky Sox.

=== Washington Nationals ===
On July 31, 2009, Mattheus was traded with Robinson Fabian for major league relief pitcher Joe Beimel.

Mattheus was called up by the Nationals on June 10, 2011.

In 2012, Mattheus appeared in a career high 66 games. Mattheus was on the postseason roster for the 2012 Nationals in the National League Division Series. He appeared in three games and pitched three scoreless innings. Notably, he entered Game 1 in the 7th inning with the bases loaded and nobody out, with the Nationals behind one run. He retired the next two batters, and got all three outs on just two pitches without allowing a run (by getting a groundout and then a ground-ball double play), a first in postseason history. The Nationals would go on to win the game, 3–2.

In 2013, following an outing in which he allowed five runs to the San Diego Padres, Mattheus slammed his right hand into a locker, fracturing his hand and sending him to the disabled list.

Mattheus was outrighted off the Nationals roster on November 20, 2014.

=== Los Angeles Angels of Anaheim ===
On January 14, 2015, Mattheus signed a minor league contract with the Los Angeles Angels of Anaheim. Mattheus started the season on the Opening Day roster for the Salt Lake City Bees, the Angels' Triple–A affiliate, and was called up to the majors on May 8. In his only appearance for the Angels, he tossed a scoreless inning of relief against the Houston Astros. Mattheus was designated for assignment following the promotion of Marc Krauss on May 12.

=== Cincinnati Reds ===
On May 13, 2015, Mattheus was claimed off waivers by the Cincinnati Reds. On August 31, at Wrigley Field in Chicago, Mattheus was the winning pitcher in a 13–6 Cincinnati rout of the Chicago Cubs despite having thrown only one pitch, which was hit for an RBI single. With the Cubs leading 4–3 in the bottom of the fifth inning, Mattheus relieved starter Michael Lorenzen, who had left runners on first and second with two outs. Kris Bryant hit Mattheus' only pitch for an RBI single, but after the run, which made the score 5–3 in the Cubs' favor, Anthony Rizzo was thrown out trying to take third. Mattheus did not pitch again, but the Reds scored four runs in the top of the sixth to give him the victory. In 57 appearances for the Reds, he compiled a 2–4 record and 4.09 ERA with 35 strikeouts over 55 innings pitched. On December 2, Mattheus was non–tendered by Cincinnati and became a free agent.

On January 9, 2016, Mattheus re–signed with the Reds organization on a minor league contract. He was released by Cincinnati on April 24.

=== Sugar Land Skeeters ===
Mattheus signed with the Sugar Land Skeeters of the Atlantic League and posted a 3.00 ERA in 38 relief appearances. He became a free agent after the 2016 season.

== Pitching style ==
Mattheus has four pitches in his repertoire: a sinker and four-seam fastball averaging about 94 mph, and a slider and splitter with good sinking action in the mid 80s. He tends to throw more four-seamers and sliders to right-handed hitters, while relying more heavily on the strong tailing movement of his sinker and splitter against left-handed hitters.

== Personal life ==
Mattheus went to Galt High School which is located in Galt, California.
