= Jordan Zimmermann =

American baseball pitcher (born 1986)

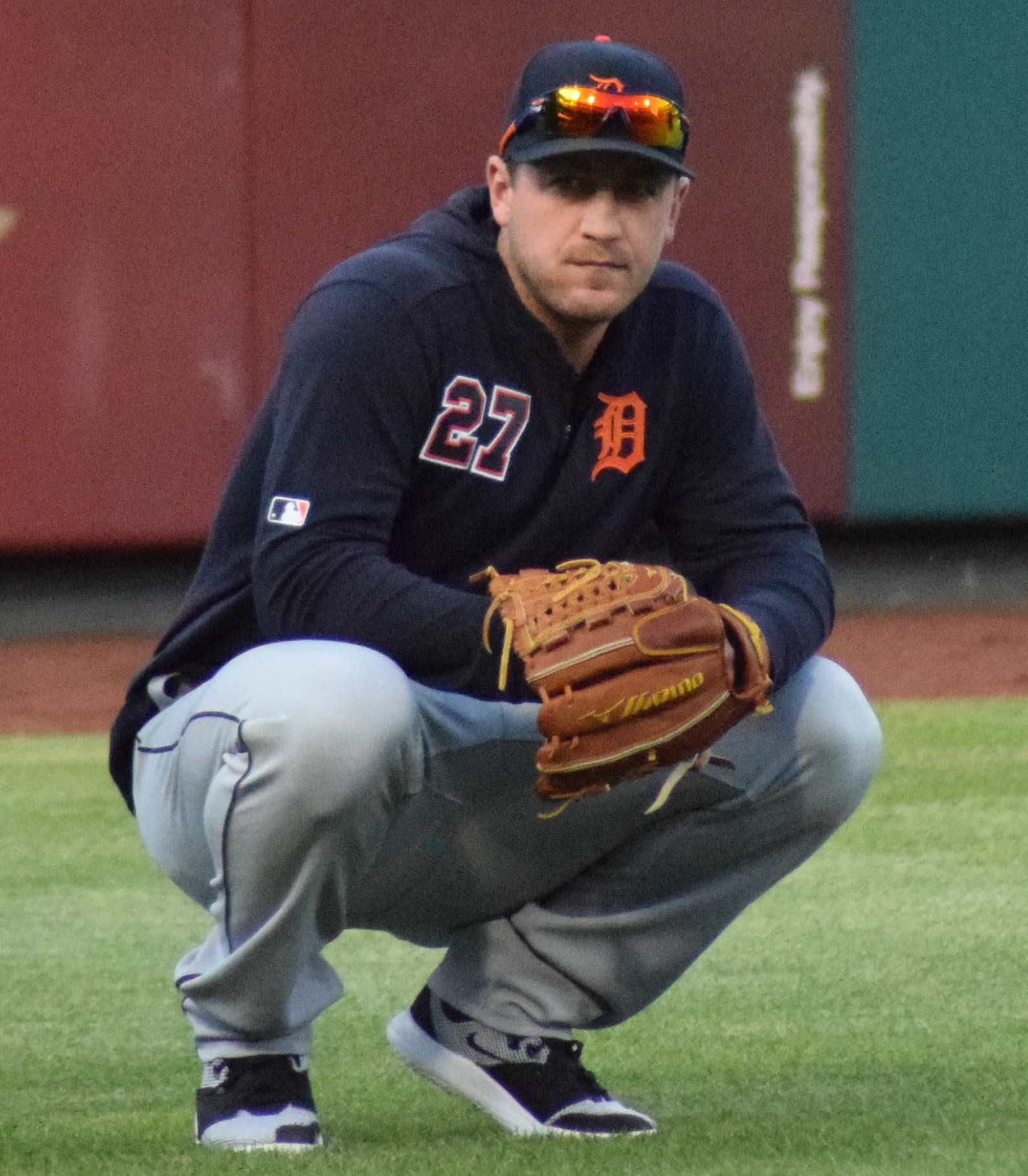
- Zimmermann with the Detroit Tigers in 2019
- Pitcher
- Born: May 23, 1986 (age 40); Auburndale, Wisconsin, U.S.
- Batted: Right Threw: Right

MLB debut
- April 20, 2009, for the Washington Nationals

Last MLB appearance
- May 7, 2021, for the Milwaukee Brewers

MLB statistics
- Win–loss record: 95–91
- Earned run average: 4.07
- Strikeouts: 1,271
- Stats at Baseball Reference

Teams
- Washington Nationals (2009–2015); Detroit Tigers (2016–2020); Milwaukee Brewers (2021)

Career highlights and awards
- 2× All-Star (2013, 2014); NL wins leader (2013); Pitched a no-hitter on September 28, 2014

Jordan Michael Zimmermann (born May 23, 1986) is an American former professional baseball pitcher. He played in Major League Baseball (MLB) for the Washington Nationals, Detroit Tigers, and Milwaukee Brewers. Zimmermann was a two-time MLB All-Star, and co-led the National League in wins in 2013. In 2014, Zimmermann pitched the first no-hitter in Washington Nationals history.

== Career ==
Zimmermann was born in Auburndale, Wisconsin, where he played all four years of high school on the varsity team at Auburndale High School. He began his career as a catcher, then moved to multiple positions due to his versatility. He was used as a starting pitcher as well as a closer in tight games. Zimmermann attended the University of Wisconsin-Stevens Point and played summer league baseball for the Eau Claire Express of the Northwoods League.

He was drafted by the Washington Nationals in the second round of the 2007 Major League Baseball draft as a compensation pick from the Chicago Cubs for the signing of Alfonso Soriano.

In 2008, Zimmermann had a combined 10–3 record with a 2.89 earned run average (ERA) with the Potomac Nationals of the Class A-Advanced Carolina League and the Harrisburg Senators of the Class AA Eastern League, and in July was named to the Eastern League All-Star team. He finished the season leading the organization in wins, strikeouts, and earned run average, and was the MILB.com Nationals pitcher of the year.

=== Washington Nationals ===
==== 2009 ====
Zimmermann was rated the Nationals' best prospect going into the 2009 season, according to Baseball America. In 2009, Zimmermann made the Nationals' roster as the fifth starter; however, the Nationals did not need him in the rotation until mid-April, so Zimmermann opened the season with the Triple-A Syracuse Chiefs. Zimmermann's contract was purchased on April 20, 2009, and he made his major league debut that night, after a two-plus hour rain delay, against the Atlanta Braves. He pitched six innings, allowing two runs on six hits, with three strikeouts and a walk, earning the victory.

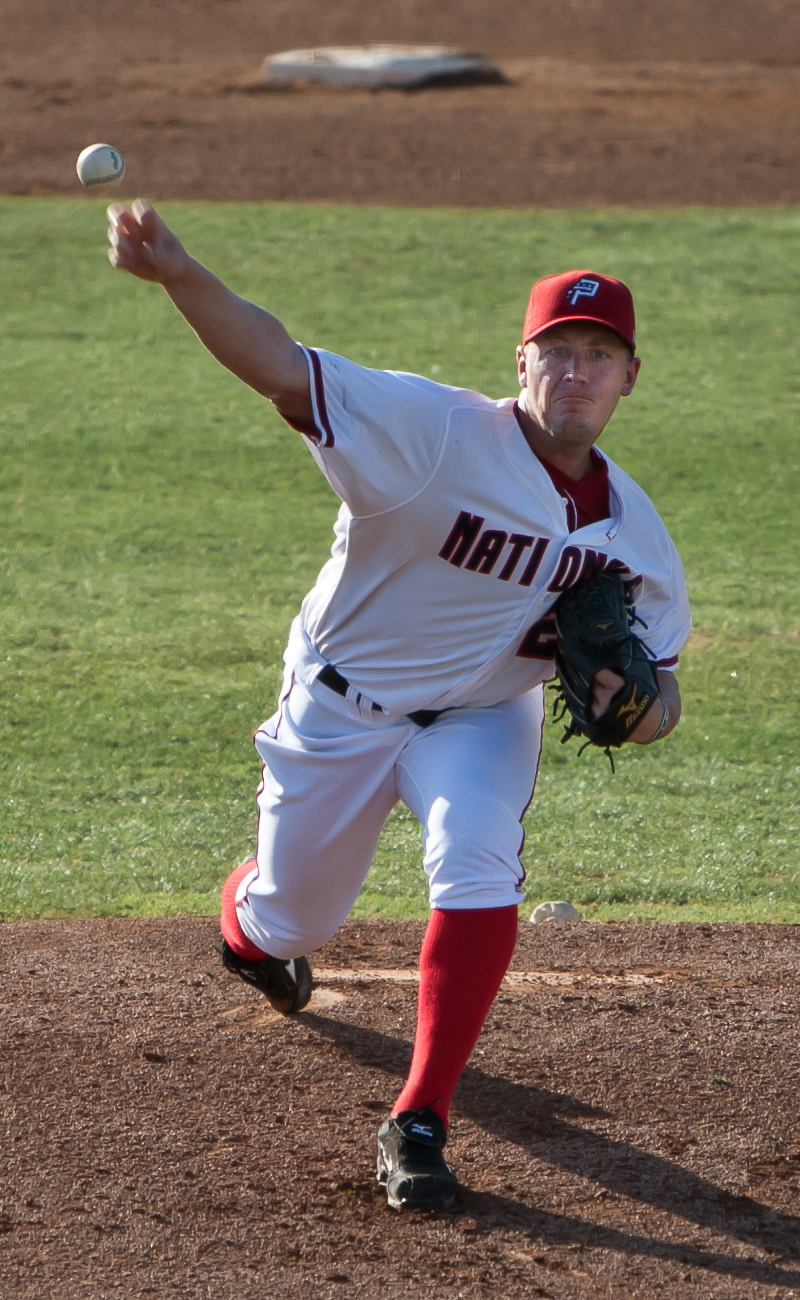
Zimmermann with the Potomac Nationals in July 2010

In his second game against the New York Mets, Zimmermann won his second game in as many starts, becoming the first Nationals/Expos pitcher to win his first two starts of his career since Randy Johnson did so in 1988. Coincidentally, Zimmermann was the losing pitcher in Johnson's historic 300th win on June 4, 2009.

Zimmermann experienced elbow pain, and in July landed on the disabled list. After attempted rehab, in August 2009 Zimmermann was diagnosed with a torn ulnar collateral ligament and underwent Tommy John surgery, expecting to miss 18 months. He finished his rookie season of 2009 going 3–5 with a 4.63 ERA in 16 starts.

==== 2010 ====
In 2010, he made quick progress. Over four minor league levels, he started 10 games in limited play, racking up just 39 2/3 innings, but compiling a solid record: 1.59 ERA, 27 hits allowed, 31 strikeouts, and just six walks. On August 26, he was recalled to make his 2010 debut back in the big leagues, where Zimmermann got a no-decision in an eventual win by the Nationals over the Cardinals. On this same day, the Nationals learned that their other young pitching phenom, Stephen Strasburg, would need Tommy John surgery and would be out for 12–18 months. In Zimmermann's second return start, however, five days later, he pitched six shutout innings, allowing only one hit, no walks, and striking out nine, a personal best. He also became the first National to get through six innings facing only 18 batters. Zimmermann finished the 2010 year 1–2 with a 4.94 ERA in seven starts.

==== 2011 ====
On May 6, 2011, Zimmermann pitched an immaculate inning versus the Florida Marlins at Sun Life Stadium. He finished the 2011 year 8–11 with a 3.18 ERA.

==== 2012 ====
On May 28, 2012, Zimmermann hit his first career home run off of Miami Marlins pitcher Carlos Zambrano. Zimmermann became the third Nationals pitcher named NL Pitcher of the Month during the 2012 season when the selection was announced on August 2. During July, he went 4–0 with an MLB-best 0.97 ERA. He gave up 27 hits in 37 innings and struck out 31 compared to 4 walks. He finished the 2012 season 12–8 with a 2.94 ERA.

In Game 4 of the National League Division Series, Zimmermann made a relief appearance in the 7th inning, his first since 2008 at A-level Potomac. Entering a tie game, Zimmermann struck out the side. The Nationals would eventually lose the series to the St. Louis Cardinals after Game 5.

==== 2013 ====
Zimmermann hurled his first career shutout on April 26, 2013, with a one-hitter against the Cincinnati Reds. It was the second straight one-hitter by Nationals pitching in the series, marking the first occasion since 1917 that a Washington team achieved that streak, and the first time since 1900 that the Reds were victimized that way.

In 2013, Zimmermann was named to his first All-Star Game, but chose not to play due to stiffness in his neck. He finished the season with a career high in wins, going 19–9, while also posting a 3.25 ERA and 161 strikeouts in a career-high 213 1/3 innings over 32 starts. His wins total tied with Adam Wainwright for the National League lead.

==== 2014 ====
Zimmermann made his second and final All-Star Game selection in 2014, though he did not appear in the game. On September 28, the last day of the regular season, Zimmermann threw the first no-hitter in Nationals history, a 1–0 win over the Miami Marlins and Henderson Álvarez, the pitcher who threw the final no-hitter of the 2013 season. Zimmermann faced only one over the minimum in the game; only a fifth inning walk to Justin Bour and a seventh inning third strike wild pitch that allowed Garrett Jones (who was subsequently picked off) to reach first base separated him from a perfect game. This was also the first time in MLB history that a no-hitter had been thrown on the final day in two consecutive seasons. Zimmermann finished the season with a 14–5 record and a 2.66 ERA, striking out a career-high 182 batters in 199 2/3 innings.

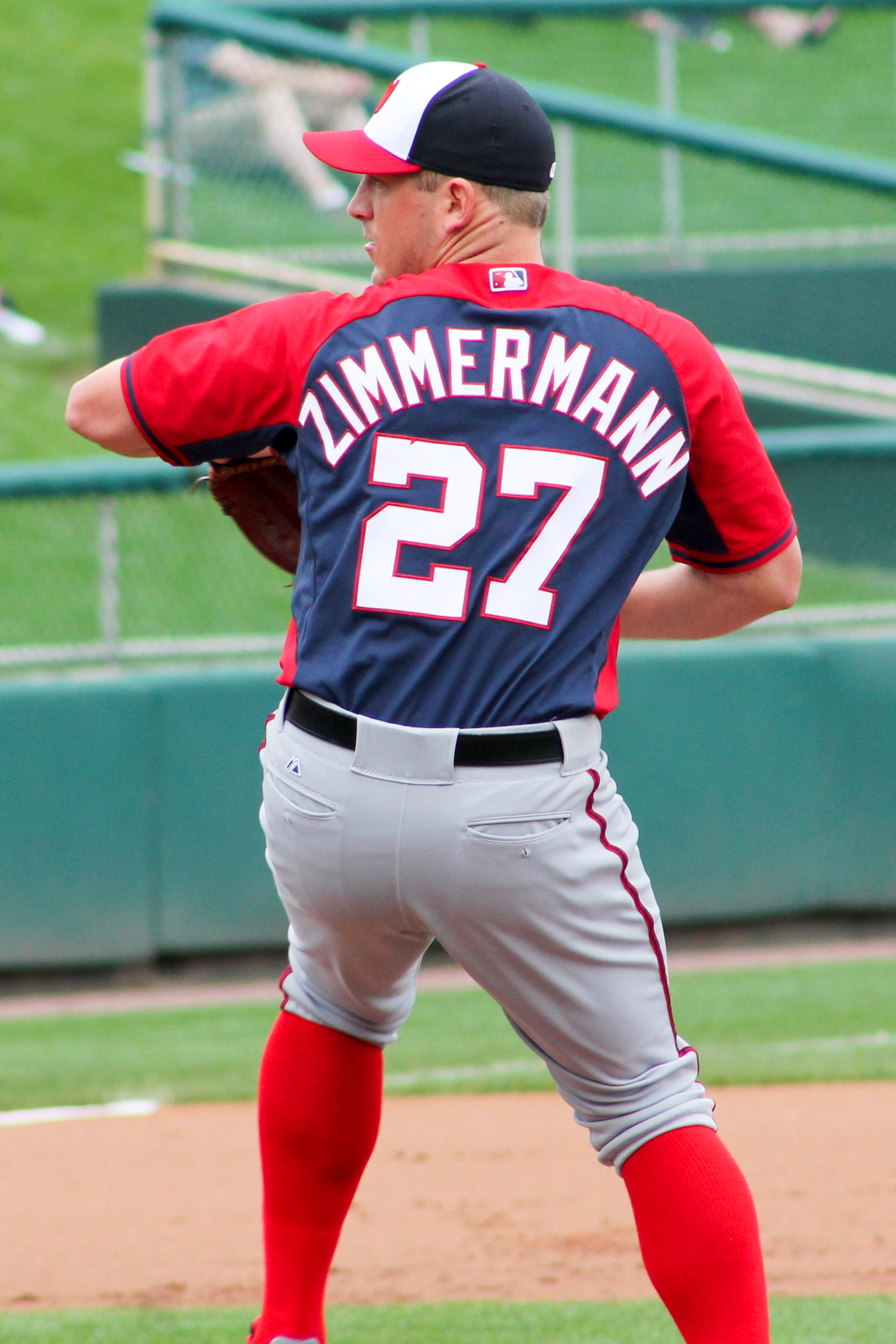
Zimmermann in March 2015

==== 2015 ====
Zimmermann finished the 2015 season with a 13–10 record, of 3.66 ERA, 1.205 WHIP, and 164 strikeouts in 201 2/3 innings pitched. Following the season, he became one of a record 20 players to receive a qualifying offer. Zimmermann finished his tenure with the Nationals starting 178 games, sporting a 70–50 record, a 3.32 ERA, pitching 1,094 innings, eight complete games (four shutouts) and striking out 903 batters.

=== Detroit Tigers ===
==== 2016 ====
On November 30, 2015, the Detroit Tigers signed Zimmermann to a five-year, $110 million contract.

Zimmermann was named the American League Pitcher of the Month for April. During the month of April, he allowed two earned runs in 33 innings pitched, for a 0.55 ERA. He was 5–0, becoming the sixth pitcher to finish April with at least 5 wins, zero losses and a sub-1.00 ERA. He joins Fernando Valenzuela (1981), Randy Johnson (2000), Cliff Lee (2008), Zack Greinke (2009), and Ubaldo Jiménez (2010). Zimmermann's 0.55 ERA is the third-best mark for April in Tigers history, higher than only Bernie Boland with a 0.30 ERA in 1915 and John Hiller with a 0.36 ERA in 1974. On July 4, Zimmermann was placed on the 15-day disabled list due to a neck strain.

==== 2017 ====
On May 23, Zimmermann recorded his 1,000th career strikeout in a game against the Houston Astros. On July 17, in a game against the Kansas City Royals, he threw 79 strikes out of 97 pitches, an 81 percent strike rate that ranks as the best by a Tigers starter with 80 pitches or more since at least 1988, and was the best by a Major League starter since 2008. Overall, Zimmermann struggled throughout the 2017 season. In 29 starts, he went 8–13 with a 6.08 ERA and 1.55 WHIP.

==== 2018 ====
On April 11, Zimmermann was struck in the face by a line drive by Jason Kipnis. Zimmermann was taken to the hospital, and was diagnosed with a bruised jaw, but made his next start. On May 6, after making seven starts in the 2018 season, he was placed on the 10-day disabled list with a right shoulder strain. He returned to the rotation on June 16. For the 2018 season, Zimmermann made 25 starts, compiling a 7–8 record with a 4.52 ERA and 111 strikeouts in 131 1/3 innings pitched.

==== 2019 ====
Zimmermann began the 2019 season as the Tigers Opening Day starter. He was placed on the disabled list on April 26 due to a UCL sprain. He returned to MLB action on June 19, starting and pitching four innings against the Pittsburgh Pirates. Zimmermann finished the 2019 season with a 6.91 ERA and a dismal 1–13 record, becoming the first Tiger pitcher since at least 1908 to post fewer than two wins in a season with at least 20 starts.

==== 2020 ====
Zimmermann began the 2020 season on the 45/60 day injured list due to a right forearm strain. He appeared in three games, compiling a 0–0 record with 7.94 ERA and six strikeouts in 5 2/3 innings pitched. He became a free agent following the season.

=== Milwaukee Brewers ===
On February 18, 2021, Zimmermann signed a minor league contract with the Milwaukee Brewers organization that included an invitation to spring training. On March 26, Zimmermann was released by the Brewers. The next day, Zimmermann re-signed with the Brewers on a new minor league contract. On April 29, Zimmermann was selected to the active roster He recorded a 7.94 ERA in 2 games for the Brewers.

On May 11, 2021, Zimmermann announced his retirement from professional baseball.

== Pitching style ==
Zimmermann was mainly a three-pitch pitcher. He threw a four-seam fastball at 92 miles per hour (148 km/h) that topped out at 95 miles per hour (153 km/h), a slider which he described as a "baby cutter" (86.6 miles per hour (139.4 km/h)), and a curveball (79.3 miles per hour (127.6 km/h)). On rare occasions, he also featured a circle change to left-handed hitters. Later in his career, he added a sinker (91.6 miles per hour (147.4 km/h))

Achievements
| Preceded by Cole Hamels, Jake Diekman, Ken Giles, Jonathan Papelbon | No-hitter pitcher September 28, 2014 | Succeeded by Chris Heston |
