= Jordan Zimmerman =

Canadian baseball player (born 1975)

- Pitcher
- Born: April 28, 1975 (age 51); Kelowna, British Columbia, Canada
- Batted: Right Threw: Left

MLB debut
- May 17, 1999, for the Seattle Mariners

Last MLB appearance
- July 7, 1999, for the Seattle Mariners

MLB statistics
- Win–loss record: 0–0
- Earned run average: 7.88
- Strikeouts: 3
- Stats at Baseball Reference

Teams
- Seattle Mariners (1999)

Jordan William Zimmerman (born April 28, 1975) is a Canadian former professional baseball pitcher. He played part of one season in Major League Baseball (MLB) for the Seattle Mariners in 1999.

Zimmerman was first drafted by the Los Angeles Dodgers in the 32nd round of the 1993 MLB draft out of Brenham High School in Brenham, Texas. After a year of college baseball at Blinn College in Brenham. He then re-entered the draft in 1994 and was picked again in the 32nd round, this time by Seattle. He also pitched for the Canada national under-18 baseball team.

Zimmerman signed with the Mariners in May 1995 and made his professional debut in 1997 after dealing with a back injury. Zimmerman appeared in 12 MLB games in 1999. In his final game on July 2, competing against his older brother Jeff Zimmerman, he allowed a walk-off hit to Rusty Greer of the Texas Rangers. Zimmerman ended his MLB career with no decisions. He had a 7.88 earned run average in 8 innings pitched.

Zimmerman dealt with more injuries in 2000 and pitched his final season in Triple-A in 2001. He pitched for the Long Island Ducks of the Atlantic League of Professional Baseball in 2004.

After his playing career ended, Zimmerman worked in real estate sales in Arizona.
