= 2012 Atlanta Braves season =

2012 Atlanta Braves
- National League Wild Card winners
- League: National League
- Division: East
- Ballpark: Turner Field
- City: Atlanta, Georgia
- Record: 94–68 (.580)
- Divisional place: 2nd
- Owners: Liberty Media
- General managers: Frank Wren
- Managers: Fredi González
- Television: SportSouth; Fox Sports South; Peachtree TV (Chip Caray, Joe Simpson, Tom Glavine, Dale Murphy)
- Radio: WCNN; WNNX; Atlanta Braves Radio Network (Jim Powell, Don Sutton, Mark Lemke)

The 2012 Atlanta Braves season was the Braves' 16th season of home games at Turner Field, 47th season in Atlanta, and 142nd season overall. After a late season collapse in 2011 kept the Braves from the playoffs, the team returned to the postseason for the second time in three seasons as a Wild Card team, with a record of 94–68. They lost to the St. Louis Cardinals in the NLWC Game.

== Offseason ==
=== Areas of interest ===
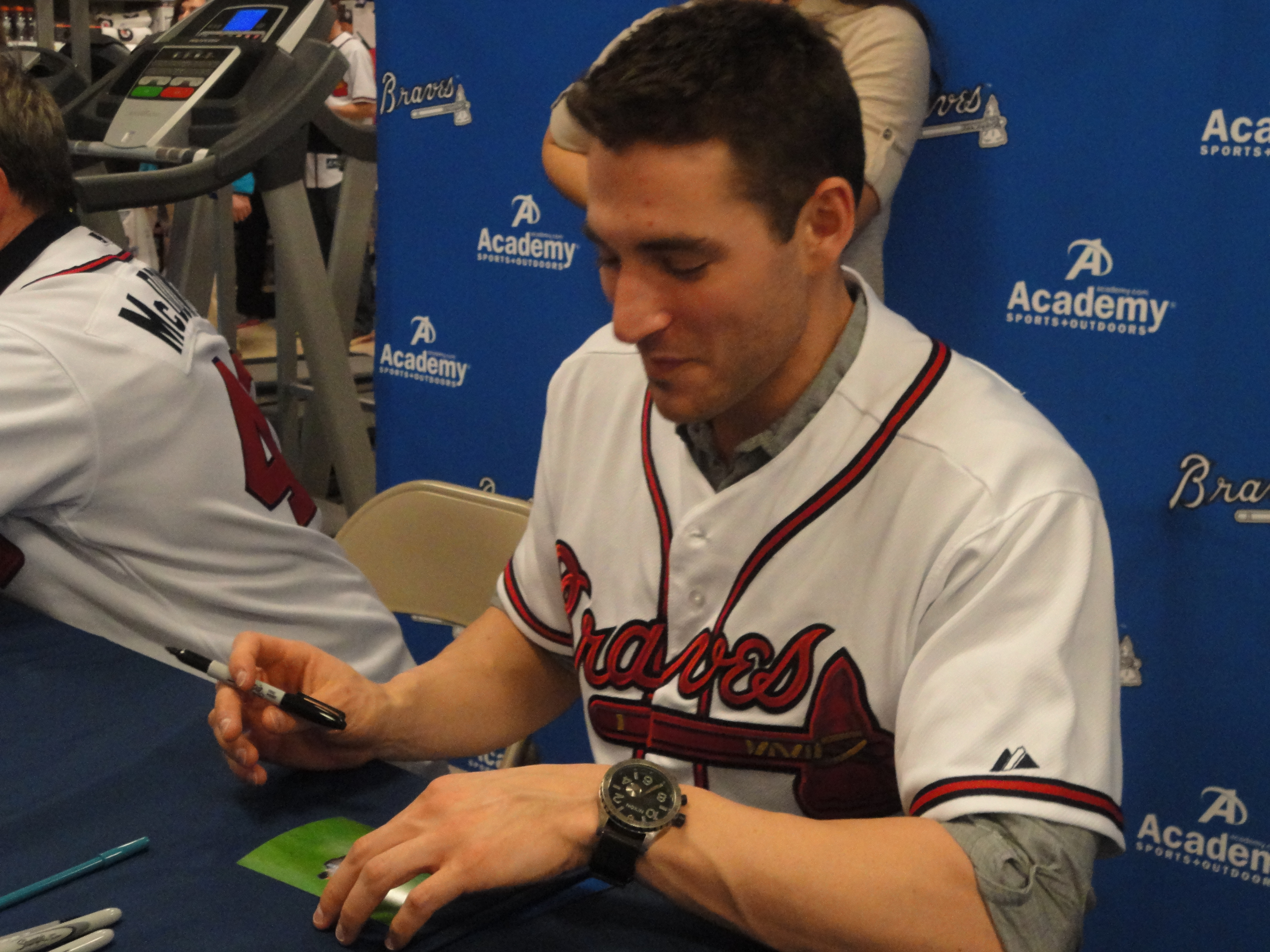
Starting pitcher Brandon Beachy signing autographs at a 2012 Braves Country Caravan appearance.

Following the conclusion of the 2011 season, Braves general manager Frank Wren highlighted several important areas to improve during the offseason. Since most players were committed contractually to the team in 2012, Wren acknowledged that he would likely make few major changes. One spot that was mentioned for a major overhaul was the shortstop position, where Alex González had played since the Yunel Escobar trade with Toronto in July 2010. González entered the offseason as a free agent and proved too expensive for the team. Wren ultimately allowed prospect Tyler Pastornicky the starting duties in 2012, until he was replaced by Andrelton Simmons in mid-June. When Simmons was hurt in July, Jack Wilson, Paul Janish, and Martín Prado filled in for him. While center fielder Michael Bourn returned to his position in 2012, Wren also suggested that the corner outfield positions were areas of contention. In 2011, the Atlanta outfielders finished the season last in the National League in on-base plus slugging and slugging percentage. Wren stated that right fielder Jason Heyward and left fielder Martín Prado had no guarantee of getting the starting jobs in 2012. On the day after the Braves were eliminated from the playoffs in 2011, Wren said that veteran starter Derek Lowe was unlikely to have a spot in the starting rotation in 2012, due his poor performance in 2011 and a plethora of rookie pitching talent in the Braves farm system. With Lowe guaranteed $15 million in 2012, Wren projected that any of Lowe's salary picked up by another team would significantly assist his efforts to find a shortstop or outfielder. By the end of October, Lowe was traded to the Indians.

=== Country Caravan ===
The Braves organization announced the third annual "Braves Country Caravan" on December 19, 2011. Players, coaches, and personalities of the Braves organization who participate in the Caravan will travel to twenty cities throughout the southeast United States, including ones in Georgia, Alabama, South Carolina, North Carolina, and Tennessee, from January 27 to February 9, 2012. In previous years a select few players and personnel have traveled to one venue to meet fans and sign autographs while others travel to another location. Braves president John Schuerholtz praised the Caravan as an excellent opportunity for the organization to personally thank fans for their support and to reach out to local communities. Noting that the Caravan would make over forty stops and travel over three thousand miles, the organization revealed specific venues and participating members with a press release on January 19, 2012.

=== New alternate uniforms ===
The Braves held a ceremony on February 6 unveiling new home alternate uniforms to be worn in 2012 with Chipper Jones, Dan Uggla, and Brian McCann modeling the new uniform and Hank Aaron present to help introduce it. The new jersey is a cream color, instead of white, and has a retro look reminiscent of the uniforms from the days in Milwaukee and first two years in Atlanta with the uniform number on the front of the jersey instead of a tomahawk. The sleeve of the uniform will have a logo with two tomahawks crossing with "1876" (representing the organization's first year in the National League) above it and "Atlanta Braves" below the crossing tomahawks. The Braves also announced that the team will wear the new uniforms for all Saturday and Sunday home games. The red jerseys previously worn since 2005 for Sunday home games will now be worn for Friday home games.

=== Offseason additions and subtractions ===
	Subtractions	Additions
**Players**	**RHS** Derek Lowe (traded to Indians); **LHR** George Sherrill (signed with Mariners); **RHR** Scott Linebrink (signed with Cardinals); **RHP** Kenshin Kawakami* (signed with Chunichi Dragons of Japan); **RHR** Jairo Asencio (traded to Indians); **SS** Alex González (signed with Brewers); **SS** Diory Hernández (signed with Astros); **INF** Brooks Conrad (signed with Brewers); **INF** Julio Lugo† (signed with Indians); **SS** Brandon Hicks (claimed off waivers by A's); **OF** Nate McLouth (signed with Pirates); **OF** Wilkin Ramírez (signed with Twins); **OF** Antoan Richardson (signed with Orioles); **OF** Matt Young (signed with Tigers)	**RHP** Liván Hernández (signed as free agent); **RHR** Chad Durbin (signed as a free agent); **3B** Juan Francisco (acquired in trade from Reds); **LHR** Robert Fish (Rule 5 draft pick from Angels); **LHR** Dusty Hughes** (Minor League free agent); **RHP** Adam Russell** (Minor League free agent); **INF** Drew Sutton** (Minor League free agent); **INF** Josh Wilson** (Minor League free agent); **OF** Luis Durango** (Minor League free agent); **OF** Jordan Parraz** (Minor League free agent)
**Personnel**	**Hitting coach** Larry Parrish (terminated)	**Hitting coach** Greg Walker; **Asst. hitting coach** Scott Fletcher

†Player released during 2011 season
*Player spent entire 2011 season in Minor Leagues
**Player was non-roster invitee to Spring training (not on 40-man roster)

=== Timeline ===
Names highlighted in bold appear on the table above.

==== September 2011 ====
September 29: On the day following the historic elimination of the 2011 Atlanta Braves from playoff contention, Frank Wren announced that manager Fredi González and the entire coaching staff from 2011 would return to their respective roles in 2012. The following day, however, after having a meeting with hitting coach Larry Parrish, Wren announced that Parrish would not return to the coaching staff in 2012. He stated that he would spend this offseason seeking a successor to Parrish. With Parrish's departure, the Braves will now have a third hitting coach in three seasons after removing Terry Pendleton from the role after the 2010 season.

==== October 2011 ====
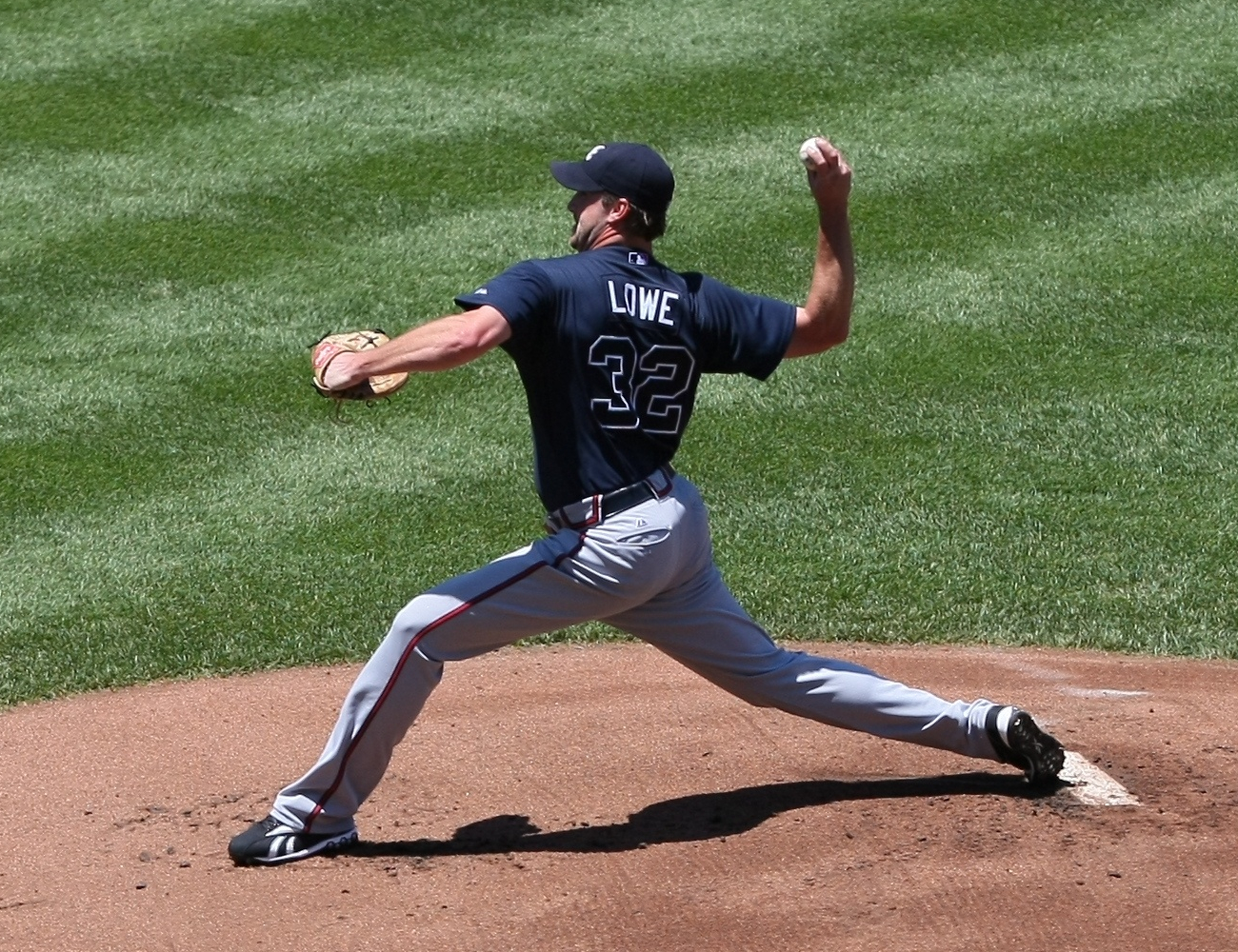
Before being traded to the Indians, Derek Lowe went 40–39 with a 4.57 ERA in 101 starts for Atlanta.

October 21: Three weeks after firing Larry Parrish from his hitting coach duties, the Braves announced that Parrish would be succeeded in 2012 by Greg Walker, the former hitting coach for the Chicago White Sox from 2003 to 2011. Walker had stepped down as the White Sox hitting coach immediately following the end of the 2011 season. In the nine seasons Walker served as hitting coach, the White Sox offense ranked third in the Majors in home runs and seventh in slugging percentage. On the other hand, in 2011 the White Sox offense only ranked eleventh in the American League in runs, eighth in average, and seventh in on-base percentage. In an accompanying move, the Braves hired Scott Fletcher to assist Walker in his duties and to serve as an on-site advance scout.

October 31: Three days following the conclusion of the 2011 World Series, the Braves began to make some organizational roster moves. In the first trade of the offseason in the Major Leagues, the Braves traded struggling starting pitcher Derek Lowe to the Cleveland Indians in return for High-A lefty reliever Chris Jones. In addition, the Indians agreed to pay $5 million of Lowe's guaranteed $15 million salary in 2012. Lowe served as the Atlanta Braves' Opening Day starter in 2009, 2010, and 2011. Due to his struggles in 2011, however, Lowe likely would have merely served in a middle relief role for the bullpen in 2012. On the same day, the Braves announced that they had declined the $10.65 million option for center fielder Nate McLouth, ending his lackluster tenure as an Atlanta Brave. McLouth later signed a one-year contract to return to the Pittsburgh Pirates on December 7. Additionally, the Braves decided to exercise the $1.5 million option for utility man Eric Hinske, assuring his return for the 2012 season.

==== November 2011 ====
November 2: The Braves announced several internal roster moves that allowed for additional space on the forty-man roster. After spending the month of September 2011 with the Major League club, the team outrighted catcher J. C. Boscán, right-handed pitcher Stephen Marek, and outfielders Antoan Richardson and Wilkin Ramírez to the triple-A affiliate Gwinnett Braves. In addition, the Braves filled one roster spot with starting pitcher Todd Redmond, who has spent the previous three seasons pitching for Gwinnett. Accumulating a record of 10–8 with a 2.92 ERA in 2011, Redmond is unlikely to have playing time with the Major League club due to existing pitching depth.

November 3: With the beginning of free agency season, the Braves were able to remove offseason free agents from the forty-man roster. The free agents for this offseason include shortstop Alex González, infielder Jack Wilson, and veteran relievers Scott Linebrink and George Sherrill. In conjunction with the moves made on November 2, Frank Wren and his staff now have seven roster spots that will be filled with potential offseason acquisitions or prospects they wish to protect from the Rule 5 draft.

November 23: After becoming a free agent following the conclusion to the 2011 season, the Braves decided to decline arbitration to shortstop Álex González. If the team had accepted his arbitration they would have received a compensatory draft pick between the first and second rounds of the 2012 MLB draft if González signed with another team. The move made it very clear that González would not return as the starting shortstop in 2012. González looked to receive a multi-year contract on the free agent market, something the Braves were not willing to offer due to rising prospects such as Tyler Pastornicky and Andrelton Simmons. On December 8, González signed a contract with the Milwaukee Brewers for one year and a vesting option for the 2013 season.

==== December 2011 ====
December 8: As a part of the Rule 5 draft at the 2012 Winter Meetings, the Braves selected left-handed relief pitcher Robert Fish from the Los Angeles Angels of Anaheim in the Major League Phase. Under draft rules, Fish must be kept on the Braves 25-man Major League roster for the entire 2012 season. If waived, Fish must first be offered back to the Angels. Left-handed relief pitcher George Sherrill departs the club as a free agent, later signing with the Seattle Mariners on December 30, after serving as the left-handed specialist to the Braves in 2011. With the departure of Sherrill, Fish has the opportunity to provide that role to the bullpen in 2012. No players were selected from the Braves organization by other teams in the Draft.

December 13: Following the deadline to tender contracts to arbitration-eligible players the previous night, the Braves declined to tender 2012 contracts to relief pitcher Peter Moylan and infielder Brooks Conrad, who would later be signed to a Minor League contract by the Brewers in January. All other arbitration-eligible players on the Braves roster, including center fielder Michael Bourn, left fielder Martín Prado, starting pitcher Jair Jurrjens, and reliever Eric O'Flaherty, were tendered contracts.

==== January 2012 ====
January 13: After being named in trade rumors for much of the offseason, Braves utility man and 2011 starting left-fielder Martín Prado signed a one-year contract worth $4.75 million with the Braves for the 2012 season. The move assures that Prado will not go through the salary arbitration process and will likely return to the team for the 2012 campaign.

On the same day, backup infielder Jack Wilson agreed to terms for a one-year contract worth $1 million. Wilson was acquired by the organization from the Seattle Mariners on August 31, 2011. The 34-year-old veteran will provide a dependable backup for Tyler Pastornicky, the projected starting shortstop who will be making his Major League debut. During the offseason, Wilson and Pastornicky have already been training together.

January 17: Only days after agreeing to avoid arbitration with Prado, the Braves agreed to a one-year contract worth $2.49 million with reliever Eric O'Flaherty. Making $895,000 in 2011, the left-handed pitcher posted a 0.98 ERA in 78 appearances, leading all Major League relievers. O'Flaherty also became the first pitcher in Major League history to post a sub-1.00 ERA with at least 70 appearances. Hours later, the Braves avoided arbitration on starting pitcher Jair Jurrjens and center fielder Michael Bourn, the final two arbitration-eligible players on the Braves roster, by tendering them both one-year contracts. Both clients of Scott Boras, Jurrjens will receive $5.5 million and Bourn will receive $6.845 million in 2012. Later the same day, the Braves announced the signing of free agent relief pitcher Peter Moylan to a one-year Minor League contract worth $1 million. Moylan, who suffered injuries through most of the 2011 season, was not tendered a contract by the Braves which would have allowed him to undergo the arbitration process. Expecting around $2 million through arbitration, the Braves felt Moylan's surgically repaired right shoulder posed too much of an injury risk. With his contract including an invitation to the Major League spring training camp, Moylan will have an opportunity to prove his health.

== Spring training ==
The Braves officially announced their 2012 spring training schedule on November 16, 2011. Pitchers and catchers were scheduled to report on February 19 and all other players were due to report by February 24. The 34-game spring slate began on March 3 against the Detroit Tigers in Champion Stadium, located at the ESPN Wide World of Sports Complex in Lake Buena Vista. Champion Stadium has been the Braves' Spring training home in Florida for the past fifteen seasons.

=== Non-roster invitees ===
The team announced on November 22, 2011 the signing of eleven Minor League free agents and invited them all to the Major League Spring training camp. Four of these players spent significant time at the Major League level in 2011, including relief pitchers Adam Russell and Dusty Hughes. Russell pitched in 36 games for the Tampa Bay Rays while Hughes pitched in 15 games for the Minnesota Twins. Infielder Drew Sutton batted .315 in 54 at-bats for the Boston Red Sox and infielder Josh Wilson served as a backup infielder for the Milwaukee Brewers during the second half of the season. Other players signed include pitchers Jason Rice and Yohan Flande, catchers J. C. Boscán and José Yépez, outfielders Luis Durango and Jordan Parraz, and infielder Ernesto Mejia. On January 13, 2011 the team extended invitations to several promising prospects. Rising third baseman Joe Terdoslavich and starting pitcher Sean Gilmartin highlight the group of promising players set to showcase their skills. Catcher Christian Bethancourt, shortstop Andrelton Simmons, center fielder Todd Cunningham, pitcher Zeke Spruill, and outfielder Stefan Gartrell will also appear as non-roster invitees.

=== Injuries ===
After dealing with increasing back pain for several seasons, Braves starter Tim Hudson underwent back surgery on November 28, 2011. Hudson stated that he had been using anti-inflammatory medication for the past two years to deal with the pain. After the procedure, Hudson's mobility has greatly improved and he anticipates that the surgery will prolong his career. Because the procedure requires three to six months for proper recovery, Hudson does not expect his 2012 debut to come until early May. In his absence Randall Delgado will occupy his rotation spot. Recovering with haste, Hudson started the final exhibition game in Florida on April 2 against the New York Mets. In two scoreless innings of work, Hudson allowed only one hit and struck out two while throwing every pitch in his arsenal.

Driving to Champion Stadium for the first day of workouts for pitchers and catchers, Braves starter Tommy Hanson was involved in a one-car accident that caused him to bump his head around seven in the morning on February 20, 2012. After arriving at the stadium, Hanson informed the medical staff of the incident, stating that he was feeling abnormal. Seeking medical attention, Hanson was diagnosed with a Grade 1 concussion, providing a delay in his spring workouts. The Braves medical staff performed several concussion impact tests on Hanson to gauge when a return to normal workouts would be appropriate. Hanson did not expect to miss his first start of the regular season. After a full recovery and ample time for preparation during spring training, Hanson was assigned as the Opening Day starter, making his first start against the New York Mets on April 5.

On the same day as he announced his retirement from baseball, Braves third baseman Chipper Jones also announced that he would be undergoing surgery to repair a torn meniscus in his left knee, a process that would place him on the Disabled List through Opening Day on April 5. Jones has stated repeatedly that he will make his first appearance of the season in the Home Opener on April 13 against the Milwaukee Brewers.

=== Spring transactions ===
Names highlighted in bold appear on the table above.

Nearing the end of their spring training schedule, the Braves made three significant transactions to bolster their Opening Day roster. On March 30, the Braves signed free agent Liván Hernández only hours after he was released from the Houston Astros camp. Signed to a one-year contract, Hernández will provide a veteran presence in the bullpen and act as a long reliever and, if necessary, a spot starter in the event of an injury. On April 1, the organization traded Minor League pitching prospect J. J. Hoover to the Cincinnati Reds for third baseman Juan Francisco. Wren stated that the team had coveted Francisco for the past few years. Francisco will provide Prado a backup at third when Chipper cannot man the position. Finally, on April 3, the Braves signed veteran reliever Chad Durbin to a one-year contract after he was released from the Washington Nationals camp. Durbin will provide added depth to the bullpen.

=== Braves Future Stars Game ===
Rather than concluding Spring training with two games at Turner Field against a Major League team as had been the tradition in previous seasons, the Braves played their final exhibition game on April 3 at Coolray Field, the regular season home of the Triple-A affiliate Gwinnett Braves. The complete Major League club hosted a team composed of the top prospects in the Braves' farm system. The Braves Future Stars game is praised as an opportunity to highlight upcoming prospects. The organization announced on February 3 that former Braves manager Bobby Cox, who retired following the 2010 season, would manage the Future Stars team against the Major League club.

In the top of the first Matt Lipka, the first batter of the game, was walked by Braves pitcher Mike Minor. After stealing second and advancing on an error, Lipka scored on a groundout that gave the Future Stars an early lead. Braves starting second baseman Dan Uggla launched a solo home run in the bottom of the second off Futures starter Sean Gilmartin to tie the game at one. The home run was Uggla's seventh of the Spring, tying him for the Major League lead. Liván Hernández, who was acquired in a trade only a few days before, relieved Minor in the fourth, throwing a scoreless frame. Reliever Cristhian Martínez followed in the fifth, allowing the Futures two runs to give them a lead of 3–1. In the bottom of the inning, an RBI double by starting center fielder Michael Bourn plated Juan Francisco, also just acquired in a trade a few days prior. Martín Prado continued the scoring with an RBI triple to score Bourn and starting catcher Brian McCann followed with an RBI double to plate Prado, giving the Major League team a 4–3 advantage. After scoreless outings by Kris Medlen and Eric O'Flaherty, the remainder of the game was canceled due to rain. Manager Fredi González stated that Jonny Venters and Craig Kimbrel would have pitched the eighth and ninth innings, respectively.

April 3, 2012 7:05 p.m. (EDT) at Coolray Field in Lawrenceville, Georgia.

Team	1	2	3	4	5	6	7	8	9	R	H	E
Braves Future Stars	1	0	0	0	2	0	0	-	-	**3**	**5**	**1**
**Atlanta**	0	1	0	0	3	0	0	-	-	**4**	**8**	**2**
WP: Mike Minor (1–0) LP: J. R. Graham (0–1) Sv: Eric O'Flaherty (1); Home runs: FUT: None; ATL: Dan Uggla (1)

== Regular season ==
=== Opening Day ===
After finishing their spring training schedule two days prior, the Atlanta Braves began their season on Opening Day as the guests for the New York Mets home opener at Citi Field on April 5. Tommy Hanson, making the first Opening Day start of his career, faced Mets ace Johan Santana, who was making his first Major League appearance since September 2010. The first game proved to be dominated by defense and pitching. In the bottom of the sixth, Mets third baseman David Wright singled home center fielder Andrés Torres to give the Mets a 1–0 advantage, which would end up being the final score of the game. Hanson took the loss, giving up just the one earned run in five plus innings of work. Kris Medlen and Jonny Venters followed with three scoreless innings in relief, but the offense could never find the scoreboard. The Opening Day loss was only the second in the last seven seasons and the first since 2008.

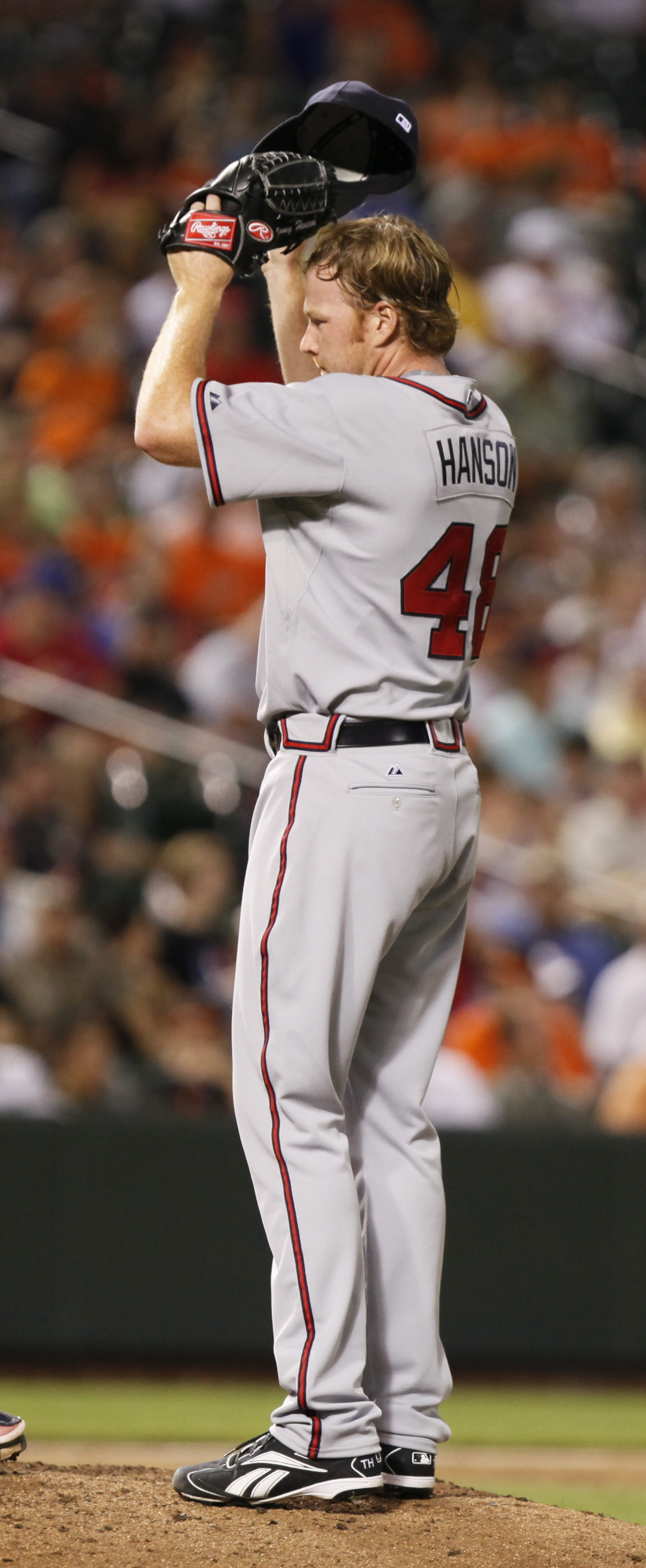
Tommy Hanson made his first Opening Day start in 2012, taking the loss in a 0–1 defeat to the Mets.

Position	Name
Starting Pitcher	Tommy Hanson
Catcher	Brian McCann
First Baseman	Freddie Freeman
Second Baseman	Dan Uggla
Third Baseman	Martín Prado
Shortstop	Tyler Pastornicky
Left Fielder	Matt Diaz
Center Fielder	Michael Bourn
Right Fielder	Jason Heyward

=== Chipper Jones retirement ===
After nineteen seasons with the Atlanta Braves, third baseman Chipper Jones announced on March 22, 2012 that he would retire following the end of the season. Jones held a news conference the same day at Champion Stadium, the Spring training home of the team. The entire Braves team and former manager Bobby Cox were in attendance for the official announcement. Having spent the first eighteen seasons of his career with the Braves, Chipper leads all active players in years of service with one club. His first year with the team, the 1995 season, was the year the Braves won their first World Championship in Atlanta. Chipper remains as the last active player from that Championship team. After sitting out the first four games of the season due to a knee injury, Jones hit a home run in his season debut against the Houston Astros on April 10. Five days later, Jones hit a home run in his first game of the season at Turner Field.

=== Game log ===
Legend
Braves Win	Braves Loss	Game postponed

2012 Regular Season Game Log
April (14–9)

#	Date	Opponent	Score	Win	Loss	Save	Attendance	Time	Record
1	April 5	@ Mets	0–1	Ramírez (1–0)	Hanson (0–1)	Francisco (1)	42,080	2:39	0–1
2	April 7	@ Mets	2–4	Dickey (1–0)	Jurrjens (0–1)	Francisco (2)	39,526	2:53	0–2
3	April 8	@ Mets	5–7	Niese (1–0)	Minor (0–1)	Francisco (3)	27,855	2:46	0–3
4	April 9	@ Astros	3–8	Happ (1–0)	Beachy (0–1)		17,095	2:46	0–4
5	April 10	@ Astros	6–4	Hanson (1–1)	Weiland (0–1)	Kimbrel (1)	22,036	3:12	1–4
6	April 11	@ Astros	6–3	Delgado (1–0)	Rodríguez (0–1)	Kimbrel (2)	18,225	3:21	2–4
7	April 13	Brewers	10–8	Venters (1–0)	Rodríguez (0–1)	Kimbrel (3)	50,635	3:22	3–4
8	April 14	Brewers	2–1	Minor (1–1)	Marcum (1–1)	Kimbrel (4)	37,408	2:44	4–4
9	April 15	Brewers	7–4	Beachy (1–1)	Narveson (1–1)		30,831	2:58	5–4
10	April 16	Mets	1–6	Gee (1–1)	Hanson (1–2)		16,161	2:24	5–5
11	April 17	Mets	9–3	Delgado (2–0)	Santana (0–2)		18,732	2:53	6–5
12	April 18	Mets	14–6	Martínez (1–0)	Dickey (2–1)		17,909	3:17	7–5
13	April 19	@ Diamondbacks	10–2	Minor (2–1)	Collmenter (0–1)		18,110	2:49	8–5
14	April 20	@ Diamondbacks	9–1	Beachy (2–1)	Cahill (1–1)		27,761	2:50	9–5
15	April 21	@ Diamondbacks	3–2	Hanson (2–2)	Saunders (1–1)	Kimbrel (5)	30,188	2:17	10–5
16	April 22	@ Diamondbacks	4–6	Kennedy (3–0)	Delgado (2–1)	Putz (5)	28,679	2:36	10–6
17	April 23	@ Dodgers	2–7	Capuano (2–0)	Jurrjens (0–2)		26,376	2:49	10–7
18	April 24	@ Dodgers	4–3	O'Flaherty (1–0)	Guerra (1–2)	Kimbrel (6)	44,014	2:59	11–7
19	April 25	@ Dodgers	4–2	Venters (2–0)	Guerra (1–3)	Kimbrel (7)	26,345	2:54	12–7
20	April 27	Pirates	6–1	Hanson (3–2)	Burnett (1–1)	Medlen (1)	36,215	2:57	13–7
21	April 28	Pirates	2–4	Bédard (1–4)	Delgado (2–2)	Hanrahan (4)	34,086	3:13	13–8
22	April 29	Pirates	4–3	Hudson (1–0)	Correia (1–1)	Kimbrel (8)	30,419	3:25	14–8
23	April 30	Pirates	3–9	McDonald (1–1)	Minor (2–2)		17,181	2:49	14–9

May (14–15)

#	Date	Opponent	Score	Win	Loss	Save	Attendance	Time	Record
24	May 1	Phillies	2–4	Bastardo (1–1)	Venters (2–1)	Papelbon (9)	21,640	2:46	14–10
25	May 2	Phillies	15–13 (11)	Durbin (1–0)	Sanches (0–1)		26,504	4:00	15–10
26	May 3	Phillies	0–4	Blanton (3–3)	Delgado (2–3)		24,015	2:02	15–11
27	May 4	@ Rockies	9–8 (11)	Durbin (2–0)	Escalona (0–1)	Kimbrel (9)	33,184	4:00	16–11
28	May 5	@ Rockies	13–9	Martínez (2–0)	Rogers (0–2)	Hernández (1)	40,013	3:27	17–11
29	May 6	@ Rockies	7–2	Beachy (3–1)	Nicasio (2–1)	Martínez (1)	45,330	2:43	18–11
30	May 7	@ Cubs	1–5	Samardzija (4–1)	Hanson (3–3)		36,307	2:45	18–12
31	May 8	@ Cubs	3–1	Medlen (1–0)	Wood (0–2)	Kimbrel (10)	38,523	2:47	19–12
32	May 9	@ Cubs	0–1	Maholm (4–2)	Hudson (1–1)	Dolis (3)	31,904	2:05	19–13
33	May 11	@ Cardinals	9–7 (12)	Hernández (1–0)	McClellan (0–1)	Kimbrel (11)	45,190	3:56	20–13
34	May 12	@ Cardinals	7–2	Beachy (4–1)	Wainwright (2–4)		44,157	2:55	21–13
35	May 13	@ Cardinals	7–4	Hanson (4–3)	Lynn (6–1)		45,729	3:33	22–13
36	May 14	Reds	1–3	Ondrusek (3–0)	Venters (2–2)	Marshall (6)	19,697	3:02	22–14
37	May 15	Reds	6–2	Hudson (2–1)	Cueto (4–1)		21,530	2:51	23–14
38	May 16	Marlins	4–8	Buehrle (3–4)	Minor (2–3)		21,106	2:49	23–15
39	May 17	Marlins	7–0	Beachy (5–1)	Nolasco (4–2)		27,724	2:42	24–15
40	May 18	@ Rays	5–3	Hanson (5–3)	Shields (6–2)	Kimbrel (12)	19,693	3:04	25–15
41	May 19	@ Rays	2–5	Cobb (1–0)	Delgado (2–4)	Rodney (13)	27,433	2:48	25–16
42	May 20	@ Rays	2–0	Hudson (3–1)	Price (6–3)	Kimbrel (13)	24,759	2:34	26–16
43	May 21	@ Reds	1–4	Leake (1–5)	Minor (2–4)	Marshall (8)	17,606	2:34	26–17
44	May 22	@ Reds	3–4	Latos (3–2)	Beachy (5–2)	Chapman (2)	26,438	2:33	26–18
45	May 23	@ Reds	1–2	Chapman (4–0)	Martínez (2–1)		20,411	2:49	26–19
46	May 24	@ Reds	3–6	Baliey (3–3)	Delgado (2–5)	Ondrusek (2)	23,312	2:29	26–20
47	May 25	Nationals	4–7	Wang (1–0)	Hudson (3–2)	Clippard (2)	37,663	2:55	26–21
48	May 26	Nationals	4–8	Strasburg (5–1)	Medlen (1–1)	Clippard (3)	42,698	3:10	26–22
49	May 27	Nationals	2–7	Gonzalez (7–1)	Beachy (5–3)		38,543	3:10	26–23
50	May 28	Cardinals	2–8	Lynn (8–1)	Hanson (5–4)		42,426	3:10	26–24
51	May 29	Cardinals	5–4	Delgado (3–5)	Westbrook (4–4)	Kimbrel (14)	26,218	2:43	27–24
52	May 30	Cardinals	10–7	Venters (3–2)	Rzepczynski (0–3)	Kimbrel (15)	28,474	2:44	28–24

June (13–12)

#	Date	Opponent	Score	Win	Loss	Save	Attendance	Time	Record
–	June 1	@ Nationals	Game Postponed (rain) (rescheduled July 21)						
53	June 2	@ Nationals	0–2	Strasburg (6–1)	Beachy (5–4)	Clippard (4)	41,042	2:35	28–25
54	June 3	@ Nationals	3–2	Hanson (6–4)	Gonzalez (7–2)	Kimbrel (16)	38,046	2:38	29–25
55	June 5	@ Marlins	11–0	Hudson (4–2)	Sánchez (3–4)		25,432	2:36	30–25
56	June 6	@ Marlins	2–1	Delgado (4–5)	Johnson (3–4)	Kimbrel (17)	22,619	2:30	31–25
57	June 7	@ Marlins	8–2	Minor (3–4)	Buehrle (5–6)		22,402	3:14	32–25
58	June 8	Blue Jays	4–3 (10)	Martínez (3–1)	Cordero (1–4)		42,488	3:53	33–25
59	June 9	Blue Jays	5–2	Hanson (7–4)	Hutchison (5–3)	Kimbrel (18)	32,819	2:34	34–25
60	June 10	Blue Jays	4–12	Villanueva (1–0)	Hernández (1–1)		20,222	3:14	34–26
61	June 11	Yankees	0–3	Nova (8–2)	Delgado (4–6)		42,669	3:01	34–27
62	June 12	Yankees	4–6	Sabathia (8–3)	Venters (3–3)	Soriano (10)	41,452	3:04	34–28
63	June 13	Yankees	2–3	Kuroda (6–6)	Hudson (4–3)	Soriano (11)	48,938	3:36	34–29
64	June 15	Orioles	4–2	Durbin (3–0)	Matusz (5–7)	Kimbrel (19)	30,384	2:55	35–29
65	June 16	Orioles	0–5	Hammel (7–2)	Beachy (5–5)		41,131	2:22	35–30
66	June 17	Orioles	0–2	Chen (7–2)	Delgado (4–7)	Johnson (20)	29,530	2:33	35–31
67	June 18	@ Yankees	2–6	Sabathia (9–3)	Minor (3–5)		42,709	2:45	35–32
68	June 19	@ Yankees	4–3	Hudson (5–3)	Kuroda (6–7)	Kimbrel (20)	41,219	2:57	36–32
69	June 20	@ Yankees	10–5	Hanson (8–4)	Hughes (7–6)		45,094	3:21	37–32
70	June 22	@ Red Sox	4–1	Jurrjens (1–2)	Lester (4–5)	Kimbrel (21)	37,281	2:55	38–32
71	June 23	@ Red Sox	4–8	Morales (1–1)	Delgado (4–8)		37,782	3:03	38–33
72	June 24	@ Red Sox	4–9	Cook (1–1)	Minor (3–6)		37,565	2:55	38–34
73	June 26	Diamondbacks	8–1	Hudson (6–3)	Hudson (3–2)		25,513	3:01	39–34
74	June 27	Diamondbacks	6–4	Hanson (9–4)	Cahill (6–6)	Kimbrel (22)	20,039	2:35	40–34
75	June 28	Diamondbacks	2–3	Hernandez (1–1)	Kimbrel (0–1)	Putz (14)	21,913	3:13	40–35
76	June 29	Nationals	4–5	Burnett (1–1)	Durbin (3–1)	Clippard (13)	32,299	3:15	40–36
77	June 30	Nationals	7–5	Minor (4–6)	Strasburg (9–3)	Kimbrel (23)	26,491	3:14	41–36

July (18–8)

#	Date	Opponent	Score	Win	Loss	Save	Attendance	Time	Record
78	July 1	Nationals	4–8	Gonzalez (11–3)	Hudson (6–4)		18,796	3:02	41–37
79	July 2	Cubs	1–4	Samardzija (6–7)	Hanson (9–5)	Russell (2)	22,292	2:32	41–38
80	July 3	Cubs	10–3	Jurrjens (2–2)	Volstad (0–7)		27,834	3:01	42–38
81	July 4	Cubs	1–5	Maholm (6–6)	Delgado (4–9)		40,604	2:46	42–39
82	July 5	Cubs	7–3	Minor (5–6)	Garza (4–7)		24,408	2:50	43–39
83	July 6	@ Phillies	5–0	Hudson (7–4)	Bastardo (2–3)		44,441	2:33	44–39
84	July 7	@ Phillies	6–3	Hanson (10–5)	Blanton (7–8)	Kimbrel (24)	44,797	2:47	45–39
85	July 8	@ Phillies	4–3	Jurrjens (3–2)	Valdés (2–2)	Kimbrel (25)	43,881	2:48	46–39
–	July 10	2012 Major League Baseball All-Star Game in Kansas City, Missouri							
86	July 13	Mets	7–5	Martínez (4–1)	Young (2–3)	Kimbrel (26)	37,020	3:41	47–39
87	July 14	Mets	8–7	Varvaro (1–0)	Parnell (2–2)	Kimbrel (27)	32,565	3:31	48–39
88	July 15	Mets	6–1	Sheets (1–0)	Santana (6–6)		23,382	2:40	49–39
89	July 17	Giants	0–9	Zito (8–6)	Jurrjens (3–3)		29,623	3:00	49–40
90	July 18	Giants	4–9 (11)	Casilla (3–4)	Varvaro (1–1)		29,410	4:08	49–41
91	July 19	Giants	3–2	Hudson (8–4)	Bumgarner (11–6)	Kimbrel (28)	29,635	2:21	50–41
92	July 20	@ Nationals	11–10 (11)	O'Flaherty (2–0)	Gorzelanny (2–2)	Durbin (1)	34,228	4:21	51–41
93	July 21	@ Nationals	4–0	Sheets (2–0)	Jackson (5–6)		28,745	3:07	52–41
94	July 21	@ Nationals	2–5	Lannan (1–0)	Martínez (4–2)	Clippard (16)	40,047	2:56	52–42
95	July 22	@ Nationals	2–9	Detwiler (5–3)	Jurrjens (3–4)		34,917	2:51	52–43
96	July 23	@ Marlins	1–2	Johnson (6–7)	Minor (5–7)	Cishek (3)	29,019	2:33	52–44
97	July 24	@ Marlins	4–3	Hudson (9–4)	LeBlanc (1–1)	Kimbrel (29)	25,616	2:36	53–44
98	July 25	@ Marlins	7–1	Hanson (11–5)	Nolasco (8–9)		36,711	2:46	54–44
99	July 27	Phillies	6–1	Sheets (3–0)	Hamels (11–5)		42,239	2:44	55–44
100	July 28	Phillies	2–1	Minor (6–7)	Blanton (8–9)	Kimbrel (30)	39,886	2:14	56–44
101	July 29	Phillies	6–2	Hudson (10–4)	Halladay (4–6)		23,726	2:55	57–44
102	July 30	Marlins	8–2	Hanson (12–5)	Buehrle (9–10)		22,264	2:55	58–44
103	July 31	Marlins	7–1	Medlen (2–1)	Nolasco (8–10)		21,819	2:42	59–44

August (15–14)

#	Date	Opponent	Score	Win	Loss	Save	Attendance	Time	Record
104	August 1	Marlins	2–4	Zambrano (6–9)	Sheets (3–1)	Cishek (5)	18,133	3:03	59–45
105	August 2	Marlins	6–1	Martínez (5–2)	Eovaldi (2–7)		19,685	2:56	60–45
106	August 3	Astros	4–1	Hudson (11–4)	Galarraga (0–1)	Kimbrel (31)	28,300	3:03	61–45
107	August 4	Astros	2–3	Harrell (9–7)	Maholm (9–7)	López (1)	30,029	2:33	61–46
108	August 5	Astros	6–1	Venters (4–3)	Norris (5–9)		23,474	3:01	62–46
109	August 6	@ Phillies	6–1	Sheets (4–1)	Worley (6–7)		41,665	2:37	63–46
110	August 7	@ Phillies	0–3	Hamels (12–6)	Minor (6–8)		42,660	2:16	63–47
111	August 8	@ Phillies	12–6	Durbin (4–1)	Bastardo (2–4)		41,501	3:14	64–47
112	August 10	@ Mets	4–0	Maholm (10–7)	Harvey (1–3)		25,101	2:24	65–47
113	August 11	@ Mets	9–3	Medlen (3–1)	Santana (6–8)		30,388	2:44	66–47
114	August 12	@ Mets	5–6	Niese (9–6)	Sheets (4–2)	Rauch (2)	24,891	2:46	66–48
115	August 13	Padres	1–4	Stults (3–2)	Minor (6–9)	Thayer (6)	18,250	2:23	66–49
116	August 14	Padres	6–0	Hudson (12–4)	Richard (9–12)		16,427	2:37	67–49
117	August 15	Padres	6–1	Maholm (11–7)	Vólquez (7–9)		16,302	2:46	68–49
118	August 16	Padres	6–0	Medlen (4–1)	Marquis (8–11)		33,157	2:30	69–49
119	August 17	Dodgers	4–3 (11)	Venters (5–3)	League (0–6)		33,093	3:36	70–49
120	August 18	Dodgers	2–6	Harang (9–7)	Sheets (4–3)	Jansen (25)	42,219	2:52	70–50
121	August 19	Dodgers	0–5	Billingsley (10–9)	Minor (6–10)		26,798	2:52	70–51
122	August 20	@ Nationals	4–5 (13)	Stammen (6–1)	Martínez (5–3)		21,298	4:27	70–52
123	August 21	@ Nationals	1–4	Strasburg (15–5)	Maholm (11–8)	Clippard (28)	33,888	2:24	70–53
124	August 22	@ Nationals	5–1	Medlen (5–1)	Detwiler (7–6)		29,111	2:51	71–53
125	August 23	@ Giants	2–5	Zito (10–8)	Hanson (12–6)	Romo (6)	41,645	2:53	71–54
126	August 24	@ Giants	3–5	Vogelsong (11–7)	Sheets (4–4)	López (4)	41,486	2:24	71–55
127	August 25	@ Giants	7–3	Minor (7–10)	Bumgarner (14–8)		41,679	3:15	72–55
128	August 26	@ Giants	7–1	Hudson (13–4)	Lincecum (7–14)		41,735	2:55	73–55
129	August 27	@ Padres	0–3	Kelly (1–0)	Maholm (11–9)	Gregerson (2)	20,590	2:24	73–56
130	August 28	@ Padres	2–0	Medlen (6–1)	Werner (1–1)	Kimbrel (32)	20,955	2:33	74–56
131	August 29	@ Padres	2–8	Stults (5–2)	Hanson (12–7)		16,845	2:49	74–57
132	August 31	Phillies	5–8 (10)	Lindblom (3–3)	Martínez (5–4)	Papelbon (31)	31,203	3:21	74–58

September/October (20–10)

#	Date	Opponent	Score	Win	Loss	Save	Attendance	Time	Record
133	September 1	Phillies	1–5	Lee (4–7)	Hudson (13–5)		44,749	3:04	74–59
134	September 2	Phillies	8–7	Moylan (1–0)	Papelbon (3–6)		36,394	3:28	75–59
135	September 3	Rockies	6–1	Medlen (7–1)	Chatwood (4–4)		24,848	2:39	76–59
136	September 4	Rockies	0–6	Torres (4–1)	Hanson (12–8)		16,686	3:18	76–60
137	September 5	Rockies	1–0	Minor (8–10)	White (2–8)	Kimbrel (33)	16,714	2:48	77–60
138	September 6	Rockies	1–0	Hudson (14–5)	Chacín (2–5)	Kimbrel (34)	19,313	2:52	78–60
139	September 7	@ Mets	3–0	Maholm (12–9)	Niese (10–9)	Kimbrel (35)	24,071	2:56	79–60
140	September 8	@ Mets	11–3	Medlen (8–1)	Hefner (2–6)		25,603	3:02	80–60
141	September 9	@ Mets	3–2 (10)	Kimbrel (1–1)	Parnell (4–4)	Moylan (1)	23,161	3:17	81–60
142	September 10	@ Brewers	1–4	Veras (4–4)	Venters (5–4)	Axford (28)	34,395	3:09	81–61
143	September 11	@ Brewers	0–5	Estrada (3–6)	Hudson (14–6)		27,382	2:41	81–62
144	September 12	@ Brewers	2–8	Gallardo (15–8)	Maholm (12–10)		37,847	2:53	81–63
145	September 14	Nationals	2–1	Kimbrel (2–1)	Burnett (1–2)		41,797	2:43	82–63
146	September 15	Nationals	5–4	O'Flaherty (3–0)	Mattheus (5–2)	Kimbrel (36)	38,763	3:22	83–63
147	September 16	Nationals	5–1	Minor (9–10)	Gonzalez (19–8)		29,094	3:05	84–63
148	September 17	@ Marlins	7–5	Hudson (15–6)	LeBlanc (2–5)	Kimbrel (37)	23,308	2:52	85–63
149	September 18	@ Marlins	3–4 (10)	Bell (3–5)	Gearrin (0–1)		23,009	3:13	85–64
150	September 19	@ Marlins	3–0	Medlen (9–1)	Johnson (8–13)	Kimbrel (38)	25,998	2:34	86–64
151	September 21	@ Phillies	2–6	Kendrick (10–11)	Hanson (12–9)		44,052	2:36	86–65
152	September 22	@ Phillies	8–2	Minor (10–10)	Halladay (10–8)		45,377	3:09	87–65
153	September 23	@ Phillies	2–1	Hudson (16–6)	Lee (6–8)	Kimbrel (39)	43,968	2:31	88–65
154	September 25	Marlins	4–3	Kimbrel (3–1)	Dunn (0–3)		25,632	2:24	89–65
155	September 26	Marlins	3–0	Maholm (13–10)	Johnson (8–14)	Kimbrel (40)	23,420	2:37	90–65
156	September 27	Marlins	6–2	Hanson (13–9)	Turner (2–5)		27,270	2:46	91–65
157	September 28	Mets	1–3	Niese (13–9)	Hudson (16–7)	Parnell (6)	51,910	2:31	91–66
158	September 29	Mets	2–0	Minor (11–10)	Young (4–9)	Kimbrel (41)	48,310	2:33	92–66
159	September 30	Mets	6–2	Medlen (10–1)	Mejía (1–2)	Kimbrel (42)	50,635	2:50	93–66
160	October 1	@ Pirates	1–2	Locke (1–3)	Maholm (13–11)	Hughes (2)	15,009	2:38	93–67
161	October 2	@ Pirates	1–5	Correia (12–11)	Hanson (13–10)		15,727	2:38	93–68
162	October 3	@ Pirates	4–0	Avilán (1–0)	Burnett (16–10)		20,615	2:45	94–68

=== Season standings ===
==== NL East standings ====
NL East
Team	W	L	Pct.	GB	Home	Road
Washington Nationals	98	64	.605	—	50‍–‍31	48‍–‍33
Atlanta Braves	94	68	.580	4	48‍–‍33	46‍–‍35
Philadelphia Phillies	81	81	.500	17	40‍–‍41	41‍–‍40
New York Mets	74	88	.457	24	36‍–‍45	38‍–‍43
Miami Marlins	69	93	.426	29	38‍–‍43	31‍–‍50

==== NL Wild Card ====
Division leaders
Team	W	L	Pct.
Washington Nationals	98	64	.605
Cincinnati Reds	97	65	.599
San Francisco Giants	94	68	.580

Wild Card teams (Top 2 teams qualify for postseason)
Team	W	L	Pct.	GB
Atlanta Braves	94	68	.580	+6
St. Louis Cardinals	88	74	.543	—
Los Angeles Dodgers	86	76	.531	2
Milwaukee Brewers	83	79	.512	5
Philadelphia Phillies	81	81	.500	7
Arizona Diamondbacks	81	81	.500	7
Pittsburgh Pirates	79	83	.488	9
San Diego Padres	76	86	.469	12
New York Mets	74	88	.457	14
Miami Marlins	69	93	.426	19
Colorado Rockies	64	98	.395	24
Chicago Cubs	61	101	.377	27
Houston Astros	55	107	.340	33

==== Record vs. opponents ====
2012 National League record Source: MLB Standings Grid – 2012
Team	AZ	ATL	CHC	CIN	COL	MIA	HOU	LAD	MIL	NYM	PHI	PIT	SD	SF	STL	WSH	AL
Arizona	–	2–5	5–4	2–5	9–7	5–3	6–0	12–6	3–3	3–4	2–4	3–4	7–11	9–9	1–5	2–4	9–6
Atlanta	5–2	–	3–4	1–5	6–1	14–4	4–2	3–3	3–3	12–6	12–6	3–4	4–3	3–4	5–1	8–10	8–10
Chicago	4–5	4–3	–	4–12	2–4	8–5	2–4	2–4	4–13	4–2	2–4	8–8	3–3	1–6	7–10	1–6	5–10
Cincinnati	5–2	5–1	12–4	–	5–1	10–5	2–4	3–3	9–6	6–2	3–4	11–7	6–2	4–3	6–7	2–5	7–8
Colorado	7–9	1–6	4–2	1–5	–	5–2	5–2	8–10	5–1	5–2	2–7	2–4	8–10	4–14	2–5	4–3	2–13
Houston	0–6	2–4	5–8	5–10	2–5	–	2–4	2–4	8–9	4–2	3–3	5–12	3–5	1–8	4–11	1–7	6–9
Los Angeles	6–12	3–3	4–2	4–2	10–8	4–2	–	4–2	1–6	4–3	5–2	6–1	11–7	8-10	6–5	4–2	6–9
Miami	3–5	4–14	4–2	3–3	4–3	–	4-2	2-4	4–4	4–12	8–10	1–4	5–1	5–2	2–5	9–9	5–13
Milwaukee	3–3	3–3	13–4	6–9	1–5	9–8	6–1	4–4	–	3–2	2–5	11–4	3–4	2–4	6–9	3–5	6–9
New York	4–3	6–12	2–4	2–6	2–5	2–4	3–4	12–4	2–3	–	10–8	5–2	4–3	4–4	4–3	4–14	8–7
Philadelphia	4–2	6–12	4–2	4–3	7–2	3–3	2–5	10–8	5–2	8–10	–	3–4	4–3	2–4	5–2	9-9	5–10
Pittsburgh	4–3	2–3	8–8	7–11	4–2	4–1	12–5	1–6	4–11	2–5	4–3	–	1–5	3–3	8–7	3–2	10–8
San Diego	11–7	3–4	3–3	2–6	10–8	5–3	7–11	1–5	4–3	3–4	3–4	5–1	–	6–12	3–3	2–3	8–7
San Francisco	9–9	4–3	6–1	3–4	14–4	2–5	8–1	10–8	4–2	4–4	4–2	3–3	12–6	–	3–3	1–5	7–8
St. Louis	5–1	1–5	10–7	7–6	5–2	11–4	5–6	5–2	9–6	3–4	3–4	7–8	3–3	3–3	–	3–4	8–7
Washington	4–2	10–8	6–1	5–2	3–4	7–1	2–4	9–9	5–3	14–4	9-9	2–3	3–2	5-1	4-3	–	10–8

Note that the teams not included in the wild card standings are currently leading their divisions and that the top two teams earn Wild Card berths.

== Roster ==
2012 Atlanta Braves
Roster
Pitchers: 43 Luis Avilán; 52 Miguel Batista; 37 Brandon Beachy; 40 Randall Delgado; 32 Chad Durbin; 53 Cory Gearrin; 48 Tommy Hanson; 15 Tim Hudson; 49 Jair Jurrjens; 46 Craig Kimbrel; 17 Paul Maholm; 50 Cristhian Martínez; 54 Kris Medlen; 36 Mike Minor; 58 Peter Moylan; 34 Eric O'Flaherty; 30 Ben Sheets; 27,56 Julio Teherán; 38 Anthony Varvaro; 39 Jonny Venters	Catchers: 7 J. C. Boscán; 16 Brian McCann; 8 David Ross; Infielders: 2 Jeff Baker; 25 Juan Francisco; 5 Freddie Freeman; 4 Paul Janish; 10 Chipper Jones; 1 Tyler Pastornicky; 27 Lyle Overbay; 19 Andrelton Simmons; 26 Dan Uggla; 2 Jack Wilson	Outfielders: 24 Michael Bourn; 13,17 José Constanza; 23 Matt Diaz; 22 Jason Heyward; 20 Eric Hinske; 11 Reed Johnson; 14 Martín Prado	Manager: 33 Fredi González; Coaches: 62 Scott Fletcher (assistant hitting); 45 Roger McDowell (pitching); 9 Terry Pendleton (first base); 12 Eddie Pérez (bullpen); 51 Brian Snitker (third base); 18 Carlos Tosca (bench); 28 Greg Walker (hitting)

== Postseason ==
=== Wild Card Game ===
Team	1	2	3	4	5	6	7	8	9	R	H	E
St. Louis Cardinals	0	0	0	3	0	1	2	0	0	6	6	0
Atlanta Braves	0	2	0	0	0	0	1	0	0	3	12	3
WP: Kyle Lohse (1–0) LP: Kris Medlen (0–1) Sv: Jason Motte (1); Home runs: STL: Matt Holliday (1); ATL: David Ross (1)

== Player statistics ==
=== Batting ===
Note: G = Games played; AB = At bats; R = Runs scored; H = Hits; AVG = Batting average; HR = Home runs; RBI = Runs batted in

Player	G	AB	R	H	AVG	HR	RBI
Jeff Baker	14	19	1	2	.105	0	1
J. C. Boscan	6	10	0	2	.200	0	2
Michael Bourn	155	624	96	171	.274	9	57
José Constanza	37	76	8	19	.250	0	4
Matt Diaz	51	108	10	24	.222	2	13
Juan Francisco	93	192	17	45	.234	9	32
Freddie Freeman	147	540	91	140	.259	23	94
Jason Heyward	158	587	93	158	.269	27	82
Eric Hinske	91	132	9	26	.197	2	13
Paul Janish	55	167	18	31	.186	0	9
Reed Johnson	43	100	7	27	.270	0	4
Chipper Jones	112	387	58	111	.287	14	62
Brian McCann	121	439	44	101	.230	20	67
Lyle Overbay	20	20	1	2	.100	0	0
Tyler Pastornicky	76	169	21	41	.243	2	13
Martin Prado	156	617	81	186	.301	10	70
David Ross	62	176	18	45	.256	9	23
Andrelton Simmons	49	166	17	48	.289	3	19
Dan Uggla	154	523	86	115	.220	19	78
Jack Wilson	40	71	4	12	.169	0	4
Pitcher totals	162	302	20	35	.116	0	13
Team totals	162	5425	700	1341	.247	149	660

Complete batting stats can be found here.

=== Pitching ===
==== Starting pitchers ====
Note: G = Games pitched; GS = Games started; IP = Innings pitched; W = Wins; L = Losses; ERA = Earned run average; SO = Strikeouts; WHIP = Walks and hits per innings pitched

Player	G	GS	IP	W	L	ERA	SO	WHIP
Brandon Beachy	13	13	81	5	5	2.00	68	0.96
Randall Delgado (1 hold)	18	17	92 2/3	4	9	4.37	76	1.41
Tommy Hanson	31	31	174 2/3	13	10	4.48	161	1.45
Tim Hudson	28	28	179	16	7	3.62	102	1.21
Jair Jurrjens	11	10	48 1/3	3	4	6.89	19	1.86
Paul Maholm	11	11	68 2/3	4	5	3.54	59	1.19
Kris Medlen (7 holds)	50	12	138	10	1	1.57	120	0.91
Mike Minor	30	30	179 1/3	11	10	4.12	145	1.15
Ben Sheets	9	9	49 1/3	4	4	3.47	35	1.32
Julio Teherán (1 hold)	2	1	6 1/3	0	0	5.68	5	0.95

==== Relief pitchers ====
Note: G = Games pitched; W = Wins; L = Losses; SV = Saves; HLD = Holds; IP = Innings pitched; ERA = Earned run average; SO = Strikeouts; WHIP = Walks and hits per inning pitched

Player	G	W	L	SV	HLD	IP	ERA	SO	WHIP
Luis Avilán	31	1	0	0	5	36.0	2.00	33	1.03
Miguel Batista	5	0	0	0	0	6.0	3.00	2	1.17
Chad Durbin	76	4	1	1	15	61.0	3.10	49	1.31
Cory Gearrin	22	0	1	0	4	20.0	1.80	20	1.10
Liván Hernández	18	1	1	1	0	31.0	4.94	19	1.55
Craig Kimbrel	63	3	1	42	0	62 2/3	1.01	116	0.65
Cristhian Martínez	54	5	4	1	1	73 2/3	3.91	65	1.34
Peter Moylan	8	1	0	1	1	5.0	1.80	2	1.00
Eric O'Flaherty	64	3	0	0	28	57 1/3	1.73	46	1.15
Anthony Varvaro	12	1	1	0	0	16 2/3	5.40	21	1.50
Jonny Venters	66	5	4	0	20	58 2/3	3.22	69	1.52
Team Pitching Totals	162	94	68	47	83	1445 1/3	3.42	1232	1.23

Complete pitching stats can be found here.

== Farm system ==
Level	Team	League	Manager
AAA	Gwinnett Braves	International League	Dave Brundage
AA	Mississippi Braves	Southern League	Aaron Holbert
A	Lynchburg Hillcats	Carolina League	Luis Salazar
A	Rome Braves	South Atlantic League	Randy Ingle
Rookie	Danville Braves	Appalachian League	Jonathan Schuerholz
Rookie	GCL Braves	Gulf Coast League	Rocket Wheeler

LEAGUE CHAMPIONS: Lynchburg
