= List of Atlanta Braves Opening Day starting pitchers =

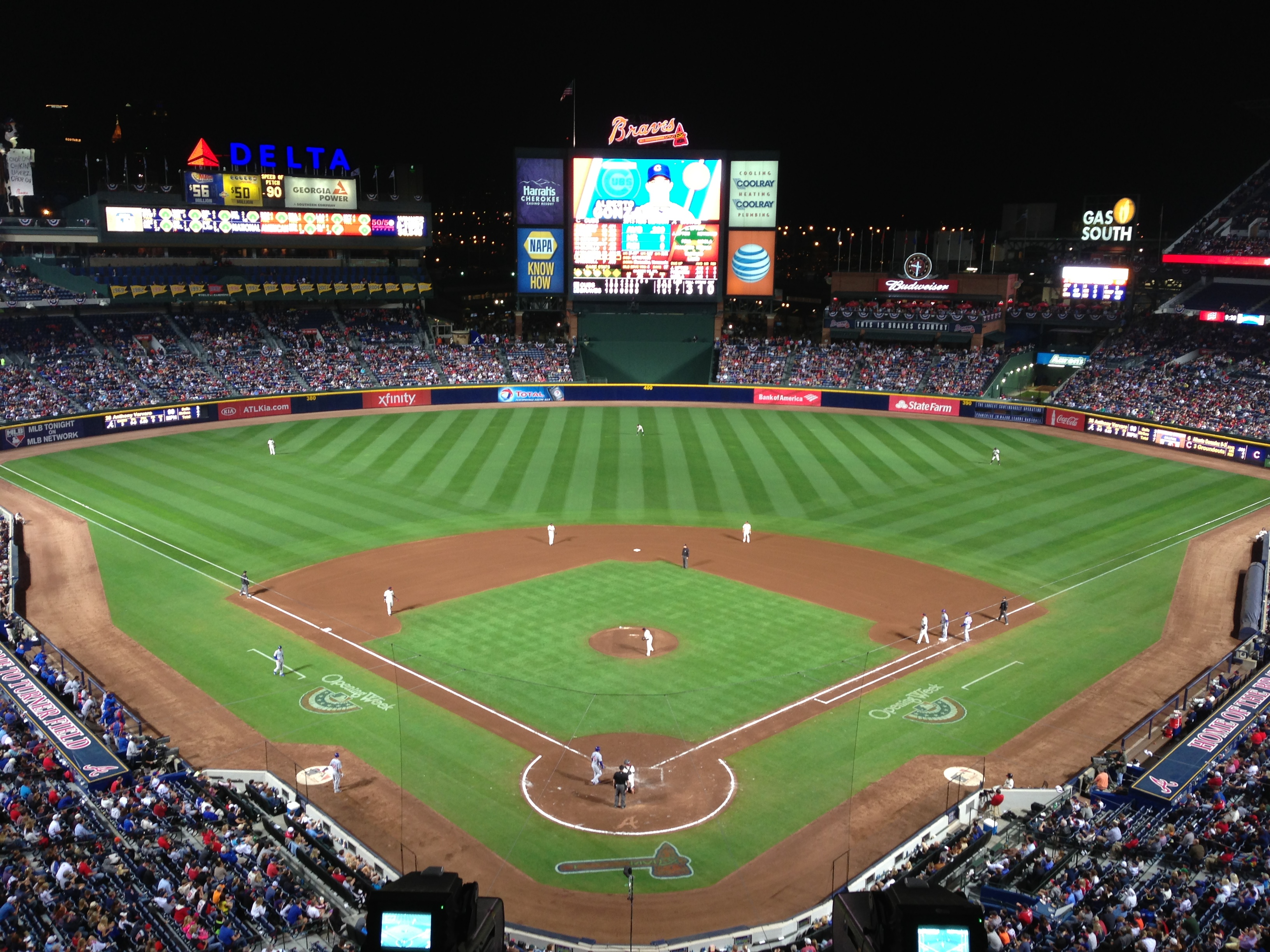
The Braves played nine Opening Day games at Turner Field, their home stadium from 1997 through 2016.

The Atlanta Braves are a Major League Baseball (MLB) franchise based in Atlanta. They play in the National League East division. They were based in Milwaukee and Boston before moving to Atlanta for the 1966 season. The first game of the new baseball season for a team is played on Opening Day, and being named the Opening Day starter is an honor, which is often given to the player who is expected to lead the pitching staff that season, though there are various strategic reasons why a team's best pitcher might not start on Opening Day. The Atlanta Braves have used 24 different Opening Day starting pitchers in their 60 seasons in Atlanta. The 24 starters have a combined Opening Day record of 16 wins, 23 losses and 21 no decisions. No decisions are only awarded to the starting pitcher if the game is won or lost after the starting pitcher has left the game.

Hall of Famer Phil Niekro holds the Atlanta Braves' record for most Opening Day starts, with eight. Greg Maddux had seven for the team and Julio Teherán was featured six consecutive times from 2014 to 2019. Rick Mahler had five while Tom Glavine and John Smoltz have each made four Opening Day starts for the Braves. Maddux has the record for most wins in Atlanta Braves Opening Day starts, with five. Mahler has the highest winning percentage in Opening Day starts (1.000), with four wins and no losses with one no decision. All of Mahler's four victories were shutouts, including three in consecutive years (1985 to 1987) by identical scores of 6–0. Niekro has the record for most losses in Atlanta Braves Opening Day starts, with six.

From 1972 through 1980, the Braves lost nine consecutive Opening Day games. In those games, their starting pitchers had a record of no wins, six losses and three no decisions. Niekro had five of the losses during this streak, and Carl Morton had the other. Morton, Gary Gentry and Andy Messersmith had no decisions during the streak. One of the most famous Opening Day games in baseball history occurred during this stretch. That was the game on April 4, 1974, against the Cincinnati Reds at Riverfront Stadium, when Hank Aaron hit his 714th career home run to tie Babe Ruth's all-time record. Carl Morton was Atlanta's starting pitcher for that game, and received a no decision.

Overall, Atlanta Braves Opening Day starting pitchers have a record of 4–5 with four no decisions at Atlanta–Fulton County Stadium, their original home ball park in Atlanta. They have a 3–3 record with three no decisions at their second home park in Atlanta, Turner Field. At their current home park of Truist Park, originally named SunTrust Park, they have a 0–1 record with one no decision. This gives the Atlanta Braves' Opening Day starting pitchers a combined home record 7–9 with eight no decisions. Their away record is 8–14 with eleven no decisions. The Braves went on to play in the World Series in 1991, 1992, 1995, 1996, 1999 and 2021, winning the 1995 and 2021 iterations. John Smoltz was the Opening Day starting pitcher in 1991, Tom Glavine in 1992 and 1999, Greg Maddux in 1995 and 1996, and Max Fried in 2021. They have a combined Opening Day record of 3–2 in years that the Atlanta Braves played in the World Series.

== Key ==
Season	Each year is linked to an article about that particular Braves season.
W	Win
L	Loss
ND (W)	No decision by starting pitcher; Braves won game
ND (L)	No decision by starting pitcher; Braves lost game
Final; Score	Game score with Braves runs listed first
Location	Stadium in italics for home game
Pitcher (#)	Number of appearances as Opening Day starter with the Braves
*	Advanced to the post-season
**	Won National League Championship Series
†	Won World Series

== Pitchers ==
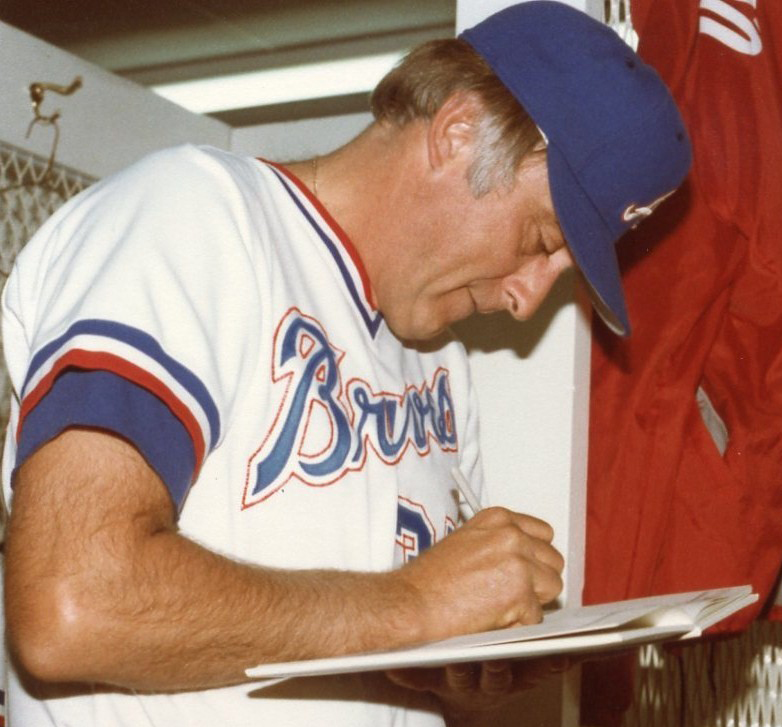
Phil Niekro was the Braves' Opening Day starting pitcher eight times, more than any other pitcher

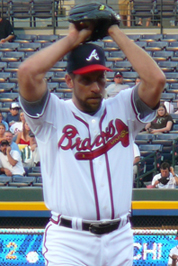
John Smoltz has made four Opening Day starts for the Braves.

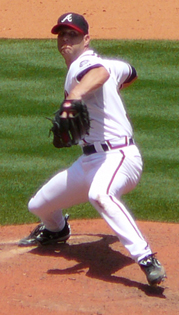
Tim Hudson was the Braves' 2013 Opening Day starting pitcher. Hudson also started in 2006 and 2008.

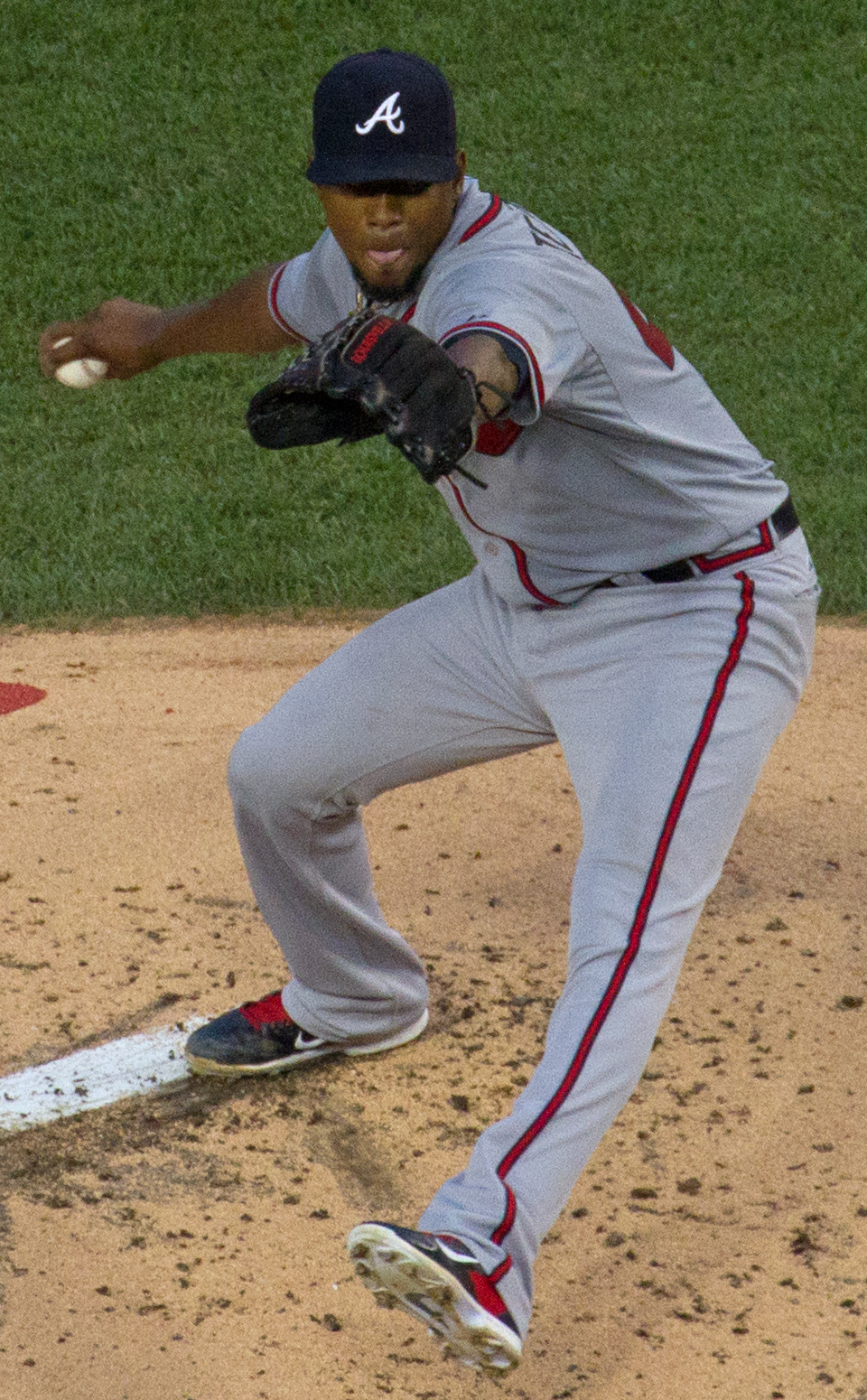
Julio Teherán was the Braves' Opening Day starting pitcher from 2014 to 2019.

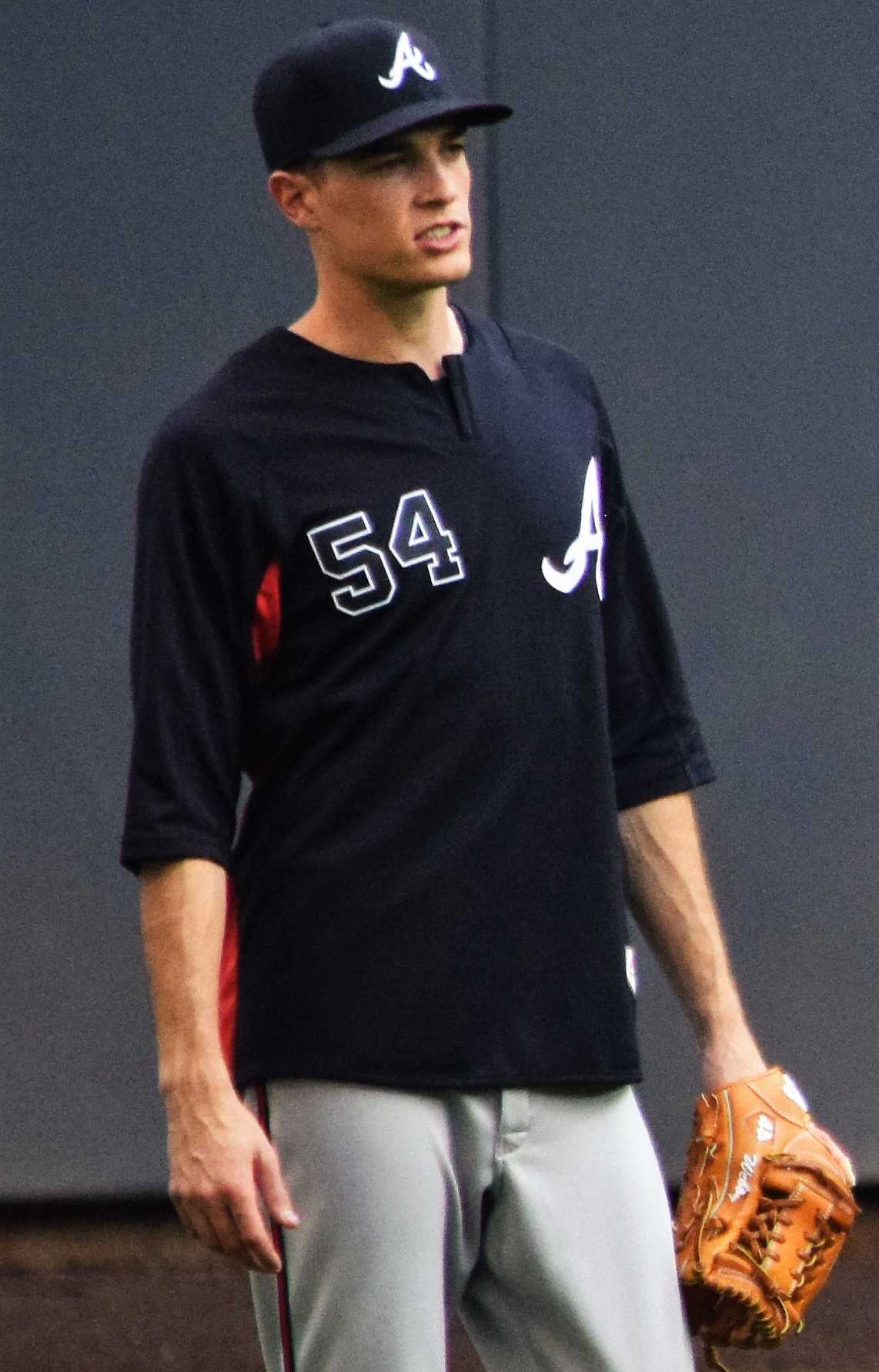
Max Fried

Season	Pitcher	Decision	Final score	Opponent	Location	Ref(s)
1966	Tony Cloninger^{[a]}	L	2–3	Pittsburgh Pirates	Atlanta–Fulton County Stadium	
1967	Denny Lemaster	L	1–6	Houston Astros	Astrodome	
1968	Pat Jarvis	L	1–2	St. Louis Cardinals	Busch Stadium	
1969*	Pat Jarvis (2)	ND (W)	5–4	San Francisco Giants	Atlanta–Fulton County Stadium	
1970	Phil Niekro	L	3–8	San Diego Padres	San Diego Stadium	
1971	Phil Niekro (2)	ND (W)	7–4	Cincinnati Reds	Riverfront Stadium	
1972	Phil Niekro (3)	L	5–6	San Diego Padres	San Diego Stadium	
1973	Gary Gentry	ND (L)	1–2	Houston Astros	Atlanta–Fulton County Stadium	
1974	Carl Morton	ND (L)	6–7	Cincinnati Reds	Riverfront Stadium	
1975	Phil Niekro (4)	L	2–6	Houston Astros	Astrodome	
1976	Carl Morton (2)	L	2–8	San Diego Padres	San Diego Stadium	
1977	Andy Messersmith	ND (L)	2–3	Houston Astros	Astrodome	
1978	Phil Niekro (5)	L	4–13	Los Angeles Dodgers	Atlanta–Fulton County Stadium	
1979	Phil Niekro (6)	L	1–2	Houston Astros	Astrodome	
1980	Phil Niekro (7)	L	0–9	Cincinnati Reds	Riverfront Stadium	
1981	Tommy Boggs	ND (W)	5–3	Cincinnati Reds	Atlanta–Fulton County Stadium	
1982*	Rick Mahler	W	1–0	San Diego Padres	Jack Murphy Stadium	
1983	Phil Niekro (8)	ND (L)	4–5	Cincinnati Reds	Riverfront Stadium	
1984	Len Barker	L	0–5	Philadelphia Phillies	Atlanta–Fulton County Stadium	
1985	Rick Mahler (2)	W	6–0	Philadelphia Phillies	Veterans Stadium	
1986	Rick Mahler (3)	W	6–0	Montreal Expos	Atlanta–Fulton County Stadium	
1987	Rick Mahler (4)	W	6–0	Philadelphia Phillies	Atlanta–Fulton County Stadium	
1988	Rick Mahler (5)	ND (L)	9–10	Chicago Cubs	Atlanta–Fulton County Stadium	
1989	Zane Smith	L	10–3	Houston Astros	Astrodome	
1990	Tom Glavine	L	0–8	San Francisco Giants	Atlanta–Fulton County Stadium	
1991**	John Smoltz	L	4–6	Los Angeles Dodgers	Atlanta–Fulton County Stadium	
1992**	Tom Glavine (2)	W	2–0	Houston Astros	Astrodome	
1993*	Greg Maddux	W	1–0	Chicago Cubs	Wrigley Field	
1994	Greg Maddux (2)	W	4–1	San Diego Padres	Jack Murphy Stadium	
1995†	Greg Maddux (3)	W	12–5	San Francisco Giants	Atlanta–Fulton County Stadium	
1996**	Greg Maddux (4)	W	10–8	San Francisco Giants	Atlanta–Fulton County Stadium	
1997*	John Smoltz (2)	L	1–2	Houston Astros	Astrodome	
1998*	Greg Maddux (5)	ND (W)	2–1	Milwaukee Brewers	Turner Field	
1999**	Tom Glavine (3)	L	4–7	Philadelphia Phillies	Turner Field	
2000*	Greg Maddux (6)	W	2–0	Colorado Rockies	Turner Field	
2001*	John Burkett	ND (W)	10–4	Cincinnati Reds	Cinergy Field	
2002*	Tom Glavine (4)	W	7–2	Philadelphia Phillies	Turner Field	
2003*	Greg Maddux (7)	L	2–10	Montreal Expos	Turner Field	
2004*	Russ Ortiz	L	2–7	New York Mets	Turner Field	
2005*	John Smoltz (3)	L	0–9	Florida Marlins	Dolphin Stadium	
2006	Tim Hudson	ND (W)	11–10	Los Angeles Dodgers	Dodger Stadium	
2007	John Smoltz (4)	ND (W)	5–3	Philadelphia Phillies	Citizens Bank Park	
2008	Tim Hudson (2)	ND (L)	2–3	Washington Nationals	Nationals Park	
2009	Derek Lowe	W	4–1	Philadelphia Phillies	Citizens Bank Park	
2010*	Derek Lowe (2)	W	16–5	Chicago Cubs	Turner Field	
2011	Derek Lowe (3)	W	2–0	Washington Nationals	Nationals Park	
2012	Tommy Hanson	L	0–1	New York Mets	Citi Field	
2013*	Tim Hudson (3)	ND (W)	7–5	Philadelphia Phillies	Turner Field	
2014	Julio Teherán	L	0–2	Milwaukee Brewers	Miller Park	
2015	Julio Teherán (2)	W	2–1	Miami Marlins	Marlins Park	
2016	Julio Teherán (3)	ND (L)	3–4	Washington Nationals	Turner Field	
2017	Julio Teherán (4)	ND (L)	0–6	New York Mets	Citi Field	
2018*	Julio Teherán (5)	ND (W)	8–5	Philadelphia Phillies	SunTrust Park	
2019*	Julio Teherán (6)	L	4–10	Philadelphia Phillies	Citizens Bank Park	
2020*	Michael Soroka	ND (L)	0–1	New York Mets	Citi Field	
2021†	Max Fried	ND (L)	2–3	Philadelphia Phillies	Citizens Bank Park	
2022*	Max Fried (2)	L	3–6	Cincinnati Reds	Truist Park	
2023*	Max Fried (3)	ND (W)	7–2	Washington Nationals	Nationals Park	
2024*	Spencer Strider	ND (W)	9–3	Philadelphia Phillies	Citizens Bank Park	
2025	Chris Sale	ND (L)	4–7	San Diego Padres	Petco Park	
2026*	Chris Sale (2)	W	6–0	Kansas City Royals	Truist Park	

== Footnotes ==
- ^{a} Tony Cloninger had one Opening Day start for the Atlanta Braves in 1966. He also had one Opening Day start for the Milwaukee Braves in 1965, giving him a total of two Opening Day starts for the Braves' franchise.
