= Juan Francisco =

Dominican baseball player (born 1987)

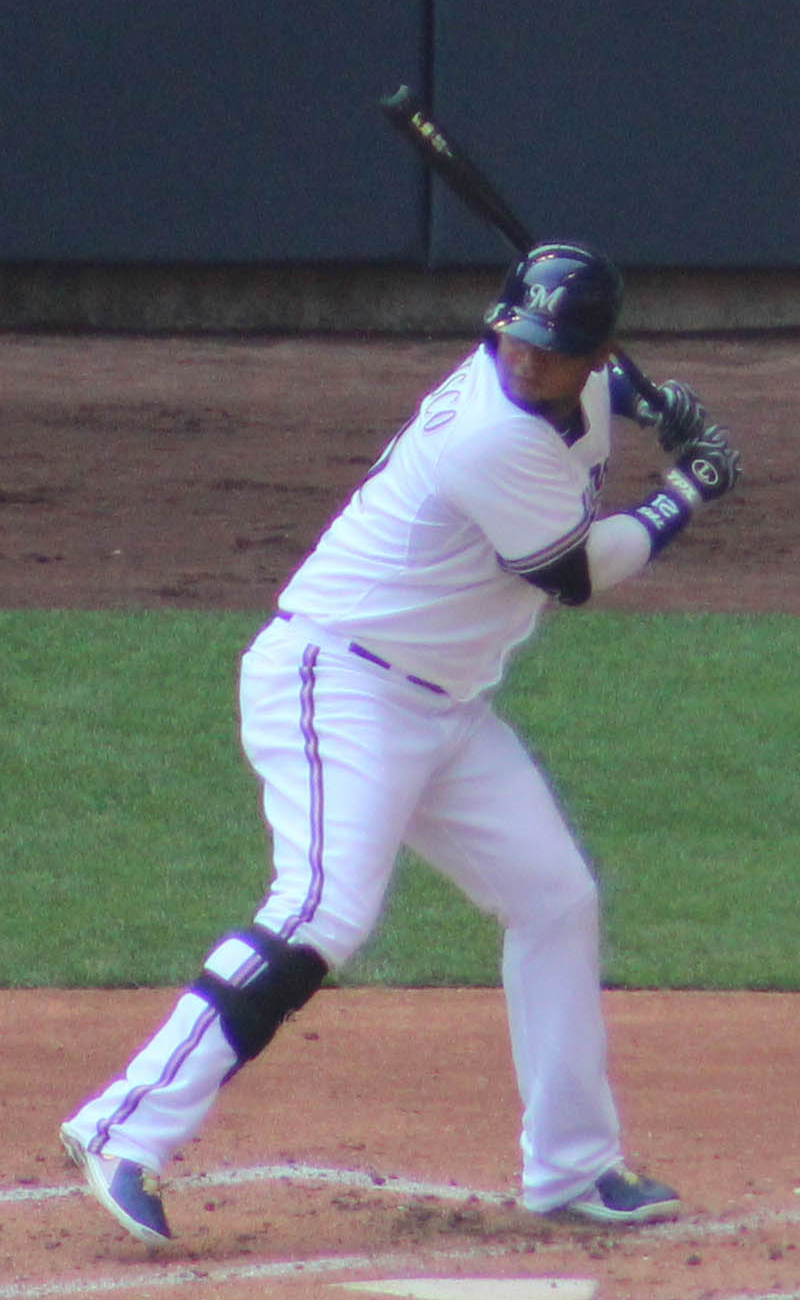
- Francisco in 2013 with the Milwaukee Brewers

Leones del Escogido
- First baseman / Mental health coach
- Born: June 24, 1987 (age 39); Bonao, Dominican Republic
- Batted: Left Threw: Right

Professional debut
- MLB: September 14, 2009, for the Cincinnati Reds
- NPB: May 2, 2015, for the Yomiuri Giants

Last appearance
- MLB: September 28, 2014, for the Toronto Blue Jays
- NPB: May 6, 2015, for the Yomiuri Giants

MLB statistics
- Batting average: .236
- Home runs: 48
- Runs batted in: 152

NPB statistics
- Batting average: .167
- Home runs: 0
- Runs batted in: 1
- Stats at Baseball Reference

Teams
- Cincinnati Reds (2009–2011); Atlanta Braves (2012–2013); Milwaukee Brewers (2013); Toronto Blue Jays (2014); Yomiuri Giants (2015)
Medals
Men's baseball
Representing Dominican Republic
Olympic Games
Bronze medal – third place	2020 Tokyo	Team

Juan Ramón Francisco González (born June 24, 1987) is a Dominican former professional baseball first baseman. He played in Major League Baseball (MLB) for the Cincinnati Reds, Atlanta Braves, Milwaukee Brewers, and Toronto Blue Jays. He also played in Nippon Professional Baseball (NPB) for the Yomiuri Giants.

== Professional career ==
=== Cincinnati Reds ===
Francisco spent his first professional season, with the Gulf Coast League Reds. He batted .280 in 182 at-bats with three home runs, and enjoyed a nine-game call up at the season's end to the rookie–level Billings Mustangs, where he went 12-for-36 (.333).

Francisco spent 2007 with the single-A Dayton Dragons. He hit .268 in 534 at-bats, slugging 25 home runs and driving in 90. Juan was a Midwest League mid-season All-Star and post-season All-Star for the Dragons.

Promoted again in 2008, this time to the High–A Sarasota Reds, he again spent the entire season with the same team. In 516 at-bats, he hit .277 with 23 homers and 92 RBI. Francisco earned All-Star status again, for both the mid-season and post-season in the Florida State League. In addition, he was selected to play in the 2008 Major League Baseball All-Star Futures Game. Francisco was named Reds' Minor League Hitter of the Year for 2008. Juan played winter ball for Gigantes del Cibao of the Dominican Winter Baseball League. In 40 games for the team, he .360 with 37 RBI, and his 12 home runs set the DWL record for regular season homers by a left-handed hitter. He continued to produce in the playoffs, hitting six more homers and 18 more RBI. His performance earned him the DWL Rookie of the Year accolade. On November 20, 2008, Reds added Francisco to their 40-man roster to protect him from the Rule 5 draft. Originally a switch-hitter, Francisco abandoned hitting right-handed in 2009 to become a full-time lefty.

Juan began the year in Double–A Carolina. He played in 109 games for the Mudcats, where he hit .281 with 22 home runs and 78 RBI in 437 at-bats. For the third year in a row he earned mid- and post-season All-Star recognition, this time in the Southern League. He was promoted to the Triple–A Louisville Bats. He played in 22 games, getting 92 at-bats, and hit .359 with 5 homers and 19 RBI. Juan again earned a promotion, this time to the Cincinnati Reds.

Francisco made his debut for the Reds as part of a 3–1 win over the Houston Astros on September 14, 2009, at Great American Ball Park. Pinch hitting for left fielder Darnell McDonald in the seventh inning, Francisco faced pitcher Jeff Fulchino and struck out in his first Major League at bat. He finished his September call-up batting .429 (9-for-21) with his first career big-league homer and seven RBI.

Francisco was again named Minor League Hitter of the Year, and Baseball America rated him the organization's best power hitter and best infield arm. He headed back to the Gigantes for the 2009–10 DWL season. He played in 46 games this time, batting .302 with 11 doubles, 11 homers, and 42 RBI. The Gigantes were runners-up in the playoffs, and in 22 games of post-season play he hit 3 home runs with 18 RBI. This performance earned him the title of 2009 DWL Most Valuable Player.

Francisco spent 2010 mainly with the Louisville Bats. Ironically, in his best statistical season to date, he was not named to any All-Star roster for the first time in four years. For the Bats, he played in 77 games and hit .286 in 308 at-bats, slugging 18 homers and 59 RBI in his shortened season. He spent the rest of the season with the Reds, and saw action in 36 games. He hit .273 with one homer and seven RBI in 55 at-bats.

He played winter ball with Cibao again, and continued to be one of the top players. In 39 games and 152 at-bats, he hit .322 with 8 homers and 30 RBI. They lost in the championship game again, but this time without Francisco, who fouled a pitch off his leg under his right knee on December 10 and missed the rest of the season. He was hospitalized when it became infected and inflamed and the knee had to be drained, but Walt Jocketty, Reds GM, said that it was nothing serious. Despite missing part of the season, Francisco won his second consecutive DWL MVP award. This and his other trips to the DWL playoffs, which are taken very seriously in the Dominican Republic, have given Juan post-season experience which he can bring with him to the big leagues.

Francisco made the club out of spring training in 2011 as a backup to Scott Rolen, backup left fielder, and a left-handed bat off the bench. He switched his number from 64 to the more conventional number 25. On September 12, 2011, Francisco hit a home run off Chicago Cubs pitcher Rodrigo López that cleared the right field bleachers at Great American Ball Park. It was estimated to have gone 502 feet. It was the second longest home run in Great American Ballpark history behind Adam Dunn's 535 ft home run in 2004.

=== Atlanta Braves ===
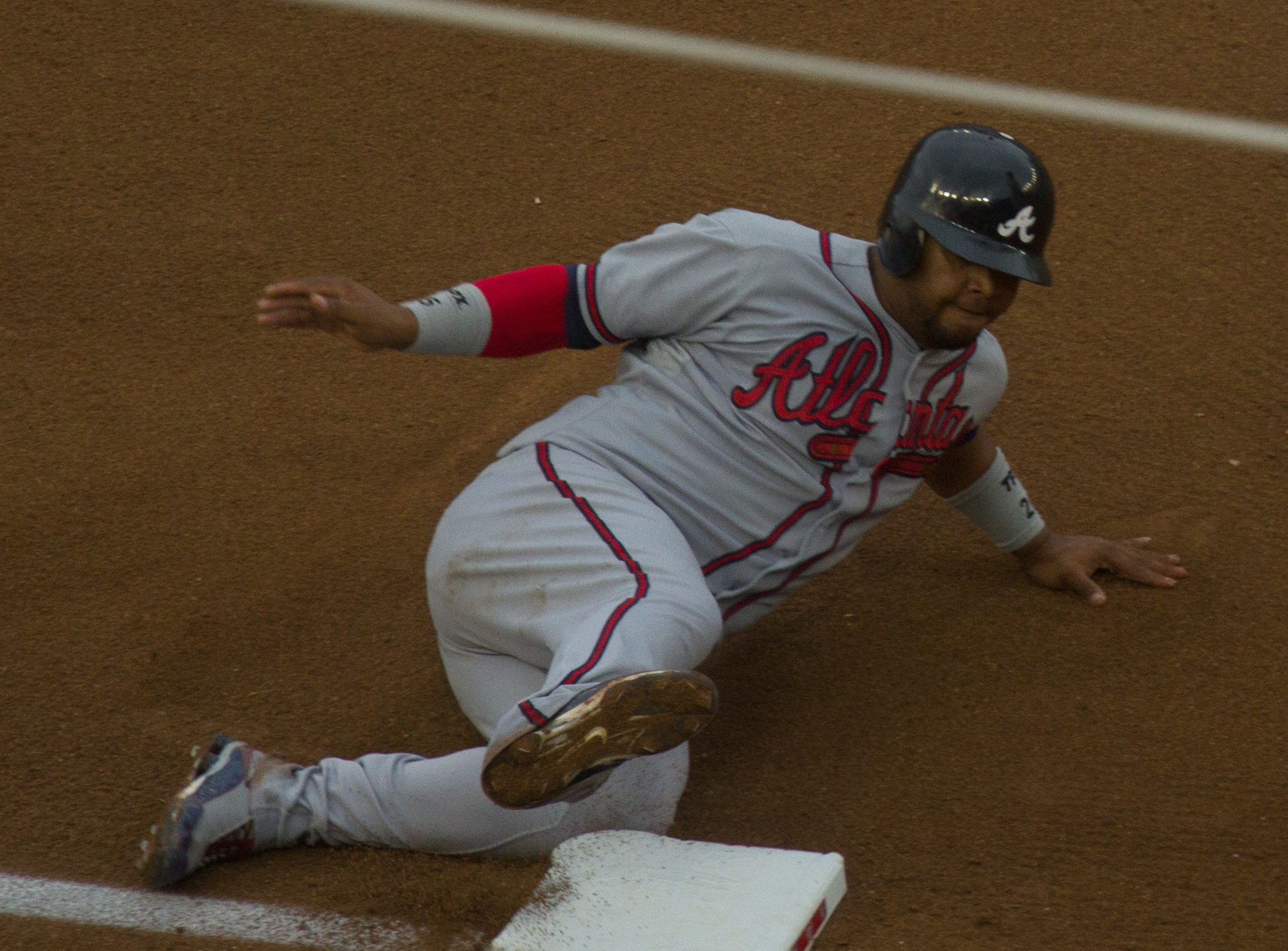
Francisco playing for the Atlanta Braves in 2012

On April 1, 2012, Francisco was traded to the Atlanta Braves in exchange for pitcher J. J. Hoover. His debut for the Braves came at third base on April 7, 2012, against the New York Mets.

Francisco entered 2013 as the replacement for the recently retired Chipper Jones at third base, along with Chris Johnson. On April 16, 2013, Francisco had his first career multi-homer game in a 6–3 win over the Kansas City Royals. On May 8, Francisco hit his first career grand slam against Reds pitcher J. J. Hoover (who he had been traded for). Francisco was designated for assignment by the Braves on May 30 to make room on the roster for Alex Wood. At that point, Johnson won the starting third base job for himself. In 35 games with Atlanta, Francisco hit .241/.287/.398 with 5 HR and 16 RBI.

=== Milwaukee Brewers ===
On June 3, 2013, Francisco was traded by the Braves to the Milwaukee Brewers for minor league pitcher Tom Keeling. He split first base duties with Yuniesky Betancourt until around mid-August, when Jonathan Lucroy and Sean Halton got more starts, with Francisco getting the smallest third, being used more often as a pinch-hitter. In 124 total games, he hit .227/.296/.412 with 18 HR and 48 RBI. He was released on March 24, 2014.

=== Toronto Blue Jays ===
On April 1, 2014, the Toronto Blue Jays signed Francisco to a minor league contract, and assigned him to the Triple-A Buffalo Bisons. His contract was purchased by the Blue Jays on April 19, when Maicer Izturis was transferred to the 60-day disabled list, and he made his Blue Jays debut that day as the designated hitter. Francisco enjoyed early success as a member of the Blue Jays, but his inability to hit the breaking ball reduced his effectiveness, and then his playing time. He finished the 2014 season batting .220 with 16 home runs and 43 RBI, but struck out 116 times in 287 at-bats.

=== Tampa Bay Rays ===
On November 19, 2014, Francisco was claimed off waivers by the Boston Red Sox. He was designated for assignment on November 25, but was non-tendered and became a free agent.

On January 10, 2015, Francisco signed a minor league deal with the Tampa Bay Rays. After failing to make the 25-man roster out of spring training, Tampa Bay attempted to send Francisco to Triple-A Durham Bulls, however he exercised an opt-out clause in his contract on April 5 and became a free agent.

=== Yomiuri Giants ===
On April 21, 2015, Francisco signed with the Yomiuri Giants of Nippon Professional Baseball. His NPB debut against the Hanshin Tigers took place on May 2. Francisco hit an RBI single that helped the Giants win a 1–0 shutout.

=== Baltimore Orioles ===
After sitting out the 2016 season, Francisco signed a minor league contract with the Baltimore Orioles on February 14, 2017. He did not appear in a game for the organization and was released by the Orioles on May 16.

=== Leones de Yucatán ===
On June 6, 2017, Francisco signed with the Leones de Yucatán of the Mexican League. In 41 games for Yucatán, he slashed .277/.330/.465 with seven home runs and 30 RBI.

=== Guerreros de Oaxaca ===
On January 31, 2020, Francisco signed with the Guerreros de Oaxaca of the Mexican League. He did not play in a game for the team due to the cancellation of the season as a result of the COVID-19 pandemic. Francisco was released by Oaxaca on June 5.
