= Cristhian Martínez =

Dominican baseball player (born 1982)

- Pitcher
- Born: March 6, 1982 (age 44); Santo Domingo, Dominican Republic
- Batted: Right Threw: Right

MLB debut
- May 21, 2009, for the Florida Marlins

Last MLB appearance
- April 6, 2013, for the Atlanta Braves

MLB statistics
- Win–loss record: 7–8
- Earned run average: 4.02
- Strikeouts: 163
- Stats at Baseball Reference

Teams
- Florida Marlins (2009); Atlanta Braves (2010–2013)

Cristhian A. Martínez Mercedes (born March 6, 1982) is a Dominican former professional baseball pitcher. He played in Major League Baseball (MLB) for the Florida Marlins and Atlanta Braves.

== Career ==
=== Detroit Tigers ===
Martínez signed as an international free agent with the Detroit Tigers in 2003. He played within the Tigers' minor league system until the end of the 2006 season, making appearances for the Gulf Coast Tigers, Oneonta Tigers, West Michigan White Caps, and Lakeland Tigers. He did not advance beyond the Single-A level during his time with the organization.

=== Florida Marlins ===
On December 7, 2006, the Florida Marlins selected Martínez in the minor league phase of the Rule 5 draft.

Martínez made his Major League debut on May 21, 2009, with the Marlins. He recorded his first MLB win on June 1, 2009, after pitching 1 2/3 scoreless innings in relief against the Milwaukee Brewers. He was optioned to the Triple-A New Orleans Zephyrs immediately after that game. In total, he appeared in 15 games during the 2009 season, posting a 1–1 record with a 5.13 earned run average (ERA).

On April 3, 2010, the Marlins designated Martínez for assignment.

=== Atlanta Braves ===
Martínez was claimed off waivers by the Atlanta Braves on April 8, 2010. He was assigned to the Triple-A Gwinnett Braves and appeared in 23 games before receiving a call-up to the Major League roster in early September.

Following his Super Two arbitration eligibility, Martínez agreed to a one-year, $750,000 contract with the Braves on January 18, 2013. On April 12, he was placed on the disabled list with a shoulder strain, creating roster space for recently acquired reliever Luis Ayala.

Martínez made two appearances in the 2013 season, allowing two runs in his first outing against the Philadelphia Phillies and pitching two scoreless innings against the Chicago Cubs on April 6. On July 9, he underwent shoulder surgery and was ruled out for the remainder of the season. He also missed the entire 2014 season due to the injury.

On December 2, 2013, Martínez was non-tendered by the Braves, along with shortstop Paul Janish and infielder Elliot Johnson, making all three free agents.

== Coaching Career ==
In 2025, Martínez was named as pitching coach for the DSL Mets Blue the Dominican Summer League affiliate of the New York Mets for the 2025 season.

== See also ==
- Rule 5 draft results
