= J. C. Boscán =

Venezuelan baseball player (born 1979)

J.C. Boscán
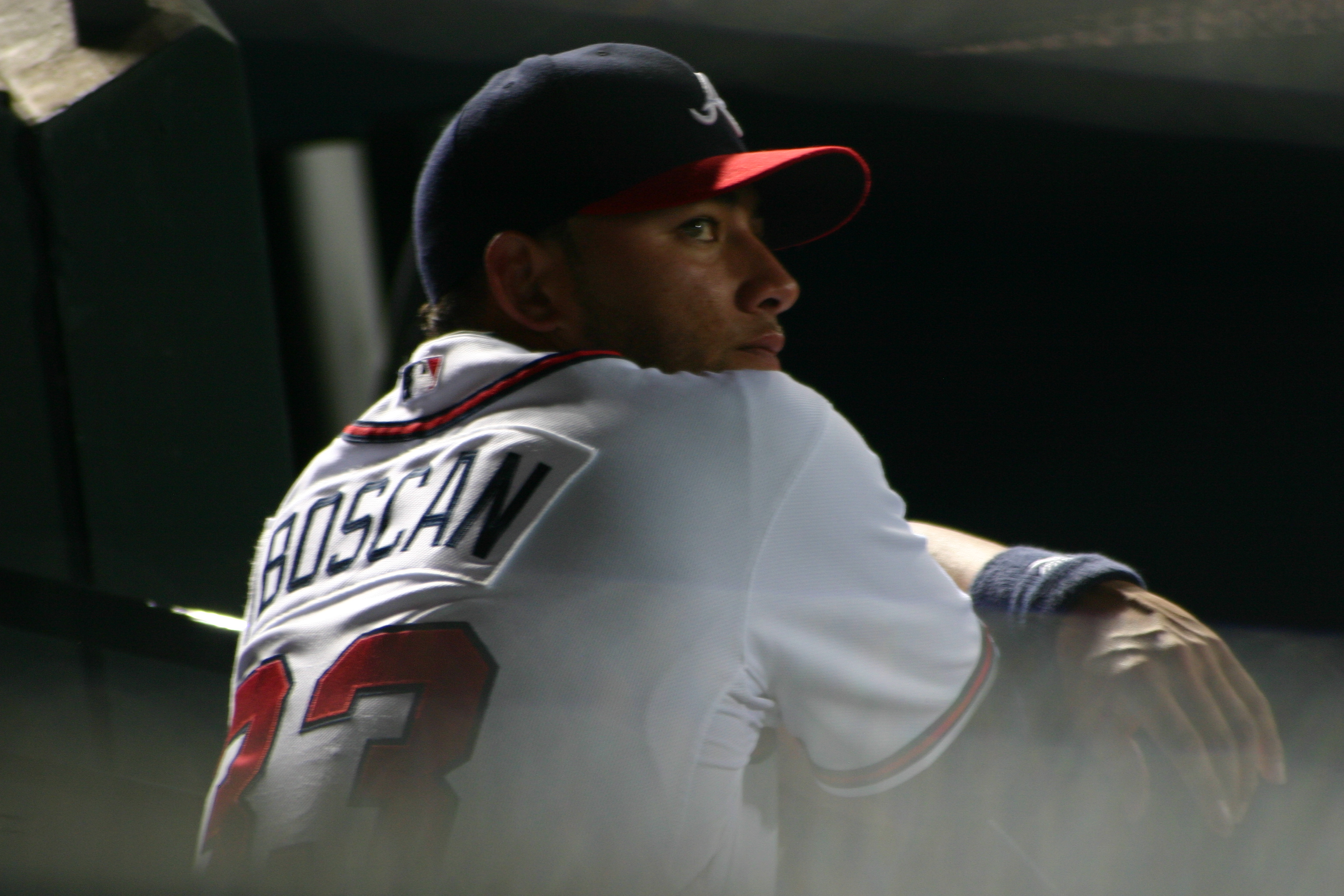
- Boscán with the Atlanta Braves
- Catcher
- Born: December 26, 1979 (age 46); Maracaibo, Venezuela
- Batted: Right Threw: Right

MLB debut
- October 1, 2010, for the Atlanta Braves

Last MLB appearance
- September 29, 2013, for the Chicago Cubs

MLB statistics
- Batting average: .250
- Home runs: 0
- Runs batted in: 2
- Stats at Baseball Reference

Teams
- Atlanta Braves (2010–2012); Chicago Cubs (2013)

Jean Carlos Boscán (born December 26, 1979) is a Venezuelan former professional baseball catcher who played in Major League Baseball (MLB) for the Atlanta Braves and Chicago Cubs.

== Professional career ==
=== Atlanta Braves ===
Boscan was signed as an amateur free agent by the Atlanta Braves on July 2, 1996. He began his professional career in 1997 with the GCL Braves, with whom he hit .202 in 36 games. He played for the Danville Braves in 1998, hitting .218 in 51 games. In 105 games with the Macon Braves in 1999, Boscan hit .226 with a career-high 38 RBI, as well as a career-high 40 runs scored. He spent 2000 with Macon as well, hitting .205 in 93 games. He hit a career-high nine home runs that season.

Boscan split the 2001 season between Macon and the Myrtle Beach Pelicans, hitting a combined .260 in 61 games. He split 2002 between the Pelicans, Greenville Braves and Richmond Braves, hitting a combined .220 in 98 games. In 2003, he hit .197 in 72 games split between the Myrtle Beach, Richmond and Greenville. He also played for the Richmond and Greenville in 2004, hitting .246 in 74 games total. In 2005 with Richmond, Boscan hit .222 in 72 games.

=== Milwaukee Brewers ===
A free agent after the 2005 season, he signed a minor league contract with the Milwaukee Brewers organization in 2006, hitting .197 in 45 games split between the Huntsville Stars and Nashville Sounds.

=== Cincinnati Reds ===
Boscan signed a minor league contract with Cincinnati Reds organization on January 8, 2007. He hit .215 in 30 games with the Chattanooga Lookouts and 8 games with the Louisville Bats.

=== Atlanta Braves ===
Boscan returned to the Braves organization in 2008 and hit .235 in 79 games with the Mississippi Braves. He split 2009 between the Mississippi and the Gwinnett Braves, hitting .259 in 86 games. He began the 2010 season with Gwinnett, hitting .250 in 66 games prior to his September 1, 2010 promotion to the major leagues. He made his major league debut October 1. He walked to load the bases in his first major league plate appearance during the ninth inning against the Philadelphia Phillies and scored on a double by Derrek Lee, who was the next batter. That was his only plate appearance of the season.

Boscán was released by the Braves on October 19, 2010, but quickly re-signed a minor league contract with an invitation to spring training. He played in 61 games with Gwinnett and hit .182. He also appeared in four games for the Braves in four different months and had three hits in nine at-bats. His first MLB hit was a single to right-field off Ricky Nolasco of the Florida Marlins on July 31, 2011. On November 2, Boscán was removed from the 40-man roster and sent outright to Gwinnett.

Boscan began the 2012 season back in Triple-A with Gwinnett, where he was hitting .192 in 32 games with two home runs and 12 RBI until May 26, when he was called up to Atlanta to replace Chipper Jones, who was placed on the 15-day DL. The Braves needed a catcher, as back-up catcher David Ross had injured his groin.

In 6 games in 2012, Boscan went 2–10 with 2 RBI. On November 1, he was outrighted off of the 40-man roster, where he then elected free agency.

=== Chicago Cubs ===
On November 21, 2012, Boscán signed a minor league deal with the Chicago Cubs. In 74 games with the Triple-A Iowa Cubs, he hit .232. Boscán was called up to the Cubs on September 3, 2013. He appeared in six games for the Cubs and had two hits in nine at-bats, with one double, his first MLB extra-base hit (a pinch hit double off Edward Mujica of the St. Louis Cardinals on September 28). Boscán was removed from the 40–man roster and sent outright to Triple–A Iowa on October 9.

=== Los Angeles Dodgers ===
Boscán signed a minor league contract with the Los Angeles Dodgers on November 12, 2013, and was assigned to the Double–A Chattanooga Lookouts. In 52 games, primarily as the backup catcher, he hit only .168.

=== Kansas City Royals ===
On January 16, 2015, Boscán signed a minor league contract with the Kansas City Royals organization. Boscán made 42 appearances for the Triple-A Omaha Storm Chasers, hitting .216/.260/.259 with 1 home run and 11 RBI. He elected free agency following the season on November 6, 2015.

On November 26, 2015, Boscán re–signed with the Royals on a new minor league contract.

== Coaching career ==
On January 16, 2026, Boscán was announced as a catching coordinator in the player development department of the Kansas City Royals.
