= Tommy Hanson =

American baseball player (1986–2015)

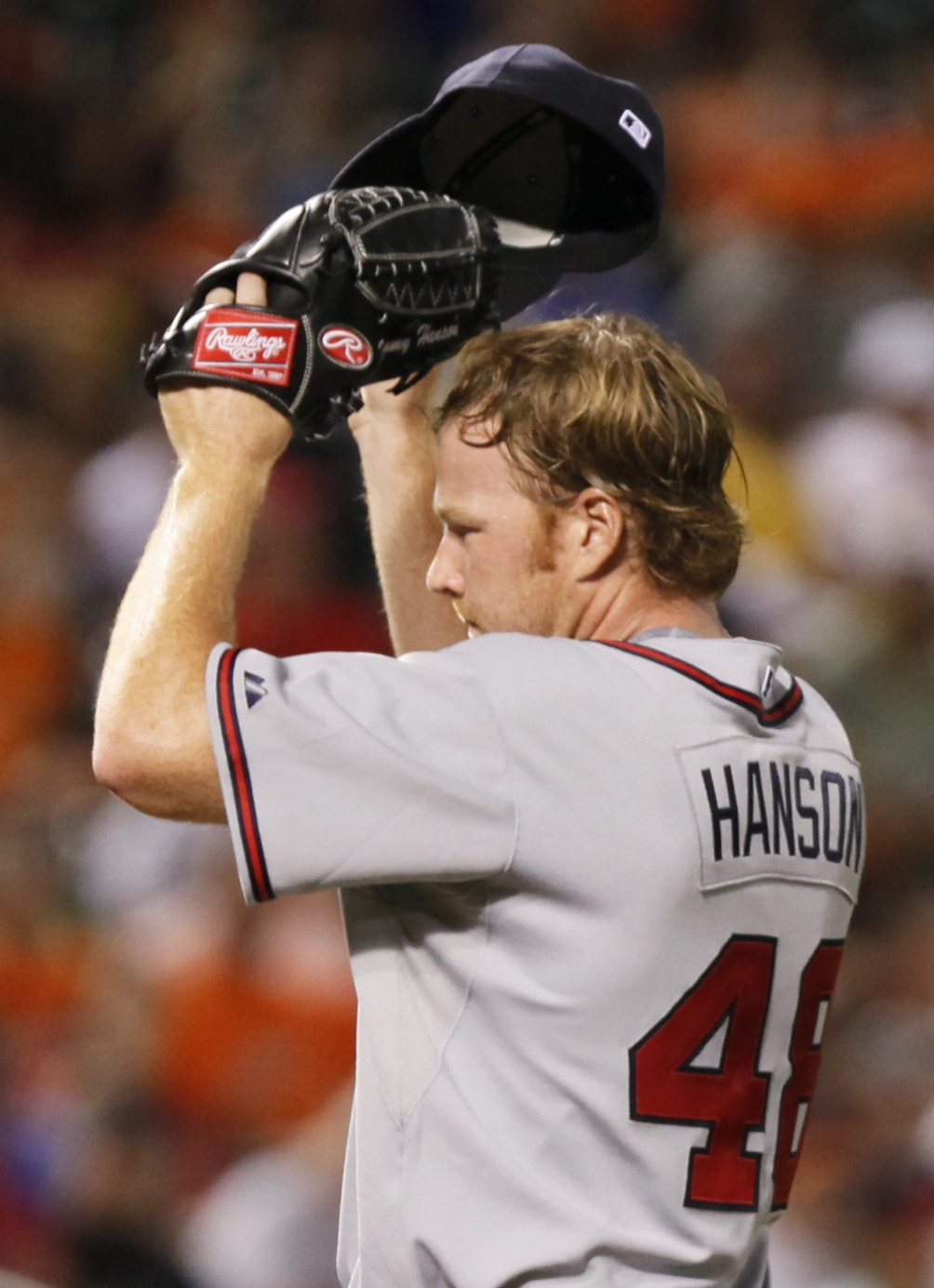
- Hanson with the Atlanta Braves in 2009
- Pitcher
- Born: August 28, 1986; Tulsa, Oklahoma, U.S.
- Died: November 9, 2015 (aged 29); Atlanta, Georgia, U.S.
- Batted: Right Threw: Right

MLB debut
- June 7, 2009, for the Atlanta Braves

Last MLB appearance
- September 28, 2013, for the Los Angeles Angels of Anaheim

MLB statistics
- Win–loss record: 49–35
- Earned run average: 3.80
- Strikeouts: 648
- Stats at Baseball Reference

Teams
- Atlanta Braves (2009–2012); Los Angeles Angels of Anaheim (2013)

Thomas J. Hanson Jr. (August 28, 1986 – November 9, 2015) was an American professional baseball pitcher in Major League Baseball (MLB). He played for the Atlanta Braves and Los Angeles Angels of Anaheim. Hanson made his MLB debut with Atlanta on June 7, 2009, and played with the Braves through 2012. He pitched his final Major League season in 2013 with the Angels, who had acquired him in a trade. He died aged 29 from organ failure following "complications of cocaine and alcohol toxicity".

== Early life ==
Hanson was born on August 28, 1986, in Tulsa, Oklahoma as the second child and only son in his family. After moving to California at a very young age, Hanson attended Redlands East Valley High School in Redlands, California, where he played baseball. Hanson played catcher as a freshman, and first base the next year. He was placed on the mound in his junior season, and committed to Sacramento State University as a senior. Hanson graduated in June 2004, instead electing to continue his post-secondary education at Riverside City College. He played for the Corvallis Knights in the West Coast League, an independent summer collegiate baseball league. In 2005, he was selected in the 22nd round (677th overall pick) by the Atlanta Braves as a draft-and-follow pick.

== Professional career ==
=== Atlanta Braves ===
==== Minor leagues ====
The following year, in 2006, Hanson began playing for the Danville Braves of the Appalachian League. In Danville, he began the season as the league's fourth-best prospect according to Baseball America. That season, Hanson ended up starting Game 2 of the Appalachian League Championship Series, finishing the season 4–1 with 56 strikeouts against nine walks. He also had a 2.09 earned run average (ERA) with a 0.99 walks plus hits per inning pitched (WHIP) ratio.

==== 2007 ====
Before the 2007 season began, Hanson was named the best pitching prospect in the South Atlantic League and the ninth-best prospect in the Braves system. Hanson began the 2007 season in Class A, playing for the Rome Braves. With Rome, Hanson amassed a 2–6 record with a 2.59 ERA in 14 starts (and one relief appearance). Midway through the season, Hanson was called up to the Myrtle Beach Pelicans, also a Class A team for the Atlanta Braves. He ended up finishing the season at 3–3 with a 4.20 ERA in 11 starts.

==== 2008 ====
Hanson began the year in Myrtle Beach. In his first start, Hanson pitched five no-hit innings and recorded a then career-best 13 strikeouts (later broken in Double-A that year). Over his seven starts with the Pelicans, he allowed 15 hits in 40 innings. That stat, along with his 3–1 record and 0.90 ERA, earned him a promotion to the Braves' Double-A affiliate, the Mississippi Braves. At Mississippi, Hanson threw a no-hitter in his ninth start while also setting a new career high for strikeouts with 14. Hanson finished the 2008 season with Mississippi. He finished 8–4 with a 3.03 ERA in 18 starts. Following the Minor League season, Hanson won the MiLBY for Class A Advanced Single Game Performance. He won this award for his performance with the Myrtle Beach Pelicans. Hanson was named the Atlanta Braves Pitcher of the Year and was also placed on Baseball America's Minor League Team of the Year. Hanson was invited to the Arizona Fall League to showcase his pitching. He compiled a 5–0 record with a 0.63 ERA while racking up 49 strikeouts in 28.2 innings. Hanson was named the Arizona Fall League's MVP, the first pitcher to receive this award. He was also ranked #24 on MLB.com's Postseason Top 50 Prospects list prior to the 2009 season.

==== 2009 ====
In the 2008 offseason, the Atlanta Braves were one of multiple teams that were interested in trading for San Diego Padres pitcher Jake Peavy. Hanson's name was mentioned throughout the proceedings, but a trade for Peavy did not take place. He was considered by Baseball America to be the top prospect in the Braves' farm system heading into the 2009 season. Hanson began the 2009 season with the Braves' Triple-A affiliate, the Gwinnett Braves.

==== 2009 ====
Hanson was called up by the Braves on June 3, 2009, after the team cut Tom Glavine. He made his debut on June 7 against the Milwaukee Brewers, pitching 6 innings, striking out 5, giving up 6 earned runs, 3 home runs, and receiving a no decision. He gave up two home runs to Ryan Braun, the first being the initial hit allowed in Hanson's major league career.

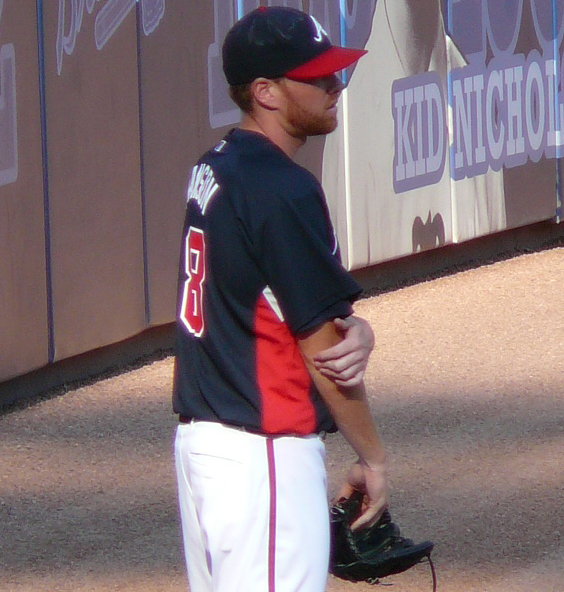
Hanson with the Braves in 2009.

On June 12, Hanson earned his first win against the Baltimore Orioles. On June 28, he threw six scoreless innings against the Boston Red Sox, allowing just 2 hits and 2 walks to improve his career major league record to 4–0 and lowered his ERA to 2.48. In his first 4 major league victories, his combined ERA was 0.78. At one point in the season he had thrown 20 consecutive shutout innings and also became the first National League rookie pitcher to win consecutive starts against the Yankees and the Red Sox. For his efforts, Hanson was named June's NL Rookie of the Month. He was sent down to Single A Myrtle Beach on July 10, and recalled to start an 11–3 win against the San Francisco Giants on July 21. Hanson's first loss came against the team against which he debuted, the Milwaukee Brewers, on July 25. He began another scoreless innings streak of nineteen on September 10, with eight against the Houston Astros, followed by seven against the New York Mets, before losing 4–2 to the Philadelphia Phillies on September 20. Hanson finished third in voting for the National League Rookie of the Year award.

==== 2010 ====
Hanson finished the 2010 campaign with a 10–11 record, 3.33 ERA, and 1.17 WHIP. He set a career-high in innings-pitched with 202 2/3, surrendering 182 hits while striking out 173 batters and walking 56.

==== 2011 ====
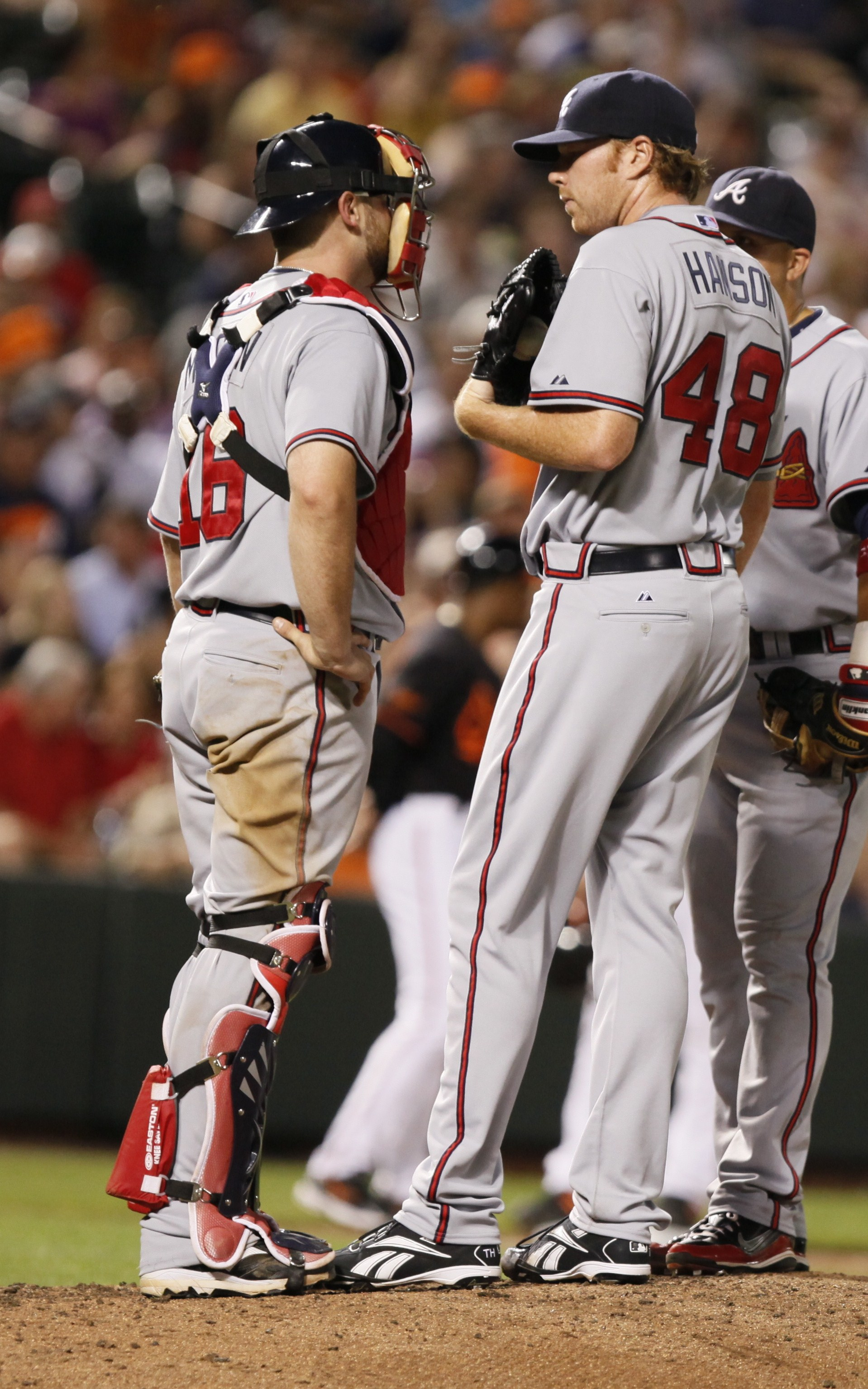
Hanson (right) with Brian McCann

On June 12, Hanson set a new career high of 14 strikeouts in a game against the Houston Astros, which matched the most strikeouts recorded by a pitcher at Minute Maid Park. The pitcher who initially set the record of 14 strikeouts at Minute Maid Park was Bud Norris. At the All-Star break, Hanson led the league in opponents' batting average (.190), was fourth in ERA (2.44), third in K/9 (9.5), second in WHIP (1.016), and tied for third in wins (10). Nonetheless, Hanson was not selected to the National League All-Star team.

==== 2012 ====
In spring training, Hanson worked with team therapist Troy Jones and pitching coach Roger McDowell to eliminate an odd pause at the top of his pitching motion. The change was intended to lessen the injury risk to his shoulder. He was named the Braves' Opening Day starter that season. On July 31, Hanson was placed on the disabled list with a lower back strain. Hanson finished 2012 with a 13–10 record and 161 strikeouts.

=== Los Angeles Angels of Anaheim ===
Hanson was traded to the Angels in exchange for pitcher Jordan Walden on November 30, 2012. He played one season with the Angels, recording a 4–3 record with a 5.42 ERA in 15 appearances (13 starts) in 2013. He took a six-day bereavement leave in April after the death of his stepbrother. After returning and making two starts, he was granted a three-week personal leave to deal with what he described as his "mental issues with the death". After the season, Hanson was non-tendered by the Angels, making him a free agent.

=== Chicago White Sox ===
On February 11, 2014, Hanson agreed to a major league contract with the Texas Rangers. He was released on March 26.

On April 7, 2014, Hanson agreed to a minor league contract with the Chicago White Sox. He spent the season with the Triple-A Charlotte Knights, who placed him on the disabled list on June 12 due to a shoulder injury, which caused him to miss the rest of the season.

=== San Francisco Giants ===
Hanson agreed to a minor league contract with the San Francisco Giants on May 13, 2015. He was assigned to the High-A San Jose Giants and was promoted to the Triple-A Sacramento River Cats on July 5. Hanson made eleven starts for Sacramento during the remainder of the season, pitching to a 3-5 record and a 5.60 ERA with 40 strikeouts.

== Pitching style ==
Hanson threw three main pitches: a four-seam fastball at 89–92 mph, a slider at 78–82 mph, and a curveball at 71–73 mph. He occasionally threw a two-seam fastball and changeup, mainly to left-handed hitters. His slider was his most common 2-strike pitch to right-handers, and was responsible for a plurality of his strikeouts. His curve had the highest whiff rate, at 38% over his career.

== Personal life and death ==
Hanson married his wife, Martha, in November 2013.

On November 8, 2015, Hanson was found unresponsive at the home of an acquaintance near Newnan, Georgia. He was taken to Piedmont Hospital in Atlanta, where he was reported to be comatose and in a state of "catastrophic organ failure". He died the following day, aged 29. An autopsy report concluded that Hanson died from "delayed complications of cocaine and alcohol toxicity", and his death was ruled as an accident.

== See also ==
- List of baseball players who died during their careers
