= Paul Janish =

American baseball player (born 1982)

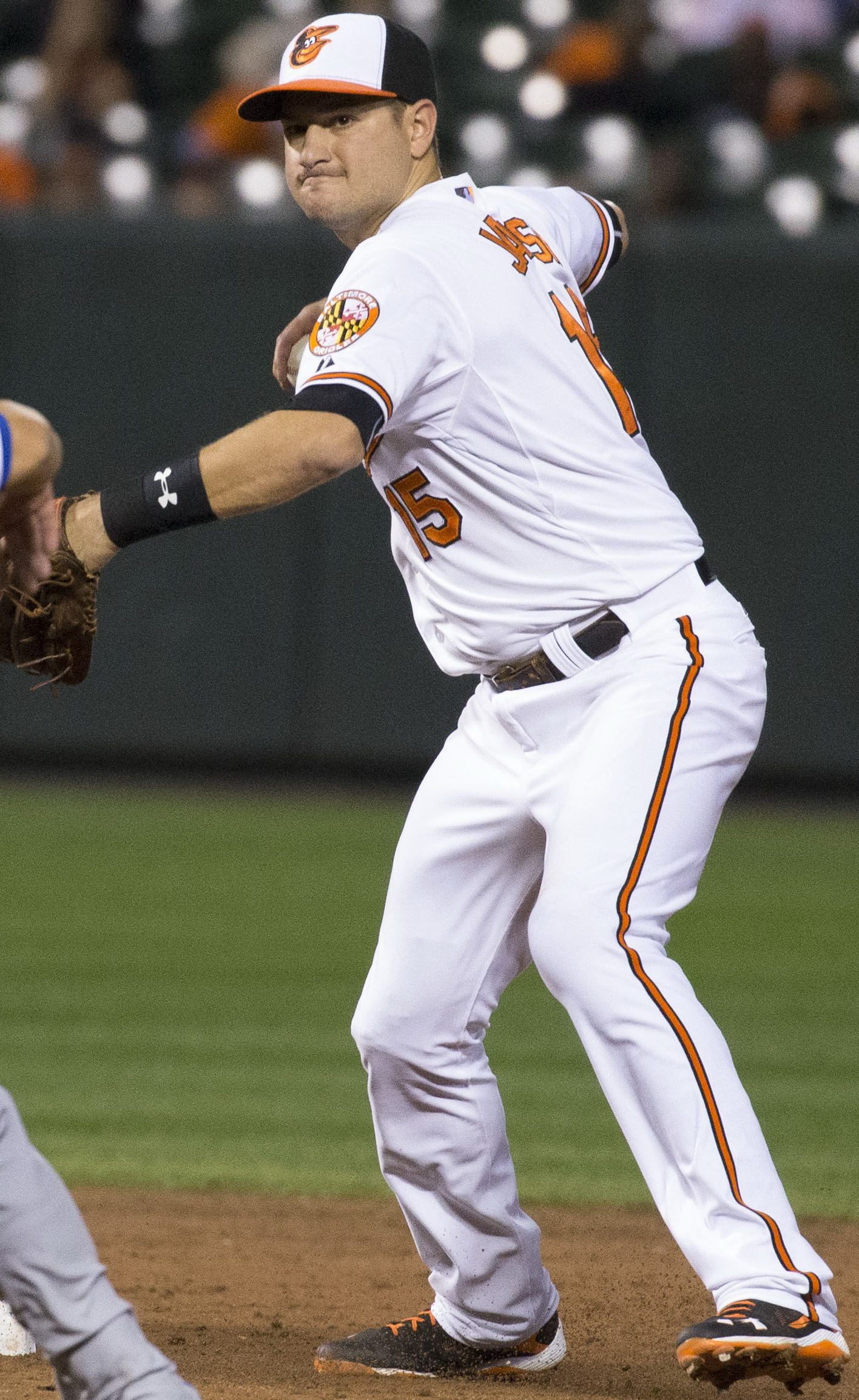
- Janish with the Baltimore Orioles

Chicago White Sox
- Director of Player Development / Shortstop
- Born: October 12, 1982 (age 44); Houston, Texas, U.S.
- Batted: Right Threw: Right

MLB debut
- May 14, 2008, for the Cincinnati Reds

Last MLB appearance
- July 6, 2017, for the Baltimore Orioles

MLB statistics
- Batting average: .212
- Home runs: 7
- Runs batted in: 87
- Stats at Baseball Reference

Teams
- Cincinnati Reds (2008–2011); Atlanta Braves (2012–2013); Baltimore Orioles (2015–2017)
Medals
Men's baseball
Representing United States
Pan American Games
Silver medal – second place	2003 Santo Domingo	Team competition

Paul Ryan Janish (/ˈjɑːnɪʃ/ YAH-nish; born October 12, 1982) is an American baseball coach and former professional baseball shortstop. He is currently the Director of Player Development for the Chicago White Sox of the American League. He played in Major League Baseball (MLB) for the Cincinnati Reds, Atlanta Braves, and Baltimore Orioles.

== High school and college ==
Janish attended Cypress Creek High School where he played shortstop and pitched for the Cougars. He was named to the 2001 Texas 5A All-State team. Janish played for Rice University. In 2002, he played in 61 games at shortstop, had a batting average of .299, and was named to the Western Athletic Conference All-Star team. In 2003, the Rice Owls baseball team won the College World Series as Janish played in 68 games for the team. Janish had his best batting average in 2004 with the Owls, hitting .345, and hitting 9 home runs and 16 doubles as he was named to the WAC All-Star team. During the 2004 MLB draft, the Cincinnati Reds wanted to get position players where they needed them early due to an apparent lack of depth, and as a result chose Janish with the 138th pick in the 5th round of the draft.

== Career ==
=== Cincinnati Reds ===
==== 2004 ====
In his first professional season, Janish batted .263 with 2 home runs and 22 RBI in 66 games for the rookie league Billings Mustangs. He had his best game of the season in a 7–3 win on August 15 of that year at Missoula as he went 4-for-4 with a double and 2 runs scored. Following the season, he was the first recipient of the Dernell Stenson Award as MVP of the Florida Instructional League.

==== 2005 ====
Janish entered the season as the #10 ranked prospect in the Reds organization according to Baseball America. He batted .245 with 5 home runs and 29 RBI in 55 games at Single-A Dayton. On June 8, he underwent Tommy John surgery on his right elbow and missed the remainder of the season.

==== 2006 ====
Janish began the season at Dayton and after 26 games was promoted to Single-A Advanced Sarasota, where he played in 91 games and batted .278 (9 home runs, 55 RBI, 8 stolen bases). He had the fourth-best strikeout to at-bat ratio in the Florida State League (1 every 10.08 plate appearances). On August 30, he was promoted to Double-A Chattanooga and played the last 4 games of the season with the Lookouts (.267, 4 hits).

==== 2007 ====
Began the season by participating in his first major league spring training camp. He spent most of the year at Chattanooga, but made his Triple-A debut playing the last 55 games of the season at Louisville. When he was promoted on July 8, he ranked second in the Southern League in doubles (21) and 5th among all Double-A players in walks (50). Following the season, his strike zone discipline was rated by Baseball America as the best in the organization. On August 9, he hit his first career grand slam off Indianapolis Indians' pitcher Marty McLeary; this was his first career grand slam and his first Triple-A homer. On November 20, he was added to the major league 40-man roster.

==== 2008 ====
Janish began the season with Louisville, hitting .293 in 35 games (4 hr, 20 rbi) before being promoted to the major league club after a string of injuries to middle infielders Alex Gonzalez, Jeff Keppinger, and Jerry Hairston Jr. He returned to the Bats on June 27, but was recalled in September.

==== 2008 ====
Janish recorded a game-winning hit in his first major league game and second major league at-bat. Janish had been called up that day to replace an injured Jeff Keppinger. The Reds had blown a six-run lead in the top of the 9th inning of a May 14, 2008, game against the Florida Marlins. With the score tied at 6, Janish hit an RBI single against Renyel Pinto to score Johnny Cueto for the game winner. It was the first time a player had gotten a walk-off in his major league debut since Miguel Cabrera in 2003, and the first time a player had gotten a game-winning hit for his first hit since Randy Keisler in 2005. On May 18, 2008, Janish got his first major league start at shortstop. He went 3–3 with a walk as the Reds won 6–4 against the Cleveland Indians and then major league leader in ERA Cliff Lee. He delivered another clutch hit, getting a pinch-hit 2-run single to break the 7–7 tie in the 11th inning of the 18-inning game between the Reds and the San Diego Padres on May 25. The Reds lost 12–9. On June 26, the Reds optioned Janish to Louisville to make room for Jerry Hairston Jr., who had been activated from the disabled list.

He also had the most RBI in a game for Louisville that season, getting 6 on April 27 vs. Columbus, during a 4-for-4 performance with 2 doubles and a grand slam.

He finished the 2008 season for the Reds with a .188 average (15-for-80), along with six RBI and his first career and only homer for the season.

==== 2009 ====
Janish made the Reds out of spring training, and spent the whole year with the club. He made 63 starts (82 appearances) at shortstop for the season and one start (two appearances) at third base. The two games at third marked only the 7th and 8th times Janish played at third for his professional career, the other six coming in 2007 at double-A Chattanooga. Janish hit either 2nd or 8th in all but three of his games. Janish is noted for being the first Reds position player to pitch in more than one game since Mel Queen in 1966. He pitched the ninth inning of a 15–3 loss against the Milwaukee Brewers on May 6, allowing five earned runs on five hits, including a two-run homer by Prince Fielder. His second pitching appearance was July 6 against the Philadelphia Phillies, where he pitched the 8th inning of the 22–1 loss, allowing six earned on four hits, including a Jayson Werth grand slam.

Janish became the starting shortstop after the August 14 trade of Alex Gonzalez to the Boston Red Sox. He started 42 of the Reds 48 remaining games, and posted a .995 fielding percentage after the trade that led all MLB shortstops. Overall for the season he committed three errors for a .991 fielding percentage, which would have qualified as the team record if he had appeared in enough games. Janish's first career stolen base came on September 11 against the Chicago Cubs. He became the first Reds player with three doubles in a game since Jorge Cantú in 2007 when Janish had a three hit game on September 15 against the Houston Astros. Overall, he hit .211 in 90 games with one homer and 16 RBI.

Despite the weak bat he displayed over his first two seasons, he was slated to be the Reds starter in 2010 until they signed Orlando Cabrera during the offseason.

==== 2010 ====
Janish made the Opening Day roster for the second straight year, sharing the infield backup job with Miguel Cairo. Janish got very little playing time throughout the season. having just 63 at-bats through the end on July. However, on August 3, Orlando Cabrera went down with a strained oblique and missed the next month on the DL. Janish took over as the starting shortstop and started nearly every game for the 31-day stretch, hitting .263 for the stretch including several clutch hits. He continued to start once or twice a week for September/October and finished the season with career highs in average (.260), home runs (5), RBI (25), on-base percentage (.338) and slugging (.385). He played 11 error-less games at third and 7 error-less games at second, and committed just 4 errors in 62 games at shortstop. He was 0-for-1 in the NLDS.

The Reds declined the option on Cabrera's contract and named Janish the starting shortstop for the 2011 season. The Reds, however, made a big move by signing 2010 World Series MVP shortstop Édgar Rentería to a one-year deal. Many speculated that Janish would be demoted to bench duty once again, but Reds GM Walt Jocketty announced that he had called Janish and confirmed that Paul would still be the starter going into spring training.

==== 2011 ====
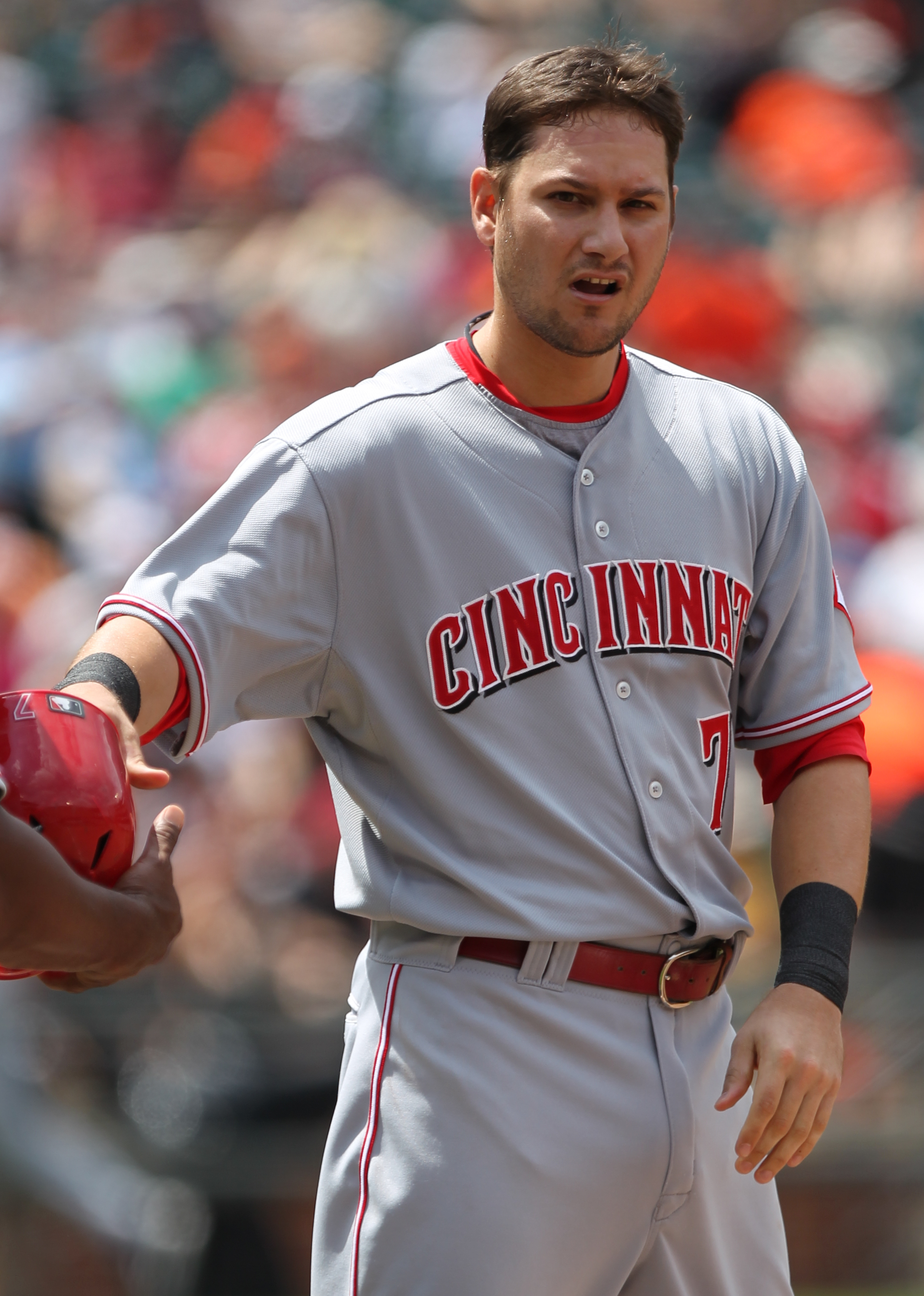
Janish during his tenure with the Cincinnati Reds in 2011.

Janish made the team again out of spring training, but this time he made it as the starter. Janish started Opening Day and played the majority of the games. Édgar Rentería started against pitchers who he had fared well against in the past, but Janish played most games. After Scott Rolen went on the DL and Miguel Cairo had been playing every day, when Cairo needed a day off Janish played third and Rentería played shortstop. However, by July 6, Janish's average had dropped to .227 and he had only 9 extra-base hits with no home runs. He also had nine errors. On July 7, 2011, Janish was demoted to Triple A Louisville Bats in exchange for prospect Zack Cozart. Manager Dusty Baker said that Janish had "put a lot of pressure on himself", "needed to get his confidence back up", and was "definitely a quality shortstop". On July 23, Cozart hyperextended his left elbow and was placed on the DL, so the Reds recalled Janish to take his place.

==== 2012 ====
Janish began the season playing for the Cincinnati Reds' AAA affiliate, the Louisville Bats.

=== Atlanta Braves ===
On July 14, he was traded to the Atlanta Braves for Todd Redmond, in order to replace the injured Andrelton Simmons. On July 20, Janish hit the game-winning RBI in the Braves' 11–10 win over the Washington Nationals, a game in which the Braves had rallied from a 9–0 deficit. In September, Janish suffered a left labrum injury, resulting in surgery. Janish signed a one-year contract to stay at the Braves without going through arbitration.

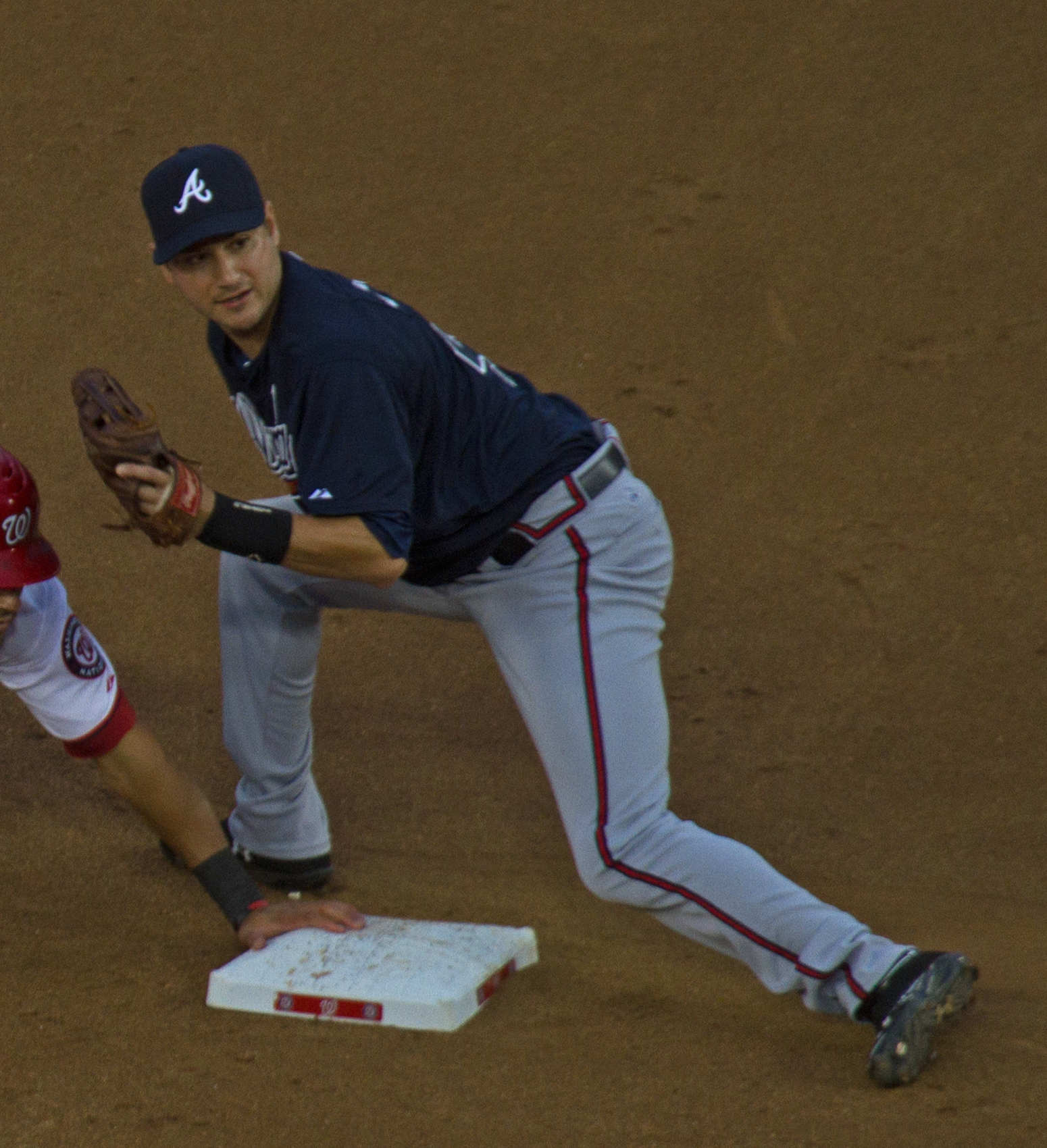
Janish with the Atlanta Braves in 2012.

==== 2013 ====
Janish began the 2013 season on the disabled list. He then began his season with the Gwinnett Braves, Atlanta's AAA affiliate, before being called up on June 21 to replace the injured infielder Ramiro Peña. After the season, Janish was non-tendered by the Braves, making him a free agent.

=== Colorado Rockies ===
==== 2014 ====
He signed a minor league contract with the Colorado Rockies on January 27, 2014, that included an invitation to Major League spring training.

=== Kansas City Royals ===
He signed a minor league deal with the Kansas City Royals on July 4, 2014. He elected free agency after the 2014 season.

=== Baltimore Orioles ===
==== 2015 ====
Janish signed a minor league deal with the Baltimore Orioles on November 21, 2014. He was called up to the Majors on August 25, and made his Orioles debut the same day. He made his first Orioles start on August 25 at shortstop, replacing an injured JJ Hardy. Janish finished the 2015 season hitting .286 with 3 RBIs. He became a free agent on December 2.

=== 2016 ===
Janish signed another minor league deal with the Orioles on December 29, 2015. On May 7, 2016, Janish was recalled from the minors to replace T. J. McFarland. At the time he was hitting .329 with two doubles for the Triple-A Norfolk Tides. Janish played in fourteen games and batted .194 before he was ourighted to the minors on June 21. He was recalled on September 15, but did not play for the rest of the season. The Orioles designated Janish for assignment on October 7.

=== 2017 ===
On February 25, 2017, Janish signed a minor league contract with the Baltimore Orioles. He was brought up to the Orioles on May 21 when Ryan Flaherty was placed on the disabled list. He had his contract purchased again on June 19 when J. J. Hardy was placed on the disabled list.

=== Retirement ===
He accepted an assistant coach position with his alma mater Rice University on August 11. He explained his decision by stating, "Relative to the industry, I’m getting old, man." He will work primarily with the Owls’ infielders. He had originally planned to retire when the season concluded but decided to end his playing career when he requested and received his release from the Orioles on August 21.

== Coaching career ==
Janish was named the new director of player development for the Chicago White Sox on November 2, 2023.
