= 2012 Pittsburgh Pirates season =

2012 Pittsburgh Pirates
- League: National League
- Division: Central
- Ballpark: PNC Park
- City: Pittsburgh, Pennsylvania
- Record: 79–83 (.488)
- Divisional place: 4th
- Owners: Bob Nutting
- General managers: Neal Huntington
- Managers: Clint Hurdle
- Television: Root Sports Pittsburgh
- Radio: KDKA-FM (Steve Blass, Greg Brown, Tim Neverett, Bob Walk, John Wehner)

The 2012 Pittsburgh Pirates season was the franchise's 126th season as a member of the National League, their 131st season overall, and their 12th season at PNC Park. Despite being 67–54 on August 19, the Pirates finished the season 79–83. This set a record for the longest losing season streak in all of North American professional sports history at 20.

The Pirates played just six extra inning games during the season, the fewest of any MLB team in 2012.

== Game log ==
2012 Game Log: 79–83 (Home: 45–36; Away: 34–47)
April: 10–12 (Home: 5–4; Away: 5–8)

#	Date	Opponent	Score	Win	Loss	Save	Attendance	Record
1	April 5	Phillies	0–1	Halladay (1–0)	**Bédard** (0–1)	Papelbon (1)	39,585	0–1
2	April 7	Phillies	2–1 (10)	**Cruz** (1–0)	Blanton (0–1)	—	38,885	1–1
3	April 8	Phillies	5–4	**Hanrahan** (1–0)	Herndon (0–1)	—	19,856	2–1
4	April 10	@ Dodgers	1–2	Jansen (1–0)	**Grilli** (0–1)	Guerra (3)	56,000	2–2
5	April 11	@ Dodgers	1–4	Billingsley (2–0)	**Bédard** (0–2)	Guerra (4)	29,729	2–3
6	April 12	@ Dodgers	2–3	Capuano (1–0)	**Karstens** (0–1)	Guerra (5)	28,328	2–4
7	April 13	@ Giants	0–5	Cain (1–0)	**McDonald** (0–1)	—	41,138	2–5
8	April 14	@ Giants	3–4	López (1–0)	**Resop** (0–1)	—	41,657	2–6
9	April 15	@ Giants	4–1	**Correia** (1–0)	Vogelsong (0–1)	**Hanrahan** (1)	41,766	3–6
10	April 16	@ Diamondbacks	1–5	Saunders (1–0)	**Bédard** (0–3)	—	17,366	3–7
11	April 17	@ Diamondbacks	5–4	**Grilli** (1–1)	Shaw (0–2)	**Cruz** (1)	19,198	4–7
12	April 18	@ Diamondbacks	2–1	**Lincoln** (1–0)	Hudson (1–1)	**Cruz** (2)	18,369	5–7
13	April 20	Cardinals	1–4	Lynn (3–0)	**Morton** (0–1)	Motte (3)	23,509	5–8
14	April 21	Cardinals	2–0	**Burnett** (1–0)	Westbrook (2–1)	**Hanrahan** (2)	25,218	6–8
15	April 22	Cardinals	1–5	Lohse (3–0)	**Bédard** (0–4)	—	30,437	6–9
—	April 23	Rockies	Postponed (rain); Makeup: April 25					
16	April 24	Rockies	5–4	**Watson** (1–0)	Belisle (1–1)	**Hanrahan** (3)	10,484	7–9
17	April 25	Rockies	1–2	Reynolds (2–0)	**Resop** (0–2)	Betancourt (6)	N/A	7–10
18	April 25	Rockies	5–1	**Morton** (1–1)	Chacín (0–2)	—	15,218	8–10
19	April 27	@ Braves	1–6	Hanson (3–2)	**Burnett** (1–1)	Medlen (1)	36,215	8–11
20	April 28	@ Braves	4–2	**Bédard** (1–4)	Delgado (2–2)	**Hanrahan** (4)	34,086	9–11
21	April 29	@ Braves	3–4	Hudson (1–0)	**Correia** (1–1)	Kimbrel (8)	30,419	9–12
22	April 30	@ Braves	9–3	**McDonald** (1–1)	Minor (2–2)	—	17,181	10–12

May: 15–13 (Home: 11–7; Away: 4–6)

#	Date	Opponent	Score	Win	Loss	Save	Attendance	Record
23	May 1	@ Cardinals	7–10	Wainwright (1–3)	**Morton** (1–2)	Motte (4)	36,345	10–13
24	May 2	@ Cardinals	3–12	Lynn (5–0)	**Burnett** (1–2)	—	35,987	10–14
25	May 3	@ Cardinals	6–3	**Bédard** (2–4)	Westbrook (3–2)	—	40,601	11–14
26	May 4	Reds	1–6	Cueto (4–0)	**Correia** (1–2)	—	20,445	11–15
27	May 5	Reds	3–2	**McDonald** (2–1)	Leake (0–4)	**Hanrahan** (5)	33,019	12–15
28	May 6	Reds	0–5	Latos (2–2)	**Morton** (1–3)	—	20,042	12–16
29	May 8	Nationals	5–4	**Watson** (2–0)	Rodríguez (1–2)	—	10,323	13–16
30	May 9	Nationals	4–2	**Lincoln** (2–0)	Detwiler (3–2)	**Hanrahan** (6)	11,478	14–16
31	May 10	Nationals	2–4	Strasburg (3–0)	**Correia** (1–3)	Rodríguez (7)	15,381	14–17
32	May 11	Astros	0–1	Norris (3–1)	**McDonald** (2–2)	Myers (9)	19,878	14–18
33	May 12	Astros	5–2	**Morton** (2–3)	Happ (2–3)	**Cruz** (3)	34,187	15–18
34	May 13	Astros	3–2 (12)	**Watson** (3–0)	Rodriguez (1–4)	—	27,517	16–18
35	May 14	@ Marlins	3–2	**Lincoln** (3–0)	Sánchez (2–1)	**Hanrahan** (7)	25,666	17–18
36	May 15	@ Marlins	2–6	Johnson (1–3)	**Correia** (1–4)	—	24,242	17–19
37	May 16	@ Nationals	4–7	Gonzalez (5–1)	**Bédard** (2–5)	Rodríguez (9)	25,942	17–20
38	May 17	@ Nationals	5–3	**McDonald** (3–2)	Zimmermann (2–4)	**Hanrahan** (8)	25,757	18–20
39	May 18	@ Tigers	0–6	Verlander (5–1)	**Morton** (2–4)	—	41,661	18–21
40	May 19	@ Tigers	4–3	**Burnett** (2–2)	Smyly (1–1)	**Hanrahan** (9)	42,953	19–21
41	May 20	@ Tigers	3–4	Scherzer (3–3)	**Correia** (1–5)	Benoit (1)	39,971	19–22
42	May 21	Mets	5–4	**Hughes** (1–0)	Rauch (3–3)	**Hanrahan** (10)	14,556	20–22
43	May 22	Mets	2–3	Dickey (6–1)	**Cruz** (1–1)	Francisco (11)	15,794	20–23
44	May 23	Mets	1–3	Niese (3–2)	**Morton** (2–5)	Francisco (12)	25,731	20–24
45	May 25	Cubs	1–0	**Burnett** (3–2)	Dempster (0–3)	**Hanrahan** (11)	29,914	21–24
46	May 26	Cubs	3–2	**Hanrahan** (2–0)	Dolis (2–4)	—	38,132	22–24
47	May 27	Cubs	10–4	**Bédard** (3–5)	Garza (2–3)	—	27,486	23–24
48	May 28	Reds	4–1	**McDonald** (4–2)	Arroyo (2–3)	**Hanrahan** (12)	14,792	24–24
49	May 29	Reds	1–8	Bailey (4–3)	**Morton** (2–6)	—	12,077	24–25
50	May 30	Reds	2–1	**Burnett** (4–2)	Cueto (5–3)	**Hanrahan** (13)	16,782	25–25

June: 17–10 (Home: 7–2; Away: 10–8)

#	Date	Opponent	Score	Win	Loss	Save	Attendance	Record
51	June 1	@ Brewers	8–2	**Correia** (2–5)	Wolf (2–5)	—	33,055	26–25
52	June 2	@ Brewers	1–5	Marcum (4–3)	**Bédard** (3–6)	—	39,603	26–26
53	June 3	@ Brewers	6–5	**McDonald** (5–2)	Fiers (1–1)	**Hanrahan** (14)	34,334	27–26
54	June 5	@ Reds	8–4	**Burnett** (5–2)	Bailey (4–4)	**Hanrahan** (15)	19,906	28–26
55	June 6	@ Reds	4–5	Cueto (6–3)	**Lincoln** (3–1)	Chapman (6)	16,859	28–27
56	June 7	@ Reds	5–4 (10)	**Hanrahan** (3–0)	Chapman (4–1)	**Resop** (1)	23,106	29–27
57	June 8	Royals	4–2	**Bédard** (4–6)	Hochevar (3–7)	**Hanrahan** (16)	36,069	30–27
58	June 9	Royals	5–3	**Hughes** (2–0)	Mazzaro (2–1)	**Hanrahan** (17)	39,312	31–27
59	June 10	Royals	3–2	**Burnett** (6–2)	Chen (5–6)	**Grilli** (1)	25,752	32–27
60	June 12	@ Orioles	6–8	Chen (6–2)	**Lincoln** (3–2)	Johnson (19)	15,618	32–28
61	June 13	@ Orioles	1–7	Arrieta (3–8)	**Correia** (2–6)	—	23,238	32–29
62	June 14	@ Orioles	6–12	Hunter (3–3)	**Bédard** (4–7)	—	29,995	32–30
63	June 15	@ Indians	0–2	Masterson (3–6)	**McDonald** (5–3)	Perez (21)	31,920	32–31
64	June 16	@ Indians	9–2	**Burnett** (7–2)	Jiménez (6–5)	—	30,408	33–31
65	June 17	@ Indians	9–5	**Watson** (4–0)	Gómez (4–6)	—	27,388	34–31
66	June 19	Twins	7–2	**Correia** (3–6)	Diamond (5–3)	—	19,936	35–31
67	June 20	Twins	1–2	Burton (1–0)	**Grilli** (1–2)	Perkins (1)	19,878	35–32
68	June 21	Twins	9–1	**McDonald** (6–3)	Hendriks (0–4)	—	21,563	36–32
69	June 22	Tigers	4–1	**Burnett** (8–2)	Fister (1–4)	**Hanrahan** (18)	37,965	37–32
70	June 23	Tigers	4–1	**Lincoln** (4–2)	Scherzer (6–5)	**Hanrahan** (19)	38,734	38–32
71	June 24	Tigers	2–3	Verlander (8–4)	**Resop** (0–3)	—	35,179	38–33
72	June 25	@ Phillies	3–8	Blanton (7–6)	**Karstens** (0–2)	—	44,721	38–34
73	June 26	@ Phillies	4–5	Worley (4–4)	**Bédard** (4–8)	Papelbon (18)	45,096	38–35
74	June 27	@ Phillies	11–7	**McDonald** (7–3)	Valdés (2–1)	—	44,057	39–35
75	June 28	@ Phillies	5–4	**Burnett** (9–2)	Kendrick (2–8)	**Hanrahan** (20)	44,521	40–35
76	June 29	@ Cardinals	14–5	**Correia** (4–6)	Wainwright (6–8)	—	45,382	41–35
77	June 30	@ Cardinals	7–3	**Karstens** (1–2)	Lynn (10–4)	**Hughes** (1)	37,162	42–35

July: 17–9 (Home: 10–3; Away: 7–6)

#	Date	Opponent	Score	Win	Loss	Save	Attendance	Record
78	July 1	@ Cardinals	4–5	Westbrook (7–6)	**Bédard** (4–9)	Motte (17)	37,821	42–36
79	July 2	Astros	11–2	**McDonald** (8–3)	Lyles (2–5)	—	21,041	43–36
80	July 3	Astros	8–7	**Hanrahan** (4–0)	Wright (0–2)	—	21,516	44–36
81	July 4	Astros	6–4	**Correia** (5–6)	Keuchel (1–1)	**Hanrahan** (21)	36,827	45–36
82	July 5	Astros	2–0	**Karstens** (2–2)	Norris (5–6)	**Hanrahan** (22)	21,386	46–36
83	July 6	Giants	5–6	Zito (7–6)	**Bédard** (4–10)	Romo (5)	37,565	46–37
84	July 7	Giants	3–1	**McDonald** (9–3)	Vogelsong (7–4)	**Hanrahan** (23)	37,543	47–37
85	July 8	Giants	13–2	**Burnett** (10–2)	Lincecum (3–10)	—	28,954	48–37
86	July 13	@ Brewers	7–10	Rodríguez (2–4)	**Watson** (4–1)	—	35,025	48–38
87	July 14	@ Brewers	6–4	**Correia** (6–6)	Loe (4–3)	**Hanrahan** (24)	42,029	49–38
88	July 15	@ Brewers	1–4	Gallardo (8–6)	**Burnett** (10–3)	Axford (16)	35,430	49–39
89	July 16	@ Rockies	4–5	Brothers (5–2)	**Grilli** (1–3)	—	36,907	49–40
90	July 17	@ Rockies	6–2	**Bédard** (5–10)	Friedrich (5–7)	**Hanrahan** (25)	42,574	50–40
91	July 18	@ Rockies	9–6	**McDonald** (10–3)	Reynolds (3–1)	**Hanrahan** (26)	30,842	51–40
92	July 20	Marlins	4–3	**Correia** (7–6)	Nolasco (8–8)	**Hanrahan** (27)	37,193	52–40
93	July 21	Marlins	5–1	**Burnett** (11–3)	Zambrano (5–8)	**Lincoln** (1)	39,411	53–40
94	July 22	Marlins	3–0	**Karstens** (3–2)	Sánchez (5–7)	**Hanrahan** (28)	34,203	54–40
95	July 23	Cubs	0–2	Samardzija (7–8)	**Bédard** (5–11)	Mármol (12)	27,586	54–41
96	July 24	Cubs	1–5	Maholm (9–6)	**McDonald** (10–4)	—	32,497	54–42
97	July 25	Cubs	3–2	**Correia** (8–6)	Dempster (5–5)	**Hanrahan** (29)	33,935	55–42
98	July 26	@ Astros	5–3	**Burnett** (12–3)	Keuchel (1–3)	**Hanrahan** (30)	19,926	56–42
99	July 27	@ Astros	6–5	**Watson** (5–1)	Cruz (1–1)	**Hanrahan** (31)	24,685	57–42
100	July 28	@ Astros	4–3	**Resop** (1–3)	Fick (0–1)	**Grilli** (2)	34,146	58–42
101	July 29	@ Astros	5–9	Harrell (8–7)	**McDonald** (10–5)	—	20,453	58–43
102	July 30	@ Cubs	4–14	Germano (1–1)	**Bédard** (5–12)	—	33,337	58–44
103	July 31	@ Cubs	5–0	**Burnett** (13–3)	Coleman (0–2)	—	33,158	59–44

August: 11–17 (Home: 7–10; Away: 4–7)

#	Date	Opponent	Score	Win	Loss	Save	Attendance	Record
104	Aug 1	@ Cubs	8–4	**Karstens** (4–2)	Wood (4–7)	—	33,014	60–44
105	Aug 3	@ Reds	0–3	Latos (10–3)	**Rodríguez** (7–10)	Chapman (24)	40,829	60–45
106	Aug 4	@ Reds	4–5	Broxton (2–2)	**Hughes** (2–1)	Chapman (25)	41,577	60–46
107	Aug 5	@ Reds	6–2	**Burnett** (14–3)	Bailey (9–7)	**Hanrahan** (32)	38,624	61–46
108	Aug 6	Diamondbacks	4–0	**Bédard** (6–12)	Miley (12–7)	—	24,213	62–46
109	Aug 7	Diamondbacks	4–10	Ziegler (5–1)	**Grilli** (1–4)	—	22,655	62–47
110	Aug 8	Diamondbacks	7–6	**Correia** (9–6)	Kennedy (10–9)	**Hanrahan** (33)	25,175	63–47
111	Aug 9	Diamondbacks	3–6	Saunders (6–8)	**Rodríguez** (7–11)	Putz (21)	20,558	63–48
112	Aug 10	Padres	8–9	Brach (1–2)	**Watson** (5–2)	Street (21)	38,702	63–49
113	Aug 11	Padres	0–5	Marquis (8–10)	**Burnett** (14–4)	—	39,485	63–50
114	Aug 12	Padres	11–5	**Bédard** (7–12)	Ohlendorf (4–3)	—	35,352	64–50
115	Aug 13	Dodgers	4–5	Harang (8–7)	**Karstens** (4–3)	Jansen (24)	24,670	64–51
116	Aug 14	Dodgers	0–11	Billingsley (9–9)	**Correia** (9–7)	—	22,729	64–52
117	Aug 15	Dodgers	3–9	Kershaw (11–6)	**Rodríguez** (7–12)	—	26,522	64–53
118	Aug 16	Dodgers	10–6	**Burnett** (15–4)	Blanton (8–11)	—	25,073	65–53
119	Aug 17	@ Cardinals	2–1	**McDonald** (11–5)	Westbrook (12–9)	**Hanrahan** (34)	38,689	66–53
120	Aug 18	@ Cardinals	4–5	Browning (1–2)	**Bédard** (7–13)	Motte (28)	40,313	66–54
121	Aug 19	@ Cardinals	6–3 (19)	**Rodríguez** (8–12)	Browning (1–3)	—	43,412	67–54
122	Aug 20	@ Padres	1–3	Vólquez (8–9)	**Correia** (9–8)	Thayer (7)	20,401	67–55
123	Aug 21	@ Padres	5–7 (10)	Mikolas (2–1)	**McCutchen** (0–1)	—	21,882	67–56
124	Aug 22	@ Padres	2–4	Werner (1–0)	**McDonald** (11–6)	Layne (1)	20,311	67–57
125	Aug 24	Brewers	5–6	Fiers (7–6)	**Rodríguez** (8–13)	Loe (2)	37,197	67–58
126	Aug 25	Brewers	4–0	**Karstens** (5–3)	Marcum (5–4)	—	37,460	68–58
127	Aug 26	Brewers	0–7	Rogers (2–1)	**Bédard** (7–14)	—	36,626	68–59
128	Aug 27	Cardinals	3–4	Lohse (14–2)	**Burnett** (15–5)	Motte (31)	16,700	68–60
129	Aug 28	Cardinals	9–0	**McDonald** (12–6)	Westbrook (13–10)	—	17,492	69–60
130	Aug 29	Cardinals	5–0	**Rodríguez** (9–13)	Kelly (4–6)	—	19,398	70–60
131	Aug 31	@ Brewers	3–9	Rogers (3–1)	**Karstens** (5–4)	—	33,877	70–61

September: 7–21 (Home: 3–9; Away: 4–12)

#	Date	Opponent	Score	Win	Loss	Save	Attendance	Record
132	Sep 1	@ Brewers	2–3	Axford (5–7)	**Hanrahan** (4–1)	—	32,060	70–62
133	Sep 2	@ Brewers	8–12	Loe (5–4)	**McDonald** (12–7)	Axford (23)	32,728	70–63
134	Sep 3	Astros	1–5	González (1–0)	**Locke** (0–1)	—	20,055	70–64
135	Sep 4	Astros	6–2	**Rodríguez** (10–13)	Lyles (3–11)	—	12,785	71–64
136	Sep 5	Astros	6–3	**Correia** (10–8)	Abad (0–3)	—	14,159	72–64
137	Sep 7	Cubs	2–12	Wood (5–11)	**Burnett** (15–6)	—	32,699	72–65
138	Sep 8	Cubs	3–4	Samardzija (9–13)	**Grilli** (1–5)	—	35,661	72–66
139	Sep 9	Cubs	2–4	Russell (7–1)	**Grilli** (1–6)	Mármol (18)	28,671	72–67
140	Sep 10	@ Reds	3–4 (14)	Simón (3–2)	**van den Hurk** (0–1)	—	16,577	72–68
141	Sep 11	@ Reds	3–5	Leake (8–9)	**Correia** (10–9)	Broxton (24)	19,620	72–69
142	Sep 12	@ Reds	1–2	Bailey (11–9)	**Burnett** (15–7)	Hoover (1)	21,203	72–70
143	Sep 14	@ Cubs	4–7	Rusin (1–2)	**McDonald** (12–8)	Mármol (20)	26,946	72–71
144	Sep 15	@ Cubs	7–6	**Rodríguez** (11–13)	Berken (0–1)	**Hanrahan** (35)	32,774	73–71
145	Sep 16	@ Cubs	9–13	Beliveau (1–0)	**Hughes** (2–2)	—	33,559	73–72
146	Sep 17	@ Cubs	3–0	**Correia** (11–9)	Wood (6–12)	**Hanrahan** (36)	33,017	74–72
147	Sep 18	Brewers	0–6	Gallardo (16–8)	**Burnett** (15–8)	—	15,492	74–73
148	Sep 19	Brewers	1–3	Estrada (4–6)	**McPherson** (0–1)	Axford (30)	15,337	74–74
149	Sep 20	Brewers	7–9	Parra (2–3)	**Resop** (1–4)	Axford (31)	14,697	74–75
150	Sep 21	@ Astros	1–7	Rodriguez (2–10)	**Locke** (0–2)	—	17,093	74–76
151	Sep 22	@ Astros	1–4	Keuchel (3–7)	**Correia** (11–10)	López (7)	17,185	74–77
152	Sep 23	@ Astros	8–1	**Burnett** (16–8)	Lyles (4–12)	—	15,207	75–77
153	Sep 24	@ Mets	2–6	Mejía (1–1)	**McPherson** (0–2)	—	22,072	75–78
154	Sep 25	@ Mets	10–6	**Rodríguez** (12–13)	McHugh (0–3)	—	25,286	76–78
155	Sep 26	@ Mets	0–6	Hefner (3–7)	**Locke** (0–3)	—	22,890	76–79
156	Sep 27	@ Mets	5–6	Dickey (20–6)	**Correia** (11–11)	Parnell (5)	31,506	76–80
157	Sep 28	Reds	0–1	Bailey (13–10)	**Burnett** (16–9)	—	34,796	76–81
158	Sep 29	Reds	2–1	**Hanrahan** (5–1)	Broxton (4–4)	—	38,623	77–81
159	Sep 30	Reds	3–4	Marshall (5–5)	**Hanrahan** (5–2)	Chapman (37)	32,814	77–82

October: 2–1 (Home: 2–1; Away: 0–0)

#	Date	Opponent	Score	Win	Loss	Save	Attendance	Record
160	Oct 1	Braves	2–1	**Locke** (1–3)	Maholm (13–11)	Hughes (2)	15,009	78–82
161	Oct 2	Braves	5–1	**Correia** (12–11)	Hanson (13–10)	—	15,727	79–82
162	Oct 3	Braves	0–4	Avilán (1–0)	**Burnett** (16–10)	—	20,615	79–83

Legend: = Win = Loss = Postponement
Bold = Pirates team member

== Season standings ==
=== NL Central standings ===
NL Central
Team	W	L	Pct.	GB	Home	Road
Cincinnati Reds	97	65	.599	—	50‍–‍31	47‍–‍34
St. Louis Cardinals	88	74	.543	9	50‍–‍31	38‍–‍43
Milwaukee Brewers	83	79	.512	14	49‍–‍32	34‍–‍47
Pittsburgh Pirates	79	83	.488	18	45‍–‍36	34‍–‍47
Chicago Cubs	61	101	.377	36	38‍–‍43	23‍–‍58
Houston Astros	55	107	.340	42	35‍–‍46	20‍–‍61

=== NL Wild Card ===
Division leaders
Team	W	L	Pct.
Washington Nationals	98	64	.605
Cincinnati Reds	97	65	.599
San Francisco Giants	94	68	.580

Wild Card teams (Top 2 teams qualify for postseason)
Team	W	L	Pct.	GB
Atlanta Braves	94	68	.580	+6
St. Louis Cardinals	88	74	.543	—
Los Angeles Dodgers	86	76	.531	2
Milwaukee Brewers	83	79	.512	5
Philadelphia Phillies	81	81	.500	7
Arizona Diamondbacks	81	81	.500	7
Pittsburgh Pirates	79	83	.488	9
San Diego Padres	76	86	.469	12
New York Mets	74	88	.457	14
Miami Marlins	69	93	.426	19
Colorado Rockies	64	98	.395	24
Chicago Cubs	61	101	.377	27
Houston Astros	55	107	.340	33

=== Record vs. opponents ===
2012 National League record Source: MLB Standings Grid – 2012
Team	AZ	ATL	CHC	CIN	COL	MIA	HOU	LAD	MIL	NYM	PHI	PIT	SD	SF	STL	WSH	AL
Arizona	–	2–5	5–4	2–5	9–7	5–3	6–0	12–6	3–3	3–4	2–4	3–4	7–11	9–9	1–5	2–4	9–6
Atlanta	5–2	–	3–4	1–5	6–1	14–4	4–2	3–3	3–3	12–6	12–6	3–4	4–3	3–4	5–1	8–10	8–10
Chicago	4–5	4–3	–	4–12	2–4	8–5	2–4	2–4	4–13	4–2	2–4	8–8	3–3	1–6	7–10	1–6	5–10
Cincinnati	5–2	5–1	12–4	–	5–1	10–5	2–4	3–3	9–6	6–2	3–4	11–7	6–2	4–3	6–7	2–5	7–8
Colorado	7–9	1–6	4–2	1–5	–	5–2	5–2	8–10	5–1	5–2	2–7	2–4	8–10	4–14	2–5	4–3	2–13
Houston	0–6	2–4	5–8	5–10	2–5	–	2–4	2–4	8–9	4–2	3–3	5–12	3–5	1–8	4–11	1–7	6–9
Los Angeles	6–12	3–3	4–2	4–2	10–8	4–2	–	4–2	1–6	4–3	5–2	6–1	11–7	8–10	6–5	4–2	6–9
Miami	3–5	4–14	4–2	3–3	4–3	–	4–2	2–4	4–4	4–12	8–10	1–4	5–1	5–2	2–5	9–9	5–13
Milwaukee	3–3	3–3	13–4	6–9	1–5	9–8	6–1	4–4	–	3–2	2–5	11–4	3–4	2–4	6–9	3–5	6–9
New York	4–3	6–12	2–4	2–6	2–5	2–4	3–4	12–4	2–3	–	10–8	5–2	4–3	4–4	4–3	4–14	8–7
Philadelphia	4–2	6–12	4–2	4–3	7–2	10–8	3–3	2–5	5–2	8–10	–	3–4	4–3	2–4	5–2	9–9	5–10
Pittsburgh	4–3	2–3	8–8	7–11	4–2	4–1	12–5	1–6	4–11	2–5	4–3	–	1–5	3–3	8–7	3–2	10–8
San Diego	11–7	3–4	3–3	2–6	10–8	5–3	7–11	1–5	4–3	3–4	3–4	5–1	–	6–12	3–3	2–3	8–7
San Francisco	9–9	4–3	6–1	3–4	14–4	2–5	8–1	10–8	4–2	4–4	4–2	3–3	12–6	–	3–3	1–5	7–8
St. Louis	5–1	1–5	10–7	7–6	5–2	11–4	5–6	5–2	9–6	3–4	3–4	7–8	3–3	3–3	–	3–4	8–7
Washington	4–2	10–8	6–1	5–2	3–4	7–1	2–4	9–9	5–3	14–4	9–9	2–3	3–2	5–1	4–3	–	10–8

=== Detailed records ===
National League
Opponent	W	L	WP	RS	RA
NL East
Atlanta Braves	4	3	0.571	24	21
Miami Marlins	4	1	0.800	17	12
New York Mets	2	5	0.286	25	34
Philadelphia Phillies	4	3	0.571	30	30
Washington Nationals	3	2	0.600	20	20
Total	17	14	0.548	116	117
NL Central
Chicago Cubs	8	8	0.500	65	79
Cincinnati Reds	7	11	0.389	50	63
Houston Astros	12	5	0.706	78	60
Milwaukee Brewers	4	11	0.267	59	85
Pittsburgh Pirates					
St. Louis Cardinals	8	7	0.533	74	60
Total	39	42	0.481	326	347
NL West
Arizona Diamondbacks	4	3	0.571	26	32
Colorado Rockies	4	2	0.667	30	20
Los Angeles Dodgers	1	6	0.143	21	40
San Diego Padres	1	5	0.167	27	33
San Francisco Giants	3	3	0.500	28	19
Total	13	19	0.406	132	144
American League
Baltimore Orioles	0	3	0.000	13	27
Cleveland Indians	2	1	0.667	18	9
Detroit Tigers	3	3	0.500	17	18
Kansas City Royals	3	0	1.000	12	7
Minnesota Twins	2	1	0.667	17	5
Total	10	8	0.556	77	66
Season Total	79	83	0.488	651	674

Month	Games	Won	Lost	Win %	RS	RA
April	22	10	12	0.455	58	66
May	28	15	13	0.536	89	110
June	27	17	10	0.630	146	110
July	26	17	9	0.654	130	105
August	28	11	17	0.393	121	135
September	28	7	21	0.250	100	142
October	3	2	1	0.667	7	6
Total	162	79	83	0.488	651	674

	Games	Won	Lost	Win %	RS	RA
Home	81	45	36	0.556	297	277
Away	81	34	47	0.420	354	397
Total	162	79	83	0.488	651	674

== Roster ==
2012 Pittsburgh Pirates
Roster
Pitchers: 45 Érik Bédard; 34 A. J. Burnett; 29 Kevin Correia; 37 Juan Cruz; 39 Jason Grilli; 52 Joel Hanrahan; 48 Jared Hughes; 27 Jeff Karstens; 63 Chris Leroux; 32 Brad Lincoln; 49 Jeff Locke; 25 Daniel McCutchen; 53 James McDonald; 60 Kyle McPherson; 47 Evan Meek; 57 Bryan Morris; 50 Charlie Morton; 32 Chad Qualls; 30 Chris Resop; 51 Wandy Rodríguez; 43 Doug Slaten; 41 Hisanori Takahashi; 35 Rick van den Hurk; 44 Tony Watson; 61 Justin Wilson	Catchers: 26 Rod Barajas; 10 Eric Fryer; 55 Michael McKenry; Infielders: 24 Pedro Alvarez; 12 Clint Barmes; 19 Jeff Clement; 3 Chase d'Arnaud; 65 Matt Hague; 5 Josh Harrison; 2 Brock Holt; 14 Casey McGehee; 69 Jordy Mercer; 14 Gaby Sánchez; 18 Neil Walker	Outfielders: 62 Gorkys Hernández; 46 Garrett Jones; 6 Starling Marté; 2 Nate McLouth; 22 Andrew McCutchen; 36 Yamaico Navarro; 7 Alex Presley; 23 Travis Snider; 17 Drew Sutton; 31 José Tábata	Manager: 13 Clint Hurdle; Coaches: 86 Heberto Andrade (bullpen catcher); 28 Jeff Banister (bench); 16 Nick Leyva (third base); 58 Gregg Ritchie (hitting); 56 Euclides Rojas (bullpen); 54 Ray Searage (pitching); 15 Luis Silverio (first base); 59 Mark Strittmatter (coach)

=== Opening day lineup ===
Opening Day Starters
Name	Position
Alex Presley	LF
José Tábata	RF
Andrew McCutchen	CF
Neil Walker	2B
Garrett Jones	1B
Rod Barajas	C
Pedro Álvarez	3B
Clint Barmes	SS
Érik Bédard	SP

== Notable achievements ==
=== Awards ===
2012 Major League Baseball All-Star Game

- Joel Hanrahan, P, reserve
- Andrew McCutchen, OF, reserve

Golden Glove Awards

- Andrew McCutchen, OF

Silver Slugger Award

- Andrew McCutchen, OF

NL Player of the Month

- Andrew McCutchen (June) and (July)

NL Player of the Week

- Andrew McCutchen (July 2–8) and (July 9–15)
- A. J. Burnett (July 30–August 5)
- Pedro Alvarez (August 27–September 2)

=== Milestones ===
Regular season
Player	Milestone	Reached
A. McCutchen	100th Career Double	April 25, 2012
J. McDonald	100th Career Game	April 30, 2012
J. Hanrahan	300th Career Game	May 8, 2012
A. Burnett	2000th Career Inning Pitched	May 25, 2012
E. Bédard	1000th Career Inning Pitched	May 27, 2012
A. McCutchen	500th Career Hit	June 7, 2012
C. MCGehee	500th Career Game	June 26, 2012
E. Bédard	1000th Career Strikeout	July 1, 2012
J. Grilli	300th Career Game	July 4, 2012
G. Jones	100th Career Double	July 5, 2012
A. McCutchen	500th Career Game	July 7, 2012
G. Jones	500th Career Game	July 24, 2012
K. Correia	1000th Career Inning Pitched	July 25, 2012
A. Burnett	10th Career Shutout	July 31, 2012
C. Resop	200th Career Game	August 12, 2012
T. Watson	100th Career Game	September 8, 2012

== Statistics ==
Batters

Note: G = Games played; AB = At bats; H = Hits; Avg. = Batting average; HR = Home runs; RBI = Runs batted in

Regular season
Player	G	AB	H	Avg.	HR	RBI
Andrew McCutchen	157	593	194	0.327	31	96
Brock Holt	24	65	19	0.292	0	3
Neil Walker	129	472	132	0.280	14	69
Garrett Jones	145	475	130	0.274	27	86
Starling Marte	47	167	43	0.257	5	17
Eric Fryer	6	4	1	0.250	0	0
Travis Snider	50	128	32	0.250	1	9
Pedro Álvarez	149	525	128	0.244	30	85
Drew Sutton	24	74	18	0.243	1	7
José Tábata	103	333	81	0.243	3	16
Gaby Sánchez	50	116	28	0.241	4	13
Alex Presley	104	346	82	0.237	10	25
Michael McKenry	88	240	56	0.233	12	39
Josh Harrison	104	249	58	0.233	3	16
Casey McGehee	92	265	61	0.230	8	35
Clint Barmes	144	455	104	0.229	8	45
Matt Hague	30	70	16	0.229	0	7
Jordy Mercer	42	62	13	0.210	1	5
Rod Barajas	104	321	66	0.206	11	31
Brad Lincoln	25	10	2	0.200	0	0
Wandy Rodríguez	13	24	4	0.167	0	1
Yamaico Navarro	29	50	8	0.160	1	4
James McDonald	32	49	7	0.143	0	1
Nate McLouth	34	57	8	0.140	0	2
Jeff Clement	23	22	3	0.136	0	1
Érik Bédard	23	37	4	0.108	0	0
Jeff Karstens	19	28	3	0.107	0	2
Kevin Correia	30	47	5	0.106	0	0
Jeff Locke	8	11	1	0.091	0	0
Gorkys Hernández	25	24	2	0.083	0	2
A. J. Burnett	29	63	4	0.063	0	2
Chase d'Arnaud	8	6	0	0.000	0	1
Jared Hughes	62	1	0	0.000	0	0
Chris Leroux	10	1	0	0.000	0	0
Kyle McPherson	10	5	0	0.000	0	0
Charlie Morton	8	13	0	0.000	0	0
Chris Resop	58	3	0	0.000	0	0
Tony Watson	64	1	0	0.000	0	0
Juan Cruz	40	0	0	—	0	0
Jason Grilli	61	0	0	—	0	0
Joel Hanrahan	60	0	0	—	0	0
Daniel McCutchen	1	0	0	—	0	0
Evan Meek	12	0	0	—	0	0
Bryan Morris	5	0	0	—	0	0
Chad Qualls	17	0	0	—	0	0
Doug Slaten	7	0	0	—	0	0
Hisanori Takahashi	9	0	0	—	0	0
Rick van den Hurk	4	0	0	—	0	0
Justin Wilson	8	0	0	—	0	0
Team Totals		5,412	1,312	0.243	170	620
Rank		27	26	25	12	24

Pitchers

Note: G = Games pitched; IP = Innings pitched; W = Wins; L = Losses; ERA = Earned run average; SO = Strikeouts

Regular season
Player	G	IP	W	L	ERA	SO
Bryan Morris	5	5	0	0	1.80	6
Justin Wilson	8	4 2/3	0	0	1.93	7
Joel Hanrahan	63	59 2/3	5	2	2.72	67
Brad Lincoln	28	59 1/3	4	2	2.73	60
Kyle McPherson	10	26 1/3	0	2	2.73	21
Doug Slaten	10	13	0	0	2.77	6
Juan Cruz	43	35 2/3	1	1	2.78	33
Jared Hughes	66	75 2/3	2	2	2.85	50
Jason Grilli	64	58 2/3	1	6	2.91	90
Tony Watson	68	53 1/3	5	2	3.38	53
A. J. Burnett	31	202 1/3	16	10	3.51	180
Wandy Rodríguez	13	75	5	4	3.72	50
Chris Resop	61	73 2/3	1	4	3.91	46
Jeff Karstens	19	90 2/3	5	4	3.97	66
Kevin Correia	32	171	12	11	4.21	89
James McDonald	30	171	12	8	4.21	151
Charlie Morton	9	50 1/3	2	6	4.65	25
Érik Bédard	24	125 2/3	7	14	5.01	118
Jeff Locke	8	34 1/3	1	3	5.50	34
Chris Leroux	10	11 1/3	0	0	5.56	12
Chad Qualls	17	13 2/3	0	0	6.59	6
Evan Meek	12	12	0	0	6.75	8
Hisanori Takahashi	9	8 1/3	0	0	8.64	11
Rick van den Hurk	4	2 2 2/3	0	1	13.50	3
Daniel McCutchen	1	0	0	1	—	0
Team Totals		1,433 1/3	79	83	3.86	1,192
Rank		T–25	8	13	13	17

== Transactions ==
=== Off-season ===
- On November 10, 2011, the Pittsburgh Pirates signed free agent (C) Rod Barajas to a 1 year/$4 million contract with club option for 2013 ($3.5 million with no buyout).
- On November 21, 2011, the Pittsburgh Pirates signed free agent (SS) Clint Barmes to a 2 year/$10.5 million contract.
- On December 7, 2012, the Pittsburgh Pirates signed free agent (LHP) Érik Bédard to a 1 year/$4.5 million contract.
- On December 7, 2011, the Pittsburgh Pirates signed free agent (LF) Nate McLouth to a 1 year/$1.75 million contract.
- On December 7, 2011, the Pittsburgh Pirates traded Brooks Pounders and Diego Goris to the Kansas City Royals in exchange for Yamaico Navarro.
- On December 12, 2011, the Pittsburgh Pirates re-signed (RHP) Jason Grilli to a 1 year/$1.1 million contract.
- On January 13, 2012, the Pittsburgh Pirates re-signed (RHP) Chris Resop to a 1 year/$850,000 contract.
- On January 16, 2012, the Pittsburgh Pirates re-signed (RHP) Charlie Morton to a 1 year/$2.445 million contract.
- On January 16, 2012, the Pittsburgh Pirates re-signed (RHP) Joel Hanrahan to a 1 year/$4.1 million contract.
- On January 16, 2012, the Pittsburgh Pirates re-signed (RHP) Evan Meek to a 1 year/$875,000 contract with $25,000 in performance bonuses.
- On January 16, 2012, the Pittsburgh Pirates re-signed (RHP) Jeff Karstens to a 1 year/$3.1 million contract.
- On February 16, 2012, the Pittsburgh Pirates re-signed (1B) Casey McGehee to a 1 year/$2.35 million contract.
- On February 16, 2012, the Pittsburgh Pirates re-signed (RF) Garrett Jones to a 1 year/$2.25 million contract.
- On February 19, 2012, the Pittsburgh Pirates acquired A. J. Burnett and $20 million from the New York Yankees in exchange for Diego Moreno and Exicardo Coyones.
- On March 3, 2012, the Pittsburgh Pirates re-signed (LF) Alex Presley, (CF) Andrew McCutchen, (RHP) Bryan Morris, (RHP) Brad Lincoln, (2B-SS) Chase d'Arnaud, (RHP) Chris Leroux, (RHP) Daniel McCutchen, (LHP) Daniel Moskos, (OF) Gorkys Hernández, (SS) Gustavo Nunez, (RHP) James McDonald, (LHP) Jeff Locke, (SS) Jordy Mercer, (3B) Josh Harrison, (LHP) Justin Wilson, (RHP) Kyle McPherson, (1B) Matt Hague, (RHP) Duke Welker, (C) Michael McKenry, (2B) Neil Walker, (LHP) Rudy Owens, (LF) Starling Marte, (LHP) Tony Watson, (RHP) Jared Hughes and (3B) Yamaico Navarro to 1 year contracts.
- On March 4, 2012, the Pittsburgh Pirates re-signed (CF) Andrew McCuchen to a 6 year/$51.5 million contract extension.
- On March 30, 2012, the Pittsburgh Pirates traded (RHP) Ryota Igarashi to the Toronto Blue Jays in exchange for a player to be named or cash considerations.

=== In-season ===
- On May 20, 2012, the Pittsburgh Pirates acquired (2B) Drew Sutton from the Atlanta Braves in exchange for cash considerations.
- On May 21, 2012, the Pittsburgh Pirates traded (2B) Drew Sutton to the Tampa Bay Rays in exchange for a player to be named later or cash considerations.
- On May 31, 2012, the Pittsburgh Pirates released (LF) Nate McLouth.
- On June 24, 2012, the Pittsburgh Pirates claimed (2B) Drew Sutton off waivers from the Tampa Bay Rays.
- On July 24, 2012, the Pittsburgh Pirates traded (LHP) Rudy Owens, Colton Cain and (LHP) Robbie Grossman to the Houston Astros in exchange for (LHP) Wandy Rodríguez.
- On July 30, 2012, the Pittsburgh Pirates traded (RHP) Brad Lincoln to the Toronto Blue Jays in exchange for (RF) Travis Snider.
- On July 31, 2012, the Pittsburgh Pirates traded (1B) Casey McGehee to the New York Yankees in exchange for (RHP) Chad Qualls.
- On July 31, 2012, the Pittsburgh Pirates traded (OF) Gorkys Hernández and a 2013 compensation round A draft pick to the Miami Marlins in exchange for (RHP) Gaby Sánchez and Kyle Kaminska.
- On August 24, 2012, the Pittsburgh Pirates claimed (RHP) Hisanori Takahashi off waivers from the Los Angeles Angels of Anaheim.
- On August 27, 2012, the Pittsburgh Pirates released (LHP) Érik Bédard.
- On October 25, 2012, the Pittsburgh Pirates claimed (RHP) Chad Beck from the Toronto Blue Jays and (C) Alí Solís from the San Diego Padres off waivers.
- On October 31, 2012, the Pittsburgh Pirates named Jay Bell as hitting coach, Rick Sofield as first base coach and Dave Jauss as major league coach. The Pirates also reassigned Luis Silverio as Senior Advisor, Latin America Operations.

== Farm system ==
Level	Team	League	Manager
AAA	Indianapolis Indians	International League	Dean Treanor
AA	Altoona Curve	Eastern League	P. J. Forbes
A	Bradenton Marauders	Florida State League	Carlos García
A	West Virginia Power	South Atlantic League	Rick Sofield
A-Short Season	State College Spikes	New York–Penn League	Dave Turgeon
Rookie	GCL Pirates	Gulf Coast League	Tom Prince
Rookie	DSL Pirates 1	Dominican Summer League	Gerardo Alvarez
Rookie	DSL Pirates 2	Dominican Summer League	Larry Sutton

LEAGUE CHAMPIONS: DSL Pirates 1, GCL Pirates
