= 2012 Milwaukee Brewers season =

2012 Milwaukee Brewers
- League: National League
- Division: Central
- Ballpark: Miller Park
- City: Milwaukee, Wisconsin
- Record: 83–79 (.512)
- Divisional place: 3rd
- Owners: Mark Attanasio
- General managers: Doug Melvin
- Managers: Ron Roenicke
- Television: WBME-CA; Fox Sports Wisconsin (Brian Anderson, Bill Schroeder, Craig Coshun)
- Radio: 620 WTMJ (Bob Uecker, Joe Block)
- Stats: ESPN.com; Baseball Reference

The Milwaukee Brewers' 2012 season was the 43rd season for the franchise in Milwaukee, the 15th in the National League, and 44th overall. The Brewers finished the season with an 83–79 record and third place in the National League Central. They did not make the playoffs.

The Brewers struck out 10 or more opposing batters in each of eight consecutive games between August 20 and August 28, the longest such streak in MLB history as of 2016.

== Regular season ==
=== NL Central standings ===
NL Central
Team	W	L	Pct.	GB	Home	Road
Cincinnati Reds	97	65	.599	—	50‍–‍31	47‍–‍34
St. Louis Cardinals	88	74	.543	9	50‍–‍31	38‍–‍43
Milwaukee Brewers	83	79	.512	14	49‍–‍32	34‍–‍47
Pittsburgh Pirates	79	83	.488	18	45‍–‍36	34‍–‍47
Chicago Cubs	61	101	.377	36	38‍–‍43	23‍–‍58
Houston Astros	55	107	.340	42	35‍–‍46	20‍–‍61

=== NL Wild Card ===
Division leaders
Team	W	L	Pct.
Washington Nationals	98	64	.605
Cincinnati Reds	97	65	.599
San Francisco Giants	94	68	.580

Wild Card teams (Top 2 teams qualify for postseason)
Team	W	L	Pct.	GB
Atlanta Braves	94	68	.580	+6
St. Louis Cardinals	88	74	.543	—
Los Angeles Dodgers	86	76	.531	2
Milwaukee Brewers	83	79	.512	5
Philadelphia Phillies	81	81	.500	7
Arizona Diamondbacks	81	81	.500	7
Pittsburgh Pirates	79	83	.488	9
San Diego Padres	76	86	.469	12
New York Mets	74	88	.457	14
Miami Marlins	69	93	.426	19
Colorado Rockies	64	98	.395	24
Chicago Cubs	61	101	.377	27
Houston Astros	55	107	.340	33

=== Roster ===
2012 Milwaukee Brewers
Roster
Pitchers: 59 John Axford; 54 Vinnie Chulk; 48 Tim Dillard; 41 Marco Estrada; 64 Michael Fiers; 49 Yovani Gallardo; 13 Zack Greinke; 51 Jim Henderson; 61 Liván Hernández; 53 Brandon Kintzler; 50 Kameron Loe; 18 Shaun Marcum; 58 Mike McClendon; 38 Chris Narveson; 26 Manny Parra; 60 Wily Peralta; 46 Juan Pérez; 57 Francisco Rodríguez; 37 Mark Rogers; 54 Josh Stinson; 63 Tyler Thornburg; 40 José Veras; 43 Randy Wolf	Catchers: 9 George Kottaras; 20 Jonathan Lucroy; 12 Martín Maldonado; 3 Yorvit Torrealba; Infielders: 14 Jeff Bianchi; 14 Brooks Conrad; 33 Eric Farris; 24 Mat Gamel; 11 Álex González; 5 Taylor Green; 1 Corey Hart; 45 Travis Ishikawa; 3 César Izturis; 29 Edwin Maysonet; 16 Aramis Ramírez; 21 Cody Ransom; 9 Jean Segura; 23 Rickie Weeks	Outfielders: 7 Norichika Aoki; 8 Ryan Braun; 27 Carlos Gómez; 2 Nyjer Morgan; 22 Logan Schafer	Manager: 10 Ron Roenicke; Coaches: 55 Marcus Hanel (bullpen catcher); 35 Garth Iorg (first base); 39 Rick Kranitz (pitching); 53 Stan Kyles (bullpen); 36 Jerry Narron (bench); 32 Johnny Narron (hitting); 6 Ed Sedar (third base); 85 Lee Tunnell (bullpen)

== Player stats ==
=== Batting ===
Note: G = Games played; AB = At bats; R = Runs; H = Hits; 2B = Doubles; 3B = Triples; HR = Home runs; RBI = Runs batted in; SB = Stolen bases; BB = Walks; AVG = Batting average; SLG = Slugging average

Player	G	AB	R	H	2B	3B	HR	RBI	SB	BB	AVG	SLG
Ryan Braun	154	598	108	191	36	3	41	112	30	63	.319	.595
Rickie Weeks	157	588	85	135	29	4	21	63	16	74	.230	.400
Aramis Ramírez	149	570	92	171	50	3	27	105	9	44	.300	.540
Corey Hart	149	562	91	152	35	4	30	83	5	44	.270	.507
Nori Aoki	151	520	81	150	37	4	10	50	30	43	.288	.433
Carlos Gómez	137	415	72	108	19	4	19	51	37	20	.260	.463
Jonathan Lucroy	96	316	46	101	17	4	12	58	4	22	.320	.513
Nyjer Morgan	122	289	41	69	5	3	3	16	12	20	.239	.308
Martín Maldonado	78	233	22	62	9	0	8	30	1	17	.266	.408
Cody Ransom	64	168	18	33	7	0	6	26	0	23	.196	.345
Cesar Izturis	57	162	9	38	6	2	2	11	1	3	.235	.333
Travis Ishikawa	94	152	19	39	12	1	4	30	0	13	.257	.428
Jean Segura	44	148	19	39	4	3	0	14	7	13	.264	.331
Taylor Green	58	103	8	19	7	0	3	14	0	10	.184	.340
George Kottaras	58	86	10	18	4	0	3	12	0	29	.209	.360
Álex González	24	81	8	21	4	0	4	15	1	6	.259	.457
Jeff Bianchi	33	69	8	13	2	0	3	9	0	4	.188	.348
Mat Gamel	21	69	10	17	2	1	1	6	3	4	.246	.348
Edwin Maysonet	30	60	7	15	1	1	1	4	1	3	.250	.350
Brooks Conrad	25	40	2	3	0	0	2	6	0	3	.075	.225
Logan Schafer	16	23	3	7	1	2	0	5	0	1	.304	.522
Eric Farris	13	8	1	1	0	0	0	0	1	1	.125	.125
Yorvit Torrealba	5	5	0	0	0	0	0	0	0	1	.000	.000
Pitcher totals	162	292	13	40	13	0	2	21	0	5	.137	.202
**Team totals**	**162**	**5557**	**776**	**1442**	**300**	**39**	**202**	**741**	**158**	**466**	**.259**	**.437**

=== Pitching ===
Note: W = Wins; L = Losses; ERA = Earned run average; G = Games pitched; GS = Games started; SV = Saves; IP = Innings pitched; H = Hits allowed; R = Runs allowed; ER = Earned runs allowed; BB = Walks allowed; SO = Strikeouts

Player	W	L	ERA	G	GS	SV	IP	H	R	ER	BB	SO
Yovani Gallardo	16	9	3.66	33	33	0	204.0	185	86	83	81	204
Randy Wolf	3	10	5.69	25	24	0	142.1	179	94	90	45	96
Marco Estrada	5	7	3.64	29	23	0	138.1	129	62	56	29	143
Mike Fiers	9	10	3.74	23	22	0	127.2	125	56	53	36	135
Shaun Marcum	7	4	3.70	21	21	0	124.0	116	57	51	41	109
Zack Greinke	9	3	3.44	21	21	0	123.0	120	49	47	28	122
Francisco Rodríguez	2	7	4.38	78	0	3	72.0	65	37	35	31	72
John Axford	5	8	4.67	75	0	35	69.1	61	42	36	39	93
Kameron Loe	6	5	4.61	70	0	2	68.1	78	41	35	20	55
José Veras	5	4	3.63	72	0	1	67.0	61	29	27	40	79
Manny Parra	2	3	5.06	62	0	0	58.2	62	39	33	35	61
Mark Rogers	3	1	3.92	7	7	0	39.0	36	17	17	14	41
Tim Dillard	0	2	4.38	34	0	0	37.0	45	21	18	14	29
Liván Hernández	3	0	7.68	26	0	0	36.1	44	31	31	8	29
Jim Henderson	1	3	3.52	36	0	3	30.2	26	12	12	13	45
Wily Peralta	2	1	2.48	6	5	0	29.0	24	8	8	11	23
Tyler Thornburg	0	0	4.50	8	3	0	22.0	24	11	11	7	20
Brandon Kintzler	3	0	3.78	14	0	0	16.2	18	7	7	7	14
Mike McClendon	0	0	6.43	9	0	0	14.0	20	11	10	5	4
Josh Stinson	0	0	0.96	6	1	0	9.1	7	1	1	5	3
Chris Narveson	1	1	7.00	2	2	0	9.0	10	8	7	4	5
Vinnie Chulk	1	0	10.00	7	0	0	9.0	17	10	10	4	10
Juan Pérez	0	1	5.14	10	0	0	7.0	6	4	4	8	10
**Team totals**	**83**	**79**	**4.22**	**162**	**162**	**44**	**1453.2**	**1458**	**733**	**682**	**525**	**1402**

=== Game log ===
2012 game log
April (11–12) – home (6–6) – road (5–6)

#	Date	Opponent	Score	Win	Loss	Save	Attendance	Record
1	April 6	Cardinals	5–11	García (1–0)	**Gallardo** (0–1)		46,086	0–1
2	April 7	Cardinals	6–0	**Greinke** (1–0)	Wainwright (0–1)		42,084	1–1
3	April 8	Cardinals	3–9	Lynn (1–0)	**Wolf** (0–1)		33,211	1–2
4	April 9	@ Cubs	7–5	**Marcum** (1–0)	Camp (0–1)	**Axford** (1)	38,136	2–2
5	April 10	@ Cubs	7–4	**Narveson** (1–0)	Maholm (0–1)	**Rodríguez** (1)	37,265	3–2
6	April 11	@ Cubs	2–1	**Gallardo** (1–1)	Dempster (0–1)	**Axford** (2)	34,044	4–2
7	April 12	@ Cubs	0–8	Garza (1–0)	**Greinke** (1–1)		36,311	4–3
8	April 13	@ Braves	8–10	Venters (1–0)	**Rodríguez** (0–1)	Kimbrel (3)	50,635	4–4
9	April 14	@ Braves	1–2	Minor (1–1)	**Marcum** (1–1)	Kimbrel (4)	37,438	4–5
10	April 15	@ Braves	4–7	Beachy (1–1)	**Narveson** (1–1)		30,831	4–6
11	April 17	Dodgers	5–4	**Veras** (1–0)	Guerra (1–1)		27,159	5–6
12	April 18	Dodgers	3–2 (10)	**Loe** (1–0)	Guerrier (0–1)		30,189	6–6
13	April 19	Dodgers	3–4	Harang (1–1)	**Wolf** (0–2)	Guerra (6)	30,091	6–7
14	April 20	Rockies	3–4	Belisle (1–0)	**Axford** (0–1)	Betancourt (4)	39,188	6–8
15	April 21	Rockies	9–4	**Veras** (2–0)	Rogers (0–1)		43,565	7–8
16	April 22	Rockies	1–4	Guthrie (2–1)	**Rodríguez** (0–2)	Betancourt (5)	42,611	7–9
17	April 23	Astros	6–5	**Greinke** (2–1)	Harrell (1–1)	**Axford** (3)	36,291	8–9
18	April 24	Astros	9–6	**Wolf** (1–2)	Norris (1–1)	**Axford** (4)	38,686	9–9
19	April 25	Astros	5–7	López (2–0)	**Veras** (2–1)	Myers (3)	26,778	9–10
20	April 27	@ Cardinals	1–13	Westbrook (3–1)	**Gallardo** (1–2)		43,063	9–11
21	April 28	@ Cardinals	3–7	Lohse (4–0)	**Estrada** (0–1)		42,586	9–12
22	April 29	@ Cardinals	3–2	**Greinke** (3–1)	García (2–1)	**Axford** (5)	45,824	10–12
23	April 30	@ Padres	8–3	**Wolf** (2–2)	Wieland (0–4)		16,218	11–12

May (12–16) – home (5–7) – road (7–9)

#	Date	Opponent	Score	Win	Loss	Save	Attendance	Record
24	May 1	@ Padres	0–2	Cashner (2–1)	**Rodríguez** (0–3)	Street (4)	19,260	11–13
25	May 2	@ Padres	0–5	Suppan (1–0)	**Gallardo** (1–3)		15,786	11–14
26	May 4	@ Giants	6–4	**Loe** (2–0)	Hensley (1–3)	**Axford** (6)	41,082	12–14
27	May 5	@ Giants	2–5	Bumgarner (5–1)	**Wolf** (2–3)	Casilla (5)	41,135	12–15
28	May 6	@ Giants	3–4 (11)	López (3–0)	**Dillard** (0–1)		41,796	12–16
29	May 7	Reds	1–6	Arroyo (2–1)	**Estrada** (0–2)		27,157	12–17
30	May 8	Reds	8–3	**Gallardo** (2–3)	Bailey (1–3)		28,108	13–17
31	May 9	Reds	1–2	Chapman (3–0)	**Axford** (0–2)	Ondrusek (1)	27,090	13–18
32	May 11	Cubs	8–7 (13)	**Chulk** (1–0)	Castillo (0–1)		40,097	14–18
33	May 12	Cubs	8–2	**Marcum** (2–1)	Volstad (0–5)		42,339	15–18
34	May 13	Cubs	2–8	Camp (1–1)	**Loe** (2–1)		42,167	15–19
35	May 14	@ Mets	1–3	Batista (1–1)	**Gallardo** (2–4)	Francisco (9)	20,061	15–20
36	May 15	@ Mets	8–0	**Greinke** (4–1)	Gee (2–3)		22,268	16–20
37	May 16	@ Astros	3–8	Norris (4–1)	**Wolf** (2–4)		15,453	16–21
38	May 17	@ Astros	0–4	Happ (3–3)	**Marcum** (2–2)		15,173	16–22
39	May 18	Twins	3–11	Diamond (3–0)	**Estrada** (0–3)		32,421	16–23
40	May 19	Twins	4–5 (11)	Gray (3–0)	**Parra** (0–1)	Capps (9)	42,398	16–24
41	May 20	Twins	16–4	**Greinke** (5–1)	Marquis (2–4)		33,064	17–24
42	May 21	Giants	3–4 (14)	Casilla (1–2)	**Pérez** (0–1)		31,644	17–25
43	May 22	Giants	4–6	Cain (4–2)	**Marcum** (2–3)	Casilla (11)	30,451	17–26
44	May 23	Giants	8–5	**Veras** (3–1)	Zito (3–2)	**Axford** (7)	37,691	18–26
45	May 25	@ Diamondbacks	7–1	**Gallardo** (3–4)	Kennedy (3–5)		35,478	19–26
46	May 26	@ Diamondbacks	5–8	Miley (6–1)	**Greinke** (5–2)	Putz (10)	30,184	19–27
47	May 27	@ Diamondbacks	3–4	Shaw (1–2)	**Veras** (3–2)	Putz (11)	33,481	19–28
48	May 28	@ Dodgers	3–2	**Marcum** (3–3)	Harang (3–3)	**Axford** (8)	38,016	20–28
49	May 29	@ Dodgers	2–1	**Fiers** (1–0)	Eovaldi (0–1)	**Axford** (9)	51,137	21–28
50	May 30	@ Dodgers	6–3	**Gallardo** (4–4)	Kershaw (4–3)	**Axford** (10)	25,509	22–28
51	May 31	@ Dodgers	6–2	**Greinke** (6–2)	Billingsley (2–4)		26,773	23–28

June (12–14) – home (8–6) – road (4–8)

#	Date	Opponent	Score	Win	Loss	Save	Attendance	Record
52	June 1	Pirates	2–8	Correia (2–5)	**Wolf** (2–5)		33,055	23–29
53	June 2	Pirates	5–1	**Marcum** (4–3)	Bédard (3–6)		39,603	24–29
54	June 3	Pirates	5–6	McDonald (5–2)	**Fiers** (1–1)	Hanrahan (14)	34,334	24–30
55	June 5	Cubs	0–10	Dempster (1–3)	**Gallardo** (4–5)		28,071	24–31
56	June 6	Cubs	8–0	**Greinke** (7–2)	Maholm (4–5)		27,112	25–31
57	June 7	Cubs	4–3 (10)	**Axford** (1–2)	Coleman (0–1)		30,123	26–31
58	June 8	Padres	9–5	**Marcum** (5–3)	Vólquez (2–6)		32,759	27–31
59	June 9	Padres	2–5	Ohlendorf (1–0)	**Fiers** (1–2)	Street (5)	41,604	27–32
60	June 10	Padres	6–5	**Gallardo** (5–5)	Bass (2–6)	**Veras** (1)	43,021	28–32
61	June 12	@ Royals	1–2	Holland (2–2)	**Rodríguez** (0–4)	Broxton (15)	24,258	28–33
62	June 13	@ Royals	3–4 (11)	Collins (3–0)	**Loe** (2–2)		17,885	28–34
63	June 14	@ Royals	3–4	Collins (4–0)	**Axford** (1–3)		21,869	28–35
64	June 15	@ Twins	5–3	**Loe** (3–2)	Capps (1–4)	**Axford** (11)	37,295	29–35
65	June 16	@ Twins	6–2	**Fiers** (2–2)	Hendriks (0–3)		37,698	30–35
66	June 17	@ Twins	4–5 (15)	Swarzak (1–4)	**Dillard** (0–2)		39,206	30–36
67	June 18	Blue Jays	7–6	**Loe** (4–2)	Coello (0–1)	**Axford** (12)	32,223	31–36
68	June 19	Blue Jays	9–10	Oliver (1–2)	**Axford** (1–4)	Janssen (7)	36,334	31–37
69	June 20	Blue Jays	8–3	**Gallardo** (6–5)	Carreño (0–2)		33,077	32–37
70	June 22	@ White Sox	1–0 (10)	**Greinke** (8–2)	Crain (1–1)	**Axford** (13)	22,798	33–37
71	June 23	@ White Sox	6–8	Crain (2–1)	**Veras** (3–3)	Reed (9)	30,337	33–38
72	June 24	@ White Sox	0–1 (10)	Bruney (1–0)	**Parra** (0–2)		26,545	33–39
73	June 25	@ Reds	1–3	Latos (6–2)	**Gallardo** (6–6)		34,485	33–40
74	June 26	@ Reds	3–4	Marshall (3–4)	**Axford** (1–5)	Chapman (9)	32,986	33–41
75	June 27	@ Reds	8–4	**Greinke** (9–2)	Bailey (5–6)		28,906	34–41
76	June 29	Diamondbacks	3–9	Kennedy (6–7)	**Wolf** (2–6)		38,030	34–42
77	June 30	Diamondbacks	10–2	**Fiers** (3–2)	Miley (9–4)		41,647	35–42

July (12–14) – home (10–7) – road (2–7)

#	Date	Opponent	Score	Win	Loss	Save	Attendance	Record
78	July 1	Diamondbacks	2–1	**Axford** (2–5)	Corbin (2–4)		38,605	36–42
79	July 2	Marlins	6–5	**Rodríguez** (1–4)	Webb (3–2)	**Axford** (14)	28,674	37–42
80	July 3	Marlins	13–12 (10)	**Hernández** (2–1)	Bell (2–4)		33,178	38–42
81	July 4	Marlins	6–7 (10)	LeBlanc (1–0)	**Parra** (0–3)	Bell (18)	31,910	38–43
82	July 5	Marlins	0–4	Buehrle (8–8)	**Fiers** (3–3)		27,443	38–44
83	July 6	@ Astros	7–1	**Gallardo** (7–6)	Happ (6–9)		23,430	39–44
84	July 7	@ Astros	3–6	Rodríguez (7–6)	**Greinke** (9–3)	Myers (18)	23,027	39–45
85	July 8	@ Astros	5–3 (10)	**Parra** (1–3)	Rodriguez (1–8)	**Axford** (15)	16,966	40–45
86	July 13	Pirates	10–7	**Rodríguez** (2–4)	Watson (4–1)		35,025	41–45
87	July 14	Pirates	4–6	Correia (6–6)	**Loe** (4–3)	Hanrahan (24)	42,029	41–46
88	July 15	Pirates	4–1	**Gallardo** (8–6)	Burnett (10–3)	**Axford** (16)	35,430	42–46
89	July 16	Cardinals	2–3	Motte (4–3)	**Axford** (2–6)		30,128	42–47
90	July 17	Cardinals	3–2	**Wolf** (3–6)	Kelly (1–2)	**Rodríguez** (2)	30,491	43–47
91	July 18	Cardinals	4–3	**Axford** (3–6)	Wainwright (7–10)	**Rodríguez** (3)	37,753	44–47
92	July 20	@ Reds	1–3	Bailey (9–6)	**Estrada** (0–4)	Chapman (16)	30,247	44–48
93	July 21	@ Reds	2–6	Arroyo (5–6)	**Gallardo** (8–7)		40,090	44–49
94	July 22	@ Reds	1–2	Cueto (12–5)	**Fiers** (3–4)	Chapman (17)	32,884	44–50
95	July 23	@ Phillies	6–7	Savery (1–2)	**Rodríguez** (2–5)		43,717	44–51
96	July 24	@ Phillies	6–7	Schwimer (1–1)	**Loe** (4–4)	Papelbon (22)	43,745	44–52
97	July 25	@ Phillies	6–7 (10)	Schwimer (2–1)	**Rodríguez** (2–6)		44,715	44–53
98	July 26	Nationals	2–8	Jackson (6–6)	**Gallardo** (8–8)		33,176	44–54
99	July 27	Nationals	6–0	**Fiers** (4–4)	Detwiler (5–4)		35,858	45–54
100	July 28	Nationals	1–4	Zimmermann (8–6)	**Wolf** (3–7)	Clippard (19)	41,890	45–55
101	July 29	Nationals	10–11 (11)	Stammen (4–1)	**Veras** (3–4)	Clippard (20)	44,663	45–56
102	July 30	Astros	8–7	**Hernández** (3–1)	Cordero (3–8)	**Axford** (17)	28,131	46–56
103	July 31	Astros	10–1	**Gallardo** (9–8)	Keuchel (1–4)		30,011	47–56

August (16–12) – home (10–2) – road (6–10)

#	Date	Opponent	Score	Win	Loss	Save	Attendance	Record
104	August 1	Astros	13–4	**Fiers** (5–4)	Lyles (2–8)		32,217	48–56
105	August 3	@ Cardinals	3–9	Kelly (2–4)	**Wolf** (3–8)		41,505	48–57
106	August 4	@ Cardinals	1–6	Wainwright (9–10)	**Rogers** (0–1)		42,036	48–58
107	August 5	@ Cardinals	0–3	Lohse (12–2)	**Estrada** (0–5)	Motte (24)	40,274	48–59
108	August 6	Reds	6–3	**Gallardo** (10–8)	Arroyo (7–7)	**Axford** (18)	31,319	49–59
109	August 7	Reds	3–1	**Fiers** (6–4)	Cueto (14–6)	**Henderson** (1)	41,213	50–59
110	August 8	Reds	3–2	**Axford** (4–6)	Broxton (2–3)	**Henderson** (2)	33,788	51–59
111	August 10	@ Astros	3–4	López (4–1)	**Axford** (4–7)		21,025	51–60
112	August 11	@ Astros	5–6 (10)	López (5–1)	**Henderson** (0–1)		17,942	51–61
113	August 12	@ Astros	5–3	**Gallardo** (11–8)	Lyles (2–9)	**Loe** (1)	19,235	52–61
114	August 13	@ Rockies	6–9	Francis (4–4)	**Fiers** (6–5)		26,821	52–62
115	August 14	@ Rockies	6–8	Chatwood (3–2)	**Wolf** (3–9)	Betancourt (21)	28,036	52–63
116	August 15	@ Rockies	6–7	Harris (1–0)	**Henderson** (0–2)		23,411	52–64
117	August 16	Phillies	7–4	**Hernández** (4–1)	Lindblom (2–3)	**Henderson** (3)	30,117	53–64
118	August 17	Phillies	6–2	**Gallardo** (12–8)	Worley (6–8)		39,163	54–64
119	August 18	Phillies	3–4	Hamels (14–6)	**Fiers** (6–6)	Papelbon (27)	43,386	54–65
120	August 19	Phillies	0–8	Kendrick (6–9)	**Wolf** (3–10)		42,224	54–66
121	August 20	Cubs	9–5	**Rogers** (1–1)	Germano (2–3)		28,776	55–66
122	August 21	Cubs	5–2	**Estrada** (1–5)	Rusin (0–1)	**Axford** (19)	29,179	56–66
123	August 22	Cubs	3–2	**Gallardo** (13–8)	Wood (4–10)	**Axford** (20)	30,743	57–66
124	August 24	@ Pirates	6–5	**Fiers** (7–6)	Rodríguez (8–13)	**Loe** (2)	37,197	58–66
125	August 25	@ Pirates	0–4	Karstens (5–3)	**Marcum** (5–4)		37,460	58–67
126	August 26	@ Pirates	7–0	**Rogers** (2–1)	Bédard (7–14)		36,626	59–67
127	August 27	@ Cubs	15–4	**Estrada** (2–5)	Germano (2–4)		32,541	60–67
128	August 28	@ Cubs	4–1	**Gallardo** (14–8)	Wood (4–11)	**Axford** (21)	30,017	61–67
129	August 29	@ Cubs	3–1	**Fiers** (8–6)	Samardzija (8–12)	**Axford** (22)	33,271	62–67
130	August 30	@ Cubs	11–12	Mármol (2–2)	**Rodríguez** (2–7)		28,859	62–68
131	August 31	Pirates	9–3	**Rogers** (3–1)	Karstens (5–4)		33,877	63–68

September (18–10) – home (8–3) – road (10–7)

#	Date	Opponent	Score	Win	Loss	Save	Attendance	Record
132	September 1	Pirates	3–2	**Axford** (5–7)	Hanrahan (4–1)		32,060	64–68
133	September 2	Pirates	12–8	**Loe** (5–4)	McDonald (12–7)	**Axford** (23)	32,728	65–68
134	September 3	@ Marlins	3–7	Nolasco (11–12)	**Fiers** (8–7)	Cishek (12)	22,391	65–69
135	September 4	@ Marlins	8–4	**Loe** (6–4)	Dunn (0–2)	**Axford** (24)	23,403	66–69
136	September 5	@ Marlins	8–5	**Peralta** (1–0)	Eovaldi (4–11)	**Axford** (25)	22,288	67–69
137	September 6	@ Marlins	2–6	Johnson (8–11)	**Estrada** (2–6)		18,707	67–70
138	September 7	@ Cardinals	5–4 (13)	**Kintzler** (1–0)	Lynn (13–7)	**Axford** (26)	38,648	68–70
139	September 8	@ Cardinals	6–3	**Fiers** (9–7)	Westbrook (13–11)	**Axford** (27)	40,422	69–70
140	September 9	@ Cardinals	4–5 (10)	Lynn (14–7)	**Loe** (6–5)		39,919	69–71
141	September 10	Braves	4–1	**Veras** (4–4)	Venters (5–4)	**Axford** (28)	34,395	70–71
142	September 11	Braves	5–0	**Estrada** (3–6)	Hudson (14–6)		27,382	71–71
143	September 12	Braves	8–2	**Gallardo** (15–8)	Maholm (12–10)		37,847	72–71
144	September 14	Mets	3–7	Niese (11–9)	**Fiers** (9–8)		38,216	72–72
145	September 15	Mets	9–6	**Kintzler** (2–0)	Mejía (0–1)		38,108	73–72
146	September 16	Mets	3–0	**Peralta** (2–0)	Young (4–8)	**Axford** (29)	38,677	74–72
147	September 18	@ Pirates	6–0	**Gallardo** (16–8)	Burnett (15–8)		15,492	75–72
148	September 19	@ Pirates	3–1	**Estrada** (4–6)	McPherson (0–1)	**Axford** (30)	15,337	76–72
149	September 20	@ Pirates	9–7	**Parra** (2–3)	Resop (1–4)	**Axford** (31)	14,697	77–72
150	September 21	@ Nationals	4–2	**Veras** (5–4)	Clippard (2–6)	**Axford** (32)	30,382	78–72
151	September 22	@ Nationals	4–10	Gonzalez (20–8)	**Peralta** (2–1)		40,493	78–73
152	September 23	@ Nationals	6–2	**Kintzler** (3–0)	Mattheus (5–3)	**Axford** (33)	33,111	79–73
153	September 24	@ Nationals	2–12	Zimmermann (12–8)	**Estrada** (4–7)		25,302	79–74
154	September 25	@ Reds	2–4	Cueto (19–9)	**Fiers** (9–9)	Chapman (36)	18,155	79–75
155	September 26	@ Reds	8–1	**Marcum** (6–4)	Arroyo (12–9)		20,570	80–75
156	September 27	@ Reds	1–2	Broxton (4–3)	**Axford** (5–8)		23,411	80–76
157	September 28	Astros	6–7	González (3–1)	**Gallardo** (16–9)	López (9)	41,716	80–77
158	September 29	Astros	9–5	**Estrada** (5–7)	Keuchel (3–8)		34,294	81–77
159	September 30	Astros	0–7	Lyles (5–12)	**Fiers** (9–10)		38,443	81–78

October (2–1) – home (2–1) – road (0–0)

#	Date	Opponent	Score	Win	Loss	Save	Attendance	Record
160	October 1	Padres	5–3	**Marcum** (7–4)	Richard (14–14)	**Axford** (34)	30,398	82–78
161	October 2	Padres	4–3	**Henderson** (1–2)	Bass (2–8)	**Axford** (35)	30,714	83–78
162	October 3	Padres	6–7	Layne (2–0)	**Henderson** (1–3)	Gregerson (9)	34,451	83–79

- Brewers win
- Brewers loss
- Postponement
- Bold: Brewers team member

== Transactions ==
- December 7, 2011: Signed RP Francisco Rodriguez.
- December 12, 2011: Signed SS Alex Gonzalez.
- December 13, 2011: Traded 3B Casey McGehee to Pirates for RP José Veras.
- December 14, 2011: Signed 3B Aramis Ramírez.
- January 9, 2012: Signed 3B Brooks Conrad.
- January 17, 2012: Signed LF Norichika Aoki.

== Farm system ==
The Brewers' farm system consisted of seven minor league affiliates in 2012. The Wisconsin Timber Rattlers won the Midwest League championship.

Level	Team	League	Manager
Triple-A	Nashville Sounds	Pacific Coast League	Mike Guerrero
Double-A	Huntsville Stars	Southern League	Darnell Coles
Class A-Advanced	Brevard County Manatees	Florida State League	Joe Ayrault
Class A	Wisconsin Timber Rattlers	Midwest League	Matt Erickson
Rookie	Helena Brewers	Pioneer League	Jeff Isom
Rookie	AZL Brewers	Arizona League	Tony Diggs
Rookie	DSL Brewers	Dominican Summer League	Néstor Corredor
