= Matt Hague =

American baseball player & coach (born 1985)

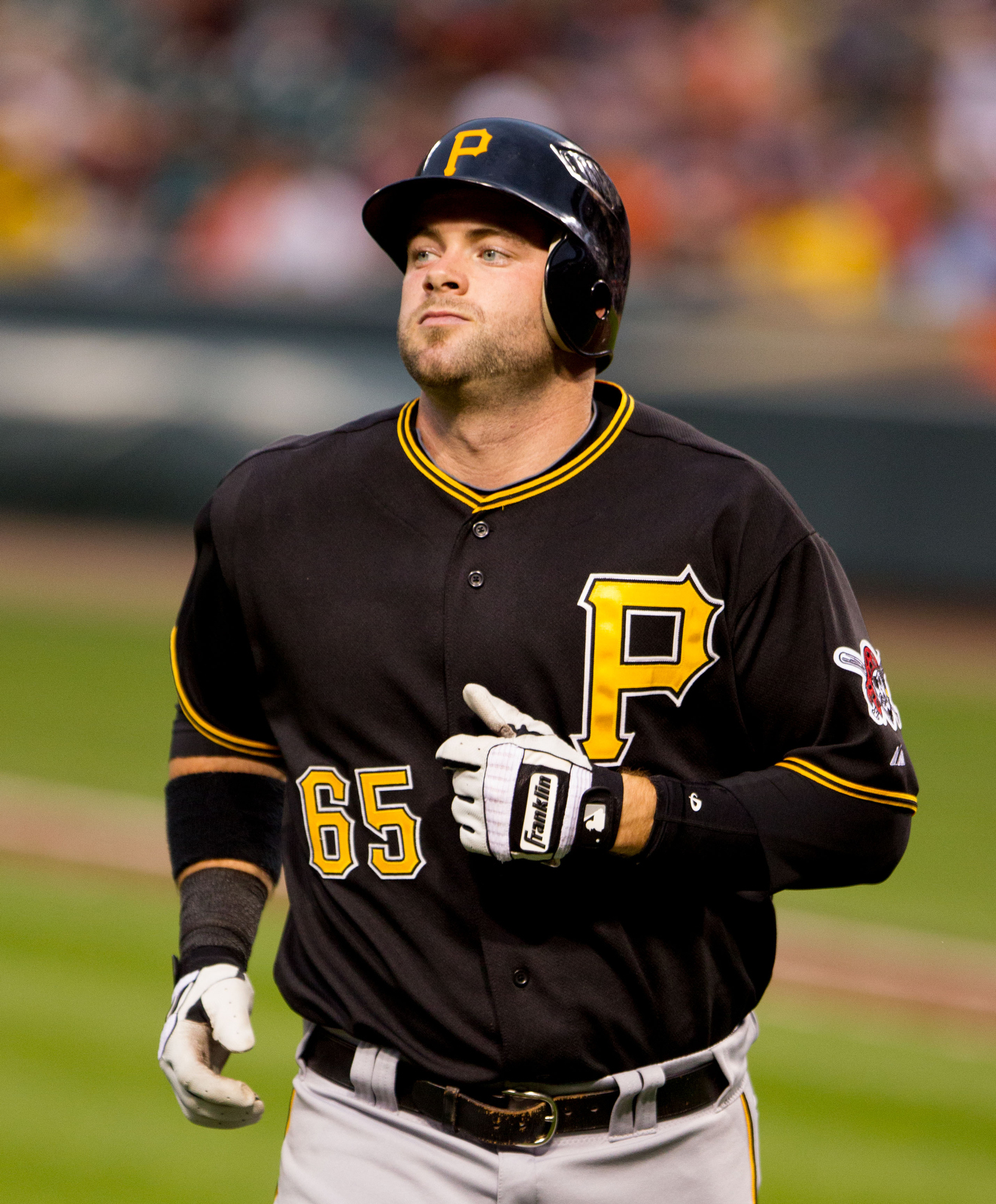
- Hague with the Pittsburgh Pirates in 2012

Pittsburgh Pirates – No. 59
- First baseman
- Born: August 20, 1985 (age 41); Bellevue, Washington, U.S.
- Batted: Right Threw: Right

Professional debut
- MLB: April 7, 2012, for the Pittsburgh Pirates
- NPB: March 25, 2016, for the Hanshin Tigers

Last appearance
- MLB: October 1, 2015, for the Toronto Blue Jays
- NPB: June 3, 2016, for the Hanshin Tigers

MLB statistics
- Batting average: .226
- Home runs: 0
- Runs batted in: 7

NPB statistics
- Batting average: .231
- Home runs: 2
- Runs batted in: 11
- Stats at Baseball Reference

Teams
- As player: Pittsburgh Pirates (2012, 2014); Toronto Blue Jays (2015); Hanshin Tigers (2016); As coach: Toronto Blue Jays (2024); Pittsburgh Pirates (2025–present)

Matthew Donald Hague (born August 20, 1985) is an American professional baseball first baseman and coach. He is the hitting coach for the Pittsburgh Pirates of Major League Baseball (MLB).

Hague played college baseball at the University of Washington and Oklahoma State. Between 2012 and 2016, he played in MLB for the Pirates and Toronto Blue Jays, and in Nippon Professional Baseball (NPB) for the Hanshin Tigers. He has coached for the Blue Jays before being hired by the Pirates.

== Amateur career ==
Hague was raised in Kent, Washington and attended Kentwood High School in Covington, Washington. For his contributions to the high school baseball team, which finished second in the state of Washington, he was named to the Class 4A All-State First Team as a pitcher and Second Team as an outfielder.

Hague began his college baseball career at the University of Washington in 2005, where he played for the Washington Huskies baseball team for three seasons. He began his tenure with the Huskies as a backup third baseman and outfielder, but he also pitched in relief. The Cleveland Indians drafted Hague in the 11th round (347th overall) of the 2007 Major League Baseball draft, but he opted not to sign. After the 2007 season, he played collegiate summer baseball with the Falmouth Commodores of the Cape Cod Baseball League and was named a league all-star. He transferred to Oklahoma State University–Stillwater for his senior season, where he played for the Oklahoma State Cowboys baseball team.

== Professional career ==
=== Pittsburgh Pirates ===
The Pittsburgh Pirates selected Hague in the ninth round, with the 264th overall pick, of the 2008 Major League Baseball draft as a third baseman. He began his professional career that season with the State College Spikes of the Low–A New York–Penn League, before he was promoted to the Hickory Crawdads of the Single–A South Atlantic League. In 2009, Hague played for the Lynchburg Hillcats of the High–A Carolina League, where he began playing first base. That year, he finished third in the Carolina League with a .293 batting average.

Hague was promoted to the Altoona Curve of the Double–A Eastern League in 2010, where he was named the team's Iron Man. Hague batted .309 with 12 home runs and 75 runs batted in (RBIs) during the 2011 season with the Triple-A Indianapolis Indians, leading the International League in hits and receiving midseason and postseason International League All-Star honors. However, he did not receive a September call-up to Pittsburgh as the team already had a number of first basemen and outfielders. He was added to the Pirates' 40-man roster to protect him from the Rule 5 draft after the 2011 season.

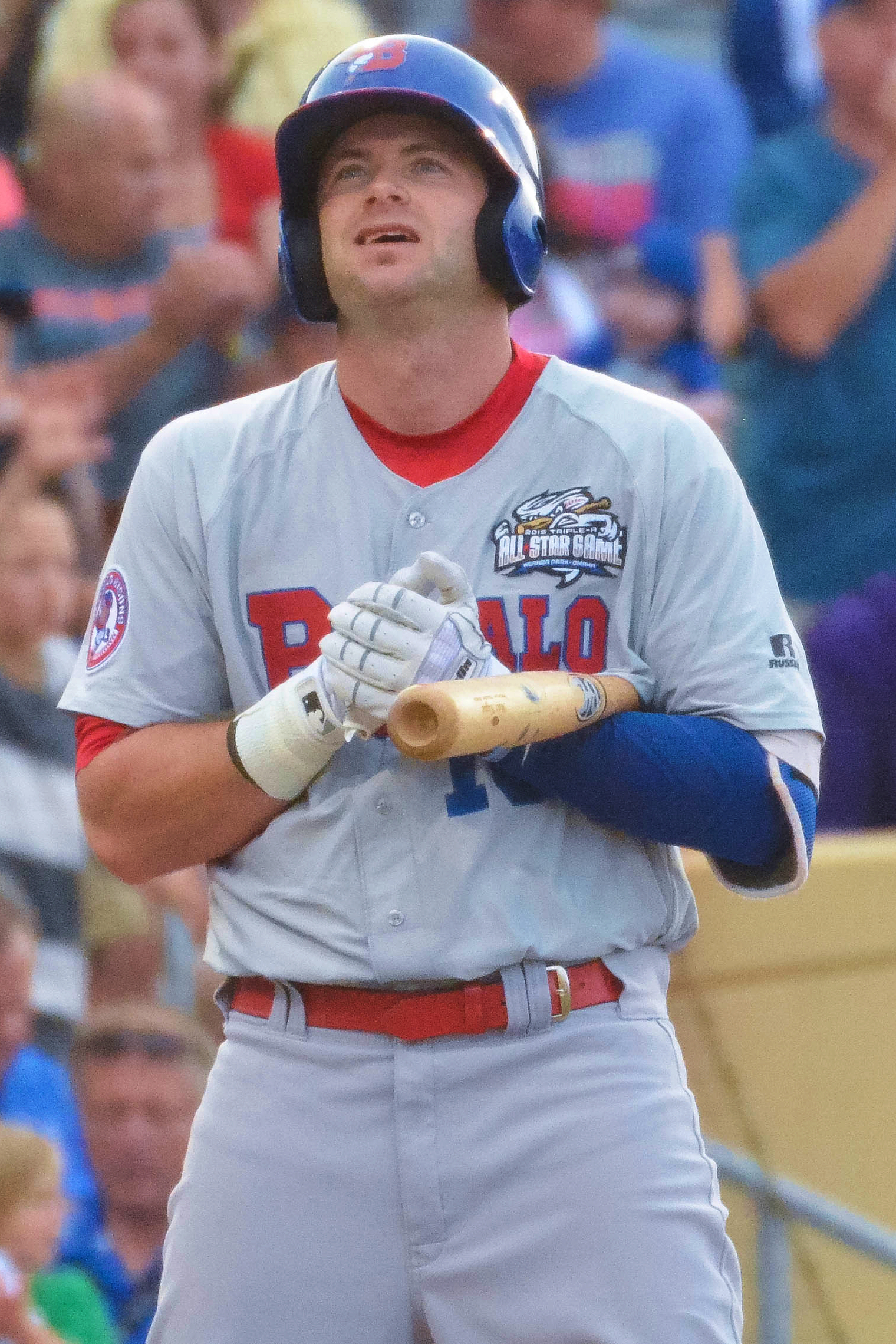
Hague at the 2015 Triple-A All-Star Game

After impressing the Pirates with his power in 2012 spring training, Hague made the Pirates' Opening Day roster. He made his MLB debut on April 7. He recorded his first MLB hit on April 8, a pinch-hit RBI single off Philadelphia Phillies pitcher Kyle Kendrick. He played in 30 games for the Pirates in 2012, batting .229 with seven RBIs and a stolen base. He spent the rest of the season with Indianapolis, where he batted .283 with four home runs, 54 RBIs, and three stolen bases. He also spent the entire 2013 season with Indianapolis, batting .285 with eight home runs, 69 RBIs, and four stolen bases. He began the 2014 season with Indianapolis, playing in 93 games and batting .267, with 14 home runs, 66 RBIs, and a stolen base. He also appeared in three games for Pittsburgh, going 0-for-2 at the plate. The Pirates placed him on waivers.

=== Toronto Blue Jays ===
On August 18, 2014, the Toronto Blue Jays claimed Hague off waivers and assigned him to the Class AAA Buffalo Bisons of the International League. In 13 games, he batted .377 for Buffalo with a home run and 10 RBIs. The Blue Jays designated him for assignment on September 2, but added him back to their 40-man roster on September 28.

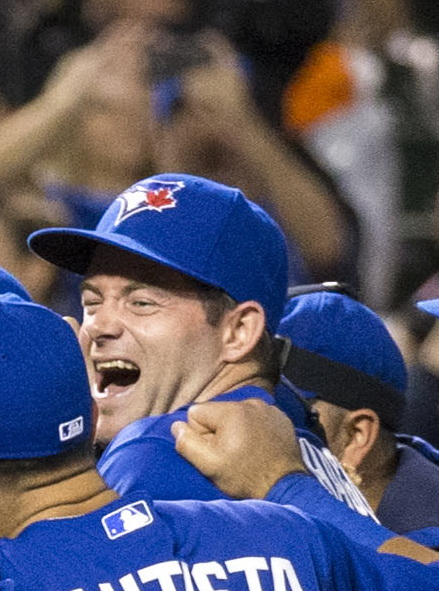
Hague at the 2015 postseason

Hague spent most of the 2015 season with Buffalo and played for the International League in the 2015 Triple-A All-Star Game on July 15. On August 17, the Blue Jays called Hague up. He debuted for Toronto on August 22, coming on as a pinch hitter against the Los Angeles Angels of Anaheim and striking out. Following the game, Toronto optioned him back to Buffalo. On September 1, the International League named him the 2015 Most Valuable Player; for the season, he had batted .338 with 11 homers and 92 RBI and stole five bases for the Bisons.

The Blue Jays recalled Hague on September 8 at the conclusion of the minor-league season to provide an extra bat off the bench during the Blue Jays' pennant race. He finished the season having appeared in 10 games with the Blue Jays, batting 3-for-12 (.250) with a double.

=== Hanshin Tigers ===
Following the 2015 season, the Blue Jays reached an agreement to sell Hague's contract to the Hanshin Tigers of Nippon Professional Baseball for $300,000. He signed with them on November 30, 2015, and spent the 2016 season playing in Japan for Hanshin.

=== Minnesota Twins ===
On December 21, 2016, Hague signed a minor league contract with the Minnesota Twins. He received an invitation to 2017 spring training. The Twins assigned him to the Triple–A Rochester Red Wings of the International League, where he spent the entire 2017 season, batting .297 with 10 home runs, 65 RBI, and eight stolen bases for the Red Wings. Hague elected free agency following the season on November 6, 2017.

=== Seattle Mariners ===
On December 12, 2017, Hague signed a minor league contract with the Seattle Mariners. At the beginning of the 2018 season, the Mariners assigned him to the Class AAA Tacoma Rainiers of the Pacific Coast League, where he appeared in 17 games and batted .226 with 13 RBI before the Mariners released him on April 26, 2018.

=== Washington Nationals ===
On April 27, 2018, Hague signed a minor-league contract with the Washington Nationals. The Nationals assigned him to the Class AAA Syracuse Chiefs of the International League. He played in 28 games for the Chiefs, hitting .242 with five doubles, a home run, and seven RBIs before the Nationals released him on June 13, 2018.

== Coaching career ==
=== Toronto Blue Jays ===
On January 31, 2020, Hague joined the Toronto Blue Jays organization as a hitting coach for the High–A Dunedin Blue Jays. On March 8, 2021, Hague was named the hitting coach for the Double–A affiliate of the Blue Jays, the New Hampshire Fisher Cats. On February 15, 2023, Hague was announced as the new hitting coach for the Triple–A Buffalo Bisons.

On January 14, 2024, the Blue Jays promoted Hague to the role of major league assistant hitting coach.

=== Pittsburgh Pirates ===
On November 13, 2024, the Pittsburgh Pirates hired Hague to serve as their hitting coach.

== Personal life ==
Hague and his wife Erica (née Wise) were married in New Orleans, Louisiana, in November 2015.
