= 2012 Miami Marlins season =

2012 Miami Marlins
- League: National League
- Division: East
- Ballpark: Marlins Park
- City: Miami, Florida
- Record: 69–93 (.426)
- Divisional place: 5th
- Owners: Jeffrey Loria
- President of baseball operations: Larry Beinfest
- General managers: Michael Hill
- Managers: Ozzie Guillén
- Television: Fox Sports Florida; Sun Sports (English: Rich Waltz, Tommy Hutton) (Spanish: Raul Striker, Jr., Cookie Rojas)
- Radio: Miami Marlins Radio Network (English) (Dave Van Horne, Glenn Geffner); WAQI (Spanish) (Felo Ramírez, Luis Quintana)

The 2012 Miami Marlins season was the 20th season for the Major League Baseball franchise. The Marlins moved into Marlins Park for the 2012 season; as part of the agreement, they changed their name from the "Florida Marlins" to the "Miami Marlins". They failed to make the playoffs for the ninth consecutive season.

== Season standings ==
=== NL East standings ===
NL East
| Team | W | L | Pct. | GB | Home | Road |
|---|---|---|---|---|---|---|
| Washington Nationals | 98 | 64 | .605 | — | 50‍–‍31 | 48‍–‍33 |
| Atlanta Braves | 94 | 68 | .580 | 4 | 48‍–‍33 | 46‍–‍35 |
| Philadelphia Phillies | 81 | 81 | .500 | 17 | 40‍–‍41 | 41‍–‍40 |
| New York Mets | 74 | 88 | .457 | 24 | 36‍–‍45 | 38‍–‍43 |
| Miami Marlins | 69 | 93 | .426 | 29 | 38‍–‍43 | 31‍–‍50 |

=== NL Wild Card ===
Division leaders
| Team | W | L | Pct. |
|---|---|---|---|
| Washington Nationals | 98 | 64 | .605 |
| Cincinnati Reds | 97 | 65 | .599 |
| San Francisco Giants | 94 | 68 | .580 |

Wild Card teams (Top 2 teams qualify for postseason)
| Team | W | L | Pct. | GB |
|---|---|---|---|---|
| Atlanta Braves | 94 | 68 | .580 | +6 |
| St. Louis Cardinals | 88 | 74 | .543 | — |
| Los Angeles Dodgers | 86 | 76 | .531 | 2 |
| Milwaukee Brewers | 83 | 79 | .512 | 5 |
| Philadelphia Phillies | 81 | 81 | .500 | 7 |
| Arizona Diamondbacks | 81 | 81 | .500 | 7 |
| Pittsburgh Pirates | 79 | 83 | .488 | 9 |
| San Diego Padres | 76 | 86 | .469 | 12 |
| New York Mets | 74 | 88 | .457 | 14 |
| Miami Marlins | 69 | 93 | .426 | 19 |
| Colorado Rockies | 64 | 98 | .395 | 24 |
| Chicago Cubs | 61 | 101 | .377 | 27 |
| Houston Astros | 55 | 107 | .340 | 33 |

== Record vs. opponents ==
2012 National League record Source: MLB Standings Grid – 2012
| Team | AZ | ATL | CHC | CIN | COL | MIA | HOU | LAD | MIL | NYM | PHI | PIT | SD | SF | STL | WSH | AL |
|---|---|---|---|---|---|---|---|---|---|---|---|---|---|---|---|---|---|
| Arizona | – | 2–5 | 5–4 | 2–5 | 9–7 | 5–3 | 6–0 | 12–6 | 3–3 | 3–4 | 2–4 | 3–4 | 7–11 | 9–9 | 1–5 | 2–4 | 9–6 |
| Atlanta | 5–2 | – | 3–4 | 1–5 | 6–1 | 14–4 | 4–2 | 3–3 | 3–3 | 12–6 | 12–6 | 3–4 | 4–3 | 3–4 | 5–1 | 8–10 | 8–10 |
| Chicago | 4–5 | 4–3 | – | 4–12 | 2–4 | 8–5 | 2–4 | 2–4 | 4–13 | 4–2 | 2–4 | 8–8 | 3–3 | 1–6 | 7–10 | 1–6 | 5–10 |
| Cincinnati | 5–2 | 5–1 | 12–4 | – | 5–1 | 10–5 | 2–4 | 3–3 | 9–6 | 6–2 | 3–4 | 11–7 | 6–2 | 4–3 | 6–7 | 2–5 | 7–8 |
| Colorado | 7–9 | 1–6 | 4–2 | 1–5 | – | 5–2 | 5–2 | 8–10 | 5–1 | 5–2 | 2–7 | 2–4 | 8–10 | 4–14 | 2–5 | 4–3 | 2–13 |
| Houston | 0–6 | 2–4 | 5–8 | 5–10 | 2–5 | – | 2–4 | 2–4 | 8–9 | 4–2 | 3–3 | 5–12 | 3–5 | 1–8 | 4–11 | 1–7 | 6–9 |
| Los Angeles | 6–12 | 3–3 | 4–2 | 4–2 | 10–8 | 4–2 | – | 4–2 | 1–6 | 4–3 | 5–2 | 6–1 | 11–7 | 8–10 | 6–5 | 4–2 | 6–9 |
| Miami | 3–5 | 4–14 | 4–2 | 3–3 | 4–3 | – | 4–2 | 2–4 | 4–4 | 4–12 | 8–10 | 1–4 | 5–1 | 5–2 | 2–5 | 9–9 | 5–13 |
| Milwaukee | 3–3 | 3–3 | 13–4 | 6–9 | 1–5 | 9–8 | 6–1 | 4–4 | – | 3–2 | 2–5 | 11–4 | 3–4 | 2–4 | 6–9 | 3–5 | 6–9 |
| New York | 4–3 | 6–12 | 2–4 | 2–6 | 2–5 | 2–4 | 3–4 | 12–4 | 2–3 | – | 10–8 | 5–2 | 4–3 | 4–4 | 4–3 | 4–14 | 8–7 |
| Philadelphia | 4–2 | 6–12 | 4–2 | 4–3 | 7–2 | 10–8 | 3–3 | 2–5 | 5–2 | 8–10 | – | 3–4 | 4–3 | 2–4 | 5–2 | 9–9 | 5–10 |
| Pittsburgh | 4–3 | 2–3 | 8–8 | 7–11 | 4–2 | 4–1 | 12–5 | 1–6 | 4–11 | 2–5 | 4–3 | – | 1–5 | 3–3 | 8–7 | 3–2 | 10–8 |
| San Diego | 11–7 | 3–4 | 3–3 | 2–6 | 10–8 | 5–3 | 7–11 | 1–5 | 4–3 | 3–4 | 3–4 | 5–1 | – | 6–12 | 3–3 | 2–3 | 8–7 |
| San Francisco | 9–9 | 4–3 | 6–1 | 3–4 | 14–4 | 2–5 | 8–1 | 10–8 | 4–2 | 4–4 | 4–2 | 3–3 | 12–6 | – | 3–3 | 1–5 | 7–8 |
| St. Louis | 5–1 | 1–5 | 10–7 | 7–6 | 5–2 | 11–4 | 5–6 | 5–2 | 9–6 | 3–4 | 3–4 | 7–8 | 3–3 | 3–3 | – | 3–4 | 8–7 |
| Washington | 4–2 | 10–8 | 6–1 | 5–2 | 3–4 | 7–1 | 2–4 | 9–9 | 5–3 | 14–4 | 9–9 | 2–3 | 3–2 | 5–1 | 4–3 | – | 10–8 |

== Game log ==
Legend
| | Marlins win |
| | Marlins loss |
| | Postponement |
| **Bold** | Marlins team member |

2012 game log
April (8–14)

| # | Date | Opponent | Score | Win | Loss | Save | Attendance | Record | Box |
|---|---|---|---|---|---|---|---|---|---|
| 1 | April 4 | Cardinals | L 1–4 | Lohse (1–0) | **Johnson** (0–1) | Motte (1) | 36,601 | 0–1 | |
| 2 | April 5 | @ Reds | L 0–4 | Cueto (1–0) | **Buehrle** (0–1) | | 42,956 | 0–2 | |
| 3 | April 7 | @ Reds | W 8–3 | **Nolasco** (1–0) | Latos 0–1 | | 41,662 | 1–2 | |
| 4 | April 8 | @ Reds | L 5–6 | Chapman (1–0) | **Bell** (0–1) | | 23,539 | 1–3 | |
| 5 | April 9 | @ Phillies | W 6–2 | **Sánchez** (1–0) | Hamels (0–1) | | 45,574 | 2–3 | |
| 6 | April 11 | @ Phillies | L 1–7 | Halladay (2–0) | **Johnson** (0–2) | | 45,359 | 2–4 | |
| 7 | April 12 | @ Phillies | L 1–3 | Blanton (1–1) | **Buehrle** (0–2) | Papelbon (2) | 44,751 | 2–5 | |
| 8 | April 13 | Astros | W 5–4 (11) | **Webb** (1–0) | Lyon (0–1) | | 30,169 | 3–5 | |
| 9 | April 14 | Astros | L 4–5 | Cruz (1–0) | **Bell** (0–2) | Myers (2) | 31,659 | 3–6 | |
| 10 | April 15 | Astros | W 5–4 (11) | **Gaudin** (1–0) | Carpenter (0–1) | | 34,232 | 4–6 | |
| 11 | April 17 | Cubs | W 5–2 | **Cishek** (1–0) | Dolis (0–1) | **Bell** (1) | 24,544 | 5–6 | |
| 12 | April 18 | Cubs | W 9–1 | **Buehrle** (1–2) | Garza (1–1) | | 25,723 | 6–6 | |
| 13 | April 19 | Cubs | W 5–3 | **Nolasco** (2–0) | Samardzija (2–1) | **Bell** (2) | 23,168 | 7–6 | |
| 14 | April 20 | @ Nationals | L 0–2 | Detwiler (2–0) | **Zambrano** (0–1) | Rodríguez (4) | 24,640 | 7–7 | |
| 15 | April 21 | @ Nationals | L 2–3 (10) | Gorzelanny (1–0) | **Mujica** (0–1) | | 26,745 | 7–8 | |
| – | April 22 | @ Nationals | Game Postponed (rain) (rescheduled for August 3) | | | | | | |
| 16 | April 24 | @ Mets | L 1–2 | Rauch (3–0) | **Mujica** (0–2) | Francisco (4) | 20,192 | 7–9 | |
| 17 | April 25 | @ Mets | L 1–5 | Dickey (3–1) | **Buehrle** (1–3) | | 20,623 | 7–10 | |
| 18 | April 26 | @ Mets | L 2–3 | Ramírez (2–1) | **Bell** (0–3) | | 20,660 | 7–11 | |
| 19 | April 27 | Diamondbacks | L 0–5 | Saunders (2–1) | **Zambrano** (0–2) | | 31,949 | 7–12 | |
| 20 | April 28 | Diamondbacks | W 3–2 | **Cishek** (2–0) | Ziegler (0–1) | | 33,525 | 8–12 | |
| 21 | April 29 | Diamondbacks | L 4–8 | Miley (3–0) | **Johnson** (0–3) | | 34,918 | 8–13 | |
| 22 | April 30 | Diamondbacks | L 5–9 | Corbin (1–0) | **Buehrle** (1–4) | | 31,006 | 8–14 | |

May (21–8)

| # | Date | Opponent | Score | Win | Loss | Save | Attendance | Record | Box |
|---|---|---|---|---|---|---|---|---|---|
| 23 | May 1 | @ Giants | W 2–1 | **Nolasco** (3–0) | Cain (1–2) | **Bell** (3) | 41,439 | 9–14 | |
| 24 | May 2 | @ Giants | W 3–2 (10) | **Cishek** (3–0) | Casilla (0–1) | | 41,575 | 10–14 | |
| 25 | May 3 | @ Giants | W 3–2 | **Sánchez** (2–0) | Vogelsong (0–2) | **Mujica** (1) | 41,159 | 11–14 | |
| 26 | May 4 | @ Padres | W 9–8 (12) | **Cishek** (4–0) | Spence (0–1) | | 29,201 | 12–14 | |
| 27 | May 5 | @ Padres | W 4–1 | **Buehrle** (2–4) | Richard (1–4) | | 25,076 | 13–14 | |
| 28 | May 6 | @ Padres | W 6–3 | **Nolasco** (4–0) | Cashner (2–2) | **Mujica** (2) | 33,572 | 14–14 | |
| 29 | May 7 | @ Astros | W 4–0 | **Zambrano** (1–2) | Rodríguez (3–3) | | 16,531 | 15–14 | |
| 30 | May 8 | @ Astros | L 2–3 | López (3–0) | **Webb** (1–1) | Myers (8) | 14,801 | 15–15 | |
| 31 | May 9 | @ Astros | W 5–3 (12) | **Webb** (2–1) | Carpenter (0–2) | | 16,072 | 16–15 | |
| 32 | May 11 | Mets | W 6–5 | **Bell** (1–3) | Francisco (1–2) | | 31,007 | 17–15 | |
| 33 | May 12 | Mets | L 3–9 | Dickey (5–1) | **Nolasco** (4–1) | | 32,128 | 17–16 | |
| 34 | May 13 | Mets | W 8–4 | **Bell** (2–3) | Francisco (1–3) | | 26,401 | 18–16 | |
| 35 | May 14 | Pirates | L 2–3 | Lincoln (3–0) | **Sánchez** (2–1) | Hanrahan (7) | 25,666 | 18–17 | |
| 36 | May 15 | Pirates | W 6–2 | **Johnson** (1–3) | Correia (1–4) | | 24,242 | 19–17 | |
| 37 | May 16 | @ Braves | W 8–4 | **Buehrle** (3–4) | Minor (2–3) | | 21,106 | 20–17 | |
| 38 | May 17 | @ Braves | L 0–7 | Beachy (5–1) | **Nolasco** (4–2) | | 27,724 | 20–18 | |
| 39 | May 18 | @ Indians | W 3–2 | **Zambrano** (2–2) | Sipp (0–2) | **Bell** (4) | 29,378 | 21–18 | |
| 40 | May 19 | @ Indians | L 0–2 | Gómez (3–2) | **Sánchez** (2–2) | Perez (13) | 29,799 | 21–19 | |
| 41 | May 20 | @ Indians | W 5–3 | **Johnson** (2–3) | Lowe (6–2) | **Bell** (5) | 23,668 | 22–19 | |
| 42 | May 21 | Rockies | W 7–4 | **Buehrle** (4–4) | Moyer (2–4) | **Bell** (6) | 25,155 | 23–19 | |
| 43 | May 22 | Rockies | W 7–6 | **Nolasco** (5–2) | Nicasio (2–2) | **Bell** (7) | 22,242 | 24–19 | |
| 44 | May 23 | Rockies | L 4–8 | White (1–3) | **Zambrano** (2–3) | | 23,985 | 24–20 | |
| 45 | May 24 | Giants | L 7–14 | Vogelsong (3–2) | **Sánchez** (2–3) | | 24,099 | 24–21 | |
| 46 | May 25 | Giants | W 7–6 | **Jennings** (1–0) | Lincecum (2–5) | **Cishek** (1) | 27,123 | 25–21 | |
| 47 | May 26 | Giants | W 5–3 | **Buehrle** (5–4) | Bumgarner (5–4) | **Choate** (1) | 30,663 | 26–21 | |
| 48 | May 27 | Giants | L 2–3 | Cain (5–2) | **Nolasco** (5–3) | Casilla (12) | 30,199 | 26–22 | |
| 49 | May 28 | Nationals | W 5–3 | **Zambrano** (3–3) | Zimmermann (3–5) | **Bell** (8) | 31,528 | 27–22 | |
| 50 | May 29 | Nationals | W 3–1 | **Sánchez** (3–3) | Jackson (1–3) | **Bell** (9) | 25,969 | 28–22 | |
| 51 | May 30 | Nationals | W 5–3 | **Johnson** (3–3) | Wang (1–1) | **Bell** (10) | 24,224 | 29–22 | |

June (8–18)

| # | Date | Opponent | Score | Win | Loss | Save | Attendance | Record | Box |
|---|---|---|---|---|---|---|---|---|---|
| 52 | June 1 | @ Phillies | L 4–6 | Kendrick (2–4) | **Buehrle** (5–5) | Papelbon (15) | 44,497 | 29–23 | |
| 53 | June 2 | @ Phillies | W 5–4 | **Nolasco** (6–3) | Hamels (8–2) | **Bell** (11) | 45,509 | 30–23 | |
| 54 | June 3 | @ Phillies | W 5–1 | **Zambrano** (4–3) | Blanton (4–6) | **Bell** (12) | 45,356 | 31–23 | |
| 55 | June 5 | Braves | L 0–11 | Hudson (4–2) | **Sánchez** (3–4) | | 25,432 | 31–24 | |
| 56 | June 6 | Braves | L 1–2 | Delgado (4–5) | **Johnson** (3–4) | Kimbrel (17) | 22,619 | 31–25 | |
| 57 | June 7 | Braves | L 2–8 | Minor (3–4) | **Buehrle** (5–6) | | 22,402 | 31–26 | |
| 58 | June 8 | Rays | L 1–5 | Badenhop (1–1) | **Nolasco** (6–4) | | 29,628 | 31–27 | |
| 59 | June 9 | Rays | L 4–13 | Moore (3–5) | **Zambrano** (4–4) | | 30,963 | 31–28 | |
| 60 | June 10 | Rays | L 2–4 | Shields (7–4) | **Sánchez** (3–5) | Rodney (18) | 31,111 | 31–29 | |
| 61 | June 11 | Red Sox | W 4–1 | **Johnson** (4–4) | Beckett (4–7) | **Bell** (13) | 32,562 | 32–29 | |
| 62 | June 12 | Red Sox | L 1–2 | Buchholz (7–2) | **Buehrle** (5–7) | Aceves (15) | 29,326 | 32–30 | |
| 63 | June 13 | Red Sox | L 2–10 | Doubront (7–3) | **Nolasco** (6–5) | | 33,119 | 32–31 | |
| 64 | June 15 | @ Rays | L 0–11 | Moore (4–5) | **Zambrano** (4–5) | | 18,369 | 32–32 | |
| 65 | June 16 | @ Rays | W 4–3 (15) | **Webb** (3–1) | Gomes (1–2) | **Bell** (14) | 22,332 | 33–32 | |
| 66 | June 17 | @ Rays | L 0–3 | Cobb (3–3) | **Johnson** (4–5) | Rodney (19) | 33,810 | 33–33 | |
| 67 | June 19 | @ Red Sox | L 5–7 | Buchholz (8–2) | **Buehrle** (5–8) | Aceves (17) | 37,701 | 33–34 | |
| 68 | June 20 | @ Red Sox | L 5–15 | Doubront (8–3) | **Nolasco** (6–6) | | 37,362 | 33–35 | |
| 69 | June 21 | @ Red Sox | L 5–6 | Atchison (2–0) | **Mujica** (0–3) | Aceves (18) | 37,261 | 33–36 | |
| 70 | June 22 | Blue Jays | L 5–12 | Romero (8–1) | **Sánchez** (3–6) | | 22,387 | 33–37 | |
| 71 | June 23 | Blue Jays | L 1–7 | Oliver (2–2) | **Cishek** (4–1) | | 24,448 | 33–38 | |
| 72 | June 24 | Blue Jays | W 9–0 | **Buehrle** (6–8) | Chavez (0–1) | | 27,888 | 34–38 | |
| 73 | June 25 | Cardinals | L 7–8 (10) | Marte (2–1) | **Gaudin** (2–1) | Motte (15) | 27,369 | 34–39 | |
| 74 | June 26 | Cardinals | L 2–5 | Lohse (7–2) | **Zambrano** (4–6) | Motte (16) | 25,444 | 34–40 | |
| 75 | June 27 | Cardinals | W 5–3 | **Sánchez** (4–6) | Freeman (0–1) | **Bell** (15) | 28,397 | 35–40 | |
| 76 | June 29 | Phillies | W 6–2 | **Johnson** (5–5) | Lee (0–5) | | 28,246 | 36–40 | |
| 77 | June 30 | Phillies | W 3–2 | **Buehrle** (7–8) | Hamels (10–4) | **Bell** (16) | 31,311 | 37–40 | |

July (10–16)

| # | Date | Opponent | Score | Win | Loss | Save | Attendance | Record | Box |
|---|---|---|---|---|---|---|---|---|---|
| 78 | July 1 | Phillies | W 5–2 | **Nolasco** (7–6) | Blanton (7–7) | **Bell** (17) | 31,727 | 38–40 | |
| 79 | July 2 | @ Brewers | L 5–6 | Rodríguez (1–4) | **Webb** (3–2) | Axford (14) | 28,674 | 38–41 | |
| 80 | July 3 | @ Brewers | L 12–13 (10) | Hernández (2–1) | **Bell** (2–4) | | 33,178 | 38–42 | |
| 81 | July 4 | @ Brewers | W 7–6 (10) | **LeBlanc** (1–0) | Parra (0–3) | **Bell** (18) | 31,910 | 39–42 | |
| 82 | July 5 | @ Brewers | W 4–0 | **Buehrle** (8–8) | Fiers (3–3) | | 27,443 | 40–42 | |
| 83 | July 6 | @ Cardinals | W 3–2 | **Nolasco** (8–6) | Westbrook (7–7) | **Bell** (19) | 46,721 | 41–42 | |
| 84 | July 7 | @ Cardinals | L 2–3 | Lohse (9–2) | **Zambrano** (4–7) | Motte (20) | 41,312 | 41–43 | |
| 85 | July 8 | @ Cardinals | L 4–5 | Boggs (2–1) | **Bell** (2–5) | | 38,436 | 41–44 | |
| – | July 10 | **2012 Major League Baseball All-Star Game in Kansas City, Missouri** | | | | | | | |
| 86 | July 13 | Nationals | L 1–5 | Zimmermann (6–6) | **Johnson** (5–6) | | 30,911 | 41–45 | |
| 87 | July 14 | Nationals | W 2–1 | **Buehrle** (9–8) | Gonzalez (12–4) | **Cishek** (2) | 28,707 | 42–45 | |
| 88 | July 15 | Nationals | L 0–4 | Strasburg (10–4) | **Nolasco** (8–7) | | 29,889 | 42–46 | |
| 89 | July 16 | Nationals | W 5–3 | **Zambrano** (5–7) | Jackson (5–5) | **Dunn** (1) | 29,248 | 43–46 | |
| 90 | July 17 | @ Cubs | W 9–5 | **Sánchez** (5–6) | Wood (4–4) | | 34,397 | 44–46 | |
| 91 | July 18 | @ Cubs | L 1–5 (8) | Russell (3–0) | **Johnson** (5–7) | | 34,934 | 44–47 | |
| 92 | July 19 | @ Cubs | L 2–4 | Maholm (8–6) | **Buehrle** (9–9) | Mármol (11) | 32,741 | 44–48 | |
| 93 | July 20 | @ Pirates | L 3–4 | Correia (7–6) | **Nolasco** (8–8) | Hanrahan (27) | 37,193 | 44–49 | |
| 94 | July 21 | @ Pirates | L 1–5 | Burnett (11–3) | **Zambrano** (5–8) | Lincoln (1) | 39,411 | 44–50 | |
| 95 | July 22 | @ Pirates | L 0–3 | Karstens (3–2) | **Sánchez** (5–7) | Hanrahan (28) | 34,203 | 44–51 | |
| 96 | July 23 | Braves | W 2–1 | **Johnson** (6–7) | Minor (5–7) | **Cishek** (3) | 29,019 | 45–51 | |
| 97 | July 24 | Braves | L 3–4 | Hudson (9–4) | **LeBlanc** (1–1) | Kimbrel (29) | 25,616 | 45–52 | |
| 98 | July 25 | Braves | L 1–7 | Hanson (11–5) | **Nolasco** (8–9) | | 36,711 | 45–53 | |
| 99 | July 27 | Padres | L 2–7 | Wells (2–3) | **Zambrano** (5–9) | | 23,161 | 45–54 | |
| 100 | July 28 | Padres | W 4–2 | **Eovaldi** (2–6) | Ohlendorf (3–1) | **Cishek** (4) | 26,401 | 46–54 | |
| 101 | July 29 | Padres | W 5–4 (10) | **Webb** (4–2) | Brach (0–2) | | 27,730 | 47–54 | |
| 102 | July 30 | @ Braves | L 2–8 | Hanson (12–5) | **Buehrle** (9–10) | | 22,624 | 47–55 | |
| 103 | July 31 | @ Braves | L 1–7 | Medlen (2–1) | **Nolasco** (8–10) | | 21,819 | 47–56 | |

August (12–17)

| # | Date | Opponent | Score | Win | Loss | Save | Attendance | Record | Box |
|---|---|---|---|---|---|---|---|---|---|
| 104 | August 1 | @ Braves | W 4–2 | **Zambrano** (6–9) | Sheets (3–1) | **Cishek** (5) | 18,133 | 48–56 | |
| 105 | August 2 | @ Braves | L 1–6 | Martínez (5–2) | **Eovaldi** (2–7) | | 19,685 | 48–57 | |
| 106 | August 3 (1) | @ Nationals | L 4–7 | Lannan (2–0) | **Hand** (0–1) | Clippard (22) | | 48–58 | |
| 107 | August 3 (2) | @ Nationals | W 5–2 | **Johnson** (7–7) | Gonzalez (13–6) | **Cishek** (6) | 32,334 | 49–58 | |
| 108 | August 4 | @ Nationals | L 7–10 | Mattheus (4–1) | **Dunn** (0–1) | | 33,449 | 49–59 | |
| 109 | August 5 | @ Nationals | L 1–4 | Strasburg (12–5) | **Nolasco** (8–11) | Storen (1) | 30,453 | 49–60 | |
| 110 | August 7 | @ Mets | W 4–2 | **Zambrano** (7–9) | Niese (8–6) | **Cishek** (7) | 28,968 | 50–60 | |
| 111 | August 8 | @ Mets | W 13–0 | **Eovaldi** (3–7) | Young (3–6) | | 26,193 | 51–60 | |
| 112 | August 9 | @ Mets | L 1–6 | Dickey (15–3) | **Johnson** (7–8) | | 28,985 | 51–61 | |
| 113 | August 10 | Dodgers | L 2–5 | Kershaw (10–6) | **Buehrle** (9–11) | Jansen (23) | 28,130 | 51–62 | |
| 114 | August 11 | Dodgers | W 7–3 | **Nolasco** (9–11) | Blanton (8–10) | | 27,681 | 52–62 | |
| 115 | August 12 | Dodgers | L 0–5 | Capuano (11–8) | **LeBlanc** (1–2) | | 28,388 | 52–63 | |
| 116 | August 13 | Phillies | L 0–4 | Hamels (13–6) | **Eovaldi** (3–8) | | 23,309 | 52–64 | |
| 117 | August 14 | Phillies | L 0–1 | Kendrick (5–9) | **Johnson** (7–9) | Papelbon (26) | 23,879 | 52–65 | |
| 118 | August 15 | Phillies | W 9–2 | **Buehrle** (10–11) | Halladay (6–7) | | 22,450 | 53–65 | |
| 119 | August 16 | @ Rockies | L 3–5 | Ottavino (4–1) | **Nolasco** (9–12) | Betancourt (22) | 24,807 | 53–66 | |
| 120 | August 17 | @ Rockies | W 6–5 | **LeBlanc** (2–2) | Roenicke (4–1) | **Cishek** (8) | 25,614 | 54–66 | |
| 121 | August 18 | @ Rockies | W 6–5 | **Eovaldi** (4–8) | Chatwood (3–3) | **Cishek** (9) | 30,426 | 55–66 | |
| 122 | August 19 | @ Rockies | L 2–3 | Ottavino (5–1) | **Johnson** (7–10) | Betancourt (23) | 43,961 | 55–67 | |
| 123 | August 20 | @ Diamondbacks | W 12–3 | **Buehrle** (11–11) | Saunders (6–10) | | 17,707 | 56–67 | |
| 124 | August 21 | @ Diamondbacks | W 6–5 (10) | **Gaudin** (2–1) | Demel (0–1) | **Cishek** (10) | 17,434 | 57–67 | |
| 125 | August 22 | @ Diamondbacks | L 2–3 | Skaggs (1–0) | **Turner** (1–2) | Putz (25) | 17,239 | 57–68 | |
| 126 | August 22 | @ Diamondbacks | L 0–3 | Miley (14–8) | **LeBlanc** (2–3) | Putz (26) | 20,027 | 57–69 | |
| 127 | August 24 | @ Dodgers | L 4–11 | Wright (5–3) | **Eovaldi** (4–9) | | 39,805 | 57–70 | |
| 128 | August 25 | @ Dodgers | L 2–8 | Kershaw (12–7) | **Johnson** (7–11) | | 40,284 | 57–71 | |
| 129 | August 26 | @ Dodgers | W 6–2 | **Buehrle** (12–11) | Harang (9–8) | **Cishek** (11) | 41,907 | 58–71 | |
| 130 | August 28 | Nationals | W 9–0 | **Nolasco** (10–12) | Strasburg (15–6) | | 24,877 | 59–71 | |
| 131 | August 29 | Nationals | L 4–8 | Detwiler (8–6) | **Turner** (1–3) | | 24,909 | 59–72 | |
| 132 | August 31 | Mets | L 0–3 | Dickey (17–4) | **Eovaldi** (4–10) | | 23,099 | 59–73 | |

September (8–19)

| # | Date | Opponent | Score | Win | Loss | Save | Attendance | Record | Box |
|---|---|---|---|---|---|---|---|---|---|
| 133 | September 1 | Mets | L 3–5 | Ramírez (3–3) | **Cishek** (4–2) | Francisco (23) | 26,402 | 59–74 | |
| 134 | September 2 | Mets | L 1–5 | Young (4–7) | **Buehrle** (12–12) | | 25,333 | 59–75 | |
| 135 | September 3 | Brewers | W 7–3 | **Nolasco** (11–12) | Fiers (8–7) | **Cishek** (12) | 22,391 | 60–75 | |
| 136 | September 4 | Brewers | L 4–8 | Loe (6–4) | **Dunn** (0–2) | Axford (24) | 23,403 | 60–76 | |
| 137 | September 5 | Brewers | L 5–8 | Peralta (1–0) | **Eovaldi** (4–11) | Axford (25) | 22,288 | 60–77 | |
| 138 | September 6 | Brewers | W 6–2 | **Johnson** (8–11) | Estrada (2–6) | | 18,707 | 61–77 | |
| 139 | September 7 | @ Nationals | W 9–7 (10) | **Gaudin** (3–1) | Clippard (2–4) | **Cishek** (13) | 28,533 | 62–77 | |
| 140 | September 8 | @ Nationals | L 6–7 (10) | Storen (2–1) | **Gaudin** (3–2) | | 28,860 | 62–78 | |
| 141 | September 9 | @ Nationals | W 8–0 | **Nolasco** (12–12) | Jackson (9–10) | | 24,396 | 63–78 | |
| 142 | September 10 | @ Phillies | L 1–3 | Kendrick (9–10) | **LeBlanc** (2–4) | Bastardo (1) | 41,505 | 63–79 | |
| 143 | September 11 | @ Phillies | L 7–9 | Halladay (10–7) | **Eovaldi** (4–12) | Papelbon (33) | 42,028 | 63–80 | |
| 144 | September 12 | @ Phillies | L 1–3 | Lee (5–7) | **Johnson** (8–12) | Papelbon (34) | 42,178 | 63–81 | |
| 145 | September 14 | Reds | W 4–0 | **Turner** (2–3) | Arroyo (12–8) | | 27,111 | 64–81 | |
| 146 | September 15 | Reds | W 6–4 | **Buehrle** (13–12) | Cueto (17–9) | **Cishek** (14) | 27,502 | 65–81 | |
| 147 | September 16 | Reds | L 4–5 (11) | Ondrusek (4–2) | **Zambrano** (7–10) | Broxton (25) | 24,983 | 65–82 | |
| 148 | September 17 | Braves | L 5–7 | Hudson (15–6) | **LeBlanc** (2–5) | Kimbrel (37) | 23,308 | 65–83 | |
| 149 | September 18 | Braves | W 4–3 (10) | **Bell** (3–5) | Gearrin (0–1) | | 23,009 | 66–83 | |
| 150 | September 19 | Braves | L 0–3 | Medlen (9–1) | **Johnson** (8–13) | Kimbrel (38) | 25,998 | 66–84 | |
| 151 | September 21 | @ Mets | L 3–7 | Niese (12–9) | **Turner** (2–4) | | 25,446 | 66–85 | |
| 152 | September 22 | @ Mets | L 3–4 | Dickey (19–6) | **Buehrle** (13–13) | Rauch (4) | 30,332 | 66–86 | |
| 153 | September 23 | @ Mets | L 2–3 | Parnell (5–4) | **Webb** (4–3) | | 26,923 | 66–87 | |
| 154 | September 25 | @ Braves | L 3–4 | Kimbrel (3–1) | **Dunn** (0–3) | | 25,632 | 66–88 | |
| 155 | September 26 | @ Braves | L 0–3 | Maholm (13–10) | **Johnson** (8–14) | Kimbrel (40) | 23,420 | 66–89 | |
| 156 | September 27 | @ Braves | L 2–6 | Hanson (13–9) | **Turner** (2–5) | | 27,270 | 66–90 | |
| 157 | September 28 | Phillies | W 2–1 | **Cishek** (5–2) | Lindblom (3–4) | | 28,201 | 67–90 | |
| 158 | September 29 | Phillies | L 5–9 | Halladay (11–8) | **Nolasco** (12–13) | | 30,202 | 67–91 | |
| 159 | September 30 | Phillies | L 1–4 | Hamels (17–6) | **Eovaldi** (4–13) | Papelbon (38) | 28,317 | 67–92 | |

October (2–1)

| # | Date | Opponent | Score | Win | Loss | Save | Attendance | Record | Box |
|---|---|---|---|---|---|---|---|---|---|
| 160 | October 1 | Mets | W 3–2 | **Bell** (4–5) | Ramírez (3–4) | **Cishek** (15) | 24,543 | 68–92 | |
| 161 | October 2 | Mets | W 4–3 (11) | **Gaudin** (4–2) | McHugh (0–4) | | 29,709 | 69–92 | |
| 162 | October 3 | Mets | L 2–4 | Hefner (4–7) | **Koehler** (0–1) | Parnell (7) | 27,418 | 69–93 | |

== Roster ==
2012 Miami Marlins
Roster
| Pitchers: 21 Heath Bell; 56 Mark Buehrle; 36 Randy Choate; 31 Steven Cishek; 40 Michael Dunn; 24 Nathan Eovaldi; 57 Chad Gaudin; 52 Brad Hand; 39 Chris Hatcher; 43 Dan Jennings; 55 Josh Johnson; 34 Tom Koehler; 23 Wade LeBlanc; 34 Edward Mujica; 47 Ricky Nolasco; 44 A. J. Ramos; 53 Sandy Rosario; 19 Aníbal Sánchez; 33 Jacob Turner; 58 Ryan Webb; 38 Carlos Zambrano | Catchers: 19 Rob Brantly; 14 John Buck; 9 Brett Hayes; Infielders: 29 Greg Dobbs; 3 Nick Green; 12 Omar Infante; 45 Carlos Lee; 22 Donnie Murphy; 2 Hanley Ramírez; 7 José Reyes; 15 Gaby Sánchez; 17 Donovan Solano; 41 Gil Velazquez | Outfielders: 1 Emilio Bonifacio; 8 Chris Coghlan; 6 Scott Cousins; 2 Gorkys Hernández; 26 Austin Kearns; 16 Kevin Mattison; 5 Logan Morrison; 11 Bryan Petersen; 20 Justin Ruggiano; 27 Giancarlo Stanton; Other batters: 10 Adam Greenberg | Manager: 13 Ozzie Guillén; Coaches: 28 Joey Cora (bench); 35 Reid Cornelius (bullpen); 4 Joey Espada (third base); 30 Eduardo Pérez (hitting); 51 Randy St. Claire (pitching); 25 Gary Thurman (first base); 75 Jeff Urgelles (bullpen catcher) |

== 2012 player stats ==
=== Batting ===
Note: G = Games played; AB = At bats; R = Runs scored; H = Hits; 2B = Doubles; 3B = Triples; HR = Home runs; RBI = Runs batted in; AVG = Batting average; SB = Stolen bases

| Player | G | AB | R | H | 2B | 3B | HR | RBI | AVG | SB |
|---|---|---|---|---|---|---|---|---|---|---|
| Emilio Bonifacio, CF, 2B | 64 | 244 | 30 | 63 | 3 | 4 | 1 | 11 | .258 | 30 |
| Rob Brantly, C | 31 | 100 | 14 | 29 | 8 | 0 | 3 | 8 | .290 | 1 |
| John Buck, C | 106 | 343 | 29 | 66 | 15 | 1 | 12 | 41 | .192 | 0 |
| Mark Buehrle, P | 31 | 67 | 2 | 3 | 1 | 0 | 0 | 1 | .045 | 0 |
| Steve Cishek, P | 68 | 1 | 0 | 0 | 0 | 0 | 0 | 0 | .000 | 0 |
| Chris Coghlan, OF | 39 | 93 | 10 | 13 | 1 | 0 | 1 | 10 | .140 | 0 |
| Scott Cousins, OF | 53 | 86 | 7 | 14 | 4 | 1 | 1 | 3 | .163 | 1 |
| Greg Dobbs, 3B, 1B | 120 | 319 | 26 | 91 | 13 | 2 | 5 | 39 | .285 | 4 |
| Michael Dunn, P | 60 | 1 | 0 | 0 | 0 | 0 | 0 | 0 | .000 | 0 |
| Nathan Eovaldi, P | 12 | 20 | 2 | 3 | 0 | 0 | 0 | 0 | .150 | 0 |
| Chad Gaudin, P | 46 | 8 | 0 | 0 | 0 | 0 | 0 | 0 | .000 | 0 |
| Nick Green, 3B, 2B, SS | 7 | 23 | 1 | 4 | 3 | 0 | 0 | 1 | .174 | 0 |
| Adam Greenberg, PH | 1 | 1 | 0 | 0 | 0 | 0 | 0 | 0 | .000 | 0 |
| Brad Hand, P | 1 | 1 | 0 | 0 | 0 | 0 | 0 | 0 | .000 | 0 |
| Chris Hatcher, P | 11 | 1 | 0 | 0 | 0 | 0 | 0 | 0 | .000 | 0 |
| Brett Hayes, C | 39 | 114 | 7 | 23 | 6 | 0 | 0 | 3 | .202 | 1 |
| Gorkys Hernández, OF | 45 | 132 | 16 | 28 | 2 | 3 | 3 | 11 | .212 | 5 |
| Omar Infante, 2B | 85 | 328 | 42 | 94 | 23 | 2 | 8 | 33 | .287 | 10 |
| Dan Jennings, P | 22 | 1 | 0 | 0 | 0 | 0 | 0 | 0 | .000 | 0 |
| Josh Johnson, P | 31 | 53 | 2 | 5 | 0 | 0 | 0 | 2 | .094 | 0 |
| Austin Kearns, OF | 87 | 147 | 21 | 36 | 6 | 0 | 4 | 16 | .245 | 2 |
| Tom Koehler, P | 8 | 1 | 0 | 0 | 0 | 0 | 0 | 0 | .000 | 0 |
| Wade LeBlanc, P | 25 | 12 | 0 | 1 | 1 | 0 | 0 | 0 | .083 | 0 |
| Carlos Lee, 1B | 81 | 292 | 29 | 71 | 12 | 0 | 4 | 48 | .243 | 3 |
| Kevin Mattison, OF | 3 | 5 | 0 | 0 | 0 | 0 | 0 | 0 | .000 | 0 |
| Logan Morrison, LF | 93 | 296 | 30 | 68 | 15 | 1 | 11 | 36 | .230 | 1 |
| Donnie Murphy, 3B, SS | 52 | 116 | 13 | 25 | 6 | 2 | 3 | 12 | .216 | 1 |
| Ricky Nolasco, P | 31 | 56 | 4 | 9 | 3 | 0 | 0 | 8 | .161 | 0 |
| Bryan Petersen, OF | 84 | 241 | 29 | 47 | 9 | 3 | 0 | 17 | .195 | 8 |
| Hanley Ramírez, 3B | 93 | 353 | 49 | 87 | 18 | 2 | 14 | 48 | .246 | 14 |
| José Reyes, SS | 160 | 642 | 86 | 184 | 37 | 12 | 11 | 57 | .287 | 40 |
| Justin Ruggiano, OF | 91 | 288 | 38 | 90 | 23 | 1 | 13 | 36 | .313 | 14 |
| Aníbal Sánchez, P | 19 | 30 | 1 | 3 | 0 | 1 | 0 | 0 | .100 | 0 |
| Gaby Sánchez, 1B | 55 | 183 | 12 | 37 | 10 | 0 | 3 | 17 | .202 | 1 |
| Donovan Solano, 2B | 93 | 285 | 29 | 84 | 11 | 3 | 2 | 28 | .295 | 7 |
| Giancarlo Stanton, RF | 123 | 449 | 75 | 130 | 30 | 1 | 37 | 86 | .290 | 6 |
| Jacob Turner, P | 7 | 14 | 0 | 0 | 0 | 0 | 0 | 0 | .000 | 0 |
| Gil Velazquez, 2B | 19 | 56 | 2 | 13 | 1 | 0 | 0 | 2 | .232 | 0 |
| Ryan Webb, P | 65 | 1 | 0 | 0 | 0 | 0 | 0 | 0 | .000 | 0 |
| Carlos Zambrano, P | 35 | 34 | 3 | 6 | 0 | 0 | 1 | 2 | .176 | 0 |
| Team totals | 162 | 5437 | 609 | 1327 | 261 | 39 | 137 | 576 | .244 | 149 |

=== Pitching ===
Note: W = Wins; L = Losses; ERA = Earned run average; G = Games pitched; GS = Games started; SV = Saves; IP = Innings pitched; H = Hits allowed; R = Runs allowed; ER = Earned runs allowed; BB = Walks allowed; K = Strikeouts

| Player | W | L | ERA | G | GS | SV | IP | H | R | ER | BB | K |
|---|---|---|---|---|---|---|---|---|---|---|---|---|
| Heath Bell | 4 | 5 | 5.09 | 73 | 0 | 19 | 63.2 | 70 | 38 | 36 | 32 | 59 |
| Mark Buehrle | 13 | 13 | 3.74 | 31 | 31 | 0 | 202.1 | 197 | 88 | 84 | 43 | 125 |
| Randy Choate | 0 | 0 | 2.49 | 44 | 0 | 1 | 25.1 | 16 | 11 | 7 | 9 | 27 |
| Steve Cishek | 5 | 2 | 2.69 | 68 | 0 | 15 | 63.2 | 54 | 26 | 19 | 35 | 68 |
| Michael Dunn | 0 | 3 | 4.91 | 60 | 0 | 1 | 44.0 | 49 | 31 | 24 | 37 | 47 |
| Nathan Eovaldi | 3 | 7 | 4.43 | 12 | 12 | 0 | 63.0 | 70 | 32 | 31 | 28 | 44 |
| Chad Gaudin | 4 | 2 | 4.54 | 46 | 0 | 0 | 69.1 | 72 | 39 | 35 | 31 | 57 |
| Brad Hand | 0 | 1 | 17.19 | 1 | 1 | 0 | 3.2 | 6 | 7 | 7 | 6 | 3 |
| Chris Hatcher | 0 | 0 | 4.30 | 11 | 0 | 0 | 14.2 | 17 | 9 | 7 | 6 | 10 |
| Dan Jennings | 1 | 0 | 1.89 | 22 | 0 | 0 | 19.0 | 18 | 5 | 4 | 12 | 8 |
| Josh Johnson | 8 | 14 | 3.81 | 31 | 31 | 0 | 191.1 | 180 | 84 | 81 | 72 | 165 |
| Tom Koehler | 0 | 1 | 5.40 | 8 | 1 | 0 | 13.1 | 15 | 8 | 8 | 3 | 13 |
| Wade LeBlanc | 2 | 5 | 3.67 | 25 | 9 | 0 | 68.2 | 71 | 30 | 28 | 20 | 43 |
| Edward Mujica | 0 | 3 | 4.38 | 41 | 0 | 2 | 39.0 | 36 | 21 | 19 | 9 | 26 |
| Ricky Nolasco | 12 | 13 | 4.48 | 31 | 31 | 0 | 191.0 | 214 | 100 | 95 | 56 | 125 |
| A. J. Ramos | 0 | 0 | 3.86 | 11 | 0 | 0 | 9.1 | 8 | 4 | 4 | 4 | 13 |
| Sandy Rosario | 0 | 0 | 18.00 | 4 | 0 | 0 | 3.0 | 8 | 6 | 6 | 0 | 2 |
| Aníbal Sánchez | 5 | 7 | 3.94 | 19 | 19 | 0 | 121.0 | 119 | 59 | 53 | 33 | 110 |
| Jacob Turner | 1 | 4 | 3.38 | 7 | 7 | 0 | 42.2 | 33 | 21 | 16 | 11 | 29 |
| Ryan Webb | 4 | 3 | 4.03 | 65 | 0 | 0 | 60.1 | 72 | 30 | 27 | 28 | 44 |
| Carlos Zambrano | 7 | 10 | 4.49 | 35 | 20 | 0 | 132.1 | 123 | 75 | 66 | 76 | 95 |
| Team totals | 69 | 93 | 4.09 | 162 | 162 | 38 | 1440.2 | 1448 | 724 | 655 | 495 | 1113 |

== Farm system ==
| Level | Team | League | Manager |
|---|---|---|---|
| AAA | New Orleans Zephyrs | Pacific Coast League | Ron Hassey |
| AA | Jacksonville Suns | Southern League | Andy Barkett |
| A | Jupiter Hammerheads | Florida State League | Andy Haines |
| A | Greensboro Grasshoppers | South Atlantic League | Dave Berg |
| A-Short Season | Jamestown Jammers | New York–Penn League | Ángel Espada |
| Rookie | GCL Marlins | Gulf Coast League | Jorge Hernández |
