= James McDonald (baseball) =

American baseball player (born 1984)

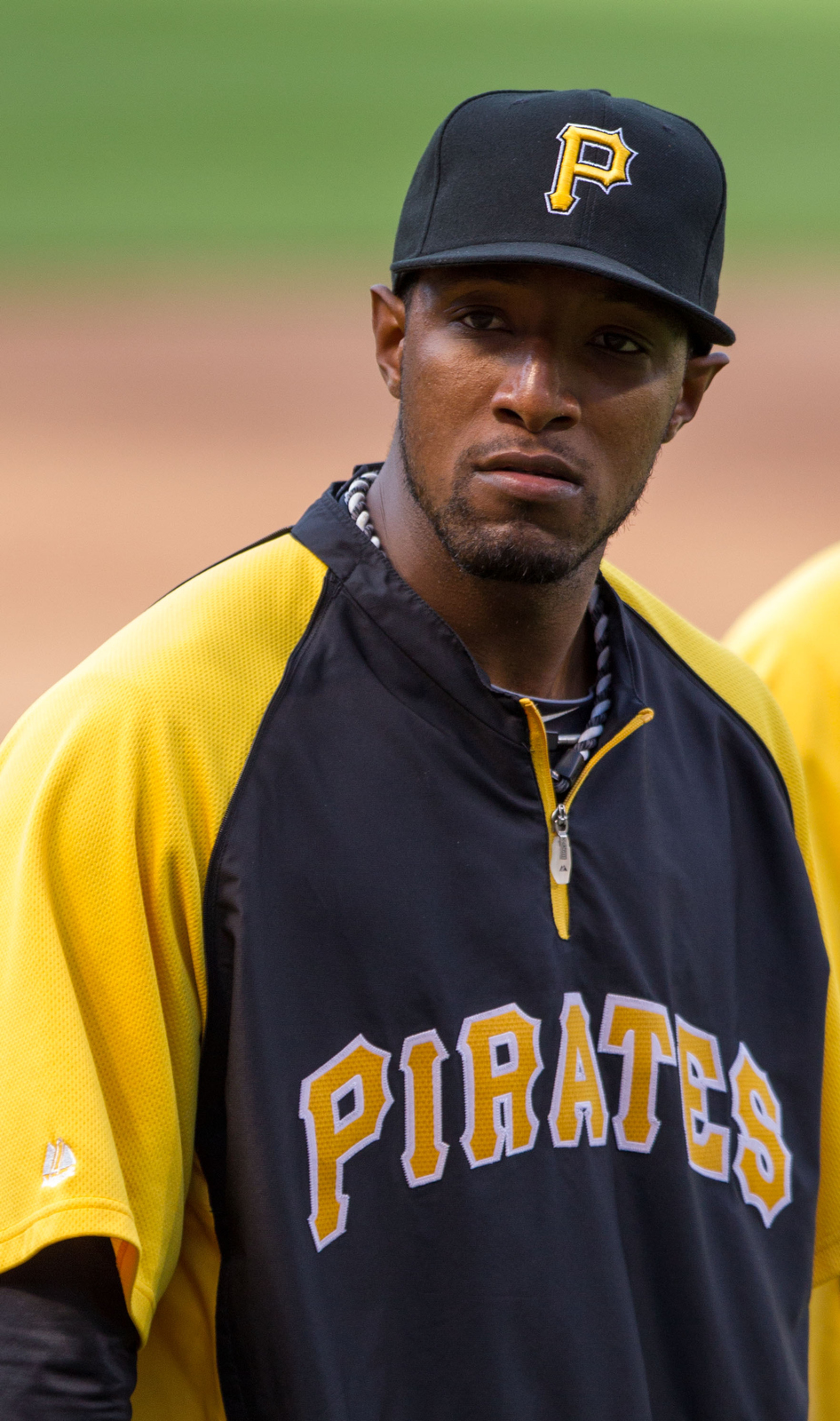
- McDonald with the Pittsburgh Pirates
- Pitcher
- Born: October 19, 1984 (age 41); Long Beach, California, U.S.
- Batted: Left Threw: Right

MLB debut
- September 17, 2008, for the Los Angeles Dodgers

Last MLB appearance
- May 1, 2013, for the Pittsburgh Pirates

MLB statistics
- Win–loss record: 32–30
- Earned run average: 4.20
- Strikeouts: 442
- Stats at Baseball Reference

Teams
- Los Angeles Dodgers (2008–2010); Pittsburgh Pirates (2010–2013)

James Zell McDonald (born October 19, 1984) is an American former professional baseball right-handed pitcher. He played in Major League Baseball (MLB) for the Los Angeles Dodgers and Pittsburgh Pirates.

McDonald was selected by the Los Angeles Dodgers in the 11th round of the June 2002 MLB draft, and as a draft and follow pick, he played at Golden West College in Huntington Beach, California.

== Early life ==
McDonald attended Long Beach Poly High School, where he played baseball, basketball and football. He played in the infield and pitched, however, he was selected by the Dodgers in 2002 more for his ability as a first baseman instead of a pitcher. But in junior college, McDonald's pitching improved so exponentially that he was signed by Los Angeles.

== Professional baseball career ==
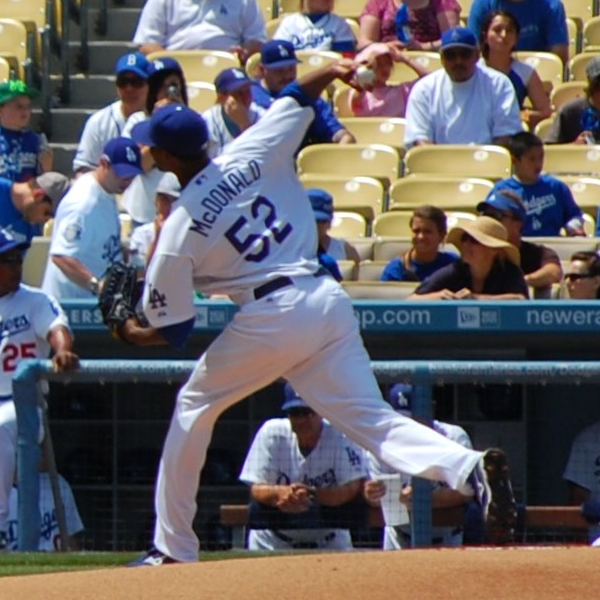
McDonald pitching for the LA Dodgers in 2009.

=== Los Angeles Dodgers ===
He made his professional debut pitching for the Gulf Coast Dodgers in 2003, where he compiled a modest 3.33 ERA with 47 strikeouts over 48.2 innings of work, although unfortunately a case of tendinitis prevented him from pitching in 2004 and most of the 2005. But instead of opting for a rehab program, McDonald and others were still interested in his hitting ability. He made the switch to outfield, thinking he could still work with trainers while keeping occupied in left field, but after sub-.230 batting averages in '04 with the Gulf Coast Dodgers and again in 2005 with the Ogden Raptors, he expressed his desire to return to pitching. "When I was in the outfield, I felt like I was just running around. I am a lot more competitive when I'm pitching, it's more up to me to get guys out." he explained to Bill Shelley. In 2006, he was back on the hill full-time for the South Atlantic League's Columbus Catfish where he led the pitching staff with an ERA of 3.97 and 147 strikeouts in 143 innings of work but only managed to finish with a record of 5–10. McDonald started 2007 with the Inland Empire 66ers before he was promoted to the Double-A Jacksonville Suns. He was named the Dodgers' Minor League Pitcher of the Year in 2007. In August 2008, he was promoted to the Dodgers Triple-A affiliate, Las Vegas 51s. He went 1–0 in his first two starts, striking out 20 batters in that span. He was called up to the Dodgers on September 1, 2008. He made his major league debut on September 17, 2008, against the Pittsburgh Pirates, working one scoreless inning in relief. In February 2009, McDonald was named the #56 prospect in baseball by Baseball America. McDonald then earned a spot in the Dodgers' starting rotation to begin the 2009 season and started his first game in the majors on April 10, 2009, at Chase Field against the Arizona Diamondbacks, allowing five runs in a little over two innings. He made three more starts, only lasting as many as five innings in one (April 25 against the Colorado Rockies, his first career victory), and then was demoted back to the bullpen. With an ERA of 6.75, he was optioned back to AAA on May 14, and then recalled by the Dodgers on June 19. After being recalled, he pitched exclusively out of the bullpen the rest of the season. McDonald began 2010 in the starting rotation for the Albuquerque Isotopes. He was recalled by the Dodgers to start the game on July 19 against the San Francisco Giants. He made a few additional appearances in the bullpen for the Dodgers.

=== Pittsburgh Pirates ===
On July 31, 2010, McDonald was traded along with outfielder Andrew Lambo to the Pittsburgh Pirates for reliever Octavio Dotel. In his Pirates debut, he pitched 6 innings of shutout ball against the Colorado Rockies and set a career-high with eight strikeouts in a 5–1 Pirates victory. "I was just real excited today and ready to be on the mound and to get a chance to start every five days," said McDonald. "I was having fun today. When you get ahead, pitching can be fun."

McDonald then pitched two consecutive shutouts, first on September 7, 2010 against the Atlanta Braves in a 5–0 Pirates victory and second on September 13 against the New York Mets. His streak of 20 straight scoreless innings, the longest by any Pirate pitcher since Zach Duke threw 22 straight scoreless innings in 2005, was ended against the Arizona Diamondbacks on September 18 although McDonald still earned the win to move to 4–1 at PNC Park. His performances prompted Jack Moore of Fangraphs to call McDonald an "ace" for the Pirates and the biggest steal of the 2010 MLB Trading Deadline.

He completed the 2010 with a 4–5 record with a 3.52 ERA and 61 strikeouts in Pittsburgh over a span of 11 starts.

==== 2011 ====
McDonald allowed 21 earned runs over his first four starts, but finished May with a 2.86 ERA while giving up no more than three runs in any start. On two consecutive starts on July 19 and 25, McDonald allowed 0 runs against the Cincinnati Reds and the Atlanta Braves. Following the Atlanta game where McDonald out-dueled Braves ace Tim Hudson and struck out nine while walking none, he spoke about his control during the first half of the season. "It's been an issue for me this year. I told myself in the second half I was going to keep my walks down. Being ahead is a big key for me." The win helped propel the Pirates into a first-place tie in the NL Central with St. Louis. McDonald finished the season 9–9 with a 4.21 ERA, 142 strikeouts and 78 walks over 171 innings of work.

==== 2012 ====
To begin the 2012 campaign, McDonald delivered several quality starts before earning his first victory of the season on April 30 against Atlanta, a 7 2/3-inning, 10 strikeout performance. On May 17, McDonald set a new career-high for strikeouts with 11 against the Washington Nationals, while also taking a no-hit bid into the sixth inning. During the month of May, he posted a record of 3–1 with a sparkling 1.54 ERA. On June 21, McDonald pitched his first career complete game, against the Minnesota Twins, throwing 120 pitches and allowing one earned run. McDonald had a 2.37 ERA before the all-star break but a 7.52 ERA after the all-star break.

==== 2013 ====
McDonald was designated for assignment by the Pirates on September 7. He became a free agent on September 13.

=== Chicago Cubs ===
On February 13, 2014, McDonald signed a minor league contract with the Chicago Cubs. He did not pitch in a game for the team due to injury and became a free agent after the season on October 29.

=== Coaching career ===
In 2017, McDonald became a coach for the Southwest Nationals Baseball Organization, founded by former MLB pitcher Scott Elbert.

== Pitching style ==
McDonald has a variety of pitches. His primary pitch is a four-seam fastball in the 91–94 mph range. He throws a two-seam fastball with similar velocity. He features two breaking balls: a slider (79–82) and a knuckle curve (75–77). His last pitch is a changeup in the low 80s. McDonald does not mix his repertoire differently between right-handed and left-handed hitters. He throws his four-seamer about half the time and uses his curveball most often when he is ahead in the count.

In the early part of the 2012 season, his slider was recognized as the NL's second-best swing-and-miss pitch, only behind Cole Hamels' changeup, with whiff rate of 49% since 2011.

== Personal ==
McDonald's father, also named James, played basketball at USC and football for the Los Angeles Rams from 1983–87, while his uncle Ben McDonald, was a professional basketball player for the Golden State Warriors. His cousins are former Chicago Cubs outfielder Darnell McDonald and former New York Yankee and Kansas City Royal outfielder Donzell McDonald.
