= Mark Rogers (baseball) =

American baseball player (born 1986)

- Pitcher
- Born: January 30, 1986 (age 40); Brunswick, Maine, U.S.
- Batted: Right Threw: Right

MLB debut
- September 10, 2010, for the Milwaukee Brewers

Last MLB appearance
- August 31, 2012, for the Milwaukee Brewers

MLB statistics
- Win–loss record: 3–1
- Earned run average: 3.49
- Strikeouts: 52
- Stats at Baseball Reference

Teams
- Milwaukee Brewers (2010, 2012)

Mark Elliot Rogers (born January 30, 1986) is an American former professional baseball pitcher. He played in Major League Baseball (MLB) for the Milwaukee Brewers in 2010 and 2012.

== Career ==
=== Milwaukee Brewers ===
Rogers was drafted by the Milwaukee Brewers as the 5th overall pick in the first round of the 2004 amateur entry draft out of Mt. Ararat High School in Topsham, Maine, where he was coached by Bob Neron, and his father Craig. In 2004, he played for the rookie-level Arizona League Brewers. Rogers was promoted to the Single-A West Virginia Power in 2005. Rogers split the 2006 season between the AZL Brewers and the High-A Brevard County Manatees.

In July 2006, Rogers injured his right shoulder and underwent surgery to repair a torn labrum. In June 2007, he had scar tissue removed as a result of the first surgery. After rehabbing for the entire 2008 season, Rogers returned to the field for Brevard County in 2009. Rogers played the majority of the 2010 season with the Double-A Huntsville Stars, but also played one game for the Triple-A Nashville Sounds. On September 10, he was recalled by the Brewers, making his major league debut in that evening's game.

On August 19, 2011, Major League Baseball announced that Rogers had been suspended for 25 games "due to a second positive test for a stimulant in violation of Major League Baseball's Joint Drug Prevention and Treatment Program".

On July 29, 2012, Rogers returned to the major leagues to replace Zack Greinke in the starting rotation after he was traded to the Los Angeles Angels of Anaheim. Rogers, during his call-up, went 3–1 with a 3.92 ERA, striking out 41 batters in 39 innings.

=== Seattle Mariners ===
Rogers signed a minor league contract with the Seattle Mariners on January 24, 2014. He was released on May 5, after two games for the Triple-A Tacoma Rainiers. Rogers later signed a minor league contract with the Texas Rangers organization, and was released on March 31, 2015.

== Personal life ==
After his playing career, Rogers returned to Maine and is a volunteer assistant coach for the Brunswick High School baseball team. His father, Craig, is the head coach.
