= 2012 New York Mets season =

2012 New York Mets
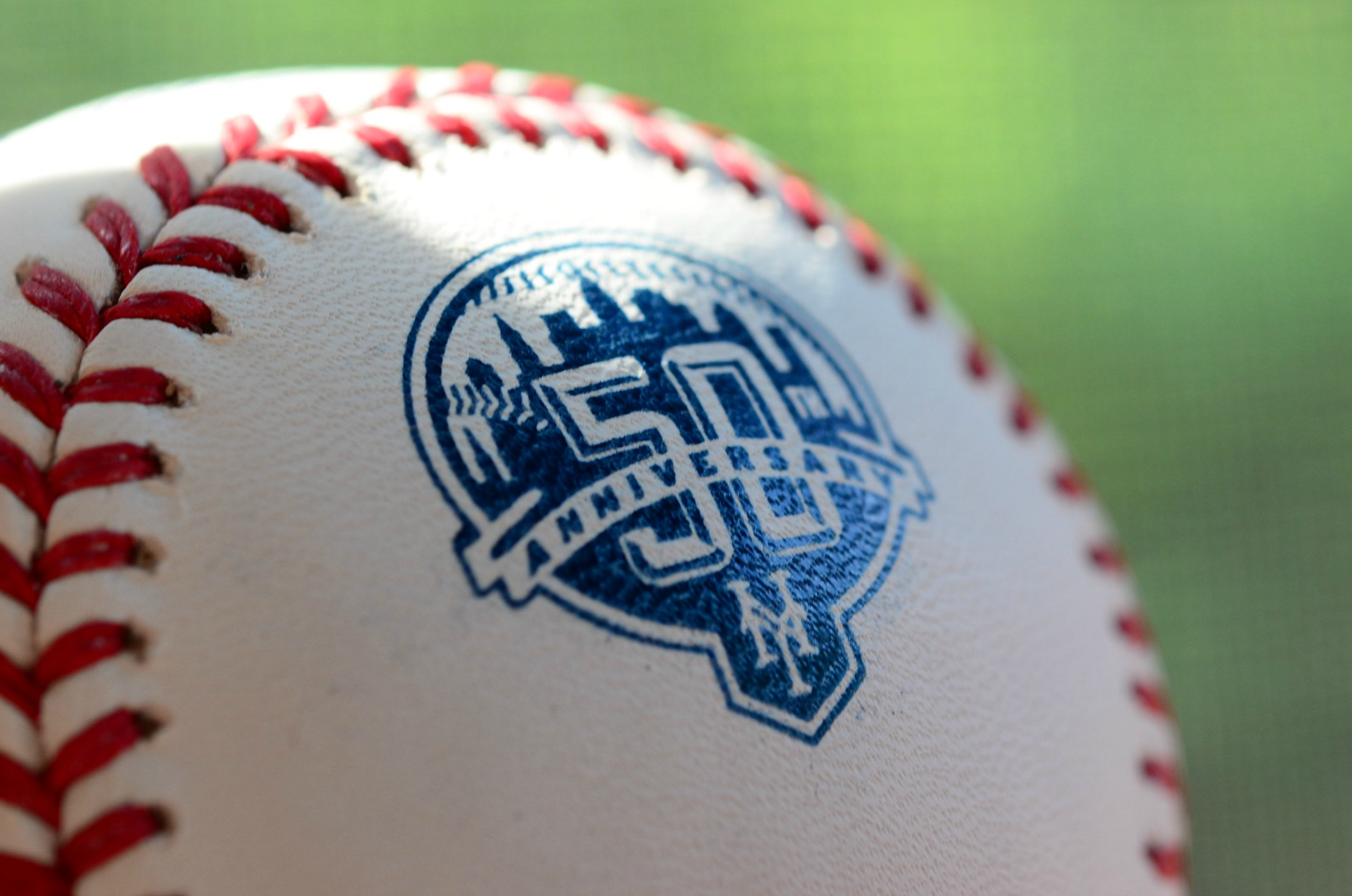
- The Mets celebrated their 50th anniversary in 2012.
- League: National League
- Division: East
- Ballpark: Citi Field
- City: New York, New York
- Record: 74–88 (.457)
- Divisional place: 4th
- Owners: Fred Wilpon
- General manager: Sandy Alderson
- Manager: Terry Collins
- Television: SportsNet New York; WPIX (CW affiliate) (Gary Cohen, Ron Darling, Keith Hernandez, Ralph Kiner)
- Radio: WFAN (English); New York Mets Radio Network (Howie Rose, Josh Lewin, Ed Coleman); WQBU-FM (Spanish) (Juan Alicea, Max Perez Jiminez)

The 2012 New York Mets season was the franchise's 51st season and its 4th in Citi Field. The team also celebrated its 50th anniversary since their inaugural season in 1962. Johan Santana pitched the first no-hitter in franchise history on June 1, 2012 against the St. Louis Cardinals. The Mets finished with a 74–88 record and 4th place in the National League East, missing the postseason for the sixth straight season.

== Offseason ==
Shortly after the 2011 season ended, the Mets made changes to their coaching staff, keeping only pitching coach Dan Warthen and hitting coach Dave Hudgens. Third base coach Chip Hale went to the Oakland Athletics to join manager Bob Melvin. General Manager Sandy Alderson said that the "changes were necessary for us to move forward." Former A's manager Bob Geren was named to replace Hale.

The additions were intended to improve the depth of the bullpen, which was sub-par in the 2011 season. They added reliever Ramon Ramírez and center fielder Andrés Torres, in exchange for the starting center fielder Ángel Pagán. They also signed Frank Francisco to be their closer, and added Jon Rauch, who was the tallest current player in the major leagues, to be the set-up man for Francisco.

For 2012, the Mets made several construction changes to Citi Field's dimensions. In center field a new 8-foot wall was built in front of the 16-foot wall, coined by fans as "The Great Wall of Flushing." In right field, a new wall in front of the existing Mo's Zone was also built.

The Mets overhauled their uniforms for 2012. The cream colored pinstriped uniform became the primary home uniform, while the snow white uniforms served as the alternate home uniform. The black drop-shadows were removed from the pinstriped, snow white and road gray jerseys and the black two toned cap was retired. The black jersey and all black cap was worn on a limited basis on the road and was retired at the end of the season. The Mets wore two patches, one commemorating the team's 50th anniversary and another honoring Gary Carter, who died of a brain tumor on February 16, 2012.

== Regular season ==
The Mets began their 2012 season with a surprising three-game sweep of the Atlanta Braves. The Mets outscored the Braves 12–6 in the series. During that series, Frank Francisco became the third player in MLB history to record a save in every game of a season-opening series of at least three games, following Derrick Turnbow of the Milwaukee Brewers in 2006 and Salomón Torres of the Pittsburgh Pirates in 2007.

On June 1, Johan Santana made club history by becoming the first Mets pitcher to throw a no-hitter, in an 8–0 victory over the St. Louis Cardinals. This was also the first no-hitter to be pitched against a defending World Series champion since a former Met, Nolan Ryan, did it against the Oakland Athletics in their 1990 season while with the Texas Rangers.

On June 27 against the Chicago Cubs, the Mets became the first MLB team to hit a home run cycle. Daniel Murphy began with a two-run home run, his run in 352 at-bats, then in the top of the 5th, Ike Davis hit a three-run homer followed by Murphy's solo shot off of Casey Coleman, who had replaced starting pitcher Jeff Samardzija. In the 6th inning, Scott Hairston, who was typically a utility outfielder throughout the first half of the season, hit the cycle-ending grand slam off of Coleman. The Mets won the game, 17–1.

R. A. Dickey won the 2012 NL Cy Young Award, becoming the first knuckleball pitcher in MLB history to do so.

=== Season standings ===
==== NL East standings ====
NL East
Team	W	L	Pct.	GB	Home	Road
Washington Nationals	98	64	.605	—	50‍–‍31	48‍–‍33
Atlanta Braves	94	68	.580	4	48‍–‍33	46‍–‍35
Philadelphia Phillies	81	81	.500	17	40‍–‍41	41‍–‍40
New York Mets	74	88	.457	24	36‍–‍45	38‍–‍43
Miami Marlins	69	93	.426	29	38‍–‍43	31‍–‍50

==== NL Wild Card ====
Division leaders
Team	W	L	Pct.
Washington Nationals	98	64	.605
Cincinnati Reds	97	65	.599
San Francisco Giants	94	68	.580

Wild Card teams (Top 2 teams qualify for postseason)
Team	W	L	Pct.	GB
Atlanta Braves	94	68	.580	+6
St. Louis Cardinals	88	74	.543	—
Los Angeles Dodgers	86	76	.531	2
Milwaukee Brewers	83	79	.512	5
Philadelphia Phillies	81	81	.500	7
Arizona Diamondbacks	81	81	.500	7
Pittsburgh Pirates	79	83	.488	9
San Diego Padres	76	86	.469	12
New York Mets	74	88	.457	14
Miami Marlins	69	93	.426	19
Colorado Rockies	64	98	.395	24
Chicago Cubs	61	101	.377	27
Houston Astros	55	107	.340	33

=== Record vs. opponents ===
2012 National League record Source: MLB Standings Grid – 2012
Team	AZ	ATL	CHC	CIN	COL	MIA	HOU	LAD	MIL	NYM	PHI	PIT	SD	SF	STL	WSH	AL
Arizona	–	2–5	5–4	2–5	9–7	5–3	6–0	12–6	3–3	3–4	2–4	3–4	7–11	9–9	1–5	2–4	9–6
Atlanta	5–2	–	3–4	1–5	6–1	14–4	4–2	3–3	3–3	12–6	12–6	3–4	4–3	3–4	5–1	8–10	8–10
Chicago	4–5	4–3	–	4–12	2–4	8–5	2–4	2–4	4–13	4–2	2–4	8–8	3–3	1–6	7–10	1–6	5–10
Cincinnati	5–2	5–1	12–4	–	5–1	10–5	2–4	3–3	9–6	6–2	3–4	11–7	6–2	4–3	6–7	2–5	7–8
Colorado	7–9	1–6	4–2	1–5	–	5–2	5–2	8–10	5–1	5–2	2–7	2–4	8–10	4–14	2–5	4–3	2–13
Houston	0–6	2–4	5–8	5–10	2–5	–	2–4	2–4	8–9	4–2	3–3	5–12	3–5	1–8	4–11	1–7	6–9
Los Angeles	6–12	3–3	4–2	4–2	10–8	4–2	–	4–2	1–6	4–3	5–2	6–1	11–7	8-10	6–5	4–2	6–9
Miami	3–5	4–14	4–2	3–3	4–3	–	4-2	2-4	4–4	4–12	8–10	1–4	5–1	5–2	2–5	9–9	5–13
Milwaukee	3–3	3–3	13–4	6–9	1–5	9–8	6–1	4–4	–	3–2	2–5	11–4	3–4	2–4	6–9	3–5	6–9
New York	4–3	6–12	2–4	2–6	2–5	2–4	3–4	12–4	2–3	–	10–8	5–2	4–3	4–4	4–3	4–14	8–7
Philadelphia	4–2	6–12	4–2	4–3	7–2	3–3	2–5	10–8	5–2	8–10	–	3–4	4–3	2–4	5–2	9-9	5–10
Pittsburgh	4–3	2–3	8–8	7–11	4–2	4–1	12–5	1–6	4–11	2–5	4–3	–	1–5	3–3	8–7	3–2	10–8
San Diego	11–7	3–4	3–3	2–6	10–8	5–3	7–11	1–5	4–3	3–4	3–4	5–1	–	6–12	3–3	2–3	8–7
San Francisco	9–9	4–3	6–1	3–4	14–4	2–5	8–1	10–8	4–2	4–4	4–2	3–3	12–6	–	3–3	1–5	7–8
St. Louis	5–1	1–5	10–7	7–6	5–2	11–4	5–6	5–2	9–6	3–4	3–4	7–8	3–3	3–3	–	3–4	8–7
Washington	4–2	10–8	6–1	5–2	3–4	7–1	2–4	9–9	5–3	14–4	9-9	2–3	3–2	5-1	4-3	–	10–8

=== Game log ===
Legend
	Mets win
	Mets loss
	Postponement
**Bold**	Mets team member

2012 Game Log
April (13–10)

#	Date	Opponent	Score	Win	Loss	Save	Attendance	Record	Box/Streak
1	April 5	Braves	1–0	**Ramírez** (1–0)	Hanson (0–1)	**Francisco** (1)	42,080	1–0	W1
2	April 7	Braves	4–2	**Dickey** (1–0)	Jurrjens (0–1)	**Francisco** (2)	39,526	2–0	W2
3	April 8	Braves	7–5	**Niese** (1–0)	Minor (0–1)	**Francisco** (3)	27,855	3–0	W3
4	April 9	Nationals	4–3	**Rauch** (1–0)	Rodríguez (0–1)		23,970	4–0	W4
5	April 10	Nationals	2–6	Detwiler (1–0)	**Gee** (0–1)		26,927	4–1	L1
6	April 11	Nationals	0–4	Strasburg (1–0)	**Santana** (0–1)		34,614	4–2	L2
7	April 13	@ Phillies	5–2	**Dickey** (2–0)	Lee (0–1)		45,429	5–2	W1
8	April 14	@ Phillies	5–0	**Niese** (2–0)	Worley (0–1)		45,750	6–2	W2
9	April 15	@ Phillies	2–8	Hamels (1–1)	**Ramírez** (1–1)		45,829	6–3	L1
10	April 16	@ Braves	6–1	**Gee** (1–1)	Hanson (1–2)		16,161	7–3	W1
11	April 17	@ Braves	3–9	Delgado (2–0)	**Santana** (0–2)		18,732	7–4	L1
12	April 18	@ Braves	6–14	Martínez (1–0)	**Dickey** (2–1)		17,909	7–5	L2
13	April 20	Giants	3–4 (10)	Romo (1–0)	**Francisco** (0–1)	Hensley (1)	30,544	7–6	L3
14	April 21	Giants	5–4	**Rauch** (2–0)	Hensley (1–1)		33,844	8–6	W1
–	April 22	Giants	Game Postponed (rain) (to be made up as a doubleheader on 4/23)						
15	April 23	Giants	1–6	Lincecum (1–2)	**Batista** (0–1)			8–7	L1
16	April 23	Giants	2–7	Bumgarner (3–1)	**Gee** (1–2)		23,866	8–8	L2
17	April 24	Marlins	2–1	**Rauch** (3–0)	Mujica (0–2)	**Francisco** (4)	20,192	9–8	W1
18	April 25	Marlins	5–1	**Dickey** (3–1)	Buehrle (1–3)		20,623	10–8	W2
19	April 26	Marlins	3–2	**Ramírez** (2–1)	Bell (0–3)		20,660	11–8	W3
20	April 27	@ Rockies	9–18	Reynolds (3–0)	**Acosta** (0–1)		35,103	11–9	L1
21	April 28	@ Rockies	7–5	**Gee** (2–2)	Moscoso (0–1)	**Francisco** (5)	38,798	12–9	W1
22	April 29	@ Rockies	6–5 (11)	**Francisco** (1–1)	Belisle (1–2)	**Ramírez** (1)	36,690	13–9	W2
23	April 30	@ Astros	3–4	Rodriguez (1–3)	**Acosta** (0–2)	Myers (5)	17,536	13–10	L1

May (15–13)

#	Date	Opponent	Score	Win	Loss	Save	Attendance	Record	Report
24	May 1	@ Astros	3–6	Happ (2–1)	**Niese** (2–1)	Myers (6)	17,958	13–11	L2
25	May 2	@ Astros	1–8	Rodríguez (3–2)	**Schwinden** (0–1)		19,442	13–12	L3
26	May 4	Diamondbacks	4–5	Ziegler (1–1)	**Rauch** (3–1)	Putz (6)	26,995	13–13	L4
27	May 5	Diamondbacks	4–3	**Santana** (1–2)	Corbin (1–1)	**Francisco** (6)	30,253	14–13	W1
28	May 6	Diamondbacks	3–1	**Dickey** (4–1)	Cahill (2–3)	**Francisco** (7)	29,107	15–13	W2
29	May 7	@ Phillies	5–2	**Byrdak** (1–0)	Papelbon (0–1)	**Francisco** (8)	44,365	16–13	W3
30	May 8	@ Phillies	7–4	**Acosta** (1–2)	Qualls (1–1)	Rauch (1)	43,821	17–13	W4
31	May 9	@ Phillies	10–6	**Byrdak** (2–0)	Kendrick (0–3)		43,840	18–13	W5
32	May 11	@ Marlins	5–6	Bell (1–3)	**Francisco** (1–2)		31,007	18–14	L1
33	May 12	@ Marlins	9–3	**Dickey** (5–1)	Nolasco (4–1)		32,128	19–14	W1
34	May 13	@ Marlins	4–8	Bell (2–3)	**Francisco** (1–3)		26,401	19–15	L1
35	May 14	Brewers	3–1	**Batista** (1–1)	Gallardo (2–4)	**Francisco** (9)	20,061	20–15	W1
36	May 15	Brewers	0–8	Greinke (4–1)	**Gee** (2–3)		22,268	20–16	L1
37	May 16	Reds	3–6	Arredondo (3–1)	**Rauch** (3–2)	Marshall (7)	22,659	20–17	L2
38	May 17	Reds	9–4	**Parnell** (1–0)	Ondrusek (3–1)		29,943	21–17	W1
39	May 18	@ Blue Jays	5–14	Romero (5–1)	**Niese** (2–2)		26,712	21–18	L1
40	May 19	@ Blue Jays	0–2	Morrow (5–2)	**Hefner** (0–1)		34,962	21–19	L2
41	May 20	@ Blue Jays	6–5	**Gee** (3–3)	Álvarez (3–4)	**Francisco** (10)	41,867	22–19	W1
42	May 21	@ Pirates	4–5	Hughes (1–0)	**Rauch** (3–3)	Hanrahan (10)	14,556	22–20	L1
43	May 22	@ Pirates	3–2	**Dickey** (6–1)	Cruz (1–1)	**Francisco** (11)	15,794	23–20	W1
44	May 23	@ Pirates	3–1	**Niese** (3–2)	Morton (2–5)	**Francisco** (12)	25,731	24–20	W2
45	May 24	Padres	5–11	Stults (1–0)	**Hefner** (0–2)		24,109	24–21	L1
46	May 25	Padres	6–1	**Gee** (4–3)	Bass (2–5)		24,498	25–21	W1
47	May 26	Padres	9–0	**Santana** (2–2)	Richard (2–6)		28,745	26–21	W2
48	May 27	Padres	2–0	**Dickey** (7–1)	Vólquez (2–5)	**Francisco** (13)	28,361	27–21	W3
49	May 28	Phillies	4–8	Hamels (8–1)	**Parnell** (1–1)		32,122	27–22	L1
50	May 29	Phillies	6–3	**Hefner** (1–2)	Blanton (4–5)	**Francisco** (14)	25,487	28–22	W1
51	May 30	Phillies	6–10	Bastardo (2–1)	**Rauch** (3–4)		30,064	28–23	L1

June (15–13)

#	Date	Opponent	Score	Win	Loss	Save	Attendance	Record	Report
52	June 1	Cardinals	8–0	**Santana** (3–2)	Wainwright (4–6)		27,069	29–23	W1
53	June 2	Cardinals	5–0	**Dickey** (8–1)	Lynn (8–2)		27,914	30–23	W2
54	June 3	Cardinals	6–1	**Niese** (4–2)	Westbrook (4–5)		23,559	31–23	W3
55	June 4	Cardinals	4–5	Rzepczynski (1–3)	**Rauch** (3–5)	Motte (9)	25,830	31–24	L1
56	June 5	@ Nationals	6–7 (12)	Detwiler (4–3)	**Ramírez** (0–1)		26,256	31–25	L2
57	June 6	@ Nationals	3–5	Jackson (2–3)	**Hefner** (1–3)	Clippard (5)	27,335	31–26	L3
58	June 7	@ Nationals	3–1	**Dickey** (9–1)	Wang (1–2)	**Francisco** (15)	32,096	32–26	W1
59	June 8	@ Yankees	1–9	Kuroda (5–6)	**Santana** (3–3)		48,566	32–27	L1
60	June 9	@ Yankees	2–4	Hughes (6–5)	**Gee** (4–4)	Soriano (9)	48,575	32–28	L2
61	June 10	@ Yankees	4–5	Logan (1–0)	**Rauch** (3–6)		49,010	32–29	L3
62	June 12	@ Rays	11–2	**Young** (1–0)	Cobb (2–3)		17,334	33–29	W1
63	June 13	@ Rays	9–1	**Dickey** (10–1)	Price (8–4)		18,496	34–29	W2
64	June 14	@ Rays	9–6	**Santana** (4–3)	Hellickson (4–3)	**Francisco** (16)	21,947	35–29	W3
65	June 15	Reds	3–7	Arroyo (3–4)	**Gee** (4–5)		34,716	35–30	L1
66	June 16	Reds	1–4	Bailey (5–4)	**Niese** (4–3)	Chapman (8)	27,988	35–31	L2
67	June 17	Reds	1–3	Cueto (8–3)	**Young** (1–1)	Marshall (9)	40,134	35–32	L3
68	June 18	Orioles	5–0	**Dickey** (11–1)	Arrieta (3–9)		29,014	36–32	W1
69	June 19	Orioles	5–0	**Santana** (5–3)	Hunter (3–4)		32,587	37–32	W2
70	June 20	Orioles	4–3	**Gee** (5–5)	Matusz (5–8)	**Francisco** (17)	29,855	38–32	W3
71	June 22	Yankees	6–4	**Niese** (5–3)	Pettitte (3–3)	**Francisco** (18)	40,191	39–32	W4
72	June 23	Yankees	3–4	Rapada (2–0)	**Rauch** (3–7)	Soriano (14)	42,122	39–33	L1
73	June 24	Yankees	5–6	Logan (2–0)	**Batista** (1–2)	Soriano (15)	42,364	39–34	L2
74	June 25	@ Cubs	1–6	Wood (2–3)	**Santana** (5–4)		34,092	39–35	L3
75	June 26	@ Cubs	3–5	Maine (1–1)	**Gee** (5–6)	Mármol (5)	34,064	39–36	L4
76	June 27	@ Cubs	17–1	**Niese** (6–3)	Samardzija (5–7)		35,837	40–36	W1
77	June 28	@ Dodgers	3–2	**Young** (2–1)	Capuano (9–3)	**Parnell** (1)	49,006	41–36	W2
78	June 29	@ Dodgers	9–0	**Dickey** (12–1)	Harang (5–5)		49,763	42–36	W3
79	June 30	@ Dodgers	5–0	**Santana** (6–4)	Eovaldi (0–5)		44,217	43–36	W4

July (7–18)

#	Date	Opponent	Score	Win	Loss	Save	Attendance	Record	Report
80	July 1	@ Dodgers	3–8	Kershaw (6–4)	**Gee** (5–7)		55,359	43–37	L1
81	July 3	Phillies	11–1	**Niese** (7–3)	Worley (4–5)		42,516	44–37	W1
82	July 4	Phillies	2–9	Lee (1–5)	**Young** (2–2)		28,687	44–38	L1
83	July 5	Phillies	6–5	**Parnell** (2–1)	Papelbon (2–3)		28,409	45–38	W1
84	July 6	Cubs	7–8	Wood (4–3)	**Santana** (6–5)		27,956	45–39	L1
85	July 7	Cubs	3–1	**Gee** (6–7)	Samardzija (6–8)	**Parnell** (2)	26,096	46–39	W1
86	July 8	Cubs	0–7	Dempster (4–3)	**Niese** (7–4)		25,920	46–40	L1
–	July 10	**2012 Major League Baseball All-Star Game in Kansas City, Missouri**							
87	July 13	@ Braves	5–7	Martínez (4–1)	**Young** (2–3)	Kimbrel (26)	37,020	46–41	L2
88	July 14	@ Braves	7–8	Varvaro (1–0)	**Parnell** (2–2)	Kimbrel (27)	32,565	46–42	L3
89	July 15	@ Braves	1–6	Sheets (1–0)	**Santana** (6–6)		23,382	46–43	L4
90	July 17	@ Nationals	4–5 (10)	Mattheus (3–1)	**Byrdak** (2–1)		26,342	46–44	L5
91	July 18	@ Nationals	3–4	Zimmermann (7–6)	**Young** (2–4)	Clippard (15)	31,660	46–45	L6
92	July 19	@ Nationals	9–5	**Dickey** (13–1)	Gonzalez (12–5)		36,389	47–45	W1
93	July 20	Dodgers	6–7	Harang (7–5)	**Santana** (6–7)	Jansen (17)	30,806	47–46	L1
94	July 21	Dodgers	5–8	Capuano (10–5)	**Batista** (1–3)	Jansen (18)	33,503	47–47	L2
95	July 22	Dodgers	3–8 (12)	Wall (1–0)	**Ramírez** (2–2)		31,184	47–48	L3
96	July 23	Nationals	2–8 (10)	Gorzelanny (3–2)	**Byrdak** (2–2)		26,735	47–49	L4
97	July 24	Nationals	2–5	Gonzalez (13–5)	**Dickey** (13–2)	Clippard (17)	36,236	47–50	L5
98	July 25	Nationals	2–5	Strasburg (11–4)	**Hefner** (1–4)	Clippard (18)	35,517	47–51	L6
99	July 26	@ Diamondbacks	3–1	**Harvey** (1–0)	Miley (11–6)	**Parnell** (3)	22,010	48–51	W1
100	July 27	@ Diamondbacks	5–11	Collmenter (3–2)	**Niese** (7–5)		23,150	48–52	L1
101	July 28	@ Diamondbacks	3–6	Kennedy (9–8)	**Young** (2–5)	Putz (19)	33,759	48–53	L2
102	July 29	@ Diamondbacks	5–1	**Dickey** (14–2)	Saunders (5–7)		32,134	49–53	W1
103	July 30	@ Giants	8–7 (10)	**Edgin** (1–0)	Casilla (4–5)	**Acosta** (1)	41,300	50–53	W2
104	July 31	@ Giants	1–4	Lincecum (5–11)	**Harvey** (1–1)	Affeldt (2)	41,774	50–54	L1

August (12–16)

#	Date	Opponent	Score	Win	Loss	Save	Attendance	Record	Report
105	August 1	@ Giants	2–1	**Niese** (8–5)	Cain (10–4)	**Parnell** (4)	42,188	51–54	W1
106	August 2	@ Giants	9–1	**Young** (3–5)	Zito (8–8)		41,843	52–54	W2
107	August 3	@ Padres	1–3	Richard (8–11)	**Dickey** (14–3)	Street (18)	34,573	52–55	L1
108	August 4	@ Padres	6–2	**Hefner** (2–4)	Vólquez (7–8)	**Francisco** (19)	36,826	53–55	W1
109	August 5	@ Padres	3–7	Marquis (7–10)	**Harvey** (1–2)		24,635	53–56	L1
110	August 7	Marlins	2–4	Zambrano (7–9)	**Niese** (8–6)	Cishek (7)	28,968	53–57	L2
111	August 8	Marlins	0–13	Eovaldi (3–7)	**Young** (3–6)		26,193	53–58	L3
112	August 9	Marlins	6–1	**Dickey** (15–3)	Johnson (7–8)		28,985	54–58	W1
113	August 10	Braves	0–4	Maholm (10–7)	**Harvey** (1–3)		25,101	54–59	L1
114	August 11	Braves	3–9	Medlen (3–1)	**Santana** (6–8)		30,388	54–60	L2
115	August 12	Braves	6–5	**Niese** (9–6)	Sheets (4–2)	**Rauch** (2)	24,891	55–60	W1
116	August 14	@ Reds	0–3	Arredondo (5–2)	**Acosta** (1–3)		26,113	55–61	L1
117	August 15	@ Reds	1–6	Leake (5–7)	**Dickey** (15–4)		26,082	55–62	L2
118	August 16	@ Reds	8–4	**Harvey** (2–3)	Bailey (10–8)	**Rauch** (3)	23,137	56–62	W1
119	August 17	@ Nationals	4–6	Detwiler (7–5)	**Santana** (6–9)	Clippard (26)	34,827	56–63	L1
120	August 18	@ Nationals	2–0	**Niese** (10–6)	Jackson (7–8)	**Francisco** (20)	42,662	57–63	W1
121	August 19	@ Nationals	2–5	Gonzalez (16–6)	**Hefner** (2–5)	Clippard (27)	33,764	57–64	L1
122	August 20	Rockies	1–3	Brothers (7–2)	**Edgin** (1–1)	Betancourt (24)	23,833	57–65	L2
123	August 21	Rockies	2–6	Chacín (1–3)	**Young** (3–7)		27,633	57–66	L3
124	August 22	Rockies	2–5	Torres (2–1)	**Ramírez** (2–3)	Betancourt (25)	22,204	57–67	L4
125	August 23	Rockies	0–1	Brothers (8–2)	**Parnell** (2–3)	Belisle (1)	22,544	57–68	L5
126	August 24	Astros	1–3	Lyles (3–10)	**Niese** (10–7)	López (2)	25,513	57–69	L6
127	August 25	Astros	3–1	**Dickey** (16–4)	Abad (0–1)	**Francisco** (21)	29,906	58–69	W1
128	August 26	Astros	2–1	**Parnell** (3–3)	López (5–2)		25,071	59–69	W2
129	August 28	@ Phillies	9–5 (10)	**Parnell** (4–3)	Rosenberg (0–2)		41,227	60–69	W3
130	August 29	@ Phillies	3–2	**Harvey** (3–3)	Cloyd (0–1)	**Francisco** (22)	42,882	61–69	W4
131	August 30	@ Phillies	2–3	Kendrick (8–9)	**Niese** (10–8)	Papelbon (30)	43,141	61–70	L1
132	August 31	@ Marlins	3–0	**Dickey** (17–4)	Eovaldi (4–10)		23,099	62–70	W1

September (11–16)

#	Date	Opponent	Score	Win	Loss	Save	Attendance	Record	Report
133	September 1	@ Marlins	5–3	**Ramírez** (3–3)	Cishek (4–2)	**Francisco** (23)	26,402	63–70	W2
134	September 2	@ Marlins	5–1	**Young** (4–7)	Buehrle (12–12)		25,333	64–70	W3
135	September 3	@ Cardinals	4–5	Kelly (5–6)	**McHugh** (0–1)	Motte (33)	40,952	64–71	L1
136	September 4	@ Cardinals	1–5	García (4–6)	**Harvey** (3–4)		34,108	64–72	L2
137	September 5	@ Cardinals	6–2	**Dickey** (18–4)	Wainwright (13–12)		30,090	65–72	W1
138	September 7	Braves	0–3	Maholm (12–9)	**Niese** (10–9)	Kimbrel (35)	24,071	65–73	L1
139	September 8	Braves	3–11	Medlen (8–1)	**Hefner** (2–6)		25,603	65–74	L2
140	September 9	Braves	2–3 (10)	Kimbrel (1–1)	**Parnell** (4–4)	Moylan (1)	23,161	65–75	L3
141	September 10	Nationals	1–5	Gonzalez (19–7)	**McHugh** (0–2)		21,923	65–76	L4
142	September 11	Nationals	3–5	Gorzelanny (4–2)	**Dickey** (18–5)	Clippard (31)	22,596	65–77	L5
143	September 12	Nationals	0–2	Lannan (3–0)	**Harvey** (3–5)	Storen (2)	21,205	65–78	L6
144	September 14	@ Brewers	7–3	**Niese** (11–9)	Fiers (9–8)		38,216	66–78	W1
145	September 15	@ Brewers	6–9	Kintzler (2–0)	**Mejía** (0–1)		38,108	66–79	L1
146	September 16	@ Brewers	0–3	Peralta (2–0)	**Young** (4–8)	Axford (29)	38,677	66–80	L2
147	September 17	Phillies	1–3	Lee (6–7)	**Dickey** (18–6)	Papelbon (35)	20,527	66–81	L3
–	September 18	Phillies	Postponed (rain) (to be made up on 9/20)						
148	September 19	Phillies	2–3	Horst (2–0)	**Edgin** (1–2)	Papelbon (36)	21,741	66–82	L4
149	September 20	Phillies	1–16	Cloyd (2–1)	**Hefner** (2–7)		20,010	66–83	L5
150	September 21	Marlins	7–3	**Niese** (12–9)	Turner (2–4)		25,446	67–83	W1
151	September 22	Marlins	4–3	**Dickey** (19–6)	Buehrle (13–13)	**Rauch** (4)	30,332	68–83	W2
152	September 23	Marlins	3–2	**Parnell** (5–4)	Webb (4–3)		26,923	69–83	W3
153	September 24	Pirates	6–2	**Mejía** (1–1)	McPherson (0–2)		22,072	70–83	W4
154	September 25	Pirates	6–10	Rodríguez (12–13)	**McHugh** (0–3)		25,286	70–84	L1
155	September 26	Pirates	6–0	**Hefner** (3–7)	Locke (0–3)		22,890	71–84	W1
156	September 27	Pirates	6–5	**Dickey** (20–6)	Correia (11–11)	**Parnell** (5)	31,506	72–84	W2
157	September 28	@ Braves	3–1	**Niese** (13–9)	Hudson (16–7)	**Parnell** (6)	51,910	73–84	W3
158	September 29	@ Braves	0–2	Minor (11–10)	**Young** (4–9)	Kimbrel (41)	48,310	73–85	L1
159	September 30	@ Braves	2–6	Medlen (10–1)	**Mejía** (1–2)	Kimbrel (42)	50,635	73–86	L2

October (1–2)

#	Date	Opponent	Score	Win	Loss	Save	Attendance	Record	Report
160	October 1	@ Marlins	2–3	Bell (4–5)	**Ramírez** (3–4)	Cishek (15)	24,543	73–87	L3
161	October 2	@ Marlins	3–4	Gaudin (4–2)	**McHugh** (0–4)		29,709	73–88	L4
162	October 3	@ Marlins	4–2	**Hefner** (4–7)	Koehler (0–1)	**Parnell** (7)	27,418	74–88	W1

=== Roster ===
2012 New York Mets
**Roster**
**Pitchers**: 46 Manny Acosta; 47 Miguel Batista; 27 Pedro Beato; 40 Tim Byrdak; 77 D. J. Carrasco; 73 Robert Carson; 43 R. A. Dickey; 66 Josh Edgin; 61 Jack Egbert; 27 Jeurys Familia; 48 Frank Francisco; 35 Dillon Gee; 45 Justin Hampson; 33 Matt Harvey; 53 Jeremy Hefner; 36 Collin McHugh; 32 Jenrry Mejía; 49 Jon Niese; 38 Garrett Olson; 39 Bobby Parnell; 34 Mike Pelfrey; 62 Elvin Ramírez; 52 Ramón Ramírez; 60 Jon Rauch; 57 Johan Santana; 63 Chris Schwinden; 55 Chris Young	**Catchers**: 16 Rob Johnson; 4 Mike Nickeas; 6 Kelly Shoppach; 30 Josh Thole; **Infielders**: 13 Ronny Cedeño; 29 Ike Davis; 19 Zach Lutz; 28 Daniel Murphy; 6 Omar Quintanilla; 33 Vinny Rottino; 11 Rubén Tejada; 2 Justin Turner; 5 David Wright; **Outfielders**: 23 Mike Baxter; 44 Jason Bay; 21 Lucas Duda; 12 Scott Hairston; 15 Fred Lewis; 9 Kirk Nieuwenhuis; 56 Andrés Torres; 1 Jordany Valdespin; **Other batters**: 3 Josh Satin	**Manager**: 10 Terry Collins; **Coaches**: 25 Ricky Bones (bullpen); 7 Bob Geren (bench); 26 Tom Goodwin (first base); 51 Dave Hudgens (hitting); 78 Eric Langill (bullpen catcher); 79,54 Dave Racaniello (bullpen catcher); 18 Tim Teufel (third base); 59 Dan Warthen (pitching)

== Player stats ==
=== Batting ===
Note: G = Games played; AB = At bats; R = Runs scored; H = Hits; 2B = Doubles; 3B = Triples; HR = Home runs; RBI = Runs batted in; SB = Stolen bases; BB = Base on balls; AVG = Batting average;

Player	G	AB	R	H	2B	3B	HR	RBI	SB	BB	AVG
Mike Baxter	89	179	26	47	14	2	3	17	5	25	.263
Jason Bay	70	194	21	32	2	0	8	20	5	19	.165
Ronny Cedeño	78	166	18	43	11	1	4	22	0	17	.259
Ike Davis	156	519	66	118	26	0	32	90	0	61	.227
Lucas Duda	121	401	43	96	15	0	15	57	1	51	.239
Scott Hairston	134	377	52	99	25	3	20	57	8	19	.263
Rob Johnson	17	52	3	13	2	0	0	4	0	4	.250
Fred Lewis	18	20	2	3	0	0	0	0	0	4	.150
Zach Lutz	7	11	1	1	0	0	0	0	0	0	.091
Daniel Murphy	156	571	62	166	40	3	6	65	10	36	.291
Mike Nickeas	47	109	8	19	3	0	1	13	0	8	.174
Kirk Nieuwenhuis	91	282	40	71	12	1	7	28	4	25	.252
Omar Quintanilla	29	70	13	18	5	0	1	4	0	8	.257
Vinny Rottino	18	33	8	6	1	0	2	5	3	6	.182
Josh Satin	1	1	0	0	0	0	0	0	0	0	.000
Kelly Shoppach	28	79	7	16	2	0	3	10	0	5	.203
Ruben Tejada	114	464	53	134	26	0	1	25	4	27	.289
Josh Thole	104	321	24	75	15	0	1	21	0	27	.234
Andrés Torres	132	374	47	86	17	7	3	35	13	52	.230
Justin Turner	94	171	20	46	13	1	2	19	1	9	.269
Jordany Valdespin	94	191	28	46	9	1	8	26	10	10	.241
David Wright	156	581	91	178	41	2	21	93	15	81	.306
Pitcher Totals	162	284	17	44	7	0	1	14	0	9	.155
Team totals	162	5450	650	1357	286	21	139	625	79	503	.249

=== Pitching ===
Note: G = Games pitched; GS = Games started; W = Wins; L = Losses; SV = Saves; IP = Innings pitched; H = Hits allowed; R = Runs allowed; ER = Earned runs allowed; BB = Walks allowed; K = Strikeouts; ERA = Earned run average;

Player	G	GS	W	L	SV	IP	H	R	ER	BB	K	ERA
Manny Acosta	45	0	1	3	1	47.1	48	38	34	25	46	6.46
Miguel Batista	30	5	1	3	0	46.2	53	28	25	31	94	4.82
Pedro Beato	7	0	0	0	0	4.1	5	5	5	2	5	10.38
Tim Byrdak	56	0	2	2	0	30.2	18	16	15	18	34	4.40
D.J. Carrasco	4	0	0	0	0	3.2	6	3	3	0	3	7.36
Robert Carson	17	0	0	0	0	13.1	13	7	7	4	5	4.73
R.A. Dickey	34	33	20	6	0	233.2	192	78	71	54	230	2.73
Josh Edgin	34	0	1	2	0	25.2	19	14	13	10	30	4.56
Jack Egbert	1	0	0	0	0	0.2	0	0	0	0	0	0.00
Jeurys Familia	8	1	0	0	0	12.1	10	8	8	9	10	5.84
Frank Francisco	48	0	1	3	23	42.1	47	27	26	21	47	4.13
Dillon Gee	17	17	6	7	0	109.2	108	56	50	29	97	4.10
Justin Hampson	13	0	0	0	0	10.0	6	4	2	5	4	1.80
Matt Harvey	10	10	3	5	0	59.1	42	19	18	26	70	2.73
Jeremy Hefner	26	13	4	7	0	93.2	110	55	53	18	62	5.09
Rob Johnson	1	0	0	0	0	1.0	0	0	0	0	1	0.00
Collin McHugh	8	4	0	4	0	21.1	27	21	18	8	17	7.59
Jenrry Mejía	5	3	1	2	0	16.0	20	10	10	9	8	5.63
Jon Niese	30	30	13	9	0	190.1	174	77	72	49	155	3.40
Garrett Olson	1	0	0	0	0	0.1	3	4	4	1	0	108.00
Bobby Parnell	74	0	5	4	7	68.2	65	24	19	20	61	2.49
Mike Pelfrey	3	3	0	0	0	19.2	24	5	5	4	13	2.29
Elvin Ramírez	20	0	0	1	0	21.1	24	13	13	20	22	5.48
Ramón Ramírez	58	0	3	4	1	63.2	58	33	30	35	52	4.24
Jon Rauch	73	0	3	7	4	57.2	45	28	23	12	42	3.59
Johan Santana	21	21	6	9	0	117.0	117	65	63	39	111	4.85
Chris Schwinden	3	2	0	1	0	8.2	15	13	12	3	1	12.46
Chris Young	20	20	4	9	0	115.0	119	58	53	36	80	4.15
Team totals	162	162	74	88	36	1434.0	1368	709	651	488	1240	4.09

== Farm system ==
Level	Team	League	Manager
AAA	Buffalo Bisons	International League	Wally Backman
AA	Binghamton Mets	Eastern League	Pedro López
A	St. Lucie Mets	Florida State League	Ryan Ellis
A	Savannah Sand Gnats	South Atlantic League	Luis Rojas
A-Short Season	Brooklyn Cyclones	New York–Penn League	Rich Donnelly
Rookie	Kingsport Mets	Appalachian League	José Leger
