= Josh Edgin =

American baseball player (born 1986)

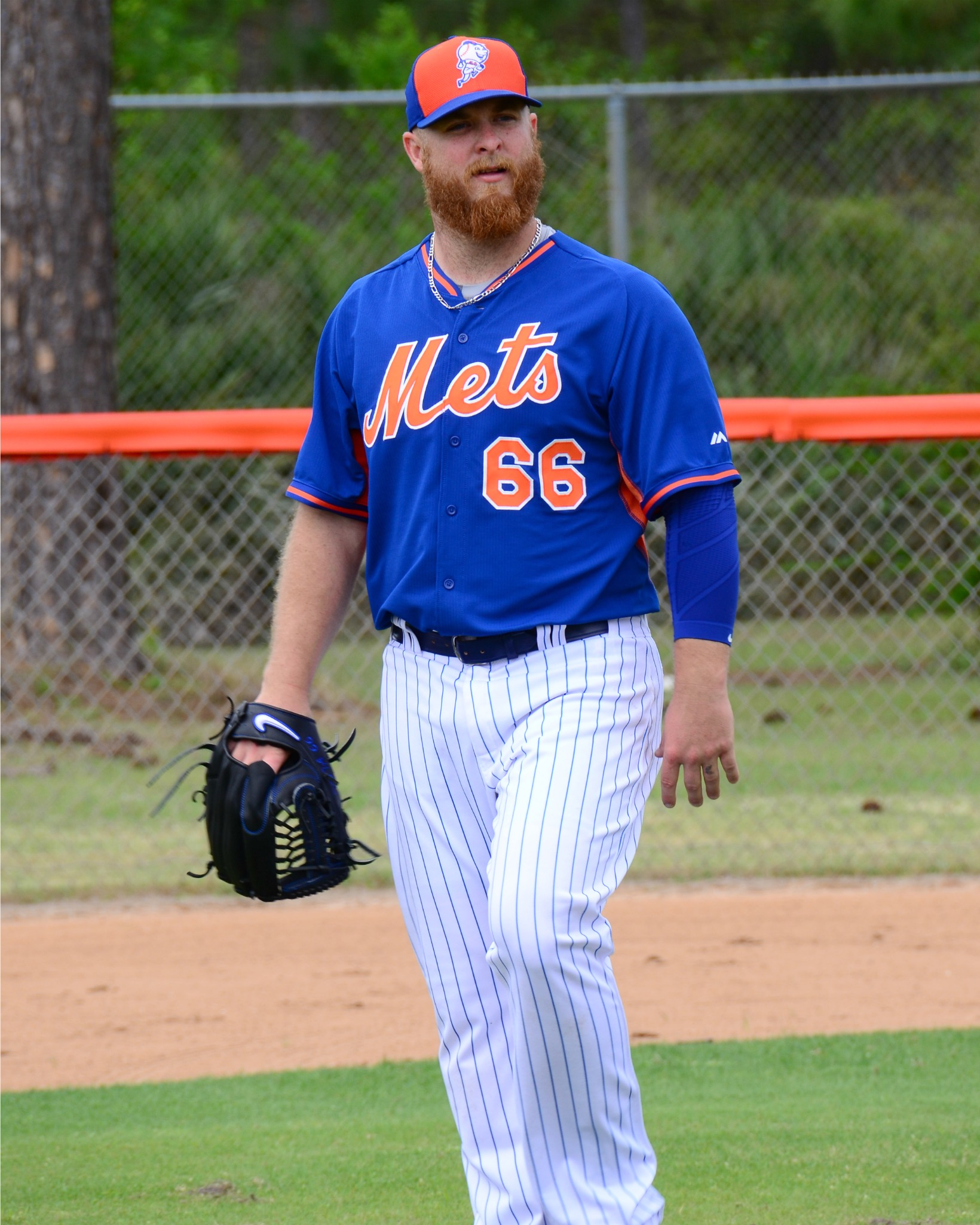
- Edgin with the New York Mets in 2015
- Pitcher
- Born: December 17, 1986 (age 39); Lewistown, Pennsylvania, U.S.
- Batted: Right Threw: Left

MLB debut
- July 13, 2012, for the New York Mets

Last MLB appearance
- July 28, 2017, for the New York Mets

MLB statistics
- Win–loss record: 4–4
- Earned run average: 3.49
- Strikeouts: 116
- Stats at Baseball Reference

Teams
- New York Mets (2012–2014, 2016–2017)

Joshua Wayne Edgin (born December 17, 1986) is an American former professional baseball pitcher. He made his MLB debut with the New York Mets in 2012 and last appeared in MLB in 2017. Before he began his professional career, he played college baseball at Ohio State University and Francis Marion University.

== Amateur career ==
Edgin attended high school at Mercersburg Academy in Mercersburg, Pennsylvania. There, he won the state championship in wrestling as a junior, finishing fourth in national competition. However, a torn labrum in his non-pitching shoulder forced him to give up wrestling, as he declined to have surgery to avoid missing the baseball season.

Edgin then enrolled at Ohio State University (OSU), where he played college baseball for the Ohio State Buckeyes baseball team, competing in the Big Ten Conference of the National Collegiate Athletic Association's (NCAA) Division I, in 2007 and 2008. At first a starting pitcher, OSU coaches began to use Edgin as a relief pitcher in his sophomore season.

The Atlanta Braves drafted him in the 50th round of the 2009 MLB draft, 1,498th overall. However, the Braves did not sign him, as they had no minor league team to assign Edgin. Wanting an opportunity to start, Edgin transferred to Francis Marion University, where he pitched for the Francis Marion Patriots in NCAA's Division II in 2009 and 2010. Edgin also Pitched for the Forest City Owls in 2009, winning the Coastal Plain League championship with a record of 51–9, also being named National Champions according to Perfect Game.

== Professional career ==
=== New York Mets ===
==== Minor leagues ====
The New York Mets selected Edgin in the 30th round of the 2010 MLB draft, 902nd overall, and he signed. Edgin split the 2010 season between the Kingsport Mets of the rookie-level Appalachian League and the Savannah Sand Gnats of the Single-A South Atlantic League, appearing in 18 games for Kingsport and two for Savannah; he posted an earned run average (ERA) of 2.84 and a record of 0–1 in 32 2/3 innings with Kingsport, striking out 41 and walking 12, and pitched three scoreless innings for Savannah, striking out five giving him an overall ERA for the season of 2.60 and an overall record of 0–1 with 46 strikeouts and 12 walks.

Edgin split the 2011 season between Savannah and the St. Lucie Mets of the High-A Florida State League. With Savannah, he appeared in 24 games with a record of 1–0 and an ERA of 0.87 over 31 innings of work, and he pitched in 25 games for St. Lucie, going 2–1 with an ERA of 2.06 in 35 innings. He had 41 strikeouts and 10 walks with Savannah and 35 strikeouts and 13 walks with St. Lucie.

==== 2012 ====
The Mets invited Edgin to spring training in 2012 after Tim Byrdak required surgery. To start the season, they assigned him to the Binghamton Mets of the Double-A Eastern League, where he served as the team's closer. After he made six appearances with Binghamton in which he posted an ERA of 1.42 in 6 1/3 innings with five strikeouts and two walks, the Mets promoted Edgin to the Buffalo Bisons of the Triple-A International League. He appeared in 35 games for Buffalo, with a record of 3–2, an ERA of 3.89, and 40 strikeouts and 18 walks in 37 innings of work.

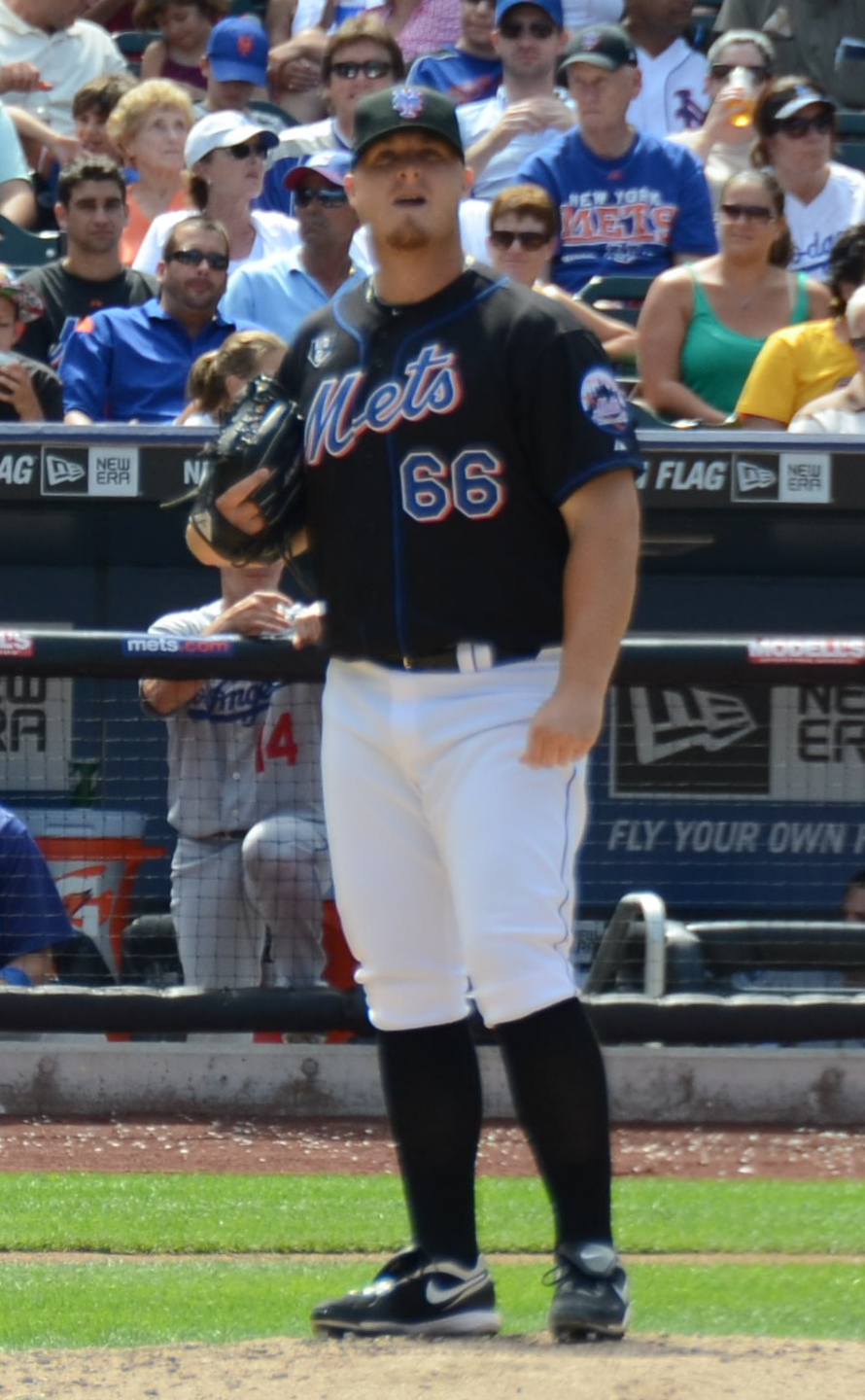
Edgin with the New York Mets in 2012

The Mets called Edgin up to the major leagues on July 13, 2012. He made his debut that same day against the Atlanta Braves. Edgin came in to pitch in the fifth inning and stranded three runners by striking out both Juan Francisco and Michael Bourn, his first two major-league strikeouts. In the sixth inning, however, Edgin record only two outs, one of them his third major-league strikeout, and allowed two runs on two hits – a solo home run to Chipper Jones and a double to Freddie Freeman.

On September 20, 2012, the Mets announced that they would shut down Edgin after one more relief appearance due to his workload over the season. He finished the 2012 season with a 1–2 record in 34 appearances for the Mets, with a 4.56 ERA in 25 2/3 innings pitched, 30 strikeouts, and a walks plus hits per inning pitched (WHIP) of 1.130 while giving up 19 hits, 14 runs (13 of them earned), five home runs, and 10 walks.

==== 2013 ====
Edgin made the Mets' roster for Opening Day in 2013. Deciding that Edgin needed some time in the minor leagues to work on his pitching, and not wanting to send him to their Triple-A affiliate, the Las Vegas 51s of the Pacific Coast League, because of struggles the Las Vegas pitching staff was having, the Mets demoted Edgin on April 27 to the Binghamton Mets to make room for Shaun Marcum on their roster. On May 14, the Mets promoted him to play with the 51s. He returned to the Mets on June 9 with Collin Cowgill and Josh Satin as they replaced Ike Davis, Robert Carson, and Mike Baxter on the Mets′ roster. On August 2, 2013, the Mets placed Edgin on the disabled list for an expected four to six weeks after he suffered a stress fracture in a rib. replacing him on the active roster with Pedro Feliciano. On September 24, the Mets reinstated Jordany Valdespin following his 50-game suspension for his involvement in the Biogenesis clinic scandal and transferred Edgin to the 60-day disabled list to make room for Valdespin on the active roster. On October 31, Edgin was among seven players reactivated off of the disabled list. Edgin finished the 2012 season with 1–1 record in 34 appearances for the Mets and a 3.77 ERA in 28 2/3 innings pitched with one save, 20 strikeouts, and a WHIP of 1.326 while giving up 26 hits, 12 runs, two home runs, and 12 walks. In the minor leagues during the season, he had pitched to a 7.88 ERA in eight innings pitched over five games with 10 strikeouts and five walks while with Binghamton and to an ERA of 5.91 in 10 2/3 innings over 11 games with Las Vegas, where he had a record of 2–0 and 12 strikeouts and gave up two walks.

==== 2014 ====
Edgin received an invitation to major-league spring training in 2014, but on March 10 the Mets optioned him to Las Vegas. He appeared in 17 games for the 51s – with a record of 3–0, an ERA of 4.97, 12 strikeouts and 11 walks in 12 2/3 innings – before the Mets called him up to the major leagues on May 15. On August 27, the Mets revealed that Edgin had inflammation in his pitching elbow, but said that they did not expect him to miss any time due to the inflammation. On September 1, however, Edgin was diagnosed with bone spurs. A day later he received cortisone shots in his elbow. He finished the season with the Mets, making 47 appearances for them, with a 1–0 record, a 1.32 ERA in 27 1/3 innings pitched, 28 strikeouts and a WHIP of 0.915 while giving up 19 hits, six runs (four earned), two home runs, and six walks.

==== 2015 ====
During spring training in 2015, doctors detected a bone chip in the ulnar collateral ligament of the elbow joint in his left arm. He underwent ulnar collateral ligament reconstruction, popularly known as "Tommy John surgery," to correct the condition, effectively ending his 2015 season. On April 6, the Mets officially placed him on the 60-day disabled list to make room on the 40-man roster for César Puello, who they placed on the 15-day disabled list. The Mets activated Edgin from the 60-day disabled list on November 3, after the conclusion of the 2015 season.

==== 2016 ====
Edgin began the 2016 season on the 15-day disabled list, returning to action with a rehabilitation stint with St. Lucie in which he pitched 4 1/3 innings in six appearances with an ERA of 2.08, seven strikeouts, and a walk, followed by a rehabilitation assignment to Las Vegas. Upon the rehabilitation assignment's conclusion on May 10, the Mets immediately optioned him to Las Vegas. On August 2, the Mets called Edgin up from the Las Vegas to the major leagues. They optioned back to Las Vegas on August, then called him up again on September 6. He finished the season with 16 MLB appearances in which he had a 5.23 ERA over 10 1/3 innings with 11 strikeouts and six walks and a 1–0 record. He also appeared in 37 games for Las Vegas during 2016, posting an ERA of 3.24 in 33 1/3 innings of work with 38 strikeouts and 20 walks and a record of 2–2.

==== 2017 ====
The Mets assigned Edgin to Las Vegas on March 30, 2017, but then named him to their roster for Opening Day on April 3. The Mets designated him for assignment on July 30, then outrighted him to Las Vegas on August 2, and Las Vegas placed him on the seven-day disabled list on August 12. Overall, Edgin pitched in three games for Las Vegas, with a record of 0–1, an ERA of 2.70, two strikeouts, and three walks in 3 1/3 innings pitched, and in 46 games for New York, with a record of 0–1, an ERA of 3.65, 27 strikeouts, and 18 walks in 37 innings of work. He elected free agency on October 4, 2017.

=== Baltimore Orioles ===
On November 27, 2017, Edgin signed a minor-league deal with the Baltimore Orioles that included an invitation to major-league spring training in 2018. The Orioles assigned him to the Norfolk Tides in the Triple-A International League on April 2, 2018. He made 12 appearances for the Tides, working 18 2/3 innings, striking out 25, walking five, and posting a 4.34 ERA. The Orioles released him on May 18.

=== Washington Nationals ===
On May 23, 2018, Edgin signed a minor-league deal with the Washington Nationals. They assigned him to play with the Syracuse Chiefs in the Triple-A International League.

Edgin announced his retirement on January 30, 2019, according to Max Wildstein on Twitter.

== Coaching career ==
Edgin was named the head baseball coach at Mercersburg in 2022.
