= Josh Satin =

American baseball player (born 1984)

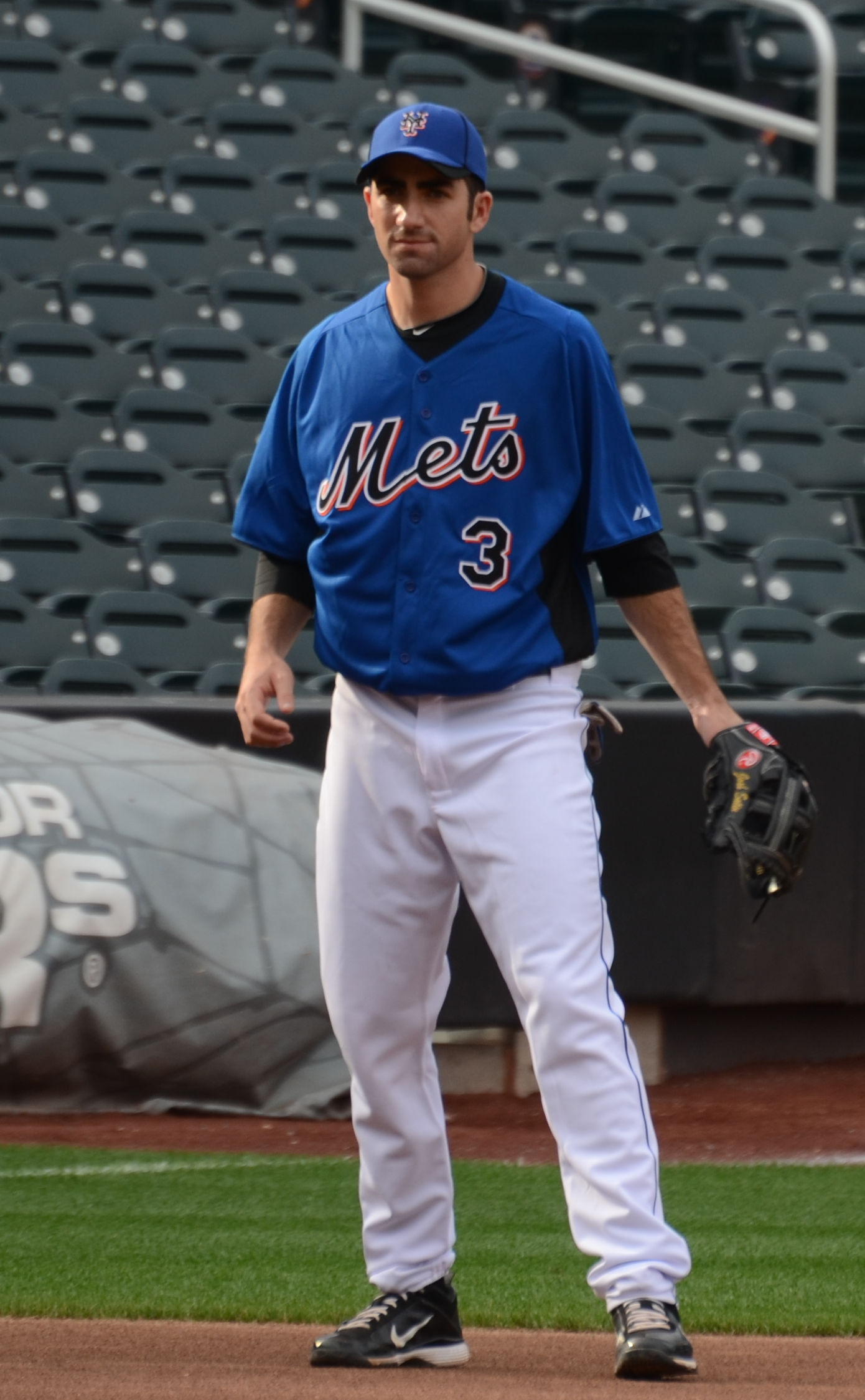
- Satin with the New York Mets
- First baseman / Third baseman
- Born: December 23, 1984 (age 41); Hidden Hills, California, U.S.
- Batted: Right Threw: Right

MLB debut
- September 4, 2011, for the New York Mets

Last MLB appearance
- September 25, 2014, for the New York Mets

MLB statistics
- Batting average: .243
- Home runs: 3
- Runs batted in: 22
- Stats at Baseball Reference

Teams
- New York Mets (2011–2014)

Joshua Blake Satin (born December 23, 1984) is an American former professional baseball corner infielder. Satin played first base, second base, and third base. During his career, he played in Major League Baseball (MLB) for the New York Mets, as well as in the Cincinnati Reds and San Diego Padres organizations.

He was a first-team college All-American at the University of California, Berkeley. The Mets drafted him in the sixth round of the 2008 Major League Baseball draft. Satin batted .303 in 2008 in the minor leagues, and .288 in 2009 while being voted a South Atlantic League All-Star. He hit .311 and was a Florida State League All-Star in 2010. In 2011, he batted .325 for Binghamton while leading the league in on-base percentage (.423) and OPS (.962), as he was voted an Eastern League All-Star. He also played in Triple-A, batting .347 with a .410 on-base percentage with the Buffalo Bisons.

He made his MLB debut for the Mets on September 4, 2011, and played in 15 games. In June 2012 Satin rejoined the Mets, but he was designated for assignment three days later. In June 2013, he was again called up to the Mets, after batting .305 in Triple-A. He tied a Mets rookie record set in 1977, by reaching base in 29 consecutive games that he started, and for the season batted .279 (.317 against left-handers). Satin twice played third base for the Israeli national baseball team during the World Baseball Classic.

== Early and personal life ==
Satin is Jewish, and was born in Hidden Hills, California. His parents are David and Gail Satin. He also has two younger brothers, Danny and Dylan Satin. His mother at one time co-owned a clothing store with the wife of comedian Howie Mandel. He and outfielder Blake Gailen—also a member of the Israeli national baseball team—have been friends since they were children, and Gailen attended Satin's bar mitzvah.

For grade school he went to Abraham Joshua Heschel Day School. In high school, playing for the Harvard-Westlake School Wolverines in Studio City, Los Angeles, Satin was a three-time all-league selection and the MVP of the 2002 Los Angeles Daily News Tournament. In 2002, he played shortstop and batted .500 with 11 homers. As a senior, he batted .478 with 10 home runs, was first-team All-CIF Southern Section, and was Los Angeles Times All-Region. He played alongside future major league outfielder Brennan Boesch. Academically, he scored 1,390 on the SAT. He was inducted into the school's Athletic Hall of Fame in 2009.

On November 9, 2013, Satin married Allyson Murrow.

After retiring from baseball, Satin became the director of acquisitions for Gelt, a real estate investment company.

== College ==
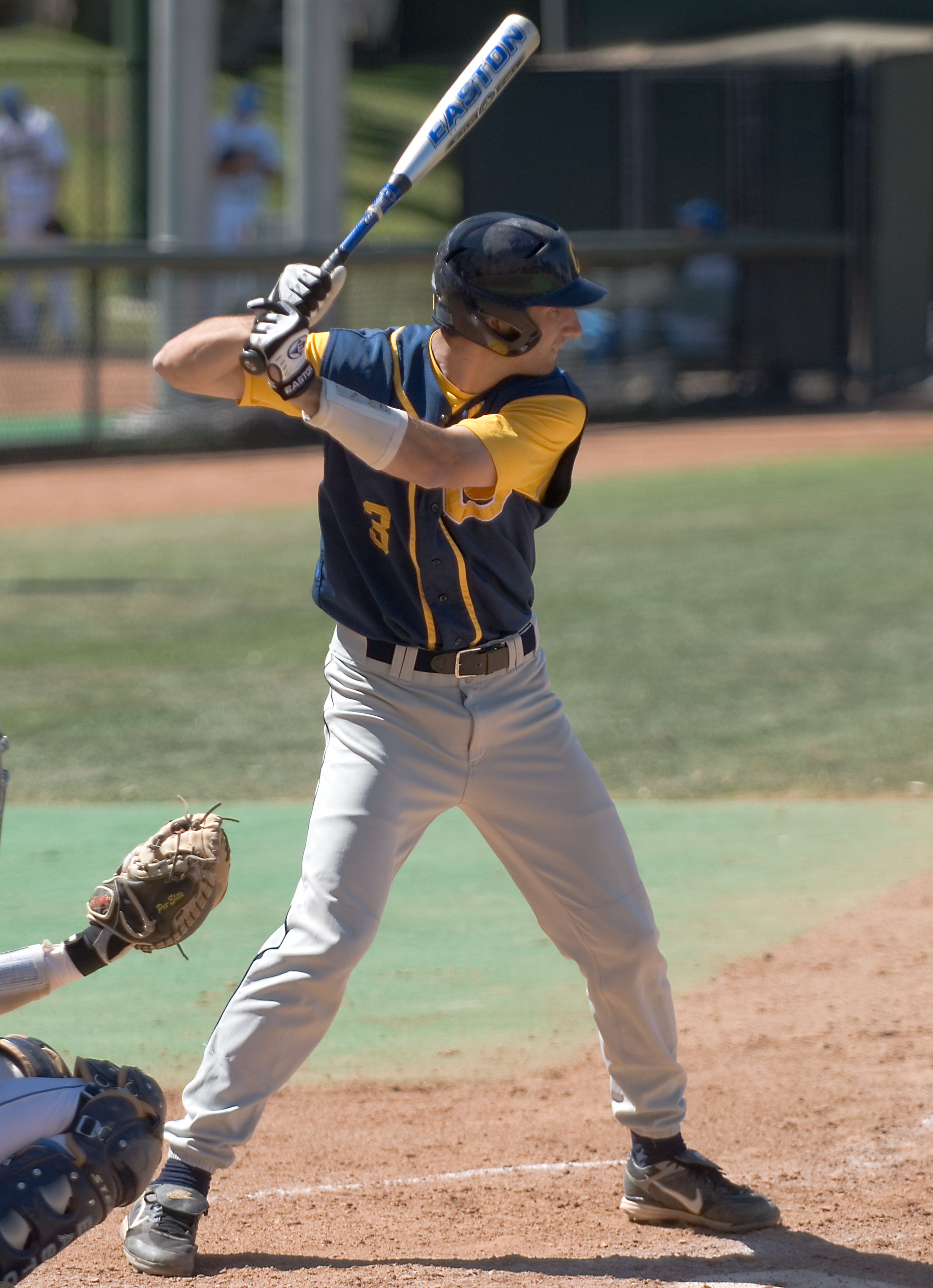
Satin batting for Cal in 2007

Satin attended the University of California, Berkeley. There, in his freshman year in 2005 he played second base for the California Golden Bears baseball team. He batted .348 (7th in the Pac-10) with 77 hits (8th in the Pac-10), and led the team with 26 multiple-hit games. He was the team's 2005 Freshman of the Year, and co-winner of the Clint Evans Award as the team's most valuable player (along with his former high school teammate who joined him at Berkeley, Brennan Boesch). As a junior in 2007 he batted .287.

He played collegiate summer baseball in the Cape Cod League in both 2006 (for the Orleans Cardinals) and 2007 (for the Bourne Braves), was voted an All-Star both years, and was named the East Division MVP during the league's 2006 All-Star Game.

Satin was a Collegiate Baseball Freshman All-American in 2005, and first-team All-Pac-10. He is the only Cal freshman to earn both of those awards other than Xavier Nady, who won them in 1998. Jewish Sports Review named Satin to its All-America First Team, NCAA Division 1, of the best Jewish college players in the U.S. in both 2005 (along with Ryan Braun) and in 2007 (along with Ike Davis, Ryan Lavarnway, and Michael Schwimer).

In 2008, his final year, he batted .379/.500/.723, with 18 home runs in 195 at-bats. He also set the school hitting streak record, with 27. That year he was a Baseball America first team All-American (joining among others future Mets teammate Ike Davis). He was also a Rivals.com second team All American, Collegiate Baseball Louisville Slugger third-team All-American, and first-team All-Pac-10. He is 5th all-time for the school in career hits (246) and total bases (381), 6th in RBIs (153), 8th in career walks (119), 9th in career home runs (29; tied with Jerry Goff), and 3rd for the school in season-best slugging percentage (.723; 2008) and home runs (18; 2008). He graduated with a degree in political science.

== Professional career ==
=== New York Mets ===
==== Minor leagues ====
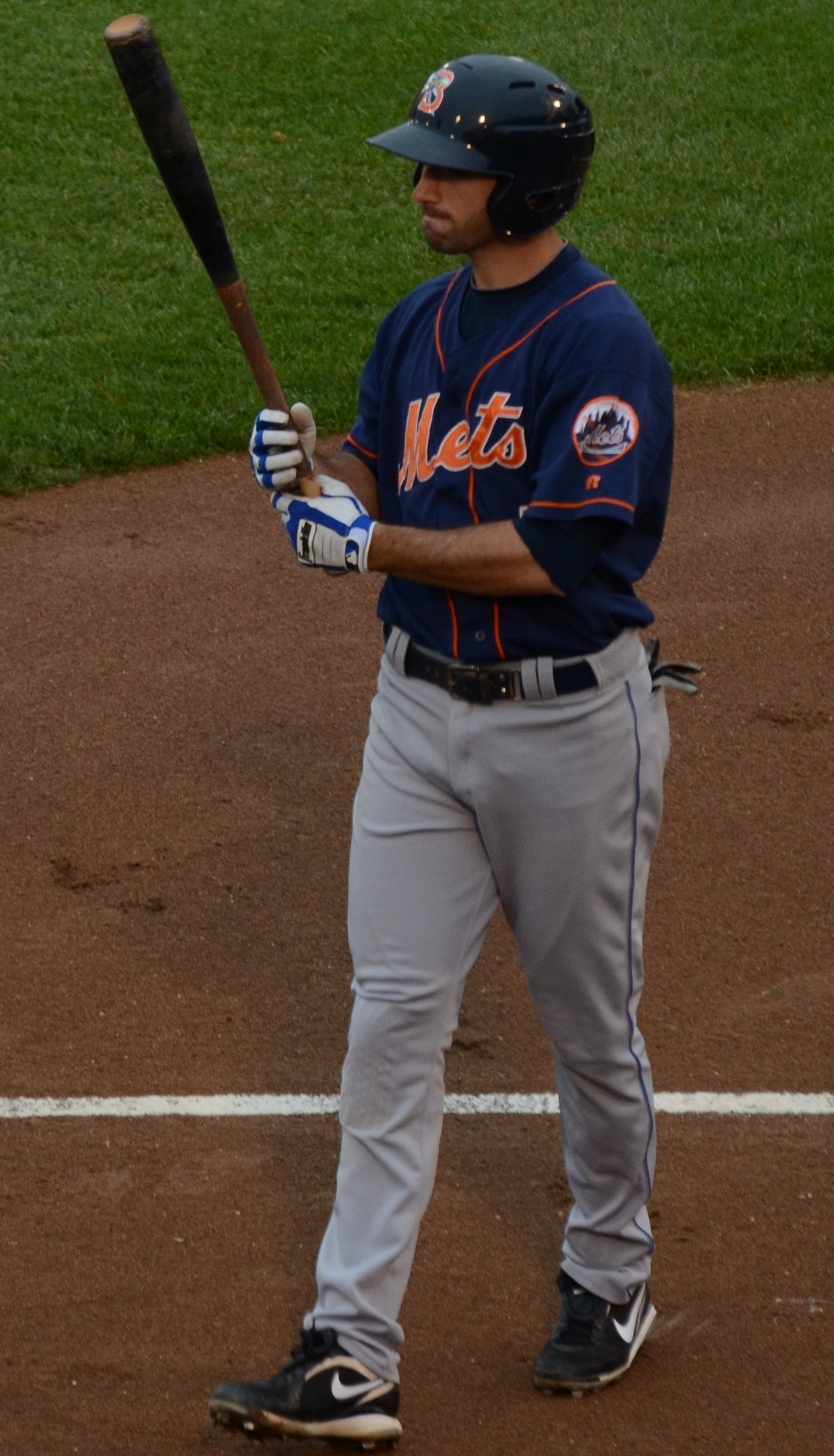
Satin during his tenure with the Binghamton Mets, Double-A affiliates of the New York Mets, in 2011.

Satin was drafted by the Mets in the sixth round (194th overall) of the 2008 Major League Baseball draft. He signed for $25,000. After signing, he batted a combined .303/.370/.503 for the Kingsport Mets in the Rookie-level Appalachian League and the Brooklyn Cyclones in the Low-A New York–Penn League in 2008.

In 2009, Satin hit .284/.385/.418 for the Savannah Sand Gnats in the Low-A South Atlantic League, with 38 doubles and 73 walks. He was voted a SAL Mid-Season All-Star. Still, he recalled years later, "You just look around and you're like, 'I'm really far from the big leagues.' I used to tell myself in Low A, 'Well, I'll just go to law school.'" He closed out the season by playing seven games for the St. Lucie Mets in the High-A Florida State League, batting .364/.464/.591.

Playing for St. Lucie in at the beginning of 2010, Satin batted .316/.406/.459. Promoted to the Binghamton Mets in the Double-A Eastern League, he hit .308/.395/.472. He batted .311/.399/.467 with 39 doubles and 66 walks over the two levels. In 2010, he was a FSL Mid-Season All-Star, and the FSL All-Star Game MVP. John Sickels gave him a C grade because he was older than his competition, but wrote in his 2011 Baseball Prospect Book: "provides plenty of doubles, can draw a walk, and seems to hit .300 in his sleep ... my gut likes him." Playing for the Mesa Solar Sox in the Arizona Fall League after the regular season, he batted .390/.468/.512.

In 2011, Satin batted .325/.423/.538 for Binghamton in 338 at-bats, with a league-leading 35 doubles at the time of his promotion, and 11 home runs. He led the league in on-base percentage (.423) and OPS (.962), and was 7th in Double-A in batting average and 10th in slugging percentage. . He became the first player in Binghamton's 20-year history to hit for the cycle, on June 24. In April 2011 he won an Eastern League Player of the Week Award, and he was both an Eastern League Mid-Season and Post-Season All Star. He was named to the Topps Double-A All-Star Team. He hit .347/.410/.453 in 95 at-bats after he was promoted to the Buffalo Bisons in the Triple-A International League, through August 19.

Satin's 2011 season totals were a .330 batting average with 42 doubles, 12 home runs, and 66 walks.

In June 2013, Satin was hitting .305/.418/.491 (and batting .354 against left-handers) with 9 home runs and 32 RBI in 59 games with the Triple-A Las Vegas 51s (the Mets had changed Triple-A affiliations from Buffalo to Las Vegas), when he was called up to the Mets. Through 2013, Satin's career minor league batting statistics were .301/.397/.461, with 413 walks and 618 strikeouts in 2,630 at-bats.

==== Major leagues ====
Satin was promoted to the major leagues for the first time on September 1, 2011. Mets manager Terry Collins called his promotion "one of the great stories in this organization". Collins said he would most probably be used as a reserve infielder, primarily at first base and third base, but that the team would like to play him in the outfield as well. In his debut on September 4, Satin singled in his first at-bat.

Satin was recalled to the Mets on June 3, 2012, to fill the roster slot vacated when Mike Baxter was placed on the disabled list. After appearing in only one game, Satin was designated for assignment on June 6, in order to clear space on the 40-man roster for Pedro Beato, who was returning from the 60-day disabled list. Satin cleared waivers and returned to the Bisons on June 8. He struck out in his only major league at-bat for the year.

In spring training in 2013, Satin batted .455 with a .647 on-base percentage in 16 plate appearances, but was sent to Triple-A to start the season. On June 9, 2013, Satin was promoted to the Mets as Ike Davis was demoted. He tied a Mets rookie record set by Steve Henderson in 1977, by reaching base in 29 consecutive games that he started. For the season, he batted .279 (.317 against left-handers) with a .376 on-base percentage. His on-base percentage was the second-highest among major league rookies with at least 175 at bats, and the second-highest on the Mets.

Satin began 2014 with the Mets as the right-handed part of an unusual three-man platoon at first base. While Lucas Duda won the everyday job, Satin struggled in limited playing time, hitting just .107 in 15 games, and was demoted on May 10. Satin spent much of the season at Las Vegas before being recalled when the major-league rosters expanded on September 1. After his call-up, Satin made just nine plate appearances, going 0-for-7 to finish the season with a .086 batting average. On October 31, Satin was removed from the 40-man roster and sent outright to Las Vegas; he subsequently rejected the assignment and elected free agency.

=== Cincinnati Reds ===
On November 22, 2014, Satin signed a minor league contract with the Cincinnati Reds organization. He played for the Triple–A Louisville Bats, batting .247 with four home runs in 70 games.

=== San Diego Padres ===
On March 7, 2016, Satin signed a minor league contract with the San Diego Padres organization. He played for the Triple–A El Paso Chihuahuas, and batted .182/.250/.273 in 49 plate appearances.

On June 9, 2016, Satin retired from baseball, saying that head injuries had taken a toll on his skills.

== Team Israel ==
Satin twice played third base for the Israeli national baseball team during the World Baseball Classic.

In September 2012, he played for Israel at the 2013 World Baseball Classic qualifying round. Satin was the starting third baseman during all three of Israel's games, while batting sixth. During the first game, Satin went 1 for 3 with 2 walks and scored twice. During the second game Satin went 1 for 2 while again walking twice. Israel's final game saw Satin going 1 for 6 with a strike out, ending the series batting .273, as Israel fell to Spain in extra innings in the qualifier finals, missing out on a spot in the World Baseball Classic.

Satin again played in the qualifying round for Israel at the 2017 World Baseball Classic, starting in the first two games batting sixth, before sitting out the final game. During both the first and second games Satin went hitless in three at bats, ending the series 0 for 6 with a strike out.

== See also ==
- List of Jewish Major League Baseball players

Preceded by Lucas Duda	Mets Organizational Player of the Year; 2011	Succeeded by Wilmer Flores
