= Mike Baxter =

American baseball player (born 1984)

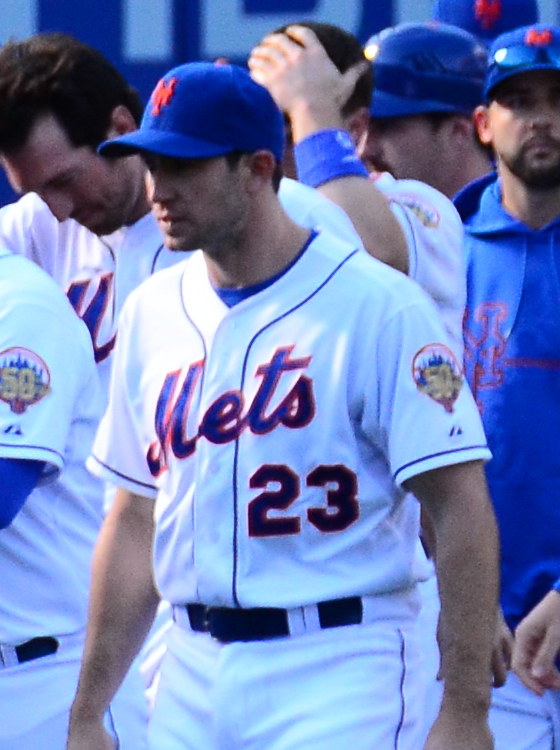
- Baxter with the New York Mets in 2012
- Outfielder / Coach
- Born: December 7, 1984 (age 41); Queens, New York, U.S.
- Batted: Left Threw: Right

MLB debut
- September 6, 2010, for the San Diego Padres

Last MLB appearance
- July 8, 2015, for the Chicago Cubs

MLB statistics
- Batting average: .228
- Home runs: 4
- Runs batted in: 28
- Stats at Baseball Reference

Teams
- San Diego Padres (2010); New York Mets (2011–2013); Los Angeles Dodgers (2014); Chicago Cubs (2015)

Michael Joseph Baxter (born December 7, 1984) is an American former professional baseball outfielder. He played in Major League Baseball (MLB) for the San Diego Padres, New York Mets, Los Angeles Dodgers and Chicago Cubs. He was also the hitting coach and recruiting coordinator for his alma Mater, Vanderbilt University.

== Early years ==
Baxter was born and raised in the Queens, New York neighborhood of Whitestone, where he attended St. Luke's Parish school and part of the Bayside Little League. He graduated from Archbishop Molloy High School in 2002. Baxter attended Columbia University, and he then attended Vanderbilt University. In 2004 and 2005, he played collegiate summer baseball with the Hyannis Mets of the Cape Cod Baseball League. He was selected by the San Diego Padres in the fourth round (128th overall) of the 2005 amateur entry draft.

== Professional career ==
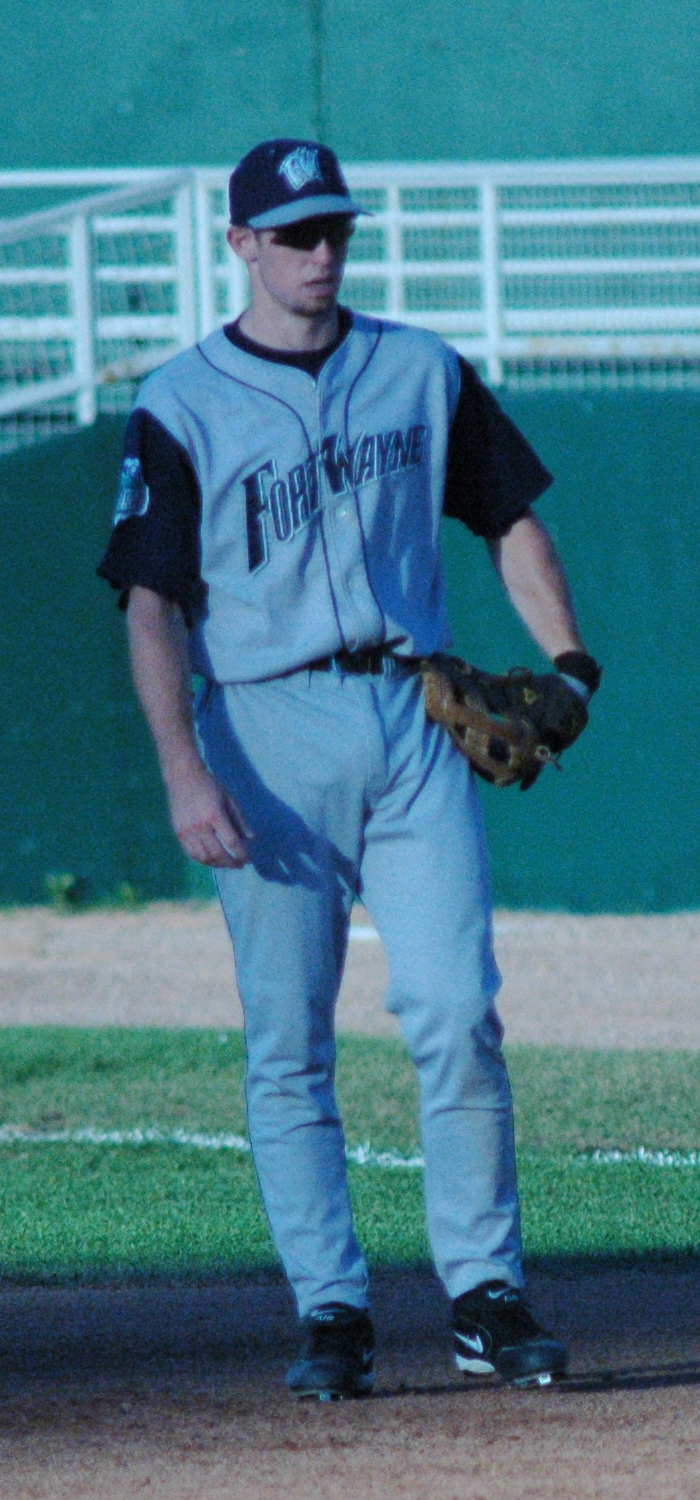
Baxter playing for the Fort Wayne Wizards in 2005

=== San Diego Padres ===
Baxter's contract was purchased by the Padres and he was promoted to the major leagues on September 6, 2010 and hit a pop fly to second base off Vicente Padilla of the Los Angeles Dodgers in his first at-bat, as a pinch hitter. He appeared in 9 games that season, all as a pinch hitter, with his only hit being on September 26 off Francisco Cordero of the Cincinnati Reds.

=== New York Mets ===
==== 2011 ====
After being placed on the 60-day disabled list in March 2011, Baxter began his rehab in Single-A, before being claimed off waivers by the New York Mets on July 22. He was called up by New York on August 8. In his first game, he hit an RBI double against the San Diego Padres to bring the Mets closer to what would end up being a come-from-behind victory. On September 28, the final game of the Mets' season, Baxter hit his first career major league home run. It gave the Mets a 3–0 lead, and was the last home run and RBI of the season for the team. Baxter was non-tendered by the Mets on December 13 and became a free agent. On December 16, he re-signed with the Mets on a minor league contract that included an invitation to spring training.

==== 2012 ====
In 2012, Baxter began the season on the Mets active roster as a reserve outfielder. On June 1, 2012, in the seventh inning, Yadier Molina hit a ball to the warning track, and Baxter, playing left field, made a diving catch, running into the wall to make the play. Baxter's catch was crucial in helping Santana complete the no-hitter, which was the first in Mets history. Mets players and fans were impressed by Baxter's effort, with Josh Thole stating "It saved the no-hitter". Carlos Beltran called it an "unbelievable" play. He was subsequently placed on the team's disabled list on June 3. Despite the recoil, his big play led to Johan Santana's no-hitter, the first no-hitter in Mets' history. Baxter began a rehab assignment with the Single-A St. Lucie Mets on July 15, before being promoted to the Double-A Binghamton Mets and last to the Triple-A Buffalo Bisons. On July 30, Baxter was activated from the 15-day disabled list. On August 4, during a game against the San Diego Padres, Baxter set a New York Mets franchise record by recording five walks in a nine-inning game, tying the record for most walks in a nine-inning game in the National League; this was most recently achieved by Ryan Howard of the Philadelphia Phillies. Baxter also tied a New York Mets franchise record for most walks in a game, regardless of the number of innings played. He tied Vince Coleman, who achieved the feat on August 10, 1992, in a 16-inning game against the Pittsburgh Pirates.

==== 2013 ====
In 2013, Baxter was on the Mets' active roster for opening day for the second consecutive year. Despite being considered a front-runner for a starting outfield spot at the beginning of spring training, the starting job was instead given to Marlon Byrd, again relegating Baxter to a reserve role. In June, Baxter was sent down to the Triple-A Las Vegas 51s. On August 3, the Mets recalled Baxter to replace David Wright who was placed on the 15-day disabled list. Baxter was optioned down on August 24 when Lucas Duda was recalled. He was called back up on September 8.

=== Los Angeles Dodgers ===
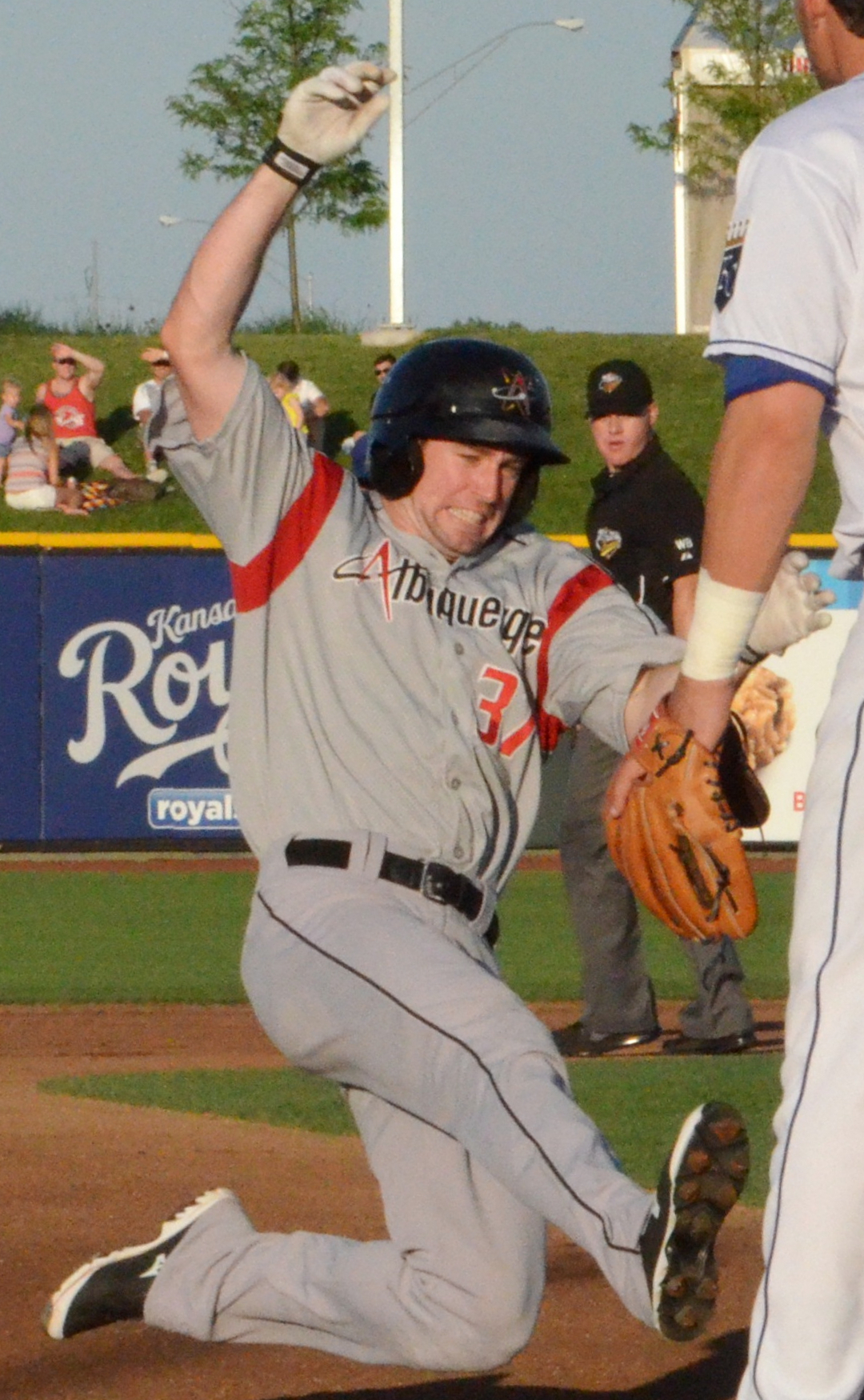
Baxter with the Albuquerque Isotopes in 2014

On October 17, 2013, Baxter was claimed off waivers by the Los Angeles Dodgers. He made the opening day roster and appeared in 4 games and was hitless in 7 at-bats before he was optioned to the minors. He was designated for assignment on April 6, 2014, cleared waivers, and was outrighted to AAA Albuquerque, where he hit .289 in 119 games.

=== Chicago Cubs ===
Baxter signed a minor league contract with the Chicago Cubs in January 2015. He was assigned to the Cubs Triple-A Iowa team to start the season.

Baxter's contract was selected by the Cubs and he was called up on May 19, 2015, as part of a number of roster moves made by the Cubs that day. He was optioned back down to Iowa on June 2 but recalled on June 3. On July 29, 2015, Baxter was designated for assignment by the Chicago Cubs.

=== Seattle Mariners ===
On December 15, 2015, Baxter signed a minor league contract with the Seattle Mariners. He spent the 2016 campaign with the Triple–A Tacoma Rainiers, also appearing in three games for the Low–A Everett AquaSox. In 69 games for Tacoma, Baxter batted .241/.341/.405 with seven home runs, 36 RBI, and eight stolen bases. He elected free agency following the season on November 7, 2016.

== Post-playing career ==
Baxter served as a hitting coach and recruiting coordinator for the Vanderbilt Commodores baseball team at Vanderbilt University from 2018 to 2024.

== Awards and honors ==
- 2008 Arizona Fall League All-Prospect Team
