= Elvin Ramírez =

Dominican baseball player (born 1987)

- Pitcher
- Born: October 10, 1987 (age 38); San Cristóbal, Dominican Republic
- Batted: Right Threw: Right

MLB debut
- June 3, 2012, for the New York Mets

Last appearance
- October 3, 2012, for the New York Mets

MLB statistics
- Win–loss record: 0–1
- Earned run average: 5.48
- Strikeouts: 22
- Stats at Baseball Reference

Teams
- New York Mets (2012)

Elvin Ramírez Rodriguez (born October 10, 1987) is a Dominican former professional baseball pitcher. He played in Major League Baseball (MLB) for the New York Mets.

== Career ==
Ramírez was signed as an international free agent by the New York Mets in 2004. He was selected by the Washington Nationals in the Rule 5 draft before the 2011 season. He was placed on the 60-day disabled list to begin the season. He was returned to the Mets on October 18. The Mets promoted Ramírez to the majors on June 1, 2012. On March 27, 2013, the Mets traded Ramirez to the Angels for cash considerations. He signed a minor league deal with the Pittsburgh Pirates on December 18, 2013. The Pirates released Ramírez in March 2014. He signed a minor league deal with the Cincinnati Reds in April 2014 and was released by the Reds in August 2014.

On June 27, 2017, Ramirez signed with the Bridgeport Bluefish of the Atlantic League of Professional Baseball.

On November 1, 2017, Ramirez was drafted by the Long Island Ducks in the Bridgeport Bluefish dispersal draft. He became a free agent after the 2017 season.

On April 13, 2018, Ramirez was traded to the New Britain Bees of the Atlantic League of Professional Baseball. He became a free agent following the 2018 season.

== See also ==
- Rule 5 draft results
