= Terry Collins =

American baseball manager

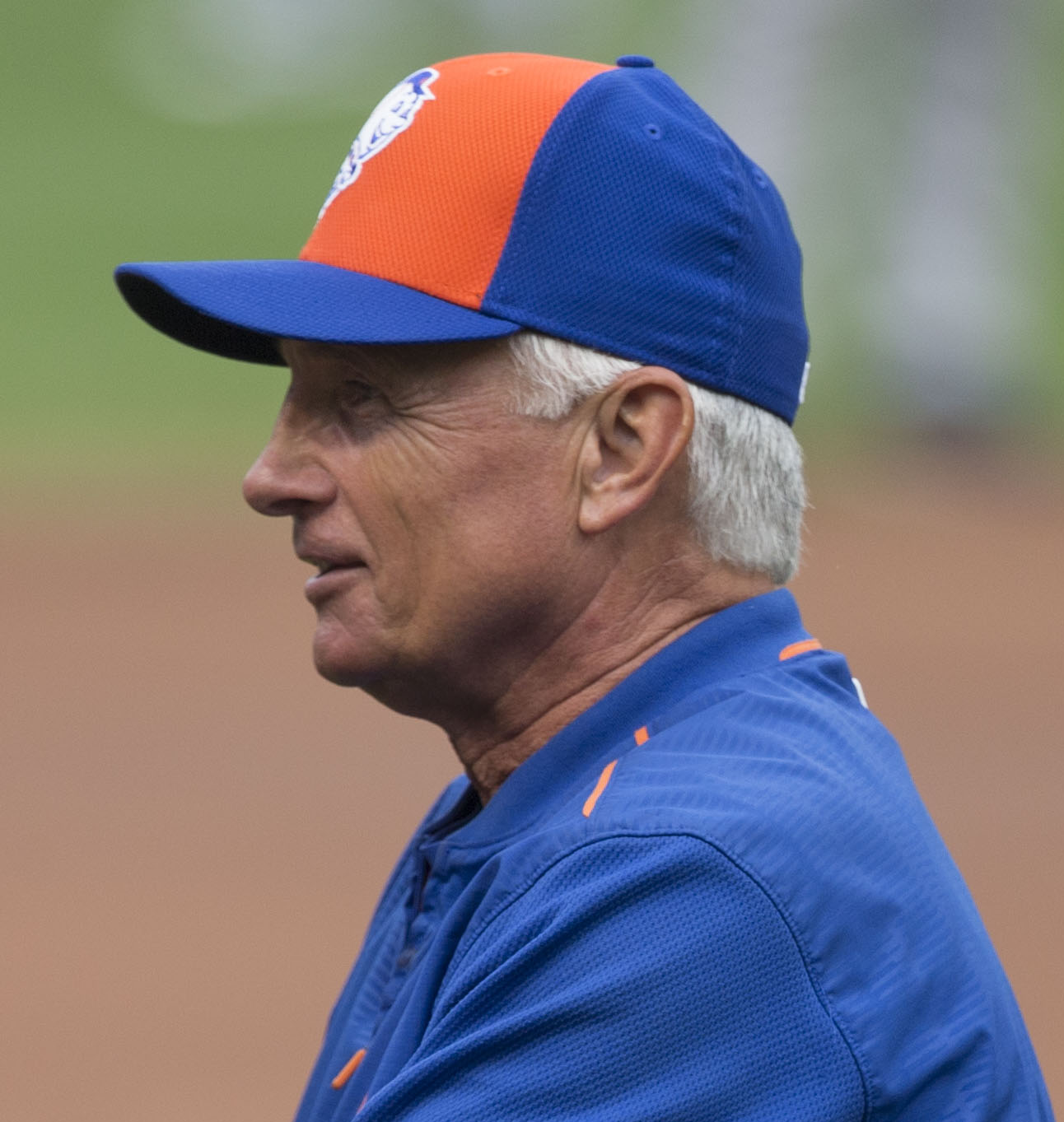
- Collins with the New York Mets in 2015
- Manager / Consultant
- Born: May 27, 1949 (age 77); Midland, Michigan, U.S.
- Bats: Left Throws: Right

MLB statistics
- Managerial record: 995–1017
- Winning %: .495

NPB statistics
- Managerial record: 83–105
- Winning %: .441
- Stats at Baseball Reference
- Managerial record at Baseball Reference

Teams
- As manager: Houston Astros (1994–1996); Anaheim Angels (1997–1999); Orix Buffaloes (2007–2008); New York Mets (2011–2017); As coach: Pittsburgh Pirates (1992–1993); Tampa Bay Devil Rays (2001)

Terry Lee Collins (born May 27, 1949) is an American former professional baseball manager. He managed the Houston Astros, the Anaheim Angels and New York Mets in Major League Baseball (MLB) and the Orix Buffaloes of Nippon Professional Baseball (NPB). He currently serves as a baseball analyst for Mets programming on SNY and as a front office consultant for the Miami Marlins.

A former Minor League Baseball shortstop, Collins managed the Albuquerque Dukes of the Pacific Coast League and the Buffalo Bisons of the International League at the minor league level, and the Duluth Huskies of the Northwoods League at the summer collegiate league level. In 1994, he made his MLB managerial debut with the Houston Astros. He also managed the Anaheim Angels for three years. Known as a "feisty and intense manager", Collins had his longest tenure as manager of the New York Mets (his first major league job in a decade), where he led them to their first playoff appearance in nine years in 2015, which resulted in a trip to the 2015 World Series, their first pennant since 2000.

Since retiring from managing, Collins has worked in the Mets' front office as a special assistant to general managers Sandy Alderson (2018) and Brodie Van Wagenen (2019). He also joined Fox Sports as a studio analyst for the network's MLB coverage in 2019.

== Amateur career ==
Collins attended Midland High School in Midland, Michigan where he played on the school's baseball team with Jim Kern. He graduated in 1967.

Collins attended college at Eastern Michigan University from 1968–1971, where he played shortstop. In each of the four years he attended Eastern Michigan, Collins led the team in steals. He was on the Eastern Michigan team that won the NAIA national championship in 1971, at which he won the honor of Outstanding Defensive Player of the Tournament. Collins was inducted into the Eastern Michigan University Athletic Hall of Fame in 1994.

== Playing career ==
In 1971, Collins was drafted by the Pittsburgh Pirates. During a 10-year playing career, he played from 1970-1978 and in 1980 and 1984 in the Pittsburgh Pirates and Los Angeles Dodgers organizations. However, he never broke into the big leagues. Collins batted left-handed and threw right-handed and stood 5 ft 9 in (1.75 m) tall. He compiled a batting average of .255 in 671 games played.

== Coaching career ==
=== 1981–92 ===
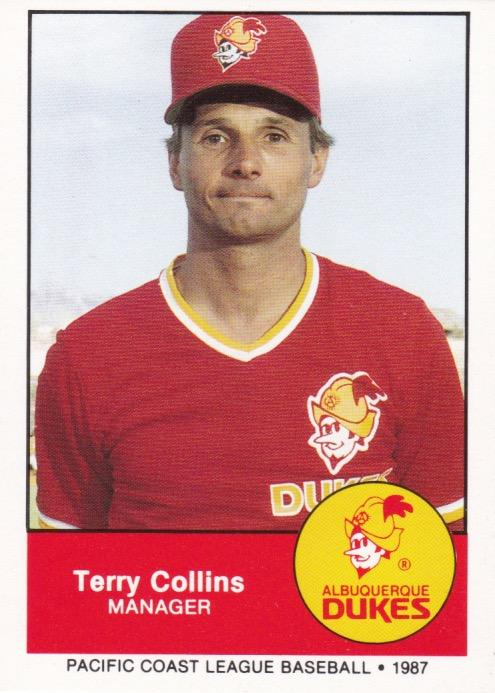
A 1987 baseball card of Collins as manager of the Albuquerque Dukes

In 1981, Collins began his managing career as pilot of the Dodgers' Single-A Lodi affiliate in the California League. In 1983, he managed the Albuquerque Dukes, the Dodgers' Triple–A affiliate also in winter to Mayos de Navojoa in the Mexican Pacific League. He managed the Dukes through the 1987 season, in which he won the PCL championship. He also led the Tigres del Licey to a victory in the 1984 Caribbean Series. He managed three years for the Buffalo Bisons, the Pirates' Triple–A affiliate, winning 246 games in the process. He was promoted to bullpen coach for the Pirates in 1992, where he coached until the end of the 1993 season. In honor of his achievements in Buffalo, he was inducted into the Buffalo Baseball Hall of Fame in 1992. He was also inducted into the Albuquerque Baseball Hall of Fame in 2014.

=== 1994–96: Houston Astros ===
After the 1993 season, the Houston Astros fired manager Art Howe because the owner did not favor Howe's "deliberate style." Astros general manager Bob Watson replaced him with Collins, who never had a losing season in his three years there. The Astros finished second all three years.

The 1994 season seemed to be a highlight year for the Astros and Collins. They were 66-49, with a banner year from first basemen Jeff Bagwell, who was batting .368. They were a half game behind in the National League Central, but the 1994 strike complicated both dilemmas of the team: Bagwell had suffered a season-ending injury to his hand on August 10 but the strike that happened two days later meant that the season would not be concluded. Bagwell was the first MVP in Astros history.

The 1995 season was a 144-game season due to the strike lasting many months. The Astros went 76-68, good for a second-place finish in the Central behind the Cincinnati Reds. That year, Collins was a coach at the All-Star Game. They never were a particular threat to the Reds, but they were in the hunt for the newly instituted Wild Card until the Colorado Rockies (a third year expansion team) swooped in and won the spot by one game.

The Astros had plenty to talk about in 1996. A feud between pitchers and batters boiled over to the public, while owner Drayton McLane pushed for a new ballpark with a second choice being a move to Virginia. On the field, they led for over a hundred days in 1996, leading as late as September 2, but an 8–17 September doomed their chances (including a road trip where they lost all eight games), and they finished in second place by six games behind the St. Louis Cardinals (incidentally, the Astros went 2-11 against the Cardinals that year). They finished with a record of 82-80. He was dismissed at the end of the 1996 season, after the Astros suffered a late-season collapse. During a 1996 game against the Montreal Expos, Collins was hit in the face by a batting helmet thrown by Expos outfielder Moisés Alou during a brawl. Collins had to receive four stitches to close the wound above his lip. He finished his Astros career with a 224–197 record.

Baseball analyst Joe Morgan suggests that Collins was partly to blame for the Astros' failure to make the playoffs. Morgan wrote in 1999:

Adversity is part of baseball; if a manager can't cope with it his team will suffer. Terry Collins, the skipper of the Anaheim Angels learned this lesson when he was with Houston. The Astros were a talented team when Collins was there (1994–96). They finished second three times but failed to make the playoffs because their manager exerted too much pressure on them. He was so uptight, his players thought each pitch was life-or-death. It wasn't anything Terry said; it was his demeanor. Collins was edgy in the dugout during games, always looking like someone who was just waiting for disaster to strike. At the moment anything actually went wrong you could smell the panic in him. Players picked up on that. To alleviate the tension the manager was bringing to the clubhouse, they put added pressure on themselves to perform well, which invariably choked off their natural abilities so that they can't play their best. It's no coincidence that the Astros became a post-season participant once Houston replaced Collins with Larry Dierker. I don't know if Larry knows more about baseball than Collins, but he does have a laid-back attitude that immediately puts his players at ease. Dierker kept the pressure off the team by reminding them that while the goal of winning is serious, the game is still essentially supposed to be fun. (By the way, I have been watching Collins since he joined the Angels and he's a much more laid-back skipper. When I complimented him on this change, he said former Angel infielder-outfielder Tony Phillips had spoken to him about relaxing more and that it has really made an impression.)

Years later, Collins admitted as such that he demanded "probably too much" from his team.

=== 1997–99: Anaheim Angels ===
Less than a month after being dismissed by the Astros, Collins was hired as manager of the Anaheim Angels for the 1997 season. His first two years with the Angels also produced winning records and second-place finishes. In 1999, the Angels sputtered (free agent acquisition Mo Vaughn was hurt less than ten minutes in his first game with Anaheim) and Collins resigned with 29 games left in the season. He apparently received a vote of confidence from the front office, but the players had petitioned GM Bill Bavasi to fire him. He finished his Angels career with a 220–237 record.

=== 2006–2009 ===
At the end of the 2006 season, Collins signed a two-year deal to manage the Orix Buffaloes of the Pacific League in Japan. Terry resigned as manager of the Buffaloes on May 21, 2008, after a 7–3 interleague loss to the Hanshin Tigers. Orix was in 5th place in the PL with a 21–28 record, despite investments in players such as Alex Cabrera in the prior offseason. Injuries to the Buffaloes pitching staff certainly didn't help Collins' situation. However, the Buffaloes bounced back and finished second by the end of the season.

Collins became the manager of the China national baseball team at the end of the year, in time for the 2009 World Baseball Classic.

On July 20, 2009, the Duluth Huskies of the Northwoods League announced that Collins would manage the team for the rest of the season after firing their field manager a few days prior.

=== 2011–2017: New York Mets ===
Collins spent the 2010 season as the minor-league field coordinator for the New York Mets organization. He was introduced as Mets manager on November 23, 2010, signing a two-year deal.

Collins wore number 10 to honor his managing mentor and friend Jim Leyland of the Detroit Tigers. Collins served on Leyland's coaching staff when he was manager of the Pittsburgh Pirates in 1992 and 1993.

On September 27, 2011, the Mets announced they would pick up Collins' option for the 2013 season.

In 2012, after the Mets' 46–40 record at the All-Star break, St. Louis Cardinals manager Tony La Russa selected Collins as one of his coaches to the 2012 All-Star Game in Kansas City. In 2013, San Francisco Giants manager Bruce Bochy selected Collins as one of his coaches at the 2013 All-Star Game which was located at the Mets' ballpark, Citi Field.

At the end of September 2013, Collins agreed to a two-year extension with the Mets with a club option for 2016. When Jim Leyland retired in October 2013, Collins became the oldest active manager in MLB.

On June 16, 2015, Collins won his 340th game as Mets manager, passing Gil Hodges for the third-most in franchise history. On September 26, the Mets defeated the Cincinnati Reds 10–2 to clinch the National League East. It was the first time Collins ever clinched a playoff berth as a manager. On October 15, the Mets defeated the Los Angeles Dodgers to advance to Collins's first-ever National League Championship Series appearance. On October 21, the Mets defeated the Chicago Cubs to advance to the 2015 World Series against the Kansas City Royals. On November 2, Collins made the decision to leave starter Matt Harvey in Game 5 for the ninth inning with the Mets holding a 2–0 lead. Harvey gave up two earned runs in the inning to allow the Royals to tie the game and eventually win the Series, leading to questions about Collins's strategy.

In 2015, Collins won the National League Sporting News Manager of the Year Award.

Collins was the subject of a leaked recording from a May 28, 2016 game against the Los Angeles Dodgers in which he was ejected. The video showcased Collins's heated and profanity-laced argument with MLB umpire Tom Hallion after pitcher Noah Syndergaard was ejected for attempting to throw a beanball at Chase Utley. Utley was involved in a controversial slide on Rubén Tejada during the 2015 National League Division Series, resulting in a broken leg for Tejada. The umpire crew, aware of the history between the two teams, viewed the pitch as retaliation and used that to justify an immediate ejection for Syndergaard, despite not issuing warnings before the game. The recording went viral as it offered an uncensored view into an on-field interaction between an umpire and a manager.

Collins recorded his 468th loss as Mets manager on August 3 at Yankee Stadium, making him the losingest manager in Mets history ahead of Bobby Valentine.

In 2016, despite a record below .500 (60–62) on August 19, the Mets went 27–13 in their final 40 games to make the postseason in consecutive seasons for the second time in franchise history. They subsequently lost to the San Francisco Giants in the Wild Card Game.

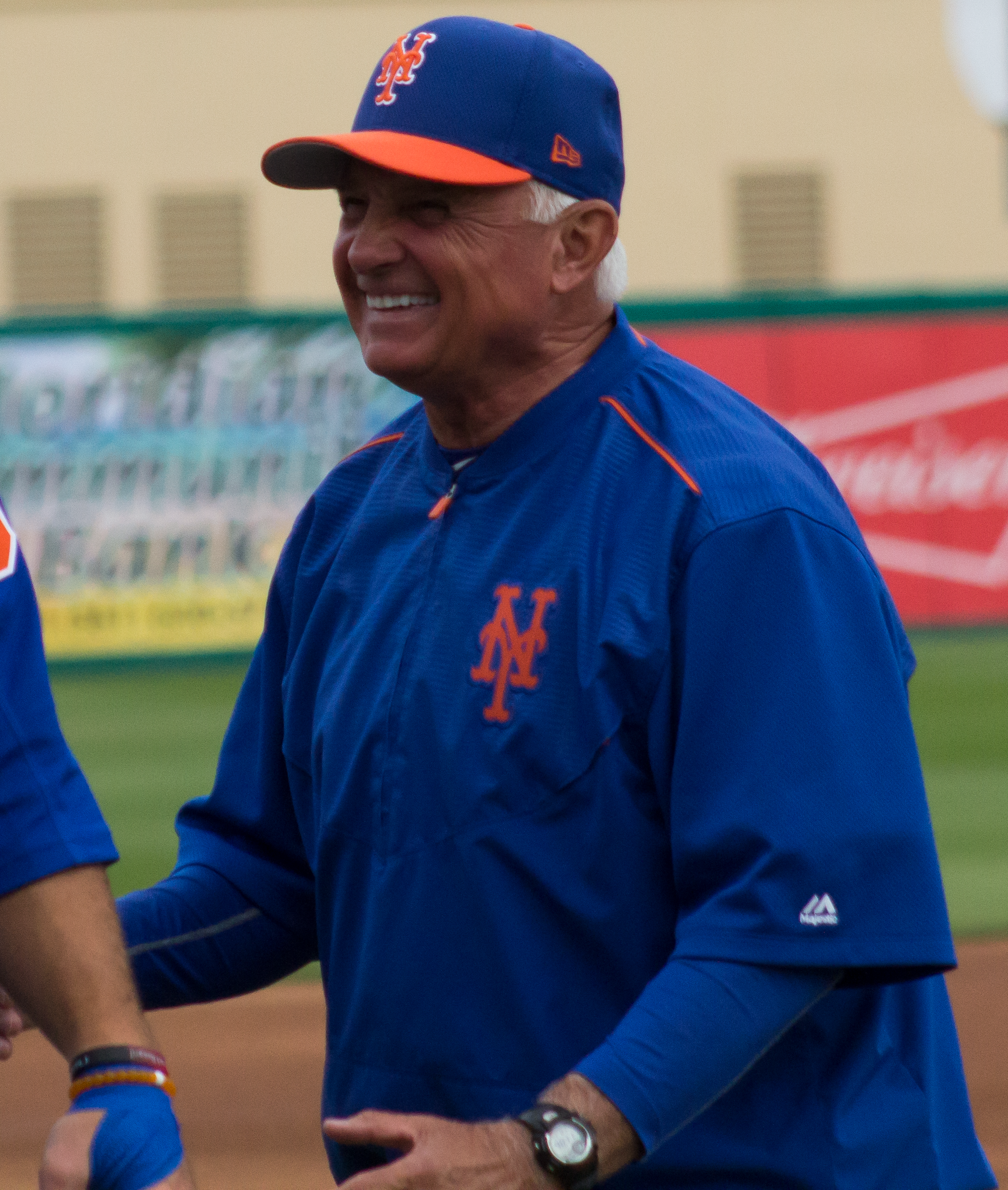
Collins with the Mets in 2017

On May 20, 2017, Collins managed his 1,013th game with the Mets, the most in franchise history. On August 25, he won his 537th game with the Mets, making him the second-winningest manager in franchise history behind only Davey Johnson.

Collins retired as manager following the final game of the 2017 season on October 1, 2017. Immediately upon his retirement from the managerial role, Collins was named as a special assistant to the general manager of the Mets.

=== 2023–present: Miami Marlins ===
On February 16, 2023, the Miami Marlins hired Collins as a baseball consultant.

=== Managerial record ===
As of games played on October 1, 2017.

| Team | Year | Regular season | | | | | Postseason | | | |
| Team | Year | Games | Won | Lost | Win % | Finish | Won | Lost | Win % | Result |
|---|---|---|---|---|---|---|---|---|---|---|
| HOU | 1994 | 115 | 66 | 49 | .574 | 2nd in NL Central | – | – | – | – |
| HOU | 1995 | 144 | 76 | 68 | .528 | 2nd in NL Central | – | – | – | – |
| HOU | 1996 | 162 | 82 | 80 | .506 | 2nd in NL Central | – | – | – | – |
| HOU total | | 421 | 224 | 197 | .532 | | | | | |
| ANA | 1997 | 162 | 84 | 78 | .519 | 2nd in AL West | – | – | – | – |
| ANA | 1998 | 162 | 85 | 77 | .525 | 2nd in AL West | – | – | – | – |
| ANA | 1999 | 133 | 51 | 82 | .383 | (fired) | – | – | – | – |
| ANA total | | 457 | 220 | 237 | .481 | | | | | |
| NYM | 2011 | 162 | 77 | 85 | .475 | 4th in NL East | – | – | – | – |
| NYM | 2012 | 162 | 74 | 88 | .457 | 4th in NL East | – | – | – | – |
| NYM | 2013 | 162 | 74 | 88 | .457 | 3rd in NL East | – | – | – | – |
| NYM | 2014 | 162 | 79 | 83 | .488 | 3rd in NL East | – | – | – | – |
| NYM | 2015 | 162 | 90 | 72 | .556 | 1st in NL East | 8 | 6 | .571 | Lost World Series (KC) |
| NYM | 2016 | 162 | 87 | 75 | .537 | 2nd in NL East | 0 | 1 | .000 | Lost NLWC (SF) |
| NYM | 2017 | 162 | 70 | 92 | .432 | 4th in NL East | – | – | – | – |
| NYM total | | 1,134 | 551 | 583 | .486 | | 8 | 7 | .533 | |
| Total | | 2,012 | 995 | 1,017 | .495 | | 8 | 7 | .533 | |

Sporting positions
| Preceded by Orlando Gomez | Tampa Bay Devil Rays Bullpen Coach; 2001 | Succeeded by Darren Daulton |
| Preceded by Billy Hatcher | Tampa Bay Devil Rays Third Base Coach; 2001 | Succeeded by Tom Foley |
