= Robert Carson (baseball) =

American baseball player (born 1989)

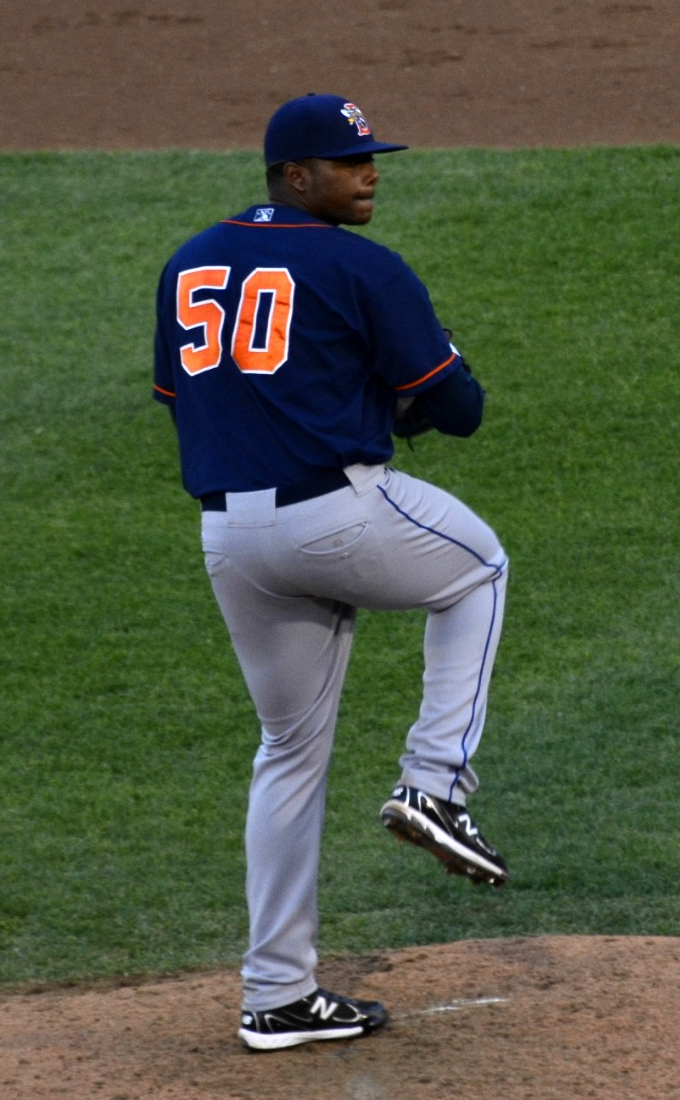
- Carson pitching for the Binghamton Mets in 2011

Mississippi Mud Monsters
- Pitcher / Coach
- Born: January 23, 1989 (age 37); Hattiesburg, Mississippi, U.S.
- Batted: Left Threw: Left

MLB debut
- May 18, 2012, for the New York Mets

Last MLB appearance
- August 28, 2013, for the New York Mets

MLB statistics
- Win–loss record: 0–0
- Earned run average: 6.82
- Strikeouts: 13
- Stats at Baseball Reference

Teams
- New York Mets (2012–2013)

Robert N. Carson III (born January 23, 1989) is an American former professional baseball pitcher who currently serves as the pitching coach for the Mississippi Mud Monsters of the Frontier League. He played in Major League Baseball (MLB) for the New York Mets.

== Playing career ==
=== New York Mets ===
The New York Mets drafted Carson in the 14th round of the 2007 MLB draft out of Hattiesburg High School. He started the 2012 season with the Double–A Binghamton Mets of the Eastern League. The Mets first promoted him to the majors on April 24, but he didn't make an appearance before he was sent back to Binghamton. On May 17, Carson was recalled back to New York, and D. J. Carrasco was designated for assignment. Carson made his major league debut on May 18, 2012, when he pitched a scoreless inning of relief against the Toronto Blue Jays in a 14–5 Mets loss.

Carson started the 2013 season with the Triple-A Las Vegas 51s, and was called up by the Mets on April 21 when Aaron Laffey was designated for assignment. In June 2013, Carson was sent down again to Triple-A Las Vegas. In parts of two seasons with the Mets, he pitched in 31 games with a 6.82 ERA.

=== Los Angeles Angels of Anaheim ===
Carson was claimed off waivers by the Los Angeles Angels of Anaheim on October 17, 2013. He pitched in 14 games for the Triple–A Salt Lake Bees and was 0–1 with a 10.34 ERA. The Angels released him on May 10, 2014.

=== Los Angeles Dodgers ===
Carson signed a minor league deal with the Los Angeles Dodgers on May 17, 2014, and was assigned to the Double–A Chattanooga Lookouts. He had a 2.12 ERA in 11 appearances for the Lookouts and was then promoted to the Triple–A Albuquerque Isotopes, where he was 2–5 with a 5.41 ERA in 18 appearances. He remained with the Dodgers and received a non-roster invite to Major League spring training for 2015. That spring training invitation was rescinded when Carson received a 50-game suspension for violating baseball's drug policy by testing positive for a drug of abuse. He was released by the Dodgers in June.

=== Bridgeport Bluefish ===
Carson signed with the Bridgeport Bluefish on June 16, 2015. He made 23 appearances (12 starts) for the Bluefish, logging a 7-3 record and 2.88 ERA with 80 strikeouts over 78 innings of work. Carson became a free agent after the season.

=== Acereros de Monclova ===
Carson signed with the Acereros de Monclova of the Mexican League for the 2016 season. In seven starts for Monclova, he registered a 3-2 record and 6.28 ERA with 19 strikeouts across 28 2/3 innings pitched. Carson was released by the Acereros on May 9, 2016.

=== Bridgeport Bluefish (second stint) ===
Carson signed with the Bridgeport Bluefish of the Atlantic League of Professional Baseball on May 18, 2016. In three appearances (one start) for the Bluefish, he struggled to an 18.90 ERA with one strikeout across 3 1/3 innings pitched.

=== Southern Maryland Blue Crabs ===
Carson was traded to the Southern Maryland Blue Crabs of the Atlantic League on May 26, 2016. He made 36 appearances (two starts) for the Blue Crabs, logging a 1-5 record and 3.50 ERA with 54 strikeouts across 46 1/3 innings pitched.

Carson made 58 appearances (one start) for Southern Maryland in 2017, posting a 3-4 record and 3.79 ERA with 38 strikeouts over 57 innings of work. He became a free agent after the season.

=== York Revolution ===
On April 4, 2018, Carson signed with the York Revolution of the Atlantic League of Professional Baseball. He became a free agent following the 2018 season, but later re-signed with the Revolution on May 7, 2019. He became a free agent after the 2019 season.

=== Lexington Legends ===
On February 26, 2021, Carson signed with the Lexington Legends of the Atlantic League of Professional Baseball. In 38 appearances for the Legends, he struggled to a 2-4 record and 8.00 ERA with 33 strikeouts over 45 innings of work. Carson became a free agent following the season.

== Coaching career ==
=== Québec Capitales ===
On April 4, 2022, Carson was hired by the Québec Capitales of the Frontier League to serve as the pitching coach. Following the season, Carson was named the Frontier League Coach of the Year, with the Capitales pitching staff having recorded the most games won, fewest runs given up, and the best ERA.

=== Charleston Dirty Birds ===
On December 15, 2023, Carson was announced as the new pitching coach for the Charleston Dirty Birds of the Atlantic League of Professional Baseball.

=== Mississippi Mud Monsters ===
On January 30, 2025, Carson was hired to serve as the pitching coach of the Mississippi Mud Monsters of the Frontier League.
