= 2012 Cincinnati Reds season =

2012 Cincinnati Reds
- National League Central champions
- League: National League
- Division: Central
- Ballpark: Great American Ball Park
- City: Cincinnati, Ohio
- Record: 97–65 (.599)
- Divisional place: 1st
- Owners: Bob Castellini
- General managers: Walt Jocketty
- Managers: Dusty Baker
- Television: Fox Sports Ohio (Thom Brennaman, Chris Welsh, Jim Kelch, George Grande, Jeff Brantley)
- Radio: WLW (700 AM); Reds Radio Network (Marty Brennaman, Jeff Brantley, Jim Kelch, Thom Brennaman)
- Stats: ESPN.com; Baseball Reference

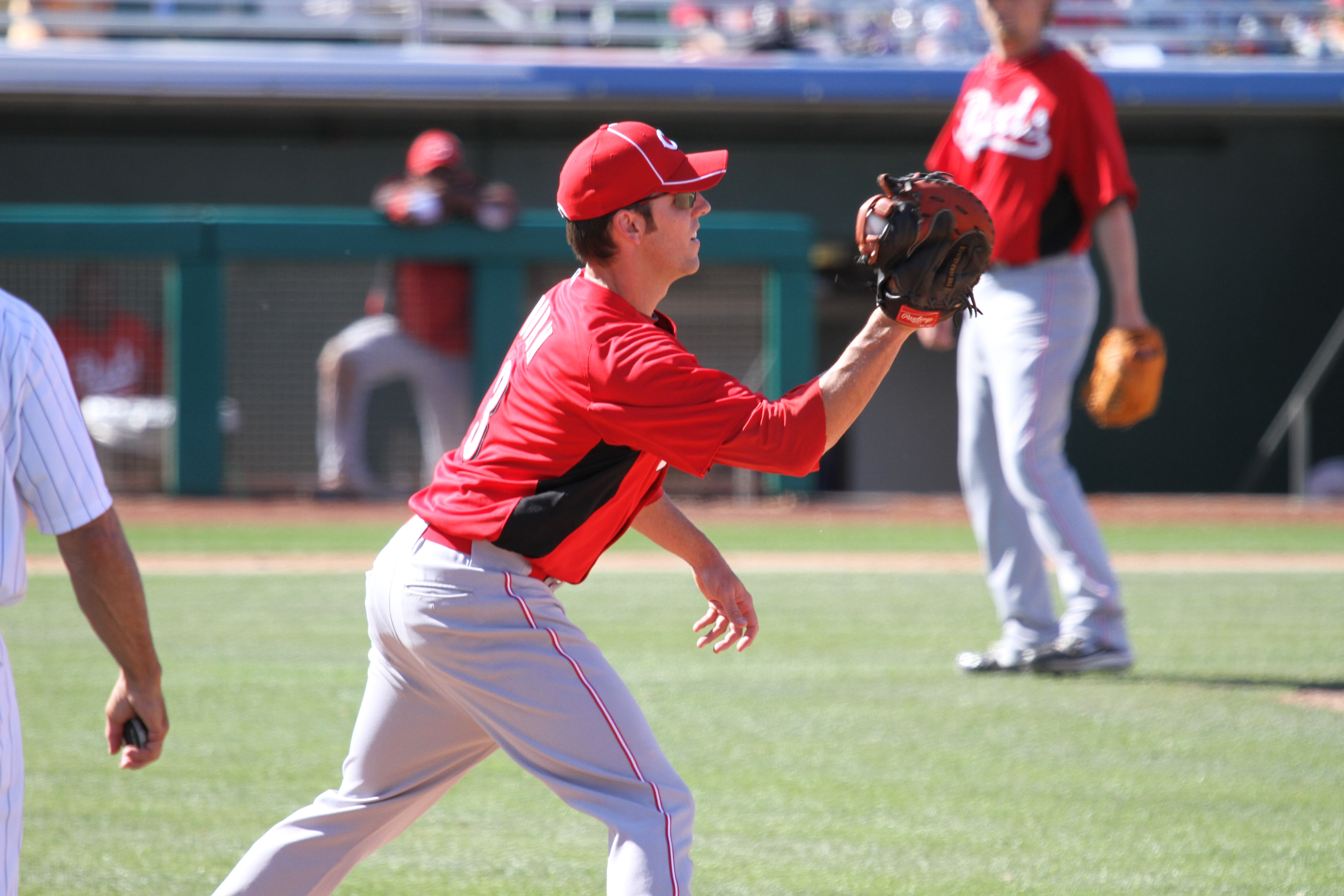
Danny Dorn playing first base for the Cincinnati Reds during 2012 spring training

The 2012 Cincinnati Reds season was the 143rd season for the franchise in Major League Baseball, and their tenth at Great American Ball Park. The Reds improved on their record of 79–83 in 2011 and became the first team to clinch a playoff berth in 2012 by defeating the Cubs 5–3 on September 20. They clinched the National League Central with a 6–0 victory over the Dodgers on September 22. Their final record was 97–65 and they subsequently lost in five games to the San Francisco Giants in the NLDS.

As of 2026, this represents the last playoff game win and division title for the Reds.

== Standings ==
=== NL Central standings ===
NL Central
Team	W	L	Pct.	GB	Home	Road
Cincinnati Reds	97	65	.599	—	50‍–‍31	47‍–‍34
St. Louis Cardinals	88	74	.543	9	50‍–‍31	38‍–‍43
Milwaukee Brewers	83	79	.512	14	49‍–‍32	34‍–‍47
Pittsburgh Pirates	79	83	.488	18	45‍–‍36	34‍–‍47
Chicago Cubs	61	101	.377	36	38‍–‍43	23‍–‍58
Houston Astros	55	107	.340	42	35‍–‍46	20‍–‍61

=== NL Wild Card ===
Division leaders
Team	W	L	Pct.
Washington Nationals	98	64	.605
Cincinnati Reds	97	65	.599
San Francisco Giants	94	68	.580

Wild Card teams (Top 2 teams qualify for postseason)
Team	W	L	Pct.	GB
Atlanta Braves	94	68	.580	+6
St. Louis Cardinals	88	74	.543	—
Los Angeles Dodgers	86	76	.531	2
Milwaukee Brewers	83	79	.512	5
Philadelphia Phillies	81	81	.500	7
Arizona Diamondbacks	81	81	.500	7
Pittsburgh Pirates	79	83	.488	9
San Diego Padres	76	86	.469	12
New York Mets	74	88	.457	14
Miami Marlins	69	93	.426	19
Colorado Rockies	64	98	.395	24
Chicago Cubs	61	101	.377	27
Houston Astros	55	107	.340	33

=== Record vs. opponents ===
2012 National League record Source: MLB Standings Grid – 2012
Team	AZ	ATL	CHC	CIN	COL	MIA	HOU	LAD	MIL	NYM	PHI	PIT	SD	SF	STL	WSH	AL
Arizona	–	2–5	5–4	2–5	9–7	5–3	6–0	12–6	3–3	3–4	2–4	3–4	7–11	9–9	1–5	2–4	9–6
Atlanta	5–2	–	3–4	1–5	6–1	14–4	4–2	3–3	3–3	12–6	12–6	3–4	4–3	3–4	5–1	8–10	8–10
Chicago	4–5	4–3	–	4–12	2–4	8–5	2–4	2–4	4–13	4–2	2–4	8–8	3–3	1–6	7–10	1–6	5–10
Cincinnati	5–2	5–1	12–4	–	5–1	10–5	2–4	3–3	9–6	6–2	3–4	11–7	6–2	4–3	6–7	2–5	7–8
Colorado	7–9	1–6	4–2	1–5	–	5–2	5–2	8–10	5–1	5–2	2–7	2–4	8–10	4–14	2–5	4–3	2–13
Houston	0–6	2–4	5–8	5–10	2–5	–	2–4	2–4	8–9	4–2	3–3	5–12	3–5	1–8	4–11	1–7	6–9
Los Angeles	6–12	3–3	4–2	4–2	10–8	4–2	–	4–2	1–6	4–3	5–2	6–1	11–7	8–10	6–5	4–2	6–9
Miami	3–5	4–14	4–2	3–3	4–3	–	4–2	2–4	4–4	4–12	8–10	1–4	5–1	5–2	2–5	9–9	5–13
Milwaukee	3–3	3–3	13–4	6–9	1–5	9–8	6–1	4–4	–	3–2	2–5	11–4	3–4	2–4	6–9	3–5	6–9
New York	4–3	6–12	2–4	2–6	2–5	2–4	3–4	12–4	2–3	–	10–8	5–2	4–3	4–4	4–3	4–14	8–7
Philadelphia	4–2	6–12	4–2	4–3	7–2	10–8	3–3	2–5	5–2	8–10	–	3–4	4–3	2–4	5–2	9–9	5–10
Pittsburgh	4–3	2–3	8–8	7–11	4–2	4–1	12–5	1–6	4–11	2–5	4–3	–	1–5	3–3	8–7	3–2	10–8
San Diego	11–7	3–4	3–3	2–6	10–8	5–3	7–11	1–5	4–3	3–4	3–4	5–1	–	6–12	3–3	2–3	8–7
San Francisco	9–9	4–3	6–1	3–4	14–4	2–5	8–1	10–8	4–2	4–4	4–2	3–3	12–6	–	3–3	1–5	7–8
St. Louis	5–1	1–5	10–7	7–6	5–2	11–4	5–6	5–2	9–6	3–4	3–4	7–8	3–3	3–3	–	3–4	8–7
Washington	4–2	10–8	6–1	5–2	3–4	7–1	2–4	9–9	5–3	14–4	9–9	2–3	3–2	5–1	4–3	–	10–8

== Regular season highlights ==
Opening Day Starting Lineup

Position	Name
Starting Pitcher	Johnny Cueto
Catcher	Ryan Hanigan
First Baseman	Joey Votto
Second Baseman	Brandon Phillips
Third Baseman	Scott Rolen
Shortstop	Zack Cozart
Left Fielder	Ryan Ludwick
Center Fielder	Drew Stubbs
Right Fielder	Jay Bruce

=== April ===
- April 5: The Reds opened the season with a 4–0 shutout victory over the Miami Marlins in front of 42,956 fans — the largest crowd ever for a regular season game at Great American Ball Park. This was the first Opening Day shutout win for the Reds since 1980.

=== May ===
- May 13: Joey Votto homers three times, including a walk-off grand slam in a 9–6 win over the Washington Nationals on Mother's Day. Votto became the first player in Major League Baseball history to hit three homers and have one of them be a walk-off grand slam in the same game.
- May 21: In a 4–1 victory over the Atlanta Braves, The Reds had 4 solo home runs in one game, including three in a row in the 4th inning by Mike Leake, Zack Cozart and Drew Stubbs. Both Leake and Cozart's home runs were caught by the same fan, Caleb Lloyd. Mike Leake went 8 innings with 6 strikeouts to earn his first victory of 2012.
- May 21–24: The Reds complete a four-game sweep of the Atlanta Braves. The Reds hit 10 home runs during the series. It was the first 4-game sweep of the Braves since 1990. At the end of the series, the Reds ascended into first place by half a game when the Cardinals lost to the Phillies.

=== June ===
- June 12–14: The Reds sweep their in-state rivals, the Cleveland Indians, in three games. During the three wins, the Reds outscored the Indians 24–9 and outhit them 37–26.
- June 15–17: The Reds win three straight games against the New York Mets for their second straight sweep, making 6 straight wins.
- June 18, 19, 20: On June 18, 19, 20 the Indians swept their instate rival Cincinnati Reds in Cleveland scoring 21 runs to the Reds 12, beating LeCure, Chapman and Arroyo.

=== July ===
- July 16: Joey Votto is placed on 15-day DL due to arthroscopic knee surgery.
- July 19–29: The Reds beat Arizona in a dramatic comeback, then sweep Milwaukee at Great American Ball Park, Houston and Colorado on the road to go on a 10-game winning streak. All of these wins came without 2010 MVP and All-Star First Baseman, Joey Votto. As a result of the streak Hall of Fame announcer Marty Brennaman had his head shaved, with proceeds going to Cincinnati area charities.

=== August ===
- August 29: The Reds became the first team in MLB to reach 80 wins with a 6–2 win over the Arizona Diamondbacks. It was also the fastest the Reds have reached 80 wins since their 1976 season.

=== September ===
- September 20: The Reds became the first team in MLB to secure a spot in the playoffs with a 5–3 win over the Chicago Cubs.
- September 22: The Reds became the first division winner, with a 6–0 win over the Los Angeles Dodgers, the win gives the Reds their second NL Central title in three years.
- September 28: Homer Bailey no-hits the Pittsburgh Pirates at PNC Park. Only two men reached base, Barmes on a fielding error by Scott Rolen in the 3rd and a walk by McCutchen in the 7th. It was the 15th no-hitter in the long existence of the Cincinnati Reds. Frazier's sacrifice fly, scoring Phillips in the 1st was the lone run. Bailey struck out 10.

=== Game log ===
Legend
	Reds win
	Reds loss
	Postponement
**Bold**	Reds team member

2012 Game Log
April (11–11)

#	Date	Opponent	TV	Score	Win	Loss	Save	Attendance	Record	Box
1	April 5	Marlins	FSO	**W** 4–0	**Cueto** (1–0)	Buehrle (0–1)		42,956	1–0	
2	April 7	Marlins	FSO	**L** 3–8	Nolasco (1–0)	**Latos** (0–1)		41,662	1–1	
3	April 8	Marlins	FSO	**W** 6–5	**Chapman** (1–0)	Bell (0–1)		23,539	2–1	
4	April 9	Cardinals	FSO	**L** 1–7	Westbrook (1–0)	**Bailey** (0–1)		16,909	2–2	
5	April 10	Cardinals	FSO	**L** 1–3	Lohse (2–0)	**Leake** (0–1)	Motte (2)	17,110	2–3	
6	April 11	Cardinals	MLBN	**W** 4–3	**Chapman** (2–0)	Rzepczynski (0–1)		20,672	3–3	
7	April 12	@ Nationals	FSO	**L** 2–3 (10)	Stammen (1–0)	**Simón** (0–1)		40,907	3–4	
8	April 13	@ Nationals	FSO	**L** 1–2 (13)	Stammen (2–0)	**Marshall** (0–1)		26,959	3–5	
9	April 14	@ Nationals	FSO	**L** 1–4	Jackson (1–0)	**Bailey** (0–2)		35,489	3–6	
10	April 15	@ Nationals	FSO	**W** 8–5 (11)	**Arredondo** (1–0)	Clippard (1–1)	**Marshall** (1)	25,679	4–6	
11	April 17	@ Cardinals	FSO	**L** 1–2 (10)	Motte (1–0)	**LeCure** (0–1)		35,562	4–7	
12	April 18	@ Cardinals	FSO	**L** 1–11	Garcia (2–0)	**Latos** (0–2)		35,907	4–8	
13	April 19	@ Cardinals	FSO	**W** 6–3	**Arroyo** (1–0)	Wainwright (0–3)	**Marshall** (2)	40,049	5–8	
14	April 20	@ Cubs	FSO	**W** 9–4	**Bailey** (1–2)	Volstad (0–2)		37,782	6–8	
15	April 21	@ Cubs	FSO	**L** 1–6	Maholm (1–2)	**Leake** (0–2)		38,405	6–9	
16	April 22	@ Cubs	FSO	**W** 4–3	**Cueto** (2–0)	López (0–1)	**Marshall** (3)	35,801	7–9	
17	April 24	Giants	FSO	**W** 9–2	**Latos** (1–2)	Cain (1–1)		19,051	8–9	
18	April 25	Giants	FSO	**W** 4–2	**Arredondo** (2–0)	Hensley (1–2)	**Marshall** (4)	17,115	9–9	
19	April 26	Giants	FSO	**L** 5–6	López (2–0)	**Marshall** (0–2)	Casilla (2)	17,317	9–10	
20	April 27	Astros	FSO	**L** 4–6	Rodríguez (2–2)	**Leake** (0–3)	Myers (4)	29,486	9–11	
21	April 28	Astros	FSO	**W** 6–0	**Cueto** (3–0)	Harrell (1–2)		32,971	10–11	
22	April 29	Astros	FSO	**W** 6–5	**Ondrusek** (1–0)	Rodriguez (0–3)	**Marshall** (5)	31,086	11–11	

May (17–11)

#	Date	Opponent	TV	Score	Win	Loss	Save	Attendance	Record	Box
–	May 1	Cubs	FSO	Postponed (rain). Makeup Date August 18.						
23	May 2	Cubs	FSO	**L** 1–3	Samardzija (3–1)	**Arroyo** (1–1)	Mármol (2)	16,868	11–12	
24	May 3	Cubs		**W** 4–3 (10)	**Ondrusek** (2–0)	Dolis (1–2)		23,288	12–12	
25	May 4	@ Pirates	FSO	**W** 6–1	**Cueto** (4–0)	Correia (1–2)		20,445	13–12	
26	May 5	@ Pirates	FSO	**L** 2–3	McDonald (2–1)	**Leake** (0–4)	Hanrahan (5)	33,019	13–13	
27	May 6	@ Pirates	FSO	**W** 5–0	**Latos** (2–2)	Morton (1–3)		20,042	14–13	
28	May 7	@ Brewers	FSO	**W** 6–1	**Arroyo** (2–1)	Estrada (0–2)		27,157	15–13	
29	May 8	@ Brewers	FSO	**L** 3–8	Gallardo (2–3)	**Bailey** (1–3)		28,108	15–14	
30	May 9	@ Brewers	FSO	**W** 2–1	**Chapman** (3–0)	Axford (0–2)	**Ondrusek** (1)	27,090	16–14	
31	May 11	Nationals	FSO	**L** 3–7	Gonzalez (4–1)	**Leake** (0–5)		37,255	16–15	
32	May 12	Nationals	FSO	**L** 1–2	Zimmermann (2–3)	**Arredondo** (2–1)	Rodríguez (8)	42,294	16–16	
33	May 13	Nationals	FSO	**W** 9–6	**Marshall** (1–2)	Rodríguez (1–3)		28,361	17–16	
34	May 14	@ Braves	FSO	**W** 3–1	**Ondrusek** (3–0)	Venters (2-2)	**Marshall** (6)	19,697	18–16	
35	May 15	@ Braves	FSO	**L** 2–6	Hudson (2–1)	**Cueto** (4–1)		21,530	18–17	
36	May 16	@ Mets	FSO	**W** 6–3	**Arredondo** (3–1)	Rauch (3–2)	**Marshall** (7)	22,659	19–17	
37	May 17	@ Mets	FSO	**L** 4–9	Parnell (1–0)	**Ondrusek** (3–1)		29,943	19–18	
38	May 18	@ Yankees	FSO	**L** 0–4	Pettitte (1–1)	**Arroyo** (2–2)		42,015	19–19	
39	May 19	@ Yankees	FSO	**W** 6–5	**Bailey** (2–3)	Nova (4–2)	**Arredondo** (1)	45,302	20–19	
40	May 20	@ Yankees	FSO	**W** 5–2	**Cueto** (5–1)	Sabathia (5–2)	**Chapman** (1)	45,622	21–19	
41	May 21	Braves	FSO	**W** 4–1	**Leake** (1–5)	Minor (2–4)	**Marshall** (8)	17,606	22–19	
42	May 22	Braves	FSO	**W** 4–3	**Latos** (3–2)	Beachy (5–2)	**Chapman** (2)	26,438	23–19	
43	May 23	Braves	FSO	**W** 2–1	**Chapman** (4–0)	Martínez (2–1)		20,411	24–19	
44	May 24	Braves	FSO	**W** 6–3	**Bailey** (3–3)	Delgado (2–5)	**Ondrusek** (2)	23,312	25–19	
45	May 25	Rockies	FSO	**L** 3–6	Friedrich (2–1)	**Cueto** (5–2)	Betancourt (8)	29,597	25–20	
46	May 26	Rockies	Fox	**W** 10–3	**Hoover** (1–0)	Guthrie (2–3)		35,314	26–20	
47	May 27	Rockies	FSO	**W** 7–5	**Latos** (4–2)	Moyer (2–5)	**Chapman** (3)	29,368	27–20	
48	May 28	@ Pirates	FSO	**L** 1–4	McDonald (4–2)	**Arroyo** (2–3)	Hanrahan (12)	14,792	27–21	
49	May 29	@ Pirates	FSO	**W** 8–1	**Bailey** (4–3)	Morton (2–6)		12,077	28–21	
50	May 30	@ Pirates	FSO	**L** 1–2	Burnett (4–2)	**Cueto** (5–3)	Hanrahan (13)	16,782	28–22	

June (15–12)

#	Date	Opponent	TV	Score	Win	Loss	Save	Attendance	Record	Box
51	June 1	@ Astros	FSO	**W** 4–1	**Leake** (2–5)	Happ (4–5)	**Chapman** (4)	21,464	29–22	
52	June 2	@ Astros	Fox	**W** 12–9	**LeCure** (1–1)	Rodriguez (1–6)	**Chapman** (5)	22,991	30–22	
53	June 3	@ Astros	FSO	**L** 3–5	Lyles (1–1)	**Arroyo** (2–4)	Myers (13)	19,914	30–23	
54	June 5	Pirates	FSO	**L** 4–8	Burnett (5–2)	**Bailey** (4–4)	Hanrahan (15)	19,906	30–24	
55	June 6	Pirates	FSO	**W** 5–4	**Cueto** (6–3)	Lincoln (3–1)	**Chapman** (6)	16,859	31–24	
56	June 7	Pirates	FSO	**L** 4–5 (10)	Hanrahan (3–0)	**Chapman** (4–1)	Resop (1)	23,106	31–25	
57	June 8	Tigers	FSO	**W** 6–5 (10)	**LeCure** (2–1)	Coke (1–2)		38,653	32–25	
58	June 9	Tigers	FSO	**L** 2–3	Villarreal (2–1)	**Marshall** (1–3)	Valverde (11)	42,443	32–26	
59	June 10	Tigers	ESPN	**L** 6–7	Villarreal (3–1)	**Chapman** (4–2)	Valverde (12)	34,056	32–27	
60	June 12	Indians	FSO	**W** 7–1	**Cueto** (7–3)	Gómez (4–5)		27,758	33–27	
61	June 13	Indians	FSO	**W** 5–3	**Latos** (5–2)	Lowe (7–5)	**Chapman** (7)	27,428	34–27	
62	June 14	Indians	FSO	**W** 12–5	**Arredondo** (4–1)	Tomlin (3–4)		34,193	35–27	
63	June 15	@ Mets	FSO	**W** 7–3	**Arroyo** (3–4)	Gee (4–5)		34,716	36–27	
64	June 16	@ Mets	Fox	**W** 4–1	**Bailey** (5–4)	Niese (4–3)	**Chapman** (8)	27,988	37–27	
65	June 17	@ Mets	FSO	**W** 3–1	**Cueto** (8–3)	Young (1–1)	**Marshall** (9)	40,134	38–27	
66	June 18	@ Indians	FSO	**L** 9–10	Smith (5–1)	**LeCure** (2–2)	Perez (22)	19,948	38–28	
67	June 19	@ Indians	FSO	**L** 2–3 (10)	Hagadone (1–0)	**Chapman** (4–3)		17,213	38–29	
68	June 20	@ Indians	FSO	**L** 1–8	Masterson (4–6)	**Arroyo** (3–5)		23,544	38–30	
69	June 22	Twins	FSO	**L** 4–5	Blackburn (4–4)	**Bailey** (5–5)	Perkins (2)	33,531	38–31	
70	June 23	Twins	FSO	**W** 6–0	**Cueto** (9–3)	Duensing (1–3)		41,750	39–31	
71	June 24	Twins	FSO	**L** 3–4	Diamond (6–3)	**Chapman** (4–4)	Burton (1)	34,513	39–32	
72	June 25	Brewers	FSO	**W** 3–1	**Latos** (6–2)	Gallardo (6–6)		34,485	40–32	
73	June 26	Brewers	FSO	**W** 4–3	**Marshall** (2–3)	Axford (1–5)	**Chapman** (9)	32,986	41–32	
74	June 27	Brewers	FSO	**L** 4–8	Greinke (9–2)	**Bailey** (5–6)		28,906	41–33	
75	June 28	@ Giants	FSO	**L** 0–5	Bumgarner (10–4)	**Cueto** (9–4)		41,626	41–34	
76	June 29	@ Giants	FSO	**W** 5–1	**Leake** (3–5)	Cain (9–3)		41,960	42–34	
77	June 30	@ Giants	FSO	**W** 2–1	**Latos** (7–2)	Zito (6–6)		42,135	43–34	

July (19–7)

#	Date	Opponent	TV	Score	Win	Loss	Save	Attendance	Record	Box
78	July 1	@ Giants	FSO	**L** 3–4	Casilla (2–3)	**Arredondo** (4–2)		42,039	43–35	
79	July 2	@ Dodgers	FSO	**W** 8–2	**Bailey** (6–6)	Billingsley (4–8)		34,493	44–35	
80	July 3	@ Dodgers	FSO	**L** 1–3	Elbert (1–1)	**Cueto** (9–5)	Jansen (13)	33,884	44–36	
81	July 4	@ Dodgers	FSO	**L** 1–4	Harang (6–5)	**Leake** (3–6)	Jansen (14)	53,570	44–37	
82	July 5	@ Padres	FSO	**L** 1–2	Street (2–0)	**Ondrusek** (3–2)		25,181	44–38	
83	July 6	@ Padres	FSO	**W** 6–0	**Arroyo** (4–5)	Wells (1–2)		26,016	45–38	
84	July 7	@ Padres	FSO	**W** 6–5	**Bailey** (7–6)	Richard (6–9)	**Chapman** (10)	34,222	46–38	
85	July 8	@ Padres	FSO	**W** 4–2	**Cueto** (10–5)	Marquis (3–9)	**Chapman** (11)	24,032	47–38	
**July 10: 2012 MLB All-Star Game – Kansas City, Missouri at Kauffman Stadium**
86	July 13	Cardinals	FSO	**W** 5–3	**Simón** (1–1)	Wainwright (7–9)	**Chapman** (12)	40,217	48–38	
87	July 14	Cardinals	Fox	**W** 3–2 (10)	**LeCure** (3–2)	Marte (2–2)		37,583	49–38	
88	July 15	Cardinals	ESPN	**W** 4–2	**Bailey** (8–6)	Westbrook (7–8)	**Chapman** (13)	39,280	50–38	
89	July 16	Diamondbacks	FSO	**L** 3–5	Miley (10–5)	**Arroyo** (4–6)	Putz (17)	27,735	50–39	
90	July 17	Diamondbacks	FSO	**W** 4–0	**Cueto** (11–5)	Bauer (1–2)	**Chapman** (14)	19,142	51–39	
91	July 18	Diamondbacks	FSO	**L** 1–7	Kennedy (7–8)	**Latos** (7–3)		26,077	51–40	
92	July 19	Diamondbacks		**W** 7–6	**Simón** (2–1)	Shaw (1–4)	**Chapman** (15)	21,620	52–40	
93	July 20	Brewers	FSO	**W** 3–1	**Bailey** (9–6)	Estrada (0–4)	**Chapman** (16)	30,247	53–40	
94	July 21	Brewers	FSO	**W** 6–2	**Arroyo** (5–6)	Gallardo (8–7)		40,090	54–40	
95	July 22	Brewers	FSO	**W** 2–1	**Cueto** (12–5)	Fiers (3–4)	**Chapman** (17)	32,884	55–40	
96	July 23	@ Astros	FSO	**W** 8–3	**Latos** (8–3)	Rodríguez (7–9)		15,538	56–40	
97	July 24	@ Astros	FSO	**W** 4–2	**Leake** (4–6)	Cordero (3–6)	**Chapman** (18)	15,908	57–40	
98	July 25	@ Astros	FSO	**W** 5–3	**Marshall** (3–3)	Cordero (3–7)	**Chapman** (19)	16,077	58–40	
99	July 27	@ Rockies	FSO	**W** 3–0	**Arroyo** (6–6)	Pomeranz (1–6)	**Chapman** (20)	38,214	59–40	
100	July 28	@ Rockies	FSO	**W** 9–7	**Cueto** (13–5)	Friedrich (5–8)	**Chapman** (21)	42,826	60–40	
101	July 29	@ Rockies	FSO	**W** 7–2	**Latos** (9–3)	Sánchez (1–8)		29,340	61–40	
102	July 30	Padres	FSO	**L** 5–11	Vólquez (7–7)	**Leake** (4–7)		28,140	61–41	
103	July 31	Padres	FSO	**W** 7–6	**Marshall** (4–3)	Marquis (6–10)	**Chapman** (22)	20,356	62–41	

August (19–11)

#	Date	Opponent	TV	Score	Win	Loss	Save	Attendance	Record	Box
104	August 1	Padres	FSO	**W** 6–4	**Arroyo** (7–6)	Wells (2–4)	**Chapman** (23)	20,527	63–41	
105	August 2	Padres		**W** 9–4	**Cueto** (14–5)	Ohlendorf (3–2)		22,396	64–41	
106	August 3	Pirates	FSO	**W** 3–0	**Latos** (10–3)	Rodríguez (7–10)	**Chapman** (24)	40,829	65–41	
107	August 4	Pirates	FSO	**W** 5–4	**Broxton** (2–2)	Hughes (2–1)	**Chapman** (25)	41,577	66–41	
108	August 5	Pirates	FSO	**L** 2–6	Burnett (14–3)	**Bailey** (9–7)	Hanrahan (32)	38,624	66–42	
109	August 6	@ Brewers	FSO	**L** 3–6	Gallardo (10–8)	**Arroyo** (7–7)	Axford (18)	31,319	66–43	
110	August 7	@ Brewers	FSO	**L** 1–3	Fiers (6–4)	**Cueto** (14–6)	Henderson (1)	41,213	66–44	
111	August 8	@ Brewers	FSO	**L** 2–3	Axford (4–6)	**Broxton** (2–3)	Henderson (2)	33,788	66–45	
112	August 9	@ Cubs	FSO	**L** 3–5	Camp (3–5)	**Marshall** (4–4)	Mármol (14)	33,397	66–46	
113	August 10	@ Cubs		**W** 10–8	**Bailey** (10–7)	Germano (1–2)	**Chapman** (26)	36,891	67–46	
114	August 11	@ Cubs	FSO	**W** 4–2	**Arroyo** (8–7)	Russell (5–1)	**Chapman** (27)	40,602	68–46	
115	August 12	@ Cubs	FSO	**W** 3–0	**Cueto** (15–6)	Raley (0–2)	**Chapman** (28)	35,461	69–46	
116	August 14	Mets	FSO	**W** 3–0	**Arredondo** (5–2)	Acosta (1–3)		26,113	70–46	
117	August 15	Mets	FSO	**W** 6–1	**Leake** (5–7)	Dickey (15–4)		26,082	71–46	
118	August 16	Mets	FSO	**L** 4–8	Harvey (2–3)	**Bailey** (10–8)	Rauch (3)	23,137	71–47	
119	August 17	Cubs	FSO	**W** 7–3	**Arroyo** (9–7)	Wood (4–9)		35,332	72–47	
120	August 18	Cubs	FSO	**W** 5–3	**Cueto** (16–6)	Samardzija (8–11)	**Chapman** (29)	28,754	73–47	
121	August 18	Cubs	FSO	**L** 7–9	Raley (1–2)	**Redmond** (0–1)	Mármol (15)	41,236	73–48	
122	August 19	Cubs	FSO	**W** 5–4	**Chapman** (5–4)	Camp (3–6)		41,615	74–48	
123	August 20	@ Phillies	FSO	**L** 5–12	Halladay (7–7)	**Leake** (5–8)		44,341	74–49	
124	August 21	@ Phillies	FSO	**W** 5–4	**Broxton** (3–3)	Papelbon (3–5)	**Chapman** (30)	45,091	75–49	
125	August 22	@ Phillies	FSO	**W** 3–2	**Arroyo** (10–7)	Worley (6–9)	**Chapman** (31)	41,794	76–49	
126	August 23	@ Phillies	FSO	**L** 3–4 (11)	Valdés (3–2)	**Simón** (2–2)		41,972	76–50	
127	August 24	Cardinals	FSO	**L** 5–8	Kelly (4–5)	**Latos** (10–4)	Motte (30)	36,162	76–51	
128	August 25	Cardinals	Fox	**W** 8–2	**Leake** (6–8)	García (3–5)		41,680	77–51	
129	August 26	Cardinals	FSO	**L** 2–8	Wainwright (13–10)	**Bailey** (10–9)		31,564	77–52	
130	August 27	@ Diamondbacks	FSO	**W** 4–3	**Arroyo** (11–7)	Skaggs (1–1)	**Chapman** (32)	17,966	78–52	
131	August 28	@ Diamondbacks	FSO	**W** 5–2	**Cueto** (17–6)	Miley (14–9)	**Chapman** (33)	20,550	79–52	
132	August 29	@ Diamondbacks		**W** 6–2	**Latos** (11–4)	Corbin (14–9)		18,451	80–52	
133	August 31	@ Astros	FSO	**W** 9–3	**Leake** (7–8)	Abad (0–2)		15,287	81–52	

September (15–11)

#	Date	Opponent	TV	Score	Win	Loss	Save	Attendance	Record	Box
134	September 1	@ Astros	FSO	**L** 1–2	López (6–3)	**Marshall** (4–5)		18,316	81–53	
135	September 2	@ Astros	FSO	**W** 5–3	**Arredondo** (6–2)	Cedeño (0–1)	**Chapman** (34)	17,291	82–53	
136	September 3	Phillies	FSO	**L** 2–4	Cloyd (1–1)	**Cueto** (17–7)	Aumont (1)	22,487	82–54	
137	September 4	Phillies	FSO	**W** 2–1	**Latos** (12–4)	Kendrick (8–10)	**Chapman** (35)	17,806	83–54	
138	September 5	Phillies	FSO	**L** 2–6	Halladay (9–7)	**Leake** (7–9)		19,267	83–55	
139	September 7	Astros	FSO	**L** 3–5	Ambriz (1–0)	**Chapman** (5–5)	López (3)	23,785	83–56	
140	September 8	Astros	FSO	**W** 5–1	**Arroyo** (12–7)	Norris (5–12)		35,018	84–56	
141	September 9	Astros	FSO	**L** 1–5	González (2–0)	**Cueto** (17–8)		33,438	84–57	
142	September 10	Pirates	FSO	**W** 4–3 (14)	**Simón** (3–2)	VandenHurk (0–1)		16,577	85–57	
143	September 11	Pirates	FSO	**W** 5–3	**Leake** (8–9)	Correia (10–9)	**Broxton** (24)	19,620	86–57	
144	September 12	Pirates	FSO	**W** 2–1	**Bailey** (11–9)	Burnett (15–7)	**Hoover** (1)	21,203	87–57	
145	September 14	@ Marlins	FSO	**L** 0–4	Turner (2–3)	**Arroyo** (12–8)		27,111	87–58	
146	September 15	@ Marlins	FSO	**L** 4–6	Buehrle (13–12)	**Cueto** (17–9)	Cishek (14)	27,502	87–59	
147	September 16	@ Marlins	FSO	**W** 5–4 (11)	**Ondrusek** (4–2)	Zambrano (7–10)	**Broxton** (25)	24,983	88–59	
148	September 18	@ Cubs	FSO	**W** 3–1	**Bailey** (12–9)	Germano (2–8)	**Broxton** (26)	32,547	89–59	
149	September 19	@ Cubs	FSO	**W** 6–5 (11)	**Ondrusek** (5–2)	Cabrera (7–10)	**Broxton** (27)	31,001	90–59	
150	September 20	@ Cubs	FSO	**W** 5–3	**Cueto** (18–9)	Corpas (0–2)	**Simón** (1)	25,891	91–59	
151	September 21	Dodgers	FSO	**L** 1–3 (10)	Belisario (8–1)	**LeCure** (3–3)	League (13)	35,397	91–60	
152	September 22	Dodgers	Fox	**W** 6–0	**Latos** (13–4)	Fife (0–2)		41,117	92–60	
153	September 23	Dodgers	ESPN	**L** 3–5	Tolleson (3–1)	**Bailey** (12–10)	League (14)	32,932	92–61	
154	September 25	Brewers	FSO	**W** 4–2	**Cueto** (19–9)	Fiers (9–9)	**Chapman** (36)	18,155	93–61	
155	September 26	Brewers	FSO	**L** 1–8	Marcum (6–4)	**Arroyo** (12–9)		20,570	93–62	
156	September 27	Brewers	FSO	**W** 2–1	**Broxton** (4–3)	Axford (5–8)		23,411	94–62	
157	September 28	@ Pirates	FSO	**W** 1–0	**Bailey** (13–10)	Burnett (16–9)		34,796	95–62	
158	September 29	@ Pirates	FSO	**L** 1–2	Hanrahan (5–1)	**Broxton** (4–4)		38,623	95–63	
159	September 30	@ Pirates	FSO	**W** 4–3	**Marshall** (5–5)	Hanrahan (5–2)	**Chapman** (37)	32,814	96–63	

October (1–2)

#	Date	Opponent	TV	Score	Win	Loss	Save	Attendance	Record	Box
160	October 1	@ Cardinals	FSO	**L** 2–4	García (7–7)	**Arroyo** (12–10)	Motte (41)	38,480	96–64	
161	October 2	@ Cardinals	FSO	**W** 3–1	**Latos** (14–4)	Carpenter (0–2)	**Chapman** (38)	39,644	97–64	
162	October 3	@ Cardinals	FSO	**L** 0–1	Marté (3–2)	**Broxton** (4–5)	Motte (42)	42,509	97–65	

== Postseason ==
=== Game log ===
Legend
Reds Win	Reds Loss	Game postponed

2012 Postseason Game Log
National League Division Series: vs. San Francisco Giants (SF wins 3–2)

#	Date	Opponent (TV)	Score	Win	Loss	Save	Attendance	Series
1	October 6	@ Giants (TBS)	W 5–2	LeCure (1–0)	Cain (0–1)		43,492	CIN 1–0
2	October 7	@ Giants (TBS)	W 9–0	Arroyo (1–0)	Bumgarner (0–1)		43,505	CIN 2–0
3	October 9	Giants (TBS)	L 1–2	Romo (1–0)	Broxton (0–1)		44,501	CIN 2–1
4	October 10	Giants (TBS)	L 3–8	Lincecum (1–0)	Leake (0–1)		44,375	Tied 2–2
5	October 11	Giants (TBS)	L 4–6	Cain (1–1)	Latos (0–1)	Romo (1)	44,142	SF 3–2

=== Series Notes ===
==== National League Division Series: vs. San Francisco Giants ====
===== Game 1 =====
Saturday, October 6, 2012 – 9:37 pm (ET) at AT&T Park in San Francisco, California

Team	1	2	3	4	5	6	7	8	9	R	H	E
Cincinnati	0	0	2	1	0	0	0	0	2	5	9	1
San Francisco	0	0	0	0	0	1	0	0	1	2	7	0
WP: LeCure (1-0) LP: Cain (0-1) Sv: None; Home runs: CIN: Brandon Phillips (1), Jay Bruce (1); SF: Buster Posey (1)

===== Game 2 =====
Sunday, October 7, 2012 – 9:37 pm (ET) at AT&T Park in San Francisco, California

Team	1	2	3	4	5	6	7	8	9	R	H	E
Cincinnati	0	1	0	3	0	0	0	5	0	9	13	0
San Francisco	0	0	0	0	0	0	0	0	0	0	2	0
WP: Arroyo (1-0) LP: Bumgarner (0-1) Sv: None; Home runs: CIN: Ryan Ludwick (1); SF: None

===== Game 3 =====
Tuesday, October 9, 2012 – 5:37 pm (ET) at Great American Ball Park in Cincinnati

Team	1	2	3	4	5	6	7	8	9	10	R	H	E
San Francisco	0	0	1	0	0	0	0	0	0	1	2	3	0
Cincinnati	1	0	0	0	0	0	0	0	0	0	1	4	1
WP: Romo (1-0) LP: Broxton (0-1) Sv: None; Home runs: SF: None; CIN: None

===== Game 4 =====
Wednesday, October 10, 2012 – 4:07 pm (ET) at Great American Ball Park in Cincinnati

Team	1	2	3	4	5	6	7	8	9	R	H	E
San Francisco	1	2	0	0	2	0	3	0	0	8	11	1
Cincinnati	1	0	1	0	0	1	0	0	0	3	9	0
WP: Lincecum (1-0) LP: Leake Sv: None; Home runs: SF: Ángel Pagán (1), Gregor Blanco (1), Pablo Sandoval (1); CIN: Ryan Ludwick (2)

===== Game 5 =====
Thursday, October 11, 2012 – 1:07 pm (ET) at Great American Ball Park in Cincinnati

Team	1	2	3	4	5	6	7	8	9	R	H	E
San Francisco	0	0	0	0	0	6	0	0	0	6	9	1
Cincinnati	0	0	0	0	0	2	1	0	1	4	12	1
WP: Cain (1-1) LP: Latos (0-1) Sv: Romo (1); Home runs: SF: Buster Posey (2); CIN: Ryan Ludwick (3)

== Roster ==
2012 Cincinnati Reds
Roster
Pitchers: 33 José Arredondo; 61 Bronson Arroyo; 34 Homer Bailey; 45 Bill Bray; 50 Jonathan Broxton; 54 Aroldis Chapman; 52 Tony Cingrani; 47 Johnny Cueto; 60 J. J. Hoover; 55 Mat Latos; 44 Mike Leake; 63 Sam LeCure; 51 Sean Marshall; 66 Logan Ondrusek; 58 Todd Redmond; 31 Alfredo Simón; 65 Pedro Villarreal	Catchers: 29 Ryan Hanigan; 39 Devin Mesoraco; 30 Dioner Navarro; Infielders: 43 Miguel Cairo; 25 Mike Costanzo; 2 Zack Cozart; 21 Todd Frazier; 68,25 Didi Gregorius; 4 Brandon Phillips; 67,36 Henry Rodríguez; 27 Scott Rolen; 15 Wilson Valdez; 19 Joey Votto	Outfielders: 32 Jay Bruce; 9 Willie Harris; 28 Chris Heisey; 48 Ryan Ludwick; 17 Kristopher Negron; 26 Xavier Paul; 23 Denis Phipps; 6 Drew Stubbs	Manager: 12 Dusty Baker; Coaches: 41 Mark Berry (third base); 22 Billy Hatcher (first base); 49 Brook Jacoby (hitting); 57 Mack Jenkins (assistant pitching); 59 Juan López (bullpen); 38 Bryan Price (pitching); 35 Chris Speier (bench); 72 Mike Stefanski (bullpen catcher)

== Player statistics ==
Up to date as of October 3, 2012.

Note: Team leaders in each category are noted in bold.

Note: * = League leader in category.

=== Batting ===
Note: G = Games played; AB = At bats; R = Runs scored; H = Hits; 2B = Doubles; 3B = Triples; HR = Home runs; RBI = Runs batted in; BB = Bases on balls; SB = Stolen bases; AVG = Batting average

Player	G	AB	R	H	2B	3B	HR	RBI	BB	SB	AVG
Bronson Arroyo	30	63	4	9	1	0	1	3	1	0	.143
Homer Bailey	33	70	1	8	1	0	0	5	1	0	.114
Jay Bruce	**155**	560	**89**	141	35	5	**34**	**99**	62	9	.252
Miguel Cairo	70	150	9	28	7	2	1	13	4	4	.187
Tony Cingrani	3	1	0	0	0	0	0	0	0	0	.000
Mike Costanzo	17	18	0	1	0	0	0	2	1	0	.056
Zack Cozart	138	561	72	138	33	4	15	35	31	4	.246
Johnny Cueto	32	67	3	6	1	0	0	2	0	0	.090
Todd Frazier	128	422	55	115	26	**6**	19	67	36	3	.273
Didi Gregorius	8	20	1	6	0	0	0	2	0	0	.300
Ryan Hanigan	112	317	25	87	14	0	2	24	44	0	.274
Willie Harris	25	44	5	5	4	0	0	2	3	1	.114
Chris Heisey	120	347	44	92	16	5	7	31	18	6	.265
Mat Latos	32	65	2	12	1	0	1	4	3	0	.185
Mike Leake	34	61	8	18	3	0	2	3	1	0	.295
Sam LeCure	47	1	0	0	0	0	0	0	0	0	.000
Ryan Ludwick	125	422	53	116	28	1	26	80	42	0	.275
Devin Mesoraco	54	165	17	35	8	0	5	14	17	1	.212
Dioner Navarro	24	69	6	20	3	1	2	12	2	0	.290
Kris Negron	4	4	2	1	0	0	0	0	1	0	.250
Xavier Paul	55	86	8	27	5	1	2	7	9	4	.314
Brandon Phillips	147	**580**	86	**163**	30	1	18	77	28	15	**.281**
Denis Phipps	8	10	4	3	1	0	1	2	1	0	.300
Todd Redmond	1	1	0	0	0	0	0	0	0	0	.000
Henry Rodriguez	12	14	0	3	1	0	0	2	2	0	.214
Scott Rolen	92	294	26	72	17	2	8	39	30	2	.245
Alfredo Simón	35	4	0	0	0	0	0	0	0	0	.000
Drew Stubbs	136	493	75	105	13	2	14	40	42	**30**	.213
Wilson Valdez	77	194	15	40	4	0	0	15	8	3	.206
Joey Votto	111	374	59	126	**44**	0	14	56	**94***	5	.337
**Team totals**	**162**	**5477**	**669**	**1377**	**296**	**30**	**172**	**636**	**481**	**87**	**.251**

Full batting stats can be found here:

- 2012 Cincinnati Reds Batting Stats at Baseball Reference

=== Pitching ===
Note: G = Games pitched; GS = Games started; IP = Innings pitched; H = Hits allowed; R = Runs allowed; ER = Earned runs allowed; BB = Walks allowed; W = Wins; L = Losses; SV = Saves; HLD = Holds; ERA = Earned run average; SO = Strikeouts; WHIP = Walks and hits per inning pitched

Player	G	GS	IP	H	R	ER	BB	W	L	SV	HLD	ERA	SO	WHIP
José Arredondo	66	0	61.0	50	26	20	34	6	2	1	12	2.95	62	1.38
Bronson Arroyo	32	32	202.0	**209**	86	84	35	12	**10**	0	0	3.74	129	1.21
Homer Bailey	33	**33***	208.0	206	**97**	85	52	13	**10**	0	0	3.68	168	1.24
Bill Bray	14	0	8.2	6	5	5	14	0	0	0	1	5.19	7	2.31
Jonathan Broxton	25	0	22.1	20	7	7	3	3	3	4	10	2.82	20	1.03
Aroldis Chapman	68	0	71.2	35	13	12	23	5	5	**38**	6	1.51	122	0.81
Tony Cingrani	3	0	5.0	4	1	1	2	0	0	0	0	1.80	9	1.20
Johnny Cueto	33	**33***	**217.0**	205	73	67	49	**19**	9	0	0	**2.78**	170	1.17
JJ Hoover	28	0	30.2	17	7	7	13	1	0	1	1	2.05	31	0.98
Mat Latos	33	**33***	209.1	179	87	81	**64**	14	4	0	0	3.48	**185**	**1.16**
Sam LeCure	48	0	57.1	46	22	20	23	3	3	0	7	3.14	61	1.20
Mike Leake	30	30	179.0	201	**97**	**91**	41	8	9	0	0	4.58	116	1.35
Sean Marshall	**73**	0	61.0	55	18	17	16	5	5	9	**22**	2.51	74	1.16
Logan Ondrusek	63	0	54.2	51	23	21	31	5	2	2	13	3.46	39	1.50
Todd Redmond	1	1	3.1	7	4	4	5	0	1	0	0	10.80	2	3.60
Alfredo Simón	36	0	61.0	65	22	18	22	3	2	1	1	2.66	52	1.43
Pedro Villarreal	1	0	1.0	0	0	0	0	0	0	0	0	0.00	1	0.00
**Team totals**	**162**	**162**	**1453.0**	**1356**	**588**	**540**	**427**	**97**	**65**	**56**	**73**	**3.34**	**1248**	**1.23**

Full pitching stats can be found here:

- 2012 Cincinnati Reds Pitching Stats at Baseball Reference

== Farm System ==
=== Minor league standings ===
Standings as of: September 11, 2012

Level	Team	League	Manager	W	L	Position
AAA	Louisville Bats	International League	David Bell	51	93	4th, INT West (38 GB)
AA	Pensacola Blue Wahoos	Southern League	Jim Riggleman	34	35	3rd, SOU South (4 GB) (2nd Half)
High-A	Bakersfield Blaze	California League	Ken Griffey, Sr.	31	39	4th, CAL North (8 GB) (2nd Half)
Low-A	Dayton Dragons	Midwest League	Delino DeShields	30	38	7th, MWL East (11 GB) (2nd Half)
Rookie
Rookie	Billings Mustangs	Pioneer League	Pat Kelly	21	17	2nd, PIO North (2 GB) (2nd Half)
Rookie	AZL Reds	Arizona League	José Nieves	18	38	4th, AZL Central (16½ GB)
Rookie	DSL D-Backs/Reds	Dominican Summer League	Henry Martínez	16	53	8th (32½ GB) Boca Chica South
Rookie	DSL Reds	Dominican Summer League	Joel Noboa	40	29	3rd (2½ GB); Boca Chica Baseball City
