= 2012 Arizona Diamondbacks season =

2012 Arizona Diamondbacks
- League: National League
- Division: West
- Ballpark: Chase Field
- City: Phoenix, Arizona
- Record: 81–81 (.500)
- Divisional place: 3rd
- Owners: Ken Kendrick
- General managers: Kevin Towers
- Managers: Kirk Gibson
- Television: Fox Sports Arizona (Daron Sutton, Greg Schulte, Mark Grace, Joe Garagiola, Luis Gonzalez)
- Radio: KTAR (620 AM) (Greg Schulte, Tom Candiotti, Jeff Munn); KSUN (Spanish)
- Stats: ESPN.com; Baseball Reference

The Arizona Diamondbacks' 2012 season, was the franchise's 15th season in Major League Baseball and also their fifteenth season at Chase Field. The Diamondbacks finished with a record of 81–81, third place in the National League West.

== Offseason ==
Right-handed pitchers Trevor Cahill and Takashi Saito were all acquired by the D-Backs in the offseason, along with slugging left-handed left fielder Jason Kubel and left-handed reliever Craig Breslow.

== Regular season ==
=== NL West standings ===
NL West
Team	W	L	Pct.	GB	Home	Road
San Francisco Giants	94	68	.580	—	48‍–‍33	46‍–‍35
Los Angeles Dodgers	86	76	.531	8	45‍–‍36	41‍–‍40
Arizona Diamondbacks	81	81	.500	13	41‍–‍40	40‍–‍41
San Diego Padres	76	86	.469	18	42‍–‍39	34‍–‍47
Colorado Rockies	64	98	.395	30	35‍–‍46	29‍–‍52

=== NL Wild Card ===
Division leaders
Team	W	L	Pct.
Washington Nationals	98	64	.605
Cincinnati Reds	97	65	.599
San Francisco Giants	94	68	.580

Wild Card teams (Top 2 teams qualify for postseason)
Team	W	L	Pct.	GB
Atlanta Braves	94	68	.580	+6
St. Louis Cardinals	88	74	.543	—
Los Angeles Dodgers	86	76	.531	2
Milwaukee Brewers	83	79	.512	5
Philadelphia Phillies	81	81	.500	7
Arizona Diamondbacks	81	81	.500	7
Pittsburgh Pirates	79	83	.488	9
San Diego Padres	76	86	.469	12
New York Mets	74	88	.457	14
Miami Marlins	69	93	.426	19
Colorado Rockies	64	98	.395	24
Chicago Cubs	61	101	.377	27
Houston Astros	55	107	.340	33

=== Record vs. opponents ===
2012 National League record Source: MLB Standings Grid – 2012
Team	AZ	ATL	CHC	CIN	COL	MIA	HOU	LAD	MIL	NYM	PHI	PIT	SD	SF	STL	WSH	AL
Arizona	–	2–5	5–4	2–5	9–7	5–3	6–0	12–6	3–3	3–4	2–4	3–4	7–11	9–9	1–5	2–4	9–6
Atlanta	5–2	–	3–4	1–5	6–1	14–4	4–2	3–3	3–3	12–6	12–6	3–4	4–3	3–4	5–1	8–10	8–10
Chicago	4–5	4–3	–	4–12	2–4	8–5	2–4	2–4	4–13	4–2	2–4	8–8	3–3	1–6	7–10	1–6	5–10
Cincinnati	5–2	5–1	12–4	–	5–1	10–5	2–4	3–3	9–6	6–2	3–4	11–7	6–2	4–3	6–7	2–5	7–8
Colorado	7–9	1–6	4–2	1–5	–	5–2	5–2	8–10	5–1	5–2	2–7	2–4	8–10	4–14	2–5	4–3	2–13
Houston	0–6	2–4	5–8	5–10	2–5	–	2–4	2–4	8–9	4–2	3–3	5–12	3–5	1–8	4–11	1–7	6–9
Los Angeles	6–12	3–3	4–2	4–2	10–8	4–2	–	4–2	1–6	4–3	5–2	6–1	11–7	8-10	6–5	4–2	6–9
Miami	3–5	4–14	4–2	3–3	4–3	–	4-2	2-4	4–4	4–12	8–10	1–4	5–1	5–2	2–5	9–9	5–13
Milwaukee	3–3	3–3	13–4	6–9	1–5	9–8	6–1	4–4	–	3–2	2–5	11–4	3–4	2–4	6–9	3–5	6–9
New York	4–3	6–12	2–4	2–6	2–5	2–4	3–4	12–4	2–3	–	10–8	5–2	4–3	4–4	4–3	4–14	8–7
Philadelphia	4–2	6–12	4–2	4–3	7–2	3–3	2–5	10–8	5–2	8–10	–	3–4	4–3	2–4	5–2	9-9	5–10
Pittsburgh	4–3	2–3	8–8	7–11	4–2	4–1	12–5	1–6	4–11	2–5	4–3	–	1–5	3–3	8–7	3–2	10–8
San Diego	11–7	3–4	3–3	2–6	10–8	5–3	7–11	1–5	4–3	3–4	3–4	5–1	–	6–12	3–3	2–3	8–7
San Francisco	9–9	4–3	6–1	3–4	14–4	2–5	8–1	10–8	4–2	4–4	4–2	3–3	12–6	–	3–3	1–5	7–8
St. Louis	5–1	1–5	10–7	7–6	5–2	11–4	5–6	5–2	9–6	3–4	3–4	7–8	3–3	3–3	–	3–4	8–7
Washington	4–2	10–8	6–1	5–2	3–4	7–1	2–4	9–9	5–3	14–4	9-9	2–3	3–2	5-1	4-3	–	10–8

=== Roster ===
2012 Arizona Diamondbacks
**Roster**
**Pitchers**: 63 Jonathan Albaladejo; 32 Matt Albers; 17 Trevor Bauer; 52 Brad Bergesen; 32 Craig Breslow; 35 Trevor Cahill; 55 Josh Collmenter; 46 Patrick Corbin; 38 Sam Demel; 30 David Hernandez; 41 Daniel Hudson; 31 Ian Kennedy; 22 Matt Lindstrom; 45 Joe Martinez; 36 Wade Miley; 47 Joe Patterson; 40 J. J. Putz; 48 Takashi Saito; 34 Joe Saunders; 39 Bryan Shaw; 37 Tyler Skaggs; 49 Mike Zagurski; 29 Brad Ziegler	**Catchers**: 12 Henry Blanco; 26 Miguel Montero; 27 Wil Nieves; 33 Konrad Schmidt; **Infielders**: 16 Josh Bell; 18 Willie Bloomquist; 27 Geoff Blum; 6 Stephen Drew; 14 Jake Elmore; 44 Paul Goldschmidt; 2 Aaron Hill; 34 Mike Jacobs; 28 Chris Johnson; 16 John McDonald; 37 Lyle Overbay; 1 Cody Ransom; 14 Ryan Roberts; 21 Ryan Wheeler	**Outfielders**: 6 Adam Eaton; 19 Tyler Graham; 13 Jason Kubel; 8 Gerardo Parra; 11 A. J. Pollock; 10 Justin Upton; 24 Chris Young	**Manager**: 23 Kirk Gibson; **Coaches**: 25 Don Baylor (hitting); 82 Jeff Motuzas (bullpen catcher); 50 Charles Nagy (pitching); 53 Glenn Sherlock (bullpen); 3 Alan Trammell (bench); 80 Wilson Valera (coach); 9 Matt Williams (third base); 7 Eric Young (first base)

=== Game log ===
Legend
Diamondbacks Win	Diamondbacks Loss	Game postponed	**Bold** – Diamondbacks player

2012 game log (81–81)
April (12–11)

#	Date	Opponent	Score	Win	Loss	Save	Attendance	Record
1	April 6	Giants	5–4	**Kennedy** (1–0)	Lincecum (0–1)	**Putz** (1)	49,130	1–0
2	April 7	Giants	5–4	**Hudson** (1–0)	Bumgarner (0–1)	**Putz** (2)	34,789	2–0
3	April 8	Giants	7–6	**Miley** (1–0)	Affeldt (0–1)	**Shaw** (1)	24,193	3–0
4	April 10	@ Padres	4–2 (11)	**Breslow** (1–0)	Owings (0–1)	**Putz** (3)	18,652	4–0
5	April 11	@ Padres	1–2	Frieri (1–0)	**Hernandez** (0–1)	Street (1)	16,091	4–1
6	April 12	@ Padres	3–1	**Kennedy** (2–0)	Owings (0–2)	**Putz** (4)	20,858	5–1
7	April 13	@ Rockies	6–7	Brothers (1–1)	**Shaw** (0–1)	Betancourt (2)	30,642	5–2
8	April 14	@ Rockies	7–8	Chatwood (1–0)	**Putz** (0–1)		29,856	5–3
9	April 15	@ Rockies	5–2	**Cahill** (1–0)	Pomeranz (0–1)	**Shaw** (2)	26,952	6–3
10	April 16	Pirates	5–1	**Saunders** (1–0)	Bédard (0–3)		17,366	7–3
11	April 17	Pirates	4–5	Grilli (1–1)	**Shaw** (0–2)	Cruz (1)	19,198	7–4
12	April 18	Pirates	1–2	Lincoln (1–0)	**Hudson** (1–1)	Cruz (2)	18,368	7–5
13	April 19	Braves	2–10	Minor (2–1)	**Collmenter** (0–1)		18,110	7–6
14	April 20	Braves	1–9	Beachy (2–1)	**Cahill** (1–1)		27,761	7–7
15	April 21	Braves	2–3	Hanson (2–2)	**Saunders** (1–1)	Kimbrel (5)	30,188	7–8
16	April 22	Braves	6–4	**Kennedy** (3–0)	Delgado (2–1)	**Putz** (5)	28,679	8–8
17	April 23	Phillies	9–5	**Miley** (2–0)	Kendrick (0–1)		21,195	9–8
18	April 24	Phillies	5–8	Worley (1–2)	**Collmenter** (0–2)	Papelbon (6)	24,213	9–9
19	April 25	Phillies	2–7	Hamels (3–1)	**Cahill** (1–2)		25,934	9–10
20	April 27	@ Marlins	5–0	**Saunders** (2–1)	Zambrano (0–2)		31,949	10–10
21	April 28	@ Marlins	2–3	Cishek (2–0)	**Ziegler** (0–1)		33,525	10–11
22	April 29	@ Marlins	8–4	**Miley** (3–0)	Johnson (0–3)		34,918	11–11
23	April 30	@ Marlins	9–5	**Corbin** (1–0)	Buehrle (1–4)		31,006	12–11

May (11–17)

#	Date	Opponent	Score	Win	Loss	Save	Attendance	Record
24	May 1	@ Nationals	5–1	**Cahill** (2–2)	Zimmermann (1–2)		22,675	13–11
25	May 2	@ Nationals	4–5	Rodríguez (1–1)	**Putz** (0–2)		16,274	13–12
26	May 3	@ Nationals	1–2	Detwiler (3–1)	**Kennedy** (3–1)	Rodríguez (6)	19,656	13–13
27	May 4	@ Mets	5–4	**Ziegler** (1–1)	Rauch (3–1)	**Putz** (6)	26,995	14–13
28	May 5	@ Mets	3–4	Santana (1–2)	**Corbin** (1–1)	Francisco (6)	30,253	14–14
29	May 6	@ Mets	1–3	Dickey (4–1)	**Cahill** (2–3)	Francisco (7)	29,107	14–15
30	May 7	Cardinals	6–9	Lynn (6–0)	**Saunders** (2–2)	Motte (5)	26,447	14–16
31	May 8	Cardinals	1–6	Westbrook (4–2)	**Kennedy** (3–2)		30,156	14–17
32	May 9	Cardinals	2–7	Lohse (5–1)	**Miley** (3–1)	Motte (6)	27,710	14–18
33	May 11	Giants	5–1	**Corbin** (2–1)	Bumgarner (5–2)		35,792	15–18
34	May 12	Giants	2–5	Cain (2–2)	**Cahill** (2–4)	Casilla (7)	31,719	15–19
35	May 13	Giants	3–7	Zito (2–1)	**Saunders** (2–3)		35,430	15–20
36	May 14	@ Dodgers	1–3	Kershaw (3–1)	**Kennedy** (3–3)	Jansen (4)	24,312	15–21
37	May 15	@ Dodgers	5–1	**Miley** (4–1)	Billingsley (2–3)		47,077	16–21
38	May 16	@ Rockies	1–6	Moyer (2–3)	**Corbin** (2–2)		32,162	16–22
39	May 17	@ Rockies	9–7	**Ziegler** (2–1)	Betancourt (1–1)	**Putz** (7)	32,035	17–22
40	May 18	@ Royals	6–4	**Ziegler** (3–1)	Herrera (0–1)	**Putz** (8)	33,694	18–22
41	May 19	@ Royals	3–7	Chen (3–4)	**Kennedy** (3–4)		27,469	18–23
42	May 20	@ Royals	2–0	**Miley** (5–1)	Adcock (0–2)	**Putz** (9)	24,234	19–23
43	May 21	Dodgers	1–6	Capuano (6–1)	**Corbin** (2–3)		24,768	19–24
44	May 22	Dodgers	7–8	Lindblom (2–0)	**Putz** (0–3)	Jansen (6)	25,738	19–25
45	May 23	Dodgers	11–4	**Saunders** (3–3)	Lilly (5–1)		27,645	20–25
46	May 25	Brewers	1–7	Gallardo (3–4)	**Kennedy** (3–5)		35,478	20–26
47	May 26	Brewers	8–5	**Miley** (6–1)	Greinke (5–2)	**Putz** (10)	30,184	21–26
48	May 27	Brewers	4–3	**Shaw** (1–2)	Veras (3–2)	**Putz** (11)	33,481	22–26
49	May 28	@ Giants	2–4	Zito (4–2)	**Cahill** (2–5)	Casilla (13)	42,295	22–27
50	May 29	@ Giants	1–3	Hensley (2–3)	**Shaw** (1–3)	Casilla (14)	41,371	22–28
51	May 30	@ Giants	4–1	**Kennedy** (4–5)	Lincecum (2–6)	**Hernandez** (1)	41,328	23–28

June (16–10)

#	Date	Opponent	Score	Win	Loss	Save	Attendance	Record
52	June 1	@ Padres	1–7	Cashner (3–3)	**Miley** (6–2)		27,054	23–29
53	June 2	@ Padres	4–2	**Hudson** (2–1)	Thatcher (0–1)	**Putz** (12)	36,559	24–29
54	June 3	@ Padres	6–0	**Cahill** (3–5)	Stults (1–2)		32,228	25–29
55	June 4	Rockies	0–4	Friedrich (4–1)	**Saunders** (3–4)		22,881	25–30
56	June 5	Rockies	10–0	**Kennedy** (5–5)	Guthrie (3–4)		22,322	26–30
57	June 6	Rockies	6–1	**Miley** (7–2)	Outman (0–2)		23,069	27–30
58	June 8	Athletics	9–8	**Putz** (1–3)	Fuentes (2–2)		25,787	28–30
59	June 9	Athletics	8–3	**Cahill** (4–5)	Parker (2–3)		28,061	29–30
60	June 10	Athletics	4–3	**Saunders** (4–4)	Blackley (0–2)	**Putz** (13)	28,112	30–30
61	June 12	@ Rangers	1–9	Lewis (5–5)	**Kennedy** (5–6)		39,140	30–31
62	June 13	@ Rangers	0–1	Adams (1–2)	**Miley** (7–3)	Nathan (13)	45,866	30–32
63	June 14	@ Rangers	11–3	**Hudson** (3–1)	Feldman (0–6)		40,855	31–32
64	June 15	@ Angels	5–0	**Cahill** (5–5)	Haren (4–7)		37,096	32–32
65	June 16	@ Angels	0–2	Santana (4–7)	**Saunders** (4–5)		42,483	32–33
66	June 17	@ Angels	0–2	Richards (2–0)	**Kennedy** (5–7)	Frieri (7)	42,222	32–34
67	June 18	Mariners	7–1	**Miley** (8–3)	Noesí (2–8)		24,284	33–34
68	June 19	Mariners	9–12 (10)	Furbush (3–1)	**Putz** (1–4)	Wilhelmsen (5)	21,568	33–35
69	June 20	Mariners	14–10	**Cahill** (6–5)	Vargas (7–7)		29,630	34–35
70	June 22	Cubs	6–1	**Ziegler** (4–1)	Samardzija (5–6)	**Hernandez** (2)	34,654	35–35
71	June 23	Cubs	10–5	**Breslow** (2–0)	Maholm (4–6)		38,542	36–35
72	June 24	Cubs	5–1	**Miley** (9–3)	Garza (3–6)		33,448	37–35
73	June 26	@ Braves	1–8	Hudson (6–3)	**Hudson** (3–2)		23,513	37–36
74	June 27	@ Braves	4–6	Hanson (9–4)	**Cahill** (6–6)	Kimbrel (22)	20,039	37–37
75	June 28	@ Braves	3–2	**Hernandez** (1–1)	Kimbrel (0–1)	**Putz** (14)	21,913	38–37
76	June 29	@ Brewers	9–3	**Kennedy** (6–7)	Wolf (2–6)		38,030	39–37
77	June 30	@ Brewers	2–10	Fiers (3–2)	**Miley** (9–4)		41,647	39–38

July (14–13)

#	Date	Opponent	Score	Win	Loss	Save	Attendance	Record
78	July 1	@ Brewers	1–2	Axford (2–5)	**Corbin** (2–4)		38,605	39–39
79	July 2	Padres	2–6	Richard (6–8)	**Cahill** (6–7)	Thatcher (1)	19,633	39–40
80	July 3	Padres	5–9	Ohlendorf (2–0)	**Bauer** (0–1)		21,329	39–41
81	July 4	Padres	6–8	Gregerson (2–0)	**Hernandez** (1–2)	Street (13)	48,819	39–42
82	July 5	Dodgers	1–4	Eovaldi (1–5)	**Miley** (9–5)	Jansen (15)	23,002	39–43
83	July 6	Dodgers	5–3	**Collmenter** (1–2)	Kershaw (6–5)	**Putz** (15)	24,891	40–43
84	July 7	Dodgers	5–3	**Cahill** (7–7)	Billingsley (4–9)	**Putz** (16)	36,903	41–43
85	July 8	Dodgers	7–1	**Bauer** (1–1)	Capuano (9–4)	**Corbin** (1)	30,523	42–43
86	July 13	@ Cubs	1–8	Maholm (7–6)	**Kennedy** (6–8)		36,878	42–44
87	July 14	@ Cubs	1–4	Dempster (5–3)	**Saunders** (4–6)	Mármol (9)	38,068	42–45
88	July 15	@ Cubs	1–3	Garza (5–7)	**Cahill** (7–8)	Mármol (10)	36,659	42–46
89	July 16	@ Reds	5–3	**Miley** (10–5)	Arroyo (4–6)	**Putz** (17)	27,735	43–46
90	July 17	@ Reds	0–4	Cueto (11–5)	**Bauer** (1–2)	Chapman (14)	19,142	43–47
91	July 18	@ Reds	7–1	**Kennedy** (7–8)	Latos (7–3)		26,077	44–47
92	July 19	@ Reds	6–7	Simón (2–1)	**Shaw** (1–4)	Chapman (15)	21,620	44–48
93	July 20	Astros	13–8	**Cahill** (8–8)	Norris (5–8)		23,567	45–48
94	July 21	Astros	12–3	**Miley** (11–5)	Keuchel (1–2)		35,665	46–48
95	July 22	Astros	8–2	**Collmenter** (2–2)	Lyles (2–7)		20,951	47–48
96	July 23	Rockies	6–3	**Kennedy** (8–8)	Sánchez (1–7)	**Putz** (18)	20,056	48–48
97	July 24	Rockies	6–2	**Saunders** (5–6)	Cabrera (0–2)		20,432	49–48
98	July 25	Rockies	2–4	Francis (3–2)	**Cahill** (8–9)	Betancourt (17)	23,385	49–49
99	July 26	Mets	1–3	Harvey (1–0)	**Miley** (11–6)	Parnell (3)	22,010	49–50
100	July 27	Mets	11–5	**Collmenter** (3–2)	Niese (7–5)		23,150	50–50
101	July 28	Mets	6–3	**Kennedy** (9–8)	Young (2–5)	**Putz** (19)	33,759	51–50
102	July 29	Mets	1–5	Dickey (14–2)	**Saunders** (5–7)		32,134	51–51
103	July 30	@ Dodgers	7–2	**Cahill** (9–9)	Harang (7–6)		33,180	52–51
104	July 31	@ Dodgers	8–2	**Miley** (12–6)	Capuano (10–7)		52,832	53–51

August (13–16)

#	Date	Opponent	Score	Win	Loss	Save	Attendance	Record
105	August 1	@ Dodgers	4–0	**Corbin** (3–4)	Fife (0–1)		36,596	54–51
106	August 3	@ Phillies	4–2	**Kennedy** (10–8)	Kendrick (4–9)	**Putz** (20)	43,766	55–51
107	August 4	@ Phillies	0–3	Halladay (5–6)	**Saunders** (5–8)	Papelbon (24)	43,762	55–52
108	August 5	@ Phillies	4–5	Papelbon (3–4)	**Collmenter** (3–3)		43,741	55–53
109	August 6	@ Pirates	0–4	Bédard (6–12)	**Miley** (12–7)		24,213	55–54
110	August 7	@ Pirates	10–4	**Ziegler** (5–1)	Grilli (1–4)		22,655	56–54
111	August 8	@ Pirates	6–7	Correia (9–6)	**Kennedy** (10–9)	Hanrahan (33)	25,175	56–55
112	August 9	@ Pirates	6–3	**Saunders** (6–8)	Rodríguez (7–11)	**Putz** (21)	20,558	57–55
113	August 10	Nationals	1–9	Strasburg (13–5)	**Cahill** (9–10)		29,362	57–56
114	August 11	Nationals	5–6	Jackson (7–7)	**Miley** (12–8)	Clippard (24)	34,030	57–57
115	August 12	Nationals	7–4	**Corbin** (4–4)	Detwiler (6–5)	**Putz** (22)	27,345	58–57
116	August 14	@ Cardinals	2–8	Kelly (3–5)	**Kennedy** (10–10)		34,587	58–58
117	August 15	@ Cardinals	2–5	Wainwright (11–10)	**Saunders** (6–9)	Motte (27)	33,572	58–59
118	August 16	@ Cardinals	2–1	**Hernandez** (2–2)	Motte (4–4)	**Putz** (23)	36,758	59–59
119	August 17	@ Astros	3–1	**Miley** (13–8)	Keuchel (1–5)	**Putz** (24)	19,223	60–59
120	August 18	@ Astros	12–4	**Corbin** (5–4)	Lyles (2–10)		20,838	61–59
121	August 19	@ Astros	8–1	**Kennedy** (11–10)	Galarraga (0–4)		14,923	62–59
122	August 20	Marlins	3–12	Buehrle (11–11)	**Saunders** (6–10)		17,707	62–60
123	August 21	Marlins	5–6 (10)	Gaudin (2–1)	**Demel** (0–1)	Cishek (10)	17,434	62–61
124	August 22	Marlins	3–2	**Skaggs** (1–0)	Turner (1–2)	**Putz** (25)	17,239	63–61
125	August 22	Marlins	3–0	**Miley** (14–8)	LeBlanc (2–3)	**Putz** (26)	20,027	64–61
126	August 24	Padres	0–5	Stults (4–2)	**Corbin** (5–5)		32,726	64–62
127	August 25	Padres	3–9	Richard (11–12)	**Kennedy** (11–11)		27,619	64–63
128	August 26	Padres	4–5	Vólquez (9–9)	**Cahill** (9–11)	Gregerson (1)	28,172	64–64
129	August 27	Reds	2–3	Arroyo (11–7)	**Skaggs** (1–1)	Chapman (32)	17,966	64–65
130	August 28	Reds	2–5	Cueto (17–6)	**Miley** (14–9)	Chapman (33)	20,550	64–66
131	August 29	Reds	2–6	Latos (11–4)	**Corbin** (5–6)		18,451	64–67
132	August 30	@ Dodgers	2–0	**Kennedy** (12–11)	Kershaw (12–8)	**Putz** (27)	54,621	65–67
133	August 31	@ Dodgers	4–3 (11)	**Bergesen** (1–0)	Guerrier (0–2)	**Putz** (28)	37,622	66–67

September (14–12)

#	Date	Opponent	Score	Win	Loss	Save	Attendance	Record
134	September 1	@ Dodgers	1–2	Beckett (6–12)	**Albers** (2–1)	League (10)	35,992	66–68
135	September 2	@ Dodgers	4–5	Belisario (4–1)	**Putz** (1–5)		31,607	66–69
136	September 3	@ Giants	8–9 (10)	Romo (4–2)	**Shaw** (1–5)		42,045	66–70
137	September 4	@ Giants	8–6 (11)	**Collmenter** (4–3)	Kontos (1–1)		41,038	67–70
138	September 5	@ Giants	6–2	**Cahill** (10–11)	Bumgarner (14–10)		41,035	68–70
139	September 7	@ Padres	5–6	Brach (2–4)	**Hernandez** (2–3)	Gregerson (5)	25,403	68–71
140	September 8	@ Padres	8–5	**Miley** (15–9)	Kelly (1–1)	**Putz** (29)	25,514	69–71
141	September 9	@ Padres	2–8	Werner (2–1)	**Corbin** (5–7)		21,037	69–72
142	September 11	Dodgers	1–0	**Kennedy** (13–11)	Kershaw (12–9)	**Hernandez** (3)	23,966	70–72
143	September 12	Dodgers	3–2	**Cahill** (11–11)	Harang (9–9)	**Hernandez** (4)	25,048	71–72
144	September 14	Giants	2–6	Cain (14–5)	**Skaggs** (1–2)		31,856	71–73
145	September 15	Giants	2–3	Zito (12–8)	**Miley** (15–10)	Romo (11)	39,169	71–74
146	September 16	Giants	10–2	**Corbin** (6–7)	Vogelsong (12–9)		29,051	72–74
147	September 18	Padres	3–2	**Kennedy** (14–11)	Stults (6–3)	**Putz** (30)	20,811	73–74
148	September 19	Padres	6–2	**Cahill** (12–11)	Vólquez (10–11)		21,013	74–74
149	September 20	Padres	5–6	Richard (14–12)	**Skaggs** (1–3)	Bass (1)	17,821	74–75
150	September 21	@ Rockies	15–5	**Miley** (16–10)	White (2–9)		42,359	75–75
151	September 22	@ Rockies	8–7	**Bergesen** (2–0)	Torres (4–3)	**Putz** (31)	33,689	76–75
152	September 23	@ Rockies	10–7	**Albers** (3–1)	Belisle (3–8)	**Putz** (32)	32,448	77–75
153	September 24	@ Rockies	2–4	Chatwood (5–5)	**Cahill** (12–12)	Betancourt (30)	22,277	77–76
154	September 25	@ Giants	7–2	**Collmenter** (5–3)	Lincecum (10–15)		41,153	78–76
155	September 26	@ Giants	0–6	Cain (16–5)	**Miley** (16–11)		41,516	78–77
156	September 27	@ Giants	3–7	Zito (14–8)	**Corbin** (6–8)		41,128	78–78
157	September 28	Cubs	8–3	**Kennedy** (15–11)	Wood (6–13)		28,463	79–78
158	September 29	Cubs	8–2	**Cahill** (13–12)	Germano (2–10)		29,084	80–78
159	September 30	Cubs	2–7	Rusin (2–3)	**Shaw** (1–6)		35,535	80–79

October (1–2)

#	Date	Opponent	Score	Win	Loss	Save	Attendance	Record
160	October 1	Rockies	5–7	Outman (1–3)	**Bergesen** (2–1)	Roenicke (1)	24,123	80–80
161	October 2	Rockies	5–3	**Ziegler** (6–1)	Betancourt (1–4)		22,466	81–80
162	October 3	Rockies	1–2	Francis (6–7)	**Kennedy** (15–12)	Belisle (3)	24,344	81–81

== Player stats ==
=== Batting ===
Note: G = Games played; AB = At bats; R = Runs scored; H = Hits; 2B = Doubles; 3B = Triples; HR = Home runs; RBI = Runs batted in; SB = Stolen bases; AVG = Batting average

Player	G	AB	R	H	2B	3B	HR	RBI	SB	AVG
Aaron Hill	156	609	93	184	44	6	26	85	14	.302
Justin Upton	150	554	107	155	24	4	17	67	18	.280
Paul Goldschmidt	145	514	82	147	43	1	20	82	18	.286
Jason Kubel	141	506	75	128	30	4	30	90	1	.253
Miguel Montero	141	486	65	139	25	2	15	88	0	.286
Gerardo Parra	133	385	58	105	21	2	7	36	15	.273
Chris Young	101	325	36	75	24	0	14	41	8	.231
Willie Bloomquist	80	324	47	98	21	5	0	23	7	.302
Ryan Roberts	83	252	28	63	9	0	6	34	6	.250
John McDonald	70	197	16	49	9	0	6	22	0	.249
Chris Johnson	44	147	12	42	7	2	7	35	1	.286
Stephen Drew	40	135	17	26	8	1	2	12	0	.193
Ryan Wheeler	50	109	11	26	6	1	1	10	1	.239
Lyle Overbay	45	96	11	28	9	0	2	10	0	.292
Adam Eaton	22	85	19	22	3	2	2	5	2	.259
AJ Pollock	31	81	8	20	4	1	2	8	1	.247
Cody Ransom	26	78	11	21	7	0	5	16	0	.269
Jake Elmore	30	68	1	13	4	0	0	7	0	.191
Henry Blanco	21	64	6	12	3	0	1	7	1	.188
Josh Bell	21	52	3	9	2	0	1	4	0	.173
Wil Nieves	16	36	4	11	1	0	1	3	0	.306
Geoff Blum	17	28	1	4	0	0	0	1	0	.143
Mike Jacobs	13	19	4	4	1	0	0	2	0	.211
Konrad Schmidt	4	7	1	0	0	0	0	2	0	.000
Tyler Graham	10	2	1	0	0	0	0	0	0	.000
Pitcher Totals	162	303	17	35	2	2	0	20	0	.116
Team totals	162	5462	734	1416	307	33	165	710	93	.259

=== Pitching ===
Note: W = Wins; L = Losses; ERA = Earned run average; G = Games pitched; GS = Games started; SV = Saves; IP = Innings pitched; H = Hits allowed; R = Runs allowed; ER = Earned runs allowed; BB = Walks allowed; K = Strikeouts

Player	W	L	ERA	G	GS	SV	IP	H	R	ER	BB	K
Ian Kennedy	15	12	4.02	33	33	0	208.1	216	101	93	55	187
Trevor Cahill	13	12	3.78	32	32	0	200.0	184	93	84	74	156
Wade Miley	16	11	3.33	32	29	0	194.2	193	79	72	37	144
Joe Saunders	6	10	4.22	21	21	0	130.0	146	68	61	31	89
Patrick Corbin	6	8	4.54	22	17	1	107.1	117	56	54	25	86
Josh Collmenter	5	3	3.69	28	11	0	90.1	92	39	37	22	80
Brad Ziegler	6	1	2.49	77	0	0	68.2	54	21	19	21	42
David Hernandez	2	3	2.50	72	0	4	68.1	48	21	19	22	98
Bryan Shaw	1	6	3.49	64	0	2	59.1	60	29	23	24	41
J.J. Putz	1	5	2.82	57	0	32	54.1	45	18	17	11	65
Daniel Hudson	3	2	7.35	9	9	0	45.1	62	37	37	12	37
Craig Breslow	2	0	2.70	40	0	0	43.1	38	15	13	13	42
Mike Zagurski	0	0	5.54	45	0	0	37.1	37	24	23	19	34
Brad Bergesen	2	1	3.64	19	0	0	29.2	29	14	12	7	18
Tyler Skaggs	1	3	5.83	6	6	0	29.1	30	20	19	13	21
Matt Albers	1	1	2.57	23	0	0	21.0	16	7	6	7	19
Trevor Bauer	1	2	6.06	4	4	0	16.1	14	13	11	13	17
Takashi Saito	0	0	6.75	16	0	0	12.0	17	14	9	5	11
Matt Lindstrom	0	0	2.53	12	0	0	10.2	10	3	3	2	10
Jonathan Albaladejo	0	0	9.00	3	0	0	3.0	5	3	3	0	2
Joe Paterson	0	0	37.13	6	0	0	2.2	15	11	11	3	0
Sam Demel	0	1	9.00	1	0	0	1.0	2	1	1	1	0
Joe Martinez	0	0	9.00	1	0	0	1.0	2	1	1	0	1
Team totals	81	81	3.93	162	162	39	1433.2	1432	688	626	417	1200

== Farm system ==
Level	Team	League	Manager
AAA	Reno Aces	Pacific Coast League	Brett Butler
AA	Mobile BayBears	Southern League	Turner Ward
A	Visalia Rawhide	California League	Jason Hardtke
A	South Bend Silver Hawks	Midwest League	Mark Haley
A-Short Season	Yakima Bears	Northwest League	Audo Vicente
Rookie	AZL Diamondbacks	Arizona League	Héctor de la Cruz
Rookie	Missoula Osprey	Pioneer League	Andy Green

League Champions: Reno, Mobile, Missoula
