= Sam LeCure =

American baseball player (born 1984)

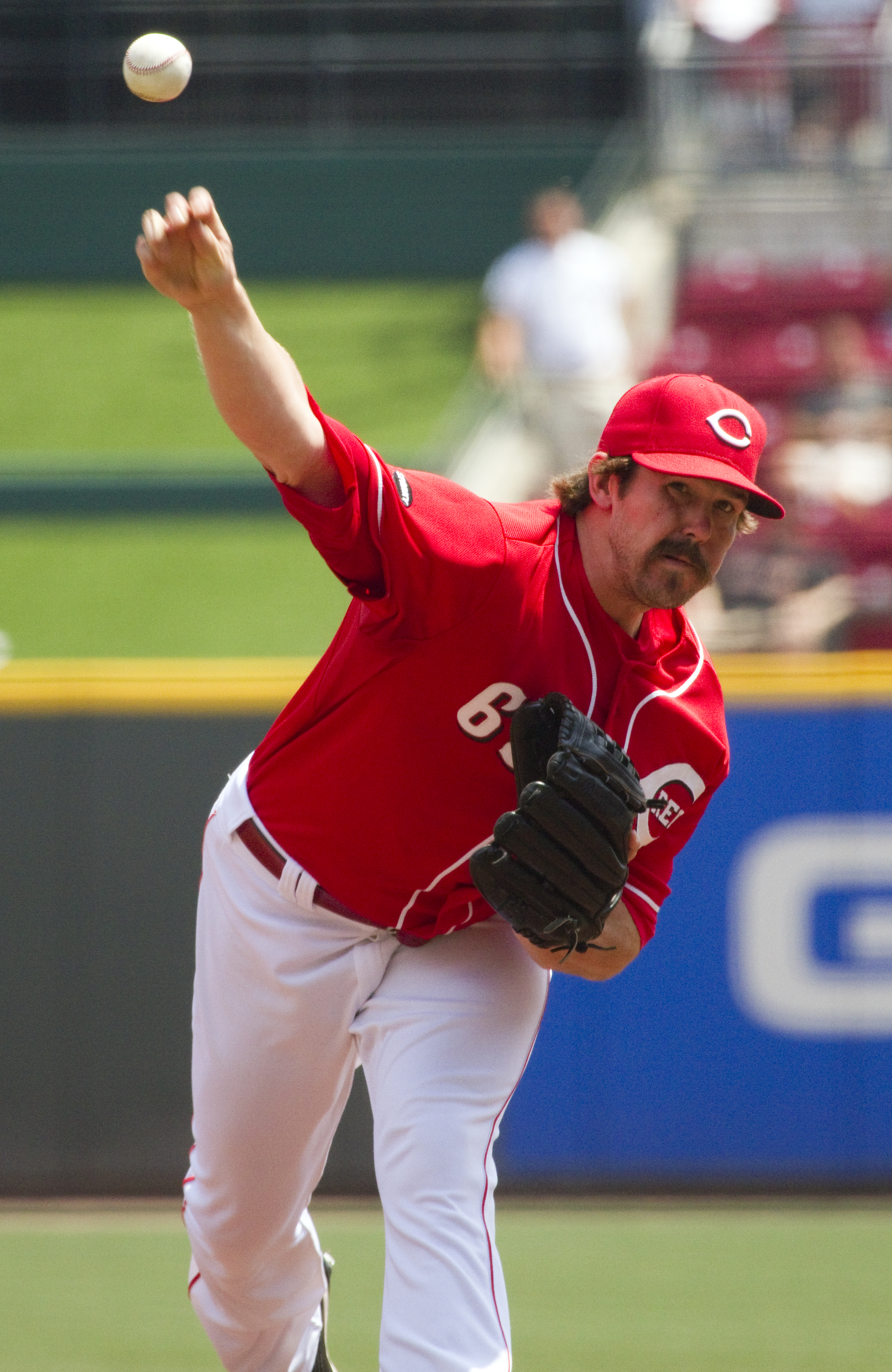
- LeCure with the Cincinnati Reds in 2011
- Pitcher
- Born: May 4, 1984 (age 42); Jefferson City, Missouri, U.S.
- Batted: Right Threw: Right

MLB debut
- May 28, 2010, for the Cincinnati Reds

Last MLB appearance
- October 4, 2015, for the Cincinnati Reds

MLB statistics
- Win–loss record: 10–16
- Earned run average: 3.51
- Strikeouts: 300
- Stats at Baseball Reference

Teams
- Cincinnati Reds (2010–2015)

Samuel Rohrer LeCure (born May 4, 1984) is an American former professional baseball relief pitcher. He attended Helias High School in Jefferson City, Missouri and the University of Texas. He played in Major League Baseball (MLB) for the Cincinnati Reds.

== College career ==
With the University of Texas in 2003, in 16 games pitched including six starts, LeCure went 5–0 with a 3.74 ERA. The Longhorns posted an overall record of 50–20, advancing to the 2003 College World Series, where they finished in a tie for third place. In 2004, he pitched 24 games, all but one of them as a starter, and went 9–3 with a 2.34 ERA as the Longhorns went 58–15. They again advanced to the College World Series, where they finished as the national runner-up to Cal State Fullerton.

== Professional career ==
=== Cincinnati Reds ===
==== Minor leagues ====
LeCure was originally drafted by the Philadelphia Phillies out of high school in the 45th round of the 2002 Major League Baseball draft but did not sign. He was then drafted and signed by the Reds in the fourth round (122nd overall) of the 2005 Major League Baseball draft.

LeCure began his minor league career in 2005 with the Billings Mustangs, going 5–1 with a 3.27 ERA in 13 games (six starts). In 41 1/3 innings, he posted 44 strikeouts.

For the Sarasota Reds in 2006, he went 7–12 with a 3.43 ERA in 27 starts. In 2007, he started one game for the Sarasota Reds and spent the rest of the season with the Double–A Chattanooga Lookouts, going a combined 8–5 with a 4.07 ERA in 22 starts.

He repeated Double–A in 2008 with Chattanooga, going 9–7 with a 3.42 ERA in 27 starts. LeCure spent the entire 2009 season pitching for Triple–A Louisville Bats, going 10–8 with a 4.46 ERA in 25 starts.

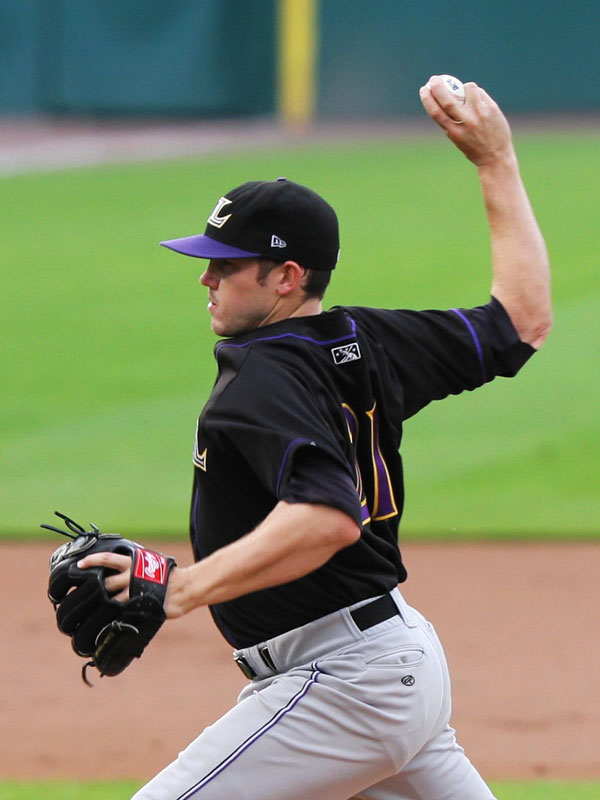
LeCure pitching for the Louisville Bats, Triple-A affiliates of the Cincinnati Reds, in 2009.

==== Major leagues ====
On May 26, 2010, LeCure was promoted to the major leagues for the first time, temporarily replacing an injured Homer Bailey on the roster. LeCure made his major league debut in a start for the Reds on Friday, May 28, against the Houston Astros. He pitched six innings and gave up two runs and six hits with four walks while striking out five batters as the Reds won 15–6. LeCure ended his rookie season with a 2–5 record and a 4.50 ERA and 37 strikeouts in 48 innings over 15 games (six starts).

LeCure made 43 appearances for Cincinnati during the 2011 campaign, registering a 2–1 record and 3.71 ERA with 73 strikeouts across 77 2/3 innings pitched. In 2012, he made 48 appearances for the Reds, posting a 3–3 record and 3.14 ERA with 61 strikeouts across 57 1/3 innings pitched. That year, in three postseason games, LeCure yielded only two hits and no runs as the Reds eventually fell to the San Francisco Giants, the eventual World Series champions.

In 2013, LeCure made 63 appearances for Cincinnati, compiling a 2–1 record and a career-best 2.66 ERA with 66 strikeouts over 61 innings pitched. In 2014, LeCure pitched in 62 games out of the bullpen for the Reds, logging a 1–4 record and a 3.81 (the worst since his rookie season) with 48 strikeouts across 56 2/3 innings pitched. The Reds would go on to finish 76–86, failing to make the playoffs.

LeCure did not make the Reds' Opening Day roster entering the 2015 season. On April 2, 2015, he was removed from the 40-man roster and sent outright to Triple-A Louisville. In 41 appearances for the Bats, LeCure compiled a 5–4 record and 5.25 ERA with 44 strikeouts and one save over 60 innings. On August 20, the Reds selected LeCure's contract, adding him back to their active roster. He pitched in 19 games for Cincinnati on the year, posting an 0–2 record and 3.15 ERA with 50 strikeouts over 20 innings of work. On November 2, LeCure was again removed from the 40-man roster and sent outright to Triple-A Louisville. He elected free agency on November 6.

=== Los Angeles Dodgers ===
On January 12, 2016, LeCure signed a minor league contract with the Arizona Diamondbacks organization. He was released prior to the start of the season on March 28.

LeCure signed a minor league contract with the Los Angeles Dodgers on April 7, 2016. In 31 appearances (12 starts) for the Triple-A Oklahoma City Dodgers, he compiled a 5–5 record and 4.55 ERA with 73 strikeouts across 91 innings of work. LeCure elected free agency following the season on November 7.

== Broadcasting career ==
In 2023 LeCure is in his sixth season as an analyst and co-host for the Cincinnati Reds Emmy Award-winning "Reds Live" pre-game and post-game shows on FanDuel Sports Network Ohio and part-time color analyst for select games on the Reds Radio Network.

== Personal life ==
LeCure is the youngest of eight children.
