= Alfredo Simón =

Dominican baseball player (born 1981)

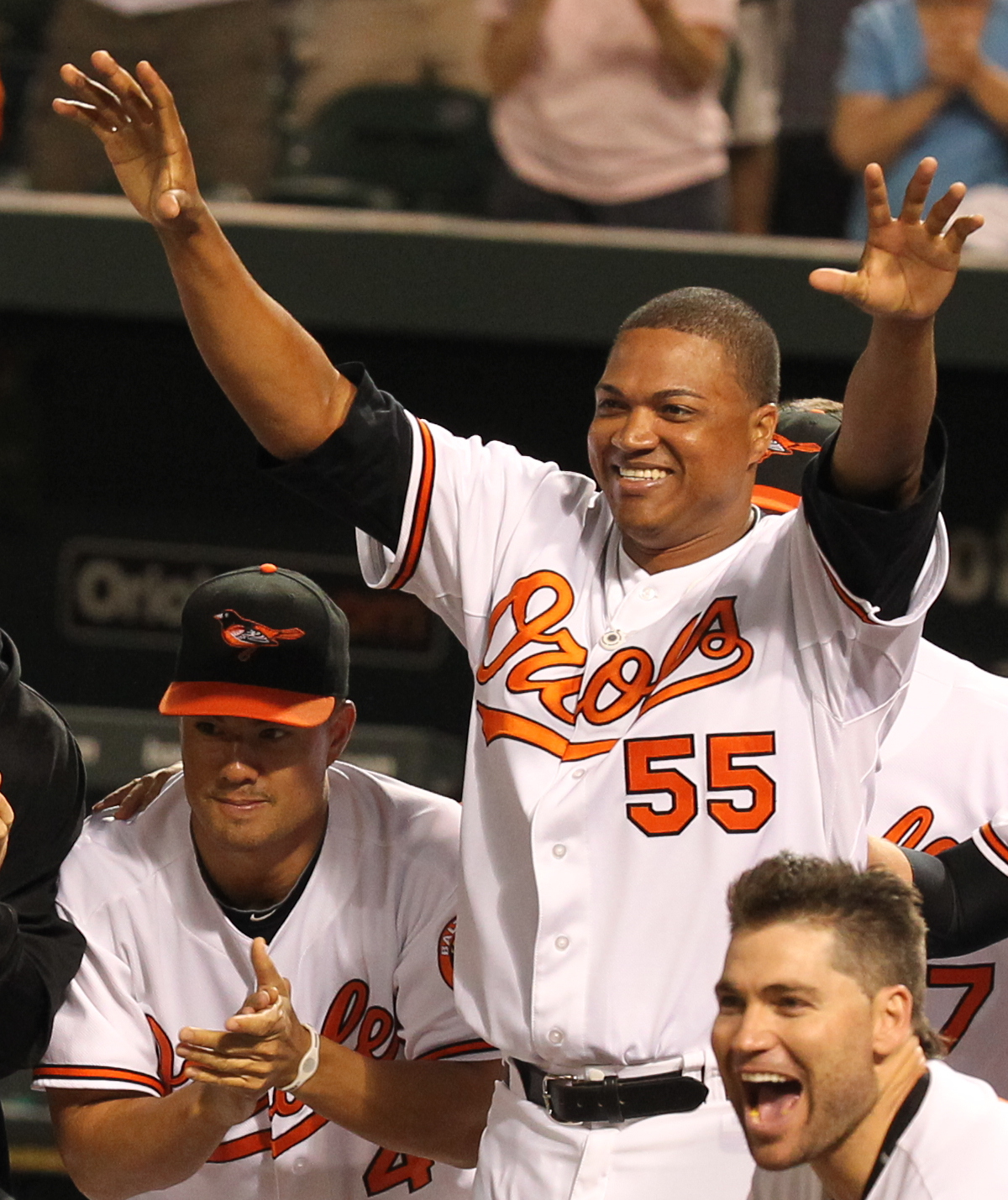
- Simón with the Baltimore Orioles in 2011
- Pitcher
- Born: May 8, 1981 (age 45); Santiago, Dominican Republic
- Batted: Right Threw: Right

MLB debut
- September 6, 2008, for the Baltimore Orioles

Last MLB appearance
- September 5, 2016, for the Cincinnati Reds

MLB statistics
- Win–loss record: 47–47
- Earned run average: 4.56
- Strikeouts: 529
- Stats at Baseball Reference

Teams
- Baltimore Orioles (2008–2011); Cincinnati Reds (2012–2014); Detroit Tigers (2015); Cincinnati Reds (2016)

Career highlights and awards
- All-Star (2014)
Medals
Men's baseball
Representing Dominican Republic
World Baseball Classic
Gold medal – first place	2013 San Francisco	Team

Alfredo Simón Cabrera (born May 8, 1981) is a Dominican former professional baseball pitcher. He played in Major League Baseball (MLB) for the Baltimore Orioles, Detroit Tigers and Cincinnati Reds. From 2001 through part of 2004 he pitched under the name Carlos Cabrera.

== Professional career ==
=== Minor leagues ===
==== Philadelphia Phillies ====
Simón was signed on July 9, 1999, by the Philadelphia Phillies. He originally signed under the name Carlos Cabrera, and he pretended to be 21 months younger than he really was. He made his professional debut in 2000 for the La Vega Phillies in the Dominican Summer League. In 2004, the Phillies found out his real name and age.

==== San Francisco Giants ====
On July 30, 2004, Simón was traded with Ricky Ledée to the San Francisco Giants for Felix Rodríguez.

Simón was assigned to the Single-A San Jose Giants. He got off to a bad start, posting a 5.68 ERA in six starts while going 1–2. In 2005, he was promoted to the Double-A Norwich Navigators. He started for only part of the year, and closed for most of the season, going 3–8 with 19 saves while posting a 5.03 ERA in 43 games (nine starts). In 2006, Simón started the season at San Jose, but was later promoted to the AAA Fresno Grizzlies. In 28 combined games (17 starts), he went 2–10 with a 6.62 ERA. Following the season, he filed for free agency.

==== Texas Rangers ====
On November 3, 2006, Simón signed with the Texas Rangers. In December, the Baltimore Orioles drafted him in the Rule 5 draft. On the same day, the Orioles traded him back to the Philadelphia Phillies for Adam Donachie and cash.

On March 17, 2007, the Phillies returned Simón to the Rangers. Simón pitched as a starter for the Triple-A Oklahoma RedHawks. He had a bad year, going 5–10 with a 6.43 ERA in 22 starts. Following the season, he filed for free agency.

==== Los Angeles Dodgers ====
On January 10, 2008, Simón signed with the Los Angeles Dodgers. He was released on March 30, before the season started.

==== Mexican League ====
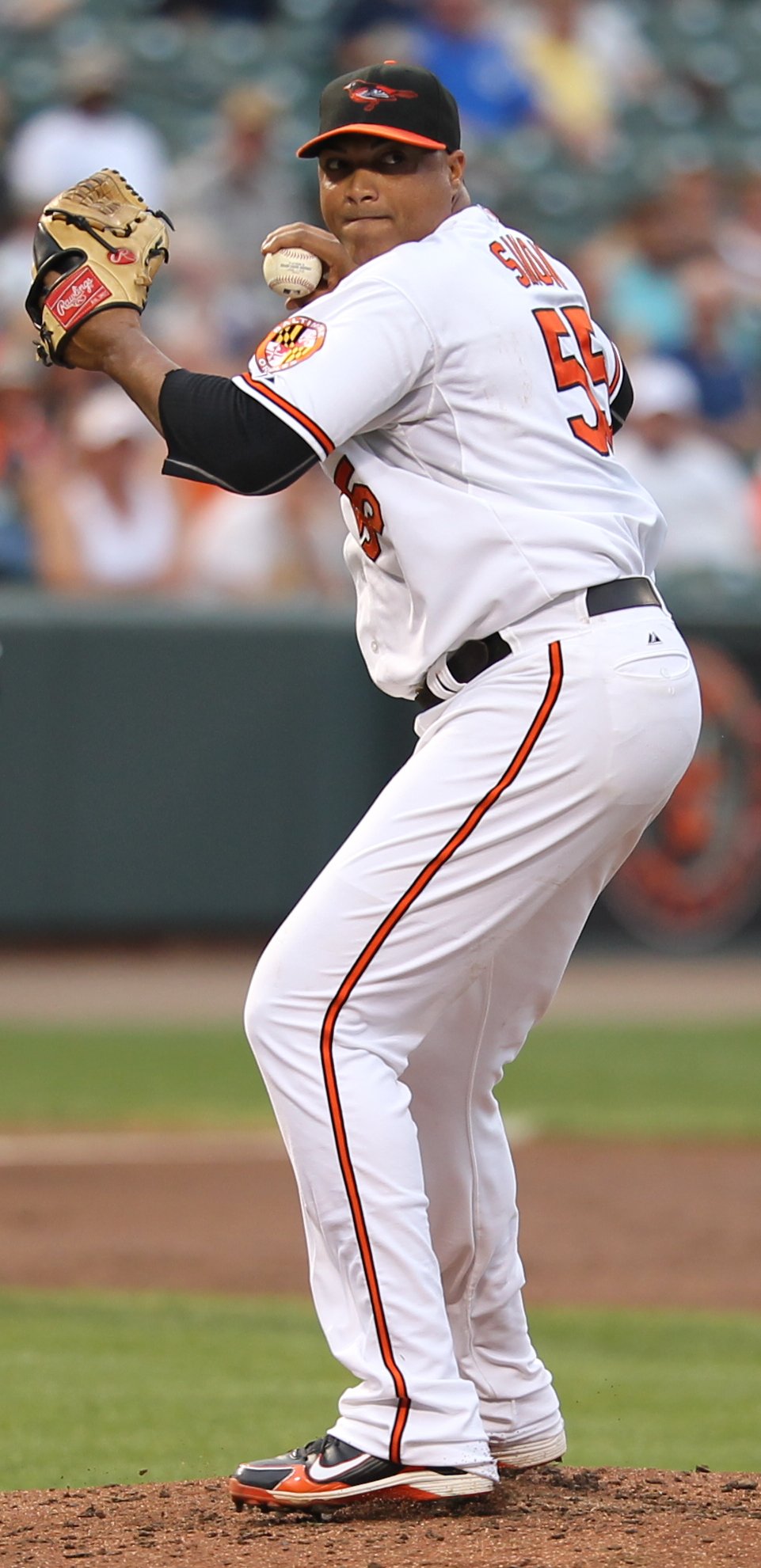
Simón pitching for the Baltimore Orioles

After being released, Simón signed with the independent Sultanes de Monterrey of the Mexican League. He pitched very well with them, going 7–2 with a 2.67 ERA in 15 games (11 starts). During the season, he was signed by the Baltimore Orioles on September 5.

=== Major leagues ===
==== Baltimore Orioles ====
The Orioles originally assigned Simón to the AAA Norfolk Tides, but they quickly called him up. On September 6, he made his MLB debut. He finished 2008 with a 6.23 ERA in four games (one start) and no decisions. In 2009, after a strong spring training, he was named to the Orioles' starting rotation. However, he was injured in only his second start and missed the rest of the year after undergoing Tommy John surgery.

Simón failed to make the Orioles out of spring training in 2010, but on April 27, the Orioles promoted Simón from Triple-A Norfolk. The same day, he became the Orioles' closer (due to bad pitching and a subsequent injury to Mike Gonzalez), and he notched his first save against the New York Yankees. He pitched an inning and gave up no earned runs (and two unearned). Coincidentally, the Yankees were the same team Simón earned his first decision against. Simón converted his first five save opportunities before blowing one against the Cleveland Indians on May 15. In 49 relief appearances, Simón was 4–2 with a 4.93 ERA while converting 17 of 21 save opportunities. After blowing a save on August 9, he did not receive another save opportunity as Koji Uehara was used most often in the role.

On May 21, 2011, Simón was activated from the restricted list. Jason Berken was sent down to make room.

==== Cincinnati Reds ====
On April 3, 2012, the Cincinnati Reds claimed Simón off waivers from the Orioles. He served in the bullpen for the season, posting a 3–2 record with one save and a 2.66 ERA in 36 games.

He spent most of the 2013 season as a part of the Reds bullpen. He went 6–4 and posted a 2.87 ERA in 63 appearances.

He began the 2014 season in the Reds' starting rotation after an injury to Mat Latos. He immediately excelled in the role, after having only started 19 games in his MLB career prior to 2014, and at the All-Star break he led the National League with 12 wins (against only three losses) to go with a 2.70 ERA.

On July 13, 2014, Simón was named to the 2014 Major League Baseball All-Star Game, replacing fellow Red Johnny Cueto, who was unavailable to pitch due to starting a game the previous Sunday. Simon was mobbed by his teammates in the dugout when the announcement was made during the game. In the All-Star game, Simón pitched a scoreless third inning, allowing one hit and striking out one batter. He would win only three more games after the All-Star break, finishing at 15–10 with a 3.44 ERA in 32 starts, while throwing a career-high 196 1/3 innings.

==== Detroit Tigers ====
On December 11, 2014, the Reds traded Simón to the Detroit Tigers for Jonathon Crawford and Eugenio Suárez. On January 16, 2015, Simón and the Tigers avoided arbitration when the two parties agreed on a one-year contract worth $5.5 million.

On August 20, 2015, Simón recorded his first career complete game shutout in the Tigers 4–0 win over the Texas Rangers. He allowed only one hit in the contest, a double to Rougned Odor in the fifth inning, while walking two and striking out five. Despite finishing the season with a league-worst 5.05 ERA, Simón led the Tigers in wins (13) and innings pitched (187).

==== Second stint with Cincinnati ====
On March 17, 2016, Simón signed a one-year deal to return to the Reds.

=== Long Island Ducks ===
On June 6, 2017, Simon signed with the Long Island Ducks of the Atlantic League of Professional Baseball. He became a free agent after the 2017 season. In 12 games (9 starts) he threw 55.1 innings going 2-3 with a 4.55 ERA with 48 strikeouts, 1 save and also throwing one complete game shutout.

=== Tigres de Quintana Roo ===
On July 3, 2018, Simon signed with the Tigres de Quintana Roo of the Mexican Baseball League. He was released on August 16, 2018. In 16 games 19.1 innings of relief he went 1-0 with a 2.33 ERA with 17 strikeouts and 4 saves.

=== Acereros de Monclova ===
On June 25, 2021, Simón signed with the Acereros de Monclova of the Mexican League. Simón allowed three runs without recording an out in his only appearance with Monclova, and was released by the team the next day.

== Pitch selection ==
Simón is primarily a fastball pitcher, throwing several varieties of the pitch. He throws four-seam and two-seam fastballs in the 92–94 MPH range (topping out at 97 MPH), plus a split-finger fastball in the 83–85 MPH range (topping out at 89 MPH). The split-finger is his favorite pitch with two strikes on the hitter. He also throws a standard curveball that averages about 77–79 MPH, plus an extremely slow curveball that averages about 66–69 MPH. The slow curve has been clocked as low as 49 MPH, leading some analysts to call it an eephus pitch.

== Legal incidents ==
=== Involuntary manslaughter allegations ===
In January 2011, Simón allegedly shot and killed Michel Castillo Almonte and wounded his 17-year-old brother during a New Year's Eve celebration in Luperón, Dominican Republic. Simón denied the allegations. Police then announced their intention to file involuntary manslaughter charges. In March 2011, Simón posted bail. On November 8, 2011, Simon was acquitted of involuntary manslaughter.

=== Rape allegation ===
In April 2014, Simón was sued for $15 million by a woman who alleged that he had raped her in a Washington, D.C. hotel room about one year earlier, while the Reds were in Washington for a series against the Washington Nationals. While no criminial charges were ever filed, a civil suit was settled out of court in 2015.

== See also ==
- Rule 5 draft results
