= Mat Latos =

American baseball player (born 1987)

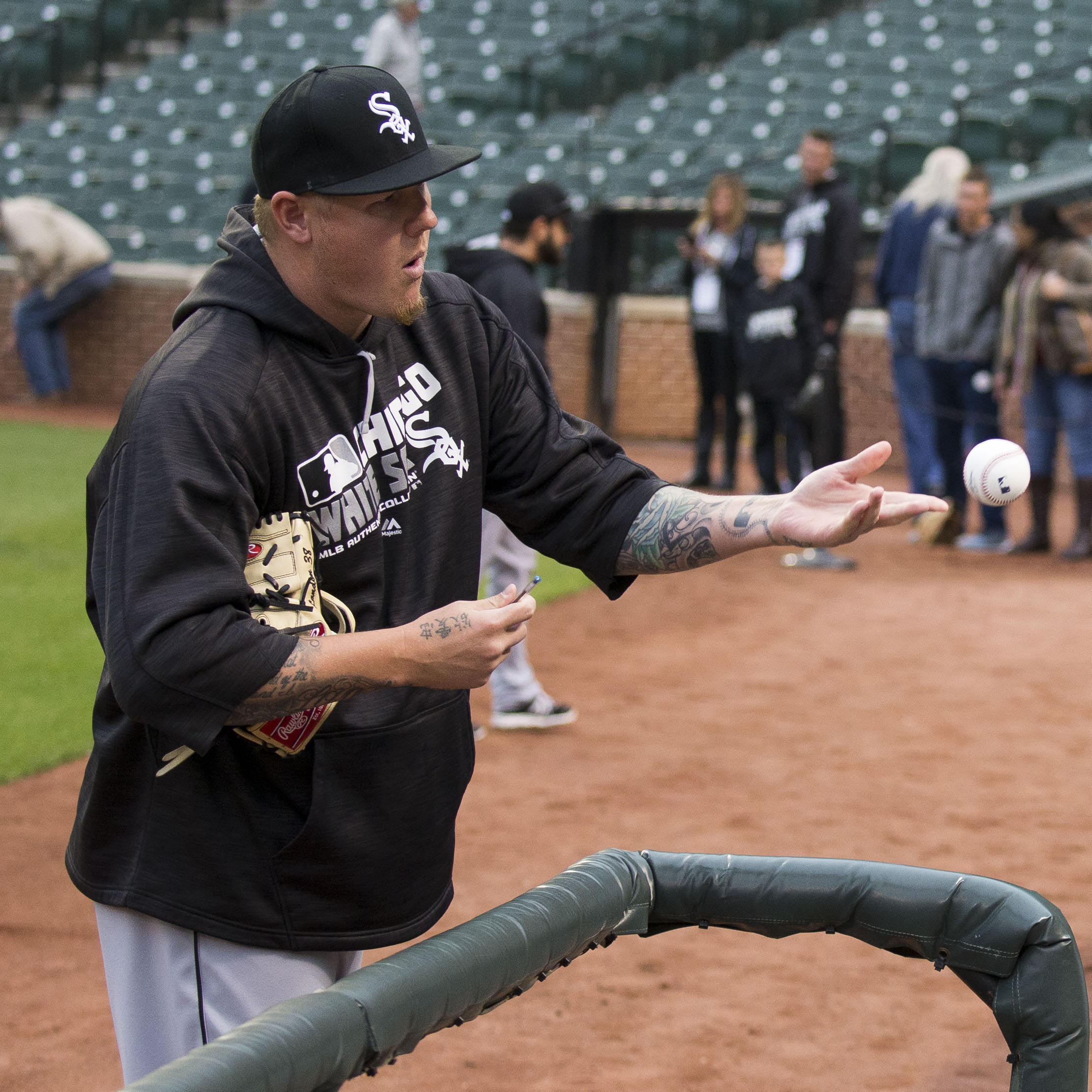
- Latos with the Chicago White Sox in 2016
- Pitcher
- Born: December 9, 1987 (age 38); Alexandria, Virginia, U.S.
- Batted: Right Threw: Right

MLB debut
- July 19, 2009, for the San Diego Padres

Last MLB appearance
- May 2, 2017, for the Toronto Blue Jays

MLB statistics
- Win–loss record: 71–59
- Earned run average: 3.64
- Strikeouts: 1,011
- Stats at Baseball Reference

Teams
- San Diego Padres (2009–2011); Cincinnati Reds (2012–2014); Miami Marlins (2015); Los Angeles Dodgers (2015); Los Angeles Angels of Anaheim (2015); Chicago White Sox (2016); Washington Nationals (2016); Toronto Blue Jays (2017)

Mathew Adam Latos (/ˈleɪtoʊs/ LAY-tohs; born December 9, 1987) is an American former professional baseball pitcher. He played in Major League Baseball (MLB) for the San Diego Padres from 2009 through 2011, the Cincinnati Reds from 2012 through 2014, and the Miami Marlins, Los Angeles Dodgers and Los Angeles Angels of Anaheim in 2015, the Chicago White Sox and Washington Nationals in 2016, and the Toronto Blue Jays in 2017.

Born in Alexandria, Virginia, Latos' family moved to Florida when he was young. He played baseball at Coconut Creek High School, where he became one of the best high school players in the state. Highly regarded for his talent before the 2006 MLB draft, he fell to the 11th round due to questions about his maturity. After pitching at Broward College for a season, he was signed by the San Diego Padres for a $1.25 million bonus. He debuted for the Padres in 2009, and established himself in their starting rotation. The Reds traded four players, including three prospects, to acquire Latos before the 2012 season.

Latos suffered a knee injury in 2014, which reduced his effectiveness. The Marlins traded for Latos before the 2015 season and then traded him to the Dodgers in July 2015. He signed with the White Sox for 2016, but was released during the season, and finished the year with the Nationals. He briefly appeared with the Blue Jays in 2017.

== Early life ==
Latos is the only child born to Lisa and Rich Latos. He is originally from Alexandria, Virginia. When Latos was 12 years old, his grandfather insisted that he play in a baseball tournament rather than stay at his bedside the day he died.

== High school career ==
Latos attended Coconut Creek High School in Coconut Creek, Florida, despite being recruited to attend high schools with more prestigious baseball programs. He was named the ace starting pitcher of the Coconut Creek baseball team's as a freshman. That year, he pitched to a 3–4 win–loss record and a 3.68 earned run average (ERA), with 41 strikeouts and 26 walks in 39 2/3 innings pitched. His fastball reached 88–89 miles per hour (142–143 km/h). He improved his fastball command and velocity as a sophomore, reaching 93 miles per hour (150 km/h) and his statistics improved to a 5–2 record, a 1.23 ERA, 89 strikeouts, and 21 walks in 68 innings.

Heading into his junior year, Latos improved his training regimen and diet. He pitched to a 7–4 record with a 0.76 ERA as a junior with 128 strikeouts and 17 walks in 83 innings. Eleven of his thirteen starts were complete games. Coconut Creek reached the regional quarterfinals, and Latos was named an Aflac All-American and All-Broward County by the South Florida Sun-Sentinel and Miami Herald. By his senior year, Latos could throw his fastball as high as 98 miles per hour (158 km/h). He was an honorable mention by the Florida Sports Writers Association for the All-State team. As a senior, Latos had a 7–3 record with 110 strikeouts and a 0.64 ERA in 69 2/3 innings pitched. He appeared in the Broward County Athletics Association All-Star Game, and was named South Florida Sun-Sentinel's player of the year.

== College career ==
Latos committed to attend the University of Oklahoma to play college baseball for the Oklahoma Sooners baseball team. However, many scouts expected Latos to be a first-round pick in the 2006 Major League Baseball (MLB) Draft. SchoolSports.com ranked Latos the fifth-best high school pitcher available in the 2006 Major League Baseball draft. The San Diego Padres selected Latos in the 11th round (333rd overall). He fell in the draft since his personality made him difficult to handle in high school, as he was considered immature, often yelled at teammates who made errors and reacted poorly when the umpire made a call with which he disagreed.

After the draft, Latos demanded a $3 million signing bonus from the Padres. When the Padres did not meet his demands, Latos enrolled at Broward College, a junior college, to pitch for their baseball team. As the Padres retained the right to sign Latos until the start of the 2007 MLB draft, they sent scout Joe Bochy to observe every start Latos made. Latos had a 10–3 win–loss record and a 2.03 ERA. Feeling that Latos was worth the gamble, the Padres paid Latos $1.25 million a few days before he would have re-entered the draft in 2007.

== Professional career ==
=== Minor leagues ===
Latos started his professional career in 2007, minor league baseball with the Eugene Emeralds, the Padres' Low–A affiliate in the Northwest League. Pitching in 16 games for Eugene, Latos had a 1–4 record and a 3.83 ERA. In 2008, Latos started the season with the Fort Wayne Wizards of the Single–A Midwest League, but missed playing time during the season due to abdominal and shoulder injuries.

The Padres invited Latos to spring training in 2009, but he suffered a minor ankle sprain that limited his appearances. Latos started the 2009 season in Fort Wayne and allowed only one run in four starts. He was then promoted to the San Antonio Missions of the Double–A Texas League. At San Antonio, Latos had a 5–1 win–loss record and threw five perfect innings in his last start for San Antonio on July 9. Between Fort Wayne and San Antonio, Latos had an 8–1 record, a 1.38 ERA, 73 strikeouts, and a .168 batting average against (BAA). The Padres named Latos their Padres Minor League Pitcher of the Month for May. Latos was selected to play in the 2009 All-Star Futures Game, and threw one scoreless inning.

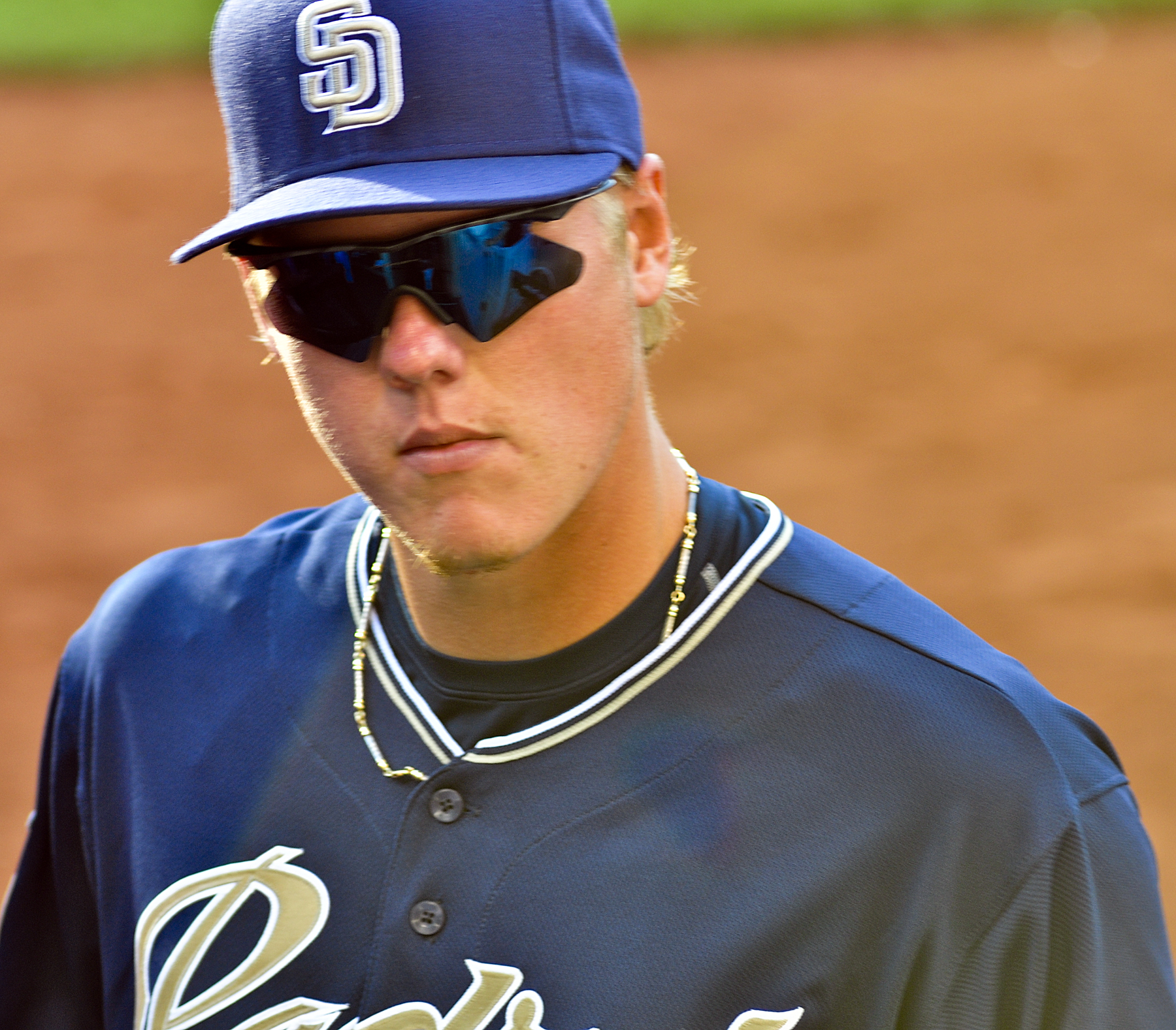
Latos with the San Diego Padres in 2009

=== San Diego Padres ===
The Padres promoted Latos to make his major league debut on July 19, 2009, against the Colorado Rockies. In his major league debut, Latos pitched four innings, allowing three hits and two runs while striking out four, while throwing 75 pitches. He recorded his first major league win on July 24. Latos became the first pitcher in Padres history to win four of his first five career starts. Latos made ten starts for the Padres in 2009, pitching to a 4–5 record and a 4.68 ERA.

On May 13, 2010, Latos threw a complete-game shutout against the division foe San Francisco Giants. The only hit he allowed was an infield single. The Padres won the game 1–0. After posting a 5.47 ERA through May 1, Latos lowered his ERA down to 2.45 right before the All Star Break, also leading the league in BAA and WHIP (.193 and 0.97 respectively). On September 7, 2010, Latos set a major league record with a seven–inning, 10–strikeout performance in a win against the Dodgers. The victory was Latos' 15th consecutive start logging at least five innings and allowing two or fewer earned runs, which was at the time the longest streak in modern baseball history (since 1900) according to the Elias Sports Bureau. The record would be broken by Félix Hernández, who recorded 17 such straight outings during the 2014 season. Previously the mark had been set by Greg Maddux (1993–94) and Mike Scott (1986), who had such streaks lasting 14 starts. On the season, Latos pitched to a 14–10 win–loss record in 31 games started, with a 2.92 (ERA), 1.08 walks plus hits per inning pitched (WHIP), and 189 strikeouts in 184 2/3 innings pitched. He placed eighth in voting for the National League Cy Young Award.

However, Latos lost his last five starts of the 2010 season, culminating with a 3–0 loss to the San Francisco Giants on October 3 that, combined with an Atlanta Braves win, eliminated the Padres from playoff contention. The San Diego Union-Tribune attributed his struggles at the end of the year to fatigue, as his 189 2/3 innings for the season were 66 2/3 more than he pitched in 2009.

Latos started 2011 on the disabled list due to a spring training shoulder injury. He lost his first four starts of the season, extending his losing streak to nine consecutive starts dating back to 2010. The streak tied the longest streak in Padres history, held by Andy Benes and Dennis Rasmussen. Latos had a no-decision in his next start after the bullpen blew a save opportunity, preventing him from earning a win. He lost another decision for a 10-game losing streak that was one less than the club record held by Gary Ross. Latos won on May 15 against the Colorado Rockies to end his losing streak. He ended the 2011 season with a 9–14 record and a 3.47 ERA.

=== Cincinnati Reds ===
After the 2011 season, the Cincinnati Reds were looking for another frontline starter to pair with Johnny Cueto in their starting rotation. On December 17, 2011, the Padres traded Latos to the Reds in exchange for prospects Yonder Alonso, Yasmani Grandal, and Brad Boxberger, along with veteran starting pitcher Edinson Vólquez.

In the last week of June 2012, Latos pitched two complete games. He was named the National League Player of the Week for the week ending July 1. Latos finished the 2012 season with a 14–4 win–loss record a 3.48 ERA. The Reds reached the playoffs, and faced the San Francisco Giants in the 2012 National League Division Series (NLDS). On October 11, 2012, Latos gave up a grand slam to Buster Posey in a 6-run top of the fifth inning in the elimination game of the NLDS. Latos took the loss in this game, as the Reds were eliminated.

The Reds signed Latos to a two-year contract worth $11.5 million for the 2013 and 2014 seasons. Latos had a 21-game streak without a loss, extending from August 2012 to June 2013. He finished the 2013 season with a 14–7 win–loss record and a 3.16 ERA in 210 2/3 innings pitched. Though he suffered an abdominal strain on June 30, he continued to pitch without missing any starts. He revealed the injury after a poor outing against the Pittsburgh Pirates in September. The Reds reached the 2013 National League Wild Card Game, opposing Pittsburgh. Reds' manager Dusty Baker wanted to start Latos for that game, but a bone spur in his elbow prevented him from being available. Baker chose Cueto as his starter. The Reds lost the game, ending their season.

Latos had surgery to remove bone chips from his elbow during the offseason. During spring training in 2014, Latos tore cartilage in his left knee, which was repaired with surgery. His knee had not fully recovered in time for Opening Day of the 2014 season, which he started on the disabled list. He began a rehabilitation assignment with the Louisville Bats of the Class AAA International League on May 26, and made his 2014 season debut with the Reds on June 14. Latos said that he came back at "80–90 percent" effectiveness due to his desire to help his team, but experienced setbacks with his knee during the season. He averaged 90.7 miles per hour (146.0 km/h) on his fastball, down from 92.5 miles per hour (148.9 km/h) during the 2013 season. His last start came on September 7, as he suffered a bone bruise on the elbow of his pitching arm. His 2014 season ended with a 5–5 record and a 3.25 ERA in 16 starts.

=== Miami Marlins ===
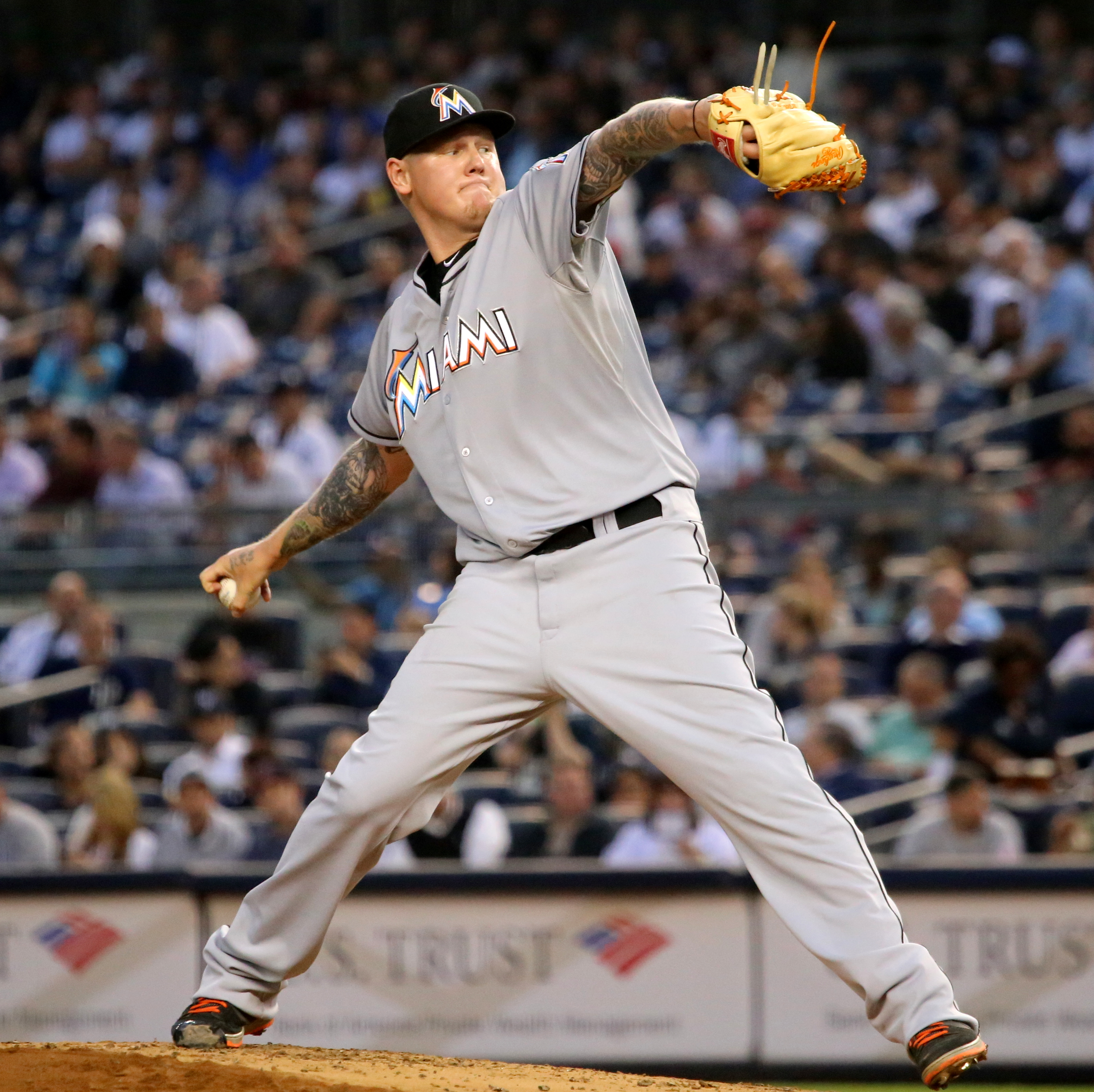
Latos pitching for the Miami Marlins in 2015

With the goal of reducing their payroll, and with Latos eligible for free agency after the 2015 season, the Reds traded Latos to the Miami Marlins in exchange for Anthony DeSclafani and Chad Wallach during the 2014 Winter Meetings. Latos sought a $10.4 million salary for the 2015 season in salary arbitration, but the arbiters sided with the Marlins, who proposed a salary of $9.4 million.

Latos had 90 cubic centimetres (5.5 cu in) of fluid drained from his left knee during spring training. He allowed seven runs in 2/3 of an inning in his first start for Miami, and struggled through knee pain through May. He went on the disabled list after his May 21 start to rest his knee, and returned in mid-June. Latos missed a start in July after a foul ball struck him in his foot while he was sitting in the dugout.

=== Los Angeles Dodgers and Angels ===
On July 30, 2015, in a three-team trade, the Los Angeles Dodgers acquired Latos, Michael Morse, Bronson Arroyo, Alex Wood, Jim Johnson, Luis Avilán, and José Peraza, while the Marlins acquired minor league pitchers Victor Araujo, Jake Brigham, and Kevin Guzman, while the Atlanta Braves received Héctor Olivera, Paco Rodriguez, minor league pitcher Zachary Bird, and a competitive balance draft pick for the 2016 MLB draft. He pitched to a 6.66 ERA in 24 1/3 innings. He lost his starting job due to his poor performance and was designated for assignment on September 17. The Dodgers released Latos on September 25.

On September 28, 2015, Latos signed a contract with the Los Angeles Angels of Anaheim that would allow him to pitch the last week of the season for them. Latos was not eligible to pitch for the Angels in the postseason. He made his first appearance for the Angels as a relief pitcher on September 29. Latos had a 4.91 ERA in 3 2/3 innings pitched for the Angels.

=== Chicago White Sox ===
Latos signed a one-year contract worth $3 million with the Chicago White Sox prior to the 2016 season. Latos pitched to a 0.74 ERA in his first four starts for the White Sox, but then struggled, allowing 29 earned runs in his next 36 innings pitched (7.25 ERA) after April 30. After acquiring James Shields, the White Sox designated Latos for assignment on June 9.

=== Washington Nationals ===
Latos signed a minor league contract with the Washington Nationals on June 29. After making three appearances for the Gulf Coast Nationals of the Rookie-level Gulf Coast League, the Nationals assigned Latos to the Syracuse Chiefs of the International League. He made his Nationals debut on September 4, 2016, against the Mets. He pitched 9 2/3 innings for the Nationals, recording a 6.52 ERA.

=== Toronto Blue Jays ===
On February 16, 2017, Latos signed a minor league contract with the Toronto Blue Jays. After not winning a spot on the Blue Jays' roster in spring training, Latos accepted an assignment to the Buffalo Bisons of the International League. He made two starts for the Bisons, pitching to a 1.00 ERA in nine innings, and the Blue Jays promoted Latos to the major leagues on April 21 after injuries to the team's starting rotation. Latos started three games for the Blue Jays, pitching to a 6.60 ERA and 1.80 WHIP. The Blue Jays designated Latos for assignment on May 5, and outrighted him back to Buffalo on May 8. He was released by the team on May 30.

=== New Jersey Jackals ===
On April 10, 2018, Latos signed with the New Jersey Jackals of the independent Can-Am League. During a game on June 9, Latos threw at a batter after another player collided with his catcher. The batter charged the mound and a brawl ensued, leading to Latos's ejection.

Latos finished the 2018 season with a record of 5-4 and ERA of 3.18 in 29 games pitched (10 games started), accumulating 4 saves. In 76 1/3 innings pitched, Latos allowed only 66 hits, 31 walks, and struck out 87.

On September 3, Latos was the starting first baseman in the Jackals 6–5 win over the Québec Capitales, his first professional game at any position other than pitcher. Latos went 3-for-4 at the plate with two doubles and a run scored. On defense, Latos had eight putouts and was part of a 4-6-3 double play.

Following the conclusion of the season, Latos was released by the Jackals on October 3, 2018.

=== Southern Maryland Blue Crabs ===
On March 28, 2019, Latos signed with the Southern Maryland Blue Crabs of the Atlantic League of Professional Baseball. He became a free agent following the season. In 50 games 51 innings of relief he went 4–5 with a stellar 1.06 ERA with 39 strikeouts and 25 saves.

=== New Jersey Jackals (second stint) ===
On January 29, 2020, Latos signed with the New Jersey Jackals of the Frontier League. On December 14, 2020, Latos had his contract exercised for the 2021 season. He did not appear in a game during the 2020 season.

=== Southern Maryland Blue Crabs (second stint) ===
On March 26, 2021, Latos was traded to the Southern Maryland Blue Crabs of the Atlantic League of Professional Baseball in exchange for a player to be named later. In 43 appearances for Southern Maryland, he compiled a 2–5 record and 2.76 ERA with 46 strikeouts and 24 saves across 42 1/3 innings pitched. Latos became a free agent following the season.

On March 8, 2022, Latos re-signed with the Blue Crabs. He made 39 appearances for the team during the season, registering a 4–3 record and 4.46 ERA with 40 strikeouts and 25 saves over 38 1/3 innings of work. Latos became a free agent following the season.

== Coaching career ==
On February 26, 2024, Latos was announced as the bench coach for the Southern Maryland Blue Crabs of the Atlantic League of Professional Baseball.

== Pitching style ==
Latos throws five pitches. He throws a four-seam fastball (91–96 miles per hour (146–154 km/h)), a two-seam fastball (90–94 miles per hour (145–151 km/h)), a slider (84–87 miles per hour (135–140 km/h)), a curveball (78–82 miles per hour (126–132 km/h)), and a changeup (82–85 miles per hour (132–137 km/h)). He mostly relies on his four-seamer and slider against right-handed hitters while adding considerable variety against lefties. The 42% whiff rate on his slider is one of the best among major league starters.

Latos is 6 feet 6 inches (1.98 m) tall and uses an over-the-top delivery. Latos has one of the highest delivery points in baseball. Latos has compiled good strikeout totals in his career as a starter, finishing in the NL's top 10 in strikeouts per 9 innings pitched rate twice.

== Personal life ==
Latos was married in 2010 and divorced in 2017. He has a son born in 2014.

In September 2018, Latos received a restraining order that required him to stay away from his ex-girlfriend. The order was sought on claims of threats, and physical and emotional abuse.

Latos honored his grandfather by writing his initials on the pitching mound, and with a tattoo of his grandfather's initials. He enjoys drawing, especially airbrushing, and stated a desire to work on tattoos. Latos has many tattoos, and was described as "the righthanded tattoo canvas."
