= Wayne Krivsky =

American professional baseball executive (born 1954)

- Born: July 28, 1954 (age 72); Niagara Falls, New York, U.S.
- Occupation: Baseball executive

Wayne Krivsky (born July 28, 1954) is an American professional baseball executive. The former general manager of the Cincinnati Reds, serving from February 2006 until April 2008, and was a special assistant to the GM and a Major League scout for the Minnesota Twins. It was his second tour of duty with the Twins, where he was assistant general manager in 1999–2005.

== Biography ==
Wayne Krivsky attended Duke University, where he played baseball for three years. He graduated in 1976 with a degree in management science. Since college, he has spent his entire career in professional baseball management from front office executive to scouting. His first major league job was working in the ticket department of the Texas Rangers. He later became a scout and assistant GM of the Rangers (1984–94).

When businessman Bob Castellini purchased majority ownership of the Reds, he hired Krivsky as general manager. The most prominent transactions Krivsky made were the acquisition of Boston right-handed pitcher Bronson Arroyo for outfielder Wily Mo Peña. Arroyo made the All-Star team his first year in Cincinnati. Another significant Krivsky trade brought Cleveland Indians infielder Brandon Phillips to the Reds for a player to be named later. Phillips has been a Gold Glove winner at Second Base and was an All Star in 2010. The most controversial trade of Krivsky's tenure was on July 13, 2006, and sent outfielder Austin Kearns, shortstop Felipe López, and right-hander Ryan Wagner to the Washington Nationals for right-hander Gary Majewski, left-hander Bill Bray, shortstop Royce Clayton and minor-leaguers Brendan Harris and Daryl Thompson. Jim Bowden, the Nationals' general manager, held that capacity with the Reds from 1992-2003. On August 7, 2006, Majewski was revealed to have a tired arm, and had received a cortisone shot prior to the trade. He was placed on the 15-day Disabled list and the Reds filed a grievance; however, the league did not act upon it and was later dropped by the Reds after Walt Jocketty took over as general manager. On April 23, 2008, 21 games into the season, Krivsky was fired as general manager and replaced by Walt Jocketty.

In June 2008 Krivsky was hired by the New York Mets as a Major League Scout. In November 2008 the Orioles hired him as special assistant to the president of baseball operations. His duties included scouting, contracts and other administration responsibilities. He played a key role in the trade of catcher Ramón Hernández to Krivsky's former team, the Reds, in return for utility player Ryan Freel.

In November 2009 the Mets hired Krivsky as special assistant to the president of baseball operations. In 2011, Krivsky was hired by the Twins, as a special assistant to the GM.

Preceded by Dan O'Brien	Cincinnati Reds General Manager; 2006–2008	Succeeded by Walt Jocketty
