= 2008 Cincinnati Reds season =

2008 Cincinnati Reds
- League: National League
- Division: Central
- Ballpark: Great American Ball Park
- City: Cincinnati
- Record: 74–88 (.457)
- Divisional place: 5th
- Owners: Robert Castellini
- General managers: Wayne Krivsky, Walt Jocketty
- Managers: Dusty Baker
- Television: FSN Ohio (George Grande, Thom Brennaman, Chris Welsh)
- Radio: WLW (700 AM); Cincinnati Bell Reds Radio Network (Marty Brennaman, Thom Brennaman, Jeff Brantley, Jim Kelch)
- Stats: ESPN.com; Baseball Reference

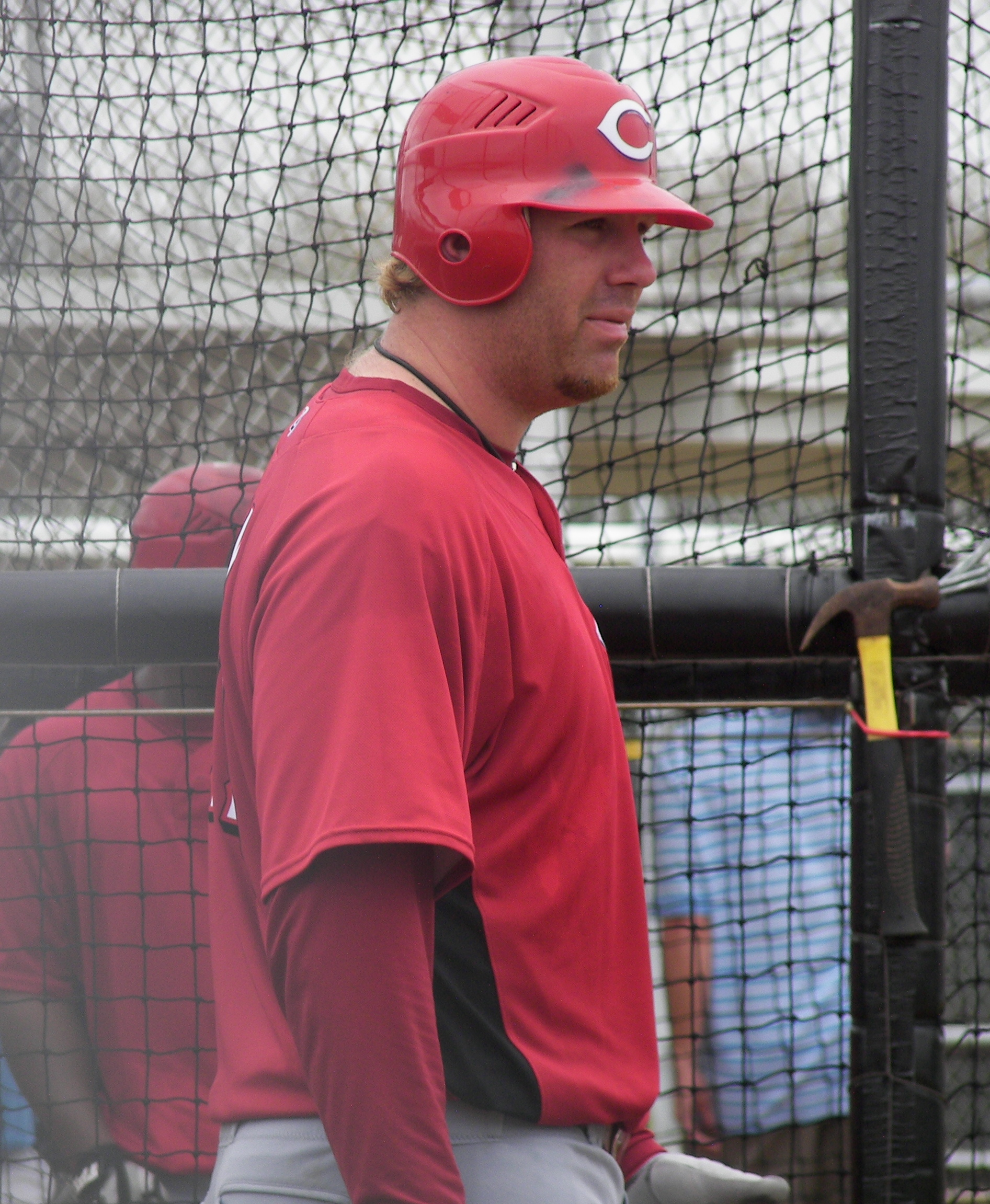
Cincinnati Reds outfielder Adam Dunn during a Spring Training workout outside Ed Smith Stadium in Sarasota, Florida, 2008

The 2008 Cincinnati Reds season was the 139th season for the franchise in Major League Baseball, and their sixth at Great American Ball Park in Cincinnati. The Reds play in the National League Central; their divisional foes were the Chicago Cubs, St. Louis Cardinals, Milwaukee Brewers, Houston Astros, and Pittsburgh Pirates. The Cubs were the defending champions. The Reds did not make the playoffs until 2010 season, with their last playoff appearance in 1995.

The 2008 season was manager Dusty Baker's first with the Reds; the 19-year major league veteran outfielder from 1968 to 1986 with the Atlanta Braves, Los Angeles Dodgers, San Francisco Giants, and Oakland Athletics, previously managed the San Francisco Giants from 1993 to 2002 and the Chicago Cubs from 2003 to 2006. He took the entirety of 2007 off. Baker replaced Pete Mackanin, who was named the interim manager on July 1, 2007, after Jerry Narron, coincidentally hired as an interim manager himself, was fired.

Baker was the club's first-ever African American manager.

The season was dedicated to a number of people who died prior to the beginning of the season. Primarily, former Reds left-handed pitcher and longtime announcer Joe Nuxhall, affectionately known to fans as "The Ol' Lefthander", who died on November 15, 2007, of cancer. A patch that said "NUXY" was worn on Reds uniforms.

Other Reds figures who passed were Sheldon "Chief" Bender, a former major league pitcher who developed the Reds' minor league farm system in the late 1960s and into the 1970s. Bender died on February 27, 2008. He worked with general manager Bob Howsam, who had died eight days earlier, to develop the Reds into 1970s powerhouse team nicknamed "The Big Red Machine".

Just 21 games into the 2008 season, the Reds fired 3rd year General Manager Wayne Krivsky and replaced him with former St. Louis Cardinals General Manager Walt Jocketty. The Reds had a 9–12 record, tied for 4th in the NL Central standings at the time of the firing. It was the team's worst start since the 2003 season. The Reds again stirred up controversy in Cincinnati in late July and early August by first trading right fielder Ken Griffey Jr., who a month earlier had hit his 600th home run, to the Chicago White Sox at the trade deadline. On their next off day they sent popular left fielder Adam Dunn to the Arizona Diamondbacks for two minor leaguers and pitcher Micah Owings.

== Regular season ==
=== Season standings ===
NL Central
Team	W	L	Pct.	GB	Home	Road
Chicago Cubs	97	64	.602	—	55‍–‍26	42‍–‍38
Milwaukee Brewers	90	72	.556	7½	49‍–‍32	41‍–‍40
Houston Astros	86	75	.534	11	47‍–‍33	39‍–‍42
St. Louis Cardinals	86	76	.531	11½	46‍–‍35	40‍–‍41
Cincinnati Reds	74	88	.457	23½	43‍–‍38	31‍–‍50
Pittsburgh Pirates	67	95	.414	30½	39‍–‍42	28‍–‍53

=== Record vs. opponents ===
2008 National League record Source: MLB Standings Grid – 2008
Team	AZ	ATL	CHC	CIN	COL	FLA	HOU	LAD	MIL	NYM	PHI	PIT	SD	SF	STL	WAS	AL
Arizona	–	3–5	2–4	2–4	15–3	2–7	4–2	8–10	2–5	3–3	3–4	4–3	10–8	11–7	3–4	4–2	6–9
Atlanta	5–3	–	0–6	3–3	4–3	10–8	3–3	4–2	3–6	11–7	4–14	2–5	5–1	2–5	2–5	6–12	8–7
Chicago	4–2	6–0	–	8–7	5–1	4–3	8–9	5–2	9–7	4–2	3–4	14–4	5–2	4–3	9–6	3–3	6–9
Cincinnati	4–2	3–3	7–8	–	1–5	6–2	3–12	1–7	10–8	3–4	3–5	6–9	4–3	5–1	5–10	4–3	9–6
Colorado	3–15	3–4	1–5	5–1	–	5–3	3–3	8–10	4–3	3–6	0–5	5–2	9–9	11–7	3–4	4–3	7–8
Florida	7–2	8–10	3–4	2–6	3–5	–	4–2	3–4	5–1	8–10	10–8	3–2	4–2	3–3	2–5	14–3	5–10
Houston	2–4	3–3	9–8	12–3	3–3	2–4	–	4–3	7–8	5–2	3–4	8–8	3–3	7–1	7–8	4–2	7–11
Los Angeles	10–8	2–4	2–5	7–1	10–8	4–3	3–4	–	4–2	3–4	4–4	5–2	11–7	9–9	2–4	3–3	5–10
Milwaukee	5–2	6–3	7–9	8–10	3–4	1–5	8–7	2–4	–	2–4	1–5	14–1	4–3	6–0	10–5	6–2	7–8
New York	3–3	7–11	2–4	4–3	6–3	10–8	2–5	4–3	4–2	–	11–7	4–3	2–5	5–1	4–3	12–6	9–6
Philadelphia	4–3	14–4	4–3	5–3	5–0	8–10	4–3	4–4	5–1	7–11	–	4–2	4–2	3–3	5–4	12–6	4–11
Pittsburgh	3–4	5–2	4–14	9–6	2–5	2–3	8–8	2–5	1–14	3–4	2–4	–	3–4	4–2	10–7	3–4	6–9
San Diego	8–10	1–5	2–5	3–4	9–9	2–4	3–3	7–11	3–4	5–2	2–4	4–3	–	5–13	1–6	5–1	3–15
San Francisco	7–11	5–2	3–4	1–5	7–11	3–3	1–7	9–9	0–6	1–5	3–3	2–4	13–5	–	4–3	7–0	6–12
St. Louis	4–3	5–2	6–9	10–5	4–3	5–2	8–7	4–2	5–10	3–4	4–5	7–10	6–1	3–4	–	5–1	7–8
Washington	2–4	12–6	3–3	3–4	3–4	3–14	2–4	3–3	2–6	6–12	6–12	4–3	1–5	0–7	1–5	–	8–10

=== Roster ===
2008 Cincinnati Reds
Roster
Pitchers: 64 Jon Adkins; 41 Jeremy Affeldt; 61 Bronson Arroyo; 34 Homer Bailey; 31 Matt Belisle; 45 Bill Bray; 51 Jared Burton; 56 Todd Coffey; 48 Francisco Cordero; 47 Johnny Cueto; 33 Josh Fogg; 39 Aaron Harang; 52 Daniel Ray Herrera; 57 Mike Lincoln; 38 Gary Majewski; 40 Nick Masset; 50 Kent Mercker; 63 Adam Pettyjohn; 58 Ramón Ramírez; 65 Josh Roenicke; 53 Daryl Thompson; 36 Edinson Vólquez; 25 David Weathers	Catchers: 9 Paul Bako; 29 Ryan Hanigan; 26 David Ross; 17 Javier Valentín; Infielders: 7 Juan Castro; 28 Edwin Encarnación; 15 Jerry Hairston Jr.; 21 Scott Hatteberg; 7 Paul Janish; 27 Jeff Keppinger; 46 Andy Phillips; 4 Brandon Phillips; 62 Danny Richar; 60 Adam Rosales; 19 Joey Votto	Outfielders: 32 Jay Bruce; 54 Jolbert Cabrera; 26 Wilkin Castillo; 21 Chris Dickerson; 44 Adam Dunn; 6 Ryan Freel; 3 Ken Griffey Jr.; 30 Norris Hopper; 23 Corey Patterson; Other batters: 56 Micah Owings	Manager: 12 Dusty Baker; Coaches: 55 Mark Berry (third base); 22 Billy Hatcher (first base); 49 Brook Jacoby (hitting); 59 Juan López (bullpen); 43 Dick Pole (pitching); 35 Chris Speier (bench)

=== 2008 game log ===
The following is the Reds' 2008 season game log.

2008 game log
March

#	Date	Opponent	Score	Win	Loss	Save	Attendance	Record
1	March 31	Diamondbacks	4–2	Webb (1–0)	Harang (0–1)	Lyon (1)	42,498	0–1

April

#	Date	Opponent	Score	Win	Loss	Save	Attendance	Record
2	April 2	Diamondbacks	6–5	Affeldt (1–0)	Lyon (0–1)		14,016	1–1
3	April 3	Diamondbacks	3–2	Cueto (1–0)	Davis (0–1)	Cordero (1)	11,987	2–1
4	April 4	Phillies	8–4	Kendrick (1–0)	Fogg (0–1)		17,905	2–2
5	April 5	Phillies	4–3	Cordero (1–0)	Durbin (0–1)		23,069	3–2
6	April 6	Phillies	8–2	Vólquez (1–0)	Myers (0–1)		26,566	4–2
7	April 7	Phillies	5–3	Hamels (1–1)	Arroyo (0–1)	Lidge (1)	14,674	4–3
8	April 8	@ Brewers	3 – 2 (10)	Torres (1–0)	Weathers (0–1)		27,717	4–4
9	April 9	@ Brewers	12–4	Fogg (1–1)	Bush (0–2)		31,313	5–4
10	April 10	@ Brewers	4–1	Harang (1–1)	Villanueva (1–1)	Cordero (2)	25,023	6–4
11	April 11	@ Pirates	1–0	Grabow (1–0)	Burton (0–1)	Capps (2)	13,603	6–5
12	April 12	@ Pirates	4–3	Snell (2–0)	Lincoln (0–1)	Capps (3)	18,906	6–6
13	April 13	@ Pirates	9–1	Gorzelanny (1–1)	Cueto (1–1)		11,201	6–7
14	April 15	@ Cubs	9–5	Dempster (2–0)	Harang (1–2)		39,130	6–8
15	April 16	@ Cubs	12–3	Zambrano (2–1)	Fogg (1–2)		40,099	6–9
16	April 17	@ Cubs	9–2	Vólquez (2–0)	Lilly (0–3)		39,534	7–9
17	April 18	Brewers	5–2	Sheets (3–0)	Arroyo (0–2)	Gagné (5)	32,629	7–10
18	April 19	Brewers	5 – 3 (10)	Mota (1–0)	Weathers (0–2)	Gagné (6)	26,410	7–11
19	April 20	Brewers	4 – 3 (10)	Burton (1–1)	Gagné (1–1)		26,902	8–11
20	April 21	Dodgers	9–3	Penny (3–2)	Belisle (0–1)		14,446	8–12
21	April 22	Dodgers	8–1	Vólquez (3–0)	Kuo (0–1)		14,763	9–12
22	April 23	Astros	9–3	Sampson (1–2)	Arroyo (0–3)		16,017	9–13
23	April 24	Astros	5–3	Cassel (1–0)	Cueto (1–2)	Valverde (3)	17,403	9–14
24	April 25	@ Giants	3–1	Sánchez (2–1)	Harang (1–3)	Wilson (8)	34,657	9–15
25	April 26	@ Giants	10–9	Belisle (1–1)	Hennessy (1–1)	Cordero (3)	34,215	10–15
26	April 27	@ Giants	10–1	Vólquez (4–0)	Zito (0–6)		39,050	11–15
27	April 28	@ Cardinals	4–3	Arroyo (1–3)	Wellemeyer (2–1)	Cordero (4)	37,229	12–15
28	April 29	@ Cardinals	7–2	Piñeiro (2–2)	Cueto (1–3)		35,356	12–16
29	April 30	@ Cardinals	5–2	Looper (4–1)	Harang (1–4)	Isringhausen (9)	40,629	12–17

May

#	Date	Opponent	Score	Win	Loss	Save	Attendance	Record
30	May 2	@ Braves	2–0	Hudson (4–2)	Vólquez (4–1)		32,057	12–18
31	May 3	@ Braves	9–1	Reyes (1–0)	Belisle (1–2)		37,969	12–19
32	May 4	@ Braves	14–7	Ring (1–0)	Arroyo (1–4)		33,750	12–20
33	May 5	Cubs	5–3	Cueto (2–3)	Dempster (4–1)	Cordero (5)	20,289	13–20
34	May 6	Cubs	3–0	Zambrano (5–1)	Harang (1–5)	Wood (5)	21,153	13–21
35	May 7	Cubs	9–0	Vólquez (5–1)	Lieber (2–2)		28,418	14–21
—	May 9	@ Mets	Postponed (rain) Rescheduled for May 10					
36	May 10	@ Mets	12–6	Santana (4–2)	Belisle (1–3)		55,186	14–22
37	May 10	@ Mets	7–1	Arroyo (2–4)	Pelfrey (2–3)		47,673	15–22
38	May 11	@ Mets	8–3	Pérez (3–3)	Cueto (2–4)		49,264	15–23
39	May 12	Marlins	8–7	Harang (2–5)	Tankersley (0–1)	Cordero (6)	15,233	16–23
40	May 13	Marlins	5–3	Vólquez (6–1)	Hendrickson (5–2)	Cordero (7)	14,015	17–23
41	May 14	Marlins	7 – 6 (10)	Burton (2–1)	Pinto (1–2)		12,756	18–23
-	May 15	Marlins	Postponed (rain)					
42	May 16	Indians †	4–3	Weathers (1–2)	Lewis (0–2)	Cordero (8)	33,433	19–23
43	May 17	Indians †	4–2	Bray (1–0)	Kobayashi (1–2)		42,023	20–23
44	May 18	Indians †	6–4	Vólquez (7–1)	Lee (6–1)	Cordero (9)	34,612	21–23
45	May 19	@ Dodgers	6–5	Saito (2–1)	Weathers (1–3)		34,669	21–24
46	May 20	@ Dodgers	4–1	Billingsley (4–5)	Belisle (1–4)	Saito (7)	34,306	21–25
47	May 21	@ Dodgers	5–2	Kuroda (2–3)	Cueto (2–5)	Saito (8)	33,224	21–26
48	May 22	@ Padres	8–2	Wolf (3–4)	Harang (2–6)		22,047	21–27
49	May 23	@ Padres	3–2	Weathers (2–3)	Hoffman (0–3)	Cordero (10)	26,422	22–27
50	May 24	@ Padres	7–2	Arroyo (3–4)	Ledezma (0–2)		27,499	23–27
51	May 25	@ Padres	12 – 9 (18)	Banks (1–0)	Vólquez (7–2)		36,508	23–28
52	May 27	Pirates	9–6	Cueto (3–5)	Snell (2–4)	Cordero (11)	17,694	24–28
53	May 28	Pirates	9–1	Arroyo (4–4)	Gorzelanny (4–5)		15,797	25–28
54	May 29	Pirates	7–2	Dumatrait (2–2)	Harang (2–7)		18,142	25–29
55	May 30	Braves	3 – 2 (11)	Mercker (1–0)	Ring (1–1)		37,015	26–29
56	May 31	Braves	8 – 7 (10)	Cordero (2–0)	Acosta (3–2)		38,585	27–29

June

#	Date	Opponent	Score	Win	Loss	Save	Attendance	Record
57	June 1	Braves	6–2	Cueto (4–5)	Hudson (7–4)		35,942	28–29
58	June 2	@ Phillies	5–4	Kendrick (5–2)	Arroyo (4–5)	Lidge (14)	38,530	28–30
59	June 3	@ Phillies	3–2	Eaton (2–3)	Harang (2–8)	Lidge (15)	45,096	28–31
60	June 4	@ Phillies	2–0	Vólquez (8–2)	Myers (3–7)	Cordero (12)	45,223	29–31
61	June 5	@ Phillies	5–0	Hamels (6–4)	Bailey (0–1)		45,492	29–32
62	June 6	@ Marlins	11–3	Cueto (5–5)	Miller (4–5)		16,084	30–32
63	June 7	@ Marlins	8–7	Badenhop (2–3)	Cordero (2–1)		25,289	30–33
64	June 8	@ Marlins	9–2	Tucker (1–0)	Harang (2–9)		12,444	30–34
65	June 9	@ Marlins	9–4	Vólquez (9–2)	Hendrickson (7–4)		16,003	31–34
66	June 10	Cardinals	7–2	Boggs (1–0)	Bailey (0–2)		34,234	31–35
67	June 11	Cardinals	10–0	Looper (8–5)	Cueto (5–6)		19,851	31–36
68	June 12	Cardinals	6–2	Burton (3–1)	Worrell (0–1)		22,121	32–36
69	June 13	Red Sox †	3–1	Harang (3–9)	Masterson (3–1)	Cordero (13)	38,855	33–36
70	June 14	Red Sox †	6 – 4 (10)	Papelbon (3–2)	Lincoln (0–2)	Hansen (1)	40,947	33–37
71	June 15	Red Sox †	9–0	Beckett (7–4)	Bailey (0–3)		39,958	33–38
72	June 17	Dodgers	3–1	Billingsley (5–7)	Cueto (5–7)	Saito (9)	26,906	33–39
73	June 18	Dodgers	6–1	Lowe (5–6)	Arroyo (4–6)		20,055	33–40
74	June 19	Dodgers	7–4	Stults (1–0)	Harang (3–10)	Saito (10)	30,136	33–41
75	June 20	@ Yankees †	4–2	Vólquez (10–2)	Mussina (10–5)	Cordero (14)	53,421	34–41
76	June 21	@ Yankees †	6–0	Bray (2–0)	Giese (1–2)		54,509	35–41
77	June 22	@ Yankees †	4–1	Pettitte (8–5)	Cueto (5–8)	Rivera (21)	54,234	35–42
78	June 24	@ Blue Jays †	14–1	Burnett (7–7)	Arroyo (4–7)		28,153	35–43
79	June 25	@ Blue Jays †	6–5	Burton (4–1)	Wolfe (0–2)	Cordero (15)	25,437	36–43
80	June 26	@ Blue Jays †	7–1	Litsch (8–4)	Vólquez (10–3)		25,129	36–44
81	June 27	@ Indians †	6–0	Sabathia (6–8)	Thompson (0–1)		34,844	36–45
82	June 28	@ Indians †	5–0	Cueto (6–8)	Byrd (3–9)		39,506	37–45
83	June 29	@ Indians †	9–5	Arroyo (5–7)	Laffey (4–5)		37,079	38–45
84	June 30	Pirates	4–3	Cordero (3–1)	Capps (1–3)		20,745	39–45

July

#	Date	Opponent	Score	Win	Loss	Save	Attendance	Record
85	July 1	Pirates	6–5 (11)	Capps (2–3)	Weathers (2–4)	Sánchez (1)	19,345	39–46
86	July 2	Pirates	9–5	Bautista (1–1)	Thompson (0–2)		16,890	39–47
87	July 3	Nationals	5–3	Cueto (7–8)	Colomé (2–2)	Cordero (16)	23,259	40–47
88	July 4	Nationals	3–0	Arroyo (6–7)	Bergmann (1–6)	Cordero (17)	22,626	41–47
89	July 5	Nationals	3–2	Cordero (4–1)	Hanrahan (5–3)		37,121	42–47
90	July 6	Nationals	6–5	Vólquez (11–3)	Balester (1–1)	Cordero (18)	28,814	43–47
91	July 8	@ Cubs	7–3	Dempster (10–3)	Harang (3–11)		41,360	43–48
92	July 9	@ Cubs	5–1	Zambrano (10–3)	Cueto (7–9)	Wood (23)	41,605	43–49
93	July 10	@ Cubs	12–7	Arroyo (7–7)	Lilly (9–6)		41,459	44–49
94	July 11	@ Brewers	6–5	Lincoln (1–2)	Shouse (3–1)	Cordero (19)	41,229	45–49
95	July 12	@ Brewers	8–2	Vólquez (12–3)	McClung (5–5)		43,556	46–49
96	July 13	@ Brewers	3–2	Sabathia (8–8)	Weathers (2–5)		42,108	46–50
97	July 17	Mets	10–8	Sánchez (4–1)	Cordero (4–2)	Wagner (23)	23,681	46–51
98	July 18	Mets	5–2	Arroyo (8–7)	Maine (8–7)	Cordero (20)	31,922	47–51
99	July 19	Mets	7–2	Fogg (2–2)	Pérez (6–6)		41,959	48–51
100	July 20	Mets	7–5	Sánchez (5–1)	Bray (2–1)	Wagner (24)	31,195	48–52
101	July 21	Padres	6–4	Hensley (1–0)	Cordero (4–3)	Hoffman (18)	18,177	48–53
102	July 22	Padres	4 – 3 (11)	Majewski (1–0)	Corey (1–3)		21,233	49–53
103	July 23	Padres	9–5	Arroyo (9–7)	Meredith (0–3)	Cordero (21)	22,970	50–53
104	July 25	Rockies	7–2	Cook (13–6)	Vólquez (12–4)		27,501	50–54
105	July 26	Rockies	5–1	de la Rosa (5–5)	Bailey (0–4)		33,981	50–55
106	July 27	Rockies	11–0	Jiménez (7–9)	Fogg (2–3)		28,246	50–56
107	July 28	@ Astros	5–4	Oswalt (8–8)	Cueto (7–10)	Valverde (27)	31,783	50–57
108	July 29	@ Astros	6–2	Moehler (6–4)	Arroyo (9–8)	Wright (1)	34,015	50–58
109	July 30	@ Astros	9–5	Vólquez (13–4)	Rodríguez (6–4)		30,272	51–58

August

#	Date	Opponent	Score	Win	Loss	Save	Attendance	Record
110	August 1	@ Nationals	5–2	Pérez (4–8)	Bailey (0–5)		30,572	51–59
111	August 2	@ Nationals	10–6	Manning (1–2)	Lincoln (1–3)		30,970	51–60
112	August 3	@ Nationals	4–2	Balester (2–3)	Cueto (7–11)	Hanrahan (1)	32,939	51–61
113	August 4	Brewers	6–3	Arroyo (10–8)	Parra (9–5)	Cordero (22)	24,706	52–61
114	August 5	Brewers	8–1	Bush (6–9)	Vólquez		24,739	52–62
115	August 6	Brewers	6–3	Suppan (7–7)	Bailey (0–6)	Torres (22)	26,602	52–63
116	August 7	Astros	7–4	Oswalt (9–8)	Josh Fogg (2–4)		27,378	52–64
117	August 8	Astros	9 – 5 (10)	Sampson (6–4)	Cordero (4–4)		25,652	52–65
118	August 9	Astros	3–1	Moehler (8–4)	Arroyo (10–9)	Valverde (28)	26,044	52–66
119	August 10	Astros	13–4	Rodríguez (7–4)	Harang (3–12)		30,789	52–67
120	August 12	@ Pirates	5–1	Vólquez (14–5)	Karstens (2–1)		23.686	53–67
121	August 13	@ Pirates	5–2	Maholm (8–7)	Fogg (2–5)	Grabow (3)	15,787	53–68
122	August 14	@ Pirates	3–1	Cueto (8–11)	Snell (4–10)	Cordero (23)	35,439	54–68
123	August 15	Cardinals	5–3	Thompson (5–2)	Arroyo (10–10)	Perez (4)	26,234	54–69
124	August 16	Cardinals	9–3	Piñeiro (6–5)	Harang (3–13)		30,713	54–70
125	August 17	Cardinals	7–3	Vólquez (15–5)	Lohse (13–10)		37,468	55–70
126	August 19	@ Cubs	5–0	Harden (3–1)	Cueto (8–12)		41,208	55–71
127	August 20	@ Cubs	2–1	Arroyo (11–10)	Lilly (12–7)		40,509	56–71
128	August 21	@ Cubs	3–2	Zambrano (13–5)	Fogg (2–6)	Wood (26)	40,730	56–72
129	August 22	@ Rockies	8–5	Harang (4–13)	Hernández (11–10)	Cordero (25)	30,337	57–72
130	August 23	@ Rockies	7–6	Vizcaíno (1–0)	Lincoln (1–4)	Fuentes (25)	42,282	57–73
131	August 24	@ Rockies	4–3 (12)	Speier (2–1)	Lincoln (1–5)		31,173	57–74
132	August 26	@Astros	2–1	Arroyo (12–10)	Geary (2–3)		30,395	58–74
133	August 27	@ Astros	4–1	Oswalt (12–9)	Fogg (2–7)	Valverde (34)	30,741	58–75
134	August 28	@ Astros	3–2	Backe (9–12)	Harang (4–14)	Valverde (35)	30,028	58–76
135	August 29	Giants	11–7	Vólquez (16–5)	Zito (8–16)		25,445	59–76
136	August 30	Giants	7–6	Lincoln (2–5)	Taschner (3–2)	Cordero (26)	21,729	60–76
137	August 31	Giants	9–3	Arroyo (13–10)	Cain (8–11)		26,519	61–76

September

#	Date	Opponent	Score	Win	Loss	Save	Attendance	Record
138	September 2	Pirates	3–2	Snell (6–10)	Harang (4–15)	Capps (18)	18,024	61–77
139	September 3	Pirates	6–5	Yates (5–3)	Affeldt (1–1)	Capps (19)	18,561	61–78
140	September 4	Pirates	8–6	Masset (2–0)	Hansen (1–6)	Cordero (27)	20,626	62–78
141	September 5	Cubs	10–2	Arroyo (14–10)	Lilly (13–9)		31,213	63–78
142	September 6	Cubs	14–9	Marquis (10–8)	Cueto (8–13)		41,204	63–79
143	September 7	Cubs	4–3	Cordero (5–4)	Wood (4–4)		37,540	64–79
144	September 8	@ Brewers	5–4	Burton (5–1)	Torres (6–5)	Cordero (28)	30,867	65–79
145	September 9	@ Brewers	5–4	Adkins (1–0)	McClung (5–6)	Cordero (29)	30,312	66–79
146	September 10	@ Brewers	4–3	Mota (5–5)	Weathers (2–6)	Torres (27)	30,124	66–80
147	September 12	@ Diamondbacks	3–2	Webb (20–7)	Harang (4–16)	Qualls (3)	29,046	66–81
148	September 13	@ Diamondbacks	3–2	Weathers (3–6)	Peña (1–2)	Cordero (30)	45,075	67–81
149	September 14	@ Diamondbacks	2–1	Weathers (4–6)	Rauch (4–8)	Cordero (31)	27,297	68–81
150	September 16	Cardinals	7–2	Arroyo (15–10)	Looper (12–13)		19,708	69–81
151	September 17	Cardinals	3–0	Harang (5–16)	Wellemeyer (12–8)		14,850	70–81
152	September 18	Cardinals	5–4	Lohse (14–6)	Vólquez (16–6)	Motte (1)	14,041	70–82
153	September 19	Brewers	11–2	Ramírez (1–0)	Suppan (10–10)		20,855	71–82
154	September 20	Brewers	4–3	Cueto (9–13)	Sabathia (9–2)	Cordero (32)	24,440	72–82
155	September 21	Brewers	8–1	Coffey (1–0)	Arroyo (15–11)		22,624	72–83
156	September 22	Marlins	7–5	Harang (6–16)	Miller (6–10)	Cordero (33)	13,565	73–83
157	September 23	@ Astros	2–1	Vólquez (17–6)	Rodríguez (8–7)	Cordero (34)	27,361	74–83
158	September 24	@ Astros	5–0	Wolf (12–12)	Ramírez (1–1)		26,103	74–84
159	September 25	@ Astros	8–6	Roy Oswalt (17–10)	Cueto (9–14)	Valverde (43)	31,204	74–85
160	September 26	@ Cardinals	7–6	Franklin (6–6)	Bray (2–2)		44,709	74–86
161	September 27	@ Cardinals	8–5	Wellemeyer (13–9)	Harang (6–17)		43,682	74–87
162	September 28	@ Cardinals	11–4	Thompson (6–3)	Pettyjohn (0–1)		43,300	74–88

== Player stats ==
=== Batting ===
Note: G = Games played; AB = At bats; R = Runs; H = Hits; HR = Home runs; RBI = Runs batted in; SB = Stolen bases; AVG = Batting average

Player	G	AB	R	H	HR	RBI	SB	AVG
Bako, Paul	99	299	30	65	6	35	0	.217
Bruce, Jay	108	413	63	105	21	52	4	.254
Cabrera, Jolbert	48	115	17	29	3	12	2	.252
Castillo, Wilkin	18	32	6	9	0	1	0	.281
Castro, Juan	7	10	1	0	0	0	0	.000
Dickerson, Chris	31	102	20	31	6	15	5	.304
Dunn, Adam	114	373	58	87	32	74	1	.233
Encarnación, Edwin	146	506	75	127	26	68	1	.251
Freel, Ryan	48	131	17	39	0	10	8	.298
Griffey Jr., Ken	102	359	51	88	15	53	0	.245
Hairston Jr., Jerry	80	261	47	85	6	36	15	.326
Hanigan, Ryan	31	85	9	23	2	9	0	.271
Hatteberg, Scott	34	52	3	9	0	7	0	.173
Hopper, Norris	26	50	3	10	0	1	1	.200
Janish, Paul	38	80	5	15	1	6	0	.188
Keppinger, Jeff	121	459	45	122	3	43	3	.266
Owings, Micah	4	4	0	2	0	3	0	.500
Patterson, Corey	135	366	46	75	10	34	14	.205
Phillips, Andy	52	73	11	17	3	10	0	.233
Phillips, Brandon	141	559	80	146	21	78	23	.261
Richar, Danny	16	36	4	8	0	3	1	.222
Rosales, Adam	18	29	0	6	0	2	1	.207
Ross, David	52	134	17	31	3	13	0	.231
Valentín, Javier	94	129	10	33	4	18	0	.256
Votto, Joey	151	526	69	156	24	84	7	.297
Pitcher totals	162	282	17	33	1	10	1	.117
Team totals	162	5465	704	1351	187	677	85	.247

=== Starting and other pitchers ===
Note: G = Games pitched; IP = Innings pitched; W= Wins; L = Losses; K = Strikeouts; ERA = Earned run average; WHIP = Walks + Hits Per Innings Pitched

Player	G	IP	W	L	K	ERA	WHIP
Vólquez, Edinson	33 (32 starts)	196.0	17	6	206	3.21	1.33
Harang, Aaron	30 (29 starts)	184.1	6	17	153	4.78	1.38
Arroyo, Bronson	34	200.0	15	11	163	4.77	1.44
Cueto, Johnny	31	174.0	9	14	158	4.81	1.41
Fogg, Josh	22 (14 starts)	78.1	2	7	45	7.58	1.58
Bailey, Homer	8	36.1	0	6	18	7.93	2.09
Belisle, Matt	6	29.2	1	4	14	7.28	1.79
Ramírez, Ramón	5 (4 starts)	27.0	1	1	21	2.67	1.04
Thompson, Daryl	3	14.1	0	2	6	6.91	1.88

=== Relief pitchers ===
Note: G = Games pitched; IP = Innings pitched; W= Wins; L = Losses; SV = Saves; K = Strikeouts; ERA = Earned run average; WHIP = Walks + Hits Per Innings Pitched

Player	G	IP	W	L	SV	K	ERA	WHIP
Cordero, Francisco	72	70.1	5	4	34	78	3.33	1.41
Affeldt, Jeremy	74	78.1	1	1	0	80	3.33	1.31
Weathers, David	72	69.1	4	6	0	46	3.25	1.53
Bray, Bill	63	47.0	2	2	0	54	2.87	1.57
Lincoln, Mike	64	70.1	2	5	0	57	4.48	1.28
Burton, Jared	54	58.2	5	1	0	58	3.22	1.38
Majewski, Gary	37	40.0	1	0	0	27	6.53	1.90
Coffey, Todd	17	19.1	0	0	0	8	6.05	1.60
Mercker, Kent	15	13.2	1	0	0	6	3.29	1.54
Masset, Nick	10	17.1	1	0	0	11	2.08	1.21
Herrera, Danny	7	7.1	0	0	0	8	7.36	1.77
Roenicke, Josh	5	3.0	0	0	0	6	9.00	2.67
Adkins, Jon	4	3.2	1	0	0	3	2.45	1.91
Pettyjohn, Adam	3 (1 start)	4.0	0	1	0	1	20.25	3.25
Team Pitching Totals	162	1442.1	74	88	34	1227	4.55	1.46

== Farm system ==
Level	Team	League	Manager
AAA	Louisville Bats	International League	Rick Sweet
AA	Chattanooga Lookouts	Southern League	Mike Goff
A	Sarasota Reds	Florida State League	Joe Ayrault
A	Dayton Dragons	Midwest League	Donnie Scott
Rookie	GCL Reds	Gulf Coast League	Pat Kelly
Rookie	Billings Mustangs	Pioneer League	Julio Garcia
