= Ramón Ramírez (Venezuelan pitcher) =

Venezuelan baseball player (born 1982)

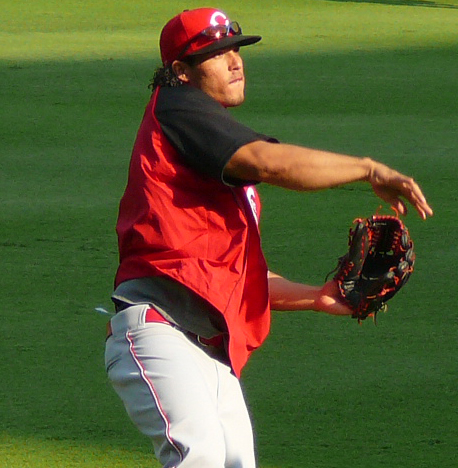
- Ramírez with the Reds in 2009
- Pitcher
- Born: September 16, 1982 (age 43); Cagua, Venezuela
- Batted: Right Threw: Right

MLB debut
- August 30, 2008, for the Cincinnati Reds

Last MLB appearance
- October 4, 2009, for the Cincinnati Reds

MLB statistics
- Win–loss record: 1–1
- Earned run average: 2.97
- Strikeouts: 29
- Stats at Baseball Reference

Teams
- Cincinnati Reds (2008–2009)

Ramón A. Ramírez (born September 16, 1982) is a Venezuelan former professional baseball pitcher. He played in Major League Baseball (MLB) for the Cincinnati Reds. He threw three pitches: a fastball, a slider, and a changeup.

Ramírez was signed by the San Diego Padres in 2000 as an outfielder, but he was released in 2001. The Reds signed him in 2003 as a pitcher, and he reached the major leagues in 2008, when he made four starts for the Reds. The next year, he appeared in 11 games in relief for the Reds. After the season, the Tampa Bay Rays claimed him off waivers, but they released him. The Boston Red Sox claimed him off waivers, and he spent 2010 in the minor leagues for them. He signed with the Doosan Bears of the Korea Baseball Organization in 2011, but he was released before appearing in a game with them.

== Professional career ==
=== San Diego Padres ===
On March 27, 2000, Ramírez was signed by the San Diego Padres as an outfielder. He was released by the Padres on June 12, 2001.

=== Cincinnati Reds ===
==== 2004–2007 ====
On May 12, 2003, Ramírez was signed by the Cincinnati Reds, this time as a pitcher. In 2004, he pitched for the Billings Mustangs of the Pioneer League, a rookie league. In 17 games (12 starts), he had three wins and six losses, which was tied for fourth in the league. However, he was 10th in the league in strikeouts (60), third in innings pitched (74 1/3), and second in earned run average (3.39, behind only Samuel Deduno's 3.18 ERA).

In 2005, Ramírez pitched for the Dayton Dragons of the single-A Midwest League. He had a 5–7 record, a 4.50 ERA, 114 innings pitched, and 90 strikeouts in 30 games (19 starts).

Ramírez pitched for the Sarasota Reds of the single-A advanced Florida State League in 2006. He had a 4–5 record, a 4.29 ERA, 53 strikeouts, 65 innings pitched, and one complete game in 15 games (11 starts).

In 2007, Ramírez began the year with Sarasota again. He had a 5–2 record, a 4.05 ERA, 73 1/3 innings pitched, and 86 strikeouts in 15 games (12 starts); and he was promoted to the Chattanooga Lookouts of the double-A Southern League on June 22. At Chattanooga, used exclusively as a relief pitcher, he had a 5–1 record, a 4.60 ERA, 31 1/3 innings pitched, and 35 strikeouts in 16 games. On August 18, he was promoted to the Louisville Bats of the triple-A International League to replace Elizardo Ramírez, who was called up to the Reds. With Louisville, Ramón Ramírez had a 1–0 record, an 0.00 ERA, 14 2/3 innings pitched, and 16 strikeouts in five games (two starts). In the minor leagues that year, he had 11 wins (tied for fourth in the Reds' system), 3 losses, a 3.70 ERA (ninth), 119 1/3 innings pitched, and 137 strikeouts (second) in 36 games (14 starts). The Cincinnati Reds added him to their 40-man roster on November 20.

==== 2008 ====
Ramírez attended Reds' spring training in 2008 but was optioned to the minors on March 10 after having an 11.57 ERA in three games. He began the season with Chattanooga. After he had a 2–3 record, a 4.70 ERA, 46 innings pitched, and 52 strikeouts in 11 games (nine starts), he was promoted to Louisville on May 23. At Louisville, he had a 4–5 record, a 3.08 ERA, 99 1/3 innings pitched, and 93 strikeouts in 19 games (15 starts). On August 30, he was called up to the Reds make a start that day in place of the injured Johnny Cueto. He gave up three runs over seven innings while striking out six, but he received a no decision in a 7–6 victory over the San Francisco Giants. He was optioned to Sarasota the next day to make room for Wilkin Castillo on the roster but was recalled on September 2. On September 4, he threw three perfect innings in relief of an injured Josh Fogg in an 8–6 victory over the Pittsburgh Pirates. Afterwards, he made three more starts for the Reds. He got his first career decision (a win) on September 19 when he gave up two runs and struck out five batters in six innings as the Reds defeated the Milwaukee Brewers, 11–2. He got his only other decision of the year on September 24, when he gave up two runs in five innings in a 5–0 loss to the Houston Astros. Ramírez finished the year 1–1, with a 2.67 ERA, 21 strikeouts, and 27 innings pitched in 5 games (4 starts). In the minors, he had a 6–8 record, a 3.59 ERA, 145 strikeouts, and 145 1/3 innings pitched in 30 games (24 starts).

==== 2009 ====
Ramírez was expected to compete for a spot in the Reds' starting rotation in 2009; however, because he missed much of spring training at the World Baseball Classic, he began the year with Louisville. On May 19, he was called up from Louisville to replace the injured Nick Masset in the bullpen. After appearing in one game, he was optioned back to Louisville on May 22 to make room for Carlos Fisher on the roster. He remained in Louisville until August 31, when he was recalled between games of a doubleheader. After giving up 4 runs in his first 3 games of the season, Ramírez gave up 1 run in his last 8 games. Used exclusively out of the bullpen, he finished the year with an 0–0 record, a 3.65 ERA, eight strikeouts, and 12 1/3 innings pitched in 11 games. At Louisville, he had a 6–7 record, a 4.03 ERA, 78 strikeouts, and 127 1/3 innings pitched in 31 games (20 starts).

=== Tampa Bay Rays/Boston Red Sox ===
On November 9, the Tampa Bay Rays claimed Ramírez off waivers, but they released him on December 3. On December 9, the Boston Red Sox claimed him off waivers. He spent the 2010 season with the Pawtucket Red Sox of the International League, where he had a 5–5 record, a 4.92 ERA, one complete game, 97 innings pitched, and 80 strikeouts in 28 games (13 starts). On November 6, he became a free agent.

=== Doosan Bears ===
In 2011, Ramírez signed with the Doosan Bears of the Korea Baseball Organization. However, he was released before playing a regular season game after he struggled in the preseason.

== International play ==
In 2009, Ramírez represented Venezuela in the World Baseball Classic, deciding to play in the tournament at the last minute. On March 10, he gave up one run in three innings of relief as Venezuela defeated Italy 10–1 to advance to the second round of the Classic. He pitched a scoreless 2/3 of an inning on March 16 as Venezuela defeated Puerto Rico 2–0. In his final game of the Classic (on March 18), Ramírez gave up two runs in 1 2/3 innings, but Venezuela defeated the United States 10–6 to advance to the semifinals.

== Pitching style ==
Ramírez throws three pitches: a fastball, a slider, and a changeup. Rays' general manager Andrew Friedman described the fastball as "average", the slider as "pretty good", and the changeup as "above-average."

== See also ==
- List of Major League Baseball players from Venezuela
