= Royce Clayton =

American baseball player (born 1970)

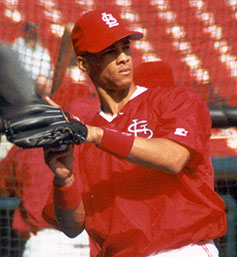
- Clayton with the St. Louis Cardinals
- Shortstop
- Born: January 2, 1970 (age 56); Burbank, California, U.S.
- Batted: Right Threw: Right

MLB debut
- September 20, 1991, for the San Francisco Giants

Last MLB appearance
- September 30, 2007, for the Boston Red Sox

MLB statistics
- Batting average: .258
- Home runs: 110
- Runs batted in: 723
- Stats at Baseball Reference

Teams
- San Francisco Giants (1991–1995); St. Louis Cardinals (1996–1998); Texas Rangers (1998–2000); Chicago White Sox (2001–2002); Milwaukee Brewers (2003); Colorado Rockies (2004); Arizona Diamondbacks (2005); Washington Nationals (2006); Cincinnati Reds (2006); Toronto Blue Jays (2007); Boston Red Sox (2007)

Career highlights and awards
- All-Star (1997)
Medals
Men's baseball
Representing United States
World Junior Baseball Championship
Silver medal – second place	1987 Windsor	Team

Royce Spencer Clayton (born January 2, 1970) is an American former professional baseball shortstop. He played in Major League Baseball for the San Francisco Giants, St. Louis Cardinals, Texas Rangers, Chicago White Sox, Milwaukee Brewers, Colorado Rockies, Arizona Diamondbacks, Washington Nationals, Cincinnati Reds, Toronto Blue Jays, and Boston Red Sox between 1991 and 2007.

As an amateur, Clayton played baseball at St. Bernard High School and for the United States national under-18 baseball team. The Giants selected him in the first round of the 1988 MLB draft and he made his MLB debut in 1991. The Giants traded Clayton to the Cardinals, where he succeeded his childhood idol, Ozzie Smith, as their starting shortstop and made the All-Star Game in 1997. Traded to Texas in 1998, Clayton signed a free agent contract to stay with the Rangers during the offseason. From 2001 to 2007, he played for Chicago, Milwaukee, Colorado, Arizona, Washington, Cincinnati, Toronto, and Boston.

After his playing career, Clayton appeared in the film Moneyball and pursued various business ventures. He has been the head varsity baseball coach at Oaks Christian School in Westlake Village, California, since 2016.

== Early life ==
Clayton was born on January 2, 1970, in Burbank, California, and was raised in Inglewood. His father, Royal Sr., was a car salesman and his mother, Antoinette, worked for Trans World Airlines. He has an older brother, Royal Jr. Growing up in the middle class, Clayton's parents stressed academics and did not allow him to play Little League Baseball until he was eight years old. He began to play as a third baseman. After attending a game between the Los Angeles Dodgers and St. Louis Cardinals at Dodger Stadium, he began to idolize Cardinals' shortstop Ozzie Smith and switched to playing shortstop.

Rather than attend nearby Inglewood High School, Clayton attended St. Bernard High School, a private school in Playa del Rey. He played for the school's baseball team as a shortstop. Clayton would sometimes take the field with a back flip, which Smith was known to do. In 1987, his junior year, Clayton had a .448 batting average. He played in the California Interscholastic Federation's Southern Section 1-A championship game at Dodger Stadium, but lost to Whittier Christian High School. He was invited to the U.S. Olympic Festival in Raleigh-Durham, North Carolina, and earned a spot on the United States national under-18 baseball team for the 1987 World Junior Baseball Championships, held in Windsor, Ontario. The United States won the silver medal, losing the championship game to Cuba.

Clayton had a .513 batting average in 26 games played during his senior year in 1988. He signed a National Letter of Intent to attend the University of Southern California (USC) to play college baseball for the USC Trojans on an athletic scholarship. He chose USC over Florida State University and Loyola Marymount University.

== Professional career ==
=== San Francisco Giants (1988–1995) ===
Prior to the 1988 Major League Baseball (MLB) draft, the MLB Scouting Bureau named Clayton one of the 25 best amateur American prospects. The San Francisco Giants selected Clayton in the first round with the 15th overall selection of the draft. He opted to sign with San Francisco for a $195,000 signing bonus rather than attend USC. The Giants assigned him to the Everett Giants of the Class A Short Season Northwest League. In 1988, Clayton hit .259 with 30 runs batted in (RBIs), and 10 stolen bases in 60 games for Everett. Starting the 1989 season with the Clinton Giants of the Class A Midwest League, Clayton struggled initially, batting below .200 by the end of May. After batting .310 in June and July, Clayton earn a promotion to the San Jose Giants of the Class A-Advanced California League on July 29. He batted .120 and 10 stolen bases in 28 games for San Jose after the promotion. Clayton returned to San Jose in 1990, where he batted .252 in the first half. He delivered the game-winning hit in the California League's all-star game. He finished the 1990 season with a .267 average, seven home runs, 71 RBIs, and 33 stolen bases.

In 1991, Clayton played for the Shreveport Captains of the Double-A Texas League. Clayton played in the Texas League All-Star Game. He batted .280 with 68 RBIs and 36 stolen bases during the 1991 season, helping Shreveport win the Texas League championship. After the 1991 season, Baseball America named Clayton the best defensive shortstop and most exciting player in the Texas League, and The Sporting News named him the best prospect in baseball.

After the Texas League's season ended, the Giants promoted Clayton to the major leagues for their final road trip of the season. He made his major league debut on September 20. Clayton batted .115 (3-for-26) in nine games. He arrived to spring training in 1992 having added muscle, increasing his weight from 160 to 175 pounds (73 to 79 kg). Clayton competed with José Uribe for the Giants' starting shortstop position. The Giants named Clayton to their Opening Day roster in 1992 as their starting shortstop. After Clayton batted .207 for the Giants through June 20, the Giants demoted him to the Phoenix Firebirds of the Triple-A Pacific Coast League. Clayton batted .237 in 43 games for Phoenix, and was recalled to the major leagues on August 19 when Uribe went on the disabled list with a torn muscle in his rib cage. Between both stints with the Giants in the 1992 season, Clayton batted .224 in 98 games. He earned $109,000, the major league's minimum salary, for the 1992 season.

Before the 1993 season, Clayton signed a one-year contract with the Giants worth $155,000. Uribe's contract expired after the 1992 season, and Clayton became the Giants' regular shortstop. He batted .282 in 153 games, tied Chris Speier's franchise record of 70 RBIs for a shortstop, and led all National League shortstops with 103 double plays turned. After the 1993 season, the Giants offered Clayton a four-year contract worth $9.2 million, but he declined. Clayton signed a contract worth $325,000 for the 1994 season. Clayton and several of his teammates struggled in 1994; he batted .236 with 30 RBIs. The Giants made an offer of a two-year contract after the 1994 season, which Clayton rejected. He signed a one-year contract for the 1995 season worth $475,000. Clayton batted .244 in 138 games in the 1995 season. He also recorded 223 putouts, 411 assists, and 654 total chances, the most among all National League shortstops.

The Giants began to discuss trading Clayton to other teams after the 1995 season as they remained unable to agree to terms on a contract extension. Rich Aurilia was ready to become the Giants' starting shortstop and the team needed to improve their depth of pitchers.

=== St. Louis Cardinals (1996–1998) ===
Coming into the 1996 season, Ozzie Smith remained on a perpetual contract with the Cardinals. He was 41 years old and only batted .199 in 44 games during the 1995 season due to a shoulder injury. Cardinals manager Tony La Russa and general manager Walt Jocketty sought to acquire another shortstop as insurance in case Smith could not compete. They attempted to sign Walt Weiss and Greg Gagne, but neither wanted to play in a platoon with Smith, an all-time great.

The Giants traded Clayton and a player to be named later to the St. Louis Cardinals for Doug Creek, Rich DeLucia, and Allen Watson on December 14, 1995. The Giants sent Chris Wimmer to the Cardinals in January 1996 to complete the trade. Eligible for salary arbitration for the first time, Clayton signed a $1.6 million contract with St. Louis for the 1996 season, more than tripling his 1995 salary.

In his first year as the Cardinals' manager, Tony La Russa announced that Smith and Clayton would compete for the starting job in spring training in 1996. Though Smith had better statistics during spring training than Clayton, La Russa gave Clayton the start on Opening Day and the majority of the playing time during the season. Cardinals' fans booed Clayton because they preferred Smith. Clayton batted .277 with 33 stolen bases and a .972 fielding percentage, the fourth-best among National League shortstops, in 129 games played. Smith announced in June that he would retire at the end of the season. The Cardinals reached the postseason; they defeated the San Diego Padres in the 1996 National League Division Series and lost to the Atlanta Braves in the 1996 National League Championship Series. Clayton had a .346 average during the 1996 postseason.

After failing to come to terms on a multi-year contract, Clayton and the Cardinals agreed to a one-year, $2.6 million contract for the 1997 season. He was selected to the 1997 MLB All-Star Game as an injury replacement for Barry Larkin. At the time, he was batting .261 with six home runs and 19 stolen bases, and had already exceeded his 1996 season totals in RBIs and extra-base hits with 36 and 31, respectively. Clayton batted .266 in 154 games in 1997. He led all National League shortstops with 452 assists. Before the 1998 season, the Cardinals signed Clayton for a $3.5 million salary in his final year before becoming eligible for free agency. He began the season batting .234 in 90 games for the Cardinals.

=== Texas Rangers (1998–2000) ===
With the Cardinals struggling during the 1998 season and Clayton due to become a free agent after the season, the Cardinals traded Clayton and Todd Stottlemyre to the Texas Rangers for Darren Oliver, Fernando Tatís, and a player to be named later on July 31, 1998. Mark Little was sent to St. Louis in August to complete the trade. Clayton took over at shortstop for the Rangers from Kevin Elster, who Texas released. Clayton batted .285 in 52 games for Texas during the 1998 season. The Rangers overtook the Anaheim Angels to win the American League West division but lost to the New York Yankees in the 1998 American League Division Series.

A free agent after the 1998 season, Clayton signed a four-year, $18 million contract to remain with Texas. Clayton batted. 288 in 133 games during the 1999 season, and the Rangers won the division again. The Rangers lost to the Yankees in the 1999 American League Division Series.

In April 2000, Clayton and teammate Chad Curtis got into a shoving match after Curtis insisted on turning off rap music that Clayton was playing when Curtis objected to the lyrics. In May, Clayton wrote a blog post calling out Curtis, and Rangers manager Johnny Oates had them apologize to each other. Clayton batted .242 in 148 games for Texas in 2000. He also led all American League shortstops with 265 putouts.

=== Chicago White Sox and Milwaukee Brewers (2001–2003) ===
Days after the Rangers signed Alex Rodriguez to a 10-year, $252 million contract to be their new shortstop, the Rangers traded Clayton to the Chicago White Sox for Aaron Myette and Brian Schmack on December 14, 2000. José Valentín of the White Sox had led all major league shortstops in errors in the 2000 season, so the White Sox tried using him as their center fielder for the 2001 season. Clayton struggled offensively in April and May of the 2001 season, batting .099, but he rebounded to hit .310 for the remainder of the season to finish with a .263 average in 135 games. Clayton batted .197 through the first 54 games of the 2002 season and was benched by White Sox manager Jerry Manuel in early June, who increased Tony Graffanino's playing time. Only a week later, Manuel returned Clayton to the lineup at shortstop, alternating playing time with Valentín and Graffanino. At the end of July, Manuel decided that Valentín would receive the majority of playing time at shortstop for the remainder of the season. The White Sox released Clayton on September 8. He batted .251 with seven home runs and 35 RBIs in 112 games during the 2002 season.

On December 11, 2002, the Milwaukee Brewers signed Clayton to a one-year contract worth $1.75 million for the 2003 season to succeed José Hernández as their starting shortstop. The contract included a club option for the 2004 season. Clayton batted .228 with 11 home runs and 39 RBIs in 2003. The Brewers declined the $3 million option in Clayton's contract for the 2004 season, buying him out for $290,000 instead, making Clayton a free agent.

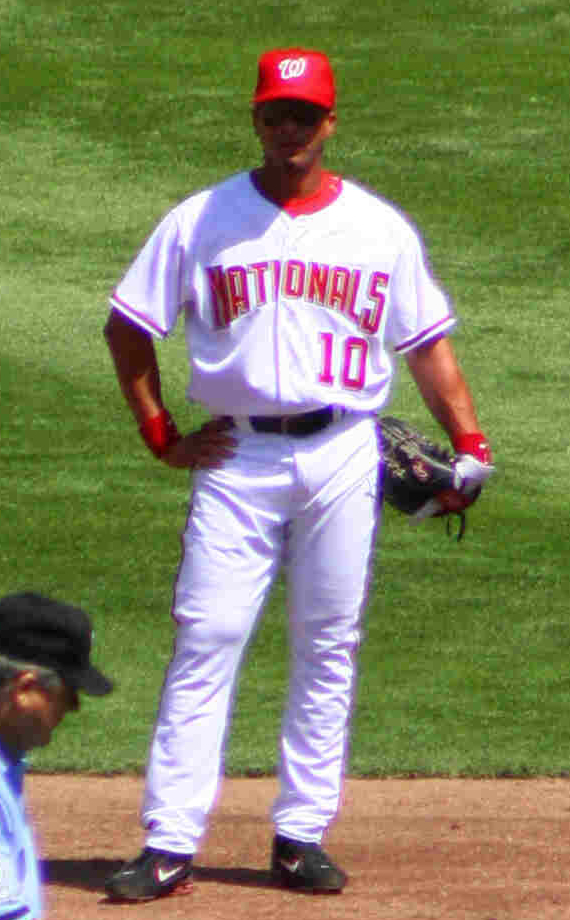
Clayton with the Washington Nationals in 2006

=== Later career (2004–2007) ===
Clayton signed a minor league contract with the Colorado Rockies for the 2004 season worth $650,000, and he made the Rockies' Opening Day roster as their starting shortstop. He hit .270 with eight home runs and 54 RBIs for the Rockies in 2004, and led all National League shortstops with a .986 fielding percentage. However, the Rockies did not re-sign Clayton, giving the 2005 shortstop role to Clint Barmes. Clayton signed a one-year contract worth $1.35 million with the Arizona Diamondbacks for the 2005 season, displacing Alex Cintrón as the starting shortstop. Clayton batted .270 in 143 games for Arizona.

On February 2, 2006, Clayton signed a minor league contract with the Washington Nationals, who acquired him to serve as a backup to their incumbent starting shortstop, Cristian Guzmán, who had struggled during the 2005 season. The contract called for Clayton to earn $1 million if he made the team and another $250,000 available through incentives based on his playing time. Guzmán tore a muscle in his shoulder during spring training, and Clayton opened the 2006 season as the Nationals' starting shortstop. He batted .269 in 87 games for Washington.

On July 13, 2006, the Nationals traded Clayton, Bill Bray, Brendan Harris, Gary Majewski, and Daryl Thompson to the Cincinnati Reds for Austin Kearns, Felipe López, and Ryan Wagner. Clayton batted .235 in 50 games for the Reds after the trade.

On November 29, 2006, Clayton signed a one-year contract worth $1.5 million with the Toronto Blue Jays, who said that he would split playing time with Aaron Hill and John McDonald in the middle infield. By June, Clayton lost playing time as the Blue Jays played Hill at second base and McDonald at shortstop. The Blue Jays released Clayton on August 8, 2007, after he batted .254 with one home run and 12 RBIs in 69 games.

Clayton signed a minor league with the Boston Red Sox on August 23, and they assigned him to the Pawtucket Red Sox of the Class AAA International League. He had a .143 batting average and three RBIs in seven games. They promoted him to the major leagues to provide infield depth behind starters Dustin Pedroia and Julio Lugo and backup Alex Cora on September 1, when rosters expanded. Clayton wanted the chance to play for a team in contention for a playoff spot. The Red Sox were the 11th team that Clayton played for, tying the record for position players set by Todd Zeile. In eight games for the Red Sox, Clayton batted 0-for-6. The Red Sox won the 2007 World Series. Clayton did not appear in the postseason, he received a World Series ring at Fenway Park in April 2008.

After not receiving any contract offers, Clayton retired in March 2008. He finished his career with a .258 average, 110 home runs, 1,904 hits, and 231 stolen bases. Clayton was a candidate for induction into the Baseball Hall of Fame during the 2013 balloting but did not receive any votes.

== Post-playing career ==
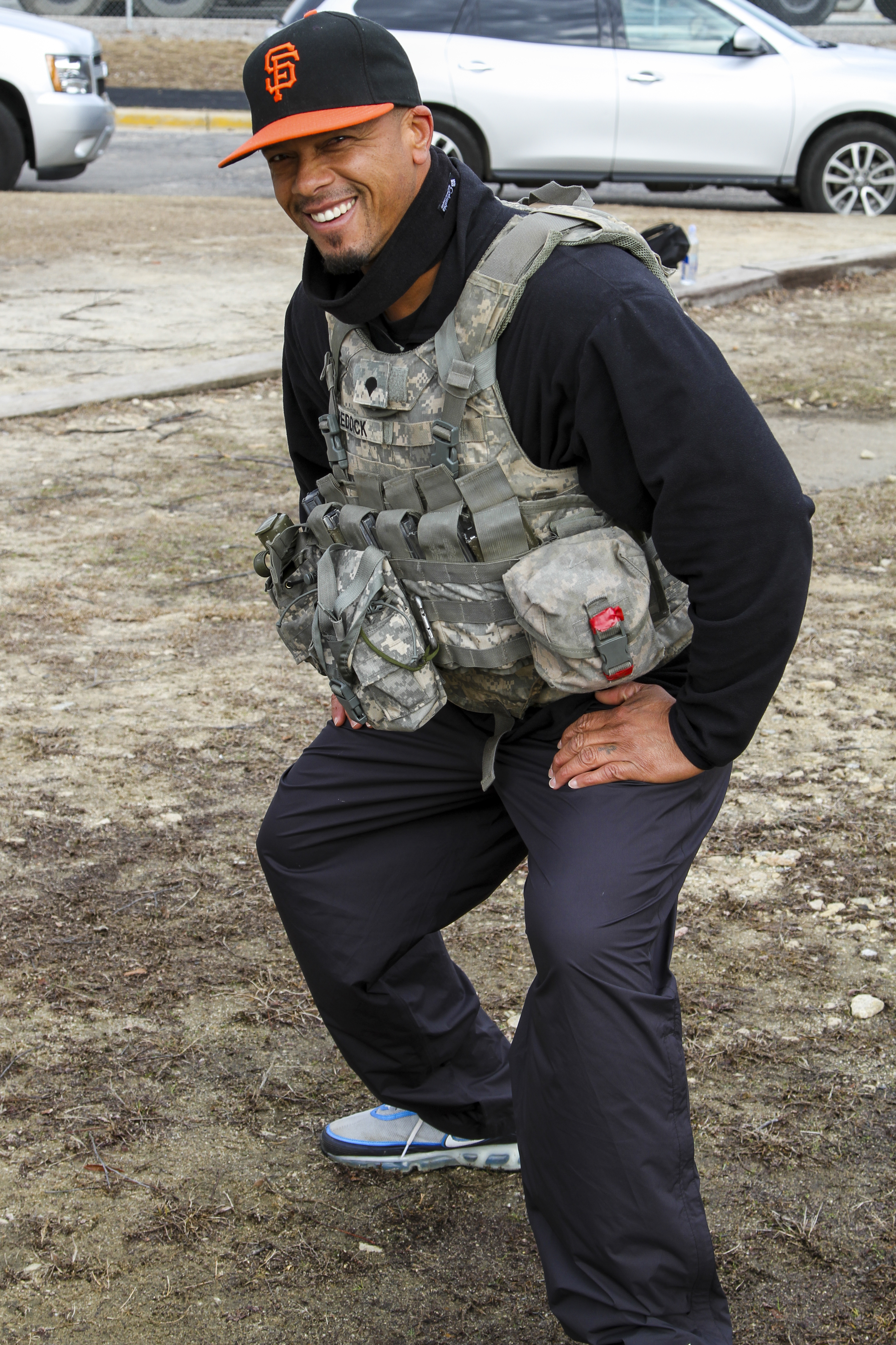
Clayton in 2014

After his playing career, Clayton invested in and became a member of the advisory board of the Goldwater Bank in Arizona. He also worked in real estate and started entertainment companies that worked to develop walk up music for batters and theme songs for players, including one written for Tim Lincecum that aired on Major League Baseball on Fox during Game 5 of the 2010 World Series.

Clayton became involved in coaching youth baseball. He coached Little League Baseball in Malibu, California. On September 12, 2016, Clayton became the head varsity baseball coach for Oaks Christian School in Westlake Village, California. Dmitri Young was an assistant coach for Clayton for three years before becoming head coach at Camarillo High School.

== Personal life ==
After signing his contract with Texas, Clayton and his parents began the Royce Clayton Family Foundation, which worked with numerous charitable organizations, such as Reviving Baseball in Inner Cities, the Jackie Robinson Foundation, and the Sickle Cell Disease Association of America. He also contributed to rebuilding his former Little League Baseball field in Ladera Heights, California.

Clayton met Samantha Davies, a sprinter who represented Great Britain at the 2000 Summer Olympics, in 2000. They married the next year. Clayton credited his wife with teaching him to keep his legs in condition for the longevity of his baseball career; he ran 200-meter (660 ft) sprints during the offseason to maintain his speed. They have two daughters, Niya and Imani, and two sons, Royce Jr and Elijah. Elijah, Niya, and Imani are triplets. Royce's brother, Royal Clayton, also played baseball professionally, playing in Triple-A from 1990 to 1995.

Clayton was on set as an adviser in the 2002 film The Rookie, which depicts the career of Jim Morris. Another actor portrayed Clayton in the film, as Morris struck out Clayton while making his major league debut in 1999. Clayton portrayed Miguel Tejada in the 2011 film Moneyball. As Tejada is from the Dominican Republic, Clayton attempted a Dominican accent, but the filmmakers told him to speak without one.

== See also ==
- List of Colorado Rockies team records
- List of Major League Baseball career stolen bases leaders
