= Ryan Wagner =

American baseball player (born 1982)

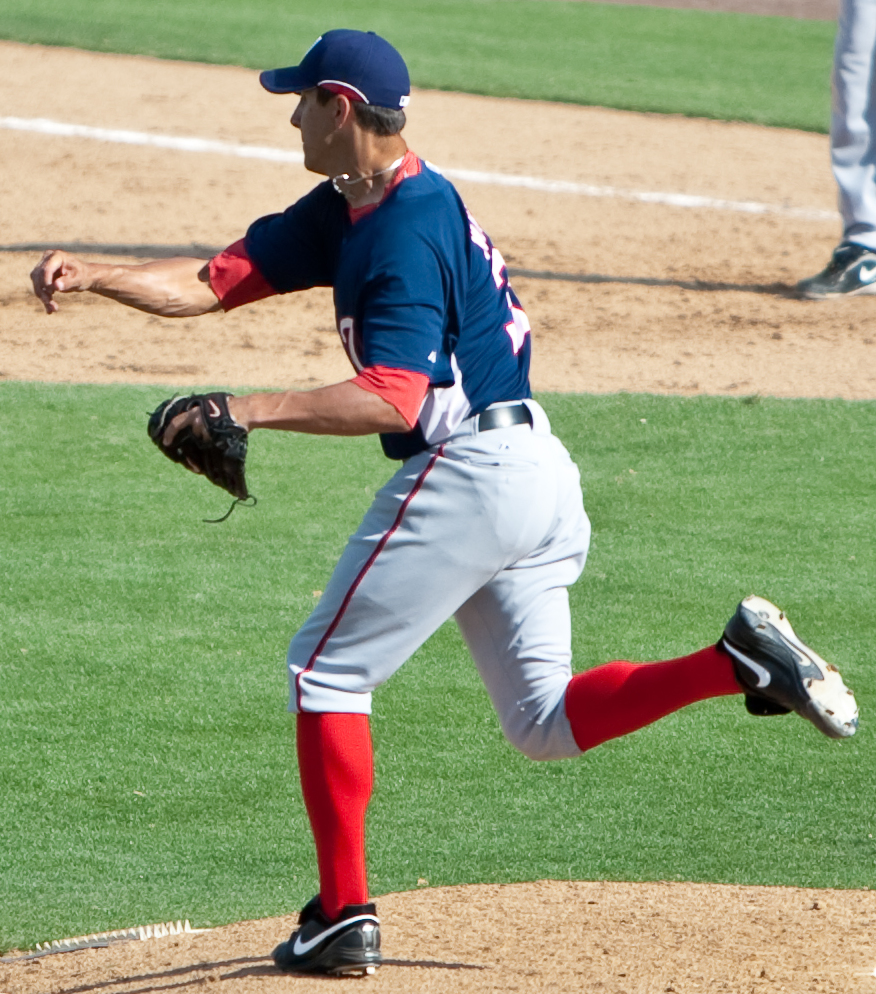
- Wagner with the Washington Nationals in 2009 spring training
- Pitcher
- Born: July 15, 1982 (age 43); Yoakum, Texas, U.S.
- Batted: Right Threw: Right

MLB debut
- July 19, 2003, for the Cincinnati Reds

Last MLB appearance
- May 6, 2007, for the Washington Nationals

MLB statistics
- Win–loss record: 11–9
- Earned run average: 4.79
- Strikeouts: 130
- Stats at Baseball Reference

Teams
- Cincinnati Reds (2003–2006); Washington Nationals (2006–2007)

Ryan Scott Wagner (born July 15, 1982) is an American former professional baseball relief pitcher. He played in Major League Baseball (MLB) for the Cincinnati Reds and the Washington Nationals. Wagner was an All-American closer for the University of Houston.

== Early life ==
Wagner played college baseball with the Houston Cougars in 2002 and 2003. In his second year there, Wagner set a school record by recording 15 saves and he had 148 strikeouts in 79 1/3 innings pitched. His ratio of 16.8 strikeouts per nine innings broke an NCAA Division I record that was almost 40 years old. He was named a First-Team All-American by several organizations.

Shortly before the 2003 Major League Baseball draft, Baseball America said that Wagner should be a mid-first-round draft choice, having passed a player named Brad Sullivan as the most in-demand pitcher on the University of Houston staff. The publication said that Wagner had "the most unhittable slider in the draft" as his primary pitch, but it noted that Wagner's delivery made some scouts worry about the risk of an arm injury. Wagner was selected in the first round (14th overall) by the Reds in the 2003 draft.

== Career ==
When Wagner debuted with the Cincinnati Reds in 2003, he was the first player from that year's draft to make the major leagues. He appeared in 108 games over the next 2+ seasons. In 2006, Wagner was back in the minors when the Reds included him in an 8-player trade that sent Austin Kearns and Felipe López to the Washington Nationals in exchange for Gary Majewski, Royce Clayton, Bill Bray, Brendan Harris, and Daryl Thompson.

Wagner appeared in 14 games for Washington in 2007 before going on the disabled list. He missed the remainder of the 2007 season after having surgery to repair a torn labrum in his right shoulder. Wagner, along with Pete Orr and Chad Cordero, rejected his assignment to Triple-A, becoming a free agent on October 30, 2008. Shortly thereafter, Wagner re-signed with Washington.

Wagner announced his retirement from baseball on May 18, 2009.
