= Austin Kearns =

American baseball player (born 1980)

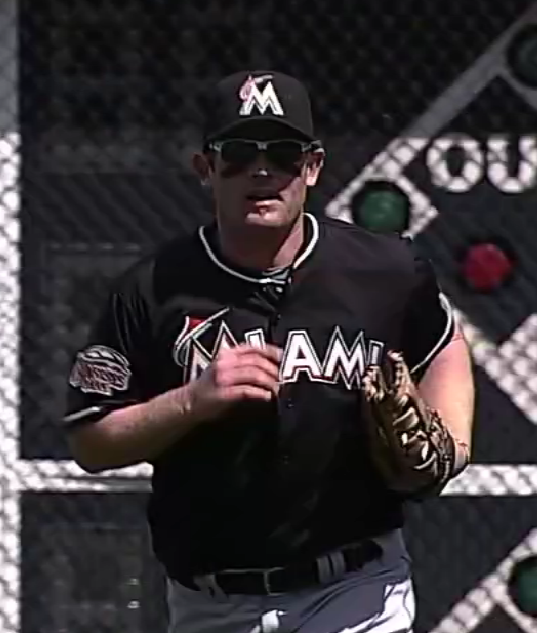
- Kearns with the Miami Marlins
- Right fielder
- Born: May 20, 1980 (age 46); Lexington, Kentucky, U.S.
- Batted: Right Threw: Right

MLB debut
- April 17, 2002, for the Cincinnati Reds

Last MLB appearance
- May 3, 2013, for the Miami Marlins

MLB statistics
- Batting average: .253
- Home runs: 121
- Runs batted in: 494
- Stats at Baseball Reference

Teams
- Cincinnati Reds (2002–2006); Washington Nationals (2006–2009); Cleveland Indians (2010); New York Yankees (2010); Cleveland Indians (2011); Miami Marlins (2012–2013)

Austin Ryan Kearns (born May 20, 1980) is an American former professional baseball outfielder. He played in Major League Baseball (MLB) from 2002 through 2013 for the Cincinnati Reds, Washington Nationals, Cleveland Indians, New York Yankees, and Miami Marlins.

== Baseball career ==
=== Cincinnati Reds ===
After playing at Lafayette Senior High School, he was offered a scholarship to play college baseball at the University of Florida. However, he decided to sign with the Cincinnati Reds after being selected seventh overall in the 1998 Major League Baseball draft. After three seasons in the Reds' minor league system, he made his Major League debut on April 17, 2002. By July, he was in the running for NL Rookie of the Year, hitting .286 with 8 home runs and 40 RBIs. Kearns ultimately finished three in the voting, behind Jason Jennings and Brad Wilkerson. He hit .315 with 13 home runs in 107 games in his rookie season.

Kearns underwent surgery in March 2003 to remove loose bodies from his left elbow. He played just 82 games that year after suffering a torn labrum and rotator cuff in his right shoulder following a home plate collision with Atlanta Braves pitcher Ray King.

In April 2004, Kearns was hit by a pitch from Pittsburgh Pirates pitcher Ryan Vogelsong that broke his left forearm. In June, he also required surgery on his right thumb to clear our scar tissue.

=== Washington Nationals ===
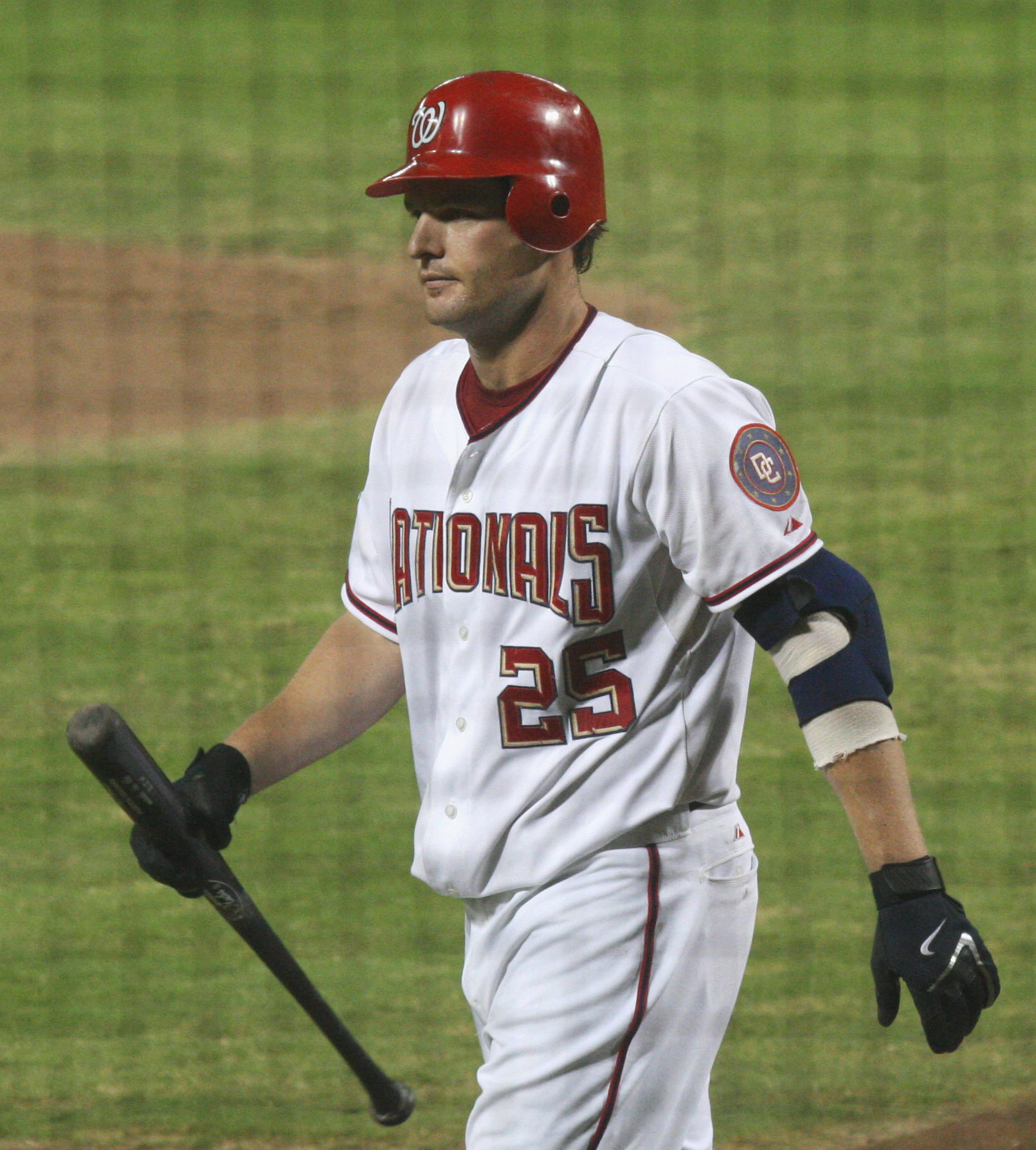
Kearns, with the Washington Nationals in 2007.

In a highly controversial and criticized trade, Kearns was traded to the Nationals on July 13, 2006, along with Felipe Lopez and Ryan Wagner from the Cincinnati Reds in exchange for Gary Majewski, Bill Bray, Royce Clayton, Brendan Harris, and Daryl Thompson.

On September 23, 2006, playing against the New York Mets at Shea Stadium, Kearns and first baseman Nick Johnson collided while making a sliding attempt to catch a fly ball. Kearns originally remained in the game relatively unhurt, but was removed shortly after play resumed by Manager Frank Robinson. Kearns was replaced by Ryan Church, who played in Kearns' spot for most of the rest of the season. Kearns suffered severe bruising down his left side as well as soreness. Johnson sustained a broken femur and underwent surgery that night to repair his injuries. Johnson missed all of 2007 recuperating from his injuries. Kearns, however, had career highs in several key areas, including 161 games played and 74 RBIs.

On May 12, 2007, in a game at home against the Florida Marlins, Kearns hit a bases-empty inside-the-park home run, the first ever for a Nationals player. The ball bounced off the glove of Florida Marlins player Reggie Abercrombie. Down the stretch, he tallied 4 hits in 11 at bats (with 2 home runs) in a late-season Nats' series sweep over the division leading New York Mets that kept the Mets out of the playoffs.

In 2008, the Nationals placed Kearns on the 15-day disabled list on May 22 because of loose bodies in his right elbow and on August 25 with a stress fracture in his left foot.

Kearns was placed on the disabled list on August 5, 2009, with a right thumb injury. His move to the list was retroactive to August 4. He did not return to the majors in 2009. On November 6, the Nationals declined Kearns' 2010 option, making him a free agent.

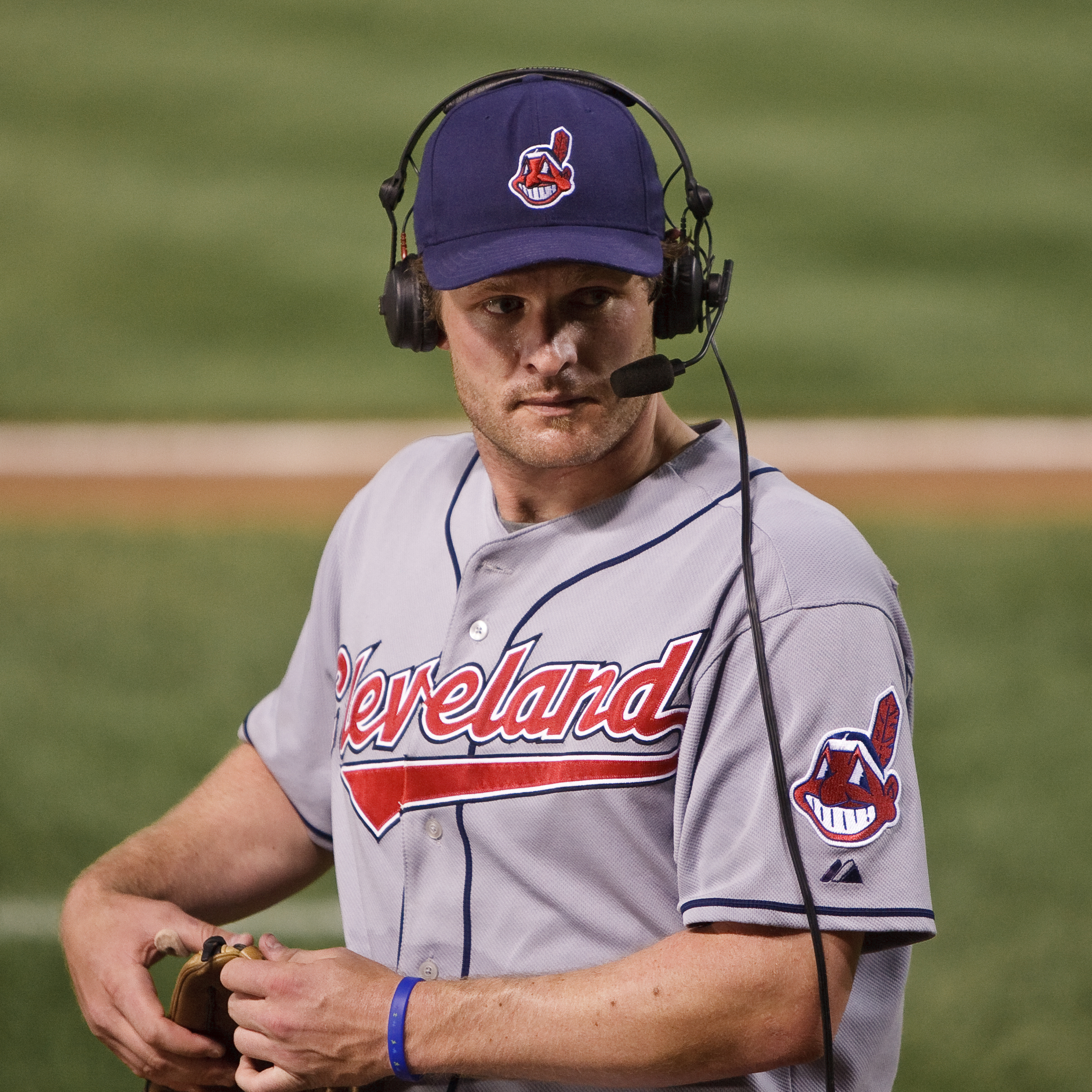
Kearns in an interview while with Cleveland

=== Cleveland Indians ===
On January 5, 2010, Kearns signed a minor league contract with the Cleveland Indians with an invite to spring training. He was added to the major league roster on April 3. On July 5, 2010, Kearns was hit by a pitch three times by Texas Rangers pitchers. This tied the franchise and MLB record for most hits by pitches in a game. The last player hit three times was Manny Ramirez on the same day in 2008.

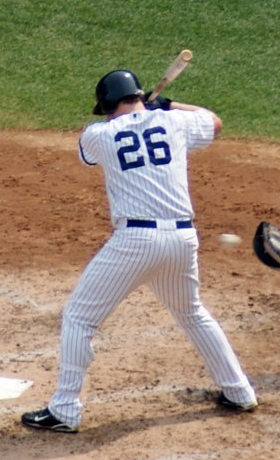
Kearns batting for the New York Yankees in 2010.

=== New York Yankees ===
On July 30, 2010, Kearns was traded to the New York Yankees for a player to be named later, later identified as pitcher Zach McAllister. Kearns was part of the Yankees 2010 postseason roster until the team lost to the Texas Rangers in the 2010 ALCS.

=== Second stint with Cleveland ===
On December 20, 2010, Kearns signed a one-year deal with Cleveland. Kearns was arrested on February 12 in Lexington, Kentucky for a DUI. He later entered a conditional guilty plea. He was designated for assignment on August 12, 2011, as Shin-Soo Choo returned from the disabled list. Kearns was released on August 17.

=== Miami Marlins ===
Kearns signed a minor league contract with the Miami Marlins on January 25, 2012. He also received an invitation to spring training and would later make the Opening Day roster.

On May 23, the Marlins placed Kearns on a 15-day disabled list after he strained his right hamstring. He returned on June 7. In 2012, he hit .245 with 6 doubles, 4 home runs, 16 RBI, 22 walks, and 2 stolen bases in 147 at bats.

Kearns re-signed with Miami for the 2013 season. He was batting .185 through 19 games before he was placed on the bereavement list by the Marlins on May 5. His mother suffered a heart attack. Kearns did not return to the team after seven games, so the Marlins transferred him to the restricted list.

== Post-playing career and personal life ==
Kearns did not officially announce his retirement from baseball. In 2015, following his mother's heart attack, he remained in Lexington to work with his sons' youth league teams and serve as a volunteer coach with Lexington Christian Academy. He also has hosted an annual golf tournament fundraiser with former Kentucky Wildcats baseball coach Keith Madison Austin is now the head baseball coach at West Jessamine High School in Nicholasville, Ky.

Kearns and his wife Abby have three children.
