= Walt Jocketty =

American baseball executive (1951–2025)

- Born: February 19, 1951; Minneapolis, Minnesota, U.S.
- Died: April 25, 2025 (aged 74); Phoenix, Arizona, U.S.
- Education: Metropolitan State University; University of Minnesota (BBA)
- Known for: General manager of St. Louis Cardinals and Cincinnati Reds
- Spouse: Sue
- Children: 2
- Awards: St. Louis Cardinals Hall of Fame

Walter Joseph Jocketty (February 19, 1951 – April 25, 2025) was an American professional baseball executive. He served in Major League Baseball (MLB) as general manager of the St. Louis Cardinals from 1994 to 2007, and general manager, president of baseball operations, and executive advisor for the Cincinnati Reds from 2008 until his death in 2025.

== Early life ==
Jocketty was born in Minneapolis, Minnesota on February 19, 1951. He had two brothers and three sisters.

Jocketty attended Marshall-University High School in Minneapolis, where he played baseball, football, basketball, and hockey. He attended the University of Minnesota, where he earned a bachelor's degree in business administration.

== Career ==
=== Oakland and Colorado ===
Jocketty began working for the Oakland Athletics beginning in March 1980, when he was hired by owner Charlie Finley as Director of Minor League Operations and Scouting. It was in this capacity that Jocketty took a lead role in overhauling the A's minor league system, and was also instrumental in founding the Arizona Rookie League and the Dominican Summer League. Less than five years into his time with Oakland, Jocketty was promoted to Director of Baseball Administration, a post he held the remainder of his time in Oakland. During the 1994 season Jocketty served the Colorado Rockies for a brief stint as their assistant general manager of player personnel.

=== St. Louis Cardinals (1994-2007) ===
Jocketty was hired as general manager of the St. Louis Cardinals on October 14, 1994. When Anheuser-Busch sold the team following the 1995 season, the new ownership chose to retain Jocketty. He was instrumental in bringing new manager Tony La Russa, whom he had worked with in Oakland, to St. Louis. During his tenure he traded for Mark McGwire, Scott Rolen, Larry Walker, Chris Carpenter, Jim Edmonds, Jason Isringhausen and Adam Wainwright, solidifying the team that compiled seven National League Central Division titles (1996, 2000, 2002, 2004, 2005, 2006), two National League championships (2004 and 2006), and one World Series championship (2006). The Cardinals had seven straight winning seasons under Jocketty, including 100+ win seasons in 2004 and 2005. Jocketty won The Sporting News Executive of the Year Award three times, in 2000, 2004, and 2010.

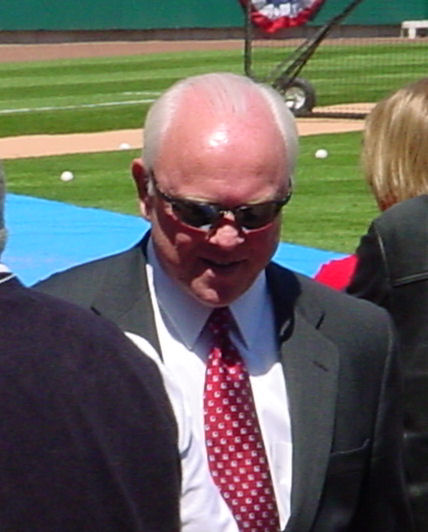
Jocketty before Opening Day 2006 at Busch Stadium

Jocketty was fired by the Cardinals organization on October 3, 2007. Team owner Bill DeWitt cited divisiveness in the baseball operations front office as the reason for Jocketty's dismissal.

=== Cincinnati Reds (2008-2025) ===
Jocketty was hired as a special advisor to the Cincinnati Reds on January 11, 2008. Jocketty's role was to advise and assist the team in their baseball operations which includes the front office, personnel, scouting, minor and international operations and training and medical services. He was named the next general manager of the Reds after Wayne Krivsky was fired on April 23, 2008.

After the 2010 season, Jocketty was named Sporting News Executive Of Year. After the 2015 season, he was named to the new position of president of baseball operations. On December 27, 2016, he was named executive advisor to the CEO.

== Death ==
Walt Jocketty died on April 25, 2025, at the age of 74.

Preceded by Dal Maxvill	St. Louis Cardinals General Manager; 1995–2007	Succeeded by John Mozeliak
Preceded by Wayne Krivsky	Cincinnati Reds General Manager; 2008–2015	Succeeded by Dick Williams
