= Homer Bailey =

American baseball player (born 1986)

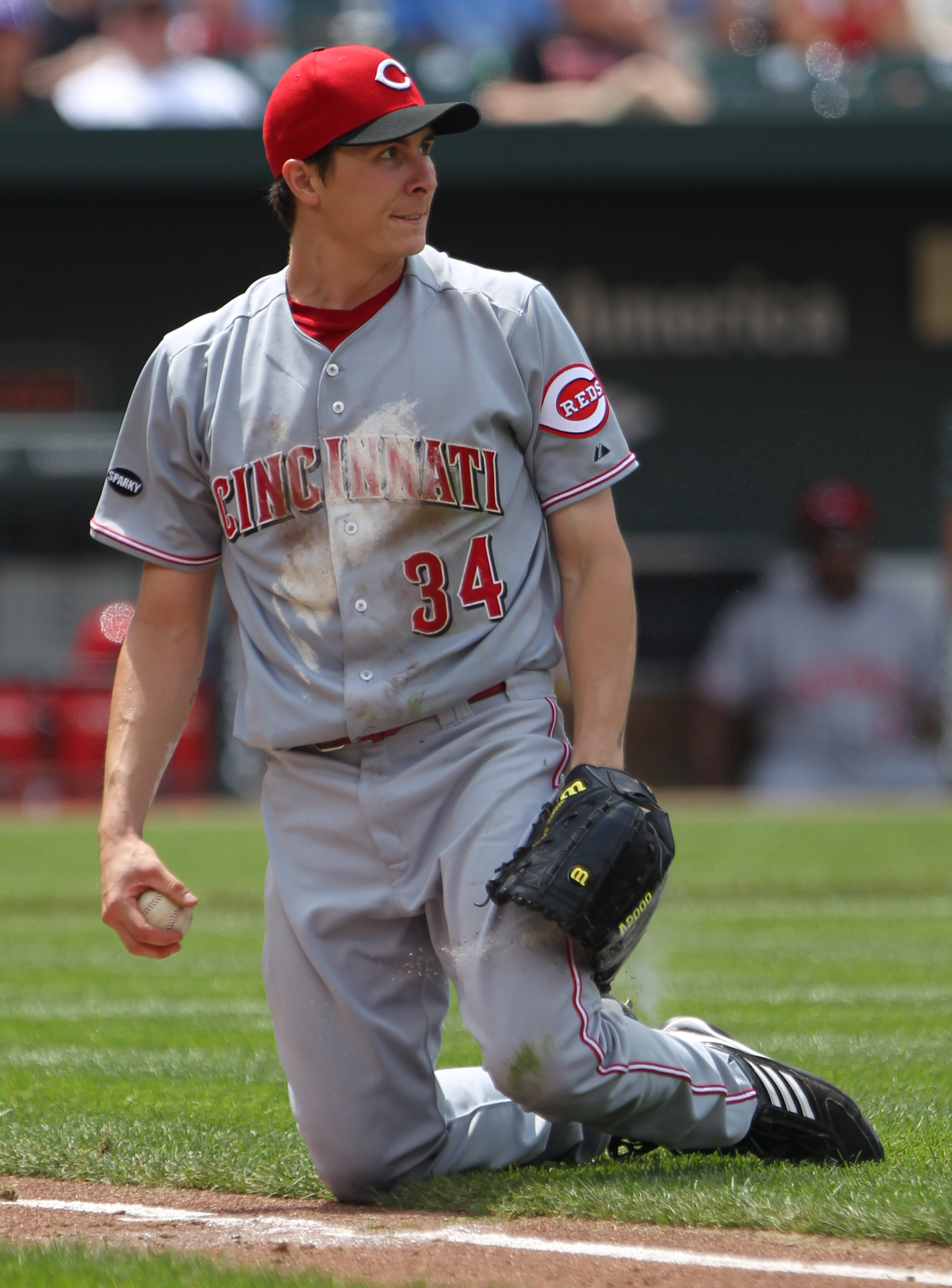
- Bailey with the Cincinnati Reds in 2011
- Pitcher
- Born: May 3, 1986 (age 40); La Grange, Texas, U.S.
- Batted: Right Threw: Right

MLB debut
- June 8, 2007, for the Cincinnati Reds

Last MLB appearance
- September 22, 2020, for the Minnesota Twins

MLB statistics
- Win–loss record: 81–86
- Earned run average: 4.56
- Strikeouts: 1,157
- Stats at Baseball Reference

Teams
- Cincinnati Reds (2007–2018); Kansas City Royals (2019); Oakland Athletics (2019); Minnesota Twins (2020)

Career highlights and awards
- Pitched two no-hitters (2012, 2013)

David Dewitt "Homer" Bailey Jr. (born May 3, 1986) is an American former professional baseball pitcher. He played in Major League Baseball (MLB) for the Cincinnati Reds from 2007 through 2018, the Kansas City Royals and Oakland Athletics in 2019, and the Minnesota Twins in 2020.

The Reds selected Bailey in the first round (seventh overall) of the 2004 MLB draft. Prior to the 2007 season, both Baseball America and Baseball Prospectus named Bailey the top prospect in the Reds' farm system. Because of his success at the minor league level, Bailey's debut was highly anticipated when he was called up to the major league level in June 2007. He made his major league debut on June 8, 2007, against the Cleveland Indians. At the time of his debut, Bailey was the youngest player in the National League. Bailey pitched two no-hitters in his career. On February 19, 2014, Bailey signed a six-year, $105 million contract with the Reds.

== Early life ==
David Dewitt "Homer" Bailey Jr. was born on May 3, 1986, in La Grange, Texas. Bailey, nicknamed "Homer" after his great-grandfather, attended La Grange High School in La Grange, Texas. During La Grange's 2004 baseball season, Bailey won 15 games and lost none. Additionally, he had a 0.68 earned run average (ERA) and 201 strikeouts in 92 2/3 innings pitched. That year, USA Today, named Bailey as a member of the USA Today All-USA high school baseball team and their High School National Player of the Year. Bailey completed his high school career with 41 wins, 4 losses, a 0.98 ERA, and 536 strikeouts in 298 innings pitched.

== Professional career ==
=== Draft and minor leagues ===
In 2004, the Cincinnati Reds selected Bailey with the seventh pick in the Major League Baseball amateur draft. In 2004, Bailey made his professional debut with the Gulf Coast Reds, a Rookie Class franchise in the Gulf Coast League. That season, Bailey appeared in six games, started three, and lost his only decision for the GCL Reds.

In 2005, the Reds promoted Bailey to the Dayton Dragons, the Reds' Class A franchise in the Midwest League. Bailey appeared in 28 games that season and compiled a record of 8–4. After the season, Baseball America named Bailey as the second-best prospect in the Midwest League.

In 2006, the Reds promoted Bailey to the Sarasota Reds, their Advanced Class-A franchise in the Florida State League. Although he won just three games and lost five, Baseball America named him as the best prospect in the Florida State League. After 13 appearances, the Reds promoted Bailey to the Chattanooga Lookouts, their affiliate in the Double-A Southern League.

While at Chattanooga, Bailey put up the best statistics of his minor league career. He won seven games, lost just one, and had a 1.59 ERA in 13 games. Additionally, in 68 innings, he struck out 77 batters. As a result, Bailey averaged in excess of 10 strikeouts per nine innings while with each of his last three minor league teams.

In 2007, Bailey appeared in three spring training games for the Reds. He lost his only decision and had a 19.64 ERA when the Reds sent him to their minor league camp on March 16. He started the regular season with the Louisville Bats, the Reds' Triple-A affiliate in the International League. Bailey was touted as the best prospect in the Reds farm system, and one of the best pitching prospects in baseball. In early June 2007, the Reds called up Bailey to make his debut against the Cleveland Indians.

=== Cincinnati Reds (2007–2018) ===
==== 2007 ====
On June 8, 2007, Bailey made his major league debut as the starting pitcher for the Cincinnati Reds in their home game at Great American Ball Park, an interleague game against the Cleveland Indians. In that game, Bailey pitched five innings, allowing two runs on five hits and four walks with three strikeouts, and qualifying for the win. On July 8, 2007, the Reds sent Bailey down to Triple-A Louisville. On September 20, 2007, Bailey returned to the Reds to pitch 5 2/3 innings against the Giants. Bailey gave up one run on three hits and a walk, while striking out three for his third win of the season. In nine starts, Bailey finished 2007 in the majors 4–2 with a 5.67 ERA.

==== 2008 ====
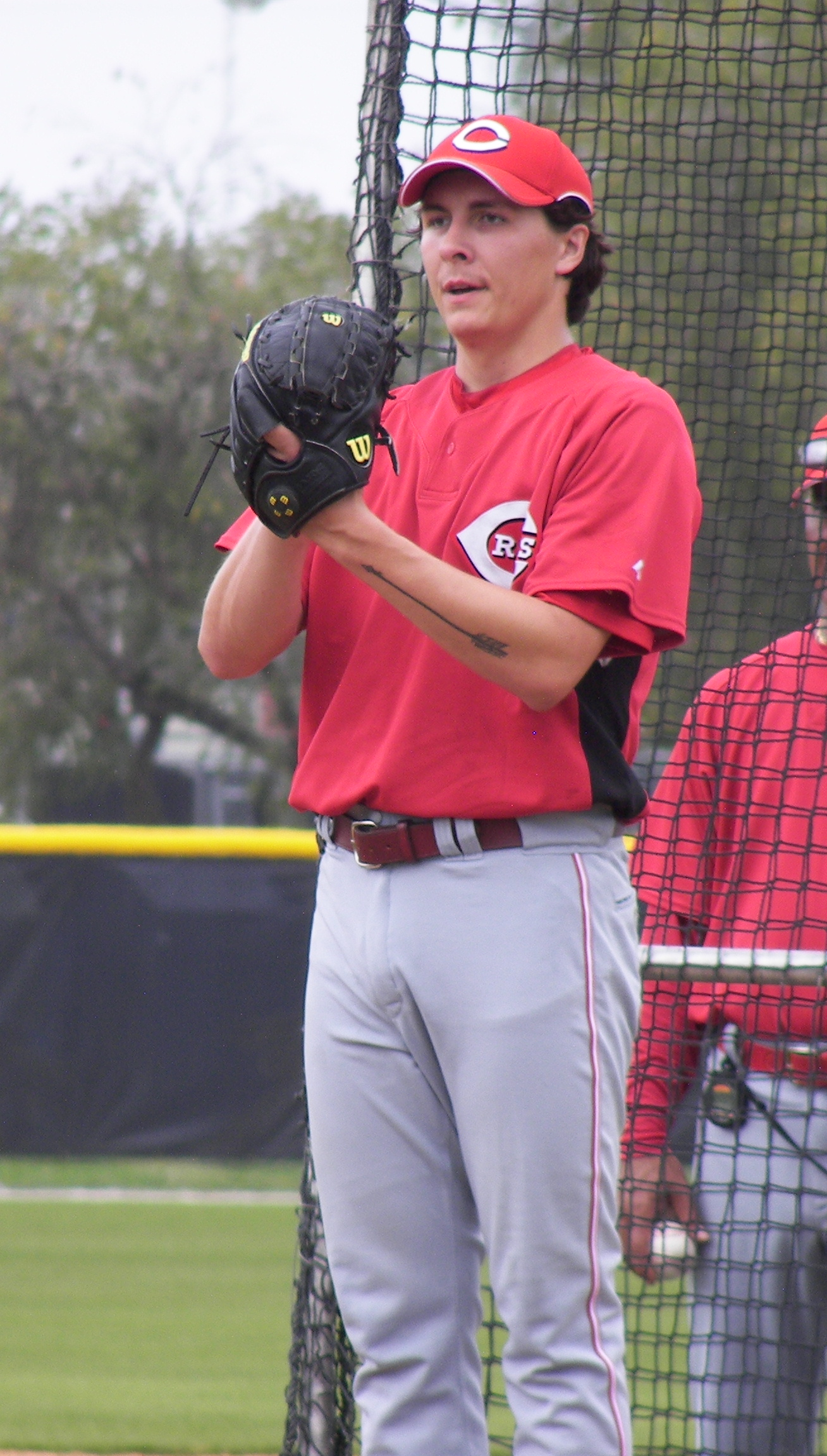
Bailey during spring training in 2008

On March 26, 2008, the Reds optioned Bailey to Louisville to start the season. On June 5, 2008, Bailey was called up to join the Reds' rotation. On June 18, 2008, the Reds optioned Bailey back to Louisville after he went 0–3 with an 8.76 ERA in his three starts and called up Daryl Thompson On July 11, 2008, Bailey returned to the Reds, to pitch against the Milwaukee Brewers, replacing the injured Aaron Harang. In eight starts, Bailey went 0–6 with a 7.93 ERA to close out the 2008 season in the majors.

==== 2009 ====
Bailey began the 2009 season with the Triple-A Louisville Bats after failing to earn a spot on the Reds' roster.

On May 23, 2009, Bailey made a spot start for the Reds. Regardless of his performance, he was going to be sent back down to Triple-A Louisville. After being sent back down Bailey shut down Triple-A hitters, holding hitters to an ERA well below 2.00 over his next six starts. On June 27, Bailey was recalled and again faced the Cleveland Indians. Despite walking seven batters Bailey picked up the win. One start later Bailey shut down the St. Louis Cardinals for 7.1 innings. The two runs charged to Bailey were a result of a grand-slam given up by reliever David Weathers.

Being considered a "can't miss prospect", Bailey's first two seasons with the Reds were seen as disappointing, and the 2009 season did not start off much better. As the season progressed, however, Bailey began to be more effective, allowing three runs or less in his final nine starts. He finished the 2009 season with a 4.53 ERA in 113 1/3 innings.

==== 2010 ====
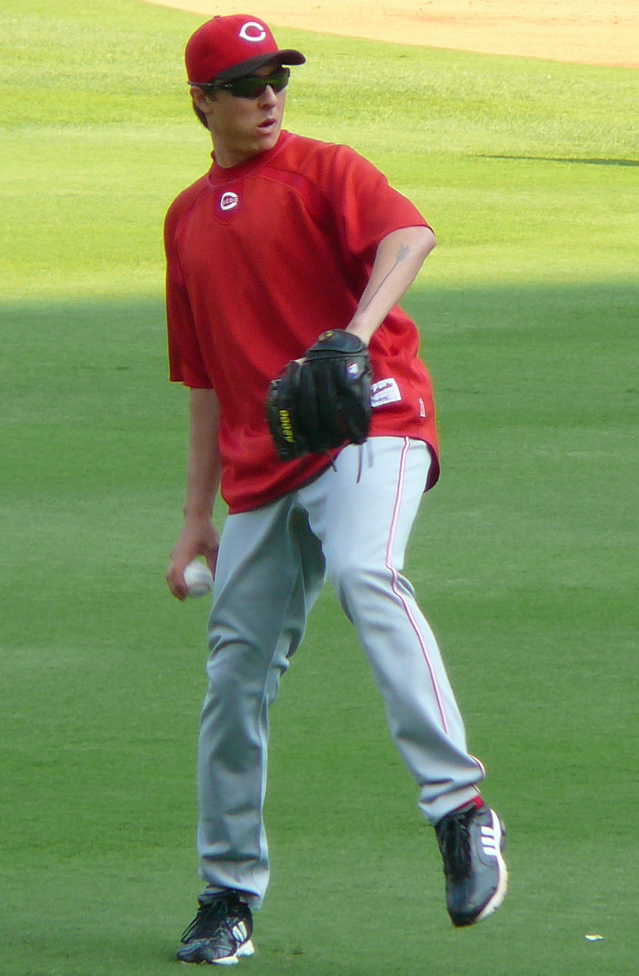
Bailey with the Reds in 2009

Bailey made the Reds out of spring training in 2010. He ended up on the disabled list with shoulder inflammation in May. During his rehabilitation, the Reds considered moving Bailey to the bullpen but after a solid start against the Florida Marlins, the Reds chose to move Mike Leake to the bullpen to keep Bailey in the rotation. Bailey finished the 2010 year going 4–3 with a 4.46 ERA in 19 starts.

==== 2011–2012 ====
In 2011, Bailey made 22 starts going 9–7 with a 4.43 ERA.

On September 28, 2012, Bailey pitched the first no-hitter at PNC Park, and the 15th in Reds history, in a 1–0 road victory over the Pittsburgh Pirates. Bailey struck out ten on 115 pitches, allowing only one walk to Andrew McCutchen in the seventh, while Pirates shortstop Clint Barmes reached first base on an error by Reds third baseman Scott Rolen in the third inning. The game was the first no-hitter for the Reds since Tom Browning's perfect game on September 16, 1988, and the first thrown against the Pirates since Bob Gibson on August 14, 1971. Bailey finished the 2012 season pitching 208 innings with 168 strikeouts, a 13–10 record, and a 3.68 ERA.

==== 2013 ====
On July 2, 2013, Bailey pitched a 3–0 no-hitter against the San Francisco Giants at Great American Ball Park, besting Tim Lincecum—himself a no-hit pitcher only eleven days later. It was the third time in history, and the first time since Nolan Ryan did it in 1974–75, that the same pitcher had the final no-hitter of one season and the first no-hitter of the following season. It was also the seventh time in history, and again the first time since Nolan Ryan in 1975, that two no-hitters in a row were accredited to the same pitcher. Bailey was perfect through six innings when he walked Gregor Blanco with a full count in the seventh. He retired the next nine batters in order, missing a perfect game by only that one pitch. Later in that inning, Bailey was bailed out by Joey Votto when Buster Posey hit a sharp ground ball to first. Bailey was late to cover first where Posey most likely would have been safe. Votto realizing this, threw the ball to third where he got Gregor Blanco. Had Blanco made it to third, Posey would have gotten a hit when the play ended up being a fielder's choice. Bailey became the third Reds pitcher, along with Jim Maloney and Johnny Vander Meer (who'd done it in consecutive starts), to have more than one career no-hitter. Bailey finished the 2013 year going 11–12 with a 3.49 ERA, 199 strikeouts in 209 innings pitched.

Notably, Bailey threw his no-hitter in the MLB Network Showcase game, with Reds legend Sean Casey in the booth.

==== 2014 ====
Bailey's 2014 season was injury-shortened, as he was diagnosed with arm fatigue, and finished the year 9–5 with a 3.71 ERA.

==== 2015 ====
Still dealing with forearm fatigue, Bailey began the 2015 season on the disabled list. On May 1, 2015, it was revealed that his right elbow was diagnosed with a torn UCL, requiring Tommy John surgery, and it prematurely ended his 2015 season.

==== 2016 ====
Bailey's return to the Reds was purposefully stalled after he felt pain during a rehab stint at the Reds' AA affiliate in Pensacola. After many setbacks and rehabilitation, Bailey made his return to the mound for the Reds on July 31, more than a year since his last start.

==== 2017 ====
On February 8, 2017, Bailey underwent surgery on his right elbow to remove bone spurs. Recovery time required four to six weeks. He made his season debut on June 24 pitching 1 2/3 innings and allowing eight runs. Bailey finished the season with a 6.43 ERA in 18 starts.

==== 2018 ====
Bailey began 1–7 the 2018 season with an ERA of 6.68 in 12 starts before being placed on the disabled list with right knee inflammation. On September 7, 2018, Bailey was removed from the rotation after nine straight losses; his record on the season was 1–14 at that point and he had an ERA of 6.09 in 20 starts.

On December 21, 2018, the Reds traded Bailey to the Los Angeles Dodgers with Jeter Downs and Josiah Gray for Matt Kemp, Yasiel Puig, Alex Wood, Kyle Farmer, and cash considerations. The Dodgers released Bailey the same day.

=== Kansas City Royals (2019) ===
On February 9, 2019, Bailey signed a minor-league contract with the Kansas City Royals that included an invitation to spring training. Bailey made the team and had his contract selected on April 3.

=== Oakland Athletics (2019) ===
On July 14, 2019, Bailey was traded to the Oakland Athletics for minor-league infielder Kevin Merrell. He became a free agent at the end of the season.

=== Minnesota Twins (2020) ===
On December 31, 2019, Bailey signed a one-year contract with the Minnesota Twins. On July 28, 2020, Bailey made his Twins debut, earning his first victory over the Cardinals. Days after being activated from an IL stint, Bailey was designated for assignment by the Twins on September 25. He was released on September 26.

=== Oakland Athletics ===
On June 22, 2021, Bailey signed a minor league contract with the Oakland Athletics organization. He was assigned to the Triple-A Las Vegas Aviators to begin the year. In 15 starts split between Las Vegas and the rookie-level Arizona Complex League Athletics, Bailey struggled to a 2–8 record and 7.39 ERA with 62 strikeouts over 56 innings of work. He elected free agency following the season on November 7.

== US National Team ==
In May 2021, Bailey was named to the roster of the United States national baseball team for the Americas Qualifying Event.

== Pitching style ==
Bailey had a four-seam fastball, and a two-seam fastball, in the 93–96 mph range. He threw three breaking balls; a slider, a curveball, and a splitter.

== Philanthropy ==
In 2008, Homer Bailey released a charity wine called "Homer Bailey's Chardonnay" with 100% of his proceeds supporting Outdoors Without Limits, an organization committed to help reduce the barriers that prevent disabled people from enjoying the outdoors.

Achievements
Preceded by Félix Hernández; Himself	No-hitter pitcher September 28, 2012; July 2, 2013	Succeeded by Himself; Tim Lincecum
