= Wilkin Castillo =

Dominican baseball player (born 1984)

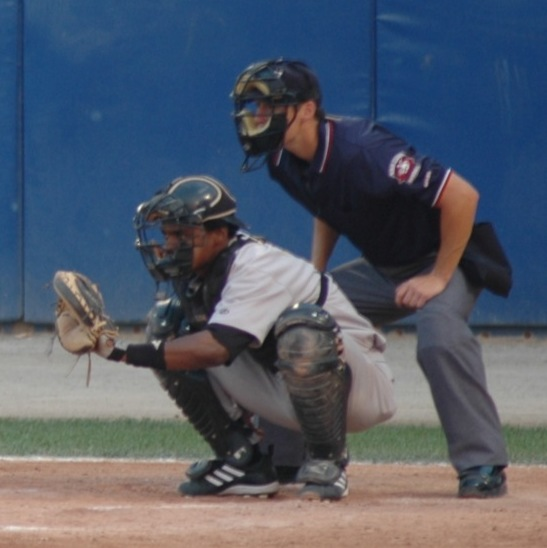
- Castillo with the South Bend Silver Hawks in 2005
- Catcher
- Born: June 1, 1984 (age 41); Baní, Dominican Republic
- Batted: Switch Threw: Right

MLB debut
- September 2, 2008, for the Cincinnati Reds

Last MLB appearance
- June 25, 2019, for the Miami Marlins

MLB statistics
- Batting average: .286
- Home runs: 0
- Runs batted in: 4
- Stats at Baseball Reference

Teams
- As player: Cincinnati Reds (2008–2009); Miami Marlins (2019); As coach: Oakland Athletics (2023–2024)

Wilkin Alexis Castillo (born June 1, 1984) is a Dominican former professional baseball catcher. He played in Major League Baseball (MLB) for the Cincinnati Reds and Miami Marlins. He made his MLB debut with Cincinnati in 2008. Listed at 6 feet 0 inches (1.83 m) and 215 pounds (98 kg), Castillo throws right-handed and is a switch hitter.

== Professional career ==
=== Arizona Diamondbacks ===
Castillo was originally signed as an undrafted free agent in 2002 by the Arizona Diamondbacks. He first played in Arizona's farm system in 2004, mostly in the rookie-level Pioneer League, while also appearing in six Triple-A games. He spent 2005 playing in Single–A and spent 2006 in High–A, Double-A, and Triple-A. In 2007, he played for the Double-A Mobile BayBears where he had a .302 batting average in 109 games. In 2008, Castillo was named the 14th-best prospect in the Diamondbacks organization, and played 104 games in Triple-A for the Tucson Sidewinders of the Pacific Coast League, batting .254 with six home runs and 47 RBI.

=== Cincinnati Reds ===
On August 14, 2008, Castillo was sent to the Cincinnati Reds as a part of the Adam Dunn trade, which took place August 11. On September 1, he was called up and made his MLB debut the following day against the Pittsburgh Pirates, flying out to left in his one at-bat as a pinch hitter. His first hit was on September 3, a single to right field off T. J. Beam of the Pirates, also as a pinch hitter. Castillo played in 18 MLB games in 2008, with 9 hits in 32 at-bats for a .281 average. He began the 2009 season with the Triple-A Louisville Bats after failing to earn a spot on the Reds' roster. On June 20, he was called up to the Reds and appeared in four games with two hits in three at-bats. He played in a total of 22 games with the Reds over the two seasons, with 11 hits in 35 at-bats for a .314 average.

=== Atlanta Braves ===
On November 22, 2010, Castillo signed a minor league contract with the Atlanta Braves that included an invitation to spring training. He spent the 2011 season with the Triple-A Gwinnett Braves, recording a slash line of .262/.285/.366 with five home runs and 37 RBI in 80 games.

=== Colorado Rockies ===
On December 16, 2011, Castillo signed a minor league contract with the Colorado Rockies and played in Triple-A for the Colorado Springs Sky Sox, slashing .253/.273/.365 with four home runs and 34 RBI in 74 games.

=== Vaqueros Laguna ===
On November 21, 2012, Castillo signed a minor league deal with the Los Angeles Dodgers. The Dodgers released him at the end of spring training.

On May 24, 2013, Castillo was signed to the Mexican League Triple-A Vaqueros Laguna team. In 51 games he hit .378/.419/.562 with six home runs and 28 RBI.

=== Toros de Tijuana ===
On April 1, 2014, Castillo was traded to the Toros de Tijuana. He was released on April 12. In eight games he hit .182/.206/.273 with no home runs and three RBI.

=== Broncos de Reynosa ===
On May 28, 2014, Castillo signed with the Broncos de Reynosa of the Mexican League. In 25 appearances for the Broncos, he slashed .215/.284/.333 with two home runs and eight RBI. Castillo was released by Reynosa on July 1.

=== Pittsburgh Pirates ===
On January 30, 2015, Castillo signed a minor league contract with the Pittsburgh Pirates organization. In 21 games for the Triple–A Indianapolis Indians, he hit .250/.380/.300 with two RBI and one stolen base. Castillo elected free agency on November 6.

=== Toronto Blue Jays ===
On February 26, 2016, Castillo signed a minor league contract with the Toronto Blue Jays organization. In 51 games split between the Double–A New Hampshire Fisher Cats and Triple–A Buffalo Bisons, he batted a combined .229/.271/.312 with one home run, 12 RBI, and two stolen bases. Castillo elected free agency following the season on November 7.

=== New York Yankees ===
On January 7, 2017, Castillo signed a minor league contract with the New York Yankees. He played in 59 games split between the Double–A Trenton Thunder and Triple–A Scranton/Wilkes-Barre RailRiders, accumulating a .196/.243/.286 batting line with three home runs and 13 RBI. Castillo elected free agency following the season on November 6.

=== Long Island Ducks ===
On March 27, 2018, Castillo signed with the Long Island Ducks of the independent Atlantic League of Professional Baseball. In 20 games he hit .314/.400/.486 with two home runs and 12 RBI.

=== New York Yankees (second stint) ===
On May 24, 2018, Castillo's contract was purchased by the New York Yankees organization. In 41 games for the Triple–A Scranton/Wilkes-Barre Rail Riders, he hit .250/.277/.353 with two home runs and 13 RBI. Castillo elected free agency following the season on November 2.

=== Miami Marlins ===
On February 28, 2019, Castillo signed a minor league contract with the Miami Marlins. He opened the 2019 season with the New Orleans Baby Cakes. His contract was selected by the Marlins on June 21. The next day, in his first MLB game in 10 years and two days, Castillo hit a go-ahead two-run double in a Marlins 5–3 win over the Philadelphia Phillies. On September 3, Castillo was designated for assignment. He elected free agency on October 14, 2019.

On July 31, 2020, Castillo re-signed with the Marlins organization on a minor league contract. He did not play in a game in 2020 due to the cancellation of the minor league season because of the COVID-19 pandemic. Castillo was released by the Marlins on August 18.

== Post-playing career ==
Castillo was the bullpen catcher for the Oakland Athletics during the 2023 and 2024 seasons. On February 5, 2025, Castillo was hired to serve as the manager of the Dominican Summer League Athletics.
