= Bill Bray =

American baseball player (born 1983)

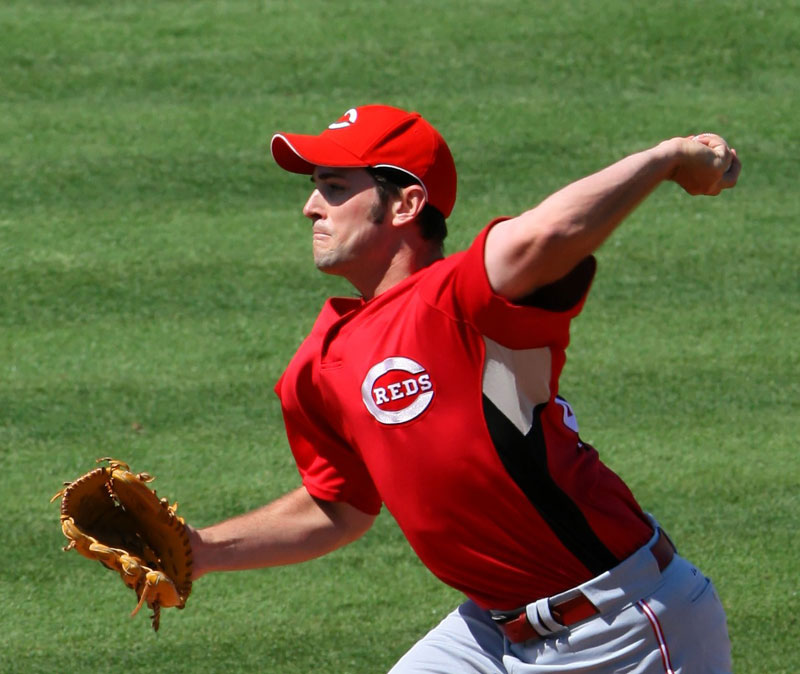
- During his tenure with the Cincinnati Reds
- Relief pitcher
- Born: June 5, 1983 (age 43); Virginia Beach, Virginia, U.S.
- Batted: Left Threw: Left

MLB debut
- June 3, 2006, for the Washington Nationals

Last MLB appearance
- July 30, 2012, for the Cincinnati Reds

MLB statistics
- Win–loss record: 13–12
- Earned run average: 3.74
- Strikeouts: 188
- Stats at Baseball Reference

Teams
- Washington Nationals (2006); Cincinnati Reds (2006–2008, 2010–2012)

William Paul Bray (born June 5, 1983) is an American former professional baseball pitcher. He played in Major League Baseball (MLB) for the Washington Nationals and Cincinnati Reds. After retiring from baseball, he became an attorney.

== Amateur career ==
A native of Virginia Beach, Virginia, Bray attended Ocean Lakes High School in Virginia Beach. He is a graduate of the College of William & Mary. In 2003, he played collegiate summer baseball for the Orleans Cardinals of the Cape Cod Baseball League.

== Professional career ==
=== Montreal Expos/Washington Nationals ===
The left-handed William Bray was the 13th overall selection in the 2004 draft by the former Montreal Expos franchise which relocated to Washington, D.C. and was renamed the Washington Nationals.

Bray made his Major League debut on June 3, 2006, against the Milwaukee Brewers in Milwaukee. On the first pitch he threw in relief of Gary Majewski in the eighth inning, Brian Schneider threw out Corey Koskie attempting to steal second base to end the inning. Schneider hit a go-ahead home run in the ninth inning, Chad Cordero came in to earn the save and Bray was credited with a win in his debut with just one pitch thrown and without retiring a batter.

=== Cincinnati Reds ===
Just over a month into his MLB career, on July 13, 2006, Bray, along with infielders Royce Clayton and Brendan Harris, reliever Gary Majewski, and starter Daryl Thompson were traded to the Cincinnati Reds for outfielder Austin Kearns, infielder Felipe Lopez, and pitcher Ryan Wagner.

Bray began the 2009 season with the Triple-A Louisville Bats after failing to earn a spot on the Reds' roster. After only a few games in Louisville, Bray underwent Tommy John surgery to repair his left elbow and missed the rest of the year. Bray was called up to the Reds from Triple-A Louisville June 27, 2010. He made his 2010 debut with the Reds on June 28, pitching one inning against the Philadelphia Phillies.

In six seasons with the Reds, with 2008 and 2011 being his best, Bray had a 12–11 record, 3.72 ERA, and 172 strikeouts in 174 1/3 innings in 258 appearances. On November 8, 2012, Bray elected free agency after a disappointing 2012 season, in which he only pitched in 14 games.

=== Washington Nationals (second stint) ===
On November 28, 2012, Bray returned to the Nationals on a minor league contract. He went to spring training with the Nationals, but on March 4, 2013, he was cut and sent to the team's minor league camp. He pitched 15 games for the Double-A Harrisburg Senators in 2013, returning to free agency on November 4.

Bray announced his retirement on Twitter on March 16, 2014.

== Coaching career ==
In 2015, Bray returned to Orleans of the Cape Cod League to serve as the pitching coach for his former team.

== Personal ==
Bray and his wife, Elaine, were married on December 2, 2006. They have three daughters and one son.

Following baseball, he returned to William & Mary to finish his undergraduate degree in finance. He graduated in May 2015. He then attend William & Mary Law School, graduating in 2018. He subsequently began practicing real estate law.

In 2012, Bray shaved his head in an effort to raise funds for pediatric cancer.

Bray wrote for several articles for The Sporting News in 2014 and 2015.

While playing, Bray was the Reds representative for the MLB Players Association and later served on the board of directors for Major League Alumni Marketing.
