= Gary Majewski =

American baseball player (born 1980)

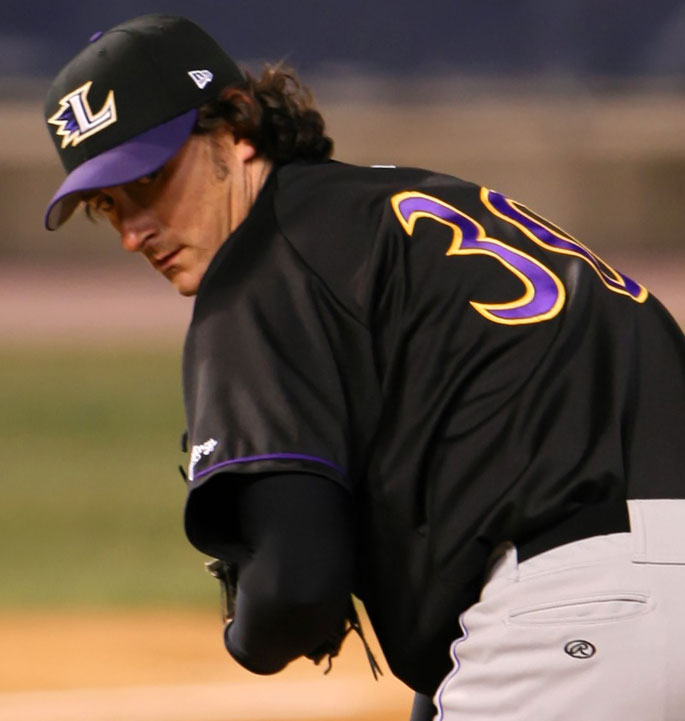
- Majewski with the Louisville Bats
- Relief pitcher
- Born: February 26, 1980 (age 46); Houston, Texas, U.S.
- Batted: Right Threw: Right

MLB debut
- August 26, 2004, for the Montreal Expos

Last MLB appearance
- July 20, 2010, for the Houston Astros

MLB statistics
- Win–loss record: 9–13
- Earned run average: 4.75
- Strikeouts: 143
- Stats at Baseball Reference

Teams
- Montreal Expos / Washington Nationals (2004–2006); Cincinnati Reds (2006–2008); Houston Astros (2010)

Gary Wayne Majewski (/məˈdʒɛski/; born February 26, 1980) is an American former professional baseball pitcher. He played in Major League Baseball (MLB) for the Montreal Expos/Washington Nationals, Cincinnati Reds, and Houston Astros.

== Career ==
Majewski graduated in 1998 from St. Pius X High School in Houston, where he was unanimously selected for Houston Player of the Year for his achievement of maintaining a 1.64 ERA and a 14–3 record. With that, he led his team to the state championship in Class 5A TAPPS.

In the majors, Majewski had an ERA of 2.93 and 4 wins and 4 losses during the 2005 season. In his career, he pitched 242.1 innings.

Majewski was traded by the Washington Nationals to the Cincinnati Reds along with Bill Bray, Royce Clayton, and Brendan Harris for Austin Kearns, Felipe López, and Ryan Wagner. The trade caused some controversy, as the Reds front office was apparently unaware of cortisone shots which had been given to Majewski due to arm pain before the trade. It was alleged that Majewski was known to be injured by Washington general manager Jim Bowden and the trade was an attempt to dump him for some value to an unsuspecting team. Majewski performed well during his time with the Nationals, with a 2.93 ERA in 2005 and a 3.58 ERA with Washington up until he was traded.

Majewski had very little success with the Reds, with a 7.28 ERA in parts of three seasons. He was not re-signed after the 2008 season and pitched in only two games in the Major Leagues thereafter. A grievance was filed with MLB alleging misconduct by Jim Bowden and the Washington Nationals. However, MLB never revealed their findings and no punishment is on record.

On December 23, 2008, Majewski signed a minor league contract with the Philadelphia Phillies.

In December 2009 Majewski signed a minor league contract with the Houston Astros. On July 18, 2010, he was purchased from Triple-A Round Rock then was designated for assignment on July 21.

In March 2012 Majewski was signed by the Sugar Land Skeeters, an American professional baseball team based in Sugar Land, Texas. He pitched in 56 games for the Skeeters during the 2012 season, compiling an ERA of 3.37.
