= 2008 St. Louis Cardinals season =

Major League Baseball season

2008 St. Louis Cardinals
- League: National League
- Division: Central
- Ballpark: Busch Stadium
- City: St. Louis, Missouri
- Record: 86–76 (.531)
- Divisional place: 4th
- Owners: William DeWitt, Jr., Fred Hanser
- General managers: John Mozeliak
- Managers: Tony La Russa
- Television: FSN Midwest (Dan McLaughlin, Al Hrabosky); KSDK (NBC 5) (Jay Randolph, Rick Horton)
- Radio: KTRS (Mike Shannon, John Rooney)

The 2008 St. Louis Cardinals season was the 127th season for the St. Louis Cardinals, a Major League Baseball franchise in St. Louis, Missouri. It was the 117th season for the Cardinals in the National League and their 3rd at Busch Stadium III.

The Cardinals, coming off a 78–84 season in 2007 their worst since 1999, improved by eight games, going 86–76 in 2008. However, this was only good for fourth place in the National League Central, 11.5 games behind the division champion Chicago Cubs.

== Offseason departures and acquisitions ==
=== Front office ===
Walt Jocketty, GM of the Cardinals for twelve years, was fired due to "tension mounting" that had "grown counterproductive ... with respect to some baseball issues." Tony La Russa, however, signed a contract to return to manage the Cardinals for his 13th and 14th seasons. John Mozeliak took Jocketty's place as GM. John Abbamondi, former senior director of labor economics working for Major League Baseball in New York, joined the Cardinals as assistant GM.

On March 13, it was announced that Mark Lamping, president of the Cardinals for 13 years, resigned to become the CEO of the New Meadowlands Stadium Company. Bill DeWitt III, son of Cardinals chairman William DeWitt, Jr. and formerly the team's vice-president of business development, took Lamping's place as president.

=== Hitters ===
A major offseason story for the Cardinals was the hostile relationship between manager Tony La Russa and third baseman Scott Rolen. LaRussa publicly criticized Rolen on December 5, and Rolen requested a trade, but the team was unable to find a suitable offer at the winter meetings. On January 12, the Cardinals reached a tentative agreement with the Toronto Blue Jays to trade Rolen for their third baseman, Troy Glaus, and the trade was finalized on January 14.

Center fielder Jim Edmonds, the most senior member of the Cardinals' roster, having been with the team since the 2000 season, was traded to the San Diego Padres for single-A third baseman David Freese and cash considerations on December 14, 2007.

So Taguchi, backup outfielder and the only Japanese player in franchise history, was released by the Cardinals in December after six seasons with the organization. The Cardinals declined to offer arbitration to shortstop David Eckstein and acquired César Izturis as his replacement. St. Louis acquired Jason LaRue to be the backup catcher, replacing Gary Bennett. The Cardinals took outfielder Brian Barton from Cleveland on December 6 in the Rule 5 draft.

Utility player Scott Spiezio was released by the Cardinals on February 27 after California authorities issued a warrant for his arrest on charges that included hit-and-run, drunk driving and assault. Spiezio had previously missed a month of the 2007 season to go on rehab for drug abuse problems.

In spring training, LaRussa confirmed that he would continue to bat the pitcher eighth after the Cardinals adopted the unconventional lineup for the last two months of the 2007 season.

=== Pitchers ===
Starting pitcher Kip Wells, who posted a 5.70 ERA in 2007, departed via free agency. Starting pitcher Joel Piñeiro, effective for the Cardinals in 2007 after a late-season trade from Boston, signed a two-year deal to remain with the team.

On January 3, St. Louis signed starting pitcher Matt Clement, a former All-Star who missed the entire 2007 season after undergoing shoulder surgery. However, Clement's rehab went slowly and he was not ready for Opening Day.

Concerned over health issues in the rotation, with Clement not ready and Piñeiro suffering from shoulder pain, St. Louis signed another free agent, starting pitcher Kyle Lohse, to a one-year contract on March 14.

== Regular season ==
The Cardinals were 17-10-2 in Grapefruit League play with a .286 team batting average (5th in NL) and a 4.01 ERA (4th in NL). Attendance at Roger Dean Stadium was 92,465 in 16 home games (9-5-2) for an average home attendance of 5,779. In 13 road games (8-5-0), attendance 85,655; road average 6,589. Their overall Spring training record was 19-11-2. St. Louis started the season with three players--Brian Barton, Kyle McClellan, and Rico Washington – who were making their big-league debuts. Only nine players on the Opening Day roster – Yadier Molina, Albert Pujols, Chris Duncan, Aaron Miles, Randy Flores, Anthony Reyes, Adam Wainwright, Braden Looper and Brad Thompson – were on the roster of the 2006 World Series champion Cardinals. With a pitching rotation in flux and many long-time Cardinals off to other teams, and coming off a losing season, most experts picked St. Louis to play poorly again in 2008.

=== April ===
Opening Day, scheduled for March 31, was postponed to April 1 due to rain after the Cards and Rockies had played 2½ innings. The rain wiped out an Albert Pujols home run. In the make-up game, St. Louis lost 2-1, with a Yadier Molina home run the only offense. After the opening loss the Cardinals won the other five games on their home stand; the 5-1 start marked the first time since 2006 that the Cardinals had been more than one game above .500. St. Louis finished the month of April with an 18-11 record and in sole possession of first place in the NL Central. Albert Pujols reached base safely in all 29 games for the month. Staff ace Adam Wainwright finished the month 3-1 with a 2.79 ERA. Jason Isringhausen had nine saves in April. However, new third baseman Troy Glaus ended April hitting only .260 and had only one home run for the month.

=== May ===
May opened with St. Louis' first series of the year against their arch-rival and the preseason NL Central favorite Chicago Cubs, with the Cardinals winning two of three games to stay atop the NL Central standings. Pujols continued to get on base: on May 6 he reached base safely for the 34th consecutive game since the start of the season, the longest such streak in MLB since 1999.

Jason Isringhausen struggled mightily as Cardinal closer in late April and early May, blowing four saves and taking three losses between April 25 and May 9. His ERA rose from 4.50 to 7.47 during that span. After Isringhausen's fifth blown save of the season on May 9, LaRussa announced that Isringhausen would no longer be closing games and instead the Cardinals would be adopting a closer-by-committee approach. Ryan Franklin received the first save opportunity after LaRussa's decision. On May 16, Isringhausen was placed on the 15-day disabled list with a right hand laceration. Josh Kinney was transferred to the 60-day disabled list (from the 15-day list) to make room for highly touted prospect Chris Perez, who was called up from Memphis. Finally, on May 17, Manager La Russa officially designated Ryan Franklin as his closer.

Albert Pujols' on-base streak was snapped at 42 games when he failed to reach safely in a 3-1 loss to the Tampa Bay Rays on May 16. It was six games shy of his career-best 48 games in a row on base, set in his rookie season of 2001. The loss was the eighth in ten games for the Cardinals, a stretch that dropped them into second place behind the Cubs.

In late May, Piñeiro went to the DL and rookie Mike Parisi took his spot in the rotation. Chris Duncan, slumping all year after offseason hernia surgery, followed him to the DL, with Joe Mather getting the callup. Parisi and Mather were the fifth and sixth players to make their big-league debut with the 2008 Cardinals, following Brian Barton, Kyle McClellan, Rico Washington and Chris Perez. After slumping in the middle of the month, the Cardinals got hot at the end of May, going 15-13 for the month. They remained in second place behind the Cubs. Todd Wellemeyer was named NL Pitcher of the Month after going 4-0 with a 2.19 ERA in May.

=== June ===
On June 1, pitcher Mark Worrell got called up; he became the seventh rookie to make his MLB debut with the Cardinals in 2008. On June 5, Worrell hit a home run in his first big-league at-bat, the eight Cardinal in franchise history to do so. On June 6, Mitchell Boggs followed Worrell to the big leagues as the eighth rookie to make his debut with the 2008 Cardinals; fellow rookie Parisi was sent down to make room.

Troy Glaus began to find his power stroke, hitting four home runs between May 31 and June 5 after hitting only two in the first two months of the season. Ryan Ludwick, who never hit more than 14 home runs in a season prior to 2008, hit his 15th home run on June 10.

The Cardinals suffered a serious setback on June 9, when staff ace Adam Wainwright went to the DL with a sprained finger. The injury situation became even worse on June 10, when Albert Pujols strained his left calf muscle running from home on a ground ball, sending him to the disabled list for only the second time in his eight-year career. Meanwhile, former closer Jason Isringhausen made his return from the disabled list on June 14, with the club intending to use him in middle relief.

On June 20 the Cardinals traveled to Boston for a three-game set with the Red Sox; it was St. Louis' first trip to Fenway since the 2004 World Series. They won two of three in Boston. Nick Stavinoha, called up on June 22 after Izturis went on the DL, became the ninth player to make his big-league debut with the 2008 Cardinals.

Albert Pujols was activated from the disabled list on June 26. The Cardinals went 6-7 in his absence. In Pujols' first game back he got four hits, but the Cardinals lost 3-2 to the Tigers after closer Franklin blew the save in the bottom of the 9th and Mike Parisi issued a bases-loaded walk in the bottom of the 10th. The loss was part of a season-long trend of bullpen failures and blowups. It was the 19th blown save and 18th loss for Cardinal relievers, as opposed to 11 blown saves and 12 losses for the bullpen in all of 2007.

Mark Mulder, who had pitched only sporadically for the Cardinals since undergoing shoulder surgery in 2006, was activated on June 27 and sent to the bullpen. In his first appearance, on June 30, he threw a scoreless ninth inning against the New York Mets.

Despite Pujols (June 11–25) and Wainwright (June 9-?) both going on the DL in June, the Cardinals went 15-12 for the month.

=== July ===
The Fourth of July weekend brought a showdown series in St. Louis between the Cardinals (49-38) and Cubs (51-35) with the Cardinals 2.5 games behind Chicago. It was the first meeting between the teams since the first week of May. On July 4, Albert Pujols (aged 28 years, 170 days), became the fifth-youngest player to hit his 300th home run, but the Cardinals lost 2-1. On July 5, a crowd of 46,865, the biggest ever in the short history of the new Busch Stadium, saw St. Louis score three in the bottom of the 9th against ace closer Kerry Wood to beat Chicago 5-4. It was the first time in 33 games in 2008 where the Cardinals had won a game when trailing after eight innings. The Cubs won the rubber game 7-1 to take a 3½ game lead in the Central Division. The three-game series set a new attendance record of 140,067 at the new Busch Stadium.

On July 6, Albert Pujols and Ryan Ludwick were named as the Cardinal representatives to the National League All-Star Team. Ludwick, who had never hit more than 14 home runs in a season before 2008, entered the break with 21 homers, leading the team.

Mark Mulder's comeback ended when, in his first start since September 2007, he suffered pain in his throwing shoulder on July 9 and had to leave the game after only 16 pitches against the Philadelphia Phillies. He was replaced on the roster by Jaime García, who debuted against the Pittsburgh Pirates on July 11, and became the 10th rookie to make his big-league debut with the 2008 Cardinals, the most since 13 rookies made their debut in 1997.

St. Louis entered the All-Star break with a 53-43 record, in second place in the NL Central and one-half game ahead of Milwaukee for the NL Wild Card. This was the second-best record in the National League, but it was also the product of St. Louis playing .500 baseball after reaching ten games over .500 in early May, at 22-12.

In their first series after the break, the Cardinals swept the Padres in four games to reach a season-high 14 games over .500 (57-43). They promptly were then swept by the Milwaukee Brewers in four games (Jul. 21–24) to return to only 10 games over .500 (57-47). Cardinal relief pitchers took the losses in all four games against Milwaukee, part of a season-long trend of ineffective to disastrous performances by the bullpen, then leading all of MLB in 23 games lost by the bullpen and 24 blown saves.

In a game against the NY Mets on July 26, the Cardinals snapped a five-game losing streak by winning 10-8 in 14 innings. Albert Pujols' game-winning home run was his first since he hit his 300th on July 4. Skip Schumaker had six singles in seven at-bats; he became the first Cardinal since Terry Moore in 1935 to have six base hits in one game. Pujols and Schumaker, meanwhile, were the first Cardinals' teammates with five or more hits apiece in a game since Charley Gelbert and Taylor Douthit each had five against the Cubs on May 16, 1930. The extra-inning affair was made necessary by Ryan Franklin's blown save, his second blown save in a row and third consecutive appearance with a home run allowed. On July 28, LaRussa gave the closer's job back to Isringhausen, who lost it to Franklin earlier in the year.

On July 30, 2005 Cy Young Award winner Chris Carpenter was re-activated from the 60-day disabled list, and started versus the Atlanta Braves, his first start since April 1, 2007. Operating on a pitch count not to exceed 80, Carpenter threw 67 pitches (36 for strikes) in four innings, and gave up one run and five hits (all singles), while walking two and striking out two.

The Cardinals made no trades at the July 31 non-waiver trading deadline. They went 13-14 in July, their first losing month of the season. They ended July (61-50), a fraction of a percentage point behind the Milwaukee Brewers for the NL Wild card spot.

=== August ===
On August 1, Isringhausen got his first save since May 5, as the Cardinals beat the Phillies, 6-3. On August 2, Matt Clement, signed in the offseason to fill out the rotation but unable to complete a comeback from injury, was released by the Cardinals without ever pitching for them.

Ryan Ludwick was named 'NL Player of the Week' for the week ending August 3, as he led the league with a .538 batting average, 14 hits, a .613 on-base percentage, 8 RBI and 27 total bases. He also hit four home runs and recorded a 1.038 slugging percentage.

On August 5, Brendan Ryan was optioned to (AAA) Memphis and the Cardinals signed free agent infielder Felipe López, who was released by the Washington Nationals on July 31.

Bullpen issues continued to dog St. Louis. On August 5, the Cardinals took a 4-0 lead into the top of ninth inning, only to have Villone, Isringhausen and Franklin combine to give up four runs to the Dodgers. It was the 27th blown save of the season for the Cardinal bullpen, worst in MLB. (The Cardinals eventually salvaged a 6-4 win when Ryan Ludwick hit a walk-off homer in extra innings.) After the game, the Cardinals announced that Isringhausen was again being removed from the closer's role. Chris Perez returned from the minor leagues and got the first save of his career; a five-out save as the Cardinals beat L.A. 9-6 on August 6.

Rick Ankiel was limited to pinch-hitting for 14 games at the end of July and the beginning of August due to an abdominal strain. Chris Carpenter suffered a physical setback with a strain in his right triceps and had to be removed after only 5.1 innings, trailing 1-0 against the Cubs on August 10. The Cardinals lost the game and two of three in the series. On August 15 Carpenter returned to the DL, diagnosed with a strained muscle in his shoulder. Brad Thompson started in Carpenter's place and won, while Chris Perez picked up his fourth save in four chances. August ended with the Astros sweeping the Cardinals in three at Houston, dropping them to 13-13 for the month and 74-63 for the season and leaving St. Louis a full six games behind Milwaukee in the loss column.

Jason Isringhausen's frustrating season came to a disappointing finish when he was diagnosed on August 19 with elbow tendinitis and a partially torn tendon. Meanwhile, staff ace Adam Wainwright, out since June 7 with a right middle finger sprain, made a triumphant return for the Cardinals on August 22, giving up only one run and five hits in six innings – and going 3-for-5 at the plate with an RBI, as St. Louis thrashed Atlanta 18-3 with 26 hits – 21 of them singles (5 doubles).

A crucial two-game series with Milwaukee August 26–27 ended in a split and with the Cardinals still four losses behind the Brewers in the race for the NL Wild Card. It ended the season series with the Brewers, which Milwaukee won 10 games to 5. August ended with the Astros sweeping the Cardinals in three in Houston. The Cardinals went 13-13 for the month and ended August six games behind Milwaukee in the loss column.

=== September ===
September opened on a particularly unpleasant note as the Cardinals blew a 5-1 lead against the Diamondbacks on September 1, losing 8-6. Stephen Drew of the D-backs hit for the cycle. The next day St. Louis promoted six players from Memphis as part of September call-ups. Included in the call-ups was Jason Motte, the 11th player to make his debut with the 2008 Cardinals.

A loss to the Cubs on September 10 dropped them into fourth place behind the surging Astros. That loss was the start of a season-high seven-game losing streak that saw the Cardinals officially eliminated in the NL Central race and fall out of wild-card contention. The losing streak was finally snapped on September 18 versus Cincinnati with the first save of Jason Motte's career. Rick Ankiel, slowed by a sports hernia, was shut down for the year on September 13.

The Cardinals finished the year on a high note, winning six in a row (their longest winning streak of the year) against Arizona and Cincinnati. They ended the season with an 86-76 record.

=== Season standings ===
NL Central
Team	W	L	Pct.	GB	Home	Road
Chicago Cubs	97	64	.602	—	55‍–‍26	42‍–‍38
Milwaukee Brewers	90	72	.556	7½	49‍–‍32	41‍–‍40
Houston Astros	86	75	.534	11	47‍–‍33	39‍–‍42
St. Louis Cardinals	86	76	.531	11½	46‍–‍35	40‍–‍41
Cincinnati Reds	74	88	.457	23½	43‍–‍38	31‍–‍50
Pittsburgh Pirates	67	95	.414	30½	39‍–‍42	28‍–‍53

=== Record vs. opponents ===
2008 National League record Source: MLB Standings Grid – 2008
Team	AZ	ATL	CHC	CIN	COL	FLA	HOU	LAD	MIL	NYM	PHI	PIT	SD	SF	STL	WAS	AL
Arizona	–	3–5	2–4	2–4	15–3	2–7	4–2	8–10	2–5	3–3	3–4	4–3	10–8	11–7	3–4	4–2	6–9
Atlanta	5–3	–	0–6	3–3	4–3	10–8	3–3	4–2	3–6	11–7	4–14	2–5	5–1	2–5	2–5	6–12	8–7
Chicago	4–2	6–0	–	8–7	5–1	4–3	8–9	5–2	9–7	4–2	3–4	14–4	5–2	4–3	9–6	3–3	6–9
Cincinnati	4–2	3–3	7–8	–	1–5	6–2	3–12	1–7	10–8	3–4	3–5	6–9	4–3	5–1	5–10	4–3	9–6
Colorado	3–15	3–4	1–5	5–1	–	5–3	3–3	8–10	4–3	3–6	0–5	5–2	9–9	11–7	3–4	4–3	7–8
Florida	7–2	8–10	3–4	2–6	3–5	–	4–2	3–4	5–1	8–10	10–8	3–2	4–2	3–3	2–5	14–3	5–10
Houston	2–4	3–3	9–8	12–3	3–3	2–4	–	4–3	7–8	5–2	3–4	8–8	3–3	7–1	7–8	4–2	7–11
Los Angeles	10–8	2–4	2–5	7–1	10–8	4–3	3–4	–	4–2	3–4	4–4	5–2	11–7	9–9	2–4	3–3	5–10
Milwaukee	5–2	6–3	7–9	8–10	3–4	1–5	8–7	2–4	–	2–4	1–5	14–1	4–3	6–0	10–5	6–2	7–8
New York	3–3	7–11	2–4	4–3	6–3	10–8	2–5	4–3	4–2	–	11–7	4–3	2–5	5–1	4–3	12–6	9–6
Philadelphia	4–3	14–4	4–3	5–3	5–0	8–10	4–3	4–4	5–1	7–11	–	4–2	4–2	3–3	5–4	12–6	4–11
Pittsburgh	3–4	5–2	4–14	9–6	2–5	2–3	8–8	2–5	1–14	3–4	2–4	–	3–4	4–2	10–7	3–4	6–9
San Diego	8–10	1–5	2–5	3–4	9–9	2–4	3–3	7–11	3–4	5–2	2–4	4–3	–	5–13	1–6	5–1	3–15
San Francisco	7–11	5–2	3–4	1–5	7–11	3–3	1–7	9–9	0–6	1–5	3–3	2–4	13–5	–	4–3	7–0	6–12
St. Louis	4–3	5–2	6–9	10–5	4–3	5–2	8–7	4–2	5–10	3–4	4–5	7–10	6–1	3–4	–	5–1	7–8
Washington	2–4	12–6	3–3	3–4	3–4	3–14	2–4	3–3	2–6	6–12	6–12	4–3	1–5	0–7	1–5	–	8–10

== Game log ==
2008 Game Log
March

#	Date	Opponent	Score	Win	Loss	Save	Attendance	Record
--	March 31	Rockies	Postponed (rain) Rescheduled for April 1					

April (18-11)

#	Date	Opponent	Score	Win	Loss	Save	Attendance	Record
1	April 1	Rockies	2 – 1	Buchholz (1-0)	Franklin (0-1)	Corpas (1)	45,996	0-1
2	April 2	Rockies	8 – 3	Wellemeyer (1-0)	Cook (0-1)		39,915	1-1
3	April 3	Rockies	3 – 0	Thompson (1-0)	Jiménez (0-1)	Isringhausen (1)	33,748	2-1
4	April 4	Nationals	5 – 4	Looper (1-0)	Pérez (0-1)	Isringhausen (2)	37,191	3-1
5	April 5	Nationals	5 – 4	Wainwright (1-0)	Chico (0-1)	Flores (1)	41,463	4-1
6	April 6	Nationals	3 – 0	Lohse (1-0)	Lannan (0-1)	Isringhausen (3)	41,912	5-1
7	April 7	@ Astros	5 – 3	Valverde (2-0)	McClellan (0-1)		43,483	5-2
8	April 8	@ Astros	5 – 3	Reyes (1-0)	Geary (0-1)	Isringhausen (4)	30,184	6-2
9	April 9	@ Astros	6 – 4	Looper (2-0)	Sampson (0-1)	Isringhausen (5)	29,187	7-2
10	April 10	@ Giants	5 – 1	Correia (1-1)	Wainwright (1-1)	Wilson (2)	30,333	7-3
11	April 11	@ Giants	8 – 2	Lohse (2-0)	Zito (0-3)		33,954	8-3
12	April 12	@ Giants	8 – 7 (10)	Isringhausen (1-0)	Threets (0-1	Reyes (1)	35,717	9-3
13	April 13	@ Giants	7 – 4	Lincecum (2-0)	Piñeiro (0-1)	Wilson (3)	37,195	9-4
14	April 15	Brewers	6 – 1	Looper (3-0)	Bush (0-3)		39,438	10-4
15	April 16	Brewers	5 – 4	Wainwright (2-1)	Villanueva (1-2)	Isringhausen (6)	40,712	11-4
16	April 17	Brewers	5 – 3 (10)	Shouse (1-0)	Thompson (1-1)	Gagné (4)	36,850	11-5
17	April 18	Giants	11 – 1	Wellemeyer (2-0)	Cain (0-2)		40,684	12-5
18	April 19	Giants	3 – 0	Lincecum (3-0)	Piñeiro (0-2)	Wilson (5)	41,707	12-6
19	April 20	Giants	8 – 2	Sánchez (1-1)	Looper (3-1)		41,127	12-7
20	April 21	@ Brewers	4 – 3	Franklin (1-1)	Turnbow (0-1)	Isringhausen (7)	31,240	13-7
21	April 22	@ Brewers	9 – 8 (12)	McClung (1-0)	Isringhausen (1-1)		23,478	13-8
22	April 23	@ Pirates	7 – 4	Marte (1-0)	Reyes (1-1)	Capps (6)	10,487	13-9
23	April 24	@ Pirates	6 – 2	Piñeiro (1-2)	Gorzelanny (1-3)	Isringhausen (8)	9,544	14-9
24	April 25	Astros	3 – 2	Wright (3-0)	Isringhausen (1-2)	Valverde (4)	41,193	14-10
25	April 26	Astros	4 – 3	Wainwright (3-1)	Borkowski (0-1)		43,040	15-10
26	April 27	Astros	5 – 1	Lohse (3-0)	Backe (1-3)	McClellan (1)	44,222	16-10
27	April 28	Reds	4 – 3	Arroyo (1-3)	Wellemeyer (2-1)	Cordero (4)	37,229	16-11
28	April 29	Reds	7 – 2	Piñeiro (2-2)	Cueto (1-3)		35,356	17-11
29	April 30	Reds	5 – 2	Looper (4-1)	Harang (1-4)	Isringhausen (9)	40,629	18-11

May (15-13)

#	Date	Opponent	Score	Win	Loss	Save	Attendance	Record
30	May 2	Cubs	5 – 3 (11)	Villone (1-0)	Fox (0-1)		45,077	19-11
31	May 3	Cubs (FOX)	9 – 3	Lilly (2-4)	Lohse (3-1)		46,792	19-12
32	May 4	Cubs (ESPN)	5 – 3	Wellemeyer (3-1)	Marquis (1-2)	Isringhausen (10)	44,969	20-12
33	May 5	@ Rockies	6 – 5	Flores (1-0)	Fuentes (0-2)	Isringhausen (11)	28,183	21-12
34	May 6	@ Rockies	6 – 5	Looper (5-1)	Redman (2-3)	Franklin (1)	25,460	22-12
35	May 7	@ Rockies	4 – 3	Speier (1-1)	Isringhausen (1-3)	Fuentes (3)	25.432	22-13
36	May 8	@ Rockies	9 – 3	de la Rosa (1-1)	Lohse (3-2)		25,376	22-14
37	May 9	@ Brewers	4 – 3	Shouse (3-0)	Isringhausen (1-4)		42,705	22-15
38	May 10	@ Brewers	5 – 3	Springer (1-0)	Gagné (1-2)	Franklin (2)	43,382	23-15
39	May 11	@ Brewers	5 – 3	Suppan (2-2)	Looper (5-2)	Shouse (1)	41,197	23-16
40	May 12	@ Brewers	8 – 3	Bush (1-4)	Wainwright (3-2)	Mota (1)	25,757	23-17
41	May 13	Pirates	8 – 4 (10)	Salas (1-0)	Villone (1-1)		38,800	23-18
42	May 14	Pirates	5 – 1	Wellemeyer (4-1)	Maholm (2-4)		38,720	24-18
43	May 15	Pirates	11-5	Grabow (3-1)	Isringhausen (1-5)		41,244	24-19
44	May 16	Rays	3 – 1	Sonnanstine (6-1)	Looper (5-3)	Percival (11)	43,136	24-20
45	May 17	Rays	9 – 8 (10)	Franklin (2-1)	Wheeler (0-3)		43,907	25-20
46	May 18	Rays	5 – 4	Perez (1-0)	Glover (0-2)		46,392	26-20
47	May 19	@ Padres	8 – 2	Wellemeyer (5-1)	Ledezma (0-1)		22,638	27-20
48	May 20	@ Padres	3 – 2	Corey (1-0)	Piñeiro (2-3)	Hoffman (9)	27,181	27-21
49	May 21	@ Padres	11 – 3	Looper (6-3)	Young (4-4)		21,011	28-21
50	May 23	@ Dodgers	2 – 1	Wainwright (4-2)	Lowe (2-5)	Franklin (3)	52,281	29-21
51	May 24	@ Dodgers	4 – 0	Lohse (4-2)	Penny (5-5)		44,785	30-21
52	May 25	@ Dodgers	4 – 3 (10)	Saito (3-1)	Parisi (0-1)		46,566	30-22
53	May 27	Astros	8 – 2	Chacón (2-0)	Looper (6-4)		41,104	30-23
54	May 28	Astros	6 – 1	Wainwright (5-2)	Rodríguez (1-1)		41,115	31-23
55	May 29	Astros	3 – 2	Lohse (5-2)	Oswalt (4-5)	Franklin (4)	41,786	32-23
56	May 30	Pirates	5 – 4	Wellemeyer (6-1)	Duke (2-4)	Franklin (5)	42,791	33-23
57	May 31	Pirates	14 – 4	Maholm (3-5)	Parisi (0-2)		44,302	33-24

June (15-12)

#	Date	Opponent	Score	Win	Loss	Save	Attendance	Record
58	June 1	Pirates	7 – 4	Looper (7-4)	Snell (2-5)	Franklin (6)	43,462	34-24
59	June 2	Pirates	5 – 4	Osoria (3-1)	Wainwright (5-3)	Capps (11)	42,129	34-25
60	June 3	@ Nationals	6 – 1	Lohse (6-2)	Pérez (2-5)		26,875	35-25
--	June 4	@ Nationals	Postponed (rain) Rescheduled for June 5					
61	June 5	@ Nationals	4 – 1	Wellemeyer (7-1)	Lannan (4-6)	Franklin (7)	27,264	36-25
62	June 5	@ Nationals	10 – 9 (10)	Sanches (2-0)	Franklin (2-2)		32,357	36-26
63	June 6	@ Astros	6 – 1	Moehler (3-2)	Looper (7-5)		38,596	36-27
64	June 7	@ Astros	8 – 4	Wainwright (6-3)	Chacón (2-2)		39,811	37-27
65	June 8	@ Astros	5 – 4	Lohse (7-2)	Rodríguez (2-2)	Franklin (8)	39,923	38-27
66	June 10	@ Reds	7 – 2	Boggs (1-0)	Bailey (0-2)		34,234	39-27
67	June 11	@ Reds	10 – 0	Looper (8-5)	Cueto (5-6)		19,851	40-27
68	June 12	@ Reds	6 – 2	Burton (3-1)	Worrell (0-1)		22,121	40-28
69	June 13	Phillies	20 – 2	Kendrick (6-2)	Wellemeyer (7-2)		44,376	40-29
70	June 14	Phillies (FOX)	3 – 2	Lohse (8-2)	Eaton (2-4)	Franklin (9)	45,089	41-29
71	June 15	Phillies	7 – 6 (10)	Reyes (2-1)	Gordon (5-4)		45,391	42-29
72	June 17	Royals	2 – 1	Davies (3-0)	Villone (1-2)	Soria (16)	44,050 *	42-30
73	June 18	Royals	3 – 2	Bannister (6-6)	McClellan (0-2)	Soria (17)	43,810	42-31
74	June 19	Royals	4 – 1	Greinke (6-4)	Thompson (1-2)	Soria (18)	44,277	42-32
75	June 20	@ Red Sox	5 – 4	Lohse (9-2)	Wakefield (4-5)	Franklin (10)	37,671	43-32
76	June 21	@ Red Sox (FOX)	9 – 3	Boggs (2-0)	Matsuzaka (8-1)		37,227	44-32
77	June 22	@ Red Sox	5 – 3 (13)	Lopez (2-0)	Parisi (0-3)		37,085	44-33
78	June 24	@ Tigers	8 – 4	Looper (9-5)	Rogers (5-5)		44,446	45-33
79	June 25	@ Tigers	8 – 7	Jones (3-0)	McClellan (0-3)		40,091	45-34
80	June 26	@ Tigers	3 – 2 (10)	Seay (1-1)	Parisi (0-4)		41,022	45-35
81	June 27	@ Royals	7 – 2	Meche (6-8)	Piñeiro (2-4)		36,360	45-36
82	June 28	@ Royals	5 – 1	Boggs (3-0)	Davies (3-1)		37,537	46-36
83	June 29	@ Royals	9 – 6	Perez (2-0)	Bannister (7-7)	Franklin (11)	31,803	47-36
84	June 30	Mets (ESPN)	7 – 1	Lohse (10-2)	Maine (8-6)		42,206	48-36

July (13-14)

#	Date	Opponent	Score	Win	Loss	Save	Attendance	Record
85	July 1	Mets	7 – 4	Armas (1-0)	Wellemeyer (7-3)	Wagner (19)	42,425	48-37
86	July 2	Mets	8 – 7	Franklin (3-2)	Muñiz (0-1)		40,995	49-37
87	July 3	Mets	11 – 1	Pelfrey (6-6)	Boggs (3-1)		43,099	49-38
88	July 4	Cubs	2 – 1	Zambrano (9-3)	Looper (9-6)	Wood (22)	46,450	49-39
89	July 5	Cubs (FOX)	5 – 4	McClellan (1-3)	Wood (4-2)		46,865 **	50-39
90	July 6	Cubs (TBS)	7 – 1	Marshall (1-2)	Wellemeyer (7-4)		46,752	50-40
91	July 8	@ Phillies	2 – 0	Piñeiro (3-4)	Hamels (9-6)	Franklin (12)	41,519	51-40
92	July 9	@ Phillies	4 – 2	Condrey (2-1)	McClellan (1-4)	Lidge (20)	44,951	51-41
93	July 10	@ Phillies	4 – 1	Moyer (8-6)	Looper (9-7)	Romero (1)	44,241	51-42
94	July 11	@ Pirates	6 – 0	Lohse (11-2)	Duke (4-6)		37,113	52-42
95	July 12	@ Pirates	12 – 11 (10)	Bautista (3-2)	Perez (2-1)		29,387	52-43
96	July 13	@ Pirates	11 – 6	Springer (2-0)	Osoria (3-3)		21,052	53-43
--	July 15	All-Star Game	American League 4, National League 3 (15)					
97	July 17	Padres	4 – 3	Lohse (12-2)	Peavy (7-6)	Franklin (13)	42,148	54-43
98	July 18	Padres	11 – 7	McClellan (2-4)	Bell (6-4)		44,398	55-43
99	July 19	Padres (FOX)	6 – 5	Wellemeyer (8-4)	Wolf (6-10)	Franklin (14)	45,399	56-43
100	July 20	Padres	9 – 5	Thompson (2-2)	Corey (1-2)		44,214	57-43
101	July 21	Brewers (ESPN)	6 – 3 (10)	Torres (5-2)	Franklin (3-3)		41,006	57-44
102	July 22	Brewers	4 – 3	Shouse (4-1)	McClellan (2-5)	Torres (18)	41,955	57-45
103	July 23	Brewers	3 – 0	Sabathia (10-8)	Looper (9-8)		41,513	57-46
104	July 24	Brewers	4 – 3	Gagné (3-2)	Franklin (3-4)	Torres (19)	41,233	57-47
105	July 25	@ Mets	7 – 2	Pelfrey (9-6)	Boggs (3-2)		55,372	57-48
106	July 26	@ Mets	10 – 8 (14)	Thompson (3-2)	Heilman (1-4)		53,799	58-48
107	July 27	@ Mets	9 – 1	Santana (9-7)	Lohse (12-3)		53,691	58-49
108	July 28	@ Braves	12 – 3	Looper (10-8)	Morton (2-4)		28,705	59-49
109	July 29	@ Braves	8 – 3	Franklin (4-4)	Soriano (0-1)		29,541	60-49
110	July 30	@ Braves	7 – 2	Thompson (4-2)	Jurrjens (10-6)		35,257	61-49
111	July 31	@ Braves	9 – 4	Bennett (2-4)	Piñeiro (3-5)		40,653	61-50

August (13-13)

#	Date	Opponent	Score	Win	Loss	Save	Attendance	Record
112	August 1	Phillies	6 – 3	Lohse (13-3)	Hamels (9-7)	Isringhausen (12)	44,234	62-50
113	August 2	Phillies	2 – 1	Blanton (6-12)	Looper (10-9)	Lidge (27)	45,450	62-51
114	August 3	Phillies (ESPN)	5 – 4	Durbin (4-2)	García (0-1)	Lidge (28)	44,655	62-52
115	August 5	Dodgers	6 – 4 (11)	García (1-1)	Johnson (1-1)		40,773	63-52
116	August 6	Dodgers	9 – 6	Piñeiro (4-5)	Lowe (8-10)	Perez (1)	42,581	64-52
117	August 7	Dodgers	4 – 1	Kershaw (2-3)	Lohse (13-4)	Broxton (6)	40,500	64-53
118	August 8	@ Cubs	3 – 2 (11)	Howry (5-4)	Franklin (4-5)		41,539	64-54
119	August 9	@ Cubs (FOX)	12 – 3	Wellemeyer (9-4)	Zambrano (12-5)		41,436	65-54
120	August 10	@ Cubs (ESPN)	6 – 2	Dempster (13-5)	Carpenter (0-1)		41,268	65-55
121	August 11	@ Marlins	4 – 2	Piñeiro (5-5)	Sánchez (1-2)	Perez (2)	13,419	66-55
122	August 12	@ Marlins	4 – 3	Volstad (4-2)	Lohse (13-5)	Gregg (26)	14,211	66-56
123	August 13	@ Marlins	6 – 4	Looper (11-9)	Pinto (2-4)	Perez (3)	15,233	67-56
124	August 14	@ Marlins	3 – 0	Wellemeyer (10-4)	Olsen (6-8)		15,609	68-56
125	August 15	@ Reds	5 – 3	Thompson (5-2)	Arroyo (10-10)	Perez (4)	26,234	69-56
126	August 16	@ Reds	9 – 3	Piñeiro (6-5)	Harang (3-13)		30,713	70-56
127	August 17	@ Reds	7 – 3	Vólquez (15-5)	Lohse (13-6)		37,468	70-57
128	August 19	Pirates	4 – 1	Snell (5-10)	Looper (11-10)	Beam (1)	39,502	70-58
129	August 20	Pirates	11 – 2	Wellemeyer (11-4)	Davis (1-3)		37,269	71-58
130	August 22	Braves	18 – 3	Wainwright (7-3)	Morton (3-8)	Piñeiro (1)	43,926	72-58
131	August 23	Braves (FOX)	8 – 4	Carlyle (1-0)	McClellan (2-6)	Gonzalez (6)	44,074	72-59
132	August 24	Braves	6 – 3	Looper (12-10)	Reyes (3-10)	Perez (5)	43,361	73-59
133	August 26	Brewers	12 – 0	Sheets (12-7)	Wellemeyer (11-5)		41,121	73-60
134	August 27	Brewers	5 – 3	Franklin (5-5)	Riske (1-2)	Perez (6)	41,433	74-60
135	August 29	@ Astros	3 – 2	Brocail (6-5)	Springer (2-1)		33,347	74-61
136	August 30	@ Astros	8 – 5	Moehler (10-5)	Looper (12-11)	Valverde (36)	37,569	74-62
137	August 31	@ Astros	3 – 0	Rodríguez (8-6)	Wellemeyer (11-6)	Valverde (37)	35,638	74-63

September (12-13)

#	Date	Opponent	Score	Win	Loss	Save	Attendance	Record
138	September 1	@ D-backs	8 – 6	Qualls (3-8)	McClellan (2-7)	Lyon (26)	35,075	74-64
139	September 2	@ D-backs	8 – 2	Wainwright (8-3)	Petit (3-4)		27,568	75-64
140	September 3	@ D-backs	4 – 3	Qualls (4-8)	Perez (2-2)		24,350	75-65
141	September 5	Marlins	4 – 1 (11)	Rhodes (2-0)	Franklin (5-6)	Lindstrom (1)	42,633	75-66
142	September 6	Marlins	5 – 3	Wellemeyer (12-6)	Olsen (6-10)	Franklin (15)	42,814	76-66
143	September 7	Marlins	3 – 1	Wainwright (9-3)	Johnson (4-1)	Perez (7)	46,045	77-66
144	September 9	Cubs	4 – 3	Perez (3-2)	Mármol (2-4)		43,806	78-66
145	September 10	Cubs	4 – 3	Lilly (14-9)	Looper (12-12)	Wood (29)	43,955	78-67
146	September 11	Cubs	3 – 2	Harden (5-1)	Wellemeyer (12-7)	Wood (30)	44,155	78-68
147	September 12	@ Pirates	10 – 2	Maholm (9-8)	Piñeiro (6-6)		14,903	78-69
148	September 13	@ Pirates	7 – 6 (12)	Hansen (1-3)	Perez (3-3)		17,132	78-70
149	September 14	@ Pirates	7 – 2	Beam (2-1)	Thompson (5-3)		18,994	78-71
150	September 16	@ Reds	7 – 2	Arroyo (15-10)	Looper (12-13)		19,708	78-72
151	September 17	@ Reds	3 – 0	Harang (5-16)	Wellemeyer (12-8)		14,850	78-73
152	September 18	@ Reds	5 – 4	Lohse (14-6)	Vólquez (16-6)	Motte (1)	14,041	79-73
153	September 19	@ Cubs	12 – 6	Wainwright (10-3)	Zambrano (14-6)		40,972	80-73
154	September 20	@ Cubs	5 – 4	Lilly (16-9)	Piñeiro (6-7)	Wood (32)	41,597	80-74
155	September 21	@ Cubs	5 – 1	Dempster (17-6)	Looper (12-14)		40,551	80-75
156	September 22	D-backs	4 – 2	Webb (22-7)	Wellemeyer (12-9)	Qualls (7)	40,349	80-76
157	September 23	D-backs	7 – 4	Lohse (15-6)	Johnson (10-10)	Franklin (16)	40,013	81-76
158	September 24	D-backs	4 – 2	Wainwright (11-3)	Scherzer (0-4)	Franklin (17)	40,029	82-76
159	September 25	D-backs	12 – 3	Piñeiro (7-7)	Rosales (1-1)		40,502	83-76
160	September 26	Reds	7 – 6	Franklin (6-6)	Bray (2-2)		44,709	84-76
161	September 27	Reds	8 – 5	Wellemeyer (13-9)	Harang (6-17)		43,682	85-76
162	September 28	Reds	11 – 4	Thompson (6-3)	Pettyjohn (0-1)		43,300	86-76

* June 17, originally 43,793 reported.
** July 5, largest ever at Busch Stadium.

== Players ==
=== Roster ===
2008 St. Louis Cardinals
Roster
Pitchers: 68 Mitchell Boggs; 29 Chris Carpenter; 34 Randy Flores; 31 Ryan Franklin; 64 Jaime García; 44 Jason Isringhausen; 56 Kelvin Jiménez; 52 Josh Kinney; 26 Kyle Lohse; 41 Braden Looper; 46 Kyle McClellan; 60 Jason Motte; 30 Mark Mulder; 65 Mike Parisi; 63 Chris Perez; 35 Joel Piñeiro; 23 Anthony Reyes; 36 Russ Springer; 48 Brad Thompson; 27 Ron Villone; 50 Adam Wainwright; 37 Todd Wellemeyer; 67 Mark Worrell	Catchers: 53 Mark Johnson; 21 Jason LaRue; 4 Yadier Molina; Infielders: 23 Brian Barden; 8 Troy Glaus; 3 César Izturis; 7 Adam Kennedy; 22 Felipe López; 12 Aaron Miles; 33 Josh Phelps; 5 Albert Pujols; 13 Brendan Ryan; 59 Rico Washington	Outfielders: 24 Rick Ankiel; 54 Brian Barton; 16 Chris Duncan; 47 Ryan Ludwick; 62 Joe Mather; 55 Skip Schumaker; 61 Nick Stavinoha	Manager: 10 Tony La Russa; Coaches: 18 Dave Duncan (pitching); 38 Marty Mason (bullpen); 39 Dave McKay (first base); 16 Hal McRae (hitting); 11 José Oquendo (third base); 49 Joe Pettini (bench)

== Scoring by inning ==
INNING	1	2	3	4	5	6	7	8	9	10	11	12	13	14	TOTAL
CARDINALS	117	82	103	93	75	81	80	80	57	5	4	0	0	2	779
OPPONENTS	72	66	85	98	78	76	69	81	77	15	4	2	2	0	725

== Player stats ==
=== Batting ===
Note: G = Games played; AB = At bats; R = Runs; H = Hits; 2B= Doubles; HR = Home runs; RBI = Runs batted in; BB = Walks; SO = Strikeouts; Avg. = Batting average; OBP = On-base Percentage; SLG = Slugging percentage

Cardinals Hitting Statistics

Sortable TEAM hitting stats

Player	G	AB	R	H	2B	HR	RBI	BB	SO	Avg.	OBP	SLG
Albert Pujols (MVP)	148	524 (49)	100 (14)	187 (3)	44 (4)	37 (4)	116 (4)	104 (2)	54	.357 (2)	.462 (2)	.653 (1)
Ryan Ludwick	152	538 (43)	104 (10)	161 (30)	40 (13)	37 (4)	113 (6)	62 (31)	146 (7)	.299 (15)	.375 (17)	.591 (2)
Troy Glaus	151	544 (38)	69	147 (47)	33 (34)	27 (20)	99 (15)	87 (10)	104 (40)	.270	.372 (20)	.483 (30)
Rick Ankiel [9/10]	120	413	65	109	21	25 (25)	71 (46)	42	100 (49)	.264	.337 (50)	.506 (21)
Skip Schumaker	153	540 (39)	87 (26)	163 (25)	22	8	46	47	60	.302 (10)	.359 (31)	.406
Felipe López	143	481	84	136	28	6	46	43	82	.283	.343	.387
Yadier Molina	124	444	37	135	18	7	56	32	29	.304 * (10)	.349 (38)	.392
César Izturis	135	414	50	109	10	1	24	29	26	.263	.319	.309
Aaron Miles	134	379	49	120	15	4	31	23	37	.317	.355	.398
Adam Kennedy	115	339	42	95	17	2	36	21	43	.280	.321	.372
Chris Duncan	76	222	26	55	8	6	27	34	52	.248	.321	.372
Brendan Ryan	80	197	30	48	9	0	10	18	31	.244	.307	.289
Jason LaRue	61	164	17	35	8	4	21	15	20	.213	.296	.348
Brian Barton	82	153	23	41	9	2	13	19	39	.268	.354	.392
Joe Mather	54	133	20	32	7	8	18	12	32	.241	.306	.474
Nick Stavinoha	29	57	4	11	1	0	4	2	11	.193	.217	.211
Josh Phelps	19	34	4	9	1	0	1	2	11	.265	.306	.294
Rico Washington	14	19	2	3	2	0	3	3	6	.158	.273	.263
Mark Johnson	10	17	1	5	0	0	2	1	2	.294	.333	.294
Brian Barden	9	9	0	2	0	0	1	0	4	.222	.222	.222
Kyle Lohse (P)	31	63	1	7	1	0	5	0	20	.111	.111	.127
Braden Looper (P)	40	63	5	16	3	0	4	4	21	.254	.299	.333
Adam Wainwright (P)	25	60	5	16	2	1	6	2	20	.267	.286	.350
Todd Wellemeyer (P)	32	58	2	9	0	0	5	1	29	.155	.167	.155
Joel Piñeiro (P)	30	51	3	5	3	0	4	3	35	.098	.148	.157
Brad Thompson (P)	26	12	2	3	0	0	2	2	6	.250	.357	.250
(Other Pitchers)	--	33	1	2	1	1	5	3	19	.061	.132	.182
TOTAL	162	5,636 (1)	779 (4)	1,585 (1)	283 (11)	174 (6)	744 (4)	577 (6)	985 (16)	.281 (1)	.350 (2)	.433 (3)

* not eligible for batting average title (NL ranking)

=== Starting pitchers ===
Note: GS = Games started; IP = Innings pitched; W = Wins; L = Loss; ERA = Earned run average; WHIP = (Walks + Hits) per inning pitched; HBP = Hit by pitch; BF = Batters faced; O-AVG = Opponent Batting Ave.; O-SLG = Opponent Slugging Ave.; R support avg = Average Runs support from his team per Games Started

Cardinals Pitching Statistics

Sortable TEAM pitching stats

Player	GS	IP	W	L	ERA	H	HR	BB	SO	WHIP	HBP	BF	O-AVG	O-SLG	R support avg
Chris Carpenter (n/a)	3	14.1	0	1	1.88	14	0	4	6	1.26	0	58	.275	.314	5.0
Adam Wainwright	20	132.0	11	3	3.20	122	12	34	91	1.18	3	544	.245	.394	5.8
Braden Looper	33	199.0	12	14	4.16	216	25	45	108	1.31	11	842	.278	.436	4.4
Brad Thompson	6	29.1	3	2	4.91	33	2	7	17	1.36	2	124	.297	.459	4.5
Todd Wellemeyer	32	192.2	13	9	3.71	178	24	60	133	1.24	7	807	.245	.415	4.8
Kyle Lohse	33	200.0	15	6	3.78	211	18	49	119	1.30	3	839	.272	.418	4.2
Mark Mulder *+	1	0.1	0	0	0.00	0	0	2	1	6.06	0	3	.000	.000	2.0
Joel Piñeiro	25	145.2	7	7	5.13	175	22	34	80	1.43	2	630	.299	.505	5.1
Mike Parisi *+	2	6.2	0	1	17.54	18	0	7	3	3.75	0	46	.500	.667	6.5
Mitchell Boggs +	6	26.2	3	2	7.55	37	4	21	13	1.87	2	151	.294	.492	5.2
Jaime García *+	1	5.0	0	0	5.40	5	2	1	4	1.20	0	20	.263	.579	9.0
TOTAL	162	955.0	64	45	4.20	1,009	109	264	575	1.33	30	4,064	.272	.437	4.8

* now, a reliever
+ not on 25-man active roster
† on 15-day or 60-day disabled list
(n/a) not available to pitch

=== Relief pitchers ===
Note: G = Games pitched; IP = Innings pitched; W = Wins; L = Losses; SV = Saves; HLD = Holds; H = Hits allowed; R = Runs allowed; ER = Earned run average; BB = Walks allowed; SO = Strikeouts; WHIP = (Walks + hits) per inning pitched; O-Avg = Opponent batting average

Player	G	IP	W	L	SV	HLD	H	R	ER	HR	ERA	BB	SO	WHIP	O-AVG
Jason Isringhausen *† (8/16)	42	42.2	1	5	12	2	48	28	27	5	5.70	22	36	1.64	.279
Ryan Franklin (9/28)	74	78.2	6	6	17	13	86	34	31	10	3.55	30	51	1.47	.277
Russ Springer (9/28)	70	50.1	2	1	0	17	39	14	13	4	2.32	18	45	1.13	.212
Randy Flores (9/14) *	43	25.2	1	0	1	16	34	16	15	2	5.26	20	17	2.10	.315
Anthony Reyes * (+ 7/26)	10	14.2	2	1	1	2	16	8	8	2	4.91	3	10	1.30	.276
Ron Villone (9/28)	74	50.0	1	2	1	16	45	27	26	4	4.68	37	50	1.64	.239
Kyle McClellan (9/21)	67	74.2	2	7	1	32	78	36	33	7	3.98	25	59	1.38	.268
Mike Parisi (6/26) *	10	16.1	0	3	0	0	19	8	8	2	4.41	8	10	1.65	.284
Chris Perez (9/27)	41	41.2	3	3	7	6	34	18	17	5	3.67	22	42	1.34	.227
Mark Worrell (6/13) *	4	5.2	0	1	0	0	8	5	5	1	5.67	4	4	2.12	.364
Jaime García (8/26) *	9	11.0	1	1	0	3	9	7	7	2	5.73	7	4	1.45	.220
Mark Mulder (7/2) *†	2	1.1	0	0	0	0	4	2	2	0	13.50	0	1	3.00	.571
Kelvin Jiménez (9/28)	15	24.0	0	0	0	1	28	15	15	5	5.63	15	11	1.79	.295
Joel Piñeiro (8/22)	1	3.0	0	0	1	0	5	2	2	0	6.00	1	1	2.00	.357
Brad Thompson (9/22)	20	35.1	3	1	1	1	39	21	21	3	5.35	12	15	1.44	.287
Chris Carpenter (9/2) n/a	1	1.0	0	0	0	0	2	0	0	0	0.00	0	1	2.00	.400
Josh Kinney (9/27)	7	7.0	0	0	0	1	3	0	0	0	0.00	1	8	0.57	.125
Jason Motte (9/28)	12	11.0	0	0	1	4	5	2	1	0	0.82	3	16	0.73	.139
TOTAL Relief	160	495.0	22	31	43	114	503	244	232	52	4.22	229	381	1.48	.263
TOTAL PITCHING	162	1,454.0 (12)	86 (5)	76	42 (6)	106 (1)	1,517 (4)	725 (10)	677 (10)	163 (7)	4.19 (7)	496 (13)	957 (16)	1.38 (8)	.270 (13)

TOTAL PITCHING: O-OBP .332 (9), O-SLG .431 (12)

Pitchers: Last date pitched in ( )
TOTAL PITCHING: (NL rank)

TOTAL Relief (through 9/27) St. Louis Cardinals GAME NOTES

Sv/SvOpp: 43/73 (59%)
1st batter/retired: 491/331 (67%)
Inherited runners/scored: 228/67 (29%)

* not on 25-man active roster
† on 15-day disabled list
+ traded away

== Cardinals Record When ==
Home 46-35
Away 40-41

Scoring more than 3 runs 78-18
Scoring 3 runs 6-18
Scoring fewer than 3 runs 2-40

Leading after 7 innings 73-14
Tied after 7 innings 8- 11
Trailing after 7 innings 5-51

Leading after 8 innings 75-6
Tied after 8 innings 10- 9
Trailing after 8 innings 1-61

Blown Saves by bullpen: 31 (1st in NL)
Games lost by bullpen: 31 (2nd in NL to San Diego Padres)

Extra innings 6-12
Shutouts 7-5

One-run games 24-28

Out-hit opponents 60-18
Same hits as opponents 9-9
Out-hit by opponents 17-49

Runs via HR 279
Opp. Runs via HR 247

By Day

Mon. 6- 7
Tue. 13-12
Wed. 15- 9
Thu. 8-14
Fri. 14-12
Sat. 17- 9
Sun. 13-13

By Opponent

HOME ROAD TOTAL

Division

NL Central 20-19 16-22 36-41
NL East 12-7 10-7 22-14
NL West 12-5 9-8 21-13
AL East 2-1 2-1 4-2
AL Central 0-3 3-3 3-6

TOTALS 46-35 40-41 86-76
(Interleague 7-8)

== Busch Stadium (Indexes) ==
2008 (100 = Neutral Park, > 100 Ballpark favors, < 100 Ballpark inhibits
81 G; Cardinals: 2,731 AB; Opponents: 2,847 AB)

BA 98 R 94 H 96 2B 88 3B 102 HR 93 BB 99 SO 97 E 94 E-inf. 93 LHB-BA 97 LHB-HR 105 RHB-BA 98 RHB-HR 87

2006–2008 Index (3-yr. composite)

242 G; Cardinals: 8,143 AB; Opponents: 8,506 AB)

BA 99 R 94 H 99 2B 91 3B 92 HR 84 BB 99 SO 94 E 108 E-inf. 106 LHB-BA 98 LHB-HR 86 RHB-BA 99 RHB-HR 83

== Draft picks ==
St. Louis' picks at the 2008 Major League Baseball draft in Lake Buena Vista, Florida on June 5, 2008.

Round	#	Player	Position	Class, Bats/Throws, Ht/Wt., birthdate (birthplace)	College
1	13	Brett Wallace	3B / 1B	Junior, L/R, 6' 2" / 235 lbs., Aug 26, 1986 (Sonoma, California)	Arizona State University
Comp A	39	Lance Lynn	SP	Junior, R/R, 6' 5" / 250 lbs., May 12, 1987 (Brownsburg, Indiana)	University of Mississippi
2	59	Shane Peterson	OF / 1B	Junior, L/L, 6' 0" / 195 lbs., Feb 11, 1988 (Temecula, California)	Cal State Longbeach
3	91	Ernest Vasquez	SS	High School, R/R, 5' 11" / 175 lbs., Feb 26, 1989 (Las Vegas, Nevada)	Durango High School (Nevada)
4	125	Scott Gorgen	SP	Junior, R/R, 5' 10" / 190 lbs., Jan 27, 1987 (Concord, California)	University of California, Irvine
5	155	Jermaine Curtis	3B	Junior, R/R, 5' 11" / 190 lbs., Jul 10, 1987 (Fontana, California)	UCLA
6	185	Eric Fornataro	SP	High School, R/R, 6' 1" / 195 lbs., Jan 2, 1988 (Richmond, Virginia)	Miami Dade College (South)
7	215	Anthony Ferrara	SP	High School, R/L, 6' 1" / 175 lbs., Sep 9, 1989 (Riverview, Florida)	Riverview HS (FL)
8	245	Ryan Kulik	SP	Senior, L/L, 5' 11" / 205 lbs., Dec 3, 1985	Rowan University
9	275	Aaron Luna	LF	Junior, R/R, 5' 11" / 200 lbs., Mar 28, 1987	Rice University
10	305	Alejandro Castellanos	2B	Sophomore, R/R, 5' 11" / 180 lbs., Aug 4, 1986	Belmont Abbey College
11	335	Devin Shepherd	RF	Junior, R/R, 6' 3" / 180 lbs., Sep 9, 1987	College of Southern Nevada
12	365	Michael Swinson	CF	High School, L/R, 6' 2" / 185 lbs., Sep 24, 1989	Coffee HS (GA)
13	395	Mitchell Harris	RHP	Senior, R/R, 6' 4" / 215 lbs., Nov 7, 1985	United States Naval Academy
14	425	Charles Cutler	C	Junior, L/R, 6' 0" / 200 lbs., Jul 29, 1986	California
15	455	Scott McGregor	RHP	Junior, R/R, 6' 2" / 193 lbs., Dec 19, 1986	Memphis
16	485	Miguel Flores	RHP	Junior, R/R, 6' 0" / ? lbs., Jan 2, 1988	Cerritos College

== Farm system ==
Level	Team	League	Manager
AAA	Memphis Redbirds	Pacific Coast League	Chris Maloney
AA	Springfield Cardinals	Texas League	Ron Warner
A	Palm Beach Cardinals	Florida State League	Gaylen Pitts
A	Quad Cities River Bandits	Midwest League	Steve Dillard
A-Short Season	Batavia Muckdogs	New York–Penn League	Mark DeJohn
Rookie	Johnson City Cardinals	Appalachian League	Joe Almaraz
Rookie	GCL Cardinals	Gulf Coast League	Enrique Brito

LEAGUE CHAMPIONS: Batavia
