= 2008 Milwaukee Brewers season =

2008 Milwaukee Brewers
- National League Wild Card winners
- League: National League
- Division: Central
- Ballpark: Miller Park
- City: Milwaukee
- Record: 90–72 (.556)
- Divisional place: 2nd
- Owners: Mark Attanasio
- General managers: Doug Melvin
- Managers: Ned Yost; Dale Sveum
- Television: WMLW-CA; FSN Wisconsin (Brian Anderson, Bill Schroeder)
- Radio: 620 WTMJ (Bob Uecker, Jim Powell)
- Stats: ESPN.com; Baseball Reference

The 2008 Milwaukee Brewers season was the 39th season for the Brewers in Milwaukee, their 11th in the National League, and their 40th overall.

The season opened with optimism as the team attempted to build on the success of the 2007 season – their first winning season since 1992.

With 12 games remaining in the regular season, manager Ned Yost was fired and replaced with bench coach Dale Sveum. Under Sveum, the team completed the regular season 7–5, finishing second place in the National League Central with a record of 90–72 and winning the NL Wild Card. With the Wild Card berth, the team clinched its first playoff berth in 26 years. The season was highlighted by the midseason trade for ace pitcher CC Sabathia, who posted a 1.65 ERA in 130.2 innings pitched and won all but two starts.

In the NLDS, the Brewers were defeated 3–1 by the Philadelphia Phillies, who went on to win the World Series.

== Regular season ==
The Brewers played 20 extra inning games, the most of any MLB team in 2008.

=== Season standings ===
NL Central
Team	W	L	Pct.	GB	Home	Road
Chicago Cubs	97	64	.602	—	55‍–‍26	42‍–‍38
Milwaukee Brewers	90	72	.556	7½	49‍–‍32	41‍–‍40
Houston Astros	86	75	.534	11	47‍–‍33	39‍–‍42
St. Louis Cardinals	86	76	.531	11½	46‍–‍35	40‍–‍41
Cincinnati Reds	74	88	.457	23½	43‍–‍38	31‍–‍50
Pittsburgh Pirates	67	95	.414	30½	39‍–‍42	28‍–‍53

=== Record vs. opponents ===
2008 National League record Source: MLB Standings Grid – 2008
Team	AZ	ATL	CHC	CIN	COL	FLA	HOU	LAD	MIL	NYM	PHI	PIT	SD	SF	STL	WAS	AL
Arizona	–	3–5	2–4	2–4	15–3	2–7	4–2	8–10	2–5	3–3	3–4	4–3	10–8	11–7	3–4	4–2	6–9
Atlanta	5–3	–	0–6	3–3	4–3	10–8	3–3	4–2	3–6	11–7	4–14	2–5	5–1	2–5	2–5	6–12	8–7
Chicago	4–2	6–0	–	8–7	5–1	4–3	8–9	5–2	9–7	4–2	3–4	14–4	5–2	4–3	9–6	3–3	6–9
Cincinnati	4–2	3–3	7–8	–	1–5	6–2	3–12	1–7	10–8	3–4	3–5	6–9	4–3	5–1	5–10	4–3	9–6
Colorado	3–15	3–4	1–5	5–1	–	5–3	3–3	8–10	4–3	3–6	0–5	5–2	9–9	11–7	3–4	4–3	7–8
Florida	7–2	8–10	3–4	2–6	3–5	–	4–2	3–4	5–1	8–10	10–8	3–2	4–2	3–3	2–5	14–3	5–10
Houston	2–4	3–3	9–8	12–3	3–3	2–4	–	4–3	7–8	5–2	3–4	8–8	3–3	7–1	7–8	4–2	7–11
Los Angeles	10–8	2–4	2–5	7–1	10–8	4–3	3–4	–	4–2	3–4	4–4	5–2	11–7	9–9	2–4	3–3	5–10
Milwaukee	5–2	6–3	7–9	8–10	3–4	1–5	8–7	2–4	–	2–4	1–5	14–1	4–3	6–0	10–5	6–2	7–8
New York	3–3	7–11	2–4	4–3	6–3	10–8	2–5	4–3	4–2	–	11–7	4–3	2–5	5–1	4–3	12–6	9–6
Philadelphia	4–3	14–4	4–3	5–3	5–0	8–10	4–3	4–4	5–1	7–11	–	4–2	4–2	3–3	5–4	12–6	4–11
Pittsburgh	3–4	5–2	4–14	9–6	2–5	2–3	8–8	2–5	1–14	3–4	2–4	–	3–4	4–2	10–7	3–4	6–9
San Diego	8–10	1–5	2–5	3–4	9–9	2–4	3–3	7–11	3–4	5–2	2–4	4–3	–	5–13	1–6	5–1	3–15
San Francisco	7–11	5–2	3–4	1–5	7–11	3–3	1–7	9–9	0–6	1–5	3–3	2–4	13–5	–	4–3	7–0	6–12
St. Louis	4–3	5–2	6–9	10–5	4–3	5–2	8–7	4–2	5–10	3–4	4–5	7–10	6–1	3–4	–	5–1	7–8
Washington	2–4	12–6	3–3	3–4	3–4	3–14	2–4	3–3	2–6	6–12	6–12	4–3	1–5	0–7	1–5	–	8–10

=== Roster ===
2008 Milwaukee Brewers
Roster
Pitchers: 31 Dave Bush; 60 Todd Coffey; 45 Mark DiFelice; 48 Tim Dillard; 38 Éric Gagné; 49 Yovani Gallardo; 47 Zach Jackson; 73 Seth McClung; 58 Guillermo Mota; 43 Manny Parra; 54 David Riske; 52 CC Sabathia; 15 Ben Sheets; 51 Brian Shouse; 57 Mitch Stetter; 37 Jeff Suppan; 50 Julián Tavárez; 16 Salomón Torres; 59 Derrick Turnbow; 12 Carlos Villanueva	Catchers: 18 Jason Kendall; 11 Mike Rivera; Infielders: 14 Russell Branyan; 30 Craig Counsell; 27 Joe Dillon; 5 Ray Durham; 21 Alcides Escobar; 28 Prince Fielder; 24 Mat Gamel; 2 Bill Hall; 7 J. J. Hardy; 26 Hernán Iribarren; 47 Mike Lamb; 40 Brad Nelson; 23 Rickie Weeks	Outfielders: 8 Ryan Braun; 25 Mike Cameron; 14 Gabe Gross; 22 Tony Gwynn Jr.; 1 Corey Hart; 33 Gabe Kapler; 20 Laynce Nix; Other batters: 10 Vinny Rottino; 50 Ángel Salomé	Manager: 29 Dale Sveum; 3 Ned Yost; Coaches: 35 Bill Castro (Bullpen); 88 Garth Iorg (third base); 36 Mike Maddux (pitching); 6 Ed Sedar (first base); 9 Ted Simmons (Bench); 32 Jim Skaalen (hitting); 29 Dale Sveum (third base); 19 Robin Yount (Bench)

== Player stats ==
Note: Team leaders in batting and pitching are in bold.

=== Batting ===
==== Starters by position ====
Note: Pos = Position; G = Games played; AB = At bats; H = Hits; Avg. = Batting average; HR = Home runs; RBI = Runs batted in

Pos	Player	G	AB	H	Avg.	HR	RBI
C	Jason Kendall	151	516	127	.246	2	49
1B	Prince Fielder	**159**	588	162	.276	34	102
2B	Rickie Weeks	129	475	111	.234	14	46
SS	J.J. Hardy	146	569	161	.283	24	74
3B	Bill Hall	128	404	91	.225	15	55
LF	Ryan Braun	151	611	**174**	**.285**	**37**	**106**
CF	Mike Cameron	120	444	108	.243	25	70
RF	Corey Hart	157	**612**	164	.268	20	91

==== Other batters ====
Note: G = Games played; AB = At bats; H = Hits; Avg. = Batting average; HR = Home runs; RBI = Runs batted in

Player	G	AB	H	Avg.	HR	RBI
Craig Counsell	110	248	56	.226	1	14
Gabe Kapler	96	229	69	.301	8	38
Russell Branyan	50	132	33	.250	12	20
Ray Durham	41	107	30	.280	3	13
Joe Dillon	56	75	16	.213	1	6
Mike Rivera	21	62	19	.306	1	14
Gabe Gross	16	43	9	.209	0	2
Tony Gwynn Jr.	29	42	8	.190	0	1
Hernán Iribarren	12	14	2	.143	0	1
Laynce Nix	10	12	1	.083	0	0
Mike Lamb	11	11	3	.273	0	0
Brad Nelson	9	7	2	.286	0	0
Alcides Escobar	9	4	2	.500	0	0
Ángel Salomé	3	3	0	.000	0	0
Mat Gamel	2	2	1	.500	0	0
Vinny Rottino	1	1	0	.000	0	0

=== Pitching ===
==== Starting pitchers ====
Note: G = Games pitched; IP = Innings pitched; W = Wins; L = Losses; ERA = Earned run average; SO = Strikeouts

Player	G	IP	W	L	ERA	SO
Ben Sheets	31	**198.1**	**13**	9	**3.09**	**158**
Dave Bush	31	185.0	9	**10**	4.18	109
Jeff Suppan	31	177.2	10	**10**	4.96	90
Manny Parra	32	166.0	10	8	4.39	147
C.C. Sabathia	17	130.2	11	2	1.65	128
Yovani Gallardo	4	24.0	0	0	1.88	20

==== Other pitchers ====
Note: G = Games pitched; IP = Innings pitched; W = Wins; L = Losses; ERA = Earned run average; SO = Strikeouts

Player	G	IP	W	L	ERA	SO
Carlos Villanueva	47	108.1	4	7	4.07	93
Seth McClung	37	105.1	6	6	4.02	87

==== Relief pitchers ====
Note: G = Games pitched; W = Wins; L = Losses; SV = Saves; ERA = Earned run average; SO = Strikeouts

Player	G	W	L	SV	ERA	SO
Salomón Torres	**71**	7	5	**28**	3.49	51
Brian Shouse	69	5	1	2	2.81	33
Guillermo Mota	58	5	6	1	4.11	50
Éric Gagné	50	4	3	10	5.44	38
David Riske	45	1	2	2	5.31	27
Mitch Stetter	30	3	1	0	3.20	31
Mark DiFelice	15	1	0	0	2.84	20
Tim Dillard	13	0	0	0	4.40	5
Todd Coffey	9	1	0	0	0.00	7
Derrick Turnbow	8	0	1	1	15.63	5
Julián Tavárez	7	0	1	0	8.59	10
Zach Jackson	2	0	0	0	4.91	1

=== Game log ===
2008 game log (90–72)
March (1–0)

#	Date	Opponent	Score	Win	Loss	Save	Attendance	Record
1	March 31	@ Cubs	4–3 (10)	**Gagné** (1–0)	Howry (0–1)	**Riske** (1)	41,089	1–0

April (14–12)

#	Date	Opponent	Score	Win	Loss	Save	Attendance	Record
2	April 2	@ Cubs	8–2	**Suppan** (1–0)	Lilly (0–1)		39,468	2–0
3	April 3	@ Cubs	6–3	Dempster (1–0)	**Bush** (0–1)	Wood (1)	37,973	2–1
4	April 4	Giants	13–4	**Villanueva** (1–0)	Sánchez (0–1)	**Torres** (1)	45,212	3–1
5	April 5	Giants	5–4	**Parra** (1–0)	Correia (0–1)	**Gagné** (1)	30,574	4–1
6	April 6	Giants	7–0	**Sheets** (1–0)	Zito (0–1)		44,014	5–1
7	April 8	Reds	3–2 (10)	**Torres** (1–0)	Weathers (0–1)		27,717	6–1
8	April 9	Reds	12–4	Fogg (1–1)	**Bush** (0–2)		31,313	6–2
9	April 10	Reds	4–1	Harang (1–1)	**Villanueva** (1–1)	Cordero (2)	25,023	6–3
10	April 11	@ Mets	4–2	Figueroa (1–0)	**Parra** (1–1)	Wagner (1)	46,214	6–4
11	April 12	@ Mets	5–3	**Sheets** (2–0)	Santana (1–2)	**Gagné** (2)	54,701	7–4
12	April 13	@ Mets	9–7	**Torres** (2–0)	Sosa (1–1)	**Gagné** (3)	52,794	8–4
13	April 15	@ Cardinals	6–1	Looper (3–0)	**Bush** (0–3)		39,438	8–5
14	April 16	@ Cardinals	5–4	Wainwright (2–1)	**Villanueva** (1–2)	Isringhausen (6)	40,712	8–6
15	April 17	@ Cardinals	5–3 (10)	**Shouse** (1–0)	Thompson (1–1)	**Gagné** (4)	36,850	9–6
16	April 18	@ Reds	5–2	**Sheets** (3–0)	Arroyo (0–2)	**Gagné** (5)	32,629	10–6
17	April 19	@ Reds	5–3 (10)	**Mota** (1–0)	Weathers (0–2)	**Gagné** (6)	26,410	11–6
18	April 20	@ Reds	4–3 (10)	Burton (1–1)	**Gagné** (1–1)		26,902	11–7
19	April 21	Cardinals	4–3	Franklin (1–1)	**Turnbow** (0–1)	Isringhausen (7)	31,240	11–8
20	April 22	Cardinals	9–8 (12)	**McClung** (1–0)	Isringhausen (1–1)		23,478	12–8
21	April 23	Phillies	5–4	**Stetter** (1–0)	Hamels (2–3)	**Turnbow** (1)	30,548	13–8
22	April 24	Phillies	3–1	Gordon (1–2)	**Riske** (0–1)	Lidge (5)	23,905	13–9
23	April 25	Marlins	3–0	Gregg (3–0)	**Mota** (1–1)		40,088	13–10
24	April 26	Marlins	4–3	**Torres** (3–0)	Pinto (1–1)	**Gagné** (7)	44,169	14–10
25	April 27	Marlins	3–2	Lindstrom (1–0)	**McClung** (1–1)	Gregg (4)	41,656	14–11
26	April 29	@ Cubs	10–7	**Sheets** (4–0)	Marquis (1–1)	**Gagné** (8)	39,543	15–11
27	April 30	@ Cubs	19–5	Dempster (4–0)	**Suppan** (1–1)		39,908	15–12

May (13–16)

#	Date	Opponent	Score	Win	Loss	Save	Attendance	Record
28	May 1	@ Cubs	4–3	**Shouse** (2–0)	Wood (2–1)	**Gagné** (9)	40, 849	16–12
29	May 2	@ Astros	7–4	Oswalt (3–3)	**Villanueva** (1–3)	Valverde (6)	39,715	16–13
30	May 3	@ Astros	6–2	Backe (2–3)	**Parra** (1–2)		35,002	16–14
31	May 4	@ Astros	8–6	Byrdak (1–0)	**Stetter** (1–1)		38,301	16–15
32	May 6	@ Marlins	3–0	Olsen (3–0)	**Suppan** (1–2)	Gregg (6)	10,113	16–16
33	May 7	@ Marlins	6–2	Badenhop (1–2)	**Bush** (0–4)		10,405	16–17
34	May 8	@ Marlins	7–2	Kensing (1–0)	**Villanueva** (1–4)		12,321	16–18
35	May 9	Cardinals	4–3	**Shouse** (3–0)	Isringhausen (1–4)		42,705	17–18
36	May 10	Cardinals	5–3	Springer (1–0)	**Gagné** (1–2)	Franklin (2)	43,382	17–19
37	May 11	Cardinals	5–3	**Suppan** (2–2)	Looper (5–2)	**Shouse** (1)	41,197	18–19
38	May 12	Cardinals	8–3	**Bush** (1–4)	Wainwright (3–2)	**Mota** (1)	25,757	19–19
39	May 13	Dodgers	5–3	**Villanueva** (2–4)	Penny (5–4)	**Gagné** (10)	26,465	20–19
40	May 14	Dodgers	6–4	Broxton (2–1)	**Mota** (1–2)	Saito (6)	27,562	20–20
41	May 15	Dodgers	7–2	Billingsley (3–5)	**Sheets** (4–1)		30,444	20–21
42	May 17	@ Red Sox	5–3	Matsuzaka (7–0)	**Suppan** (2–3)		37,409	20–22
43	May 17	@ Red Sox	7–6	Hansen (1–2)	**Torres** (3–1)	Timlin (1)	37,847	20–23
44	May 18	@ Red Sox	11–7	Beckett (5–3)	**Villanueva** (2–5)		37, 204	20–24
45	May 20	@ Pirates	7–2	**Parra** (2–2)	Maholm (2–5)		11,761	21–24
46	May 21	@ Pirates	4–1	**Sheets** (5–1)	Snell (2–3)		8,805	22–24
47	May 22	@ Pirates	8–4	Gorzelanny (4–4)	**Bush** (1–5)		12,887	22–25
48	May 23	@ Nationals	5–1	Sanches (1–0)	**Suppan** (2–4)		28,007	22–26
49	May 24	@ Nationals	5–2	**McClung** (2–1)	Lannan (4–5)	**Torres** (2)	30,029	23–26
50	May 25	@ Nationals	7–6	Rauch (3–1)	**Mota** (1–3)		35,567	23–27
51	May 26	@ Nationals	4–3	**Villanueva** (3–5)	Rivera (3–2)	**Torres** (3)	28,552	24–27
52	May 27	Braves	3–2	**Torres** (4–1)	Bennett (0–3)		28,872	25–27
53	May 28	Braves	1–0	**Suppan** (3–4)	Reyes (2–3)	**Torres** (4)	31,612	26–27
54	May 29	Braves	8–1	Campillo (2–0)	**McClung** (2–2)		33,334	26–28
55	May 30	Astros	5–1	**Parra** (3–2)	Backe 4–6		32,039	27–28
56	May 31	Astros	4–1	**Sheets** (6–1)	Moehler (2–2)	**Torres** (5)	42,913	28–28

June (16–10)

#	Date	Opponent	Score	Win	Loss	Save	Attendance	Record
57	June 1	Astros	10–1	**Bush** (2–5)	Chacón (2–1)		44,613	29–28
58	June 2	D-backs	4–3	**Mota** (2–3)	Slaten (0–2)	**Torres** (6)	27,562	30–28
59	June 3	D-backs	7–1	**McClung** (3–2)	Johnson (4–2)	**Shouse** (2)	29,478	31–28
60	June 4	D-backs	10–1	**Parra** (4–2)	Owings (6–4)		27,539	32–28
61	June 6	@ Rockies	6–4	Corpas (1–3)	**Mota** (2–4)	Fuentes (9)	30,558	32–29
62	June 7	@ Rockies	7–2	Reynolds (1–3)	**Bush** (2–6)		37,283	32–30
63	June 8	@ Rockies	3–2	**Suppan** (4–4)	Francis (2–6)	**Torres** (7)	32,256	33–30
64	June 10	@ Astros	6–1	Oswalt (5–6)	**McClung** (3–3)		35,058	33–31
65	June 11	@ Astros	10–6	**Parra** (5–2)	Backe (4–8)		33,806	34–31
66	June 12	@ Astros	9–6	**Sheets** (7–1)	Moehler (3–3)		35,709	35–31
67	June 13	Twins	10–2	Slowey (3–6)	**Bush** (2–7)		38,586	35–32
68	June 14	Twins	9–4	Bass (3–2)	**Tavárez** (0–1)		43,812	35–33
69	June 15	Twins	4–2	**McClung** (4–3)	Baker (2–2)	**Torres** (8)	41,693	36–33
70	June 17	Blue Jays	7–0	**Parra** (6–2)	McGowan (5–5)		37,065	37–33
71	June 18	Blue Jays	5–4	**Sheets** (8–1)	Marcum (5–4)		34,442	38–33
72	June 19	Blue Jays	8–7	**Bush** (3–7)	Burnett (6–7)	**Torres** (10)	35,173	39–33
73	June 20	Orioles	8–5	Cormier (1–2)	**Suppan** (4–5)	Sherrill (25)	36,526	39–34
74	June 21	Orioles	3–2	**McClung** (5–3)	Cabrera (5–3)	**Torres** (11)	42,521	40–34
75	June 22	Orioles	7–3	**Parra** (7–2)	Olson (5–3)	**Torres** (12)	43,517	41–34
76	June 23	@ Braves	4–1	**Sheets** (9–1)	Reyes (3–5)		25,661	42–34
77	June 24	@ Braves	4–3	**Bush** (4–7)	Morton (1–1)	**Torres** (13)	29,224	43–34
78	June 25	@ Braves	4–2	Campillo (3–2)	**Suppan** (4–6)	González (2)	34,829	43–35
79	June 27	@ Twins	7–6	Guerrier (4–2)	**Mota** (2–5)	Nathan (22)	30,104	43–36
80	June 28	@ Twins	5–1	**Parra** (8–2)	Hernández (8–5)		38,963	44–36
81	June 29	@ Twins	5–0	Slowey (5–6)	**Sheets** (9–2)		30,655	44–37
82	June 30	@ D-backs	6–3	Davis (3–3)	**Bush** (4–8)	Lyon (17)	23,040	44–38

July (16–11)

#	Date	Opponent	Score	Win	Loss	Save	Attendance	Record
83	July 1	@ D-backs	8–6	**Suppan** (5–6)	Johnson (4–7)	**Torres** (14)	21,736	45–38
84	July 2	@ D-backs	4–3	**Riske** (1–1)	Lyon (2–3)	**Torres** (15)	22,324	46–38
85	July 3	@ D-backs	6–5	Rosales (1–0)	**Torres** (4–2)		23,842	46–39
86	July 4	Pirates	9–1	**Sheets** (10–2)	Gorzelanny (6–7)	**Villanueva** (1)	41,463	47–39
87	July 5	Pirates	2–1	**Gagné** (2–2)	Yates (3–2)		39,176	48–39
88	July 6	Pirates	11–6	**Stetter** (2–1)	Bautista (1–2)		42,163	49–39
89	July 7	Rockies	4–3	Jiménez (4–8)	**McClung** (5–4)	Fuentes (14)	35,161	49–40
90	July 8	Rockies	7–3	**Sabathia** (7–8)	Redman (2–4)		42,533	50–40
91	July 9	Rockies	8–3	Rusch (2–3)	**Sheets** (10–3)		37,092	50–41
92	July 10	Rockies	11–1	**Bush** (5–8)	de la Rosa (3–5)		43,389	51–41
93	July 11	Reds	6–5	Lincoln (1–2)	**Shouse** (3–1)	Cordero (19)	41,229	51–42
94	July 12	Reds	8–2	Vólquez (12–3)	**McClung** (5–5)		43,556	51–43
95	July 13	Reds	3–2	**Sabathia** (8–8)	Weathers (2–5)		42,108	52–43
96	July 18	@ Giants	9–1	**Sabathia** (9–8)	Cain (5–8)		40,882	53–43
97	July 19	@ Giants	8–5	**Villanueva** (4–5)	Matos (0–2)	**Torres** (16)	36,852	54–43
98	July 20	@ Giants	7–4	**Parra** (9–2)	Lincecum (11–3)	**Torres** (17)	37,507	55–43
99	July 21	@ Cardinals	6–3	**Torres** (5–2)	Franklin (3–3)		41,006	56–43
100	July 22	@ Cardinals	4–3	**Shouse** (4–1)	McClellan(2–5)	**Torres** (18)	41,955	57–43
101	July 23	@ Cardinals	3–0	**Sabathia** (10–8)	Looper (9–8)		41,513	58–43
102	July 24	@ Cardinals	4–3	**Gagné** (3–2)	Franklin(3–4)	**Torres** (19)	41,233	59–43
103	July 25	Astros	3–1	Rodríguez (6–3)	**Parra** (9–3)	Valverde (26)	41,357	59–44
104	July 26	Astros	6–4	**Gagné** (4–2)	Brocail (4–5)	**Torres** (20)	43,489	60–44
105	July 27	Astros	11–6	Sampson (5–3)	**Suppan** (5–7)		41,565	60–45
106	July 28	Cubs	6–4	Gaudin (7–4)	**Torres** (5–3)	Mármol (5)	45,311	60–46
107	July 29	Cubs	7–1	Zambrano (12–4)	**Sheets** (10–4)		45,069	60–47
108	July 30	Cubs	7–2	Dempster (12–4)	**Parra** (9–4)		44,871	60–48
109	July 31	Cubs	11–4	Harden (1–1)	**Bush** (5–9)		45,346	60–49

August (20–7)

#	Date	Opponent	Score	Win	Loss	Save	Attendance	Record
110	August 1	@ Braves	9–0	**Suppan** (6–7)	James (2–4)		32,238	61–49
111	August 2	@ Braves	4–2	**Sabathia** (5–0)	Morton (2–5)	**Torres** (21)	42,096	62–49
112	August 3	@ Braves	5–0	Campillo (6–4)	**Sheets** (10–5)		21,997	62–50
113	August 4	@ Reds	6–3	Arroyo (10–8)	**Parra** (9–5)	Cordero (22)	24,706	62–51
114	August 5	@ Reds	8–1	**Bush** (6–9)	Vólquez (13–5)		24,739	63–51
115	August 6	@ Reds	6–3	**Suppan** (7–7)	Bailey (0–6)	**Torres** (22)	26,602	64–51
116	August 8	Nationals	5–0	**Sabathia** (6–0)	Balester (2–4)		43,209	65–51
117	August 9	Nationals	6–0	**Sheets** (11–5)	Redding (8–7)		42,974	66–51
118	August 10	Nationals	5–4	**Mota** (3–5)	Ayala (1–8)		42,423	67–51
119	August 11	Nationals	7–1	**Bush** (7–9)	Mock (0–3)		42,196	68–51
120	August 12	@ Padres	5–2	**Suppan** (8–7)	Baek (4–6)	**Torres** (23)	28,373	69–51
121	August 13	@ Padres	7–1	**Sabathia** (7–0)	Banks (3–5)		32,771	70–51
122	August 14	@ Padres	3–2	Peavy (9–8)	**Sheets** (11–6)	Hoffman (26)	30,145	70–52
123	August 15	@ Dodgers	5–3	Billingsley (12–9)	**Parra** (9–6)	Broxton (9)	44,547	70–53
124	August 16	@ Dodgers	4–3 (10)	**Torres** (6–3)	Broxton (3–4)	**Riske** (2)	52,889	71–53
125	August 17	@ Dodgers	7–5	Beimel (4–0)	**Villanueva** (4–6)		45,267	71–54
126	August 18	Astros	9–3	**Sabathia** (8–0)	Wolf (8–11)		41,991	72–54
127	August 19	Astros	5–2	Moehler (9–4)	**Sheets** (11–7)	Valverde (32)	41,622	72–55
128	August 20	Astros	5–2	**Parra** (10–6)	Rodríguez (7–6)	**Torres** (24)	41,419	73–55
129	August 22	Pirates	10–4	**Bush** (8–9)	Duke (4–12)		41,637	74–55
130	August 23	Pirates	6–3	**Suppan** (9–7)	Gorzelanny (6–8)	**Torres** (25)	43,293	75–55
131	August 24	Pirates	4–3 (12)	**Mota** (4–5)	Davis (1–4)		45,163	76–55
132	August 26	@ Cardinals	12–0	**Sheets** (12–7)	Wellemeyer (11–5)		41,121	77–55
133	August 27	@ Cardinals	5–3	Franklin (5–5)	**Riske** (1–2)	Perez (6)	41,433	77–56
134	August 29	@ Pirates	3–1	**Bush** (9–9)	Gorzelanny (6–9)	**Torres** (26)	18,086	78–56
135	August 30	@ Pirates	11–3	**Suppan** (10–7)	Maholm (8–8)		21,931	79–56
136	August 31	@ Pirates	7–0	**Sabathia** (9–0)	Karstens (2–4)		21,293	80–56

September (10–16)

#	Date	Opponent	Score	Win	Loss	Save	Attendance	Record
137	September 1	Mets	4–2	Figueroa (3–3)	**Gagné** (4–3)	Ayala (4)	41,476	80–57
138	September 2	Mets	6–5 (10)	Smith (3–3)	**Torres** (6–4)	Ayala (5)	36,587	80–58
139	September 3	Mets	9–2	Pérez (10–7)	**Bush** (9–10)		26,236	80–59
140	September 4	Padres	5–2	Estes (2–1)	**Suppan** (10–8)	Hoffman (28)	33,182	80–60
141	September 5	Padres	3–2 (11)	**Shouse** (5–1)	Falkenborg (2–3)		41,519	81–60
142	September 6	Padres	1–0	**Sheets** (13–7)	Peavy (9–10)		42,667	82–60
143	September 7	Padres	10–1	Young (5–5)	**Parra** (10–7)		44,568	82–61
144	September 8	Reds	5–4	Burton (5–1)	**Torres** (6–5)	Cordero (28)	30,867	82–62
145	September 9	Reds	5–4 (11)	Adkins (1–0)	**McClung** (5–6)	Cordero (29)	30,312	82–63
146	September 10	Reds	4–3	**Mota** (5–5)	Weathers (2–6)	**Torres** (27)	30,124	83–63
147	September 11	@ Phillies	6–3	Moyer (14–7)	**Sheets** (13–8)	Lidge (36)	39,994	83–64
148	September 13	@ Phillies	7–3	Hamels (13–9)	**Parra** (10–8)		45,105	83–65
149	September 14	@ Phillies	7–3	Eyre (4–0)	**Mota** (5–6)		43,950	83–66
150	September 14	@ Phillies	6–1	Myers (10–11)	**Suppan** (10–9)		39,776	83–67
151	September 16	@ Cubs	5–4	Dempster (16–6)	**Sabathia** (9–1)	Wood (31)	40,738	83–68
152	September 17	@ Cubs	6–2	**DiFelice** (1–0)	Marquis (10–9)		41,200	84–68
153	September 18	@ Cubs	7–6 (12)	Wood (5–4)	**Villanueva** (4–7)		40,678	84–69
154	September 19	@ Reds	11–2	Ramírez (1–0)	**Suppan** (10–10)		20,855	84–70
155	September 20	@ Reds	4–3	Cueto (9–13)	**Sabathia** (9–2)	Cordero (32)	24,440	84–71
156	September 21	@ Reds	8–1	**Coffey** (1–0)	Arroyo (15–11)		22,624	85–71
157	September 23	Pirates	7–5	**Torres** (7–5)	Beam (2–2)		36,612	86–71
158	September 24	Pirates	4–2	**Sabathia** (10–2)	Maholm (9–9)	**Torres** (28)	31,164	87–71
159	September 25	Pirates	5–1 (10)	**Stetter** (3–1)	Chavez (0–1)		40,102	88–71
160	September 26	Cubs	5–1	**McClung** (6–6)	Marshall (3–5)		44,084	89–71
161	September 27	Cubs	7–3	Lilly (17–9)	**Sheets** (13–9)		45,288	89–72
162	September 28	Cubs	3–1	**Sabathia** (11–2)	Howry (7–5)		45,299	90–72

== Postseason ==
For the first time in 26 years (since 1982) the Brewers reached the playoffs.

They lost 3 games to 1 to the Philadelphia Phillies in the NLDS.

2008 Playoff game log (1–3)
NLDS (1–3)

#	Date	Opponent	Score	Win	Loss	Save	Attendance	Record
1	October 1	@ Phillies	1–3	Hamels (1–0)	Gallardo (0–1)	Lidge (1)	45,929	0–1
2	October 2	@ Phillies	2–5	Myers (1–0)	Sabathia (0–1)	Lidge (2)	46,208	0–2
3	October 4	Phillies	4–1	Bush (1–0)	Moyer (0–1)	Torres (1)	43,992	1–2
4	October 5	Phillies	2–6	Blanton (1–0)	Suppan (0–1)	–	43,934	1–3

== Farm system ==
The Brewers' farm system consisted of six minor league affiliates in 2008.

Level	Team	League	Manager
Triple-A	Nashville Sounds	Pacific Coast League	Frank Kremblas
Double-A	Huntsville Stars	Southern League	Don Money
Class A-Advanced	Brevard County Manatees	Florida State League	Mike Guerrero
Class A	West Virginia Power	South Atlantic League	Jeff Isom
Rookie	Helena Brewers	Pioneer League	Rene Gonzales
Rookie	AZL Brewers	Arizona League	Tony Diggs

== General ==
- Game logs:

1st half: Milwaukee Brewers Game Log on ESPN.com
2nd half: Milwaukee Brewers Game Log on ESPN.com

- Batting statistics: Milwaukee Brewers Batting Stats on ESPN.com
- Pitching statistics: Milwaukee Brewers Pitching Stats on ESPN.com
- 2008 Milwaukee Brewers at Baseball Reference
