= Mitchell Boggs =

American baseball player (born 1984)

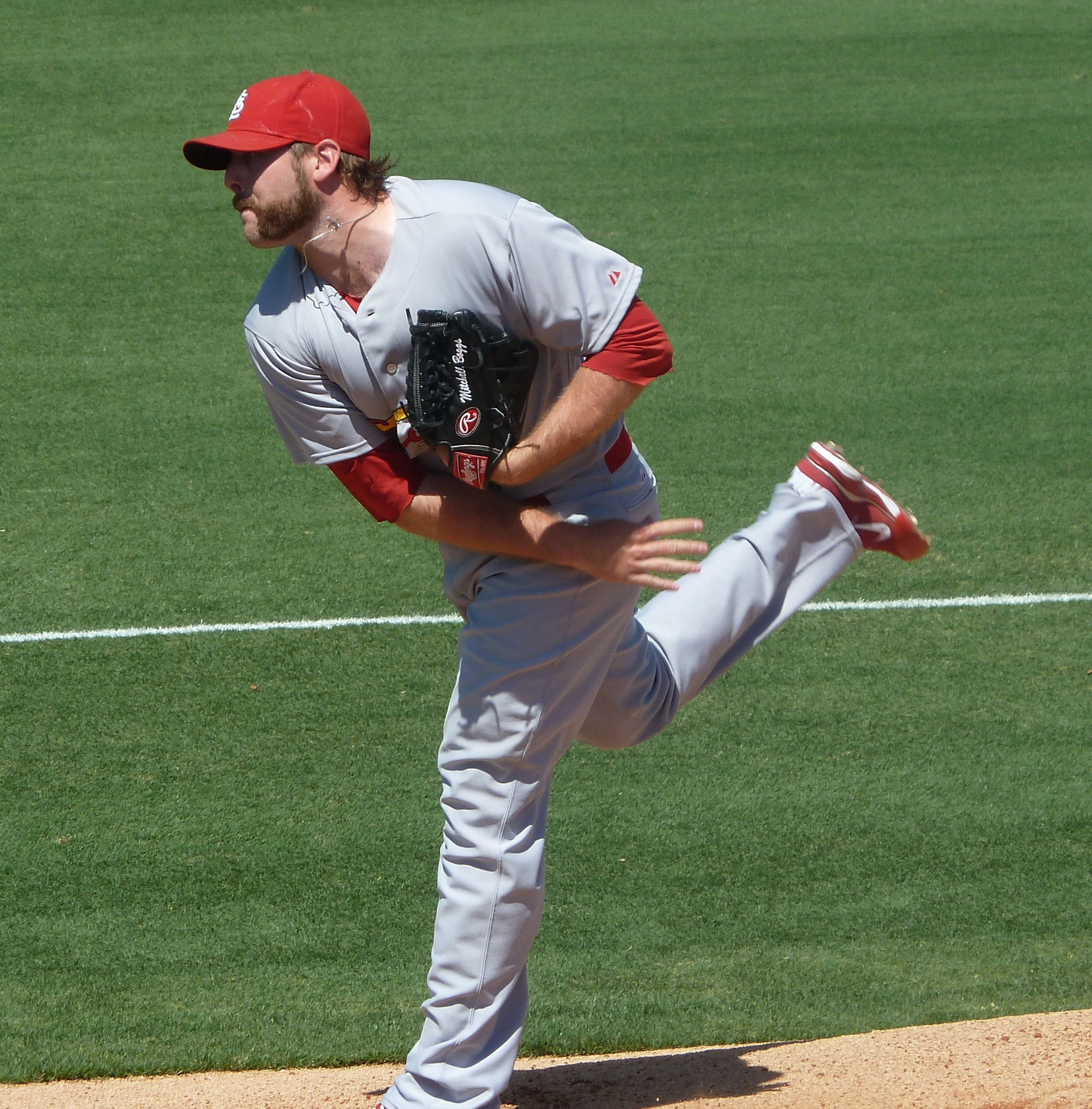
- Boggs with the St. Louis Cardinals
- Pitcher
- Born: February 15, 1984 (age 42); Dalton, Georgia, U.S.
- Batted: Right Threw: Right

MLB debut
- June 6, 2008, for the St. Louis Cardinals

Last MLB appearance
- September 27, 2013, for the Colorado Rockies

MLB statistics
- Win–loss record: 13–15
- Earned run average: 4.12
- Strikeouts: 233
- Stats at Baseball Reference

Teams
- St. Louis Cardinals (2008–2013); Colorado Rockies (2013)

Career highlights and awards
- World Series champion (2011)

Mitchell Thomas Boggs (born February 15, 1984) is an American former professional baseball pitcher. He played in Major League Baseball (MLB) for the St. Louis Cardinals and Colorado Rockies.

== High school ==
Boggs played two sports while attending Dalton High School, baseball and football. He played baseball for the Catamounts under the direction of coach Manny Pontonio. Boggs was a pitcher and also a third baseman who was recruited to be a dual-sport college star.

Boggs also played quarterback for Dalton High's football team. In his senior year, Boggs led the Catamounts to a 13–2 record, and an appearance in the AAA State Championship Game. He passed for 2,224 yards and 18 touchdowns and added 684 yards and 12 touchdowns on the ground that season.

== Collegiate career ==
Boggs signed a baseball scholarship at the University of Georgia but after one season in which he saw limited playing time, he described himself as "burned out" and transferred to the University of Tennessee at Chattanooga where he was a walk-on quarterback for the Mocs' football team. After only one semester at UTC he transferred back to UGA and helped the Bulldogs reach the 2004 College World Series. While at Georgia, Boggs pitched for the Newport Gulls of the New England Collegiate Baseball League. He appeared in 8 total games, owning a 6–0 record, including a 0.91 regular season earned run average (ERA) and two wins in the playoffs.

== Professional career ==
=== St. Louis Cardinals ===
After his junior year, Boggs left Georgia to begin his professional career. He was drafted by the St. Louis Cardinals in the fifth round of the 2005 MLB draft.

On June 6, 2008, Boggs was promoted to the MLB from the Triple-A Memphis Redbirds to replace Mike Parisi on the active roster. In 12 starts with the Redbirds in 2008 before his promotion, Boggs was 5–1 with a 3.28 ERA.

On June 10, 2008, Boggs got his first MLB start going five innings, giving up only four hits and two runs, in picking up his first victory, over the Cincinnati Reds, 7–2 in Cincinnati.

Boggs broke out in 2012, having the best year of his career. He had a record of four wins and one loss with an ERA of 2.21. He also led the National League in holds with 34.

Boggs was on the mound in the eighth inning of the 2012 National League Wild Card Game during the infamous infield fly rule call by left field umpire Sam Holbrook, in which Andrelton Simmons's fly ball to leftfield off of Boggs was ruled an out, followed by a 19-minute delay, as Braves' fans pelted the field with debris.

Boggs spent part of 2013 as the closer for St. Louis, but he was sent to the minor leagues in early May with an ERA of 12.66. He came back to the Cardinals after 18 days on May 20 and blew Michael Wacha's 2–1 lead in his debut on May 30. He was demoted a second time to AAA-Memphis the next day.

=== Colorado Rockies ===
On July 9, 2013, Boggs was traded to the Colorado Rockies for an international signing bonus. In nine games for the Rockies, Boggs posted a 3.12 ERA despite shaky command. After the season, Boggs was non-tendered by Colorado, becoming a free agent.

=== Chicago White Sox ===
On February 7, 2014, Boggs signed a one-year $1.1 million deal with the Chicago White Sox. He was released on March 23. He re-signed to a minor league deal on April 1. He was released again on July 1, 2014, after posting an ERA over 9 in 25 games.

=== San Francisco Giants ===
On July 21, 2014, Boggs was signed to a minor league deal by the San Francisco Giants. Boggs appeared in just 10 games for the Grizzlies, inducing 7 walks in just 13 innings for Fresno. He was released after the season.

=== Boston Red Sox ===
On January 5, 2015, the Boston Red Sox signed Boggs to a minor league contract.

=== Atlanta Braves ===
On April 20, 2015, Boggs signed a minor league deal with the Atlanta Braves. He was released on June 7.

== Personal life ==
Boggs married his high school sweetheart, LeLe Crutchfield, in December 2010. They have one son.

Boggs is not related to Wade Boggs.
