= Mark Worrell =

American baseball player (born 1983)

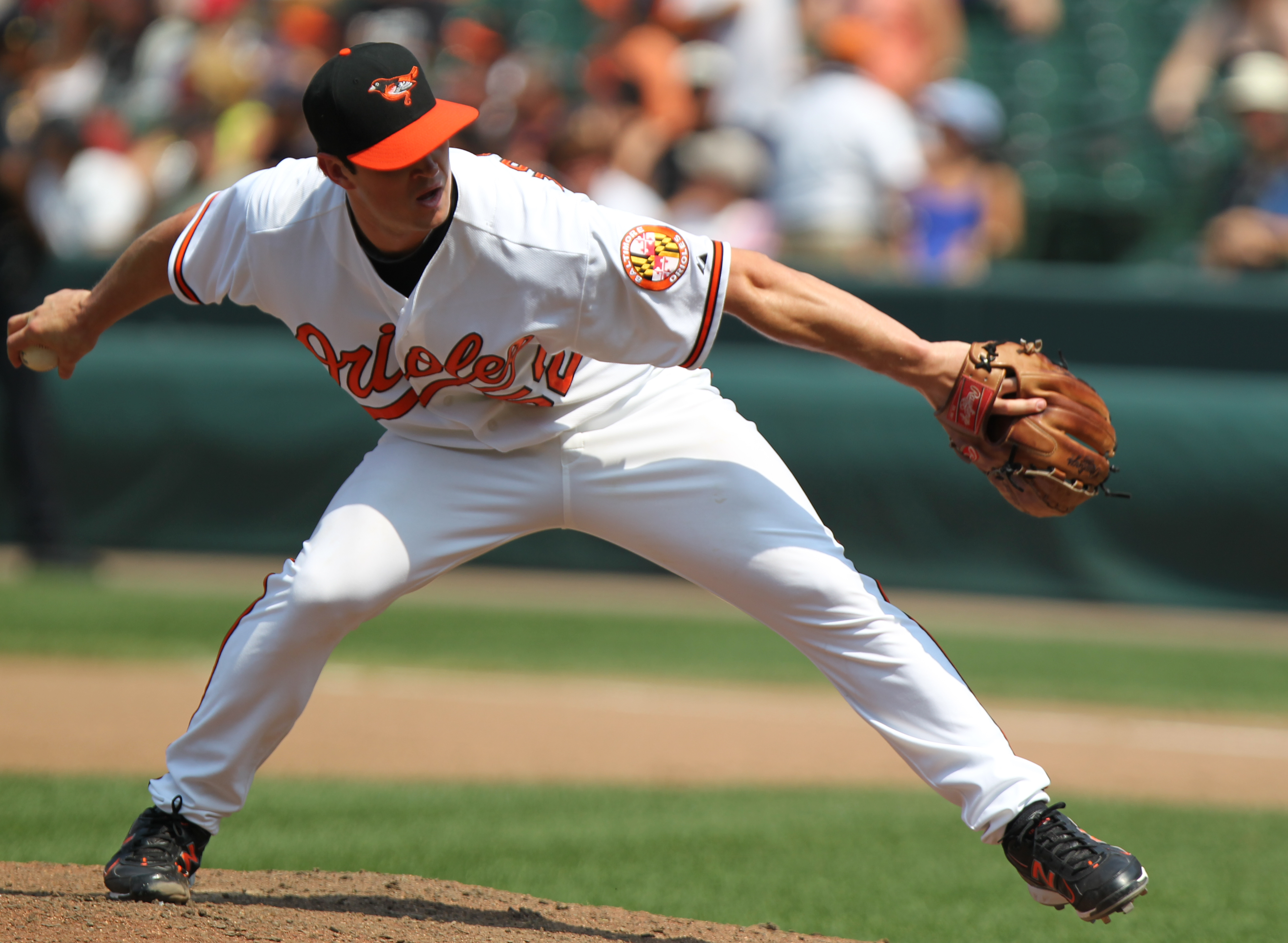
- Worrell with the Baltimore Orioles
- Relief pitcher
- Born: March 8, 1983 (age 43); Palm Beach Gardens, Florida, U.S.
- Batted: Right Threw: Right

MLB debut
- June 3, 2008, for the St. Louis Cardinals

Last MLB appearance
- July 24, 2011, for the Baltimore Orioles

MLB statistics
- Win–loss record: 0-1
- Earned run average: 15.26
- Strikeouts: 7
- Stats at Baseball Reference

Teams
- St. Louis Cardinals (2008); Baltimore Orioles (2011)

Career highlights and awards
- Hit a home run in first major league at-bat

Mark Robert Worrell (born March 8, 1983) is an American former professional baseball pitcher. He played in Major League Baseball (MLB) for the St. Louis Cardinals and Baltimore Orioles between 2008 and 2011.

== Amateur career ==
A native of Palm Beach Gardens, Florida, Worrell attended John I. Leonard Community High School. He played college baseball at the University of Arizona and Florida International University. In 2003, he played collegiate summer baseball with the Cotuit Kettleers of the Cape Cod Baseball League.

== Professional career ==
=== St. Louis Cardinals ===
Worrell was selected by the St. Louis Cardinals in the 12th round of the 2004 MLB draft.

Worrell was called up to the major leagues by the Cardinals on June 1, 2008, and made his debut on June 3. On June 5, Worrell hit a three-run home run in his first major league at-bat.

=== San Diego Padres ===
On December 4, 2008, Worrell was traded to the San Diego Padres in exchange for shortstop Khalil Greene. After missing the entire season while recovering from Tommy John surgery, Worrell was non-tendered on December 12, 2009.

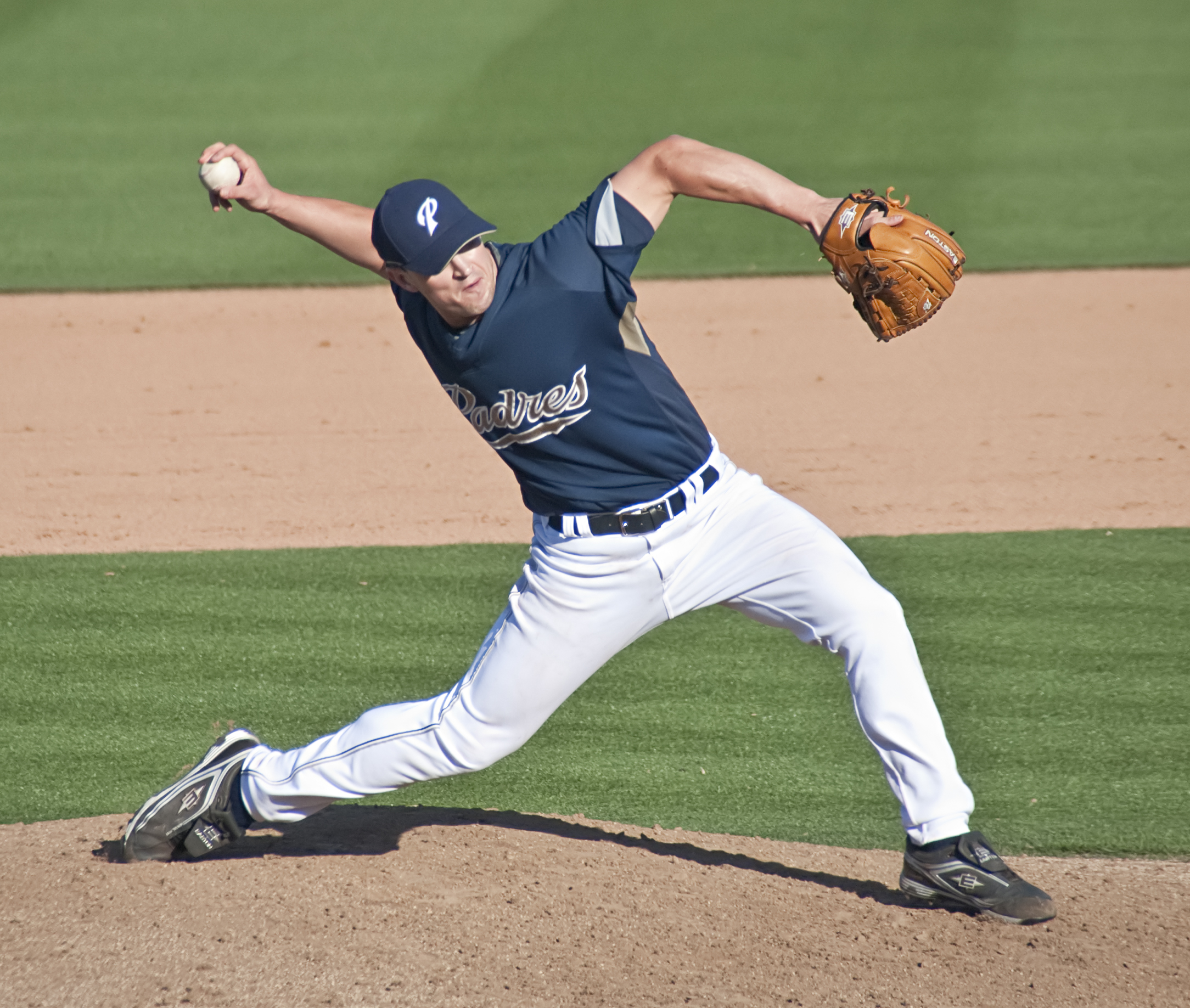
Worrell pitching for the San Diego Padres in 2009 spring training.

On January 7, 2010, Worrell signed a minor league contract to return to the San Diego Padres. After appearing in 25 games with the Portland Beavers, he was released on June 23.

=== Seattle Mariners ===
On July 1, 2010, Worrell signed a minor league contract with the Seattle Mariners, but was subsequently released on July 14 after pitching in just four games for the Tacoma Rainiers.

=== Baltimore Orioles ===
On February 1, 2011, Worrell signed a minor league contract with the Baltimore Orioles, and started the season with the Norfolk Tides. He was called up by Baltimore on July 17 and appeared in four games, giving up eight runs in two innings, including Mike Trout's first career home run, before returning to Norfolk. He became a free agent after the season.

== See also ==
- List of players with a home run in first major league at-bat
