= Rico Washington =

American baseball player (born 1978)

- Infielder
- Born: May 30, 1978 (age 48); Milledgeville, Georgia, U.S.
- Batted: Left Threw: Right

Professional debut
- MLB: April 1, 2008, for the St. Louis Cardinals
- CPBL: March 28, 2009, for the Uni-President 7-Eleven Lions

Last appearance
- MLB: April 20, 2008, for the St. Louis Cardinals
- CPBL: April 24, 2009, for the Uni-President 7-Eleven Lions

MLB statistics
- Batting average: .158
- Home runs: 0
- Runs batted in: 3

CPBL statistics
- Batting average: .297
- Home runs: 3
- Runs batted in: 12
- Stats at Baseball Reference

Teams
- St. Louis Cardinals (2008); Uni-President 7-Eleven Lions (2009)

Enrico Aliceno Washington (born May 30, 1978) is an American former professional baseball infielder. He played in Major League Baseball (MLB) for the St. Louis Cardinals and in the Chinese Professional Baseball League (CPBL) for the Uni-President 7-Eleven Lions. He graduated from Jones County High School in 1996.

== Career ==
The Pittsburgh Pirates selected Washington in the 10th round of the 1997 Major League Baseball draft out of Jones County High School. Washington played six seasons in the Pirates organization, but was unable to make the team. In 2002, he was left off the Pirates' big-league roster and thus was available for selection in baseball's Rule 5 draft, where he was taken by the San Diego Padres. Washington played in the Padres' system in 2003 and 2004, advancing to Triple-A, but did not make the big-league club and in 2004 was granted free agency. He then signed with the Tampa Bay Devil Rays and played in their farm system in 2005, then was released by Tampa Bay and signed by the Cardinals, where he spent 2006 and 2007 in the minors.

In 2008, just shy of his 30th birthday, after ten years and 3,980 at bats in the minor leagues, Washington finally made the majors when the Cardinals selected him to be on their big-league roster as a backup infielder.

He was optioned to Triple-A Memphis on April 21, 2009.

Washington signed with the Uni-President 7-Eleven Lions of the Chinese Professional Baseball League before the start of the 2009 season. At the start of the 2010 season, Washington signed with the Kansas City T-Bones of the American Association of Independent Professional Baseball, and re-signed with them for 2011. Washington played for the Gary SouthShore RailCats of the American Association in 2012.

== See also ==
- Rule 5 draft results
