= Brian Barton =

American baseball player (born 1982)

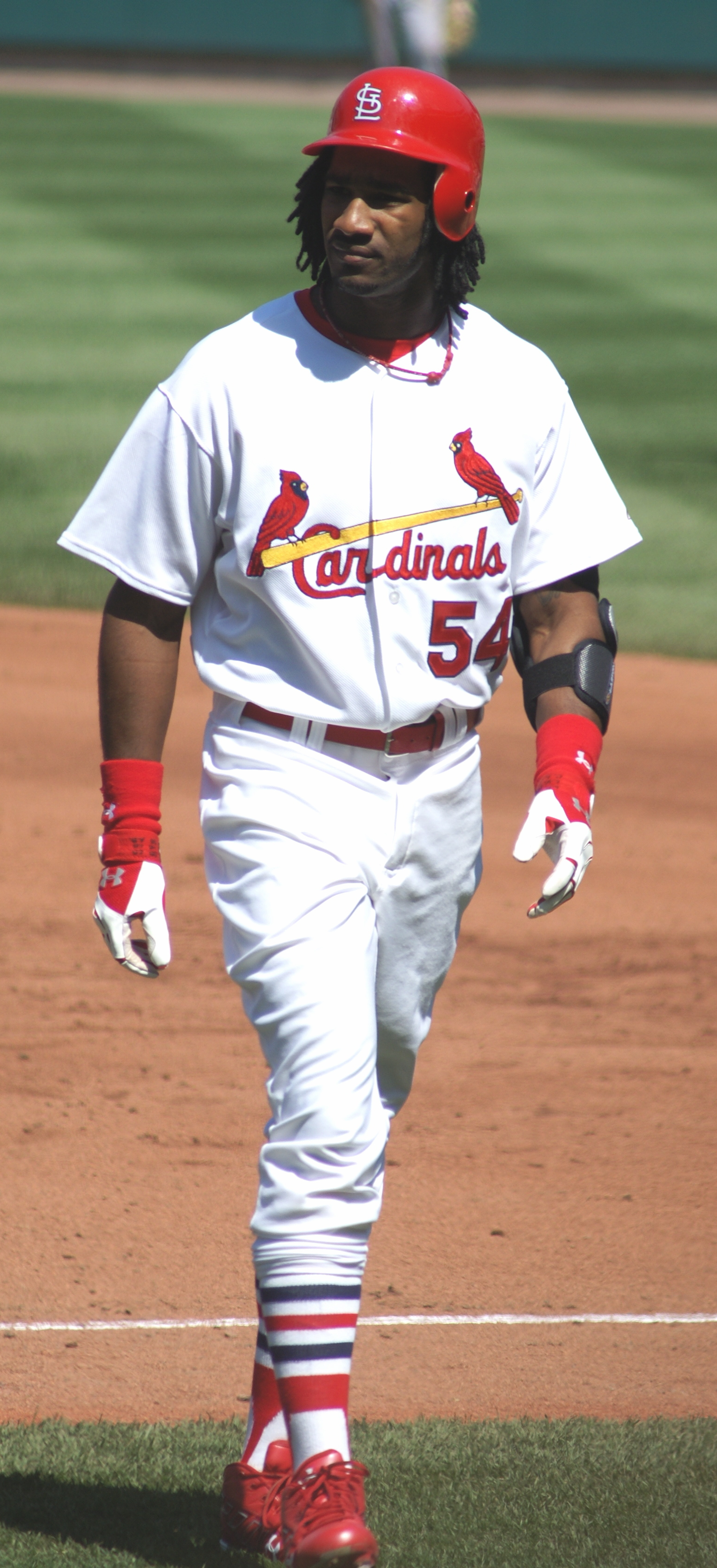
- Barton with the St. Louis Cardinals
- Outfielder
- Born: April 25, 1982 (age 43); Los Angeles, California, U.S.
- Batted: Right Threw: Right

MLB debut
- April 1, 2008, for the St. Louis Cardinals

Last MLB appearance
- June 3, 2009, for the Atlanta Braves

MLB statistics
- Batting average: .268
- Home runs: 2
- Runs batted in: 13
- Stats at Baseball Reference

Teams
- St. Louis Cardinals (2008); Atlanta Braves (2009)

Brian Deon Barton (born April 25, 1982) is an American former professional outfielder. He played in Major League Baseball (MLB) for the St. Louis Cardinals and Atlanta Braves.

== Early life ==
Barton attended Westchester High School in his hometown of Los Angeles. During his freshman year in 1997, Barton hit .407 and was the team's MVP and batting champion. In 1998, he batted .320 and led his team to the conference title. Barton led his team to the conference title again during his junior year in 1999, while batting .408 with 4 home runs and was an All-Conference Second-Team pick. In his last season at Westchester, Barton had his best season. He was once again named the team's MVP and batting champion while hitting .500 with 9 home runs, 47 RBI, and 14 stolen bases. He was also an All-City First-Team pick and was selected the All-Star Conference MVP. Above all of that, Barton's team won the conference championship.

Following his senior season, Barton entered the 2000 Major League Baseball draft. He was not selected until the 38th round, when the Los Angeles Dodgers took him as the 1,137th overall pick. Barton did not sign, opting to attend Loyola Marymount University.

== College career ==
At Loyola Marymount, he played in 33 games as a freshman in 2001. Barton batted just .196 with 2 home runs and 7 RBI in 46 at bats. Following the season, he transferred to the University of Miami.

Barton sat out the 2002 season but returned to action in 2003, batting .330 with 7 home runs and 54 RBI, leading his team to the College World Series Final 8. In 2004, Barton played in 57 games and tied for first with a .371 batting average. After the 2004 season, he played collegiate summer baseball with the Orleans Cardinals of the Cape Cod Baseball League.

== Professional career ==
=== Cleveland Indians ===
Following his final season at the University of Miami, Barton was not drafted and signed with the Cleveland Indians on August 13, 2004. Because he signed with less than one month of the season left in the minor leagues, he did not play in 2004

In 2005, Barton split the season between the Single-A Lake County Captains and the High Single-A Kinston Indians. Barton batted .414 with 4 home runs in limited action with Lake County (35 games) and .274 with 3 home runs in 64 games with Kinston. Barton earned the player of the week award twice, one while he was with Lake County and another one with Kinston.

Barton played for Kinston again in 2006 but also spent some time within Double-A with the Akron Aeros. Barton hit .308 with 13 home runs and 57 RBI with Kinston and in 42 games with Akron, batted .351 with 6 home runs and 26 RBI. Barton was awarded with the player of the week award once when he was with Kinston and was also named to the Carolina League midseason and postseason All-Star games. After the 2006 season, Barton was named by Baseball America as a High Class-A All-Star.

Barton was 86th on Baseball America's top 100 prospects for 2007 and was the fourth highest prospect in the Indians organization. Barton began the season for the Akron Aeros and in 106 games, batted .314 with 9 home runs and 59 RBI. He was also named to the Eastern League midseason All-Star game. Barton also spent some time in Triple-A with the Buffalo Bisons. His production dropped as in 25 games, he batted just .264 with a home run. Barton underwent knee surgery in September.

=== St. Louis Cardinals ===
After the 2007 season, the Indians did not add him to the 40-man roster, leaving him unprotected for the Rule 5 draft. Rumors arose that Barton was going to be selected first by the Tampa Bay Rays and then subsequently traded to the San Diego Padres. This did not happen however as the Rays took pitcher Tim Lahey from the Minnesota Twins. Barton was then selected by the St. Louis Cardinals with the 10th pick.

Barton made the Cardinals' opening day roster and made his debut on April 1, 2008, singling in his first at-bat. His first Major League home run came on May 27 against Houston Astros pitcher Shawn Chacón. In 82 games with the Cardinals, he hit .268.

=== Atlanta Braves ===
On April 20, 2009, Barton was traded to the Atlanta Braves for relief pitcher Blaine Boyer. He appeared in only one game for the Braves during the 2009 season, spending most of his time in AAA with the Gwinnett Braves. He appeared as a pinch runner and was caught stealing second in his only attempt.

=== Los Angeles Dodgers ===
Barton signed a minor league contract with the Los Angeles Dodgers on December 18, 2009. The deal included an invitation to spring training. He was released by the Dodgers on March 31, 2010.

=== Cincinnati Reds ===
In 2012 Barton signed a minor league contract with the Cincinnati Reds.

=== Atlantic League ===
Barton played in the Atlantic League in 2010 with the Newark Bears and Bridgeport Bluefish. He appeared in 102 combined games with the clubs and hit .348. And the Southern Maryland Blue Crabs in 2011.

On June 2, 2014, the Sugar Land Skeeters announced that the club has acquired Barton from the Southern Maryland Blue Crabs in exchange for future considerations.

== See also ==
- Rule 5 draft results
