= Nick Stavinoha =

American baseball player (born 1982)

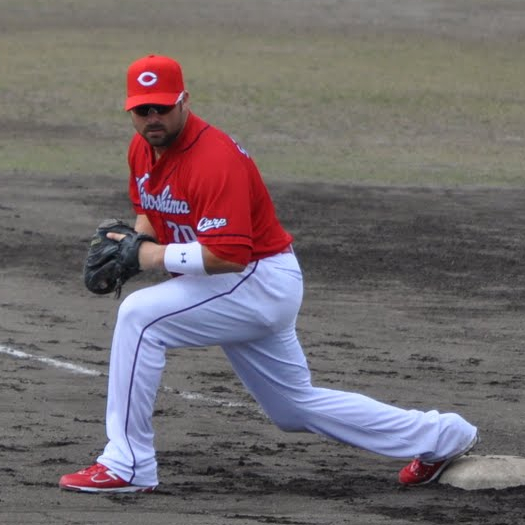
- Stavinoha with the Hiroshima Toyo Carp
- Outfielder
- Born: May 3, 1982 (age 44); Houston, Texas, U.S.
- Batted: Right Threw: Right

Professional debut
- MLB: June 22, 2008, for the St. Louis Cardinals
- NPB: March 30, 2012, for the Hiroshima Toyo Carp

Last appearance
- MLB: October 3, 2010, for the St. Louis Cardinals
- NPB: June 12, 2013, for the Hiroshima Toyo Carp

MLB statistics
- Batting average: .234
- Home runs: 4
- Runs batted in: 30

NPB statistics
- Batting average: .223
- Home runs: 10
- Runs batted in: 27
- Stats at Baseball Reference

Teams
- St. Louis Cardinals (2008–2010); Hiroshima Toyo Carp (2012–2013)

Nicholas Lee Stavinoha (born May 3, 1982) is an American former professional baseball outfielder. He played in Major League Baseball (MLB) from 2008 to 2010 for the St. Louis Cardinals.

== Early life ==
He played football and baseball at Jersey Village High School (Graduated in 2000) before attending the University of Houston for football.

He later transferred to San Jacinto College and played there for two seasons as a catcher. While at San Jacinto, Stavinoha hit 49 Home Runs and is a member of the Golden Anniversary all 50 Greatest JUCO World Series Participants.

Stavinoha went on to attend Louisiana State University. In 2003, he played collegiate summer baseball with the Wareham Gatemen of the Cape Cod Baseball League.

He is one of the few players in college baseball to participate in both the JUCO World Series in Grand Junction, Colorado (twice) and also at the NCAA D1 World Series in Omaha, Nebraska.

== Professional career ==
=== St. Louis Cardinals ===
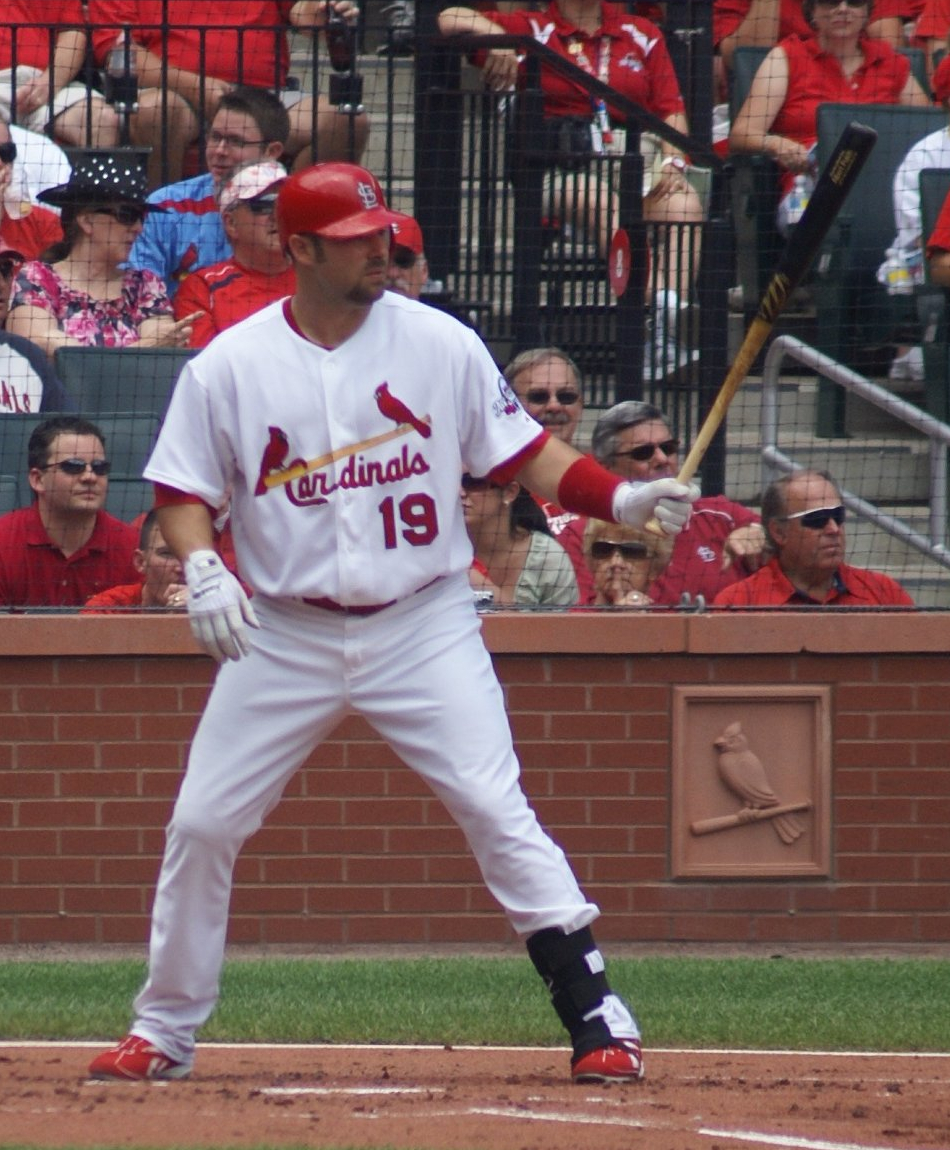
Stavinoha with the St. Louis Cardinals in 2009

Stavinoha was drafted by the Houston Astros in 2002, but did not sign. He was drafted again by the St. Louis Cardinals in the 7th round, with the 230th overall selection, of 2005 Major League Baseball draft, and signed.

He hit for a .337 average with 16 home runs for the Cardinals' Triple–A affiliate, the Memphis Redbirds in 2008. He hit .261 with 13 home runs in 2007 while stealing seven bases, also at Memphis. He hit .297 with 12 home runs at Double–A Springfield in 2006. That batting average ranked fourth among all Cardinal minor league players that played a full season. In 2005, he hit .344 with 14 home runs in 65 games at Single–A Quad Cities in 2005 as a 23–year–old. He has 55 career minor league home runs. He also has a career average of .304 in the minors.

Stavinoha made his big-league debut on June 22, 2008, as a designated hitter, and getting the first hit of his major league career against the Boston Red Sox at Fenway Park. On November 19, 2010, Stavinoha was removed from the 40–man roster and sent outright to Triple–A Memphis. He became a free agent after the 2011 season.

=== Hiroshima Toyo Carp ===
On November 9, 2011, Stavinoha signed a minor league contract with the Houston Astros that included an invitation to spring training. However, he was released on December 14, in order to sign with the Hiroshima Toyo Carp of Nippon Professional Baseball. In 52 games for the Carp in 2012, Stavinoha batted .238/.324/.431 with nine home runs and 24 RBI. In 2013, he played in 14 games for Hiroshima's main club, hitting .154/.175/.231 with one home run and three RBI.

=== Sugar Land Skeeters ===
Stavinoha signed with the Sugar Land Skeeters of the Atlantic League of Professional Baseball for the 2014 season, and was named the All–Star Game MVP at midseason. In 90 games for the Skeeters, he slashed .252/.295/.418 with 14 home runs and 54 RBI.

== Personal life ==
Stavinoha resides in Cypress, Texas with his wife, Casey, and two daughters.
