= Ángel Salomé =

Dominican baseball player (born 1986)

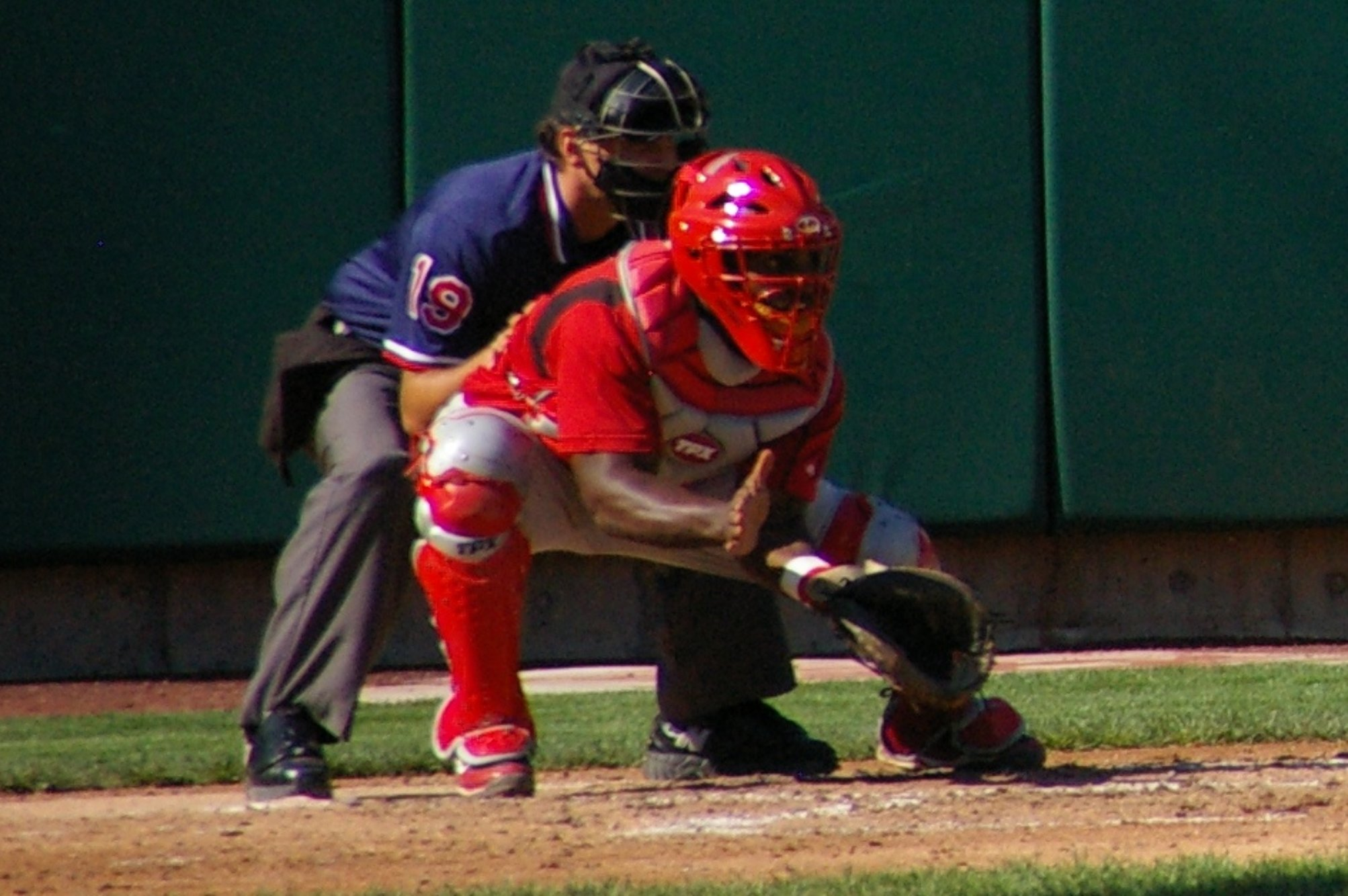
- Salomé with the Nashville Sounds in 2009
- Catcher
- Born: June 8, 1986 (age 39); Santo Domingo, Dominican Republic
- Batted: Right Threw: Right

MLB debut
- September 3, 2008, for the Milwaukee Brewers

Last MLB appearance
- September 13, 2008, for the Milwaukee Brewers

MLB statistics
- Batting average: .000
- Home runs: 0
- Runs batted in: 0
- Stats at Baseball Reference

Teams
- Milwaukee Brewers (2008)

Ángel Isaac Salomé (born June 8, 1986) is a Dominican-American former professional baseball catcher and outfielder. He played in Major League Baseball (MLB) for the Milwaukee Brewers, appearing in three games in 2008 as a pinch hitter.

== Career ==
=== Milwaukee Brewers ===
Salomé was drafted by the Milwaukee Brewers in the fifth round, with the 136th overall selection, of the 2004 Major League Baseball draft from George Washington High School in New York City. He made his professional baseball debut that summer playing for the rookie–level Arizona League Brewers.

In 2005, Salomé played for the Helena Brewers of the Rookie Pioneer League and the Single–A West Virginia Power in the South Atlantic League. He led the Pioneer League with a .415 batting average. Salomé won the Pioneer League Most Valuable Player Award, was named to its postseason All-Star team, and chosen as a Baseball America Rookie All-Star. He played the entire 2006 season at West Virginia, where he was selected for the South Atlantic League's midseason and postseason All-Star teams. In 2007, Salomé was promoted to the High–A Brevard County Manatees in the Florida State League. Salomé reached Double–A in 2008, playing in the Southern League for the Huntsville Stars. He led the circuit with a .360 average and was selected for the league's midseason and postseason All-Star squads and was chosen as a Baseball America Double-A All-Star.

Salomé was a September call-up after the season at Huntsville and made his major league debut with the Milwaukee Brewers on September 3, 2008. Pinch-hitting for the pitcher in the seventh inning, Salomé flew out in his only at bat. He pinch hit in two other games that season, striking out on September 7 and grounding out on September 13. These three were to be his only major league plate appearances. After the season, he participated in the Arizona Fall League with the Peoria Javelinas.

Salomé spent the entire 2009 season with the Brewers' Triple–A Nashville Sounds in the Pacific Coast League. That offseason, he played in the Dominican Winter League with the Toros del Este. He began the 2010 season with Nashville, but left the team in May to deal with an undisclosed mental issue. Returning to action, he was assigned to Huntsville. There, though once a top catching prospect for Milwaukee, Salomé requested a change to the outfield, which was granted, effectively ending his career as a catcher. Reassigned to Brevard County, he was subsequently outrighted from Milwaukee's 40-man roster on July 2, 2010. He elected to become a free agent after the season on November 6.

=== Seattle Mariners ===
On April 15, 2011, Salomé signed a minor league contract with the Seattle Mariners. Salomé began the season with the rookie–level Arizona League Mariners on injury rehabilitation assignment. He was later moved up to the High Desert Mavericks of the High–A California League for five games before being reassigned to the Arizona League for the rest of the season. In 22 total games, he slashed .381/.411/.631 with three home runs and 14 RBI. Salomé was released by the Mariners organization on March 5, 2012.
