= Todd Wellemeyer =

American baseball player (born 1978)

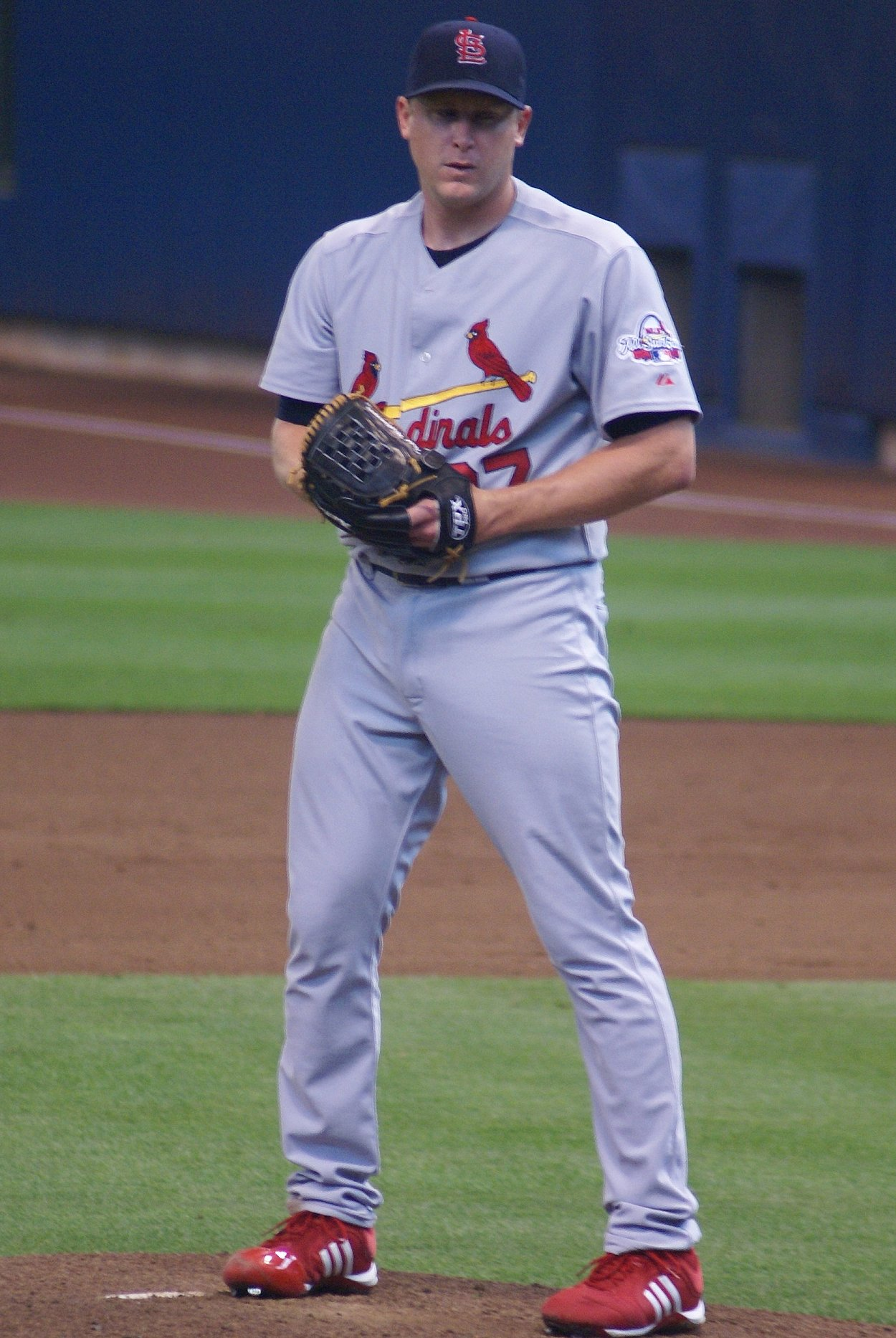
- Wellemeyer with the St. Louis Cardinals in 2009
- Pitcher
- Born: August 30, 1978 (age 47); Louisville, Kentucky, U.S.
- Batted: Right Threw: Right

MLB debut
- May 15, 2003, for the Chicago Cubs

Last MLB appearance
- August 8, 2010, for the San Francisco Giants

MLB statistics
- Win–loss record: 32–34
- Earned run average: 4.83
- Strikeouts: 459
- Stats at Baseball Reference

Teams
- Chicago Cubs (2003–2005); Florida Marlins (2006); Kansas City Royals (2006–2007); St. Louis Cardinals (2007–2009); San Francisco Giants (2010)

Todd Allen Wellemeyer (born August 30, 1978) is an American former right-handed pitcher in Major League Baseball. He played in the Major Leagues across eight years, for five teams, working as both a starting and relief pitcher.

== Professional career ==
=== Chicago Cubs (2003–2005) ===
While attending Bellarmine University, he was drafted by the Chicago Cubs and became the first Chicago Cub to earn a save in his Major League debut, earning it by striking out three batters in order against Milwaukee in the 17th inning.

Wellemeyer also picked up the win in the longest scoreless game ever played in Wrigley Field history. He struck out 4 in only 2 innings in a 1-0 marathon 16-inning game.

=== Florida Marlins (2006) ===
Wellemeyer was traded in the offseason and appeared in 18 games before being traded to the Kansas City Royals.

=== Kansas City Royals (2006–2007) ===
Wellemeyer appeared in 28 games and had a 3.63 ERA for the Royals.

In 2007, through 10 games Wellemeyer had a 10.34 ERA and was traded to the St. Louis Cardinals.

=== St. Louis Cardinals (2007–2009) ===
After being traded by the Royals, Wellemeyer had a 3–2 record with a 3.11 ERA in 20 games (11 starts).

His best season came in 2008 with the St. Louis Cardinals, when he went 13–9 with a team best (among qualified starters) 3.71 ERA. During the 2008 season he also won Pitcher of the Month honors for May, when he went 4–0 with a 2.19 ERA. He finished 2008 ranked 18th in the NL in Wins, and 16th in the NL in ERA (3.71).

In 2009, Wellemeyer had his worst full season in the Majors, posting an ERA over 5.50 and had a 7–10 record.

Wellemeyer was born on the same day as fellow pitcher Cliff Lee. He also shares a birthday with former St. Louis Cardinals teammate Adam Wainwright.

=== San Francisco Giants (2010) ===
On February 10, 2010, Wellemeyer signed a minor league contract with the San Francisco Giants, He had his contract selected to the major league roster on April 4, he was named as the fifth starter.

Until his injury on June 10, 2010, Wellemeyer had nine starts posting a 3–5 record with an ERA of 5.52. The injury opened the door for Madison Bumgarner. Wellemeyer pitched his final game with the Giants on August 8 against the Braves. He was designated for assignment on August 9. He was released on August 17.

=== Chicago Cubs ===
On January 25, 2011, Wellemeyer signed a non-guaranteed one-year contract to return to the Chicago Cubs.

Wellemeyer retired on May 7, 2011.

== Post-retirement ==
Since retirement Wellemeyer has opened a number of restaurants including the El Taco Luchador chain of taco restaurants. Taco Luchador is a privately held company.

== See also ==
- List of people from the Louisville metropolitan area

| Preceded by Brandon Webb | National League Pitcher of the month May 2008 | Succeeded by Dan Haren |
