= Brian Shouse =

American baseball player (born 1968)

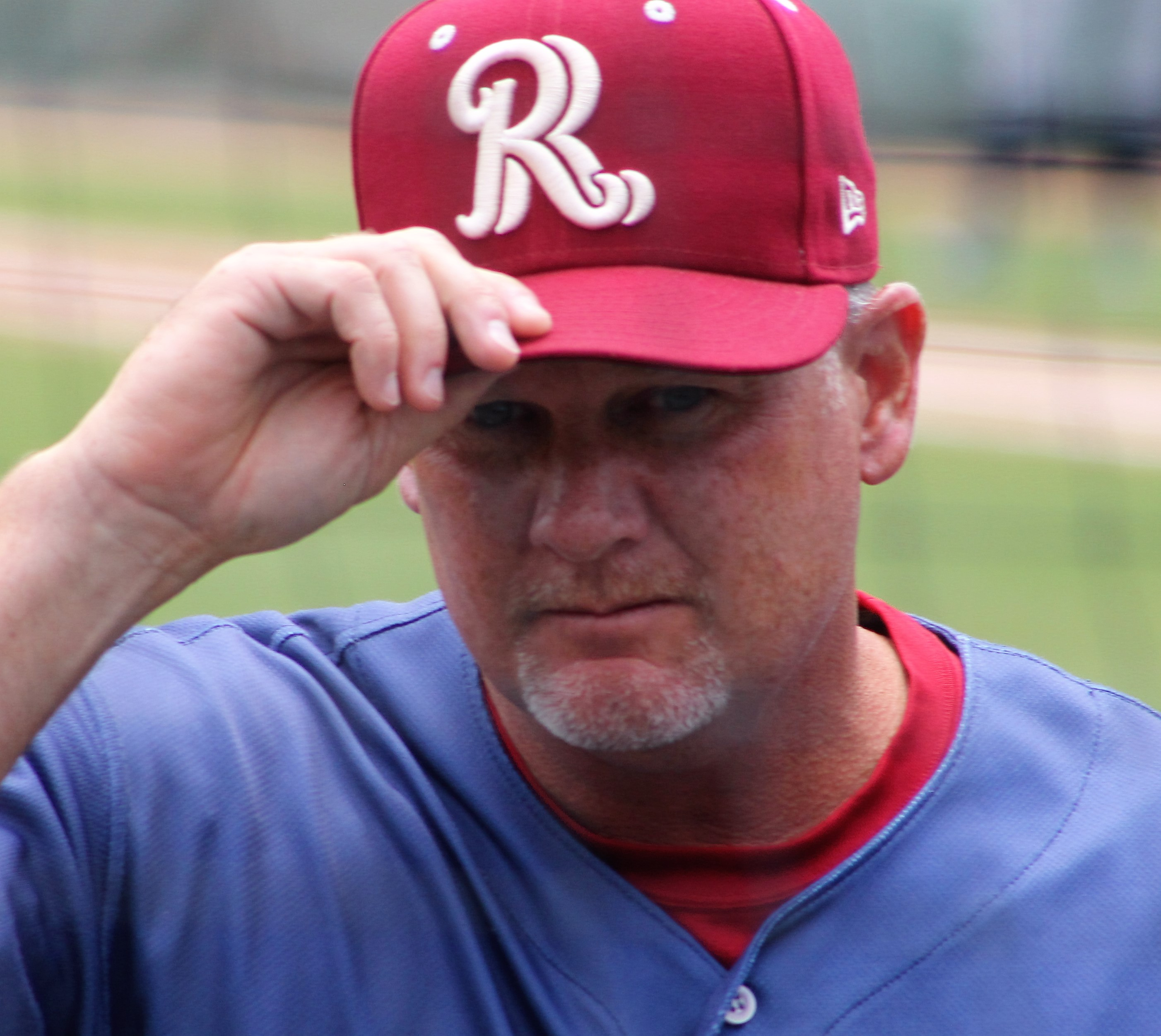
- Shouse in May 2016
- Pitcher
- Born: September 26, 1968 (age 57); Effingham, Illinois, U.S.
- Batted: Left Threw: Left

Professional debut
- MLB: July 31, 1993, for the Pittsburgh Pirates
- NPB: July 8, 1998, for the Kintetsu Buffaloes

Last appearance
- NPB: September 1, 1998, for the Kintetsu Buffaloes
- MLB: October 1, 2009, for the Tampa Bay Rays

MLB statistics
- Win–loss record: 13–10
- Earned run average: 3.72
- Strikeouts: 233

NPB statistics
- Win–loss record: 0–2
- Earned run average: 6.49
- Strikeouts: 20
- Stats at Baseball Reference

Teams
- Pittsburgh Pirates (1993); Boston Red Sox (1998); Kintetsu Buffaloes (1998); Kansas City Royals (2002); Texas Rangers (2003–2006); Milwaukee Brewers (2006–2008); Tampa Bay Rays (2009)

Brian Douglas Shouse (born September 26, 1968) is an American former professional baseball relief pitcher and Minor League pitching coach. He played in Major League Baseball (MLB) for the Pittsburgh Pirates, Boston Red Sox, Kansas City Royals, Texas Rangers, Milwaukee Brewers, and Tampa Bay Rays. Starting in 2001, Shouse pitched with a distinctive sidearm delivery, which replaced his earlier, more traditional, overhand delivery.

== Career ==
He grew up in Effingham, Illinois. Shouse played college baseball at Bradley University in Peoria, Illinois from 1987 until 1990, when he signed with the Pirates after being drafted in the 13th round of the 1990 MLB draft. He is in the Bradley Braves Hall of Fame.

Shouse made his MLB debut in 1993, appearing in 6 games that season for the Pittsburgh Pirates. He would then spend several years in the minor leagues of the Pirates and Baltimore Orioles organizations and would not appear in the major leagues again until 1998, with the Boston Red Sox. Again, Shouse would experience a long drought from the major leagues after 1998 bouncing around the minor league organizations of the Arizona Diamondbacks, Baltimore Orioles, New York Mets and Houston Astros. His next MLB appearance would be in 2002 with the Kansas City Royals.

Shouse finally broke into the MLB to stay with the Texas Rangers, where he played from 2003-2006. During that time, he was effective as a reliever, earning 34 holds in 3+ years. As he began his fourth year with the Rangers, Shouse was traded in May to the Brewers for minor league prospect Enrique Cruz.

From 2006 through 2008, Shouse was a reliable member of the Milwaukee Brewers bullpen. He was usually used as a left-handed specialist along with his teammate Mitch Stetter. On February 10, 2009, Shouse signed a one-year deal with the Tampa Bay Rays with an option for 2010. On November 18, 2009 Shouse's option was declined by the Tampa Bay Rays. On January 13, 2010, Shouse agreed to a minor league deal with the Boston Red Sox. He was released on March 26. On July 5, 2010, Shouse agreed to a minor league deal with the Tampa Bay Rays.

Shouse retired on December 1, 2010.

After their retirements, St. Louis Cardinals outfielders Rick Ankiel and Chris Duncan both separately named Shouse the toughest pitcher they faced in their careers.

== Coaching career ==
=== Texas Rangers ===
Shouse rejoined the Texas Rangers organization as a pitching coach in 2012. He spent 2012-2015 as the pitching coach of the Arizona Rangers of the Rookie-level Arizona League. He spent the 2016 and 2017 season as the pitching coach of the Frisco RoughRiders of the Double-A Texas League. He spent the 2018 season as the pitching coach of the Round Rock Express of the Triple-A Pacific Coast League. He was the pitching coach of the Nashville Sounds of the Triple-A Pacific Coast League in 2019. Shouse was released by the Rangers following the 2019 season.
