= Mike Parisi =

American baseball player (born 1983)

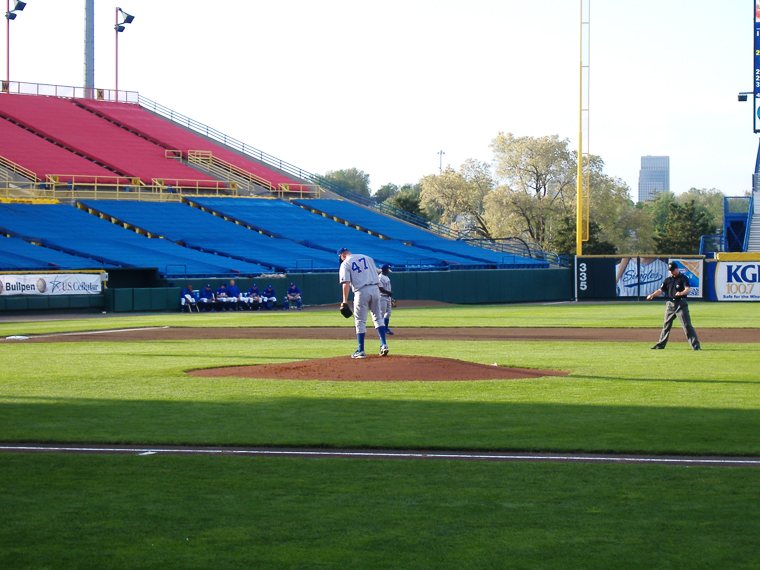
- Pitcher
- Born: April 18, 1983 (age 43); Lake Grove, New York, U.S.
- Batted: Right Threw: Right

MLB debut
- May 5, 2008, for the St. Louis Cardinals

Last MLB appearance
- June 26, 2008, for the St. Louis Cardinals

MLB statistics
- Win–loss record: 0-4
- Earned run average: 8.22
- Strikeouts: 13
- Stats at Baseball Reference

Teams
- St. Louis Cardinals (2008)

Michael Richard Parisi (born April 18, 1983) is an American former professional baseball pitcher. He played for the St. Louis Cardinals of Major League Baseball in 2008.

== Amateur career ==
Parisi went to Manhattan College and was a pitcher for the Jaspers under head coach Steve Trimper. In 2002, he played collegiate summer baseball with the Wareham Gatemen of the Cape Cod Baseball League.

== Professional career ==
=== St. Louis Cardinals ===
He was drafted in the 9th round of the 2004 MLB draft by the St. Louis Cardinals. He also was invited to spring training in 2007 and 2008. On November 20, 2007, Parisi was added to the Cardinals 40-man roster in order to keep him from being lost in the Rule 5 draft. On May 4, 2008, Parisi was called up to the big-league club. Parisi made his MLB debut on May 5, 2008 at Coors Field against the Colorado Rockies. He pitched a scoreless inning of relief and his first career strikeout was against Matt Herges. He pitched in a total of 12 games for the Cardinals in 2008, with 2 starts. His ERA was 8.22 and he had 13 strikeouts and 15 walks. On November 20, 2008, the Cardinals outrighted him to its AAA affiliate (Memphis Redbirds).

=== Chicago Cubs ===
On December 10, 2009, the Chicago Cubs selected Parisi from the Cardinals in the Rule 5 draft. He played in the Cubs minor league system of the Cubs in 2010 for the Tennessee Smokies and the Iowa Cubs. He was released by the Cubs on March 23, 2011.

=== Long Island Ducks ===
He signed with the Long Island Ducks shortly afterwards. For the Ducks he posted a 6-4 record while posting a 3.50 ERA. He was one of seven Ducks who were selected to the 2011 Atlantic League All-Star Game. During the middle of the 2011 season, he was picked up by the Los Angeles Dodgers and assigned to the Albuquerque Isotopes soon after.

=== Los Angeles Dodgers ===
His contract was purchased by the Los Angeles Dodgers on July 19, 2011 and he was assigned to the AAA Albuquerque Isotopes. He made 9 starts for Albuquerque, with a 6-2 record and 5.20 ERA. In 2012, he also made 9 starts for the Isotopes and was 1-1 with a 2.72 ERA. He left a game on May 28 due to shoulder pain and spent the rest of the season on the disabled list.

=== Bridgeport Bluefish ===
Parisi pitched for the Bridgeport Bluefish of the Atlantic League of Professional Baseball in 2013.
