= 2009 Milwaukee Brewers season =

2009 Milwaukee Brewers
- League: National League
- Division: Central
- Ballpark: Miller Park
- City: Milwaukee
- Record: 80–82 (.494)
- Divisional place: 3rd
- Owners: Mark Attanasio
- General managers: Doug Melvin
- Managers: Ken Macha
- Television: WMLW-CA; FSN Wisconsin (Brian Anderson, Bill Schroeder)
- Radio: 620 WTMJ (Bob Uecker, Cory Provus)
- Stats: ESPN.com; Baseball Reference

The Milwaukee Brewers' 2009 season was the 40th season for the franchise in Milwaukee and 41st overall. It was Ken Macha's first season as manager of the team. The Brewers failed to improve on their 90–72 record of a year ago and missed the post season, finishing with a losing record of 80–82.

== Offseason moves ==
=== Pitchers ===
Starting pitchers CC Sabathia, who was acquired from the Cleveland Indians in a mid-season trade in 2008, and Ben Sheets both rejected arbitration and became free agents following the end of the 2008 season. Numerous teams showed interest in Sabathia, considered one of the best free agent pitchers available after compiling an 11–2 record and an ERA of only 1.62 in 17 starts for the Brewers in 2008. The Brewers made a 5-year, $100 million contract offer to Sabathia, but he elected to sign with the New York Yankees on December 9, receiving a 7-year, $161 million contract that was the largest received by a pitcher at the time. No serious attempt was made to resign Sheets, who had been the Brewers' ace before the acquisition of Sabathia but struggled with numerous injuries throughout his career.

In the bullpen, closer Salomón Torres elected to retire from baseball despite believing that it would have been "a given" that the Brewers would exercise their 2009 contract option on him. After a disappointing 2008 season, former closer Éric Gagné was not offered arbitration. Left-handed specialist Brian Shouse was offered arbitration, but instead chose to sign with the Tampa Bay Rays. No attempt was made to resign Guillermo Mota, who eventually signed with the Los Angeles Dodgers.

Needing to acquire at least one starter to fill the hole in the rotation left by Sabathia and Sheets, the Brewers signed free agent Braden Looper, formerly of the St. Louis Cardinals, to a one-year, $4.5 million contract for 2009. To replace the retired Torres, the Brewers turned to all-time saves leader Trevor Hoffman, who became available after contentious contract negotiations caused the San Diego Padres, Hoffman's home for 16 years, to pull back their 2009 contract offer. Hoffman was signed to a one-year, $6 million contract for the Brewers. Relievers Todd Coffey, who was signed to a one-year contract avoiding arbitration after being claimed off waivers in September, and free agent Jorge Julio rounded out the offseason bullpen acquisitions.

=== Position players ===
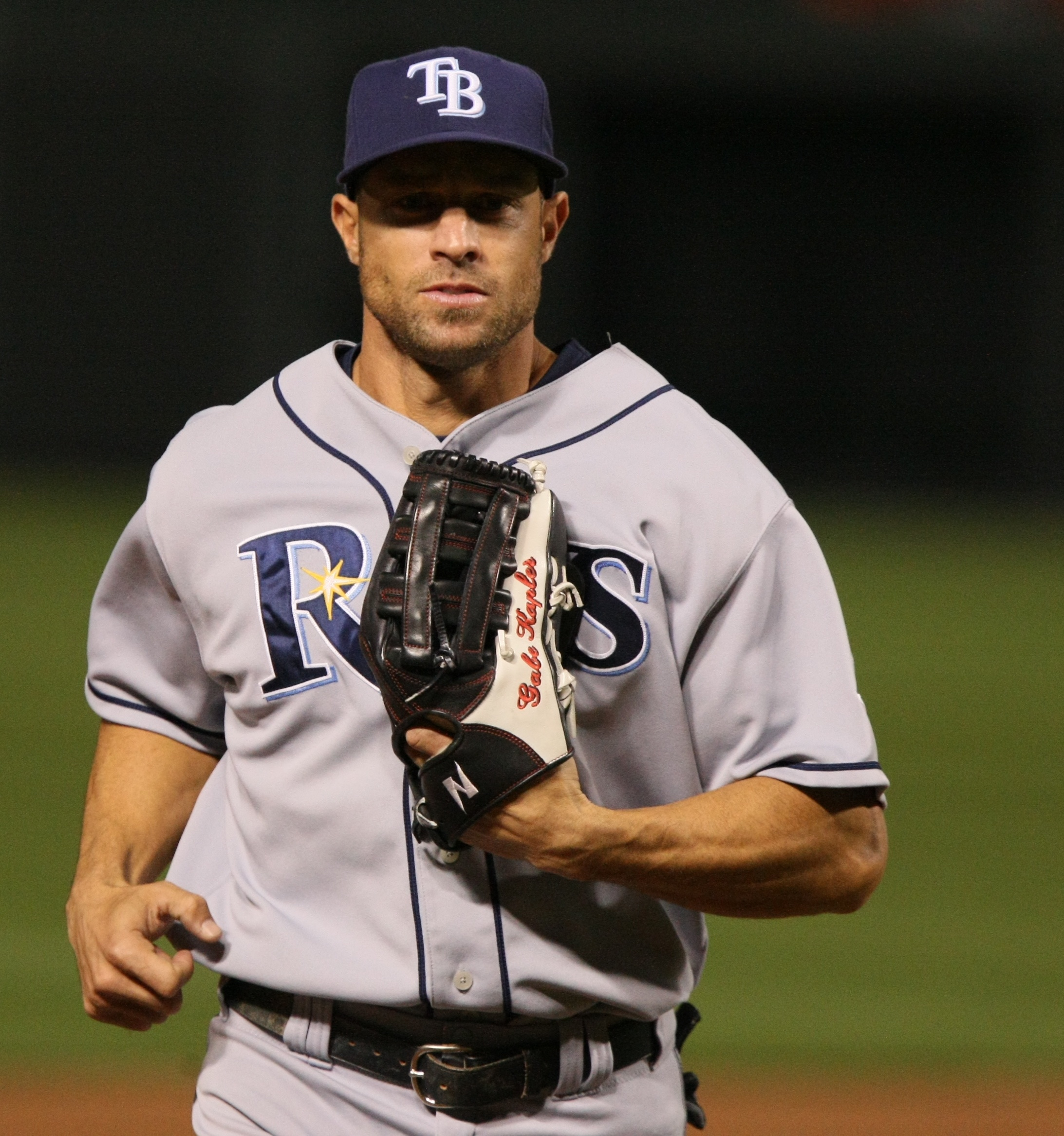
Gabe Kapler

Outfielder Gabe Kapler, second baseman Ray Durham, and third baseman Russell Branyan all became free agents following the end of the 2008 season; Kapler and Branyan signed one-year contracts with the Tampa Bay Rays and the Seattle Mariners respectively, while Durham remained unsigned. Center fielder Mike Cameron's $10 million contract option for 2009 was exercised by the Brewers. Utility infielder Craig Counsell's $3.4 million contract option was declined by the Brewers, making him a free agent, but the team later agreed to terms on a new one-year, $1 million contract in late January.

=== Coaching staff ===
Having made the move of firing manager Ned Yost with only 12 games remaining in the 2008 season, an early priority for the Brewers was the hiring of a permanent replacement for Yost. Candidates considered included interim manager Dale Sveum, former Oakland Athletics manager Ken Macha, former New York Mets manager Willie Randolph, and broadcaster and former Arizona Diamondbacks manager Bob Brenly. On October 30, 2008, the Brewers announced the hiring of Macha, who received a two-year contract to manage the club. In an unusual move, Macha proceeded to hire two of his competitors for his coaching staff, naming Randolph the bench coach and Sveum the hitting coach. Although the Brewers offered pitching coach Mike Maddux a new contract, they were unable to match the offer made by the Texas Rangers. Bullpen coach Bill Castro was promoted to pitching coach, while Nashville Sounds pitching coach Stan Kyles was promoted to fill the vacated bullpen coach position. Brad Fischer was hired as third base coach to round out Macha's new staff.

== Spring training ==
The Brewers opened spring training camp on February 13, with the first game played on February 25. Home games were played at Maryvale Baseball Park in Phoenix, Arizona. The Brewers compiled a 22–10–3 record in spring training games, the best record of any National League team and the second-best record (behind the Los Angeles Angels of Anaheim) in the Cactus League.

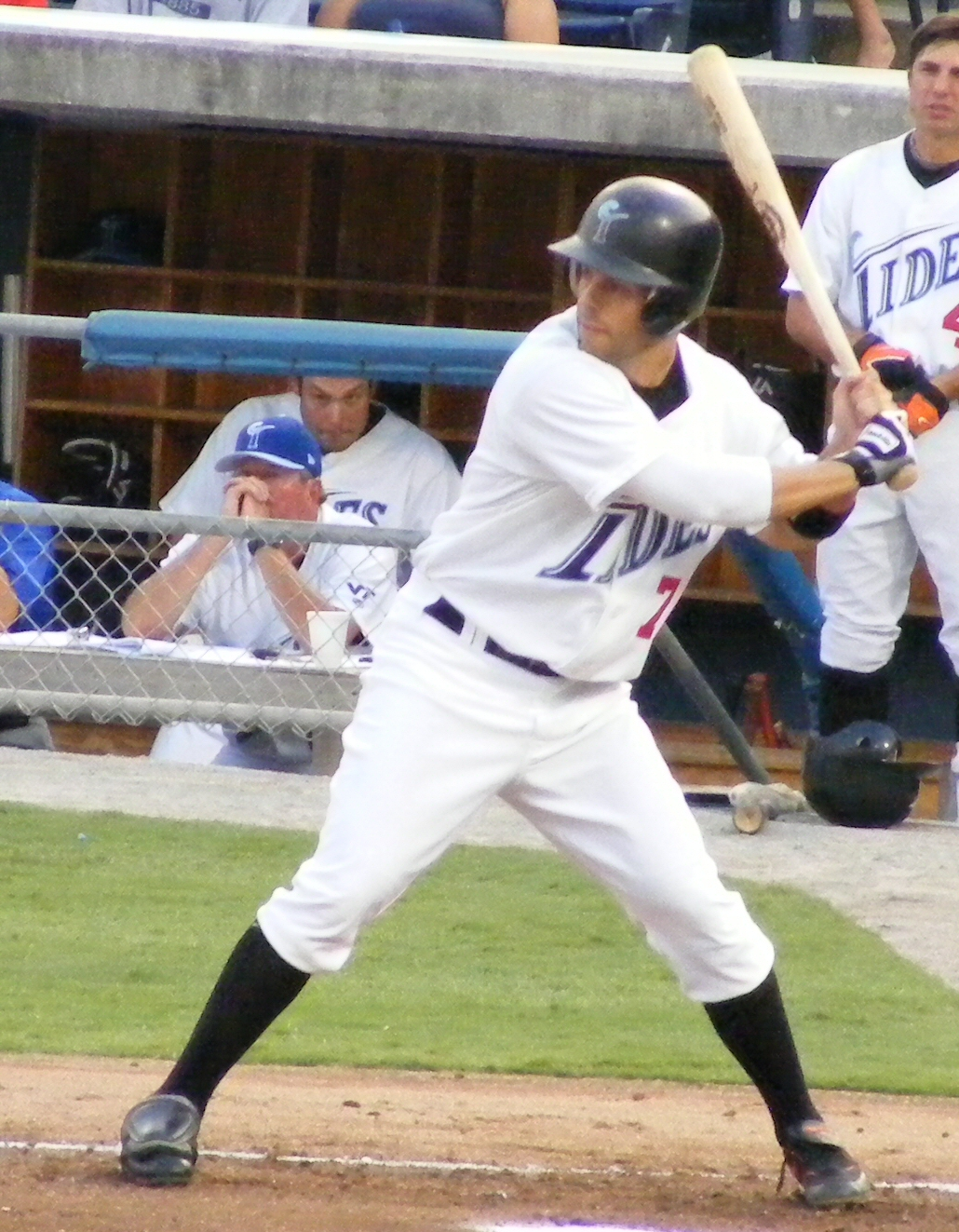
Adam Stern

The 2009 spring training season was affected by the 2009 World Baseball Classic, which was held in March. Six players in the Brewers system played in the Classic and missed time during spring training: left fielder Ryan Braun (Team USA), relief pitcher Mark DiFelice (Team Italy), and minor league players Vinny Rottino (Team Italy), Adam Stern (Team Canada), Brett Lawrie (Team Canada), and David Welch (Team Australia). Additionally, the Brewers played an exhibition game against Team Australia, winning by the score of 10 to 5.

With the lineup and starting rotation largely set, the main position battles entering camp were for spots in the bullpen and on the bench. Ultimately, the available bench spots were claimed by infielder Casey McGehee, who had been claimed off waivers from the Chicago Cubs during the offseason, center fielder Chris Duffy, who was invited to camp as a non-roster invitee, and outfielder Brad Nelson, the Brewers' fourth-round draft pick in 2001. Mike Lamb, who had been expected to make the club before McGehee's strong spring, was released by the team on April 1; he was eventually signed to a minor league deal by the New York Mets. Closer Trevor Hoffman suffered an oblique strain in mid-March and was forced to begin the regular season on the disabled list.

== Regular season ==
=== April ===
The Brewers opened the regular season on the road on April 7 with a loss against the San Francisco Giants; Jeff Suppan made his first Opening Day start for the Brewers and fourth overall. The Brewers won their home opener three days later with a ninth inning rally over the rival Chicago Cubs. Overall, however, the team struggled during the first few weeks of the season, losing four consecutive series against the Giants, the Cubs, the Cincinnati Reds, and the New York Mets. The Brewers' pitching staff struggled early, compiling a 5.19 ERA during the first four series. Manny Parra, the number three starter in the rotation, particularly struggled and finished the month with an 0–4 record with a 6.52 ERA, and Suppan went 1–2 with a 5.88 ERA. The team's fortunes improved considerably after an 11–4 loss to the Philadelphia Phillies on April 21, however, as the Brewers won series against the Phillies and the Houston Astros before returning home and sweeping the Pittsburgh Pirates to close the month, rallying to a 12–10 overall record in April.

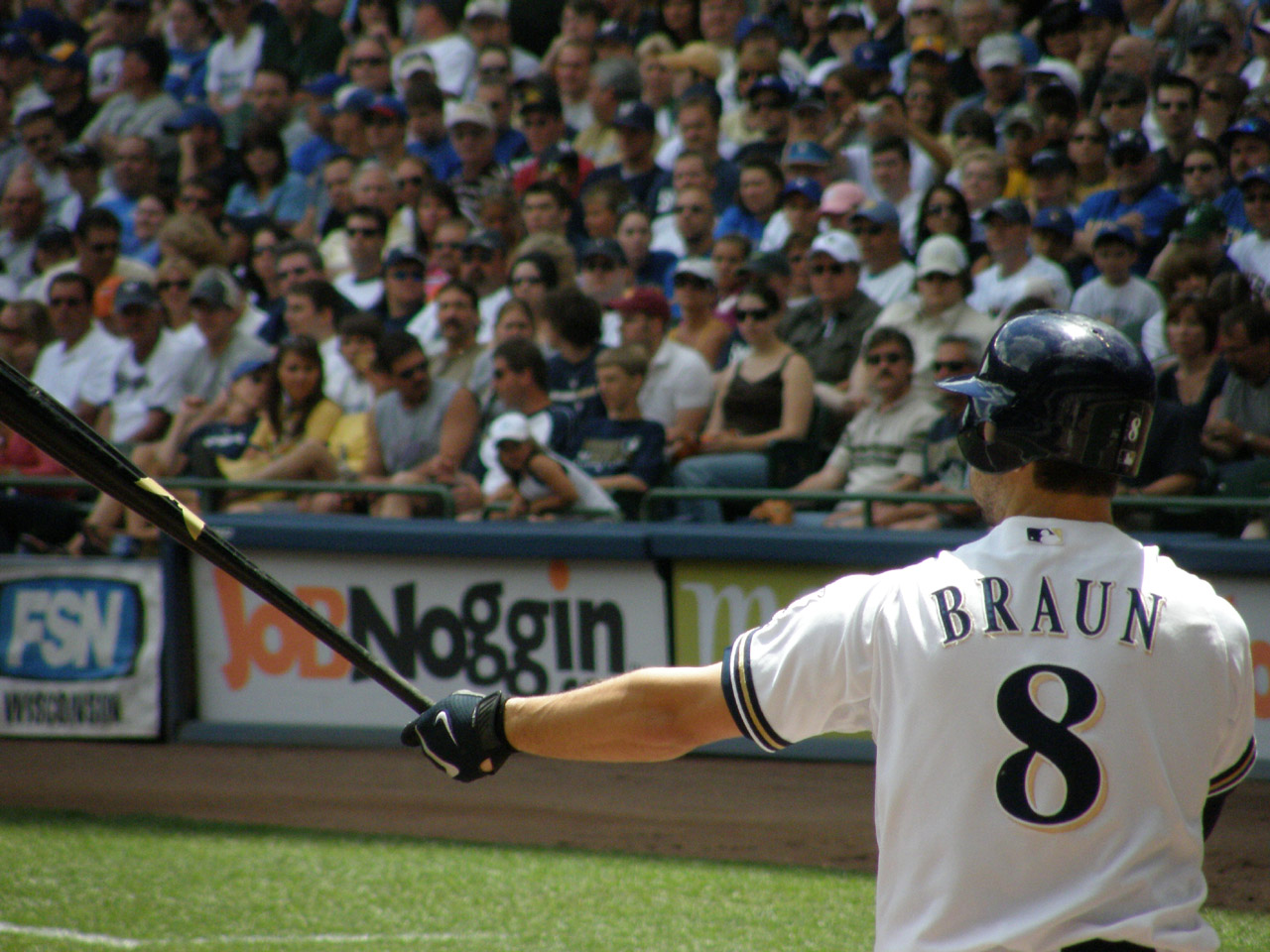
Ryan Braun

Leading the offense during the month of April was Mike Cameron, who led the team with a .333 batting average and tied for the team lead in home runs with 5. Ryan Braun and Rickie Weeks also hit 5 home runs in April. The month's best starting pitcher was newly acquired Braden Looper, who went 2–0 with a 2.45 ERA in April. Dave Bush came within five outs of a no-hitter in a 6–1 win over Philadelphia on April 23.

Trevor Hoffman returned from the disabled list and made his first Brewers appearance on April 27 in a non-save situation; he recorded his first save with the Brewers (and 555th overall) the following day. Backup catcher Mike Rivera, however, suffered a sprained ankle in the same game and was placed on the disabled list; rookie Carlos Corporán was called up from Nashville to replace him.

=== May ===
The Brewers opened May with a split of a four-game series against the Arizona Diamondbacks before sweeping the Pirates in a two-game series in Pittsburgh. In sweeping the Pirates, the Brewers extended their winning streak against Pittsburgh to 17 games dating back to May 20, 2008, the longest winning streak by one Major League Baseball team over another since 1970. The Brewers continued their winning ways in the following five series as well, splitting series against the Reds and Cubs, sweeping the Florida Marlins and the St. Louis Cardinals, and winning two out of three games in Houston. In a one-month period between April 21 and May 21, the Brewers did not lose a series and went 22–6, the best record in baseball over that period. The team struggled at the start of interleague play, however, as the Brewers were swept in their last scheduled visit to the Hubert H. Humphrey Metrodome by the rival Minnesota Twins. Returning home, the Brewers won a Memorial Day matinee against the Cardinals in a game where both Yovani Gallardo took a no-hit bid into the sixth inning and Cardinals starter Chris Carpenter had a perfect game into the seventh inning, but lost the next two games, leaving the Cardinals in sole possession of first place in the NL Central. The Brewers finished the month of May with a sweep of Cincinnati, giving the team an 18–10 record for the month.

Injuries and ineffective play by several bench players caused the Brewers to make several roster moves during the month of May. Mike Rivera returned from the disabled list on May 14 as Carlos Corporán was returned to the minors; Corporan appeared in only one game, where he caught the last two innings of a 15–3 blowout of the Cincinnati Reds on May 6 and singled off of regular Cincinnati shortstop Paul Janish in his only at-bat. The team suffered a significant setback on May 18 when starting second baseman Rickie Weeks suffered an injury to his left wrist, ending his 2009 season. For the time being, Craig Counsell and Casey McGehee are expected to replace Weeks in the lineup; Hernán Iribarren was called up from Nashville following the injury, but was returned to Nashville after only one series. Brad Nelson, who went hitless in 21 at-bats, declined a demotion to the minor leagues and became a free agent on May 15; top third base prospect Mat Gamel was called up to replace Nelson on the roster. On May 21, the Brewers traded Triple-A outfielder Tony Gwynn Jr. to the San Diego Padres in exchange for outfielder Jody Gerut; Chris Duffy was demoted to Nashville to make room on the roster for Gerut. Finally, on May 21 the team called up outfielder Frank Catalanotto, who had been signed to a minor league contract by the team earlier in the month.

=== June ===
The Brewers opened June on a sour note, dropping three out of four games to the Florida Marlins at Land Shark Stadium, but rebounded in the next series and won two out of three against the Atlanta Braves. Following a poor outing on June 1 in which he failed to retire any of the six batters he faced, Jorge Julio was released; Mike Burns was called up to take Julio's spot in the bullpen. In 15 appearances for the Brewers, Julio went 1–1 with a 7.79 ERA in 17 1/3 innings. The Brewers returned to Miller Park on June 9 but suffered a 1–5 homestand in which the team was swept by Colorado and lost two out of three against the Chicago White Sox. After giving up 6 runs in 1 1/3 innings in the second game of the White Sox series, Manny Parra was demoted to Triple-A Nashville; in 13 appearances through June 13, Parra went 3–8 with a 7.52 ERA. In the third game of the series, Trevor Hoffman finally gave up his first run of the season in what was then a tie game; Hoffman had pitched 18 2/3 innings in 2009 without giving up a run.

The Brewers returned to interleague play in Cleveland, where they swept the Cleveland Indians in a high-scoring series that included a six-run rally in the eighth inning on June 15, capped by Prince Fielder's first career grand slam, and an 11-inning win on June 17 that mooted a four-run comeback by the Indians in the ninth inning, giving Hoffman his first blown save of the season. The team's interleague woes returned for the remaining two interleague series, however, as the Brewers were swept in Detroit and dropped two of three against the Twins at Miller Park. The Twins series included the first start by a Brewers pitcher not in the opening day rotation, as Mike Burns made his first career start, replacing the injured Dave Bush. Milwaukee's fortunes improved with a return to National League play, as the team closed out June with series wins at home against San Francisco and the New York Mets. On June 27, Seth McClung made his first start of the year as Manny Parra's replacement in the pitching rotation (due to off days, a fifth starter had not been needed since Parra's June 13 demotion). On June 30, Burns collected his first career win in a game which also included Casey McGehee's first career grand slam. The Brewers ended June with a 12–15 record for the month, but nonetheless held a one-game lead over the St. Louis Cardinals for the division lead.

=== July ===
After opening July with a 1–0 loss to the Mets, the Brewers traveled to Wrigley Field for the first time in 2009, losing three of four games to the Cubs over the Fourth of July weekend. The team fared little better upon returning to Miller Park, dropping series against the St. Louis Cardinals and the Los Angeles Dodgers. Manny Parra returned to the majors on July 9 and pitched seven shutout innings, but received a no-decision after the Cardinals scored five runs off the Milwaukee bullpen in the eighth inning.

Three Brewers players participated in the 2009 MLB All-Star Game held July 14 in St. Louis, Missouri. Ryan Braun received 4,138,599 votes in fan balloting, the most received by any National League outfielder, and started his second consecutive All-Star Game. Prince Fielder also made his second All-Star appearance when he was selected as a reserve player by National League team manager Charlie Manuel. Fielder was also invited to the 2009 Home Run Derby, which he ultimately won with 17 home runs in the first two rounds and six home runs in the final round, beating Nelson Cruz of the Texas Rangers. Finally, Trevor Hoffman made his seventh All-Star appearance as a replacement for injured Dodgers closer Jonathan Broxton.

Following the All-Star Break the Brewers went on the road, splitting a four-game series against the Cincinnati Reds before losing two of three against the Pittsburgh Pirates. The Pirates win on July 20 snapped the Brewers 17-game winning streak against Pittsburgh in a game marred by a disputed beanball thrown at Pirates pitcher Jeff Karstens, reportedly in retribution for an incident in April where Karstens hit Ryan Braun with a pitch, that caused both benches to empty during the eighth inning. On July 19, second baseman Felipe López was acquired from the Arizona Diamondbacks for minor league players Cole Gillespie and Roque Mercedes; the acquisition of Lopez was expected to fill the hole at second and at the top of the lineup left by Rickie Weeks' May injury.

Milwaukee's July struggles continued at home, as the team lost a series against Atlanta before splitting a four-game series against the Washington Nationals, who entered the series with a Major League-worst 30–68 record. Tim Dillard was called up from the minor leagues to replace the struggling Mike Burns, and Carlos Villanueva made his first start of the season in a July 28 loss to the Nationals. Villanueva was a somewhat surprising choice for the assignment; though he had starting experience in 2008, Villanueva had struggled out of the bullpen in 2009 with a 2–7 record and 6.19 ERA. Following the series against the Nationals, the Brewers were forced to make more roster moves as Jeff Suppan was placed on the disabled list with a strained left oblique and third baseman Bill Hall was optioned to Triple-A Nashville at his own request to work on his hitting; Hall had struggled with a .201 batting average in 199 at-bats in 2009. Shortly before the July 31 trading deadline, former Brewer Claudio Vargas was acquired from the Los Angeles Dodgers in return for minor league infielder Vinny Rottino in an attempt to shore up the pitching staff.

=== Season standings ===
NL Central
Team	W	L	Pct.	GB	Home	Road
St. Louis Cardinals	91	71	.562	—	46‍–‍35	45‍–‍36
Chicago Cubs	83	78	.516	7½	46‍–‍34	37‍–‍44
Milwaukee Brewers	80	82	.494	11	40‍–‍41	40‍–‍41
Cincinnati Reds	78	84	.481	13	40‍–‍41	38‍–‍43
Houston Astros	74	88	.457	17	44‍–‍37	30‍–‍51
Pittsburgh Pirates	62	99	.385	28½	40‍–‍41	22‍–‍58

=== Record vs. opponents ===
2009 National League record Source: MLB Standings Grid – 2009
Team	AZ	ATL	CHC	CIN	COL	FLA	HOU	LAD	MIL	NYM	PHI	PIT	SD	SF	STL	WAS	AL
Arizona	–	3–4	4–2	1–5	7–11	5–3	5–4	7–11	2–5	5–2	1–5	6–1	11–7	5–13	2–4	1–5	5–10
Atlanta	4–3	–	4–2	3–6	4–4	8–10	3–3	4–3	3–3	13–5	10–8	3–4	3–3	3–4	4–2	10–8	7–8
Chicago	2–4	2–4	–	10–5	2–4	4–3	11–6	3–5	10–7	3–3	1–5	10–4	4–5	4–2	6–10	5–2	6–9
Cincinnati	5–1	6–3	5–10	–	0–7	3–3	12–4	1–5	8–7	2–4	2–5	13–5	1–6	3–3	8–8	3–4	6–9
Colorado	11–7	4–4	4–2	7–0	–	2–4	2–5	4–14	6–0	3–4	2–4	6–3	10–8	8–10	6–1	6–0	11–4
Florida	3–5	10–8	3–4	3–3	4–2	–	4–3	3–3	3–4	11–7	9–9	2–4	4–2	3–4	3–3	12–6	10–8
Houston	4–5	3–3	6–11	4–12	5–2	3–4	–	4–3	5–10	1–5	6–2	10–5	6–1	2–4	6–9	3–3	6–9
Los Angeles	11–7	3–4	5–3	5–1	14–4	3–3	3–4	–	3–3	5–1	4–3	4–3	10–8	11–7	2–5	3–2	9–9
Milwaukee	5–2	3–3	7–10	7–8	0–6	4–3	10–5	3–3	–	3–3	4–3	9–5	2–4	4–5	9–9	5–3	5–10
New York	2–5	5–13	3–3	4–2	4–3	7–11	5–1	1–5	3–3	–	6–12	4–3	2–5	5–3	4–5	10–8	5–10
Philadelphia	5–1	8–10	5–1	5–2	4–2	9–9	2–6	3–4	3–4	12–6	–	4–2	5–2	3–4	4–1	15–3	6–12
Pittsburgh	1–6	4–3	4–10	5–13	3–6	4–2	5–10	3–4	5–9	3–4	2–4	–	3–4	2–4	5–10	5–3	8–7
San Diego	7–11	3–3	5–4	6–1	8–10	2–4	1–6	8–10	4–2	5–2	2–5	4–3	–	10–8	1–6	4–2	5–10
San Francisco	13–5	4–3	2–4	3–3	10–8	4–3	4–2	7–11	5–4	3–5	4–3	4–2	8–10	–	4–3	4–2	9–6
St. Louis	4–2	2–4	10–6	8–8	1–6	3–3	9–6	5–2	9–9	5–4	1–4	10–5	6–1	3–4	–	6–1	9–6
Washington	5–1	8–10	2–5	4–3	0–6	6–12	3–3	2–3	3–5	8–10	3–15	3–5	2–4	2–4	1–6	–	7–11

=== Game log ===
2009 game log
April (12–10)

#	Date	Opponent	Score	Win	Loss	Save	Attendance	Record
1	April 7	@ Giants	10–6	Martinez (1–0)	Suppan (0–1)		42,767	0–1
2	April 8	@ Giants	4–2	Gallardo (1–0)	Johnson (0–1)	Villanueva (1)	40,764	1–1
3	April 9	@ Giants	7–1	Cain (1–0)	Parra (0–1)		30,027	1–2
4	April 10	Cubs	4–3	Villanueva (1–0)	Gregg (0–1)		45,455	2–2
5	April 11	Cubs	6–5	Heilman (1–0)	Villanueva (1–1)	Mármol (1)	43,768	2–3
6	April 12	Cubs	8–5	Dempster (1–0)	Suppan (0–2)		40,168	2–4
7	April 13	Reds	7–6	Vólquez (1–1)	Gallardo (1–1)	Cordero (2)	25,016	2–5
8	April 14	Reds	6–1	Arroyo (2–0)	Parra (0–2)		27,441	2–6
9	April 15	Reds	9–3	Looper (1–0)	Owings (0–1)		30,349	3–6
10	April 17	@ Mets	5–4	Putz (1–0)	McClung (0–1)		36,436	3–7
11	April 18	@ Mets	1–0	Santana (2–1)	Villanueva (1–2)	Rodríguez (3)	36,312	3–8
12	April 19	@ Mets	4–2	Suppan (1–2)	Figueroa (0–1)	Coffey (1)	36,124	4–8
13	April 21	@ Phillies	11–4	Moyer (2–1)	Parra (0–3)		40,605	4–9
14	April 22	@ Phillies	3–1	Looper (2–0)	Blanton (0–2)	Coffey (2)	32,759	5–9
15	April 23	@ Phillies	6–1	Bush (1–0)	Hamels (0–2)		36,395	6–9
16	April 24	@ Astros	5–2	Gallardo (2–1)	Paulino (0–1)		25,316	7–9
17	April 25	@ Astros	9–8 (11)	DiFelice (1–0)	Geary (0–3)		31,355	8–9
18	April 26	@ Astros	3–2	Ortiz (2–0)	Parra (0–4)	Valverde (2)	27,690	8–10
19	April 27	Pirates	10–5	Coffey (1–0)	Yates (0–1)		32,198	9–10
20	April 28	Pirates	6–5	Julio (1–0)	Chavez (0–1)	Hoffman (1)	26,594	10–10
21	April 29	Pirates	1–0	Gallardo (3–1)	Snell (1–3)	Villanueva (2)	29,791	11–10
22	April 30	Diamondbacks	4–1	DiFelice (2–0)	Gordon (0–1)	Hoffman (2)	26,464	12–10

May (18–10)

#	Date	Opponent	Score	Win	Loss	Save	Attendance	Record
23	May 1	Diamondbacks	5–2	Peña (3–0)	Villanueva (1–3)	Qualls (5)	42,810	12–11
24	May 2	Diamondbacks	4–1	Haren (3–3)	Looper (2–1)	Qualls (6)	42,422	12–12
25	May 3	Diamondbacks	4–3	Stetter (1–0)	Gutiérrez (1–2)	Hoffman (3)	44,727	13–12
26	May 4	@ Pirates	7–4	DiFelice (3–0)	Capps (0–2)	Hoffman (4)	8,482	14–12
27	May 5	@ Pirates	8–5	Suppan (2–2)	Snell (1–4)	Villanueva (3)	9,775	15–12
28	May 6	@ Reds	15–3	Parra (1–4)	Arroyo (4–2)		10,982	16–12
29	May 7	@ Reds	6–5	Owings (2–3)	Looper (2–2)	Cordero (8)	14,724	16–13
30	May 8	Cubs	3–2	Stetter (2–0)	Heilman (2–2)	Hoffman (5)	42,025	17–13
31	May 9	Cubs	12–6	Gallardo (4–1)	Dempster (2–2)		44,428	18–13
32	May 10	Cubs	4–2	Marshall (1–2)	Suppan (2–3)	Gregg (6)	41,646	18–14
33	May 12	Marlins	6–3	Parra (2–4)	Koronka (0–1)	Hoffman (6)	29,331	19–14
34	May 13	Marlins	8–6	Looper (3–2)	Nolasco (2–4)	Hoffman (7)	32,825	20–14
35	May 14	Marlins	5–3	Bush (2–0)	Badenhop (2–2)	Hoffman (8)	35,658	21–14
	May 15	@ Cardinals	Postponed (rain) Rescheduled for May 18					
36	May 16	@ Cardinals	1–0	Suppan (3–3)	Wainwright (3–2)	Hoffman (9)	43,382	22–14
37	May 17	@ Cardinals	8–2	Parra (3–4)	Wellemeyer (3–4)		43,042	23–14
38	May 18	@ Cardinals	8–4	Looper (4–2)	Lohse (3–3)		39,136	24–14
39	May 19	@ Astros	4–2	Bush (3–0)	Ortiz (2–2)	Hoffman (10)	29,343	25–14
40	May 20	@ Astros	6–4	Rodríguez (5–2)	Gallardo (4–2)	Sampson (2)	27,160	25–15
41	May 21	@ Astros	4–3	McClung (1–1)	Fulchino (0–1)	Hoffman (11)	25,037	26–15
42	May 22	@ Twins	11–3	Slowey (6–1)	Parra (3–5)		30,297	26–16
43	May 23	@ Twins	6–2	Swarzak (1–0)	Looper (4–3)		40,547	26–17
44	May 24	@ Twins	6–3	Baker (2–5)	Bush (3–1)		38,959	26–18
45	May 25	Cardinals	1–0 (10)	Villanueva (2–3)	McClellan (2–2)		43,032	27–18
46	May 26	Cardinals	8–1	Wainwright (5–2)	Suppan (3–4)		37,404	27–19
47	May 27	Cardinals	3–2	Wellemeyer (5–4)	Parra (3–6)	Franklin (12)	40,226	27–20
48	May 29	Reds	3–2	Looper (5–3)	Cueto (4–3)	Hoffman (12)	42,186	28–20
49	May 30	Reds	9–5	McClung (2–1)	Harang (5–5)		44,172	29–20
50	May 31	Reds	5–2	Gallardo (5–2)	Owings (3–6)	Hoffman (13)	44,594	30–20

June (12–15)

#	Date	Opponent	Score	Win	Loss	Save	Attendance	Record
51	June 1	@ Marlins	7–4	Martínez (1–0)	Julio (1–1)	Lindstrom (10)	10,509	30–21
52	June 2	@ Marlins	10–3	Badenhop (4–2)	Parra (3–7)		10,831	30–22
53	June 3	@ Marlins	9–6	McClung (3–1)	West (0–1)	Hoffman (14)	13,012	31–22
54	June 4	@ Marlins	4–3	Johnson (5–1)	Bush (3–2)	Lindstrom (11)	11,623	31–23
55	June 5	@ Braves	4–0	Gallardo (6–2)	Jurrjens (5–3)		23,327	32–23
56	June 6	@ Braves	3–0	Suppan (4–4)	Vázquez (4–5)	Hoffman (15)	32,721	33–23
57	June 7	@ Braves	8–7	O'Flaherty (1–0)	Villanueva (2–4)	González (8)	33,428	33–24
58	June 9	Rockies	3–2	Hammel (3–3)	Coffey (1–1)	Street (10)	32,464	33–25
59	June 10	Rockies	4–2	de la Rosa (2–6)	Bush (3–3)	Street (11)	34,823	33–26
60	June 11	Rockies	5–4	Cook (5–3)	Gallardo (6–3)	Street (12)	35,467	33–27
61	June 12	White Sox	7–2	Suppan (5–4)	Dotel (1–2)		41,811	34–27
62	June 13	White Sox	7–1	Contreras (2–5)	Parra (3–8)		44,100	34–28
63	June 14	White Sox	5–4	Thornton (4–1)	Hoffman (0–1)	Jenks (14)	41,586	34–29
64	June 15	@ Indians	14–12	Coffey (2–1)	Pérez (1–2)	Hoffman (16)	25,415	35–29
65	June 16	@ Indians	7–5	Gallardo (7–3)	Sowers (1–4)		22,986	36–29
66	June 17	@ Indians	9–8 (11)	DiFelice (4–0)	Aquino (1–2)	Stetter (1)	15,269	37–29
67	June 19	@ Tigers	4–10 (7)	Miner (4–1)	Looper (5–4)		34,112	37–30
68	June 20	@ Tigers	5–9	Figaro (1–0)	Bush (3–4)		39,156	37–31
69	June 21	@ Tigers	2–3	Verlander (8–3)	Gallardo (7–4)	Rodney (14)	41,163	37–32
70	June 23	Twins	7–3	Liriano (3–8)	Suppan (5–5)		42,008	37–33
71	June 24	Twins	4–3	Coffey (3–1)	Blackburn (6–3)	Hoffman (17)	34,480	38–33
72	June 25	Twins	6–4	Baker (5–6)	Burns (0–1)	Nathan (17)	40,524	38–34
73	June 26	Giants	5–1	Gallardo (8–4)	Cain (9–2)		37,345	39–34
74	June 27	Giants	7–6	Hoffman (1–1)	Wilson (2–4)		42,065	40–34
75	June 28	Giants	7–0	Sadowski (1–0)	Suppan (5–6)		43,391	40–35
76	June 29	Mets	10–6	Looper (6–4)	Nieve (3–1)	Hoffman (18)	39,872	41–35
77	June 30	Mets	6–3	Burns (1–1)	Santana (9–6)		39,872	42–35

July (9–16)

#	Date	Opponent	Score	Win	Loss	Save	Attendance	Record
78	July 1	Mets	1–0	Pelfrey (6–3)	Gallardo (8–5)	Rodríguez (21)	35,409	42–36
79	July 2	@ Cubs	9–5	Dempster (5–5)	McClung (3–2)		40,545	42–37
80	July 3	@ Cubs	2–1	Gregg (3–2)	DiFelice (4–1)		41,204	42–38
81	July 4	@ Cubs	11–2	Looper (7–4)	Harden (5–5)		40,088	43–38
82	July 5	@ Cubs	8–2	Lilly (8–6)	Burns (1–2)		40,369	43–39
83	July 7	Cardinals	5–0	Wainwright (9–5)	Gallardo (8–6)		36,557	43–40
84	July 8	Cardinals	5–4	Coffey (4–1)	Motte (3–3)	Hoffman (19)	33,655	44–40
85	July 9	Cardinals	5–1	Piñeiro (7–9)	Villanueva (2–5)		40,357	44–41
86	July 10	Dodgers	12–8	Troncoso (3–0)	Villanueva (2–6)		41,811	44–42
87	July 11	Dodgers	6–3	Burns (2–2)	Weaver (5–3)	Hoffman (20)	43,466	45–42
88	July 12	Dodgers	7–4	Kershaw (7–5)	Gallardo (8–7)	Troncoso (5)	42,241	45–43
89	July 16	@ Reds	9–6	Looper (8–4)	Bailey (1–1)	Hoffman (21)	23,579	46–43
90	July 17	@ Reds	4–0	Arroyo (10–8)	Suppan (5–7)		25,687	46–44
91	July 18	@ Reds	5–1	Parra (4–8)	Harang (5–10)		40,524	47–44
92	July 19	@ Reds	5–3	Weathers (2–2)	McClung (3–3)	Cordero (22)	25,924	47–45
93	July 20	@ Pirates	8–5	Ohlendorf (8–7)	Burns (2–3)		11,471	47–46
94	July 21	@ Pirates	2–0	Looper (9–4)	Vasquez (1–4)	Hoffman (22)	16,184	48–46
95	July 22	@ Pirates	8–7	Capps (2–5)	Stetter (2–1)		21,186	48–47
96	July 24	Braves	9–4	Vázquez (8–7)	Villanueva (2–7)		41,491	48–48
97	July 25	Braves	4–0	Gallardo (9–7)	Hanson (5–1)		43,565	49–48
98	July 26	Braves	10–2	Lowe (10–7)	Looper (9–5)		43,471	49–49
99	July 27	Nationals	14–6	Bergmann (1–1)	Suppan (5–8)		37,311	49–50
100	July 28	Nationals	8–3	Balester (1–1)	Villanueva (2–8)		36,502	49–51
101	July 29	Nationals	7–5	Parra (5–8)	Clippard (1–1)	Hoffman (23)	32,992	50–51
102	July 30	Nationals	7–3	Gallardo (10–7)	Martin (0–2)		39,890	51–51
103	July 31	@ Padres	11–7	Mujica (3–4)	Dillard (0–1)		32,588	51–52

August (13–14)

#	Date	Opponent	Score	Win	Loss	Save	Attendance	Record
104	August 1	@ Padres	4–2	Burke (3–3)	Burns (2–4)	Bell (26)	26,424	51–53
105	August 2	@ Padres	6–1	Stetter (3–3)	Correia (7–9)		23,696	52–53
106	August 3	@ Dodgers	6–5	Parra (6–8)	Kershaw (8–6)	Hoffman (24)	46,544	53–53
107	August 4	@ Dodgers	17–4	Kuroda (4–5)	Gallardo (10–8)		45,535	53–54
108	August 5	@ Dodgers	4–1	Looper (10–5)	Schmidt (2–2)	Hoffman (25)	50,276	54–54
109	August 7	@ Astros	6–3	Norris (2–0)	Villanueva (2–9)	Valverde (14)	34,691	54–55
110	August 8	@ Astros	12–5	Parra (7–8)	Hampton (7–9)		35,216	55–55
111	August 9	@ Astros	2–0	Rodríguez (11–6)	Gallardo (10–9)	Valverde (15)	32,262	55–56
112	August 11	Padres	13–6	Richard (6–3)	Looper (10–6)		37,040	55–57
113	August 12	Padres	6–5	Correia (8–9)	Coffey (4–2)	Bell (29)	38,753	55–58
114	August 13	Padres	12–9	Parra (8–8)	Carrillo (0–1)	Hoffman (26)	39,683	56–58
115	August 14	Astros	11–2	Gallardo (11–9)	Rodríguez (11–7)		37,715	57–58
116	August 15	Astros	6–2	Burns (3–4)	Moehler (7–9)		42,952	58–58
117	August 16	Astros	8–5	Fulchino (5–4)	Weathers (3–4)	Valverde (16)	41,863	58–59
118	August 17	@ Pirates	9–5	Hart (4–2)	Villanueva (2–10)		12,478	58–60
119	August 18	@ Pirates	5–2	Ohlendorf (11–8)	Parra (8–9)		12,188	58–61
120	August 19	@ Pirates	3–1	Maholm (7–7)	Gallardo (11–10)	Capps (22)	12,630	58–62
121	August 21	@ Nationals	7–3	Looper (11–6)	Martin (2–3)		26,307	59–62
122	August 22	@ Nationals	11–9	Narveson (1–0)	Bergmann (2–2)	Hoffman (27)	19,374	60–62
123	August 23	@ Nationals	8–3	Stammen (4–6)	Parra (8–10)		21,484	60–63
124	August 24	@ Nationals	7–1	Gallardo (12–10)	Balester (1–4)		17,805	61–63
125	August 25	Reds	8–6	Herrera (2–4)	Coffey (4–3)		29,481	61–64
126	August 26	Reds	4–3	Herrera (3–4)	Burns (3–5)	Cordero (27)	35,084	61–65
127	August 27	Reds	8–5	Lehr (3–1)	Bush (3–5)	Cordero (28)	31,091	61–66
128	August 28	Pirates	8–6	Parra (9–10)	Duke (10–12)	Hoffman (28)	34,438	62–66
129	August 29	Pirates	7–3	Vargas (1–0)	Hart (4–4)		41,773	63–66
130	August 30	Pirates	4–1	Suppan (6–8)	Ohlendorf (11–9)	Hoffman (29)	41,157	64–66

September (13–15)

#	Date	Opponent	Score	Win	Loss	Save	Attendance	Record
131	September 1	@ Cardinals	7–6	Piñeiro (14–9)	Weathers (3–5)	Franklin (36)	40,119	64–67
132	September 2	@ Cardinals	10–3	Carpenter (15–3)	Bush (3–6)		40,214	64–68
133	September 3	@ Cardinals	4–3	Parra (10–10)	Smoltz (1–1)	Hoffman (30)	37,791	65–68
134	September 4	Giants	3–2	Medders (4–1)	Coffey (4–4)	Wilson (33)	37,511	65–69
135	September 5	Giants	3–2	Cain (13–4)	Gallardo (12–11)	Wilson (34)	30,254	65–70
136	September 6	Giants	2–1 (12)	Stetter (4–1)	Valdez (2–1)		36,590	66–70
137	September 7	Cardinals	3–0	Carpenter (16–3)	Bush (3–7)		35,360	66–71
138	September 8	Cardinals	3–4	Hawksworth (3–0)	Hoffman (1–2)	McClellan (3)	36,172	66–72
139	September 9	Cardinals	5–1	Wainwright (18–7)	Suppan (6–9)		26,559	66–73
140	September 11	@ Diamondbacks	6–3	Looper (12–6)	Davis (7–13)	Hoffman (31)	19,945	67–73
141	September 12	@ Diamondbacks	9–2	Bush (4–7)	Mulvey (0–1)		31,369	68–73
142	September 13	@ Diamondbacks	5–3	Villanueva (3–10)	Schlereth (0–4)	Hoffman (32)	21,453	69–73
143	September 14	@ Cubs	2–0	Dempster (10–8)	Suppan (6–10)	Mármol (13)	38,725	69–74
144	September 15	@ Cubs	13–7	Heilman (3–3)	Gallardo (12–12)		38,986	69–75
145	September 16	@ Cubs	9–5	Looper (13–6)	Harden (9–9)		38,084	70–75
146	September 17	@ Cubs	7–4	Bush (5–7)	Wells (10–9)	Hoffman (33)	39,158	71–75
147	September 18	Astros	3–2	Weathers (4–5)	Wright (3–4)	Hoffman (34)	39,057	72–75
148	September 19	Astros	7–2	Suppan (7–10)	Byrdak (1–2)		36,399	73–75
149	September 20	Astros	6–0	Gallardo (13–12)	Paulino (2–10)		30,024	74–75
150	September 21	Cubs	10–2	Gorzelanny (6–2)	Looper (13–7)		34,192	74–76
151	September 22	Cubs	7–2	Wells (11–9)	Bush (5–8)		34,316	74–77
152	September 23	Cubs	3–2	Narveson (2–0)	Samardzija (1–3)	Hoffman (35)	32,340	75–77
153	September 24	Phillies	9–4	Happ (11–4)	Suppan (7–11)		37,678	75–78
154	September 25	Phillies	8–4	Parra (11–10)	Lee (14–12)	Hoffman (36)	33,428	76–78
155	September 26	Phillies	7–5	Hoffman (2–2)	Walker (2–1)		40,141	77–78
156	September 27	Phillies	6–5	Blanton (12–7)	Bush (5–9)	Madson (9)	37,197	77–79
157	September 29	@ Rockies	7–5 (11)	Belisle (3–1)	Weathers (4–6)		39,087	77–80
158	September 30	@ Rockies	10–6	Hammel (10–8)	Suppan (7–12)		41,465	77–81

October (3–1)

#	Date	Opponent	Score	Win	Loss	Save	Attendance	Record
159	October 1	@ Rockies	9–2	Cook (11–6)	Parra (11–11)		38,098	77–82
160	October 2	@ Cardinals	12–6	Looper (14–7)	McClellan (4–4)		44,331	78–82
161	October 3	@ Cardinals	5–4	Villanueva (4–10)	Lohse (6–10)	Hoffman (37)	43,977	79–82
162	October 4	@ Cardinals	9–7 (10)	Hoffman (3–2)	Wellemeyer (7–10)	Axford (1)	43,464	80–82

=== Roster ===
2009 Milwaukee Brewers
Roster
Pitchers: 59 John Axford; 47 Mike Burns; 31 Dave Bush; 62 Josh Butler; 60 Todd Coffey; 58 Jesús Colomé; 45 Mark DiFelice; 48 Tim Dillard; 49 Yovani Gallardo; 51 Trevor Hoffman; 50 Jorge Julio; 41 Braden Looper; 73 Seth McClung; 38 Chris Narveson; 26 Manny Parra; 54 David Riske; 52 Chris Smith; 57 Mitch Stetter; 37 Jeff Suppan; 43 R. J. Swindle; 50 Claudio Vargas; 12 Carlos Villanueva; 20 David Weathers	Catchers: 32 Carlos Corporán; 18 Jason Kendall; 11 Mike Rivera; Infielders: 30 Craig Counsell; 21 Alcides Escobar; 28 Prince Fielder; 24 Mat Gamel; 2 Bill Hall; 9 Hernán Iribarren; 3 Felipe López; 14 Casey McGehee; 27 Brad Nelson; 23 Rickie Weeks	Outfielders: 16 Jason Bourgeois; 8 Ryan Braun; 25 Mike Cameron; 27 Frank Catalanotto; 16 Chris Duffy; 22 Jody Gerut; 1 Corey Hart; 10 Corey Patterson	Manager: 40 Ken Macha; Coaches: 43 Chris Bosio (pitching); 35 Bill Castro (pitching); 36 Brad Fischer (third base); 53 Stan Kyles (Bullpen); 33 Willie Randolph (Bench); 6 Ed Sedar (first base); 29 Dale Sveum (hitting)

== Player stats ==
=== Batting ===
==== Starters by position ====
Note: Pos = Position; G = Games played; AB = At bats; H = Hits; Avg. = Batting average; HR = Home runs; RBI = Runs batted in

Pos	Player	G	AB	H	Avg.	HR	RBI
C	Jason Kendall	134	452	109	.241	2	43
1B	Prince Fielder	162	591	177	.299	46	141
2B	Felipe López	66	259	83	.320	3	32
SS	J.J. Hardy	115	414	95	.229	11	47
3B	Casey McGehee	116	355	107	.301	16	66
LF	Ryan Braun	158	635	203	.320	32	114
CF	Mike Cameron	149	544	136	.250	24	70
RF	Corey Hart	115	419	109	.260	12	48

Through October 4, 2009

==== Other batters ====
Note: G = Games played; AB = At bats; H = Hits; Avg. = Batting average; HR = Home runs; RBI = Runs batted in

Player	G	AB	H	Avg.	HR	RBI
Craig Counsell	130	404	115	.285	4	39
Bill Hall	76	214	43	.201	6	24
Jody Gerut	85	161	38	.236	5	21
Rickie Weeks	37	147	40	.272	9	24
Frank Catalanotto	77	144	40	.278	1	9
Mat Gamel	61	128	31	.242	5	20
Alcides Escobar	38	125	38	.304	1	11
Mike Rivera	41	114	26	.228	2	14
Jason Bourgeois	24	37	7	.189	1	3
Chris Duffy	19	32	4	.125	0	3
Brad Nelson	19	21	0	.000	0	0
Corey Patterson	11	14	1	.071	0	0
Hernan Iribarren	12	13	3	.231	0	1
Carlos Corporan	1	1	1	1.000	0	0

Through October 4, 2009

=== Pitching ===
==== Starting and other pitchers ====
Note: G = Games pitched; IP = Innings pitched; W = Wins; L = Losses; ERA = Earned run average; SO = Strikeouts; WHIP = Walks + hits per inning pitched

Player	G	IP	W	L	ERA	SO	WHIP
Braden Looper	34	194.2	14	7	5.22	100	1.49
Yovani Gallardo	26	185.2	13	12	3.73	204	1.31
Jeff Suppan	30	161.2	7	12	5.29	80	1.70
Manny Parra	27	140.0	11	11	6.36	116	1.83
Dave Bush	22	114.1	5	9	6.38	89	1.47
Mike Burns	15	51.2	3	5	5.75	39	1.49
Chris Narveson	21	47.0	2	0	3.83	46	1.30

Through October 4, 2009

==== Relief pitchers ====
Note: G = Games pitched; W = Wins; L = Losses; SV = Saves; IP = Innings pitched; ERA = Earned run average; SO = Strikeouts; WHIP = Walks + hits per inning pitched

Player	G	W	L	SV	IP	ERA	SO	WHIP
Trevor Hoffman	55	3	2	37	54.0	1.83	48	0.91
Todd Coffey	78	4	4	2	83.2	2.90	65	1.16
Mitch Stetter	71	4	1	1	45.0	3.60	44	1.42
Carlos Villanueva	64	4	10	3	96.0	5.34	83	1.43
Mark DiFelice	59	4	1	0	51.2	3.66	48	1.24
Seth McClung	41	3	3	0	62.0	4.94	40	1.63
Chris Smith	35	0	0	0	46.0	4.11	35	1.30
Claudio Vargas	28	1	0	0	30.1	1.78	20	0.96
David Weathers	25	1	3	0	24.0	4.88	10	1.54
Jorge Julio	15	1	1	0	17.1	7.79	13	1.73
John Axford	7	0	0	1	7.2	3.52	9	1.44
R.J. Swindle	6	0	0	0	6.2	16.20	8	2.40
Jesús Colomé	5	0	0	0	6.1	5.68	3	1.74
Josh Butler	3	0	0	0	4.0	9.00	3	3.25
Tim Dillard	2	0	1	0	4.1	12.46	1	2.77
David Riske	1	0	0	0	1.0	18.00	0	4.00

Through October 4, 2009

== Farm system ==
The Brewers' farm system consisted of seven minor league affiliates in 2009. The Brewers operated a Dominican Summer League team as a co-op with the Baltimore Orioles.

Level	Team	League	Manager
Triple-A	Nashville Sounds	Pacific Coast League	Don Money
Double-A	Huntsville Stars	Southern League	Bobby Miscik
Class A-Advanced	Brevard County Manatees	Florida State League	Mike Guerrero
Class A	Wisconsin Timber Rattlers	Midwest League	Jeff Isom
Rookie	Helena Brewers	Pioneer League	Rene Gonzales
Rookie	AZL Brewers	Arizona League	Tony Diggs
Rookie	DSL Orioles/Brewers	Dominican Summer League	—
