= Casey McGehee =

American baseball player (born 1982)

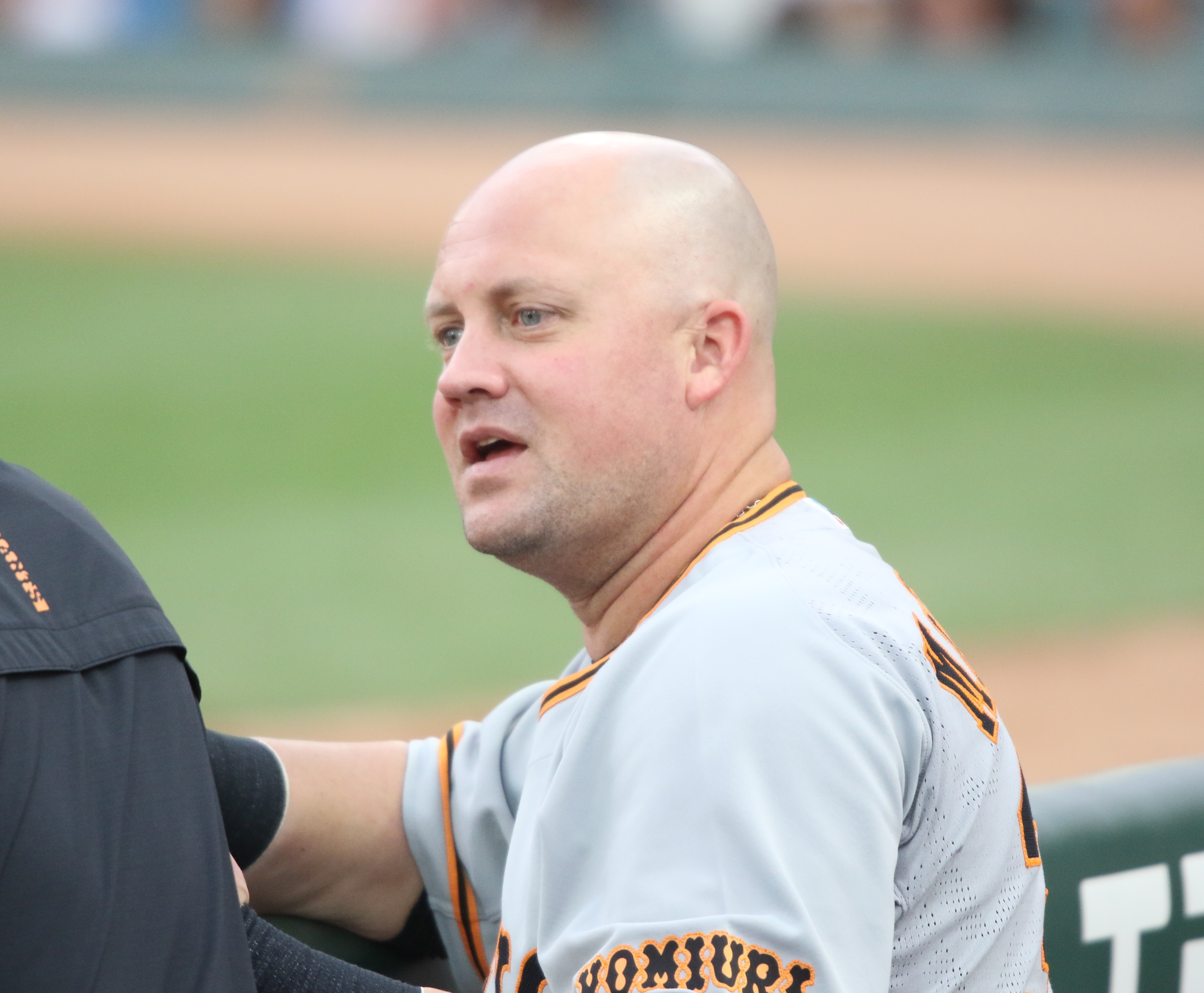
- McGehee with the Yomiuri Giants in 2018
- Third baseman
- Born: October 12, 1982 (age 44); Santa Cruz, California, U.S.
- Batted: Right Threw: Right

Professional debut
- MLB: September 2, 2008, for the Chicago Cubs
- NPB: March 29, 2013, for the Tohoku Rakuten Golden Eagles

Last appearance
- MLB: September 27, 2016, for the Detroit Tigers
- NPB: 2018, for the Yomiuri Giants

MLB statistics
- Batting average: .258
- Home runs: 67
- Runs batted in: 380

NPB statistics
- Batting average: .298
- Home runs: 67
- Runs batted in: 254
- Stats at Baseball Reference

Teams
- Chicago Cubs (2008); Milwaukee Brewers (2009–2011); Pittsburgh Pirates (2012); New York Yankees (2012); Tohoku Rakuten Golden Eagles (2013); Miami Marlins (2014); San Francisco Giants (2015); Miami Marlins (2015); Detroit Tigers (2016); Yomiuri Giants (2017–2018)

Career highlights and awards
- MLB: NL Comeback Player of the Year (2014); NPB: All-Star (2017); Japan Series champion (2013); Best Nine Award (2013)

Casey Michael McGehee (born October 12, 1982) is an American former professional baseball infielder. He played in Major League Baseball (MLB) for the Chicago Cubs, Milwaukee Brewers, Pittsburgh Pirates, New York Yankees, Miami Marlins, San Francisco Giants, and Detroit Tigers. He also played in Nippon Professional Baseball (NPB) for the Tohoku Rakuten Golden Eagles and Yomiuri Giants.

== Amateur career ==
Born and raised in Santa Cruz, California, McGehee graduated from Soquel High School in Soquel, California, where he competed in baseball and basketball. In baseball, McGehee was a four-year letter winner and was named County Player of the Year for his junior and senior seasons. However, he finished 2nd in the league in batting average to Harbor High star, Mike Urbani, brother of former St. Louis Cardinals pitcher Tom Urbani. His senior season he hit .489 with 10 home runs and did not strikeout once during the season. McGehee holds the SCCAL all-time hits record and was an AAU All-American for his junior and senior seasons. McGehee then attended California State University Fresno. At Fresno, McGehee played left field his freshman season before transitioning to third base as a sophomore. During his freshman season, McGehee was a Baseball America honorable mention freshman All-American. During his sophomore season, McGehee was co-MVP of the team, and after another excellent junior season, McGehee decided to leave Fresno to play in the MLB.

== Professional career ==
=== Chicago Cubs ===
McGehee was drafted by the Chicago Cubs in the tenth round of the 2003 Major League Baseball draft out of Fresno State. McGehee was a September call-up for the Cubs in 2008, making his major league debut on September 2. He went 0 for 1 in his first game.

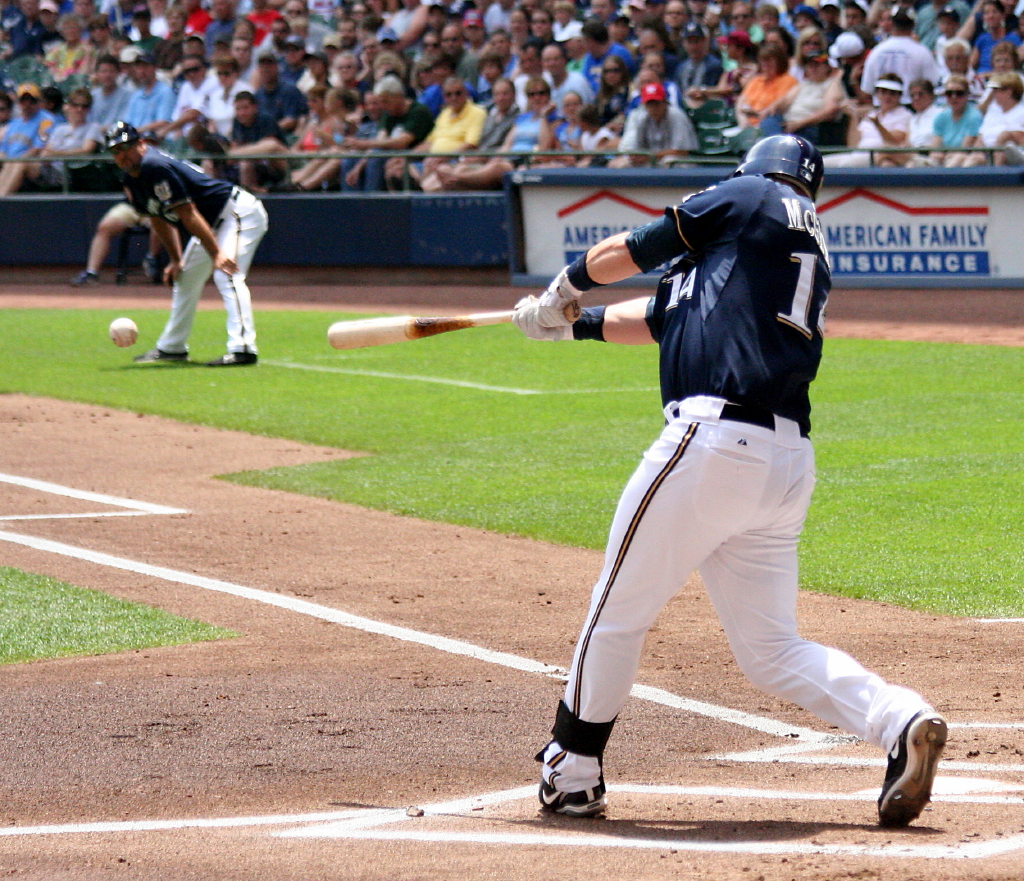
McGehee batting for the Milwaukee Brewers in 2009

=== Milwaukee Brewers ===
Following the season, he was claimed off of waivers by the Milwaukee Brewers, and added to their 40-man roster.

==== 2009 ====
On March 31, 2009, it was announced that he would be a reserve infielder for the Brewers in 2009. When Ryan Braun got injured, third baseman Bill Hall played at Braun's position in left field, while McGehee started at third base. When Rickie Weeks got injured, he made his first start at second base. With Bill Hall struggling at the plate, and Mat Gamel struggling on defense, he saw a lot of time at third base. He hit his first home run on June 14, 2009, off of Mark Buehrle of the Chicago White Sox; it was one of his two RBIs in the game. On June 29, 2009, he hit his first career grand slam off of New York Mets pitcher Brian Stokes, which came after he committed an error that led to two unearned runs. On July 4, McGehee had career highs of four hits and five RBIs against the Chicago Cubs. Although he came up short on the NL Rookie of the Year balloting for 2009, his solid season cemented him a starting job at third base for the Brewers in 2010.

==== 2010 ====
McGehee batted .285 with 23 home runs and a team-leading 104 RBIs in 157 games. On August 12, McGehee sets a team record with nine consecutive hits in going 4 for 4 in the Brewers' 8-4 win over the Arizona Diamondbacks. McGehee hit a home run, a double, and two singles, driving in four and scoring three runs to lead Milwaukee. He grounded out in his first at-bat the next day to end his streak. McGehee was voted the Brewers' Most Valuable Player. He edged out second baseman Rickie Weeks and outfielder Corey Hart for the award.

==== 2011 ====
In 2011, he batted .223 with 13 home runs, three of which came in the same game on August 3. All three were off of St. Louis Cardinals pitcher Edwin Jackson. He led all NL third basemen in errors, with 20.

=== Pittsburgh Pirates ===
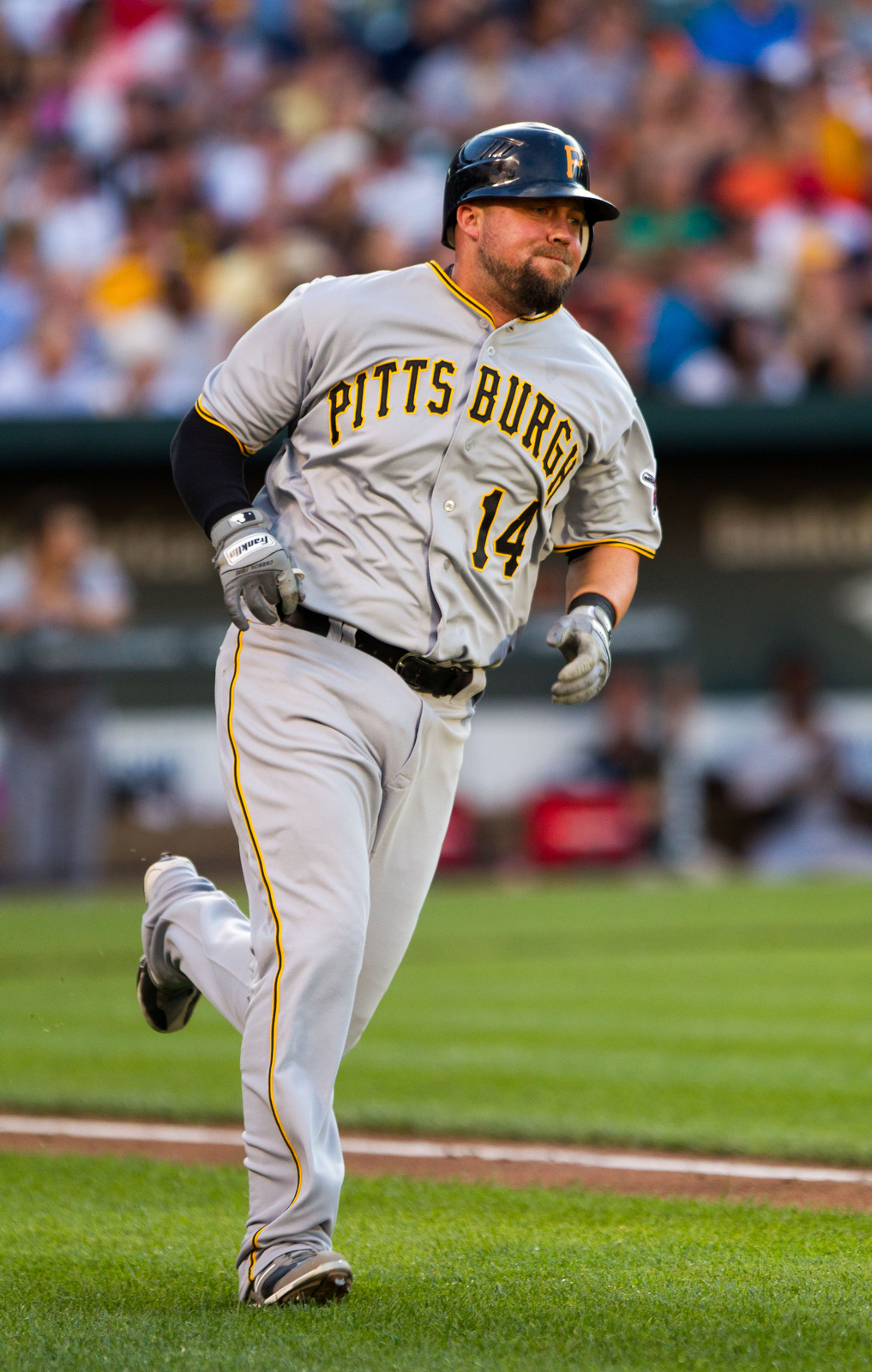
McGehee with the Pittsburgh Pirates in 2012

On December 12, 2011, hours after the Brewers agreed to a contract with Aramis Ramírez, McGehee was traded to the Pittsburgh Pirates for José Veras.

=== New York Yankees ===
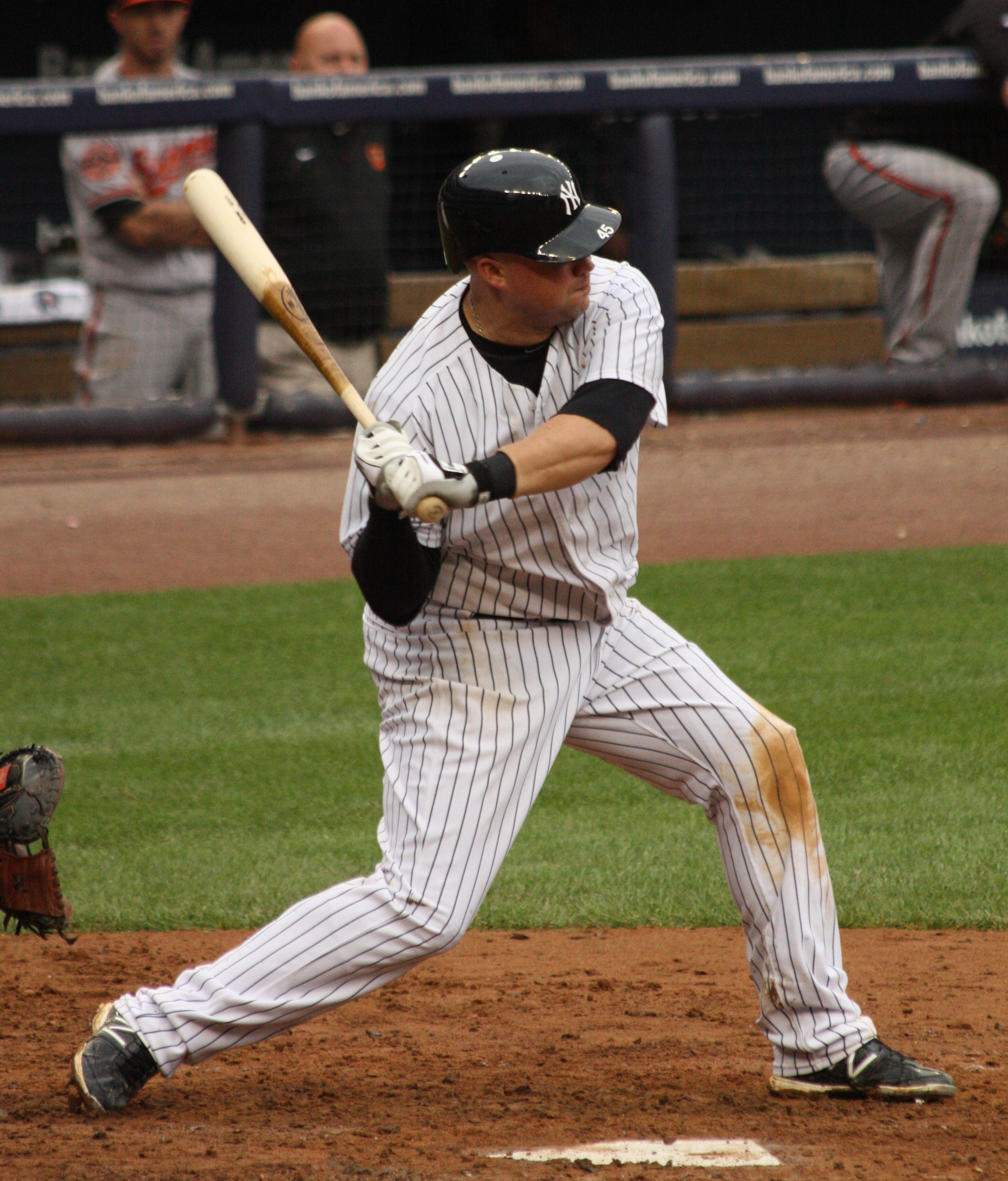
McGehee with the New York Yankees in 2012

On July 31, 2012, McGehee was traded to the New York Yankees for RHP Chad Qualls. The Yankees traded for 1B/3B McGehee after injuries to Alex Rodriguez and Mark Teixeira.

On August 28, 2012, McGehee was optioned to Class-A Charleston to make room on the 25-man roster for a recently acquired Steve Pearce. He was recalled when rosters expanded in September.

=== Tohoku Rakuten Golden Eagles ===
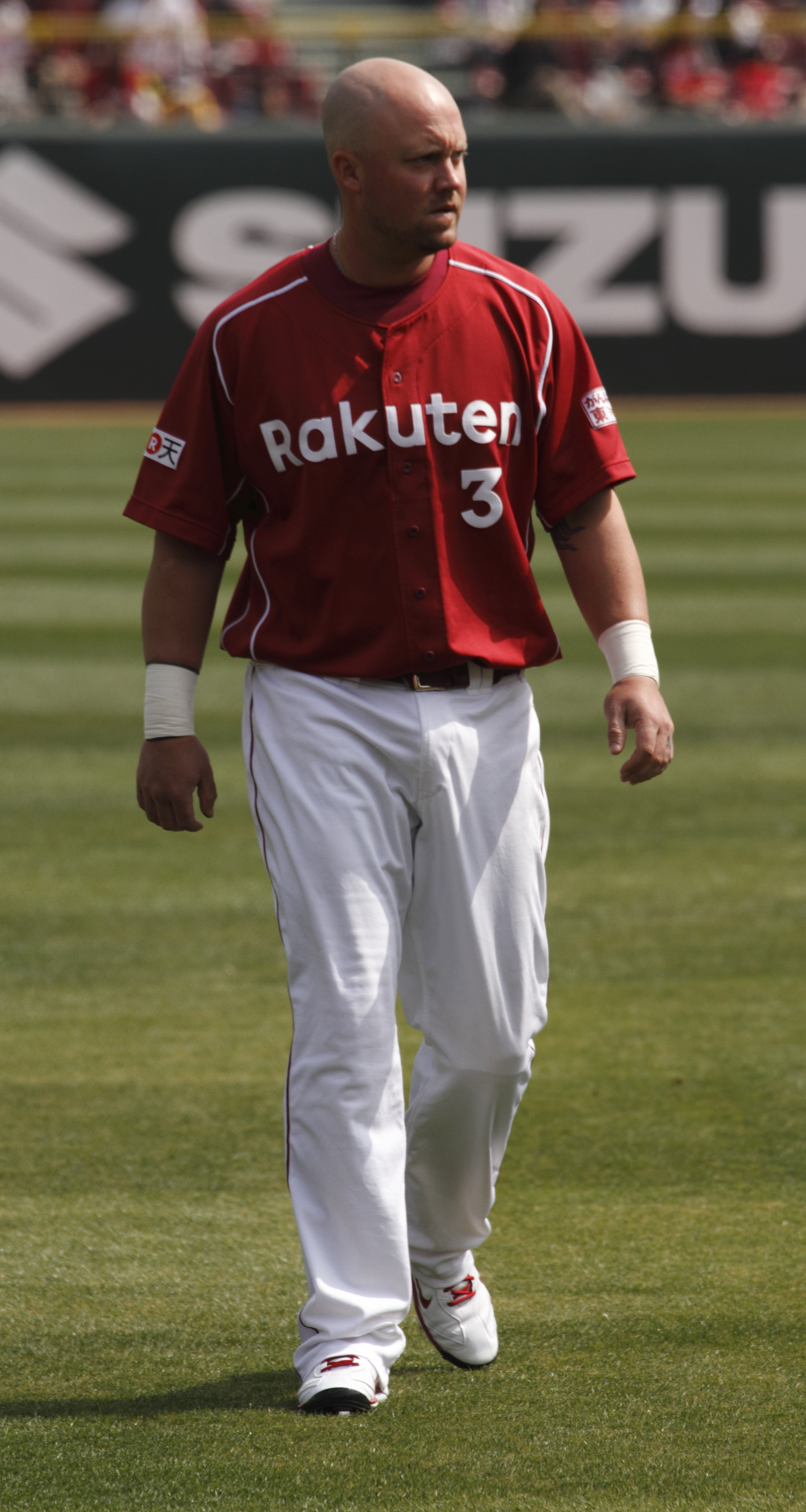
McGehee with the Tohoku Rakuten Golden Eagles

He signed a $1.5 million contract to play in Japan for the Tohoku Rakuten Golden Eagles on December 21, 2012. McGehee led the Golden Eagles to their 1st Japan Series title. Also leading the way were Japan Series MVP Manabu Mima, current Yankees star Masahiro Tanaka, and fellow former MLB outfielder Andruw Jones. In 144 games, mostly at third base, McGehee hit .292 with 28 home runs and 93 RBI.

=== Miami Marlins ===
McGehee's period in Japan paid off, and on December 18, 2013, McGehee signed a one-year, $1.1 million deal with the Miami Marlins to start at third base. McGehee hit his first Marlins home run on May 10, despite hitting .309 with 23 RBI in 36 games before. It was in Miami that Casey earned his nickname "Hits McGehee." In 160 games of 2014, McGehee grounded into an MLB-leading 31 double plays while batting .287 with 4 home runs and 76 RBI, winning the Major League Baseball Comeback Player of the Year Award for the National League.

=== San Francisco Giants ===
On December 19, 2014, McGehee was traded to the San Francisco Giants in exchange for minor league pitchers Kendry Flores and Luis Castillo. He began the 2015 season as the Giants starting third baseman but struggled and was designated for assignment on May 24, despite hitting a grand slam. On May 26, McGehee accepted an assignment to the Giants' Triple–A affiliate, the Sacramento River Cats, but was recalled by the Giants on June 5 after batting .357 (15-for-42) with two home runs and three doubles. After appearing in a total of 49 games for the Giants and batting .213 he was designated for assignment again on June 30.

=== Miami Marlins (second stint) ===
On July 10, 2015, the Miami Marlins signed McGehee to a one-year contract. In 60 games for the Marlins, McGehee slashed .182/.250/.245 with nine RBI. On November 2, he elected free agency.

=== Detroit Tigers ===
On February 23, 2016, the Detroit Tigers signed McGehee to a minor league contract. On March 28, 2016, McGehee was released by the Tigers. On March 30, the Tigers re-signed McGehee to a minor league contract. On June 18, 2016, the Tigers purchased McGehee's contract from the Triple–A Toledo Mud Hens. In early August 2016, McGehee was called up to the major leagues by the Tigers following an injury to Nick Castellanos. In 30 games for Detroit, McGehee batted .228/.260/.239 with 1 RBI.

=== Yomiuri Giants ===
On December 3, 2016, McGehee signed a one-year contract with the Yomiuri Giants that includes a club option for the 2018 season. McGehee played in 139 games for Yomiuri in 2017, slashing .315/.382/.514 with 18 home runs and 77 RBI. In 2018, McGehee posted a batting line of .285/.336/.467 with 21 home runs and 84 RBI in 132 games for the Giants. He became a free agent after the season.

== Coaching career ==
McGehee was named head coach of the Union University baseball team on June 30, 2022.

== Personal life ==
McGehee is married to wife, Sarah, and has two children. One child has Cerebral palsy. They met in Jackson, Tennessee where Sarah lived and McGehee played for the minor league West Tennessee Diamond Jaxx.
