= Brad Nelson (baseball) =

American baseball player (born 1982)

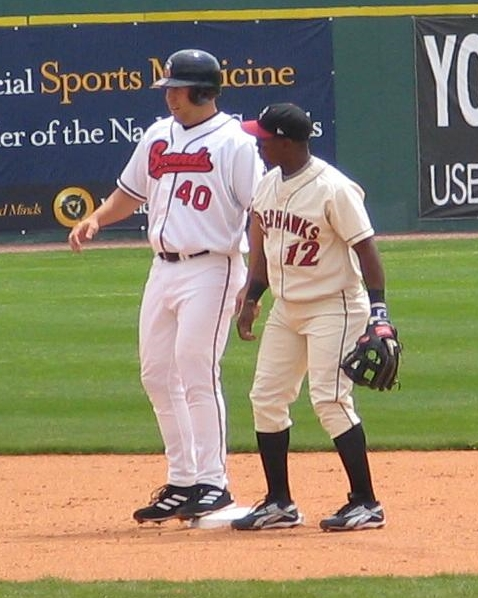
- Nelson being held at second base by Esteban Germán
- First baseman / Right fielder
- Born: December 23, 1982 (age 43); Algona, Iowa, U.S.
- Batted: Left Threw: Right

MLB debut
- September 1, 2008, for the Milwaukee Brewers

Last appearance
- May 12, 2009, for the Milwaukee Brewers

MLB statistics
- Batting average: .071
- Home runs: 0
- Runs batted in: 0
- Stats at Baseball Reference

Teams
- Milwaukee Brewers (2008–2009)

Bradley John Nelson (born December 23, 1982) is an American former professional baseball player. He played primarily first base and outfield in Major League Baseball (MLB) for the Milwaukee Brewers.

== High school ==
Nelson played high school baseball at Bishop Garrigan High School in Algona, Iowa. He was a pitcher and utility infielder. He started varsity halfway through his eighth grade summer and led the team to the state championship game as a sophomore. The team he played on that season continues to hold the state records for most runs (523), home runs (90), and RBIs (461) in a season; Nelson himself holds the state records for most hits (83) and most RBIs (91) in a season.

== Professional career ==
=== Milwaukee Brewers ===
He was drafted by the Milwaukee Brewers in the fourth round of the 2001 Major League Baseball draft.

Nelson has played professionally for the Rookie Level Arizona League Brewers and Ogden Raptors, the Single-A Beloit Snappers and High Desert Mavericks, the Double-A Huntsville Stars, and the Triple-A Nashville Sounds. He was part of the 2005 Sounds team that won the Pacific Coast League championship.

He was selected to play in the 2002 Midwest League All-Star game in Lansing, Michigan, and the 2004 Southern League All-Star Game in Chattanooga, Tennessee. In both all-star appearances, he won the home run derby that was part of the All-Star festivities. He was also named the Milwaukee Brewers' 2002 Minor League Player of the Year, after leading all minor leaguers with 116 RBIs and 49 doubles at the age of 19.

In addition to his positive career statistics, Nelson also holds the Pacific Coast League record for most strikeouts in a single game, with seven strike-outs in 11 plate appearances in a 24-inning game (the longest game in PCL history) in which the Nashville Sounds played against the New Orleans Zephyrs on May 5 and 6, 2006.

For the 2008 season, he played with the Triple-A Nashville Sounds, but was called up to the Brewers on September 1; he made his major league debut that afternoon. On September 2, Nelson collected his first major league hit, a pinch-hit double in the 10th inning against Luis Ayala of the New York Mets. After a successful 2009 spring training, the Brewers kept Nelson on the 25-man roster to start the following year. However, after going hitless in 21 at-bats primarily as a pinch hitter to start the season, Nelson was outrighted to AAA, and replaced with infielder Mat Gamel, on May 14. Rather than report back to the Brewers' minor league system, Nelson opted for free agency the next day.

=== Seattle Mariners ===
After spending eight years in the Brewers organization, with 28 games at the major league level, Nelson signed a minor-league contract with the Seattle Mariners on May 19, 2009. After spending the rest of 2009 with the Mariners' top farm club, the Tacoma Rainiers, Nelson signed another minor-league deal with the Mariners on January 14, 2010, and was again invited to spring training with the club. Like in Milwaukee, a crowded first base caused the Mariners to cut Nelson on March 13, 2010, and send him to their minor league camp. He spent the entire 2010 season in Tacoma, and became a free agent on November 6, 2010.

=== Texas Rangers ===
Nelson played in the Texas Rangers organization in 2011 and 2012.

=== Chicago Cubs ===
He played in the Chicago Cubs organization in 2013.

=== Minnesota Twins ===
He signed a minor league deal with the Minnesota Twins in February 2014. He was released on July 19, 2014.
