= Corey Hart (baseball) =

American baseball player (born 1982)

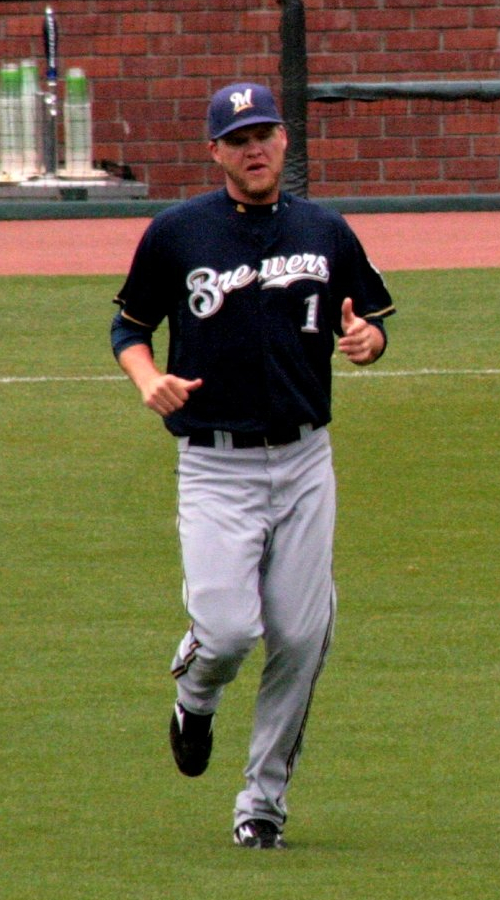
- Hart with the Milwaukee Brewers in 2008
- Right fielder
- Born: March 24, 1982 (age 44); Bowling Green, Kentucky, U.S.
- Batted: Right Threw: Right

MLB debut
- May 25, 2004, for the Milwaukee Brewers

Last MLB appearance
- June 21, 2015, for the Pittsburgh Pirates

MLB statistics
- Batting average: .271
- Home runs: 162
- Runs batted in: 538
- Stats at Baseball Reference

Teams
- Milwaukee Brewers (2004–2012); Seattle Mariners (2014); Pittsburgh Pirates (2015)

Career highlights and awards
- 2× All-Star (2008, 2010); Milwaukee Brewers Wall of Honor

Jon Corey Hart (born March 24, 1982) is an American former professional baseball right fielder. He played in Major League Baseball (MLB) for the Milwaukee Brewers from 2004 through 2013, the Seattle Mariners in 2014 and the Pittsburgh Pirates in 2015. Hart was a two-time MLB All-Star, and also participated in the MLB Home Run Derby.

== High school career ==
Hart played for the Greenwood High School Gators in Bowling Green, Kentucky. Hart also played basketball for four years for the Gators for coach Jason Couch and regularly played shortstop on the baseball team. Hart's jersey is retired by Greenwood and hangs from the rafters in the school's gymnasium. Hart was recruited to be college basketball at University of Alabama at Birmingham.

Hart played American Legion Baseball and was named the program's Graduate of the Year for 2011.

== Minor league career ==
The Milwaukee Brewers selected Hart in the 11th round of the 2000 MLB draft. He started his career that summer with the rookie level Ogden Raptors, primarily playing at first base. He moved up to the Single-A High Desert Mavericks and then the Double-A Huntsville Stars by the 2002 season. He was selected for the All-Star Futures Game. He moved up to the Triple-A Indianapolis Indians in 2004.

In 2005, Hart batted .308 with 17 home runs and 69 RBIs in 113 games for the Triple-A Nashville Sounds. While there, Hart played alongside future major league teammates Prince Fielder and J. J. Hardy. He also had 31 stolen bases. Hart continued to play in both the minor and major leagues through 2006, and was regarded as one of Milwaukee's top prospects.

== Major league career ==
=== Milwaukee Brewers ===
Hart made his MLB debut with the Brewers on May 25, 2004. Hart's next game in the majors was Sunday, August 14, 2005, when he hit his first MLB home run, a three-run blast against the Cincinnati Reds into the upper deck at Miller Park. Hart played 87 games for the major league club in 2006 and was with the Brewers for the entire 2007 season, mainly seeing action in right field. Hart also led off for the Brewers for almost half of the 2007 season when second baseman Rickie Weeks was on the disabled list.

In spring training in 2007, Hart, who stands at 6 ft 6 in (1.98 m), recorded the fastest 60 yard dash of any player on the Brewers roster.

During the 2007 season, Hart had a 22-game hitting streak which was snapped in a July 7 game against the Washington Nationals, as Hart went 0-for-4 with a walk. In 2007, Hart became the first Brewer since 2003 to steal 20 bases and hit 20 home runs in a season. He and Ryan Braun were the first two Brewers to have two 20–20 seasons.

In 2008, Hart was selected as an outfielder to the National League team at the Major League Baseball All-Star Game, which took place on July 15 at Yankee Stadium. He was voted in by the fans as a final vote, beating out David Wright of the Mets, Pat Burrell of the Phillies, Aaron Rowand of the Giants, and Carlos Lee of the Astros. On August 30, Hart became the first player in Brewers history to have consecutive 20–20 seasons. Hart reached base on an error 14 times in 2008, more than any other batter in the NL.

On May 29, 2010, Hart hit his first major league grand slam. In that game against the Mets he also hit a two-run home run. In July, Hart was voted by his peers to play in the All-Star Game in Anaheim and also was chosen to participate in the Home Run Derby. Hart had a breakout season in 2010 statistically. As the regular Brewers right fielder, he posted a career-best 31 home runs, 102 RBIs, and a .283 batting average.

On May 23, 2011, Hart tied the Brewers records for home runs in a game with three and RBIs with seven. Hart had another productive regular season with the Brewers in 2011, posting 26 home runs, and 63 RBIs with a .285 batting average, .386 OBP, and .866 OPS. Hart's drop in home runs and RBIs is a result of missing the first three weeks of the season with an injury. He batted leadoff beginning in July, limiting his chances to drive in runs.

Hart started the 2012 season as the Brewers regular right fielder, but injuries to Brewers first basemen Mat Gamel and Travis Ishikawa resulted in Hart becoming the Brewers starting first baseman, where he ended up having a successful season, recording a .995 fielding percentage playing in over 100 games at first base. He had a productive offensive season with the Brewers in 2012, batting .270 with 30 home runs and 83 RBIs.

Hart had surgery on his left knee in January 2013 and missed the entire 2013 season.

=== Seattle Mariners ===
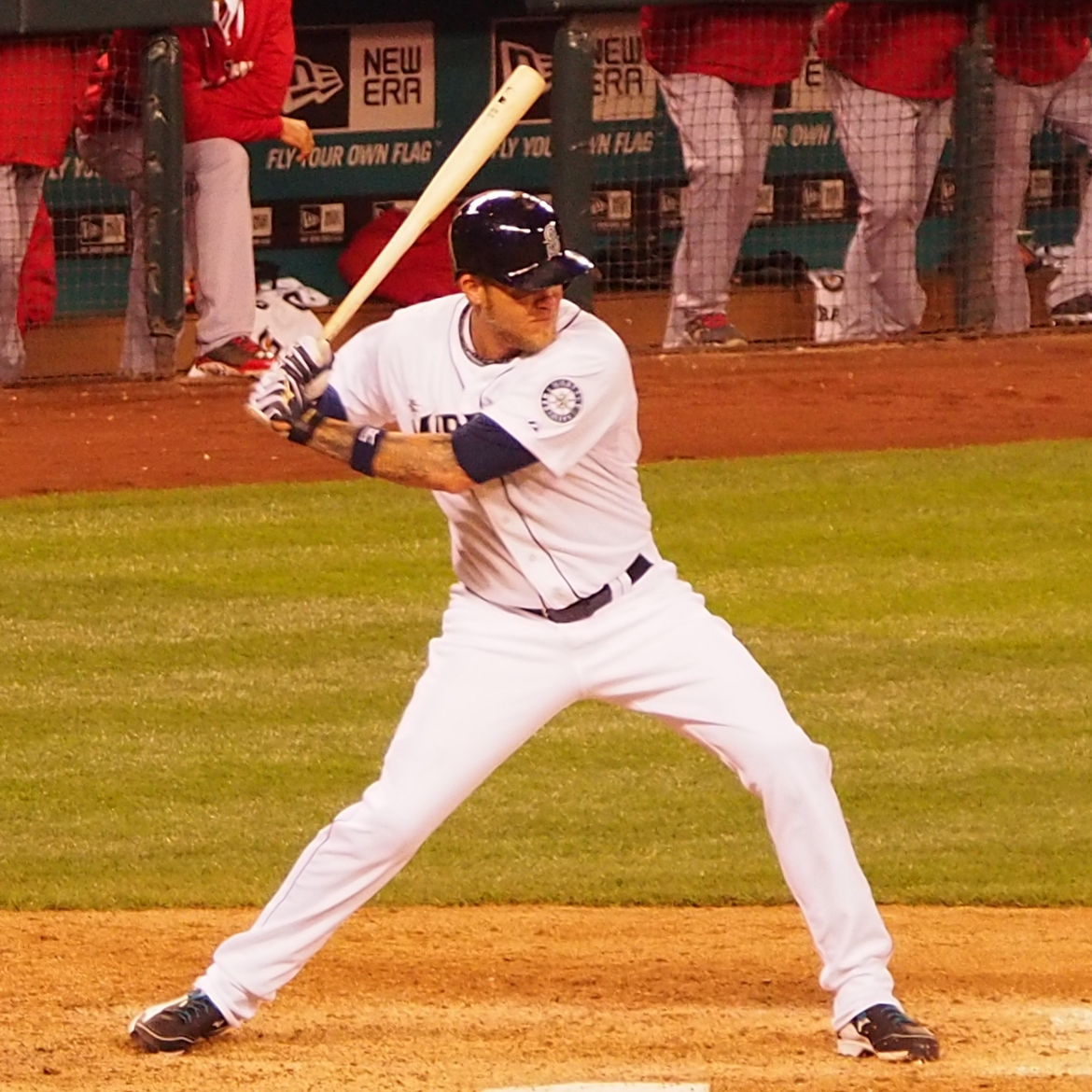
Hart with the Seattle Mariners in 2014

On December 11, 2013, Hart agreed to a one-year, $6 million contract with the Seattle Mariners. The deal contained up to $7 million in incentives. In 68 games in 2014, he batted .203 with 6 home runs. He was designated for assignment on September 29.

=== Pittsburgh Pirates ===
The Pittsburgh Pirates signed Hart to a one-year, $2.5 million contract on December 19, 2014.

Hart finished his professional baseball career in 2015.

=== Retirement with the Milwaukee Brewers ===
On June 27, 2017, it was announced that Hart would officially retire from Major League Baseball as a Milwaukee Brewer after being honored at Miller Park on June 30 with a plaque on the park's Wall of Honor. A two-time All-Star, Hart spent nine of his 11 major league seasons with the Brewers, batting .276 with 154 home runs, 508 RBI, and 83 stolen bases in 945 games. He had five 20-home-run seasons in Milwaukee, tied with four others for fourth-most in franchise history. Among the 38 players who have at least 2,000 plate appearances for the Brewers, his .491 slugging percentage ranks sixth all-time.

=== Career statistics ===
In 1048 games over 11 seasons, Hart compiled a .271 batting average (1009-for-3729) with 549 runs, 221 doubles, 33 triples, 162 home runs, 538 RBI, 85 stolen bases, 286 walks, .329 on-base percentage and .478 slugging percentage. Defensively, he recorded a .988 fielding percentage playing all three outfield positions and first base. In the postseason, Hart batted .241 (13-for-54) with 6 runs, 2 home runs and 5 RBI in 14 playoff games.

== Personal life ==
Hart is married and has four children. After retiring, his family lived near Phoenix, Arizona.

Hart is a Christian.

Hart helped pay for an indoor baseball facility for Bowling Green Little League in 2015.
