= Josh Butler (baseball) =

American baseball player (born 1984)

- Pitcher
- Born: December 11, 1984 (age 40); Auburn, California, U.S.
- Batted: Right Threw: Right

MLB debut
- September 21, 2009, for the Milwaukee Brewers

Last MLB appearance
- September 27, 2009, for the Milwaukee Brewers

MLB statistics
- Win–loss record: 0–0
- Earned run average: 9.00
- Strikeouts: 3
- Stats at Baseball Reference

Teams
- Milwaukee Brewers (2009)

Joshua James Butler (born December 11, 1984) is an American former Major League Baseball pitcher who played for the Milwaukee Brewers in 2009.

== College career ==
Butler attended the University of San Diego, where he played college baseball for the Toreros from 2004 to 2006. In 2004, he played collegiate summer baseball in the Cape Cod Baseball League for the Yarmouth-Dennis Red Sox.

== Professional career ==
=== Tampa Bay Devil Rays ===
Butler was drafted by the Tampa Bay Devil Rays in the 2nd round of the 2006 amateur entry draft. He played his first professional season with their Class A (Short Season) Hudson Valley Renegades in 2006. Butler spent the 2007 season with the Class A Columbus Catfish and Class A-Advanced Vero Beach Devil Rays.

=== Milwaukee Brewers ===
He began the 2008 season with Vero Beach, but was traded to the Milwaukee Brewers organization in exchange for outfielder Gabe Gross in late-April.

Upon arrival in the Brewers' farm system, he was assigned to the Class A-Advanced Brevard County Manatees. During the 2009 minor league season, he played for four teams in the organization: the Arizona League Brewers (Rookie league), Brevard County, Huntsville Stars (Double-A), and Nashville Sounds (Triple-A). On September 15, he was promoted from Huntsville to Milwaukee to fill the roster spot vacated when pitcher Mark DiFelice was placed on the 60-Day disabled list. He split the 2010 season between Nashville, Huntsville, and Brevard County. In December 2010, he was outrighted to Nashville.

=== Bridgeport Bluefish ===
Butler signed with the Bridgeport Bluefish of the Atlantic League of Professional Baseball for the 2011 season. In 18 starts 89.1 innings he struggled going 3-11 with a 5.64 ERA with more walks (47) than strikeouts (45).
