= Hernán Iribarren =

Venezuelan baseball player (born 1984)

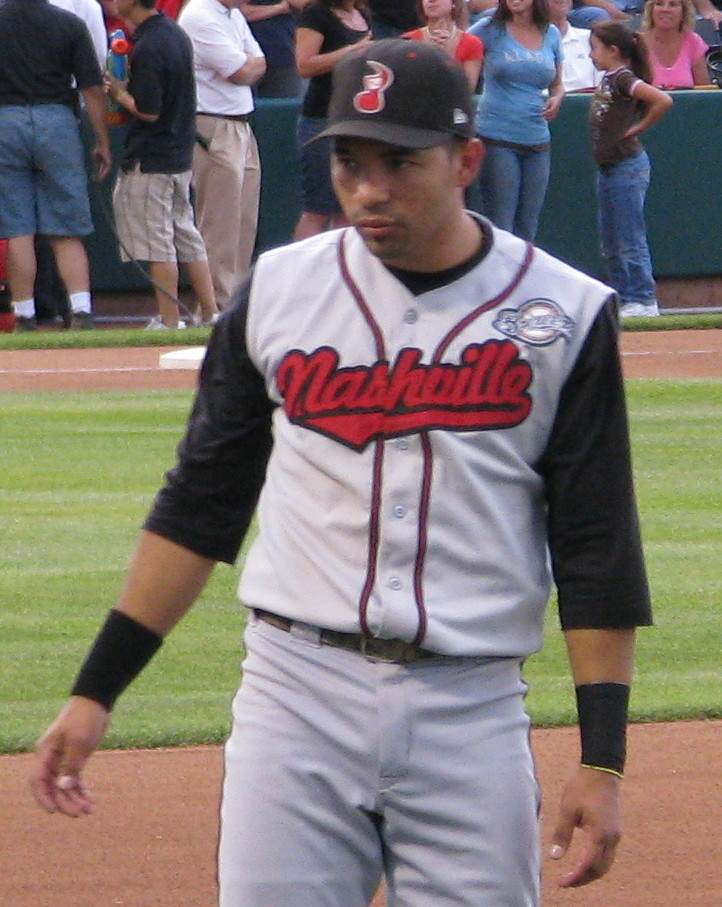
- Iribarren with the Nashville Sounds in 2009
- Infielder / Coach
- Born: June 29, 1984 (age 41); Barquisimeto, Venezuela
- Batted: Left Threw: Right

MLB debut
- April 12, 2008, for the Milwaukee Brewers

Last MLB appearance
- October 2, 2016, for the Cincinnati Reds

MLB statistics
- Batting average: .264
- Home runs: 0
- Runs batted in: 4
- Stats at Baseball Reference

Teams
- Milwaukee Brewers (2008–2009); Cincinnati Reds (2016)

Hernán Alcides Iribarren (born June 29, 1984) is a Venezuelan former professional baseball infielder and current coach. He played in Major League Baseball (MLB) for the Milwaukee Brewers and Cincinnati Reds.

== Professional career ==
=== Milwaukee Brewers ===
==== Minor leagues ====
Iribarren was first signed as an undrafted free agent by the Milwaukee Brewers on March 26, 2002. He spent his first professional season (2004) with the rookie–level Arizona League Brewers and Single–A Beloit Snappers.

Iribarren stayed at the Single–A level in 2005, playing with the West Virginia Power. He was promoted to the High–A Brevard County Manatees in 2006, and then the Double–A Huntsville Stars in 2007. On March 14, 2008, Iribarren was assigned the Brewers' Triple–A affiliate, the Nashville Sounds.

Iribarren also played two seasons in the Dominican Summer League. After playing in 130 games, he accumulated a .329 batting average, 4 home runs, 61 RBI, and 24 stolen bases.

==== Major leagues ====
After beginning the 2008 season in the minor leagues, Iribarren was recalled on April 10, 2008. The team planned to use him in the outfield as well as the infield. On April 12, Iribarren got his first career hit off Carlos Muñiz of the New York Mets, a single to shallow center. Iribarren saw sporadic playing time with Milwaukee in 2008 and 2009, spending much of his time with Triple–A Nashville. He went 2–for–14 (.143) with one RBI in 12 games in 2008, and went 3–for–13 (.231) with one RBI in another 12 games in 2009.

=== Texas Rangers ===
On March 13, 2010, Iribarren was claimed off waivers by the Texas Rangers. On March 24, he was removed from the 40–man roster and sent outright to the Triple–A Oklahoma City RedHawks. In 128 games for Oklahoma City, Iribarren hit .275/.333/.385 with eight home runs, 70 RBI, and 10 stolen bases. He became a free agent after the 2010 season ended.

=== Colorado Rockies ===
On January 5, 2011, it was reported that Iribarren signed a minor league contract with the Colorado Rockies that included an invitation to spring training. He suffered a knee injury in spring training and missed the entire 2011 season. Iribarren elected free agency after the season.

On January 31, 2012, Iribarren re–signed with the Rockies on a new minor league contract. He spent the season with the Triple–A Colorado Springs SkySox, batting .302/.368/.378 with one home run, 40 RBI, and 20 stolen bases. Iribarren became a free agent following the season.

On December 7, 2012, Iribarren re–signed with the Rockies organization on another minor league contract. Playing in 84 games for Colorado Springs in 2013, he hit .312/.368/.407 with two home runs, 32 RBI, and nine stolen bases. Iribarren elected free agency following the season on November 4.

=== Cincinnati Reds ===
On January 17, 2014, Iribarren signed a minor league contract with the Cincinnati Reds. In 99 games for the Triple–A Louisville Bats, he hit .233/.304/.297 with one home run and 20 RBI. Iribarren returned to Louisville in 2015, playing in 111 contests and slashing .256/.324/.305 with one home run and 28 RBI. He elected free agency following the season on November 6, 2015.

On November 23, 2015, Iribarren re-signed with the club on a new minor league contract, and began the 2016 season with Louisville. On September 4, 2016, the Reds selected Iribarren's contract, adding him to their active roster. In 24 games for Cincinnati, he batted .311/.311/.444 with two RBI and one stolen base. On October 28, Iribarren was removed from the 40–man roster and sent outright to Triple–A Louisville. He elected free agency following the season on November 7.

On December 9, 2016, Iribarren signed another minor league contract with Cincinnati. In 2017, he played in 94 games for the Triple–A Louisville Bats, Iribarren hit .285/.331/.382 with 4 home runs and 32 RBI. He elected free agency following the season on November 6, 2017.

On March 25, 2018, Iribarren re–signed with Cincinnati on a minor league deal. He played in 82 games for Triple–A Louisville, slashing .265/.325/.349 with no home runs and 15 RBI. Iribarren elected free agency following the season on November 2. On March 22, 2019, re-signed to a minor league deal with the Reds. However, he did not appear in any games and was released on June 16.

== Coaching career ==
He had retired as an active player and signed on as bench coach for the Billings Mustangs of the Pioneer League for the 2019 season. Iribarren became the bench coach for the Dayton Dragons in 2020.

== See also ==
- List of Major League Baseball players from Venezuela
