= Mike Burns (baseball) =

American baseball player (born 1978)

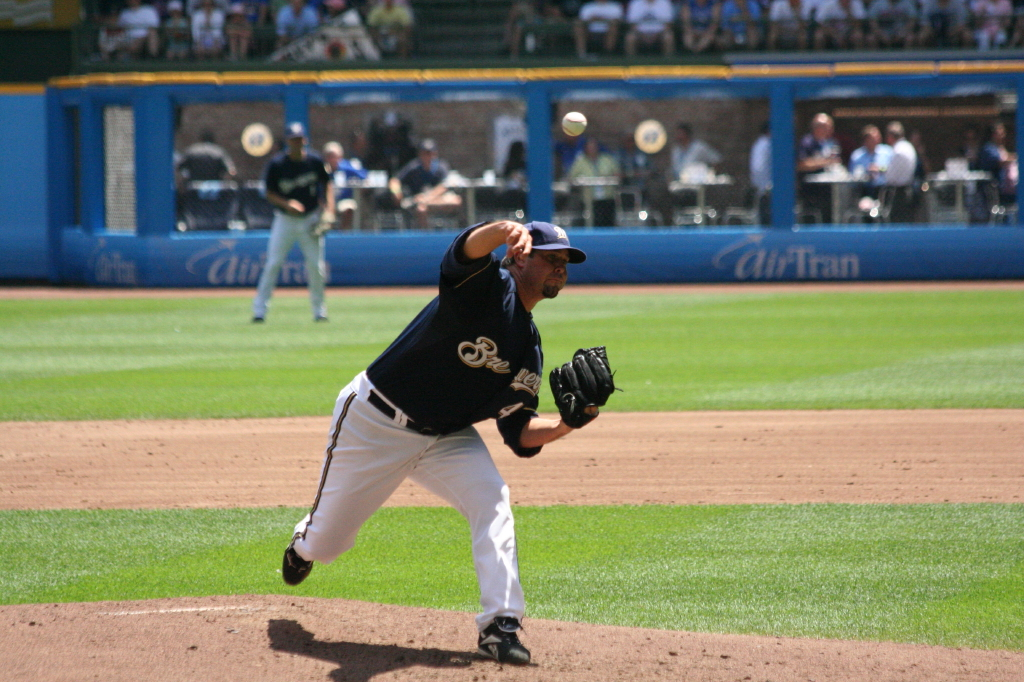
- Burns with the Milwaukee Brewers
- Pitcher
- Born: July 14, 1978 (age 47); Westminster, California, U.S.
- Batted: Right Threw: Right

MLB debut
- May 13, 2005, for the Houston Astros

Last MLB appearance
- September 22, 2009, for the Milwaukee Brewers

MLB statistics
- Win–loss record: 3–5
- Earned run average: 5.99
- Strikeouts: 73
- Stats at Baseball Reference

Teams
- Houston Astros (2005); Cincinnati Reds (2006); Boston Red Sox (2006); Milwaukee Brewers (2009)

Michael John Burns (born July 14, 1978) is an American former professional baseball pitcher who played in Major League Baseball for the Houston Astros, the Boston Red Sox, the Cincinnati Reds and the Milwaukee Brewers. He is on the coaching staff of the Easton Blackdogs at Caira Baseball Academy.

== Early life ==
Burns was born in Westminster, California, and graduated from Diamond Bar High School in 1996. Burns attended California State University, Los Angeles. He has a degree in criminal justice.

== Professional career ==
A 2000 draft pick by the Houston Astros, In 2000, Burns's rookie season was with the Martinsville Astros posting a 2–7 record with a 4.52 ERA. In 2001, Burns was on the Michigan Battle Cats and had a 7–7 record with a 3.95 ERA. In 2002, Burns posted a 2.49 ERA with the Battle Cats. In 2003, he was promoted to the Round Rock Express, but had a disappointing season due to a 2–13 record and a 6.13 ERA. In 2004, he improved with an 11–3 record and a 2.67 ERA. In 2005, he was promoted to Triple-A Round Rock Express and posted a 2–1 record and a 2.11 ERA. Burns made his major league debut in later 2005. He spent part of 2006 with the Cincinnati Reds with an 8.78 ERA until he was traded on August 28. Burns was called up from the Triple-A Pawtucket Red Sox to the major league team the following day. He signed with the Pittsburgh Pirates for the 2008 season but was released during spring training. He then signed with the Chicago Cubs, becoming a free agent at the end of the season. In January 2009, he signed a minor league contract with the Brewers; on June 2, he was called up to the major leagues following the release of Jorge Julio and made his first major league start on June 25, 2009, against the Minnesota Twins earning a loss.

On October 13, 2009, Burns was optioned to Triple-A Nashville, removing him from the Brewers 40-man roster. He was released on March 31, 2010.

In 2011, Mike Burns signed with Olmecas de Tabasco and had a 1–1 record with an 8.68 ERA.

On February 11, 2013, Burns signed with the Wichita Wingnuts of the American Association of Independent Professional Baseball as their bullpen coach.

Signed with the Lincoln Saltdogs on June 9, 2013, as a pitcher.

Mike Burns is a pitching coach for the UC Riverside Highlanders baseball as of January 2022.
