= Mark DiFelice =

American baseball player & coach (born 1976)

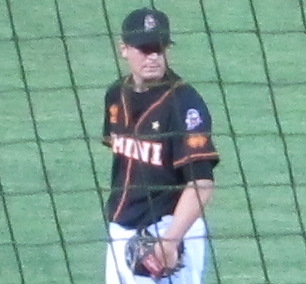
- Mark DiFelice playing for Rimini Baseball Club in 2012.
- Pitcher
- Born: August 23, 1976 (age 49); Bryn Mawr, Pennsylvania, U.S.
- Batted: Right Threw: Right

MLB debut
- May 18, 2008, for the Milwaukee Brewers

Last MLB appearance
- June 25, 2011, for the Milwaukee Brewers

MLB statistics
- Win–loss record: 5–1
- Earned run average: 3.79
- Strikeouts: 71
- Stats at Baseball Reference

Teams
- Milwaukee Brewers (2008–2009, 2011)

Mark Andrew DiFelice (born August 23, 1976) is an American former Major League pitcher. Growing up in Havertown, Pennsylvania, Mark played for Hilltop Baseball and is currently the only player from that league (established in 1963) to play in MLB. He played in Major League Baseball (MLB) for the Milwaukee Brewers. He is currently working as a pitching coach for the Wilmington Blue Rocks.

== Minor league career ==
DiFelice started his professional career as a part of the Colorado Rockies organization in 1998. He played his first season for their Class A (Short Season) affiliate, the Portland Rockies. In 1999, DiFelice advanced to the Class A-Advanced Salem Avalanche. In 2000, he played for the Double-A Carolina Mudcats. DiFelice also played part of the 2001 season for Carolina, while also pitching for the Triple-A Colorado Springs Sky Sox. In 2002, he was sent back down to the Class A (Short Season) Tri-City Dust Devils and Salem. In 2003, he played for the Rockies' new Double-A affiliate, the Tulsa Drillers.

In 2004, DiFelice switched to the Baltimore Orioles organization, playing for their Triple-A Ottawa Lynx. In 2005, DiFelice pitched for the Washington Nationals with their Triple-A New Orleans Zephyrs and the independent Atlantic League's Somerset Patriots. He stayed with the Atlantic League for 2006, playing for the Camden Riversharks.

DiFelice returned to affiliated baseball in 2007, playing for the Milwaukee Brewers' Double-A Huntsville Stars, and then their Triple-A Nashville Sounds. After his first ten professional seasons, DiFelice had a record of 77–57, with an ERA of 3.53, and had recorded 951 strikeouts.

== Major league career ==
After starting the 2008 season in Nashville, posting a 3–0 record with a 3.91 ERA, DiFelice's contract was purchased by Milwaukee on May 15, and he made his major league debut three days later, May 18. On June 29, after appearing in 10 games, DiFelice was sent back down to Nashville. He received a call up on September 1, 2008, and he picked up his first major league win in the same month.

DiFelice spent the whole 2009 season in the big leagues. He finished with a 4–1 record with 51.2 innings pitched and a 3.66 ERA. Following the 2009 season, DiFelice underwent shoulder surgery, which sidelined him for the entire 2010 season. He signed a minor league contract with an invitation to 2011 spring training while pitching in the fall instructional league.

On June 18, 2011, DiFelice had his contract purchased by the Brewers. He made it back to the major leagues only to have his shoulder give out again, requiring a 3rd surgery and ending his 2011 season. In 2012, DiFelice signed with an Italian team.

== Coaching career ==
DiFelice was named as the pitching coach for the Wilmington Blue Rocks in the Washington Nationals organization.

== World Baseball Classic ==
DiFelice was selected as a pitcher for the Italian national team in the 2009 World Baseball Classic. He started in the team's opening game against Venezuela, pitching four shutout innings while allowing three hits and striking out one batter, finishing the game with a no decision after leaving the game scoreless.

== Personal ==
DiFelice has served as the unofficial barber of all the teams he has played for. His grandmother was a hairdresser, and his aunt owns a salon in Newtown Square, Pennsylvania. When word spread that DiFelice cut hair, his teammates began making appointments for haircuts in the clubhouse.
