= Rickie Weeks Jr. =

American baseball player and coach (born 1982)

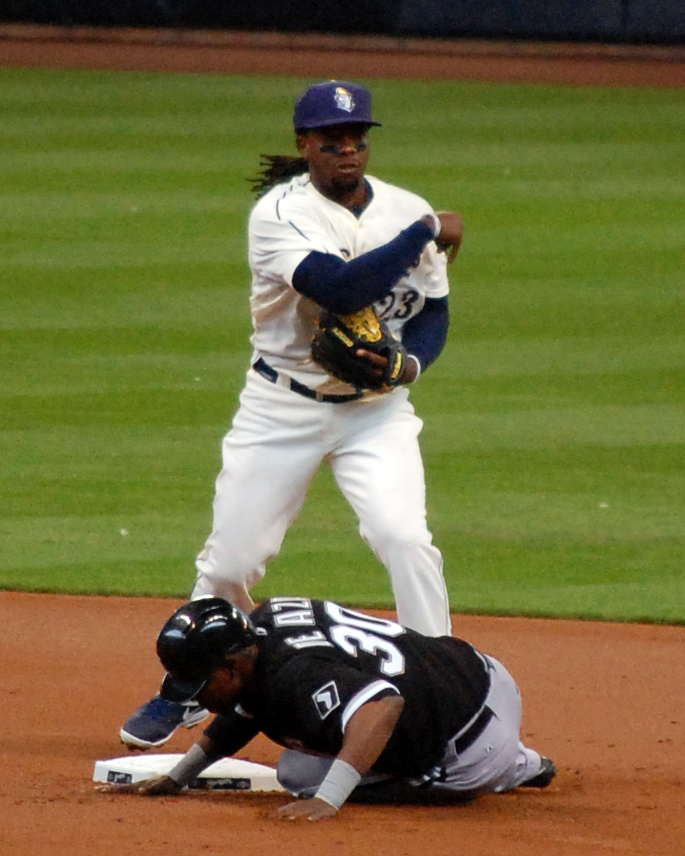
- Weeks with the Milwaukee Brewers in 2013
- Second baseman
- Born: September 13, 1982 (age 43); Altamonte Springs, Florida, U.S.
- Batted: Right Threw: Right

MLB debut
- September 15, 2003, for the Milwaukee Brewers

Last MLB appearance
- June 6, 2017, for the Tampa Bay Rays

MLB statistics
- Batting average: .246
- Home runs: 161
- Runs batted in: 474
- Stats at Baseball Reference

Teams
- Milwaukee Brewers (2003, 2005–2014); Seattle Mariners (2015); Arizona Diamondbacks (2016); Tampa Bay Rays (2017)

Career highlights and awards
- All-Star (2011); Golden Spikes Award (2003); Dick Howser Trophy (2003); Milwaukee Brewers Wall of Honor

Rickie Darnell Weeks Jr. (born September 13, 1982) is an American former professional baseball second baseman and coach in Major League Baseball (MLB). Between 2003 and 2017, he played in MLB for the Milwaukee Brewers, Seattle Mariners, Arizona Diamondbacks, and Tampa Bay Rays. He was an MLB All-Star in 2011. After retiring as a player, Weeks has worked in the Brewers organization, serving as associate manager in 2024 and 2025.

Weeks set college baseball records, winning the Golden Spikes Award and Dick Howser Trophy at Southern University in 2003. The Brewers drafted him with the second pick in that summer's draft.

== Amateur career ==
Born and raised in Altamonte Springs, Florida, Weeks attended Lake Brantley High School. At Lake Brantley, Weeks played baseball, but also played football as a cornerback and wide receiver for a season. Weeks then attended Southern University in Baton Rouge, Louisiana. As a sophomore in 2002, he batted .495 with 20 home runs, winning the NCAA Division I batting title. The next year, he batted .479 with 16 home runs, winning a second straight batting title and finishing his career with a .465 batting average (254-for-546), highest in NCAA history. In 2003, he also was named Baseball America College Player of the Year and the Golden Spikes Award, given annually to the top amateur player. The Milwaukee Brewers selected him second overall in the 2003 MLB draft.

== Professional career ==
=== Milwaukee Brewers ===
==== 2003–2009 ====
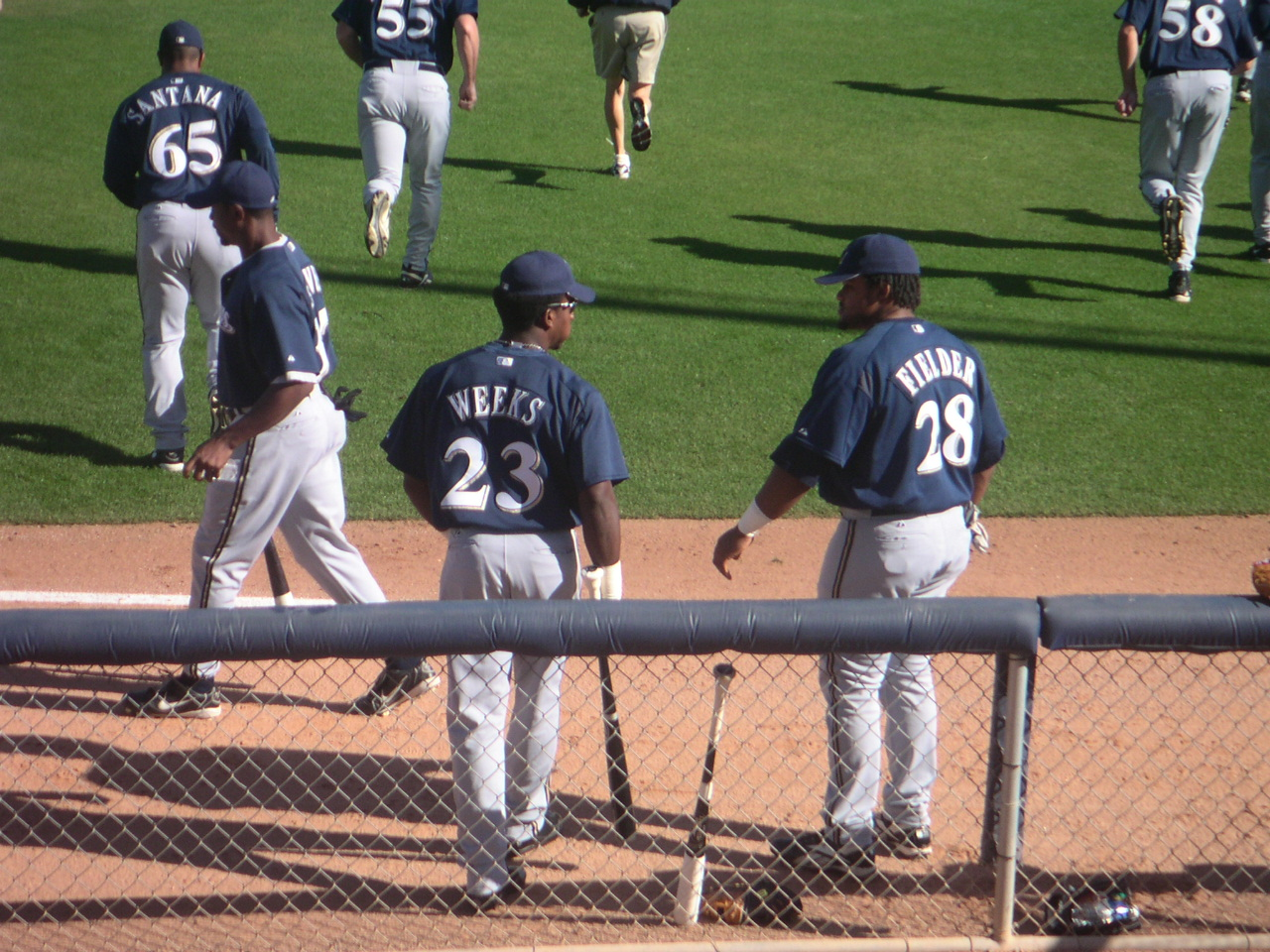
Rickie Weeks and Prince Fielder at Brewers spring training in 2005

Weeks signed a contract with a $3.6 million signing bonus. He made his major league debut on September 15, 2003.

Weeks did not become a full-time player for the Brewers until June 2005, when he was recalled from the Triple-A Nashville Sounds, despite playing much of the 2005 season with a thumb injury. In his first full MLB season in 2005, Weeks had a batting average of .239 to go with 13 home runs and 15 stolen bases in 96 games. These HR/SB number are consistent with his minor league totals (playing in 209 games) of 21 home runs and 24 stolen bases. In 2006, Weeks hit .279 with 8 home runs, 34 RBIs, and 19 stolen bases in 95 games.

Weeks was sent down to Nashville on July 31, 2007, since he was batting below .200 after returning from a wrist injury.

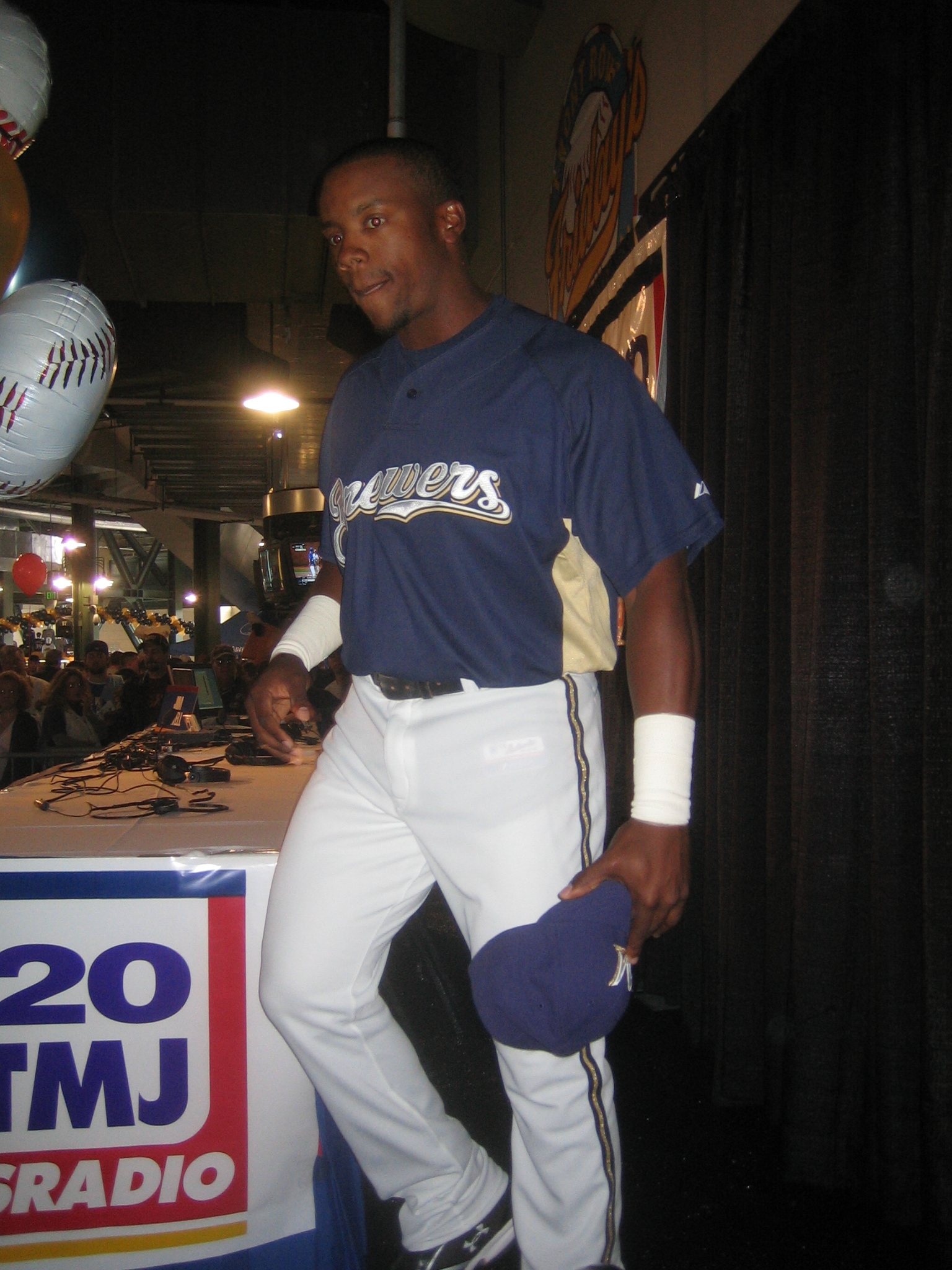
Weeks in 2007

In 2008, he had the lowest fielding percentage (.975) and the most errors (15) of all NL second basemen. On offense, however, Weeks scored 46.6% of the time he reached base, second-best in the NL.

In Game 1 of the 2008 NL Division Series, Weeks made a key error in the third inning that led to three unearned runs scored by the Phillies in Philadelphia's 3–1 victory. In Game 3, Weeks injured his knee while trying to beat out a throw at first base. He underwent surgery the next day to remove torn cartilage from his left knee.

On February 3, 2009, Weeks and the Brewers reached a one-year deal worth $2.45 million, thereby avoiding salary arbitration. Weeks could have earned an additional $100,000 in performance bonuses based on plate appearances from 575 to 650. In early 2009, sabermetrician Bill James wrote in John Dewan's "The Fielding Bible Volume II," that Weeks should be moved to a position other than second base, as he had 44 defensive misplays that season. Dewan ranked Weeks the worst starting second baseman in the majors. Other advanced metrics in 2008, however, saw him as being only slightly below average.

Back atop the lineup to begin the 2009 season, Weeks had a .281/.333/.486 start with five home runs in April. On May 18, Weeks was diagnosed with a torn muscle in his left wrist and missed the remainder of the 2009 season. At the time of his injury, Weeks was tied with Prince Fielder for the team lead in home runs.

==== 2010–2014 ====
Playing in 160 games in 2010, Weeks recorded his finest season as a pro, and perhaps the best all-around season a Brewer second baseman has ever had. On June 12, Weeks tallied his 500th hit at Miller Park and received a standing ovation. Weeks finished with a career-high 29 home runs and 83 RBIs, a .269 average, and a strong .366 on-base percentage. His WAR of 6.0 rated second among all regular second basemen, behind only Robinson Canó. He led the NL in at bats (651), plate appearances (754), and hit by pitch (25) and was second in runs scored (112).

On February 16, 2011, Weeks signed a contract extension for 4 years at $38 million. The deal included an option for a 5th year provided Weeks is an everyday player in 2013 and 2014, and could raise the total value of the contract to $50 million.

Weeks was voted by the fans to be the starting second baseman for the National League in the 2011 All-Star Game. Weeks sustained a severe ankle sprain while legging out an infield single in July. Weeks was placed on the DL until early September, and his offensive production was significantly hampered down the stretch. On September 27, in the second-to-last game of the regular season, Weeks hit one of the longest home runs ever hit at Miller Park, off the stadium club windows in left field. It was his first home run since his return from the DL, and his 20th of the season. He ended his regular season at .269 with 20 home runs. Advanced defensive metrics pegged him as a league-average defender at the keystone, and his WAR of 3.3 was good for 3rd in the National League.

Despite a slow start in April and May 2012, Weeks rebounded beginning in June and posted typical power numbers, albeit with a dip in his on-base totals, which had been a hallmark of his value to that point. Weeks had a poor 2013 season, posting career lows in nearly all major offensive categories. A torn hamstring ended his season in August, and Scooter Gennett replaced him at second base.

In the 2014 season, his contract year with Milwaukee, Weeks has assumed the right-handed part of Milwaukee's productive second base platoon, starting against all left-handed starting pitchers. Although over only 286 plate appearances, he returned to pre-2012 form hitting .274/.357/.452. With Gennett, Brewers second basemen ranked fourth in the National League in Wins Above Replacement, and 11th league-wide. After the 2014 season, the Brewers declined his contract option ending his ten-year tenure with the Brewers.

=== Seattle Mariners ===
Weeks signed with the Seattle Mariners on a one-year, $2 million contract on February 13, 2015. He received sporadic playing time and had a .167 batting average with three extra base hits in 95 plate appearances through early June. He was designated for assignment on June 13 and released on June 21.

=== Arizona Diamondbacks ===
On February 27, 2016, he signed a minor league contract with the Arizona Diamondbacks. On April 2, the team announced that Weeks made Arizona's 2016 opening day roster. Primarily coming off the bench, Weeks batted .239 with 9 home runs in 108 games.

=== Tampa Bay Rays ===
On February 3, 2017, Weeks signed a minor league contract with the Tampa Bay Rays that included an invitation to spring training. On April 2, the Tampa Bay Rays announced Weeks had made the opening day roster and would platoon at first base with Logan Morrison. Weeks went on the DL on June 9 for a shoulder injury and was released on July 24. For the season, Weeks had a slash line of .216/.321/.340/ hitting 2 homeruns in 37 games (112 plate appearances) striking out 49 times. For the season, he had the highest strikeout percentage against left-handed pitchers (42.9%).

== Playing style ==
Weeks batted and threw right-handed. Early in his career, Weeks had a distinctive batting stance similar to that of Gary Sheffield, waggling his bat heavily before swinging.

While primarily a second baseman in Milwaukee, Weeks transitioned to left field in 2015 and played first base in his final season. He led NL second basemen in errors in 5 seasons and was in the top 5 in three other seasons.

== Awards ==
- Baseball America College Player of the Year – 2003
- Dick Howser Trophy – 2003
- Golden Spikes Award – 2003
- Rotary Smith Award – 2003
- Southwestern Athletic Conference's Most Outstanding Hitter – 2003
- Southwestern Athletic Conference Player of the Year – 2003
- National League starter at second base, 2011 MLB All-Star Game
- Milwaukee Brewers Wall of Honor – 2019
- Louisiana Sports Hall of Fame – 2021

== Post-playing career ==
On February 4, 2022, Weeks was hired by the Milwaukee Brewers as an assistant to the player development staff.

After the 2023 season, the Brewers named Weeks their associate manager for new manager Pat Murphy. He left that role after the 2025 season, taking the role of "special assistant – baseball operations and domestic/international scouting" for the Brewers.

== Personal life ==
Weeks married Tiphany Easterling on January 18, 2014, in Miami, Florida. Weeks is the son of Richard and Valeria Weeks. Weeks's father Richard played college baseball for Seton Hall University and Stetson University. His grandfather was an outfielder in the Negro leagues during the 1940s, and his sister Kaisha was an NCAA Regional Finalist at Southern University in track. Weeks's brother Jemile Weeks was drafted by the Brewers in 2005 out of high school, but never signed with them, choosing to attend the University of Miami instead. The Oakland Athletics drafted Jemile in the first round of the 2008 MLB draft, 12th overall.

In 2004, Weeks signed a sponsorship contract with sportswear company 3N2, which designed a shoe for him.

Weeks was inducted into the Louisiana Sports Hall of Fame in 2021.
