= Mat Gamel =

American baseball player (born 1985)

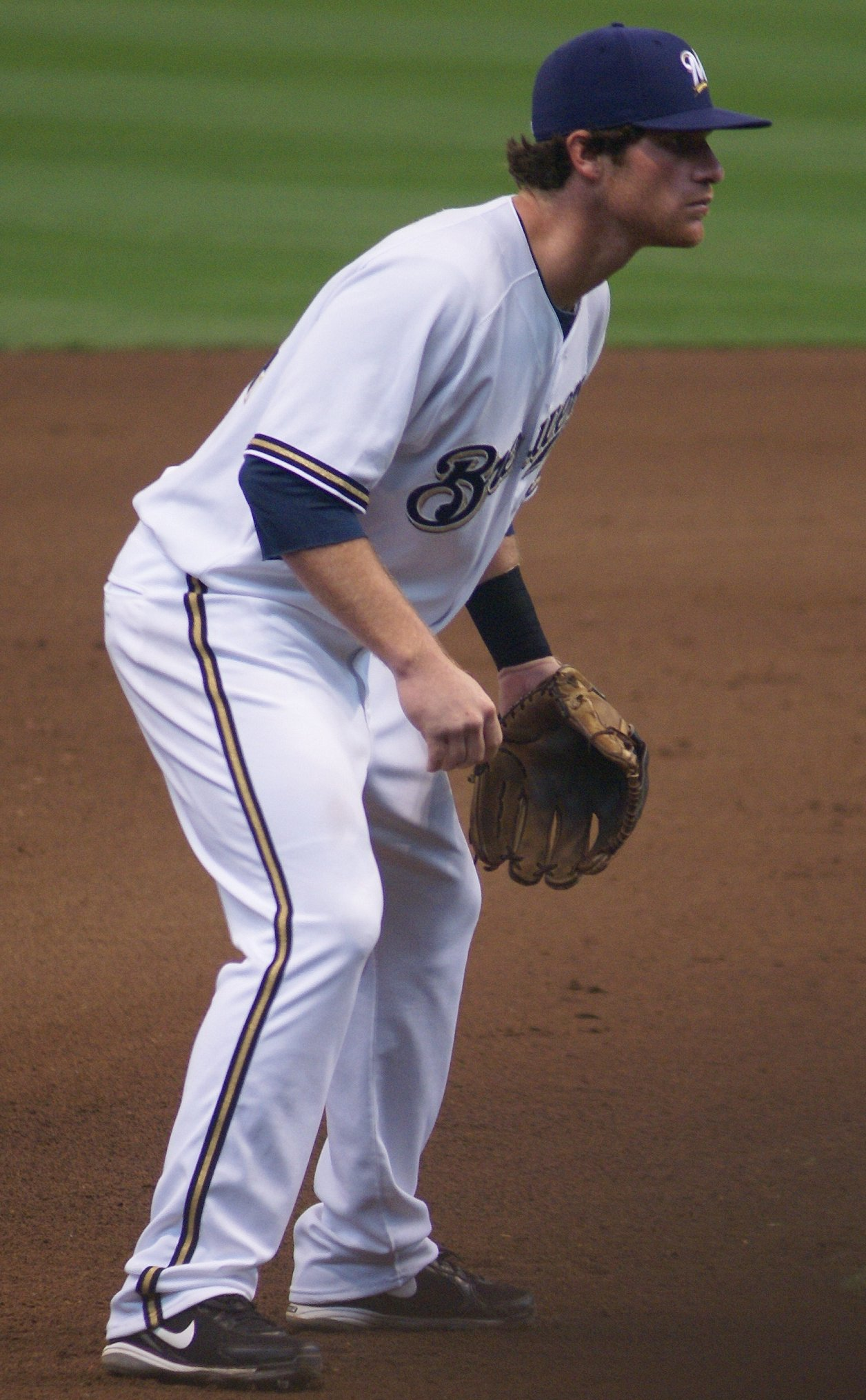
- Gamel with the Milwaukee Brewers
- First baseman / Third baseman
- Born: July 26, 1985 (age 41); Jacksonville, Florida, U.S.
- Batted: Left Threw: Right

MLB debut
- September 3, 2008, for the Milwaukee Brewers

Last MLB appearance
- May 1, 2012, for the Milwaukee Brewers

Career statistics
- Batting average: .229
- Home runs: 6
- Runs batted in: 29
- Stats at Baseball Reference

Teams
- Milwaukee Brewers (2008–2012)

Mathew Lawrence Gamel (born July 26, 1985) is an American former professional baseball first baseman. He played in Major League Baseball (MLB) for the Milwaukee Brewers across the 2008 through 2012 seasons. Once considered among the best prospects in baseball, Gamel's career was limited by injuries.

== Early life ==
Gamel attended Bishop Kenny High School in Jacksonville, Florida. He was drafted in 4th round of the 2005 Major League Baseball draft from Chipola College in Marianna, Florida.

== Baseball career ==
=== Milwaukee Brewers ===
Gamel played his first professional season in 2005 for Milwaukee's rookie-level Helena Brewers. Gamel was promoted to the Single-A West Virginia Power in 2006 and the High Single-A Brevard County Manatees in 2007 in which he posted a 33-game hitting streak bested only by Derek Jeter. He played most of the 2008 season with the Double-A Huntsville Stars before being promoted to the Triple-A Nashville Sounds on August 24. In 2008, he was selected to play in the All-Star Futures Game.

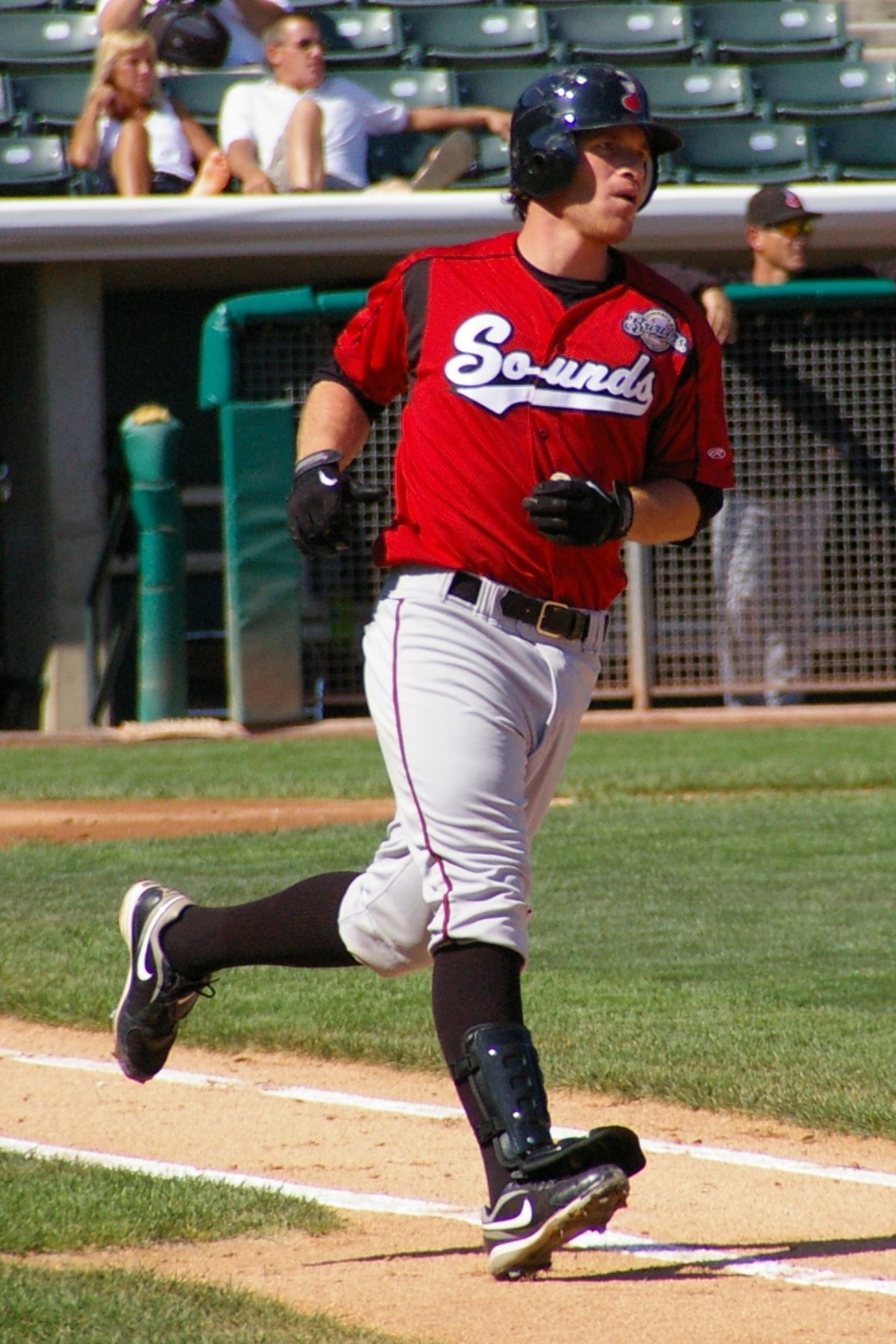
Gamel with the Nashville Sounds in 2009

Gamel was called up to the Majors for the first time when rosters expanded on September 1, 2008, and made his debut two days later, striking out in a pinch-hitting appearance. He recorded his first career hit, a double, on September 7, 2008, off of Chris Young of the San Diego Padres. He hit his first career home run on May 18, 2009, off of Kyle Lohse of the St. Louis Cardinals. However, he made his first fielding error at third base during the same game, even though he had made a great play just a few innings earlier. He hit his second home run off Jason Hammel of the Colorado Rockies.

On May 22, 2012, Gamel underwent surgery to repair a torn anterior cruciate ligament (ACL) and missed the rest of the 2012 season.

During spring training in 2013, Gamel re-tore his surgically repaired ACL and missed the entire 2013 season.

On October 3, 2013, Gamel was claimed off waivers by the Chicago Cubs. On December 2, he was non-tendered by Chicago, becoming a free agent. On December 13, Gamel signed a minor league contract with the Atlanta Braves. However, he re-injured himself doing workouts before spring training and was released by the Braves on February 18, 2014.

=== Somerset Patriots ===
On March 6, 2015, it was reported that Gamel had signed a minor league contract with the New York Yankees organization. He was released by the Yankees prior to the start of the season on March 14.

On March 31, 2015, Gamel signed with the Somerset Patriots of the Atlantic League of Professional Baseball. In 73 appearances for the Patriots, he batted .196/.258/.325 with seven home runs, 34 RBI, and one stolen base. Gamel was released by Somerset on September 1.

=== Camden Riversharks ===
On September 3, 2015, Gamel signed with the Camden Riversharks of the Atlantic League of Professional Baseball. In 15 appearances for the team, he slashed .132/.207/.208 with one home run and three RBI. Gamel became a free agent following the season.

== Personal life ==
Gamel's brother, Ben, also plays in MLB as an outfielder. Gamel is currently married with two children.
