= 2009 Cincinnati Reds season =

2009 Cincinnati Reds
- League: National League
- Division: Central
- Ballpark: Great American Ball Park
- City: Cincinnati
- Record: 78–84 (.481)
- Divisional place: 4th
- Owners: Bob Castellini
- General managers: Walt Jocketty
- Managers: Dusty Baker
- Television: FSN Ohio (Thom Brennaman, George Grande, Chris Welsh, Kent Mercker)
- Radio: WLW (700 AM); Cincinnati Bell Reds Radio Network (Marty Brennaman, Jeff Brantley, Jim Kelch)
- Stats: ESPN.com; Baseball Reference

The 2009 Cincinnati Reds season was the 140th season for the franchise in Major League Baseball, and their seventh at Great American Ball Park in Cincinnati. It involved the Cincinnati Reds attempting to win the National League Central after finishing fifth in the division the previous year. For the second year, the Reds were managed by Dusty Baker. The Reds played their seventh season of home games in Great American Ball Park. The Reds finished the 2009 season 78-84, only four wins more than the 2008 season.

== Regular season ==
=== Standings ===
NL Central
Team	W	L	Pct.	GB	Home	Road
St. Louis Cardinals	91	71	.562	—	46‍–‍35	45‍–‍36
Chicago Cubs	83	78	.516	7½	46‍–‍34	37‍–‍44
Milwaukee Brewers	80	82	.494	11	40‍–‍41	40‍–‍41
Cincinnati Reds	78	84	.481	13	40‍–‍41	38‍–‍43
Houston Astros	74	88	.457	17	44‍–‍37	30‍–‍51
Pittsburgh Pirates	62	99	.385	28½	40‍–‍41	22‍–‍58

=== Record vs. opponents ===
2009 National League record Source: MLB Standings Grid – 2009
Team	AZ	ATL	CHC	CIN	COL	FLA	HOU	LAD	MIL	NYM	PHI	PIT	SD	SF	STL	WAS	AL
Arizona	–	3–4	4-2	1–5	7-11	5–3	5–4	7-11	2–5	5–2	1–5	6–1	11-7	5-13	2–4	1–5	5–10
Atlanta	4–3	–	4–2	3–6	4–4	8-10	3-3	4–3	3–3	13–5	10-8	3–4	3–3	3–4	4–2	10-8	7–8
Chicago	2-4	2–4	–	10-5	2–4	4–3	11–6	3–5	10-7	3-3	1–5	10-4	4–5	4-2	6-10	5–2	6–9
Cincinnati	5-1	6-3	5-10	–	0-7	3-3	12-4	1-5	8-7	2-4	2-5	13-5	1-6	3-3	8-8	3-4	6-9
Colorado	11-7	4-4	4-2	7-0	–	2-4	2-5	4-14	6-0	3-4	2-4	6-3	10-8	8-10	6-1	6-0	11-4
Florida	3-5	10-8	3-4	3-3	4-2	–	4–3	3-3	3-4	11-7	9-9	2-4	4-2	3-4	3-3	12-6	10-8
Houston	4–5	3-3	6-11	4-12	5-2	3-4	–	4–3	5-10	1-5	6-2	10-5	6-1	2-4	6-9	3-3	6-9
Los Angeles	11-7	3-4	5-3	5-1	14-4	3-3	3-4	–	3–3	5-1	4-3	4-3	10-8	11-7	2-5	3-2	9-9
Milwaukee	5-2	3-3	7-10	7-8	0-6	4-3	10-5	3-3	–	3-3	4-3	9-5	2-4	4-5	9-9	5-3	5-10
New York	2-5	5-13	3-3	4-2	4-3	7-11	5-1	1-5	3-3	–	6-12	4-3	2-5	5-3	4-5	10-8	5–10
Philadelphia	5-1	8-10	5-1	5-2	4-2	9-9	2-6	3-4	3-4	12-6	–	4-2	5-2	3-4	4-1	15-3	6-12
Pittsburgh	1-6	4-3	4-10	5-13	3-6	4-2	5-10	3-4	5-9	3-4	2-4	–	3-4	2-4	5-10	5-3	8–7
San Diego	7-11	3-3	5-4	6-1	8-10	2-4	1-6	8-10	4-2	5-2	2-5	4-3	–	10-8	1-6	4-2	5–10
San Francisco	13-5	4–3	2–4	3–3	10-8	4–3	4–2	7-11	5-4	3–5	4–3	4–2	8-10	–	4–3	4–2	9–6
St. Louis	4-2	2-4	10-6	8-8	1-6	3-3	9-6	5-2	9-9	5-4	1-4	10-5	6-1	3-4	–	6–1	9–6
Washington	5-1	8-10	2-5	4-3	0-6	6-12	3-3	2-3	3-5	8-10	3-15	3-5	2-4	2-4	1-6	–	7–11

=== Game log ===
2009 Game Log
April (11–10)

#	Date	Opponent	Score	Win	Loss	Save	Attendance	Record
1	April 6	Mets	2–1	Santana (1–0)	Harang (0–1)	Rodríguez (1)	42,177	0–1
2	April 8	Mets	9–7	Pelfrey (1–0)	Vólquez (0–1)	Rodríguez (2)	13,568	0–2
3	April 9	Mets	8–6	Arroyo (1–0)	Pérez (0–1)	Cordero (1)	17,837	1–2
	April 10	Pirates	Postponed. Rescheduled for August 31					
4	April 11	Pirates	10–2	Maholm (1–0)	Cueto (0–1)		22,276	1–3
5	April 12	Pirates	2–0	Harang (1–1)	Snell (0–2)		12,876	2–3
6	April 13	@ Brewers	7–6	Vólquez (1–1)	Gallardo (1–1)	Cordero (2)	25,016	3–3
7	April 14	@ Brewers	6–1	Arroyo (2–0)	Parra (0–2)		27,441	4–3
8	April 15	@ Brewers	9–3	Looper (1–0)	Owings (0–1)		30,349	4–4
9	April 17	@ Astros	2–1	Masset (1–0)	Valverde (0–1)	Cordero (3)	32,268	5–4
10	April 18	@ Astros	7–0	Rodríguez (1–1)	Harang (1–2)		30,141	5–5
11	April 19	@ Astros	4–2	Vólquez (2–1)	Geary (0–1)	Cordero (4)	29,372	6–5
12	April 20	@ Astros	4–3	Arroyo (3–0)	Geary (0–2)	Cordero (5)	23,308	7–5
13	April 21	@ Cubs	7–2	Harden (1–1)	Owings (0–2)		38,403	7–6
14	April 22	@ Cubs	3–0	Cueto (1–1)	Lilly (2–1)	Cordero (6)	38,738	8–6
15	April 23	@ Cubs	7–1	Harang (2–2)	Zambrano (1–1)		40,039	9–6
16	April 24	Braves	4–3	Vázquez (2–1)	Vólquez (2–2)	González (2)	30,060	9–7
17	April 25	Braves	10–2	Lowe (2–1)	Arroyo (3–1)		33,015	9–8
18	April 26	Braves	8–2	Owings (1–2)	Kawakami (1–3)		29,327	10–8
19	April 27	Astros	4–1	Sampson (2–0)	Cordero (0–1)		12,365	10–9
20	April 28	Astros	8–3	Rodríguez (2–2)	Harang (2–3)		9,878	10–10
21	April 29	Astros	3–0	Vólquez (3–2)	Paulino (0–2)	Cordero (7)	12,681	11–10

May (15–13)

#	Date	Opponent	Score	Win	Loss	Save	Attendance	Record
22	May 1	@ Pirates	4–0	Arroyo (4–1)	Duke (3–2)		14,238	12–10
23	May 2	@ Pirates	8–6	Ohlendorf (3–2)	Owings (1–3)		22,891	12–11
24	May 3	@ Pirates	5–0	Cueto (2–1)	Karstens (1–1)		13,670	13–11
25	May 4	@ Marlins	3 – 2 (14)	Badenhop (2–1)	Herrera (0–1)		10,825	13–12
26	May 5	@ Marlins	7–0	Vólquez (4–2)	Volstad (2–1)		11,087	14–12
27	May 6	Brewers	15–3	Parra (1–4)	Arroyo (4–2)		10,982	14–13
28	May 7	Brewers	6–5	Owings (2–3)	Looper (2–2)	Cordero (8)	14,724	15–13
29	May 8	Cardinals	6–4	Cueto (3–1)	Piñeiro (4–2)	Cordero (9)	18,016	16–13
30	May 9	Cardinals	8–3	Harang (3–3)	Lohse (3–2)		40,651	17–13
31	May 10	Cardinals	8 – 7 (10)	Franklin (1–0)	Cordero (0–2)	Pérez (1)	27,664	17–14
32	May 11	@ Diamondbacks	13–5	Arroyo (5–2)	Garland (3–2)		17,640	18–14
33	May 12	@ Diamondbacks	3–1	Owings (3–3)	Haren (3–4)	Cordero (10)	24,835	19–14
34	May 13	@ Diamondbacks	10–3	Cueto (4–1)	Augenstein (0–1)		20,443	20–14
35	May 15	@ Padres	5–3	Correia (1–2)	Harang (3–4)	Bell (9)	27,021	20–15
36	May 16	@ Padres	6 – 5 (16)	Perdomo (1–0)	Owings (3–4)		31,001	20–16
37	May 17	@ Padres	3–1	Peavy (3–5)	Arroyo (5–3)		21,123	20–17
38	May 19	Phillies	4–3	Hamels (2–2)	Cueto (4–2)	Lidge (8)	18,449	20–18
39	May 20	Phillies	5–1	Harang (4–4)	Moyer (3–4)		15,661	21–18
40	May 21	Phillies	12–5	Blanton (2–3)	Owings (3–5)		25,901	21–19
41	May 22	Indians	3–1	Arroyo (6–3)	Laffey (3–1)	Cordero (11)	28,019	22–19
42	May 23	Indians	7–6	Vizcaíno (1–1)	Weathers (0–1)	Wood (7)	35,821	22–20
43	May 24	Indians	4 – 3 (11)	Fisher (1–0)	Vizcaíno (1–2)		27,796	23–20
44	May 25	Astros	8–5	Harang (5–4)	Rodríguez (5–3)	Cordero (12)	17,818	24–20
45	May 26	Astros	6–4	Masset (2–0)	Byrdak (1–1)	Cordero (13)	15,619	25–20
46	May 27	Astros	6–1	Arroyo (7–3)	Paulino (0–4)		17,602	26–20
47	May 29	@ Brewers	3–2	Looper (5–3)	Cueto (4–3)	Hoffman (12)	42,186	26–21
48	May 30	@ Brewers	9–5	McClung (2–1)	Harang (5–5)		44,172	26–22
49	May 31	@ Brewers	5–2	Gallardo (5–2)	Owings (3–6)	Hoffman (13)	44,594	26–23

June (11–15)

#	Date	Opponent	Score	Win	Loss	Save	Attendance	Record
50	June 1	@ Cardinals	5–3	Lincoln (1–0)	Wellemeyer (5–5)	Cordero (14)	35,815	27–23
51	June 2	@ Cardinals	5–2	Motte (2–1)	Arroyo (7–4)	Franklin (13)	35,507	27–24
52	June 3	@ Cardinals	9–3	Cueto (5–3)	Lohse (4–4)		35,811	28–24
53	June 4	@ Cardinals	3–1	Carpenter (4–0)	Harang (5–6)		39,249	28–25
54	June 5	Cubs	2–1	Zambrano (4–2)	Owings (3–7)	Gregg (10)	32,374	28–26
55	June 6	Cubs	4 – 3 (11)	Masset (3–0)	Marshall (3–5)		40,914	29–26
56	June 7	Cubs	6 – 3 (14)	Patton (2–1)	Lincoln (1–1)	Guzmán (1)	32,629	29–27
57	June 9	@ Nationals	3–2	Cueto (6–3)	Detwiler (0–3)	Cordero (15)	16,274	30–27
58	June 10	@ Nationals	4 – 2 (12)	Masset (4–0)	Villone (3–1)	Weathers (1)	19,790	31–27
59	June 11	@ Nationals	3–2	Tavárez (2–4)	Herrera (0–2)	Beimel (1)	19,703	31–28
60	June 12	@ Royals	4–1	Hochevar (2–2)	Maloney (0–1)		32,959	31–29
61	June 13	@ Royals	7–4	Davies (3–6)	Arroyo (7–5)		29,574	31–30
62	June 14	@ Royals	7–1	Bannister (5–3)	Cueto (6–4)		24,525	31–31
63	June 16	Braves	7–2	Herrera (1–2)	Jurrjens (5–5)		19,127	32–31
64	June 17	Braves	4–3	Owings (4–7)	Vázquez (4–6)	Cordero (16)	27,455	33–31
65	June 18	Braves	7–0	Hanson (2–0)	Maloney (0–2)		24,657	33–32
66	June 19	White Sox	4–3	Arroyo (8–5)	Contreras (2–6)	Cordero (17)	28,395	34–32
67	June 20	White Sox	10–8	Carrasco (2–0)	Herrera (1–3)	Jenks (16)	42,234	34–33
68	June 21	White Sox	4–1	Buehrle (7–2)	Harang (5–7)	Jenks (17)	32,786	34–34
69	June 23	@ Blue Jays	7–5	Tallet (5–4)	Owings (4–8)	Frasor (2)	30,351	34–35
70	June 24	@ Blue Jays	8–2	Richmond (6–4)	Arroyo (8–6)		15,409	34–36
71	June 25	@ Blue Jays	7–5	Cueto (7–4)	Camp (0–3)	Cordero (18)	15,329	35–36
72	June 26	@ Indians	9–2	Sowers (2–5)	Harang (5–8)		28,114	35–37
73	June 27	@ Indians	7–3	Bailey (1–0)	Ohka (0–2)		28,646	36–37
74	June 28	@ Indians	8–1	Owings (5–8)	Huff (3–3)		23,900	37–37
75	June 30	Diamondbacks	6–2	Haren (7–5)	Arroyo (8–7)		22,725	37–38

July (8–19)

#	Date	Opponent	Score	Win	Loss	Save	Attendance	Record
76	July 1	Diamondbacks	1–0	Cueto (8–4)	Garland (4–8)	Cordero (19)	20,374	38–38
77	July 2	Diamondbacks	3–2	Cordero (1–2)	Zavada (1–2)		19,592	39–38
78	July 3	Cardinals	7–4	Motte (3–2)	Herrera (1–4)	Franklin (20)	41,349	39–39
79	July 4	Cardinals	5–2	Owings (6–8)	Thompson (2–5)	Cordero (20)	37,371	40–39
80	July 5	Cardinals	10–1	Carpenter (6–3)	Arroyo (8–8)		24,017	40–40
81	July 6	@ Phillies	22–1	Hamels (5–5)	Cueto (8–5)		41,548	40–41
82	July 7	@ Phillies	4–3	Weathers (1–1)	Lidge (0–4)	Cordero (21)	43,623	41–41
83	July 8	@ Phillies	3–2	Madson (3–4)	Weathers (1–2)		44,179	41–42
84	July 9	@ Phillies	9–6	Moyer (8–6)	Owings (6–9)	Lidge (17)	45,146	41–43
85	July 10	@ Mets	3–0	Arroyo (9–8)	Nieve (3–3)		39,203	42–43
86	July 11	@ Mets	4–0	Santana(10–7)	Cueto (8–6)		39,396	42–43
87	July 12	@ Mets	9–7	Pelfrey (7–4)	Harang (5–9)		40,014	42–44
88	July 16	Brewers	9–6	Looper (8–4)	Bailey (1–1)	Hoffman (21)	23,279	42–45
89	July 17	Brewers	4–0	Arroyo (10–8)	Suppan (5–7)		25,687	43–45
90	July 18	Brewers	5–1	Parra (4–8)	Harang (5–10)		40,524	43–46
91	July 19	Brewers	5–3	Weathers (2–2)	McClung (3–3)	Cordero (22)	24,924	44–46
92	July 20	@ Dodgers	7–5	Schmidt (1–0)	Owings (6–10)	Broxton (23)	43,110	44–47
93	July 21	@ Dodgers	12–3	Wolf (5–4)	Bailey (1–2)		49,027	44–48
94	July 22	@ Dodgers	6–2	Billingsley (10–5)	Arroyo (10–9)		56,000	44–49
95	July 24	@ Cubs	8–5	Wells (6–4)	Harang (5–11)		41,406	44–50
96	July 25	@ Cubs	5–3	Hart (2–1)	Cueto (8–7)	Gregg (20)	41,264	44–51
97	July 26	@ Cubs	5–2	Harden (7–6)	Owings (6–11)	Gregg (21)	41,528	44–52
98	July 27	Padres	6–4	Bailey (2–2)	Geer (1–7)	Cordero (23)	18,563	45–52
99	July 28	Padres	3–2	Correia (7–8)	Arroyo (10–10)	Bell (23)	14,526	45–53
100	July 29	Padres	7–1	Latos (2–1)	Harang (5–12)		17,201	45–54
101	July 30	Padres	7–4	Stauffer (1–2)	Cueto (8–8)		19,177	45–55
102	July 31	Rockies	5–3	Morales (2–0)	Weathers (2–3)	Street (27)	22,130	45–56

August (13–16)

#	Date	Opponent	Score	Win	Loss	Save	Attendance	Record
103	August 1	Rockies	6–2	Jiménez (8–9)	Bailey (2–3)		23,452	45–57
104	August 2	Rockies	6 – 4 (11)	Morales (3–0)	Masset (4–1)	Street (28)	31,142	45–58
105	August 3	Cubs	4–2	Wells (8–4)	Harang (5–13)	Mármol (4)	22,222	45–59
106	August 4	Cubs	6–3	Gorzelanny (4–1)	Cueto (8–9)		17,992	45–60
107	August 5	Cubs	4–0	Lehr (1–0)	Harden (7–7)		22,098	46–60
108	August 7	@ Giants	10–5	Weathers (3–3)	Wilson (3–5)		41,744	47–60
109	August 8	@ Giants	4–2	Zito (8–10)	Arroyo (10–11)	Wilson (28)	37,057	47–61
110	August 9	@ Giants	5–2	Harang (6–13)	Cain (12–4)	Cueto (1)	36,705	48–62
111	August 10	@ Cardinals	4–1	Lohse (5–7)	Wells (0–3)	Franklin (27)	40,212	48–63
112	August 11	@ Cardinals	5–4	Lehr (2–0)	Boggs (1–1)	Cordero (25)	40,145	49–63
113	August 12	@ Cardinals	5–2	Carpenter (12–3)	Bailey (2–4)	Franklin (28)	40,328	49–64
114	August 13	Nationals	7–0	Arroyo (11–11)	Balester (1–2)		16,889	50–64
115	August 14	Nationals	2–0	Mock (2–4)	Harang (6–14)	MacDougal (12)	19,606	50–65
116	August 15	Nationals	10–6	Martin (2–2)	Cueto (8–10)		30,494	50–66
117	August 16	Nationals	5–4	Sosa (2–1)	Rhodes (0–1)	MacDougal (13)	18,030	50–67
118	August 18	Giants	8 – 5 (10)	Howry (1–5)	Cordero (1–3)	Wilson (29)	13,334	50–68
119	August 19	Giants	1–0	Romo (4–2)	Arroyo (11–12)	Wilson (30)	11,302	50–69
120	August 20	Giants	2 – 1 (10)	Cordero (2–3)	Howry (1–6)		13,390	51–69
121	August 21	@ Pirates	5–2	Morton (3–6)	Owings (6–12)	Capps (23)	22,725	51–70
122	August 22	@ Pirates	12–2	Duke (10–11)	Lehr (2–1)		32,570	51–71
123	August 23	@ Pirates	4–1	Bailey (3–4)	Hart (4–3)	Cordero (26)	21,209	52–71
124	August 25	@ Brewers	8–6	Herrera (2–4)	Coffey (4–3)		29,481	53–71
125	August 26	@ Brewers	4–3	Herrera (3–4)	Burns (3–5)	Cordero (27)	35,084	54–71
126	August 27	@ Brewers	8–5	Lehr (3–1)	Bush (3–5)	Cordero (28)	31,091	55–71
127	August 28	Dodgers	4–2	Bailey (4–4)	Billingsley (12–8)		19,258	56–71
128	August 29	Dodgers	11–4	Weaver (6–4)	Maloney (0–3)		25,744	56–72
129	August 30	Dodgers	3 – 2 (12)	McDonald (4–3)	Cordero (2–4)	Broxton (29)	26,091	56–73
130	August 31	Pirates	4–3	Masset (5–1)	Chavez (0–4)		13,051	57–73
131	August 31	Pirates	6–3	Cueto (9–10)	Maholm (7–8)	Cordero (29)	9,087	58–73

September (18–9)

#	Date	Opponent	Score	Win	Loss	Save	Attendance	Record
132	September 1	Pirates	11–5	Lehr (4–1)	Morton (3–7)	Owings (1)	10,304	59–73
133	September 2	Pirates	5–3	Bailey (5–4)	Duke (10–13)	Cordero (30)	11,541	60–73
134	September 4	@ Braves	3–1	Arroyo (12–12)	Lowe (13–9)		24,219	61–73
135	September 5	@ Braves	3–1	Wells (1–3)	Jurrjens (10–10)		29,078	62–73
136	September 6	@ Braves	4–2	Owings (7–12)	Kawakami (7–11)		32,397	63–73
137	September 7	@ Rockies	4–3	Betancourt (3–3)	Fisher (1–1)	Morales (4)	40,357	63–74
138	September 8	@ Rockies	3–1	Marquis (15–10)	Maloney (0–4)	Morales (5)	23,154	63–75
139	September 9	@ Rockies	4–3	Daley (1–1)	Cordero (2–5)		23,721	63–76
140	September 10	@ Rockies	5–1	Rincón (4–2)	Wells (1–4)		24,175	63–77
141	September 11	@ Cubs	6–4	Stevens (1–0)	Lehr (4–2)	Mármol (12)	39,881	63–78
142	September 12	@ Cubs	7–5	Rhodes (1–1)	Mármol (2–3)	Cordero (34)	40,351	64–78
143	September 13	@ Cubs	5–2	Lilly (12–8)	Bailey (5–5)		39,805	64–79
144	September 14	Astros	3–1	Arroyo (13–12)	Rodríguez (13–9)	Cordero (36)	9,852	65–79
145	September 15	Astros	5–4	Herrera (4–4)	Gervacio (1–1)	Cordero (36)	11,923	66–79
146	September 16	Astros	6–5	Burton (1–0)	Wright (3–3)	Cordero (37)	10,662	67–79
147	September 17	Marlins	3–2	Maloney (1–4)	Sánchez (2–7)	Cordero (38)	9,685	68–79
148	September 18	Marlins	4–3	Donnelly (3–0)	Cordero (2–6)	Núñez (23)	15,882	68–80
149	September 19	Marlins	3–2	Nolasco (12–9)	Arroyo (13–13)	Lindstrom (15)	17,026	68–81
150	September 20	Marlins	8–1	Wells (8–6)	West (2–4)		16,186	69–81
151	September 22	@ Pirates	10–4	Cueto (10–10)	Duke (10–15)		16,492	70–81
152	September 23	@ Pirates	12–2	Bailey (6–5)	Hart (4–8)		15,980	71–81
153	September 24	@ Pirates	4–1	Arroyo (14–13)	Morton (4–9)	Cordero (39)	15,892	72–81
154	September 25	@ Astros	10–4	Maloney (2–4)	Moehler (8–11)		37,710	73–81
155	September 26	@ Astros	10–4	Lehr (5–2)	Paulino (2–11)		39,476	74–81
156	September 27	@ Astros	3–2	Rodríguez (14–11)	Cueto (10–11)	Valverde (25)	37,595	74–82
157	September 29	Cardinals	7–2	Bailey (7-5)	Piñeiro (15-12)		12,026	75–82
158	September 30	Cardinals	6–1	Arroyo (15-13)	Smoltz (3-8)		11,930	76–82

October (2–2)

#	Date	Opponent	Score	Win	Loss	Save	Attendance	Record
159	October 1	Cardinals	13–0	Carpenter (17-4)	Wells (2-5)		11,861	76–83
160	October 2	Pirates	3–1	McCutchen (1-2)	Lehr (5–3)	Capps (27)	16,288	76–84
161	October 3	Pirates	8–4	Cueto (11–11)	Duke (11–16)		24,539	77–84
162	October 4	Pirates	6–0	Bailey (8-5)	Karstens (4–6)		20,940	78–84

Please do not edit this line: OgreBot End-->

=== Roster ===
2009 Cincinnati Reds
Roster
Pitchers: 61 Bronson Arroyo; 34 Homer Bailey; 51 Jared Burton; 48 Francisco Cordero; 47 Johnny Cueto; 46 Carlos Fisher; 39 Aaron Harang; 52 Daniel Ray Herrera; 62 Justin Lehr; 57 Mike Lincoln; 56 Matt Maloney; 60 Robert Manuel; 40 Nick Masset; 33 Micah Owings; 58 Ramón Ramírez; 53 Arthur Rhodes; 37 Josh Roenicke; 50 Pedro Viola; 36 Edinson Vólquez; 25 David Weathers; 38 Kip Wells	Catchers: 29 Ryan Hanigan; 55 Ramón Hernández; 37 Corky Miller; 30 Craig Tatum; Infielders: 60 Kevin Barker; 28 Edwin Encarnación; 64 Juan Francisco; 2 Álex González; 15 Jerry Hairston Jr.; 7 Paul Janish; 4 Brandon Phillips; 9 Danny Richar; 27 Scott Rolen; 23 Adam Rosales; 15 Drew Sutton; 19 Joey Votto	Outfielders: 28 Wladimir Balentien; 32 Jay Bruce; 21 Chris Dickerson; 31 Jonny Gomes; 16 Darnell McDonald; 17 Laynce Nix; 6 Drew Stubbs; 3 Willy Taveras; Other batters: 26 Wilkin Castillo	Manager: 12 Dusty Baker; Coaches: 41 Mark Berry (third base); 22 Billy Hatcher (first base); 49 Brook Jacoby (hitting); 59 Juan López (bullpen); 43 Dick Pole (pitching); 35 Chris Speier (bench)

== Player stats ==
=== Batting ===
==== Starters by position ====
Note: Pos = Position; G = Games played; AB = At bats; H = Hits; Avg. = Batting average; HR = Home runs; RBI = Runs batted in

Pos	Player	G	AB	H	Avg.	HR	RBI
C	Ryan Hanigan	90	251	66	.263	3	11
1B	Joey Votto	131	469	151	.322	25	84
2B	Brandon Phillips	153	584	161	.276	20	98
SS	Paul Janish	90	256	54	.211	1	16
3B	Adam Rosales	87	230	49	.213	4	19
LF	Laynce Nix	116	309	74	.239	15	46
CF	Willy Taveras	102	404	97	.240	1	15
RF	Jay Bruce	101	345	77	.223	22	58

Through the end of the 2009 season.

==== Other batters ====
Note: G = Games played; AB = At bats; H = Hits; Avg. = Batting average; HR = Home runs; RBI = Runs batted in

Player	G	AB	H	Avg.	HR	RBI
Jerry Hairston Jr.	86	307	78	.254	8	27
Ramón Hernández	81	287	74	.258	5	37
Jonny Gomes	98	281	75	.267	20	51
Chris Dickerson	97	255	70	.275	2	15
Álex González	68	243	51	.210	3	26
Drew Stubbs	42	180	48	.267	8	17
Edwin Encarnación	43	139	29	.209	5	16
Scott Rolen	40	137	37	.270	3	24
Wladimir Balentien	40	110	29	.264	3	11
Darnell McDonald	47	105	28	.267	2	10
Craig Tatum	26	68	11	.162	1	6
Drew Sutton	42	66	14	.212	1	9
Corky Miller	21	56	10	.179	1	10
Kevin Barker	29	32	9	.281	0	3
Juan Francisco	14	21	9	.429	1	7
Danny Richar	7	8	2	.250	0	0
Wilkin Castillo	4	3	2	.667	0	1

Through the end of the 2009 season.

=== Pitching ===
==== Starting pitchers ====
Note: G = Games pitched; IP = Innings pitched; W = Wins; L = Losses; ERA = Earned run average; SO = Strikeouts; WHIP = (Walks+hits) per inning pitched

Player	G	IP	W	L	ERA	SO	WHIP
Bronson Arroyo	33	220.1	15	13	3.84	127	1.27
Johnny Cueto	30	171.1	11	11	4.41	132	1.36
Aaron Harang	26	162.1	6	14	4.21	142	1.41
Micah Owings	26	119.2	7	12	5.34	68	1.59
Homer Bailey	20	113.1	8	5	4.53	86	1.47
Justin Lehr	11	65.1	5	3	5.37	33	1.53
Edinson Volquez	9	49.2	4	2	4.35	47	1.33
Kip Wells	10	46.1	2	3	4.66	25	1.27
Matt Maloney	7	40.2	2	4	4.87	28	1.25

Through the end of the 2009 season.

==== Relief pitchers ====
Note: G = Games pitched; W = Wins; L = Losses; L = Losses; SV = Saves; IP = Innings pitched; ERA = Earned run average; SO = Strikeouts; WHIP = (Walks+hits) per inning pitched

Player	G	W	L	SV	IP	ERA	SO	WHIP
Francisco Cordero	68	2	6	39	66.2	2.16	58	1.32
Nick Masset	74	5	1	0	76.0	2.37	70	1.03
Danny Herrera	70	4	4	0	61.2	3.06	44	1.41
Arthur Rhodes	66	1	1	0	53.1	2.53	48	1.07
Jared Burton	53	1	0	0	59.1	4.40	45	1.42
David Weathers	43	3	3	1	38.0	3.32	27	1.16
Carlos Fisher	39	1	1	0	52.1	4.47	48	1.55
Mike Lincoln	19	1	1	0	23.0	8.22	9	2.09
Josh Roenicke	11	0	0	0	13.1	2.70	14	1.28
Ramón Ramírez	11	0	0	0	12.1	3.65	8	0.97
Pedro Viola	9	0	0	0	7.0	5.14	5	1.43
Robert Manuel	3	0	0	0	4.1	0.00	2	1.39
Paul Janish	2	0	0	0	2.0	49.50	3	5.50

Through the end of the 2009 season.

== Farm system ==
Level	Team	League	Manager
AAA	Louisville Bats	International League	Rick Sweet
AA	Carolina Mudcats	Southern League	David Bell
A	Sarasota Reds	Florida State League	Joe Ayrault
A	Dayton Dragons	Midwest League	Todd Benzinger
Rookie	GCL Reds	Gulf Coast League	Pat Kelly
Rookie	Billings Mustangs	Pioneer League	Julio Garcia
