= Chris Dickerson =

Chris Dickerson may refer to:

- Chris Dickerson (bodybuilder) (1939–2021), American bodybuilder
- Chris Dickerson (baseball) (born 1982), American Major League Baseball outfielder
