= Craig Tatum =

American baseball player (born 1983)

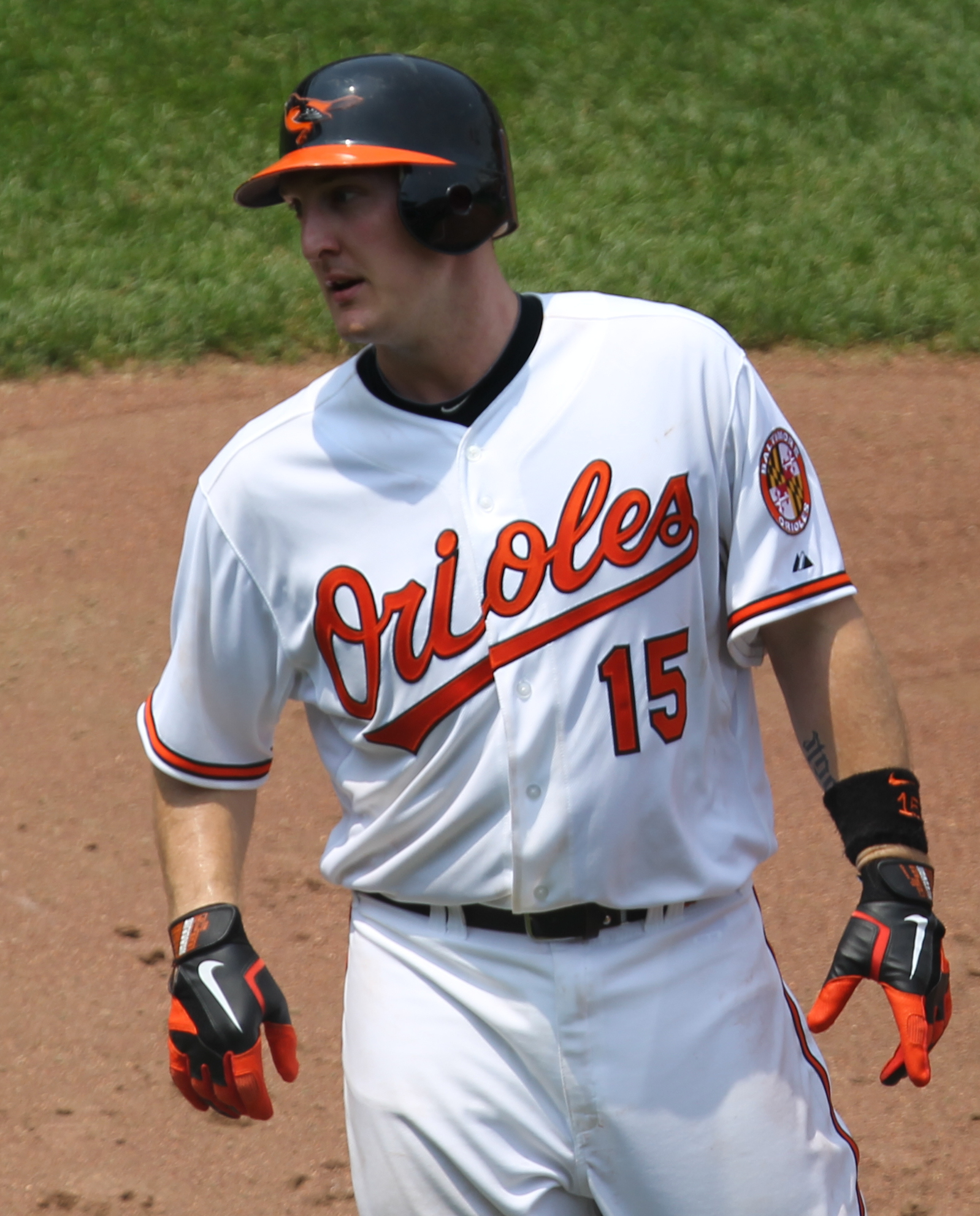
- Tatum with the Orioles in 2011
- Catcher
- Born: March 18, 1983 (age 42); Hattiesburg, Mississippi, U.S.
- Batted: Right Threw: Right

MLB debut
- July 21, 2009, for the Cincinnati Reds

Last MLB appearance
- September 25, 2011, for the Baltimore Orioles

MLB statistics
- Batting average: .223
- Home runs: 1
- Runs batted in: 22
- Stats at Baseball Reference

Teams
- Cincinnati Reds (2009); Baltimore Orioles (2010–2011)

Craig Browning Tatum (born March 18, 1983) is a retired American professional baseball catcher. He played in Major League Baseball for the Cincinnati Reds and Baltimore Orioles from 2009 through 2011.

== Early years ==
Tatum attended Hattiesburg High School where he played baseball as a catcher and pitcher. He was named the Mississippi Gatorade Player of the Year after hitting a team-best .435 with 51 hits and 54 Runs Batted In. He had a 7-3 pitching record with a save and a 3.94 earned run average and 80 strikeouts

== College career ==
Tatum attended Mississippi State University, where he played for the Mississippi State Bulldogs baseball team. In 2002 Tatum was redshirted before be the team's starting catcher. In 2004, Tatum hit .325 with 13 home runs and a team-leading 60 RBI, en route to second-team All-All-SEC honors as a sophomore. He majored in Banking and Finance.

== MLB career ==
=== Cincinnati Reds ===
Tatum was drafted by the Cincinnati Reds in the third round (78th overall) of the 2004 MLB draft.

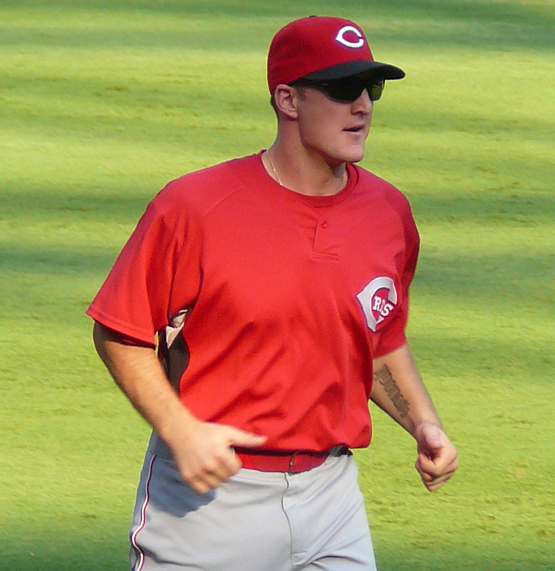
Tatum playing for Cincinnati Reds in 2009

Tatum was called up from the minors from Triple-A Louisville Bats on July 19, 2009, after starting catcher Ramón Hernández had a knee injury. On July 21, 2009, he made his Major League debut against Los Angeles Dodgers, he went 0-2 and was the last player retired in the game. On July 25, Hanigan was scratched from his scheduled start to a stiff neck which allowed Tatum took his first Major League start against the Chicago Cubs. On July 28 against the San Diego Padres, Tatum notched his first Major League hit and first career RBI with a single that scored Laynce Nix On August 29, 2009, Tatum hit his first career home run, a line drive off knuckleballer Charlie Haeger.

=== Baltimore Orioles ===
On November 20, 2009, Tatum was claimed off waivers by the Baltimore Orioles. Making the team out of spring training, he backed up Matt Wieters for the 2010 season. In 2011 Tatum did not make the team out of spring training but was called up after catcher Jake Fox was designated for assignment on June 1. He has backed up Wieters the rest of the season.

=== Arizona Diamondbacks ===
Tatum was claimed off waivers by the Houston Astros on October 28, 2011. After being designated for assignment by the Astros, he was claimed off waivers by the Arizona Diamondbacks on January 23, 2012.

=== New York Yankees ===
On March 28, 2012, Tatum was claimed off waivers by the New York Yankees.

=== Retirement ===
On February 13, 2013, after the Marlins rescinded Tatum's minor-league deal, Tatum announced his retirement from Major League Baseball.

== Personal life ==
He is married to Daniele Rocconi.
