= Norris Hopper =

American baseball player (born 1979)

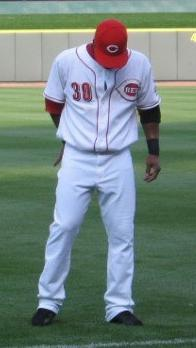
- Hopper with the Cincinnati Reds
- Outfielder
- Born: March 24, 1979 (age 46); Shelby, North Carolina, U.S.
- Batted: Right Threw: Right

MLB debut
- August 20, 2006, for the Cincinnati Reds

Last MLB appearance
- July 1, 2008, for the Cincinnati Reds

MLB statistics
- Batting average: .316
- Home runs: 1
- Runs batted in: 20
- Stolen bases: 17
- Stats at Baseball Reference

Teams
- Cincinnati Reds (2006–2008)

Norris Stephen Hopper (born March 24, 1979) is an American former professional baseball outfielder who played three seasons of Major League Baseball (MLB) for the Cincinnati Reds. Drafted by the Kansas City Royals in the eighth round of the 1998 Major League Baseball draft, Hopper made his MLB debut on August 20, 2006, with the Cincinnati Reds. He has a major league career .316 batting average with 125 hits, 15 doubles, two triples, one home run, 20 runs batted in, and 17 stolen bases.

At 5 feet 11 inches (1.80 m) and 205 pounds (93 kg), Hopper played all three outfield positions for the Reds. A skilled defender, he recorded just one error in his career, finishing with a .996 fielding percentage. Though he lacked power as a hitter, he was adept at hitting for contact, allowing him to utilize his speed and athleticism to beat out singles and bunt for base hits.

Hopper spent 13 seasons of his professional career in Minor League Baseball (MiLB). He has a minor league career .289 batting average with 1,237 hits, 119 doubles, 32 triples, three home runs, 368 runs batted in, and 237 stolen bases.

== Early life ==
Born in Shelby, NC, Hopper attended Shelby High School, where he played shortstop and started at quarterback for the school's football team.

Considered among the top high school football players in North Carolina, he was selected to play in the 1997 Shrine Bowl of the Carolinas; one of his teammates was future NFL defensive end Julius Peppers.

== Professional career ==
=== Kansas City Royals (1998-2004) ===
Hopper signed with the Kansas City Royals in 1998, spending seven seasons with the organization, all in the minor leagues. He finished his stint with the Royals organization in Double-A, playing two seasons for the Wichita Wranglers, where he slashed .290/.346/.327 and recorded 80 stolen bases.

Through 655 minor league games with the Royals organization, he slashed .278/.338/.322 with two home runs, 219 runs batted in, and 137 stolen bases.

He was granted free agency on October 15, 2004.

=== Cincinnati Reds (2005-2009) ===
On December 13, 2005, Hopper signed with Cincinnati Reds.

For the 2005 season, he was assigned to the club's Double-A affiliate, the Chattanooga Lookouts, where he slashed .310/.354/.368 with one home run, 37 runs batted in, and 25 stolen bases. In 2006, he spent the majority of the season with the club's Triple-A affiliate, the Louisville Bats. Through 98 games with the Bats, he slashed .347/.378/.392 and recorded 25 stolen bases.

On August 20, 2006, he made his major league debut with the Cincinnati Reds, recording a single in his first major league at-bat. On September 22, 2006, against Rich Hill and the Chicago Cubs, he recorded his first and only major league home run. He appeared in 21 games that season, slashing .359/.435/.462 with one home run, five runs batted in, and two stolen bases.

During the 2007 season, he appeared in 121 games with the Cincinnati Reds, slashing .329/.371/.388 with 101 hits, 14 runs batted in, and 14 stolen bases.

After 2009 spring training, he was assigned to the Triple-A Louisville Bats.

=== Chicago White Sox ===
On June 26, Hopper was traded to the Chicago White Sox for catcher Corky Miller.

=== Washington Nationals ===
On August 6, Hopper was traded to the Washington Nationals organization.

He was granted free agency on November 9, 2009.

=== Milwaukee Brewers ===
On January 14, 2010, he signed a minor league deal with the Milwaukee Brewers. He spent the season with AAA-affiliate Nashville Sounds and filed for free agency after the 2010 season.

=== Somerset Patriots ===
Hopper signed with the Somerset Patriots of the Atlantic League of Professional Baseball for the 2011 season. He played in 79 games for Somerset and carried a .253/.294/.302 batting line to go with 67 hits. He became a free agent after the season.

=== Petroleros de Minatitlan ===
On June 27, 2010, Hopper signed with the Petroleros de Minatitlan of the Mexican League. After playing only 20 games for the club he was released on July 24, 2010.

== Ryan Freel collision ==
On May 28, 2007, center fielder Ryan Freel was catching a fly ball, when his head collided with Hopper's right elbow. The collision resulted in Freel being diagnosed with contusions to his head and neck.

Following the collision, Freel told reporters he had sustained several concussions in his life. On December 22, 2012, Freel died from a self-inflicted gunshot wound. According to his family, he suffered from chronic traumatic encephalopathy (CTE).
