= Daniel Herrera (baseball) =

American baseball player (born 1984)

Daniel Ray Herrera
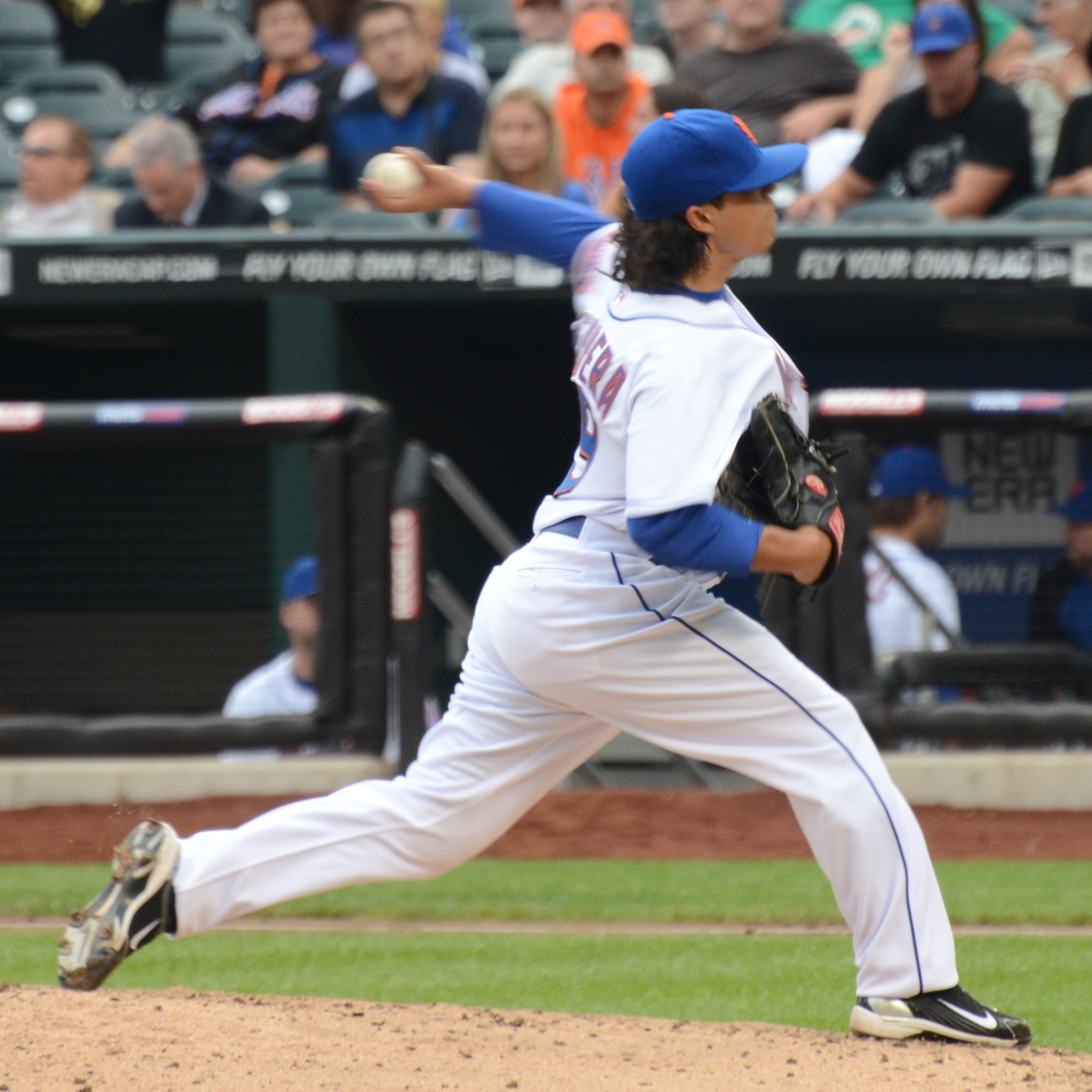
- Herrera with the New York Mets
- Relief pitcher
- Born: October 21, 1984 (age 42); Odessa, Texas, U.S.
- Batted: Left Threw: Left

MLB debut
- June 3, 2008, for the Cincinnati Reds

Last MLB appearance
- September 27, 2011, for the New York Mets

MLB statistics
- Win–loss record: 5–8
- Earned run average: 3.72
- Strikeouts: 71
- Stats at Baseball Reference

Teams
- Cincinnati Reds (2008–2010); Milwaukee Brewers (2011); New York Mets (2011)

Daniel Ray Herrera (born October 21, 1984) is an American former professional baseball pitcher. He played in Major League Baseball (MLB) for the Cincinnati Reds, Milwaukee Brewers, and New York Mets.

Herrera became well known among baseball fans both for his small stature and for his unique pitch repertoire. He was one of the smallest pitchers in recent Major League Baseball history at 5' 6", and one of the few to throw a true screwball.

== Playing career ==
Herrera attended Permian High School in Odessa, Texas. Undrafted out of high school, he attended the University of New Mexico and played for the New Mexico Lobos baseball team. It was in college that Herrera developed his screwball (out of dissatisfaction with his changeup). In 2005, he played summer league baseball for the La Crosse Loggers of the Northwoods League. He was chosen by the Texas Rangers in the 45th round of the 2006 Major League Baseball draft.

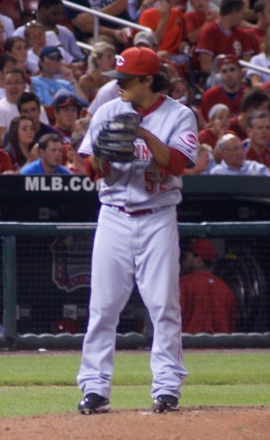
Herrera pitching for the Reds in 2009

=== Cincinnati Reds ===
On December 21, 2007, Herrera was traded by the Rangers along with Edinson Vólquez to the Cincinnati Reds for Josh Hamilton.

He made his Major League debut on June 3, 2008, pitching a scoreless inning. Entering the game with men on base and no outs, he induced Shane Victorino to ground out, and after an intentional walk to Chase Utley he struck out both Ryan Howard and Pat Burrell. Two days after his debut, he was optioned back to the Triple-A Louisville Bats to make room on the roster for starting pitcher Homer Bailey.

He was briefly recalled again on June 10, 2008; however, he was sent down just four days later when pitcher Gary Majewski returned from the bereavement list. He made just one appearance during his second stint, pitching two innings while giving up three runs on four hits, striking out two.

In 2009, Herrera made the Reds out of spring training. He recorded his first victory of his career on June 16, 2009, after relieving Aaron Harang in the top of the third inning following an extended rain delay. He pitched three scoreless innings, giving up two hits while striking out two.

=== Milwaukee Brewers ===
On May 23, 2011, Herrera was claimed off waivers by the Milwaukee Brewers and optioned to the Nashville Sounds. He was designated for assignment on June 17, after making two appearances with Milwaukee.

=== New York Mets ===
On September 1, 2011, Herrera was named as one of the players to be named later that completed a previous July 12 trade for Francisco Rodríguez. On January 9, 2012, the Mets placed Herrera on waivers.

Herrera was optioned to the Triple-A Buffalo Bisons to begin the 2012 season, recording a 1.50 ERA with five strikeouts and one save in three games. On April 20, 2012, it was announced that Herrera would require Tommy John surgery, ending his season.

The Mets released Herrera on March 30, 2013.

=== Long Island Ducks ===
On July 19, 2013, Herrera signed with the Long Island Ducks of the Atlantic League of Professional Baseball. In 23 appearances for the Ducks, he posted a 2–1 record and 5.03 ERA with 14 strikeouts across 19 2/3 innings pitched. Herrera became a free agent following the season.

=== Somerset Patriots ===
In 2014, Herrera signed with the Somerset Patriots of the Atlantic League of Professional Baseball. In 36 appearances (three starts) for Somerset, he logged a 4–0 record and 3.43 ERA with 35 strikeouts across 44 2/3 innings of work. Herrera became a free agent following the season.

=== Camden Riversharks ===
Herrera signed with the Camden Riversharks of the Atlantic League of Professional Baseball for the 2015 season. In 37 appearances (11 starts) for Camden, he registered a 7–4 record and 5.04 ERA with 77 strikeouts across 100 innings pitched. Herrera became a free agent after the season.

=== Long Island Ducks (second stint) ===
In 2016, Herrera returned to the Long Island Ducks of the Atlantic League of Professional Baseball. In eight appearances (six starts) for the Ducks, he posted a 3–1 record and 4.35 ERA with 25 strikeouts across 41 1/3 innings of work. Herrera became a free agent after the season.

== Pitching style ==
Herrera threw six pitches. He had three fastballs — a four-seamer (83–86 mph, topped out at 88), a two-seamer (82–85), and a cutter (81–84) — as well as a curveball (75–78), a changeup (75–77), and a screwball (67–70). Herrera threw all of his pitches to hitters from both sides of the plate, with the exception of the changeup (which was only used against right-handed hitters). The screwball was his most common pitch in 2-strike counts, especially to righties. His most common pitch against left-handers as a whole was his curveball.
