= Pedro Viola =

Dominican baseball player (born 1983)

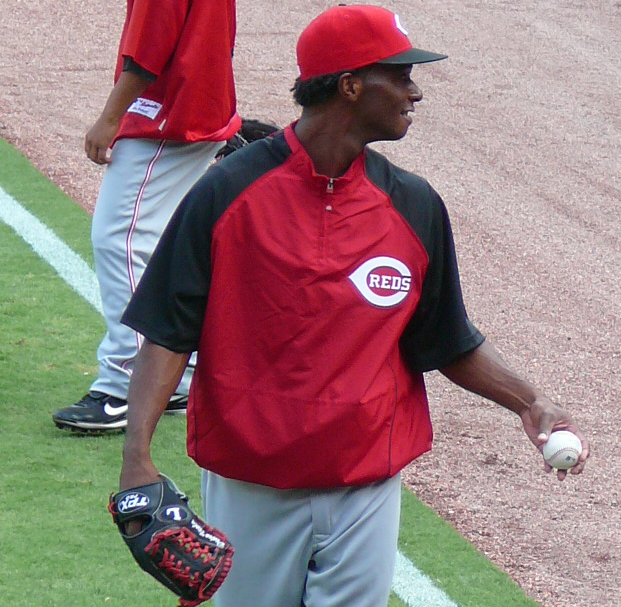
- Viola with the Cincinnati Reds in 2009
- Relief pitcher
- Born: June 29, 1983 (age 42); San Juan, Dominican Republic
- Batted: Right Threw: Left

MLB debut
- September 8, 2009, for the Cincinnati Reds

Last MLB appearance
- July 7, 2011, for the Baltimore Orioles

MLB statistics
- Win–loss record: 0–0
- Earned run average: 7.50
- Strikeouts: 12
- Stats at Baseball Reference

Teams
- Cincinnati Reds (2009); Baltimore Orioles (2010–2011)

Pedro Viola (born June 29, 1983) is a Dominican professional baseball pitcher. He played in Major League Baseball (MLB) for the Cincinnati Reds and Baltimore Orioles. He was called up to MLB on September 2, 2009, after was 2–2 with a 5.47 ERA and converted eight of 11 save chances for the Triple-A Louisville Bats.

== Career ==
=== Cincinnati Reds ===
Viola has played for teams on every minor league level in the Reds organization, some of which have since ended affiliation with the Reds. He played for the DSL Reds, Sarasota Reds, Dayton Dragons and Chattanooga Lookouts before Louisville.

Viola made his MLB debut with the Reds on September 8 at Coors Field against the Colorado Rockies, pitching in the sixth and seventh innings in relief of starter Matt Maloney. He gave up a home run to Eric Young, Jr. to lead off the sixth inning, Young's first career homer. Viola also allowed a Todd Helton single during the inning. He walked and struck out one batter each in the seventh, en route to a 3-1 Rockies victory.

=== Baltimore Orioles ===
On April 21, 2010, Viola was claimed off waivers by the Baltimore Orioles. After joining the organization, he spent most of his time with the Double-A Bowie Baysox. In two appearances for Baltimore, Viola struggled to a 13.50 ERA with three strikeouts across 1 1/3 innings pitched.

Viola made four appearances for Baltimore in 2011, recording a 9.82 ERA with four strikeouts across 3 2/3 innings pitched. Viola was designated for assignment following the acquisition of Taylor Teagarden on December 1, 2011. He cleared waivers and was sent outright to the Triple-A Norfolk Tides on December 5.

Viola made 36 appearances split between Bowie and Norfolk in 2012, accumulating an 0–2 record and 4.75 ERA with 67 strikeouts and four saves across 47 1/3 innings pitched. He elected free agency following the season on November 2, 2012.

=== Oakland Athletics ===
On January 25, 2013, Viola signed a minor league contract with the Oakland Athletics organization. He split the year between the High-A Stockton Ports, Double-A Midland RockHounds, and Triple-A Sacramento River Cats. Viola made 23 appearances for the three affiliates, accumulating a 5–1 record and 4.45 ERA with 43 strikeouts and one save across 30 1/3 innings pitched. He elected free agency following the season on November 4.

== International career ==
He was selected to the Dominican Republic national baseball team at the 2009 World Baseball Classic, 2019 Pan American Games Qualifier and 2019 Pan American Games.
