= Ryan Freel =

American baseball player (1976–2012)

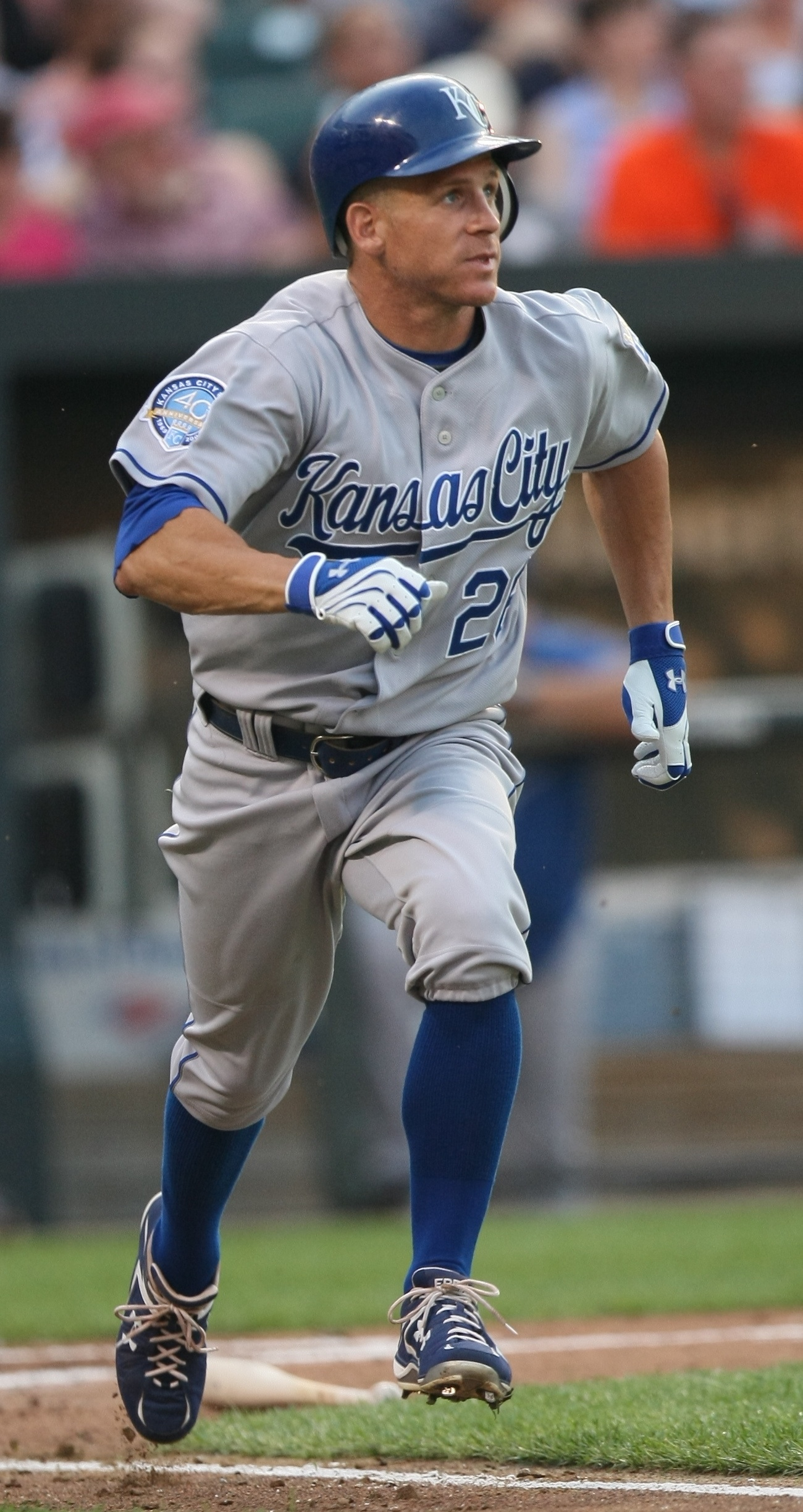
- Freel with the Kansas City Royals in 2009
- Utility player
- Born: March 8, 1976; Jacksonville, Florida, U.S.
- Died: December 22, 2012 (aged 36); Jacksonville, Florida, U.S.
- Batted: Right Threw: Right

MLB debut
- April 4, 2001, for the Toronto Blue Jays

Last MLB appearance
- August 4, 2009, for the Kansas City Royals

MLB statistics
- Batting average: .268
- Home runs: 22
- Runs batted in: 122
- Stolen bases: 143
- Stats at Baseball Reference

Teams
- Toronto Blue Jays (2001); Cincinnati Reds (2003–2008); Baltimore Orioles (2009); Chicago Cubs (2009); Kansas City Royals (2009)
Medals
Men's baseball
Representing United States
World Junior Baseball Championship
Silver medal – second place	1994 Brandon	Team

Ryan Paul Freel (March 8, 1976 – December 22, 2012) was an American professional baseball player. A utility player, Freel played second base, third base, and all three outfield positions in Major League Baseball for the Baltimore Orioles, Chicago Cubs, Cincinnati Reds, Kansas City Royals and Toronto Blue Jays between 2001 and 2009.

On December 22, 2012, Freel committed suicide, and was subsequently the first MLB player to be diagnosed with chronic traumatic encephalopathy.

== Career ==
Freel attended Tallahassee Community College and was selected by the St. Louis Cardinals in the 13th round of the 1994 amateur entry draft, but did not sign. A year later, he was drafted by the Toronto Blue Jays in the 10th round of the 1995 amateur draft. From 1998 to 2002, Freel played in the Venezuelan Baseball League with Cardenales de Lara, becoming Champions in 2001. Freel played 6 seasons in the Toronto minor league system before making his Major League debut on April 4, 2001. He only played in 9 games for the Blue Jays in his rookie year, hitting .273 with 0 home runs, 3 RBI and 2 stolen bases. After the season was over, Freel was granted free agency and signed with the Tampa Bay Devil Rays.

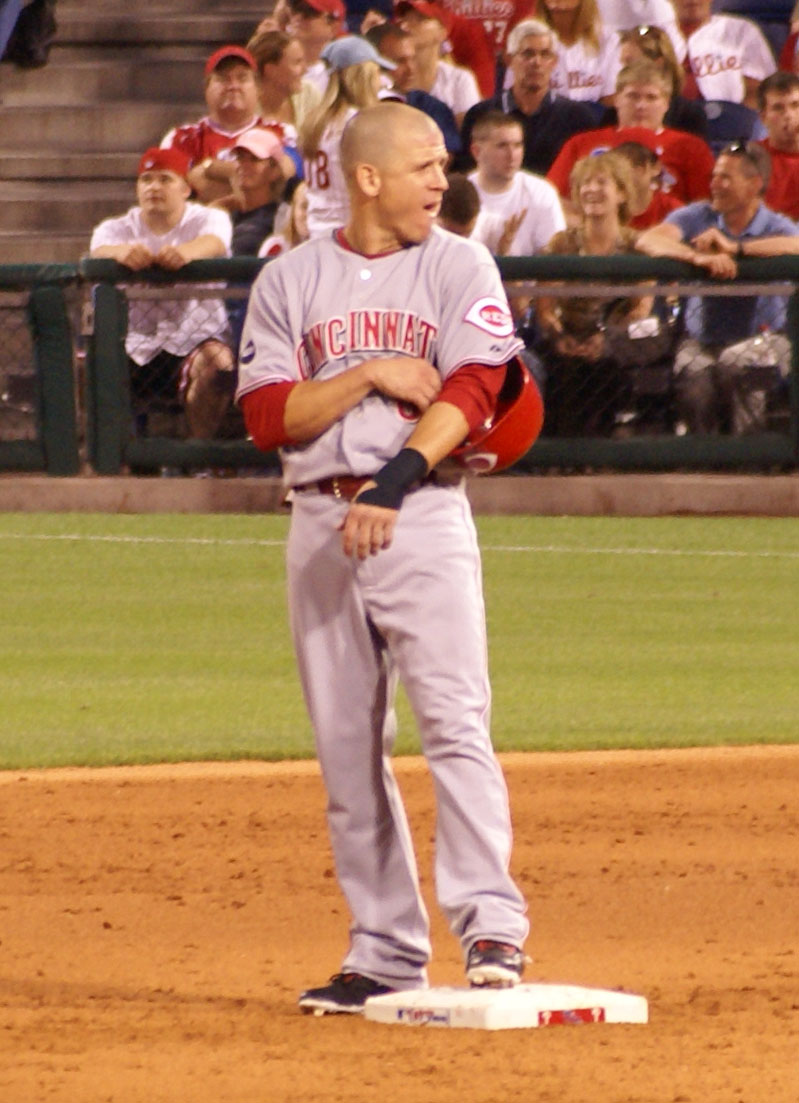
Freel of the Cincinnati Reds on second base in 2007

Freel played the entire 2002 season in the minor leagues with the Durham Bulls, the Triple-A affiliate of the Devil Rays. He hit .261 with 8 home runs, 48 RBI, and 37 steals. On November 18, 2002, he signed with the Cincinnati Reds as a free agent.

On July 27, 2005, Freel stole five bases in one game, becoming the first MLB player to do so since the 2000 season.

In five seasons with the Reds, Freel hit .270 with 22 home runs, 104 runs batted in, and 134 stolen bases. His best season for the Reds was in 2004, when he hit .277 with 3 home runs, 28 RBI, 37 stolen bases, and 74 runs scored in 143 games. In 2007, Freel signed a two-year, $3 million contract extension with the Reds.

On December 9, 2008, Freel was traded along with two minor leaguers including Justin Turner to the Baltimore Orioles for catcher Ramón Hernández. On May 8, 2009, Freel was traded once again, this time to the Chicago Cubs for outfielder Joey Gathright and cash considerations. On July 2, 2009, Freel was designated for assignment to create roster space for the newly acquired Jeff Baker. On July 6, 2009, Freel was dealt accompanied by cash considerations to the Kansas City Royals for a player to be named later.

On August 5, 2009, Freel was designated for assignment by the Kansas City Royals. He was released on August 13, 2009. On August 28, 2009, Freel signed a minor league deal with the Texas Rangers. He was released 2 days later. In April 2010, Freel signed with the independent Somerset Patriots, but retired five weeks later on May 17, 2010.

== Personal life ==
During his stay with the Reds, he was instrumental in helping develop their famous Reds Rookie Success League. He served as the Players Ambassador to that Rookie League for the Reds. The Reds recognized Ryan in July 2013 by annually awarding the "Ryan Freel Heart and Hustle Award" to a member of each league.

Post retirement, Freel founded Big League Development Baseball Inc (BLD) and went on to coach the 11U team to Cooperstown. All teams under his management 9U to 11U had winning seasons.

== Injuries ==
On May 28, 2007, Freel was injured in a game against the Pittsburgh Pirates when chasing a deep drive to right-center field. Freel and right fielder Norris Hopper collided, resulting in Freel's head and neck hitting Hopper and finally the warning track. He was transported by ambulance to Good Samaritan Hospital, where he was reported to be coherent with feeling in his extremities. Freel began working out on June 15, about 2 weeks after the collision. He was briefly sent to the AAA Louisville Bats for rehabilitation. Freel began getting random headaches and pains in his head, which delayed his return for another 2 weeks. On July 3, 2007, 1 month and 5 days after the accident, Freel returned to play for the Cincinnati Reds and was healthy until being placed on the 15-day DL with torn cartilage in his right knee on August 7.

In 2009 with the Baltimore Orioles, he was hit in the head by a pickoff throw while on second base. He was put on the disabled list after the injury, and officially retired a year later.

== Off-the-field issues ==
Freel was twice arrested, once for driving under the influence and the other for disorderly intoxication. He paid a fine after the first incident, and charges were dropped for the second.

=== Farney ===
Freel gained some notoriety in August 2006 when The Dayton Daily News reported that Freel talked to an imaginary voice in his head named Farney. Said Freel: "He's a little guy who lives in my head who talks to me and I talk to him. That little midget in my head said, 'That was a great catch, Ryan,' I said, 'Hey, Farney, I don't know if that was you who really caught that ball, but that was pretty good if it was.' Everybody thinks I talk to myself, so I tell 'em I'm talking to Farney." Freel later said that Farney's name arose from a conversation with Reds trainer Mark Mann: "He actually made a comment like, 'How are the voices in your head?' We'd play around and finally this year he said, 'What's the guy's name?' I said, 'Let's call him Farney.' So now everybody's like, 'Run, Farney, run' or 'Let Farney hit today. You're not hitting very well.'"

== Death ==
On December 22, 2012, Freel died at his home in Jacksonville, Florida, as a result of a self-inflicted gunshot wound. After his death, Freel's family donated his brain to Boston University for research into chronic traumatic encephalopathy (CTE), a degenerative neurological condition associated with repeated head impacts that can only be conclusively diagnosed post-mortem. In December 2013, a post-mortem examination by the Center for the Study of Traumatic Encephalopathy showed that he had had Stage II CTE, making him the first MLB player to have been diagnosed with such a condition. Freel was also diagnosed with various mental illnesses such as bipolar disorder, adult ADHD, depression, impulse control disorder, and anxiety. Additional mental illnesses are consistent with many athletes who also had CTE once their playing careers are finished.
