= Corky Miller =

American baseball player (born 1976)

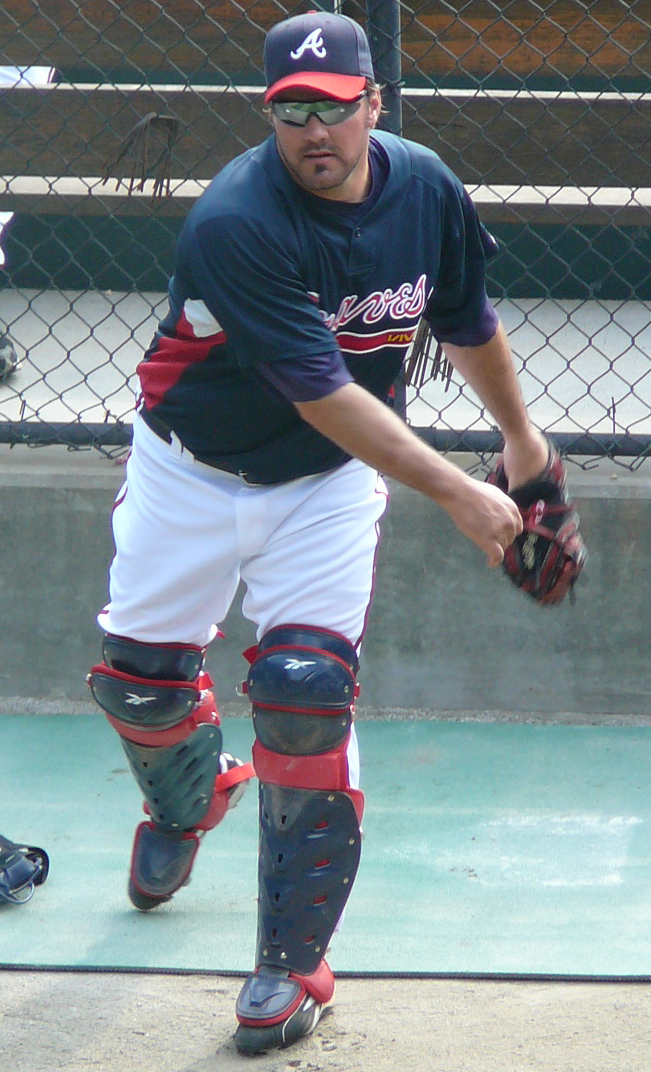
- Miller with the Braves in 2008
- Catcher
- Born: March 18, 1976 (age 50); Corbin City, New Jersey, U.S.
- Batted: Right Threw: Right

MLB debut
- September 4, 2001, for the Cincinnati Reds

Last MLB appearance
- September 29, 2013, for the Cincinnati Reds

MLB statistics
- Batting average: .205
- Home runs: 11
- Runs batted in: 67
- Stats at Baseball Reference

Teams
- Cincinnati Reds (2001–2004); Minnesota Twins (2005); Boston Red Sox (2006); Atlanta Braves (2007–2008); Chicago White Sox (2009); Cincinnati Reds (2009–2010, 2013)

Corky Abraham Phillip Miller (born March 18, 1976) is an American former professional baseball catcher who played parts of 11 seasons in Major League Baseball (MLB). He currently coaches the Dayton Dragons, the A-affiliate of the Cincinnati Reds. He played in MLB from 2001 to 2013 for the Cincinnati Reds, Minnesota Twins, Boston Red Sox, Atlanta Braves, and Chicago White Sox.

Miller never played in more than 39 games in a major league season. He played 17 seasons in the minor leagues, batting a cumulative .193 whilst in the majors and .248 in the minors. He played in a franchise-record ten seasons with the Louisville Bats, the AAA-affiliate of the Cincinnati Reds from 2001 to 2004, then again from 2009 to 2014, and is currently the Louisville franchise's all-time leader in games played with 548.

== High school career ==
Miller was a star baseball and football player at Yucaipa High School in Yucaipa, California. His accolades include first-team All-State and All-CIF (California Interscholastic Federation) honors while leading the T-Birds to the CIF titles in 1993 and 1994. He was also first-team All-CIF in football. He was inducted into the Yucaipa High School Hall of Fame in 2009.

== College career ==
After high school, Miller was drafted by the California Angels in the 23rd round (629th overall) of the 1994 Major League Baseball draft, but he did not sign, opting to attend the University of Nevada, Reno. Miller was a career .356 hitter in his two seasons for the Wolf Pack (1997 and 1998). Miller led the team in hitting in 1998 with a .377 batting average. His on-base percentages in two seasons were .470 in 1997 and .514 in 1998. He owns the school's single-season record for getting hit by a pitch (28 in 1998) and he was hit 54 times in his two seasons.

== Professional career ==
=== First stint with Reds ===
Miller signed with the Cincinnati Reds as an undrafted free agent in 1998. Miller played for the Billings Mustangs, in Billings Montana. He made his Major League debut at age 25 on September 4, 2001, in a 7–1 Reds home loss to the Houston Astros, a game which he started and went hitless in three at-bats. He got his first big-league hit six days later, a single off Tony McKnight in a 3–1 road loss to the Pittsburgh Pirates. Miller remained with the Reds organization through 2004. On September 27, 2001, Miller was credited with stealing home.

=== Minnesota Twins ===
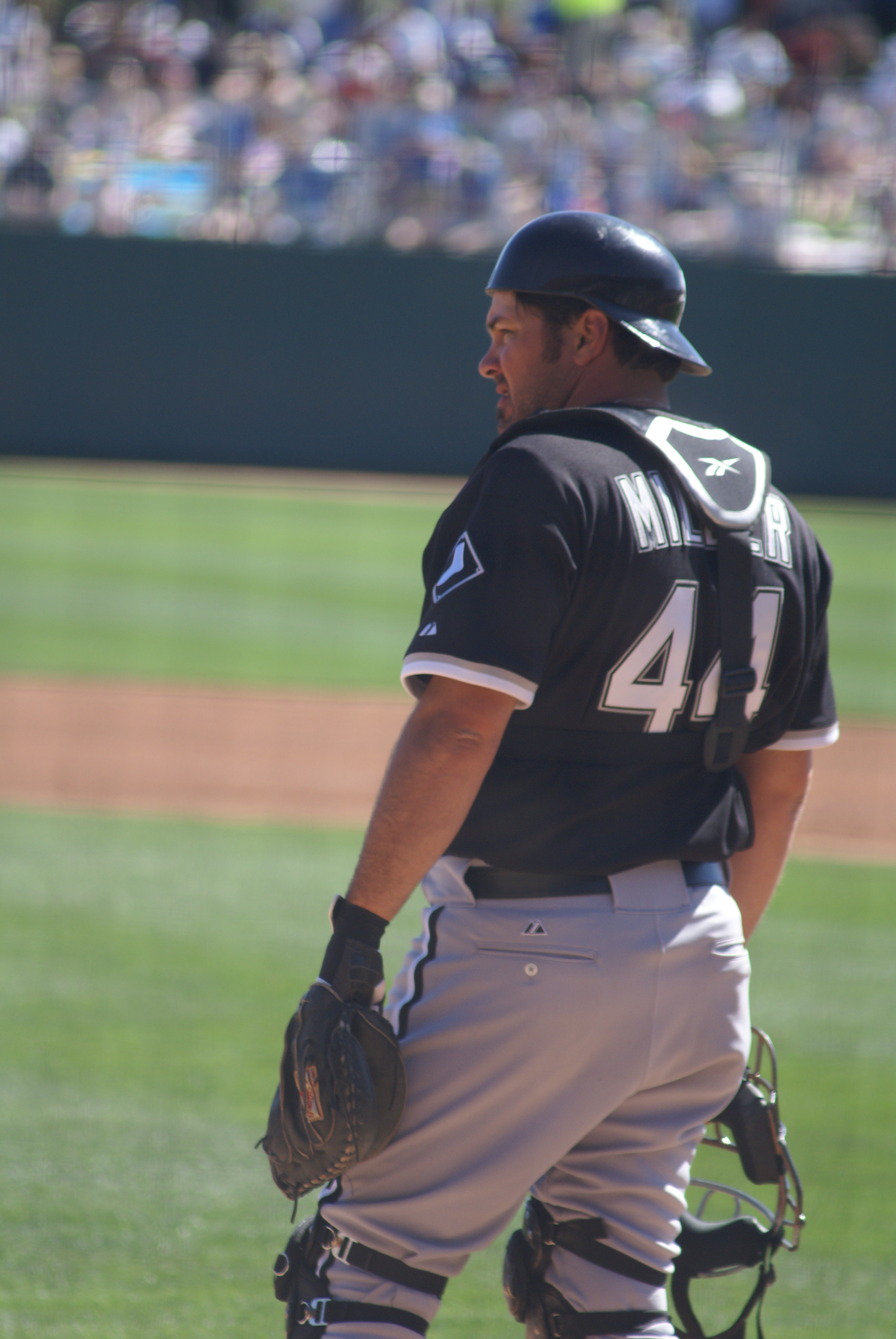
Miller with the White Sox in 2009

Miller played in five games with 12 plate appearances for the Minnesota Twins in 2005. In 2005, he also pitched for the first time in a professional game with the Twins AAA-affiliate the Rochester Red Wings. (He has since pitched a number of times—using a knuckleball—for the Louisville Bats.)

=== Boston Red Sox ===
He was signed by the Boston Red Sox on April 25, 2006, and added to the Pawtucket Red Sox Triple-A roster. Miller was promoted to Boston on August 5, 2006, but his tenure in Boston would not last long. After appearing in just one game (a 7–6 defeat against the Tampa Bay Devil Rays on August 6, 2006), Miller would be designated for assignment on August 14, 2006, to make room for Craig Breslow, who was promoted from Pawtucket.

=== Atlanta Braves ===
Miller was granted free agency after the season and signed a minor league contract with the Atlanta Braves.

On July 31, 2007, the Braves called up Miller to fill up the backup catcher role after previous backup catcher Jarrod Saltalamacchia was traded that day. He made his debut on August 2, hitting a pinch-hit infield single. On August 5, Miller hit a game-tying RBI double, his first extra-base hit since 2002, against the Colorado Rockies. On September 15, Miller hit his first home run since 2002.

On August 1, 2008, Miller was designated for assignment, and was eventually sent outright to the minors. He returned to the Braves' active roster on September 1.

=== Chicago White Sox ===
Miller became a free agent following the 2008 season and signed a minor league contract with the Chicago White Sox.

As a non-roster invitee to White Sox spring training, Miller impressed enough to be awarded the back-up catcher's role to A. J. Pierzynski. In his first regular season game for the White Sox on April 11, 2009 (vs. the Minnesota Twins) Miller went 2–4, with 2 RBI and a run scored. The game resulted in an 8–0 White Sox victory.

=== Subsequent stints with Reds organization ===
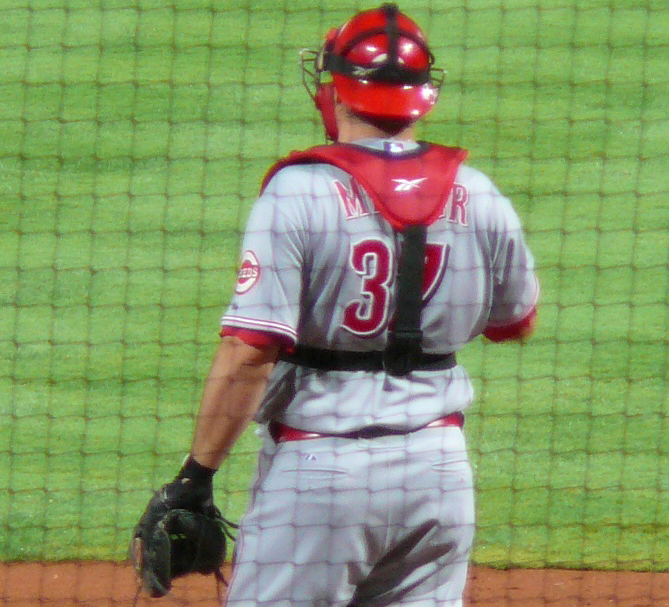
Miller with the Reds in 2009

==== 2009 ====
On June 26, 2009, Miller was traded to the Cincinnati Reds for outfielder Norris Hopper. On August 25, 2009, Miller was called up to the Cincinnati Reds from the Louisville Bats. He became a free agent following the season, but re-signed to a minor league deal.

==== 2010 ====
Miller started the 2010 season not on the Reds 40-man roster, but after the injury of Ryan Hanigan, he was placed on the active roster and took over backup duties to Ramón Hernández. He continued to fill the backup role, now with Hanigan and Hernandez switching spots on the disabled list. His starts came mostly as catcher for the Reds' young arms, such as Travis Wood and Matt Maloney, since he caught them in Louisville. He was outrighted back to Louisville on July 22, 2010, after Hanigan came back from the DL. Miller was called up on September 1. The Reds outrighted him from the roster in the offseason and he refused his assignment, becoming a free agent. They re-signed him to a minor league contract with an invitation to spring training.

==== 2013 ====
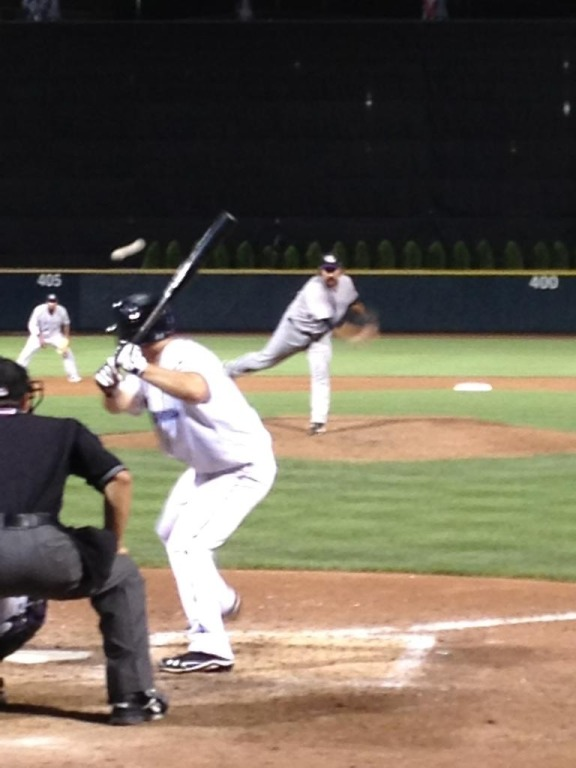
Miller pitching for the Louisville Bats in 2012

On April 21, 2013, Miller was promoted to the Reds, replacing the injured Ryan Hanigan. He made his first start of the season on April 23, 2013, against the Chicago Cubs. The Reds lost this game in extra innings. On May 10, 2013, Miller was outrighted back to Louisville, after Hanigan was activated from the DL. He was called up by the Reds again on July 11, 2013, after placing Hanigan on the disabled list again. On August 7 Miller started behind the plate and hit two RBI doubles in the game before leaving in the fifth inning after a home plate collision; he was later placed on the 15-day disabled list. Miller played in a total of 17 games with the Reds in 2013.

At the conclusion of the 2013 regular season, the Reds outrighted him from the roster. He refused his assignment, becoming a free agent. However, during the Reds annual Redsfest an unsigned Miller appeared signing autographs. Miller would resign to a minor league deal with the Reds the next day.

==== 2014 ====
Miller started the 2014 season in Triple-A Louisville. Miller served as a primary catcher for the Bats due to Tucker Barnhart starting the season in Cincinnati with Devin Mesoraco on the DL. On April 13, 2014, while pitching for the Bats, Miller used a knuckleball to strike out a batter.

Miller was placed on the inactive list in May before being placed on the disabled list in June for a back strain. The Bats announced on August 5, 2014, that they would retire Miller's jersey. Corky Miller is known to many Louisville Bats baseball fans for his mustache, but he'll be remembered by his No. 8 jersey, the first to be retired by the franchise, who at the time of his retirement held the franchise record for number of games played.

== Coaching career ==
Corky Miller was added to the Reds single A affiliate team, Dayton Dragons coaching staff for the 2015 season. Miller joined manager Jose Nieves, pitching coach Tom Browning, and hitting coach Luis Bolivar on the Dragons staff. Miller would also visit other Reds affiliates on select dates in a catching instructor role in 2015. "We are excited to transition Corky Miller onto our Minor League coaching staff in 2015," said Jeff Graupe, Reds Director of Player Development. "Corky will be based out of Dayton and will split his time working with the Dragons and roving around our system developing our catchers.
