= Justin Lehr =

American baseball player (born 1977)

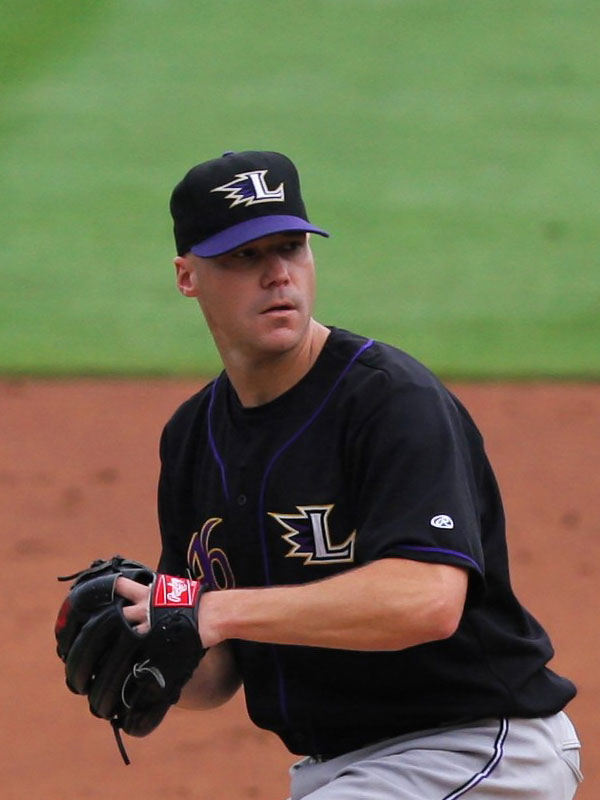
- Lehr with the Louisville Bats
- Pitcher
- Born: August 3, 1977 (age 49); Orange, California, U.S.
- Batted: Right Threw: Right

Professional debut
- MLB: June 20, 2004, for the Oakland Athletics
- KBO: May 31, 2008, for the Doosan Bears

Last appearance
- MLB: October 2, 2009, for the Cincinnati Reds
- KBO: July 29, 2008, for the Doosan Bears

MLB statistics
- Win–loss record: 9–6
- Earned run average: 5.34
- Strikeouts: 84
- Stats at Baseball Reference

Teams
- Oakland Athletics (2004); Milwaukee Brewers (2005–2006); Doosan Bears (2008); Cincinnati Reds (2009); As Coach: San Francisco Giants (2020)

Charles Larry "Justin" Lehr (born August 3, 1977) is an American former professional baseball pitcher. He played for the Oakland Athletics, Milwaukee Brewers, and Cincinnati Reds of Major League Baseball (MLB), as well as the Doosan Bears of the KBO League.

== Early life ==
Lehr was born in Orange, California and graduated from West Covina High School in West Covina, California. He played college baseball at the University of California, Santa Barbara and the University of Southern California. In 1997, he played collegiate summer baseball in the Cape Cod Baseball League for the Yarmouth-Dennis Red Sox where he was named a league all-star.

== Professional career ==
The Oakland Athletics selected Lehr in the 8th round of the 1999 Major League Baseball draft. He was acquired by the Milwaukee Brewers after the 2004 season from the Athletics along with minor league outfielder Nelson Cruz in exchange for infielder Keith Ginter. Lehr has a career Major League ERA of 5.37 in 77 games, mostly in relief. He started 11 games for Cincinnati over the final two months of 2009. He also pitched for the Athletics and Brewers.

On February 4, 2007, in his start for Mexico in the Caribbean baseball series, Lehr gave up 5 runs while only recording one out, giving him an ERA of 162.00. Lehr spent 2007 in the Seattle Mariners organization.

After signing a contract with the Cincinnati Reds, his contract was sold on May 24, 2008, to the Doosan Bears of the KBO. On August 7, he re-signed with the Reds. He became a free agent at the end of the season and signed a minor league contract with the Philadelphia Phillies on December 17, 2008. He was traded back to the Reds on May 23, 2009. On July 31, 2009, Lehr made his first career major league start against the Colorado Rockies. On August 5, 2009, Lehr pitched his first career shutout against the Chicago Cubs.
