= Aaron Harang =

American baseball player (born 1978)

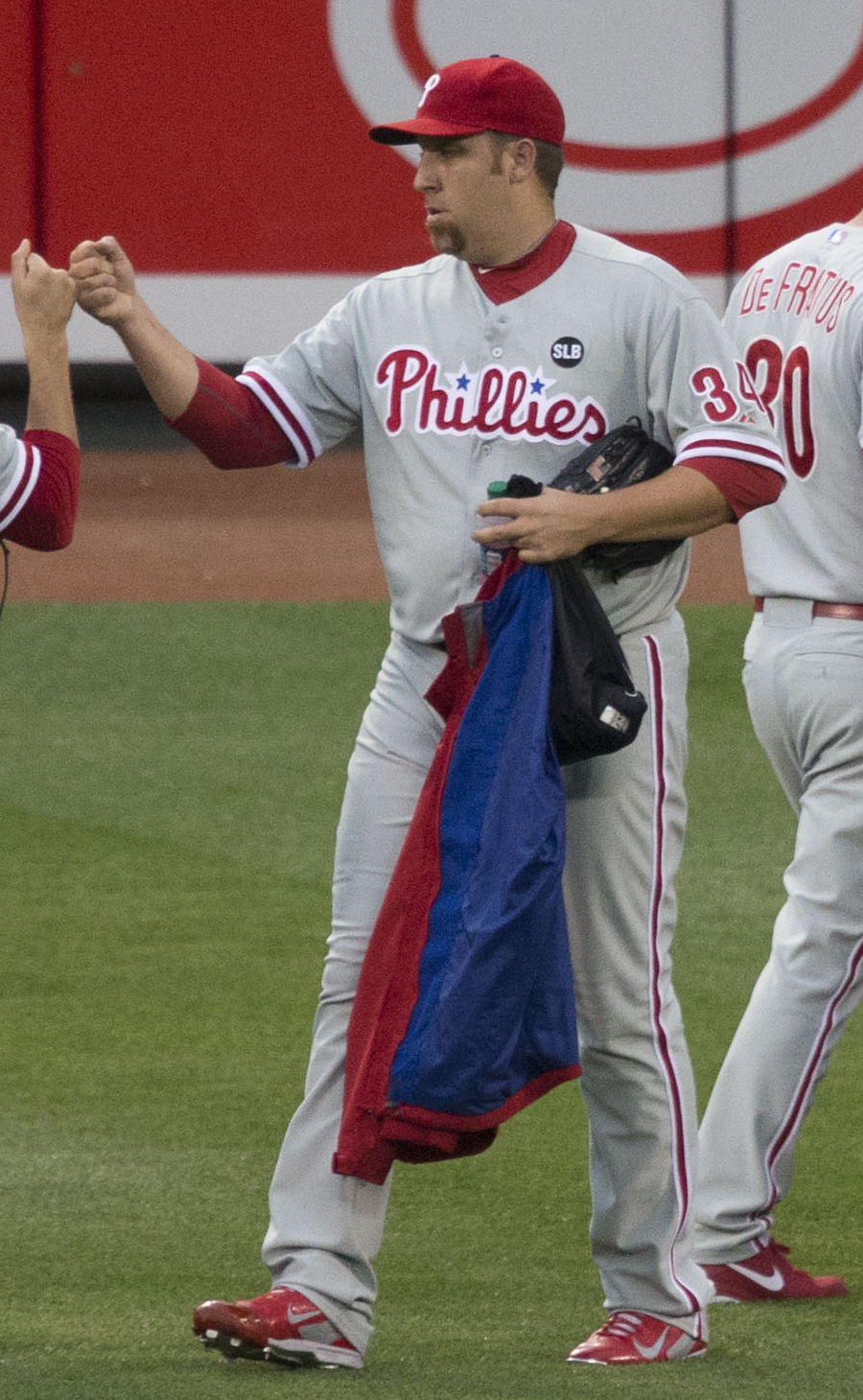
- Harang with the Phillies in 2015
- Pitcher
- Born: May 9, 1978 (age 48); San Diego, California, U.S.
- Batted: Right Threw: Right

MLB debut
- May 25, 2002, for the Oakland Athletics

Last MLB appearance
- October 3, 2015, for the Philadelphia Phillies

MLB statistics
- Win–loss record: 128–143
- Earned run average: 4.26
- Strikeouts: 1,842
- Stats at Baseball Reference

Teams
- Oakland Athletics (2002–2003); Cincinnati Reds (2003–2010); San Diego Padres (2011); Los Angeles Dodgers (2012); Seattle Mariners (2013); New York Mets (2013); Atlanta Braves (2014); Philadelphia Phillies (2015)

Career highlights and awards
- NL wins leader (2006); NL strikeout leader (2006); Cincinnati Reds Hall of Fame

Aaron Michael Harang (born May 9, 1978) is an American former professional baseball starting pitcher. He played in Major League Baseball (MLB) for the Oakland Athletics, Cincinnati Reds, San Diego Padres, Los Angeles Dodgers, Seattle Mariners, New York Mets, Philadelphia Phillies, and Atlanta Braves.

== Amateur career ==
Harang graduated from Patrick Henry High School, then went on to San Diego State University. He was first drafted by the Boston Red Sox in the 22nd round of the 1996 amateur draft, but did not sign with the team. In 1998, he played collegiate summer baseball with the Cotuit Kettleers of the Cape Cod Baseball League.

== Professional career ==
=== Texas Rangers ===
After college, Harang was drafted by the Texas Rangers in the 6th round of the 1999 draft and signed with them. He played for the rookie-level Pulaski Rangers in 1999, finishing with a 9–2 record and 2.30 ERA in 16 appearances (10 starts), including one complete game shutout. He was selected as the Appalachian League Pitcher of the Year and made the postseason all-star team. In 2000, with the Charlotte Rangers, he was 13–5 with a 3.32 ERA in 27 starts and was selected as a Florida State League All-Star.

=== Oakland Athletics ===
In 2000, Harang was traded with minor leaguer Ryan Cullen to the Oakland Athletics for Randy Velarde. He played with the AA Midland RockHounds in 2001, starting 27 games with a 10–8 record and 4.14 ERA.

Harang made his Major League debut for the Athletics on May 25, 2002, against the Tampa Bay Devil Rays. He pitched seven shutout innings in his debut, with 10 strikeouts, to record the win. He started 15 games for the team that season, and also made 1 relief appearance. He finished 5–4 with a 4.83 ERA. In 2003, he started 6 games, with a 1–3 record and 5.34 ERA.

=== Cincinnati Reds ===
During the 2003 season, Harang was traded to the Reds with Joe Valentine and minor leaguer Jeff Bruksch for José Guillén. In 2004, he went 10–9 with a 4.83 ERA for the Reds.

In 2005, Harang led the Reds with 11 wins, 211 2/3 innings pitched, 163 strikeouts, and 19 quality starts. He was the first Reds pitcher to pitch 200 innings in a season since Elmer Dessens in 2001. He received votes for NL Pitcher of the Month in May after going 3–1 with 1.93 ERA over five starts.

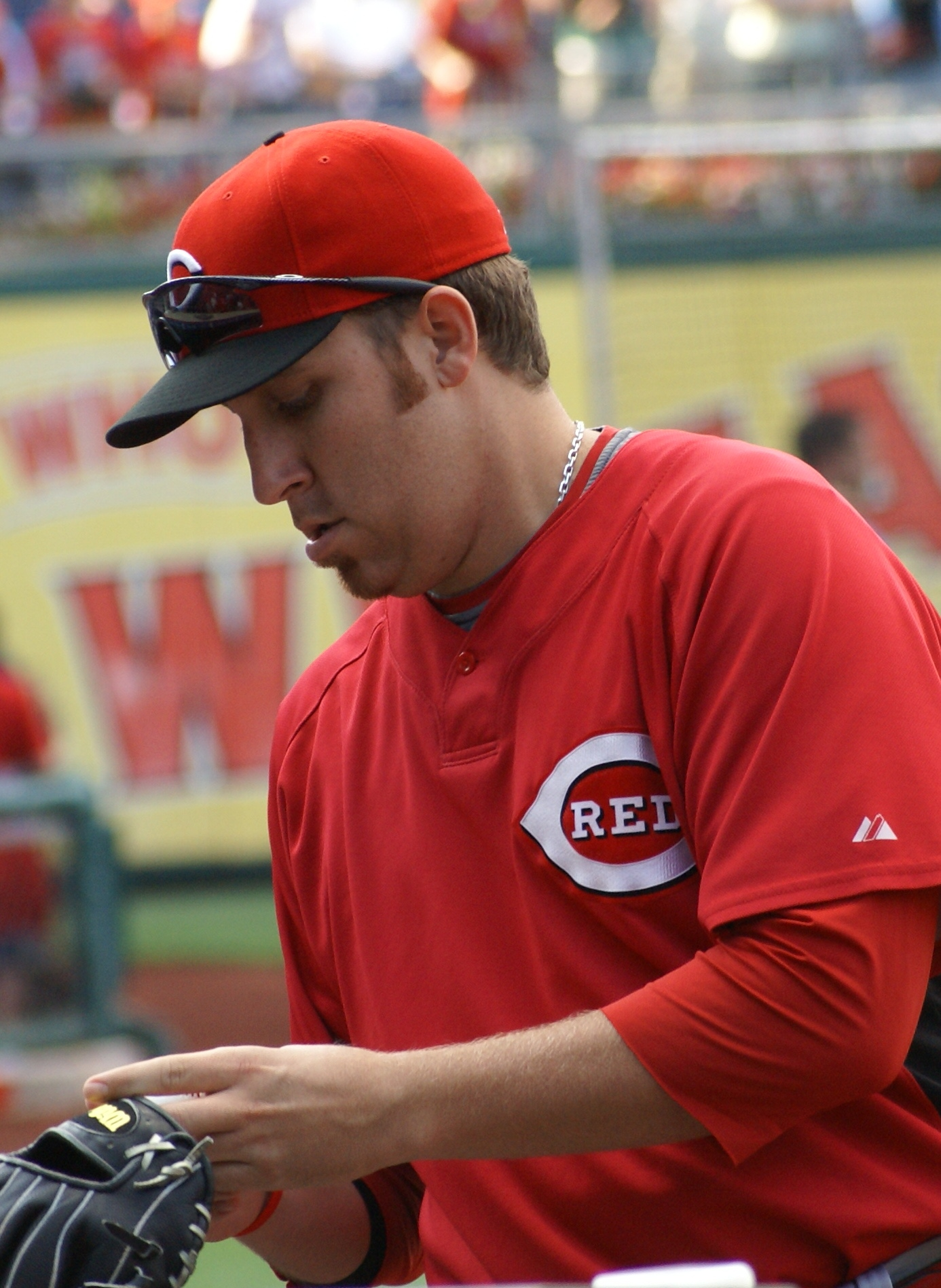
Harang with the Cincinnati Reds in 2009

In 2006, Harang started on Opening Day for the Reds on April 3 against the Chicago Cubs and allowed 9 runs (6 earned) over 5 innings. In his third start of the season, Harang pitched 7 shutout innings against the St. Louis Cardinals, facing off against reigning Cy Young Award winner Chris Carpenter. Harang allowed 4 hits and got 4 strikeouts, also driving in the only run of the game as the Reds won 1–0. Harang pitched a complete game shutout against the Milwaukee Brewers on April 23, allowing five hits as the Reds won 11–0.

Harang led the National League in 2006 with 6 complete games and 216 strikeouts, topping Jake Peavy by only 1 strikeout. He also tied for the league lead with 16 wins and 35 starts. However, he received no votes for the Cy Young Award, won by Brandon Webb. Harang was the 11th National League pitcher since 1956 to lead the National League in both wins and strikeouts, with all other league leaders also winning the Cy Young Award.

On February 6, 2007, Harang signed a four-year, $36.5 million contract extension with the Reds. On July 23, he pitched 10 innings, throwing 121 pitches, becoming the first Reds pitcher to pitch 10 innings since 1989. However, he received a no-decision because the Reds did not win the game until the 12th inning. On September 3, he became the victim of the 3,000th strikeout recorded by Pedro Martínez. Harang ended the season with an NL-leading 4.19 strikeout-to-walk ratio and tied for the lead with 12 wild pitches.

In 2008, he led the majors in giving up 19 home runs at home. His homefield, Great American Ballpark, allow the second-most home runs that season.

Harang hit his first career home run on July 24, 2009, a three-run shot to left field off of Randy Wells of the Cubs. However, Harang lost that game to Wells and the Cubs. He missed the end of the 2009 season after undergoing an emergency appendectomy in August. He ended the season with a 4.21 ERA, 1.41 WHIP and 6–14 record.

In September 2010, Harang was removed from the starting rotation due to ineffectiveness and having been on the DL for two months due to back spasms. In a ceremonial "goodbye," he started the final game of the season against the Brewers, but exited in the third inning with a blister on his finger. Harang was left off the Reds 2010 playoff roster. On November 3, 2010, the Reds bought Harang out of his 2011 contract option, making him a free agent.

=== San Diego Padres ===
On December 6, 2010, Harang signed a one-year, $3.5 million contract with the San Diego Padres that included a mutual option for 2012.

On July 9, 2011, Harang had a no-hitter through six innings against the Los Angeles Dodgers but was pulled after walking 3 and throwing 95 pitches. He made 28 starts in 2011, with a 14–7 record and 3.64 ERA for the Padres. The team did not to pick up his 2012 option, making him a free agent.

=== Los Angeles Dodgers ===
On December 8, 2011, Harang signed a 2-year, $12 million contract with the Los Angeles Dodgers, with a mutual option for 2014.

On April 13, 2012, Harang struck out 9 consecutive batters after giving up a single to set the all time Dodgers record against the San Diego Padres. The record was previously held by Johnny Podres with 8 in 1962. The streak was stopped by Will Venable when he hit an opposite-field home run. Harang finished one strikeout short of tying Tom Seaver's Major League record of 10 consecutive strikeouts in 1970 and tied his career high with 13 total strikeouts in the game.

On June 7, Harang allowed 3 runs in 6 innings in an 8–3 victory over the Philadelphia Phillies to collect his 100th career Major League win. In 31 starts for the Dodgers in 2012, he finished 10–10 with a 3.61 ERA.

=== Seattle Mariners ===
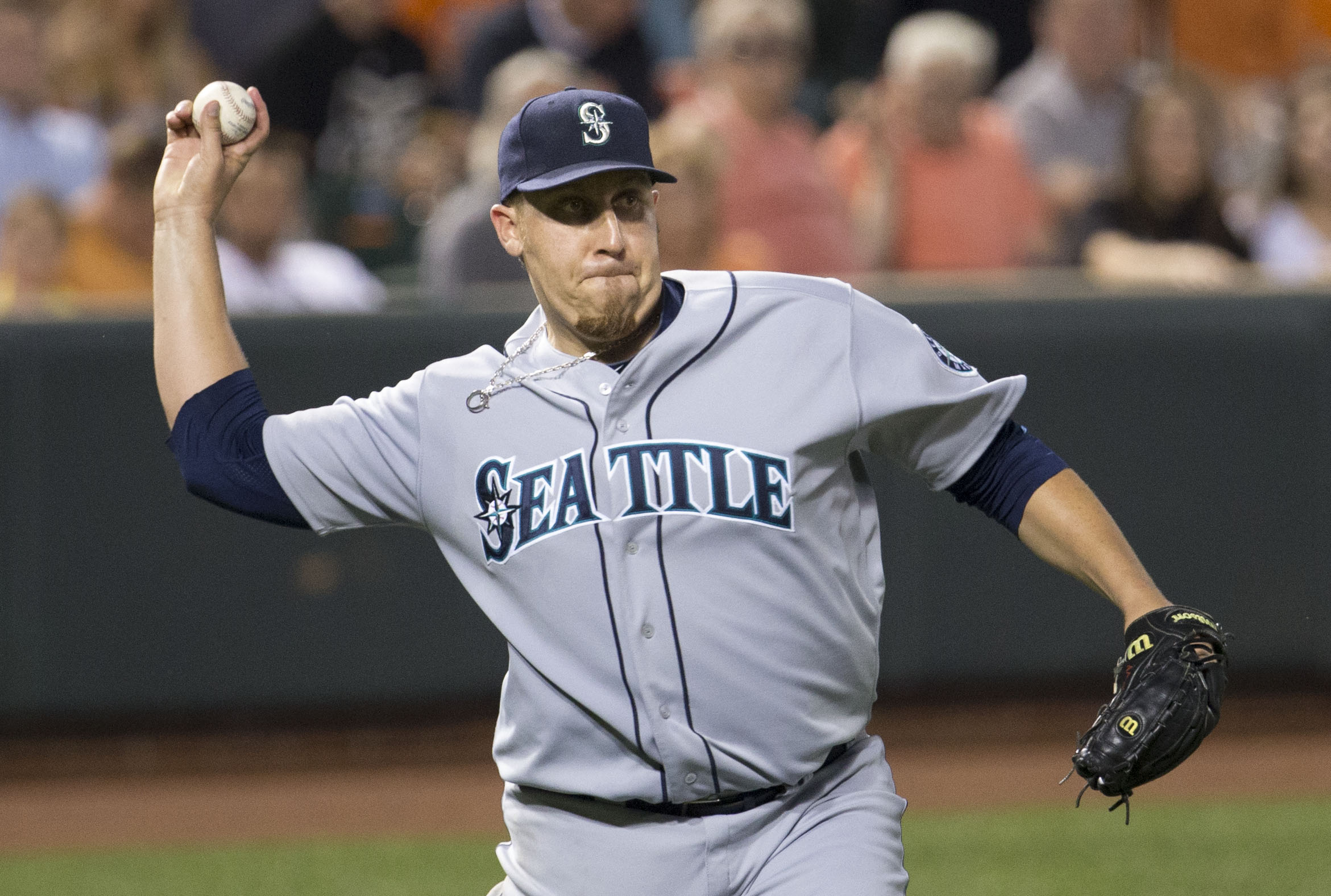
Harang playing for the Mariners in 2013

On April 6, 2013, the Dodgers traded Harang and $4.25 million to cover part of his salary to the Colorado Rockies for catcher Ramón Hernández. The Rockies designated Harang for assignment and on April 11 traded him and cash to the Seattle Mariners for minor leaguer Steven Hensley. Harang pitched shutouts on May 27 and June 11, tying him for second in MLB in shutouts in 2013. In 22 starts for Seattle, he was 5–11 with a 5.76 ERA. He was designated for assignment on August 26 and released on September 1.

=== New York Mets ===
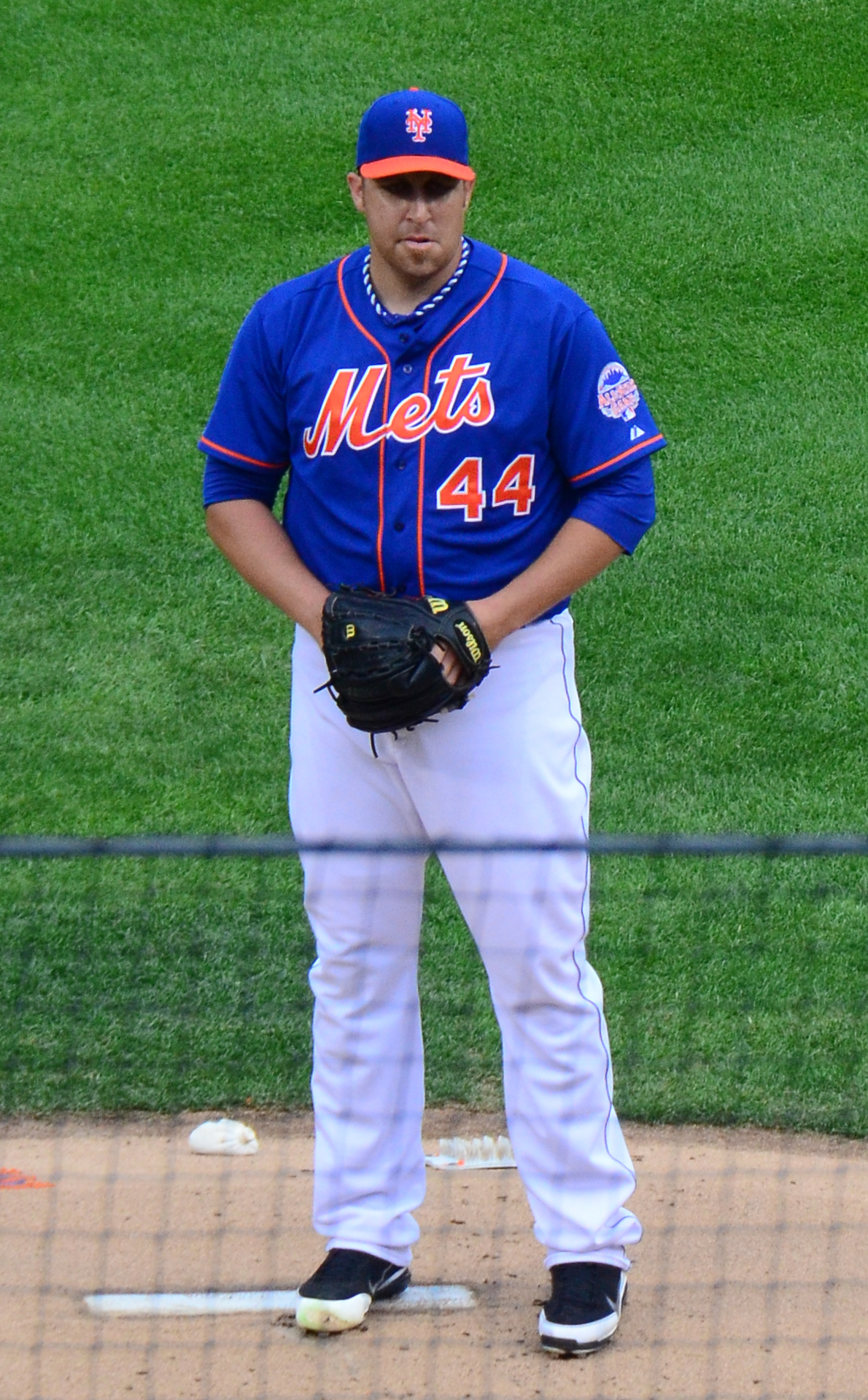
Harang pitching for the New York Mets in 2013

On September 2, 2013, Harang signed a minor league contract with the New York Mets and assigned to the Triple-A Las Vegas 51s. Harang joined the Mets on September 12 and was generally effective for the last few weeks of the season. While he was 0–1 with the Mets, he had a 3.52 ERA and struck out 26 batters in 23 innings pitched. He became a free agent after the season.

=== Atlanta Braves ===
On February 15, 2014, Harang signed a minor league contract with the Cleveland Indians. On March 24, he was released by the Indians and signed a one-year major league contract with the Atlanta Braves. After his first four starts with the Braves, Harang posted a 0.70 ERA, the lowest in the National League. After his next start, he became the first pitcher since Pedro Martínez in 1997 to start a season with five starts of at least 6 innings and one or fewer runs allowed. He only had six such starts in the rest of his 28 starts, with a 4.07 ERA after his hot start. He finished the year with a 12–12 record and a 3.57 ERA over 33 starts. He was ninth in the National League with 204 1/3 innings pitched and was also in the top 10 in hits, walks, and wild pitches.

=== Philadelphia Phillies ===
On January 5, 2015, Harang signed a one-year, $5 million contract with Philadelphia Phillies that included performance bonuses. He again started strong, with a 1.82 ERA in his first nine starts. After missing most of July with plantar fasciitis in his left foot, Harang ended his final MLB season with a 6–15 record and 4.86 ERA in 29 starts for the Phillies. He had the lowest percentage pulled against him, 31.7 percent, among major league pitchers. He also was the 11th best pitcher at inducing infield fly balls.

Harang became a free agent on November 2. In March 2016, he said he was not planning to pitch that year but could change his mind. He did not sign another contract with an MLB team.

== Pitching style ==
Harang threw six pitches. He had a four-seam fastball and two-seam fastball averaging about 90–94 miles per hour. He also threw a slider and changeup in the low 80s and a curveball in the low-to-mid 70s, as well as a small handful of cutters. Harang mostly used his four-seamer and slider against right-handed hitters, while using more variety with left-handed hitters. His curve was typically used early in the count, often against lefties.

== Personal life ==
Harang married Jennifer Wade in 2002 and has three children, Addison, Kailey, and Dustin.

Harang's younger brother Darryl pitched in the minor leagues for the Toronto Blue Jays organization from 2004 to 2008 and in the Reds system in 2010.

During his playing career, Harang gave tickets to military families in a program called "Aaron's Aces." Harang also gave Reds clubhouse staff an 8-person golf cart in 2009.
