= Chris Dickerson (baseball) =

American baseball player (born 1982)

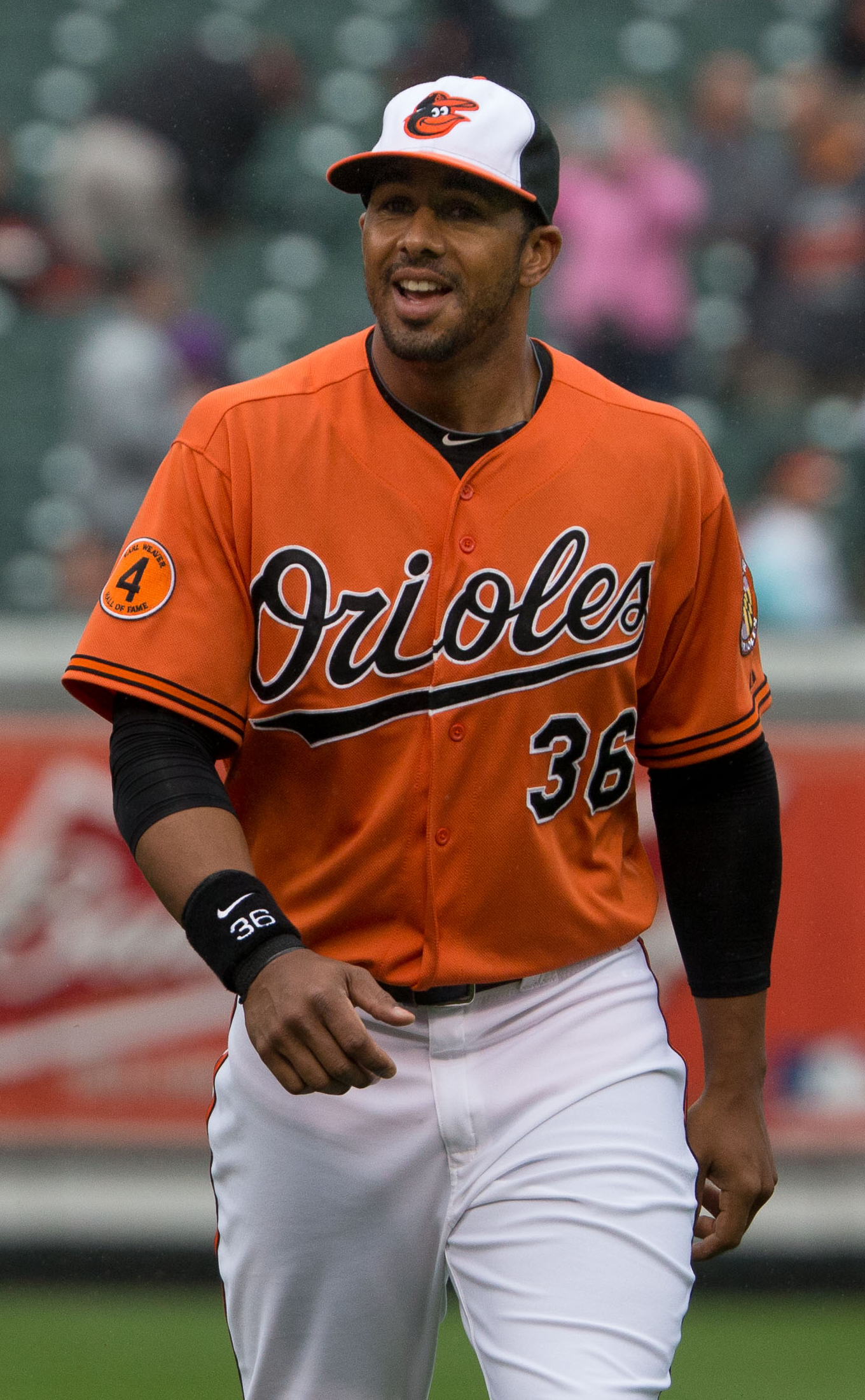
- Dickerson with the Baltimore Orioles
- Outfielder
- Born: April 10, 1982 (age 44); Hollywood, California, U.S.
- Batted: Left Threw: Left

MLB debut
- August 12, 2008, for the Cincinnati Reds

Last MLB appearance
- September 5, 2014, for the Cleveland Indians

MLB statistics
- Batting average: .257
- Home runs: 17
- Runs batted in: 66
- Stats at Baseball Reference

Teams
- Cincinnati Reds (2008–2010); Milwaukee Brewers (2010); New York Yankees (2011–2012); Baltimore Orioles (2013); Cleveland Indians (2014)

Christopher Charles Dickerson (born April 10, 1982) is an American former professional baseball outfielder who played in Major League Baseball (MLB) for the Cincinnati Reds, Milwaukee Brewers, New York Yankees, Baltimore Orioles, and Cleveland Indians between 2008 and 2014.

== Career ==
=== Amateur ===
A native of Hollywood, California, Dickerson attended Notre Dame High School. He was drafted out of high school by the New York Yankees in the 32nd round (968th overall) of the 2000 Major League Baseball draft, but did not sign. He instead attended the University of Nevada, where he played college baseball for the Nevada Wolf Pack baseball team from 2001 through 2003. In 2002, he played collegiate summer baseball with the Brewster Whitecaps of the Cape Cod Baseball League.

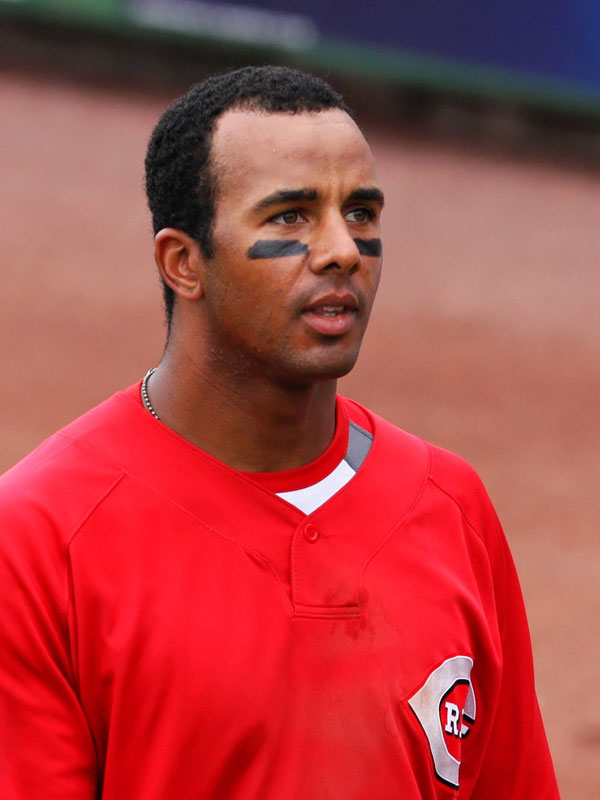
Dickerson, with the Cincinnati Reds in 2009 spring training

=== Cincinnati Reds ===
Dickerson was drafted again, in the 16th round (471st overall) of the 2003 MLB draft, this time by the Cincinnati Reds. He made his Major League debut with the Reds on August 12, 2008. Johnson hit his first career home run on August 15, against the St. Louis Cardinals.

Dickerson earned a starting job in the outfield with Jay Bruce and Willy Taveras entering the 2009 season, due to Ken Griffey Jr. and Adam Dunn's departures. In the first month of the season, Dickerson was only batting .205 with a home run and five RBI. However, by the end of May he boosted his average to .271. He also was featured in highlight reels for his defensive plays while filling in for Tavares at center field.

Dickerson made 20 appearances for Cincinnati in 2010, hitting .205/.222/.273 with three stolen bases.

=== Milwaukee Brewers ===
On August 9, 2010, Dickerson was traded to the Milwaukee Brewers in exchange for outfielder Jim Edmonds. Dickerson batted .208 with five RBI in 25 games with Milwaukee.

=== New York Yankees ===
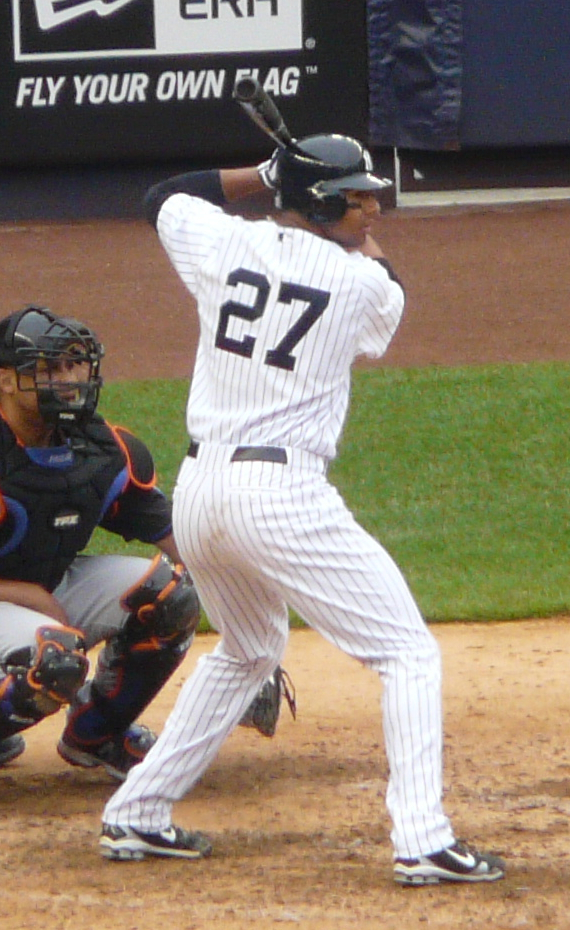
Dickerson batting for the New York Yankees in 2011

On March 25, 2011, Dickerson was traded to the New York Yankees in exchange for pitcher Sergio Mitre. He made his Yankees debut on May 17, going 1-for-3 with one run batted in. He was promoted again to the Major Leagues in September.

Dickerson cleared waivers before the 2012 season and was outrighted to the Triple-A Scranton/Wilkes-Barre Yankees. Dickerson was promoted to the Major Leagues again on September 1, after the rosters expanded. The Yankees designated Dickerson for assignment, and subsequently released him in January 2013.

=== Baltimore Orioles ===
On January 29, 2013, Dickerson signed a minor league contract with the Baltimore Orioles, and was assigned to the Triple-A Norfolk Tides. He was called up to Baltimore on April 10, and made his Orioles debut that night. On May 21, Dickerson hit two home runs off Phil Hughes for his first career multi-homer game. On May 31, Dickerson hit the first walk-off home run of his career against Detroit Tigers pitcher José Valverde. In 56 appearances for Baltimore, he batted .238/.266/.400 with four home runs, 13 RBI, and five stolen bases. Dickerson was designated for assignment by the Orioles on July 19, following the promotion of Henry Urrutia. After clearing waivers, he was sent outright to Triple-A Norfolk on July 29. Dickerson subsequently refused the assignment and became a free agent.

=== Pittsburgh Pirates ===
Dickerson signed a minor league contract with the Pittsburgh Pirates on January 6, 2014. He made 65 appearances for the Triple-A Indianapolis Indians, batting .309/.407/.479 with seven home runs, 30 RBI, and 12 stolen bases.

=== Cleveland Indians ===
Dickerson was traded to the Cleveland Indians on July 7, 2014, and was immediately added to their active roster. In 41 games for the Indians, he batted .224/.309/.327 with two home runs, six RBI, and three stolen bases. On September 9, Dickerson was removed from the 40-man roster and sent outright to the Triple-A Columbus Clippers.

=== Toronto Blue Jays ===
On February 21, 2015, Dickerson signed a minor league contract with the Toronto Blue Jays. In 38 appearances for the Triple-A Buffalo Bisons, he slashed .270/.354/.340 with one home run, 21 RBI, and 10 stolen bases. Dickerson elected free agency following the season on November 6.

=== Baltimore Orioles (second stint) ===
On August 29, 2016, Dickerson signed a minor league contract with the Baltimore Orioles organization. He played in 15 games for the Double-A Bowie Baysox, hitting .332/.385/.610 with three home runs, 10 RBI, and two stolen bases. Dickerson elected free agency following the season on November 7.

Dickerson signed another minor league contract with the Orioles on December 16, 2016. In 81 games for the Triple–A Norfolk Tides, Dickerson hit .244/.365/.396 with seven home runs, 26 RBI, and seven stolen bases. He elected free agency following the season on November 6, 2017.

== Community ==
Along with fellow baseball player Jack Cassel, Dickerson is a founder of Players for the Planet, a foundation that brings professional athletes together to inspire communities to build awareness of the growing environmental crisis. Several athletes including Chase Utley, Jay Bruce, Ryan Braun, Matt Cassel, and Jacoby Ellsbury sit on the foundation's board.
