= Laynce Nix =

American baseball player (born 1980)

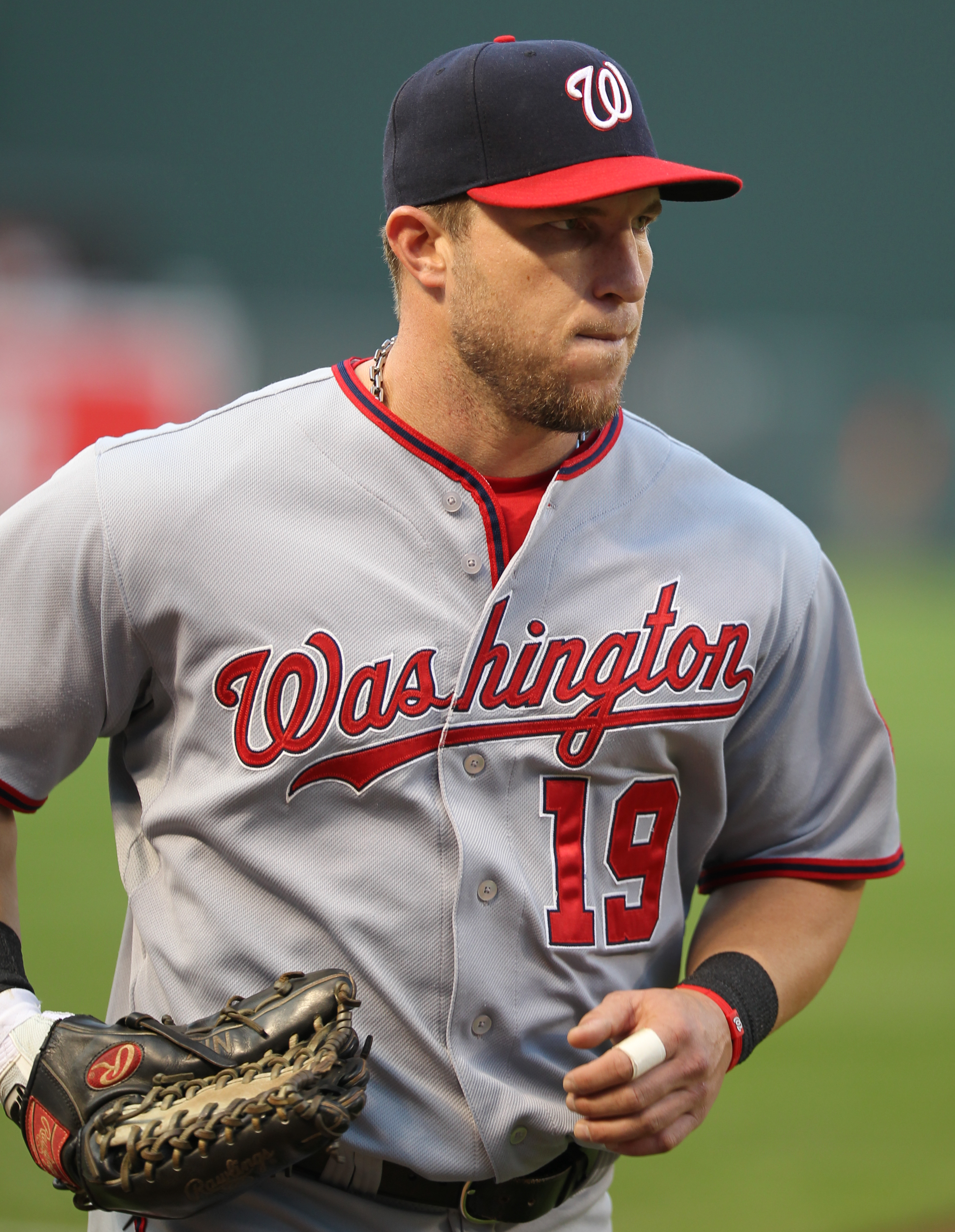
- Nix with the Washington Nationals
- Outfielder
- Born: October 30, 1980 (age 45); Houston, Texas, U.S.
- Batted: Left Threw: Left

MLB debut
- July 10, 2003, for the Texas Rangers

Last MLB appearance
- August 3, 2013, for the Philadelphia Phillies

MLB statistics
- Batting average: .240
- Home runs: 69
- Runs batted in: 249
- Stats at Baseball Reference

Teams
- Texas Rangers (2003–2006); Milwaukee Brewers (2006–2008); Cincinnati Reds (2009–2010); Washington Nationals (2011); Philadelphia Phillies (2012–2013)

Laynce Michael Nix (born October 30, 1980) is an American former professional baseball outfielder. Nix played in Major League Baseball (MLB) for the Texas Rangers, Milwaukee Brewers, Cincinnati Reds, Washington Nationals, and Philadelphia Phillies. Nix played all three outfield positions, as well as first base, but was officially listed as a left fielder by ESPN. His younger brother, Jayson Nix, also played in MLB.

== Early life ==
Nix grew up in the suburbs of Dallas and was home schooled by his mother. A fan of the Texas Rangers, Nix commented that during his childhood: "We'd do some studies in the morning, my brother and I, and then we'd watch the Cubs every day at 1:00. My brother and I would go out in the backyard and imitate what we saw, which was Ryne Sandberg, Andre Dawson, and that crew ... we had a good time." Eventually, he went to public school and attended Midland High, where he played football and was the team's starting quarterback, but baseball was his "first love", and the Rangers drafted him in the fourth round after his senior year in high school.

== Career ==
=== Texas Rangers ===
Nix was selected in the fourth round of the 2000 Major League Baseball draft by the Texas Rangers. He made his debut on July 10, 2003, in a game against the Minnesota Twins. In that game, he recorded his first major league hit, and also scored a run.

Through 2005, Nix hit 28 home runs with 108 RBI. His 2005 season was cut short when he elected to have surgery to repair a torn labrum in his left shoulder.

After a slow start in 2006 and the return of Gary Matthews, Jr. from injury, Nix was optioned to the Rangers' Triple-A affiliate, the Oklahoma RedHawks.

=== Milwaukee Brewers ===
On July 28, 2006, Nix was traded to the Milwaukee Brewers along with Francisco Cordero, Kevin Mench, and Julian Cordero for Carlos Lee and Nelson Cruz.

Hampered by an injury, Nix spent most of 2007 with Milwaukee's Triple-A Nashville Sounds. He was a September call-up, but went hitless in ten games with the Brewers. In December, Nix cleared waivers and was reassigned to Nashville, where he spent the entire 2008 season.

=== Cincinnati Reds ===
In December 2008, Nix signed a minor league contract with the Cincinnati Reds. On November 9, 2010, the Reds released him.

=== Washington Nationals ===
On February 3, 2011, Nix signed a minor league deal with the Washington Nationals. He also received a spring training invite along with his contract. Despite hitting a career high 16 home runs, he became a free agent following the season.

=== Philadelphia Phillies ===
On December 4, 2011, Nix was signed to a two-year contract by the Philadelphia Phillies citing his "mental toughness" and "football mentality". He had an injury-laced 2012 campaign during which he totaled a batting average of .246 with three home runs and 16 RBIs. In the 2012 offseason Nix and Michael Young, close friends from their time together in Texas, reunited when Young signed with the Phillies. Nix was designated for assignment on August 6, 2013. He was released on August 12, 2013. He hit .211/.270/.331 as a Phillie.
