= Matt Maloney (baseball) =

American baseball player (born 1984)

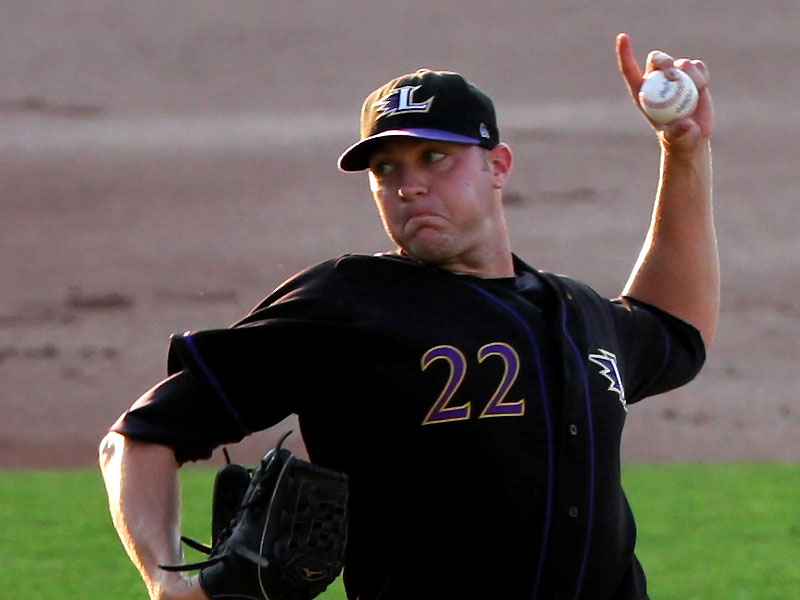
- Maloney with the Louisville Bats
- Pitcher
- Born: January 16, 1984 (age 42); Sandusky, Ohio, U.S.
- Batted: Left Threw: Left

MLB debut
- June 6, 2009, for the Cincinnati Reds

Last MLB appearance
- May 5, 2012, for the Minnesota Twins

MLB statistics
- Win–loss record: 5–9
- Earned run average: 5.74
- Strikeouts: 59
- Stats at Baseball Reference

Teams
- Cincinnati Reds (2009–2011); Minnesota Twins (2012)

Matthew Michael Maloney (born January 16, 1984) is an American former professional baseball pitcher. He played in Major League Baseball (MLB) for the Cincinnati Reds and Minnesota Twins.

Maloney played college baseball at the University of Mississippi, and was drafted by the Philadelphia Phillies in the 3rd round (97th overall) of the 2005 Major League Baseball draft.

== Early life ==
Matthew Michael Maloney was born on January 6, 1984, in Sandusky, Ohio. He attended and graduated from Huron High School in 2002

== Career ==
=== Philadelphia Phillies ===
Maloney started his career in 2005 with the short-season class-A Batavia Muckdogs, where he pitched eight games and went 2–1 with a 3.89 ERA.

He spent all of 2006 with the Lakewood BlueClaws, and was the South Atlantic League's Most Outstanding Pitcher for the season. He was named a mid-season and post-season All-Star and was named a Low Class A All-Star by Baseball America. Maloney started 27 games for the BlueClaws and led the league in most categories, including wins (16 with 9 losses), ERA (2.03), complete games (2), shutouts (1), innings (168.2), and strikeouts (180). He had three 10-strikeout games and was named Phillies' Minor League Pitcher of the Year.

Maloney started the 2007 season in double-A Reading. He started 21 games for the double-A Phillies and was named a mid- and post-season All-Star for the Eastern League after posting a 9–7 record with a 3.94 ERA.

=== Cincinnati Reds ===
Maloney was traded to the Cincinnati Reds on July 30 in exchange for starter Kyle Lohse. He started his Reds tenure with the Double-A Chattanooga Lookouts, where he started four games and went 2–2 with a 2.57 ERA and 39 strikeouts. After the conclusion of the Double-A season, Maloney was promoted to the Triple-A Louisville Bats. He started three games for the Bats and was 2–1 with a 3.18 ERA and 23 strikeouts. His 2007 totals for all three affiliates was 13–10 with 3.64 ERA and 144 strikeouts in 170 2/3 innings (28 starts).

Maloney played the 2008 season at Louisville. He threw two complete games on the season and missed a no-hitter by two outs during the season. Maloney spent nearly a month on the disabled list with a strained right oblique muscle (July 18 to August 7), and made one rehab start for the rookie-level Gulf Coast League Reds. He finished the season 11–5 with a 4.50 ERA in 25 starts. Maloney tied Rico Beltran for second-most strikeouts in a season by a Bats pitcher with 132. Following the season, he was added to the Reds' 40-man roster, in order to be protected from the Rule 5 draft. Maloney subsequently played winter ball in the Venezuelan Winter League for the Navegantes del Magallanes. He pitched in six games and was 1–4 with a 3.42 ERA and 17 strikeouts.

Maloney started the 2009 season at Louisville again and started 10 games for the Bats with a 4–3 record and a 2.00 ERA. On June 6, he was recalled by the Reds to start against the Chicago Cubs. Maloney allowed six hits and two runs while striking out four. He was in line for the win, but the bullpen blew the one-run lead and the Reds eventually won 4–3 in 11 innings. Maloney finished his first stint in the big leagues with an 0–2 record and a 6.11 ERA in three starts.

Maloney was sent back down to Louisville on June 20 and started 12 more games, posting a 5–6 record and a 4.04 ERA. He was promoted again, and started against the Los Angeles Dodgers. Maloney was sent back down, this time to the Double-A Carolina Mudcats between the games of an August 30 double header, and pitched one game of relief (5 2/3 innings), getting the win. He was promoted with roster expansion in September to finish the year with the Reds. Although bothered by a blister on the middle finger of his throwing hand, he pitched much better in his third stint, going 2–1 with a 2.65 ERA.

As a batter over the season, Maloney enjoyed success. He hit .316 for Louisville with a homer and two RBI, and hit the homer off of future Pittsburgh Pirates big-leaguer Daniel McCutchen. He also became the first Reds pitcher to get a hit in his first Major League plate appearance since Scott Randall in 2003.

For Louisville and Carolina, Maloney was 9–9 with a 3.00 ERA and 130 strikeouts. He was 2-4 for the Reds with a 4.87 ERA and 28 strikeouts (his first being Ryan Dempster in his debut). Baseball America rated Maloney's control best in the organization following the season. He was the only left-hander to start for the Reds in 2009 and only the second in a 236-game stretch. Maloney was 10–7 with a 3.34 ERA in 24 games (23 starts) for Louisville in 2010, striking out 104 in 134 2/3 innings. For the Reds, he went 2–2 with a 3.05 ERA in seven games (two starts), and struck out 13 in 20 2/3 innings.

=== Minnesota Twins ===
On October 31, 2011, Maloney was claimed off waivers by the Minnesota Twins. In 8 games (6 starts) for Minnesota, he struggled to an 8.18 ERA with 5 strikeouts across 11 innings of work. On May 9, 2012, Maloney was designated for assignment by the Twins following the promotion of P. J. Walters. He cleared waivers and was sent outright to the Triple-A Rochester Red Wings on May 12. Maloney elected free agency on November 2.

=== Boston Red Sox ===
On February 15, 2013, Maloney signed a minor league contract with the Boston Red Sox organization. In 15 appearances split between the Low-A Lowell Spinners and Double-A Portland Sea Dogs, he posted a cumulative 3.54 ERA with 13 strikeouts and 2 saves across 20 1/3 innings pitched. Maloney elected free agency following the season on November 4, 2013.

=== Somerset Patriots ===
Maloney pitched for the Somerset Patriots of the Atlantic League for most of the 2014 season. He had a record of 10–8 in 22 games started while registering a 3.40 ERA and 90 strikeouts in 137.2 IP. He was second team All Atlantic League starting pitcher.

=== Cincinnati Reds (second stint) ===
On May 21, 2014, Maloney signed a minor league contract to return to the Cincinnati Reds. In 2 starts for the Triple-A Louisville Bats, he struggled to an 0-2 record and 16.20 ERA with 3 strikeouts across 6 2/3 innings pitched. Maloney was released by the Reds organization on June 2.

=== Sugar Land Skeeters ===
Maloney signed with the Sugar Land Skeeters of the Atlantic League of Professional Baseball for the 2015 season. He became a free agent after the 2015 season.
